= List of Brotherhood of Mutants members =

The Brotherhood of Mutants, also known as the Brotherhood of Evil Mutants and the Brotherhood, is a team of comic book mutant supervillains in Marvel Comics' universe who are devoted to mutant superiority over normal humans. Their roster has varied and has included many powerful and dangerous mutants, and they have often been at odds with the X-Men, although on rare occasions they have worked alongside them, usually in order to overcome some greater evil. The original Brotherhood first appeared in The Uncanny X-Men #4 (March 1964), and were created by Stan Lee and Jack Kirby.

== Known members ==
Character	Real Name	Joined In	Notes
Original Incarnation (Uncanny X-Men #4: 1964)
Magneto	Erik Magnus Lensherr (originally Max Eisenhardt)	Uncanny X-Men #4	Team founder and original leader. Father of Polaris. Depowered following M-Day, but repowered in Uncanny X-Men #507. Currently a member of Cyclops' faction of X-Men.
Toad	Mortimer Toynbee	Uncanny X-Men #4	Served in many incarnations of the team as both a member and a leader. Toad was also a janitor for the Jean Grey School for Higher Learning.
Quicksilver	Pietro Django Maximoff	Uncanny X-Men #4	Formerly known as Pietro Frank. Recruited alongside his sister, the Scarlet Witch. Lost his powers following M-Day, but repowered in X-Factor.
Scarlet Witch	Wanda Marya Maximoff	Uncanny X-Men #4	Formerly known as Wanda Frank. Recruited alongside her brother, Quicksilver. Currently a part of the Avengers.
Mastermind	Jason Wyngarde	Uncanny X-Men #4	Recruited as the final member of the original lineup. Former member of the Hellfire Club. Father of the second Mastermind and Lady Mastermind.
Blob	Frederick J. "Fred" Dukes	Amazing Adventures vol. 2 #12 (May 1972)	Has been in several incarnations of the team. Depowered as a result of M-Day but has since been repowered. Later joined X-Cell.
Unus the Untouchable	Angelo Unuscione	Amazing Adventures vol. 2 #12 (May 1972)	Also known as Gunther Bain (due to a legal name change). Depowered following M-Day.
Lorelei	Lani Ubana	The Defenders #15 (Sept. 1974)	Currently a member of the Savage Land Mutates.
Alpha the Ultimate Mutant		The Defenders #15 (Sept. 1974)	Genetic creation of Magneto.
Vanisher	Telford Porter	The Champions #17 Fallen Angels #1 (retconned)	Associate member. Later a forced member of X-Force.
Astra	Unrevealed	X-Men Forever #4	She was never seen as a participating member. Retconned as the first recruit. Resigned prior to the first mission.
Second Incarnation; Founded by Magneto. Later known as the Mutant Force and the Resistants.
Burner	Byron Calley	Captain America Annual #4 (1977)	Later known as Crucible. Current whereabouts are unknown.
Lifter	Ned Lathrop	Captain America Annual #4 (1977)	Later known as Meteorite. Current whereabouts are unknown.
Peeper	Peter Quinn	Captain America Annual #4 (1977)	Later known as Occult and later Peepers. Peeper retained his powers following M-Day.
Shocker	Randall Darby	Captain America Annual #4 (1977)	Later known as Paralyzer. Depowered following M-Day. Current whereabouts are unknown.
Slither	Aaron Salomon	Captain America Annual #4 (1977)	Current whereabouts are unknown.
Third Incarnation; First appeared in Uncanny X-Men #141 (Jan. 1981). Later became known as Freedom Force. Included the veteran member Blob.
Mystique	Raven Darkholme	The Uncanny X-Men #141 (Jan. 1981)	Co-founder and team leader. Served in several incarnations. Adoptive mother of the X-Man Rogue and actual mother of the X-Man Nightcrawler. Lover of Destiny. Later worked alongside the X-Men and the Marauders. Current member.
Destiny	Irene Adler	The Uncanny X-Men #141 (Jan. 1981)	Co-founder and second in command to Mystique. Lover of Mystique and adoptive mother of the X-Man Rogue.
Avalanche	Dominikos Ioannis Petrakis	The Uncanny X-Men #141 (Jan. 1981)	Co-founder and served in several incarnations. Avalanche retained his powers following M-Day.
Pyro	St. John Allerdyce	The Uncanny X-Men #141 (Jan. 1981)	Co-founder and served in several incarnations.
Rogue	Anna Marie	The Avengers Annual #10 (1981)	Adoptive daughter of Mystique and Destiny. Later defected to the X-Men.
Blindspot	Unrevealed	Rogue vol. 3 #7 (March 2005)	Retconned to have joined this incarnation.
Fourth Incarnation; Founded in X-Force #5 (Dec. 1991). Included veteran members Blob, Pyro, and Toad.
Phantazia	Eileen Harsaw	X-Force #5 (Dec. 1991)	Was depowered following M-Day and driven insane then later gained her mutant abilities back during the Krakoa Era.
Sauron	Karl Lykos	X-Force #5 (Dec. 1991)	Former member of the Savage Land Mutates.
Masque	Unrevealed	X-Force #5 (Dec. 1991)	Former member of the Morlocks.
Thornn	Lucia Callasantos	X-Force #6	Former member of the Morlocks.
Fifth Incarnation; Founded in X-Factor #112 (July 1995). Briefly became servants of Onslaught under the names Dark Attendants and Dark Descendants.
Dark Beast	Henry Phillip "Hank" McCoy	X-Factor #112 (July 1995)	Founder and leader of this incarnation. "Beast" from the Age of Apocalypse timeline, thus coming from another reality. Briefly pretended to be Beast and infiltrated the X-Men. Retained powers following M-Day. Later seen trying to help Beast reverse M-Day. Former member of the Dark X-Men.
Fatale	Unrevealed	X-Factor #112 (July 1995)	Used the alias Pamela Greenwood to get close to Bishop, but this is not her name. Depowered following M-Day and former member of X-Cell.
Random	Marshall Evan Stone III	X-Factor #114 (Sept. 1995)	Associate member and revealed to be only a child. Former member of the Acolytes.
Havok	Alexander "Alex" Summers	X-Factor #125 (Aug. 1996)	Defected from X-Factor to infiltrate and spy on this incarnation. Took over leadership following Dark Beast's Havok later returned to the X-Men, then X-Factor.
Ever	Unrevealed	The Uncanny X-Men #339 (Dec. 1996)	Apparently a (retconned) former member of the Gene Nation. Current status and whereabouts are unknown.
X-Man	Nathaniel "Nate" Grey	X-Man #26 (April 1997)	Like Dark Beast, he is also from the Age of Apocalypse timeline.
Aurora	Jeanne-Marie Beaubier	X-Man #26 (April 1997)	Former member of Alpha Flight and sister of the X-Man Northstar. Retained powers following M-Day. Aurora later joined the X-Men and rejoined Alpha Flight.
Sixth Incarnation; Founded in The Uncanny X-Men #363 (Jan. 1999). Included veteran members Blob, Pyro, and Toad. Following the departure of Professor X, they became mercenaries led by Mystique.
Professor X	Charles Francis Xavier	The Uncanny X-Men #363 (Jan. 1999)	Founder and first leader of this incarnation. Also founder and former leader of the X-Men.
Mimic	Calvin Montgomery Rankin	The Uncanny X-Men #363 (Jan. 1999)	Not a mutant, but can mimic mutant abilities. Has the powers of the original X-Men (Angel, Beast, Cyclops, Iceman, and Jean Grey). Former member of the Dark X-Men.
Post	Kevin Tremain	The Uncanny X-Men #363 (Jan. 1999)	Was annihilated by Pyro during an assassination attempt against Senator Robert Kelly.
Seventh Incarnation; Founded in X-Men #106 (Nov. 2000). Included veteran members Avalanche, Blob, Mystique, Post, and Toad
Crimson Commando	Unrevealed	X-Men #106 (Nov. 2000)	Female successor to the original Crimson Commando.
Sabre	Unrevealed	X-Men #106 (Nov. 2000)	Successor to the original Super Sabre.
Sabretooth	Victor Creed	The Uncanny X-Men #388 (Dec. 2000)	Former member of the Marauders and infiltrated the X-Men later on.
Mastermind	Martinique Jason	Cable vol. 2 #87 (Jan. 2001)	Daughter and successor of the original Mastermind (Jason Wyngarde). Retained her powers following M-Day.
Eighth Incarnation; Founded in The Brotherhood #1. This was a large organization with many independent cells. Many were never seen on page or even named.
X	Marvin Hoffman	The Brotherhood #1 (July 2001)	Co-founder and later killed by Mike Asher.
Orwell	Unrevealed	The Brotherhood #1 (July 2001)	Co-founder and later killed by X.
Fagin	Unrevealed	The Brotherhood #1 (July 2001)	Fagin could transform into a purple, spiky humanoid form with slightly enhanced strength. Later killed by Vivisector.
Mike Asher	Michael Asher	The Brotherhood #1 (July 2001)	Later killed by U-Go Girl.
Oswald	Unrevealed	The Brotherhood #1 (July 2001)	Current status and whereabouts are unknown. Presumed deceased.
Marshall	Unrevealed	The Brotherhood #2 (Aug. 2001)	Co-founder and later leaves the group. Turns against the Brotherhood, but is killed by Mike Asher.
Unnamed Colombian mutant	Unrevealed	The Brotherhood #2 (Aug. 2001)	Female mutant with the ability to start fires with her mind. Used her abilities to detonate a building, killing herself.
Marabeth	Unrevealed	The Brotherhood #3 (Sept. 2001)	Current status and whereabouts are unknown. Presumed deceased.
Bryson Bale		The Brotherhood #4 (Oct. 2001)	Later killed by Malcolm Reeves.
Bela	Thomas Morgan	The Brotherhood #4 (Oct. 2001)	It is later implied he was killed by Marshal during an interrogation.
Clive Vickers		The Brotherhood #4 (Oct. 2001)	Killed by Malon Reeves.
Fiona Dunn		The Brotherhood #4 (Oct. 2001)	Later killed by Marshal.
Malon Reeves		The Brotherhood #5 (Nov. 2001)	Later killed by Spike.
Unnamed mutant fan of Phish	Unrevealed	The Brotherhood #7 (Jan. 2002)	Current status and whereabouts is unknown.
Jane Smythe/Dick Smythe		The Brotherhood #8 (Feb. 2002)	Was known as Jane Smythe in her female form and Dick Smythe in his male form. Current status and whereabouts is unknown. Presumed deceased.
Ms. Fingers	Unrevealed	The Brotherhood #9 (March 2002)	Ms. Fingers was a squidlike mutant with the ability to teleport or become transparent. She caught Marshal by surprise in his final battle with Hoffman, as one of the last Brotherhood members loyal to Hoffman, but she was hit with a brick by Orwell.
Trois	Unrevealed	The Brotherhood #9 (March 2002)	Current status and whereabouts is unknown.
Chela	Unrevealed	The Brotherhood #9 (March 2002)	Later killed by X-Force member Phat with the excess skin from his hand.
Unnamed mutant with bony protrusions	Unrevealed	The Brotherhood #9 (March 2002)	Killed at the X-Force parade.
Unnamed scaley mutant	Unrevealed	The Brotherhood #9 (March 2002)	Killed by X-Force at the parade.
Unnamed mutant with fangs	Unrevealed	The Brotherhood #9 (March 2002)	Killed by X-Force at the parade.
Ninth Incarnation; Founded in The Uncanny X-Men #401 (Feb. 2002). Included veteran members Mystique, Avalanche, Blob, and Mastermind (Martinique Jason).
Fever Pitch	Unrevealed	The Uncanny X-Men #401 (Jan. 2002)	Fever Pitch retained his powers following M-Day.
Tenth Incarnation; Founded in New X-Men #146 (Oct. 2003). Included veteran member Toad.
"Magneto"/Xorn	Kuan-Yin Xorn	New X-Men #146 (Nov. 2003)	Co-founder and leader. Impersonated Magneto and killed Jean Grey. Former X-Men until he turned on them to recreate the Brotherhood.
Basilisk	Mike Columbus	New X-Men #146 (Nov. 2003)	Former student of the Xavier Institute and later killed by Xorn.
Beak	Barnell Bohusk	New X-Men #146 (Nov. 2003)	Former member of the Exiles and former student of the Xavier Institute.
Ernst	Unrevealed	New X-Men #146 (Nov. 2003)	Currently a student at the Jean Grey School.
Esme Cuckoo	Esme Cuckoo	New X-Men #146 (Nov. 2003)	Former student of the Xavier Institute.
No-Girl	Martha Johansson	New X-Men #146 (Nov. 2003)	Former student of the Xavier Institute.
Angel	Angel Salvadore	New X-Men #146 (Nov. 2003)	Former student of the Xavier Institute.
Eleventh Incarnation; Founded in X-Men #161 (Nov. 2004). Included veteran members Avalanche and Sabretooth.
Exodus	Bennet du Paris	X-Men #161 (Nov. 2004)	Later reformed the Acolytes only and lead them until he disbanded them in X-Men: Legacy #225.
Black Tom Cassidy	Thomas Samuel Eamon Cassidy	X-Men #161 (Nov. 2004)	Cousin of the former X-Man Banshee. Retained powers following M-Day, but lost his tree-like form. Currently partnered up with Juggernaut.
Juggernaut	Cain Marko	X-Men #161 (Nov. 2004)	Mole working for the X-Men. Former member of the X-Men and Excalibur.
Mammomax	Maximus Jensen	X-Men #161 (Nov. 2004)	Retained powers following M-Day and took refuge at the Xavier Institute.
Nocturne	Talia Josephine "T.J." Wagner	X-Men #161 (Nov. 2004)	Mole working for the X-Men. Former member of the Exiles and Excalibur.
False Incarnation; According to "Cyclops" a new Brotherhood had formed. However it was a ruse created by Donald Pierce who was impersonating Cyclops.
Sunspot	Roberto "Bobby" da Costa	Young X-Men #2	Co-founder and leader. Former member of the Hellfire Club as their Lord Imperial and former student of the Xavier Institute.
Cannonball	Samuel Zachary "Sam" Guthrie	Young X-Men #2	Former member of X-Force and former student at both the Massachusetts Academy and the Xavier Institute.
Moonstar	Danielle "Dani" Moonstar	Young X-Men #2	Former member of X-Force and former student and teacher at the Xavier Institute.
Magma	Amara Juliana Olivians Aquilla	Young X-Men #2	Former member of X-Force and former student at the Xavier Institute.
Wolfsbane	Rahne Sinclair		Associate member only. Member of X-Factor and former student and teacher at the Xavier Institute.
Karma	Xi'an Coy Manh		Associate member only. Former student and teacher at the Xavier Institute.
Sisterhood of Mutants; First mentioned in Uncanny X-Men #499. This lineup consists of only females, although they were also helped by Empath in their attack against the X-Men.
Red Queen	Madelyne Jennifer "Maddie" Pryor	The Uncanny X-Men #499	Founder and former leader of the team.
Mastermind	Martinique Jason	The Uncanny X-Men #499	Was approached by the Red Queen to join. Former member of the Brotherhood of Mutants.
Chimera	Unrevealed	The Uncanny X-Men #503	Approached by the Red Queen to join. Escaped with the team and returned as the leader of the new team of Marauders.
Spiral	Rita Wayword	The Uncanny X-Men #504	Approached by the Red Queen to join. Former member of Freedom Force and a "Mojoworlder". Claimed leadership following the death of the Red Queen.
Lady Deathstrike	Yuriko Oyama	The Uncanny X-Men #504	Has been reconstructed to follow the orders of Spiral and joined when she did. Former member of the Reavers and the Thunderbolts. She escaped with the team and is currently working for the Descendants.
Lady Mastermind	Regan Wyngarde	The Uncanny X-Men #508	Approached by the Red Queen to join. Daughter of the original Mastermind and sister of Mastermind (Martinique Jason). Former member of both the X-Men and the Marauders.
Psylocke	Elizabeth "Betsy" Braddock	The Uncanny X-Men #509	Psylocke was brainwashed into joining by the Red Queen. Former member of the Exiles; has now rejoined the X-Men. Current member of X-Force.
Empath	Manuel Alfonso Rodrigo de la Rocha	The Uncanny X-Men #510	Associate member only. Previously working under the Red Queen's orders in the Hellfire Cult.
Thirteenth Incarnation; First appearance in miniseries Magneto: Not a Hero #1. This lineup consisted of Astra and the clones of the members of the original Brotherhood of Magneto that she created.
"Magneto"/Joseph	Erik Magnus Lensherr (clone)	Magneto: Not a Hero #1	Joseph was previously a member of the X-Men who sacrificed himself to save the Earth from Magneto. He was later resurrected by Astra as a villain.
Blob	Frederick J. "Fred" Dukes (Clone)	Magneto: Not a Hero #1	Clone of the original Blob created by Astra. Killed by Magneto in Magneto: Not a Hero #4.
Mastermind	Jason Wyngarde (Clone)	Magneto: Not a Hero #1	Clone of the original Mastermind created by Astra. Killed by Magneto in Magneto: Not a Hero #4.
Toad	Mortimer Toynbee (Clone)	Magneto: Not a Hero #1	Clone of the original Toad created by Astra. Killed by Magneto in Magneto: Not a Hero #3.
Scarlet Witch	Wanda Marya Maximoff (Clone)	Magneto: Not a Hero #1	Clone of the original Scarlet Witch created by Astra. Killed by Magneto in Magneto: Not a Hero #3.
Quicksilver	Pietro Django Maximoff (Clone)	Magneto: Not a Hero #1	Clone of the original Quicksilver created by Astra. Killed by Magneto in Magneto: Not a Hero #3.
Fourteenth Incarnation; First appearance in series Uncanny X-Force #26. Included the veteran members Mystique and Sabretooth.
Shadow King	Amahl Farouk	Uncanny X-Force #26	Farouk was a telepath who confronted Xavier years ago and lost his body, becoming a psychic entity. Psylocke caged him for years in her mind.
Skinless Man	Unknown	Uncanny X-Force #26	Weapon III of the Weapon Plus project. The Skinless Man had his skin removed by Fantomex and thus despises him. He joined the Brotherhood to complete his revenge against his nemesis. He was killed by Deadpool in Uncanny X-Force #34.
Daken	Akihiro	Uncanny X-Force #27	Daken is the mutant son of Wolverine and his deceased wife Itsu. He possesses superhuman abilities similar to his father (e.g., healing factor, retractable claws), and was member of the Dark Avengers under the name Wolverine.
Blob	Frederick J. "Fred" Dukes (Age of Apocalypse version)	Uncanny X-Force #27	In the AoA Universe, Blob was a guinea pig of Dark Beast and later was a member of the Sinister Six. Years later, as a member of the Black Legion, he murdered Linda, AoA Nightcrawler's wife. He escaped to the 616 reality. Killed by AoA Nightcrawler in Uncanny X-Force #33.
Omega Red	Clone of Arkady Rossovich	Uncanny X-Force #27	One of the three "clones" of Omega Red created by White Sky, a secret organization that creates custom hit-men. The clones are programmed to hate the X-Force as they believe that Wolverine, Deadpool, and AoA Nightcrawler killed their parents. He possesses tentacles housed within his arms like the original Omega Red. Killed (presumably by Wolverine) in Uncanny X-Force #33.
Omega Black	Clone of Arkady Rossovich	Uncanny X-Force #27	One of the three "clones" of Omega Red created by White Sky, a secret organization that creates custom hit-men. The clones are programmed to hate the X-Force, as they believe that Wolverine, Deadpool, and AoA Nightcrawler killed their parents. She possesses five tentacles in her chest that fill her foes with diseases.
Omega White	Clone of Arkady Rossovich	Uncanny X-Force #27	One of the three "clones" of Omega Red created by White Sky, a secret organization that creates custom hit-men. The clones are programmed to hate the X-Force, as they believe that Wolverine, Deadpool, and AoA Nightcrawler killed their parents. He possesses the ability of creating psychic tentacles that drain the life force from others. Omega White's artificial mind is erased by Psylocke and his body is subsequently used to imprison the Shadow King in Uncanny X-Force #34.
Fifteenth Incarnation; First appearance in series All New X-Men #9. Included the veteran members Mystique, Sabretooth and Blob, as well as Lady Mastermind. Mystique and the Brotherhood later dominated Madripoor and began to build her "Mutant Utopia" in the island nation.
Silver Samurai	Shingen "Shin" Harada	Wolverine and the X-Men #20	The son of Kenuichio Harada, the original Silver Samurai. Joined Mystique initially to track down newly awakened mutants to join her cause.
Future Brotherhood of Mutants; First appearance in one-shot X-Men: Battle of the Atom #1. Came to the present pretending to be the Future X-Men and trying to send the original X-Men back to their time, until being revealed as impostors by the real Future X-Men.
Xorn	Jean Grey	X-Men: Battle of the Atom #1	The future version of Jean Grey in case she never returned to her time. Had to wear Xorn's mask to contain her intense psychic powers. Died after her powers overcame her physical strength. Revealed to be alive in All-New X-Men #27.
Raze		X-Men: Battle of the Atom #1	The son of Wolverine and Mystique from a possible future, from whom he inherited his claws and shapeshifting powers. Pretended to be Kitty Pryde (from the Days of Future Past future) before revealing his real identity.
Professor X	Charles Francis Xavier II	X-Men: Battle of the Atom #1	The alleged grandson of Professor X from a possible future. Gets paralyzed from the waist down after being stabbed by the future version of Colossus with Magik's Soulsword. Revealed to be the future son of Mystique and Charles Xavier.
Beast	Henry Phillip "Hank" McCoy	X-Men: Battle of the Atom #1	A possible future version of Beast, with a scarier appearance including a horn.
Bruiser	Molly Hayes	X-Men: Battle of the Atom #1	The possible future version of Molly Hayes, from the Runaways.
Deadpool	Wade Wilson	X-Men: Battle of the Atom #1	The possible future version of Deadpool. Killed in battle against Magik and the future version of Colossus. Revealed to be alive in All-New X-Men #27.
Ice Thing	Robert Louis "Bobby" Drake	X-Men: Battle of the Atom #1	A sentient ice being created by the future version of Iceman who operates as the wizard Icemaster.
Sisterhood - Second Incarnation; First appearance in series X-Men vol. 4 #7. Includes veteran members Lady Deathstrike (whose consciousness was downloaded into the body and mind of Ana Cortes, a mobbed-up rich girl from Colombia, and shares the body with Ana's own consciousness; when Ana killed herself; Deathstrike's consciousness was transferred to her associate Reiko's body, sharing it with Arkea) and Madelyne Pryor (revived by Arkea and the Enchantress). The second incarnation of the Sisterhood banded together to retrieve living samples of Arkea, a technological virus related to John Sublime.
Typhoid Mary	Mary Walker	X-Men vol. 4 #7	Invited by Lady Deathstrike to join her Sisterhood in exchange for a way to merge her multiple personalities into one.
Enchantress	Amora	X-Men vol. 4 #8	Invited by Lady Deathstrike to join her Sisterhood in exchange for a way to have her powers restored.
Arkea		X-Men vol. 4 #9	A sentient alien technological bacterium, reanimated in the body of Lady Deathstrike's associate Reiko. Killed in battle against Storm's X-Men team.
Black Queen	Selene Gallio	X-Men vol. 4 #11	Former member of the Inner Circle of the Hellfire Club. Revived by the Enchantress and invited to join Arkea's Sisterhood.
Sixteenth Incarnation; First appearance in series X-Men: Gold vol. 2 #1.
Mesmero	Vincent	X-Men: Gold vol. 2 #2	
Magma	Amara Juliana Olivians Aquilla	X-Men: Gold vol. 2 #1	
Masque	Unknown	X-Men: Gold vol. 2 #1	A member of the Morlocks.
Pyro	Simon Lasker	X-Men: Gold vol. 2 #1	A male mutant whose appearance and powers resemble the original Pyro.
Avalanche	Unrevealed	X-Men: Gold vol. 2 #1	His appearance and powers resemble those of Dominikos Petrakis aka the original Avalanche.
Kologoth	Kologoth Antares	X-Men: Gold vol. 2 #1	A mutant with a reptilian-like appearance.

== Other versions ==
=== Age of Apocalypse Brotherhood lineup ===
The Brotherhood of Mutants is referred to as the "Brotherhood of Chaos." Among its members are:

- Arclight (who is not the same as the mainstream Marvel character Arclight/Philippa Sontag)
- Box (Madison Jeffries)
- Copycat (Vanessa Carlyle)
- Spyne
- Yeti

=== House of M Brotherhood ===
Since the rise of Mutants in this alternate version of Earth, most human officers were phased out (similar to what happened to S.H.I.E.L.D.), with the exception of Sam Wilson. A mutant strikeforce known as the Brotherhood is also implemented to take down organized crime. Among its members are:

- John Proudstar (leader)
- Avalanche (Dominikos Petrakis)
- Blob (Frederick J. Dukes)
- Boom Boom (Tabitha Smith)
- Feral (Lucia Callasantos)
- Frank Castle - only human member; defected to the Avengers.
- Taskmaster - posed as a mutant; was made quadriplegic by Luke Cage after he killed Tigra.

=== Ultimate Brotherhood lineup ===
Among the members of the Ultimate Marvel Universe's version of the Brotherhood of Mutants are:

- Blob (Franklin Dukes)
- Detonator
- Forge
- Hard Drive
- Juggernaut (Cain)
- Longshot (Arthur Centino)
- Magneto (Erik Lehnsherr)
- Mastermind
- Multiple Man (Jamie Madrox)
- Mystique
- Quicksilver (Pietro Maximoff Lensherr) - Defected to the Ultimates. Returned to the Brotherhood.
- Sabretooth (Creed)
- Unus the Untouchable
- Vanisher

==== Former members ====
- Cyclops (Scott Summers) - Defected from the X-Men. Returned to the X-Men. Currently deceased.
- Rogue (Marian) - Defected to the X-Men
- Scarlet Witch (Wanda Maximoff Lensherr) - Defected to the Ultimates.
- Toad - Defected to the X-Men. Currently deceased.
- Wolverine (James "Logan" Howlett) - Placed as a mole in the X-Men, but defected to the X-Men. Currently deceased.

==== Animal Evolutionaries ====
- Prosimian - A mutant ape.
- Orb-Weaver - A mutant spider.
- Sumatran - A mutant rhinoceros.
- Saluki - A mutant dog.
- Kathleen - A mutant caterpillar.
