= Pyro (Marvel Comics) =

Marvel Comics character

St. John Allerdyce Pyro

Publication information
- Publisher: Marvel Comics
- First appearance: The Uncanny X-Men #141 (January 1981)
- Created by: Chris Claremont (writer); John Byrne (artist)

In-story information
- Alter ego: St. John Allerdyce
- Species: Human mutant
- Team affiliations: Brotherhood of Mutants; Freedom Force; Lethal Legion; Marauders; X-Factor
- Abilities: Pyrokinesis

Pyro is the name of several characters appearing in American comic books published by Marvel Comics. The first incarnation of Pyro, St. John Allerdyce, first appeared in The Uncanny X-Men #141 (January 1981). The second incarnation, Simon Lasker, debuted as Pyro in X-Men Gold vol. 2 #1 (April 2017). Since their original introductions in comics, characters using the Pyro codename have appeared in a range of Marvel-licensed media, including films, television series, video games, and merchandise.

An Americanized version of Pyro named John Allerdyce appeared in the X-Men film franchise produced by 20th Century Fox. He was portrayed by Alexander Burton in X-Men (2000), and was subsequently replaced by Aaron Stanford for its sequels X2 (2003) and X-Men: The Last Stand (2006), and the Marvel Cinematic Universe (MCU) film Deadpool & Wolverine (2024).

== Publication history ==
=== St. John Allerdyce ===
St. John Allerdyce debuted in The Uncanny X-Men #141 (January 1981), created by writer Chris Claremont and artist/co-writer John Byrne. He subsequently appeared in several Marvel series, including Daredevil (1964), Avengers Annual (1967), Marvel Graphic Novel (1982), X-Force (2008), and Marauders (2019).

=== Simon Lasker ===
Simon Lasker made his first appearance in X-Men Gold vol. 2 #1 (April 2017), created by writer Marc Guggenheim and artist Ardian Syaf. He subsequently appeared in Marvel's Voices (2020) and X-Force (2020).

== Fictional character biography ==
=== St. John Allerdyce ===
The first Pyro is St. John Allerdyce. Created by writer Chris Claremont and artist/co-writer John Byrne, the character first appeared in The Uncanny X-Men #141 (January 1981).

Born and raised in Sydney, Australia, St. John Allerdyce is a mutant who possesses the elemental power to control fire and flame, though not generate it. As such, he wields a flamethrower to provide heat for him to control. After years of working in Southeast Asia as a journalist and novelist, Pyro met the mutant Mystique, who later recruited him to the Brotherhood of Mutants as a professional criminal and subversive. With the Brotherhood of Mutants, he attempted to assassinate Senator Robert Kelly, and first battled the X-Men. With the Brotherhood, he later battled the Avengers, and then the X-Men again. Though he never served under the team's original leader, Magneto, Pyro did work with the Brotherhood under the command of several of Magneto's subordinates who alternately supervised the group.

Mystique's Brotherhood is renamed Freedom Force after its members offer their services to the United States government in exchange for protection and an official pardon for its crimes. As part of their first mission, the team captures Magneto. With Freedom Force, Pyro captures the Avengers on behalf of the federal government.

During Freedom Force's final mission, the team confronts a group of Iraqi operatives known as Desert Sword in Kuwait. Pyro and Blob are abandoned in Kuwait and captured. Blob and Pyro are forced to serve as bodyguards to the Kuwaiti military. Later, Toad buys their release. Blob and Pyro join Toad's new Brotherhood of Mutants.

Some years later, Pyro contracts the Legacy Virus, a fatal disease mainly affecting mutants. He goes to great lengths to find a cure, but is unsuccessful and dies from the virus. Pyro dies shortly after helping rescue Robert Kelly from his former allies in the Brotherhood of Mutants, with his actions being instrumental in changing Kelly's opinion on mutants as a whole.

During the "Necrosha" storyline, Pyro is resurrected via the Transmode Virus to serve as part of Selene's army of deceased mutants. He later joins a new Brotherhood of Mutants led by Magneto's clone Joseph, who claims to be Magneto.

=== Simon Lasker ===
Simon Lasker Pyro

Publication information
- Publisher: Marvel Comics
- First appearance: X-Men Gold (Vol. 2) #1 (April 2017)
- Created by: Marc Guggenheim; Ardian Syaf

In-story information
- Alter ego: Simon Lasker
- Species: Human mutant
- Team affiliations: Brotherhood of Mutants; X-Men
- Abilities: Pyrokinesis

The second Pyro is Simon Lasker. Created by writer Marc Guggenheim and artist Ardian Syaf, the character first appeared in X-Men Gold vol. 2 #1 (April 2017).

Simon Lasker is an American teenage mutant who manifests pyrokinesis after accidentally burning down his high school, killing everyone inside. Mesmero, appearing as Professor X, subsequently brainwashes him into becoming the new Pyro and joining his Brotherhood of Mutants, which is secretly funded by anti-mutant activist Lydia Nance. After discovering Nance's anti-mutant agenda, Lasker leaves the Brotherhood and joins the X-Men.

In X-Men Gold (vol. 2) #32, Lasker is revealed to be gay and begins a romantic relationship with Bobby Drake / Iceman.

Following the establishment of the mutant nation of Krakoa, Lasker becomes one of its citizens but is killed during an invasion by Russian armed forces.

== Powers and abilities ==
St. John Allerdyce possesses the mutant ability to mentally manipulate existing sources of fire. He can extinguish flames, increase their size and temperature, direct their movement, and shape them into semi-solid constructs, including hands, birds, and demons. His mutation also grants him immunity to the heat generated by the flames he controls. Because he cannot generate fire naturally, Allerdyce wears an insulated costume to protect himself from uncontrolled flames and carries a flamethrower to provide a source of fire for his powers.

Simon Lasker possesses the mutant ability of pyrokinesis, allowing him to generate and manipulate flames, including controlling their shape, size, and temperature.

== Other versions ==
=== Age of Apocalypse ===
An alternate version of St. John Allerdyce / Pyro appears in Age of Apocalypse. He is among the mutants imprisoned by Mister Sinister after refusing to join the Elite Mutant Force and is subsequently killed while attempting to escape.

=== House of M ===
An alternate version of St. John Allerdyce / Pyro appears in House of M. He is a member of Australia's mutant supremacist government.

=== Marvel Adventures ===
An alternate version of St. John Allerdyce / Pyro appears in Marvel Adventures Spider-Man.

=== Marvel Zombies ===
A zombified universe version of St. John Allerdyce / Pyro appears in Marvel Zombies.

=== Ronin ===
Pyro works as a murderous mutant ninja for the Japanese-based Hellfire Club. He battles the X-Men alongside fellow ninja Iceman and Avalanche.

=== Ultimate Marvel ===
An alternate version of Pyro from Earth-1610 appears in Ultimate X-Men. He is a member of the Morlocks and a supporter of Charles Xavier's cause. He subsequently joins the X-Men before defecting to Magneto's Brotherhood of Mutants. Additionally, he is able to generate fire rather than manipulating it.

== In other media ==
=== Television ===
- Pyro appears in X-Men: Pryde of the X-Men, voiced by Pat Fraley. This version is a member of the Brotherhood of Mutant Terrorists.
- St. John Allerdyce / Pyro appears in X-Men: The Animated Series, voiced by Graham Halley. This version is a British member of Mystique's Brotherhood of Mutants.
- St. John Allerdyce / Pyro appears in X-Men: Evolution, voiced by Trevor Devall. This version is initially a member of Magneto's Acolytes. Following Magneto's death and the Acolytes' disbandment, a reformed Pyro joins S.H.I.E.L.D. alongside the Brotherhood of Bayville in a vision of the future depicted in the two-part series finale "Ascension".
- St. John Allerdyce / Pyro appears in Wolverine and the X-Men, voiced by Nolan North. This version is a member of Magneto's Acolytes.
- Pyro appears in The Super Hero Squad Show, voiced by Steve Blum. This version is a member of Doctor Doom's Lethal Legion.
- Pyro appears in Lego Marvel Avengers: Strange Tails, voiced by Patrick Stump.
- Pyro appears in X-Men '97. This version is a member of the Brotherhood of Mutants.

=== Film ===
Aaron Stanford as Pyro in X-Men: The Last Stand.

- Pyro appears as a member of Magneto's Brotherhood of Mutants in early drafts for X-Men (2000), but had to be removed for the film to be greenlit by 20th Century Fox due to budget concerns. Nonetheless, Pyro makes a cameo appearance in the final film as a student of the Xavier Institute, portrayed by Alexander Burton.
- John Allerdyce / Pyro appears in X2 (2003), portrayed by Aaron Stanford. This version is initially a friend of fellow Xavier Institute students Iceman and Rogue who keeps a Zippo lighter on him at all times before he is tempted by Magneto into joining the Brotherhood.
- John Allerdyce / Pyro appears in X-Men: The Last Stand (2006), portrayed again by Aaron Stanford. Now sporting a miniature wrist-mounted flamethrower and serving as Magneto's right hand, he and the Brotherhood fight to stop a "mutant cure" from being produced until he is defeated by Iceman.
- John Allerdyce / Pyro appears in Deadpool & Wolverine (2024), portrayed again by Aaron Stanford. He works for Time Variance Authority agent Mr. Paradox, who tasked him with infiltrating Cassandra Nova's forces.

=== Video games ===
- Pyro appears as a boss in X-Men (1992), voiced by Kyle Hebert.
- Pyro appears as a playable character in the Game Boy Color version of X-Men: Mutant Academy.
- Pyro appears as a playable character in the Xbox version of X-Men: Next Dimension, voiced by Robin Atkin Downes.
- Pyro appears as a boss in X-Men Legends, voiced again by Robin Atkin Downes. This version is a member of the Brotherhood of Mutants.
- Pyro appears as a playable character in the PC version of X-Men Legends II: Rise of Apocalypse, voiced by John Kassir. This version is a member of the Brotherhood of Mutants.
- John Allerdyce / Pyro, based on the film incarnation, appears as a boss in X-Men: The Official Game, voiced by Steve Van Wormer.
- Pyro appears in X-Men: Destiny, voiced again by Steve Blum. This version is a member of the Brotherhood of Mutants.
- Pyro appears as a boss in Marvel Heroes, voiced by Crispin Freeman.
- Pyro appears in Lego Marvel Super Heroes, voiced by Andrew Kishino. This version is a member of the Brotherhood of Mutants.
- Pyro appears as a playable character in Marvel Strike Force.

=== Merchandise ===
- In 2020, Iron Studios released a statuette of John Allerdyce / Pyro as part of the X-Men Battle Diorama series. That same year, Hasbro released a Pyro action figure as part of the Marvel Legends action figure line.
- In 2024, LEGO released the LEGO Marvel X-Men: The X-Mansion set, which features Pyro's name written on one of the mansion's walls.
