= Magneto (film character) =

Fictional character of 2000–2019 X-Men film series

Erik Lehnsherr Magneto
- X-Men film series and Marvel Cinematic Universe character
- Michael Fassbender (left) and Ian McKellen as Magneto in X-Men: Days of Future Past (2014)
- First appearance: X-Men (2000)
- Based on: Magneto by: Stan Lee; Jack Kirby
- Adapted by: Bryan Singer; Tom DeSanto
- Portrayed by: Ian McKellen (Note: X-Men (2000), X2 (2003), The Last Stand (2006), The Wolverine (2013), Days of Future Past (2014), and Avengers: Doomsday (2026)); Michael Fassbender (Note: First Class (2011), Days of Future Past (2014), Apocalypse (2016), and Dark Phoenix (2019)); Other: Brett Morris (Note: X-Men (2000); child); Bill Milner (Note: First Class (2011); child)

In-universe information
- Full name: Erik Magnus Lehnsherr
- Alias: Henryk Gurzsky
- Species: Human mutant
- Occupation: Government agent; Terrorist; Steel mill worker; President of Genosha
- Affiliation: Brotherhood of Mutants; X-Men; Horsemen of Apocalypse
- Family: Edie Lehnsherr (mother); Jakob Lehnsherr (father)
- Spouse: Magda
- Children: Peter Maximoff (son); Nina Gurzsky (daughter)
- Religion: Judaism
- Origin: Germany
- Nationality: German Jew-American
- Auschwitz number: 214782

Magneto is a character primarily portrayed by Ian McKellen and Michael Fassbender in 20th Century Fox's X-Men film series. Based on the Marvel Comics character of the same name, he has appeared in eight installments of the franchise. McKellen played Magneto in the original trilogy films X-Men (2000), X2 (2003), and X-Men: The Last Stand (2006), in addition to making a cameo in The Wolverine (2013); while Fassbender portrayed a younger version of the character in the prequel films X-Men: First Class (2011), X-Men: Apocalypse (2016), and Dark Phoenix (2019). Both actors' iterations appeared in different time periods in X-Men: Days of Future Past (2014). McKellen's version of the character will appear in the Marvel Cinematic Universe film Avengers: Doomsday (2026).

As in the comics, Magneto is depicted as a powerful mutant, a subspecies of humans born with superhuman abilities, who can manipulate and generate magnetic fields. He is a Holocaust survivor who regards mutants as being superior to humans, and seeks to enable them to replace mankind as the dominant species on the planet.

== Fictional character biography ==
=== Early life ===
Erik Lehnsherr was born in 1930. His parents were Jews from Düsseldorf, Germany. During the Nazi regime, the family is taken to Auschwitz concentration camp, where Lehnsherr, then a boy, is separated from his parents, causing him to manifest his mutant power and bend the metal gate separating them until the Germans knock him unconscious. Shortly thereafter, the boy is taken to the office of Dr. Klaus Schmidt in the camp. Schmidt, who had observed Lehnsherr's earlier display, attempted to coerce him to demonstrate his power by having him move a coin. When Lehnsherr is unable to do it, Schmidt has Lehnsherr's mother brought in, and when that does not produce results, Schmidt shoots and kills her. This triggers Lehnsherr to use his powers to crush metal items in the room, killing the German guards by crushing their helmets, and destroying an adjacent laboratory room.

After the liberation of Auschwitz by Soviet forces in January 1945, the young Erik Lehnsherr emigrates to the United States by 1949, arriving at Ellis Island. Later in his life, Erik Lehnsherr had a brief relationship with a woman named Maximoff. For unknown reasons, he left her before their son Peter was born. During this time, Erik hunts for Nazi war criminals across the globe, including Schmidt, whom he tracks down on a cruiser near a dock in Miami. Lehnsherr is surprised by Schmidt's ally, the powerful mutant telepath Emma Frost, who casts him off the ship.

Another telepath, Charles Xavier, is also looking for Schmidt and senses Lehnsherr nearby while probing. Lehnsherr uses his magnetic powers to control the massive anchor and its chain to destroy the ship with, though Schmidt and his compatriots escape. Xavier rescues Lehnsherr in the water and brings him to Division X, a CIA project to bring mutants over to the side of the US government and prevent them from becoming hostile instead. Lehnsherr learns that Schmidt is himself secretly a mutant who worked with the Nazis out of convenience and has now assumed the identity of Sebastian Shaw and is working with the Russians instead, and the CIA hopes to use their own team of mutants to help in learning what Shaw's plans are and stop him. Lehnsherr also gets to know Raven, Xavier's shapeshifting mutant foster sister, and Hank McCoy, a mutant with a genius intellect. Lehnsherr and Xavier track down other mutants, Havok, Banshee, Darwin and Angel Salvadore until they have a team ready to challenge Shaw.

The group designates the sobriquet of Magneto for Lehnsherr as a codename. Going to the Soviet Union to track Shaw down, the team finds Emma Frost, who is restrained by Magneto. Xavier probes her mind and learns of Shaw's grand plan: to cause a nuclear war between the Soviet Union and other countries to accelerate the mutations of humanity through nuclear radiation, thereby rapidly swelling Shaw's ranks and ushering in a new era of a mutant-ruled planet. After practicing the use of his power further and learning to work with the team, Lehnsherr once again comes face to face with Shaw, who had hijacked a nuclear submarine and is now wearing a telepath-proof helmet designed by the Russians. Lehnsherr agrees with Shaw's ideas of mutant supremacy, but nonetheless makes it clear that he is still on a path of revenge for Shaw's murder of his mother.

Lehnsherr uses his magnetic powers to deprive Shaw of his helmet, allowing Xavier to freeze him. Lehnsherr takes the helmet himself to lock Xavier out while exacting his revenge on Shaw: using the very coin that Shaw once tried to make the young boy move, he forces it into his brain, killing him. He then addresses his team and Shaw's compatriots as his mutant brothers and sisters, using the missiles sent out by Soviet and American battleships now working together, turning them against the fleet. Xavier wrestles with Lehnsherr, making him lose control of the missiles and saving the men on the ships. Lehnsherr acknowledges the incompatibility of his and Xavier's philosophies and leaves Division X and the X-Men and embraces his mutant identity of Magneto.

He then frees Emma Frost from her military prison, hoping that she can replace Xavier as his new ally. After the assassination of John F. Kennedy in 1963, Erik Lehnsherr is captured by the government and imprisoned in a prison made of concrete beneath The Pentagon. He had in fact been trying to save the president, who he had learned was a mutant himself, but could not fully control the bullet and it still hit and killed Kennedy.

Due to the events of X-Men: Days of Future Past (2014), the X-Men film series branches off into two separate timelines starting in 1973.

=== Original Earth-10005 variant ===
In the original timeline, Lehnsherr and Xavier together later convince the young Jean Grey, a mutant girl of incredible power, to enroll for the Xavier School for Gifted Youngsters. Some time before the events of X-Men (2000), Magneto discovers that Hans von Shank, a Nazi war criminal whom he recognizes as one of his chief tormentors in Auschwitz, is still alive and imprisoned; he breaks into the old man's prison cell to kill him, but Xavier shows up and talks him out of it. However, Magneto's "mercy" is merely a ruse, as he secretly sends his lackey Sabretooth out to kill the man anyway shortly after. (Note: Joe Pruett (w), Mark Texeira (p), Jimmy Palmiotti (i), Chris Eliopoulos (let), Mike Marts (ed). X-Men Movie Prequel: Magneto (August 2000). Marvel Comics.) In the 2000 film, Magneto has Mystique and Toad capture Senator Robert Kelly, a vehement hater of mutants, and subject him to a massive dose of electromagnetic radiation which mutates him and later, unbeknownst to Magneto, kills him. This is merely Magneto's trial for a greater plan of mutating many of the world's heads of state at an international meeting on Ellis Island. The massive expenditure of his mutant powers necessary to power his machine for this purpose would kill Magneto, so he instead attempts to use the young mutant Rogue to channel her powers, which would kill her in his place. When the X-Men try to explain to Magneto that his plan will actually kill the world leaders, turning the whole world against mutants, he refuses to listen, but his plan is foiled by Wolverine and the X-Men, and Magneto is imprisoned in a specifically built prison of plastics.

In the sequel X2 (2003), Magneto is still a prisoner and is forced by the mutant-hating colonel and military scientist William Stryker to tell what he knows about Cerebro and Xavier's operations. Shortly after, Xavier visits him in his cell in person, but Stryker betrays Xavier and has him sedated and captured. Not long after, Magneto escapes after Mystique injects a security guard with excess iron. In order to stop Stryker, he and Mystique joins forces with the X-Men to save his old friend Xavier from Stryker's forces. They raid Stryker's military base, neutralizing the soldiers there. Stryker nearly succeeds in having his mutant illusionist son Jason trick Xavier into killing the world's mutant population with a specifically built copy of Cerebro, but Magneto is immune to their telepathic powers due to his helmet and stops Jason, only to have Mystique trick Jason to force Xavier to "kill all humans" instead. The X-Men stop this, but Magneto then leaves and traps Stryker with metal chains and leaves him to drown upon the rupture of a nearby dam.

In X-Men: The Last Stand (2006), Magneto frees Mystique from a mobile mutant prison, but abandons her after she is struck by a dart meant for him, containing a new "cure" for mutant powers derived from the mutant Leech, leaving her human and useless to him. Magneto sees this cure as an attack on mutant-kind as a whole, and raises an army of mutants, including a resurrected and corrupted Jean Grey, to stop the manufacturing of this cure. He fails to stop Jean, having been consumed by her own inner darkness, called the Phoenix, from killing his old friend Charles Xavier. Magneto then uproots the Golden Gate Bridge, taking the battle to the Worthington facility on Alcatraz Island, but ends up being depowered when Beast injects him with the serum. He later manages to move a metal chess piece slightly, hinting that his powers are not fully gone.

Two years after the events of The Wolverine (2013), Wolverine is approached by his old enemy Magneto (McKellen) as well as Professor X (Stewart) himself; Magneto warns him about "dark forces" that can bring about the end of mutants as an advert from Trask Industries plays on a television screen. Mystique's acts of assassinating Bolivar Trask in 1973 and being captured and experimented upon, alongside the events culminating with The Last Stand, eventually leads up to dark dystopian future where by 2023, most of the world's mutants have been exterminated by unstoppable super-Sentinels partially created from Mystique's DNA. Magneto and Charles Xavier devise a plan to send one of their own back through time through Kitty Pryde's secondary mutant power of chronoskimming, allowing her to project a person's consciousness back to their own past self and creating the possibility of changing the past into a more hopeful present and future. Since only Wolverine can survive being sent back half a century, Kitty sends his mind back to his 1973 self, before Raven could kill Trask and be captured. Back in 2023, Magneto protects them by fighting the Sentinels alongside other mutants, and is injured when impaled by debris from an explosion.

=== Revised Earth-10005 variant ===
==== Escape and second chance ====
In 1973, a time-travelling Logan convinces Hank McCoy and the young Charles Xavier to break Lehnsherr out of his prison made of concrete and sand beneath The Pentagon as part of an effort to avert a dark future. They go to Paris to stop Raven from assassinating Bolivar Trask to keep her from being captured. Trask escapes, and Lehnsherr decides to kill Raven to protect their future, but only manages to injure her, leaving her blood on the streets for Trask Industries to obtain. He later confronts Raven at an airport and tries to convince her that "killing one man isn't enough", but Raven still persists, intending to kill Trask at a meeting outside the White House in Washington, D.C. Realizing that the future they were trying to prevent may still come to pass, Lehnsherr comes up with his own plan. Tracking down the location of the eight Sentinel robot prototypes (made out of a non-magnetic "space-age polymer"), he infuses them with iron to be able to control them, and then heads to the Robert F. Kennedy Memorial Stadium, uprooting the stadium with his magnetic powers and transporting it to the White House while triggering the Sentinels to start firing wildly and securing the surroundings for him.

President Richard Nixon along with Trask, William Stryker and Secret Service men takes shelter in the White House Bunker, but Magneto brings it to the ground level and rips loose its door. He then makes a speech to the whole world where he warns it about the consequences of trying to challenge the mutants, declaring that mutant-kind is the future and will inherit the Earth from humanity. He intends to kill Nixon as a final warning, but the "president" is in fact Raven, who shoots Magneto with Stryker's non-magnetic gun and knocks him out. After Xavier convinces Raven to not kill Trask, she takes off Lehnsherr's helmet and leaves him to Xavier. Lehnsherr tells Xavier that if he lets the authorities have him, he's as good as dead, and then leaves.

==== Fugitive and Apocalypse ====
In 1983, Lehnsherr is still the world's most wanted man, living an unassuming life in Communist Poland under the alias of Henryk Górski. He is married to a lady named Magda, with whom he has a daughter, Nina. After using his powers to save a co-worker at a steel mill, the Polish authorities are alerted. Worried, Lehnsherr returns home only to find the authorities waiting for him with non-magnetic weapons, having taken Magda and Nina hostage to convince "Górski" to turn himself in to the Interpol. Though the men try to handle things peacefully, Nina herself is a mutant; her powers are triggered by the stress and she inadvertently lashes out at those threatening them. In the confusion, one of the men accidentally lets loose an arrow which kills Magda and Nina. Tearfully, Lehnsherr takes his daughter's metal necklace off her lifeless body and uses it to slaughter all the men, and then returns to the steel mill to kill his "co-workers" for selling him out. However, En Sabah Nur suddenly appears out of a portal, kills the men himself and then explains that he was the world's first mutant and has now been reawakened after millennia of being trapped beneath a pyramid in Egypt.

En Sabah Nur talks Magneto into joining him as one of his four Horsemen. They then head to Auschwitz where Erik Lehnsherr once suffered; En Sabah Nur enhances Magneto's powers and persuades him to raze this place of terror to the ground to rid himself of the shadows of the past. Under his new mentor's influence, the embittered Magneto starts to distort Earth's magnetic field, threatening the collapse of human civilization. When En Sabah Nur threatens Quicksilver and Raven, Magneto turns on him. He, Jean Grey, Scott Summers and Ororo Munroe destroy the ancient mutant with their combined powers. After the battle, Erik and Xavier reconcile, and Erik and Jean help reconstruct Xavier's destroyed school; however, Erik turns down Xavier's offer to stay and help teach. Peter Maximoff, who had aided in the fight against En Sabah Nur, decides not to tell Erik yet that he is Erik's son.

==== President of Genosha and the Dark Phoenix ====
In the 1990s, Lehnsherr becomes protector and president of an island of mutants in exile, Genosha. He is visited by a Jean Grey in distress. She asks him how he managed to stop hurting people; he explains that he stopped killing because he had already slain many in revenge and it ultimately didn't make him feel any better. He notices blood on her shirt and asks whose blood it is, but she refuses to answer. U.S. military forces arrive, but the target turns out to be Jean and not Lehnsherr, and she responds violently, forcing Lehnsherr to use his own powers to stop her from doing further damage. After she forces the troops to withdraw, Lehnsherr banishes Jean from Genosha, explaining that he's protecting its citizens from her. Hank McCoy then seeks Lehnsherr out, revealing that she killed Raven, and he now wants Lehnsherr's help in finding the out of control Jean to put an end to her rampage. After some more talk, Lehnsherr retrieves a duplicate of his old helmet that En Sabah Nur made for him and prepares for the confrontation. Erik meets Charles Xavier and some of the X-Men outside the house where Jean is; Xavier warns Erik that if the public sees the mutants fighting each other on the street, they will see them as "violent freaks", and all they had achieved for mankind's tolerance of them may be lost. In spite of this, Hank, Erik and a few of his Genoshian compatriots prepare to storm the mansion, causing the very damage Xavier warned them about. Inside the mansion, Erik finds Jean in company with Vuk, a woman unknown to him. He attempts to kill Jean, but she fights back, breaks his helmet and telekinetically throws him out of the building. Lehnsherr and his fellow mutants are captured by the military, who put collars on them to negate their powers and put them on a train. Unknown assailants arrive, in league with Vuk; they are all revealed to be alien shapeshifters who once lost their home planet to the Phoenix Force and now hope to exploit the flawed Jean, its newest host, with the hopes of clearing the Earth to be their new home. After the military is bested, a soldier on board disables the mutants' collars, allowing them to defeat the aliens. After the battle, Erik meets with Charles as a friend, bringing with him a chess board and finally reconciling from their old differences.

== Background and creation ==
=== Unrealized projects and other appearances ===
In the years before the 2000 X-Men film was finally released, a number of alternate screenplays were presented by various writers and ultimately dismissed. The oldest one somewhat featuring Magneto was a 1991 screenplay called Wolverine and the X-Men, written by Gary Goldman. Magneto is vastly rewritten to be an anti-mutant industrialist with magnetic superpowers named Thomas Prince, who recruits Jason Wyngarde from the X-Men and uses him to frame them for murder. This triggers a bout of anti-mutant hysteria while Prince runs a presidential campaign, but is eventually defeated. A 1994 screenplay from Andrew Kevin Walker begins with a Mutant Registration Act being passed while Sentinels are also being constructed. In response, Magneto and the Brotherhood of Mutants take over Manhattan, using their powers to shield it from the world and make it a safe haven for mutants. In a 1995 treatment also called Wolverine and the X-Men, written by Laeta Kalogridis, Magneto intends to use the Legacy Virus to wipe out humanity.

The film that eventually became X-Men: First Class was originally written to be a pure Magneto origin story called X-Men Origins: Magneto written by screenwriter Sheldon Turner. Turner was allegedly allowed to look through various back issues of Marvel Comics and select a character he thought had potential for a cinematic origin story; he decided upon Magneto. Turner had a storyline in mind already in late 2004; according to Turner, "[he] pitched a film that is almost ‘The Pianist’ meets ‘X-Men,’ about a guy who, after watching his family slaughtered, has an awakening of his powers and seeks revenge". The film would also have portrayed Charles Xavier as a young soldier in the Allied companies that liberated the concentration camp young Erik Lehnsherr was imprisoned in. In 2008 it was reported that 20th Century Fox had the project put on hold to first release the Wolverine film and determine if it was a success or not before deciding whether to go through with another X-Men Origin film or not.

In the film Logan (2017), inspired by Old Man Logan and set in the year 2029 seemingly in a separate timeline, (Note: The director of the film, James Mangold, did not specify when asked if Logan was set after the post-2023 Days of Future Past timeline seen at the end of that film. Given this, and the fact that Logan mentions that mutants hadn't been born in 25 years which would contradict that film’s ending, the film likely takes place on an unrelated timeline.) Magneto is not mentioned and is, along with nearly all other known mutants save for Wolverine and Charles Xavier, assumed to be dead, likely wiped out by anti-mutagenic substances added to many types of food which deprives mutants of their powers and make them sick while also disabling all newborn babies from being born with X-factor genes. It is also possible that one of Charles Xavier's telepathic seizures killed him. According to longtime franchise producer Lauren Shuler Donner, the Xavier/Magneto dynamics had run its course and while it will always be essential to the X-Men mythos, she thought that there were other X-Men stories left to be told. In the American superhero television series The Gifted, also taking place in an alternate timeline, where the X-Men, the Brotherhood of Mutants, and their leadership (including Magneto) are said to have "disappeared", Emma Dumont portrays Magneto's daughter Lorna "Polaris" Dane, who has inherited his mutant ability of controlling magnetism. Initially "unstable" due to her bipolar disorder, the first season follows Polaris while pregnant, as she struggles with whether to "accept the mantle of her birthright, [whether] it [is] her job to be Magneto in his absence?" culminating in the first-season finale and second season premiere, in which Polaris gives birth to her daughter, Magneto's granddaughter, whom she names Dawn.

Michael Fassbender reportedly originally filmed a scene for the Marvel Cinematic Universe (MCU) film Doctor Strange in the Multiverse of Madness appearing as his character's Earth-838 variant; However, the scenes were ultimately cut from the theatrical release. McKellen is set to reprise his role in the upcoming MCU film, Avengers: Doomsday.

=== Casting ===
Before Ian McKellen was cast for the 2000 film, Christopher Lee, Terence Stamp, and David Hemblen (who voiced Magneto for the 1992-1997 animated series) were considered for the role.

Matthew Vaughn had already cast James McAvoy as Charles Xavier before starting to go through auditioners for the Magneto role; he quickly recognized the acting chemistry between McAvoy and Michael Fassbender upon pairing them together. Actors who auditioned for the younger Magneto in the prequels include Aaron Taylor-Johnson, Andrew Garfield, Jack Huston, Eddie Redmayne and Frank Dillane.

== Characterization ==
=== Comparison between comic and cinematic portrayal ===
Some aspects of Magneto's character have been changed, added or omitted from his comic book counterpart. In the books, Quicksilver / Peter Maximoff has a twin sister named Wanda, also called Scarlet Witch; for a long period of time they were considered to be Magneto's children. (Note: Currently retconned in Uncanny Avengers #4 (2013).) In the films, Peter has at least one sister who is unnamed; an extended scene in X-Men: Days of Future Past - The Rogue Cut hints at the two having another unnamed sister. Bryan Singer has made it clear that the cut (from the theatrical film) scene is merely a nod to the fans who would get the reference, since in the comics Magneto has a daughter named Lorna Dane, also known as Polaris, with powers virtually identical to Magneto's. Peter's younger sister is never referred to as Wanda and it is only confirmed that Peter himself is the offspring of Erik Lehnsherr in the film series, leaving the paternity of the sister(s) unknown. Singer had said about Peter's unnamed sister in X-Men: Days of Future Past,

Is that the Scarlet Witch? No, that's his little sister. I even had a line which I cut, where Quicksilver's mother says to the little girl, 'Go up and bug your sister,' and the little girl says, 'She bugs me!' You never see the older sister, but it was to imply that there is an older sister for comic book fans. I ended up cutting it.

The role of Sebastian Shaw in Magneto's backstory in X-Men: First Class is unique to this film, while Mystique barely had any association with Magneto in the comics, but is his most trusted henchwoman in the 2000-2006 trilogy and has a complicated relationship with him in the prequel films. Magneto also never helped found the X-Men like in the films, where he is shown to have helped Charles Xavier organize the team when they were still friends.

In the comics, Magneto's real name has been revealed to be Max Eisenhart, with Erik Magnus Lehnsherr being an assumed identity; in the films, this name is never used, only that of Erik Lehnsherr.

=== Powers and abilities ===
Magneto has been classified as a "Class 4" mutant, being described as greater than Class 3 while Jean Grey is the only Class 5 mutant Charles Xavier knows of. Magneto in the film series has been shown to be able to control only ferromagnetism, meaning he can only manipulate a limited number of ferromagnetic metals such as iron, nickel, cobalt or adamantium, an alloy including iron. As such, he would not be able to stop most types of bullets, explaining why he failed to save John F. Kennedy. The force necessary to move the massive Golden Gate Bridge (in The Last Stand) would require a force a million times stronger than the strongest magnet created by humans so far.

== Reception ==
For his 2011 portrayal of the character in X-Men: First Class, Fassbender won an IGN Award for Best Villain, a Los Angeles Film Critics Association award for Best Actor, and a National Board of Review Spotlight Award. He was also nominated for Scream Awards for Best Fantasy Actor and Breakout Performance – Male.

The Fassbender version of Magneto has been cited, alongside Heath Ledger's Joker from The Dark Knight, as one of the inspirations Michael B. Jordan had to play N'Jadaka / Erik "Killmonger" Stevens in the Marvel Cinematic Universe (MCU) film Black Panther, feeling that Fassbender's portrayal motivated him to deliver an awesome performance as a comic book movie villain. MCU writer Jeff Loveness would likewise cite the X-Men films version of Magneto's dynamic with Charles Xavier as a template for the one Kang the Conqueror and Janet van Dyne have in the film.

== Merchandise ==
In 2000, Toy Biz released a series of action figures including a 10" Magneto figure. As part of the 2000 film's 20th anniversary in 2020, Hasbro released action figures in the Marvel Legends series from the film, with Magneto being released in a two-set with Professor X. The Magneto figure comes with replaceable heads for both Michael Fassbender and Ian McKellen's versions of Magneto.
