= Avalanche (character) =

Two fictional characters appearing in Marvel Comics

Dominikos Ioannis Petrakis Avalanche
- Avalanche as seen in the "X-Corps" arc of "Uncanny X-Men".

Publication information
- Publisher: Marvel Comics
- First appearance: The Uncanny X-Men #141 (Jan. 1981)
- Created by: Chris Claremont (writer); John Byrne (artist)

In-story information
- Alter ego: Dominikos Ioannis Petrakis
- Species: Human mutant
- Team affiliations: X-Corps; Freedom Force; Project Wideawake; Brotherhood of Mutants; S.W.O.R.D.
- Notable aliases: Dominic Janos Petros, Jon Bloom, Dominic Szilard, Nick
- Abilities: Geological manipulation via seismic wave generation from his hands

Avalanche (Dominikos Ioannis Petrakis) is the name of two characters appearing in American comic books published by Marvel Comics. Each character is usually depicted as an enemy of the X-Men.

The Dominikos Petrakis version of Avalanche is a Cretan mutant who possesses the ability to generate seismic waves from his hands that are strong enough to create earthquakes of varying sizes and to disintegrate any substance other than living tissue. He has been a member of the Brotherhood of Mutants and Freedom Force.

The animated series X-Men: Evolution portrays a different version of Avalanche named Lance Alvers, a misguided mutant teenager and romantic love interest of the X-Men's Shadowcat.

== Publication history ==
Created by writer Chris Claremont and artist/co-writer John Byrne, the Dominikos Petrakis version of Avalanche first appeared in The Uncanny X-Men #141 (Jan. 1981).

During the Krakoan Age, Avalanche was among the villains given a second chance on Krakoa. In January 2022, Marvel Comics ran a voting contest where voters could pick between one of ten characters to join the X-Men, with Avalanche being among the candidates. In July 2022, Avalanche appeared in a digital comic released as a companion to the second Hellfire Gala. This comic revealed that the election had also been held in-universe, with Avalanche losing the vote.

== Fictional character biography ==
=== Dominikos Petrakis ===
Avalanche is an immigrant from the Greek island of Crete. There, he lived a quiet life until Mystique invites him to join her new Brotherhood of Mutants. During his first public appearance with the Brotherhood, the team unsuccessfully attempts to assassinate Senator Robert Kelly, who believes that mutants pose a mortal threat to humanity. The X-Men arrive to stop the assassination and battle the new Brotherhood. After escaping the fray, Avalanche continues his support of mutant supremacy via terrorist and criminal activities and battling the Avengers with the Brotherhood.

Avalanche briefly leaves the Brotherhood and attempts to blackmail California into paying him an enormous sum to prevent him from causing mass destruction. Avalanche fights the Hulk alongside Landslide on this occasion and suffers broken arms when he attempts to use his powers against the Hulk.

Mystique offers the Brotherhood of Mutants's services to the United States government. Their first mission under their new name of Freedom Force is to capture Magneto on behalf of the federal government. When Freedom Force is disbanded after the botched mission in the Gulf War, Avalanche continues to work for the government as part of Project Wideawake. However, he leaves after learning that his friend Pyro has contracted the Legacy Virus.

By the time the X-Men establish themselves in San Francisco, Avalanche, going by the alias "Nick", establishes a bar in order to make a living away from crime. When the X-Men moved their headquarters to San Francisco, Petros was frightened that they would eventually come for him for his past crimes. As he was packing in hopes of leaving his new-found life, the X-Men warn that they have established a truce, but will be back if he ever decides to return to crime.

When Norman Osborn starts his war against mutants in the heart of San Francisco, Gambit sees Avalanche during the riots with Erg and when Ares makes himself known, Avalanche attacks him by causing the earth to rise up under him. Ares then knocks him out by choking him. He is seen one more time, sitting drunk in his own bar together with other mutants. They are angry that humans are trying to prevent new mutant births and Avalanche participates in the riot. He has the unfortunate circumstance of being paired up against Daken, who easily dodges the worried Avalanche's tremor and was about to slice him. He is taken into custody along with several other mutants who participated in the riots. Avalanche and the other imprisoned mutants are freed by the X-Force and he becomes a resident of Utopia.

While Utopia and all of San Francisco are trapped in an energy dome created by Bastion, and the mutant race face extermination at the hands of Nimrod Sentinels from the future, Avalanche is among many of Utopia's non-X-Men residents who battle alongside their former rivals. As an "X-Man", Avalanche is also called in by Cyclops during the Fear Itself storyline to battle Kuurth.

Avalanche is kidnapped by the Red Skull, who removes part of his brain and replaces it with a machine that forces Avalanche to attack New York City. As Captain America tries to stop him, he claimed that "the inciting act is complete" and jumps to his death.

Avalanche is among the mutants resurrected and residing on Krakoa.

=== Unknown ===
A second, unnamed version of Avalanche is brainwashed by Mesmero and forced to join the Brotherhood of Mutants, which is secretly funded by anti-mutant activist Lydia Nance. Avalanche's first mission with the Brotherhood of Mutants is to kidnap Bill de Blasio, mayor of New York City. The X-Men arrive and defeat the Brotherhood of Mutants, who are arrested by arriving S.H.I.E.L.D. agents.

Avalanche and Pyro attack a yacht owned by the Heritage Initiative during a fundraiser. The two battle the X-Men before escaping. When Mesmero states that the Brotherhood of Mutants are still under Lydia Nance's paycheck, Pyro leaves the Brotherhood. He has learned of Nance's anti-mutant views and no longer wants to work for her. Avalanche then demands to get Pyro's cut.

Avalanche joins another new Brotherhood of Mutants, led by Magneto's clone Joseph. During a battle with the X-Men, Avalanche mocks Magik, prompting her to stab him in the heart with her soulsword. Avalanche survives this encounter and later joins S.W.O.R.D. as an agent.

== Powers and abilities ==
The Dominikos Petrakis incarnation of Avalanche is a mutant with the superhuman ability to generate powerful seismic waves from his hands, creating highly destructive effects. The waves can cause an inorganic object to shatter or crumble into dust and has in recent years been shown to affect organic matter as well. When directed against large objects like buildings or upon the earth itself, the seismic waves can produce effects similar to those of an earthquake or avalanche within limited areas. Avalanche need not touch an object to affect it; he can direct the waves against it from some distance away. Avalanche himself is immune to the generation of his own vibratory waves. However, if the seismic waves were reflected back at him, he would be injured. Avalanche is a fair hand-to-hand combatant and received unarmed combat training while a member of Freedom Force.

Avalanche wears an armored battle suit that gives him enhanced resistance to injury, up to and including protecting him from a land mine. While a member of Freedom Force, he used a two-way radio device for communication with other Freedom Force members.

The unidentified version of Avalanche is a mutant with the same abilities as the first Avalanche. Unlike the first Avalanche, he is able to affect organic tissue.

== Other versions ==
=== Age of Apocalypse ===
An alternate universe version of Dominikos Petrakis / Avalanche appears in "Age of Apocalypse". He is among the select mutants who are approached by Mister Sinister and offered to join his Elite Mutant Force. Avalanche refuses Sinister's offer, for which he is captured. During an escape attempt, Avalanche is killed and his corpse given to Dark Beast for experimentation.

=== Marvel Zombies ===
A zombified alternate universe version of Dominikos Petrakis / Avalanche appears in Marvel Zombies: Dead Days.

=== House of M ===
An alternate universe version of Dominikos Petrakis / Avalanche appears in "House of M". This version is a member of the Brotherhood, an NYPD strikeforce.

=== Old Man Logan ===
An alternate universe version of Dominikos Petrakis / Avalanche appears in "Old Man Logan".

== In other media ==
=== Television ===
- The Dominikos Petrakis incarnation of Avalanche appears in X-Men: The Animated Series, voiced by Rod Coneybeare. This version is a member of the Brotherhood of Mutants.
- An original incarnation of Avalanche named Lance Alvers appears in X-Men: Evolution, voiced by Christopher Grey. This version is a teenage thug and high schooler who leads the Brotherhood of Bayville whenever Mystique or Magneto is not around. Initially aggressive, Alvers slowly matures over the course of the series. Additionally, he displays a rivalry with Scott Summers throughout and initially antagonizes Kitty Pryde during the first season before developing mutual romantic feelings for and dating her during the second season, which leads to him briefly leaving the Brotherhood to maintain their relationship. While they break up in the third season, they eventually rekindle their relationship by the series finale, with Alvers and the other Brotherhood members going on to reform and join S.H.I.E.L.D. in a vision of the future that Professor X has.
- The Dominikos Petrakis incarnation of Avalanche appears in Wolverine and the X-Men, voiced by James Patrick Stuart. This version is a member of the Brotherhood of Mutants who speaks with a strong Greek accent and sports a goatee.

=== Video games ===
- The Dominikos Petrakis incarnation of Avalanche appears as a boss in X-Men Legends, voiced by Peter Lurie. This version is a member of the Brotherhood of Mutants.
- The Dominikos Petrakis incarnation of Avalanche appears as a boss, later unlockable character, in Marvel: Avengers Alliance.

=== Merchandise ===
Dominic Petros / Avalanche received a figure in the "X-Men Classics" toy line.
