= Lego Marvel Super Heroes =

2013 action-adventure game

- Developers: Traveller's Tales; TT Fusion (Universe in Peril)
- Publishers: Warner Bros. Interactive Entertainment; Feral Interactive (MacOS)
- Director: Arthur Parsons
- Producer: Tom Johnson
- Designer: Jon Burton
- Programmer: Steve Harding
- Artist: Leon Warren
- Writer: Mark Hoffmeier
- Composer: Rob Westwood
- Platforms: Microsoft Windows; OS X; PlayStation 3; PlayStation 4; Wii U; Xbox 360; Xbox One; Nintendo Switch; Universe in Peril; Android; iOS; Nintendo 3DS; Nintendo DS; PlayStation Vita
- Release: 22 October 2013: Xbox 360, Wii U, PlayStation 3, Windows; NA: 22 October 2013; AU: 13 November 2013; EU: 15 November 2013; JP: 22 January 2015 PlayStation 4; NA: 15 November 2013; EU: 29 November 2013 Xbox One; NA/EU: 22 November 2013 Nintendo 3DS, Nintendo DS; NA: 18 February 2014; EU: 21 February 2014 MacOS; WW: 8 May 2014 Switch; WW: 8 October 2021
- Genre: Action-adventure
- Modes: Single-player, multiplayer

Lego Marvel Super Heroes is a 2013 Lego-themed action-adventure video game developed by Traveller's Tales and published by Warner Bros. Interactive Entertainment for the PlayStation 3, Xbox 360, Wii U, PlayStation 4, Xbox One, Nintendo Switch, and Microsoft Windows, and by Feral Interactive for OS X. The game features gameplay similar to other Lego titles, such as Lego Star Wars: The Complete Saga and Lego Batman 2: DC Super Heroes, alternating between various action-adventure sequences and puzzle-solving scenarios. The handheld version of the game by TT Fusion was released under the title Lego Marvel Super Heroes: Universe in Peril for iOS, Android, Nintendo DS, Nintendo 3DS, and PlayStation Vita. A Nintendo Switch version was released on October 8, 2021.

The game's storyline sees various heroes from the Marvel Universe joining forces to foil the schemes of Doctor Doom and Loki, who have also recruited a number of villains to aid them and seek to conquer the Earth using the Doom Ray of Doom, a device built from shards of the Silver Surfer's board called "Cosmic Bricks". Lego Marvel Super Heroes received generally positive reviews and is currently the best-selling Lego video game of all time, surpassing Lego Star Wars: The Complete Saga. A spin-off titled Lego Marvel's Avengers was released on 26 January 2016, and a sequel titled Lego Marvel Super Heroes 2 was released on 14 November 2017.

== Gameplay ==
The player can visit several locations in the game such as the S.H.I.E.L.D. Helicarrier.

Following the gameplay style of past Lego titles, players are able to control 180 characters from the Marvel Universe, each with their own unique abilities. For example, Spider-Man can swing on his webs and use his Spider-Sense while the Hulk, who is larger than the standard minifigures, can throw large objects. Additionally, Hulk and his alter ego Bruce Banner appear as separate playable characters that can be swapped between at will, with Banner being able to access computers that Hulk cannot. Galactus was chosen as the main antagonist of the game. The main setting of Lego Marvel Super Heroes is a Lego version of Manhattan, with players able to explore both Liberty Island and Ryker's Island.

The creative team has also incorporated Marvel Comics co-creator Stan Lee in the game. He is a part of missions called "Stan Lee in Peril", similar to "Citizen in Peril" missions from previous games. Lee also appears as a playable character and has several of the other characters' abilities, such as Spider-Man's webbing, a combination of the Human Torch's heat beam and Cyclops's optic blast, Mister Fantastic's grappling, Wolverine's adamantium skeleton, and Hulk's transformation.

Players can also explore the Marvel version of New York City, though access to the full character roster as well as the ability to enter buildings is locked until the completion of the main story levels. Bonus missions are narrated by Deadpool and take place in buildings with their own storylines. There are a total of 15 missions in the main single-player campaign, followed by 11 side missions.

Several characters, such as Iron Man, Nick Fury, Phil Coulson, Captain America, Black Widow, Hulk, Hawkeye, Loki, Thor, and Maria Hill, are modeled after their Marvel Cinematic Universe counterparts.

== Plot ==
While searching the universe for planets for his master Galactus to consume, Silver Surfer is captured by Doctor Doom, and his board shattered into multiple "Cosmic Bricks". Having been warned about Galactus' upcoming arrival on Earth by an imprisoned Loki, Doom aims to build his "Doom Ray of Doom" using these bricks, which will allow the pair to defeat Galactus and then take over the world. Meanwhile, Nick Fury enlists Earth's heroes to retrieve the bricks before they fall into the wrong hands.

Sandman and Abomination, hired by Doom to retrieve a brick, hold Grand Central Station hostage for it, but are defeated by Iron Man, Hulk, and Spider-Man. The brick is left in the Fantastic Four's care at the Baxter Building, but Doctor Octopus steals it, forcing Mister Fantastic and Captain America to pursue him. Aided by Spider-Man when the fight goes through the Daily Bugle, they defeat him in Times Square, but he tosses the Brick to Green Goblin. Tasked with retrieving it, Black Widow, Hawkeye, and Spider-Man infiltrate Oscorp, but are forced to fight Venom while the Green Goblin escapes.

Iron Man and Hulk respond to a prison riot at the Raft, orchestrated by Magneto, Mystique, and Sabretooth to break out Loki and other villains. Aided by Wolverine, they defeat the escaped inmates and Sabretooth, but Magneto destroys Iron Man's armor and escapes with Mystique and Loki. Captain America and Iron Man go to Stark Tower so that the latter can retrieve his latest suit, only to encounter Loki, Mandarin, and Aldrich Killian, who have hacked J.A.R.V.I.S., turning it against the heroes. After restoring J.A.R.V.I.S. back to normal, they defeat the Mandarin and Killian, but Loki escapes with one of Stark's experimental Arc Reactors.

After S.H.I.E.L.D. tracks the reactor's signature to a Hydra base beneath the Empire State Building, Black Widow and Hawkeye investigate and discover that the Red Skull and Arnim Zola are building a portal generator powered by the stolen reactor, which Loki uses to travel to Asgard. Human Torch, Captain America, and Wolverine arrive to help defeat Red Skull, but inadvertently damage the portal generator. Pursuing Loki with Thor's help, the trio discover that he invaded Asgard, aided by the Frost Giants, and has stolen the Tesseract. Loki unleashes the Destroyer upon the heroes, but they defeat it and retrieve the Tesseract, despite Loki's escape.

Wolverine takes the Tesseract to the X-Mansion for Professor X to analyze it, but Doom dispatches the Brotherhood of Mutants to retrieve it. The X-Men defeat Toad, Pyro, and Juggernaut, but fail to prevent Magneto and Mystique from stealing the Tesseract. Tracking it down to Latveria, Nick Fury and the Fantastic Four storm Castle Doom, defeat Green Goblin, and rescue Silver Surfer, but Doom and Loki escape.

Iron Man, Thor, and Spider-Man later infiltrate a A.I.M. submarine where Doom is hiding out, defeating MODOK and capturing Doom with Jean Grey's help. However, Magneto magnetically controls the Statue of Liberty and uses it to rescue Doom. Despite Mister Fantastic, Wolverine, and Hulk's attempts to stop him after defeating Mastermind, Magneto brings the Statue to an island filled with dinosaurs from the Savage Land, whereupon he uses a nuclear core stolen from Roxxon Industries to power his space station, Asteroid M. Captain America, Storm, and Thing pursue Magneto and defeat Rhino and Mystique, but fail to prevent the station's launch.

Iron Man, Thor, and Spider-Man board Asteroid M and defeat Magneto, before confronting Doom and Loki, who have finished building the Doom Ray. After Doom incapacitates Iron Man and Thor, Captain America, the Thing, and Storm arrive to help Spider-Man defeat him. However, Loki reveals that he had manipulated Doom into building a flying pod, powered by the Tesseract, that will allow him to control Galactus and destroy Earth and Asgard. After Galactus arrives to consume Earth, Loki mind-controls him into destroying Asteroid M, though everyone aboard survives.

To stop Loki and Galactus, the heroes and villains form an uneasy alliance, and manage to open a portal to an unknown region of space and send the two through it, destroying Loki's pod and freeing Galactus from his control in the process. While Nick Fury recovers the Tesseract, the heroes decide to give the villains a head start to avoid capture. With his board rebuilt, Silver Surfer recovers his powers and leaves Earth, promising to lead Galactus far away.

In a mid-credits scene, Fury oversees the repair of the Statue of Liberty, when the Guardians of the Galaxy arrive, having been called earlier to help against Galactus, but they arrived too late. Star-Lord warns Fury that there is something else threatening Earth. Later while having lunch with the construction crew, Fury encounters Black Panther, who was looking for his cat Mr. Tiddles and tells Fury that the people of Wakanda are grateful to him.

== Development ==
Following the revival of the Super Heroes theme in 2012, TT Games and The LEGO Group decided to develop a Marvel-based game, as the studio had already created several Batman games for DC. Early on, the studio considered adapting the plot of The Avengers; however, TT Games felt that a single film wouldn't provide enough content and that the broader Marvel universe would be better represented with an original story instead.

The story was developed in reverse: developers were first asked which characters and locations they wanted to include, and the writing team then wrote a story that incorporated all of those elements.

The handheld version, LEGO Marvel Super Heroes: Universe in Peril, was intended to mark a new direction for handheld LEGO games. Unlike previous handheld titles, the game was developed with the mobile version in mind first and then later ported to portable systems rather than the other way around. This decision was reportedly unpopular among the development team, with some staff even leaving the project over it. Following the game's poor reception and feedback, the mobile-focused approach was quickly dropped, and future handheld releases were designed to resemble their console counterparts much more closely.

== Reception ==
Reception

Aggregate score
Aggregator	Score
Metacritic	(PS4) 83/100 (PC) 78/100 (X360) 80/100 (PS3) 82/100 (Wii U) 82/100

Review scores
Publication	Score
AllGame	4.5/5
Computer and Video Games	7/10
Destructoid	8.5/10
Eurogamer	9/10
Game Informer	9/10
GameSpot	7/10
IGN	9/10
Nintendo Life	9/10
Play	90/100
Polygon	8.5/10
The Escapist	4/5

Lego Marvel Super Heroes received generally positive reviews upon release. Among its strengths, reviewers cited its humor, variety of missions, characters, and open-world gameplay. According to Metacritic, it received an average review score of 83/100 based on 22 reviews, indicating "generally positive reviews".

Steve Butts of IGN gave the game a 9 out of 10, praising it for being: "the best thing to happen to the Marvel games since 2006's Marvel: Ultimate Alliance". He added, "it's a warm and witty, multi-layered approach to the brand that ties in hundreds of Marvel's most iconic characters, settings, and stories". Steve Hannley of Hardcore Gamer gave the game a 4/5, calling it "one of the best Marvel games this generation". Game Informer gave the game a 9 out of 10, while Polygon gave the game an 8.5 out of 10. GameZone's Matt Liebl, regarding the PS4 version, stated, "on a console filled with shooters like Killzone and Call of Duty, TT Games' Lego Marvel Super Heroes presents a nice break from the complex sports titles and intense shooters that overrun the console".

During the 17th Annual D.I.C.E. Awards, the Academy of Interactive Arts & Sciences nominated Lego Marvel Super Heroes for "Family Game of the Year".

Warner Bros. Interactive Entertainment president David Haddad has stated that Lego Marvel Super Heroes is the best-selling LEGO video game of all time.

A spin-off titled Lego Marvel's Avengers was released on 26 January 2016. A sequel titled Lego Marvel Super Heroes 2 was released for Microsoft Windows, Nintendo Switch, PlayStation 4, and Xbox One on 14 November 2017.

== Downloadable content ==
Two add-on packs were released for the game. The first, Super Pack, included 7 characters: Dark Phoenix, Winter Soldier, Falcon, Symbiote Spider-Man, Hawkeye (classic), Beta Ray Bill, Thanos and A-Bomb as well as two vehicles: The Spider Buggy and Hawkeye's Sky Cycle, and 10 races that can only be done with the new vehicles. The second, Asgard Character Pack, was released in November to coincide with the release of Thor: The Dark World, and included 8 characters: Malekith, Kurse, Sif, Volstagg, Odin, Hogun, Fandral and Jane Foster.

== See also ==
- Lego Super Heroes
- Lego Marvel's Avengers
- Lego Marvel Super Heroes 2

== Bibliography ==
- LEGO Marvel Super Heroes : Prima's Official Game Guide. Authored by Sir Michael Knight and Nick von Esmarch. Published by Dorling Kindersley, 2013. ISBN 0-80416-132-1
- Lego Marvel Super Heroes Strategy Guide & Game Walkthrough - Cheats, Tips, Tricks, and More!. Authored by 2up Guides. Published by Createspace Independent Publishing Platform, 2017. ISBN 1-97750-335-7
