= Savage Land Mutates =

Group of mutants in Marvel Comics

Publication information
- Publisher: Marvel Comics
- First appearance: X-Men #62 (November 1969)
- Created by: Roy Thomas (writer); Neal Adams (artist)

In-story information
- Base(s): Savage Land
- Member(s): Membership

The Savage Land Mutates is a supervillain group appearing in American comic books published by Marvel Comics. Their creators were writer Roy Thomas and penciler Neal Adams. Within the comic books, the group is based in the Savage Land, a hidden Antarctic environment inhabited by dinosaurs and primitive humans.

== Publication history ==
The Savage Land Mutates first appeared in The X-Men #62 (November 1969) and were created by Roy Thomas and Neal Adams.

== Fictional team biography ==
The Savage Land Mutates were originally humanoid inhabitants of the Savage Land who were genetically altered by Magneto to serve as his troops. They clashed with the X-Men and Ka-Zar on multiple occasions. On one occasion, they turned Spider-Man into the Man-Spider and Angel into a bird monster. They have also encountered the Avengers. The Savage Land Mutates are usually led by Sauron, Brainchild, or Zaladane.

During the "Secret Empire" storyline, Sauron returns to the Savage Land to claim leadership over the mutates. He ruled until Vertigo, Lupa, and Whiteout turned on him, driving him out of the Citadel. A resistance group of Avengers, searching for Cosmic Cube fragments, teamed up with Sauron to investigate, as they speculated that the mutates may have found it. The group was then ambushed by Gaza riding a Tyrannosaurus rex. He revealed that Sauron only kept the three female mutates at his side because they were desirable and not a threat to him. As the group arrived at the Citadel, Sauron attempted to betray them, but was quickly defeated by Mockingbird. She then bartered with Lupa, Vertigo, and Whiteout, offering to give them Sauron in exchange for the fragment. The trio refuse, as the fragment enabled them to overthrow Sauron and push the Savage Land towards peace. The two groups clashed, with Vertigo confronting Sauron with the knowledge that she had been cloned and killed many times. During the skirmish, Sauron managed to grab the shard but was defeated by the combined effort of both groups. Quicksilver then grabbed the shard and escaped. Lupa, Vertigo, and Whiteout allowed the group to leave in exchange for locking Sauron in a dungeon.

Amphibius later tells Sauron and the other Savage Land Mutates that Magneto's Asteroid M has risen from the sea, but they did not want to go find him. Worm took control of Barbarus, Lupo, and Sauron and commandeered a ship to go find Magneto. When threatened by the Japanese military, Sauron attacked an armored car, causing an international incident. Cannonball, Sunspot, and Warlock investigated and found the Savage Land Mutates on the deck of the ship. Cannonball fought Sauron in the skies while Karma discovered that the Savage Land Mutates were immune to her powers of psychic persuasion. Cannonball managed to defeat Sauron while the other New Mutants defeated the Savage Land Mutates. After learning why the Savage Land Mutates were on the ship, Karma tellls Worm, Sauron, Barbarus, and Lupo that they are now in charge of Asteroid M and Magneto. Worm then orders the Savage Land Mutates to return to the Savage Land.

== Membership ==
Character	Real Name	Joined In	Notes
Original incarnation
Magneto ("The Creator")	Max Eisenhardt	X-Men #62 (November 1969)	The creator and the original leader of the Savage Land Mutates.
Amphibius	Unknown	X-Men #62 (November 1969)	A Swamp Men mutate who possesses a frog-like appearance and abilities.
Barbarus	Unknown	X-Men #62 (November 1969)	A Swamp Men mutate who possesses four arms and superhuman strength and durability.
Brainchild	Unknown	X-Men #62 (November 1969)	A Swamp Men mutate who possesses an enlarged cranium and psychic powers. He is often second-in-command of the group.
Equilibrius	Unknown	X-Men #62 (November 1969)	A mutate who can induce sensations of vertigo in anyone who looks him in the eyes.
Gaza	Unknown	X-Men #62 (November 1969)	A Swamp Men mutate with enhanced strength and durability. He is blind, but makes up for it with an additional power known as radar sense.
Lupo	Unknown	X-Men #62 (November 1969)	A Swamp Men mutate who possesses a wolf-like appearance, superhuman physical abilities and senses, and the ability to psionically command canine creatures.
Piper	Unknown	X-Men #62 (November 1969)	A mutate who can control animals using his flute.
Lorelei	Lani Ubana	X-Men #63 (December 1969)	A mutate who can hypnotize men via her voice. She was also briefly a member of the Brotherhood of Mutants.
Second incarnation Led by Sauron. Included original members Amphibius, Barbarus, Brainchild, Gaza, and Lupo.
Sauron	Karl Lykos	Marvel Fanfare #1 (March 1982)	A mutate who can drain life energy and transform into a humanoid Pteranodon.
Vertigo	Unknown	Marvel Fanfare #1 (March 1982)	A mutate who can emit waves that affect the equilibrioception of anyone hit by them.
Third incarnation Led by Zaladane. Included original members Amphibius, Barbarus, Brainchild, Gaza, and Lupo.
Zaladane	Zala Dane	Uncanny X-Men #249 (October 1989)	High Priestess to the Savage Land deity Garokk, Zaladane sought power for herself and claimed the role of Empress of the Savage Land. She was previously an associate of the mutates, having worked with them in prior appearances.
Whiteout	Unknown	Uncanny X-Men #249 (October 1989)	A mutate who can emit blinding flashes of light.
Worm	Unknown	Uncanny X-Men #250 (November 1989)	A mutate who possesses a worm-like lower-body and can secrete mucus that overrides the nervous system.
Fourth incarnation Led by Brainchild. Included original members Amphibius, Barbarus, Gaza, Vertigo, and Whiteout. Later appearances also included Piper and Worm.
Lupa	Unknown	X-Treme X-Men: Savage Land #2 (December 2001)	A Swamp Men mutate who possesses a similar appearance and abilities to Lupo. It is unknown if the two are related.
Leash	Unknown	X-Treme X-Men: Savage Land #3 (January 2002)	A mutate who can psychically imprison another being's astral essence, rendering them catatonic or under her mental control.

== In other media ==
- The Savage Land Mutates appear in X-Men: The Animated Series, consisting of Sauron, Vertigo, Brainchild (voiced by Robert Bockstael), Amphibius (voiced by Peter McCowatt), Barbarus (voiced by Bob Zeidel in his first appearance and Peter McCowatt in his second appearance), and Lupo.
- The Savage Land Mutates appear in the X-Men '97 episode "Bright Eyes", consisting of Amphibius, Barbarus, Brainchild, and Lupo.
- The Savage Land Mutates appear in the board game Legendary.
