= Phantazia =

- Phantazia as depicted in X-Men Unlimited #2 (September 1993). Art by Jan Duursema.

Publication information
- Publisher: Marvel Comics
- First appearance: X-Force #6 (January 1992)
- Created by: Fabian Nicieza (writer); Rob Liefeld (artist)

In-story information
- Alter ego: Eileen Harsaw
- Species: Human mutant
- Team affiliations: Brotherhood of Mutants
- Abilities: Wavelength manipulation

Phantazia (Eileen Harsaw) is a supervillain appearing in American comic books published by Marvel Comics. The character first appeared in X-Force #6 (1992).

== Fictional character biography ==
Phantazia is recruited by Toad into his lineup of the Brotherhood of Mutants. She is one of the more powerful members of the group, possessing a mutant ability that allows her to manipulate and disrupt not only the electronic systems and weaponry of her opponents, but their physical senses and superhuman powers as well. Her first mission with the Brotherhood leads her to battle X-Force. She locates the team's hidden bunker, shuts off Cable's weaponry, and disrupts Cannonball's blast field, allowing Sauron to stab Cannonball in the chest.

Phantazia is invited to Avalon, a mutant sanctuary, by Exodus. She rejects the offer and stays with the Brotherhood. After battling the X-Men, Phantazia departs Avalon with her teammates.

Phantazia is next seen in the altered reality of the 2005 "House of M" storyline. After the timeline is restored, Phantazia is confirmed as one of the many mutants who lost their powers on M-Day. The reality alteration leaves her catatonic as she is taken into S.H.I.E.L.D. custody.

With her sanity and powers both regained, Phantazia is granted sanctuary at Madelyne Pryor's embassy in Manhattan.

== Powers and abilities ==
Phantazia is a mutant with the ability to sense, manipulate, and disrupt anything that has properties of a wave in her environment, allowing for a wide range of effects.

When her power is used on electronic systems and computerized weapons, Phantazia can short them out completely or interact with them, controlling their functions to a limited degree. She can disrupt or interact with the bioelectric fields of living beings in a similar manner, causing pain and paralysis and a loss of muscle control and coordination. When directed on a superpowered human, Phantazia's disruptive ability can cause their powers to fluctuate, resulting in a loss of control or total power dampening. She can generate a masking effect with her power, rendering herself and others undetectable to electronic surveillance systems and the physical senses of others, and levitate.
