= Lorelei (Mutate) =

Publication information
- Publisher: Marvel Comics
- First appearance: The X-Men #63 (December 1969)
- Created by: Roy Thomas (writer); Neal Adams (artist)

In-story information
- Alter ego: Lani Ubana
- Species: Savage Land Mutate
- Team affiliations: Brotherhood of Mutants; Savage Land Mutates
- Abilities: Hypnosis

Lorelei (Lani Ubana) is a fictional character appearing in American comic books published by Marvel Comics.

== Publication history ==
The character's first appearance was in The X-Men #63 (December 1969), and was created by Roy Thomas and Neal Adams.

The character subsequently appears in The Avengers #105 (Nov. 1972), The Defenders #15-16 (Sept.–Oct. 1974), Uncanny X-Men #104 (April 1977), Champions #17 (Jan. 1978), Super-Villain Team-Up #14 (Oct. 1977), Marvel Fanfare #1-4 (March–Sept. 1982), Captain America #415-417 (May–July 1993), X-Men: The Hidden Years #4 (March 2000), Cable & Deadpool #49 (March 2008), and Marvel Comics Presents #6-7 (April–May 2008).

Lorelei appeared as part of the "Savage Land Mutates" entry in The Official Handbook of the Marvel Universe Deluxe Edition #11.

== Fictional character biography ==
Lorelei is a Savage Land native until Magneto turns her into a mutated siren, whose voice can put men into a hypnotic trance, and she is placed in his Savage Land Mutates group. However, the machine that Magneto had used to empower his Savage Land creations is eventually destroyed. As a result, Lorelei loses her siren powers. Some time later, Lorelei is seen with her powers restored and joins the Brotherhood of Mutants.

Lorelei manipulates Ka-Zar into battling Deadpool as part of a mission to expand the dominion of the Savage Land. She uses many of the Land's inhabitants. Deadpool shoots her prehistoric ride and leaves her falling towards a group of dinosaurs. She survives this incident.

== Powers and abilities ==
Lorelei can hypnotically paralyze men by singing, or manipulate them and place them under her control.

== Other versions ==
Lorelei controlling Thor, telling him to kill Valkyrie in The Ultimates 3. Art by Joe Madureira

An alternate universe version of Lorelei appears in the Ultimate Marvel universe as a member of the Brotherhood of Mutants. In her first appearance, she hypnotizes Thor into attacking Valkyrie. Lorelei later passes herself off as the mother of Multiple Man. Both are killed by Wolverine during the events of "Ultimatum".
