= Sauron (Marvel Comics) =

Marvel Comics fictional character

Dr. Karl Lykos Sauron
- Sauron as depicted in The New Mutants (vol. 3) #10 (April 2010). Art by Paul Davidson.

Publication information
- Publisher: Marvel Comics
- First appearance: As Karl Lykos: The X-Men #59 (August 1969); As Sauron: The X-Men #60 (September 1969)
- Created by: Roy Thomas (writer); Neal Adams (artist)

In-story information
- Alter ego: Dr. Karl Lykos
- Species: Human mutate
- Team affiliations: Brotherhood of Mutants; Savage Land Mutates; Weapon X X-Men Green
- Abilities: Superhuman strength, speed, stamina, durability and intelligence; Flight; Hypnotic eyes; Razor-sharp claws; Fire-breath; Ability to absorb life forces and mutant powers, and sense mutants

Sauron (/ˈsɔːrɒn/) is a supervillain appearing in American comic books published by Marvel Comics. The character was created by writer Roy Thomas and artist Neal Adams, and made his first appearance in The X-Men #59 (August 1969).

Sauron is the alter ego of physician Dr. Karl Lykos. After being bitten by mutant pterodactyls, Lykos was transformed into an energy vampire, able to absorb the life force of others through touch. If Lykos absorbs the life force of mutants, he transforms into a humanoid Pteranodon, gaining increased strength and speed in the process. However, this also causes Sauron to gain control over Lykos. Throughout his history, Sauron has often been depicted as inhabiting the hidden prehistoric jungle of the Savage Land and as an enemy of the X-Men.

Outside of comics, the character has appeared in animated series, video games, merchandise and has been referenced in film. In the animated series X-Men and Hulk and the Agents of S.M.A.S.H., Karl Lykos / Sauron was voiced by Robert Bockstael and Steve Blum, respectively, and by John Kassir in the action role-playing game video game X-Men Legends II: Rise of Apocalypse.

== Creation and conception ==
The character was created by writer Roy Thomas and artist Neal Adams, though the two differ in their accounts of which of them was responsible for specific aspects of the character. He first fully appeared as Sauron in X-Men #60 (September 1969).

Thomas and Adams originally envisioned Sauron as a bat-like creature. However, when they consulted with the Comics Code Authority, they were told that Sauron's depiction as an energy vampire with a bat body risked violating the Code's ban on the use of vampires. To get around this problem, Thomas and Adams tweaked his appearance to that of the most bat-like animal they could think of—a pterodactyl—which in turn led them to have Sauron inhabit the hidden prehistoric jungle of the Savage Land.

== Fictional character biography ==
=== Early life ===
Karl Lykos was the son of an explorer's guide. As a teenager, he accompanied his father to Tierra del Fuego as the elder Lykos guided a wealthy client named Mr. Anderssen and Anderssen's young daughter, Tanya. While defending Tanya from mutant pterodactyls, Karl was bitten by one of the creatures. During his recovery, he discovered that he could now drain the life-force of other organisms. He found himself repeatedly tempted to use his new power, feeling that he needed to drain life energy from other humans or animals to survive.

When Karl's father died, Mr. Anderssen took Karl into his home in thanks for rescuing Tanya. As the years passed, Karl and Tanya fell in love, but Tanya's wealthy father would not allow her to date Karl because of his lack of wealth. In an effort to win Mr. Anderssen's support, Karl went to medical school and became a physician, geneticist, and hypnotherapist. He treated patients through hypnosis, but secretly robbed them of energy at the same time.

=== First transformation into Sauron and life in the Savage Land ===
Dr. Lykos becomes a colleague of Charles Xavier, and first encounters the X-Men when they seek treatment for Havok. After absorbing Havok's mutant energy, Lykos transforms into a vampiric, pterodactyl-like monster with human intelligence and superhuman hypnotic powers. He names himself Sauron, after J.R.R. Tolkien's villain (also reminiscent of the word saurus, Latin for lizard), and battles the X-Men, as a would-be conqueror. When he realizes that his transformation would threaten Tanya, Lykos flees to Tierra del Fuego, where he reverts to his human form after running out of energy. When Tanya tracks him down, Lykos throws himself off a cliff to avoid harming her.

Karl is presumed dead, but survived after landing on a ledge below the cliff. He journeys to the Savage Land and survived in human form by only draining less developed animals. He befriends Ka-Zar and uses his medical skills over many months to care for Ka-Zar's allies. When several X-Men are stranded in the Savage Land, Lykos is overwhelmed with the desire to absorb mutant energy. He transforms into Sauron once again after absorbing Storm's energy. He reverts to human form during a battle with the X-Men, and Ka-Zar explains that Lykos was an ally.

After learning that Lykos survived, Tanya joins Angel and Peter Parker on a journey to find Lykos in the Savage Land. They found Lykos, but they are mutated into animalistic forms by a machine created by the Savage Land Mutates. The destruction of the machine forces Lykos to drain energy from the three in an attempt to restore their true forms. This is successful, but results in Lykos becoming Sauron again. After the X-Men capture Lykos, Professor X seemingly cures him of his condition. Lykos and Tanya decide to resume their relationship and a normal life.

=== Second transformation into Sauron ===
Lykos is again transformed into Sauron when Toad uses a device of his own design to force Lykos to drain the life energy of Tanya, killing her in the process. Sauron then joins the Toad's Brotherhood of Mutants, despite not being a mutant. Alongside them, he battles X-Force, and injures Cannonball. Sauron is apparently shot dead by Cable, and his body is given to the Morlocks. Sauron is later revealed to have survived.

Sauron is imprisoned by the Weapon X program jumpstarted by director Malcolm Colcord. He starts a revolution with fellow agent Brent Jackson and dethrones Colcord as director, giving the position to Jackson. Sometime later, Sauron escapes from the Raft, where he had been imprisoned after refusing to participate in any more Weapon X assignments. Sauron is shot in the head by Yelena Belova, but survives due to having absorbed Wolverine's healing factor.

Amphibius tells Sauron and the other Savage Land Mutates that Magneto's Asteroid M has risen from the sea. When the other Mutates refuse to go to Asteroid M, Worm takes control of Sauron, Barbarus, and Lupo and commandeers a ship to find Magneto. After being threatened by the Japanese military, Sauron attacks an armored car, causing an international incident. Cannonball stops Sauron while the other New Mutants defeat the Savage Land Mutates.

Sauron later collaborates with Stegron in a plan to turn humanity into dinosaurs, battling Spider-Man and the mutant students from the Jean Grey School for Higher Learning. The duo's plans are unraveled by their own infighting, purposely exacerbated by their shared attraction to Shark-Girl who caused their powers to neutralize each other.

Lykos returns to working in a military laboratory to enhance his powers, until one of his colleagues is contacted by the Scarlet Spider. Now able to store mutant energy to trigger his transformations at will, Lykos turns into Sauron and attacks the vigilante, but although he wounds the man the Spider came to the base to collect, Sauron is defeated and webbed up to be taken away.

Sauron later joins X-Men Green, an eco-terrorist group founded by Nature Girl.

== Powers and abilities ==
In human form, Karl Lykos is a normal human, although an accomplished medical doctor, geneticist, and psychotherapist. He employs hypnotism in his practice. He possesses an M.D. and Ph.D. in genetics and psychology.

After being infected with a genetic virus by mutant Pteranodons, Lykos gained the ability to absorb the life forces of other beings, enabling him to transform into a Pteranodon hybrid and replicate superpowers. In Spider-Man and the X-Men, Sauron demonstrated the ability to transfer his life-absorption power to others via bite. By the time he confronts the Scarlet Spider, Lykos has developed his powers to the point where he can store mutant energy to transform on his own.

Sauron additionally possesses fire breath, hypnosis via eye contact, and the ability to expel concussive energy bursts from his hands.

== Other versions ==
=== Age of Apocalypse ===
Soaron, a heroic alternate universe version of Sauron from Earth-295, appears in Age of Apocalypse. This version is a member of Forge's Outcasts before being killed by Magneto.

=== House of M ===
An alternate universe version of Sauron from Earth-58163 appears in House of M. This version is a guard at Magneto's palace on Genosha.

=== Power Pack (Marvel Adventures) ===
Sauron appears in Wolverine and Power Pack.

== In other media ==
=== Television ===
- Sauron appears in the X-Men: The Animated Series two-part episode "Savage Land, Savage Heart", voiced by Robert Bockstael. This version was transformed after being subjected to Mister Sinister's experiments. Sauron aids Sinister in his efforts to destroy the X-Men and later attempts to conquer the Savage Land for himself, but is defeated and returned to his human form. With no mutants remaining in the Savage Land to trigger his transformations, Lykos is left to live in peace and joins Ka-Zar's tribe.
- Sauron makes a cameo appearance in Wolverine and the X-Men in the episode "Greetings from Genosha" as a prisoner on Genosha.
- Sauron appears in Hulk and the Agents of S.M.A.S.H., voiced by Steve Blum.
  - Additionally, two alternate timeline versions of Sauron, King Sauron and a version who was fused with a Frost Giant, appear in the five-part episode "Days of Future Smash".

=== Video games ===
- Sauron makes a cameo appearance in X-Men.
- Sauron makes a cameo appearance in X-Men: Next Dimension via the Savage Land stage.
- Sauron appears as a boss in X-Men Legends II: Rise of Apocalypse, voiced by John Kassir.
- An Ultimate Marvel-inspired incarnation of Sauron makes a cameo appearance in Ultimate Spider-Man.
- Sauron appears as a boss in Marvel Heroes, voiced by Steve Blum.
- Sauron appears as a boss in Marvel: Avengers Alliance.
- Sauron appears as a playable character in Marvel Contest of Champions.
- Sauron appears in Marvel Snap.
- Sauron appears in Marvel Cosmic Invasion, voiced by Trevor Devall.
- Sauron makes a cameo appearance in Marvel Tokon: Fighting Souls in the Savage Land stage.

== Reception ==
Sauron was ranked #17 on a listing of Marvel Comics' monster characters in 2015.

Comic Book Resources (CBR) named him as the 8th top X-Men villain they would like to see in the Marvel Cinematic Universe.

In 2020, CBR ranked Sauron 7th in their "Marvel: Dark Spider-Man Villains, Ranked From Lamest To Coolest" list.
