= Robert Kelly (character) =

Robert Edward Kelly

Publication information
- Publisher: Marvel Comics
- First appearance: Uncanny X-Men #135 (July 1980)
- Created by: Chris Claremont (writer); John Byrne (artist)

In-story information
- Alter ego: Robert Edward Kelly
- Species: Human
- Team affiliations: United States Senate; Project Wideawake
- Abilities: Charisma; Military training

Robert Edward Kelly is a character appearing in American comic books published by Marvel Comics, often in association with the X-Men. He is a prominent United States Senator who began his career on an anti-mutant platform and tended to be an antagonist to the X-Men team, but later began to change his views on mutants as a whole.

== Publication history ==
The character was created by Chris Claremont and John Byrne and makes his first appearance in The Uncanny X-Men #135 (July 1980). Claremont named the character after his Bard College professor, poet Robert Kelly.

== Fictional character biography ==
Senator Robert Kelly is first seen at a social gathering hosted by the Hellfire Club, where an illusion projected by the mutant villain Mastermind causes Kelly to believe that X-Men member Cyclops is firing randomly into a crowd. Kelly is the primary backer of the Mutant Control Act and Project Wideawake, a government program aimed at creating updated Sentinel robots that will track down, detain, and kill violent mutants if necessary.

Kelly played a central role in the Days of Future Past storyline. In a possible future, his assassination by Mystique and the Brotherhood of Mutants leads to a dystopian setting where mutants and other heroes are hunted down by the Sentinels and nearly totally eliminated. This timeline's Kitty Pryde transfers her consciousness into her past self and works with the X-Men to save Kelly's life.

Kelly is married to Sharon, a former maid who worked in the Hellfire Club. Sharon is killed by Master Mold during a battle with Rogue, which further incites Kelly's stance against mutants.

Kelly remains an active anti-mutant activist, but slowly becomes more tolerant towards mutants, promising the X-Men he will support mutant rights. Kelly's changed views are reinforced when Pyro saves him during an attack from Post. Not long afterward, Kelly is assassinated at a rally by anti-mutant activist Alan Lewis, who believes that Kelly had betrayed his cause. Cable had been too occupied helping Jean Grey save Charles Xavier on the astral plane to realize the danger to Kelly before it was too late. Cable's failure to protect Kelly, coupled with the death of Moira MacTaggert, causes Cable to leave the X-Men.

== Other versions ==
=== Age of Apocalypse ===
An alternate universe version of Robert Kelly appears in Age of Apocalypse. This version is an activist for mutant-human peace who is eventually elected President of the United States.

=== Secret Wars ===
An alternate universe version of Robert Kelly appears in "Secret Wars". This version is the Baron of the Battleworld domain of Westchester and a member of the Horsemen of Apocalypse.

=== X-Men: Noir ===
An alternate universe version of Robert Kelly appears in X-Men Noir. This version is a Republican senator from New York who defends the extraterritorial prison Genosha Bay, intending for the prison to launch a new generation of soldiers and government operatives.

== In other media ==
=== Television ===
Robert Kelly as he appears in X-Men: The Animated Series (left), X-Men: Evolution (center) and Wolverine and the X-Men (right)
- Robert Jefferson Kelly appears in X-Men: The Animated Series, voiced by Len Carlson. This version initially runs for President of the United States on an anti-mutant campaign until he gradually changes his mind following failed assassination attempts by Mystique disguised as Gambit and kidnapped by Master Mold before being rescued by the X-Men. Upon winning the election and taking office, Kelly publicly supports mutants and pardons Beast as his first presidential act.
  - Robert Kelly appears in X-Men '97, voiced by Ron Rubin.
- A character based on Robert Kelly named Edward Kelly appears in X-Men: Evolution, voiced by Dale Wilson. This version is the principal of Bayville High, which several X-Men and the Brotherhood of Bayville attend. After the X-Men's identities are publicly revealed, Kelly attempts to vote them out of school, but the school board votes against him after the X-Men save them from the Brotherhood.
- Senator Robert Kelly appears in Wolverine and the X-Men, voiced by Richard Doyle. This version arranged for Magneto to receive Genosha. After Magneto closes Genosha's borders, Kelly sends Gambit to steal Magneto's helmet and cripple Genosha. Magneto attempts to seek revenge, but Professor X intervenes by showing Magneto and Kelly the possible dystopian future that will take place if they continue on their current path. Shocked by this, Kelly shuts down Sentinel production. However, Magneto has Quicksilver capture Kelly so Mystique can take his place and help incite a war between mutants and humanity.
- Senator Robert Kelly appears in the Iron Man: Armored Adventures episode "The X-Factor", voiced again by Dale Wilson.

=== Film ===
- Senator Robert Kelly appears in X-Men (2000), portrayed by Bruce Davison. This version is a Republican from Kansas who advocates for a Mutant Registration Act. After being kidnapped by the Brotherhood of Mutants and used as a test subject for Magneto's plan to convert humans into mutants, Kelly is transformed into a jellyfish-like mutant with stretching capabilities. However, the process proves fatal due to his body rejecting the changes. The X-Men later recover Kelly and learn of Magneto's machine before he dies.
- Senator Robert Kelly appears in X2, portrayed again by Bruce Davison. Following Kelly's death, Mystique takes his place to avoid arousing suspicions.

=== Video games ===
- Senator Robert Kelly appears in Marvel: Ultimate Alliance, voiced by Peter Renaday. This version harbors a general distrust of superhumans in addition to mutants. After being captured by Arcade and imprisoned in Murderworld, players have the option of saving Kelly. If he is found and rescued, Kelly will support a mutant aid bill, which will allow government funding for schools dedicated to training young mutants in how to control their powers. If not, he frees himself and successfully sponsors a bill where all mutants are sent to re-education camps, where they are brutally educated in not using their powers.
- Senator Robert Kelly appears in X-Men Origins: Wolverine, voiced by Steve Blum.
