= Brotherhood of Mutants =

Marvel Comics fictional team

- Cover art for X-Men: Legacy #209 by David Finch

Publication information
- Publisher: Marvel Comics
- First appearance: X-Men #4 (March 1964)
- Created by: Stan Lee (writer); Jack Kirby (artist)

In-story information
- Base(s): Various
- Leader(s): Magneto

Roster

The Brotherhood of Mutants (originally known as the Brotherhood of Evil Mutants) is a fictional group of mutants appearing in American comic books published by Marvel Comics. The Brotherhood are among the chief adversaries of the X-Men. While the group's roster and ideology have varied from incarnation to incarnation, most versions of the Brotherhood are generally founded and led by the mutant Magneto as a supervillain team or mutant supremacy organization that uses extreme methods to fight human prejudice.

Unlike the X-Men, who believe that humans and mutants can coexist peacefully, the Brotherhood's members generally view humanity as an inferior, close-minded species that will never accept mutants out of fear of their powers. Among the mutants who are frequently depicted as members of the Brotherhood are Mystique, Sabretooth, Toad, Blob, Pyro, Mastermind, Avalanche, Quicksilver, and Scarlet Witch.

The original Brotherhood of Mutants was depicted as Magneto's primary allies in his early battles with the X-Men in comics published in the 1960s. This Brotherhood was ultimately disbanded, with Quicksilver and Scarlet Witch going on to become members of the Avengers. In 1981, the Brotherhood of Mutants was revived under the leadership of Mystique, while the group's most visible incarnation during the early 1990s was led by Toad.

Outside of comics, the Brotherhood of Mutants has appeared in several animated series and video games featuring the X-Men, as well as the X-Men film series.

== Publication history ==
The original Brotherhood of Mutants was created by writer Stan Lee and artist/co-writer Jack Kirby and first appeared in X-Men #4 (March 1964).

== Ideology ==
While later incarnations of the Brotherhood promoted the group's existence as a political and ideological rival to Professor Charles Xavier's dream of peace with humans, the group was originally conceived as simply a small, but powerful army of minions gathered by Magneto to aid in his schemes for world domination. But since the group's second incarnation, the group has become a much more politically motivated group designed for use of violence to provide justice and lead a 'mutant revolution' against mankind.

One of the greater ironies of the group has been its use of "Evil" in its name. When his decision to name the group was brought up in an interview, Stan Lee simply said "We were kind of corny in those days." Since the early 1990s, writers have attempted to explain this away by having Toad describe it as irony, based upon the perceived notion that all mutants are "evil." Later writers have opted instead to simply drop "Evil" from the group's name and refer to the group as "The Brotherhood of Mutants" or simply the Brotherhood. In the alternate continuity of Earth X, Uatu explains that Magneto chose the name so that, as the opposing side, Professor X would be forced to assume the role of "Good," and that Magneto believed that by locking Professor X into absolutes of morality, he could manipulate him.

Many of the group's members have been shown to be past victims of anti-mutant prejudice, which has made the group a haven for many mutants who feel they are outcasts and pariahs. While many of these outcast mutants have willingly embraced the violent aspects of the Brotherhood's ideology, several have ultimately rejected it and left the group because of it. Most notably, Quicksilver and Scarlet Witch left the group due to their disillusionment with Magneto's ideology to join the Avengers, a group of heroes dedicated to protecting the world as opposed to ruling it.

== Fictional team history ==
=== Magneto's Brotherhood ===
The original leader of the team was Magneto, a mutant with the ability to control magnetic fields. It would later be revealed that Magneto was a survivor of the Holocaust, which left him distrusting of humanity. The other members of the original team were Quicksilver, who can move and think at superhuman speeds; his twin sister, the Scarlet Witch, who has the power to affect probability; Toad, a sniveling villain with incredible jumping abilities; and Mastermind, who can create illusions affecting all senses. Quicksilver and Scarlet Witch had joined after Magneto saved Scarlet Witch from a mob who believed she was a witch after she accidentally made a house burst into flame. She joined to repay the debt, and Quicksilver joined to keep her safe.

Magneto and Toad are captured by the Stranger, who they initially believe to be a mutant before learning that he is an alien. Mastermind is turned to a block of solid matter by the Stranger. Quicksilver and Scarlet Witch leave the team and later join the Avengers. After returning to Earth, Magneto reorganizes the team three times, including such mutants as Blob and Unus the Untouchable, as well as Lorelei, and creating a team that is alternately called Mutant Force and the Resistants.

After Magneto abandons the Brotherhood, the remaining members work with Vanisher as part of a plot to get revenge on the X-Men, but are beaten by the Champions. After this defeat, the Brotherhood is disbanded and its remaining members are imprisoned.

=== Mystique's Brotherhood ===
Mystique organizes her own Brotherhood of Mutants with Pyro, Blob, Avalanche, Destiny, and Rogue. The Brotherhood's members (minus Rogue, who defects to the X-Men) later join the government-sponsored team Freedom Force. As Freedom Force, their membership briefly includes Spiral and Spider-Woman, and later includes Super Sabre, Crimson Commando, and Stonewall. The Brotherhood disbands after Destiny, Super Sabre, and Stonewall are killed in action, Mystique fakes her death, Crimson Commando is crippled, and Blob and Pyro are abandoned on a mission in Iraq.

=== Toad's Brotherhood ===
Toad also organizes a Brotherhood of Mutants of his own at one point, including Blob and Pyro; Phantazia, a mutant who can disrupt electronics and superhuman powers; and Sauron. Toad's Brotherhood is concerned mostly with hatching revenge schemes against the X-teams, but has also fought X-Force, X-Factor, Darkhawk, Spider-Man, and Sleepwalker.

=== Havok's Brotherhood ===
After being captured and subjected to intensive brainwashing by Dark Beast, Havok forms a short-lived Brotherhood of Mutants with Dark Beast, Fatale, Aurora, Random, Ever, and X-Man. incarnation was the first Brotherhood to omit the "Evil" from its name. It is later revealed that Havok formed the team as part of a sting operation to uncover Dark Beast's experimentation; the group falls apart as a result.

=== Professor X's Brotherhood ===
The following incarnation includes new members Mimic and Post as well as Blob and Toad. They free Charles Xavier from prison and helped the X-Men against the animated Cerebro, who had created a team of fake X-Men. They later cooperate with Mystique in an attempt to capture Machine Man. The team disbands shortly afterwards.

During this time period, it was revealed that Astra was a member of the original Brotherhood, providing Magneto with the technology used to create Asteroid M and locating potential recruits, including Nightcrawler. Though she was in love with Magneto, he did not love her. This rejection led to her quitting the team and served as the motivation behind her creation of Joseph, a clone of Magneto.

=== Mystique's Second Brotherhood ===
During the threat of the Legacy Virus, Mystique organizes another Brotherhood, drawing members from nearly every incarnation like Avalanche, Blob, Toad, and Post and adding Sabretooth and Martinique Jason to the lineup. A training session also showed a new Super Sabre and Crimson Commando, but they were not included on the mission. This Brotherhood attempts to kill Robert Kelly, but are thwarted by Pyro, who dies shortly afterward from the Legacy Virus.

=== The Brotherhood ===
The series The Brotherhood features a large group of mutant terrorists, unrelated to the Brotherhood. The group was founded by the mutants Hoffman, Orwell and Marshal, but Marshal leaves the group and becomes a government agent. Hoffman hides his identity under the alias "X". Marshal is ordered to take down the Brotherhood, but actually intends to kill Hoffman and become the new "X". This series is cancelled after nine issues, at which point all members had either been killed in the power struggle between Hoffman and Marshal or by X-Force (later renamed X-Statix).

=== Mystique's Third Brotherhood ===
The next incarnation of the Brotherhood is led by Mystique again and includes Avalanche, Blob, Mastermind, and new member Fever Pitch. This Brotherhood had infiltrated the X-Corps and took over the group, before it is defeated by the X-Men and Mystique is sucked into another dimension by Abyss. Following her being rescued from her former lover's realm, Mystique becomes a reluctant agent of Professor X, doing black ops missions for him.

=== Xorn's Brotherhood ===
Another Brotherhood is formed by former X-Man Xorn, who had been posing as Magneto. His Brotherhood consists of his former students Beak, Angel Salvadore, Martha Johansson, Basilisk, Ernst, Esme Cuckoo, and Toad. Most of the members rebel against Xorn after he accidentally kills Basilisk and his insanity becomes too obvious to ignore.

=== Exodus' Brotherhood ===
In the "Heroes and Villains" arc that concluded Chuck Austen's run on X-Men, a new version of the Brotherhood is introduced. The team was led by Exodus, who had once been Magneto's herald, and includes Avalanche, Sabretooth (who had simply been hired by Exodus), and new members Black Tom Cassidy, Mammomax, Nocturne (who was revealed to be spying on the team), and Juggernaut (who was later revealed to be a mole). After Black Tom kills Juggernaut's friend Squid-Boy, Juggernaut lashes out and tries to destroy the Brotherhood. After knocking Juggernaut and several other Brotherhood members unconscious, Exodus leads his team to the Xavier Institute to take revenge for the apparent death of Magneto, with the Institute's cook Marilyn Hannah being killed in the attack. The entire team is defeated by Xorn, who sucks them into the "black hole" within his head. The Brotherhood sells Nocturne and Juggernaut to Mojo to escape.

=== Sunspot's Brotherhood ===
In Young X-Men, Donald Pierce, in disguise as Cyclops, deceives several X-Men in training into attacking what he dubs a new incarnation of the Brotherhood, which consists of Cannonball, Danielle Moonstar and Magma, all under the leadership of Sunspot. However, this was just a manipulative ruse, and these four New Mutants were neither a team at the time nor conducting villainous activity.

=== Red Queen's Sisterhood ===
An all-female incarnation called the Sisterhood is formed by the "Red Queen"—revealed to be Madelyne Pryor—who recruited Martinique Jason, Lady Mastermind, Chimera, Spiral, and Lady Deathstrike. The Sisterhood captures and brainwashes Psylocke, making her a member as well. The Red Queen is lured into a trap set by Cyclops and defeated. Psylocke breaks free from her brainwashing and rejoins the X-Men, while the other Sisterhood members escape.

=== Joseph's Brotherhood ===
In the miniseries "Magneto: Not a Hero", Joseph is resurrected under unknown circumstances and forms a new Brotherhood of Mutants with Astra and deformed clones of Blob, Mastermind, Quicksilver, Scarlet Witch, and Toad. All the clones are later killed by Magneto. Joseph is defeated by Magneto and remanded to Utopia's X-Brig.

=== Daken's Brotherhood ===
In Uncanny X-Force, Daken forms a new Brotherhood of Mutants with Mystique, Sabretooth, Shadow King, Blob of the "Age of Apocalypse" universe, Skinless Man, and the Omega Clan, with the apparent goal of exacting revenge on X-Force. The group was seen recruiting Genesis as their next member, in order to turn him into the new Apocalypse.

=== Mystique's Fourth Brotherhood ===
With the money the Brotherhood of Mutants robbed in the heists, Mystique acquires Madripoor from Hydra and attempted to turn it into a mutant sanctuary. Posing as Dazzler, Mystique attracts Magneto to the island and shows him her plans. However, Magneto reacts violently to the plan, believing that Mystique and the others are traitors to their species in part due to allowing the use of Mutant Growth Hormone to run rampant in the streets to fund their operations. He injures Mystique and the Brotherhood and leaves after making their base collapse.

=== Lady Deathstrike's Sisterhood ===
Lady Deathstrike recruits Typhoid Mary, Enchantress, and Selene and assembles a new Sisterhood to take down the X-Men, as well as helping each one of them to achieve their individual goals. After Lady Deathstrike's host, Ana Cortes, has a change of heart about being a supervillain and serving Arkea, she contacts the X-Men and informs them of the Sisterhood's location before killing herself. Arkea transfers Lady Deathstrike's consciousness in the same body Arkea used for a host, Reiko. The X-Men assault the Sisterhood's hideout, with Karima Shapandar killing Arkea.

=== Mesmero's Brotherhood ===
A new brotherhood are led by Mesmero and secretly funded by anti-mutant activist Lydia Nance.

Mesmero escapes prison and persuades Pyro and Avalanche to help him get revenge on Lydia Nance. After the fight with the X-Men and the NYPD, the Brotherhood of Mutants retreat to their hideout, where Mesmero reveals that they are still under Nance's paycheck. Pyro abandons Nance, no longer wanting to work with her.

=== Magneto's Second Brotherhood ===
Magneto is captured and made into one of Nate Grey's Horsemen of Salvation.

=== Joseph's Second Brotherhood ===
Taking the opportunity of Magneto's disappearance, Joseph disguises himself as Magneto and appears to disband the former Brotherhood, only to sway Avalanche, Juggernaut, Pyro, Random, and Toad to form a new Brotherhood in the wake of the death of the X-Men. The Brotherhood went to an Air Force base in Transia to put the fear in humans, but were confronted by a new group of X-Men led by a resurrected Cyclops. After the battle, Joseph's identity is revealed as the real Master of Magnetism was actually kidnapped by Nate Grey and mind-controlled to become one of his Horsemen of Salvation.

== Other versions ==
=== Age of Apocalypse ===
An alternate universe iteration of the Brotherhood of Mutants called the Brotherhood of Chaos appears in Age of Apocalypse, consisting of Copycat, Box, Spyne, Yeti, and Arclight. This version is a mutant strike force working for Apocalypse.

=== Amazing Spider-Man: Renew Your Vows ===
An alternate universe iteration of the Brotherhood of Mutants appears in The Amazing Spider-Man: Renew Your Vows, consisting of Magneto, Blob, Toad, Mist Mistress, Jubilee, Emma Frost, and an unnamed mutant resembling Crucible.

=== Battle of the Atom ===
A future version of the Brotherhood of Mutants appears in the Battle of the Atom storyline, consisting of Xorn (Jean Grey), Charles Xavier II (the alleged son of Professor X and Mystique), Beast, Ice Thing (a semi-sentient ice construct created by Iceman), Molly Hayes, Deadpool, and Raze Logan (the son of Wolverine and Mystique). After Xorn is killed, it is revealed that all of the Brotherhood's other members - except for Raze Logan - were only working with the team due to Xavier's telepathic influence. With Xavier and Raze both subdued, the Brotherhood's members are returned to their home time period, while Xavier and Logan are left in the present and imprisoned.

=== Marvel 1602 ===
An alternate universe iteration of the Brotherhood of Mutants called the Brotherhood of Those Who Will Inherit The Earth appears in Marvel 1602. This version was founded by Enrique, the Grand Inquisitor of the Spanish Inquisition, with his children Petros and Wanda serving under him as messenger and assistant, respectively.

=== Marvel Noir ===
An alternate universe iteration of the Brotherhood of Mutants appears in Marvel Noir, led by Magnus and consisting of Fred Dukes, Mortimer Toynbee, and Jason Wyngarde. This version of the group are corrupt police officers working under Sebastian Shaw.

=== MC2 ===
A group based on the Brotherhood of Mutants called the Sisterhood of Mutants appears in Amazing Spider-Girl #22, consisting of Magneta, Impact (a mutant who possesses superhuman strength and the ability to increase the size of any part of her body), Pirouette (who can rotate at high speeds), and Headcase (a powerful psychic).

=== House of M ===
An alternate universe iteration of the Brotherhood of Mutants appears in House of M. This version is an NYPD strikeforce team that was established to take down organized crime. The group is led by John Proudstar and initially consists of Frank Castle, Blob, Feral, Taskmaster, Avalanche, Boom Boom and Misty Knight. Castle later leaves the Brotherhood after seeing the other members mistreat criminals, while Knight is revealed to be a double agent and defects from the Brotherhood.

=== Ultimate Marvel ===
In Ultimate X-Men, the Brotherhood of Mutants is called the Brotherhood of Mutant Supremacy, headed by a far more violent and genocidal version of Magneto. It was originally formed by Professor X and Magneto in a plan to create a safe haven for mutants in a city within the Savage Land but was later turned into a pro-mutant extremist group after Magneto ousted Professor X from the Brotherhood over their conflicting views. The original Brotherhood consisted of Blob, Mastermind, Magneto's twins Quicksilver and Scarlet Witch, Toad, and Wolverine.

After Charles forms the X-Men to combat the Brotherhood, Wolverine is tasked by Magneto to infiltrate and spy on the X-Men but later defects after he comes to believe in the group's ideals of peaceful coexistence between humans and mutants. In the Ultimate War and "Return of the King" storylines, Quicksilver and Scarlet Witch defect to the Ultimates to help stop the resurfaced Magneto. Unus, Detonator, Juggernaut, Longshot, Hard-Drive, Rogue, Sabretooth, Vanisher, Forge, and Multiple Man join the Brotherhood.

In The Ultimates 3, Magneto leads Sabretooth, Blob, Unus, Multiple Man, Mystique, Pyro, Mastermind, and Lorelei in a fight against the Ultimates after Ultron kills Scarlet Witch. The battle results in Unus and Mastermind being killed.

Magneto, Blob, Detonator, Forge, Hard-Drive, Longshot, Lorelei, and Multiple Man are killed during the Ultimatum storyline. Quicksilver survives and goes on to reform the Brotherhood of Mutants with Mystique, Sabretooth, and Blob (Teddy Allan).

=== Weapon X: Days of Future Now ===
An alternate universe iteration of the Brotherhood of Mutants appears in Weapon X: Days of Future Now, led by Sabretooth and consisting of Avalanche, Blob, Caliban, Hub, Mimic, and Scalphunter.

=== X-Men: Fairy Tales ===
An alternate universe iteration of the Brotherhood of Mutants appears in Marvel Fairy Tales, consisting of Magneto, Quicksilver, Scarlet Witch, and Toad. This version of the group are Oni.

=== X-Men: No More Humans ===
Raze Logan assembles a Brotherhood of Mutants with mutants from various alternate universes: Pyro, Avalanche, Blob, Phantazia, Mastermind, Unus the Untouchable, Lorelei, Vanisher, Toad, Fatale, Peepers, Quicksilver, and Scarlet Witch. The X-Men eventually defeat Logan and his Brotherhood and send each of the members back to their home worlds.

== In other media ==
=== Television ===
- The Brotherhood of Evil Mutants appear in the Spider-Man and His Amazing Friends episode "The Prison Plot", consisting of Magneto, Toad, Blob, and Mastermind.
- The Brotherhood of Mutants, referred to as the "Brotherhood of Mutant Terrorists", appear in X-Men: Pryde of the X-Men, consisting of Magneto, Toad, Blob, Pyro, Juggernaut, and the White Queen.
- The Brotherhood of Evil Mutants appear in X-Men: The Animated Series, led by Mystique and consisting of Blob, Avalanche, and Pyro. This version of the group is initially financed by Apocalypse, though only Mystique knows of this.
- The Brotherhood of Mutants, referred to as the "Brotherhood of Bayville", appear in X-Men: Evolution, consisting of teenage versions of Avalanche, Toad, Blob, and Quicksilver, who are brought together by Mystique on Magneto's behalf. Additionally, Rogue and Boom-Boom appear as temporary members until the former defects to the X-Men and Mystique ousts the latter. In the second season, Magneto's daughter Scarlet Witch joins the group. Due to Mystique's shifting loyalties and Magneto's long periods of absence, the Brotherhood's male members are often left without guidance. As the series progresses, they slowly grow indifferent to being supervillains, to the point where they stay home whenever possible. In the episode "No Good Deed", Bayville's citizens begin to see the Brotherhood as heroes after they rescue people from a subway disaster, though the male members attempt to capitalize on the rewards they received for their deeds. Towards the end of the series, they become an unpredictable third party in the battle between the X-Men and Magneto's Acolytes, often joining forces with the former despite being rivals. In the two-part series finale "Ascension", Scarlet Witch defects to the X-Men. While on a mission with them, the other Brotherhood members come to her rescue and defeat an Apocalypse-controlled Magneto. In a flash-forward, the Brotherhood, Scarlet Witch, and Pyro of the Acolytes go on to join S.H.I.E.L.D.
- The Brotherhood of Mutants appear in Wolverine and the X-Men, led by Quicksilver and consisting of Avalanche, Blob, Domino, Toad, and Rogue, the last of whom is secretly working undercover as a double agent for the X-Men. This version of the group performs missions for Magneto and Genosha. In the episode "Time Bomb", the Brotherhood are briefly joined by Psylocke, who was enlisted to control Nitro's powers.

=== Film ===
The Brotherhood appears in the X-Men film franchise.

- First appearing in X-Men (2000), the group initially consists of Magneto, Mystique, Toad, and Sabretooth. They invent a machine that can trigger mutations in human beings for Magneto's plot to replace the human race with mutants. However, their plans are foiled by the X-Men after the latter discovers that the machine destroys the subject's DNA, with Toad being killed and Sabretooth being presumed dead in the ensuing fight.
- In X2 (2003), Magneto and Mystique are joined by former Xavier Institute student Pyro.
- In X-Men: The Last Stand (2006), the Brotherhood recruits a legion of mutants into its ranks, including the Phoenix, mutant prisoners Juggernaut and Multiple Man, and the Omegas - Quill, Callisto, Arclight, Psylocke, Spike, Glob Herman, and Phat. Together, they oppose the creation of a "mutant cure", though many of them are either subjected to it or fall in battle against various enemies.
- In X-Men: First Class (2011), in the aftermath of the Cuban Missile Crisis, Magneto parts ways from the X-Men and recruits Mystique and former Hellfire Club members Riptide, Azazel, Angel Salvadore, and Emma Frost.
- In Dark Phoenix (2019), Magneto forms the Brotherhood in the 1990s to avenge Mystique's death, recruiting Beast, Selene Gallio and Ariki. The Brotherhood hunts Mystique's killer Jean Grey, though they and the X-Men are captured by the U.S. government. While en route to a containment facility, the D'Bari attack and Gallio and Ariki are killed in the ensuing battle.

=== Video games ===
- The Brotherhood appear in X-Men: Mutant Academy, consisting of Magneto, Mystique, Toad, and Sabretooth.
- The Brotherhood appear in X-Men: Mutant Academy 2, consisting of the same members as the previous installment, with the addition of Juggernaut.
- The Brotherhood appear in X-Men: Next Dimension, consisting of Magneto, Mystique, Toad, Sabretooth, Juggernaut, Blob, and Lady Deathstrike.
- The Brotherhood of Mutants appear in the X-Men Legends games, initially consisting of Magneto, Mystique, Toad, Blob, Pyro, Avalanche, Sabretooth, and Havok along with a substantial number of unnamed Brotherhood grunts.
  - In the first game, the Brotherhood is based on Asteroid M and initially led by Mystique until Magneto is rescued from jail. His plan to blockade the Earth with asteroids is thwarted by the X-Men, though the Brotherhood escape while Havok defects to the X-Men.
  - In X-Men Legends II: Rise of Apocalypse, the Brotherhood have relocated to Genosha and added Juggernaut, Scarlet Witch, and Quicksilver to their ranks.
- The Brotherhood of Mutants appear in X-Men: Destiny, consisting of Magneto, Mystique, Juggernaut, Pyro, Quicksilver, and Toad.
- The Brotherhood of Mutants appear in Marvel: Avengers Alliance, consisting of Magneto, Avalanche, Blob, Juggernaut, Mystique, Sabretooth, and Toad along with artificial mutants and modified Sentinels.
- The Brotherhood of Mutants appear in Lego Marvel Super Heroes, consisting of Magneto, Mystique, Sabretooth, Toad, Pyro, Blob, Mastermind, and Juggernaut.
- The Brotherhood of Mutants appear in Marvel Strike Force, consisting of Magneto, Mystique, Sabretooth, Pyro, and Juggernaut.
- The Brotherhood of Mutants appear in Marvel Ultimate Alliance 3: The Black Order, consisting of Magneto, Juggernaut, and Mystique.
