= Toad (Marvel Comics) =

Fictional character appearing in American comic books published by Marvel Comics

Mortimer Toynbee Toad
- Toad as he appeared on the cover of X-Force #5 (December 1991). Art by Rob Liefeld.

Publication information
- Publisher: Marvel Comics
- First appearance: The X-Men #4 (March 1964)
- Created by: Stan Lee; Jack Kirby

In-story information
- Full name: Mortimer Toynbee
- Species: Human mutant
- Team affiliations: Brotherhood of Mutants; The 198; Defenders; The Misfits; Jean Grey School; Lethal Legion
- Notable aliases: Toad, The Terrible Toad-King, Stranger
- Abilities: Expert kickboxer, mechanic, and machinist; Superhuman leg and prehensile tongue strength and endurance; Superhuman agility, balance, endurance, and leaping ability and leaping distance; Moderate superhuman regeneration; Elongated prehensile tongue; Psychoactive venom secretion; Paralyzing mucus secretion; Adhesive spit; Ability to stick to walls and other surfaces and climb walls; Superhuman lung strength; can expel strong gusts of air from his lungs and stay underwater for longer periods of time than a normal human; Can communicate on a basic level with amphibians

Toad (Mortimer Toynbee) is a character appearing in American comic books published by Marvel Comics. Created by writer Stan Lee and artist/co-writer Jack Kirby, he first appeared in The X-Men #4 (March 1964).

Toad is most often depicted as an enemy of the X-Men and was originally a hunchbacked mutant with a superhuman leaping ability. He was Magneto's sniveling servant (or "toady") in the 1960s line-up of the Brotherhood of Mutants. He later became the leader of his own faction of the Brotherhood, which focused more on criminal activities than mutant liberation.

Since his inception, the character has appeared in numerous media adaptations, such as television series, films, and video games. Ray Park played a significantly different version of Toad in 2000's X-Men film, with aspects of his portrayal being incorporated into the comic book version. A younger Toad appeared in the film X-Men: Days of Future Past, played by Evan Jonigkeit, and an alternative version of the same character appeared in Deadpool & Wolverine, played by Daniel Ramos.

== Publication history ==
Toad was created by writer Stan Lee and artist/co-writer Jack Kirby, and first appeared in X-Men #4 (March 1964).

== Fictional character biography ==
=== Lackey ===
Toad was often berated and verbally abused by Magneto.

Mortimer Toynbee was born in York, England, with his mutation manifesting at birth and giving him a frog-like appearance. He was soon after abandoned by his parents and spent many years in an orphanage, where he was constantly tormented by other children. Mortimer was considered to be mentally inferior due to his extreme shyness and mild learning disabilities during his primary school years, though he was actually quite intelligent. He dropped out at an extremely early age and decided to fend for himself. Following years of abuse, Mortimer developed a severe inferiority complex.

Toad abandoning Magneto.

Later, he was recruited into Magneto's original Brotherhood of Mutants, becoming Magneto's sycophantic "toady." Toad believed that Magneto loved him, while Magneto considered him little more than a lackey. Toad also develops a crush on his teammate Scarlet Witch, but she does not return his feelings.

=== Solo career ===
Sometime later, Toad uses the Stranger's technology to menace the Avengers. He even attempts to kill Angel in a castle outfitted with traps by Arcade. However, he instead turns the castle into an amusement park and becomes its caretaker. Toad is eventually ejected from the castle by Doctor Doom and becomes suicidal, realizing that he is too dependent on others to work alone. He befriends Spider-Man and allies with Spider-Kid and Frog-Man as the superhero adventurer team, the Misfits. Toad later leaves the Misfits and returns to villainy. He forms his own version of the Brotherhood of Mutants along with Blob, Pyro, and Phantazia.

=== X-Men: Forever ===
Years later, still struggling with depression, Toad is captured by Prosh, along with Juggernaut, Iceman, Jean Grey, and Mystique as part of a time-hopping plan to stop a global threat. Toad learns that his deformed body was the result of experimentation by Juggernaut's father, Kurt Marko, at Alamogordo, New Mexico, which left him with an unstable genetic structure. The Stranger's equipment corrects his genetic flaws, giving him augmented abilities and a prehensile tongue. Though his change improves his self-esteem, Toad continued to live life without direction. He proceeds to join several short-lived incarnations of the Brotherhood of Mutants.

=== New X-Men ===
For reasons unknown, Toad returns to Magneto's side during the "Planet X" storyline. However, he is not as docile and subservient as he had been in the past, even openly questioning Magneto at times. Magneto, in turn, is tyrannical in his treatment of Toad, who had become his second-in-command. After Magneto is apparently killed, it is revealed that he had been an imposter named Xorn and that the real Magneto was still alive.

=== Civil War ===
Toad is among the 198 estimated mutants who retain their powers following the events of "Decimation", when the Scarlet Witch removes the powers of most mutants on Earth. He, Caliban, Domino, Shatterstar, and a number of other mutants hide in what they believe to be an abandoned nuclear bunker in the Nevada desert. While the X-Men and the Office of National Emergency battle outside the bunker, Johnny Dee is instructed by General Lazer to cause chaos among the 198. The group of mutants discovers this as Outlaw, controlled by Johnny, attacks Domino.

It is later revealed that the bunker was a blast-containment chamber for experimental weapons. As the auto-destruct sequence is initiated, Toad is trapped inside the chamber with the rest of the 198. The X-Men, Bishop, Iron Man, and Ms. Marvel rescue the trapped mutants, who escape unharmed.

=== Regenesis ===
After a fight between Cyclops and Wolverine, the X-Men are divided between Utopia and Westchester. Toad decides to go to Westchester with Wolverine. who accepts him as the school's janitor.

During the events of "Avengers vs. X-Men," Toad and Husk develop a sentimental relationship. The relationship leads to Toad quitting the Grey Academy to join Husk at the Hellfire Academy, where she had become a teacher. However, he is relegated to the position of janitor and witnesses Husk undergo a mental breakdown, quickly regretting that he joined.

During the "Secret Empire" storyline, Toad joins New Tian's strike force following Hydra's takeover of the United States. He gains a secondary mutation that enables him to light his tongue on fire.

During the storyline "The Trial of Magneto", the Scarlet Witch convinces Magneto to strangle her to death a part of her plan to resurrect deceased mutants whose minds were not backed up by Cerebro. After being resurrected, Scarlet Witch implicates Toad for her murder. Toad pleads guilty and is banished to the Pit of Exile. Toad is eventually freed by Cypher along with the other inmates of the Pit in exchange for leaving Krakoa and hunting down the recently escaped Sabretooth so he can be punished for his crimes.

== Powers and abilities ==
Toad's intellect and physical abilities have gone through some changes over the years. In the character's inception, he possessed superhuman leg strength, endurance, agility, reflexes, coordination, and balance, as well as a superhuman ability to leap great distances. However, over the years, Toad's original powers have increased, and he has gained additional powers through further mutation, including adhesive saliva, the ability to stick to and climb walls, and an elongated prehensile tongue.. As a result of further mutation, he now has mottled green skin and pointed ears.

Toad's primary mutant ability is a superhuman leaping ability that allows him to leap many times higher and farther than an ordinary human. He possesses some degree of superhuman strength and endurance, primarily concentrated in his lower torso and legs, which grants him superior leaping abilities. His vertebral column and skeletal structure are unusually flexible, enabling him to remain in a constant crouching position and contort his body into an unusual position without injury or strain. In his first appearances, Toad had very little knowledge of hand-to-hand combat, fighting mainly by kicking wildly and by leaping about and attempting to land on his opponents. In later appearances, he has demonstrated a better sense of combat and a leaner physique, using both his leaping ability and his tongue to his advantage.

As a result of having his genetic structure restored (thus stabilizing and augmenting his mutation), Toad gained an elastic, prehensile tongue that he can extend up to 25 feet in length and use to ensnare and constrict others. He can also secrete odorless pheromone venom and psychoactive chemicals from his tongue and fingertips that allow him to control minds to a limited extent. Thanks to special pads on his hands and feet, Toad can stick to and climb most surfaces with ease, even if they are vertical, inverted, or slick. He can also secrete a highly adhesive resin from his pores that paralyzes the nervous system of anybody who touches it. Toad has also demonstrated the ability to telepathically communicate with amphibian life (which he often uses as spies), and to expel powerful gusts of wind from his lungs.

Toad's intellect has increased beyond his original levels, and he has considerable knowledge of advanced technology and access to vast technological and scientific knowledge, which he gained as a lackey to Magneto and while he was held captive by the Stranger, as well as his studies of machinery in the possession of Arcade and Arkon. He once possessed alien technology that he stole from the Stranger's world, and could utilize it to create synthezoid robots, among other uses. He has demonstrated the ability to apply this advanced technology but lacks the creativity to make progress beyond his existing knowledge. For example, while he could construct and utilize a powerful exoskeletal armor, he would be unable to improve on its base design.

Toad later underwent a secondary mutation, gaining the ability to light his tongue on fire.

== Other versions ==
=== 1602 ===
An alternate universe version of Toad from Earth-311 appears in Marvel 1602. This version is a servant of Enrique in the Vatican.

=== Age of Apocalypse ===
An alternate universe version of Toad from Earth-295 appears in Age of Apocalypse. This version is a member of Forge's resistance group, the Outcasts, before being killed by Grizzly.

=== Amazing Spider-Man: Renew Your Vows ===
An alternate universe version of Toad from Earth-18119 appears in Amazing Spider-Man: Renew Your Vows. This version is a member of the Brotherhood of Mutants.

=== Earth X ===
An alternate universe version of Toad from Earth-9997 appears in Earth X. This version obtained Magneto's powers following a polar shift and usurped him as leader of the Brotherhood of Mutants.

=== House of M ===
An alternate universe version of Toad from Earth-58163 appears in House of M. This version is a member of Wolverine's Red Guard.

=== Marvel Noir ===
An alternate universe version of Toad from Earth-90214 appears in Marvel Noir. This version is a corrupt police officer and partner of homicide detective Fred Dukes.

=== Marvel Zombies ===
A zombified alternate universe version of Toad from Earth-2149 appears in Marvel Zombies/Army of Darkness #2.

=== Powerless ===
An alternate universe version of Toad from Earth-40081 appears in Powerless #4.

=== Ronin ===
An alternate universe version of Toad appears in X-Men Ronin.

=== Ultimate Marvel ===
An alternate universe version of Toad from Earth-1610 appears in the Ultimate Marvel universe. This version possesses a more frog-like appearance and is a member of the X-Men.

== In other media ==
=== Television ===
- Toad makes a cameo appearance in the Spider-Man and His Amazing Friends episode "The Prison Plot" as a member of Magneto's Brotherhood of Evil Mutants.
- Toad appears in X-Men: Pryde of the X-Men, voiced by Frank Welker. This version is a member of Magneto's Brotherhood of Mutant Terrorists.
- Toad appears in X-Men: The Animated Series, voiced by Tony Daniels. This version is a member of Solarr's mutant-supremacist group, the Children of the Shadow.
- A teenage incarnation of Toad named Todd Tolansky appears in X-Men: Evolution, voiced by Noel Fisher. This version speaks in a stereotypical New York accent and is a misguided juvenile delinquent, member of the Brotherhood of Bayville, and rival of Nightcrawler. In a flash-forward depicted in the two-part series finale "Ascension", Toad and his fellow Brotherhood members have reformed and joined S.H.I.E.L.D.
- Toad appears in Wolverine and the X-Men, voiced by A. J. Buckley. This version is a member of the Brotherhood of Mutants.
- Toad appears in The Super Hero Squad Show, voiced again by A. J. Buckley. This version is a member of Doctor Doom's Lethal Legion.

=== Film ===
- Toad appears in X-Men (2000), portrayed by Ray Park. This version is a member of Magneto's Brotherhood of Mutants who assists in his plot to build a machine capable of turning humans into mutants and fending off the X-Men before Toad is killed by Storm.
- A young Toad appears in X-Men: Days of Future Past (2014), portrayed by Evan Jonigkeit. In an interview, Jonigkeit stated, "I read a lot of the comic books. I found out the storyline of my character... X-Men fans will know that Ray Park played him in the first movie, so it's a generation story of how he came to be. It's really cool." This version is a former G.I. who later finds work at a diner.
- An alternate timeline variant of Toad, based on his appearance in X-Men (2000), appears in Deadpool & Wolverine (2024), portrayed by an uncredited Daniel Ramos.

=== Video games ===
- Toad appears as an unlockable character in X-Men: Mutant Academy. This version is a member of the Brotherhood of Mutants.
- Toad appears as a playable character in X-Men: Mutant Academy 2. This version is a member of the Brotherhood of Mutants.
- Toad appears as a playable character in X-Men: Next Dimension. This version is a member of the Brotherhood of Mutants.
- An amalgamated incarnation of Toad appears as a mini-boss in X-Men Legends, voiced by Armin Shimerman. This version is a member of the Brotherhood of Mutants who resembles his Ultimate Marvel counterpart and possesses the mainstream counterpart's history and personality.
- Toad appears as a playable character in X-Men Legends II: Rise of Apocalypse, voiced again by Armin Shimerman. This version is a member of the Brotherhood of Mutants.
- Toad appears in the Game Boy Advance version of X-Men: The Official Game.
- Toad appears in X-Men: Destiny, voiced by Alexander Polinsky. This version is a member of the Brotherhood of Mutants.
- Toad appears as a boss in Marvel: Avengers Alliance. This version is a member of the Brotherhood of Mutants.
- Toad appears as a playable character in Lego Marvel Super Heroes, voiced by Greg Cipes. This version is a member of the Brotherhood of Mutants.
- Toad appears in Marvel Heroes, voiced by Dave Wittenberg.
- Toad appears in Marvel's Wolverine. This version is a member of the Morlocks.

=== Merchandise ===
- Toad received a figure in the Marvel Legends toy line.
- Toad received several figures in the X-Men film tie-in line.
- Toad received a figure in the X-Men: Evolution tie-in toy line.
