= Mastermind (Jason Wyngarde) =

Marvel Comics fictional character

- Mastermind in X-Men: The Hidden Years #12 (November 2000). Art by John Byrne.

Publication information
- Publisher: Marvel Comics
- First appearance: The X-Men #4 (March 1964)
- Created by: Stan Lee (writer); Jack Kirby (artist)

In-story information
- Full name: Jason Wyngarde
- Species: Human mutant
- Team affiliations: Secret Empire; Brotherhood of Evil Mutants; Factor Three; Hellfire Club
- Notable aliases: Mastermind
- Abilities: Realistic psionic illusion casting; Memory alteration

Mastermind (Jason Wyngarde) is a supervillain appearing in American comic books published by Marvel Comics, commonly as an adversary of the X-Men. The original Mastermind was a mutant with the psionic ability to generate complex telepathic illusions at will that cause his victims to see whatever he wishes them to see. He was a founding member of the first Brotherhood of Evil Mutants and later a probationary member of the Lords Cardinal of the Hellfire Club, where he played an important role in The Dark Phoenix Saga.

After Wyngarde's death from the Legacy Virus, his three daughters appeared: two possessing his illusion-creating abilities, Mastermind (Martinique Jason) and Lady Mastermind (Regan Wyngarde), and the X-Man Pixie.

== Publication history ==
Mastermind was created by writer Stan Lee and artist/co-writer Jack Kirby, and first appeared in The X-Men #4 (March 1964).

During their time working on X-Men, Chris Claremont and John Byrne gave Mastermind the real name of Jason Wyngarde, based on British actor Peter Wyngarde, and redesigned the character to resemble Wyngarde.

== Fictional character biography ==
Jason Wyngarde was a carnival mentalist before joining the Brotherhood of Mutants. With Mastermind's help, the Brotherhood takes over Santo Marco, a fictional South American country, with an illusion of thousands of soldiers. However, the X-Men free the country, as Professor X sees through Mastermind's illusions, helping the X-Men when they believe they are trapped by a wall of flame. As a member of the Brotherhood of Mutants, he participates in repeated clashes with the X-Men. He attempts to court his teammate Scarlet Witch, but his advances seem driven more by an unsatisfied need for love than by any true feelings for her, and she repeatedly spurns him.

Mastermind tries to gain the Scarlet Witch to his side. Art by Jack Kirby.

Mastermind later joins Factor Three, an organization that attempts to conquer the Earth. Factor Three eventually disbands when their leader, the Mutant Master, is revealed to be an alien. Mastermind, alongside Factor Three members Blob and Unus the Untouchable, reform the Brotherhood of Mutants.

Mastermind becomes involved with the Hellfire Club, who conspire to capture the X-Men for their own uses. He manipulates Jean Grey through the use of his own powers and a mind-tap mechanism created by Emma Frost, making Grey that believe she is the Black Queen of the Hellfire Club and is married to him. This turns Grey against the X-Men. Cyclops attempts to free Grey on the astral plane, but Mastermind confronts him there and soundly defeats him. Cyclops' apparent death causes Grey to break free from Mastermind's control and attack him, leaving him catatonic.

Following Grey's death, Mastermind decides to use those closest to her as proxies for his revenge. He disrupts Wolverine's wedding by psionically compelling his betrothed, Mariko Yashida, to reject him and open up dealings with the criminal underworld. He manipulates the X-Men into thinking Cyclops's fiancée, Madelyne Pryor, is Grey's reincarnation, hoping to goad them into killing her before he reveals the truth. However, Cyclops recognizes the patterns of Mastermind's power, and the X-Men defeat him in a short battle.

Mastermind later dies of the Legacy Virus. Before dying, he asks Jean Grey's forgiveness for what he did to her in an attempt to gain control of the Phoenix Force. She forgives him and he dies peacefully after using his final act to save Grey from dying alongside him.

Long after his death, Mastermind is resurrected by the Five during the Krakoan Age.

== Powers and abilities ==
Mastermind has the mutant ability to cast exceptionally realistic psionic illusions. He can psionically cause other people to see, hear, feel, smell, and taste things that do not actually exist. For example, he can make himself look and sound like a different person, or look and feel like a wall, or even seem invisible. He can use his powers to duplicate himself. The range of Mastermind's powers is wide enough to affect an entire city. He is even capable of affecting telepaths as powerful as Professor X and Jean Grey, although to manipulate Dark Phoenix he required an amplifying device called a "mind-tap mechanism" provided by the White Queen that enabled him to project illusions directly into the entity's mind, so that the entity "saw" them, and to monitor the entity's thoughts, both over great distances.

== Family ==
Mastermind's name and powers still live on through his daughters: Martinique Jason and Regan Wyngarde. Both appear to be stronger than the original Mastermind; Martinique can create citywide illusions that even hypnotize people to believe they are in a whole new era and Regan's lethal illusions can continue even after she has been rendered unconscious.

In the second issue of X-Men: Pixie Strikes Back, the mother of X-Man Pixie, Mrs. Gwynn, teleports herself to the Wyngarde Mansion, where Regan is fighting with Martinique and reveals Pixie is their half-sister. Teaming up with Mrs. Gwynn who offers the sisters power in exchange for their help, they attempt to track down Pixie after being kidnapped by Saturnine. During the final confrontation with the demon, Pixie teleports both Regan and Martinique away when X-23 attempts to attack them.

== Reception ==
=== Accolades ===
- In 2009, IGN ranked Mastermind 98th in their Top 100 Comic Book Villains" list.
- In 2018, CBR.com ranked Mastermind 16th in their "25 X-Men Villains, Ranked From Weakest To Strongest" list.
- In 2019, CBR.com ranked Mastermind 2nd in their "10 X-Men Villains that Seem Totally Lame (But Are Actually Super Powerful)" list.
- In 2020, CBR.com ranked Mastermind 2nd in their "10 Best Illusionists In Marvel" list.
- In 2021, Screen Rant included Mastermind in their "X-Men: The 10 Most Powerful Members Of The Brotherhood Of Evil Mutants" list.

== Other versions ==
=== Age of Apocalypse ===
An alternate universe version of Mastermind appears in Age of Apocalypse. This version was experimented on by Sugar Man, leaving him mute. After being rescued by X-Man, Mastermind goes on to join Forge's Outcasts, a resistance cell traveling under the cover of a theater troupe. He is later killed by the bounty hunter Domino.

=== Marvel Noir ===
An alternate universe version of Jason Wyngarde appears in X-Men: Noir (one of the stories in the Marvel Noir reality) as a member of Eric Magnus's group of detectives.

=== Ultimate Marvel ===
In the Ultimate Marvel reality, Mastermind is a member of Magneto's Brotherhood of Mutant Supremacy. In the series Ultimates 3, Mastermind attacks Valkyrie, who kills him with her sword.

== In other media ==
=== Television ===
- Mastermind makes a non-speaking appearance in the Spider-Man and His Amazing Friends episode "The Prison Plot". This version is a member of Magneto's Brotherhood of Mutants who is also known as the "Maestro of Illusion".
- Mastermind appears in the X-Men: The Animated Series four-part episode "The Dark Phoenix", voiced by Nigel Bennett. This version is a member of the Inner Circle Club.
- Mastermind appears in X-Men: Evolution, voiced by Campbell Lane. This version is a member of Magneto's Acolytes.
- Mastermind appears in Marvel Anime: X-Men, voiced by Haruhiko Jō in the Japanese version and by Travis Willingham in the English version. This version is the Inner Circle's leader. He initially sought to manipulate Jean Grey into using the Phoenix Force's power until she sacrifices herself to prevent them from using it. In response, Mastermind framed Emma Frost for Grey's death, forms a secret alliance with the U-Men, and manipulates Takeo Sasaki, a mutant capable of warping reality, into using his power to allow mutants to take over the world. After the X-Men discover his schemes, Mastermind attempts to use Takeo to stop them, only to be killed by the boy after he loses control of his powers.

=== Video games ===
Mastermind appears as a playable character and boss in Lego Marvel Super Heroes, voiced again by Travis Willingham. This version is a member of the Brotherhood of Mutants.

=== Miscellaneous ===
Jason Wyngarde appears in Wolverine: The Lost Trail, voiced by Bill Irwin.
