= X-Men in film =

Adaptations of X-Men in films

Logo from the 2000–2020 film series.

Film adaptations of Marvel Comics featuring the X-Men date back to as early as 1994, when 20th Century Fox acquired the feature film and television rights to the team and associated characters from Marvel for $2.6 million USD after several unsuccessful attempts to adapt the property at other film studios and distributors throughout the prior decade. Fox released X-Men in 2000 to critical and commercial success, with the film being credited for rejuvenating mainstream interest in films featuring and adapting comic book characters alongside other licensed Marvel films released earlier in the decade. X-Men's success allowed the studio to launch a film franchise centered on the team and associated characters which included a trilogy with the initial cast until 2006, four prequel films (2011-19), a trilogy of Wolverine films (2009-2017), two Deadpool films (2016-18) and the spin-off film The New Mutants (2020), which concluded 20th Century Fox's franchise after a two-decade run.

In 2005, Marvel Studios was formed as an independent arm of the company that intended to house the production of various films using Marvel Comics characters, leading to the creation of the Marvel Cinematic Universe (MCU) franchise. Marvel was later acquired by The Walt Disney Company in December 2009 for $4 billion USD, but did not regain the film rights to the X-Men comic books due to Fox's existing licensing deal, barring the team and associated characters from appearing in the MCU or other internally-produced Marvel media for the entirety of the "Infinity Saga" arc. In March 2019, Disney completed their acquisition of 21st Century Fox for a final total of $71.3 billion USD in order to secure 20th Century Fox's various entertainment licenses, including the film rights to the X-Men and Deadpool alongside the Fantastic Four. Control over the characters' film appearances was transferred to Marvel Studios, leading to multiple Marvel-based films at Fox to be stalled and subsequently cancelled, with plans to instead integrate the respective properties into the MCU franchise. The MCU introduced mutants in the "Multiverse Saga" beginning in 2022, with many X-Men characters initially being represented by variants reprised by cast members of Fox's film series, while MCU incarnations of certain characters made appearances in other films towards the end of said storyline. A new MCU-set X-Men film with a rebooted cast and story is currently in development, scheduled for release in May 2028 as the first installment of a new saga in the franchise.

== Development ==
=== Nelvana and Orion Pictures ===
In 1982, Nelvana optioned the film rights to the X-Men comics from Marvel Entertainment. As early as 1979, Marvel's former vice president of business affairs Alice Donnenfeld Vernoux, had been tasked by former editor-in-chief Stan Lee with attempting to license off various Marvel Comics properties for adaptation in film and television in light of recent blockbuster successes such as Jaws (1975), Star Wars (1977) and Superman (1978). Nelvana founder Michael Hirsh had expressed significant interest in adapting X-Men for live-action film as a fan of the source material, and Nelvana, a studio primarily known for animated television, was similarly transitioning towards theatrical releases with their first animated feature Rock & Rule (1983).. The deal between Marvel and Nelvana stipulated that the latter studio would handle production duties on the film, while Marvel would handle responsibilities in merchandising and promotion.

Uncanny X-Men and New Mutants writer Chris Claremont was hired by Hirsh to pen the film's screenplay, ultimately producing two story outlines. Both outlines featured a team roster comprising Cyclops, Jean Grey, Storm and Wolverine alongside Professor X and Kitty Pryde as a new member. The first version of the film, tentatively titled Rite of Passage and dated for June 1982, featured Kitty Pryde as the audience surrogate character as she navigated the X-Men's world and came into conflict with her father, who became possessed by the mutant Proteus and exercised his political influence to incite mutant prejudice. Pryde would have helped the X-Men save a captive Xavier and redeem her father by the end of the film. The second outline, dated for 1983, de-emphasized Pryde's significance in favor of a plot that broadly explored the physical and ideological conflict between the X-Men and their adversaries, the Brotherhood of Mutants led by Magneto. Set during the Cold War, the narrative would have depicted Magneto using his powers to, raise an island from the ocean, destroy a Soviet submarine, and set off a volcano as an intimidation tactic. His tactics would have almost resulted in Pryde's death, at which point he saw the errors of his ways and sought redemption by the film's conclusion.

The film's production eventually stalled as Claremont chose to prioritize his work on the X-Men comic books in addition to writing novels. Nelvana then brought on Marvel Comics writers Roy Thomas and Gerry Conway to take over scripting duties, with Conway later admitting he was not aware of Claremont's prior involvement. At this point in the project, Nelvana had secured a deal to distribute the film through Orion Pictures, and two producers had boarded the project. Thomas and Conway's first draft combined elements across Claremont's two previous outlines, including Kitty as the primary point-of-view character for the world of mutants and Proteus as the primary antagonist from the first treatment, as well as a battle between the X-Men and Magneto's Brotherhood from the second treatment. According to Conway, the attached producers were dissatisfied with their initial draft and had commissioned a rewrite that notably deviated further from the source material than originally intended, removing elements previously present such as the X-Mansion, the social commentary on mutant injustices, and the omission of any references or terminology related to mutants entirely due to the implicit comparison to monsters which would have made the film harder to market as an allegory for marginalization. Jean Grey's presence in the film was replaced with an original character with the power of transforming materials as a team member, inspired by Japanese New Wave cinema in an attempt to market the film towards Japanese investors. Bernie, another original character, was written into the film as a sidekick for Kitty Pryde in order to pivot the film's focus away from her in favor of capturing more interest from a younger male audience. The film would ultimately cease production due to Orion Pictures' ongoing financial troubles throughout 1985, leading Nelvana to eventually relinquish the character rights to Marvel.

=== Carolco Pictures ===
Following the critical and commercial success of the Warner Bros. Pictures film Batman (1989), Marvel sought to rejuvenate interest in licensing out their comic book properties for film adaptation, with filmmaker James Cameron being approached to produce a live-action X-Men film for Carolco Pictures through his production studio Lightstorm Entertainment. Cameron's then-wife Kathryn Bigelow was expected to direct the film, while Gary Goldman had been attached to write the screenplay. Goldman's script, tentatively titled Wolverine and the X-Men, depicted Logan recruiting Kitty Pryde into the X-Men alongside Jean Grey, Cyclops, Nightcrawler and Mastermind, all of whom are now facilitated at "Exton Academy" as opposed to Xavier's School for Gifted Youngsters. The plot would have involved the X-Men's confrontation with a wealthy socialite and preacher Tommy Prince, who would have assembled "The Citizens' Crusade" to incite anti-mutant sympathies from the general public, at which point Mastermind would betray the team to side with his ideologies. Prince would later be revealed to be disguising his own mutant heritage, being depicted as an original take on the Magneto character with similar powers and a motivation to oppress humanity. X-Men writer Chris Claremont later recalled that the film was immediately de-prioritized as soon as Stan Lee optioned adapting Spider-Man to Cameron. Kathryn Bigelow later produced her own treatment for an X-Men film unrelated to Goldman's screenplay, with the intent of casting Bob Hoskins and Angela Bassett as Wolverine and Storm, respectively, but it was immediately dismissed due to Cameron's increased interest in a Spider-Man feature. Cameron's Spider-Man film would similarly never materialize as a result of Carolco becoming embroiled in a dispute over the ownership of the character's film rights between themselves, Marvel and distributor 21st Century Films, before all three entities declared bankruptcy, with both the X-Men and Spider-Man feature film rights reverting to Marvel upon their re-emergence in the late 1990s.

=== 20th Century Fox ===
Marvel entered early discussions with Columbia Pictures regarding a live-action X-Men film in 1992 just as the studio was also entering development on a Black Panther film, but the film did not materialize past these conversations. Instead, 20th Century Fox separately engaged Marvel about acquiring the character rights, having been impressed by the success of X-Men: The Animated Series (1992-97) on their sister network Fox Kids during syndication. Film producer Lauren Shuler Donner successfully secured the license to develop the film at Fox in 1994. Donner brought on Andrew Kevin Walker to screenwrite the project, with two drafts of the script delivered by the following June. Walker's storyline involved the government initiating the Mutant Registration Act in response to a terrorist attack orchestrated by Magneto and his Brotherhood of Mutants, which consisted of Toad, Blob, Sabretooth and Juggernaut, who would be broken out of Ryker's Island by the trio and recruited into their ranks. The film would heavily center around the X-Men (Cyclops, Jean Grey, Beast, Iceman and Angel) and their efforts to recruit Wolverine and Jubilee, as well as the human antagonists Bolivar Trask and Henry Peter Gyrich, who construct Sentinels to eliminate mutants. The screenplay also included other elements of the comics such as Department H being Wolverine and Sabretooth's former unit in Canada, the X-Copter, the Danger Room training facility, the Vault as a supermax prison for superhumans, and Magneto establishing a safe haven for mutants conceptually similar to Genosha after taking over Manhattan. Film producer Laeta Kalogridis performed rewrites on Walker's story throughout 1995, and introduced Storm to the team roster, setting up a subplot exploring a potential romantic relationship with Wolverine. Author and Spider-Man 2 (2004) co-screenwriter Michael Chabon submitted his own treatment to Fox in 1996, which featured a team roster of Professor X, Cyclops, Jean Grey, Beast, Iceman, Nightcrawler and Storm, and omitted the Brotherhood of Mutants as antagonists in favor of setting them up in a potential sequel.

== 20th Century Fox films ==
=== Original trilogy ===
==== X-Men (2000) ====
When a young teen named Rogue goes on the run and crosses paths with cage fighter Logan / Wolverine, the pair are suddenly embroiled in an intense conflict over their fate as mutants, individuals who are born with a unique gene that grants them superhuman abilities and augmentations. They are recruited into the X-Men, a team of mutants who fight for the preservation of mutantkind while upholding their leader Charles Xavier's ideology of peaceful co-existence with humanity, despite facing discrimination and prejudice from them in their efforts to protect them. The X-Men, also comprising field leader Cyclops, telepath Jean Grey and weather manipulator Storm, face off against the mutant extremist Magneto and his Brotherhood of Mutants, who threaten to mutate world leaders in an attempt to escalate his plans for supremacy over humans.

In addition to the X-Men and the Brotherhood, numerous named mutants from X-Men comics make cameo appearances as students of Xavier's School for Gifted Youngsters, including Bobby Drake / Iceman (Shawn Ashmore), Kitty Pryde (Sumela Kay), Piotr Rasputin / Colossus (Donald McKinnon) and John Allerdyce / Pyro (Alexander Burton). Additionally, George Buza, who voices Beast in X-Men: The Animated Series (1992–97) and X-Men '97 (2024-present), appears as a truck driver who drops Rogue off to the bar where Wolverine works as a cage fighter.

==== X2 (2003) ====
After a failed assassination attempt on the President of the United States by a brainwashed teleporting mutant named Nightcrawler, anti-mutant military scientist Col. William Stryker is enlisted to stage an attack on Xavier's School for Gifted Youngsters, kidnapping Cyclops and Charles Xavier alongside several mutant children and encountering Wolverine, revealed to be his former test subject during the Weapon X program. The remaining X-Men form a reluctant alliance with Magneto and his Brotherhood of Mutants in order to infiltrate Stryker's base at Alkali Lake and prevent Stryker from using Cerebro and the captive Xavier to telepathically kill every mutant on Earth, while Logan uncovers more about his shrouded past.

The X-Men are expanded in this film with the inclusion of Kurt Wagner / Nightcrawler as a new member in addition to both Colossus and Pyro briefly joining the team, being respectively recast with actors Daniel Cudmore and Aaron Stanford. The latter defects from the X-Men to side with Magneto's Brotherhood of Mutants by the end of the film, while Iceman fully joins the team as a recurring member. Yuriko Oyama / Lady Deathstrike (Kelly Hu), who is not traditionally depicted as a mutant in the comics, is reinterpreted as a brainwashed mutant enforcer of William Stryker's who shares Logan's regenerative healing and sports elongated nails, coated in the same adamantium metal as Wolverine's claws. Jason Stryker is reimagined in the film as "Jason 143", a lobotomized mutant who is unable to walk, and who has the ability to project illusions, used by his father to manipulate the captive Xavier into using Cerebro for targeting and mass-exterminating the mutant population of Earth. As with the first film, other mutants feature in cameo appearances as students of Xavier's school, including Kitty Pryde (Katie Stuart) and Jubilee (Kea Wong) and Theresa Rourke / Siryn (Shuana Kain), who uses her sonic scream to incapcitate one of Stryker's men. Steve Bacic makes a brief appearance as Dr. Hank McCoy on a television broadcast. In the film's final scene, two children respectively dressed in a Native American jacket and blue attire were identified as Dani Moonstar and Douglas Ramsey / Cypher.

A scene in the film involves Mystique accessing Stryker's computer and uncovering a comprehensive database compiling all known active mutants in the world and their power levels. Named references to mutants in the comics include Maria Callasantos / Feral, Angelo Espinosa / Skin, Paige Guthrie / Husk, Sam Guthrie / Cannonball, Remy LeBeau / Gambit, Ruth Bat-Seraph / Sabra, Jamie Madrox / Multiple Man, Lila Cheney, Alison Blaire / Dazzler, Xian Coy Mahn / Karma, Kevin McTaggert / Proteus, Sally Blevins / Skids, and Elizabeth "Betsy" Braddock / Psylocke. In addition, there are two separate entries referencing multiple "Cassidys" and "Maximoffs", likely referring to the pair Black Tom Cassidy and Sean Cassidy / Banshee, as well as the twins Wanda Maximoff / Scarlet Witch and Pietro Maximoff / Quicksilver; a separate entry references Franklin Richards, the mutant son of Reed Richards and Susan Storm of the Fantastic Four.

==== X-Men: The Last Stand (2006) ====
When the United States government manufactures a "cure" for the mutant gene, the mutant population is left divided on its potential benefits and repercussions. Magneto assembles a faction of mutants strongly opposed to its distribution to declare war on humanity, claiming their intent to use the cure as a means of further marginalizing the mutant race. As the X-Men confront Magneto and the morality behind the government's intentions, their formerly deceased team member Jean Grey is resurrected as the Phoenix, a destructive, evil entity within her mind that threatens to destroy both mutants and humanity on a far greater scale. As the vulnerable Grey is torn between her allegiance to the X-Men and Magneto's manipulation, the team prepare for a final battle which will decide her fate, and their own.

Kelsey Grammer and Elliot Page join the main cast as X-Men members Hank McCoy / Beast and Kitty Pryde / Shadowcat after making cameo appearances in both previous films; the latter is introduced as Rogue's romantic rival for the affections of Iceman. Ben Foster recurs in the film as Warren Worthington III / Angel, who begins the film presiding with his human father Warren Worthington II before ultimately rejecting him to join the X-Men. Cain Marko / Juggernaut (Vinnie Jones), traditionally depicted in the comics as an adversary of the X-Men and stepbrother of Charles Xavier, who is enhanced by the Crimson Gem of Cyttorak, is reinterpreted as a mutant whose X-gene enabled him the characteristics of superhuman strength and endurance, with no relationship towards Xavier. He joins Magneto's Brotherhood of Mutants alongside Jamie Madrox / Multiple Man (Eric Dane), who is similarly broken out of a mobile prison. During the film's events, Magneto makes an appeal to a mutant congregate opposing the cure's administration who call themselves the 'Omegas', led by Callisto (Dania Ramirez), who is adapted as a composite between her comics counterpart and Caliban, another member of her original group, the Morlocks. Other members of the Omegas include Psylocke (Mei Melançon), Arclight (Omahyra Mota), Spike (Lance Gibson), Glob Herman (Clayton Dean Watmough), and Quill (Ken Leung), who is erroneously credited as Quentin Quire / Kid Omega. The character Jimmy (Cameron Bright), whose trait of depowering other mutations is being isolated to produce the cure, is codenamed "Leech" after the Morlock of the same name in the comics, who has similar powers. In addition to Shauna Kain and Kea Wong reprising their cameo roles as Jubilee and Siryn from X2, three identical blonde girls portrayed by an unnamed actor make appearances as Xavier's students, alluding to the Stepford Cuckoos, the psychically linked clone twins of Hellfire Club and X-Men member Emma Frost.

=== Prequel films ===
A film exploring the young, first-generation X-Men team was initially conceived during production of X2 by producer Lauren Shuler Donner. It was then revived when the film's writer Zak Penn was tasked with scripting such a narrative during development of The Last Stand. In 2009, X-Men film producer Simon Kinberg read the Marvel Comics limited series X-Men: First Class, an modern depiction of the early adventures for the original six X-Men, optioning this storyline to Fox for adaptation, but wishing to take it in a different direction due to the comic's similarities to other coming-of-age films . Bryan Singer outlined the story which would feature Charles Xavier and Erik Lehnsherr in their twenties. Matthew Vaughn was courted by Fox to direct the film but hesitated, as he had already been ousted from the production of both The Last Stand and the Marvel Studios film Thor, ultimately boarding First Class due to his present enthusiasm in pursuing a Marvel adaptation, as well as feeling more creatively liberated in the process due to not having to adhere to an existing continuity as with his involvement in The Last Stand. The prequels were positioned by Vaughn as a spiritual reboot that could "start a whole new X-Men franchise," while co-producer Jane Goldman described the film as an "alternate history" for the X-Men characters that would not necessarily contradict the continuity of the original trilogy, in the same way the comics had undertaken different creative directions over its publication history.

==== X-Men: First Class (2011) ====
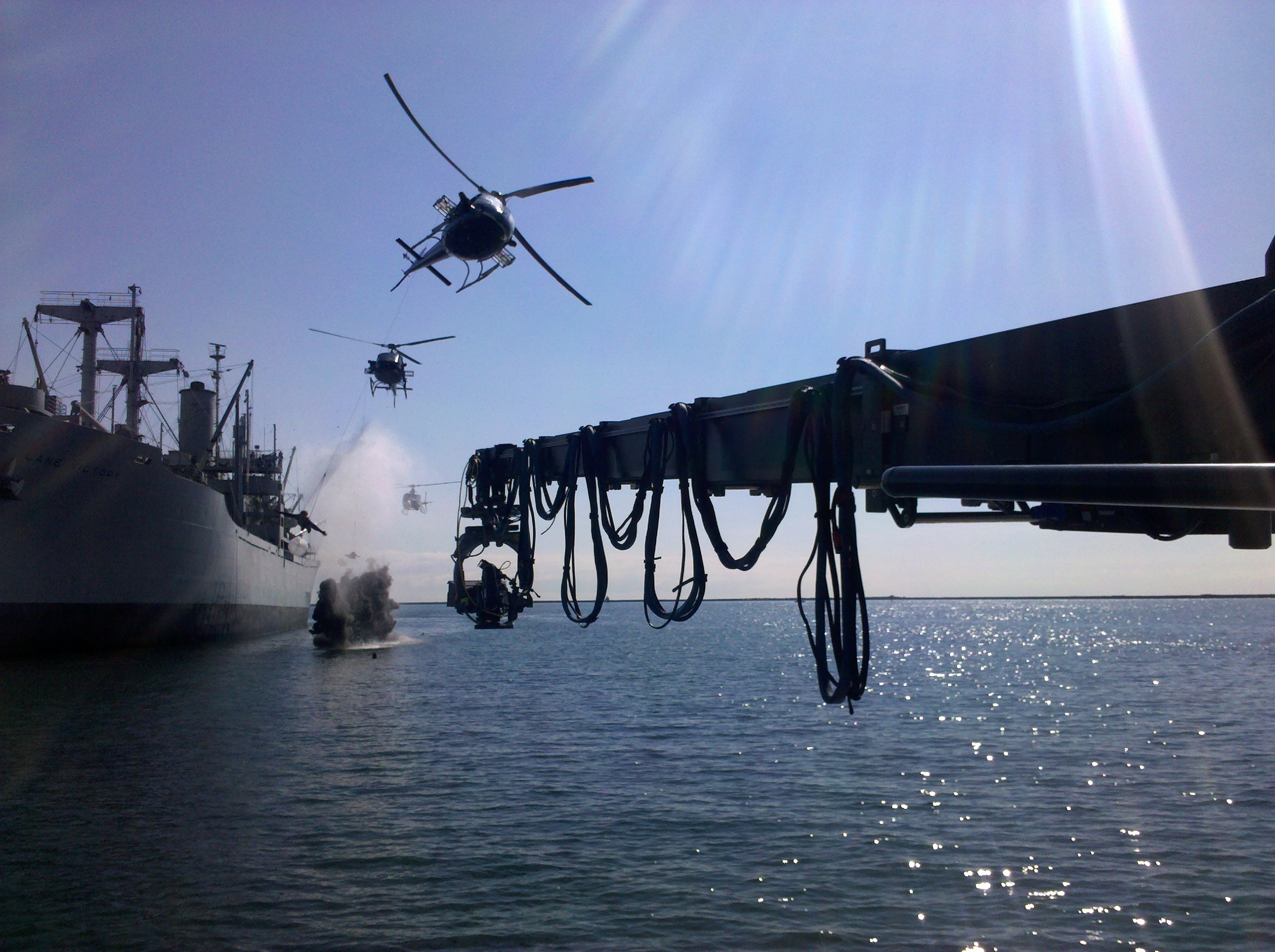
Naval film set for First Class, February 2011

During the Cuban Missile Crisis in 1962, fresh university graduate and mutant expert Charles Xavier is recruited by the CIA to a top-secret project known as "Division X" as a liaison between human officials and the emerging mutant population. He, alongside new colleague Erik Lensherr, who occupies a more exclusivist view of mutant-human relations, are tasked with assembling a strike force composed of young mutants as a first line of defense against the Hellfire Club, a secret society led by Sebastian Shaw which threatens to provoke a third World War and trigger an ascendancy of the mutant race over a massacred human population.

The film chronicles the friendship and eventual parting of ways between a young Xavier and Lensherr as they embrace their destined paths physically and ideologically. As opposed to including younger versions of X-Men already featured in the original trilogy, First Class comprises mutants that are reimagined to fit the period setting, or were seldom adapted in the films up to this point. The film establishes that Raven / Mystique was once Xavier's childhood friend and adopted sister, as well as an early recruit to the team, here codenamed 'Division X', before embracing Lensherr's perspective. Also recruited is a young Hank McCoy / Beast (Nicholas Hoult), who is introduced in his human form as he attempts to synthesize a possible cure for abnormalities in his mutation, such as his prehensile, ape-like feet. Applying the cure on himself only accelerates his mutation, transforming him into his blue feline form from the majority of his comics appearances and the previous X-Men films. Other members of 'Division X' include Alex Summers / Havok (Lucas Till), the brother of future X-Men member, Scott Summers / Cyclops; Armando Muñoz / Darwin (Edi Gathegi), Angel Salvadore (Zoë Kravitz), and Sean Cassidy / Banshee (Caleb Landry Jones), who was reinterpreted as an American from his Irish heritage in the comics.

==== X-Men: Days of Future Past (2014) ====
In a dystopian 2023, mutants are endlessly hunted by the Sentinels, artificially intelligent humanoid machines designed to kill them by instantaneously adapting to their varied powers. In order to reverse this future, a team of surviving X-Men led by Charles Xavier and Magneto send Wolverine back in time to 1973, tasking him with preventing the assassination of the Sentinels' creator, Bolivar Trask by a young Mystique which accelerated the development and mass-production of the weapons systems. In order to succeed, Logan must track down the younger incarnations of Xavier and Magneto in the hopes that their combined presence would help dissuade Mystique from her goals while also averting the cataclysmic future they all face.

==== X-Men: Apocalypse (2016) ====
In 1983, Apocalypse, considered in legend as the world's most ancient mutant, awakens from a deep slumber spanning thousands of years and intends to wage war with the modern world upon being disillusioned with what society had developed towards in his absence. He travels across the world recruiting Storm, Angel, Psylocke and Magneto as his four Horsemen, in order to cleanse all of humanity in favor of a new world order where mutants are dominant. Mystique and Professor X lead a new generation of X-Men in order to prevent Apocalypse's planned destruction of all mankind.

==== Dark Phoenix (2019) ====
In 1992, the X-Men are well regarded as superheroes to the public and are constantly sent on missions in order to improve their public image at the behest of Professor X. One fateful mission ends in disarray when Jean Grey accidentally absorbs the Phoenix Force during a space excursion, rendering her abilities heightened and uncontrollable as she develops destructive tendencies under the influence of Vuk, a member of the D'Bari race whose home planet was previously destroyed by the Phoenix Force, who now intends to use Grey's awakened power to enact revenge.

=== Spinoffs ===
==== Wolverine films ====
===== X-Men Origins: Wolverine (2009) =====
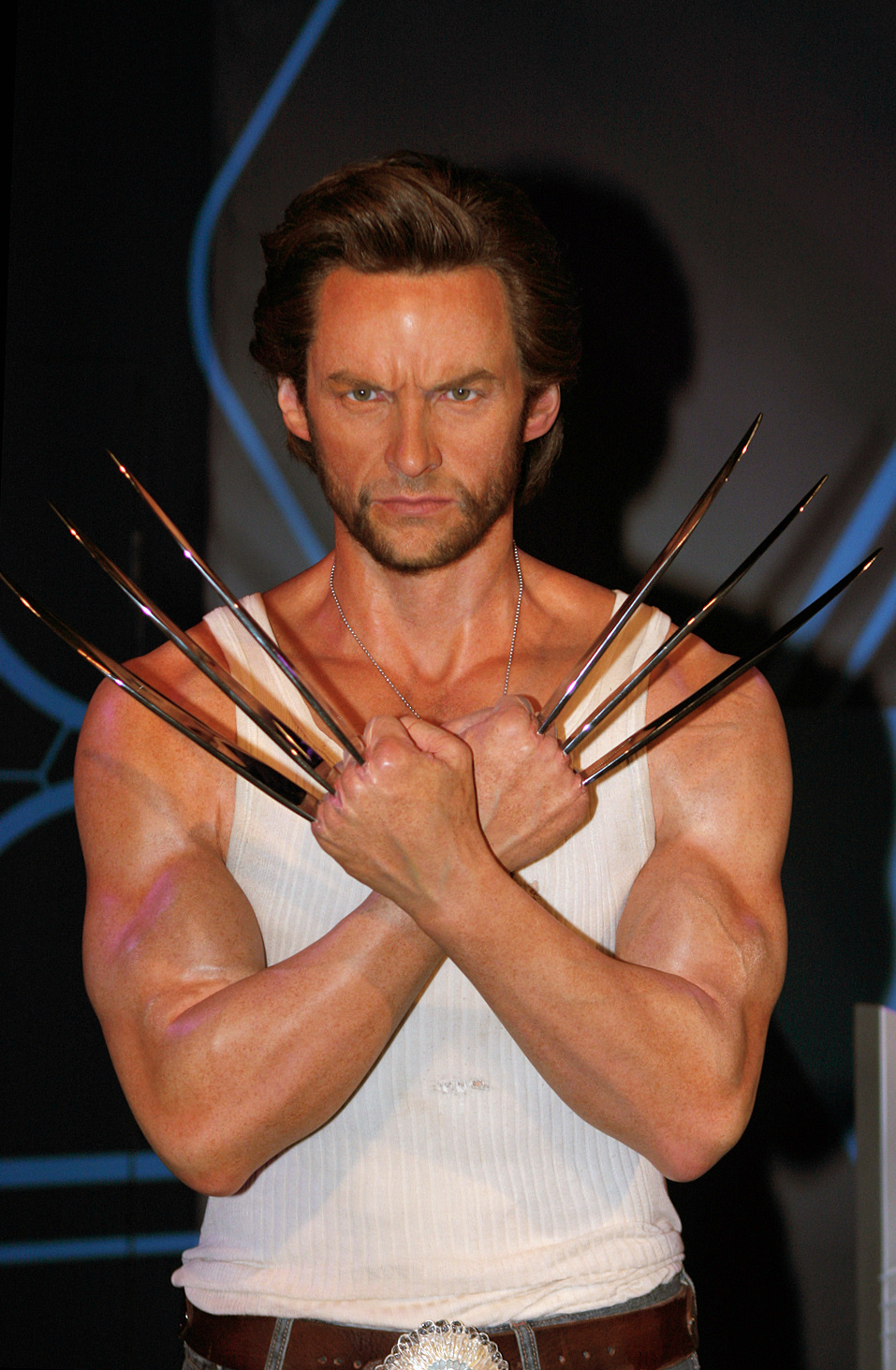
Wax statue of Wolverine circa 2009

The story features Logan's violent past, starting in 1845 Canada where young James Howlett's mutant bone claws emerge after his father's death, leading him to flee with his half-brother Victor Creed (Sabretooth). The brothers fight together in various wars (Civil War, WWI, WWII, Vietnam) due to their healing factors but Logan leaves after witnessing atrocities. Years later, living peacefully as "Logan" with Kayla, his past catches up when Victor seemingly murders her, driving Logan to join the Weapon X program, where his skeleton is bonded with indestructible adamantium, setting him on a path of vengeance against Victor and Colonel Stryker, encountering mutants like Deadpool and Gambit.

The popularity of Logan's character throughout the original trilogy sparked internal interest in pursuing a standalone spin-off that would derive from the self-contained Wolverine comic books, and screenwriter David Benioff was commissioned by Fox to pen the screenplay in October 2004. Origins: Wolverine is primarily inspired by the comics story arc "Weapon X" which appeared between Marvel Comics Presents #72-84 (March-September 1991), while also deriving from the 1982 limited series by Chris Claremont and Frank Miller, cited as Benioff's personal favorite Wolverine arc. Around the film's development, Marvel Comics published Origin, a 2001 limited series that fully unveiled Wolverine's origin story spanning his childhood, to his young adult years before the Weapon X program or the X-Men, which heavily informed the film.

===== The Wolverine (2013) =====
The story of the film is set after X-Men: The Last Stand. It focuses on Logan's internal struggle with his immortality and guilt over killing Jean Grey. The story is largely set in Japan and follows Logan as he battles a conspiracy set by Yashida while his healing powers are compromised.

Despite X-Men Origins: Wolverine being released to a largely negative critical and fan reception, Fox pursued a follow-up, now positioned as a standalone continuation of X-Men: The Last Stand and building on the film's post-credits scene, which teased a setting in Japan and a more direct adaptation of Claremont and Miller's limited series. Darren Aronofsky was initially attached to direct in October 2010 from a screenplay written by Christopher McQuarrie. Both were subsequently replaced by the writing team of Scott Frank and Mark Bomback, and director James Mangold. The supporting characters were cast in July 2012 with principal photography beginning at the end of the month around New South Wales before moving to Tokyo in August 2012 and back to New South Wales in October 2012. The film was converted to 3D in post-production.

===== Logan (2017) =====
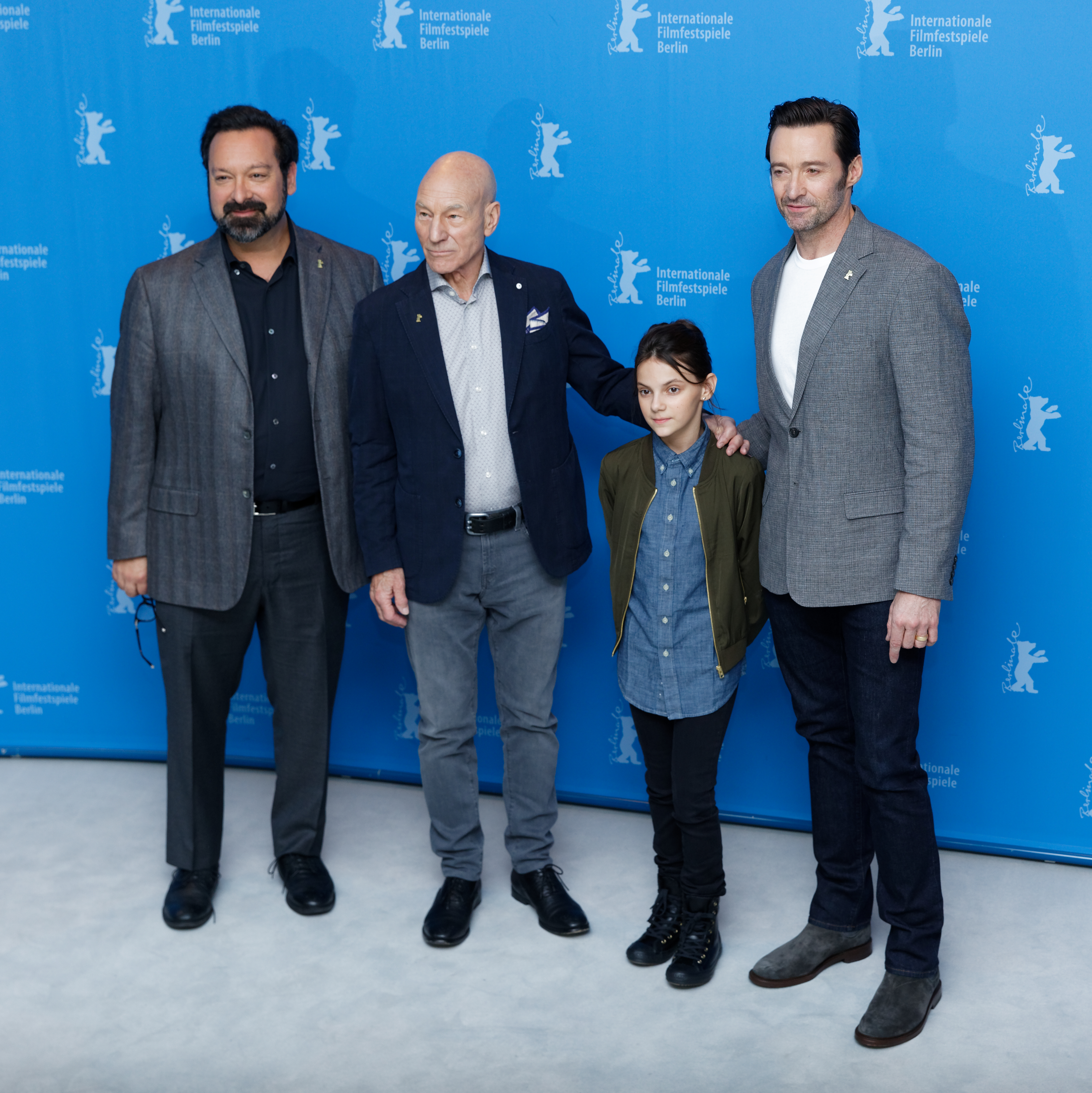
Mangold, Patrick Stewart, Dafne Keen, and Hugh Jackman at a Logan Berlinale photocall, February 2017

Logan is a gritty, R-rated superhero film set in a bleak future (2029) where mutants are nearly extinct and Logan/Wolverine is an aged, weary man whose healing factor is failing as he cares for a senile Professor X in hiding near the Mexican border. Their quiet life is upended when a young mutant girl, Laura/X-23, appears seeking passage to Canada, pursued by sinister forces from the corporation that created her from Logan's DNA, forcing Logan to confront his past and legacy on a final, violent journey to protect her and other escaped mutant children, ultimately finding redemption in sacrifice as he dies to give them hope for a better future.

In November 2013, 20th Century Fox initiated discussions over another solo film starring Wolverine, with James Mangold in negotiations to write the treatment for the film and Lauren Shuler Donner returning to produce under The Donners' Company. Later in the month, Mangold announced that the pre-production aspect of the film had not yet begun, nor the writing process, though he furthered this by stating, "... I would say I'm not there yet. But I have taken finger to key. Let's say that. There's been typing. And ideas. And talking amongst all the principles".

==== Deadpool films ====
===== Deadpool (2016) =====
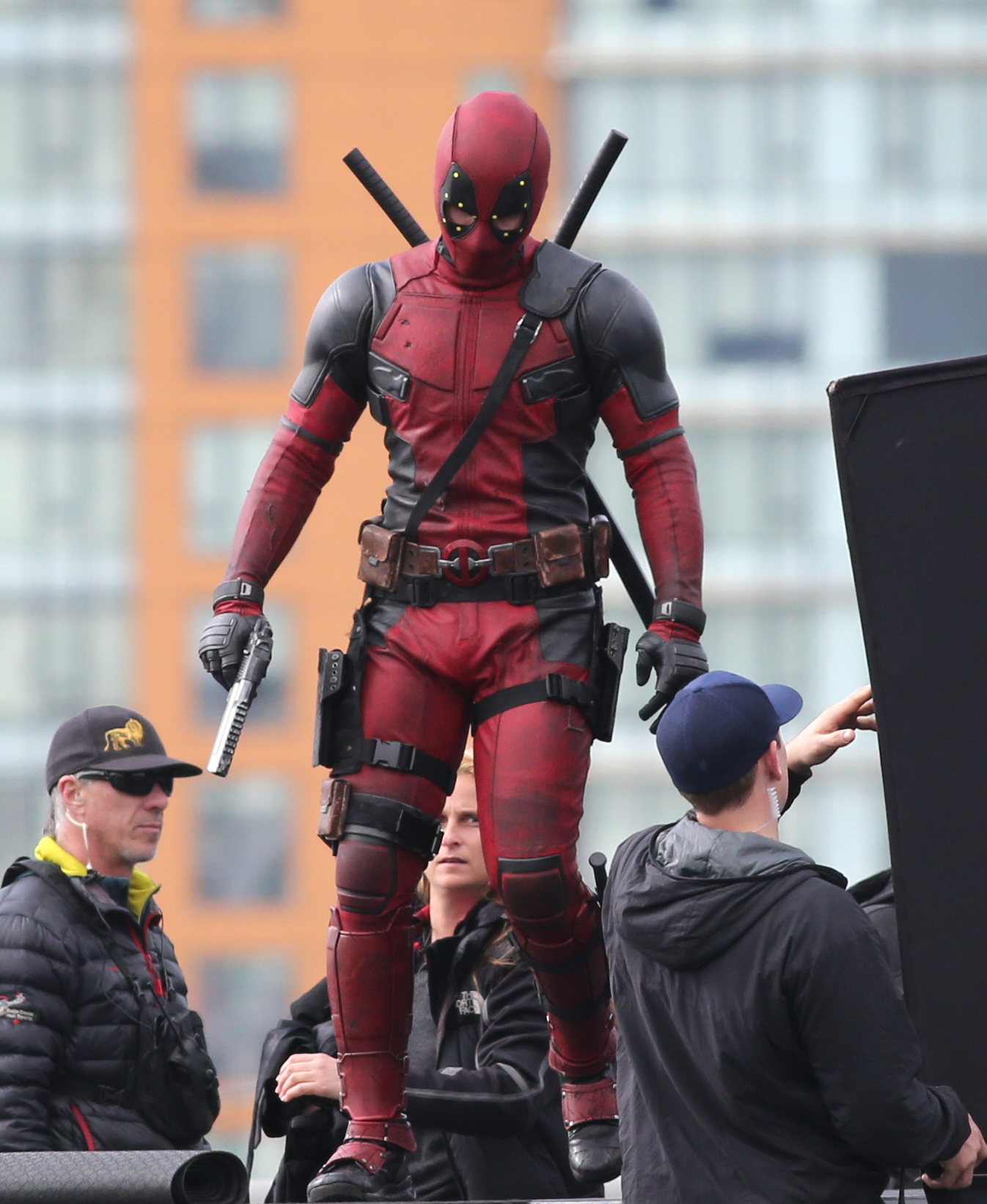
Reynolds in costume as Deadpool

The film follows mercenary Wade Wilson, who, after being diagnosed with terminal cancer, undergoes a brutal Weapon X experiment to cure it, gaining accelerated healing but becoming horribly disfigured. Seeking revenge on the scientist Ajax (Francis) who mutilated him, he adopts the masked persona of Deadpool, a foul-mouthed anti-hero, and teams up with X-Men mutants Colossus and Negasonic Teenage Warhead to hunt down Ajax and save his love interest Vanessa. The film is known for its dark humor, graphic violence, and breaking the fourth wall.

A film featuring the character first entered development as part of a multi-picture deal between Marvel and Artisan Entertainment in 2000. The project was transferred to New Line Cinema by February 2004, with David S. Goyer penning the screenplay, and Ryan Reynolds attached to play the character, having been inspired to pursue the role after learning of Deadpool likening himself to "Ryan Reynolds crossed with a Shar-Pei" in the comics. The film's development at New Line ended due to legal complications, ultimately setting the project at 20th Century Fox due to Deadpool's frequent recurrence in X-Men comics. Reynolds was cast to appear as the character in X-Men Origins: Wolverine, initially via a cameo appearance, before being expanded into a prominent supporting role that would lead into a standalone film. The film was negatively received, with particular critic and fan ire directed at the film's interpretation of Deadpool. Despite this, a Deadpool film which would ignore Origins: Wolverine's version of the character entered early development following the film's release. Reynolds' subsequent role in the critically panned Green Lantern (2011) led Fox to doubt Deadpool's commercial prospects, particularly due to the film being projected for an R-rating, unconventional for comic book films at this time.

Following a greenlight from 20th Century Fox in 2014 after test footage for a potential film was leaked, principal photography took place in Vancouver, British Columbia, between March and May 2015. Several vendors provided visual effects for the film, ranging from the addition of blood and gore to the creation of the CGI character Colossus. Deadpool premiered at the Le Grand Rex in Paris on February 8, 2016, and was released in the United States on February 12, following an unconventional marketing campaign.

The film achieved both critical and commercial success, earning $782.6 million against a $58 million budget, becoming the ninth-highest-grossing film of 2016 and breaking numerous records, including the highest-grossing film in the X-Men series and the highest-grossing R-rated film at the time.

===== Deadpool 2 (2018) =====
Deadpool 2 follows Wade Wilson (Deadpool) as he deals with grief after losing his girlfriend, Vanessa, leading to suicidal tendencies and an eventual alliance with the X-Men to protect a young, powerful mutant named Russell (Firefist) from a cybernetic soldier from the future, Cable, who seeks to kill Russell to prevent a dystopian future. Deadpool forms the X-Force team to help, leading to a climactic battle where he sacrifices himself for Russell, changing history and allowing Cable to use his time device to save Wade, ultimately giving him a chance to reunite with Vanessa in a new timeline.

Plans for a sequel to Deadpool began before the original film's release, and were confirmed in February 2016. Though the original creative team of Reynolds, Reese, Wernick, and director Tim Miller were set to return for the second film, Miller left the project in October 2016 due to creative differences with Reynolds and was soon replaced by Leitch. An extensive casting search took place to fill the role of Cable, with Brolin ultimately cast. Principal photography took place in British Columbia from June to October 2017.

The film outgrossed its predecessor, earning $785.9 million worldwide against a $110 million production budget, becoming the ninth highest-grossing film of 2018, the highest-grossing film in the X-Men series, and the highest-grossing R-rated film at the time of its release. The film received positive reviews from critics, with some considering it superior to the first film and praising its humor, cast performances, story, and action sequences, while others criticized its tone, script, and recycled jokes.

==== The New Mutants (2020) ====
The story features five young mutants Mirage, Wolfsbane, Cannonball, Sunspot, and Magik held in a secret facility, led by Dr. Cecilia Reyes, who are trying to understand and control their dangerous powers while facing terrifying visions of their pasts.

== Marvel Cinematic Universe ==
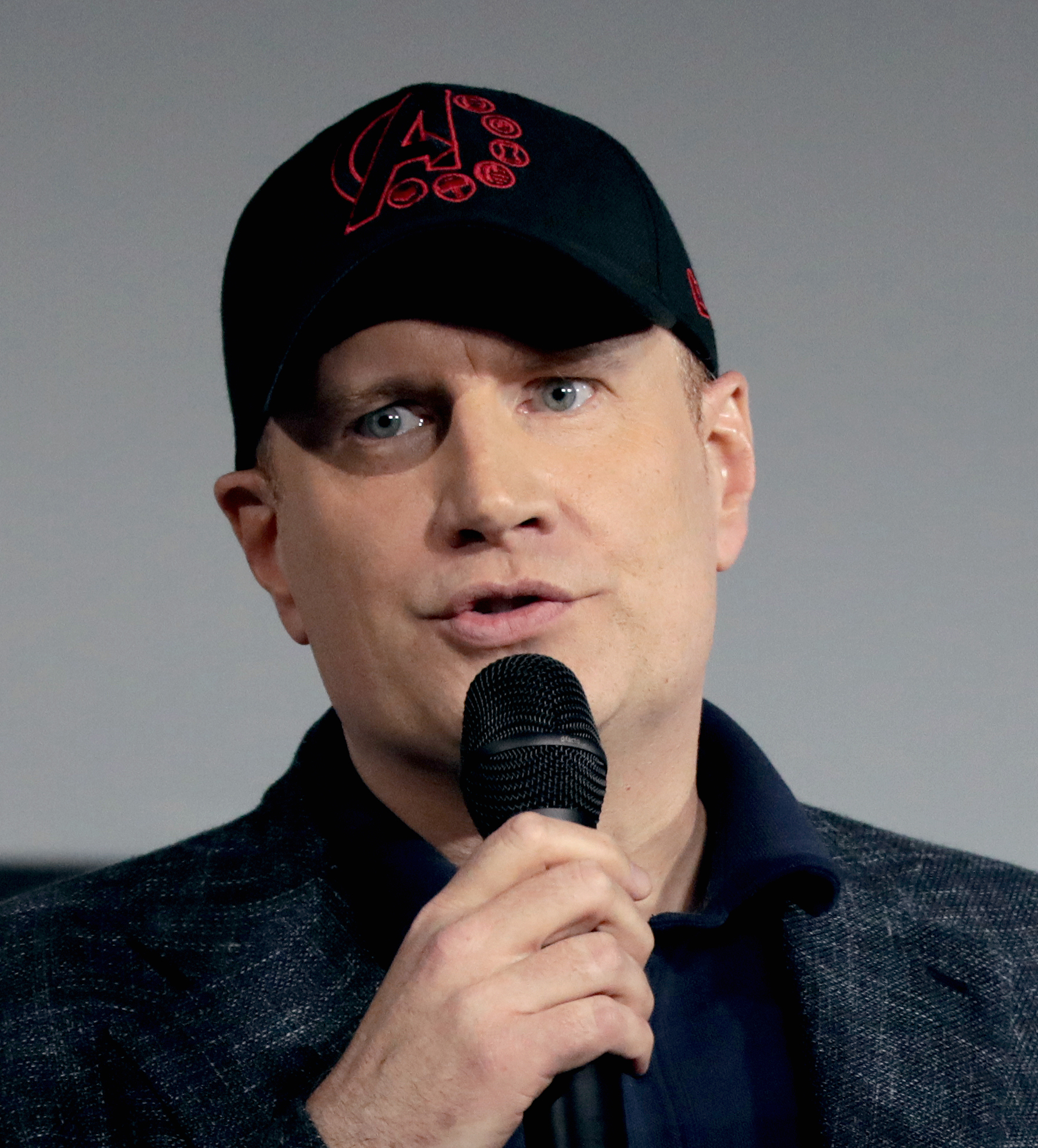
Marvel Studios president Kevin Feige, previously an assistant producer on the original X-Men film trilogy, oversees the Marvel Cinematic Universe (MCU) franchise and assumed control over X-Men projects released since 2024.

In 2004, Marvel Enterprises announced plans to restructure their operations and transition towards self-financing theatrical films using their characters as opposed to retaining a licensing-only model with other production studios.

Newly formed as Marvel Entertainment, the company established Marvel Studios in 2005 and entered a nonrecourse debt arrangement with Merrill, that provided $525 million in financing to produce a 10-film slate around a selection of properties for which they still possessed the film rights. The first film produced by Marvel Studios, Iron Man (2008) was both a critical and financial success, launching Marvel's long-term plan for individual character films that comprised what became the first phase of the Marvel Cinematic Universe (MCU).

During the production of the first set of MCU films, in December 2009, The Walt Disney Company acquired Marvel Entertainment, securing the rights to over 5,000 Marvel Comics characters at the time in licensing, merchandising, publishing and film production, which included all distribution rights to future Marvel Studios and MCU films, beginning with The Avengers in 2012. However, the acquisition did not secure Disney any feature film rights pertaining to the X-Men due to the pre-existing arrangement with 20th Century Fox from 1994.

In May 2013, Joss Whedon, who had previously directed and co-written The Avengers, announced the inclusion of Scarlet Witch and Quicksilver in the film's sequel, later titled Avengers: Age of Ultron (2015), remarking on their potential to represent "the part of the world that wouldn't necessarily agree with the Avengers", in addition to establishing a unique "brother/sister duo" dynamic that distinguished them among the ensemble. Marvel and 20th Century Fox disputed over the film rights, as both characters were conceived in The X-Men #4 (March 1964) as members of the Brotherhood of Mutants that opposed the X-Men, and later revealed to be the offspring of Erik Lensherr / Magneto, leading to Fox claiming complete control over their film adaptations. Likewise, Marvel and Disney asserted ownership due to their broader editorial history tying the pair closer to the Avengers mythos than X-Men comics. Both studios elected to co-opt the film rights to the Maximoff twins, on the stipulation that Marvel Studios could not depict them as mutants or reference their familial heritage towards Magneto, while Fox could not adapt stories featuring the characters working alongside the Avengers. Elizabeth Olsen and Aaron Taylor-Johnson were respectively cast as Wanda Maximoff and Pietro Maximoff for the MCU in late 2013, debuting in the post-credits scene of Captain America: The Winter Soldier (2014). In the MCU, the Maximoffs are humans given their respective psionic and super-speed abilities through experiments conducted by Hydra. While Taylor-Johnson's Quicksilver is killed in Age of Ultron, Wanda's role is expanded through subsequent films and the Disney+ series WandaVision (2021), the latter of which formally introduced the Scarlet Witch moniker in the MCU.

On December 14, 2017, The Walt Disney Company announced their intentions to acquire 21st Century Fox for a starting bid of $52.4 billion USD in stock, in an effort to secure 20th Century Fox's various film and television studios in addition to its entertainment licenses, which included the film rights to the X-Men alongside the Fantastic Four and Deadpool. In September 2018, Disney CEO Bob Iger stated that the aforementioned Marvel Comics characters owned by Fox were to be fully integrated into the MCU franchise following the acquisition, feeling strongly that Marvel should retain supervision over all its franchises. Following a brief bidding war with Comcast, the merger was finalized and closed on March 20, 2019 at a final total of $71.3 billion USD. X-Men film series producer Lauren Shuler Donner announced in February that Disney had put Fox's various Marvel-based projects in development "on hold", and that she wished for the franchise to go in a new direction under the leadership of Marvel Studios producer Kevin Feige, who previously collaborated with her on the original X-Men film trilogy. By mid-2019, all of Fox's Marvel IP films had been canceled as control over the characters had been completely transferred to Marvel Studios.

During their Hall H panel at San Diego Comic-Con in July 2019, Kevin Feige announced that that mutants were slated to be introduced in the MCU in the future. In a post-panel interview, Feige was asked about not explicitly identifying the X-Men team, responding that he considered the terms 'mutants' and 'X-Men' interchangeable, and that Marvel's approach to the characters would differ from Fox's film series. While promoting Ant-Man and the Wasp: Quantumania in February 2023, Feige confirmed that Marvel Studios now had a solidified plan to introduce mutants in the franchise following the introductions of Kamala Khan / Ms. Marvel and Namor as among the MCU's earliest identified mutants in prior projects, stating that they had been working on timing how and when they'd feature the race more prominently for years. At the world premiere of Deadpool & Wolverine in July 2024, Feige officially confirmed that the film marked the beginning of the MCU's "mutant era", with mutants set to appear more prominently in projects within the franchise going forward. The Wall Street Journal reported in May 2025 that the upcoming ensemble films Avengers: Doomsday (2026) and Avengers: Secret Wars (2027) were anticipated to formally introduce the X-Men team to the MCU outside the former featuring characters from 20th Century Fox's original X-Men trilogy, and that Kevin Feige had a 10-year plan in place for mutants in the franchise. In a July 2025 interview, Feige confirmed that Marvel Studios intended to completely reboot the X-Men film franchise with a new cast following Secret Wars, further reiterating the appeal of telling new stories about "people who feel different and who feel Other and who feel like they don't belong." Since 2022, mutants have featured in various Marvel Cinematic Universe films.

=== Title roles ===
==== Deadpool & Wolverine (2024) ====
Marvel Studios repurposed a third Deadpool film inherited from Fox into Deadpool & Wolverine. Shawn Levy was hired to direct, having been courted by Reynolds for the job. The men developed the script with Reese, Wernick, and Zeb Wells. Deadpool & Wolverine merges the Fox universe with the MCU through a multiverse story and features several of its associated characters, chiefly Jackman's Wolverine and Reynolds's Deadpool. Its end credits include a montage of clips and behind-the-scenes footage as a tribute to the Fox films. Principal photography, which lasted between May 2023 and January 2024, had been suspended due to the 2023 SAG-AFTRA strike. Deadpool & Wolverine premiered in July 2024 and polarized critics, but ended its theatrical run as the highest grossing R-rated film of all time with $1.338 billion.

==== Untitled X-Men film (2028) ====
A new X-Men film produced by Marvel Studios, which will reboot the franchise and formally introduce the team in the MCU following Avengers: Secret Wars (2027), entered the early stages of development in September 2023 following the conclusion of the 2023 SAG-AFTRA strike. In May 2024, Michael Lesslie entered negotiations to write the film, and was confirmed to have boarded the project by the following year. Jake Schreier entered negotiations to direct the film in May 2025, becoming the studio's top choice due to the positive reception of his MCU film Thunderbolts* that month. Producer Kevin Feige described the film as "a very youth-oriented, focused and cast movie" compared to the Fox films. The following April, Schreier's frequent collaborators Joanna Calo and Lee Sung Jin were confirmed to be writing a new draft of the script after the trio previously worked together on Thunderbolts*. Casting was underway by May 2026, with Samara Weaving first being attached to play Emma Frost in July. In early August, Kit Connor was cast as Scott Summers / Cyclops, and Sadie Sink was confirmed to be reprising her role as Jean Grey from the MCU film Spider-Man: Brand New Day. That same month at Disney's D23 Expo, Christopher Abbott, Inde Navarrette, Maya Boyd, and Adam Driver were officially announced to portray Charles Xavier / Professor X, Rogue, Ororo Munroe / Storm, and Nathaniel Milbury / Mister Sinister, respectively. In September, it was reported that Asa Germann was in talks to portray Warren Worthington III / Angel in the film. In October, Peter Claffey was reported to have been cast as Hank McCoy / Beast in the film. In November, it was reported that Ben Wang was in talks to portray Bobby Drake / Iceman. The film is scheduled to release on May 5, 2028.

=== Supporting roles ===
Several actors and characters from 20th Century Fox's X-Men films appear in supporting roles throughout the MCU's "Multiverse Saga", which connects said franchises together using the concept of a multiverse. In WandaVision (2021) and Agatha All Along (2024), Evan Peters plays a civilian named Ralph Bohner who is dispatched by Agatha Harkness and poses as Pietro Maximoff, the deceased twin brother of Wanda (Elizabeth Olsen) to draw her out and expose her nature as the Scarlet Witch. Peters' character directly homages his role as Peter Maximoff in the Fox films. Patrick Stewart appears as a variant of Charles Xavier from Earth-838 in Doctor Strange in the Multiverse of Madness (2022), who is a founder and councilor of the Illuminati present at the trial for Earth-616's Stephen Strange. A variant of Hank McCoy / Beast portrayed by Kelsey Grammer makes a cameo appearance in a mid-credits scene in The Marvels (2023). Both actors will reprise their roles with their X-Men co-stars Ian McKellen, James Marsden, Rebecca Romijn, and Alan Cumming for the forthcoming Avengers: Doomsday (2026), which will additionally feature Channing Tatum as his iteration of Remy LeBeau / Gambit returning from Deadpool & Wolverine (2024). Doomsday also marked Patrick Stewart's final on-screen performance before his death in October 2026.

Sadie Sink was introduced as the MCU's iteration of Jean Grey in Phase Six of the franchise, serving as the primary antagonist of the film Spider-Man: Brand New Day (2026). Sink is expected to reprise the role in the ensemble film Avengers: Secret Wars (2027). The MCU's incarnation of Ororo Munroe / Storm is expected to appear as a supporting character in Black Panther III (2028), with Maya Boyd cast in the role for the forthcoming X-Men film earlier that year.

== Recurring cast and characters ==
List indicators

This section includes characters who will appear or have appeared in more than two films in the series.

- An empty grey cell indicates the character was not in the film, or that the character's official presence has not yet been confirmed.
- ^{C} indicates a cameo role.
- ^{O} indicates an older version of the character.
- ^{V} indicates a voice-only role.
- ^{Y} indicates a younger version of the character.

Character	X-Men film series													Marvel Cinematic Universe						
Character	Original trilogy films			Wolverine trilogy films			Prequel films				Deadpool films		Spin-off film	Phase Four	Phase Five		Phase Six			Phase Seven
Character	X-Men	X2	X-Men: The Last Stand	X-Men Origins: Wolverine	The Wolverine	Logan	X-Men: First Class	X-Men: Days of Future Past	X-Men: Apocalypse	Dark Phoenix	Deadpool	Deadpool 2	The New Mutants	Doctor Strange in the Multiverse of Madness	The Marvels	Deadpool & Wolverine	Spider-Man: Brand New Day	Avengers: Doomsday	Avengers: Secret Wars	Untitled X-Men film
Character	2000	2003	2006	2009	2013	2017	2011	2014	2016	2019	2016	2018	2020	2022	2023	2024	2026		2027	2028
John Allerdyce Pyro	Alexander Burton^{C}	Aaron Stanford	Aaron Stanford													Aaron Stanford				
Elizabeth "Betsy" Braddock Psylocke			Meiling Melançon						Olivia Munn							Ayesha Hussain				
Caliban						Stephen Merchant			Tómas Lemarquis											
Roberto "Bobby" da Costa Sunspot								Adan Canto					Henry Zaga							
Victor Creed Sabretooth	Tyler Mane			Liev Schreiber Michael-James Olsen^{Y}												Tyler Mane				
Raven Darkhölme Mystique	Rebecca Romijn	Rebecca Romijn	Rebecca Romijn				Jennifer Lawrence Morgan Lily^{Y} Rebecca Romijn^{O}	Jennifer Lawrence	Jennifer Lawrence	Jennifer Lawrence								Rebecca Romijn		
Robert Louis "Bobby" Drake Iceman	Shawn Ashmore	Shawn Ashmore	Shawn Ashmore					Shawn Ashmore												
Frederick J. "Fred" Dukes Blob				Kevin Durand					"Giant" Gustav Claude Ouimet							Mike Waters				
Clarice Fong Blink								Fan Bingbing												
Dr. Jean Grey Phoenix / Dark Phoenix	Famke Janssen	Famke Janssen	Famke Janssen Haley Ramm^{Y}		Famke Janssen			Famke Janssen	Sophie Turner	Sophie Turner Summer Fontana^{Y}							Sadie Sink		Sadie Sink	Sadie Sink
James "Logan" Howlett Wolverine	Hugh Jackman	Hugh Jackman	Hugh Jackman	Hugh Jackman Troye Sivan^{Y}	Hugh Jackman	Hugh Jackman	Hugh Jackman	Hugh Jackman^{C}	Hugh Jackman	Hugh Jackman^{C}		Hugh Jackman^{C}				Hugh Jackman (Note: Jackman portrays several alternate versions of the character in Deadpool & Wolverine (2024).) Henry Cavill^{C}				
Laura Kinney X-23						Dafne Keen										Dafne Keen				
Remy LeBeau Gambit				Taylor Kitsch												Channing Tatum		Channing Tatum		
Jubilation Lee Jubilee	Katrina Florence^{C}	Kea Wong^{C}	Kea Wong^{C}						Lana Condor											
Erik Lehnsherr Magneto	Ian McKellen Brett Morris^{Y}	Ian McKellen	Ian McKellen			Ian McKellen^{C}	Michael Fassbender Bill Milner^{Y}	Ian McKellen^{O} Michael Fassbender^{Y}	Michael Fassbender	Michael Fassbender								Ian McKellen		
Dr. Moira "Moira X" MacTaggert			Olivia Williams				Rose Byrne		Rose Byrne											
Cain Marko Juggernaut			Vinnie Jones									Ryan Reynolds David Leitch				Aaron W. Reed				
Marie D'Ancanto Rogue	Anna Paquin	Anna Paquin	Anna Paquin					Anna Paquin												Inde Navarrette
Peter Maximoff Quicksilver								Evan Peters	Evan Peters	Evan Peters		Evan Peters^{C}								
Dr. Henry "Hank" McCoy Beast		Steve Bacic	Kelsey Grammer				Nicholas Hoult	Nicholas Hoult Kelsey Grammer^{O}	Nicholas Hoult	Nicholas Hoult		Nicholas Hoult^{C}			Kelsey Grammer			Kelsey Grammer		
Nathaniel Milbury Mister Sinister																				Adam Driver
Ororo Munroe Storm	Halle Berry	Halle Berry	Halle Berry					Halle Berry	Alexandra Shipp	Alexandra Shipp		Alexandra Shipp^{C}								Maya Boyd
En Sabah Nur Apocalypse									Oscar Isaac Berdj Garabedian^{O} Brendan Pedder^{Y}											
Katherine Anne "Kitty" Pryde Shadowcat	Sumela Kay	Katie Stuart	Elliot Page					Elliot Page												
Piotr "Peter" Rasputin Colossus	Donald Mackinnon^{C}	Daniel Cudmore	Daniel Cudmore					Daniel Cudmore			Stefan Kapičić^{V}	Stefan Kapičić^{V}				Stefan Kapičić^{V}				
Jason Stryker Mutant 143		Michael Reid McKay		Uncredited actor																
William Stryker II		Brian Cox		Danny Huston				Josh Helman	Josh Helman											
Alexander "Alex" Summers Havok							Lucas Till	Lucas Till	Lucas Till											
Scott Summers Cyclops	James Marsden	James Marsden	Tim Pocock				James Marsden	Tye Sheridan	Tye Sheridan		Tye Sheridan^{C}						James Marsden			Kit Connor
Kurt Wagner Nightcrawler		Alan Cumming							Kodi Smit-McPhee	Kodi Smit-McPhee		Kodi Smit-McPhee^{C}					Alan Cumming			
Wade Wilson Deadpool				Ryan Reynolds							Ryan Reynolds	Ryan Reynolds				Ryan Reynolds				
Warren Worthington III Angel / Archangel			Ben Foster Cayden Boyd^{Y}						Ben Hardy											Asa Germann
Charles Xavier Professor X	Patrick Stewart	Patrick Stewart	Patrick Stewart	Patrick Stewart	Patrick Stewart	Patrick Stewart	James McAvoy Laurence Belcher^{Y}	James McAvoy Patrick Stewart^{O}	James McAvoy	James McAvoy		James McAvoy^{C}		Patrick Stewart			Patrick Stewart			Christopher Abbott
Yukio					Rila Fukushima							Shioli Kutsuna				Shioli Kutsuna				

== Additional details ==
Crew	X-Men film series							Marvel Cinematic Universe
Crew	X-Men	X2	X-Men: The Last Stand	X-Men: First Class	X-Men: Days of Future Past	X-Men: Apocalypse	Dark Phoenix	Untitled X-Men film
Crew	2000	2003	2006	2011	2014	2016	2019	2028
Director	Bryan Singer	Bryan Singer	Brett Ratner	Matthew Vaughn	Bryan Singer	Bryan Singer	Simon Kinberg	Jake Schreier
Producer(s)	Lauren Shuler Donner; Ralph Winter	Lauren Shuler Donner; Ralph Winter	Lauren Shuler Donner; Ralph Winter; Avi Arad	Lauren Shuler Donner; Bryan Singer; Simon Kinberg; Gregory Goodman	Lauren Shuler Donner; Bryan Singer; Simon Kinberg; Hutch Parker		Lauren Shuler Donner; Simon Kinberg; Hutch Parker; Todd Hallowell	Kevin Feige
Screenwriter(s)	David Hayter	Michael Dougherty; Dan Harris; David Hayter	Simon Kinberg; Zak Penn	Ashley Edward Miller; Zack Stentz; Jane Goldman; Matthew Vaughn	Simon Kinberg	Simon Kinberg	Simon Kinberg	Joanna Calo; Lee Sung Jin; Michael Lesslie
Story by	Tom DeSanto; Bryan Singer	Zak Penn; David Hayter; Bryan Singer	Simon Kinberg; Zak Penn	Sheldon Turner; Bryan Singer	Jane Goldman; Simon Kinberg; Matthew Vaughn	Bryan Singer, Simon Kinberg; Michael Dougherty; Dan Harris	Simon Kinberg	
Composer(s)	Michael Kamen	John Ottman	John Powell	Henry Jackman	John Ottman	John Ottman	Hans Zimmer	
Director of photography	Newton Thomas Sigel	Newton Thomas Sigel	Dante Spinotti	John Mathieson	Newton Thomas Sigel	Newton Thomas Sigel	Mauro Fiore	Pat Scola
Editor(s)	Steven Rosenblum; Kevin Stitt; John Wright	John Ottman; Elliot Graham	Mark Helfrich; Mark Goldblatt; Julia Wong	Lee Smith; Eddie Hamilton	John Ottman	John Ottman; Michael Louis Hill	Lee Smith	
Production Designer(s)	John Myhre	Guy Hendrix Dyas	Ed Verreaux	Chris Seagers	John Myhre	Grant Major	Claude Pare	
Costume Designer(s)	Louise Mingenbach	Louise Mingenbach	Judianna Makovsky	Sammy Sheldon Differ	Louise Mingenbach	Louise Mingenbach	Daniel Orlandi	
Distributor(s)	20th Century Fox							Walt Disney Studios Motion Pictures
Running time	104 minutes	133 minutes	104 minutes	132 minutes	131 minutes	144 minutes	114 minutes	
Budget	$75 million	$110–125 million	$210 million	$140–160 million	$200–205 million	$178 million	$200 million	

== Reception ==
=== Box office performance ===
Film	U.S. release date	Box office gross			Production budget	Ref(s)
Film	U.S. release date	U.S. and Canada	Other territories	Worldwide	Production budget	Ref(s)
X-Men	July 14, 2000	$157,299,718	$139,039,810	$296,339,528	$75 million	
X2	May 2, 2003	$214,949,694	$192,761,855	$407,711,549	$110 million	
X-Men: The Last Stand	May 26, 2006	$234,362,462	$226,072,829	$460,435,291	$210 million	
X-Men: First Class	June 3, 2011	$146,408,305	$206,208,385	$352,616,690	$160 million	
X-Men: Days of Future Past	May 23, 2014	$233,921,534	$512,124,166	$746,045,700	$205 million	
X-Men: Apocalypse	May 27, 2016	$155,442,489	$388,491,616	$543,934,105	$178 million	
Dark Phoenix	June 7, 2019	$65,845,974	$186,597,000	$252,442,974	$200 million	
Total		$1,208,230,176	$1,851,295,661	$3,059,525,837	$1.138 billion	

=== Critical and public response ===
Critical and public response to X-Men in film
Film	Critical		Public
Film	Rotten Tomatoes	Metacritic	CinemaScore
X-Men	82% (176 reviews)	64 (33 reviews)	A−
X2	85% (249 reviews)	68 (37 reviews)	A
X-Men: The Last Stand	56% (235 reviews)	58 (38 reviews)	A−
X-Men: First Class	86% (294 reviews)	65 (38 reviews)	B+
X-Men: Days of Future Past	90% (328 reviews)	75 (44 reviews)	A
X-Men: Apocalypse	47% (345 reviews)	52 (48 reviews)	A−
Dark Phoenix	22% (385 reviews)	43 (52 reviews)	B−
