= Maya Boyd =

American actress (born 2002)

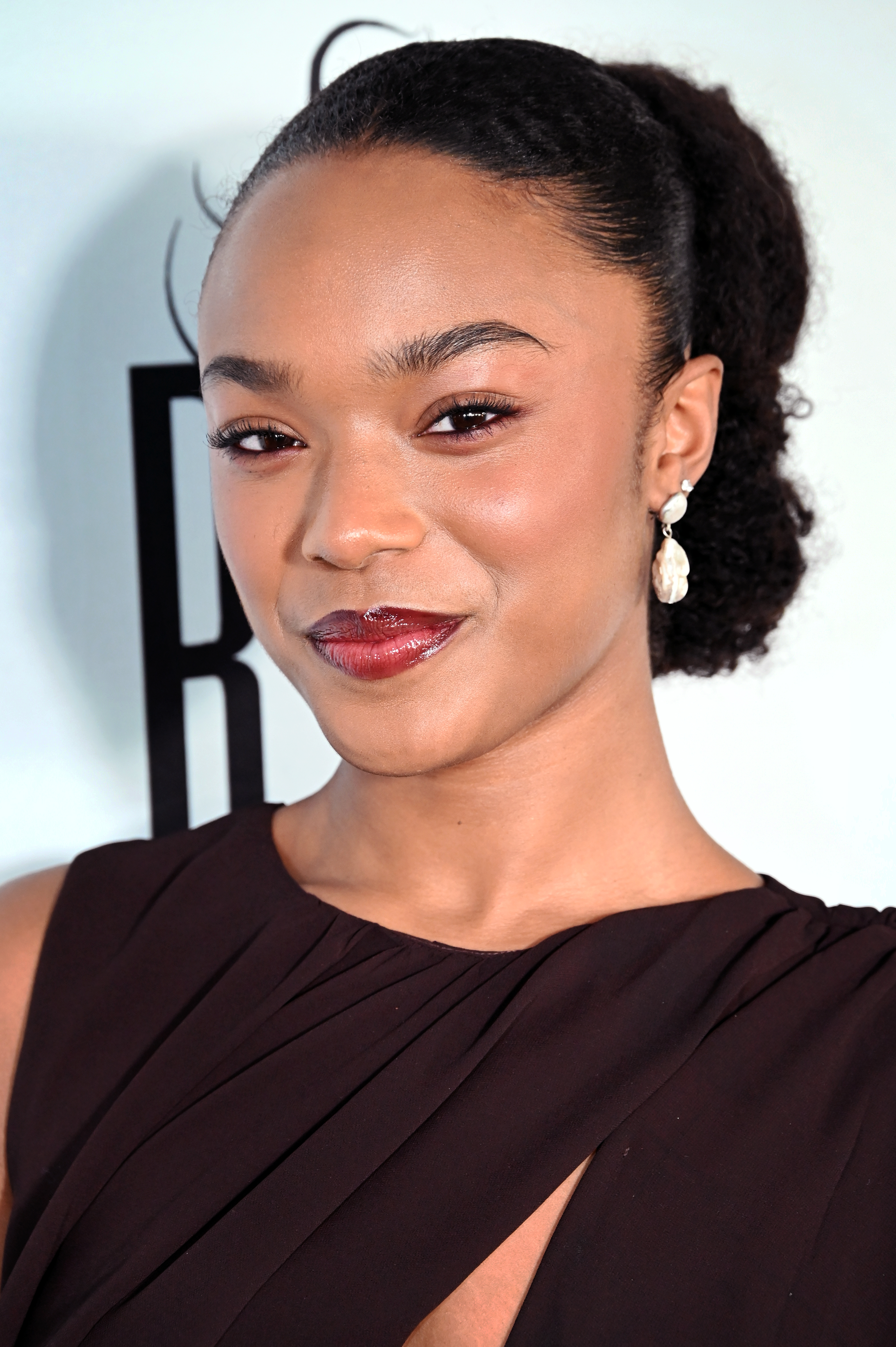
- Boyd in 2026
- Born: Maya Simone Boyd; November 26, 2002 (age 23); Ann Arbor, Michigan, U.S.
- Education: University of Michigan (BA)
- Occupation: Actress
- Years active: 2023–present

Maya Simone Boyd (born November 26, 2002) is an American actress. She began her career performing on Broadway while completing her senior year at the University of Michigan in 2023. In August 2026, she was cast to play Ororo Munroe / Storm in the Marvel Cinematic Universe.

== Career ==
Boyd attended the University of Michigan and earned a Bachelor of Fine Arts in musical theatre. She made her Broadway debut her in Merrily We Roll Along and later played Juliet Capulet in the Broadway production of & Juliet. In February 2026 she was cast as Molly Cunningham in August Wilson's Joe Turner's Come and Gone directed by Debbie Allen.

In August 2026, it was announced that Boyd had been cast to play Ororo Munroe / Storm in an untitled X-Men reboot, which has a planned 2028 release, her feature film debut.

== Filmography ==
=== Stage ===
Year	Title	Role	Venue
2023–2024	Merrily We Roll Along	Mimi from Paramount / Make-up Artist / Gussie	Hudson Theatre
2024–2025	& Juliet	Juliet Capulet	Stephen Sondheim Theatre
2026	Joe Turner's Come and Gone	Molly Cunningham	Ethel Barrymore Theatre
