= Logan (film character) =

X-Men film series character

- X-Men film series and Marvel Cinematic Universe character
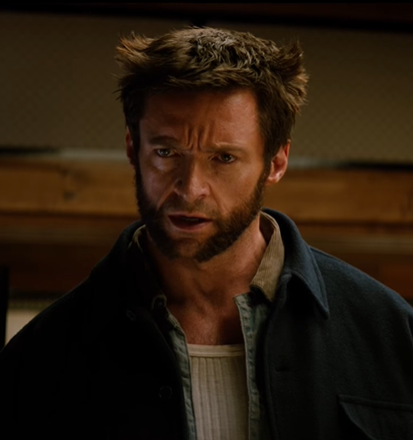
- Logan as portrayed by Hugh Jackman in The Wolverine (2013)
- First appearance: X-Men (2000)
- Last appearance: Logan (2017)
- Based on: Wolverine by: Len Wein; John Romita Sr.
- Adapted by: Bryan Singer; Tom DeSanto
- Portrayed by: Hugh Jackman; Troye Sivan (young; X-Men Origins: Wolverine)
- Voiced by: Mark Hamill (X2: Wolverine's Revenge); Hugh Jackman (X-Men: The Official Game, X-Men Origins: Wolverine)

In-universe information
- Full name: James Howlett
- Species: Human mutant
- Titles: Wolverine; Weapon X
- Occupation: Soldier; Lumberjack; X-Man; History teacher; Limo driver
- Affiliation: Team X; United States Armed Forces; Weapon Plus; Weapon X; X-Men
- Family: Thomas Logan (biological father); Elizabeth Howlett (mother); John Howlett (stepfather); Victor Creed (half-brother); X-24 (clone); Laura (biological daughter)
- Significant others: Kayla Silverfox (fiancée); Jean Grey; Ororo Munroe; Mariko Yashida
- Nationality: Canadian
- Designation: Weapon X; 45825233-T78 (dog tags)

James Howlett, known as Logan and by his codename Wolverine, is a superhero character who originated as the main protagonist and central figure of 20th Century Fox's X-Men film series, and has appeared in nine films since his introduction in X-Men (2000), including both ensemble and solo films. He is portrayed by Hugh Jackman and is based on the Marvel Comics character Wolverine, created by Len Wein and John Romita Sr. Jackman later portrayed multiple alternate "variants" of Logan from the multiverse in Deadpool & Wolverine (2024), produced by Marvel Studios and set in the Marvel Cinematic Universe (MCU), with Troye Sivan portraying a young Logan in X-Men Origins: Wolverine (2009).

== Concept, creation, and characterization ==
=== Development ===
Marvel Comics writers and chief editors Gerry Conway and Roy Thomas wrote an X-Men screenplay in 1984 when Orion Pictures held an option on the film rights, but development stalled when Orion began facing financial troubles. Throughout 1989 and 1990, Stan Lee and Chris Claremont were in discussions with Carolco Pictures for an X-Men film adaptation, with James Cameron as producer and Kathryn Bigelow directing. A story treatment was written by Bigelow, with Bob Hoskins being considered for Wolverine and Angela Bassett being considered for the role of Storm. The deal fell apart when Stan Lee piqued Cameron's interest in a Spider-Man film. Carolco went bankrupt, and the film rights reverted to Marvel. In December 1992, Marvel discussed selling the property to Columbia Pictures to no avail. Meanwhile, Avi Arad produced the animated X-Men TV series for Fox Kids. 20th Century Fox was impressed by the success of the TV show, and producer Lauren Shuler Donner purchased the film rights for them in 1994, bringing Andrew Kevin Walker to write the script.

Walker's draft involved Professor Xavier recruiting Wolverine into the X-Men, which consists of Cyclops, Jean Grey, Iceman, Beast, and Angel. The Brotherhood of Mutants, which consisted of Magneto, Sabretooth, Toad, Juggernaut and the Blob, try to conquer New York City, while Henry Peter Gyrich and Bolivar Trask attack the X-Men with three 8-foot (2.4 m) tall Sentinels. The script focused on the rivalry between Wolverine and Cyclops, as well as the latter's self-doubt as a field leader. Part of the backstory invented for Magneto made him the cause of the Chernobyl disaster. The script also featured the X-Copter and the Danger Room. Walker turned in his second draft in June 1994. Laeta Kalogridis, John Logan, James Schamus, and Joss Whedon were brought on for subsequent rewrites. One of these scripts kept the idea of Magneto turning Manhattan into a "mutant homeland", while another hinged on a romance between Wolverine and Storm. Whedon's draft featured the Danger Room, and concluded with Jean Grey dressed as the Phoenix. According to Entertainment Weekly, this screenplay was rejected because of its "quick-witted pop culture-referencing tone", and the finished film contained only two dialogue exchanges that Whedon had contributed. Michael Chabon pitched a six-page film treatment to Fox in 1996. It focused heavily on character development between Wolverine and Jubilee and included Professor X, Cyclops, Jean Grey, Nightcrawler, Beast, Iceman, and Storm. Under Chabon's plan, the villains would not have been introduced until the second film.

=== Casting ===
Jackman as Logan showing his full height of 6 feet 3 inches (191 cm), compared to the comic book depiction of Logan, which is about 5 feet 3 inches (160 cm).

Many actors were considered for playing the part of Wolverine in a film adaptation of X-Men. Viggo Mortensen was offered the role but turned it down as it conflicted with another role he was scheduled for. At one point in the 1990s, Glenn Danzig was approached for the role due to a slight resemblance, however, Danzig declined as the shooting would interfere with his band's nine-month tour. Bryan Singer spoke to a number of actors, including Russell Crowe, Keanu Reeves and Edward Norton, for the role. Fox ruled out Mel Gibson as being too expensive. Dougray Scott was cast but was forced to drop out due to scheduling conflicts with Mission: Impossible 2 and was injured in a motorbike accident, after which the role went to Hugh Jackman on Crowe's recommendation. Despite what was thought to be a highly controversial move due to his much taller stature than Wolverine's comic depictions by a full foot of height, Jackman's actual performance was well received; Wolverine's original depiction is said to be 5 feet 3 inches (160 cm), while Jackman stands at 6 feet 3 inches (191 cm).

While possessing all the same powers as his comic book counterpart, this portrayal is shown to have a much more powerful healing factor, able to mend and regenerate any damage or lost anatomy (short of decapitation) within seconds, immune to any illness or contamination, and also rendering him ageless, being nearly twice as old as in the comics while still in his prime. Jackman revealed in an interview with The Huffington Post that his character was originally going to have a cameo in Spider-Man, but the costume could not be obtained.

Casting directors cast Troye Sivan as the young James Howlett in X-Men Origins: Wolverine (2009) after seeing him sing at the Channel Seven Perth Telethon, and he was accepted after sending in an audition tape. Kodi Smit-McPhee was originally cast in the role, when filming was originally beginning in December 2007, but he opted out to film The Road. McPhee later played Nightcrawler in X-Men: Apocalypse and Dark Phoenix.

=== Characterization ===
==== Personality ====
Relying on his senses and his instincts to get him around, Logan's personality comes in ranking as an ISTP according to the Myers–Briggs Type Indicator. His personage has been reviewed as a 'loner', often taking leave from the X-Men to deal with personal issues or problems. He is often irreverent and rebellious towards authority figures, although he is a reliable ally and capable leader, and has occasionally displayed a wry, sarcastic sense of humor. The character in the film had few lines, but much emotion to convey in them thus, Jackman watched Clint Eastwood in the Dirty Harry movies and Mel Gibson in Mad Max 2 as inspirations.

==== Appearance ====
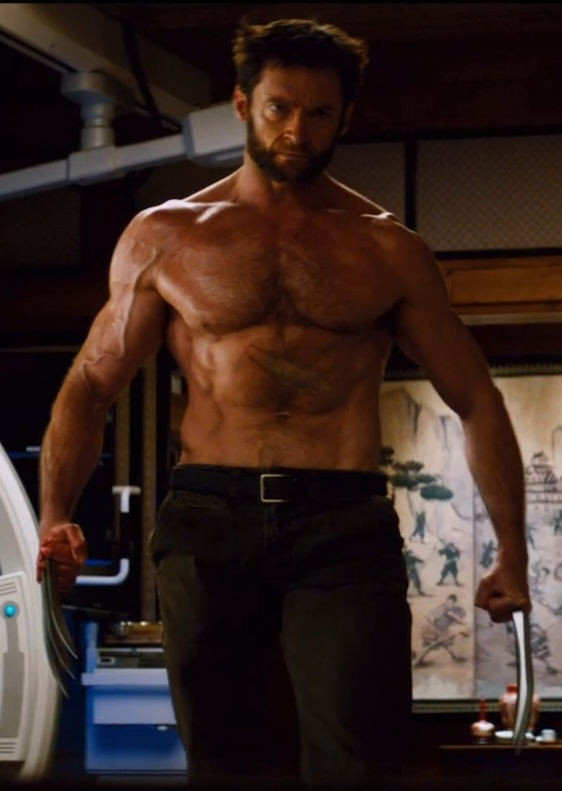
Jackman shirtless as Logan in The Wolverine (2013), commonly recognized as having established the character as a sex symbol.

The casting of Jackman was initially met with criticism upon its announcement, as he was considered too tall and good-looking to play the "short and somewhat feral Canadian". Jackman, at six feet three inches (1.9 m), stands one foot (30 cm) taller than Wolverine who is said in the original comic book to be five feet three inches (1.6 m). Hence, the filmmakers were frequently forced to shoot Jackman at unusual angles or only from the waist up to make him appear shorter than his actual stature, while his co-stars wore platform soles. Jackman was also required to add a great deal of muscle for the role, and in preparing for the films, he underwent a strict diet and exercise regimen. The scenes in the franchise in which Logan appears shirtless, in particular X-Men Origins: Wolverine (2009), have been widely noted by Jackman as the primary reason the character was established as a sex symbol. For the film, Jackman underwent a high-intensity weight training regimen to improve his physique for the role. He altered the program to shock his body into change and also performed cardiovascular workouts. Jackman noted that no digital touches were applied to his physique in a shot of him rising naked from the tank within which Logan has his bones infused with adamantium.

Speaking on why the classic comic book costume of Wolverine has never been worn onscreen, the director James Mangold believed the yellow costume has never made sense in any X-Men movie and seemed out of character, stating, 'Finding the rationale for a uniform when the character disdains self-promotion, why he would put on some outfit that promotes himself as some kind of hero? The flesh and blood character is very loyal to that iconoclastic rebel who doesn't seem to be the first to don spandex. [...] who puts a special branded outfit on when they do good deeds? And why? The only reason you do it is so you can have some sort of trademarked claim and get credit for what you did. Nothing seems less Wolverine-like than the desire to put on a trademarked outfit, particularly canary yellow, [...] Essentially, it's something that lives on the page and I'm not sure could live anywhere else.' Deadpool & Wolverine (2024) marked the first time Jackman had worn a comics-accurate suit on-screen, with Jackman stating that he was surprised he had gone so long filming without ever having worn it once, stating "it looks so good, it feels so good."

=== Marvel Cinematic Universe ===
During an appearance on The Dr. Oz Show in May 2015, Jackman stated that Logan (2017) would be his final portrayal as the character; he said, "This will be my last one, it is my last time. It just felt like it was the right time to do it, and let's be honest, 17 years. I never thought in a million years it would last, so I'm so grateful to the fans for the opportunity of playing it. I kind of have in my head what we're going to do in this last one. It just feels like this is the perfect way to go out." Jackman has also explained that Jerry Seinfeld has convinced him to quit the role stating, "He said to me, when you're creating something it's very important not to run yourself dry. It's not about finishing on top, necessarily, but making sure you're, creatively, still got something left, which propels you into the whatever's next."

In December 2016, Ryan Reynolds revealed that he had been trying to convince Jackman to re-sign for a Wolverine and Deadpool crossover film. Urging fans to campaign online, he stated, "I want Deadpool and Wolverine in a movie together. What we're gonna have to do is convince Hugh. If anything, I'm going to need to do what I can to get my internet friends back on board to help rally another cause down the line. Hugh Jackman is one of the best human beings. Part of the reason I want to do a Deadpool/Wolverine movie is not just because I think the two would light the screen on fire but I genuinely love the guy." In January 2017, Reynolds and Jackman spoke about the proposed project; Jackman stated, "I'm hesitating, because I could totally see how that's the perfect fit. But the timing may be wrong." Jackman later stated that he would not reprise the role for a team-up film, specifying, "No, and Ryan is currently sleeping outside my house. [Laughs] Look, if that movie had appeared 10 years ago, probably a different story, but I knew two-and-a-half years ago that this was the last one. The first call I made was to [director James Mangold]. I said, 'Jim, I got one more shot at this,' and as soon as Jim came up with the idea and we worked on it, I was never more excited. But, it feels like the right time. Deadpool, go for it man, do your thing. You don't need me."

Jackman expressed interest in continuing to play Wolverine if the character were brought into the Marvel Cinematic Universe. Jackman elaborated, "If that was on the table when I made my decision, it certainly would have made me pause. That's for sure. Because I always love the idea of him within that dynamic, with the Hulk obviously, with Iron Man but there's a lot of smarter people with MBAs who can't figure that out. You never know. At the moment, honestly, if I really did have them there, I probably wouldn't have said this is the last. It just feels like this is the right time [to leave the character]." Prior to Disney's prospective acquisition of 20th Century Fox's film division, a sequel to Logan, tentatively titled Laura, was confirmed to be in an active state of development, featuring Dafne Keen reprising her role as Laura, Logan's daughter, with Jackman to be featured via archive footage. In July 2021, Jackman posted an image of Wolverine's arm and claws on Instagram, followed by a picture of himself with Marvel Studios head Kevin Feige, setting off speculation that Jackman would return as Wolverine in an upcoming MCU film. However, Jackman later revealed that he was merely sharing fan art and had not foreseen that his post would "break the internet".

On August 14, 2022, Jackman ultimately reached out to Reynolds about wanting to star together, having confirmed he wanted to return after taking a long drive to think about it. At this time, both Reynolds and director Shawn Levy were preparing to meet with Feige and discuss how to proceed with Deadpool 3, given their lack of story ideas, and realized that including Wolverine would solve many of the issues they were coming up against. Jackman had a change of heart, after being content with his decision to retire as Wolverine for several years, and decided that a team-up film with Reynolds "could be so much fun; I'll probably have more fun on that movie than anything I've ever done". Feige initially advised Jackman not to return as to preserve the "greatest ending in history" of Logan that was Wolverine's death, but was convinced otherwise upon learning Jackman would portray a variant of his character. On September 27, 2022, Jackman's involvement was officially announced for Deadpool 3, which would be titled Deadpool & Wolverine.

== Fictional character biography ==
=== Early life ===
James Howlett was born in Northern Alberta, Canada, near Cold Lake (then part of British North America), Earth-10005 (Note: The 2024 film Deadpool & Wolverine gives the name "Earth-10005" to the main reality of 20th Century Fox's X-Men film series.) in 1832. His mutant powers are awakened when, at 13, he stabs his family's groundskeeper, Thomas Logan, for killing his father, a wealthy landowner. Discovering that Logan was in fact his biological father and seeing the revulsion in his mother's eyes over James killing him, he flees. With his half-brother Victor Creed, Howlett spends the next century fighting in numerous wars including the American Civil War, the Great War, and the Second World War. While being held in a Japanese POW camp in 1945, he saves the life of Japanese officer Ichirō Yashida from the bombing of Nagasaki. In 1962, Howlett is approached by Charles Xavier and Erik Lehnsherr, who are recruiting mutants, but Howlett simply responds "Go fuck yourself".

=== Original Earth-10005 variant ===
==== Team X and becoming the Wolverine ====
During the Vietnam War, Creed kills a superior officer for preventing Creed from raping a Vietnamese woman. Howlett defends Creed when he sees angry soldiers surround him, and they are both sentenced to death by firing squad, but survive and are imprisoned. After the war, Howlett becomes a member of a black-ops strike team, "Team X," which is led by Colonel William Stryker and includes Creed as well as Wade Wilson. After staying on the team for a few years, Howlett leaves due to the group's disregard for human life. He starts a new life in Canada under the name "James Logan" with Kayla Silverfox. In 1979, Logan's past catches up to him when Stryker assigns him to the Weapon X project, in which he has adamantium grafted to his bones. Taking the name "Wolverine" after the Algonquian spirit, Kuekuatsheu, Logan works together with Creed to fight and kill Wilson, who has been designated Weapon XI. Stryker shoots Logan in the brain with an adamantium bullet before being arrested. Though Logan survives, his memory is lost, with his only identifying personal effects being his dog tags engraved with "LOGAN."

==== Member of the X-Men ====
In the 2000s, Logan is an amateur cage fighter in Laughlin City, Alberta. There Logan meets Marie D'Ancanto / Rogue, a mutant teenage girl who has run away from home. They are attacked on the road by Victor Creed, now known as Sabretooth and a minion of Magneto. Two of Xavier's students – Cyclops and Storm – arrive and save them. Logan and Rogue are brought to Xavier's mansion and school for mutants in Westchester County, New York. Xavier tells Logan that Magneto appears to have taken an interest in him and asks him to stay while Xavier's mutants, the X-Men, investigate. Rogue enrolls in the school, and visits Logan while he is having a nightmare. Startled, he accidentally stabs her, but she is able to absorb his healing ability to recover. Disturbed by this event, Rogue leaves the school, and Logan finds her on a train and convinces her to return. Before they can leave, Magneto arrives, knocks out Logan and subdues Rogue, revealing it was Rogue who he wants rather than Logan. Learning that Magneto plans to use a machine to "mutate" world leaders meeting at a summit on nearby Ellis Island, Logan and the other X-Men scale the Statue of Liberty, battling and overpowering the Brotherhood of Mutants, with Logan throwing Sabretooth off of the building into the ocean. After helping stop Magneto's plan, Logan is directed by Professor X to an abandoned military base around Alkali Lake that might contain information about his past, taking Cyclops' motorcycle.

Four days later, while stopping on his way to Alkali Lake to refill his gas tank, Logan notices that Sabretooth has been tracking him and attacks him, stopping after noticing he has similar dog tags to his own, and that Sabretooth is not trying to kill him. Offering him a drink, the two drink in a nearby bar, with Sabretooth revealing his fall from the Statue of Liberty to have restored some of his own erased memories, such as of his name being "Victor", of killing babies and old men, and of Logan. They are interrupted by soldiers searching for Victor, who recognizes Logan as "Weapon X". Fighting the soldiers, Logan and Victor are surprised that they show instinctive teamwork side-by-side, but they are eventually brought down. The two wake up restrained on a helicopter, and after apologizing to Logan for their past, having remembered them to be brothers, Victor throws Logan out of it, sacrificing himself to save him. William Stryker then has adamantium bonded to Victor's bones, which fails as he had originally expected, although he is content with one new success story, Lady Deathstrike. Learning of Logan's survival, Stryker expects to see "Wolverine" again.

Three days later after that, Logan returns to Professor X's school for mutants where he encounters Stryker, to which he and the X-Men teams up with Magneto and Mystique to stop him. During a confrontation with Stryker and Lady Deathstrike, Logan regains some of his memory but opts to remain with the X-Men over Stryker's objections, while Stryker is killed when Alkali's base floods after sustaining damage.

One year later, Xavier sends Logan and Storm to investigate the disappearance of Scott Summers at Alkali Lake, but they find only telekinetically floating rocks, Summers' glasses, and an unconscious Jean. Xavier explains to Logan that when Jean sacrificed herself to save them, she freed the "Phoenix", a dark and extremely powerful alternate personality which Xavier had telepathically repressed. Logan is disgusted to learn of this psychic tampering with Jean's mind. Later on, he checks up on her and she awakens suddenly. Jean then starts seducing Logan aggressively, but he notes this behavior as the Phoenix. Logan then discovers that she killed Summers and is not the Jean Grey he once knew. Jean as the Phoenix kills Xavier and joins Magneto, who plans to have mutants loyal to him storm a Worthington Labs facility housed in Alcatraz to destroy a supposed "cure" for mutants. Logan, Storm, and Beast lead the remaining X-Men in challenging the attack, and Logan has Colossus throw him at Magneto to distract him long enough for Beast to inject Magneto with the "cure" and nullify his powers. Army reinforcements arrive and shoot at Jean just as Logan had calmed her down. The Phoenix is awakened by the attack and disintegrates the troops, and begins to destroy Alcatraz and anyone within range of her powers. Logan realizes that only he can stop the Phoenix due to his healing factor and adamantium skeleton. When Logan approaches her, Jean momentarily gains control and begs him to save her, and everyone else, by killing her. Logan fatally stabs Jean, killing the Phoenix, but mourns her death.

==== Isolation ====
Years later, the guilt-ridden Logan lives in isolation in the Yukon. He is located by Yukio, a mutant with the ability to foresee people's deaths, sent by an elderly Ichirō Yashida wanting to repay Logan for being saved during World War II, but Logan refuses to have his healing powers transferred into Yashida. With Yukio at his side, this leads to a series of events where Wolverine protects Ichirō's granddaughter, Mariko Yashida from Ichirō's son, Shingen Yashida. In the course of these events, Logan's healing powers are damaged, his adamantium claws are severed, and he is finally able to let go of his guilt over Jean's death. After finally returning to the United States two years later, Logan finds himself approached by Magneto and a resurrected Professor X while learning of a new threat to all mutants. In a deleted scene, Logan received the yellow costume from the source material in a suitcase.

==== Going back in time ====
By 2023, the world is controlled by Sentinels, which have decimated the mutant race and virtually conquered Earth, forcing the X-Men to seek a new method of combating their threat. Logan's damaged healing factor led to him eventually developing minor wrinkles and a few grey strands of hair. In a deleted scene, at some point, he also started a deep romantic relationship with Storm. Kitty Pryde uses her phasing powers to transfer Logan's mind back in time into his 1973 body to help the younger Xavier and Lehnsherr, as well as Hank McCoy, deter Mystique from assassinating Bolivar Trask, preventing the apocalyptic future from occurring. Once his mission is fulfilled, events from 1973 onward are changed.

=== Revised Earth-10005 variant ===
==== Rewriting history and captured by Weapon X ====
In the revised 1973 timeline, while Logan supposedly served as a bodyguard for the Mafia, his mind was taken over by the consciousness of his future self. While pursuing and capturing Raven in Paris, Logan saw Major William Stryker, triggering traumatic flashbacks. Logan temporarily recovered his consciousness, before his future self reclaimed control. When the original timeline–Logan succeeded in his mission, his consciousness left his body. Logan woke up being rescued from drowning by Raven, disguised as Stryker.

In the 1980s, Logan is eventually captured by Stryker, given an adamantium skeleton and subjected to brutal mental conditioning, leaving him more feral than human. When some of the X-Men are captured by Stryker's men in 1983, Jean, Scott, and Nightcrawler infiltrate Stryker's base and find a cage. Jean senses the human mind inside and releases him so that he can help. After he tears through Stryker's forces, the three mutants find him and Jean telepathically restores some of Logan's human memories before he runs off through a small side-exit into the snow. (Note: Writer Simon Kinberg explained that the character was originally intended to have a larger role in the film to set up his role in Days of Future Past as a teacher, saying "There was always a notion that we wanted Wolverine to be in the movie. We wanted to find a way to feature him in the film, partly because Bryan [Singer] and I love Hugh [Jackman] so much. We love the character, obviously, and he's such a huge part of the franchise. There were a lot of iterations of how Wolverine would enter and exit the movie. There was a version when he was going to come in at the midpoint of the film and be like the drill sergeant for the kids and take over as their leader. And we felt like that stepped on Jennifer Lawrence's role [as Mystique] in the movie and becoming their leader".)

==== Modern day and a better 2023 ====
In 2023, the consciousness of the original timeline's Logan awakes in his body but with no memory of this timeline. He is happy to see Jean, Scott, and Hank alive, as they never died. Over the preceding 40 years, Logan had joined the X-Men, ultimately becoming a history teacher at Xavier's School for Gifted Youngsters.

==== Fall of the X-Men, death, and legacy ====
In a potential future, (Note: Jackman and Logan director James Mangold stated that they deliberately left it ambiguous on whether the film is set in the revised Earth-10005 timeline introduced in Days of Future Past, as they aimed for Logan to be as standalone as possible.) as Logan's healing factor continues to deteriorate from Yashida's draining of it, he falls victim to a genetically engineered anti-mutant virus created by Zander Rice, affecting all the world's mutants to impair their powers and the rate of new mutants being born. This causes Logan to finally age past his prime and suffer from terminal adamantium poisoning. By 2027, the virus also causes Xavier to develop Alzheimer's. Xavier suffers a seizure while in Westchester County, unleashing a psychic attack that kills several hundred people and most of the X-Men, with only Xavier and Logan surviving. Following this, humans begin to hunt mutants down en masse, and Logan and Xavier are branded international fugitives. Logan asks the assistance of Caliban in taking care of Xavier. He and Caliban bring Xavier to an abandoned smelting plant the along the Mexico–United States border. Wanting Xavier and himself to live out their lives in peace, Logan spends his days working as a chauffeur under his birth name in an attempt to raise money to purchase a Sunseeker yacht. He also begins hustling for prescription drugs for Xavier.

By 2029, he is tasked by Transigen's former nurse Gabriela Lopez to escort the 11-year-old Laura to a place in North Dakota called "Eden." Caliban is captured by Transigen's hunters led by Donald Pierce but Logan, Charles, and Laura escape and discover that Laura is Logan's daughter bred from his DNA and has inherited his bone claws and healing factor. After the three accept shelter from the Munson family they helped on the highway, Xavier is killed by a feral clone of Wolverine. Logan and Laura escape and bury Xavier's body near a lake.

Logan and Laura arrive at Eden, a safe haven run by Rictor and former Transigen test subjects. There, Logan learns that the children will make an eight-mile journey across the forest to the Canada–United States border and entrusts Laura to lead before departing on his own. When the children are located and captured, Logan uses a mutant serum provided by Rictor to restore his full strength and healing factor. After the serum wears off, he meets Rice, who reveals himself as the engineer of the mutant decline. In retribution for Rice's actions, he shoots and kills the scientist.

With an overdose of the serum leaving him exhausted, Logan is no match for his clone, who impales Logan with a tree. Laura shoots the clone in the head with an adamantium bullet that Logan had kept with him for years. Logan tells Laura not to become the weapon that she was made to be, and after she tearfully acknowledges him as her father, he dies peacefully in her arms. Laura and the children bury him before continuing the journey across the border. Laura tilts Logan's cross-shaped grave marker onto its side to create an "X", honoring him as the last of the X-Men.

It is later revealed that Logan was Earth-10005's "anchor being", an entity of extreme importance to the timeline, which begins to destabilize after his death. This catches the attention of Paradox, a rogue agent of the Time Variance Authority (TVA). He decides to use the "Time Ripper", a machine that mercy-kills timelines, on Earth-10005. In an attempt to save his reality, Wade Wilson from the revised timeline time travels to find Logan, only to find his adamantium skeleton remains, which he uses to fight off TVA forces.

== Alternate version ==
=== Yellow suit variant ===
Logan
- Marvel Cinematic Universe character
- Logan as portrayed by Hugh Jackman in Deadpool & Wolverine (2024)
- First appearance: Deadpool & Wolverine (2024)
- Based on: Wolverine by: Len Wein; John Romita Sr.
- Adapted by: Ryan Reynolds; Rhett Reese; Paul Wernick; Zeb Wells; Shawn Levy
- Portrayed by: Hugh Jackman

In-universe information
- Full name: James Howlett
- Species: Human mutant
- Title: Wolverine
- Affiliation: "The Resistance"; X-Men
- Family: Laura Kinney / X-23 (alternate daughter)
- Nationality: Canadian

==== Death of the X-Men ====
This version of Logan presumably had a similar origin story to his Earth-10005 counterpart. At some point in his past, this Logan was offered the chance to join the X-Men. He initially turned them down, though he eventually accepted the offer. While on the team, he was presented with a yellow and blue uniform, but refused to wear it as he did not want the X-Men to think he wanted to be a part of the team.

One night, while Logan was out binge-drinking at a bar, the X-Men were killed by a group of mutant-hunting humans. Following this incident, he fell into a depressive spiral, believing he had let his new family down, so he went berserk and murdered many people indiscriminately; both those who killed his fellow mutants, and innocent civilians. His actions desecrated the X-Men's legacy, and led to him being considered the worst Wolverine in the multiverse by the TVA. He deeply misses his teammates and chooses to memorialize them by wearing the uniform at all times under his normal clothes, spending his days depressed and drinking.

==== Alliance with Deadpool ====
Wade Wilson / Deadpool of Earth-10005 is searching for a variant of Wolverine to replace the original version from his timeline, hoping to stop its collapse. He enters Logan's reality and asks him to come back to the TVA headquarters with him. Logan refuses, prompting Wade to take him by force. When they arrive, Agent Paradox explains that finding a new Logan will not stop the deterioration of Earth-10005, while also revealing this Logan's status in his universe. Paradox then prunes Wade and Logan, sending them to the Void. Wade triggers Logan into a fight by reminding him of what he had done, and their fight ends when Wade promises that the TVA could fix Logan's timeline. They, along with Johnny Storm / Human Torch, are captured by the forces of Cassandra Nova, who reveals herself to be the twin sister of Charles Xavier.

After Nova demonstrates her ability to manipulate people's minds, and tricks Wade into thinking he does not matter, Logan and Wade escape her lair and come into contact with "Nicepool", a variant of Wade. Nicepool gives them a car to travel to the borderlands and meet a small resistance who fight against Nova's forces. On the way there, Wade accidentally admits that he is not certain if the TVA can truly fix Logan's timeline. Accusing Wade of lying to him earlier, an enraged Logan insults him and vocally lashes out, causing them to fight in the car until they pass out. They are driven to the borderlands by a now-grown up Laura, the daughter of the original Logan.

Logan wakes up at the resistance base and starts raiding the stash of alcohol. When Wade wakes up, they meet the resistance: Elektra Natchios, Eric Brooks / Blade, Remy LeBeau / Gambit, and Laura. Wade convinces them to help him fight Nova and escape the Void, but Logan refuses to cooperate. However, he changes his mind after a conversation with Laura about his inability to save the X-Men in his universe. Logan and Wade, along with the resistance, confront Nova and her forces. Nova mentally incapacitates Logan, learning about his past, but eventually gets her powers blocked by Wade using Juggernaut's helmet. Logan convinces Wade to remove the helmet, and Nova allows Logan and Wade to escape the Void via a sling ring she acquired from a variant of Doctor Strange and opens a portal back to Earth-10005.

Upon arriving, Logan and Wade find that the "Time Ripper" device is nearly ready, and discover that Paradox is preparing to use it on Wade's timeline without permission from his superior, Hunter B-15. Nova learns of this and arrives to use the Time Ripper to destroy all timelines. She sends the Deadpool Corps, an army of Deadpool variants, to slow Wade and Logan down. Logan, now donning the cowl of his suit, helps Wade battle the Corps, to no avail. The Corps stands down when Wade's friend Peter W. arrives to help. Paradox tells Logan and Wade that to stop Nova, one can disrupt the power flow of the Time Ripper, but at the cost of their life. Using their bodies as conductors, they both join hands and destroy the Time Ripper, killing Nova in the process, and survive by sharing the burden.

As Paradox is arrested, B-15 tells Logan that he can remain on Earth-10005, but instead is asked if his past can be changed. B-15 explains that his past is what made him the hero needed to save the multiverse, and that there is no need to change it. Wade takes him and Laura to meet his friends, where he encourages Wade to reconcile with his ex-girlfriend, Vanessa Carlysle.

=== Other versions ===
- A gambler variant of Logan, who wears an eyepatch and a white tux, dubbed Patch.
- A variant of Logan who has been crucified on a giant X on top of a mountain of skulls, reminiscent of the cover of The Uncanny X-Men #251 (Early November 1989).
- A variant of Logan fighting the Hulk, who is wearing the original brown and tan suit designed by John Byrne.
- A variant of Logan portrayed by Henry Cavill dubbed Cavillrine, referring to a popular Internet fancast on which actor could succeed Jackman.
- A variant of Logan, whose height is closer to the character's comic-accurate height of 5 feet 3 inches (160 cm).
- An Age of Apocalypse variant of Logan with "glam rock-like" hair, one hand, and a black and red costume, named Weapon X in the comics.
- An elderly variant of Logan, based on Old Man Logan.

== References in popular culture ==
=== Other films ===
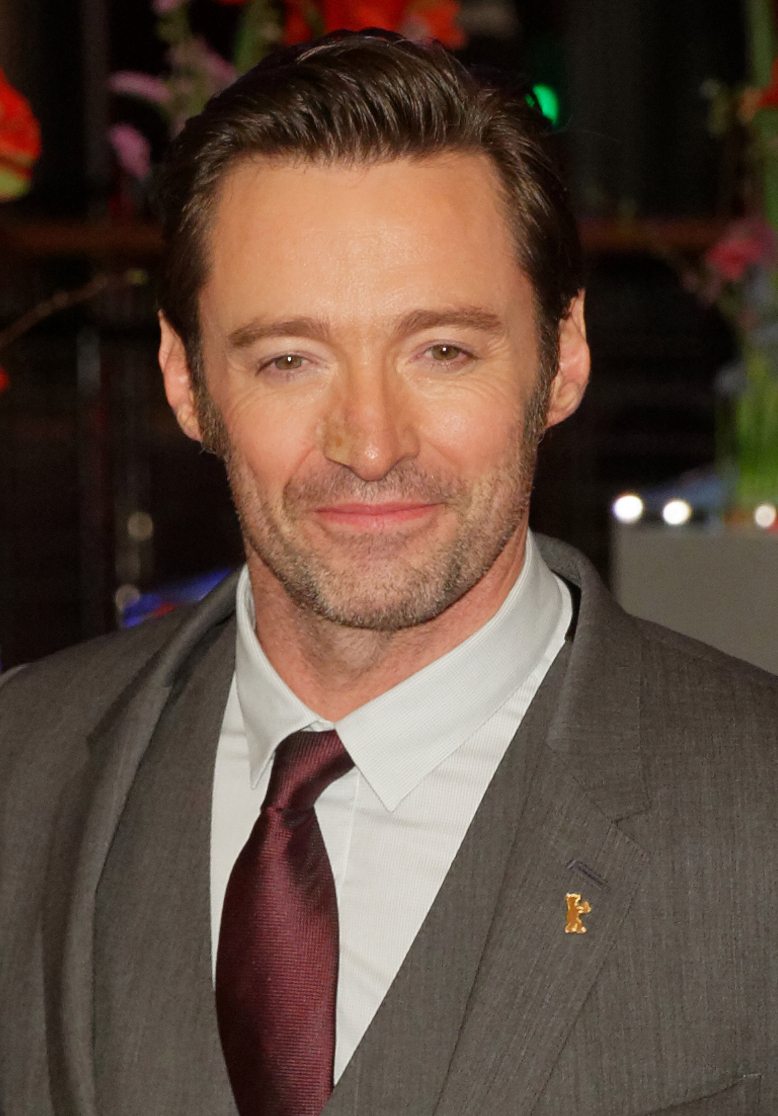
Jackman seen at the Logan (2017) world premiere.

- In an "Extended Cut" of Fantastic Four (2005), Reed Richards changes his face to resemble Jackman's portrayal of Wolverine in an attempt to woo Sue Storm.
- In Flushed Away (2006), Roddy (voiced by Jackman) has a Wolverine costume in his wardrobe.
- Vince Vieluf portrays a jock version of Jackman's Logan in the parody film Epic Movie (2007), spoofing elements of X-Men: The Last Stand (2006).
- Jackman parodies the Logan role in films such as Night at the Museum: Secret of the Tomb (2014) and Me and Earl and the Dying Girl (2015), in addition to playing himself.
- When "The Farmer" is in his "Mr. X" persona in Shaun the Sheep Movie (2015), the poster in which he poses with a hair clipper in each hand is based on the poster for The Wolverine (2013).
- While Logan does not appear in Deadpool (2016), Deadpool refers to both the character and Jackman multiple times, with a mask made from a magazine photograph of Jackman being worn by Deadpool in the film's denouement.
- The opening scene of The Greatest Showman (2017), also starring Jackman, features an Easter egg reference to Logan; in the credits, a character appears with arms crossed and claws extended in each corner of the border.
- The opening scene of Deadpool 2 (2018) features Deadpool holding a music box that depicts Logan's death in Logan. Jackman's image also appears on a cereal box that Deadpool autographs for a young boy. In a post-credits scene, Deadpool time-travels to the emergence of his Weapon XI incarnation and shoots him several times, confusing the bystanding Logan, before time-traveling away.

=== Music videos ===
- The opening scene of a music video for the single "Chk Chk Boom" by the South Korean boy band Stray Kids features Wolverine (portrayed by Hugh Jackman) as a weather presenter on fictional television channel CCB.

=== Video games ===
The video games X2: Wolverine's Revenge, X-Men: The Official Game, and X-Men Origins: Wolverine are based on the X-Men film series for which they are named, the latter two including voice acting by Hugh Jackman as Logan, with the first merely featuring Jackman's likeness with Mark Hamill voicing the character. The first game does not take place in the continuity of the film series, having a closer resemblance to the Marvel Universe instead, while the second game bridges the events of X2 and X-Men: The Last Stand, as Logan mourns Jean Grey and faces a returned Jason Stryker and Lady Deathstrike, who working with Hydra take control of his deceased father's Sentinel to eradicate mutantkind; Logan also faces his brother Victor, who had been bonded with adamantium and mind-wiped by Stryker. The story of the third game is a combination of the backstory explored in the X-Men Origins: Wolverine film and an original plot created by Raven Software using Unreal Engine 3, which was influenced by major events in the X-Men comic series, expanding upon the film's events as Logan recalls the events of X-Men Origins: Wolverine more accurately during the post-apocalyptic future later depicted in X-Men: Days of Future Past.

== Reception and legacy ==
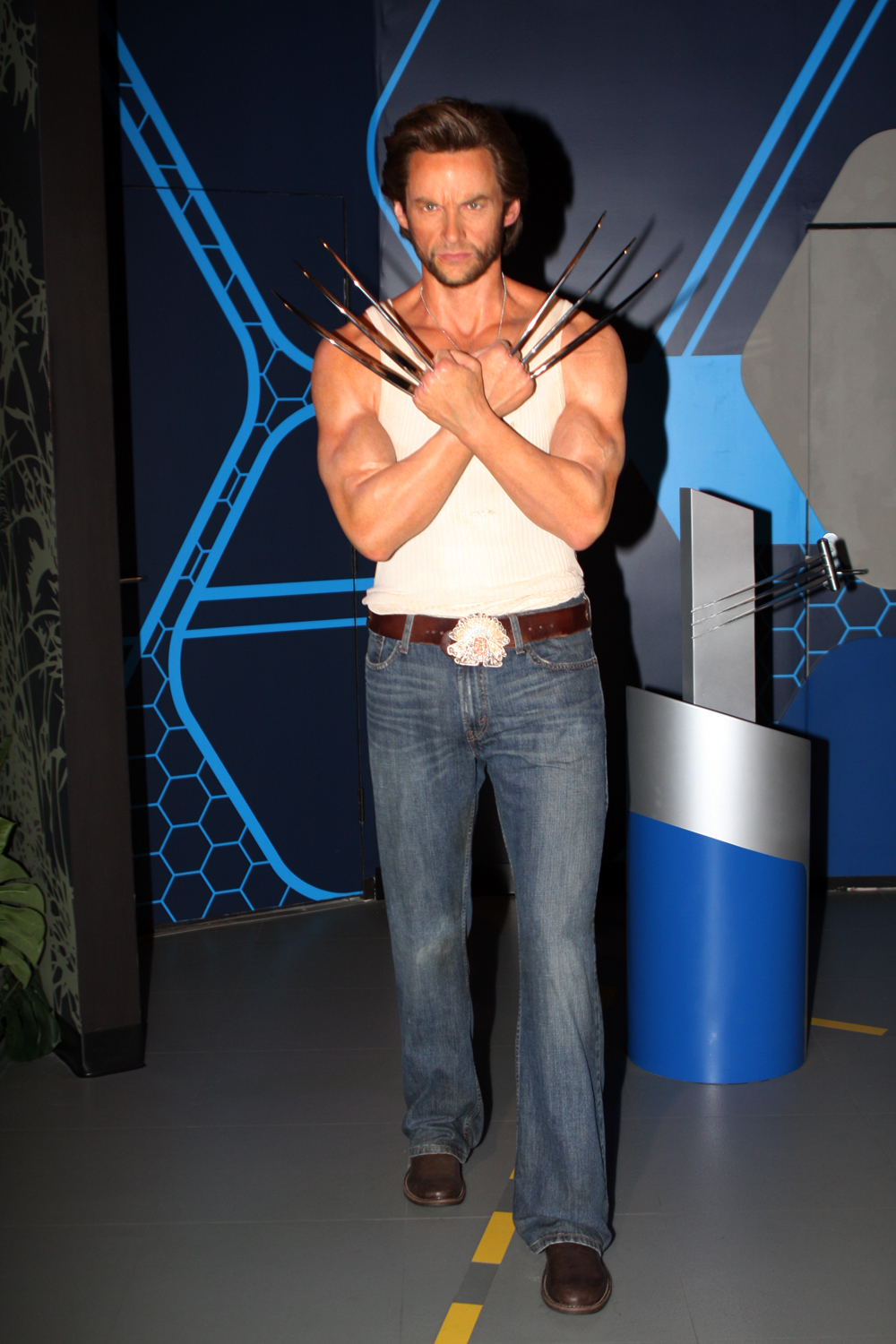
Wax figure of Hugh Jackman as Logan at Madame Tussauds. Performing the role in nine installments of the X-Men film series earned Jackman the Guinness World Record for "longest career as a live-action Marvel character", which he held from 2017 until 2021 alongside Sir Patrick Stewart.

The character from the X-Men film series was well received by critics. Daniel Dockery of Syfy ranked Wolverine first in their "Ranking Every Mutant in the X-Men Film Series" list, writing, "For nearly 20 years, we got to see Wolverine from every angle, and by the end of Logan, the sadness in his demise was truly earned." IndieWire ranked Wolverine 2nd in their "X-Men Movie Mutant Characters From Best To Worst" list. The A.V. Club ranked Wolverine 6th in their "100 best Marvel characters" list. Joe Garza of SlashFilm ranked Wolverine 7th in their "Most Powerful X-Men Characters" list.

Hugh Jackman's portrayal of the character has been praised by multiple critics. Jessica Brajer of MovieWeb stated, "The film that kick-started the X-Men franchise and brought Jackman into the spotlight is the original X-Men. [...] Though Jackman wasn't the first choice for the role, it's clear that he has lived up to the expectations set by comic-book fans everywhere." Liam Gaughan of SlashFilm wrote, "If a new actor is cast as Wolverine in a rebooted X-Men franchise within the Marvel Cinematic Universe, they will have to live up to the legacy that Jackman left behind." Christian Bone of Starburst ranked Jackman's performances through the X-Men films first in their "10 Greatest Performances in the X-Men Movies" list, saying, "Some might complain that Wolverine hogs too much of the spotlight at the expense of other characters, but it's hard to blame the filmmakers for this when Jackman is such a strong leading man. Even now, in our superhero-saturated world, his Wolverine remains unique – a reluctant hero, who struggles to control his own brutality. It's the sort of character you don't really get in the MCU, though he no doubt will be folded into it soon enough. Good luck to the poor sap who has to follow Jackman." Scoot Allan of Comic Book Resources ranked Jackman's performances across the X-Men film series third rd in their "10 Best Performances In The X-Men Movies" list, writing, "Hugh Jackman played the mutant hero and became an instant hit with fans of Wolverine." Jackman's performance topped The Hollywood Reporter's "50 Greatest Superhero Movie Performances of All Time" list.

Playing the role for seventeen years in nine films, Jackman held the Guinness World Record of "longest career as a live-action Marvel superhero" between 2017 and 2021 alongside Sir Patrick Stewart. He was initially believed to have regained the record in 2024 after his appearance in Deadpool & Wolverine, only to lose it again to Wesley Snipes as Blade in the same film.

=== Accolades ===
| Year | Film | Award | Category | Result | Ref. |
|---|---|---|---|---|---|
| 2001 | X-Men | Blockbuster Awards | Favorite Male – Newcomer | Nominated | |
| 2001 | X-Men | Saturn Awards | Best Actor | Won | |
| 2001 | X-Men | MTV Movie Awards | Best On-Screen Duo (with Halle Berry, James Marsden & Anna Paquin) | Nominated | |
| 2001 | X-Men | MTV Movie Awards | Best Breakthrough Performance | Nominated | |
| 2003 | X2 | Teen Choice Awards | Choice Movie Actor: Drama/Action Adventure | Nominated | |
| 2003 | X2 | Teen Choice Awards | Choice Movie Fight/Action Sequence (with Kelly Hu) | Nominated | |
| 2004 | X2 | Empire Awards | Best Actor | Nominated | |
| 2004 | X2 | MTV Movie Awards | Best Movie Fight (with Kelly Hu) | Nominated | |
| 2006 | X-Men: The Last Stand | Teen Choice Awards | Choice Action Movie Actor | Nominated | |
| 2006 | X-Men: The Last Stand | Teen Choice Awards | Choice Movie Liplock (with Famke Janssen) | Nominated | |
| 2006 | X-Men: The Last Stand | Scream Awards | Best Superhero | Nominated | |
| 2006 | X-Men: The Last Stand | Scream Awards | Best Flesh Scene (with Famke Janssen) | Won | |
| 2009 | X-Men Origins: Wolverine | Teen Choice Awards | Choice Movie Actor: Action | Won | |
| 2009 | X-Men Origins: Wolverine | Teen Choice Awards | Choice Movie: Hissy Fit | Nominated | |
| 2009 | X-Men Origins: Wolverine | Teen Choice Awards | Choice Movie: Rumble (with Liev Schreiber & Ryan Reynolds) | Nominated | |
| 2009 | X-Men Origins: Wolverine | Scream Awards | Best Fantasy Actor | Nominated | |
| 2009 | X-Men Origins: Wolverine | Scream Awards | Best Superhero | Won | |
| 2009 | X-Men Origins: Wolverine | Scream Awards | Fight Scene of the Year (with Liev Schreiber & Ryan Reynolds) | Nominated | |
| 2010 | X-Men Origins: Wolverine | MTV Movie Awards | Best Fight (with Liev Schreiber & Ryan Reynolds) | Nominated | |
| 2010 | X-Men Origins: Wolverine | People's Choice Awards | Favorite Action Star | Won | |
| 2010 | X-Men Origins: Wolverine | People's Choice Awards | Favorite On-Screen Team (with Daniel Henney, Dominic Monaghan, Liev Schreiber, Ryan Reynolds & will.i.am) | Nominated | |
| 2011 | X-Men: First Class | Scream Awards | Best Cameo | Won | |
| 2013 | The Wolverine | People's Choice Awards | Favorite Action Movie Actor | Nominated | |
| 2014 | The Wolverine | Kids' Choice Awards | Favorite Male Butt Kicker | Nominated | |
| 2014 | The Wolverine | Empire Awards | Empire Icon Award | Won | |
| 2014 | X-Men: Days of Future Past | People's Choice Awards | Favorite Movie Actor | Nominated | |
| 2015 | X-Men: Days of Future Past | Kids' Choice Awards | Favorite Movie Actor | Nominated | |
| 2015 | X-Men: Days of Future Past | Kids' Choice Awards | Favorite Male Action Star | Nominated | |
| 2016 | X-Men: Apocalypse | Teen Choice Awards | Choice Movie: Hissy Fit | Nominated | |
| 2017 | Logan | MTV Movie & TV Awards | Best Movie Performance | Nominated | |
| 2017 | Logan | MTV Movie & TV Awards | Best Movie Duo (with Dafne Keen) | Won | |
| 2017 | Logan | Teen Choice Awards | Choice Action Movie Actor | Nominated | |
| 2017 | Logan | Teen Choice Awards | Choice Movie: Fight | Nominated | |
| 2017 | Logan | Dublin Film Critics' Circle | Best Actor | 9th place | |
| 2017 | Logan | IGN Awards | Best Lead Performer in a Movie | Nominated | |
| 2018 | Logan | AACTA International Awards | Best Actor | Nominated | |
| 2018 | Logan | Empire Awards | Best Actor | Won | |
| 2018 | Logan | Saturn Awards | Best Actor | Nominated | |
| 2025 | Deadpool & Wolverine | Saturn Awards | Best Supporting Actor in a Film | Won | |
| 2025 | Deadpool & Wolverine | Critics' Choice Super Awards | Best Actor in a Superhero Movie | Won | |
