= Mutant (comics) =

Mutant or Mutants, in comics, may refer to:

== Marvel Comics ==
- Mutant (Marvel Comics), one of the main causes for superhuman characters in Marvel Comics, as well as a number of titles, teams, and characters:
  - Brotherhood of Mutants, also known as the Brotherhood of Evil Mutants, a supervillain team
  - "The Fall of the Mutants", a X-Men storyline
  - Mutant 2099 (Chad Channing), a superhero
  - Mutant Force, a supervillain team, also known as the Resistants
  - Mutant Liberation Front, a supervillain team
  - "Mutant Massacre", a X-Men storyline
  - Mutant Master, a supervillain and member of Factor Three
  - Mutant X (comics), a X-Men title
  - Mutant Zero, a supervillain connected to the Initiative
  - New Mutants, a superhero team that is an offshoot of the X-Men

== DC Comics ==
- Metahuman, the DC Comics counterpart to Marvel Comics' mutants and mutates
- Mutants (DC Comics), a fictional street gang

== Other comics ==
- Mutant (Judge Dredd), a person changed by the radiation from the Atomic Wars
- Mutants in fiction (including comics)
- Teenage Mutant Ninja Turtles, an American media franchise originating from a comic book series

== See also ==
- Mutant (disambiguation)
