= Hank McCoy (film character) =

Character in the X-Men film series

- X-Men film series and Marvel Cinematic Universe character
- Kelsey Grammer as Dr. Henry Philip "Hank" McCoy in X-Men: The Last Stand (2006)
- First appearance: X2 (2003)
- Based on: Beast by: Stan Lee; Jack Kirby
- Adapted by: Simon Kinberg; Zak Penn
- Portrayed by: Steve Bacic (2003; cameo); Kelsey Grammer (2006–present); Nicholas Hoult (2011–19)

In-universe information
- Full name: Dr. Henry Philip "Hank" McCoy
- Alias: Beast
- Species: Human mutant
- Titles: Secretary of Mutant Affairs; Headmaster
- Occupation: United States Ambassador to the United Nations
- Affiliation: U.S. Cabinet; X-Men
- Significant other: Mystique

Dr. Henry Philip "Hank" McCoy is a fictional character portrayed primarily by Kelsey Grammer and Nicholas Hoult in the X-Men film series and later in the Marvel Cinematic Universe (MCU) media franchise, based on the Marvel Comics character of the same name. McCoy is depicted as a mutant who is an ape-like creature with blue fur, fangs and claws, known commonly as Beast.

Working for the U.S. government, McCoy has held the title of Secretary of Mutant Affairs and later became the first mutant ambassador to the United Nations. He helped found the X-Men alongside Charles Xavier, Erik Lensherr and Raven Darkholme with whom he has had a relationship with. McCoy has assisted the team with defeating various supervillains including Sebastian Shaw, Apocalypse, and the Phoenix. An alternate version of McCoy working alongside Binary encounters Monica Rambeau from Earth-616.

The character has appeared throughout various X-Men and MCU films, first appearing with a cameo appearance in X2 (2003). Grammer went on to portray him in X-Men: The Last Stand (2006) and The Marvels (2023). Hoult portrayed a younger version in the prequel films beginning with X-Men: First Class (2011). Both Grammer and Hoult's iterations appeared in X-Men: Days of Future Past (2014) and have received generally positive reviews.

== Development and casting ==
By the late 1990s, production and script writing began on a movie centered around the Marvel Comics superhero team, the X-Men, with filming beginning in 1999 for the film, X-Men (2000). Early drafts for the film featured the character Dr. Hank McCoy / Beast. However, due to budget concerns, 20th Century Fox pushed for his character alongside Pyro to be removed before the film could be greenlighted. Screenwriter David Hayter noted that,

We had $75 million, and we could do Beast for that. But when they went to the Statue of Liberty, I wrote a huge sequence where he's swinging around the interior of the statue and jumping from girder to girder and all this stuff. And [Fox] was like, 'We can't afford that'.

McCoy's narrative function as the team's resident scientist would instead be transferred to Jean Grey in the subsequent rewrites and theatrical film. In 2003, the character would go on to make a cameo appearance in the film's sequel X2 (2003), being depicted as human by Canadian actor, Steve Bacic. The character eventually made a proper screen debut in the franchise's third film, X-Men: The Last Stand (2006), with BBC reporting in June 2005 that he would be portrayed by American actor Kelsey Grammer. By 2007, work began on a prequel to the X-Men film series, originally set to center around Magneto. In 2010, American actor Benjamin Walker was set to star as a younger version of Beast, but turned down the role to star in the Broadway musical Bloody Bloody Andrew Jackson. By October, Variety reported that English actor Nicholas Hoult had signed a three-picture contract with Fox and been cast in the role for the film titled X-Men: First Class (2011). Hoult noted he was a big fan of the comics, citing his work in Clash of the Titans (2010) as honing his skills to star in the film.

== Characterization ==
=== Depiction and portrayal ===
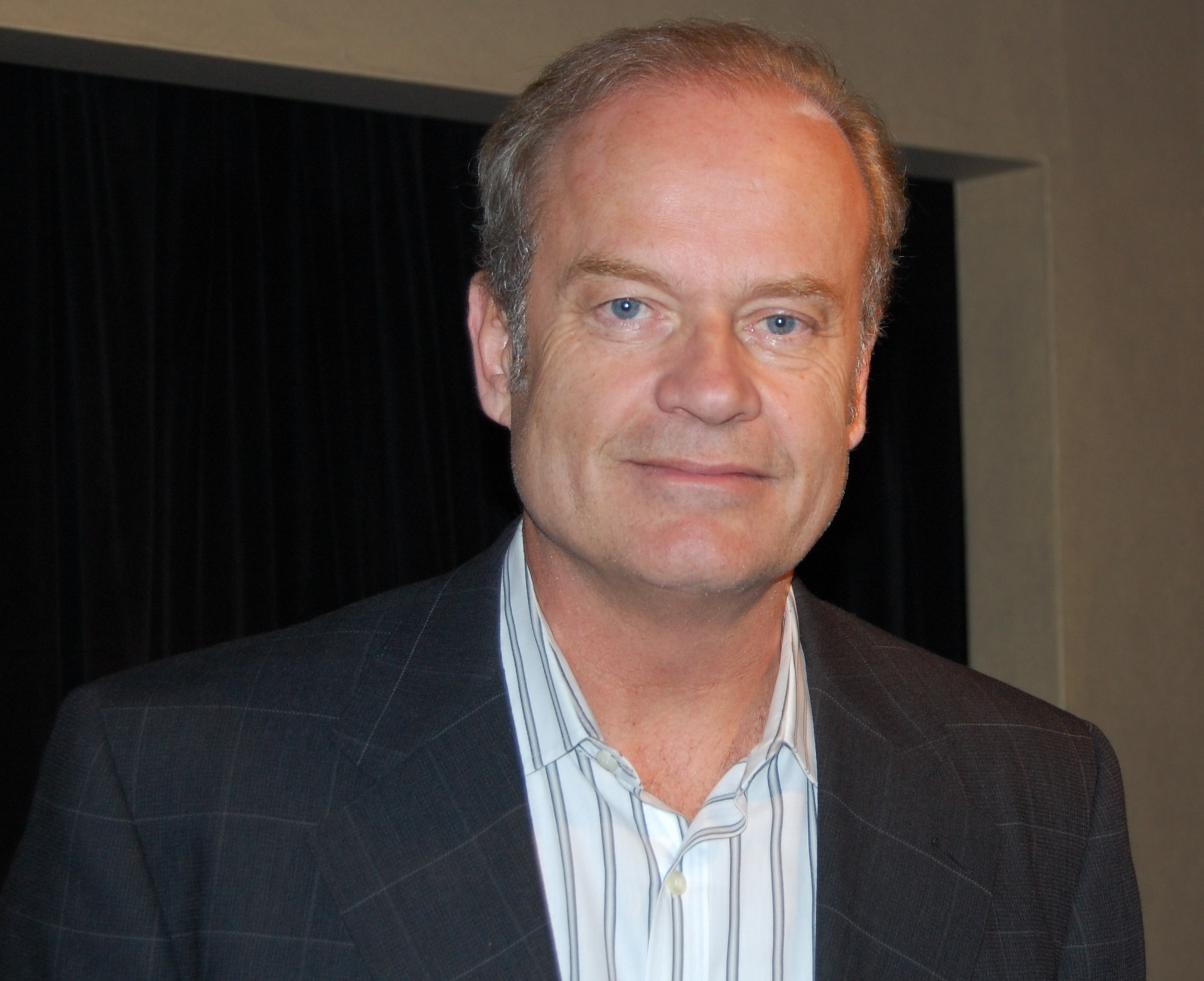

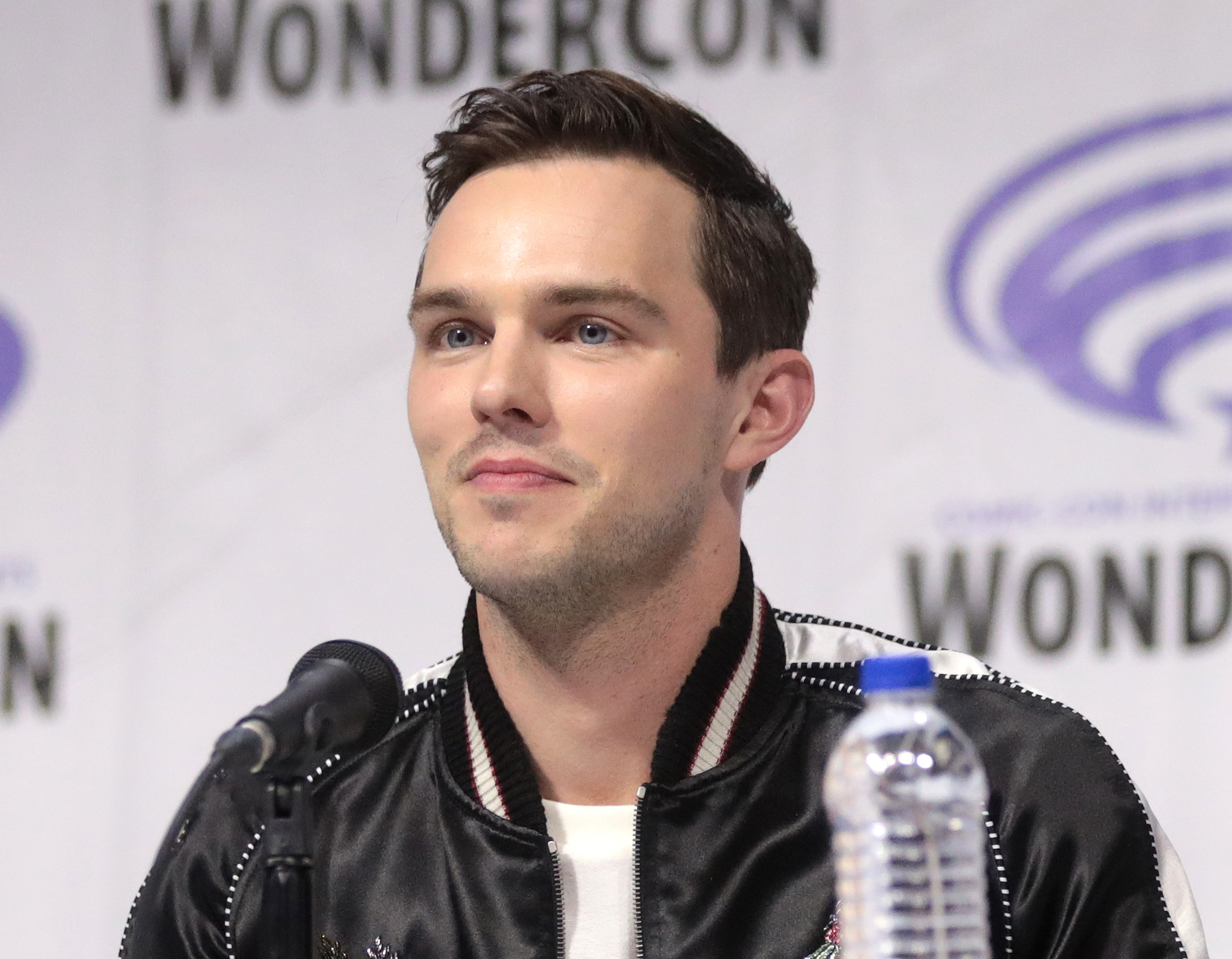
Hank McCoy / Beast has been portrayed by various actors; most notably by American actor Kelsey Grammer (top) and English actor Nicholas Hoult (bottom)

He is a stalwart, upright, serious-minded, decent man [...] I think of him as being the Martin Luther King of the mutants. He's got a dignity and a dream, and is willing to fight for it — but slow to action in terms of fighting. He will always find every way he can not to have to fight.

— Kelsey Grammer on his portrayal of Beast.

The character has appeared in various films as part of the X-Men film series, being portrayed by a variety of actors. (Note: McCoy was first portrayed by Canadian actor, Steve Bacic in a cameo appearance for X2 (2003).) American actor Kelsey Grammer appeared as the character in X-Men: The Last Stand (2006) which saw him working for the United States Government as the Secretary of Mutant Affairs, eventually being made the first Mutant ambassador for the United Nations. Describing his character, Grammer noted that "McCoy has integrated into the political world quite successfully. In his desire to be of service to his fellow mutants and to mankind". He added that the character values diplomacy over resorting to violence. Screen Rant writer Niall Gray opined that Grammer's characterization of the character was "substantial", feeling that his "eloquence paired perfectly with Beast, making the actor seem the best possible choice for the role".

English actor Nicholas Hoult went on to portray a younger version of the character in the prequel film X-Men: First Class (2011) which saw him joining the original X-Men team recruited by Charles Xavier and Erik Lehnsherr. On his role, Hoult called him a "very clever guy, but a little bit shy and awkward", adding that he's also "urbane, witty and a shrewd guy". He called his portrayal different compared to Grammer's, as people are intimidated by him noting that "it's great to have that with the contradiction of the character with somebody who's not that comfortable with himself".

Hoult went on to reprise the role in X-Men: Days of Future Past (2014) which saw Wolverine travelling back from the future to stop Mystique from killing Bolivar Trask. Hoult explained that at this time, McCoy "has created a serum which basically controls his mutation so his appearance is normal as long as he doesn’t get worked up". For promotion for the film, a website was created to show a timeline of the X-Men, which revealed that McCoy was not alive in Wolverine's time, (Note: Set after X-Men: The Last Stand (2006).) and was murdered in 2015 by angry mob of Human Majority protesters. After Wolverine resets the original timeline with the help of the younger McCoy, he returns to the newly formed timeline and greets an older McCoy, portrayed by Grammer in an cameo appearance. Grammer noted in an interview with MTV that he shot his cameo secretly having "had the best time" adding that he would "love to revisit Beast" in the future.

Hoult reprised his role in X-Men: Apocalypse (2016). Producer Simon Kinberg called the film a "close" to the trilogy established in First Class and Days of Future Past, and noted that it "isn't to say we won’t see them in future movies [...] but it’s a completion of an arc for them". The film also marked the end of Hoult's three-picture contract as McCoy with The Hollywood Reporter reporting that if the studio "wants [the cast] to return, they won't come cheap". By 2017, Deadline Hollywood reported that Hoult would return in a film based on The Dark Phoenix Saga. In 2018, Hoult made a cameo appearance in Deadpool 2 (2018), which saw him in a meeting with other X-Men, shutting a door on Wade Wilson when he arrives at the X-Mansion. This was followed by his appearance in the film Dark Phoenix (2019). Speaking on McCoy, Hoult noted that Hank is now a "more senior figure", noting that Kinberg gave him "this beautiful, emotional place to go with the character, to play elements of Hank and Beast that we haven’t seen before".

In 2019, Disney bought the rights to 20th Century Fox, halting any new films for the X-Men film franchise but opened door for the characters to appear in the Disney-owned Marvel Cinematic Universe (MCU). On appearing in the MCU, Hoult expressed his interest, noting that "if there was a way to keep growing within that character then that'd be something [he would] be interested in". That same year, American film composer John Ottman released a script online for Fear The Beast, a solo-film starring Hoult, which was originally offered by himself and his assistant Byron Burton to Fox executives, but politely declined. In 2021, Grammer also expressed interest in reprising his role, saying that "I'd love to do Beast again. Nobody's really talked to me about it [...] I'm assuming that they would go with, you know, the first is the best".

In November 2023, Grammer appeared in the mid-credits scene of the MCU film The Marvels (2023), which saw him portraying an alternate version of Beast. This version of the character works alongside Binary and encounters Monica Rambeau who has fallen into their universe. For the cameo appearance to work out, Grammer was personally called about returning by Feige, leveraging their relationship from when the latter worked on with the former in the X-Men film series. On reprising his role, Grammer noted that he has always wanted to play him again, seeing him "as an extraordinary character, a real character of gravitas and importance in our culture". Hoult also praised Grammer returning to the role, noting that "He was the Beast I saw when I was a kid, along with the other actors that they're bringing back [...] It'll be fun to see how they incorporate those characters into that world". In April 2025, it was announced that Grammer would reprise his role in Avengers: Doomsday (2026).

=== Relationship with Mystique ===
McCoy has had a complex relationship with X-Men member-turned villain Raven Darkholme. Throughout First Class, it is revealed that Darkholme once had a "soft spot" for McCoy, begin to "share their vulnerabilities with each other", and also share a kiss. This relationship was not established in the original X-Men trilogy as it was made prior to First Class, and also depicts Darkholme siding with Magneto and his Brotherhood of Mutants. However, after the character's histories are erased and changed in Days of Future Past, the two retroactively rekindle their relationship. Speaking with MTV, Hoult noted that there were scenes featuring their relationship cut of the theatrical version of Days of Future Past "because they didn't work technically in terms of the geography of how the movie played out in the end", and he hoped that the next film would feature more of them. Kinberg called their relationship "interesting" and regretted "that [they] didn't have a lot of time to explore" their bond. In the Rogue Cut, an extended version of the film, the scenes are restored and shows Darkholme returning the X-Mansion and having a "sexually charged moment" with McCoy. IGN writer Jesse Schedeen felt that in this version of the film, their "relationship was a major focus" and much more successful following on from the bond created in First Class. Hoult also dated Darkholme's actress, Jennifer Lawrence.

=== VFX and costume design ===
In The Last Stand, in an interview with Comic Book Resources, Grammer noted that took up to three hours to get into costume and makeup, and another forty-five minutes to take it off. Explaining the thought process into Beast's character design, Grammer added that they made him wear "an older, vintage X-Men suit, from Hank's time when he was younger and not into politics yet", describing it as a "little sexier and leatherier".

Hoult also spoke on the "exhaustive" makeup process of becoming Beast praising the prosthetics, but noted that in First Class, it took three to four hours to get on, adding that "was hot and claustrophobic to work in". In an interview with IGN, he noted that the makeup is "a mask, which is stuck onto [his] face with a headpiece, and that takes the majority of the time, getting it to look right with the teeth and contact lenses". For Days of Future Past, Hoult noted that the makeup changed for Beast, noting that, "It's become slightly smaller makeup, there's a bit more of my face underneath it [...] it's a different design and slightly cooler than the last one as well in terms of heat". Rhythm & Hues Studios also worked on Beast's transformations. For Apocalypse, Hoult was given a different type of "rubber" for his makeup, with Collider writer Adam Chitwood noting that it "allowed Hoult’s natural facial features to shine through more". Hoult explained that the make-up design for Dark Phoenix remained the same as it was in Apocalypse, and that he appreciated the physical, hands-on quality it brought to the character. He pointed out that using practical make-up instead of CGI helped maintain visual consistency across the films, especially when looking back at First Class.

For his appearance in The Marvels, Beast was created through an all-CGI creation with visual effects supervisor Tara DeMarco noting that Andy Park provided a concept frame for the costume, face, and hair, and was worked on in collaboration with Industrial Light & Magic London. She noted that, "We wanted to capture Kelsey Grammer in a very specific way, for the best possible lip sync with his dialog". On a podcast interview with Rob Lowe, Grammer noted that during the production of the movie someone called him saying, "Would you come down and think about just doing a little motion capture [...] We're going to put you at the end of the movie in one of those little easter egg things". He noted that one of the reasons he decided to come back to the role was so that "he didn't have to get into full Beast mode, something that took upwards of three hours at a time" when making The Last Stand.

== Fictional character biography ==
=== Early life ===
Henry "Hank" McCoy was a child prodigy mutant with prehensile feet, having graduated Harvard University at the age of fifteen. He goes to work as a researcher for the Central Intelligence Agency (CIA) "Division X", also creating a prototype for Cerebro.

=== Joining the X-Men ===
In 1962, McCoy is approached by fellow mutants Charles Xavier, Raven Darkholme and Erik Lensherr. McCoy grows close to Darkholme and reveals to her an experimental serum which he hopes to cure himself of his mutation, utilising her DNA. He goes on to assist Charles showing him Cerebro, which they plan to use to track down and recruit more mutants for their battle against Sebastian Shaw and his mutant run-Hellfire Club. McCoy and Darkholme join the CIA-run black ops team alongside other mutants Alex Summers, Sean Cassidy, Armando Munoz and Angel Salvadore who they befriend.

The Hellfire Club attack the team at their secret headquarters, and McCoy, alongside Darkholme and the others witness the CIA personnel being murdered by Riptide and Azazel. Shaw appears and attempts to recruit them to his Club. McCoy ultimately decides to remain loyal to Charles and Erik alongside Darkholme, while the rest of the team splits up. Darwin fatally attempts to assassinate Shaw. McCoy alongside Darkholme, Havok and Banshee regroup with Charles and Erik at the X-Mansion and begins to train under the guidance of Charles. McCoy later finishes creating his mutant-curing serum, but Darkholme refuses to take it. The serum, however, radically transforms McCoy into a "beast"-looking creature with blue fur, fang-like teeth, pointed ears, and claws. After trashing his lab, he meets the team, who are later dubbed the X-Men, at the hangar holding the Blackbird, a jet he designed. Though initially ashamed, Darkholme assures Hank that he is now his true self, and shouldn't be ashamed. Havok nicknames him Beast.

McCoy pilots the team to the Cuban Missile Crisis-conflict where they work to stop Shaw from starting a war. McCoy battles Azazel who almost kills him before Darkholme, in the disguise of Shaw orders Azazel to stand down. With Azazel distracted, McCoy knocks him out. After the crisis is averted, the team splits with Erik asserts that mankind would never accept the mutants. McCoy chooses to stay with Charles, while Darkholme leaves with Erik. Darkholme reminds McCoy to be proud of his mutant powers, before teleporting away.

Sometime in 1965, McCoy assists Charles with opening Xavier's School for Gifted Youngsters. However, during the Vietnam War, multiple students and staff are drafted into the military, causing the school to shut down. By the early 1970s, Charles and McCoy resided at the mansion with McCoy developing a serum to regulate both his mutation, and allow Charles to temporarily walk.

=== Original Earth-10005 version ===
==== Secretary of Mutant Affairs ====
By the 2000s, McCoy had stopped taking the serum and began to embrace his mutation. He becomes a mutant rights activist, and later starts working in the US cabinet and is appointed as the Secretary of Mutant Affairs. He is also interviewed in his human form regarding the mutant debate.

In 2006, McCoy works alongside the President of the United States as the Secretary of Mutant Affairs, and assists the government in tracking down Erik, now a notorious fugitive known as Magneto. The President informs him that Homeland Security had captured his associate, Darkholme, now known as the fugitive Mystique. McCoy raises his doubts about their ability to keep her in holding. The President tells him about a cure being manufactured at Worthington Labs which would be able to suppress mutant powers, much to McCoy's dismay and shock. McCoy returns to the X-Mansion and reunites with Charles and his fellow X-Men member and friend Storm. He also meets the Wolverine. McCoy tells Charles about the mutant "cure".

McCoy later travels to Worthington Labs which is situated at Alcatraz Island. He is greeted by Doctor Kavita Rao who introduces him to the "source" of the cure, a young mutant named Jimmy. As McCoy approaches him, he temporarily loses his blue fur. After meeting with the President again, McCoy resigns from the cabinet, angry at how a decision to turn the cure into a weapon was created without his knowledge or say. He later attends Charles' funeral after he is killed by a rogue Jean Grey. After Storm takes over as headmaster of the school, McCoy joins other X-Men members, Wolverine, Storm, Kitty Pryde, Iceman, and Colossus in stopping Magneto's attack on Worthington Labs to kill Jimmy. McCoy and the team engage in a fight with them, with Wolverine taunting McCoy about his supposed diplomacy. After the team defeats Magneto's army, McCoy de-powers Magneto while Wolverine kills Jean Grey, effectively ending the battle.

Sometime later, McCoy is hired as the first mutant ambassador to the United Nations. In 2015, McCoy is murdered by an angry mob of Human Majority protesters.

=== Revised Earth-10005 version ===
==== Visited by Wolverine ====
In 1973, while McCoy is taking care of Charles, they are approached by Wolverine whose consciousness has been sent back from the future to help stop Mystique from killing Bolivar Trask, which greenlit his Sentinel program which in turn decimates the mutant race and conquers Earth. McCoy, utilising his mutant suppression serum, asks Wolverine to leave, and attacks him in his Beast form. Eventually Charles intervenes and agrees to help Wolverine for Darkholme's sake. McCoy assists them with recruiting Peter Maximoff to help break Magneto, who was implicated in the assassination of John F. Kennedy, out of the Pentagon. McCoy later pilots Charles, Magneto and Wolverine to the Paris Peace Accords and they stop Darkholme from killing Trask. However, Magneto attempts to kill Mystique, knowing her DNA is used to later create the Sentinels. McCoy fights Magneto, and reveals his Beast form to the world.

Reuniting with Charles and Wolverine at the X-Mansion, McCoy helps Charles to utilise Cerebro and locate Mystique asking her to come home. Mystique returns in secret and reunites with McCoy. However, she destroys Cerebro to stop Charles from searching for her again. (Note: As depicted in X-Men: Days of Future Past—The Rogue Cut (2015).) They deduce she is going to Washington, D.C. to kill Trask again and travel there to stop her. McCoy wonders if the future cannot be changed to which Charles disagrees. During a presentation, the Sentinels start attacking the President and the press, due to Magneto's interference. McCoy assists Wolverine in destroying them, and uses his serum to avoid being detected by the Sentinels. Charles manages to subdue Magneto, and stop Mystique from killing Trask, thus changing the future.

==== Age of Apocalypse ====
By the 1980s, McCoy becomes a teacher at Xavier's School for Gifted Youngsters once it reopens. In 1983, he is greeted by Havok who brings his young brother, Scott Summers for enrollment. Later that night, McCoy observes an energy source originating from Cairo. The source affects a younger Jean Grey, sending Charles and Havok off to investigate and question CIA-agent Moira MacTaggert. Later, Darkholme returns home warning them that Magneto might be in trouble, and reunites with McCoy and Charles. While Charles attempts to reach Magneto, his mind is hijacked by En Sabah Nur, the world's first mutant, who remotely accesses Cerebro and forces Charles to make countries launch their nuclear arsenals into space to prevent interference. They are attacked by En Sabah Nur who has also recruited Magneto, a younger Storm, Angel and Psylocke. They kidnap Charles, with En Sabah Nur hoping to utilise his powers. Havok attempts to stop them, but causes an explosion and dies in the blast radius. After Peter Maximoff arrives and rescue everyone else in the Mansion, Colonel William Stryker arrives and kidnaps McCoy, Darkholme, Maximoff and MacTaggert believing Charles to be behind the unprecedented nuclear launch.

Summers, Grey and Nightcrawler secretly follow them and free them with the help of Stryker's "Weapon X". McCoy and the others then travel to Cairo to stop En Sabah Nur and rescue Charles. With the encouragement of Darkholme, Magneto and Storm turn on En Sabah Nur while McCoy battles Psylocke. After Grey defeats En Sabah Nur they return home and reconstruct the school. McCoy and Darkholme start training a new team of X-Men including Summers, Grey, Storm, Nightcrawler and Maximoff.

==== Dark Phoenix ====
In 1992, McCoy pilots the X-Men to space to save astronauts on the space shuttle Endeavour encountering problems, on behalf of Charles, now adviser to the President of the United States. During their mission, Grey comes into contact with solar flare-like energy. The team arrive safely back on earth as heroes. McCoy medically evaluates Grey, discovering that her vitals are off the charts, and cannot accurately pinpoint if anything is wrong with her. Later that evening, McCoy and Dakrholme discuss retiring from the X-Men. After Grey unprecedentedly attacks her fellow mutants, McCoy operates Cerebro so Charles can try reach her, which proves unsuccessful. McCoy and the rest of the X-Men attempt to follow her and bring her home. After Grey proves to be a hostile force, McCoy attempts to attack her with a gun. Trying to calm her down, Darkholme is fatally impaled by Grey. She tells McCoy she loves him before she dies.

McCoy attends her funeral, and blames Charles for Darkholme's death. McCoy steals the Blackbird and flies to Genosha and informs a retired Magneto about Darkholme's death. He teams up with Magneto and his mutant faction, head to New York City and plan to kill Grey. After learning of their plans, the X-Men attempt to stop McCoy and Magneto leading to a fight between the two factions. McCoy is eventually rendered unconscious by the Mutant Containment Unit, who place an inhibitor collar on him. He is convinced to stop trying to kill Grey by Summers and Charles. After an attack from D'Bari, McCoy is freed and witnesses Grey seemingly sacrifice herself destroying both herself and the D'Bari in the process. Returning home, Charles retires with McCoy becoming the Headmaster of the school; now renamed Jean Grey's School for Gifted Youngsters.

==== Later life ====
Sometime later, McCoy attends a meeting with the X-Men, which occurs when Colossus brings Wade Wilson to the school to try and recruit him. He closes a door so Wilson does not notice them.

In 2023, McCoy greets Wolverine, who regains the consciousness of the original timeline Wolverine.

== Alternate versions ==
Alternate versions of McCoy appear in the MCU, portrayed by Grammer.

=== Binary's universe ===
In an alternate universe, McCoy is a member of the X-Men working alongside Maria Rambeau / Binary. The two identify an averted incursion between their universe and Earth-616 and recover Monica Rambeau and bring her to the X-Mansion. Following her displacement into their world, Monica awakens and meets McCoy and Rambeau. McCoy theorises Monica has impossibly crossed over from a parallel reality and leaves to update Charles Xavier.

=== Death of the X-Men ===
In another alternate universe, McCoy was killed by anti-mutant humans while an alternate version of the Wolverine was out binge drinking at a bar.

== Reception ==
=== Grammer's portrayal ===
Grammer's iteration of Beast has received critical praise for his portrayal but some criticism towards his make-up and costume. (Note: As cited by IGN, and Backlot.) IGN writer Stax felt that Grammer's Beast fared better than many expected in The Last Stand, calling him a highlight of the film in his review. He opined that "Grammer brings a dignity and heft to the role despite the hit-and-miss make-up". Writing for The Young Folks, Jon Winkler called Grammer a standout of the film, citing that he "shows one of the best struggles in the mutant cure debate of the story: a mutant trying to support something against his species". He praised the way "Grammer shows the internal struggle McCoy is dealing with: whether or not to be loyal to the kind that identified him or the kind that embraced him". Backlot writer Adam Donaldson felt that Grammer does Beast "justice despite issues of make-up beyond the actor's control". In a retrospective review of The Last Stand, MovieWeb writer Jonathan Fuge noted that "while the movie itself was met with mixed reviews, opinion was unanimous that [Grammer] was pitch-perfect casting for the hyper-intelligent, blue-furred mutant".

Conversely, American film critic Nathan Rabin called him an "incontestably a figure of fun" in the film, feeling that Grammer's Beast was just another version of his character Frasier Crane from Frasier (1993–2004). He also felt that Grammer's iteration of the Beast was more "distractingly comic" compared to Hugh Jackman's portrayal of Wolverine.

=== Hoult's portrayal ===
In a review for First Class, writing for RogerEbert.com, Roger Ebert praised Hoult for embodying his role "convincingly" despite some make-up and costume issues. He described Hoult's costume as a "shag-rug suit". Heroic Hollywood writer Mike Annerino called Hoult's iteration of Beast a "fan-favorite character".

=== Accolades ===
Award	Year	Recipient	Category	Nominated work	Result	Ref.
Kids' Choice Awards	2017	Nicholas Hoult (Note: Shared with James McAvoy, Michael Fassbender, Jennifer Lawrence, Evan Peters, Tye Sheridan, Ben Hardy, Kodi Smit-McPhee, Sophie Turner, Alexandra Shipp and Olivia Munn)	Favorite Squad	X-Men: Apocalypse	Nominated	
Saturn Awards	2007	Kelsey Grammer	Best Supporting Actor	X-Men: The Last Stand	Nominated	
Teen Choice Award	2011	Nicholas Hoult (Note: Shared with Lucas Till, Jennifer Lawrence, Zoë Kravitz, Caleb Landry Jones, & Edi Gathegi)	Choice Movie: Chemistry	X-Men: First Class	Nominated	
Teen Choice Award	2014	Nicholas Hoult	Choice Movie Scene Stealer	X-Men: Days of Future Past	Nominated	
Young Hollywood Awards	2014	Nicholas Hoult	Super Superhero	X-Men: Days of Future Past	Nominated	

== In other media ==
=== Video games ===
- Beast / Hank McCoy appears in X-Men: The Official Game, voiced by Gregg Berger.
- Beast / Hank McCoy appears as an non-player character in X2: Wolverine's Revenge, voiced by Richard Portnow.

== Merchandise ==
Hot Toys released a flocked 1/6 scale collectible action figure of Beast, marking the first official look at the character prior to the release of Avengers: Doomsday as he was not included in the first trailer. Hasbro also released a 6-inch Marvel Legends action figure, marking the first live-action version of Beast in action figure form. Funko released a Walmart exclusive bobblehead toy of the character.
