= Marauders (comic book) =

Ongoing Marvel Comics since 2019

- Cover to Marauders #1 by Russell Dauterman (artist) and Matthew Wilson (colorist).

Publication information
- Publisher: Marvel Comics
- Schedule: Monthly
- No. of issues: 27 (as of January 12, 2022)

Creative team
- Created by: Gerry Duggan (writer); Matteo Lolli (artist)
- Written by: Gerry Duggan; Vita Ayala; Benjamin Percy
- Artist(s): Matteo Lolli; Michele Bandini; Lucas Werneck; Mario del Pennino; Stefano Caselli; Covers; Russell Dauterman; Matthew Wilson
- Inker: Elisabetta D'Amico
- Colorist(s): Frederico Blee; Erick Arciniega; Edgar Delgado
- Editor(s): Editor; Jordan D. White; Assistant Editor; Chris Robinson; Head of X Jonathan Hickman

Marauders was the title of two ongoing comic book series starring the X-Men published by Marvel Comics beginning in 2019 during the Krakoan Age.

== Publication history ==
=== Volume 1 (2019–2022) ===
Marauders was announced in July 2019 as one of the six launch titles for Marvel's Dawn of X initiative, a franchise-wide reset of the status quo of the X-Men series created by Jonathan Hickman. In October 2019, Marauders was launched as a sister book to the flagship X-Men title, featuring a team of X-Men traveling the world by ship to protect mutantkind.

=== Volume 2 (2022–2024) ===
As part of the Destiny of X revamp, writer Steve Orlando took the helm of the book with a second volume and a new main cast: Kate Pryde, Bishop, Tempo, Daken, Aurora, Psylocke (Kwannon), and new character Somnus. Their first stint together had them encounter Brimstone Love, a character originally from the alternate continuity of X-Men 2099.

== Plot ==
After arriving on Krakoa, Kate Pryde is contacted by Emma Frost who explains to her that some countries refuse to recognize Krakoa's sovereignty, have rejected life-saving Krakoan drugs, and refuse to let their mutant citizens enter Krakoa. Iceman heads through a Krakoan gateway to Russia, where he is attacked by the Russian military. Kate, Storm, Iceman, and Pyro sail to Russia and take out the blockade, allowing the mutants passage. Frost offers Kate the chance to captain her own ship to protect Krakoa's interests. In London, Frost and Sebastian Shaw clash over their designs for the vacant seat on the Quiet Council of Krakoa. The Marauders rendezvous with Bishop, who is investigating the disappearance of the husband of anti-mutant socialite Mrs. Zhao.

Shaw has the Five resurrect his son Shinobi, with plans on crowning him Red King. Shaw is thwarted by Emma, who undermines him and appoints Kate as the Red Queen. In turn, Kate appoints Bishop as Red Bishop. Enraged, Shaw reluctantly makes Shinobi his Black Bishop.

Kate and Bishop discover that Mrs. Zhao had locked her husband away and blamed it on mutants to increase tensions. They release the husband, who now worships mutants as gods following the establishment of Krakoa. Zhao partners with the Homines Verendi, a human supremacy group based in Madripoor, in the hopes of getting revenge. Christian Frost arrives at a Hellfire Company meeting, where Shaw attempts to divert the Marauders to Madripoor. Although Christian abstains from the vote, Emma and Kate vote for Shinobi to continue his route to Madripoor. However, they learn that his boat is being attacked. When the Marauders arrive, they are attacked by Donald Pierce and soldiers led by Zhao. The Marauders split up, with Kate tasked with transporting Pierce's armor to Krakoa so it can be researched. However, Shaw ambushes Kate and leaves her to drown so that he can claim her Council seat for Shinobi.

Emma meets with Callisto and invites her to be her White Knight, which she agrees to as long as Emma funds an enclave in Arizona for the Morlocks to live. Homines Verendi meet with the Russian ambassador and offer to sell her intel on Krakoa in exchange for their power-dampening technology. Bishop attacks a Verendi group and sneaks aboard their ship, where he finds Kate's corpse. After Emma and Pyro warn Verendi not to interfere with mutant affairs, the Marauders and Forge destroy the Russian ship transporting the power-dampening tech. At Kate's funeral, Emma discovers that Shaw murdered Kate. After initial difficulties, the Five resurrect Kate, who plans revenge.

Kate and Emma storm the Black Keep and attack Shaw, who is unable to defend himself with his powers after Emma shoots him with a power-dampening bullet. Emma explains to Shaw that Kate will now be in charge of the Hellfire Trading Company's black market deals, with Shinobi dealing with the mundane side of the business. Emma begins making plans for the Hellfire Gala, a state dinner to be held on Krakoa inviting the human heads of state from around the world, with Kate extending an invitation to Zhao and the members of Verendi. The Marauders begin buying properties in Madripoor and converting them into hospitals and schools as a sign of defiance towards the Verendi.

In the last issues:

- Wilhelmina Kensington leaves the Homines Verendi.
- it is discovered that Lourdes Chantel, Shaw's former fiancée, is alive, having faked her death.
- Shaw reveals to Harry Leland learns that Shinobi is not his biological son, but Leland's.
- Iceman and Christian Frost leave the team on sabbatical, while Pyro goes on book tour.
- Shaw and Emma abdicate from Hellfire Trading to focus on the Quiet Council full-time, with their positions being taken over by Chantel and the Cuckoos.

== List of characters ==
=== Members ===
In 2019, the X-Men's splinter team debuted in Marauders #1.

Members
Character	Real name	Joined in	Notes
Captain Kate Pryde / Red Queen	Katherine "Kate" Anne Pryde	Marauders #1	None
Lockheed		Marauders #1	None
Emma Frost / White Queen	Emma Grace Frost	Marauders #1	Leaves the team in Marauders #27
Iceman	Robert Louis "Bobby" Drake	Marauders #1	Leaves the team in Marauders #27
Storm	Ororo Munroe	Marauders #1	Leaves the team in Marauders #20
Pyro	St. John Allerdyce	Marauders #1	Leaves the team in Marauders #27
Black King	Sebastian Shaw	Marauders #1	Leaves the team in Marauders #27
Bishop	Lucas Bishop	Marauders #2	None
Callisto	Unknown	Marauders #7	None
Tempo	Heather Tucker	Marauders Annual #1	None
Psylocke	Kwannon	Marauders Annual #1	Migrated from Hellions
Aurora	Jeanne-Marie Beaubier	Marauders Annual #1	Migrated from X-Factor (2020).
Fang Daken (formerly)	Akihiro	Marauders Annual #1	Migrated from X-Factor (2020).
Somnus	Carl Valentino	Marauders Annual #1	None
Cassandra Nova		Marauders (vol. 2) #1	None

=== Supporting characters ===
- Chen Zhao
- Christian Frost
- Emergency Response Team (Alchemist, Birdy, Brutha Nature, Triage, Wind Dancer)
- Lourdes Chantel
- Masque
- Morlocks
- Modus Verendi
- Shinobi Shaw

=== Characters by issue ===
Issues	Characters
Volume 1
#1	Bishop; Emma Frost; Iceman; Kate Pryde; Lockheed; Pyro; Storm
#2–4	Bishop; Emma Frost; Iceman; Kate Pryde; Pyro; Sebastian Shaw; Storm
#5–6	Bishop; Christian Frost; Emma Frost; Iceman; Kate Pryde; Lockheed; Pyro; Sebastian Shaw; Storm
#7	Bishop; Callisto; Emma Frost; Iceman; Lockheed; Pyro; Sebastian Shaw; Storm
#8–9	Bishop; Emma Frost; Iceman; Lockheed; Pyro; Sebastian Shaw; Storm
#10	Bishop; Callisto; Christian Frost; Emma Frost; Forge; Iceman; Storm
#11	Emma Frost; Kate Pryde; Lockheed; Nightcrawler; Storm
#12	Bishop; Emma Frost; Iceman; Kate Pryde; Lockheed; Nightcrawler; Pyro; Sebastian Shaw; Storm
#13–15	X of Swords crossover
#16	Bishop; Emma Frost; Kate Pryde; Sebastian Shaw; Storm
#17	Bishop; Callisto; Christian Frost; Emma Frost; Kate Pryde; Sebastian Shaw; Shinobi Shaw; Storm
#18	Bishop; Callisto; Emma Frost; Iceman; Kate Pryde; Magneto; Masque; Professor X; Pyro
#19	Bishop; Callisto; Iceman; Kate Pryde; Marrow; Masque; Pyro
#20	Bishop; Callisto; Emma Frost; Iceman; Kate Pryde; Pyro; Sebastian Shaw; Storm
#21	Hellfire Gala event
#22	Charles Xavier; Emma Frost; Sebastian Shaw; Stepford Cuckoos; Wilhelmina Kensington
#23	Banshee; Emma Frost; Kate Pryde; Stepford Cuckoos; Wilhelmina Kensington
#24	Bishop; Emma Frost; Kate Pryde; Pyro; Sebastian Shaw
#25	Bishop; Eden Rixio; Emma Frost; Kate Pryde; Pyro; Sebastian Shaw
#26	Callisto; Christian Frost; Emma Frost; Harry Leland; Iceman; Kate Pryde; Lockheed; Pyro; Sebastian Shaw
#27	Callisto; Christian Frost; Emma Frost; Iceman; Kate Pryde; Lourdes Chantel; Masque; Pyro; Sebastian Shaw
Volume 2
Annual #1	Aurora; Bishop; Daken; Kate Pryde; Psylocke; Somnus; Tempo
#1-12	Aurora; Bishop; Daken; Cassandra Nova; Kate Pryde; Psylocke; Somnus; Tempo

== Critical reception ==
In February 2020, Oliver Sava of The A.V. Club stated that the first volume "combines political intrigue with breathtaking action and a sharp sense of humor, digging deep into X-Men history while enthusiastically sailing into a future full of promise and danger. The first arc of Marauders expertly balances light and dark elements as it details the exploits of the new Hellfire Corporation, splitting power three ways between White Queen Emma Frost, Black King Sebastian Shaw, and Red Queen Kate Pryde". Sava thought the Dawn of X series hit "on all of the major plot points of the Hickman era while enriching its steadily expanding cast of the characters" and became even stronger in its second story arc, with illustrator Stefano Caselli and colorist Edgar Delgado elevating "the book's visuals with sleek action and rich expressions that sell both the drama and humor of Duggan’s script". Sava also highlighted that Duggan "does remarkable work incorporating the data pages that Hickman and designer Tom Muller introduced in HOX/POX, using them to build an ongoing side narrative". In an April 2022 overview of Destiny Of X, Sava highlighted the second volume's new creative team – "writer Steve Orlando, artist Eleonora Carlini, and colorist Matt Milla" – and opined that "the first volume of Marauders was one of the early highlights of the Krakoa era, but started to lose its way, so some fresh creative blood is welcome. This new direction shifts the book from pirate ships to spaceships, sending a newly formed team into Shi'ar territory".

In May 2022, Micheal Foulk of The Beat commented that "Kate is at her most cantankerous in this series. She's often drunk, foul-mouthed, messy, stubborn, and intrepid in all the ways Kate should be. Kate is also a brutal, savage fighter in a way we haven't witnessed in a very long time if ever". Foulk highlighted the "charming" scenes between Kate and Emma Frost which "set the tone for their working relationship throughout the series. [...] Having an entire series that is built around mutant women making power plays and working together is refreshing for this reader, and apparently frustrating to toxic men like Sebastian Shaw". While Foulk enjoyed "what Marauders does with Iceman, Pyro, and to a larger degree Bishop", he thought centering the series on women was "a good thing".

=== Prints sales ===
Issue	Publication Date	Writer(s)	Artist(s)	Colorist	Comic Book Roundup Rating	Estimated Sales to North American Retailers (First Month)	Notes
Volume 1 (2019 series)
#1	October 23, 2019	Gerry Duggan	Matteo Lolli	Federico Blee	8.3 by 25 professional critics	86,830	None
#2	November 20, 2019	Gerry Duggan	Matteo Lolli	Federico Blee	7.8 by 18 professional critics	51,241	None
#3	December 4, 2019	Gerry Duggan	Michele Bandini	Federico Blee	8.0 by 11 professional critics	49,309	None
#4	December 18, 2019	Gerry Duggan	Lucas Werneck	Federico Blee	8.4 by 8 professional critics	45,641	None
#5	January 1, 2020	Gerry Duggan	Matteo Lolli & Lucas Werneck	Federico Blee	8.4 by 8 professional critics	44,802	None
#6	January 22, 2020	Gerry Duggan	Matteo Lolli & Mario del Pennino	Erick Arciniega	8.2 by 12 professional critics	44,212	None
#7	February 5, 2020	Gerry Duggan	Stefano Caselli	Edgar Delgado	8.0 by 9 professional critics	38,799	None
#8	February 19, 2020	Gerry Duggan	Stefano Caselli	Edgar Delgado	9.0 by 10 professional critics	37,413	None
#9	March 4, 2020	Gerry Duggan	Matteo Lolli	Edgar Delgado	8.3 by 12 professional critics	39,059	None
#10	May 27, 2020	Gerry Duggan	Stefano Caselli	Edgar Delgado	8.4 by 11 professional critics	Data not available	None
#11	August 12, 2020	Gerry Duggan	Stefano Caselli	Edgar Delgado	8.5 by 10 professional critics	Data not available	None
#12	September 9, 2020	Gerry Duggan	Matteo Lolli	Edgar Delgado	7.6 by 5 professional critics	27,000–32,000	None
#13	October 7, 2020	Vita Ayala	Matteo Lolli	Edgar Delgado	8.0 by 10 professional critics	46,000–51,000	X of Swords tie-in
#14	November 4, 2020	Gerry Duggan; Benjamin Percy	Stefano Caselli	Edgar Delgado	7.5 by 8 professional critics	Data not available	X of Swords tie-in
#15	November 11, 2020	Gerry Duggan; Benjamin Percy	Stefano Caselli	Edgar Delgado	7.6 by 8 professional critics	Data not available	X of Swords tie-in
#16	December 9, 2020	Gerry Duggan	Stefano Caselli	Edgar Delgado	8.3 by 6 professional critics	Data not available	None
#17	January 13, 2021	Gerry Duggan	Matteo Lolli	Edgar Delgado	8.3 by 7 professional critics	Data not available	None
#18	February 17, 2021	Gerry Duggan	Stefano Caselli	Edgar Delgado	8.0 by 6 professional critics	Data not available	None
#19	April 7, 2021	Gerry Duggan	Stefano Caselli	Edgar Delgado	7.1 by 6 professional critics	Data not available	None
#20	May 5, 2021	Gerry Duggan	Stefano Caselli	Edgar Delgado	8.3 by 7 professional critics	Data not available	None
#21	June 2, 2021	Gerry Duggan	Matteo Lolli	Edgar Delgado	8.5 by 12 professional critics	64,517	Hellfire Gala tie-in
#22	July 21, 2021	Gerry Duggan	Klaus Janson & Matteo Lolli	Rain Beredo	7.5 by 6 professional critics	36,103	None
#23	August 18, 2021	Gerry Duggan	Ivan Fiorelli	Rain Beredo	7.1 by 6 professional critics	29,960	None
#24	September 15, 2021	Gerry Duggan	Phil Noto		7.5 by 7 professional critics	29,786	None
#25	October 27, 2021	Gerry Duggan	Phil Noto		8.4 by 5 professional critics	13,387	None
#26	December 1, 2021	Gerry Duggan	Matteo Lolli	Rain Beredo	7.7 by 4 professional critics	10,504	None
#27	January 12, 2022	Gerry Duggan	Matteo Lolli & Phil Noto	Rain Beredo & Phil Noto	7.4 by 5 professional critics	26,338	None
King in Black: Marauders (2021)
#1	February 3, 2021	Gerry Duggan	Luke Ross	Carlos Lopez	7.9 by 5 professional critics	Data not available	None
Marauders Annual (2022)
#1	January 26, 2022	Steve Orlando	Creees Lee	Rain Beredo	8.3 by 10 professional critics	26,727	None
Volume 2 (2022)
#1	April 6, 2022	Steve Orlando	Eleonora Carlini	Matt Milla	7.8 by 13 professional critics	66,013	None
#2	May 4, 2022	Steve Orlando	Eleonora Carlini	Matt Milla	7.6 by 6 professional critics	Data not available	None
#3	June 8, 2022	Steve Orlando	Eleonora Carlini	Matt Milla	7.1 by 4 professional critics	Data not available	None
#4	July 13, 2022	Steve Orlando	Eleonora Carlini	Matt Milla	6.2 by 2 professional critics	Data not available	None
#5	August 24, 2022	Steve Orlando	Andrea Broccardo	Matt Milla	7.1 by 3 professional critics	Data not available	None
#6	September 7, 2022	Steve Orlando	Andrea Broccardo	Matt Milla	8.9 by 2 professional critics	Data not available	A.X.E.: Judgment Day tie-in
#7	October 5, 2022	Steve Orlando	Eleonora Carlini	Matt Milla & Rachelle Rosenberg	7.5 by 2 professional critics	Data not available	None
#8	November 9, 2022	Steve Orlando	Eleonora Carlini	Matt Milla	7.5 by 2 professional critics	Data not available	None
#9	December 7, 2022	Steve Orlando	Eleonora Carlini	Matt Milla	6.0 by 2 professional critics	Data not available	None
#10	January 4, 2023	Steve Orlando	Eleonora Carlini	Matt Milla	6.3 by 3 professional critics	Data not available	None
#11	February 15, 2023	Steve Orlando	Eleonora Carlini	Matt Milla	7.7 by 3 professional critics	Data not available	None
#12	March 22, 2023	Steve Orlando	Eleonora Carlini	Matt Milla	7.8 by 3 professional critics	Data not available	None

== Collected editions ==
Title	Material collected	Publication date	ISBN
Marauders by Gerry Duggan Volume 1	Marauders (vol. 1) #1–6	April 28, 2020	ISBN 978-1302919948
Marauders by Gerry Duggan Volume 2	Marauders (vol. 1) #7–12	November 10, 2020	ISBN 978-1302921477
X Of Swords	Marauders (vol. 1) #13-15 and X of Swords: Creation #1, X of Swords: Stasis #1, X of Swords: Destruction #1, X-Men #12-15, Excalibur #13-15, X-Force #13-14, New Mutants #13, Wolverine #6-7, Cable #5-6, Hellions #5-6, X-Factor #4	April 22, 2021	978-1302927172
Marauders by Gerry Duggan Volume 3	Marauders (vol. 1) #16–20, Marauders: King In Black #1	August 17, 2021	ISBN 978-1302921477
X-Men: Hellfire Gala	Marauders (vol. 1) #21, X-Men #21, Planet-Size X-Men #1, S.W.O.R.D. #6, material from Classic X-Men #7	February 10, 2022	978-1302931155
Marauders by Gerry Duggan Volume 4	Marauders (vol. 1) #22-27	March 10, 2022	978-1302927196
Marauders by Gerry Duggan Volume 1 (HC)	Marauders (vol. 1) #1–12	September 14, 2021	ISBN 978-1302929756
Marauders by Gerry Duggan Volume 2 (HC)	Marauders (vol. 1) #16-20, 22–27, Marauders: King In Black #1	September 20, 2022	978-1302945213
Marauders by Steve Orlando Volume 1	Marauders (vol. 2) #1-5, Annual #1	November 22, 2022	978-1302927202
Marauders by Steve Orlando Volume 2	Marauders (vol. 2) #6-12, X-Men: Before The Fall - Mutant First Strike	August 29, 2023	
