= X-Men: First Class =

2011 film by Matthew Vaughn

- Theatrical release poster
- Directed by: Matthew Vaughn
- Screenplay by: Ashley Edward Miller; Zack Stentz; Jane Goldman; Matthew Vaughn
- Story by: Sheldon Turner; Bryan Singer
- Based on: X-Men by: Stan Lee; Jack Kirby
- Produced by: Lauren Shuler Donner; Bryan Singer; Simon Kinberg; Gregory Goodman
- Starring: James McAvoy; Michael Fassbender; Jennifer Lawrence; Rose Byrne; January Jones; Oliver Platt; Kevin Bacon
- Cinematography: John Mathieson
- Edited by: Lee Smith; Eddie Hamilton
- Music by: Henry Jackman
- Production companies: 20th Century Fox; Marvel Entertainment; The Donners' Company; Bad Hat Harry Productions; Dune Entertainment; Ingenious Film Partners
- Distributed by: 20th Century Fox
- Release dates: May 25, 2011 (Ziegfeld Theatre); June 1, 2011 (United Kingdom); June 3, 2011 (United States)
- Running time: 132 minutes
- Countries: United States; United Kingdom
- Language: English
- Budget: $140–160 million
- Box office: $353 million

X-Men: First Class (stylized on-screen as X: First Class) is a 2011 superhero film based on the Marvel Comics superhero team the X-Men. Directed by Matthew Vaughn and written by Ashley Edward Miller, Zack Stentz, Jane Goldman and Vaughn, the film stars an ensemble cast led by James McAvoy, Michael Fassbender, Jennifer Lawrence, Rose Byrne, January Jones, Oliver Platt, and Kevin Bacon. It is a prequel to X-Men (2000), the fifth installment in the X-Men film series, and the first film in the X-Men prequel tetralogy. X-Men: First Class is set primarily in 1962 during the Cuban Missile Crisis, and focuses on the relationship between Charles Xavier and Erik Lehnsherr / Magneto, and the origin of their groups—the X-Men and the Brotherhood of Mutants, respectively—as they deal with the Hellfire Club led by Sebastian Shaw, a mutant supremacist bent on starting a nuclear war.

Producer Lauren Shuler Donner first thought of a prequel based on the young X-Men during the production of X2; producer Simon Kinberg later suggested to 20th Century Fox an adaptation of the comic series X-Men: First Class, although the film does not follow the comic closely. Singer, who had directed both X-Men and X2, became involved with the project in 2009, but he could only produce and co-write X-Men: First Class due to his work on other projects. Vaughn became the director and also wrote the final script with his writing partner Jane Goldman. Principal photography began in August 2010 and concluded in December, with additional filming completed in April 2011. Locations included Oxford, the Mojave Desert and Georgia, with soundstage work done in both Pinewood Studios and the 20th Century Fox stages in Los Angeles. The depiction of the 1960s drew inspiration from the James Bond films of the period.

X-Men: First Class premiered at the Ziegfeld Theatre on May 25, 2011, and was released in the United States on June 3. The film was a critical and commercial success, receiving positive reviews from critics, and grossing $353 million worldwide. A sequel, X-Men: Days of Future Past, was released in May 2014.

== Plot ==
In 1944, at the Auschwitz concentration camp, Nazi officer Klaus Schmidt witnesses a young Erik Lehnsherr bending a metal gate with his mind upon being separated from his parents. Schmidt brings Lehnsherr into his office and tells him to move a Nazi-decorated coin on his desk. When Lehnsherr cannot do it, Schmidt kills his mother. Distraught, Lehnsherr's magnetic power manifests, destroying the room. Meanwhile, at a mansion in Westchester County, New York, young telepath Charles Xavier meets Raven, a scaly blue-skinned shapeshifter who is, at the time, disguised as his mother. Charles notices this due to his telepathic powers, and the young mutants revel in the thought of finding someone else with abilities. He then invites her to live with him as his sister.

In 1962, Lehnsherr tracks Schmidt while Xavier earns his doctorate from the University of Oxford. In Las Vegas, CIA officer Moira MacTaggert follows U.S. Army Colonel Hendry into the Hellfire Club, where Hendry meets with Schmidt (now called Sebastian Shaw), mutant telepath Emma Frost, cyclone-producing Riptide, and teleporter Azazel. Threatened by Shaw and teleported to the Joint War Room, Hendry advocates deploying nuclear missiles in Turkey. Shaw, an energy-absorbing mutant whose powers have kept him young, later kills Hendry.

MacTaggert, seeking Xavier's advice on mutation, takes him and Raven to the CIA, where they convince Director McCone that mutants exist and that Shaw is a threat. Another CIA officer sponsors the mutants and invites them to the secret "Division X" facility. MacTaggert and Xavier find Shaw as Lehnsherr attacks him, and Xavier rescues Lehnsherr from drowning before Shaw escapes. Xavier brings Lehnsherr to Division X, where they meet Hank McCoy, a mutant scientist with prehensile feet. Xavier uses McCoy's mutant-locating device, Cerebro, to seek and recruit other mutants; Angel Salvadore, Armando Muñoz, Alex Summers, and Sean Cassidy.

Xavier, Lehnsherr, and MacTaggert lead a CIA mission to the Soviet Union to capture Shaw; they instead learn from Frost that Shaw intends to start World War III, triggering mutant ascendency. Azazel, Riptide, and Shaw attack Division X, killing everyone but the mutants, whom Shaw invites to join him. Angel accepts, but when Alex and Armando retaliate, Shaw kills the latter. In Moscow, Shaw compels the generals to have the USSR install missiles in Cuba. Wearing a helmet that blocks telepathy, (Note: As depicted in X-Men (2000)) Shaw follows the Soviet fleet in a submarine to ensure the missiles break a U.S. blockade. In the meantime, Xavier takes the remaining recruits back to his mansion, where they focus on harnessing their abilities. McCoy believes Raven's DNA may provide a "cure" for their appearance and manages to manufacture one, but Raven, having been persuaded by Lehnsherr, decides she does not want to hide her identity and refuses the cure. McCoy uses it on himself, but it backfires, giving him blue fur and a leonine appearance.

With McCoy piloting, the mutants and MacTaggert fly to the blockade line. Xavier uses telepathy to make a Soviet sailor destroy the missile ship, while Lehnsherr uses his magnetic powers to lift Shaw's submarine onto land. Lehnsherr grabs Shaw's helmet in battle, allowing Xavier to immobilize him. However, Lehnsherr reveals that he shares Shaw's exclusivist view of mutants but wants revenge for his mother's death. While Shaw is still immobilized, Lehnsherr kills him by slowly forcing the Nazi-decorated coin through his head.

Both fleets fire at the mutants out of fear, but Lehnsherr halts the barrage. As he redirects the fired munitions, intending to destroy the fleets, MacTaggert attempts to shoot him; one of the bullets he deflects hits Xavier's spine. Distracted by Xavier's injury, Lehnsherr lets the artillery fall into the ocean. Xavier and Lehnsherr part ways over their differing views on mutants and humans, and Lehnsherr leaves with Angel, Azazel, Riptide, and Raven. Later, a wheelchair-using Xavier returns to the mansion with his mutants to open a school. MacTaggert promises to keep Xavier's location secret, but he wipes her memories to ensure it. Meanwhile, Lehnsherr, now going by the name of Magneto and leading the Hellfire Club, frees Frost from prison.

== Cast ==
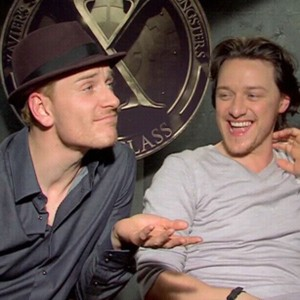
Actors Michael Fassbender and James McAvoy at a press junket

- James McAvoy as Charles Xavier (24 years):
  The mutant leader and founder of the X-Men. He is a close friend of Erik Lehnsherr until their differing views of mutantkind's place in humanity create a schism between them. McAvoy was Vaughn's top choice for Xavier, and, after being cast, auditioned with every actor considered for Magneto to test the duo's chemistry. McAvoy said he did not read comic books as a child, but added that he was a fan of the X-Men animated series from age ten. While he describes the older Charles Xavier as "a monk ... a selfless, egoless almost sexless force for the betterment of humanity and mortality", he says that the younger Xavier is a very different person: "It's quite fun because the complete opposite of that is an ego-fueled, sexed up self-serving dude. And not going too far with it, but he's definitely got an ego and he's definitely got a sex drive as well." McAvoy admitted to feeling similarities between Xavier/Magneto and Martin Luther King Jr./Malcolm X, stating that the film was "sort of like meeting them at a point where they are still finding out who they are and you are still seeing some of the events that shaped them." McAvoy avoided doing any callbacks to Patrick Stewart's performance as Xavier as Vaughn told him and Michael Fassbender to only take the allusion to Xavier and Magneto's old friendship in the other films as inspiration. Vaughn stated that since he considered Professor X "a bit of a pious, sanctimonious boring character, and he's got too much fucking power", the script would make young Xavier more interesting by "making him more of a rogue" who would become more responsible as his mission of finding more mutants went on.
  - Laurence Belcher as Charles Xavier (12 years).
- Michael Fassbender as Erik Lehnsherr: (Note: The onscreen credits spell the character's name as "Lensherr". However, previous X-Men films, the film's official website and the Marvel Comics web page for the character Archived December 17, 2010, at the Wayback Machine spell the name "Lehnsherr".)
  A Nazi hunter and mutant capable of manipulating and generating electromagnetic fields. He becomes Xavier's friend and ally until their philosophical differences create a schism between them. Fassbender auditioned for an earlier Matthew Vaughn project, and the director remembered him and sent Fassbender the X-Men script. Though Fassbender knew little of the superhero team, he became interested in the part after reading the script and familiarizing himself with Magneto in the comics. Fassbender, who considered Lehnsherr as a Machiavellian character who is neither good nor evil, watched Ian McKellen's performances to get the flavor of Magneto, but ultimately chose to "paint a new canvas" with the character, "just going my own way and working with whatever is in the comic books and the script." Looking back at the role in 2023, Fassbender admitted to Vanity Fair that what drew him to the role was the idea of Magneto being an outsider who feels that he doesn't belong, interesting him the prospect of looking for justifications for his character's monumental actions, the lengths he would be willing to go and what his motivations were, feeling that at his core, all Magneto needs is "a hug". Vaughn said Lehnsherr "is straight up cool; he's Han Solo while Professor X is Obi-Wan Kenobi".
  - Bill Milner plays young Erik, although archived footage of Brett Morris, who previously played the same character at the same age, was reused for the beginning.
- Kevin Bacon as Sebastian Shaw:
  A mutant former Nazi scientist and the leader of the Hellfire Club, a secret society bent on taking over the world. He has the power of absorbing and redirecting kinetic and radiated energy. Vaughn first offered the part to Mark Strong, who turned it down. Producer Lauren Shuler Donner said Bacon was considered for Shaw for being an actor who could convey a villain "with different shades, that's not always clear that he's the bad guy". Vaughn added that Bacon "had that bravado that Shaw needed", while stating that the actor was his top choice along with Colin Firth, who would later work with Vaughn on the Kingsman film series. Bacon accepted the role as he was a fan of Vaughn's Kick-Ass (2010), and liked both the character of Shaw and the script, which he described as "a fresh look at the franchise, but also the comic book movies in general". The actor considered that Shaw was a sociopath to whom "the morality of the world did not apply", with producer Simon Kinberg adding that Bacon portrayed him as "somebody, who in his mind, is the hero of the movie". Bacon also said that "aside from the kind of evil side, I portrayed him as kind of a Hugh Hefner type". Vaughn discarded Shaw's look from the comics as he felt he would "look like an Austin Powers villain".
- Rose Byrne as Moira MacTaggert:
  A CIA agent who befriends Xavier and Lehnsherr. Byrne said she was unfamiliar with both the comics and the film series, except for "what a juggernaut of a film it was". The actress was cast late into production, which had already begun by the time she was picked for the role. MacTaggert was described by Byrne as "a woman in a man's world, she's very feisty and ambitious—you know, she's got a toughness about her which I liked".
- Jennifer Lawrence as Raven / Mystique:
  A shape-shifting mutant who is Xavier's childhood friend and adoptive sister who joins Lehnsherr's Brotherhood of Mutants and Hank's love interest. After the dramatic Winter's Bone (2010), Lawrence sought First Class to do "something a little lighter". Despite having not seen any of the X-Men films, the actress watched them and became a fan, which led her to accept the role as well, as did the prospect of working with Vaughn, McAvoy and Fassbender. Vaughn said Lawrence was picked because "she could pull off the challenging dichotomy that Raven faces as she transforms into Mystique; that vulnerability that shields a powerful inner strength." Lawrence had some reservations about her performance due to Mystique's previous portrayal by Rebecca Romijn, as she considered Romijn to be "the most gorgeous person in the world", and felt their portrayals were very contrasting, feeling hers was "sweet and naive" while Romijn was "sultry and mean". The actress went on a diet and had to work out for two hours daily to keep in shape, and for Mystique's blue form, Lawrence had to undergo an eight-hour make-up process similar to that of Romijn in the other films. The first day with make-up caused blisters to appear on Lawrence's upper body.
  - Morgan Lily as young Raven (10 years): with the actress wearing a slip-on bodysuit and facial appliances which only took one hour and a half to apply, as subjecting a child actor to the extensive make-up was impractical.
  - Rebecca Romijn as older Raven: a brief uncredited cameo, which Vaughn added as an in-joke—the script has Raven "becom[ing] Brigitte Bardot or Marilyn Monroe, like an older sex icon of those times".
- Oliver Platt as Man In Black Suit:
  A CIA agent and head of Division X, a government agency working with the X-Men. Vaughn considered his friend Dexter Fletcher for the part, but the studio felt the cast had too many British actors, and Fletcher himself declined, to direct Wild Bill (2011).
- Álex González as Janos Quested / Riptide:
  A silent mutant member of the Hellfire Club, with the ability to create powerful whirlwinds from his hands and body. First Class marks the first English-language film for González, who auditioned while taking English classes in London. He enjoyed playing a villain as most of his film roles in Spain were for "good guys", and compared Riptide's respectable and polite personality, which can suddenly be dropped to perform fierce attacks, to a hurricane; in a translation of a Portuguese-language interview, he is quoted as saying, "When I see a hurricane from far, it is calm. The only thing I can see is a kind of tube. But from inside, up close, it is really dangerous."
- Jason Flemyng as Azazel:
  A mutant who has the ability to teleport, and is also a member of the Hellfire Club. Flemyng, who had previously been considered for Beast in The Last Stand, said he did not want more make-up-heavy roles after playing Calibos in Clash of the Titans (2010), but made an exception for Azazel as he liked working with Vaughn. Due to the Cold War setting, Flemyng tried to imply that Azazel is Russian to partly explain his pleasure in killing CIA agents. The actor spent eight weeks with fight training, particularly with swords, and had to undergo a four-hour make-up process, which like Mystique was designed by Spectral Motion—but did not include Azazel's tail, which was computer-generated. Shuler Donner considered that the problems with the shade of red on Azazel's skin—"some looked like the Devil, some like a man wearing red paint"—was overcome by adding scars that made him more human, eyes brighter than Flemyng's own, and "a black mane of hair that seemed to tie everything in".
- Zoë Kravitz as Angel Salvadore:
  A mutant with dragonfly wings which are tattooed on her body and who possesses acidic saliva. The make-up team took four hours to apply Angel's wing tattoo on Kravitz, and the visual effects team had to erase the tattoo in case the scene required Angel with the computer-generated wings. To depict flight, Kravitz stood on elevated platforms and was dangled on wires, at times from a helicopter to allow for varied camera angles.
- January Jones as Emma Frost:
  An extremely strong mutant telepath who can also change her entire body into hard diamond form, which grants her superhuman strength, stamina, psionic immunity, and durability, at the cost of using her telepathic abilities. She is a member of the Hellfire Club. Prior to Jones' casting, Alice Eve was the subject of what Variety called "widespread Internet reports" that Eve "was set to play Emma Frost, although no deal was in place." Jones accepted the role to get something different from her job in the TV series Mad Men. Upon discovering that, like the show, First Class is set in the 1960s, the actress considered, "[Frost]'s so, so far from Betty and from Mad Men, and it takes place in that time but it doesn't feel like a period movie." The actress described the revealing costumes of the character as "insane," saying, "She's got quite the bod, which is very intimidating". The actress stated that she did only a limited exercise routine to keep in shape, as "I'm a petite person, so I didn't want to go into a strict workout and eating regime."
- Nicholas Hoult as Hank / Beast:
  A genius scientist who has mutant abilities similar to those of the great apes. He attempts to cure himself of what he believes to be physically debilitating aspects of his mutation only to be transformed into a frightening-looking blue-furred entity based on a werewolf with leonine attributes. Despite his new appearance, he is kind and caring at heart. Broadway actor Benjamin Walker was previously cast as Beast, but eventually turned down the role to star in the Broadway musical Bloody Bloody Andrew Jackson. Hoult was chosen for being "gentle with a capability of being fierce", and admitted to being both an X-Men fan and enthusiastic on both returning to the action genre after 2010's Clash of the Titans and working with the film's cast. The actor had to use makeup that took four hours to apply when Hank becomes the Beast, which include a mask, contact lenses, a furry muscle suit and fake teeth. As Vaughn wanted Beast to look more feral than the version Kelsey Grammer played in X-Men: The Last Stand (2006), the redesign went through various tests, which tried to make Beast not resemble any particular animal but still look like Hoult, as well as with a furry body, which makeup artist Alec Gillis of Amalgamated Dynamics (ADI) likened to "something akin to a wolf's pelt on his face, his arms—everywhere". The suits employed actual dyed fur from fox pelts.
- Caleb Landry Jones as Cassidy / Banshee:
  An American mutant capable of emitting incredibly strong ultrasonic screams, sonic blasts, sonic bursts, and sonic waves used in various ways including as a means of flight. Jones auditioned without knowing what X-Men character he was up for, saying he auditioned because it was a superhero that fit his biotype: "I've got red hair and freckles, I'm not gonna be Batman, Robin or Spider-Man". The actor also stated that the script defined the character more than the comics, as Banshee went through various reinventions in print. Given Banshee gets involved with MacTaggert in the comics, Jones also tried to "look at her just a little bit differently, you know, when I can." As Jones suffers from acrophobia, using the rig that was to depict Banshee's flight required much preparation time with the stunt team.
- Edi Gathegi as Darwin / Armando Muñoz:
  A mutant with the ability of "reactive evolution." Gathegi became interested in a role in the X-Men films after seeing X2 (2003), and had previously auditioned for Agent Zero in X-Men Origins: Wolverine (2009). He read for Banshee while auditioning for First Class, and only learned he was playing Darwin a few days prior to the shoot. Gathegi worked out and entered an eating regime to get in shape, and also researched the comics about his character. All of Darwin's transformations—getting gills, turning his skin into concrete—were done through computer graphics, with a computer-generated version of Gathegi that could seamlessly blend in and out of the human form.
- Lucas Till as Alex Summers / Havok:
  A mutant who has the ability to absorb energy and discharge it as blasts. The producers told Till his audition served for both Havok and Beast, and the actor replied that despite his lifelong dream of playing a superhero, "I know you'll kill me, but if I get Beast, I'm not in the movie. I'm not going through that makeup everyday [sic]."

Additionally, co-stars include Glenn Morshower as Colonel Hendry, a US Army officer coerced by the Hellfire Club; Matt Craven as CIA Director McCone; Rade Šerbedžija as Russian General. Annabelle Wallis appears as the Co-ed with heterochromia. Don Creech plays William Stryker, father of Major William Stryker (a character who appears in X2, X-Men Origins: Wolverine, X-Men: Days of Future Past, and X-Men: Apocalypse). Michael Ironside, Ray Wise, James Remar, Brendan Fehr, Demetri Goritsas, Ludger Pistor, Aleksander Krupa, Tony Curran, and Sasha Pieterse also portrayed small roles in this film. Beth Goddard appears as Mrs. Xavier. Hugh Jackman reprises his role as Logan / Wolverine in an uncredited cameo in a bar, rudely rejecting Xavier and Lehnsherr when they approach him for recruitment. Jackman said he accepted the offer to appear because "it sounded perfect to me", particularly for Wolverine being the only character with a swear word. X-Men creator Stan Lee, who appeared in the first and third films and regularly made cameos in other Marvel-based films, explained that he was unable to participate in X-Men: First Class because "they shot it too far away".

== Production ==
=== Development ===
During the production of X2 (2003), producer Lauren Shuler Donner had discussed the idea of a film focusing on the young X-Men with the crew, which was met with approval; the concept was revived during the production of X-Men: The Last Stand (2006). Zak Penn, one of The Last Stand's writers, was hired to write and direct this X-Men spin-off, but this idea later fell through. Penn explained in 2007 that "the original idea was to have me do a young X-Men spin-off, a spin-off of the young X-Men characters. But someone came up with a pretty interesting idea ... it was this guy who worked with me named Mike Chamoy, he worked a lot with me on X3. He came up with how to do a young X-Men movie which is not what you'd expect."

Around the same time, in December 2004, 20th Century Fox hired screenwriter Sheldon Turner to draft a spin-off X-Men film, and he chose to write Magneto, pitching it as "The Pianist (2002) meets X-Men". According to Turner, the script he penned was set from 1939 to 1955, following Magneto trying to survive in Auschwitz. He meets Xavier, a young soldier, during the liberation of the camp. He hunts down the Nazi war criminals who tortured him, and this lust for vengeance turns him and Xavier into enemies. In April 2007, David S. Goyer was hired to direct. The film would take place mostly in flashbacks with actors in their twenties, with Ian McKellen's older Magneto as a framing device, and some usage of the computer-generated facelift applied to him in the prologue of The Last Stand, McKellen reiterated his hope to open and close the film. The Magneto film was planned to shoot in Australia for a 2009 release, but factors including the 2007–08 Writers Guild of America strike caused the producers to cancel plans for the film.

As producer Simon Kinberg read the comic series X-Men: First Class (2006–2009), he suggested studio 20th Century Fox to adapt it. Kinberg, however, did not want to follow the comic too much, as he felt "it was not fresh enough in terms of storytelling", considering them too similar to Twilight (2005) and John Hughes films, and also because the producers wanted an adaptation that would introduce new characters. Both Kinberg and Shuler Donner said that they wanted characters with visuals and powers that had not been seen and that worked well as an ensemble, even if they did not work together in the comics. Shuler Donner later said that the original idea was to green-light First Class depending on the success of X-Men Origins: Magneto. That project was seeking approval to film in Washington, D.C., and by December 2008, Goyer said filming would begin if X-Men Origins: Wolverine was successful. The story was moved forward to 1962 and involves Xavier and Magneto battling a villain.

In 2008, Josh Schwartz was hired to write the screenplay, while declining the possibility of directing X-Men: First Class. Fox later approached Bryan Singer, director of X-Men (2000) and X2, in October 2009. Schwartz later said that Singer dismissed his work as "he wanted to make a very different kind of movie", with Singer instead writing his own treatment which was then developed into a new script by Jamie Moss.

In 2009, Ian McKellen confirmed that he would not be reprising his role as Magneto in the Origins film citing his age, and Shuler Donner stated that the film might never be made, stating it was "at the back of the queue" in the studio's priorities. Both Donner and Singer have stated that Magneto would not be produced as the plot of X-Men: First Class "superseded" the story of the planned film. Singer denied using Sheldon Turner's script for Magneto as inspiration to write his draft of First Class, but the Writers Guild of America arbitration still credited Turner for the film's story, while Moss and Schwartz's collaborations ended up uncredited. Singer set the film in a period where Xavier and Magneto were in their twenties, and seeing that it was during the 1960s, added the Cuban Missile Crisis as a backdrop, considering it would be interesting to "discuss this contemporary concept in a historical context". Shuler Donner suggested the Hellfire Club as the villains.

In addition to Moss, Ashley Edward Miller and Zack Stentz were hired to rewrite the script. Miller compared it tonally to Singer's work on the first two X-Men films. The pair centered the film on Xavier and Magneto's relationship, and wrote the other characters and storylines in terms of "how they fit in the tension between Erik and Charles". Singer dropped out of the director's position in March 2010 due to his commitment to a Jack the Giant Killer (2013) adaptation. He formalized his duties from director to producer.

The producers listed various possible directors, but at first did not consider Matthew Vaughn because he started working on The Last Stand before backing out. After seeing Vaughn's satirical superhero film Kick-Ass (2010), Kinberg decided to contact Vaughn to see if he would be interested in First Class. When Fox offered Vaughn the "chance to reboot X-Men and put your stamp all over it", he first thought the studio was joking, but accepted after discovering that it was to be set in the 1960s. The director stated that First Class would become the opportunity to combine many of his dream projects: "I got my cake and ate it, managed to do an X-Men movie, and a Bond thing, and a Frankenheimer political thriller at the same time". Vaughn signed on as Singer's replacement in May 2010, and Fox subsequently announced a June 3, 2011 release date. Vaughn also rewrote the script with his screenwriting partner Jane Goldman, adding new characters and changing existing character arcs and dynamics—for instance, the idea of a love triangle between Xavier, Magneto and Moira MacTaggert was cut. The character of Sunspot was also cut, as the director felt that "we didn't have enough time or money" to make the character work. Vaughn and Goldman considered including mentions to the civil rights movement, but ultimately the director felt that "I had enough political subplot in this movie". Vaughn stated that his biggest concern was to both make Erik and Charles' friendship believable given the short timespan of the film, and on how the character of Magneto was built—"Shaw was the villain, but now you're seeing all those elements of Shaw going into Magneto." An action scene that was to have been set in a dream sequence with revolving rooms was scrapped after the release of Inception (2010).

Describing his thought process towards the material, Vaughn said he was motivated by "unfinished business" with Marvel, having been previously involved with the production of both X-Men: The Last Stand and Thor (2011). Vaughn declared that he was more enthusiastic about First Class than The Last Stand due to not being constrained by the previous installments, and having the opportunity to "start fresh", while "nodding towards" the successful elements from those films. Vaughn compared First Class to both Batman Begins (2005), which restarted a franchise with an unseen approach, and the 2009 Star Trek film, which paid homage to the original source material while taking it in a new direction with a fresh, young cast. Regarding continuity, Vaughn said his intention was "to make as good a film that could stand on its own two feet regardless of all the other films" and also that could "reboot and start a whole new X-Men franchise". Goldman added the film was kind of an "alternate history" for the X-Men, saying that while rebooting, the writers did not want to go fully "against the canon of the X-Men trilogy", comparing to the various approaches the comic had in over fifty years of publication.

The film also resurrects a central concept in the comics, the fact that radiation is one of the causes of genetic mutation in the X-Men fictional universe, and incorporates it into the story line. The concept went unused in previous years because writers in the comics more often attributed the phenomenon of mutation to evolution and natural selection.

=== Filming ===
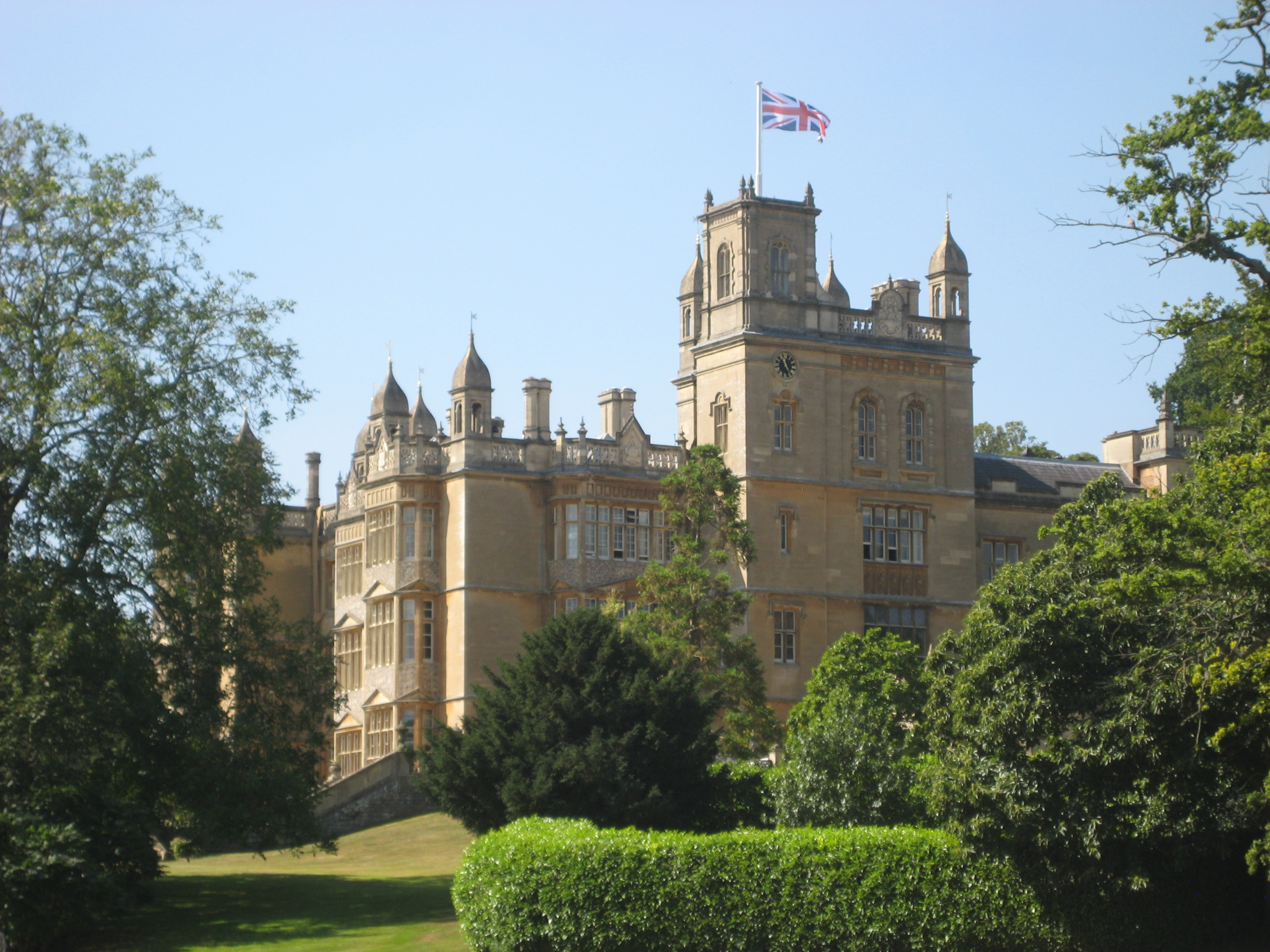
Englefield House, which served as the X-Mansion

Principal photography began on August 31, 2010, in Oxford, England, which included St Aldate's street and some of the University of Oxford's buildings, and lasted for two days. Production then moved to Pinewood Studios in Iver, and to Georgia in October, including Tybee Island, Thunderbolt, and Savannah, after sites in Louisiana, North Carolina and West Michigan were considered. Jekyll Island was chosen over Tybee Island after a producer reviewed the locations on Google Earth and thought the water near Jekyll looked bluer. Palm trees were planted into the island's sand so that it would look more like a tropical beach, but the cold weather caused many of the palm trees to become brown or die only days into the shoot, necessitating significant digital color correction from the visual effects team. Additional location shooting took place in Russia. A section of the plot is set in the Argentine coastal city of Villa Gesell, but was filmed in another province of the country with no beach but with mountains instead. Washington, D.C., the Mojave Desert and Fox's soundstages in Los Angeles also served as locations. The Englefield House in Berkshire served as the X-Mansion, and had its interior decoration adapted to resemble the way the mansion looked in the previous films. Both the submarine and the X-Jet were built on hydraulic sets so that they could be rotated for the vehicles' movements.

Principal photography ended in December, although just half of the climax had actually been filmed because producers realized the originally planned one was not going to work. Additional filming, primarily on Los Angeles and Long Beach soundstages, continued into April 2011, leaving only three-to-four weeks for post-production before the film's scheduled premiere in June. The tight schedule to meet the release date led Vaughn to declare that he had "never worked under such time pressure". The film cost approximately $160 million to produce without tax breaks, with the eventual cost around $140 million.

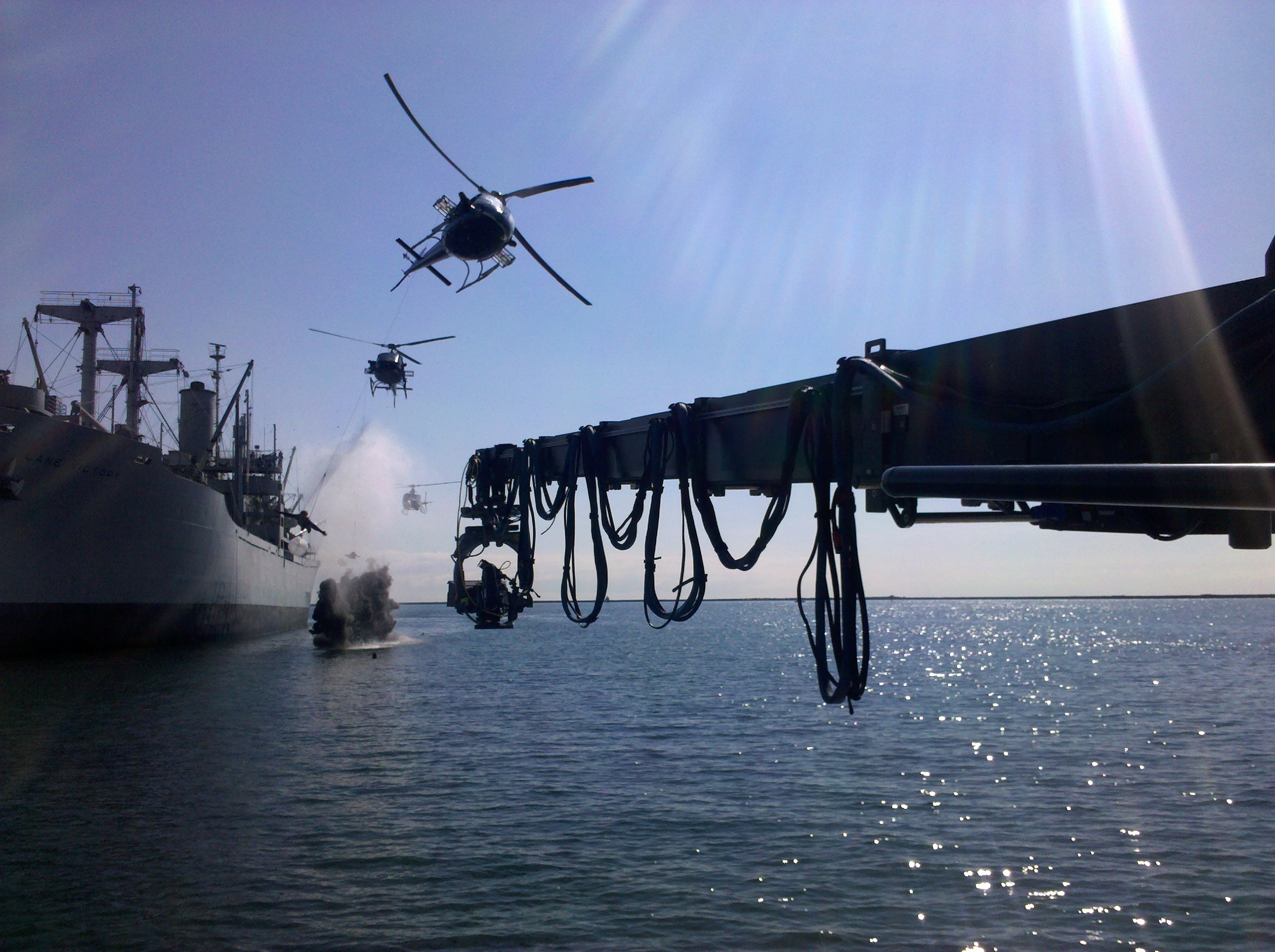
Filming of the naval battle scenes

The 1960s setting of X-Men: First Class, technologically inspired by the James Bond films of that era, also added to the international feel of the characters. Kinberg said the series was a major influence for the way they "did a cool job representing the period, in a way it still felt muscular and action-oriented", and Vaughn added that Magneto was his attempt to recreate Sean Connery's Bond in both style and the "badass, charming, ruthless and sweet" personality. The director said his goal was to "feel like a '60s Bond film, but with a little bit of reality it could be grounded in. I wanted there to be just a hint of this world of the mutants coming through. A mutant in this world having powers needed to be the equivalent of you or I sneezing, as normal as possible, at least until the humans start seeing it for the first time." At the same time, Vaughn tried to do the "bloody hard balancing" of modern and antique to recreate the 1960s in way it was "not so alien to the kids that it looked like a period piece." The director also tried to depict the era still in a realistic way, particularly "that '60s misogynist vibe" with women in skimpy suits, and MacTaggert's reliability as a CIA agent being questioned.

Vaughn said he shot the film in a way which resembled the productions of the 1960s, with "very traditional framing, and camera movement when it needs to move, not just throwing it around and whizz-bang", and using the anamorphic format "to create a widescreen experience, which is emblematic of '60s movies, such as the James Bond films". The director had to hire five cinematographers – with sole credit being given to John Mathieson, who came halfway through the shoot and did "forty-five percent, fifty-five percent" of the film—and four assistant directors to successfully convey the look he wanted for the film. Visual effects supervisor Matt Johnson added that for the lighting of the digital interior of Cerebro, "keeping with the '60s vibe, we put in some old school elements such as lens flare and chromatic aberration and edge fringing." The aesthetics of the decade were also invoked by designers Simon Clowes and Kyle Cooper of Prologue Films, who were responsible for the end credits and tried to do something that "could be done with traditional optical". The credits animation depicts DNA strands through simple geometric shapes, drawing inspiration from both Saul Bass and Maurice Binder's work in the Bond films.

The origin story made the X-Men costumes resemble the ones in the original comics, while still being functional, with the yellow parts resembling Kevlar and the blue looking like ballistic nylon, and resembling 1962 apparel in both the fabrics and the "Space Age fashion". The costumes tried to convey the characters' personalities — for instance, Xavier wore loose clothes, and Emma Frost's costumes were white and shimmery. Magneto's costume at the film's ending also closely resembled the original version from the comics, and three versions of his helmet were made, two to fit Fassbender's head and one for Bacon's.

=== Visual effects ===
First Class employed 1,150 visual effects shots, which was done by six companies: Rhythm & Hues Studios (R&H) was responsible for Emma Frost, Mystique and Angel, as well as set extensions; Cinesite handled Azazel, the visuals for Cerebro and environment effects; Luma Pictures did Banshee, Havok and Darwin; Moving Picture Company (MPC) did Beast, Riptide, and the scene where Shaw's yacht is destroyed and he escapes in a submarine; Digital Domain created Sebastian Shaw's powers, and Weta Digital was responsible for the climactic battle in Cuba. The overall coordination was provided by visual effects designer John Dykstra, who said the biggest difficulty was the tight schedule: "It was slightly less than a year and I've never done anything like that before (Spider-Man (2002) was frequently two years)."

British company 4dMax employed special 3D scanners to digitize data of the sets and actors which would be used by the visual effects companies. This allowed for computer-generated sets such as the mirrored nuclear reactor where Magneto battles Shaw—for which the effects team used the mirror maze fight in Enter the Dragon (1973) as a reference—and the domed walls of Cerebro. Digital models of Washington and Moscow were also created based on photographs of the actual cities, with the Russian one in particular having vehicles and military hardware based on videos of a 1962 Red Square, and a digital army doing an actual Soviet-style march.

With the exception of scenes featuring the actors on ships and the X-Jet (which were shot on sets) the naval battle was entirely digital, featuring simulated water and high-resolution 3D models of the X-Jet, Shaw's submarine and 16 warships. The designs were mostly based on real vehicles, with the jet being a modified SR-71 Blackbird, the submarine a combination of various models from the 1940s and 1950s, and replicas of the actual US and USSR fleets in the 1960s—though a few were not in service in 1962. A particular Soviet cruiser was a larger version of the Kresta I and II, leading Weta to dub it the Kresta III. Practical effects were still used whenever possible, such as having on location most of the objects young Erik throws after his mother's death, actors and stuntmen dangled from wires, and real explosions and light effects as reference for Havok's beams.

While in the comics Shaw's absorption power was depicted by having him grow up to ten times his original size, First Class instead does what company Digital Domain called a "kinetic echo", where a digital Kevin Bacon would be rippled, deformed and at times multiplied in repeated "iterations" that appear in a short period, to "see [Shaw] displace and deform in a kinetic and organic way". According to Dykstra, the biggest problem with Frost's diamond body was depicting it "without looking like she was made of Jell-O or the polygon model of a human being". The morphed Frost, which the visual effects tried to make look more like a faceted crystal than glass, was rotomated into Jones in the live-action plates while still retaining the actress' eyes and lips. As the character kept on going in and out of her diamond form, a motion-capture tracking suit could not be employed, so instead the effects team used both gray and chrome balls and a jumpsuit covered in mirrors—which also served as a lighting reference.

For Angel's digital wings, the animators studied slow-motion footage of dragonflies to create the wing pattern in a realistic way, and the designers added iridescence to "make the wings prettier". The visual of Banshee's screams was done through a digital ring-like structure based on renderings of sound waves such as Schlieren photography. The visual for Havok's blasts employed similar rings, concentrated in beams or rings of light which were match moved into Till's mimed throwing. For Banshee's flight, the visual effects team used digital doubles only for distant shots, with closer ones employing Jones shot in a special flight rig. Azazel's teleporting was made to resemble the "inky smoky effects" used with Nightcrawler, who appeared in X2 and was initially depicted as Azazel's son in the comics. However, while Nightcrawler only left a smoke trail, the visual effects team had Azazel accompanied by digital fire and smoke "because he was more closely aligned with the devil". The fire was also used "as a mask to hide or reveal the body", according to effects supervisor Matt Johnson.

Since the visible part of whirlwinds are the dust and dirt sucked up by them, the ones Riptide produces were made to resemble "a tornado of gas, made out of nothingness" by visual effects supervisor Nicolas Aithadi. The final product was mostly a practical effect made with dry ice, which was augmented by computer-generated imagery. The visual effects team portrayed Mystique's abilities slightly differently due to this being a younger version, with "the scales being slightly longer and the transformation being slightly showier than when she became the more mature Rebecca." For Beast, computer graphics depicted his simian-like feet, the transformation sequence, and a few facial replacements for when Beast opened his mouth wider than the mask on Hoult's face allowed.

== Music ==
Henry Jackman, who had previously collaborated with Vaughn in Kick-Ass (2010), composed the pop-and-rock infused incidental music for First Class. He further drew inspiration from John Barry's musical themes, which had a "posh pop" musical style, and also produced a "Superman-style theme" in the final parts of the film. The theme was then stretched half-time and used in the remainder of the film, after Vaughn's directions who felt it as "triumphant" score for a team that is disjointed. Several pop tracks were also integrated in the film. The original score album was released digitally by Sony Classical Records on June 6, 2011, and was followed by a physical release on July 4, 2011.

== Release ==
=== Theatrical ===
The premiere for X-Men: First Class took place at the Ziegfeld Theatre in New York City, on May 25, 2011. The promotional campaign aimed for non-traditional partners, with Fox signing deals with Farmers Insurance Group, BlackBerry PlayBook and the U.S. Army. Wrigley Australia issued an X-Men-themed edition of their 5 chewing gum.

=== Home media ===
X-Men: First Class was released on DVD and Blu-ray in the United States on September 27 and in the United Kingdom on October 31, 2011. The home release topped the sales charts in the United States with approximately 385,000 DVDs. Blu-ray accounted for 60 percent of first-week disc sales, amounting to about 575,000 discs. In the UK it sold 150,000 units. The film was later released on Ultra HD Blu-ray on October 4, 2016.

== Reception ==
=== Box office ===
X-Men: First Class went on the general release on June 3, 2011. In North America, the film opened on approximately 6,900 screens at 3,641 locations, debuting atop the weekend box office with earnings of $55.1 million across the three days, including $3.4 million in its Friday midnight launch. This opening was much lower than the opening weekends of X-Men: The Last Stand ($102.7 million), X2 ($85.5 million), and X-Men Origins: Wolverine ($85.0 million), but slightly higher than the original film ($54.5 million). Executives at 20th Century Fox stated they had achieved their goal by opening with about the same numbers as the first X-Men film and that it was an excellent start to a new chapter of the franchise.

First Class also opened in 8,900 locations in 74 overseas markets, which brought in $61 million during the weekend—standing third in the overseas ranking behind Pirates of the Caribbean: On Stranger Tides and The Hangover Part II. The film opened atop the box office in twenty countries, with the biggest grosses being in the United Kingdom ($9 million, including previews), France ($7.1 million), Mexico ($5 million), South Korea ($5.4 million) and Australia ($5.1 million). In its second weekend X-Men: First Class dropped 56.2 percent, the second-smallest second-weekend drop in the franchise behind X2: X-Men United (53.2 percent), and came in with $24.1 million, in second place to Super 8. Overseas, it rose to number two behind Kung Fu Panda 2, with $42.2 million. The film grossed $146,408,305 in the United States and Canada and $207,215,819 in foreign markets, bringing its worldwide total to $353,624,124.

=== Critical response ===
On review aggregation website Rotten Tomatoes, X-Men: First Class holds an approval rating of 86% based on 294 reviews, with an average rating of 7.4/10. The site's critical consensus reads, "With a strong script, stylish direction, and powerful performances from its well-rounded cast, X-Men: First Class is a welcome return to form for the franchise." On Metacritic, the film received a score of 65 out of 100, based on reviews from 38 critics, indicating "generally favorable reviews". Audiences polled by CinemaScore gave the film an average grade of "B+" on an A+ to F scale.

Among the major trade publications, Todd McCarthy of The Hollywood Reporter described the film as "audacious, confident and fueled by youthful energy", and said that "director Vaughn impressively maintains a strong focus dedicated to clarity and dramatic power ... and orchestrates the mayhem with a laudable coherence, a task made easier by a charging, churning score by Henry Jackman ...". Justin Chang of Variety said the film "feels swift, sleek and remarkably coherent", and that "the visual effects designed by John Dykstra are smoothly and imaginatively integrated ..." Frank Lovece of Film Journal International lauded "a wickedly smart script with a multilayered theme that ... never loses sight of its ultimate story, and makes each emotional motivation interlock, often shockingly playing for keeps with its characters." Kenny Lengel of The Arizona Republic gave the film a 3.5 out of 5 rating, stating that "X-Men: First Class isn't anywhere close to being a genre classic like Spider-Man 2 or The Dark Knight, but it is good enough to rejuvenate a franchise stuck on idle."

In consumer publications, Lisa Schwarzbaum of Entertainment Weekly praised "the kind of youthful, Brit-knockabout pop energy director Matthew Vaughn absorbed from his previous collaborations as a producer of director Guy Ritchie's bloke-y larks", and found McAvoy and Fassbender "a casting triumph. These two have, yes, real star magnetism, both individually and together: They're both cool and intense, suave and unaffected, playful and dead serious about their grand comic-book work." Peter Howell of the Toronto Star called it "a blockbuster with brains" and said Vaughn "brings similar freshness to this comic creation as he did to Kick-Ass, and manages to do so while hewing to the saga's serious dramatic intent."

=== Accolades ===
| Year of ceremony | Award | Category | Recipients | Result |
|---|---|---|---|---|
| 2011 | National Board of Review Awards | Spotlight Award | Michael Fassbender (Also for Shame, A Dangerous Method, and Jane Eyre) | Won |
| 2011 | Los Angeles Film Critics Association Awards | Best Actor | Michael Fassbender (Also for Shame, A Dangerous Method, and Jane Eyre) | Won |
| 2011 | 2011 Teen Choice Awards | Choice Movie: Breakout Actress | Jennifer Lawrence | Nominated |
| 2011 | 2011 Teen Choice Awards | Choice Movie: Breakout Actress | Zoë Kravitz | Nominated |
| 2011 | 2011 Teen Choice Awards | Choice Movie: Villain | Kevin Bacon | Nominated |
| 2011 | 2011 Teen Choice Awards | Choice Movie: Chemistry | Lucas Till, Jennifer Lawrence, Nicholas Hoult, Zoë Kravitz, Caleb Landry Jones and Edi Gathegi | Nominated |
| 2011 | 2011 Teen Choice Awards | Choice Movie: Sci-Fi/Fantasy | Film | Nominated |
| 2011 | 2011 Scream Awards | The Ultimate Scream | Film | Nominated |
| 2011 | 2011 Scream Awards | Best Scream-Play | Film | Nominated |
| 2011 | 2011 Scream Awards | Best Fantasy Movie | Film | Won |
| 2011 | 2011 Scream Awards | Best Director | Matthew Vaughn | Nominated |
| 2011 | 2011 Scream Awards | Best Fantasy Actor | James McAvoy | Nominated |
| 2011 | 2011 Scream Awards | Best Fantasy Actor | Michael Fassbender | Nominated |
| 2011 | 2011 Scream Awards | Best Fantasy Actress | Jennifer Lawrence | Nominated |
| 2011 | 2011 Scream Awards | Best Villain | Kevin Bacon | Nominated |
| 2011 | 2011 Scream Awards | Best Superhero | James McAvoy | Nominated |
| 2011 | 2011 Scream Awards | Breakout Performance: Female | Zoë Kravitz | Nominated |
| 2011 | 2011 Scream Awards | Breakout Performance: Male | Michael Fassbender | Nominated |
| 2011 | 2011 Scream Awards | Best Cameo | Hugh Jackman | Won |
| 2011 | 2011 Scream Awards | Best Ensemble | Film | Nominated |
| 2011 | 2011 Scream Awards | Best Comic Book Movie | Film | Nominated |
| 2012 | 2012 People's Choice Awards | Favorite Action Movie | Film | Nominated |
| 2012 | 2012 People's Choice Awards | Favorite Ensemble Movie Cast | | Nominated |
| 2012 | 2012 People's Choice Awards | Favorite Movie Superhero | Jennifer Lawrence | Nominated |
| 2012 | 2012 People's Choice Awards | Favorite Movie Superhero | James McAvoy | Nominated |
| 2012 | Saturn Awards | Best Science Fiction Film | X-Men: First Class | Nominated |
| 2012 | Saturn Awards | Best Make-Up | Dave Elsey, Fran Needham, and Conor O'Sullivan | Won |

== Sequels ==
The film's success led to the continuation of the film series. X-Men: Days of Future Past, which acts as a sequel to both X-Men: First Class and X-Men: The Last Stand, was released on May 23, 2014. A direct sequel, X-Men: Apocalypse, was released on May 27, 2016. A third and final sequel, Dark Phoenix, was released on June 7, 2019.
