= Elias Bogan =

- Bogan's "eyes of fire", from X-Treme X-Men #33. Art by Igor Kordey.

Publication information
- Publisher: Marvel Comics
- First appearance: X-Treme X-Men #1 (illustration in Destiny's Diaries, July 2001), #20 (mentioned, March 2003), #21 (actual appearance, April 2003)
- Created by: Chris Claremont; Salvador Larroca

In-story information
- Species: Human Mutant
- Team affiliations: Hellfire Club
- Notable aliases: Lord Imperial
- Abilities: Telepathy; Mental possession

Elias Bogan is a character appearing in American comic books published by Marvel Comics. Created by writer Chris Claremont, the character first appeared in X-Treme X-Men #21 (July 2001). Bogan is a mutant villain with telepathic powers. He is an antagonist to the superhero group known as the X-Men.

== Fictional character biography ==
Elias Bogan is a wealthy, reclusive mutant who is rumored to be the inspiration for the Hellfire Club. After losing a bet to Sebastian Shaw and his advisor Tessa, Bogan harbors a grudge against the latter and attempts to exact revenge years later by capturing her and branding her face with blood-like tattoos. However, Tessa is rescued by Storm of the X-Men.

In subsequent appearances, Bogan battles the X-Men, briefly enslaves Rachel Summers, and gains access to Cerebra. He also establishes a secret base in the catacombs under the X-Corporation, where he once had a branch of the Hellfire Club.

== Powers and abilities ==
Elias Bogan possesses telepathic abilities, which allow him to communicate with and possess others, often causing them to bleed from their eyes.
