= Leith Hill multiple aircraft accident =

1944 aviation incident in England

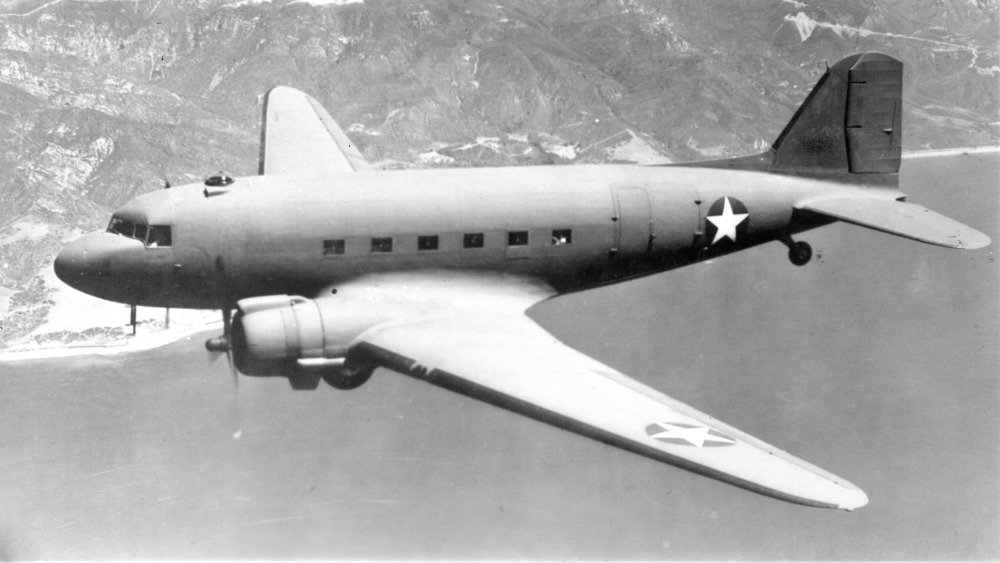
- A C-47, of the type involved in the accident

Accident
- Date: 26 November 1944
- Summary: Controlled flight into terrain in bad weather
- Site: Leith Hill, Surrey, England; 51°10′33″N 0°22′11″W
- Aircraft type: Douglas C-47A-30-DK
- Operator: United States Army Air Force
- Registration: 42-92837; 42-93754; 43-47975
- Flight origin: Advanced Landing Ground "A-4, France
- Destination: Chalgrove Airfield, England
- Fatalities: 13
- Survivors: 0

On 26 November 1944, four C-47 transport aircraft of the 442nd Operations Group departed from Advanced Landing Ground "A-4 in Pays de la Loire, northern France, en route to Chalgrove Airfield, Oxfordshire, England. The C-47s were flying in a Diamond formation. After crossing the English Channel low cloud forced the aircraft to descend from 1,500 feet to 1,200 feet. Three of the four C-47 descended another 200 feet, and shortly thereafter, the three C-47s crashed into the side of Leith Hill, the highest summit of the Greensand Ridge. The crash killed all thirteen crewmen on the three C-47, five on 43–47975, five on 42-93754 & three on 42–92837. The fourth C-47 landed safely at Chalgrove Airfield.
