= Azazel (Marvel Comics) =

Marvel comics character

- Azazel

Publication information
- Publisher: Marvel Comics
- First appearance: Uncanny X-Men #428 (July 2003)
- Created by: Chuck Austen; Sean Phillips

In-story information
- Species: Mutant
- Team affiliations: Hellfire Club; Dark X-Men
- Notable aliases: Satan; Beelzebub; Beliar
- Abilities: Paralyzing bolts projection; Prehensile tail; Shapeshifting; Teleportation; Telepathy; Night vision; Spell casting; Mind control; Immortality

Azazel is a supervillain appearing in American comic books published by Marvel Comics. Created by Chuck Austen and Sean Philips, the character first appeared in Uncanny X-Men #428 (July 2003). He belongs to the subspecies of humans named mutants, who are born with superhuman abilities. He is the father of the X-Men's Kiwi Black.

The character was played by Jason Flemyng in the film X-Men: First Class (2011) and by Eduardo Gago Munoz in the Marvel Cinematic Universe film Deadpool & Wolverine (2024).

== Publication history ==
Azazel's first appearance was in Uncanny X-Men #428 (July 2003) during "The Draco" storyline, written by Chuck Austen. The character's name comes from Azazel, an angel from the Book of Enoch mentioned first at chapter 8 verse 1. His origin story was presented in The Uncanny X-Men #433 (2004).

== Fictional character biography ==
Azazel is said to be one of the oldest mutants, belonging to an ancient group of demonic mutants called the Neyaphem. The Neyaphem were banished to the Brimstone Dimension by a group of angel-like mutants known as the Cheyarafim. Due to his power of teleportation, Azazel is able to return to Earth for brief periods of time. His main scheme to return to Earth permanently is to impregnate women, as his children are linked to his dimension and he can use them to create a stable gateway between dimensions. He meets Mystique in Germany, where she is married to a rich castle lord Christian Wagner. Mystique is introduced to Azazel, whom Christian knew as a business partner. Mystique has an affair with Azazel and subsequently uses his genetic information, combined with her own, to impregnate Destiny. Destiny had had a vision of Azazel conquering Earth and sought to stop him by making him believe that he had a son. Christian later discovers Mystique and Destiny together and is killed by Mystique. The villagers soon find out about Christian's murder and come after Mystique and her newborn son Kurt, who possesses a similar demonic appearance to Azazel. Mystique escapes by transforming into one of the villagers and drops Kurt by a tree while she goes back to save Destiny. Kurt is taken in by Margali Szardos and comes to be known as Nightcrawler.

Azazel's children, including Abyss and Kiwi Black, are called to sacrifice themselves to open a portal and bring his army to Earth. The X-Men go through the portal and confront Azazel, who torments them and makes them believe that he is Satan. In the end, the X-Men defeat Azazel and his army and banish him to an unknown oblivion. The X-Men escape along with Abyss and Kiwi Black.

=== Weapon X-Force ===
Mystique recruits Azazel to battle William Stryker, who has been resurrected and begun using dark magic. Azazel is attacked by Weapon X-Force, but quickly overpowers the team and obliges the request because of the ties Mystique has with both him and Sabretooth, as she is the mother of the sons of both men (Azazel was thought to be the father of her son Nightcrawler, and Sabretooth is the father of her son Graydon Creed).

Azazel kills all of the members of Weapon X-Force, as they are all sinners who are already designated for eternal damnation. Due to all members of Weapon X-Force possessing regenerative self-healing, Azazel keeps them in suspended animation with the use of his teleportation abilities. Frozen in time, the team's souls are transported to Hell to complete the mission and returned to their bodies afterward.

=== House of X ===
Azazel is eventually welcomed to the new mutant island of Krakoa, created by Professor X, Magneto, and Moira MacTaggert. He enters through the teleportation gateway alongside other villainous and fractious mutants, who are invited to join the nation to heal mutantdom and start over as a species. Azazel later joins the Dark X-Men, only to be killed by the "Bamf Dragon", an alternate universe version of Nightcrawler who was transformed into a demonic dragon-like form.

== Powers and abilities ==
Azazel is an immortal mutant. He is able to transport himself and others through great distances. He is able to project bolts of paralyzing energy, manipulate the minds of others, and change his appearance. Azazel can also cast magic spells.

== Reception ==
=== Critical reception ===
Andre Young of WhatCulture ranked Azazel 10th in their "10 Most Evil X-Men Villains" list. CBR.com ranked Azazel 7th in their "10 Most Powerful Comic Book Villains With Demonic Origins" list, 9th in their "X-Men: The 5 Deadliest Members Of The Hellfire Club (& The 5 Weakest)" list, and 29th in their "Age Of Apocalypse: The 30 Strongest Characters In Marvel's Coolest Alternate World" list.

== Other versions ==
=== Age of Apocalypse ===
An alternate universe version of Azazel from Earth-295 appears in Age of Apocalypse. This version is a member of Clan Akkaba and Weapon Omega's Minister of Death.

=== Marvel Zombies ===
A zombified alternate universe version of Azazel from Earth-2149, also known as the Red Terror, appears in Secret Wars.

== In other media ==
- Azazel appears in X-Men: First Class, portrayed by Jason Flemyng. This version is a member of the Hellfire Club before defecting to Erik Lehnsherr's group after he kills the Club's leader, Sebastian Shaw.
  - As of X-Men: Days of Future Past and its accompanying viral marketing campaign, it is revealed that Azazel was among several mutants who were captured, experimented on, and killed by Bolivar Trask. Additionally, according to screenplay writer Simon Kinberg, Azazel was the father of Mystique.
- An alternate timeline variant of Azazel, based on his appearance in X-Men: First Class, appears in Deadpool & Wolverine, portrayed by an uncredited Eduardo Gago Munoz.
