= Harry Leland =

- Harry Leland in The Uncanny X-Men #132; Art by John Byrne

Publication information
- Publisher: Marvel Comics
- First appearance: The Uncanny X-Men #132 (April 1980)
- Created by: Chris Claremont; John Byrne

In-story information
- Alter ego: Harold Leland
- Species: Human mutant
- Team affiliations: Hellfire Club
- Notable aliases: Black Bishop
- Abilities: Able to increase mass

Harold Leland, also known as the Black Bishop, is a supervillain appearing in American comic books published by Marvel Comics. The character has been depicted as an adversary of the X-Men.

Leland possesses the mutant ability to increase the mass of an object or person, making it extremely heavy. Thanks to his allegiance to Sebastian Shaw, he attained the rank of Black Bishop of the Lords Cardinal of the New York branch of The Hellfire Club, an exclusive secret society bent on world domination. In civilian life, he was a corporate lawyer.

== Publication history ==
Created by writer Chris Claremont and artist/co-writer John Byrne, Leland first appeared in Uncanny X-Men #132 (April 1980).

Byrne based Leland's appearance on actor-director Orson Welles. Leland's name refers to two characters in Welles' films: Harry Lime from The Third Man, and Jed Leland from Citizen Kane.

The character subsequently appears in Uncanny X-Men #132-135 (April–July 1980), #152 (Dec. 1981), and #208–209 (August–September 1986), in which he was killed. Leland made several posthumous appearances before being resurrected in Marauders (2021).

== Fictional character biography ==
Little is known of Harry Leland's past before he joined the Hellfire Club. He previously encountered Emma Frost prior to her being inducted into the Hellfire Club. At the time, Frost was homeless and using her powers during a Hellfire Club meeting to gain information about stocks. Leland takes an interest in her but comes on too strongly, and Frost runs away. Shortly after, he accompanies Sean Cassidy and his NYPD partner to an incident behind the club which involves Frost. Frost uses her telepathy to erase the memories of all three men.

Leland encounters the X-Men when they invade the New York headquarters of the Hellfire Club. Leland causes Wolverine to become increasingly heavy until he falls through the floor into a sub-basement. In the rematch, Wolverine attacks Leland from above. Leland panics and uses his mass-increasing powers, resulting in Wolverine crashing through the floor again, this time with Leland beneath him. Leland is hospitalized as a result.

Alongside the Hellfire Club, Leland battles the X-Men in New York's Central Park. When Nimrod attacks the assembled mutants, the X-Men and the Club join forces to battle Nimrod. Leland increases Nimrod's mass to make it more vulnerable to attack, but suffers a fatal heart attack in the process. Long after his death, Leland is resurrected to serve as Krakoa's ambassador to the United Nations.

== Powers and abilities ==
Harry Leland is a mutant with the ability to increase the mass of an object or person within 350 feet (110 m) of him, without affecting its size at all, making it increasingly heavy. Though he can only increase mass up to roughly 20 kilograms per second, there is seemingly no limit to the total mass he can add to a person or object. Leland's power can affect both people and inanimate objects, but active resistance by the subject makes it more difficult to assert Leland's power.

== In other media ==
- Harry Leland appears in the X-Men: The Animated Series episode "The Dark Phoenix" as a member of the Inner Circle Club.
- Harry Leland appears in the Wolverine and the X-Men episode "Foresight" as a member of the Inner Circle. He assists the group in their efforts to transfer the Phoenix Force from Jean Grey to the Stepford Cuckoos, only to be killed in the process.
- Harry Leland makes a cameo appearance in the Marvel Anime: X-Men episode "The Return - Joining Forces" as a member of the Hellfire Club.
