= X-Men (1994 video game) =

- Cover art
- Developer: Sega of America
- Publisher: Sega of America
- Producer: Jerry Markota
- Designers: Jerry Markota; Ami Matsumura-Blaire; Steve Patterson
- Programmer: Paul Hutchinson
- Composer: Paul Hutchinson
- Platform: Game Gear
- Release: NA: January 1994
- Genre: Action
- Modes: Single-player, multiplayer

X-Men is a video game that was released in 1994 for the Sega Game Gear featuring the X-Men superhero team. In the game, most of the X-Men have been captured by Magneto; only Wolverine and Cyclops escaped the initial assault on X-Men headquarters and are available for play at the start of the game. Players rescue the other X-Men and use them and their abilities to defeat Magneto.

Sega released a sequel in 1995, X-Men: Gamesmaster's Legacy.

== Gameplay ==
Players defeat enemies and navigate levels by punching, kicking, and jumping. Mutant abilities can be activated and deactivated. However, these mutant abilities drains the energy from the player's character. A new playable character is unlocked after finishing a level, including Storm, Rogue, Psylocke, Nightcrawler, and Iceman.

There are several foes from the X-Men universe to defeat including Callisto, Sauron, Sebastian Shaw, Omega Red, a Brood Queen, and Magneto. Each boss has their own stage based on various diverse settings from X-Men, including the Morlock tunnels, the Savage Land, the Hellfire Club, Madripoor, the Brood homeworld, and Avalon. These levels are often labyrinths of either technological wonders, biological wonders, or a mixture of both. As more X-Men are rescued, these allies can be called upon to take over as the player's character. Magneto serves as the final boss of the game.

== Reception ==
In the United States, it was the top-selling Game Gear game in February 1994.

X-Men received a highly positive review from GamePro, who commented "X-Men Game Gear squeezes all the action and graphics it can into four megs of Marvel-ous comic book mayhem. The long levels are complex enough to keep your battery bill high, and the challenge is strong enough to keep you busy in the back seat for that long drive to Grandma's house".
