= Lourdes Chantel =

Lourdes Chantel Black Queen

Publication information
- Publisher: Marvel Comics
- First appearance: Classic X-Men #7 (March 1987)
- Created by: Chris Claremont; John Bolton

In-story information
- Species: Human mutant
- Team affiliations: Hellfire Club
- Partnerships: Emma Frost
- Notable aliases: Black Queen
- Abilities: Teleportation

Lourdes Chantel is a character appearing in American comic books published by Marvel Comics. Created by writer Chris Claremont and artist John Bolton, the character first appeared in Classic X-Men #7 (March 1987). Chantel is a mutant with teleportation abilities who is introduced as the lover of supervillain Sebastian Shaw.

Chantel's relationship with Shaw had been abusive and, after rejecting his marriage proposal and fearing his reaction, she turned to Emma Frost for support. She later faked her death during a Sentinel attack with Frost's assistance before reemerging years later on Krakoa, where she joined the Hellfire Trading Company under the codename of Black Queen.

== Development ==
=== Concept and creation ===
Writer Chris Claremont, known for adding nods to his friends in his comics, based the X-Men character Lourdes Chantel on Lourdes Ortiz, who worked as his translator during the 1985 Barcelona Comic Convention. Chantel shares similarities in appearance and name with Ortiz.

=== Publication history ===
Lourdes Chantel debuted in Classic X-Men #7 (March 1987), created by Chris Claremont and John Bolton. She later appeared in the 2000 X-Men: Hellfire Club series, and in the 2019 Marauders series. The cover of Marauders #22 features Chantel standing in a position of authority alongside Emma Frost, the White Queen. The cover mirrors that of Marauders #2, where Sebastian Shaw previously stood beside Frost as the Black King and White Queen of the Hellfire Club.

== Fictional character biography ==
Lourdes Chantel is a mutant teleporter who was the lover of supervillain Sebastian Shaw before he became the Black King of the Hellfire Club New York Branch. The two met when Lourdes' company hired Shaw to oversee one of its projects. She tried to sway Shaw away from the Hellfire Club and its leader Ned Buckman, fearing the Club might corrupt her lover. It was Lourdes' death at the hands of Sentinels financed by Buckman which led Shaw to take over the Hellfire Club.

However, Emma Frost only made Shaw believe that Lourdes was dead, and Emma sent Lourdes to Wilson Fisk to give her a new identity.

Lourdes reappeared years later as part of the mutants living on Krakoa. She was shown to still be able to use her teleportation powers after M-Day. Lourdes then became the new Black Queen over the Hellfire Trading Corporation.

She tried to save as many mutants as she could during the attack at the Hellfire Gala, but she was shot and killed by an Orchis agent. The Five later resurrected her to fight against Orchis.

== Powers and abilities ==
Lourdes Chantel is a mutant with the ability to teleport.
