= Hellfire Club (comics) =

Fictional society appearing in Marvel Comics

- Cover for X-Men: Legacy #210, art by David Finch.

Publication information
- Publisher: Marvel Comics
- First appearance: The Uncanny X-Men #129 (January 1980)
- Created by: Chris Claremont; John Byrne

In-story information
- Base(s): Various
- Member(s): Sebastian Shaw; Emma Frost; Harry Leland; Jason Wyngarde; Donald Pierce; Tessa; Selene; Magneto; Storm; Shinobi Shaw; Trevor Fitzroy; Madelyne Pryor; Sat-yr-9; Phoenix; Sunspot; Iron Monger; Azazel

The Hellfire Club is a fictional society appearing in American comic books published by Marvel Comics. The Hellfire Club is often depicted in confrontation with the X-Men mutant superhero team. Although the Club appears to merely be an international social club for wealthy elites, its clandestine Inner Circle seeks to influence world events and advance their agenda.

The Hellfire Club was created in 1980 by the Uncanny X-Men writer/artist duo of Chris Claremont and John Byrne, who were inspired by a 1966 episode of the British television series The Avengers ("A Touch of Brimstone"). The name "Hellfire Club" was borrowed from a notorious set of gentlemen's clubs in 18th century England and Ireland. In the Marvel version, the Inner Circle hierarchy of the Hellfire Club is modeled on the pieces of a chess set, with Black and White sets of Kings, Queens, Bishops and Rooks.

The Hellfire Club and its Inner Circle were introduced in "The Dark Phoenix Saga", attempting to subvert the X-Men's Jean Grey. This incarnation, composed most notably of Black King Sebastian Shaw and White Queen Emma Frost, would remain prominent for many years. After their initial confrontations, the Hellfire Club and the X-Men settled into an uneasy alliance. This eventually changed as endless power struggles perpetuated a series of upheavals within the Inner Circle.

The club has appeared in two X-Men animated series (X-Men: The Animated Series and Wolverine and the X-Men), both times being renamed as simply the Inner Circle due to an aversion to using the term "hellfire" in a children's series. Members of the Hellfire Club appeared in 2011's X-Men: First Class as the main villains, led by Sebastian Shaw, Emma Frost, Azazel, and Riptide. The Hellfire Club's Inner Circle also appear as the main antagonists of the second season of the television series The Gifted, led by a character named Reeva Payge (played by Grace Byers) and the Frost sisters (played by Skyler Samuels).

== Publication history ==
In creating the Hellfire Club, Uncanny X-Men writer Chris Claremont and artist/co-writer John Byrne drew heavily upon a 1966 episode of the British spy series The Avengers entitled "A Touch of Brimstone". In the episode, agents John Steed and Emma Peel attempt to infiltrate a secret society named after the Hellfire Club of the 18th century, whose members of the "Inner Circle" wear period costumes. Peel's guise as "the Queen of Sin", dressed in a black leather corset, would be the model for the Club's Queens, and her first name borrowed for White Queen Emma Frost. The leader of the episode's club was played by actor Peter Wyngarde, best known for his role as Jason King, forming the basis for Mastermind's new "Jason Wyngarde" identity.

Claremont and Byrne drew the names and faces of the other Hellfire Club members from famous actors: Sebastian Shaw was based on actor Robert Shaw, Harry Leland on Orson Welles (who acted as Harry Lime in The Third Man and whose film Citizen Kane featured a reporter named Jed Leland), and Donald Pierce was based on Donald Sutherland (the surname alluding to his Hawkeye Pierce character from M*A*S*H).

Later writers would add references to The Avengers: Sir Patrick and Lady Diana, from the Philadelphia branch of the 1780s, are named after actors Patrick Macnee (John Steed) and Diana Rigg (Emma Peel); conversely, the Black Queen of the London branch was revealed to be named Ms. Emma Steed.

== Overview ==
The Hellfire Club counts among its members the most famous, wealthy, and influential members of society. Membership is passed on to descendants, and can also be earned through wealth or influence. While many accept the invitation simply for the pleasures that the Club offers, others seek wealth and influence. In fact, the purpose of the Hellfire Club is to obtain and exert power through politics and economic influence instead of outward conquest and domination. Since its foundation, the Hellfire Club has been involved in wars and assassinations to further the agendas of the Club's most powerful members.

The Club has branches in New York City, London, Hong Kong, Paris, and Buenos Aires; the various branches are all overseen by the Lord Imperial (a position long-held by Sir Gordon Phillips). Sebastian Shaw, the Black Bishop, began securing allies within the Club, meeting Harry Leland, Emma Frost, and Donald Pierce, as well as his loyal assistant, Tessa. Buckman, no longer having a use for Shaw, orders a Sentinel attack on Shaw and his allies, resulting in the death of Shaw's lover Lourdes Chantel. That night, Shaw and Emma Frost purge the entire Council of the Chosen, remaking it as the Lords Cardinal and appointing themselves Black King and White Queen.

Shaw's Inner Circle soon turn their attentions to the X-Men, kidnapping several of their number. Mastermind, as Jason Wyngarde, is made a probationary member and manipulates Jean Grey, resulting in her transformation into the Dark Phoenix.

Despite such setbacks, the Inner Circle continues to pursue its agenda. Shaw secures a government contract for Shaw Industries to manufacture Sentinels, profiting from the state of fear concerning the "mutant menace" despite secretly being a mutant himself. Meanwhile, Frost runs the Massachusetts Academy, a prestigious preparatory school affiliated with the Hellfire Club that secretly trained a team of young mutants, known as the Hellions. The Inner Circle also underwent some personnel changes, notably the expulsion of Donald Pierce for conspiring against his mutant colleagues, and the addition of Selene as Black Queen.

Kade Kilgore takes control of the Hellfire Club for a time and founds the Hellfire Academy, recruiting mutant outlaws as its faculty and looking for students to attend this school. The Hellfire Academy serves as the direct opponent for the Jean Grey School for Higher Learning.

== Organization ==
=== Lord Imperial ===
The Lord Imperial is the true leader of the Hellfire Club and oversees all branches of it. As such, only a few individuals have held the title. Sir Gordon Phillips, while unknown at the time, ruled as Lord Imperial for most of the club's modern history, holding the position from before the club's introduction until his death: killed by Sabretooth on a cruise ship filled with humans infected with the Legacy Virus.

- Sir Gordon Phillips
- Elias Bogan
- Sebastian Shaw
- Roberto da Costa (Sunspot)

=== Inner Circle ===
The constant intrigue, backstabbing, blackmailing and politicking that plague the Hellfire Club have resulted in many changes of the Inner Circle, as new players seek out membership in order to obtain influence, power and wealth. The following lists the membership of each incarnation of the Inner Circle and the title they held; in descending order of rank are Kings and Queens, followed by Bishops and Rooks.

==== The Council of the Chosen ====
The original Inner Circle (existing prior to the club's introduction) consisted of:

- Edward Buckman - White King
- Paris Seville - White Queen
- Sebastian Shaw - Black Bishop

Sebastian Shaw is instrumental in the Hellfire Club's funding of Stephen Lang's resurrected Sentinel program, but having completed his purpose, White King Edward Buckman sought to eliminate the ambitious Black Bishop. After a Sentinel attack on Shaw's beach house results in the death of his lover Lourdes Chantel, Shaw and Emma Frost purge the Council and appoint themselves Black King and White Queen.

==== The Lords Cardinal ====
Shaw renames the Council of the Chosen as The Lords Cardinal following his takeover of the New York branch, and appoints a number of allies to key positions. Frost began running the Massachusetts Academy at this time. Jason Wyngarde, also known as Mastermind, becomes a probationary member of the Lords Cardinal.

- Sebastian Shaw - Black King
- Emma Frost - White Queen
- Donald Pierce - White Bishop
- Harry Leland - Black Bishop
- Jason Wyngarde (Mastermind) - A probationary member who was presumably intended for one of the two Rooks.
- Phoenix (posing as Jean Grey) - Black Queen
- Tessa - Shaw's personal aide.
- Warhawk - Associate of the Hellfire Club.

Following Mastermind's failed subversion of Jean Grey, the title of Black Queen is once again empty. Donald Pierce reaches the rank of White King, but is later expelled for conspiring against his mutant colleagues. New members appointed during this period were:

- Selene - Black Queen
- Friedrich von Roehm - Black Rook
- Emmanuel da Costa - White Rook

A truce between the Hellfire Club and the X-Men is formed after Leland and von Roehm are killed in battle with Nimrod. This truce becomes a formal alliance as Storm and Magneto, as the leaders of the X-Men and Xavier's school respectively, take over the shared position of White King.

- Storm - White King (with Magneto)
- Magneto - White King, later Grey King

White Rook Emmanuel da Costa is poisoned and killed by Gideon, who believes that either da Costa's son Roberto (Sunspot) or Cannonball are part of the Externals, a subset of mutants who possess immortality. After Cannonball survives a near-fatal stabbing, Gideon turns on Sunspot, who is rescued by X-Force.

==== Shinobi Shaw's Upstart Inner Circle ====
Selene had originally planned on creating a new Inner Circle with the help of the Upstarts - among them Shinobi Shaw, son of Sebastian Shaw - but they betray and imprison her. Believing to have successfully assassinated his father, Shinobi Shaw briefly takes over the New York branch of the Club, seemingly with support from Candra.

- Shinobi Shaw - Black King
- Benedict Kine - White King
- Benazir Kaur - White Queen
- Reeva Payge - Black Queen
- Candra - Associate
- Cordelia Frost - Probationary member
- Ebon Knights - Shinobi Shaw's Black Guard
- Ivory Knights - Benedict Kine's White Guard

==== The London Branch ====
The Hellfire Club's London branch is introduced briefly operating parallel to Shinobi's Inner Circle. Instead of Black and White, the titles of the London Inner Circle are designated Black and Red.

- Emma Steed - Black Queen
- Margali Szardos - Red Queen
- Quentin Templeton - Black King
- Alan Wilson - Red King
- Brian Braddock (Captain Britain) - Black Bishop
- Conrad Strathdee - Red Bishop
- Jane Hampshire (possessed by Mountjoy) - Red Rook
- Rutledge - Servant

Captain Britain, having inherited club membership from his father James Braddock, is asked by Shinobi Shaw to infiltrate the London Inner Circle, as the branch's mysterious agenda runs counter to both their interests. The London Branch and their plans are brought to an end after a failed attempt to use a demon's essence to control the city. The Black Queen and Red King are taken into police custody.

==== Shaw's Second Circle ====
Sebastian Shaw retakes control of the Hellfire Club in attempt to restore its former power and glory. Selene, freed from her imprisonment by the Upstarts, takes under her influence a resurrected Madelyne Pryor in her quest for revenge. Meeting in New York, Shaw proposes a reformation of the Inner Circle. Initially operating in secret from outside the Hellfire Club (still under Shinobi Shaw's control), Sebastian Shaw's group soon reasserts control over the organization.

- Sebastian Shaw - Black King
- Selene - Black Queen
- Trevor Fitzroy - White Rook
- Madelyne Pryor - Red Queen
- Donald Pierce - Applicant for White Bishop
- Tessa - Shaw's personal aide
- Ella - Selene's personal servant
- Holocaust - Associate
- Miss Hoo - Associate

Selene's mind control over Madelyne Pryor eventually wanes, and the Black Rook's allegiance turns to Sebastian Shaw. Concerned, Selene contacts Fitzroy and Tessa to counteract the changing balance of power. Donald Pierce returns to the Hellfire Club as a probationary member, however his failure in attaining the alien technology of Apocalypse results in his expulsion from the group. Meanwhile, Pryor betrays and deserts the club. Shaw, presented with a mysterious offer, resigns from the Inner Circle, advising Fitzroy to do the same.

==== Selene's Hellfire Club ====
Selene, the sole remaining member of the Inner Circle, reforms the club in her own image and forms an alliance with Blackheart. After a confrontation with the Fantastic Four, Blackheart is imprisoned and Selene's captive Daimon Hellstrom is freed; Hellstrom becomes the club's White King to ensure a balance of power and light. Selene inducts Sunspot into the Inner Circle, offering the resurrection of his long-dead girlfriend Julianna.

- Selene - Black Queen
- Blackheart - Black King
- Daimon Hellstrom - White King
- Roberto da Costa (Sunspot) - Black Rook

It is unknown what led to the dissolution of this incarnation. The Hellfire Club was found closed and abandoned, covered in blackbriar thorns; Selene herself was trapped inside the mansion, unable to leave.

==== The Fifth Inner Circle ====
After the death of Sir Gordon Phillips at the hands of the Brotherhood of Mutants, Sebastian Shaw positions himself as the new Lord Imperial and, as such, oversees the entire Hellfire Club.

- Sebastian Shaw - Lord Imperial
- Roberto da Costa (Sunspot) - Black King
- Selene - Black Queen
- Sat-Yr-9 (Courtney Ross) - White Queen
- Viper - White Warrior Princess
- Tessa - Shaw's personal aide and Sunspot's personal adviser.
- Red Lotus - Associate

Selene, despite remaining imprisoned underneath the Hellfire Club's New York mansion and not actively participating in the Inner Circle, has apparently retained her title of Black Queen. It was also revealed that Emma Frost, despite having left the club long ago and having since joined the X-Men, still retains her membership and White Queen title. Sat-Yr-9 confronts Frost and, assuming her title, becomes the newest addition to the Inner Circle, bringing with her bodyguard and self-appointed "White Warrior Princess" Viper.

A confrontation with Donald Pierce leaves Sebastian Shaw gravely injured, and Sunspot takes over as Lord Imperial, which was Tessa's plan all along. Tessa leaves the Club, still under Sunspot's rule, and joined New Excalibur in the wake of M-Day. Shaw has since returned as the Black King, seemingly plotting to rebuild his power base.

During the same period, Sat-Yr-9 sends Viper to command an attack on Zanzibar, which she does with the help of the piratical militia the Weaponeers. However, Viper is betrayed by the Weaponeers and makes a truce with mutants from the rebuilding nation of Genosha against her former allies.

==== Nova's Inner Circle ====
Emma Frost's illusory Inner Circle (left to right): Negasonic Teenage Warhead, Perfection, Cassandra Nova, and Sebastian Shaw

- Emma Frost
- Sebastian Shaw
- Perfection
- Cassandra Nova
- Negasonic Teenage Warhead

A mysterious new Inner Circle appears in the third volume of Astonishing X-Men. Members of this version were never given titles, since they were revealed to be psionic projections created by Emma Frost at the behest of Cassandra Nova. In an attempt to free herself from confinement by the X-Men, Cassandra had placed a portion of her consciousness in Frost's prior to being mentally imprisoned, and launched an assault on the X-Mansion using Frost as a Trojan horse. Other than Nova, each member appears to represent a different aspect of Frost's past, with Negasonic Teenage Warhead being a former student of hers who died in Genosha; Perfection, a manifestation of Frost's younger, evil self; and Sebastian Shaw representing her time with the Hellfire Club.

==== Selene's second Inner Circle ====
Membership consisted of:

- Blink
- Senyaka
- Mortis
- Wither
- Eli Bard - The group's only non-mutant member. Bard was turned into a vampire-like creature by Selene.

==== The Sixth Inner Circle ====
Sebastian Shaw's Inner Circle eventually reemerges. Wolverine comes into confrontation with a new "Inner Circle", under the false impression (by Sebastian Shaw and Miss Sinister) that they are behind the kidnapping of his son, Daken.

- Sebastian Shaw
- Claudine Renko (Miss Sinister)
- Mr. Castlemere
- Turner
- Peter Scholl (Leonine)
- Mercedes

==== The Seventh Inner Circle ====
In the event "Schism", there is a pro-human coup in the Hellfire Club, all mutant members have been removed, and Kade Kilgore is named the new Black King. Kilgore assembles a cabal of prepubescent geniuses to secretly rule the Hellfire Club and eradicate mutantkind, then proceeding to poison the other remaining Hellfire Club members, making them the sole leadership. Kilgore later has a change of heart and began recruiting mutants to his side to train mutants at the Hellfire Academy. The Hellfire Academy is destroyed by the staff of the Jean Grey School.

- Kade Kilgore - Black King. A twelve-year-old sociopath who is also the leader of the group.
- Doctor Maximilian Frankenstein (formerly Baron Maximilian von Katzenelnbogen) - Black Bishop. Descendant of Victor Frankenstein. He was responsible for creating the Krakoa that the X-Men befriended and the Krakoas that defended the unnamed island where the Hellfire Academy is located.
- Manuel Enduque - White King. He is well-versed in weaponry with his family reportedly being a dynasty of slavers in Africa with Manuel having strangled his own father to death, thus resulting in him taking control of the business.
- Wilhemina Kensington - White Queen. She is an eleven year old with a love of martial arts and beauty pageants who inherited the company after her mother died. She is also both psychopathic and sociopathic, having killed human guards and alien warriors and is also alleged to have mutilated both cats and penguins.

Associates

- Sabretooth
- Ezekiel Stane
- Kid Blackheart
- Cordelia Frost
- Szandor Shaw
- Kevin Krask
- Kenneth Krask
- Wolfgang von Roehm

==== The Eighth Inner Circle ====
Sebastian Shaw has since regained control of the Hellfire Club and in an attempt to restore its former power and glory, allies himself with Magneto and his X-Men branch to form a new Inner Circle.

- Sebastian Shaw - Black King
- Briar Raleigh - Black Bishop - Magneto's former associate and the only non-mutant within the Inner Circle
- Monet St. Croix - White Queen
- Black Tom Cassidy - White Bishop

==== The Ninth Inner Circle ====
- Black King: Emma Frost
- White King: Mystique
- Black Bishop: Elixir
- Black Rook: Marrow

==== The Tenth Inner Circle ====
- Kade Kilgore - Black King
- Manuel Enduque - White King
- Chen Zhao - White Bishop
- Maximilian Frankenstein - Black Bishop
- X-Cutioner
- Donald Pierce
- Hate-Monger
- Yellowjacket

=== Members ===
The following characters are members of the Hellfire Club, many of them being extremely influential, but were not part of any of the Inner Circle incarnations mentioned above. Membership is either hereditary, or obtained through personal invitation from the branch's King. Known members include:

- Warren Worthington Jr. and Kathryn Worthington (both deceased) - invited by Ned Buckman
- Howard Stark (deceased) - invited by Ned Buckman
- Sir James Braddock (deceased) - invited by Ned Buckman, former Black Bishop of the London Branch, left the Inner Circle when his inventions were used for anti-mutant purposes.
- Senator Robert Kelly (deceased)
- Warren Worthington III (Angel) - inherited membership from his father.
- Candace "Candy" Southern (deceased)
- Elizabeth Braddock (Psylocke) - inherited membership.
- James Braddock Jr. - inherited membership.
- Berhard Van Ostamgen - failed entry into Inner Circle
- Ronald Parvenue
- Dwayne Taylor (Night Thrasher)
- Anthony Stark (Iron Man) - inherited membership from his father
- Norman Osborn (Green Goblin)
- Bianca LeNeige
- Vance Astrovik
- Oliver Ryland - Elias Bogan's protégé
- The Kingmaker
- Rachel Summers - White Warrior Princess, invited by Emma Frost
- Lady Jacqueline Falsworth-Crichton - inherited membership
- Angus Munroe - deceased

==== Past members ====
- Philadelphia, 1780/81: Sir Patrick Clemens (King title), Lady Diana Knight (Queen title), Lady Grey (Queen title), Elizabeth Shaw-Worthington, Major General Wallace Worthington, Commander Clinton
- London, 1859: Lord Braddock, Mr. Shaw (Sebastian Shaw's great-grandfather and Cornelius Shaw's father)
- Boston, 1872/74: Anton Pierce (Member of the Inner Circle)
- London, 1915: Brigadier-General Cornelius Shaw, Sir Harry Manners, Waltham Pierce

=== Staff ===
The Hellfire Club has employed a large number of mostly-anonymous armed guards. A few have been named:

- Wade Cole
- Angelo Macon
- Murray Reese
- Samuel Guthrie (Cannonball)
- Richard Salmons
- Randall Chase
- Chet Andrews

Cole, Macon and Reese are savagely wounded by Wolverine in the Hellfire Club's first confrontation with the X-Men. They would return to duty as cyborgs before leaving the Club to join Lady Deathstrike in seeking revenge against Wolverine, eventually joining the Reavers. Kade Kilgore recruits two survivors of private military company Blackguard as his personal bodyguards.

The Hellfire Club also employs a number of servants, escorts and strippers. Sharon Kelly was a waitress at the New York branch who was chosen by Sebastian Shaw to seduce Robert Kelly. The couple quickly married, Sharon was killed in a battle involving the X-Men, further fueling her husband's hatred for mutants.

=== Massachusetts Academy ===
The Hellfire Club is aligned with the prestigious prep school the Massachusetts Academy, run by Emma Frost, for a number of years. In addition to its large, traditional, student body, the Academy secretly trains a team of young mutants known as the Hellions. Due to their affiliation with the Club, the Hellions are often present at its social functions. This group had a rivalry with Professor Charles Xavier's students at the time, the New Mutants.

After the death of the Hellions in an attack by the Upstarts, Frost leaves the Hellfire Club. Re-aligning herself with Professor Xavier, the Massachusetts Academy becomes the new site for Xavier's School for Gifted Youngsters and a new class, known as Generation X.

=== Hellfire Academy ===
The seventh incarnation of the Hellfire Club have since founded the Hellfire Academy, a rival to the Jean Grey School for Higher Learning. It is located on an unnamed island. According to Kade Kilgore, the purpose of recruiting newly empowered mutants is to train them to be supervillains so he can then profit from the fear generated by them through his Sentinel program.

==== Staff members ====
Staff outside the Hellfire Club's leadership include:

- Mystique - Headmistress who also teaches Intro to Evil. Joined in Wolverine and the X-Men #20.
- Sabretooth - Headmaster. Joined in Wolverine and the X-Men #3.
- Dog Logan - Brother of Wolverine. He teaches physical education. Joined in Wolverine and the X-Men #29.
- Dr. Xanto Starblood - Self-proclaimed Extreme Zoologist who teaches xenobiology. Joined in Wolverine and the X-Men #30
- Husk - Former X-Man. She is the lunch lady and librarian. Joined sometime after Wolverine and the X-Men #19.; later rejoined X-Men
- Lord Deathstrike - Brother of Lady Deathstrike who works as a recruited resourcer. Joined in Wolverine and the X-Men #20.
- Master Pandemonium - He teaches Hell Literature. Joined in Wolverine and the X-Men #20.
- Madame Mondo - Female member of the Spineless Ones from the Mojoverse. She works as the Public Relations teacher. Joined in Wolverine and the X-Men #20.
- Sauron - He works as a science teacher. Joined in Wolverine and the X-Men #20.
- Silver Samurai -The son of the original Silver Samurai who works as a designer. Joined in Wolverine and the X-Men #20.
- The Philistine - A man who was transformed by the Siege Perilous. Joined in Wolverine and the X-Men #20.
- Toad - Joined in Wolverine and the X-Men #30.; left in Wolverine and the X-Men #33; later rejoined X-Men
- Wendigo - A Wendigo works as a Danger Room Instructor. Joined in Wolverine and the X-Men #20.

==== Students ====
The students of the Hellfire Academy include:

- Broo - Joined in Wolverine and the X-Men #30; later rejoined X-Men
- Glob Herman - Joined prior to Wolverine and the X-Men #18
- Infestation - Joined in Wolverine and the X-Men #31
- Mudbug - Joined in Wolverine and the X-Men #20
- Oya - Joined in Wolverine and the X-Men #29; left in Wolverine and the X-Men #33; later rejoined X-Men
- Kid Omega - Joined in Wolverine and the X-Men #30; left in Wolverine and the X-Men #32; later rejoined X-Men
- Snot - Joined in Wolverine and the X-Men #31
- Tin Man - Joined in X-Men vol. 3 #41

=== Hellfire Trading Company ===
In the wake of the establishment of the mutant nation of Krakoa in the 2019 series House of X and Powers of X, Emma Frost reforms the Club and reorganizes it into the Hellfire Trading Company, a distributor for Krakoan drugs. The company's ships the Marauder, the Upstart and the Mercury perform public delivery of mutant goods, while also smuggling drugs illicitly and freeing mutants from unfriendly nations.

- White Palace
  - White Queen: Stepford Cuckoos: Emma Frost (formerly)
  - White Bishop: Christian Frost
  - White Knight: Callisto
- Blackstone
  - Black Queen: Lourdes Chantel; Sebastian Shaw (formerly Black King)
  - Black Bishop: Shinobi Shaw
  - Black Knights: Andrea and Andreas Strucker
- Red Keep
  - Red Queen: Katherine Pryde
  - Red Bishop: Lucas Bishop

== Other versions ==
=== Bishop's Future ===
The Hellfire Club retains its position as one of the world's major powers in the future timeline of Bishop. The Club is ruled by Anthony Shaw, a descendant of Sebastian Shaw; he also has an illegitimate son, Trevor Fitzroy. Malcolm, a colleague of Bishop and member of Xavier's Security Enforcers (X.S.E.), was also a member of the Club.

=== Clan Hellfire ===
In a future dominated by Trevor Fitzroy, one of the forces opposing his rule is Clan Hellfire, led by Samara Shaw.

=== X-Men: Ronin ===
In one alternate reality in which the X-Men are based in Japan, the Hellfire Club is ruled by Professor Xavier. The White Queen Emma Frost is a junior member who, along with Tessa, believes Xavier to be their biological father. The Club controls the Shadowcat Clan of ninjas, which includes Pyro, Iceman and Colossus.

=== Marvel Noir ===
In X-Men Noir, the Hellfire Club is an exclusive S&M club owned by Sebastian Shaw.

=== Ultimate Marvel ===
An alternate universe iteration of the Hellfire Club appears in the Ultimate Marvel imprint, led by Sebastian Shaw and consisting of Gerald Lavine, Shinobi Shaw, and Emma Frost. This version of the group worship a pagan "Phoenix God", who they believe to be incarnated in the body of Jean Grey.

=== Ultimate Universe ===
An alternate universe iteration of the Hellfire Club appears in the Ultimate Universe imprint, with Emmanuel da Costa as Black King.

== In other media ==
=== Television ===
- The Inner Circle Club appears in X-Men: The Animated Series, consisting of Sebastian Shaw, Jason Wyngarde, Emma Frost, Donald Pierce, and Harry Leland. Following a cameo appearance in the episode "The Phoenix Saga - Part IV", they attempt to brainwash Jean Grey into joining them during the four-part episode "The Dark Phoenix". After being foiled, Shaw, Pierce, and Frost escape while Wyngarde is left catatonic and Leland goes missing following a fight with Wolverine.
- The Inner Circle appears in Wolverine and the X-Men, consisting of Sebastian Shaw, Harry Leland, Donald Pierce, Selene, Emma Frost, and the Stepford Cuckoos. Similarly to the Ultimate Marvel incarnation, this version of the group seek to gain the Phoenix Force's power. After spending most of the series infiltrating the X-Men to locate Jean Grey, Frost kidnaps her so the Inner Circle can perform a ritual to extract the Phoenix Force and place it into the Stepford Cuckoos. However, they are unable to control it, leading to Leland and Pierce being killed by falling debris while Frost subdues Shaw and Selene before sacrificing herself to release the Phoenix Force into space.
- The Inner Circle appears in Marvel Anime: X-Men, consisting of Jason Wyngarde; Rat (voiced by Manabu Sakamaki in the Japanese version and by Michael Sinterniklaas in the English dub), who can project metal discs from his body; Marsh (voiced by Yuichi Nakamura in the Japanese version and by Mary Elizabeth McGlynn in the English dub), who can dissolve into liquid; and Neuron / White Bishop (voiced by Yutaka Aoyama in the Japanese version and by Dave Wittenberg in the English dub), who possesses a shell and can amplify a target's senses via strips from his body. Additionally, Harry Leland and Emma Frost appear as members of the group in flashbacks. Following a failed attempt to manipulate Jean Grey into using the Phoenix Force for their purposes before she sacrificed herself to stop them, the Inner Circle attempt to use a reality-warping mutant named Takeo Sasaki. However, Rat, Marsh, and Neuron are killed by the X-Men while Wyngarde is killed by Takeo.
- A live-action television series titled Hellfire was in development at 20th Century Fox Television and Marvel Television, with an early 2017 airdate. However, on July 12, 2016, Variety reported that the project is no longer moving forward.
- The Hellfire Club appears in The Gifted, consisting of Reeva Payge, the Frost sisters, Andy Strucker, Lorna Dane, Fade, and Sage. Under Payge, this version of the group pursues mutant liberation.

=== Film ===
The Hellfire Club appears in X-Men: First Class, led by Sebastian Shaw and consisting of Emma Frost, Azazel, Riptide, and Angel Salvadore. This version of the group seeks to cause World War III to accelerate mutant evolution and create a new world order with mutants as Earth's dominant species and Shaw as their leader. To this end, they manipulate American and Soviet government officials into instigating the Cuban Missile Crisis, prompting CIA agent Moira MacTaggert to supervise the initial formation of the X-Men to oppose them. Ultimately, Shaw is killed by Erik Lehnsherr, who unites the remaining Hellfire Club members under his leadership.

=== Video games ===
The Hellfire Club appears in:

- X-Men, with Sebastian Shaw as a prominent member and boss.
- X-Men: Gamesmaster's Legacy, with Shinobi Shaw as a prominent member and boss.
- Wolverine: Adamantium Rage, with Selene and Shinobi Shaw as prominent members.
- Marvel Avengers Alliance, with Selene and Sebastian Shaw as prominent members, Emma Frost as a former member, and various foot soldiers as minor members.
