= Sebastian Shaw (character) =

Marvel Comics supervillain

Sebastian Hiram Shaw Black King
- Sebastian Shaw; Art by John Cassaday

Publication information
- Publisher: Marvel Comics
- First appearance: The Uncanny X-Men #129 (January 1980)
- Created by: Chris Claremont; John Byrne

In-story information
- Full name: Sebastian Hiram Shaw
- Species: Human mutant
- Place of origin: Pittsburgh, Pennsylvania
- Team affiliations: Marauders; Hellfire Club; Shaw Industries; Quiet Council of Krakoa
- Notable aliases: Black King; Lord Imperial; Black Bishop; The Creator
- Abilities: Energy absorption; Possesses access to sophisticated weaponry and telepathic blocking technology; Expert hand-to-hand combatant; Master tactician

Sebastian Hiram Shaw is a supervillain appearing in American comic books published by Marvel Comics. He has been frequently depicted as an adversary of the X-Men.

A mutant, Shaw possesses the ability to absorb energy and transform it into his own raw strength. He is the leader of the New York branch of the Hellfire Club, an exclusive secret society composed of mutants bent on world domination, although to the public, he is a legitimate businessman and ordinary human. He once funded the mutant-hunting Sentinel program to keep it under his thumb.

Kevin Bacon portrays Shaw in the 2011 film X-Men: First Class.

== Publication history ==
Created by writer Chris Claremont and artist/co-writer John Byrne, Sebastian Shaw first appeared in The Uncanny X-Men #129 (Jan. 1980), during the "Dark Phoenix Saga" storyline. John Byrne based the appearance of Sebastian Shaw on British actor Robert Shaw, who had died in 1978.

== Fictional character biography ==
Sebastian Shaw was born in Pittsburgh, Pennsylvania. His mutant abilities first manifested shortly after he was accepted to engineering school and his father Jacob Shaw died after he contracted an incurable disease due to genetic manipulation by Mister Sinister. Sebastian devoted himself to his studies and created Shaw Industries, becoming a millionaire by age 30 and a billionaire by age 40.

=== Joining the Hellfire Club ===
Shaw becomes engaged to Lourdes Chantel, also a mutant. He is soon initiated into the Hellfire Club thanks to his vast fortune, having caught the attention of Ned Buckman, then White King of Hellfire Club's New York branch. Shaw becomes part of the Council of the Chosen, earning the rank of Black Bishop. Chantel does not trust Buckman, and feared that Shaw's ambition and the nature of the Hellfire Club would corrupt him.

=== Taking over ===
Chantel is seemingly killed by Sentinels in a battle. Upon discovering that Ned Buckman is supporting Steven Lang's Project: Armageddon, Shaw executes a coup, using Emma Frost's telepathy to make Buckman kill all the Council of the Chosen and then himself. Shaw proclaims himself Black King, remakes the Council of the Chosen into his Inner Circle, and gathers Frost, Harry Leland and Donald Pierce as the Lords Cardinal of Hellfire Club.

As the leader of the Hellfire Club, Shaw starts plans to dominate the world through force, money and power. His connections to top officials of corporations and government, acquired via the club and through his position as CEO of Shaw Industries, make him a powerful enemy. Shaw becomes a major supporter and builder of Sentinels. This activity brings him into frequent contact with Robert Kelly and Henry Peter Gyrich, to whom he appears to be an anti-mutant bigot.

=== Meeting the X-Men ===
Shaw sets his eyes on the X-Men, scheming to capture and study them for use in breeding an army of powerful mutants for the Hellfire Club. He employs the superpowered assassin Warhawk to plant a bug in Cerebro, ensuring the Hellfire Club would be aware of newly manifested mutants at the same moment as the X-Men themselves, as well as giving them access to secret details of their powers and fighting techniques. However, the club's operatives prove ineffective at defeating the X-Men in the field, and the first two mutants they locate in this manner are lost.

Now aware of the Hellfire Club's existence, the X-Men infiltrate their headquarters, but are defeated and captured. However, the X-Men escape before Shaw can put them to use. Shaw's control of the Hellfire Club grows more tenuous as Pierce proves to be a mutant-hating traitor, and a new recruit to the Inner Circle, Selene, sets her sights on replacing Shaw as the chairman. The Hellfire Club is forced to battle alongside the X-Men against Nimrod. Though the group emerges victorious, Hellfire Club members Harry Leland and Friedrich von Roehm die in the fight. After the battle, the Hellfire Club and the X-Men become allies of sorts, with Magneto and Storm filling the position of White King. Shaw is ousted from the Hellfire Club by Magneto, Selene, and Frost, who view his support of the Sentinels as endangering the group.

=== Keeping in power ===
Months later, Shaw is attacked by his son, Shinobi Shaw, and apparently killed. Shinobi becomes the new Black King of Hellfire Club. However, Shaw survives and joins a new Inner Circle alongside Selene, Madelyne Pryor, and Trevor Fitzroy.

Shaw contacts the mutant Holocaust, who had crossed over from the "Age of Apocalypse" timeline. In exchange for a new armored containment suit, Holocaust agreed to help Shaw capture X-Force, which he does with ease. Shaw has telepathically brainwash X-Force to hunt down Cable, but Cable uses his telepathy to break the conditioning and free his team. Shaw's relationship with Holocaust declines soon after.

After Professor X is "outed" as a mutant, Shaw apparently returns to his capitalist roots and converts the NY branch of the Hellfire Club into a strip club, which is actually a safe haven for mutants. After a few months, Shaw aims to become the new Lord Imperial of the entire club worldwide, and invites Sage to help him. Shaw also invites Courtney Ross and Sunspot to join him as the White Queen and Black King. All three accept, but Sage betrays Shaw. Shaw is wounded by Pierce, but manages to knock Pierce's head off. However, Shaw is too hurt to maintain his club position and is replaced by Sunspot, who becomes Lord Imperial of the Hellfire Club.

=== Mister Sinister and the Cronus Machine ===
Shaw attends a Hellfire Club dinner hosted by Sunspot and is alerted to a device left to him by his father exploding elsewhere in the compound resulting in the insanity of two club menials and Shaw asking his manservant for a file labelled "Kronos". After being upbraided over the explosion and deaths by Sunspot, he is ordered to investigate. The explosion in the Hellfire Club was caused by the activation of a machine developed beneath the Alamogordo genetics plant in Las Cruces, New Mexico by Mister Sinister. In the past, Sinister worked at Alamogordo alongside Brian Xavier (Professor X's father), Kurt Marko (Juggernaut's father), and Irene Adler who had been gathered for him by Jacob Shaw, Sebastian's father, as they all had the X-gene and Sinister predicted their children would be mutants. Sinister then experimented of these children (including Marko, Xavier, and Sebastian himself), imprinting himself on their DNA. Sinister's machine, dubbed the Cronus device, was designed to activate soon after his death and would activate these hidden copies until Sinister could be reborn in one of them. Jacob, wanting to protect his son, created the device in the Hellfire Club from Sinister's notes to alert and protect Sebastian from the Cronus device. Shaw travels to New Mexico to visit another of the children to confirm his theory, running into Xavier and Gambit who were investigating a hit list with the children's names on it. However, Xavier is captured by Amanda Mueller, a former associate of Sinister. Mueller wants to house the powers (though not the personality) of Sinister herself and so is assassinating the children, having undergone the procedure herself. She shoots Xavier, who is already struggling to stop Sinister from taking over his body, which allows him to take over. Sinister in Xavier's body stops Mueller, but is in turn confronted by Shaw and Gambit, who destroy the Cronus device while Xavier casts Sinister out of his mind. With the threat gone, Shaw leaves.

=== Dark Reign ===
During Frost's early days as the White Queen, Sebastian Shaw sends her to convince Namor to join the Hellfire Club. Instead, Namor takes Frost to his kingdom and they begin a relationship. Believing Frost to have betrayed him for Namor, Shaw sends a reprogrammed Sentinel to Atlantis, attacking the two and destroying the kingdom. As Namor confronts Shaw for his treachery, Selene takes telepathic hold of Frost, erasing her memories of Namor, who vows revenge on Shaw. In the present, Frost reveals that her initial battle with Phoenix unlocked her memories of Namor. She makes a pact with him, seducing Shaw and using her telepathy to make Namor believe she has executed him, while secretly telepathically incapacitating Shaw. Per their deal, Namor vows to protect mutant-kind as his own people, while Frost, more determined to fill her role as a leader of mutant-kind, contacts Cyclops to have Shaw captured by the X-Men for "crimes against mutant-kind." Approaching him later in his cell, Frost reveals that she has captured Shaw for Namor and on the basis that the Sentinels he commissioned were ones later used by Cassandra Nova to destroy Genosha. She sentences him to remember nothing but the faces of the Genoshan victims using her telepathy.

=== Utopia ===
Due to Namor's presence on Utopia, Emma Frost realizes that Shaw's continued existence poses a threat to her agreement with Namor. She decides to finally kill him, but her plans are exposed when Shadowcat accidentally picks up her thoughts during a psi-conversation between her and Colossus. While disgusted at Frost's intended actions, Shadowcat offers her a compromise. As she currently exists as a ghost, she is the perfect tool for making Shaw disappear.

Fantomex, Shadowcat and Frost take Shaw aboard E.V.A., whilst they work out how to dispose of him. Frost wakes Shaw up and asks him to recount the early days of the Hellfire Club. Frost and two other dancers were once close friends, when one night, Shaw offered Frost the position of Queen. The only stipulation was that one of the two girls had to die. She stated she did not care which one was killed and watched as Shaw proceeded to kill both. In the present day, Frost starts to question Shaw further when Fantomex, bored with Frost's recounts of her history, drops the floor from under Shaw. Frost goes into a rage at Fantomex, as Fantomex was unaware that Shaw could absorb energy, such as that from hitting the ground from such heights.

Shaw proceeds to engage Frost's group, stating that he would rather die than see Frost go on breathing a moment longer. Helped by a maimed Fantomex, the former White Queen tricks Shaw into allowing her into his mind, and wipes his memory.

=== Avengers vs. X-Men ===
After the Avengers invaded Utopia in Avengers vs. X-Men, Shaw along with the kids in Utopia were taken to the Avengers Academy. It is revealed that Shaw read the file on him and now knows everything about his past, although he claims not to remember it. Wolverine distrusts Shaw and insists that he should be imprisoned. Shaw relents and is imprisoned in a cell that absorbs kinetic energy, meaning that Shaw would be unable to break it by building up his own kinetic energy by punching it. Shaw however, asks for books to keep him occupied and uses a book to hit himself for 8 hours straight, allowing him to build up enough energy to break out of the cell and into the storm drain. Elsewhere, the young mutants from Utopia confront the Academy students. When Shaw encounters the Academy students, X-23 and Finesse warn them that Shaw intends to help the mutant children escape. After both sides agree that the mutant children should not be confined against their will, they fake a battle to justify their escape in front of the cameras at the Academy.

=== Residing on Krakoa ===
In the Krakoan Age, beginning with the dual miniseries House of X and Powers of X, Shaw joins the Quiet Council of Krakoa, the ruling body of Krakoa. He is also part of the Hellfire Trading Company, responsible for smuggling Krakoa's new remedies through the black market. In addition, Shaw is a member of the Marauders.

When the anti-mutant organization Orchis mounts a successful offensive on Krakoa, simultaneously framing the mutants for sabotaging the drugs they had been giving humans to suggest they had been trying to kill innocent people, Shaw openly defects from Krakoa to assist Orchis. However, he is driven off by Charles Xavier.

Sebastian Shaw holds the Hellfire Gala at the location of Manhattan's Hellfire Club after escaping from Graymalkin Prison. Amidst the masquerade party, Shaw is murdered by Mystique and her accomplices. Destiny states that Shaw was going to use Forge's X-Gene-cancelling technology as a weapon. After learning this, Wolverine allows the perpetrators to escape and covers up the events.

== Powers and abilities ==
Shaw is a mutant with the ability to absorb all kinetic and thermal energy directed at him and use it to augment his strength, speed, stamina and recuperation capabilities to superhuman levels. He absorbs the energy of any impact he is struck by, including not only direct physical blows, but also the impact of bullets, throwing weapons, and concussive energy. His speed is the attribute most dramatically increased by his power; after absorbing enough energy he can attack more quickly than opponents can react. He is sometimes shown to be capable of absorbing the cutting, piercing and thrusting energy from a blade. His powers can enable his body to withstand cutting from adamantium, but only for a short time.

In the past, Shaw has been limited to a certain amount of energy and would lose consciousness when he surpassed his capabilities. Subsequently, however, Shaw has been shown to now be able to take in an indefinite amount of energy without any ill effects. The power he absorbs dissipates over time, and exposure to the elements causes it to drain rapidly. Without any absorbed energy, Shaw is merely a strong ordinary human in excellent physical condition, but he regularly works to keep his strength at a superhuman level. In one instance, he was shown to spend time hitting a wall after waking to build up his power reserves before starting the day. Shaw also can forgo sleep if he receives enough energy. Often he will have his mercenaries pummel him so that he would not need to sleep for some time.

Shaw also has a successful business acumen and access to sophisticated weaponry. He not only prides himself on his power and the connections it allows him, but on knowing his opponents and how best to defeat them, whether in battle or in business. He also possesses technology that can block telepathic intrusions by Professor X.

== Reception ==
In 2009, Shaw was placed on a list of 100 comic book villains as #55 by IGN.

== Other versions ==
Many alternate universe versions of Sebastian Shaw have appeared throughout the character's publication history.

- In Age of Apocalypse, Shaw is an aristocrat and servant of Apocalypse until he is poisoned and killed by Donald Pierce.
- In House of M, Shaw became the director of S.H.I.E.L.D. and repurposed the Sentinels to protect mutants.
- In the Ultimate Marvel universe, Shaw is the leader of the Hellfire Club, a secret society that worships the Phoenix God.
- In X-Men Noir, Shaw is a powerful politician who commands the Brotherhood.

== In other media ==
=== Television ===
- Sebastian Shaw appears in the X-Men: The Animated Series four-part episode "The Dark Phoenix", voiced by David Bryant. This version is a member of the Inner Circle Club.
  - Shaw appears in X-Men '97, voiced by Travis Willingham. As of this series, he became a member of Genosha's ruling council before he is killed amidst a Sentinel invasion.
- Sebastian Shaw appears in Wolverine and the X-Men, voiced by Graham McTavish. This version is a member of the Inner Circle.

=== Film ===
Kevin Bacon as Sebastian Shaw in X-Men: First Class

Sebastian Shaw appears in X-Men: First Class, portrayed by Kevin Bacon. This version possesses the additional ability to utilize kinetic energy as sustenance, maintain his youth and life, and fire energy blasts. Additionally, he is fluent in English, German, French, and Russian and previously operated as Nazi scientist Klaus Schmidt during World War II, during which he attempted to experiment on a young Erik Lehnsherr to test his mutant abilities. Sometime after the war, Shaw went on to acquire a helmet from the Soviet Union capable of blocking telepaths' powers and became the leader of the Hellfire Club in the hopes of exploiting the Cuban Missile Crisis to incite World War III in a plot to accelerate the emergence of mutants. Ultimately, he is foiled by Moira MacTaggert's Division X and killed by Lehnsherr, who takes the helmet for himself and unites the Hellfire Club's remnants under his leadership.

=== Video games ===
- Sebastian Shaw appears as the final boss of X-Men.
- Sebastian Shaw appears in X-Men Legends II: Rise of Apocalypse, voiced by Alan Shearman.
- Sebastian Shaw appears as a boss in Marvel: Avengers Alliance.
- Sebastian Shaw appears in Marvel Snap.

=== Miscellaneous ===
Sebastian Shaw appears in The Legacy Quest novel trilogy, written by Steve Lyons.
