= Diamond formation =

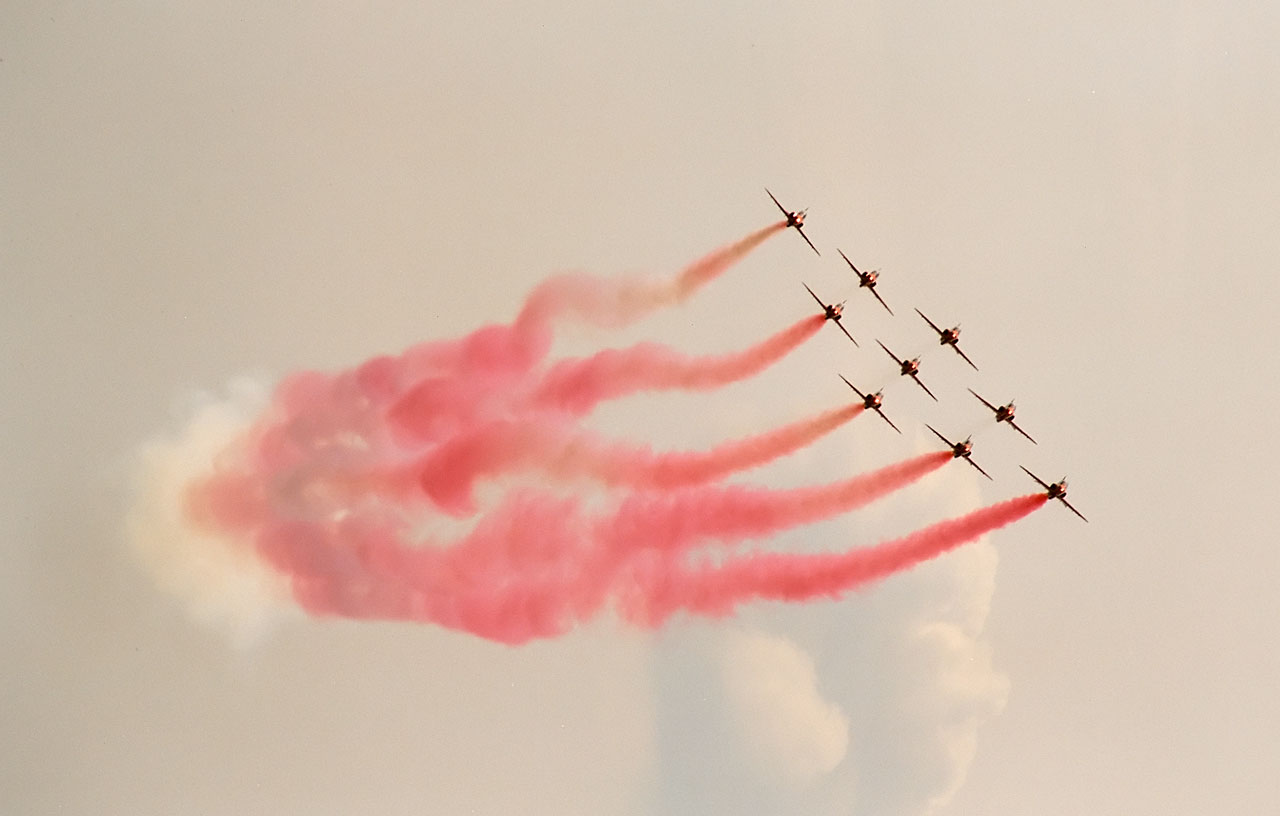
The Red Arrows in diamond formation at Radom AirShow, 2005

A diamond formation is a formation of four or more aircraft, soldiers on horseback, players in a team sport, etc., wherein the elements of the group adopt a diamond, or kite, shape.

== Aircraft ==
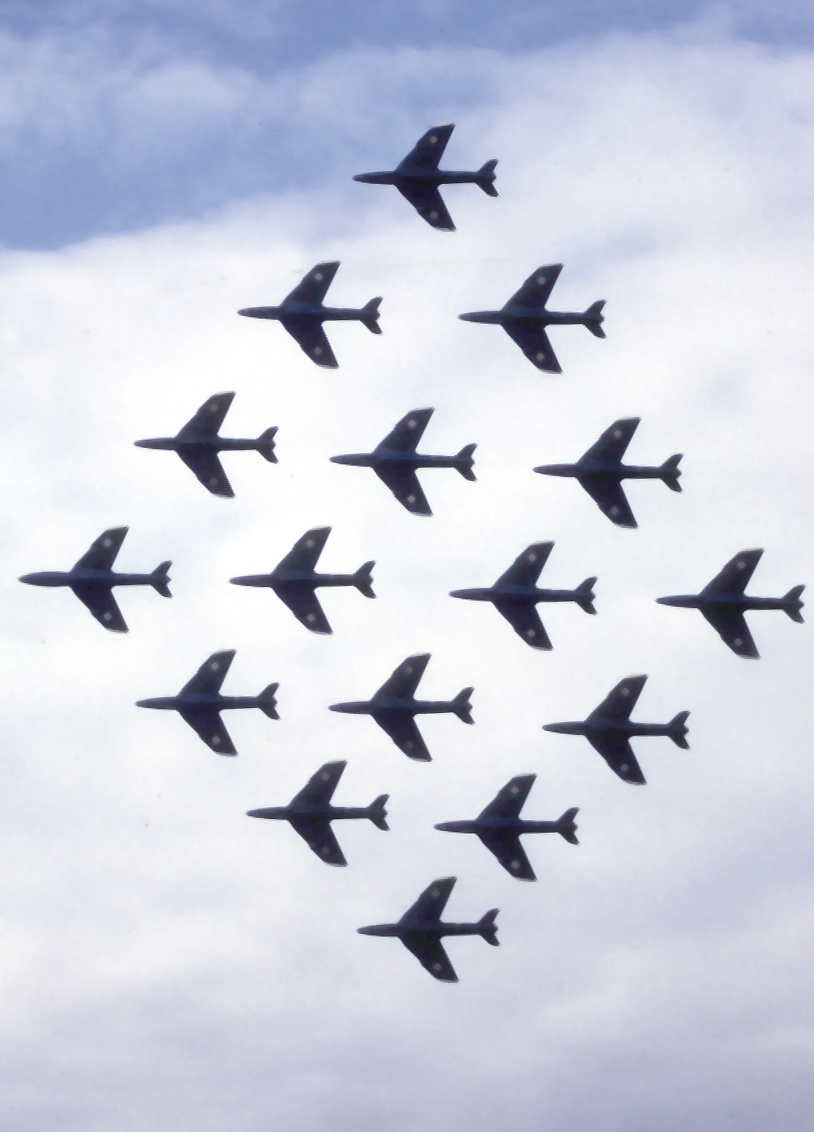
The Black Arrows in diamond formation at the Farnborough Air Show.

As few as four aircraft can establish the formation and conventionally the largest number is sixteen, in "tight formation": 1, 2, 3, 4, 3, 2, 1. Rarely attempted on jet aircraft, this feat was first achieved by the Pakistan Air Force flying U.S.-made F-86 Sabres in February 1958. It is considered a difficult formation as the aircraft have to fly very close to one another to create the desired effect. The larger the number of aircraft involved, the higher the risk, as compared to other formations.

== Military ==
Diamond formations have been used in warfare, particularly by cavalry, throughout known history. Thessalian cavalry was especially famous for the formation since it could change direction quickly.

== Sport ==
=== Football ===
A formation in association football where the four midfield players are positioned in the shape of a diamond.

=== Ice Hockey ===
A defensive formation used during a penalty kill.

== See also ==
- Military organization
