= Jean Grey (X-Men film series) =

Character in the X-Men film series

- X-Men and Marvel Cinematic Universe character
- Famke Janssen as Dr. Jean Elaine Grey / Phoenix in X-Men: The Last Stand
- First appearance: X-Men (2000)
- Last appearance: Dark Phoenix (2019)
- Based on: Jean Grey by: Stan Lee; Jack Kirby
- Adapted by: Bryan Singer; Tom DeSanto
- Portrayed by: Famke Janssen (2000–2014); Haley Ramm (child, 2006); Sophie Turner (2016–2019); Summer Fontana (child, 2019)

In-universe information
- Full name: Dr. Jean Elaine Grey
- Alias: Phoenix
- Species: Mutant
- Occupation: Scientist / physician (original timeline)
- Affiliation: X-Men
- Family: John Grey (father; deceased); Elaine Grey (mother; deceased)
- Significant others: Scott Summers; Logan
- Nationality: American
- Powers and abilities: Telepathy; Telekinesis; Matter transmutation; Precognitive dreams

Jean Grey is a character featured in the X-Men film series produced by 20th Century Fox. Based on the Marvel Comics character of the same name, she appears in seven films in the franchise, starting with X-Men (2000) and ending with Dark Phoenix (2019). Famke Janssen portrayed the character in X-Men, X2 (2003), X-Men: The Last Stand (2006), The Wolverine (2013), and X-Men: Days of Future Past (2014), while Sophie Turner portrayed a younger version of the character in X-Men: Apocalypse (2016) and Dark Phoenix.

Following Marvel parent company Disney's acquisition of 21st Century Fox in 2019, the X-Men film rights reverted to Marvel Studios, effectively ending the X-Men film series. When Marvel began the process of rebooting the franchise in the Marvel Cinematic Universe, Sadie Sink was cast as a new version of Jean Grey, debuting in the film Spider-Man: Brand New Day (2026).

== Fictional character biography ==
=== Early life ===
Jean Grey was born in 1967. X-Men: The Last Stand and Dark Phoenix each have a flashback sequence for Jean; because of the events of X-Men: Days of Future Past, these two flashbacks take place in two different versions of the same reality, Earth-10005. (Note: The 2024 Marvel Cinematic Universe film Deadpool & Wolverine gives the name "Earth-10005" to the universe of Fox's X-Men films.) The following biography is separated by the two timelines and lives of her.

=== Original Earth-10005 variant ===
==== Joining the Xavier's school ====
In 1986, Jean is visited by Charles Xavier / Professor X (Patrick Stewart) and Erik Lehnsherr / Magneto (Ian McKellen) after her parents had been concerned about what they believed to be a type of "illness" in their daughter. The girl is shown levitating multiple cars and other objects with her telekinetic powers and the two elder mutants, still friends at the time, invite Jean to the Xavier School for Gifted Youngsters. The professor later explains that while she was young, he put psychic dampers on her mind to help control a supposed "dark side" within her subconscious, preventing her powers from spiraling out of control and hurting others and herself.

==== X-Men member ====
In the 2000's, Jean (Famke Janssen) serves as a member of the X-Men, who has a complicated relationship with Logan / Wolverine (Hugh Jackman), despite her love for her fiancé Scott Summers / Cyclops (James Marsden). Following the events at Liberty Island, Jean starts to become unstable with her powers. Along with the X-Men, she learns from Kurt Wagner / Nightcrawler (Alan Cumming) and Magneto, a conspiracy by William Stryker (Brian Cox) to put an end to mutantkind. The team, Magneto, and Raven Darkhölme / Mystique (Rebecca Romijn) eventually stops it, while Jean sacrifices herself to save them at Alkali Lake.

==== Return, death and legacy ====
In 2006, Scott assists to Jean's return, revealing she survived the incident prior. However, she is possessed by the Phoenix Force, who make her kill him. Learning that, Xavier and Lehnsherr goes to her childhood home to convince her to join their respective sides. Ultimately, the Phoenix kills Xavier and team-up with Erik to face a cure against mutants, before being killed by Logan at Alcatraz Island. Additionally, she makes minor appearances in The Wolverine, in which his guilt over killing her haunts the titular character. Unknown to her at the time, the world slowly turns into dystopian future ruled by Sentinels in 2023, which led to Logan rewriting the timeline using time travel.

=== Revised Earth-10005 variant ===
==== Car crash ====
In 1975, 8-year-old Jean is in a car with her parents, causing a car crash with her out-of-control mental powers, killing her mother and leaving her father afraid of his own daughter and refusing to see her later on; Jean is led to believe that her father also died in the crash. She is approached by Charles Xavier (James McAvoy), who tries to help the troubled girl, inviting her to enroll in his school.

==== Debut as a superheroine ====
In 1983, Jean (Sophie Turner) is a student in Xavier's school and befriends Scott Summers (Tye Sheridan) upon his arrival. After spending time with him, Nightcrawler (Kodi Smit-McPhee) and Jubilee (Lana Condor), they discovers a destroyed mansion due to the emergence of En Sabah Nur, who kidnapped Xavier. Jean then assists to the capture of Mystique (Jennifer Lawrence), Peter Maximoff, Hank McCoy / Beast, and Moira MacTaggert (Rose Byrne), at Alkali Lake under William Stryker (Josh Helman)'s facility. She saves the captured people, with the help of her friends and Stryker's experiment Weapon X, whom Jean restores parts of his memory. In Cairo, she defeats En Sabah Nur using her Phoenix-like powers and rebuilds the mansion with Magneto (Michael Fassbender), while joining the new iteration of X-Men, led by Mystique, Beast and Xavier.

==== Conflict with the Phoenix Force ====
In 1992, Jean's powers become highly developed after surviving a solar flare-like energy during a space mission. Xavier also explains that he erased the car crash from her memory to keep her safe, preventing her powers from spiraling out of control and hurting others and herself. However, fragments of her memory are deblocked, leading her to reconnect with her living father. However, he rejects Jean, saying his wife died in that crash because of her. The X-Men arrives to calm her, but they fight and Mystique is killed by Jean in the process. She flew to Genosha, seeking Magneto's help but he also rejects her after Jean used her abilities in a violent way. She is found by Vuk (Jessica Chastain), leader of the D'Bari, who reveals that energy came from her planet and can help Jean using it. Jean's activities lead the mutants to come in conflict between them, before Xavier eventually apologies to Jean and bring her to normal. Jean then sacrifices herself by using the Phoenix Force's power to defeat the D'Bari, after discovering their true intentions.

==== Modern day ====
Sometime later, the Phoenix Force is seen soaring in the distant sky, foreshadowing her return. By 2023, this return is confirmed as Logan (with the consciousness of the previous timeline) is happy to see Jean alive, as well as Scott.

== Background and creation ==
=== Development ===
The casting call for the first X-Men film specifies Jean Grey's character as a "beautiful and intelligent scientist. Also an X-Man. She has telepathic and telekinetic powers. Engaged to Cyclops and yearned for by Wolverine. Late 20s". Reports from pre-production in 1999 indicated that Jean being written to be a scientist - which she is not in the comics - was due to Beast, the team's resident scientist, originally being part of the script but dropped due to budget concerns. Since director Bryan Singer had gone with a younger, teenage portrayal of Rogue (Anna Paquin), he felt that he wanted a more mature Jean in contrast.

X-Men: The Last Stand was originally meant to be a pure adaption of The Dark Phoenix Saga storyline from the comics, but Tom Rothman considered Simon Kinberg's first outline to be "too dark, too weird, and, potentially, too expensive", and hired X2 screenwriter Zak Penn to do a rewrite; Rothman was insistent upon forcing a secondary plot, that of a cure for mutants, into the film. 20th Century Fox, which owned the film rights to the X-Men franchise, was also wary of going for a film with a female lead, as its own film Elektra (2005), as well as the Warner Bros. Pictures' film Catwoman (2004), were both critical failures while Catwoman was also a box-office bomb. Rothman feared that the nature of the Phoenix Force, being akin to a giant cosmic bird, would not appeal to the masses in a cinematic setting and decided to cut that portrayal of Jean's powers. He also noted that Jean Grey would have committed suicide by the end, which was redundant with the ending of X2. The "Dark Phoenix" storyline was thus relegated to a secondary substory in The Last Stand. Simon Kinberg was disappointed by this outcome, calling the Dark Phoenix Saga "the ultimate X-Men story" and compared reducing it to a secondary subplot to sidelining the Book of Genesis chapter from the Bible.

At one point, Matthew Vaughn (the original director of The Last Stand before Brett Ratner took over) wanted Wolverine to carry Leech with him to Jean to depower her; Penn felt that this was a cop-out and Jean had to pay for her crimes, and depowering her would also not fix her broken state of mind.

The 2019 Dark Phoenix film was originally meant to be a two-part storyline, one film named only Phoenix and then Dark Phoenix as its sequel. However, the producers were unhappy with the outcome of X-Men: Apocalypse and cancelled the second sequel, forcing Simon Kinberg to compress his storyline into one film. His original ending had Jean dying at the end, but this ending was poorly received with test audiences for the film and was changed to a more hopeful outcome.

=== Casting ===
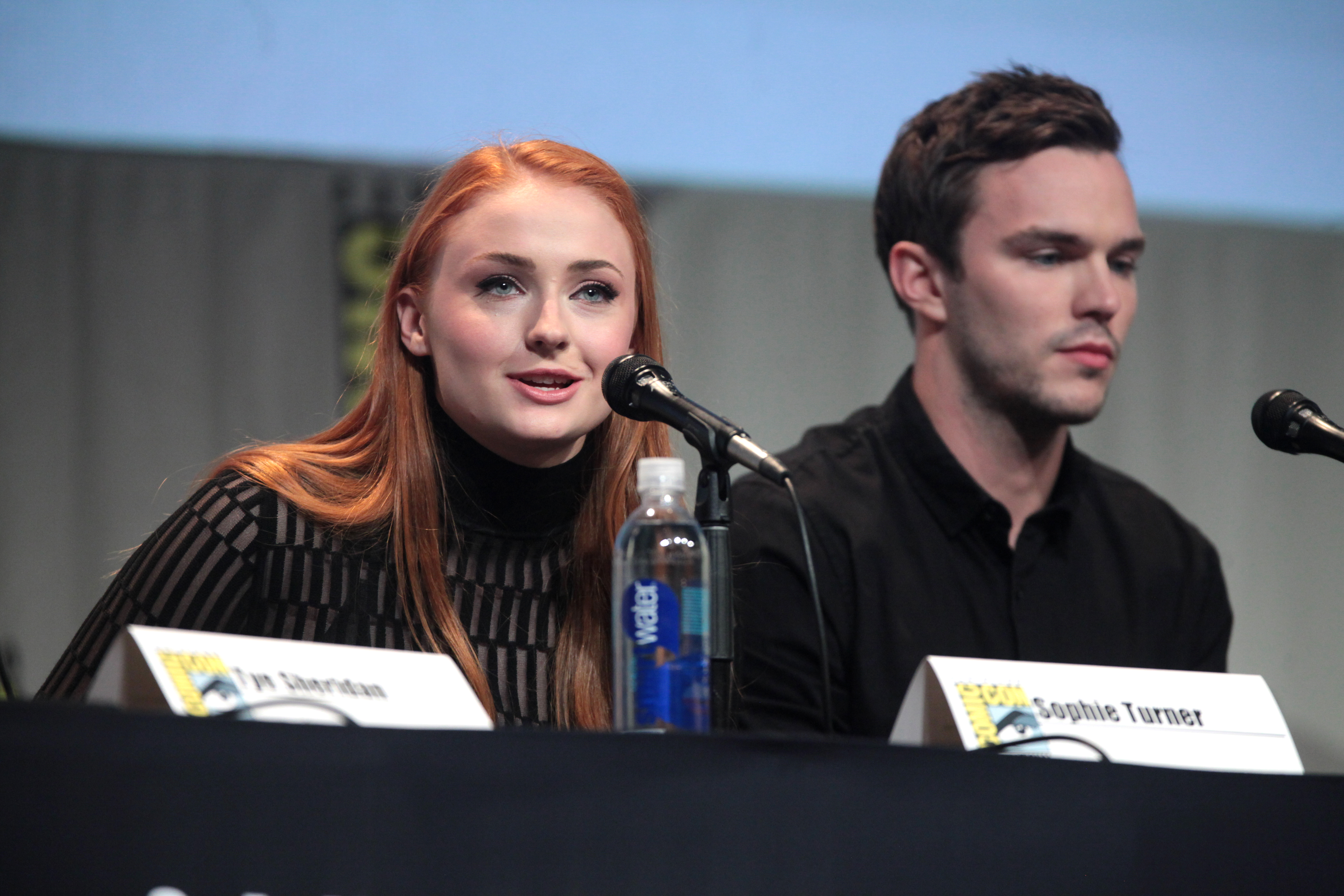
Sophie Turner and Nicholas Hoult at a Comic-Con panel for X-Men: Apocalypse.

In 1998, it was rumoured that Julianne Moore was in the talks for the X-Men film at the time, presumably for the role of Jean Grey. Helen Hunt was offered the role, but turned it down, as did Charlize Theron. Peta Wilson auditioned for the role. Ashley Judd, Alicia Witt, Selma Blair, Robin Wright-Penn, Minnie Driver, and Maria Bello were also all rumoured to have been auditioning for the role at the time. Lucy Lawless was invited to audition, possibly for the role of Jean, but choose to abstain due to her real-life pregnancy and her otherwise busy schedule with Xena: Warrior Princess. In early August 1999, it was reported by Daily Variety that Dutch model turned actress Famke Janssen had been cast as Jean Grey.

For X-Men: Apocalypse (2016), Hailee Steinfeld, Elle Fanning, Chloë Grace Moretz, and Saoirse Ronan had been among those who auditioned for the role of the younger Jean. Grace Fulton, who would go to play Mary Bromfield in the DC Extended Universe Shazam films, also auditioned to play Jean. Sophie Turner, after being cast as younger Jean, contacted Famke Janssen about advice on playing the role, but was told that there was nothing that Janssen could teach that her she did not already know, as well as being wished good luck with the role. To prepare for the role, Turner studied how schizophrenia and dissociative identity disorder works in real life.

=== Characterization and special effects ===
In X-Men: The Last Stand, Jean's appearance when the Phoenix takes control was created by John Bruno working with Moving Picture Company. MPC used particle systems to create the effect of Jean's hair seemingly moving when the Phoenix effect takes over. MPC made hundreds of skin and eye treatments and used a 3D model of Famke Janssen's face when compositing them into Jean's digital makeup. According to Nicolas Aithadi (MPC),

The idea was that when the Dark Phoenix is taking over, Jean's skin darkens, veining appears on her face, and her eyes go black. We went through hundreds of iterations with different degrees of darkness, with more or fewer visible veins. At the end, we went for a 'less is more' look and made the effect more subtle - but still enough to give Jean a scary look.

== Reception ==
Joe Garza of SlashFilm ranked Jean Grey from the X-Men film series 1st in their "Most Powerful X-Men Characters" list. Alexandra Moroca of CBR.com ranked Jean Grey 1st in their "10 Strongest X-Men In The Fox Movies" list. The A.V. Club ranked Janssen's portrayal of Jean Grey 60th in their "100 best Marvel characters" list.

Famke Janssen received praise from multiple critics for her portrayal of Jean Grey. Scoot Allan of CBR.com ranked Janssen's performance 4th in their "10 Best Performances In The X-Men Movies" list, writing, "Janssen brought the character's love for Scott Summers and her interest in Wolverine to the big screen. She also perfectly portrayed Jean's struggle with her powers that ultimately led to her loss of control in X-Men: The Last Stand. Janssen's portrayal of Jean Grey and her final moments impressed fans." Christian Bone of Starburst ranked Janssen's performance 8th in their "10 Greatest Performances in the X-Men Movies" list, stating, "Though most famous to film fans at the time as the OTT Xenia Onatopp in GoldenEye, Famke Janssen proved to be the best choice to bring Jean Grey to life in the original X-Men trilogy. Her Jean is a gentle, caring woman who nonetheless has an apocalyptic power within her that she can't comprehend." K.J. Stewart of WhatCulture ranked Janssen's performance 25th in their "50 Greatest Performances In Marvel Movies" list, saying, "Janssen has had to portray both the good Jean Grey and the malevolent Phoenix and each role has been performed comfortable. She has conveyed the wise and moral Jean just as well as the evil Phoenix entity." The A.V. Club stated, "Janssen is the emotional anchor of those early X-Men movies, setting a high standard for psychological honesty as a method to cut through some overwhelming X-Men lore that requires a Cerebro to decode. Watching Janssen's big Moses moment during X2's climax, it's clear that she's a pioneer in these massive CGI set-pieces."

Hugh Armitage and Simon Reynolds of Digital Spy called Sophie Turner's portrayal of Jean Grey "hugely likable" across X-Men: Apocalypse. Robin Reynolds of MovieWeb ranked Turner's portrayal as Jean Grey in X-Men: Apocalypse and Dark Phoenix 2nd in their "Sophie Turner's 5 Best Performances" list, writing, "The best part about having Turner play this character is getting to see how Jean transforms over the course of the films. Her acting is top-notch, and she brings so much depth to the character's struggles that anyone can relate."

=== Accolades ===
Year	Award	Category	Nominated work	Nominee(s)	Result	Ref.
2000	Blockbuster Entertainment Awards	Favorite Supporting Actress – Science Fiction	X-Men	Famke Janssen	Nominated	
2006	Teen Choice Awards	Teen Choice Award for Choice Liplock (Shared with Hugh Jackman)	X-Men: The Last Stand	Famke Janssen	Nominated	
2007	Saturn Awards	Best Supporting Actress	X-Men: The Last Stand	Famke Janssen	Won	
2017	Kids Choice Awards	Favorite Squad	X-Men: Apocalypse	James McAvoy, Michael Fassbender, Jennifer Lawrence, Nicholas Hoult, Evan Peters, Tye Sheridan, Ben Hardy, Kodi Smit-McPhee, Sophie Turner, Alexandra Shipp, Olivia Munn	Nominated	
2019	Teen Choice Awards	Choice Sci-Fi/Fantasy Movie Actress	Dark Phoenix	Sophie Turner	Nominated	

=== Merchandising ===
The Jean Grey from the first 2000 film was released as an action figure by Toy Biz in 2000. The figure has been criticized as "a static, unflattering, and oddly posed representation of Famke Janssen." The 2007 "Dark Phoenix" version of Jean Grey from X-Men: The Last Stand has been released as an action figure in Marvel Legends series.
