= Peter Maximoff =

X-Men film series character

- X-Men film series character
- Evan Peters as Peter Maximoff in the film X-Men: Apocalypse (2016).
- First appearance: X-Men: Days of Future Past (2014)
- Last appearance: Dark Phoenix (2019)
- Based on: Quicksilver by: Stan Lee; Jack Kirby
- Adapted by: Simon Kinberg; Jane Goldman; Matthew Vaughn
- Portrayed by: Evan Peters

In-universe information
- Affiliation: X-Men
- Family: Erik Lehnsherr (father); Wanda Maximoff (twin sister)

Peter Maximoff is a fictional character appearing in 20th Century Fox's X-Men film series, portrayed by Evan Peters and based on the Marvel Comics character Quicksilver, a mutant with the ability to move at superhuman speed. The character appeared in the films X-Men: Days of Future Past (2014), X-Men: Apocalypse (2016), and Dark Phoenix (2019), and had a cameo appearance in Deadpool 2 (2018).

== Appearances ==
Quicksilver first appears as a comic book character in X-Men #4 (March 1964) and was created by writer Stan Lee and artist/co-writer Jack Kirby. The character initially appears as an antagonist to the X-Men, although before long he becomes a member of the Avengers and appears as a regular character in that title beginning with Avengers #16 in May 1965. He has made numerous other appearances in that title, and other related titles, sometimes as a member of the team, sometimes as an ally, and sometimes as an antagonist. In the early 1990s, an animated X-Men TV series for Fox Kids was successful enough to impress 20th Century Fox, leading producer Lauren Shuler Donner to purchase the film rights for the comic book characters, including Quicksilver, in 1994.

In May 2013, director Bryan Singer announced that Evan Peters had been cast as Quicksilver in the X-Men films. Peters played the character in the 2014 film X-Men: Days of Future Past, and its 2016 sequel, X-Men: Apocalypse. In 2019, he reprised the role of Quicksilver in the sequel film Dark Phoenix. Following The Walt Disney Company's purchase of 21st Century Fox, all X-Men-related characters were transferred back to Marvel Studios.

In X-Men: Days of Future Past, Maximoff is introduced as a mutant who can move, speak and think at supersonic speeds. Peters described Quicksilver as "very fast, he talks quick, he moves quick. Everything else is very slow compared to him, it's like he's always at the ATM waiting for the bastard in front of him to finish". Costume designer Louise Mingenbach, who drew heavily from 1970s styles for most of the clothing seen in the 1973 scenes, had Peters wear 1981-inspired clothing; this was Mingenbach's way of showing Quicksilver's irreverence for the exact time and place.

In X-Men: Apocalypse, the character takes on a much larger narrative role. Maximoff is revealed to be the son of Erik Lehnsherr / Magneto, who is unaware of this son. Peters stated of the film,

"I have learned that he's my father at this point ... It's like an adoptive child or any kind of child who has a strange father trying to ... He knows who he is now so he is trying to find him. He's been searching for him. It's been 10 years and he hasn't found him and then something happens".

Peters also makes a brief cameo appearance as Maximoff in the live-action film Deadpool 2 (2018), along with other team members from Apocalypse.

In Dark Phoenix, Peters described the character as more mature and subdued in the film, being focused on using his abilities for good as a member of the X-Men.

In a January 2026 interview, Peters expressed interest in returning to the role in a more grounded fashion in the multiverse storyline of Avengers: Doomsday.

== Fictional character biography ==
=== Early life ===
Maximoff and his two sisters were raised by his mother, with Maximoff never having met his father. As a teenager, he uses his super speed to steal things.

=== Meeting the X-Men ===
In 1973, he is visited at his mother's home by a young Charles Xavier and Hank McCoy, along with a time-travelling Wolverine, who knows Maximoff from another point in time. They convince Maximoff to help them break Erik Lehnsherr out of his prison beneath the Pentagon. Maximoff does so by vibrating the glass roof of Lehnsherr's cell fast enough to shatter it, and when security guards confront them in a kitchen, Maximoff uses his super speed to disarm and disorient them before Lehnsherr can use his powers to harm the guards. Maximoff then parts with the other four before they board a plane for Paris.

=== Fighting Apocalypse ===
In 1983, Maximoff sees news reports of Lehnsherr, now wanted as an international criminal, surfacing in Germany. Maximoff goes to Xavier's school, arriving just after the powerful mutant En Sabah Nur and his Four Horsemen kidnap Xavier, and after Alex Summers's attempt to stop them triggers an explosion that could destroy the mansion. Sensing the danger, Maximoff uses his super-speed to evacuate the building but fails to save Alex, who disappears in the explosion. During a conversation with Mystique, Maximoff reveals that he has learned that Lehnsherr is his father, and had left his mother before Maximoff was born. In the climactic battle, Maximoff fights and briefly appears to have the upper hand against En Sabah Nur, until the villain is able to trap one of Maximoff's legs in the sand and break the other. En Sabah Nur summons Psylocke to kill Maximoff, but it turns out to be Mystique in disguise, who attacks En Sabah Nur, prompting the rest of the Four Horsemen to turn against him. Later, as the X-Men watch Lehnsherr and Jean Grey rebuild the mansion, a cast-wearing Maximoff tells Ororo Munroe that he has decided not to tell Lehnsherr yet that he is his son, but that he will remain at Xavier's school. Later still, a recovered Maximoff is shown preparing to train with other X-Men to take on future threats.

=== Dark Phoenix ===
In 1992, Maximoff accompanies several other X-Men on a mission to aid a damaged space shuttle, teleporting to the out-of-control vessel with Nightcrawler and using his super speed to rescue the astronauts on board. During the mission, however, Jean Grey is struck by an energy which amplifies her psychic powers but disturbs her emotional equilibrium. Later, when the X-Men confront a confused and distraught Grey, Maximoff almost reaches her before she is able to knock him away with her powers, seriously injuring him. He recovers shortly afterwards.

== Behind the scenes ==
For X-Men: Days of Future Past, Australia-based Rising Sun Pictures created a sequence considered by many reviewers the centerpiece of the film's effects, where Quicksilver uses his super speed in the Pentagon kitchen. Depicting how, to a speedster, actions in real time come down to a virtual standstill, objects float around in slow motion. After doing a LIDAR scan of the kitchen set, the digital recreation added many computer generated props—cooking gear, cutlery, vegetables and water released by a fire sprinkler system—rendered in near microscopic detail regarding placement and lighting, particularly because the footage had to work in 3D. To simulate Quicksilver running on the walls, Evan Peters and a stunt double were filmed in both the set being suspended by a harness and on a treadmill that stood in front of a chroma key green screen. Only Peters' legs were digitally replaced. Director Bryan Singer shot all of Quicksilver's scenes in 3,600 frames per second to demonstrate his super-speed. Despite the sequence only having 29 effects shots, it required nearly seven months of work from RSP's team of 70 artists. The sequence won two 2014 Visual Effects Society Awards, for Outstanding Effects Simulations in a Photoreal/Live Action Feature Motion Picture, and for Outstanding Virtual Cinematography in a Photoreal/Live Action Feature Motion Picture.

Rising Sun Pictures also provided the effects for Quicksilver's time-stopping, quick motion effects in the mansion rescue scene in X-Men: Apocalypse, which was also nominated for a Visual Effects Society Award.

== Reception ==
Screen Rant described the character as "one of the most beloved characters from the Fox X-Men movies", whose "super-speed was represented with unique and often humorous slow-motion sequences, resulting in Quicksilver becoming a fan-favorite amongst X-Men's repertoire of mutants". For his performance in X-Men: Apocalypse, Peters was nominated in the 2016 Teen Choice Awards as a "Choice Scene Stealer." Critic Richard Roeper wrote of that film that the "signature scene" of the film is the one in which "Quicksilver (Evan Peters) uses his super-duper-duper-duper speed to save dozens of students, all to the tune of "Sweet Dreams (Are Made of This)" by the Eurythmics", describing the scene as "a beautiful, funny, exciting, altogether magical sequence — as entertaining as anything I've seen at the movies in a long time", and closing with the recommendation that "[y]ou owe it to yourself to see Quicksilver do his thing".

The X-Men film series version is one of two live-action adaptations of Quicksilver, the other appearing in the Marvel Cinematic Universe (MCU) films Captain America: The Winter Soldier (2014) and Avengers: Age of Ultron (2015), portrayed by Aaron Taylor-Johnson as Sokovian experimental subject Pietro Maximoff, who is the twin brother of Wanda Maximoff. In 2021, Peters appeared in the MCU television series WandaVision as Westview resident Ralph Bohner, who posed as Pietro (and exhibited Pietro's speedster abilities) under Agatha Harkness' control. This was a reference to Peters' role as Peter. Peters also appeared briefly as Bohner in episode six of the 2024 follow-up series, Agatha All Along.
