= X-Men (film) =

2000 film

- Theatrical release poster
- Directed by: Bryan Singer
- Screenplay by: David Hayter
- Story by: Tom DeSanto; Bryan Singer
- Based on: X-Men by: Stan Lee; Jack Kirby
- Produced by: Lauren Shuler Donner; Ralph Winter
- Starring: Patrick Stewart; Hugh Jackman; Ian McKellen; Halle Berry; Famke Janssen; James Marsden; Bruce Davison; Rebecca Romijn-Stamos; Ray Park; Anna Paquin
- Cinematography: Newton Thomas Sigel
- Edited by: Steven Rosenblum; Kevin Stitt; John Wright
- Music by: Michael Kamen
- Production companies: 20th Century Fox; Marvel Entertainment Group; The Donners' Company; Bad Hat Harry Productions
- Distributed by: 20th Century Fox
- Release dates: July 12, 2000 (Ellis Island); July 14, 2000 (United States)
- Running time: 104 minutes
- Country: United States
- Language: English
- Budget: $75 million
- Box office: $296.3 million

X-Men is a 2000 American superhero film based on the superhero team from Marvel Comics created by Stan Lee and Jack Kirby. Directed by Bryan Singer from a screenplay by David Hayter and a story by Singer and Tom DeSanto, it features an ensemble cast consisting of Patrick Stewart, Hugh Jackman, Ian McKellen, Halle Berry, Famke Janssen, James Marsden, Bruce Davison, Rebecca Romijn, Ray Park, and Anna Paquin. The film depicts a world where an unknown proportion of people are mutants, possessing superhuman powers that make them distrusted by normal humans. It focuses on the mutants Wolverine and Rogue as they are brought into a conflict between two groups with radically different approaches to bringing about the acceptance of mutant-kind: Charles Xavier's X-Men, and the Brotherhood of Mutants led by Magneto.

Development of X-Men began as far back as 1984 with Orion Pictures, with James Cameron and Kathryn Bigelow in discussions at one point. 20th Century Fox bought the film rights in 1994, and various scripts and film treatments were commissioned from Andrew Kevin Walker, John Logan, Joss Whedon, and Michael Chabon. Singer signed to direct in 1996, with further rewrites by Ed Solomon, Singer, Tom DeSanto, Christopher McQuarrie, and Hayter. X-Men marked the American debut of Jackman, a last-second choice for Wolverine, cast three weeks into filming. Filming took place from September 22, 1999, to March 3, 2000, primarily in Toronto.

X-Men premiered at Ellis Island on July 12, 2000, and was released in the United States on July 14. The film received positive reviews from critics and was a box office success, grossing $296.3 million worldwide, becoming the ninth-highest-grossing film of 2000. Its success led to a two-decade long series of films, with the first sequel, X2, released on May 2, 2003. Following the acquisition of 21st Century Fox by Disney in December 2017 –in which Marvel regained the film rights– several actors have reprised their roles in Marvel Cinematic Universe (MCU) films, including Stewart in Doctor Strange in the Multiverse of Madness (2022), Jackman in Deadpool & Wolverine (2024), and Stewart, McKellen, Marsden, and Romijn in Avengers: Doomsday (2026). An untitled X-Men film in the MCU is in development, scheduled for release in 2028.

== Plot ==
In 1944 Nazi-occupied Poland, 14-year-old Erik Lehnsherr is separated from his parents upon entering the Auschwitz concentration camp. While attempting to reach them, he causes a set of metal gates to bend toward him because of his mutant ability to generate magnetic fields. Still, he is knocked unconscious by guards.

In the 2000s, United States Senator Robert Kelly attempts to pass a "Mutant Registration Act" in Congress, which would force mutants to reveal their identities and abilities. The telepathic mutant Charles Xavier is concerned about how Lehnsherr, who now goes by the name "Magneto", will respond to the Registration Act.

In Meridian, Mississippi, 17-year-old Marie accidentally puts her boyfriend into a coma after kissing him, because of her mutant ability to absorb the life force and powers of others. Adopting the name "Rogue", she flees to Alberta, where she meets Logan, also known as "Wolverine", a mutant with superhuman healing abilities and metal claws that protrude from between his knuckles. Sabretooth, a member of Magneto's Brotherhood of Mutants, ambushes and attacks them on the road, but two members of Xavier's X-Men, Cyclops and Storm, save them. Logan and Rogue are brought to Xavier's school for mutants in New York state. Believing that Magneto is interested in capturing Logan, Xavier asks him to stay while he investigates the matter. Meanwhile, Rogue enrolls in the school and develops a crush on the cryokinetic mutant Bobby Drake.

Brotherhood members Toad and Mystique abduct Senator Kelly, bringing him to their island hideout. Magneto uses Kelly as a test subject for a machine powered by his magnetic abilities that generates a field of radiation, which induces mutations in normal humans. Taking advantage of his newfound mutation, Kelly later escapes. Rogue visits Logan during the night while he is having a nightmare. Startled, he accidentally stabs her, but she manages to absorb his healing ability and recover. Mystique, disguised as Drake, later convinces Rogue that Xavier is angry with her and that she must leave the school. Xavier uses his mutant-locating machine Cerebro to find Rogue at a train station, and the X-Men go to retrieve her. Meanwhile, Mystique enters Cerebro and sabotages it.

Having left ahead of Storm and Cyclops, Logan finds Rogue on a train and convinces her to return. Before they can go, Magneto arrives, incapacitates Logan, and subdues Rogue, revealing that he wanted her rather than Logan. Although Xavier attempts to stop Magneto by mentally controlling Sabretooth, he is forced to release his hold when Magneto threatens the police who have converged on the station. The Brotherhood escapes with Rogue.

Kelly arrives at the school, and Xavier reads his mind to learn about Magneto's machine. Realizing the strain of powering it nearly killed Magneto, the X-Men deduce that he intends to transfer his powers to Rogue and use her to power it at the cost of her life. Kelly's body, rejecting his mutation, dissolves into liquid. Xavier attempts to locate Rogue using Cerebro, but Mystique's sabotage incapacitates him and he falls into a coma.

Fellow telepath and telekinetic mutant Jean Grey uses Cerebro, learning that the Brotherhood plans to place their machine on Liberty Island and use it to mutate the world leaders meeting at a summit on nearby Ellis Island. The X-Men scale the Statue of Liberty, battling and overpowering the Brotherhood while Magneto transfers his powers to Rogue and activates the machine. As Logan confronts and distracts Magneto, Cyclops subdues him, allowing Logan to destroy the machine. Logan transfers his powers to Rogue, rejuvenating her while putting himself into a coma.

After Xavier and Logan recover from their comas, the X-Men learn that Mystique escaped and is impersonating Kelly. Xavier leads Logan to his past at an abandoned military installation in Canada before visiting Magneto, now imprisoned in a polycarbonate complex. Magneto warns him that he intends to escape one day and continue the fight; Xavier replies that he will always be there to stop him.

== Cast ==
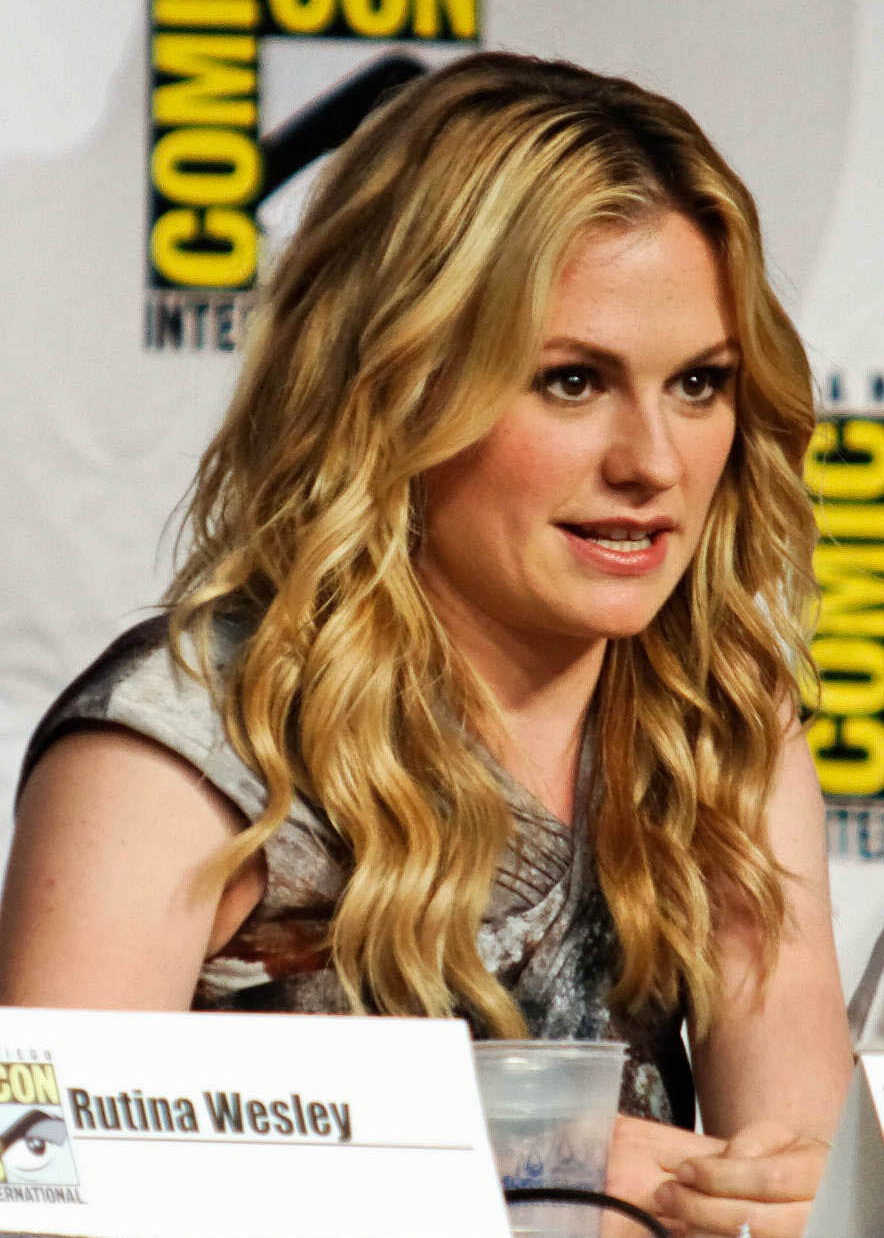
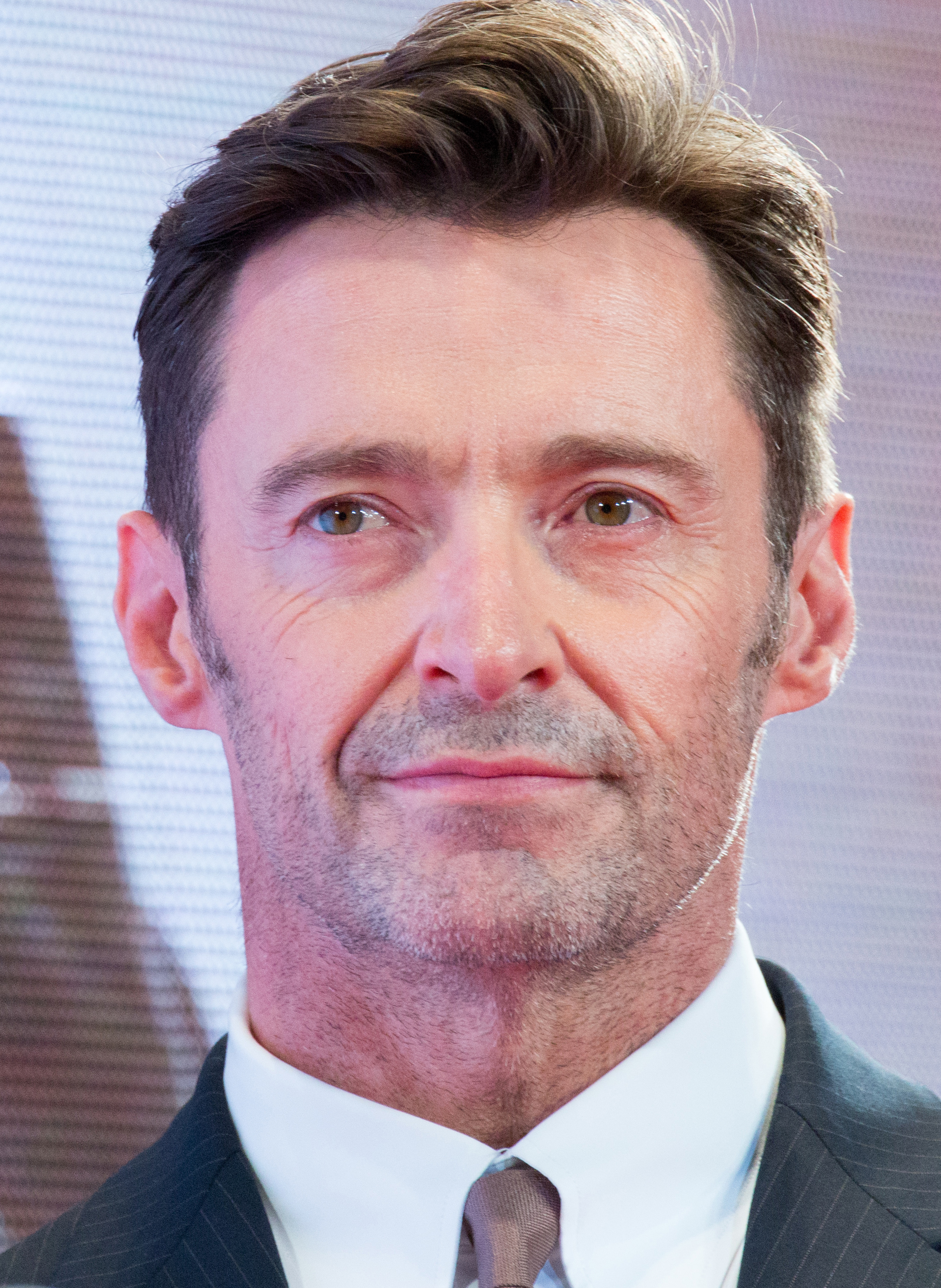
Anna Paquin (left, pictured in 2010) and Hugh Jackman (2017)
- Patrick Stewart as Professor Charles Xavier: The founder of the X-Men who hopes for peaceful coexistence between mutants and normal humans. His powers include telepathy, which is amplified by the Cerebro supercomputer.
- Hugh Jackman as Logan / Wolverine: A mutant with an adamantium-encased skeleton who cannot remember his past. His powers include animal-like senses, accelerated healing, and claws extending from his knuckles.
- Ian McKellen as Erik Lehnsherr / Magneto: A former friend of Xavier who believes that mutants and normal humans can never co-exist. His powers include the ability to generate magnetic fields. Brett Morris plays a young Magneto.
- Halle Berry as Ororo Munroe / Storm: A teacher at Xavier's school who can manipulate the weather and create lightning storms.
- Famke Janssen as Jean Grey: A doctor whose powers include telekinesis and telepathy.
- James Marsden as Scott Summers / Cyclops: A teacher at Xavier's school who can produce a beam of energy from his eyes.
- Bruce Davison as Senator Robert Kelly: An anti-mutant politician.
- Rebecca Romijn-Stamos as Mystique: A shapeshifting mutant of the Brotherhood.
- Ray Park as Toad: A Brotherhood mutant with toad-like powers.
- Anna Paquin as Marie D'Ancanto / Rogue: A mutant teenage girl who can absorb memories, life force and the powers of other mutants.
- Tyler Mane as Sabretooth: A Brotherhood mutant with animal-like senses, fangs, claws and healing abilities.
- Shawn Ashmore as Bobby Drake / Iceman: A mutant who can generate ice.

Sumela Kay appears as Kitty Pryde, Katrina Florece plays Jubilee, Donald MacKinnon portrays Piotr Rasputin / Colossus, and Alexander Burton appears as John Allerdyce / Pyro. Shawn Roberts portrays David, Rogue's first boyfriend. Cameo appearances include X-Men co-creator Stan Lee as a hot dog vendor; screenwriter David Hayter and executive producer Tom DeSanto as police officers; and George Buza, the voice of Beast in X-Men: The Animated Series (1992–1997), as a truck driver.

== Production ==
=== Development ===
Marvel Comics writers and chief editors Gerry Conway and Roy Thomas wrote an X-Men screenplay in 1984 when Orion Pictures held an option on the film rights, but development stalled when Orion began facing financial troubles. Throughout 1989 and 1990, Stan Lee and Chris Claremont were in discussions with Carolco Pictures for an X-Men film adaptation, with James Cameron as producer and Kathryn Bigelow directing.

A story treatment was written by Bigelow, with Bob Hoskins being considered for Wolverine and Angela Bassett as Storm. The deal fell apart when Stan Lee sparked Cameron's interest in a Spider-Man film, Carolco went bankrupt, and the film rights reverted to Marvel. In December 1992, Marvel discussed selling X-Men to Columbia Pictures, but the sale did not occur. Meanwhile, Avi Arad produced the animated X-Men television series for Fox Kids. 20th Century Fox was impressed by the success of the series, and producer Lauren Shuler Donner purchased the film rights for X-Men in 1994, hiring Andrew Kevin Walker to write the script.

Walker's draft depicted Professor Xavier recruiting Wolverine into the X-Men, which consisted of Cyclops, Jean Grey, Iceman, Beast, and Warren Worthington III. The Brotherhood of Mutants, which consisted of Magneto, Sabretooth, Toad, Juggernaut and the Blob, try to conquer New York City, while Henry Peter Gyrich and Bolivar Trask attack the X-Men with Sentinels. The script focused on a rivalry between Wolverine and Cyclops, as well as Cyclops's self-doubt as a field leader. Part of the backstory invented for Magneto made him the cause of the Chernobyl disaster. The script also featured the X-Copter and the Danger Room. Walker turned in his second draft in June 1994.

Laeta Kalogridis was brought in for a rewrite in 1995. One early version of her script had the idea of Magneto turning Manhattan into a "mutant homeland", while another hinged on a romance between Wolverine and Storm. Michael Chabon had pitched a six-page treatment to Fox in 1996, which focused heavily on character development between Wolverine and Jubilee. Under Chabon's plan, the villains would not have been introduced until the second film.

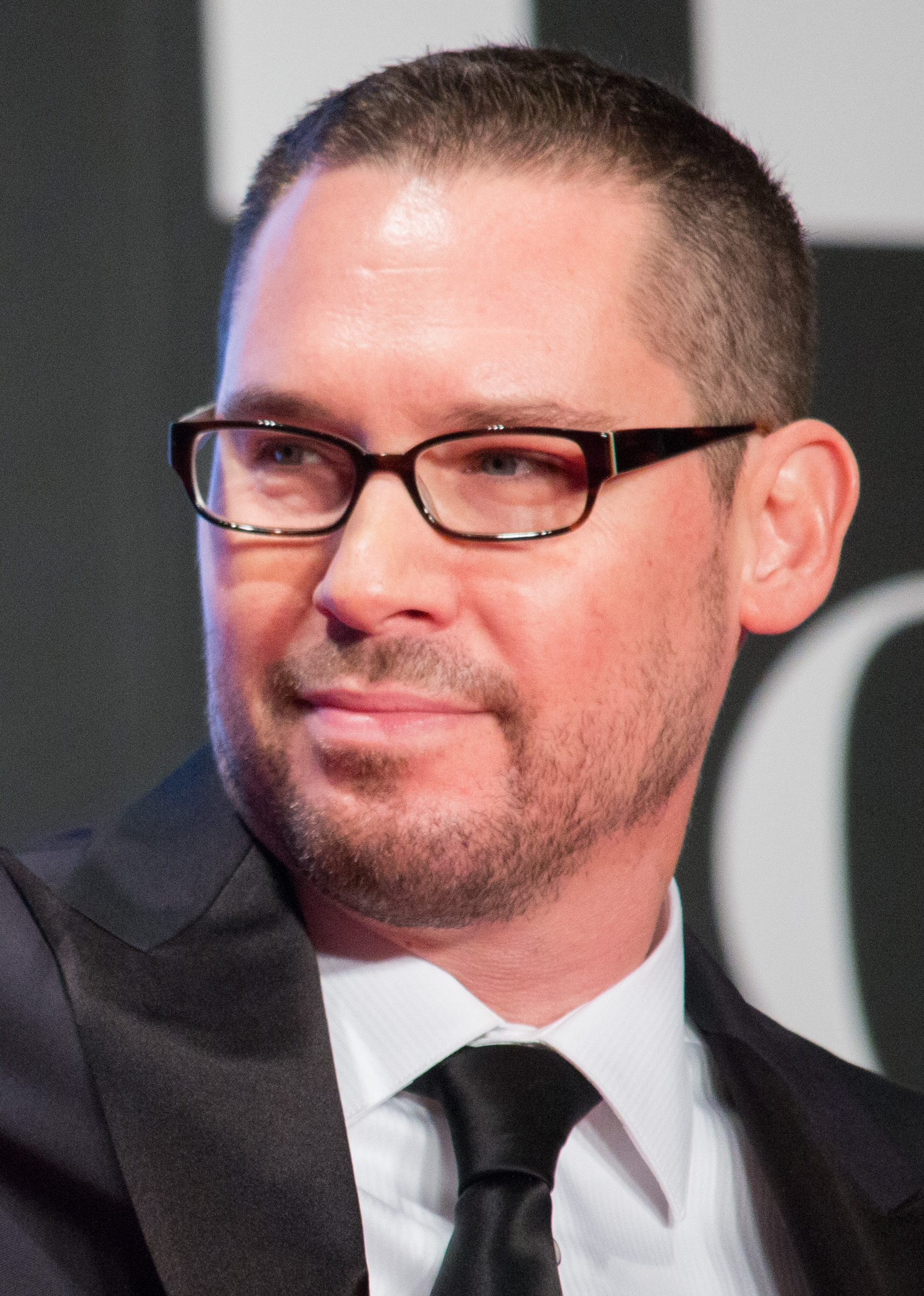
Director Bryan Singer, pictured in 2015

Seeking a director, Fox considered Brett Ratner, who would later direct X-Men: The Last Stand (2006). The studio offered the position to Robert Rodriguez, but he turned it down. After the commercial success of Mortal Kombat (1995) in the United States, Paul W. S. Anderson was offered the position, but he too declined. Following the release of The Usual Suspects (1995), Bryan Singer was looking to make a science-fiction film, and Fox offered him Alien Resurrection (1997), but producer Tom DeSanto felt Singer would be more appropriate for X-Men. Singer was hesitant to direct a comic book film, because he was not a comic book fan, but changed his mind after DeSanto presented the themes of prejudice in the comic, which resonated with Singer.

In August 1996, Ed Solomon began work on the script. By December, Singer was in the director's position, while Solomon completed a rewrite that month. Fox announced a Christmas 1998 release date. John Logan and James Schamus provided script revisions, with Schamus focused solely on fleshing out the characters. (Note: Attributed to multiple references:) In late 1997, the budget was projected at $60 million. In 1998, Chris Claremont returned to Marvel and, seeing how Fox was still struggling with the script, sent them a memo explaining the core concepts of the X-Men and what differentiated them from other superheroes.

Late that year, Singer and DeSanto sent a treatment to Fox, which they believed was "perfect" because it took seriously the themes and the comparisons between Xavier and Magneto to Martin Luther King Jr. and Malcolm X, respectively. They made Rogue an important character because Singer recognized that her mutation, which renders her unable to touch anyone, was the most symbolic of alienation. Singer merged attributes of Kitty Pryde and Jubilee into Rogue. Magneto's plot to mutate the world leaders into accepting his people was based on Constantine I's conversion to Christianity, which ended the persecution of early Christians in the Roman Empire; the analogy was emphasized in a deleted scene in which Storm teaches history. Senator Kelly's claim that he has a list of mutants living in the United States recalls Joseph McCarthy's similar claim regarding communists.

Although Batman & Robin (1997) had a disastrous reception, the release of Blade (1998) convinced some studios that a Marvel character could carry a film. Fox, which had set the budget at $75 million, rejected the treatment, estimating it would cost $5 million more. Beast, Nightcrawler, Pyro, and the Danger Room had to be deleted before the studio would greenlight X-Men. (Note: Attributed to multiple references:) Fox head Bill Mechanic argued that the cuts would enhance the story, and Singer agreed that removing the Danger Room allowed him to focus on other scenes he preferred. Elements of Beast, particularly his medical expertise, were transferred to Jean Grey.

In mid-1998, Singer and DeSanto did another rewrite with Christopher McQuarrie of The Usual Suspects. McQuarrie was initially slated to work on the script for only three weeks, but had not delivered his draft by October. Joss Whedon was brought in to rewrite the last act. He was highly critical of the script and instead performed a "major overhaul". Whedon's draft featured the Danger Room and concluded with Jean Grey dressed as the Phoenix. According to Entertainment Weekly, this screenplay was rejected because of its "quick-witted pop culture-referencing tone", and the finished film contained only two dialogue exchanges that Whedon had contributed.

Actor and producer David Hayter, who was working as Singer's assistant, was brought in for rewrites due to his extensive knowledge of the original comics. Hayter retained many core elements from the source material; the studio had wanted to make Wolverine American, but Hayter retained his Canadian background. Hayter received solo screenplay credit from the Writers Guild of America, while Singer and DeSanto were given story credit. Hayter claims that 55 percent of his script ended up in the finished film, while other insiders claim that the majority of what is onscreen was written by McQuarrie and Solomon, with only small contributions from Hayter.

=== Casting ===
Glenn Danzig was invited by Fox to audition for the role of Wolverine in 1995, but he declined due to scheduling conflicts with his band. Russell Crowe was Singer's first choice to play Wolverine, but he turned down the role in favor of Gladiator (2000), instead recommending his friend Hugh Jackman for the part. Jackman was an unknown actor at the time, while several more established actors offered their services for the role. Jackman's wife Deborra-Lee Furness told him not to take the part after reading the three pages of script he was given; Jackman was ultimately rejected for being too tall. Singer met with Viggo Mortensen, but Mortensen was apprehensive about signing on for multiple films. Vincent D'Onofrio, like Crowe and Mortensen, also turned it down. Dougray Scott was cast as Wolverine in a multi-film deal but was forced to back out due to scheduling conflicts with Mission: Impossible 2 (2000) in early October 1999 and injuries he sustained in a motorbike accident. (Note: Attributed to multiple references:) Jackman was then cast three weeks into filming, based on a successful audition.

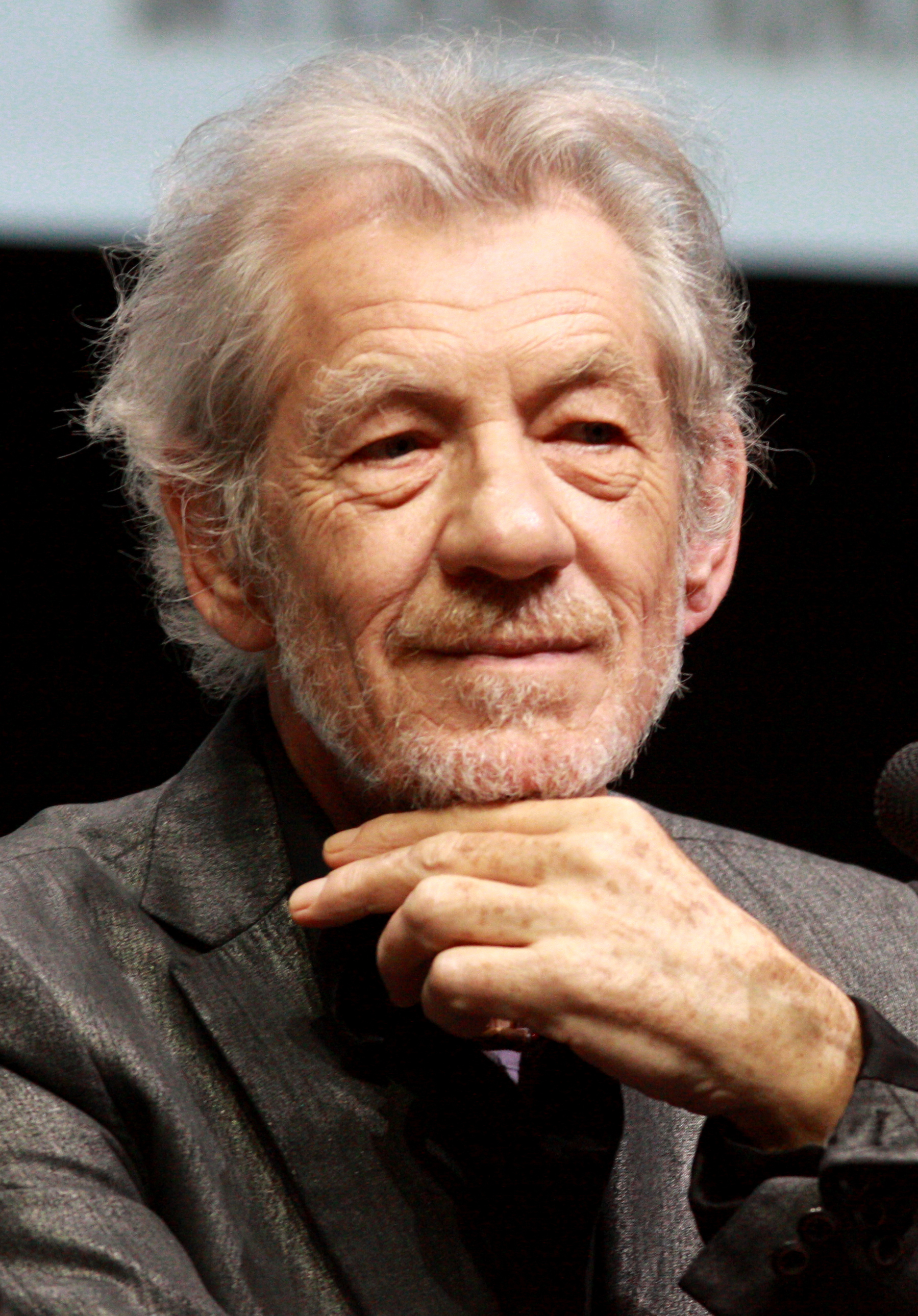
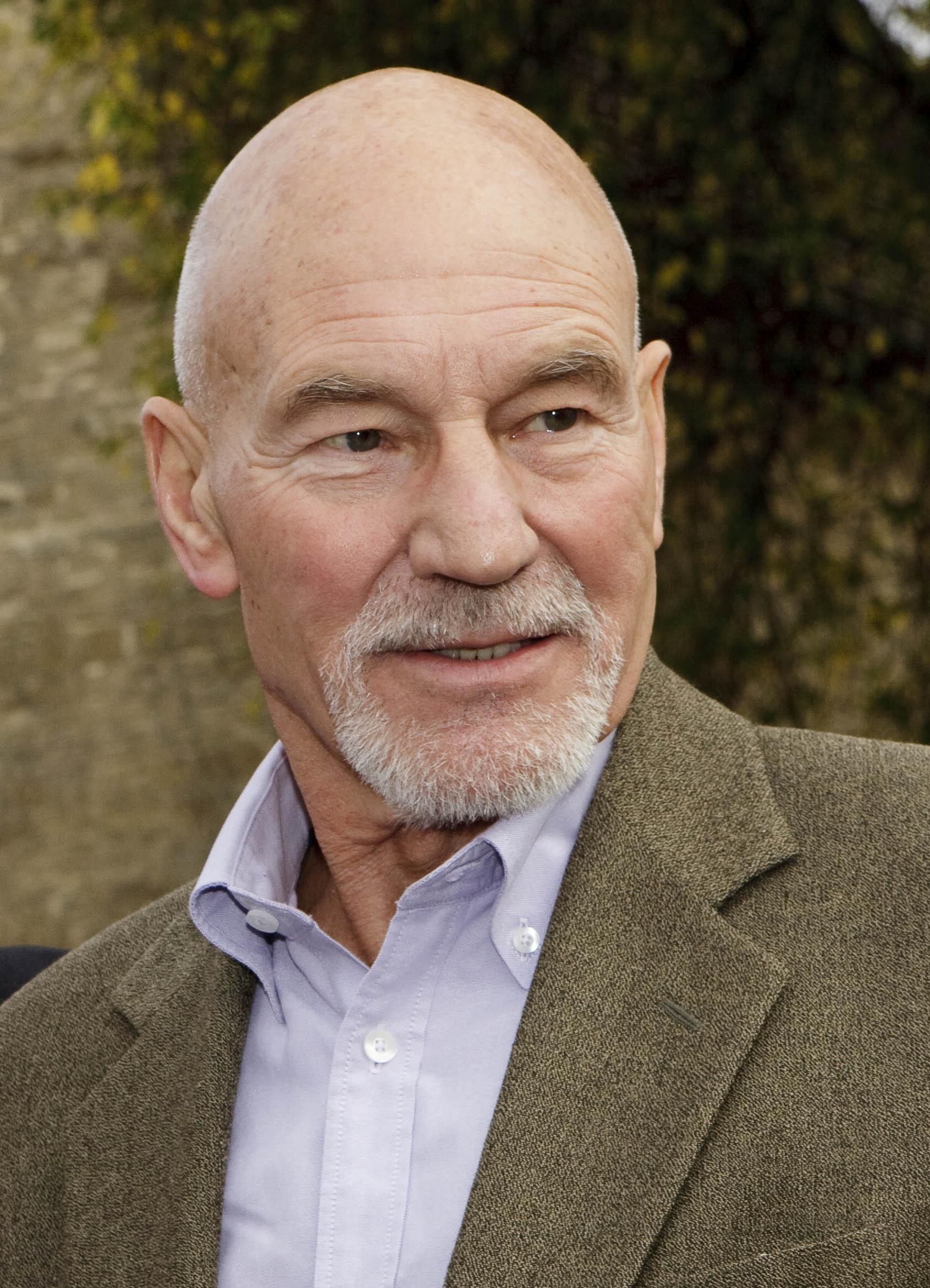
Ian McKellen (left, pictured in 2013) and Patrick Stewart (2009)

Patrick Stewart was first approached by Singer to play Xavier on the set of Conspiracy Theory (1997), which was directed by X-Men executive producer Richard Donner. Stewart initially turned down the role as he didn't know who Xavier was nor the X-Men, Singer eventually explained the clash between good and evil of the mutants; so Stewart eventually signed on. Michael Jackson actively campaigned for the role of Xavier but was never seriously considered by the studio. Chris Potter, who voiced Gambit in the animated series, auditioned for the role of Cyclops, but Jim Caviezel secured the role, although he later backed out due to scheduling conflicts with Frequency (2000). James Marsden was cast as Cyclops, and felt that Singer's concept of the character was "like a Boy Scout, very noble". After Rachael Leigh Cook turned down the role of Rogue, Anna Paquin dropped out of the starring role in Tart (2001) to play the character.

Janet Jackson was offered the role of Storm, but she turned it down due to schedule conflicts. The role of Jean Grey was offered to Charlize Theron, but she declined. In May 1999, it was announced that Ian McKellen would be cast as Magneto. Before McKellen's casting, Bill Nighy and Terence Stamp were also considered for the role. He decided not to portray a role in Mission: Impossible 2 so that he could simultaneously do both X-Men and The Lord of the Rings trilogy (2001–2003). McKellen, who had appeared in Singer's previous film Apt Pupil along with Bruce Davison, responded well to the gay allegory of the film, "the allegory of the mutants as outsiders, disenfranchised and alone and coming to all of that at puberty when their difference manifests", Singer explained, "Ian is an activist and he really responded to the potential of that allegory."

=== Filming ===
X-Men had been scheduled for release in December 2000, but Fox moved it to June 2000, then to July 14, which meant Singer had to finish the film six months ahead of schedule. (Note: Attributed to multiple references:) The original start date for principal photography was mid-1999, but it was pushed back to September 22. Filming took place in Toronto and in Burlington, Ontario. Locations included Central Commerce Collegiate secondary school, the Distillery District, and the Canadian Warplane Heritage Museum. Casa Loma, Roy Thomson Hall and Metro Hall were used for X-Mansion interiors, while Parkwood Estate was used for exteriors. Spencer Smith Park was used for Liberty Island.

During production, Singer would allegedly arrive late and experience mood swings and "explosive" tantrums. At the time, Singer claimed to be taking medication for back pain. Cast and crew members found Singer's drug use too "problematic". Kevin Feige, the film's associate producer, was flown on-set to ensure that Singer was kept in line. Singer was also accused of giving small roles to younger actors and minors in exchange for sex. A source for Pyro actor Alex Burton says Burton was told the role was created for him by Singer and Marc Collins-Rector. Burton was also flown from Los Angeles to Toronto for filming, an unusual occurrence for an actor with a minor role. Several sources close to The Hollywood Reporter claimed that story meetings were "unprofessional, even by eccentric auteur standards", with Singer allegedly bringing "young guys", who were not involved with the project, to the meetings. Singer also banned the comics on set, and Feige had to sneak them in for the actors to understand their roles. Filming wrapped on March 3, 2000. Post-production was hectic, with Shuler Donner saying that "we had to lock picture and score and edit, sometimes at the same time".

Ke Huy Quan was asked by Corey Yuen to go to Toronto, Ontario, to help choreograph fighting sequences, specifically the ending scene with Wolverine and Mystique.

=== Design and visual effects ===
The filmmakers decided not to replicate the X-Men costumes as seen in the comic book. Stan Lee and Chris Claremont supported this decision. Claremont joked, "Brightly-colored spandex skin-tight costumes in a comic look great because they're pictures. You put them on real people and it's like [disturbing]." Producer/co-writer Tom DeSanto had been supportive of using the blue and yellow color scheme of the comics, but came to conclude that they would not work onscreen. To acknowledge the fan complaints, Singer added Cyclops' line "What would you prefer, yellow spandex?"—when Wolverine complains about wearing their uniforms—during filming. Singer noted that durable black leather made more sense for the X-Men to wear as protective clothing, and Shuler Donner added that the costumes helped them "blend into the night". The black leather outfits were inspired by The Matrix (1999), as studio executives felt it would help for the film's success.

Oakley, Inc. provided the red-lensed glasses worn by Cyclops, a customized version of the company's own X-Metal Juliet. Wolverine's claws required no cast of Hugh Jackman's hands, and were built so he could easily put them on and take them off for safety reasons. Production had insisted that they be attached at all times under a full prosthetic sleeve, but designer Gordon Smith refused to do it. Production also insisted on real metal blades, which Smith also refused to do, making injection-moulded plaster blades instead. Hundreds of pairs were built for Jackman and his stunt doubles.

Rebecca Romijn wore 110 individual silicone prosthetics on her body to portray Mystique; only the edges were glued, the rest were self-sticking. The prosthetics were built flat and wrapped around her body. They were internally colored with food coloring and needed additional makeup or paint. The original agreed-to and tested design was to color her skin with cosmetic-grade food coloring as well, but at the last minute, Bryan Singer insisted on painting her skin to look opaque, as in the comic book, which added six hours to the time needed to apply Romijn's makeup, making the ordeal very difficult for her. There were also no facilities provided to exhaust paint fumes during one of Canada's colder winters. Romijn reflected, "I had almost no contact with the rest of the cast; it was like I was making a different movie from everyone else. It was hell."

In the late 1990s, computer-generated imagery was becoming more commonly used. Singer visited the sets of Star Wars: Episode I – The Phantom Menace (1999) and Titanic (1997) to understand practical and digital effects. Filming had started without a special effects company hired. Digital Domain, Cinesite, Rhythm & Hues Studios (R&H), Hammerhead Production, Matte World Digital, CORE and POP were all hired in December 1999. Visual effects supervisor Mike Fink admitted to have been dissatisfied with his work on X-Men in 2003, despite nearly being nominated for an Academy Award.

Digital Domain's technical director Sean C. Cunningham and lead compositor Claas Henke morphed Bruce Davison into a liquid figure for Kelly's mutation scene. Cunningham said, "There were many digital layers: water without refraction, water with murkiness, skin with and without highlights, skin with goo in it. When rendered together, it took 39 hours per frame." They considered showing Kelly's internal organs during the transformation, "but that seemed too gruesome", according to Cunningham.

== Music ==
Singer initially approached John Williams to compose the film score, who turned down the offer because of scheduling conflicts. Later, he roped in his usual composer, John Ottman. However, once Fox pushed X-Men from December to July, Ottman's commitment to direct Urban Legends: Final Cut made him unable to work with Singer. Instead, Michael Kamen was commissioned to compose the film's score in February 2000. This marked the first time that a different composer produced a score for any film directed by Singer instead of Ottman. Kamen had provided his scores for various Fox projects in the past, most notably the three Die Hard films. As for X-Men's score, he recorded it in Los Angeles instead of London, as the producers abandoned it due to time constraints. The soundtrack to the film was released by Decca Records on July 11, 2000. A 2-CD expanded and remastered release of the album was published by La-La Land Records on May 11, 2021.

== Release ==
=== Marketing ===
The film's first trailer was released in February 2000. Another trailer premiered on May 24, 2000 in front of Mission: Impossible 2. Fox aired a special entitled Mutant Watch to promote the film that partially includes in-universe scenes of a senate hearing featuring Senator Robert Kelly. This featurette was included as a bonus feature on some of the video releases. On June 1, 2000, Marvel published a comic book prequel to X-Men, entitled X-Men: Beginnings, revealing the backstories of Magneto, Rogue and Wolverine. There was also a comic book adaptation based on the film. A console video game, X-Men: Mutant Academy, was released on July 6, 2000, to take advantage of the film's release, featuring costumes and other materials from the film.

=== Theatrical ===
X-Men had its premiere at Ellis Island on July 12, 2000, two days before a wide opening in 3,025 theaters in North America. It would also debut in Australia that weekend to take advantage of the school holidays, while most other territories would get the film in August. Marvel Studios was depending on X-Men's success to ignite other franchise properties (Spider-Man, Fantastic Four, Hulk, and Daredevil).

=== Home media ===
X-Men was originally released on VHS and DVD on November 21, 2000, by 20th Century Fox Home Entertainment, to take advantage of Thanksgiving in the United States. In its initial home video weekend, the film earned $60 million in rentals and direct sales alongside Gladiator, making them earn more than all films in theaters outside from leader How the Grinch Stole Christmas. X-Men finished as the seventh highest-grossing home release of 2000 with $141 million, with 78% being earned through sales. A new two-disc DVD was released three years later on February 11, 2003, in anticipation to the theatrical release of sequel X2, titled X-Men 1.5. It includes the theatrical version of the film along with the option to add deleted scenes and several new additional features. This THX certified DVD release also features audio commentary of director Bryan Singer with actor and friend Brian Peck, sneak peeks for Daredevil and X2, a DTS 5.1 audio track, enhanced viewing mode and behind-the-scenes footage. The first disc has animated menus with four multi-colored orbs and the second disc has two separated sections, which are X-Men 2 and Evolution X.

X-Men was released on Blu-ray in April 2009, with bonus features reproduced from the X-Men 1.5 DVD release. Unlike the US edition, the UK release of the Blu-ray includes a picture-in-picture mode called "BonusView" and an in-feature photo gallery.

X-Men is included in the 4K Ultra HD Blu-ray set X-Men: 3-Film Collection, which was released on September 25, 2018.

== Reception ==
=== Box office ===
In North America, X-Men opened on Friday, July 14, 2000, and made $20.7 million on its opening day. This made it the third-highest Friday gross of any film, behind Toy Story 2 and The Lost World: Jurassic Park. The film earned $54.4 million in its opening weekend, averaging $18,000 per theater, and having the highest-grossing opening weekend for a superhero film (surpassing Batman Forever's $52.8 million), a non-sequel and a July release (surpassing Men in Black's $51.1 million). Moreover, it had the second-highest opening weekend of that year, after Mission: Impossible 2. At the time of its release, X-Men had the sixth-highest opening of all time, only behind the The Lost World: Jurassic Park, Star Wars: Episode I – The Phantom Menace, Mission Impossible 2, Toy Story 2 and Austin Powers: The Spy Who Shagged Me. Furthermore, it marked the first time in history that three films had consecutive opening weekends above $40 million in North America, after The Perfect Storm's $41.3 million and Scary Movie's $42.3 million. Upon its debut, the film would reach the number one spot at the box office. During its second weekend, the film was overtaken by What Lies Beneath, but made a total of $23.5 million.

X-Men grossed $157.3 million in the United States and Canada and $139 million in other territories for a worldwide total of $296.3 million, against a production budget of $75 million, becoming the eighth-highest-grossing film of 2000 domestically and ninth worldwide. The success of X-Men started a reemergence for the comic book and superhero film genre.

=== Critical response ===
Upon release, X-Men received generally positive reviews from critics. On review aggregator website Rotten Tomatoes, 82% of 176 reviews are positive, with an average rating of 7/10. The site's critical consensus reads: "Faithful to the comics and filled with action, X-Men brings a crowded slate of classic Marvel characters to the screen with a talented ensemble cast and surprisingly sharp narrative focus." Metacritic assigned the film a weighted average score of 64 out of 100 based on 33 critics, indicating "generally favorable reviews". Audiences surveyed by CinemaScore gave the film an average grade of "A−" on an A+ to F scale.

Kenneth Turan found "so much is happening you feel the immediate need of a sequel just as a reward for absorbing it all. While X-Men doesn't take your breath away wire-to-wire the way The Matrix did, it's an accomplished piece of work with considerable pulp watchability to it." ReelReviews.net's James Berardinelli, an X-Men comic book fan, believed, "the film is effectively paced with a good balance of exposition, character development, and special effects-enhanced action. Neither the plot nor the character relationships are difficult to follow, and the movie avoids the trap of spending too much time explaining things that don't need to be explained. X-Men fandom is likely to be divided over whether the picture is a success or a failure". Marc Salov of The Austin Chronicle wrote, "Of course, the wide-open ending practically shrieks "sequel," so rest assured this is only the beginning of a new super-franchise. Here's hoping Joel Schumacher doesn't get his hands on it." David Sterritt of Christian Science Monitor gave it a two-out-of-four rating and said, "Die-hard action fans may cheer, but if you're looking for the romantic verve of Superman or the dreamlike edginess of Batman, this isn't the comic-book movie for you." Desson Thomson of The Washington Post commented, "[T]he movie's enjoyable on the surface, but I suspect many people, even die-hards, will be less enthusiastic about what lies, or doesn't, underneath".

Roger Ebert of the Chicago Sun-Times said he "started out liking this movie, while waiting for something really interesting to happen. When nothing did, I still didn't dislike it; I assume the X-Men will further develop their personalities if there is a sequel, and maybe find time to get involved in a story. No doubt fans of the comics will understand subtle allusions and fine points of behavior; they should linger in the lobby after each screening to answer questions." He also gave it a "thumbs down" on Ebert & Roeper. Peter Travers of Rolling Stone noted, "Since it's Wolverine's movie, any X-Men or Women who don't hinge directly on his story get short shrift. As Storm, Halle Berry can do neat tricks with weather, but her role is gone with the wind. It sucks that Stewart and McKellen, two superb actors, are underused."

=== Accolades ===
X-Men was nominated for the Hugo Award for Best Dramatic Presentation, but lost to Crouching Tiger, Hidden Dragon. The film was also successful at the 27th Saturn Awards where it won the categories for Best Science Fiction Film, Director (Bryan Singer), Actor (Hugh Jackman), Supporting Actress (Rebecca Romijn), Writing (David Hayter), and Costumes. Nominations included Best Supporting Actor (Patrick Stewart), Performance by a Younger Actor (Anna Paquin), Special Effects, and Make-up. Singer also won the Empire Award for Best Director.

=== Legacy ===
Several journalists and film critics have credited X-Men with helping reinvent the modern superhero film by revolutionizing the genre and reviving public interest in superheroes. At the time of its release, X-Men was the most critically and commercially successful comic book adaptation to not feature Batman or Superman. Den of Geek's Don Kaye and Eric Diaz of Nerdist believe the film proved that even lesser-known comic book characters could potentially headline successful franchises. While the X-Men had already been popular among comic book readers and fans of the animated series, the film elevated its team members to mainstream popularity. Anthony Orlando of Digital Trends said the film's impact is still apparent as of 2025, having "set the stage for comic book movies to dominate theaters throughout the 21st century, launching a successful franchise with its thrilling story, compelling characters, talented cast, and thought-provoking themes". Jesse Hassenger of Paste and Stacey Henley of Syfy.com concurred that while many films helped bring superhero movies into the mainstream, the modern lineage of the genre really begins with X-Men, which established the basic formula that contemporary successes have since borrowed from. In 2020, Hayter credited the film with unleashing a "legion of superhero movies upon the world, for better and for worse".

According to Brandon Katz of The New York Observer, X-Men, along with Blade (1998), "helped to legitimize the genre as a bankable lane for Hollywood that could expand beyond the cartoonish sensibilities of older comic book films". Orlando and Salon's Matthew Rozsa credit X-Men with salvaging the superhero genre after a period of poorly-received superhero films towards the end of the 1990s that soured the genre's reputation. Rozsa said that, before The Dark Knight trilogy, the Spider-Man trilogy, and the Marvel Cinematic Universe, X-Men proved that the genre could be profitable while lending itself to "intelligent, complex stories" about social and political issues, while establishing that a larger cinematic universe was possible for superhero flicks. It arguably launched Marvel's first cinematic universe. Tom Breihan of The A.V. Club said that while several superior superhero films have been released since X-Men, "none of those later Marvel movies could exist without X-Men". Similarly, Eric Diaz of Nerdist argued that while X-Men might not be the "best" superhero film, it is inarguably "the most important comic book superhero movie ever made" because "it was certainly the comic book movie that changed how the genre was perceived from that point on, and helped launch the current superhero movie Golden Age we live in".

X-Men also inspired later comic book adaptations and superhero films to adopt a darker, more serious tone grounded in aspects of reality, both in their themes and aesthetics. Diaz noted that, unlike Superman and Batman adaptations, the film is almost completely devoid of "camp or tongue-in-cheek humor ... It treated its world with complete seriousness, and hammered home the sociopolitical underpinnings of the original comic without pulling any punches". Kaye acknowledged that while subsequent comic book films would learn several positive examples from X-Men, they also borrowed their fair share of "wrong" lessons, notably the film's aversion to the bright, colorful costumes of the comic books in favor of all-black leather. The film also influenced the careers of its principal cast, elevating several actors into box-office draws and closely associating them with their roles—most notably Stewart and McKellen. Diaz theorizes that McKellen's performance inspired other serious actors of his caliber to accept superhero roles, notably Alfred Molina in the Spider-Man trilogy and Josh Brolin in the MCU. Jackman, in particular, rose from relative obscurity to become “one of the biggest movie stars in the world”. Meanwhile, Marvel Comics themselves began taking advantage of Wolverine's marketability by featuring the superhero outside of the immediate X-Men comics, due in part to Jackman's popularity and longevity in the role. Justin Carter of Polygon observed that, after Jackman's success, both the MCU and DCEU would reuse the formula of using superhero movies to launch the careers of relatively unknown actors into superstardom, notably Chris Evans, Chris Hemsworth, and Gal Gadot. However, Carter noted that Jackman also suffered from typecasting for much of his post-X-Men career.

== Sequel ==
After the film's critical and financial success, a series of films followed, starting with X2 (2003).
