= Dark Phoenix (film) =

2019 film by Simon Kinberg

- Theatrical release poster
- Directed by: Simon Kinberg
- Written by: Simon Kinberg
- Based on: X-Men by; Stan Lee; Jack Kirby; "The Dark Phoenix Saga" by; Chris Claremont; John Byrne
- Produced by: Simon Kinberg; Hutch Parker; Lauren Shuler Donner; Todd Hallowell
- Starring: James McAvoy; Michael Fassbender; Jennifer Lawrence; Nicholas Hoult; Sophie Turner; Tye Sheridan; Alexandra Shipp; Evan Peters; Kodi Smit-McPhee; Jessica Chastain
- Cinematography: Mauro Fiore
- Edited by: Lee Smith
- Music by: Hans Zimmer
- Production companies: 20th Century Fox; Marvel Entertainment; Kinberg Genre; Hutch Parker Productions; Bad Hat Harry Productions (uncredited); The Donners' Company
- Distributed by: 20th Century Fox
- Release dates: June 4, 2019 (TCL Chinese Theatre); June 7, 2019 (United States)
- Running time: 114 minutes
- Country: United States
- Language: English
- Budget: $200 million
- Box office: $252.4 million

Dark Phoenix (marketed internationally and released on home media as X-Men: Dark Phoenix) is a 2019 American superhero film based on the Marvel Comics superhero team the X-Men. It is a sequel to X-Men: Apocalypse (2016), the twelfth installment in the X-Men film series, and the fourth and final installment of the prequel films. It marks the first main X-Men film without the involvement of Hugh Jackman as Wolverine, and the last to be produced by Bad Hat Harry Productions, though the company was uncredited due to sexual assault allegations made against Bryan Singer in 2019. Written and directed by Simon Kinberg, it stars James McAvoy, Michael Fassbender, Jennifer Lawrence, Nicholas Hoult, Sophie Turner, Tye Sheridan, Alexandra Shipp, and Jessica Chastain.

Dark Phoenix tells the origin story about how Jean Grey becomes the Phoenix. The story revolves around Jean struggling with mental illness after a cosmic force enhances her psychic powers. It follows Jean as she tries to avoid hurting the people she loves, while other parties seek to control or kill her.

After X-Men: Days of Future Past (2014) erased the events of X-Men: The Last Stand (2006) from the series' timeline, Kinberg expressed interest in a new adaptation of Chris Claremont and John Byrne's "The Dark Phoenix Saga" in a future film that would be more faithful than his previous attempt with X-Men: The Last Stand, which was met with a mixed reception, with even Kinberg and co-writer Zak Penn ultimately unimpressed with the film. The new adaptation was confirmed as a sequel to Apocalypse in 2016. Kinberg signed on as director in June 2017, with the majority of the cast returning from Apocalypse. Filming began later that month in Montreal and was completed in October 2017; the entire third act was reshot in late 2018 after test screenings yielded poor responses. The film is dedicated to the memory of X-Men co-creator Stan Lee, who died in November 2018.

Dark Phoenix was theatrically released in the United States by 20th Century Fox on June 7, 2019, to a critical and commercial failure. Deadline Hollywood estimated the film lost $133 million after marketing and distribution costs, making it one of the biggest box-office bombs of all time.

== Plot ==
In 1975, eight-year-old Jean Grey is orphaned in a car crash when her telekinetic powers manifest. Professor Charles Xavier brings her to his School for Gifted Youngsters, promising to teach her to control her mutant abilities.

In 1992, during the Space Shuttle Endeavour’s first mission, the shuttle is damaged by solar flare-like energy, and the president calls upon the X-Men to save the astronauts. Rescuing the crew, Jean is struck by the energy; her psychic powers become amplified, but harder to control as her emotional state deteriorates. Xavier reveals to the other X-Men that he suppressed Jean's memory of causing the car crash as a child to keep the psychological trauma from making her unstable, but her enhanced power is destroying the mental blocks and she is now experiencing PTSD symptoms. This all results in both her emotions and her powers going out of control.

Jean travels to her hometown after seeing visions of her father and finds him alive, having survived the car crash and forsaken her. She recovers her memory and realizes that her powers, uncontrollable at the time, caused the crash and killed her mother. The X-Men arrive, and after a skirmish in which Peter Maximoff is injured, Xavier mentally freezes everyone to allow Raven Darkhölme to persuade Jean to come home, but Jean accidentally kills Raven during a violent telekinetic episode.

Fleeing to the island of Genosha, a mutant refuge run by Erik Lehnsherr, Jean asks him for help controlling her rage, but military helicopters arrive, demanding Jean's surrender; she attacks them, and Lehnsherr angrily banishes her. She is found by Vuk (after killing Jean's father), leader of a shape-shifting alien race known as the D'Bari, who explains that the cosmic force Jean absorbed had wiped out the D'Bari planet, consuming everything in its path until it was drawn to Jean. She offers to help Jean learn to use the force safely.

Hank McCoy, blaming Xavier for Raven's death, leaves the school and allies with Lehnsherr and his faction of mutants in a plan to kill Jean in New York City. Learning of Lehnsherr's plan, Kurt Wagner teleports the X-Men to New York to save her. While the two factions battle, Lehnsherr confronts Jean and Vuk but is defeated by Jean's amplified powers. Xavier convinces Jean to read his memories, helping her former personality resurface. Remorseful, she attempts to let Vuk take the Phoenix Force from her, but Scott Summers stops her when Vuk reveals the D'Bari's intent is to use the force to conquer Earth. Government troops subdue both mutant factions while Vuk escapes.

The mutants are confined on a train, and Vuk and her D'Bari forces attack, overpowering the soldiers while the mutants are freed. Xavier and Scott convince McCoy, Lehnsherr, and their allies that Jean is not beyond help, and they unite to fend off the D'Bari attackers before Vuk arrives. Xavier confers with Jean within his mind, and she forgives him, saving the mutants from the ensuing train wreck and disintegrating the remaining D'Bari. Vuk again attempts to drain the force from Jean, who flies them into space to unleash all of her power and kill Vuk. Jean then transforms into a phoenix-shaped being of energy.

Xavier's school is renamed the "Jean Grey School for Gifted Youngsters" and Xavier retires as dean, with McCoy taking his place. While sitting at a café on Rue de la Paix, Paris, Xavier is surprised by Lehnsherr, who invites him to a game of chess and they reconcile, while a flaming phoenix appears high in the sky.

== Cast ==
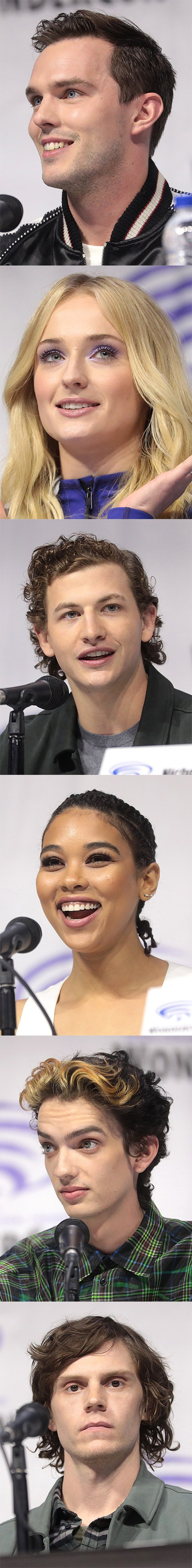
Cast members at the 2019 WonderCon. From top to bottom: Hoult, Turner, Sheridan, Shipp, Smit-McPhee, and Peters
- James McAvoy as Professor Charles Xavier:
  A mutant pacifist, he founded Xavier's School for Gifted Youngsters. Many of the characters in the film turn against Xavier as some of his decisions regarding Jean Grey's abilities are revealed. Director Simon Kinberg felt that the character always acts out of concern for the "greater good", though he may make some "misguided" choices at times. Kinberg hoped that each character would come across as having "a valid point of view" in the film.
- Michael Fassbender as Erik Lehnsherr / Magneto:
  A powerful mutant who can control magnetic fields and manipulate metal, he is Xavier's former best friend and often rival, as well as Peter's father (though he does not know this). Magneto has formed a community of mutant refugees on the island of Genosha, which Kinberg compared to Israel, in that it is a homeland where mutants can feel safe.
- Jennifer Lawrence as Raven Darkholme / Mystique:
  A shapeshifting mutant and Xavier's adopted sister. Lawrence described her role in the film as more maternal than before, as she leads the younger X-Men. The film continues growing the schism between Mystique and Xavier, with Mystique not approving of some of Xavier's methods, though Kinberg hoped that this would be more subtle in Dark Phoenix than in the previous X-Men films.
- Nicholas Hoult as Hank McCoy / Beast: A mutant with a beastly appearance and superhuman physical abilities. He is a teacher at Xavier's School and helps lead the younger X-Men. He continues to have feelings for Mystique.
- Sophie Turner as Jean Grey / Phoenix:
  An extremely powerful mutant scared of her telepathic and telekinetic powers, who is one of Xavier's most prized students. The Phoenix entity is unleashed in the film, leading her to grow more and more unstable as her two personalities fight for control. The film also explores her past. Turner studied dissociative identity disorder and schizophrenia for the role, particularly for scenes where she has to change from the vulnerable Jean to the confident Phoenix. Kinberg said Turner has the lead role in the film, a first for the actress. Summer Fontana portrays an 8-year-old Jean.
- Tye Sheridan as Scott Summers / Cyclops:
  A mutant who fires concussive optic beams. The film develops his relationship with Jean Grey, which Kinberg called "a huge part of the emotional core of the movie." This forces the character to become a leader in the film, as he is the most prominent character who holds on to hope as Jean grows more unstable.
- Alexandra Shipp as Ororo Munroe / Storm: A Kenyan mutant who can control the weather.
- Evan Peters as Peter Maximoff / Quicksilver:
  Erik's mutant son who can move at superhuman speed. Peters described the character as more mature and subdued in the film, being focused on using his abilities for good as a member of the X-Men.
- Kodi Smit-McPhee as Kurt Wagner / Nightcrawler: A German mutant who can teleport.
- Jessica Chastain as Vuk / Margaret Smith:
  The leader of a shapeshifting alien race known as the D'Bari, who seeks to capture the Phoenix so she can use it to conquer Earth. Kinberg described her as "the devil on Jean's shoulder", while Chastain called her character "clinical". Chastain also plays Margaret Smith, the woman Vuk impersonates. Chastain was unaware about her character’s name until after the film was released.

Other cast members include Scott Shepherd as John Grey, Jean's father; Ato Essandoh as Jones, Vuk's second in command; and Brian d'Arcy James as the President of the United States. Additionally, Kota Eberhardt portrays telepath Selene Gallio, while Andrew Stehlin portrays Ariki, a mutant who can utilize his hair braids as a weapon; this character was initially reported as Red Lotus. Halston Sage briefly appears as Dazzler in the character's first cinematic appearance, Hannah Emily Anderson appears as Jean's mother Elaine, and Lamar Johnson appears as Match. Veteran X-Men writer Chris Claremont makes a cameo appearance as a White House guest during the scene in which Xavier accepts his award for rescuing the crew of the space shuttle Endeavour. Daniel Cudmore, who previously portrayed Colossus in the franchise, was announced to appear but ultimately did not do so, though he was credited as a stunt performer.

== Production ==
=== Development ===
When he joined the team making the sequel X2 (2003), writer Zak Penn convinced director Bryan Singer not to adapt the Marvel Comics storyline "The Dark Phoenix Saga" for the film, believing it was "too soon to go into the Phoenix story and it was too soon to get cosmic". The character of Jean Grey / Phoenix was instead explored "subtly", with the intention of the full story being adapted in the next film instead. Singer did not return to direct the sequel X-Men: The Last Stand (2006), written by Penn and Simon Kinberg, which was directed by Brett Ratner instead. The studio chose to adapt the "Dark Phoenix Saga" as only one of the film's "parallel storylines", with an executive at 20th Century Fox suggesting that the "Gifted" storyline also be in that film. This version of the story was not well received by fans and critics. Kinberg stated that he and Penn were ultimately unhappy with how the adaptation turned out as well.

After the timeline of the X-Men franchise was retconned with X-Men: Days of Future Past (2014), it was noted that a new adaptation of the "Dark Phoenix Saga" could be made that ignores the events of The Last Stand. Kinberg and Singer both expressed interest in the prospect, and hinted that X-Men: Apocalypse (2016) would set up elements for a retelling. Apocalypse introduces Sophie Turner as a young Jean Grey and begins exploring "how powerful she is". By April 2016, the sequel to Apocalypse was being rumored to indeed be a re-adaptation of "The Dark Phoenix Saga". In May 2016, Kinberg said that the next X-Men film after Apocalypse would be set in the 1990s, advancing one decade, as had been done for each of the previous few X-Men films. He also noted that Apocalypse had introduced younger versions of several characters from the original X-Men films to give them a new origin story—including Storm, Cyclops, Nightcrawler, and Jean Grey—with the intention of then exploring them in their own line of films. He added that he also hoped to see the cast of the previous trilogy of films return, namely James McAvoy as Charles Xavier, Michael Fassbender as Erik Lehnsherr / Magneto, and Jennifer Lawrence as Raven Darkhölme / Mystique.

In July, Kinberg said he would begin writing the next mainline X-Men film "real soon". That November, Fox was said to be pressing "the reset button" on the franchise due to the financial and critical under-performance of Apocalypse, with the franchise being reconfigured and Singer not returning to direct the next film. McAvoy, Fassbender, Lawrence, and Nicholas Hoult's contracts from the previous trilogy had ended, but Kinberg was optimistically writing the new script with them in mind. It was rumored in February 2017 that the next film would be titled X-Men: Supernova, and would begin filming that June. Also in February, Turner confirmed that she would return for the film. Kinberg was believed to be interested in making his directorial debut with the film, and was described as the top contender for the job with interest from Fox. The studio was also looking to negotiate new deals with Lawrence, Fassbender, McAvoy, and Hoult to return. By the end of the month, Kinberg described reports that he might direct the film as "premature", but added that, if he were to direct, he would not be daunted by the scale of the film due to his experience writing and producing many of the other X-Men films. He also reiterated that he would adapt "The Dark Phoenix Saga" differently than they had in The Last Stand, if given another opportunity to do so.

=== Writing ===
Simon Kinberg began writing the film in late 2016. The movie would work as an origin story about how Jean Grey becomes the Phoenix and would center around her struggling with mental health issues; research was done on various trauma-related mental illnesses.

Concept art revealed that, originally, the film was to feature the return of Emma Frost and a new incarnation of the Hellfire Club. The new members were Harry Leland, Friedrich von Roehm, Fenris, Shinobi Shaw, and the Red Lotus gang (whom Andrew Stehlin was set to play). They were replaced with the Skrulls as the film's villains after the script was rewritten, and the Skrulls were replaced with the D'Bari after reshoots. However, the role the aliens play in the story was still based on the Hellfire Club, with Jessica Chastain's character being inspired by Mastermind and Emma Frost. More concept art revealed that the scene with the D’Bari watching Charles Xavier at the White House was an element from the earlier script, as the Hellfire Club can be seen watching the event on television at their lair.

=== Pre-production ===
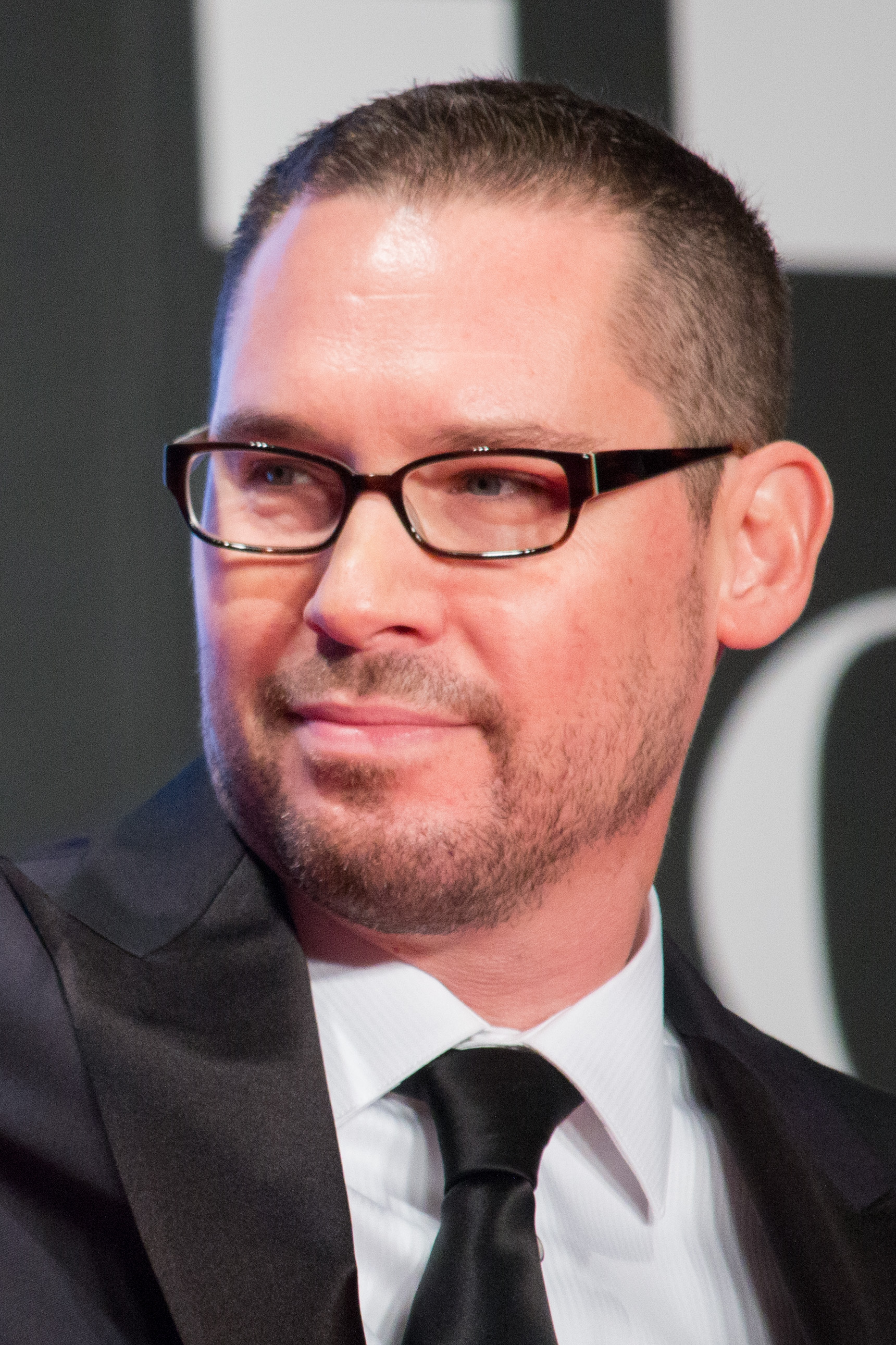
Director, producer, and screenwriter Bryan Singer was removed from the X-Men franchise following allegations of sexual abuse.

Kinberg said at the start of March 2017 that he and producer Hutch Parker had begun early prep on the film, and that Supernova was just a code name they had been using for the sequel. He said they began discussing the story for the film during post-production on Apocalypse, and that they wanted to do "something bold and radical and expand the universe in the same way that Logan (2017) feels bold and radical and certainly Deadpool (2016) does as well". In pitching the film to the studio, Kinberg used real world imagery, such as footage of disasters and lightning strikes, and focused on an organic and grounded approach as a response to criticisms of Apocalypse's heightened reality. Fox officially titled the film Dark Phoenix in April 2017 and gave it a release date of November 2, 2018. Fassbender indicated in May that he would be returning for the film, and Parker soon hinted that a younger version of the character Rogue could appear and that the film might explore the cosmic elements of the "Dark Phoenix" storyline.

Fox confirmed that Kinberg would direct the film and that McAvoy, Fassbender, Lawrence, and Hoult had all signed on to return for one more film. In addition to Turner, Apocalypse actors Alexandra Shipp, Tye Sheridan, and Kodi Smit-McPhee were also confirmed to be returning, while producers for the film were revealed to be Kinberg and Parker. At that time, Chastain was in talks to join the cast as Shi'ar Empress Lilandra Neramani, the film's villain. The film's script was said to "hew closer" to the original "Dark Phoenix Saga" by Chris Claremont and John Byrne than The Last Stand did. Despite being listed as a producer, Lauren Shuler Donner had no involvement in the film and was only given credit due to contract terms. It was later revealed that the character Dazzler would appear in the film, after being hinted at in a scene that was eventually deleted from Apocalypse. Halston Sage was cast in the role in August 2017. Singer was originally announced as being a producer on the film, but following allegations of sexual abuse against him, Kinberg stated that he was not involved in the film and his name would not be in the film's credits.

Daniel Orlandi returned as costume designer for the film after doing so on Logan. He worked with Kinberg to come up with costumes for the X-Men that were closer to the original comic designs that Kinberg had wanted to see in the films since he first joined the franchise, but had never been in a position to control before. The final costumes for the film feature the yellow-and-blue design of the original comics, but combine features of designs from many different incarnations of the group. Kinberg also looked to Logan for general design inspiration, wanting to replicate the "naturalistic" and "handmade" quality of that film for the costumes, sets, props, and title design. He felt that this would give more impact to the large-scale elements of the film, and help it be more emotional, comparing this idea to the original Star Wars films.

=== Filming ===
Principal photography began on June 28, 2017, in Montreal, Quebec, under the working title Teen Spirit. Mauro Fiore served as cinematographer. Filming primarily took place at MELS Studios. Before the end of the month, Evan Peters was set to reprise his role as "audience favorite" character Quicksilver from the previous films, and Lamar Johnson joined the cast in an undisclosed role. At the start of August, Chastain confirmed her involvement in the film; she was interested in the story, after turning down roles in other superhero films, due to its focus on female characters. She later revealed that she was not actually playing Lilandra. Kinberg said he wanted the film to be "human" and emotional like previous X-Men films, and that he was looking to ground the "Dark Phoenix Saga" story for his adaptation "so it's not too intergalactic". He later clarified that the film would still include alien characters as in the comic storyline, an element that was ignored for the Last Stand adaptation, but which he felt was integral to the story. He also said that the film would tonally be less operatic than previous X-Men films, which he hoped would make it more relatable for audiences. By September, Daniel Cudmore had stated that he would be appearing in the film, but could not confirm whether he would be reprising his role as Colossus from previous films in the franchise. Olivia Munn initially said that she would reprise her role as Psylocke, but by February 2019 she revealed that she was unable to reprise her role due to scheduling conflicts with filming The Predator (2018). Filming was completed on October 14, 2017.

=== Post-production ===
In December 2017, Kinberg revealed that the film would be in post-production for almost a year, longer than usual for the series, because he wanted to take the time to have the visual effects look right by focusing on the "nuance" of the effects, rather than the scale. He also explained that he "felt in his gut" that this was the story he needed to tell once Singer left the franchise, and that his vision for the film was "so clear in my head, emotionally and visually, that it would have killed me to hand this to somebody else to direct." The film was described as being the most sinister and somber of the franchise, with McAvoy finding it to be the most emotional of the X-Men films he had worked on. It becomes a "fight for Jean's soul" and features a twist that was intended to have significant repercussions on the entire franchise. Lawrence revealed that she had worked to convince Kinberg to direct the film, and had promised to return for it if he did so, despite her dislike of the make-up required to portray her character. It was revealed that the film would introduce a version of the island Genosha, adapted to the film as a mutant refuge led by Magneto, and that it would focus on the female characters more so than previous films in the series, particularly Jean Grey, as both the protagonist and antagonist of the story, and Chastain's character, with whom Grey has a complex relationship.

Fox delayed the film's release in March 2018, pushing it back from November 2, 2018, to February 14, 2019. This was because Fox and Kinberg wanted to schedule some routine reshoots for the film after receiving feedback from audiences during a test screening, but were not able to get all of the necessary cast members together until August or September 2018. This would not have left enough time to complete post-production work, such as visual effects, for the additional footage before the November 2018 release date. Specifically, Kinberg was looking to rework the third act of the film, and re-wrote part of the script ahead of the reshoots. With post-production already underway, the film was believed to have been under-budget, while the planned reshoots would cost less than $10 million. Additionally, Kinberg and the studio had been looking to change the film's release date for "some time" to avoid competing with the Christmas-oriented film The Nutcracker and the Four Realms (2018). The new February release date was noted as having the film opening away from other major studio films, while placing it on President's Day weekend, which had proved to be successful for Deadpool and Marvel's Black Panther (2018). Addressing the reshoots, Kinberg confirmed the scheduling delays, and described the photography as a "normal" part of the film's creation that would allow him "enough time to have it ready and looking perfect."

At the end of April, a Fox panel at the 2018 CinemaCon revealed the first logo for the film. It did not include "X-Men" in the title, but included a circle around the 'X' in Dark Phoenix which was compared to the logo of The X-Files; the film was later confirmed to be simply titled Dark Phoenix in the United States, and X-Men: Dark Phoenix for release internationally. By that August, reshoots were expected to take place in Montreal over two and a half weeks, though the Quebec Film and Television Bureau believed that these would take up to three months to complete, due to scheduling conflicts among the cast. The reshoots were set to take place at MTL Grandé studios, since MELS Studios was reserved for another production during the reshoot period, and had begun by August 31. At the end of September, after the release of the film's first trailer, Fox again delayed the film's release, setting it for June 7, 2019. This date was seen as a better time to release the film in China, where the trailer received more attention than it did in the United States, while also allowing it to take advantage of premium screens that had previously been reserved for Fox's delayed (and later canceled) Gambit film. The move was also reportedly to appease James Cameron, who had Alita: Battle Angel (2019) moved from December to February due to concerns Cameron had about releasing Alita during a crowded holiday season and did not want competition from another Fox would-be blockbuster; Kinberg and Dark Phoenix producers opposed the change, as the film was not made for a summer release and was facing heavy competition.

In January 2019, Lana Condor revealed that she was unable to return as Jubilee due to her commitment to the film To All the Boys I've Loved Before (2018). Lee Smith served as editor for the film. Visual effects were provided by MPC, MELS, Rising Sun Pictures, Rodeo FX, Scanline VFX and Soho VFX, with Phil Brennan serving as the main visual effects supervisor.

== Music ==
Hans Zimmer was reported to compose music for the film in January 2018, despite his statement in March 2016, saying that he had officially retired from the "superhero business", following his experience working on Batman v Superman: Dawn of Justice (2016). In another interview that September, Zimmer justified his statement on his conversations with Ron Howard, who convinced him not keep to a "blanket" view and avoid an entire genre, instead focusing on waiting for the right story. Impressed by Kinberg's narration and vision, Zimmer agreed to join the production, and wrote new themes for X-Men, Magneto, and the Phoenix, and omitted previously established themes written by John Ottman. The score album was released by Fox Music on June 7, 2019, alongside the film.

The soundtrack initially received a mixed critical response. A second album, entitled Xperiments from Dark Phoenix, featuring previously unreleased music written for the film, was announced in late July, after the material (consisting of a two-disc set, with the additional score in the second disc), was remained unreleased and fan-led petitions to release the score was made. Fox Music and Zimmer's studio company Remote Control Productions released the album on August 5, 2019, which received a fairly positive response.

== Marketing ==
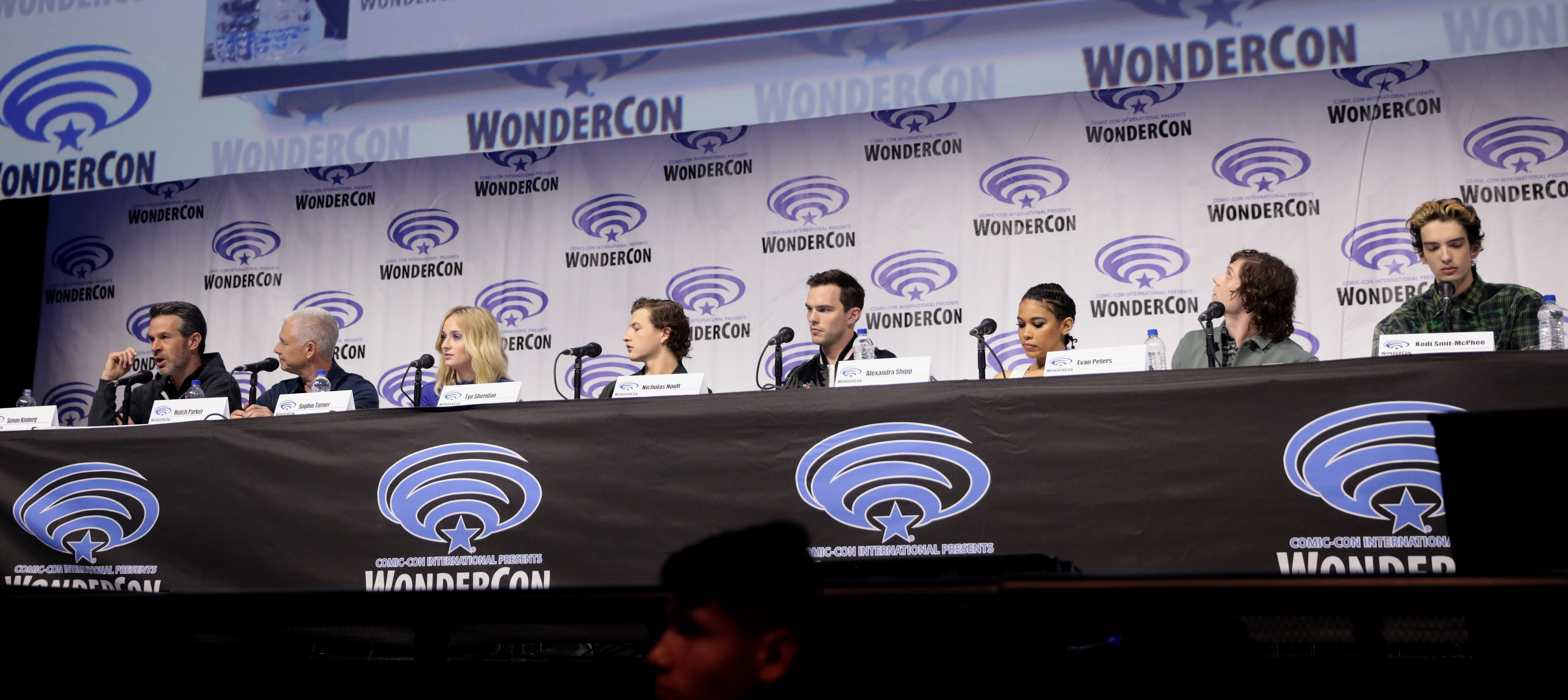
(left to right) Writer-director Simon Kinberg, producer Hutch Parker, and stars Sophie Turner, Tye Sheridan, Nicholas Hoult, Alexandra Shipp, Evan Peters, and Kodi Smit-McPhee promoting Dark Phoenix at the 2019 WonderCon.

On September 26, 2018, Turner revealed the first trailer for Dark Phoenix on The Late Late Show with James Corden before Fox released it online. Responses to the trailer widely considered it to be too similar to X-Men: The Last Stand. Graeme McMillan and Aaron Couch of The Hollywood Reporter wrote that this feeling could have been avoided if the trailer had shown more of the film's space and alien elements, which would have differentiated it from the Last Stand adaptation. Scott Mendelson at Forbes called the trailer "dull," and said that its focusing on the characters, rather than big effects or action, was a risk by Fox, given that audiences have indicated through the box office numbers of X-Men: Apocalypse that they are not necessarily interested in this version of the X-Men characters. The trailer was watched 8 million times within 24 hours on Fox's YouTube channel, but received 44 million views within that same time period across Chinese social media platforms, leading to Fox re-focusing their release plans on China.

A second trailer was released on February 27, 2019, followed by a third and final trailer on April 17. Some press estimated that Fox spent a total of around $90 million promoting the film.

In March 2019, Vanity Fair reported that the film faced promotional difficulties because long-term employees of the Fox marketing team had been laid-off after Fox's merger with Disney. They reported that a Fox marketing executive said: "We know when we are dropping a trailer, but we are nowhere near where we should be at this time. It's frightening. I would be mad if I were a filmmaker." Similar reports were made after the film's release, with The Hollywood Reporter stating that, based on an NRG tracking poll taken in May, the film had lower awareness rates than any other film in the series. Deadline Hollywood reported that they had been hearing about the marketing campaign being in disarray since February and cited this as a major factor in the film's financial failure. They also reported that Disney had attempted to integrate the film into their marketing department, but they did not have enough time, which Kinberg confirmed in a KCRW podcast.

On May 23, 2019, a music video for "Extraordinary Being" by Emeli Sandé was released, which featured footage from Dark Phoenix.

== Release ==
=== Theatrical ===
Dark Phoenix, which was distributed by 20th Century Fox, had its world premiere on June 4, 2019, at the TCL Chinese Theatre in Hollywood, California, Its United States theatrical release began on June 7, 2019. The film was titled X-Men: Dark Phoenix outside of the United States.

=== Home media ===
Dark Phoenix was released in the US on digital download by 20th Century Fox Home Entertainment on September 3, 2019, and was released on Ultra HD Blu-ray, Blu-ray, and DVD on September 17. On June 3, 2021, Disney announced that Dark Phoenix would be available to stream on Disney+ starting September 3.

== Reception ==
=== Box office ===
Dark Phoenix grossed $65.9 million in the United States and Canada, and $186.6 million in other territories, for a worldwide total of $252.4 million. Deadline Hollywood calculated the net loss of the film to be $133 million, when factoring together all expenses and revenues.

In the United States and Canada, Dark Phoenix was released alongside The Secret Life of Pets 2, and was initially projected to gross $50–60 million from 3,721 theaters in its opening weekend, with the studio expecting a $50-million debut. However, after making $14 million on its first day, including $5 million from Thursday night previews, projections were lowered to $34 million. It ended up debuting to $32.8 million (49.9% of total gross), finishing second behind The Secret Life of Pets 2. This was, at the time, the lowest opening weekend total of any film in the franchise by $20 million and the first time an X-Men film did not top the box office the week of its release. In its second weekend, the film fell 72% to $9.4 million, finishing fifth. The following weekend, the film was pulled from 1,667 theaters and made $3.5 million, finishing tenth.

In other territories, the film was projected to gross $120–135 million, including $50–60 million from China, for a global debut of around $170 million. It ended up debuting to just $104 million internationally and $137 million worldwide. Its largest markets were China ($31.9 million), South Korea ($5.6 million), Mexico ($4.8 million) and the United Kingdom ($4.8 million).

=== Critical response ===
The film received mixed-to-negative reviews from critics. On Rotten Tomatoes, Dark Phoenix holds an approval rating of 22% based on 384 reviews and has an average rating of 4.6/10. The site's critical consensus reads: "Dark Phoenix ends an era of the X-Men franchise by taking a second stab at adapting a classic comics arc—with deeply disappointing results." It is the lowest-rated installment of the X-Men film series on the website. On Metacritic, the film has a weighted average score of 43 out of 100 based on 52 critics, indicating "mixed or average" reviews. Audiences polled by CinemaScore gave the film an average grade of "B−" on an A+ to F scale, and those at PostTrak gave it an overall positive score of 69% (with an average 3 out of 5 stars) and a 49% "definite recommend".

Writing for TheWrap, William Bibbiani said of the film: "It would be wonderful to report that Dark Phoenix was an impressive send-off to this long-running franchise... Instead it's just a disappointingly average superhero flick, with a familiar story, disinterested actors, some cool action sequences, and a whole lot of missed opportunities." Michael Phillips of the Chicago Tribune gave the film 1.5 out of 4 stars and said, "It's hard to even render an opinion on the discrete strengths and weaknesses of a franchise that has devolved to the point of Dark Phoenix, a lavishly brutal chore nearly as violent as the Wolverine movie Logan and a movie featuring more death by impalement and whirling metal than all the Saw movies put together."

Matt Goldberg of Collider gave the film a grade of "D" and wrote, "When Marvel Studios inevitably reboots X-Men, a movie like Dark Phoenix will be a forgotten relic. The characters and their world deserve better, but we'll have to wait until their next evolution." Kurt Loder of Reason magazine wrote, "There are several things wrong with Dark Phoenix. I'm tempted to say everything is wrong with it, except that the picture is largely in focus and the credits appear to be correctly spelled. Other than that, though..." Rodrigo Perez of The Playlist said: "Its atrocious, expository dialogue, cumbersome plot, whiplashing character motivations, unintentionally funny moments, and often corny costumes ensure Dark Phoenix will be remembered in the annals of mediocre movies."

Conversely, Variety's Owen Gleiberman summarized his positive review with, "The X-Men franchise wraps up... with a functionally plotted sequel that attains a note of ominous majesty, thanks to Sophie Turner's presence as an X-Woman consumed by the awesomeness of her power."

Kate Erbland of Indiewire and Anne Cohen of Refinery29 criticized certain moments of the film, particularly a moment in which Raven suggests that the name of the team be changed to the "X-Women", for attempting to pander to female audiences, which they described as "cheeky", "inorganic" and "condescending". They compared these to similar moments in other blockbuster films, and Erbland felt that they distracted from more constructive aspects of its female-centric perspective. Nikolay Nikolov of Mashable wrote that the feminist messages of the film were "a refreshing attempt to fix some of the mistakes made in the past". However, in the behind the scenes feature The Making of Dark Phoenix, both the cast and crew state they did not intend to make a feminist message.

Kinberg took responsibility for the film's poor reception, stating: "I'm here, I'm saying when a movie doesn't work, put it on me. I'm the writer-director, the movie didn't connect with audiences, that's on me."

=== Accolades ===
The film was nominated for two Golden Raspberry Awards, but did not win either of them. It was nominated in the category Worst Prequel, Remake, Rip-off or Sequel, and Jessica Chastain was nominated as Worst Supporting Actress, but lost to Rambo: Last Blood and Rebel Wilson in Cats, respectively.

== Franchise ==
=== Canceled sequels ===
In May 2016, Kinberg said that Dark Phoenix would be the first in a new trilogy focusing on the younger versions of the original X-Men characters who had been introduced in X-Men: Apocalypse. The Phoenix story was initially planned as a two-film story, and the third film would have been a crossover with the New Mutants series based on the "Inferno" storyline. Visual effects supervisor Greg Butler stated that Dark Phoenix is meant to serve an origin story about Jean Grey becoming the Phoenix. While the cosmic side of the Dark Phoenix Saga would have been adapted in the second part of the two-film story.

Deadline Hollywood reported that the studio decided to only produce one film. However, Josh Boone later revealed that there were still plans to eventually make another Dark Phoenix movie up until reshoots occurred. After the acquisition of 21st Century Fox by Disney, the filmmakers on Dark Phoenix and New Mutants had to remove elements that would make it seem like there would be another X-Men movie.

Claremont confirmed the two-film plan and revealed that this film centers on Jean as Phoenix and the second was going to feature Dark Phoenix. According to Claremont, the film's purpose is to make the audience fall in love with Jean, while the purpose of the second was to break their hearts.

In June 2017, it was rumored that the Shi'ar alien race would be featured in the film, and Angelina Jolie was being looked at for a role, though she was not expected to accept the part. Chastain was also potentially being considered for the same character. Chastain herself had admitted her character kept changing, adding that she did not even know that her character was named Vuk until she saw the movie.

Claremont remarked, "My problem with both iterations of Dark Phoenix onscreen, the original by Brett Ratner and the newer version by Simon Kinberg, is, I don't think you can do it effectively in 90 minutes. You can tell a good story in that timeframe, which I think Simon did, but it's not the evocation of the story that Dave and John and Paul and I created, it doesn't have the impact of knowing the characters and their dynamics and building to it conclusively in this narrative way... The challenge is, in terms of a canon like X-Men, it's more like Harry Potter and Hogwarts, or Game of Thrones. It needs time and space to evolve and to bring the reader or viewer in and give them a result that's worth the investment of that time."

Kinberg stated that, if he had four hours to tell the story, he would have included the Hellfire Club and Lilandra Neramani. In 2023, Kinberg stated that he wished he had more state with Dark Phoenix story and stated his plans for a sequel.

=== Marvel Cinematic Universe ===
In March 2019, Marvel Studios president Kevin Feige was reported to have approached several members of the original X-Men cast. This was later confirmed by Patrick Stewart, who was asked to reprise his role as Professor X and did so in Doctor Strange in the Multiverse of Madness (2022). The writer of the film Michael Waldron stated that this was an alternate version of the character, but confirmed that the X-Men series was canon to the MCU multiverse.
