= D'Bari =

Fictional Marvel Comics extraterrestrial species

Publication information
- Publisher: Marvel Comics
- First appearance: The Avengers #4 (March 1964)
- Created by: Stan Lee (writer); Jack Kirby (artist)

Characteristics
- Place of origin: D'Bari IV

The D'Bari are a fictional alien race appearing in American comic books published by Marvel Comics. They are most known as the people whose star system was destroyed by Phoenix during the Dark Phoenix Saga (1980).

The D'Bari appeared in the 2019 film Dark Phoenix with their leader Vuk portrayed by Jessica Chastain.

== Publication history ==
The D'Bari first appeared in Avengers #4 (March 1964), the same issue in which Captain America was introduced to the modern Marvel Universe, and were created by Stan Lee and Jack Kirby. Most of the D'Bari were killed when Jean Grey destroyed D'Bari IV in Uncanny X-Men #135 (July 1980).

Since that time, the D'Bari have been shown in flashback in Classic X-Men #43 (January 1990). In later appearances, it is established that a small number of D'Bari survived by not being on their homeworld at the time of its destruction.

== Fictional race biography ==
The D'Bari are a humanoid plant-like species native to the fourth planet of the D'Bari system, located within the sphere of influence of the Shi'ar empire. The species are introduced when Vuk, a D'Bari who was stranded on Earth centuries prior, allies with Namor and petrifies the Avengers so he can retrieve his spaceship from underwater and leave Earth. Captain America, who was not among the petrified Avengers, promises to free Vuk's ship in return for restoring the Avengers. Vuk agrees to this and helps stop Namor before leaving Earth.

During "The Dark Phoenix Saga", Jean Grey as the Dark Phoenix drains energy from the D'Bari system's sun to replenish her power, causing it to become a supernova and destroy D'Bari IV.

She protests that she does not need a matchmaker. A moment later, they all see the sun go nova, surrounded by the Phoenix effect.

Several D'Bari, including Vuk, escape the destruction of D'Bari IV by being off-world at the time. Vuk encounters a group of Xartans, shapeshifting aliens who invite him into their midst on Dandesh IV in the outer regions of the Coalsack Nebula. However, news about the destruction of his planet eventually reaches him. The Xartans pose as D'Bari in an attempt to elude the Skrulls. Soon after, the Xartans encounter Rocket Raccoon.

Eventually, the Skrulls recognize the Xartans' ruse and beam down to their outpost. Unwilling to see his replacement family destroyed again, Vuk overloads his petrifactor, turning himself, the Skrulls, and everything within a 100,000-mile radius to stone for 100 hours.

After being cured of the petrifaction, Vuk finds the Collector's "Prisonworld" and is captured to be added to the Collector's collection. While imprisoned, Vuk has a son named Bzztl via asexual reproduction. The planet is eventually found and consumed by Galactus due to the interference of Wolverine. Bzztl escapes, but Vuk goes missing.

In "Maximum Security", Vuk arrives on Earth and ambushes the X-Men. Vuk personally attacks Jean Grey to avenge the D'Bari. He recognizes that Grey is different from the entity who destroyed his planet, though he blames her. In desperation, Grey telepathically convinces Vuk that he has killed her, sending him into a state of shock.

It is later revealed that Vuk and the remaining D'Bari settled on another planet. Vuk returns to Earth and encounters Captain Britain and Meggan's infant daughter Maggie. Maggie convinces Vuk to travel to an alternate universe where D'Bari IV was not destroyed, allowing them to rebuild.

== Known D'Bari ==
- Bzztl – A D'Bari and the "son" of Vuk.
- Gvyn – A female D'Bari. She was killed when the Phoenix Force consumed D'Bari IV.
- Tas'wtza – A D'Bari who joined the Nova Corps. Killed by Kraa.
- Vuk – A D'Bari who once fought the Avengers and later developed a vendetta against Jean Grey for her massacre of the D'Bari.

== In other media ==
- The D'Bari appear in the Avengers Assemble episode "Guardians and Space Knights". This version of the species evacuated their home planet, D'Bari IV, after it was consumed by Galactus.
- The D'Bari appear in Dark Phoenix, with Vuk (portrayed by Jessica Chastain) and Jones (portrayed by Ato Essandoh) as prominent members. These versions are shapeshifting aliens whose planet was destroyed by the Phoenix Force before it possessed Jean Grey.
