= Mystique (film character) =

Fictional character in the X-Men series

- X-Men film series and Marvel Cinematic Universe character
- Rebecca Romijn as Raven Darkhölme / Mystique in X2 (2003)
- First appearance: X-Men (2000)
- Based on: Mystique by: Chris Claremont; Dave Cockrum
- Adapted by: Bryan Singer; Tom DeSanto
- Portrayed by: Rebecca Romijn (2000–2011, 2026); Jennifer Lawrence (2011–2019); Morgan Lily (2011; young)

In-universe information
- Full name: Raven Darkhölme
- Aliases: Mystique; Grace
- Species: Mutant
- Gender: Female
- Affiliation: Brotherhood of Mutants; X-Men
- Family: Charles Xavier (adopted brother)
- Significant others: Hank McCoy; Erik Lehnsherr; Azazel; Logan
- Children: Kurt Wagner (son)
- Nationality: American
- Abilities: Shapeshifting; Voice mimicry; Skilled polyglot and martial artist

Mystique is a fictional character appearing in the X-Men film series, beginning with the film X-Men in 2000. Based on the comic-book character of the same name, she is portrayed in the first three X-Men films by actress Rebecca Romijn, while in four prequel films (starting with X-Men: First Class), she was played by actress Jennifer Lawrence.

== Fictional biography ==
=== Early life ===
Raven was born in Westchester County, New York in 1934. She was found by young Charles Xavier when she breaks into his family mansion looking for food; she takes the appearance of his mother, but Charles, having manifested his telepathic mutant powers, is capable of telling the difference and invites the mutant girl to his family as a foster sister, declaring that she never has to steal food again. Charles and Raven grew up together, and she later accompanied Charles when he attended University of Oxford. In 1962, Xavier earned Ph.D.s in Genetics, Biophysics, and Psychology after doing research on genetic mutation, which brings him to the attention of CIA agent Moira MacTaggert.

=== First Class and joining the Brotherhood ===
Seeking Charles' advice on mutation, MacTaggert takes her and Charles to the CIA, where they convince Director McCone that mutants exist and that Sebastian Shaw is a threat. Another CIA officer sponsors the mutants and invites them to the secret "Division X" facility meeting young scientist Hank McCoy, a mutant with prehensile feet and enhanced intelligence, whom she forms a brief romance with.

The Central Intelligence Agency provides him access to Cerebro, which he uses to locate and recruit other mutants for the government. Including Nazi hunter Erik Lehnsherr, exotic dancer Angel Salvadore, taxi driver Armando Muñoz, Army prisoner Alex Summers and the young Sean Cassidy. Once the team is assembled, Raven comes up with the "Mystique" name as a superhero soubriquet for herself. Shaw and the Hellfire Club attack the CIA facility, kill all the human personnel including Muñoz, and persuade Salvadore to defect. Xavier retreats with Raven and the survivors to his Westchester, New York mansion to train them as an independent team of operatives to prevent nuclear war between the US and USSR as a result of the Cuban Missile Crisis. They defeat the threat, Lensherr redirects a series of missiles back toward the ships that fired them after the two governments decided to try to eliminate the mutant 'threat.' Charles intervenes when MacTaggert fires on Lehnserr and a deflected bullet strikes Xavier's spine, paralyzing him. Charles and Lehnserr part ways, with Raven joining Lehnserr's newly formed Brotherhood.

=== Original Earth-10005 variant ===
==== Assassinating Bolivar Trask ====
In the original timeline, a disillusioned Raven went to Paris in 1973 and assassinated Bolivar Trask (which was the first time she killed and how she truly became Mystique), leading the US government to incorrectly believe that all mutants were a threat to humanity and approve Trask's Sentinel program as a response. Furthermore, this leads to her being captured by government officials for scientific study, with her genome later being mapped out for use in the Sentinel program.

==== Modern day ====
In X-Men (2000), an older Mystique abducts anti-mutant senator Robert Kelly so that Magneto can execute his plan of mutating him in order to forcibly turn him into an ally, and as a trial for Magneto's greater plan of mutating the world's political leaders. The plan is eventually foiled by the X-Men. In the sequel X2 (2003), Raven uncovers evidence of William Stryker's plan to build a second Cerebro and then help Magneto escape his plastic prison by seducing one of his guards in her human form and injecting him with excess iron; Mystique and Magneto then join the X-Men in foiling Stryker's plan to use his own mutant son Jason to trick Professor X to telepathically slaughter the world's collective mutant population with Cerebro #2. The plan is foiled thanks to Magneto's helmet which makes him immune to Jason's and the professor's telepathy. Mystique then leaves with Magneto. In X-Men: The Last Stand (2006), Raven has been captured by the government and was interrogated by them. She was later held in a mobile mutant prison; this time Magneto saves her from imprisonment. She loses her powers due to a new "cure" against mutant powers, and is abandoned by Magneto for that reason. Raven then turns to the government to give them info about Magneto's base of operations. Unknown to Raven, Magneto, and Professor X, the events of The Last Stand and her earlier assassination of Trask and capture in 1973 eventually lead to a dystopian future where mutants are hunted to near extinction by unstoppable super-Sentinels partially created from her DNA.

=== Revised Earth-10005 variant ===
This leads up the events of X-Men: Days of Future Past (2014), which ultimately sees the creation of a new, second timeline from 1973 onwards. The diverging point is that Logan, Magneto, Charles Xavier and Beast distract her from killing Bolivar Trask in Paris, allowing him to escape. Magneto then decides to kill Raven in order to safeguard their future; he fails, and this results in her blood being spilled on the street for Trask's associates to obtain, leading to another possibility for the dystopian future to come to pass. Raven does not give up trying to kill Trask, but her plan to kill him publicly outside the White House in Washington D.C. is disrupted by the arrival of Magneto, who had decided to put forth the full extent of his formidable mutant powers to compromise eight Sentinel robot prototypes and then kill president Richard Nixon to warn humanity of the extreme dangers of opposing the mutants. A distraction from Logan and Beast allows Raven to knock Magneto out and save Nixon; she then considers going through with killing Trask anyway, but is talked out of it once and for all by Charles. Her saving the president, along with sparing Trask and the latter being prosecuted for trying to sell US military secrets to Vietnamese government officials, leads to the cancellation of the Sentinel program and the Days of Future Past timeline in 2023 being unmade. The films X-Men: Apocalypse (2016) and Dark Phoenix (2019) then follows this new timeline.

Mystique later appears in the 2016 sequel X-Men: Apocalypse, where she saves the young mutant, Nightcrawler, in the year 1983. She returns with him at the X-Mansion and she reunites with Charles and Hank to inform them of Magneto's return. Later on in the film, Mystique teams up with the X-Men and becomes their leader by the end of the film. During the films last scene, she wears a white uniform similar to her comic counterpart and leads the latest additions to the X-Men team.

In the 2019 sequel, Dark Phoenix, Mystique is shown leading the X-Men in a space rescue mission. After her teammate Jean Grey gains the power of the Phoenix force, Mystique tries to help her, but is inadvertently killed by Jean after being launched back and impaled by shards of wood.

== Development ==
Mystique was originally created as a comic book character by David Cockrum. Chris Claremont saw Cockrum's design, dubbed the character "Mystique", and, with Cockrum's permission, set her in Ms. Marvel #16 (May 1978). The character's true appearance was revealed in Ms. Marvel #18 (June 1978) and first cover appearance in The Avengers Annual #10 (1981).

=== Casting ===
Actresses Lucy Liu, Gina Gershon and Jeri Ryan were all rumoured to have auditioned for the role in X-Men (2000) in 1999. Amber Heard reportedly auditioned for the role of Raven / Mystique in X-Men - First Class. Jennifer Lawrence signed a contract for three films but also returned for Dark Phoenix, stating that she did not want to leave her character's fate hanging. The role of the young Raven in X-Men: First Class was played by then 10-year-old child actress Morgan Lily. Aside from the actresses, Vicki Phillips served as stuntwoman to Rebbeca Romijn-Stamos and Renae Moneymaker for Jennifer Lawrence.

In February 2022, during an interview with ComicBook.com about her work on Star Trek: Strange New Worlds, Romijn expressed doubts as to whether Marvel Studios would wish to bring her back as Mystique or not for the Marvel Cinematic Universe in light of Patrick Stewart's then-upcoming reprisal as Professor X in Doctor Strange in the Multiverse of Madness (2022), but stated that she would be open to reprise her role as Mystique if she were offered to return due to how much she enjoyed working on the X-Men films. Romijn was later confirmed to be reprising her role as Mystique for Avengers: Doomsday (2026).

=== Makeup and special effects ===
Jennifer Lawrence as Mystique in the 2014 film X-Men: Days of Future Past.

In order to prepare Rebecca Romijn-Stamos for playing the role, the special effects makeup team covered her with silicone prosthestics on three quarters of her body, with the remaining spots being painted blue. This process took eight hours to apply and two to remove, forcing Romijn-Stamos to undertake 24-hour workdays to play the role. Mystique morphing to or from other characters were handled through computer-generated imagery. This was cut down to six-and-a-half hours at the end of the filming of X-Men (2000), while for X2 (2003), it had been cut down to four-and-a-half hours. The prosthetics were devised by makeup specialist Gordon Smith, who made them out of a combination of silicone and latex, which made them self-adhesive and not requiring any glue while also being recyclable. Smith claimed Mystique to be the most challenging character to create makeup for, and that his materials were also used for Sabretooth's makeup.

Romijn-Stamos explains, about the difficulties of playing the role, that

...day after day, [the makeup] starts removing layers of skin. So, now you're pink and flesh, and it's awful, and then, to break down the paint, they put this chemical on you. And if you leave it on for too long, it starts burning your skin. So I had to run from the makeup trailer to the shower trailer, which they set up for Alan [Cumming] and me. Misery loves company. [...] We would get in there with all of this stuff on our faces and bodies and our skin would start to burn, but no water would come out. The trailer was so beautifully appointed, but it didn't work half the time. It was awful. Alan literally walked in on me in tears sometimes. It was seriously painful.

The process was reportedly even worse for Jennifer Lawrence, who suffered from blisters on her skin from the chemicals and required medical assistance during the filming of X-Men: First Class; this was solved for the sequel X-Men: Days of Future Past, where a full body suit was made for her instead. The producers were able to reduce Lawrence's time to have her makeup finished down from seven or eight hours in First Class to three or four hours in Days of Future Past.

== Characterization ==
=== Differences from the comics ===
In the comics, Mystique had originally started as a minor adversary to Carol Danvers (Ms. Marvel) before reappearing in the X-Men comics. Mystique's role especially in the prequel films is vastly different and magnified compared with the original from the comics. The change has been a source of dissension among fans and critics. The change in prominence has been explained as partially being due to Jennifer Lawrence growing fame since X-Men: First Class, starring as the main heroine Katniss Everdeen in The Hunger Games (2012) and winning the Best Actress Oscar award for Silver Linings Playbook (2012). Her extensive backstory with Charles Xavier is completely original to the prequel films, not being alluded to in the comics or even in the original 2000-2006 trilogy.

Mystique being a colder, more cynical character in the first three films has been speculated to be due to her being captured by Bolivar Trask's associates, with Trask stating that he wanted bone marrow and brain tissue from her for research purposes, a process which might potentially have left her personality changed. In the new timeline created with Days of Future Past, this never happens and she instead saves the president and becomes a reluctant hero to humans and mutants alike, especially to Storm and Jean Grey, who both state her to be an idol to them.

A notable difference between X-Men: Days of Future Past and the comics is that in Chris Claremont's comic book storyline, Mystique led the Brotherhood of Mutants in an attempt to assassinate senator Robert Kelly; in the film, she is instead attempting to assassinate Bolivar Trask and is doing so on her own, though the outcome would be largely the same, with the X-Men trying to stop Mystique.

In the comics, Mystique is the former partner of Azazel; according to X-Men: Dark Phoenix director Simon Kinberg, the film version of Mystique is the daughter of Azazel instead of his lover, though this was not revealed in the films. She also has a son, Graydon Creed, with Sabretooth in the comics, which is also left out of the films. The comic book version has been noted for having slowed or possibly even halted aging due to her unique physiology; whether she has this ability in the film series has not been explained. In the comics, Mystique is mostly seen wearing white clothes over her blue body, which she did not wear until X-Men: Apocalypse.

Other notable differences is that the comic book version has been depicted as bisexual, has only worked with Magneto during the AXIS crossover, does not have the same fighting skills as shown in the films (relying more on weapons in the comics), was essentially an adoptive mother to Rogue and does not appear naked as she often does in the films; the whole backstory with Rogue was absent from the film series' storyline.

== Reception ==
Reviews of the earlier films tended to give only passing mention to the character, with Roger Ebert, reviewing X2, noting only that she is "a shapeshifter whose shapes are mostly delightful". Todd McCarthy of The Hollywood Reporter wrote of Lawrence's debut of the character in the prequel films that "Lawrence is at her most appealing when conveying an ashamed insecurity about her natural looks, which she can conceal with a human facade", while Justin Chang of Variety wrote that Lawrence and Nicholas Hoult "register poignantly as two young individuals trying to figure out their unique place in a hostile world".

Sean O'Connell of CinemaBlend wrote that in X-Men: Days of Future Past, Mystique "is treated as a significant threat to this on-screen universe, but her motivations are muddy, at best". Steve Rose of The Guardian said that Mystique is "key to the success of the mission, but despite being able to alter her appearance however she wishes, she's obliged to spend most of the film prancing around virtually naked save for blue body paint".

=== Accolades ===
Year	Actress	Film	Award	Category	Result
2001	Rebecca Romjin	X-Men	Blockbuster Entertainment Awards	Blockbuster Entertainment Award, Favorite Supporting Actress – Science Fiction	Won
2001	Rebecca Romjin	X-Men	27th Saturn Awards	Best Supporting Actress	Won
2003	Rebecca Romjin	X2	2003 Teen Choice Awards	Teen Choice Award, Choice Movie Actress – Drama/Action-Adventure	Nominated
2003	Rebecca Romjin	X2	2003 Teen Choice Awards	Teen Choice Award, Choice Movie – Liar	Nominated
2011	Jennifer Lawrence	X-Men: First Class	2011 Teen Choice Awards	Choice Movie: Breakout Actress	Nominated
2011	Jennifer Lawrence	X-Men: First Class	2011 Teen Choice Awards	Choice Movie: Chemistry (shared with Lucas Till, Nicholas Hoult, Zoë Kravitz, Caleb Landry Jones and Edi Gathegi)	Nominated
2011	Jennifer Lawrence	X-Men: First Class	2011 Scream Awards	Best Fantasy Actress	Nominated
2012	Jennifer Lawrence	X-Men: First Class	2012 People's Choice Awards	Favorite Movie Superhero	Nominated
2014	Jennifer Lawrence	X-Men: Days of Future Past	Teen Choice Awards	Choice Movie Actress: Sci-Fi/Fantasy	Won
2014	Jennifer Lawrence	X-Men: Days of Future Past	Young Hollywood Awards	Fan Favorite Actor – Female	Nominated
2016	Jennifer Lawrence	X-Men: Apocalypse	2016 People's Choice Awards	Favorite Movie Actress	Won

== Merchandise ==
Mystique has been released several times as an action figure as part of Marvel Legends Series, with a 2020 release depicting Rebecca Romijn's version for the 20th anniversary of the X-Men (2000) film. An action figure of Mystique from X-Men: Days of Future Past was displayed on Chicago Comic & Entertainment Expo in 2014, but was later announced to have been cancelled from official release after Jennifer Lawrence did not approve of licensing her likeness.

Aside from officially licensed material, the cinematic version of Mystique has also been depicted as costumes, 3D prints, and in cosplaying by fans.
