= Marvel Games =

Video game licensor

- Logo used since 2024
- Type: Division
- Industry: Video games
- Founded: March 11, 2009; 17 years ago
- Headquarters: Glendale, California, United States
- Key people: Haluk Mentes (General Manager); Tim Hernandez (Vice President, Product & Creative); Bill Rosemann (Vice President, Creative Director); Tim Tsang (Executive Director, Product & Creative); Eric Monacelli (Executive Producer)
- Parent: Disney Games Group
- Website: marvel.com/games

Marvel Games is the video game brand and division responsible for licensing and overseeing video games based on Marvel properties. It is part of the Disney Games Group, within Disney Entertainment. Prior to the incorporation of Marvel Games, video games based on Marvel properties were handled by Marvel Comics Group from 1982 to 1985, Marvel Entertainment Group from 1986 to 1998, and subsequently by Marvel Enterprises until the establishment of Marvel Games.

== History ==
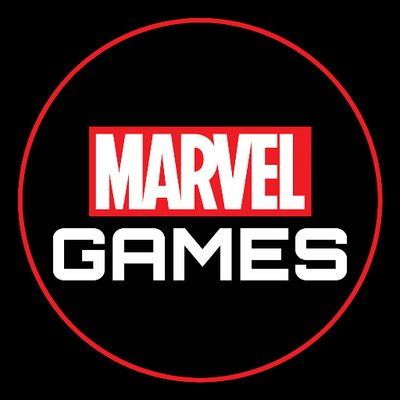
Original Marvel Games logo, used until 2024

Marvel Games was established in March 2009 as a dedicated video game group within Marvel Entertainment, responsible for overseeing games based on Marvel properties and working with external developers and publishers. Later that year, Marvel Entertainment was acquired by The Walt Disney Company.

In 2014, Jay Ong joined Marvel as vice president of games and led a strategic overhaul of the division. Marvel Games moved toward closer collaboration with developers, greater creative freedom and a more selective approach to licensing, with an increased emphasis on original games rather than titles tied directly to film releases. In 2016, Disney discontinued Disney Infinity and its internally developed console-game business, shifting its console strategy toward licensing its intellectual properties to outside developers and publishers. Marvel Games continued this partnership-based model, collaborating with outside studios on titles including Marvel's Spider-Man, Marvel's Guardians of the Galaxy, Marvel Snap and Marvel Rivals.

As part of Disney's corporate restructuring in 2023, the company's global games business was placed within its parks and experiences segment. In March 2026, Disney moved its Games and Digital Entertainment organization into Disney Entertainment. Marvel Games subsequently became part of the Disney Games Group, alongside Disney & Pixar Games, Lucasfilm Games and 20th Century Games.

== List of video games ==
=== 1980s ===
Title	Date	Property	Platform(s)	Publisher(s)	Ref
Spider-Man	1982	Spider-Man	Atari 2600	Parker Brothers	
Questprobe featuring The Hulk	1984	Hulk	Apple II, Atari 8-bit, BBC Micro, browser, Commodore 16, Commodore Plus/4, Commodore 64, DOS, Dragon 32/64, Acorn Electron, ZX Spectrum	Adventure International	
Questprobe featuring Spider-Man	1984	Spider-Man	Apple II, Atari 8-bit, Atari ST, BBC Micro, browser, Commodore 16, Commodore Plus/4, Commodore 64, M-DOS, Electron, ZX Spectrum, MSX	Adventure International	
Questprobe: Featuring Human Torch and the Thing	1985	Fantastic Four	Amstrad CPC, Apple II, Atari 8-bit, Commodore 64, MS-DOS, Electron, ZX Spectrum	Adventure International	
Howard the Duck	1986	Howard the Duck	Amstrad CPC, Apple II, Commodore 64, MSX, ZX Spectrum	Activision	
Captain America in: The Doom Tube of Dr. Megalomann	1987	Captain America	Atari ST, Amiga, Amstrad CPC, Commodore 64, ZX Spectrum	Mikro-Gen	
The Amazing Spider-Man and Captain America in Dr. Doom's Revenge!	1989	crossover	Amiga, Amstrad CPC, Atari ST, Commodore 64, MS-DOS, ZX Spectrum	Empire Interactive, Paragon Software	
The Uncanny X-Men	1989	X-Men	NES	LJN	
X-Men: Madness in Murderworld	1989	X-Men	MS-DOS, Commodore 64, Amiga	Paragon Software	

=== 1990s ===
Title	Date	Property	Platform(s)	Publisher(s)	Ref
X-Men II: The Fall of the Mutants	1990	X-Men	MS-DOS	Paragon Software	
The Amazing Spider-Man	1990	Spider-Man	Amiga, MS-DOS, Commodore 64, Atari ST	Paragon Software	
The Punisher	1990	The Punisher	Amiga, Atari ST, MS-DOS	MicroProse	
The Amazing Spider-Man	1990	Spider-Man	Game Boy	LJN, Nintendo	
Silver Surfer	1990	Silver Surfer	NES	Arcadia Systems	
The Punisher	1991	The Punisher	NES	LJN/Acclaim	
The Punisher: The Ultimate Payback!	1991	The Punisher	Game Boy	Acclaim	
Spider-Man vs. The Kingpin	1991	Spider-Man	Genesis, Master System, Game Gear, Sega CD	Sega	
Spider-Man: The Video Game	1991	Spider-Man	Arcade	Sega	
Wolverine	1991	Wolverine	NES	LJN/Acclaim	
Captain America and The Avengers	1991	Avengers	Arcade, NES, SNES, Genesis, Game Gear, Game Boy	Data East, Mindscape	
X-Men	1992	X-Men	Arcade, PlayStation 3, Xbox 360, iOS, Android	Konami	
The Amazing Spider-Man 2	1992	Spider-Man	Game Boy	LJN/Acclaim	
Spider-Man: Return of the Sinister Six	1992	Spider-Man	NES, Master System, Game Gear	LJN/Acclaim	
Spider-Man and the X-Men in Arcade's Revenge	1992	crossover	Genesis, SNES, Game Boy, Game Gear	LJN/Acclaim	
X-Men	1993	X-Men	Genesis	Sega	
The Punisher	1993	The Punisher	Arcade, Genesis	Capcom	
The Amazing Spider-Man 3: Invasion of the Spider-Slayers	1993	Spider-Man	Game Boy	LJN/Acclaim	
X-Men	1994	X-Men	Game Gear	Sega	
The Incredible Hulk	1994	Hulk	SNES, Genesis, Master System, Game Gear	U.S. Gold	
Spider-Man and Venom: Maximum Carnage	1994	Spider-Man/Venom	Genesis, SNES	LJN/Acclaim	
Wolverine: Adamantium Rage	1994	Wolverine	Genesis, SNES	LJN/Acclaim	
X-Men: Mutant Apocalypse	1994	X-Men	SNES	Capcom	
X-Men: Children of the Atom	1994	X-Men (Guest: Street Fighter's Akuma)	Arcade, Saturn, MS-DOS, PlayStation	Capcom, Acclaim	
X-Men 2: Clone Wars	1995	X-Men	Genesis	Sega	
X-Men: Gamesmaster's Legacy	1995	X-Men	Game Gear	Sega	
Spider-Man	1995	Spider-Man	Genesis, SNES	LJN/Acclaim	
The Amazing Spider-Man: Lethal Foes	1995	Spider-Man	Super Famicom	Epoch Co.	
Marvel Super Heroes	1995	crossover (Guest: Darkstalkers' Anita)	Arcade, Sega Saturn, PlayStation	Capcom, Virgin Interactive	
Venom/Spider-Man: Separation Anxiety	1995	Venom/Spider-Man	SNES, Genesis, Windows	Acclaim	
Avengers in Galactic Storm	1996	Avengers	Arcade	Data East	
The Amazing Spider-Man: Web of Fire	1996	Spider-Man	Sega 32X	Sega	
X-Men vs. Street Fighter	1996	X-Men crossover	Arcade, Sega Saturn, PlayStation	Capcom, Virgin Interactive	
Marvel Super Heroes in War of the Gems	1996	crossover	SNES	Capcom	
X-Men: Mojo World	1996	X-Men	Game Gear, Master System	Sega	
Iron Man and X-O Manowar in Heavy Metal	1996	Iron Man crossover	PlayStation, Saturn, Game Boy, Game Gear, MS-DOS	Acclaim	
Spider-Man: The Sinister Six	1996	Spider-Man	MS-DOS, Windows	Byron Priess Multimedia	
The Incredible Hulk: The Pantheon Saga	1997	Hulk	PlayStation, Saturn, MS-DOS	Eidos Interactive	
Marvel Super Heroes vs. Street Fighter	1997	crossover	Arcade, Sega Saturn, PlayStation	Capcom	
Fantastic Four	1997	Fantastic Four	PlayStation	Acclaim	
Men in Black: The Game	1997	The Men in Black	Windows, PlayStation	Gigawatt Studios, SouthPeak Interactive	
X-Men: The Ravages of Apocalypse	1997	X-Men	Windows, MS-DOS, Linux, Mac	WizardWorks	
Marvel vs. Capcom: Clash of Super Heroes	1998	crossover	Arcade, PlayStation, Dreamcast	Capcom, Virgin Interactive	

=== 2000s ===
Title	Date	Property	Platform(s)	Publisher(s)	Ref
Marvel vs. Capcom 2: New Age of Heroes	2000	crossover	Arcade, Dreamcast, PlayStation 2, Xbox, PlayStation 3, Xbox 360	Capcom, Virgin Interactive	
X-Men: Mutant Academy	2000	X-Men	PlayStation, Game Boy Color	Activision	
Spider-Man	2000	Spider-Man	Dreamcast, MacOS, Nintendo 64, PlayStation, Windows, Game Boy Color	Activision	
Blade	2000	Blade	Game Boy Color, PlayStation	Activision	
X-Men: Mutant Wars	2000	X-Men	Game Boy Color	Activision	
X-Men: Wolverine's Rage	2001	X-Men	Game Boy Color	Activision	
Spider-Man 2: The Sinister Six	2001	Spider-Man	Game Boy Color	Activision	
Spider-Man 2: Enter Electro	2001	Spider-Man	PlayStation	Activision	
X-Men: Mutant Academy 2	2001	X-Men (Guest: Spider-Man)	PlayStation	Activision	
Spider-Man: Mysterio's Menace	2001	Spider-Man	Game Boy Advance	Activision	
X-Men: Reign of Apocalypse	2001	X-Men	Game Boy Advance	Activision	
Men in Black: The Series – Crashdown	2001	The Men in Black	PlayStation	Infogrames	
Men in Black II: Alien Escape	2002	The Men in Black	GameCube, PlayStation 2	Infogrames	
Spider-Man	2002	Spider-Man	PlayStation 2, GameCube, Xbox, Game Boy Advance, Windows	Activision	
X-Men: Next Dimension	2002	X-Men	PlayStation 2, Xbox, GameCube	Activision	
Blade II	2002	Blade	PlayStation 2, Xbox	Activision	
The Invincible Iron Man	2002	Iron Man	Game Boy Advance	Activision	
Daredevil	2003	Daredevil	Game Boy Advance	Encore, Inc.	
The Incredible Hulk	2003	Hulk	Game Boy Advance	Universal Interactive	
Hulk	2003	Hulk	GameCube, PlayStation 2, Xbox, Windows	Universal Interactive	
X2: Wolverine's Revenge	2003	X-Men	GameCube, Mac, PlayStation 2, Windows, Xbox, Game Boy Advance	Activision	
Spider-Man 2	2004	Spider-Man	GameCube, Windows, PlayStation 2, Xbox, Game Boy Advance, N-Gage, Mac, Nintendo DS, PlayStation Portable	Activision, MacPlay, Taito	
Spider-Man 2: The Hero Returns	2004	Spider-Man	BREW, J2ME	Sony Pictures Mobile	
Blade: Trinity	2004	Blade	BREW, J2ME	Mforma	
X-Men Legends	2004	X-Men	PlayStation 2, GameCube, Xbox, N-Gage	Activision	
X-Men Legends II: Rise of Apocalypse	2005	X-Men	GameCube, Windows, N-Gage, PlayStation 2, PlayStation Portable, Xbox, mobile phone	Activision	
Fantastic Four	2005	Fantastic Four	PlayStation 2, Xbox, GameCube, Windows, Game Boy Advance	Activision	
Fantastic Four: Flame On	2005	Fantastic Four	Game Boy Advance	Activision	
Ultimate Spider-Man	2005	Spider-Man	Nintendo DS, GameCube, PlayStation 2, Xbox, Windows, Game Boy Advance	Activision	
Elektra	2005	Elektra	Mobile phone	Mforma	
The Punisher	2005	The Punisher	PlayStation 2, Xbox, Windows, mobile phone	THQ	
The Incredible Hulk: Ultimate Destruction	2005	Hulk	PlayStation 2, Xbox, GameCube	Vivendi Universal Games	
Marvel Nemesis: Rise of the Imperfects	2005	crossover	GameCube, PlayStation 2, PlayStation Portable, Nintendo DS, Xbox	Electronic Arts	
X-Men: The Official Game	2006	X-Men	Game Boy Advance, Windows, Nintendo DS, GameCube, PlayStation 2, Xbox, Xbox 360	Activision	
Marvel: Ultimate Alliance	2006	crossover	Xbox, PlayStation 2, Windows, Xbox 360, Game Boy Advance, PlayStation Portable, Wii, PlayStation 3, PlayStation 4, Xbox One	Activision	
Spider-Man: Battle for New York	2006	Spider-Man	Game Boy Advance, Nintendo DS	Activision	
Spider-Man 3	2007	Spider-Man	Game Boy Advance, Windows, Nintendo DS, PlayStation 2, PlayStation 3, PlayStation Portable, Wii, Xbox 360, TV game, mobile phone	Activision	
Fantastic Four: Rise of the Silver Surfer	2007	Fantastic Four	Nintendo DS, Wii, Xbox 360, PlayStation 2, PlayStation 3	2K Games	
Ghost Rider	2007	Ghost Rider	PlayStation 2, PlayStation Portable, Game Boy Advance	2K Games	
Spider-Man: Friend or Foe	2007	Spider-Man	Xbox 360, PlayStation 2, Nintendo DS, Wii, Windows, PlayStation Portable	Activision	
Marvel Trading Card Game	2007	crossover	PlayStation Portable, Nintendo DS, Windows	Konami	
Iron Man	2008	Iron Man	PlayStation 2, PlayStation 3, PlayStation Portable, Wii, Nintendo DS, Xbox 360, Windows, mobile phone	Sega	
The Incredible Hulk	2008	Hulk	Nintendo DS, PlayStation 2, PlayStation 3, Wii, Windows, Xbox 360	Sega	
Spider-Man: Web of Shadows	2008	Spider-Man	Windows, Nintendo DS, PlayStation 2, PlayStation 3, PlayStation Portable, Xbox 360, Wii	Activision	
X-Men Origins: Wolverine	2009	X-Men	Windows, Nintendo DS, PlayStation 2, PlayStation 3, PlayStation Portable, Xbox 360, Wii	Activision	
The Punisher: No Mercy	2009	The Punisher	PlayStation 3 (Note: No longer available on PSN as of 2011.)	Zen Studios	
Marvel Super Hero Squad	2009	crossover	Nintendo DS, Wii, PlayStation 2, PlayStation Portable	THQ	
Marvel: Ultimate Alliance 2	2009	crossover	PlayStation 2, PlayStation 3, Xbox 360, Wii, Nintendo DS, PSP, PlayStation 4, Xbox One, Windows	Activision	
Spider-Man: Toxic City	2009	Spider-Man	Mobile phone	Marvel Comics	

=== 2010s ===
Title	Date	Property	Platform(s)	Publisher(s)	Ref
Iron Man 2	2010	Iron Man	PlayStation 3, Wii, Xbox 360, PlayStation Portable, Nintendo DS, iOS, BlackBerry	Sega/Gameloft	
Spider-Man: Shattered Dimensions	2010	Spider-Man	Xbox 360, PlayStation 3, Windows, Wii, Nintendo DS	Activision	
Marvel Super Hero Squad: The Infinity Gauntlet	2010	crossover	Xbox 360, PlayStation 3, Wii, Nintendo DS, Nintendo 3DS	THQ	
Marvel Super Heroes 3D: Grandmaster's Challenge	2010	crossover	Wii	BigBen Interactive, Neko Entertainment	
Marvel Pinball	2010	crossover	Nintendo 3DS, PlayStation 3, PlayStation Vita, Xbox 360 (available as DLC through Pinball FX 2 on Xbox 360)	Zen Studios	
Ultimate Spider-Man: Total Mayhem	2010	Spider-Man	Android, iOS	Gameloft	
Marvel vs. Capcom 3: Fate of Two Worlds	2011	crossover	PlayStation 3, Xbox 360	Capcom	
Marvel Super Hero Squad Online	2011	crossover	Windows	The Amazing Society, Gazillion Entertainment	
Thor: God of Thunder	2011	Thor	PlayStation 3, Xbox 360, Nintendo DS, Wii, Nintendo 3DS	Sega	
Thor: Son of Asgard	2011	Thor	iOS	Marvel Games	
Captain America: Super Soldier	2011	Captain America	PlayStation 3, Xbox 360, Wii, Nintendo DS, Nintendo 3DS	Sega	
Captain America: Sentinel of Liberty	2011	Captain America	Android, iOS	Marvel Games	
Spider-Man: Edge of Time	2011	Spider-Man	Nintendo DS, PlayStation 3, Wii, Xbox 360, Nintendo 3DS	Activision	
X-Men: Destiny	2011	X-Men	PlayStation 3, Wii, Xbox 360, Nintendo DS	Activision	
Marvel Super Hero Squad: Comic Combat	2011	crossover	Xbox 360, PlayStation 3, Wii	THQ	
Ultimate Marvel vs. Capcom 3	2011	crossover	Windows, PlayStation 3, Xbox 360, PlayStation Vita, PlayStation 4, Xbox One	Capcom	
Marvel Avengers Alliance	2012	crossover	Facebook, iOS, Android, Windows, Playdom.com	Playdom	
MIB: Alien Crisis	2012	The Men in Black	Xbox 360, PlayStation 3, Wii	FunLabs	
Men in Black 3	2012	The Men in Black	Android, iOS	Gameloft	
The Amazing Spider-Man	2012	Spider-Man	Nintendo DS, PlayStation 3, Wii, Wii U, Xbox 360, Nintendo 3DS, PlayStation Vita, Windows, Android, iOS	Activision/Gameloft	
Marvel vs. Capcom Origins	2012	crossover	PlayStation 3, Xbox 360	Capcom	
Marvel: War of Heroes	2012	crossover	Android, iOS	Mobage	
Marvel Avengers: Battle for Earth	2012	crossover	Wii U, Xbox 360 (Kinect)	Ubisoft Quebec	
Avengers: Initiative	2012	Avengers	Android, iOS	Marvel Games	
Iron Man 3: The Official Game	2013	Iron Man	Android, iOS	Gameloft	
Marvel Heroes	2013	crossover	Windows, Mac	Gazillion Entertainment	
Deadpool	2013	Deadpool	PlayStation 3, PlayStation 4, Xbox 360, Xbox One, Windows	Activision	
Marvel Puzzle Quest	2013	crossover	PlayStation 3, PlayStation 4, Xbox 360, Xbox One, Android, iOS, Windows, Amazon Kindle	Demiurge Studios	
Lego Marvel Super Heroes	2013	crossover	Android, iOS, Windows, Nintendo 3DS, Nintendo DS, OS X, PlayStation 3, PlayStation 4, PlayStation Vita, Xbox 360, Xbox One, Wii U, Nintendo Switch	TT Games, Warner Bros. Interactive Entertainment, Feral Interactive	
Thor The Dark World: The Official Game	2013	Thor	Android, iOS	Gameloft	
X-Men: Battle of the Atom	2014	X-Men (Guest:Deadpool)	Android, iOS	PlayNext	
Captain America: The Winter Soldier – The Official Game	2014	Captain America	Android, iOS	Gameloft	
The Amazing Spider-Man 2	2014	Spider-Man	Windows, Nintendo 3DS, PlayStation 3, PlayStation 4, Wii U, Xbox 360, Xbox One, iOS, Android	Activision	
Kellogg's The Amazing Spider-Man 2	2014	Spider-Man	Android, iOS, Windows Phone	Catapult Marketing, Bully! Entertainment, Kellogg Company	
Spider-Man Ultimate Power	2014	Spider-Man	Android, iOS, Windows Phone, BlackBerry	Gameloft	
Uncanny X-Men: Days of Future Past	2014	X-Men	Android, iOS	GlitchSoft	
Spider-Man Unlimited	2014	Spider-Man	Android, iOS, Windows Phone	Gameloft	
Disney Infinity 2.0	2014	crossover	Xbox One, Xbox 360, PlayStation 4, PlayStation 3, PlayStation Vita, Wii U, Windows	Disney Interactive Studios	
Guardians of the Galaxy: The Universal Weapon	2014	Guardians of the Galaxy	Android, iOS, Windows Phone	Disney Interactive Studios	
Marvel Disk Wars: The Avengers: Ultimate Heroes	2014	Avengers	Nintendo 3DS	Bandai Namco Entertainment	
Marvel Contest of Champions	2014	crossover	Android, iOS, Windows	Kabam	
Marvel: Future Fight	2015	crossover	Android, iOS	Netmarble Games	
Lego Marvel's Avengers	2016	crossover	Windows, Nintendo 3DS, OS X, PlayStation 3, PlayStation 4, PlayStation Vita, Wii U, Xbox 360, Xbox One	TT Games, Warner Bros. Interactive Entertainment	
Marvel Avengers Academy	2016	crossover	Android, iOS	TinyCo	
Kellogg's Marvel's Civil War VR	2016	crossover	Android, iOS	Bully! Entertainment, Kellogg Company	
Marvel Tsum Tsum	2016	crossover	Android, iOS	Xflag	
Marvel Heroes Omega	2017	crossover	PlayStation 4, Xbox One	Gazillion	
Guardians of the Galaxy: The Telltale Series	2017	Guardians of the Galaxy	Xbox One, PlayStation 4, Android, iOS, Windows, macOS	Telltale Games	
Spider-Man: Homecoming – Virtual Reality Experience	2017	Spider-Man	HTC Vive, Oculus Rift, PlayStation VR	CreateVR	
Marvel vs. Capcom: Infinite	2017	crossover	PlayStation 4, Windows, Xbox One	Capcom	
Lego Marvel Super Heroes 2	2017	crossover	PlayStation 4, Xbox One, Nintendo Switch, Windows	TT Games, Warner Bros. Interactive Entertainment, Feral Interactive	
Marvel Strike Force	2018	crossover	Android, iOS	FoxNext	
Marvel End Time Arena	2018	crossover	Windows	Smilegate Entertainment	
Marvel Battle Lines	2018	crossover	Android, iOS	Nexon	
Marvel's Spider-Man	2018	Spider-Man	PlayStation 4, PlayStation 5, Windows	Sony Interactive Entertainment	
Marvel Powers United VR	2018	crossover	Oculus Rift, Oculus Rift S	Oculus Studios	
Spider-Man: Far From Home Virtual Reality Experience	2019	Spider-Man	HTC Vive, Oculus Rift, PlayStation VR	CreateVR	
Marvel Ultimate Alliance 3: The Black Order	2019	crossover	Nintendo Switch	Nintendo	
Avengers: Damage Control	2019	crossover	N/A	Marvel Studios, ILMxLAB	
Marvel Super War	2019	crossover	Android, iOS	NetEase	

=== 2020s ===
Title	Date	Property	Platform(s)	Developer(s)	Publisher(s)	Ref
Marvel Duel	2020	crossover	Android, iOS	NetEase	NetEase	
Iron Man VR	2020	Iron Man	PlayStation 4 (PlayStation VR), Meta Quest 2	Camoflauj	Sony Interactive Entertainment	
Marvel's Avengers	2020	Avengers	PlayStation 4, Windows, Xbox One, Xbox Series X/S, PlayStation 5, Stadia	Crystal Dynamics	Square Enix	
Marvel Realm of Champions	2020	crossover	Android, iOS	Kabam	Kabam	
Marvel's Spider-Man: Miles Morales	2020	Spider-Man (Miles Morales)	PlayStation 4, PlayStation 5, Windows	Insomniac Games	Sony Interactive Entertainment	
Marvel Future Revolution	2021	crossover	Android, iOS	Netmarble Monster	Netmarble Games	
Marvel's Guardians of the Galaxy	2021	Guardians of the Galaxy	PlayStation 4, Windows, Xbox One, Xbox Series X/S, PlayStation 5, Nintendo Switch (Cloud Version), Nintendo Switch 2	Eidos-Montréal	Square Enix (Note: Self-published by Eidos-Montréal following their sale to Embracer Group by Square Enix in 2022.)	
Marvel Snap	2022	crossover	Android, iOS, Windows	Second Dinner	Nuverse	
Marvel's Midnight Suns	2022	Midnight Sons	Windows, PlayStation 4, PlayStation 5, Xbox One, Xbox Series X/S	Firaxis Games	2K Games	
Marvel's Spider-Man 2	2023	Spider-Man	PlayStation 5, Windows	Insomniac Games	Sony Interactive Entertainment	
Marvel vs. Capcom Fighting Collection: Arcade Classics	2024	crossover	Nintendo Switch, PlayStation 4, Windows, Xbox One	Capcom	Capcom	
Marvel Rivals	2024	crossover	PlayStation 5, PlayStation 4, Windows, Xbox Series X/S, Nintendo Switch 2	NetEase Games	NetEase Games	
Marvel Mystic Mayhem	2025	crossover	Android, iOS	NetEase Games	NetEase Games	
Marvel's Deadpool VR	2025	Deadpool	Meta Quest 3	Twisted Pixel Games	Oculus Studios	
Marvel Cosmic Invasion	2025	crossover	Nintendo Switch, Nintendo Switch 2, PlayStation 4, PlayStation 5, Windows, Linux, Xbox Series X/S	Tribute Games	Dotemu	
Marvel MaXimum Collection	2026	crossover	Nintendo Switch, PlayStation 5, Windows, Xbox Series X/S	Limited Run Games	Limited Run Games	
Marvel Tokon: Fighting Souls	2026	crossover	PlayStation 5, Windows	Arc System Works	Sony Interactive Entertainment	
Marvel's Wolverine	2026	Wolverine	PlayStation 5	Insomniac Games	Sony Interactive Entertainment	

=== Upcoming ===
Title	Date	Property	Platform(s)	Developer(s)	Publisher(s)	Ref
Marvel's Blade	2027	Blade	TBA	Arkane Lyon	Bethesda Softworks	
Marvel's Iron Man	TBA	Iron Man	TBA	Motive Studio	Electronic Arts	
Marvel 1943: Rise of Hydra (Note: When delayed past Early 2026, all Skydance stated was "Beyond Early 2026" with no more info or release window given. For ease of reference, the release date will remain listed as TBA until a new window is announced.)	TBA	Captain America, Black Panther	TBA	Paramount Games Studio	Plaion	

== See also ==
- List of video games featuring Spider-Man
- List of video games featuring the Hulk
- List of video games featuring the Punisher
- List of video games featuring the X-Men
- Marvel vs. Capcom
- List of video games based on DC Comics
- List of video games based on comics
