= Cyclops in other media =

Appearances of Cyclops in cinema, television and video games

Adaptations of Cyclops in other media
- Original source: Comics published by Marvel Comics
- First appearance: X-Men #1 (September 1963)

Films and television
- Film(s): X-Men (2000); X2 (2003); X-Men: The Last Stand (2006); X-Men Origins: Wolverine (2009); X-Men: Days of Future Past (2014); X-Men: Apocalypse (2016); Dark Phoenix (2019); Avengers: Doomsday (2026)
- Television show(s): X-Men: The Animated Series (1992); X-Men: Evolution (2000); Wolverine and the X-Men (2008); Marvel Anime: Wolverine (2011); Marvel Anime: X-Men (2011); X-Men '97 (2024)

Games
- Video game(s): The Uncanny X-Men (1989); X-Men (1992); X-Men Legends (2004)

The Marvel Comics character Cyclops has appeared in various other media since his debut in The X-Men #1.

== Television ==
Jean Grey and Scott Summers as depicted in Wolverine and the X-Men.

- Cyclops appears in the "Sub-Mariner" segment of The Marvel Super Heroes, voiced by Len Birman. This version is a member of the Allies for Peace.
- Cyclops appears in Spider-Man and His Amazing Friends episodes "The X-Men Adventure" and "A Firestar is Born", voiced by George DiCenzo in the former and Neil Ross in the latter.
- Cyclops appears in X-Men: Pryde of the X-Men, voiced by Michael Bell.
- Cyclops appears in X-Men: The Animated Series, voiced by Norm Spencer. This version does not display a explicit connection to Havok and is initially unaware of his father Corsair.
  - Cyclops appears in X-Men '97, voiced by Ray Chase.
- Cyclops appears in the Spider-Man: The Animated Series consecutive episodes "The Mutant Agenda" and "Mutant's Revenge", voiced again by Norm Spencer.
- Cyclops makes a cameo appearance in the Fantastic Four episode "Nightmare in Green".
- Cyclops appears in X-Men: Evolution, voiced by Kirby Morrow. This version is a confident, self-assured, extroverted teenager and student of Bayville High School in addition to Xavier's School for Gifted Youngsters who displays a close brotherly relationship with teammate Nightcrawler and eventually enters a relationship with longtime friend Jean Grey. After graduating from Bayville High, Cyclops becomes an instructor at Xavier's School.
- Cyclops appears in Wolverine and the X-Men, voiced by Nolan North as an adult, and Benjamin Bryan as a child. This version was originally a member of the X-Men until the group disbanded after Professor X and Jean Grey disappeared under mysterious circumstances. As the latter helped him become more experienced and coordinated with his abilities, Cyclops became a brooding loner and initially refuses Wolverine's efforts to re-recruit him into the X-Men in favor of obsessively searching for Grey. Eventually, Cyclops reluctantly rejoins the group and enters a relationship with Emma Frost before rescuing Grey.
- Cyclops appears in The Super Hero Squad Show episode "Mysterious Mayhem at Mutant High!", voiced by Carlos Alazraqui. This version's appearance resembles that of his X-Men: The Animated Series incarnation.
- Cyclops appears in the Black Panther episode "Black Panther vs. Juggernaut and Black Knight", voiced again by Nolan North.
- Cyclops makes a cameo appearance in Marvel Anime: Wolverine, voiced by Toshiyuki Morikawa in Japanese and by Scott Porter in English.
- Cyclops appears in Marvel Anime: X-Men, again voiced by Toshiyuki Morikawa in Japanese and by Scott Porter in English.
- Cyclops makes a non-speaking cameo appearance in The Avengers: Earth's Mightiest Heroes episode "Infiltration" via a photograph.
- Cyclops appears in Marvel Disk Wars: The Avengers, voiced by Takahiro Yoshimizu in Japanese and Steve Staley in English. This version was trapped inside a DISK (Digital Identity Securement Kit) that Wolverine took possession of.

== Film ==
Scott Summers / Cyclops as portrayed by James Marsden in X-Men: The Last Stand (left) and Tye Sheridan in X-Men: Apocalypse (right).

=== 20th Century Fox films ===
Scott Summers / Cyclops appears in the X-Men film series produced by 20th Century Fox.

- He first appears in X-Men (2000), X2 (2003), and X-Men: The Last Stand (2006), portrayed by James Marsden. All throughout, he serves as a field leader for the X-Men until he is killed by the Phoenix.
- A young Summers makes a minor appearance in X-Men Origins: Wolverine, portrayed by Tim Pocock. For this appearance, his optic blasts can generate heat in addition to concussive force.
- Summers makes a cameo appearance in X-Men: Days of Future Past (2014), portrayed again by James Marsden. Wolverine went back in time and changed the past, resulting in Cyclops being alive again.
- A separate depiction of a young Summers appears in X-Men: Apocalypse (2016), Deadpool 2 (2018), and Dark Phoenix (2019), portrayed by Tye Sheridan. This version is the younger brother of Alex Summers / Havok.
- Summers appears on a comic book cover depicted in Logan (2017), illustrated by Dan Panosian.

=== Marvel Cinematic Universe ===
Scott Summers / Cyclops will appear in the Marvel Cinematic Universe.

- An alternate variant of Summers is mentioned in Deadpool & Wolverine (2024), as being part of an X-Men team and an ally to that world's Wolverine before being killed as part of an anti-mutant hate campaign by humans.
- An alternate version of Summers will appear in Avengers: Doomsday (2026), portrayed again by James Marsden.
- The native MCU incarnation of Summers will appear in the untitled X-Men film (2028), and will be portrayed by Kit Connor.

== Video games ==
- Cyclops appears as a playable character in X-Men: Madness in Murderworld (1989).
- Cyclops appears as a playable character in The Uncanny X-Men (1989).
- Cyclops appears as a playable character in X-Men II: The Fall of the Mutants (1990).
- Cyclops appears as a playable character in X-Men (1992).
- Cyclops appears as a playable character in Spider-Man/X-Men: Arcade's Revenge (1992).
- Cyclops appears as an unlockable playable character in X-Men (1993).
- Cyclops appears as an unlockable playable character in X-Men 2: Clone Wars (1994).
- Cyclops appears as a playable character in X-Men: Children of the Atom (1994), voiced by Norm Spencer.
- Cyclops appears as a playable character in X-Men: Mutant Apocalypse (1995).
- Cyclops appears as an unlockable playable character in X-Men: Gamesmaster's Legacy (1995).
- Cyclops appears as a playable character in X-Men vs. Street Fighter (1996), voiced again by Norm Spencer.
- Cyclops appears as an unlockable playable character in X-Men: Mojo World (1996).
- Cyclops appears as a playable character in Marvel Super Heroes vs. Street Fighter (1997), voiced again by Norm Spencer..
- Cyclops appears as a non-playable assist character in Marvel vs. Capcom: Clash of Super Heroes (1998).
- Cyclops appears as a playable character in Marvel vs. Capcom 2: New Age of Heroes (2000), voiced again by Norm Spencer..
- Cyclops appears as a playable character in X-Men: Mutant Academy (2000).
- Cyclops appears as a playable character in X-Men: Mutant Wars (2000).
- Cyclops appears as a playable character in X-Men: Reign of Apocalypse (2001).
- Cyclops appears as a playable character in X-Men: Mutant Academy 2 (2001), voiced by Ray Landry.
- Cyclops appears as a playable character in X-Men: Next Dimension (2002), voiced by Tim Harrison.
- Cyclops appears as a playable character in X-Men Legends (2004), voiced by Robin Atkin Downes.
- Cyclops appears as a playable character in X-Men Legends II: Rise of Apocalypse (2005), voiced by Josh Keaton.
- Cyclops appears as a character in Marvel: Ultimate Alliance (2006). Additionally, a brainwashed thrall of Cyclops, referred to as "Dark Cyclops", under Doctor Doom's control appears as well, voiced by Robin Atkin Downes. Furthermore, he appears as a downloadable playable character in the Xbox 360 and 2016 re-release versions of the game, voiced by Scott MacDonald.
- Cyclops, based on James Marsden's portrayal, appears in X-Men: The Official Game (2006), voiced by James Arnold Taylor.
- Cyclops appears as a playable character in the PS2, PSP, and Wii versions of Marvel: Ultimate Alliance 2 (2009), voiced by Zach Hanks.
- Cyclops appears in the Pinball FX 2 (2010) X-Men table, voiced by Travis Willingham.
- Cyclops makes a background cameo appearance in Ultimate Marvel vs Capcom 3 (2011) via a poster.
- Cyclops appears as a playable character in Marvel Super Hero Squad Online (2011).
- Cyclops appears in X-Men: Destiny (2011), voiced again by Nolan North.
- Cyclops appears as a playable character in Marvel Avengers Alliance (2012).
- Cyclops appears as a playable character in Marvel Heroes (2013), voiced again by Scott Porter.
- Cyclops appears as a playable character in Marvel Puzzle Quest (2013).
- Cyclops appears as a playable character in Lego Marvel Super Heroes (2013), voiced again by Nolan North.
- Cyclops appears as a playable character in Marvel Avengers Alliance Tactics (2014).
- Cyclops appears as a playable character in Marvel Contest of Champions (2014).
- Cyclops appears as a playable character in Marvel: Future Fight (2015).
- Cyclops appears as an unlockable playable character in Marvel Ultimate Alliance 3: The Black Order (2019), voiced again by Scott Porter.
- Cyclops appears in Marvel Snap (2022) voiced by Matthew Curtis.
- Cyclops appears as a playable character in Marvel Rivals (2024), voiced again by Ray Chase in English.
- Cyclops appears as a playable character in DLC for Marvel Cosmic Invasion (2025), voiced again by Ray Chase
- Phoenix Cyclops, in his Dark Phoenix version, was added as a playable character in DLC for Marvel Tokon: Fighting Souls, voiced again by Ray Chase in English and Toshiyuki Morikawa in Japanese, with normal Cyclops, donning his iconic 90s look as his cosmetic alternate costume.

== Miscellaneous ==
- Cyclops appears in the Astonishing X-Men motion comic, voiced initially by Greg Abbey and later by Mark Hildreth.
- Cyclops appears in the Wolverine versus Sabretooth motion comic, voiced by Trevor Devall.
- Cyclops appears in the Wolverine: Weapon X motion comic, voiced again by Trevor Devall.
- Cyclops appears in the novel X-Men: Shadows of the Past, by Michael Jan Friedman.
- Cyclops appears in the novel X-Men: The Chaos Engine Trilogy, by Steven A. Roman. This version is a member of a detachment of X-Men who were inside the Starlight Citadel when Doctor Doom, Magneto, and the Red Skull obtained a flawed Cosmic Cube and separately rewrite reality to their liking. Due to the citadel protecting them during Doom's changes, the X-Men work to restore their original reality. However, Cyclops becomes one of Magneto and the Red Skull's followers amidst their changes until Jean Grey restores him, allowing Cyclops to help the X-Men foil Doom's plot to seize the citadel and defeat the Red Skull.

== See also ==
- X-Men in other media
