= List of video games featuring the X-Men =

List of video games based on the Marvel Comics superhero team

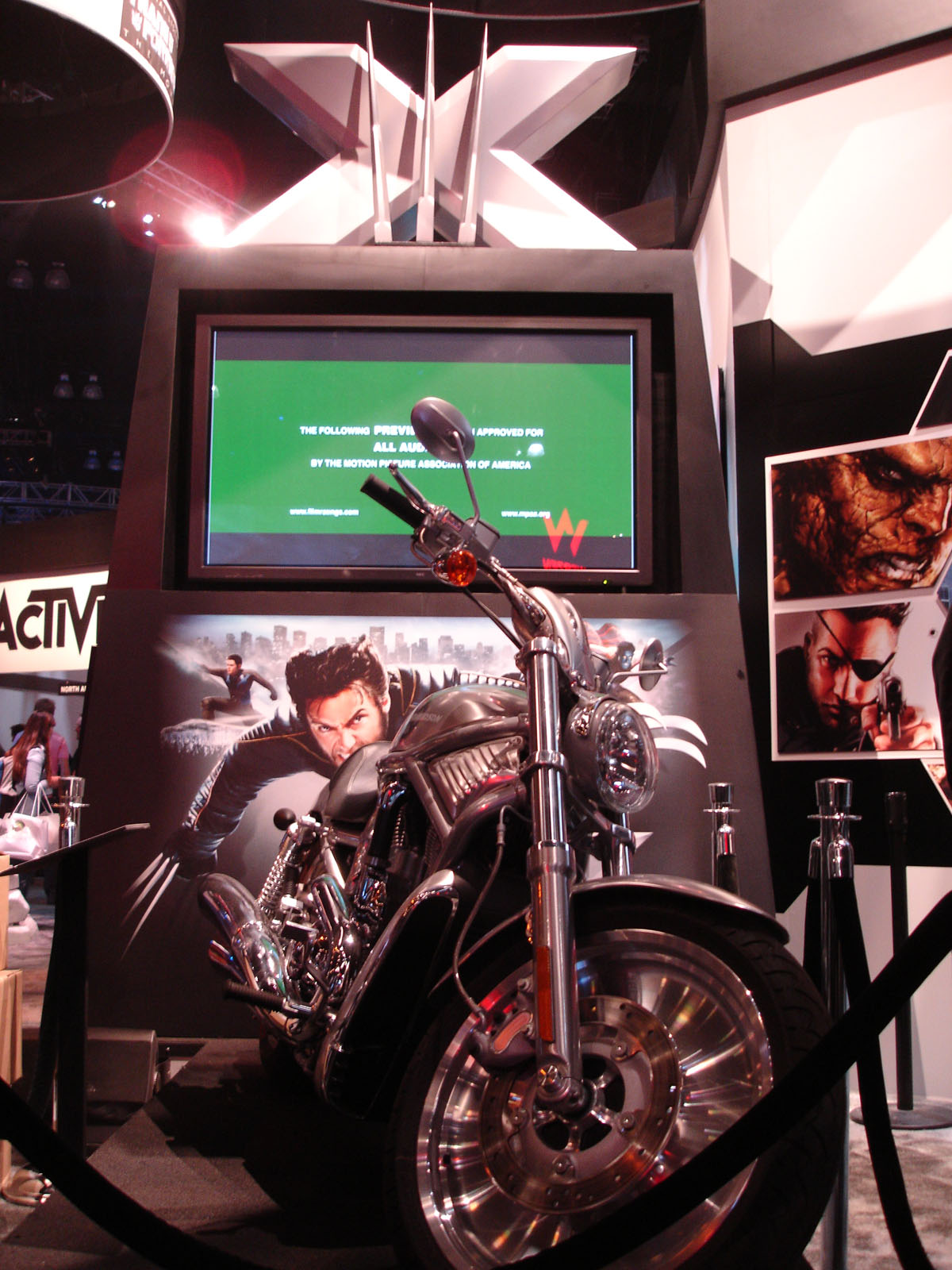
An X-Men booth at the 2006 Electronic Entertainment Expo, promoting X-Men: The Official Game

The X-Men are a superhero team in Marvel Comics' Marvel Universe. The group debuted in 1963 in an eponymous comic book series. Beginning in 1989, the characters appeared in video game adaptations for home consoles, handheld game consoles, arcades, and personal computers.

An earlier game was planned for home computers in 1985, but the developer went out of business before its launch. The first games were released on 8-bit home platforms, and the series expanded onto handheld consoles and arcades in the early 1990s. Most X-Men games, especially those released in the 2000s, were released on several platforms. Several companies have developed entries in the franchise, including Paragon Software, Software Creations, Konami, and Capcom. The titles are action games that pit the X-Men against Marvel supervillains, typically taking the form of beat 'em up and fighting games. Each game features different groupings of X-Men heroes and villains, and typically allows players to control multiple characters.

One X-Men character, Wolverine, has starred in several eponymous action games; the first game was the 1990 Wolverine. X-Men characters also frequently appear in Marvel games that focus on several of its comic book franchises, including Marvel vs. Capcom: Clash of Super Heroes and Marvel: Ultimate Alliance. The franchise holds several Guinness World Records, including most games based on a superhero group, first tag-team fighting game, first superhero first-person shooter, and most simultaneous players on an arcade game.

== X-Men games ==
Game	Details
The Uncanny X-Men Original release date(s): NA: December 1989	Release years by system: 1989 – Nintendo Entertainment System
The Uncanny X-Men Original release date(s): NA: December 1989	Notes: Action video game that was developed by an undisclosed external developer (though it has been speculated to have been developed by Pixel) and published by LJN; Features Colossus, Cyclops, Iceman, Nightcrawler, Storm, and Wolverine
X-Men: Madness in Murderworld Original release date(s): NA: 1989; EU: 1989	Release years by system: 1989 – Commodore 64, PC
X-Men: Madness in Murderworld Original release date(s): NA: 1989; EU: 1989	Notes: Action computer game developed and published by Paragon Software
X-Men II: The Fall of the Mutants Original release date(s): NA: January 1990	Release years by system: 1990 – PC
X-Men II: The Fall of the Mutants Original release date(s): NA: January 1990	Notes: Action-adventure computer game developed by Paragon Software
X-Men Original release date(s): 1992	Release years by system: 1992 – Arcade; 2010 – PlayStation 3, Xbox 360; 2011 – iOS; 2011 – Android
X-Men Original release date(s): 1992	Notes: Side-scrolling beat'em up developed by Konami; Features Colossus, Cyclops, Dazzler, Nightcrawler, Storm, and Wolverine against several X-Men villains; Multiplayer game released in two versions: four-player and six-player; Holds a Guinness World Record for the most simultaneous players on an arcade game; Uses a two monitor display; Release on PlayStation 3 and Xbox 360 consoles via the PlayStation Network and Xbox Live Arcade, respectively
Spider-Man/X-Men: Arcade's Revenge Original release date(s): NA: November 1992; EU: August 19, 1993	Release years by system: 1992 – Genesis, Super NES; 1993 – Game Boy; 1994 – Game Gear
Spider-Man/X-Men: Arcade's Revenge Original release date(s): NA: November 1992; EU: August 19, 1993	Notes: Action game developed by Software Creations; Game Boy version developed by Unexpected Development; Crossover game that features Cyclops, Gambit, Spider-Man, Storm, and Wolverine
X-Men Original release date(s): NA: 1993; JP: 1993	Release years by system: 1993 – Genesis
X-Men Original release date(s): NA: 1993; JP: 1993	Notes: Action game developed by Sega
X-Men Original release date(s): NA: January 1994	Release years by system: 1994 – Game Gear
X-Men: Mutant Apocalypse Original release date(s): NA: November 1994; JP: January 3, 1995	Release years by system: 1994 – Super NES
X-Men: Mutant Apocalypse Original release date(s): NA: November 1994; JP: January 3, 1995	Notes: Action platform game developed by Capcom; Centers on the X-Men's conflict with Genosha; Features Beast, Cyclops, Gambit, Psylocke, and Wolverine.
X-Men: Children of the Atom Original release date(s): NA: 1994; JP: December 1994	Release years by system: 1994 – Arcade, PC, PlayStation, Sega Saturn
X-Men: Children of the Atom Original release date(s): NA: 1994; JP: December 1994	Notes: Arcade fighting game developed by Capcom; Home console versions were published by Acclaim Entertainment; Features several heroes and villains from the X-Men series; One of the highest-rated X-Men games
X-Men 2: Game Master's Legacy Original release date(s): NA: 1995; EU: 1995	Release years by system: 1995 – Game Gear
X-Men 2: Game Master's Legacy Original release date(s): NA: 1995; EU: 1995	Notes: Action game developed by Sega; Features Bishop, Cyclops, Gambit, Jean Grey, Rogue, Storm, and Wolverine
X-Men 2: Clone Wars Original release date(s): NA: 1995; EU: 1995	Release years by system: 1995 – Genesis
X-Men 2: Clone Wars Original release date(s): NA: 1995; EU: 1995	Notes: Sequel to Sega's 1993 Genesis title; Features Beast, Cyclops, Gambit, Magneto, Nightcrawler, Psylocke, and Wolverine
X-Men vs. Street Fighter Original release date(s): JP: September 1996; NA: 1996	Release years by system: 1996 – Arcade, Sega Saturn, PlayStation
X-Men vs. Street Fighter Original release date(s): JP: September 1996; NA: 1996	Notes: Arcade fighting game developed by Capcom; Features heroes and villains from the X-Men comics; Includes a software bug that allows players to execute attack combos indefinitely; Holds a Guinness World Record as the first fighting game to feature tag-team fighting
X-Men 3: Mojo World Original release date(s): NA: 1996	Release years by system: 1996 – Game Gear, Master System
X-Men 3: Mojo World Original release date(s): NA: 1996	Notes: Action game developed by Sega; Features Cyclops, Gambit, Havok, Rogue, Shard, and Wolverine
X-Men: The Ravages of Apocalypse Original release date(s): NA: November 30, 1997	Release years by system: 1997 – PC
X-Men: The Ravages of Apocalypse Original release date(s): NA: November 30, 1997	Notes: Commercial total conversion of the Quake engine; Developed by Zero Gravity and published by WizardWorks; Holds a Guinness World Record as the first superhero first-person shooter
X-Men: Mutant Academy Original release date(s): NA: July 11, 2000; JP: April 12, 2001; EU: August 18, 2000	Release years by system: 2000 – Game Boy Color, PlayStation
X-Men: Mutant Academy Original release date(s): NA: July 11, 2000; JP: April 12, 2001; EU: August 18, 2000	Notes: Fighting game that features X-Men heroes and villains; Published by Activision and developed by Paradox Development (PlayStation) and Crawfish Int. (Game Boy Color)
X-Men: Mutant Wars Original release date(s): NA: November 2000; EU: November 17, 2000	Release years by system: 2000 – Game Boy Color
X-Men: Mutant Wars Original release date(s): NA: November 2000; EU: November 17, 2000	Notes: Side-scrolling beat'em up developed by Avit and published by Activision; Features Cyclops, Gambit, Iceman, Storm, and Wolverine
X-Men: Mutant Academy 2 Original release date(s): NA: September 17, 2001; EU: September 21, 2001; JP: March 6, 2003	Release years by system: 2001 – PlayStation
X-Men: Mutant Academy 2 Original release date(s): NA: September 17, 2001; EU: September 21, 2001; JP: March 6, 2003	Notes: Developed by Paradox Development and published by Activision; Fighting game that features X-Men heroes and villains
X-Men: Reign of Apocalypse Original release date(s): NA: September 26, 2001; EU: October 5, 2001	Release years by system: 2001 – Game Boy Advance
X-Men: Reign of Apocalypse Original release date(s): NA: September 26, 2001; EU: October 5, 2001	Notes: Side-scrolling beat-em up developed by Digital Eclipse and published by Activision; Features Cyclops, Storm, Wolverine, and Rogue
X-Men: Next Dimension Original release date(s): NA: October 15, 2002; PAL: November 22, 2002	Release years by system: 2002 – GameCube, PlayStation 2, Xbox
X-Men: Next Dimension Original release date(s): NA: October 15, 2002; PAL: November 22, 2002	Notes: Developed by Paradox Development and published by Activision; Fighting game that features X-Men heroes and villains; Sequel to the Mutant Academy games
X-Men Legends Original release date(s): NA: September 21, 2004; PAL: October 22, 2004	Release years by system: 2004 – GameCube, PlayStation 2, Xbox; 2005 – N-Gage
X-Men Legends Original release date(s): NA: September 21, 2004; PAL: October 22, 2004	Notes: Action role-playing game developed by Raven Software and published by Activision; Features many X-Men characters in a co-operative gameplay format
X-Men Legends II: Rise of Apocalypse Original release date(s): NA: September 20, 2005; PAL: October 7, 2005	Release years by system: 2005 – GameCube, Mobile phone, N-Gage, PC, PlayStation 2, PlayStation Portable, Xbox
X-Men Legends II: Rise of Apocalypse Original release date(s): NA: September 20, 2005; PAL: October 7, 2005	Notes: Sequel to X-Men Legends; Action role-playing game developed by Raven Software and published by Activision; Features many X-Men characters in a co-operative gameplay format
X-Men: The Official Game Original release date(s): NA: May 16, 2006; PAL: May 19, 2006	Release years by system: 2006 – GameCube, Game Boy Advance, Nintendo DS, PC, PlayStation 2, Xbox, Xbox 360
X-Men: The Official Game Original release date(s): NA: May 16, 2006; PAL: May 19, 2006	Notes: Action game published by Activision; Features Wolverine, Iceman, and Nightcrawler; Tie-in game with the 2006 film X-Men: The Last Stand
X-Men: Destiny Original release date(s): NA: September 27, 2011; EU: September 30, 2011	Release years by system: 2011 – Nintendo DS, PlayStation 3, Wii, Xbox 360
X-Men: Destiny Original release date(s): NA: September 27, 2011; EU: September 30, 2011	Notes: Action game developed by Silicon Knights and published by Activision; Writer Mike Carey wrote the story
Uncanny X-Men: The Days of Future Past Original release date(s): NA: May 22, 2014; EU: May 22, 2014	Release years by system: 2014 – iOS and Android touch / mobile devices
Uncanny X-Men: The Days of Future Past Original release date(s): NA: May 22, 2014; EU: May 22, 2014	Notes: Action platformer mobile game published and created by Glitchsoft in partnership with Marvel; Features Wolverine, Kitty Pryde, Scarlet Witch, Colossus, Cyclops, Storm, and Polaris.; Based on 1981 "Days of Future Past" comic book story arc.
Marvel's X-Men Proposed release date(s): NA: 2030	Proposed system release: 2030 – PlayStation 5
Marvel's X-Men Proposed release date(s): NA: 2030	Notes: The release date of 2030 is from a leaked internal presentation that features a roadmap of all titles to be released by Insomniac Games until 2032.

== Wolverine games ==
Game	Details
Wolverine Original release date(s): NA: October 1991	Release years by system: 1991 – Nintendo Entertainment System
Wolverine Original release date(s): NA: October 1991	Notes: Action video game developed by Software Creations and published by LJN; A side-scrolling platform game
Wolverine: Adamantium Rage Original release date(s): NA: 1994; EU: 1994; JP: January 27, 1995	Release years by system: 1994 – Genesis, Super NES
Wolverine: Adamantium Rage Original release date(s): NA: 1994; EU: 1994; JP: January 27, 1995	Notes: Action game that features a recharging health game mechanic, one of the first to do so, modeled after the character's special powers in comic books.; The Genesis version was published by Acclaim and developed by Teeny Weeny Games; Super NES version was published by LJN and developed by Bits Studios.
X-Men: Wolverine's Rage Original release date(s): NA: May 15, 2001; EU: June 15, 2001	Release years by system: 2001 – Game Boy Color
X-Men: Wolverine's Rage Original release date(s): NA: May 15, 2001; EU: June 15, 2001	Notes: Side scrolling beat'em up developed by Digital Eclipse
X2: Wolverine's Revenge Original release date(s): NA: April 15, 2003; PAL: April 17, 2003; JP: July 22, 2004	Release years by system: 2003 – GameCube, Game Boy Advance, Mac, PC, PlayStation 2, Xbox
X2: Wolverine's Revenge Original release date(s): NA: April 15, 2003; PAL: April 17, 2003; JP: July 22, 2004	Notes: Action game developed by GenePool and published by Activision; Spin-off based on the plot of the film X2: X-Men United; Mac version was ported by Aspyr Media; PC version was ported by LTI Gray Matter
X-Men Origins: Wolverine Original release date(s): NA: May 1, 2009; EU: May 1, 2009; AU: April 29, 2009	Release years by system: 2009 – Nintendo DS, PC, PlayStation 2, PlayStation 3, PlayStation Portable, Wii, Xbox 360
X-Men Origins: Wolverine Original release date(s): NA: May 1, 2009; EU: May 1, 2009; AU: April 29, 2009	Notes: Action game published by Activision Blizzard; Tie-in game with the 2009 film X-Men Origins: Wolverine
Marvel's Wolverine Original release date(s): NA: September 15, 2026; EU: September 15, 2026; AU: September 15, 2026	Release years by system: 2026 – PlayStation 5
Marvel's Wolverine Original release date(s): NA: September 15, 2026; EU: September 15, 2026; AU: September 15, 2026	Notes: Action game developed by Insomniac Games and published by Sony Interactive Entertainment; Shares continuity with the Marvel's Spider-Man franchise

== Cancelled games ==
Game	Details
Questprobe featuring The X-Men Original release date(s):	Release years by system: 8-bit home computers
Questprobe featuring The X-Men Original release date(s):	Notes: Part of Adventure International's Questprobe series of graphic adventure games; Cancelled when Adventure International went out of business in 1985
X-Women Original release date(s):	Release years by system: Genesis
X-Women Original release date(s):	Notes: Follow up action game to Sega's 1995 Genesis title X-Men 2: Clone Wars; Story would have focused on the female members of the X-Men; Cancelled prior to completion
X-Men: Mind Games Original release date(s):	Release years by system: Sega 32X
X-Men: Mind Games Original release date(s):	Notes: 3D action game set to be released for the short lived Sega 32X; Development was by Scavenger and set to be published by SEGA; An early prototype was released in 2009 where the player can only control Bishop; Cancelled probably dues to poor sales of the Sega 32X

== Related games ==
Game	Details
Marvel Super Heroes Original release date(s): NA: October 24, 1995; JP: November 1995	Release years by system: 1995 – Arcade; 1997 – PlayStation, Sega Saturn
Marvel Super Heroes Original release date(s): NA: October 24, 1995; JP: November 1995	Notes: Fighting game developed by Capcom; Features Psylocke and Wolverine as well as two X-Men villains: Juggernaut and Magneto
Marvel Super Heroes: War of the Gems Original release date(s): NA: November 1996; JP: October 18, 1996; EU: 1996	Release years by system: 1996 – Super NES
Marvel Super Heroes: War of the Gems Original release date(s): NA: November 1996; JP: October 18, 1996; EU: 1996	Notes: Developed and published by Capcom; Side-scrolling action game based on Marvel Comics' mini-series The Infinity Gauntlet; Features Wolverine along with other Marvel characters
Marvel Super Heroes vs. Street Fighter Original release date(s): JP: July 1997; NA: 1997; EU: 1999	Release years by system: 1997 – Arcade; 1998 – Sega Saturn; 1999 – PlayStation
Marvel Super Heroes vs. Street Fighter Original release date(s): JP: July 1997; NA: 1997; EU: 1999	Notes: Fighting game developed by Capcom; Features Cyclops and Wolverine along with other Marvel characters; Sega Saturn version was released exclusively in Japan and is compatible with a RAM expansion cartridge
Marvel vs. Capcom: Clash of Super Heroes Original release date(s): JP: February 1998; NA: January 23, 1998	Release years by system: 1998 – Arcade; 1999 – Dreamcast, PlayStation
Marvel vs. Capcom: Clash of Super Heroes Original release date(s): JP: February 1998; NA: January 23, 1998	Notes: Fighting game developed by Capcom; Features several X-Men characters
Marvel vs. Capcom 2: New Age of Heroes Original release date(s): JP: March 30, 2000; NA: June 29, 2000; EU: July 16, 2000	Release years by system: 2000 – Arcade, Dreamcast; 2002 – PlayStation 2, Xbox; 2009 – PlayStation 3, Xbox 360
Marvel vs. Capcom 2: New Age of Heroes Original release date(s): JP: March 30, 2000; NA: June 29, 2000; EU: July 16, 2000	Notes: Fighting game developed by Capcom; Holds a Guinness World Record as the first game to feature three-on-three tag-team fighting; Features several X-Men characters
Marvel Nemesis: Rise of the Imperfects Original release date(s): NA: September 20, 2005; EU: October 14, 2005	Release years by system: 2005 – GameCube, Nintendo DS, PlayStation 2, PlayStation Portable, Xbox
Marvel Nemesis: Rise of the Imperfects Original release date(s): NA: September 20, 2005; EU: October 14, 2005	Notes: Fighting game published by Electronic Arts; Features Storm and Wolverine
Marvel: Ultimate Alliance Original release date(s): NA: October 24, 2006; EU: October 27, 2006; AU: November 1, 2006	Release years by system: 2006 – Game Boy Advance, PC, PlayStation 2, PlayStation 3, PlayStation Portable, Wii, Xbox, Xbox 360
Marvel: Ultimate Alliance Original release date(s): NA: October 24, 2006; EU: October 27, 2006; AU: November 1, 2006	Notes: Action role-playing game published by Activision; Features several X-Men characters in a co-operative gameplay format
Marvel: Ultimate Alliance 2 Original release date(s): NA: September 15, 2009; EU: September 25, 2009; AU: September 16, 2009	Release years by system: 2009 – Nintendo DS, PlayStation 2, PlayStation 3, PlayStation Portable, Wii, Xbox 360
Marvel: Ultimate Alliance 2 Original release date(s): NA: September 15, 2009; EU: September 25, 2009; AU: September 16, 2009	Notes: Sequel to Marvel: Ultimate Alliance; Features several X-Men characters in a co-operative gameplay format; Based on the Civil War crossover storyline
Marvel Super Hero Squad Original release date(s): NA: October 20, 2009; EU: October 23, 2009; AU: October 21, 2009	Release years by system: 2009 – Nintendo DS, PlayStation 2, PlayStation Portable, Wii
Marvel Super Hero Squad Original release date(s): NA: October 20, 2009; EU: October 23, 2009; AU: October 21, 2009	Notes: Adventure game published by THQ as part of an exclusive deal with Marvel; Based on the Marvel Super Hero Squad franchise
Marvel Super Hero Squad: The Infinity Gauntlet Original release date(s): NA: November 16, 2010; AU: November 2010	Release years by system: 2010 – Nintendo DS, PlayStation 3, Wii, Xbox 360
Marvel Super Hero Squad: The Infinity Gauntlet Original release date(s): NA: November 16, 2010; AU: November 2010	Notes: Sequel to Marvel Super Hero Squad; Based on the second season of The Super Hero Squad Show
Marvel vs. Capcom 3: Fate of Two Worlds Original release date(s): NA: February 15, 2011; JP: February 17, 2011; EU: February 18, 2011	Release years by system: 2011 – PlayStation 3, Xbox 360
Marvel vs. Capcom 3: Fate of Two Worlds Original release date(s): NA: February 15, 2011; JP: February 17, 2011; EU: February 18, 2011	Notes: Fighting game developed by Capcom; Began development in 2008 when Capcom re-acquired the Marvel license after a period of legal issues that placed the series on hiatus
Marvel Super Hero Squad: Comic Combat Original release date(s): NA: November 15, 2011; AU: November 17, 2011; EU: November 18, 2011	Release years by system: 2011 – PlayStation 3, Wii, Xbox 360
Marvel Super Hero Squad: Comic Combat Original release date(s): NA: November 15, 2011; AU: November 17, 2011; EU: November 18, 2011	Notes: Sequel to Marvel Super Hero Squad: The Infinity Gauntlet; Requires uDraw
Marvel Heroes Original release date(s): NA: June 4, 2013	Release years by system: 2013 - PC
Marvel Heroes Original release date(s): NA: June 4, 2013	Notes: Free-to-play Massively multiplayer online game Action role-playing game; Wolverine is unlocked either using real money or in-game collected currency.; Other X-Men characters include: Cyclops, Jean Grey, Storm, Gambit, Nightcrawler, Deadpool, Psylocke, Cable, Kitty Pryde and Emma Frost.
Lego Marvel Super Heroes Original release date(s): NA: October 22, 2013; AU: November 13, 2013; EU: November 15, 2013	Release years by system: 2013 - PC, PlayStation 3, PlayStation 4, PlayStation Vita, Wii U, Xbox 360, Xbox One, Nintendo 3DS
Lego Marvel Super Heroes Original release date(s): NA: October 22, 2013; AU: November 13, 2013; EU: November 15, 2013	Notes: Lego adaptation of the Marvel universe and includes fully playable renditions of many of the X-Men.
Marvel Ultimate Alliance 3: The Black Order Original release date(s): WW: July 19, 2019	Release years by system: 2019 - Nintendo Switch
Marvel Ultimate Alliance 3: The Black Order Original release date(s): WW: July 19, 2019	Notes: A third Marvel Ultimate Alliance installment and a reboot to the series, developed by Koei Tecmo's Team Ninja, and both funded and exclusively published by Nintendo.; Amongst the playable X-Men cast consists of Wolverine, Nightcrawler, Psylocke, Deadpool, Magneto and Storm in the base roster, while Cyclops, Colossus, Iceman, Cable, Gambit, Jean Grey (as Phoenix) as downloadable characters.; The Sentinels, Juggernaut and Mystique are non-playable characters, while few X-Men cast like Hellfire Club are mentioned.
Marvel's Midnight Suns Original release date(s): NA: December 2nd, 2022	Release years by system: 2022 - Steam, Playstation 5, Windows, Xbox Series X/S; 2023 - Playstation 4, Xbox One
Marvel's Midnight Suns Original release date(s): NA: December 2nd, 2022	Notes: Tactical role-playing game with turn based combat.; X-Men included are: Wolverine, Magik, Storm, and Deadpool.
Marvel Rivals Original release date(s): NA: December 6, 2024	Release years by system: 2024 - Steam, Playstation 5, Xbox Series X/S
Marvel Rivals Original release date(s): NA: December 6, 2024	Notes: Hero shooter; X-Men included are: Wolverine, Storm, Magik, Magneto, Psylocke, Emma Frost, Phoenix (Jean Grey), Gambit, Rogue, Deadpool, Cyclops, and Jubilee
Marvel Tōkon: Fighting Souls Original release date(s): WW: August 6, 2026	Release years by system: 2026 – Steam, Playstation 5
Marvel Tōkon: Fighting Souls Original release date(s): WW: August 6, 2026	Notes: Fighting game developed by Arc System Works; Features the Unbreakable X-Men team, consisting of Storm, Wolverine, Magik, and Danger. Magneto, Deadpool, Phoenix Cyclops and Jubilee are also featured across various teams.
