= Apocalypse in other media =

Appearances of Apocalypse in cinema, television and video games

Adaptations of Apocalypse in other media
- Original source: Comics published by Marvel Comics
- First appearance: X-Factor vol. 1, #5 (June 1986)

Films and television
- Film(s): X-Men: Days of Future Past (2014); X-Men: Apocalypse (2016)
- Television show(s): X-Men: The Animated Series (1992); X-Men: Evolution (2000); Wolverine and the X-Men (2009); X-Men '97 (2024)

Games
- Video game(s): X-Men (1993); X-Men: Mutant Apocalypse (1994); X-Men: Reign of Apocalypse (2001); X-Men Legends II: Rise of Apocalypse (2005)

Originally an archenemy of the X-Men in Marvel comic books, the supervillain Apocalypse has appeared in various other forms of media, including animated television series, live-action films, and video games, while merchandise of the character includes toys and trading cards.

== Television ==
Apocalypse as he appears in X-Men: The Animated Series.

Apocalypse as a god-like pharaoh (left) and as a cybernetic being (right), as he appears in X-Men: Evolution.
- Apocalypse appears in X-Men: The Animated Series, voiced by John Colicos in the first two seasons, James Blendick in seasons three and four, and Lorne Kennedy in "The Fifth Horseman". This version is an immortal and invincible megalomaniac who seeks to purge the world of humanity and mutants before remaking it in his image and possesses the additional ability to enlarge himself. Throughout the series, he makes several attempts to instigate a war between humanity and mutants while his subordinate Mystique brainwashes select mutants to become his Horsemen, only to be foiled by the X-Men, Archangel, and the time-travellers Bishop and Cable throughout the first three seasons. In the four-part fourth season finale "Beyond Good and Evil", Cable destroys Apocalypse's Lazarus Chamber, the source of his immortality, but Apocalypse ends up in the Axis of Time and sets out to achieve godhood and destroy time. Despite being foiled by Professor X and the universe's most powerful psychics, Apocalypse ends up in the astral plane and eventually reincarnates himself in Fabian Cortez's body in the fifth season.
  - En Sabah Nur / Apocalypse appears in X-Men '97, with Apocalypse and Death voiced by Ross Marquand while Adetokumboh M'Cormack voiced a younger version of the character.
- Apocalypse appears in X-Men: Evolution, voiced by David Kaye. This version was abandoned as a baby before he was found by Baal's tribe of bandits, named "En Sabah Nur", and grew up to become a powerful warrior. After the Pharaoh Rama-Tut learned of Nur's power and slaughtered the bandits, Nur's full powers manifested, leading to him killing Rama-Tut's forces, renaming himself "Apocalypse", and taking the pharaoh's pyramid-like vessel and a device within it called the Eye of Ages. Using it to empower himself further, he intended to use it turn all humans on Earth into mutants, but was sealed in the vessel by his high priests for fear of his power. In the present, Apocalypse makes telepathic contact with Mesmero and tasks the latter with freeing him. Eventually, Mesmero succeeds in freeing Apocalypse who fuses with the vessel's futuristic technology, converts Magneto, Professor X, Storm, and Mystique into his Horsemen, and re-sets about fulfilling his plan. Ultimately, the X-Men, the Brotherhood of Bayville, and S.H.I.E.L.D. join forces to stop him, free his thralls, and send him far from Earth.
- Apocalypse makes non-speaking cameo appearances in Wolverine and the X-Men.

== Film ==
- A young En Sabah Nur appears in the post-credits scene of X-Men: Days of Future Past, portrayed by Brendan Pedder.
- En Sabah Nur / Apocalypse appears in X-Men: Apocalypse, portrayed by Oscar Isaac via a combination of extensive makeup and costuming coupled with practical and visual effects. This version emerged in Egypt during the Stone Age and developed technology that allows him to live forever by transferring his essence into the bodies of others, especially mutants, whose abilities he amassed with each transference. Throughout history, he has been worshiped as various gods such as Ra, Krishna, and Yahweh despite earning a reputation for destruction following in his wake. After transferring himself to a mutant with a healing factor during the Bronze Age, Apocalypse was sealed by rebels. After Moira MacTaggert accidentally awakens him in the 1980s, he recruits Storm, Psylocke, Archangel, and Magneto to serve as his Horsemen before setting out to create a world where only the strong survive, only to be foiled by Charles Xavier and his X-Men and killed by Jean Grey via the Phoenix Force.

== Video games ==
Apocalypse as he appears in X-Men Legends II: Rise of Apocalypse.

- Apocalypse appears as a boss in Spider-Man and the X-Men in Arcade's Revenge.
- Apocalypse appears as a boss in X-Men (1993).
- Apocalypse appears as a boss in X-Men 2: Clone Wars.
- Apocalypse appears as an unlockable boss in X-Men: Gamesmaster's Legacy.
- Apocalypse appears in X-Men: Mutant Apocalypse. This version is secretly based in Genosha.
- Apocalypse appears as a boss in X-Men vs. Street Fighter, voiced by Lorne Kennedy.
- Apocalypse appears as a boss in Marvel Super Heroes vs. Street Fighter, voiced again by Lorne Kennedy.
- Apocalypse appears in the Game Boy Color version of X-Men: Mutant Academy.
- Apocalypse appears in X-Men: Reign of Apocalypse.
- Apocalypse makes a cameo appearance in X-Men: Next Dimension.
- Apocalypse makes a minor appearance at the end of X2: Wolverine's Revenge, voiced by Christopher Corey Smith.
- Apocalypse appears in X-Men: The Ravages of Apocalypse.
- Apocalypse makes a cameo appearance in X-Men Legends, voiced by Dan Hay.
- Apocalypse appears as the final boss of X-Men Legends II: Rise of Apocalypse, voiced by Richard McGonagle.
- Apocalypse appeared in a teaser trailer for Marvel Heroes.
- Apocalypse appears as a playable character in Marvel: Future Fight.
- Apocalypse appears as a playable character in Marvel Puzzle Quest.
- Apocalypse appears as a playable character in Marvel Contest of Champions.
- Apocalypse appears as a playable character in Marvel Strike Force.
- Apocalypse appears in Marvel Realm of Champions.
- Apocalypse appears in Marvel Snap.
- Apocalypse appears in Marvel Rivals, voiced by Terrence Addison.
- Apocalypse appears at the end of Marvel's Wolverine while his voice is heard several times throughout the game, controlling Wolverine whenever he enters a berserk rage.

== See also ==
- X-Men in other media
- List of Marvel Comics characters
- Bibliography of Apocalypse
