= X-Men 2 =

X-Men 2 may refer to:

- X2 (film), a 2003 superhero film sequel based on the fictional characters X-Men
- X-Men 2: Wolverine's Revenge, a 2003 video game focusing on the character Wolverine
- X-Men 2: Clone Wars, a 1995 video game for the Sega Mega Drive/Genesis
- X-Men II: The Fall of the Mutants, a role-playing DOS game for the PC
