= X woman =

X woman or variations thereof may refer to:

- A female student of St. Francis Xavier University
  - St. Francis Xavier University X-Women
  - St. Francis Xavier X-Women
- X Women (original title: X Femmes), a French television series of short films from 2008–2009 on Canal+
- X-Women, female members of the X-Men
  - X-Women (Manara), a comic book from 2009 by Milo Manara and Chris Claremont
  - X-Women: The Sinister Virus, a 1997 video game for the Sega Genesis
- Woman X, a name given to the first Denisovan discovered
