= X-Women: The Sinister Virus =

- Developer: Clockwork Tortoise
- Publisher: Sega
- Producer: John Pedigo
- Programmer: John O' Brien
- Artists: Chris George; Robert Hunter; Stephen Thomson
- Series: X-Men
- Platform: Sega Genesis
- Release: Unreleased
- Genre: Action
- Mode: Single-player

X-Women: The Sinister Virus is an unreleased side-scrolling action video game that was in development by Clockwork Tortoise and planned to be published by Sega on a scheduled January 1997 release date exclusively for the Sega Genesis. Based on the popular X-Men Marvel Comics superheroes, it is inspired by the long-running comic book mythology and adaptations in other media. In the main storyline, a plot to incapacitate all male mutants by inflicting a disease known as the Genesis Virus upon them was orchestrated by Mister Sinister, leaving only the X-Women to scour through Earth in order to find the remaining viruses and develop a cure.

Production of X-Women: The Sinister Virus was influenced by the acclaim and success of previous X-Men titles on the Sega Genesis, as well as the positive reception to developer Clockwork Tortoise's previous title The Adventures of Batman & Robin. Development was headed by X-Men: Gamesmaster's Legacy co-producer John Pedigo, and the game was intended as one of the last first-party games for the Genesis in North America, but it faced a problematic development cycle. Although showcased at various trade shows, the title was ultimately shelved despite its release date being postponed several times for unknown reasons. It served as the last project by Clockwork Tortoise before the company was disbanded.

== Gameplay ==
Gameplay screenshot

X-Women: The Sinister Virus is a side-scrolling action game with beat 'em up elements reminiscent of Undercover Cops where players assume the role of either Storm, Jean Grey and Rogue to scour across Earth in order to find a cure against a deadly disease Mister Sinister inflicted upon all male mutants while fighting against an assortment of enemies as the main objective. Each of the playable X-Women has their own special powers and abilities. Unlike the original X-Men and X-Men 2: Clone Wars, each playable character also has the ability to fly in multiple directions across the levels.

== History ==
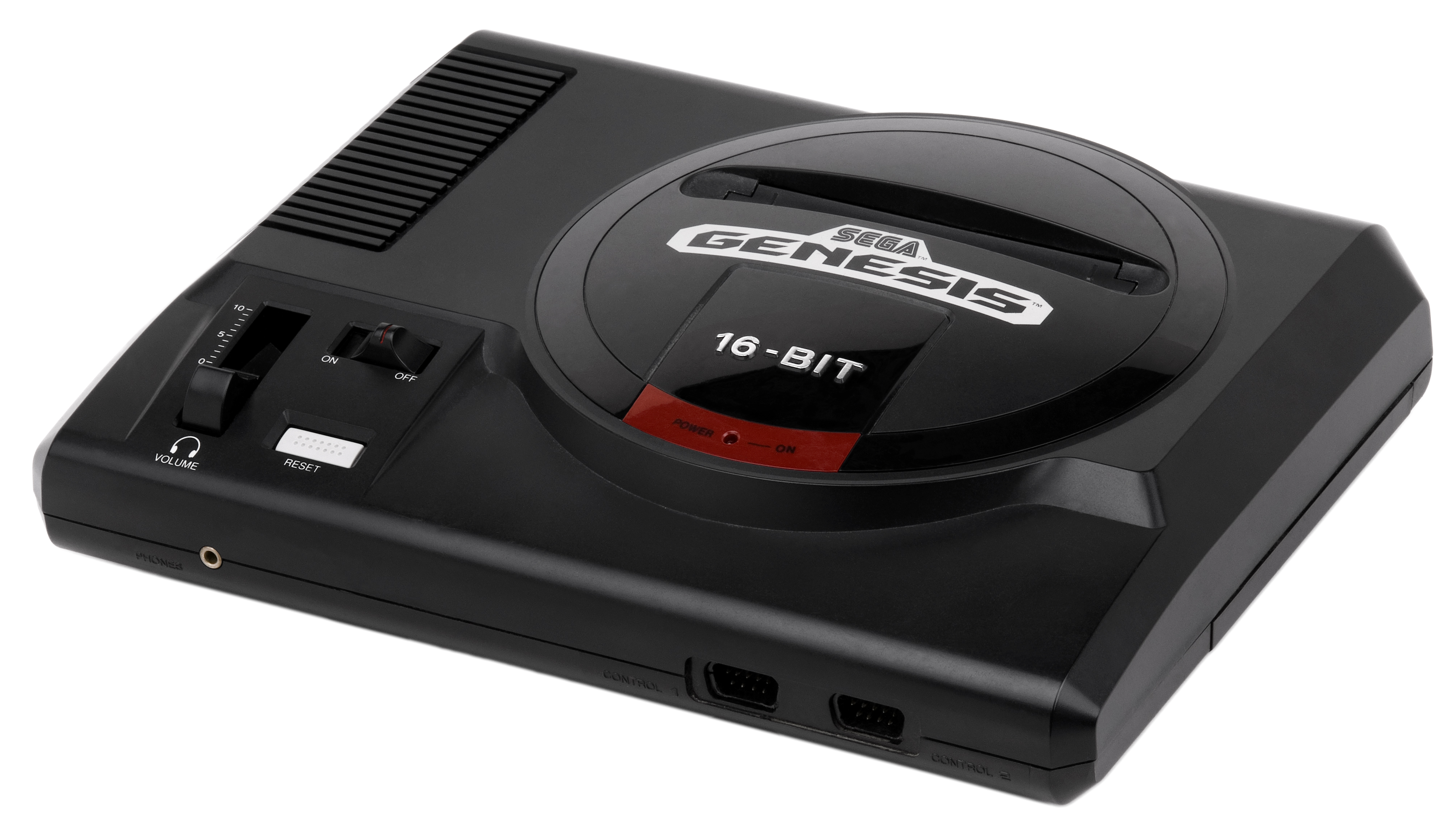
X-Women: The Sinister Virus was intended to serve as one of the last first-party releases for the Sega Genesis in North America but was cancelled for unknown reasons.

A follow-up to X-Men 2: Clone Wars focusing on the female members of the X-Men was planned due to acclaim and sales of previous X-Men titles for the Sega Genesis, as well as the positive reception Clockwork Tortoise garnered for their adaptations based on Batman: The Animated Series, which led them on being contracted to develop a third X-Men project for the Genesis after approval was given. X-Men: Gamesmaster's Legacy co-producer John Pedigo served as main producer of X-Women: The Sinister Virus, with John O' Brien acting as programmer of the project alongside artists Chris George, Robert Hunter and Stephen Thomson, among other team members collaborating in its development.

X-Women: The Sinister Virus was first showcased to the public in an early playable state at E3 1996 to positive response from the audience, with Sega touting the game for a late 1996 launch as one of their last first-party releases for the Genesis alongside other titles such as Sonic 3D Blast and Vectorman 2. The game's release was then delayed and now touted for a December 1996 launch, before being delayed one last time to January 1997 instead, with GamePro previewing the title in their November 1996 issue under the name Marvel Comics X-Women: The Sinister Virus. It was also reportedly demonstrated during the 1997 Innoventions exhibition at Epcot, but Pedigo said that the title did not make its appearance at the event. Its development and release were later cancelled for unknown reasons, but several factors have been given as to why the title was never published in recent years.

Pedigo has since stated in recent years that he owned a prototype of X-Women: The Sinister Virus that has since become unplayable and the only remaining proofs of its existence are various screenshots taken by several video game magazines and promotional gameplay footage, while no additional prototypes containing a ROM image of the game have been found to date. The title served as the last project developed by Clockwork Tortoise, as the company was disbanded due to internal issues.
