= Blackbird (comics) =

Aircraft used by the fictional superhero team the X-Men

Publication information
- Publisher: Marvel Comics
- First appearance: X-Men #94 (August 1975)
- Created by: Chris Claremont; Dave Cockrum

In story information
- Type: Jet aircraft
- Element of stories featuring: X-Men

The Blackbird (also known as the X-Jet) is a fictional jet aircraft appearing in American comic books published by Marvel Comics. Created by writer Chris Claremont and artist Dave Cockrum, the aircraft first appeared in X-Men #94 (August 1975). The Blackbird concept has survived multiple redesigns over the years. It is used primarily by the X-Men as a personal transport vehicle.

== Publication history ==
The Blackbird debuted in X-Men #94 (August 1975), created by Chris Claremont and Dave Cockrum. It appeared in the 2020 X-Men / Fantastic Four series.

== Fictional history ==
When the X-Men were introduced, they traveled in Professor Xavier's Lambert private jet and helicopter: advanced but fairly conventional aircraft with remote autopilots. When the series resumed in 1975, the X-Men flew a strato-jet that resembled a larger version of the Lockheed SR-71 "Blackbird" spy plane (hence the name), modified to carry several passengers and for Vertical Take-Off and Landing (VTOL). Some writers have referred to this design as the "SR-73", "SR-77", or the "SR-70". The original X-Men Blackbird has been destroyed and rebuilt numerous times in the course of the team's many adventures. The later versions incorporated technology created by the mutant inventor Forge, as well as alien (Shi'ar) technology, including weapons, holographic active camouflage, and engines capable of hypersonic speeds. One version of the Blackbird had an experimental cockpit windshield infused with traces of the same ruby quartz material used in Cyclops' visor, allowing him to project and amplify his optic blasts.

== Reception ==
=== Critical response ===
Jamie Lovett of ComicBook.com referred to the Blackbird as one of "Mavel's most iconic vehicles." Brad Hill of Sportskeeda included the Blackbird in their "10 Best Vehicles in Comic Books" list. Comic Book Resources ranked the Blackbird 1st in their "10 Best Vehicles In The Marvel Universe" list, 8th in their "10 Coolest Vehicles In Marvel Comics" list, and 10th in their "10 Most Important Vehicles In The Marvel Universe" list. Casey Haney of Screen Rant ranked the Blackbird 5th in their "16 Best Superhero Vehicles" list.

== Other versions ==
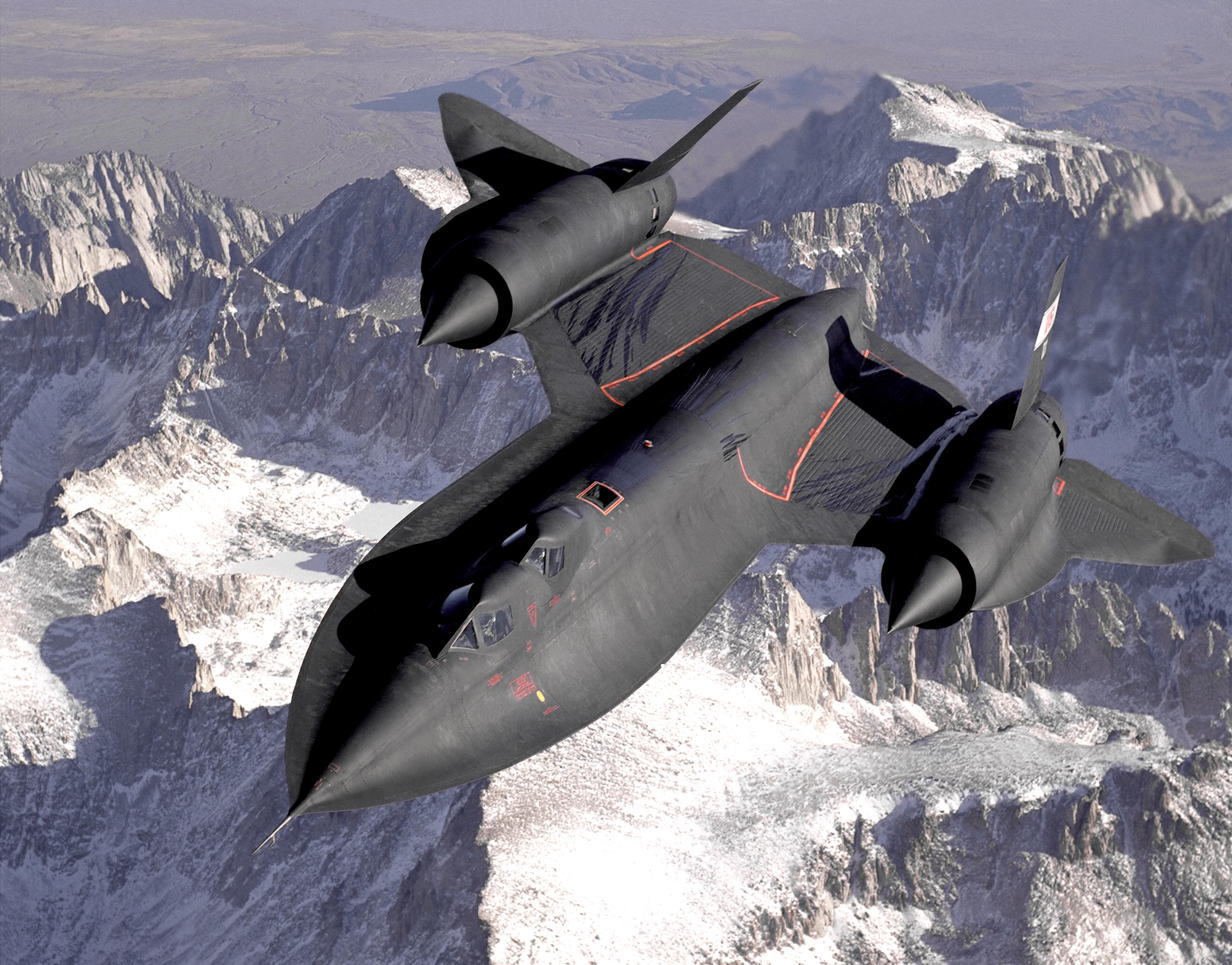
The Lockheed SR-71 Blackbird

Alternate versions of the Blackbird appear in the Ultimate X-Men series. The X-Men have several aircraft, including one that resembles a B-2 Spirit stealth bomber. It is also referred to as the "X-Wing." One of the airplanes has been referred to casually as the "Blackbird" owing to its resemblance to the SR-71.

== In other media ==
=== Television ===
- The Blackbird appears in X-Men: Pryde of the X-Men.
- The Blackbird appears in X-Men: The Animated Series.
- The Blackbird appears in the series finale of Fantastic Four: The Animated Series, where it fires at Doctor Doom who turns it to stone with the Power Cosmic.
- The X-Jet appears in X-Men: Evolution.
- The Blackbird appears in Wolverine and the X-Men.
- The Blackbird appears in Marvel Anime: X-Men.
- The Blackbird appears in X-Men '97.

=== Film ===
- The Blackbird appears in the X-Men film series.
  - The Blackbird appears in X-Men (2000).
  - The Blackbird appears in X2.
  - The Blackbird appears in X-Men: The Last Stand. The X-Jet now employs stealth technology that renders it invisible. It is later used to carry the X-Men to Alcatraz, where it is disintegrated by the Phoenix.
  - The Blackbird appears in X-Men: First Class. It is almost externally identical to the SR-71, though its internal layout is very different. It is later destroyed when a whirlwind created by Riptide causes it to crash.
  - The X-Jet appears in X-Men: Days of Future Past. In the future set in 2023, it contains a compact version of Cerebro. Magneto and Storm catapult the X-Jet and cause its tokamak reactor to explode, wiping many of the attacking Sentinels out.
  - The Blackbird appears in X-Men: Apocalypse. Havok tries to stop Apocalypse and the horsemen from taking Charles Xavier away but misses and hits one of the Blackbird's engines, causing the jet to explode.
  - The Blackbird appears in Dark Phoenix.
- A schematic of the Blackbird appears in Tony Stark's computer screen in Iron Man.
- The Blackbird appears in Deadpool and Deadpool 2.

=== Video games ===
- The Blackbird appears as a level in X-Men: Children of the Atom.
- The Blackbird appears as a level in X-Men vs. Street Fighter.
- The Blackbird appears as a level in Marvel Super Heroes vs. Street Fighter.
- The Blackbird, based on the Ultimate Marvel incarnation, appears in X-Men Legends.
- The Blackbird, based on the Ultimate Marvel incarnation, appears in X-Men Legends II: Rise of Apocalypse.

=== Merchandise ===
- In 2014, Lego released an X-Men set containing the Blackbird. In 2024, a similar set was released.
- In 2016, Funko released a Blackbird Funko Dorbz figure with Beast. In 2017, another Dorbz figure was released with Storm.
- In 2023, Hasbro released a Blackbird / X-Jet figurine.
