= Wolverine: Adamantium Rage =

1994 video game

Wolverine Adamantium Rage
- Packaging for the European Mega Drive version
- Developers: Teeny Weeny Games (Genesis); Bits Studios (Super NES)
- Publisher: Acclaim Entertainment (Note: Released under the LJN brand on the Super NES.)
- Producer: Mark Flitman
- Designers: SNES: Cos Lazouras; Jon Torrens; Peter Baron; Genesis: Paul Laidlaw; Ian Richards
- Programmers: SNES: Peter Baron; Genesis: Paul Laidlaw; Ian Richards
- Artists: SNES: Alan Grier; Genesis: Paul Laidlaw; Ian Richards
- Composers: SNES: Shahid Ahmad; Dylan Beale; Genesis: Jason Page; Rob Lord
- Platforms: Sega Genesis, Super NES
- Release: November 1994: Super Nintendo; NA: November 1994; EU: 1994 Genesis; NA: November 1994; EU: December 1994
- Genre: Action
- Mode: Single-player

Wolverine: Adamantium Rage is a platform-action video game released for both the Super NES and the Sega Genesis in 1994. Both versions were developed by different London studios: the Genesis version developed by Teeny Weeny Games and the Super NES version by Bits Studios. Both versions of the title were developed separately and differed from one another in some key areas, but their opening storyline and gameplay remain similar. It is one of the first action video games to feature a recharging health system.

== Story ==
=== Super NES version ===
Wolverine is mysteriously contacted by an unknown party claiming to have information regarding his past. Deciding to follow this lead, Wolverine travels to Canada, and then Japan, battling against the Destroyer Program, Tri-Fusion, and Lady Deathstrike. Deathstrike informs Wolverine that he has been tricked and lured out, as Shinobi Shaw has placed a contract on his life. Believing that Shaw is hiding out in the Inner Circle's base in Tokyo, Wolverine heads to track him down, battling Geist's forces and Bloodscream along the way. Cyber attempts to kill Wolverine by trapping him in a hallucinogenic nightmare, but Wolverine frees himself by turning Cyber's toxin against him.

Making his way to the Inner Circle's mansion, Wolverine battles against Selene and Fugue, while Shaw flees. Falling into the catacombs below the mansion, Wolverine fights Fugue for a second time, defeating her, and makes his way deeper. At the bottom of the catacombs, Wolverine discovers the true mastermind behind the contract against him--the Great Beast, leader of The Hand. Ultimately, Wolverine destroys the Beast, and returns to X-Mansion, where the X-Men greet him.

=== Genesis version ===
Recalling how Weapon X and Professor Thornton experimented upon him, Wolverine resolves to discover the secrets of his past. In his quest, he travels through a Weapon X facility, and then to the mountains, fighting off several attackers. Professor X contacts Wolverine to warn him of danger, but he refuses the X-Men's help, intent on settling things himself. After defeating the Wendigo, Wolverine travels to a jungle where he meets Storm, once again refusing her and the X-Men's help. He then battles against Lady Deathstrike and Sabretooth, learning from the latter that Shinobi Shaw has placed a contract on his life.

Tracking Shaw down to New York City, Wolverine is ambushed and poisoned by Cyber, trapping him in a hallucinogenic nightmare that he escapes by poisoning Cyber with his own toxin; then traveling to the Inner Circle's base to confront Shaw. Once Shaw is defeated, he and Wolverine fall into the catacombs below the base, where Trevor Fitzroy decides to finish both of them off. However, Wolverine overcomes Shaw's remaining forces, Bloodscream, and Fitzroy. Afterwards, he returns home, where he is congratulated by the X-Men.

== Gameplay ==
Both versions are action/adventure platformers, and the player guides through large multi-floored levels, attacking enemies or solving puzzles to give him access to new areas. The Super NES version requires a set number of enemies to be destroyed before entry to the next area is granted. Both versions have a time limit that expires if the player takes too long, whereupon Elsie-Dee automatically finds Wolverine and kills him, wasting one of his five lives (Genesis version) or giving the player a game over (Super NES version). Both games feature a password function that enables the player to continue the game at any level. Both games give Wolverine a percentage of his available health, always starting at 100%. Upon taking damage, his energy will recover over time thanks to his healing factor. The Super NES version has this being a slower process, but Genesis players have the benefit of a countdown timer to let them know how close Elsie-Dee is to finding Wolverine – this timer is reset at specific checkpoints.

Wolverine has different move sets based on what version the game is being played. The Super NES only grants Wolverine one main claw attack, but has Wolverine being able to climb on any wall or ceiling with his claws, and able to make springing leaps and perform high jumps. The more action-focused Genesis version has Wolverine being able to perform a multitude of claw attacks, and has a double jump that rolls Wolverine up into a ball and travel a short distance. The Sega version also gives the player a lunge attack which can be used to jump great distances as well as attack, and a quick roll which travels a great distance along the ground and allows Wolverine to go under all enemy bullets.

Each stage is usually ended with a boss confrontation, and these differ from level to level between each version as well. Despite being quicker paced and more combat-focused, the Sega version game also places more emphasis on basic puzzle solving and level navigation, and not forced enemy destruction like the Super NES version does.

== Music ==
The Super NES version's soundtrack, composed by Shahid Ahmad and Dylan Beale, is notable for its resemblance to grime music. According to Fact magazine, it features "all the hallmarks of early grime instrumentals: staccato strings, eski bleeps and square wave bass". This means it predates the first recognised grime track by eight years. The game's OST has been re-mastered as a Vinyl Record and is available for purchase from its composer.

== Reception ==
The game received mixed reviews. Electronic Gaming Monthly gave the Super NES version a 6.2 out of 10, remarking that, "Wolverine has plenty of moves and lots of technique, and fans of the comic character will definitely want to check this one out. But in the end, it's routine action". GamePro raved that "sharp graphics, nonstop action, and intense challenges make this game a formidable opponent for any supergamer!" They commented that the graphics and animation were comparable to "a comic book come to life". Next Generation reviewed the SNES version of the game, rating it two stars out of five, and stated that "you could get just as much 'Adamantium Rage' from an old copy of Impossible Mission. If you're a Wolverine fan, go for Capcom's SNES X-Men".

GamePro panned the Genesis version, criticizing the generic design, lack of excitement, and most especially the controls, which they said are so poor that even clearing the first level is almost impossible. They concluded, "when the highlights of a game are its mediocre graphics and sounds, that should trigger an immediate red flag". Electronic Gaming Monthly gave it a 4.25 out of 10. Though their four reviewers were divided about the game's graphics, they unanimously commented that the controls are remarkably poor. Two of them also complained about the number of "instant hits". Next Generation reviewed the Genesis version of the game, rating it two stars out of five, and stated that "Wolverine is a decent platform brawler, but in the end it's just another platform brawler. And around here that's only good for two".

== See also ==
- "Bamboo Houses" (1982), electronic song by Ryuichi Sakamoto and David Sylvian also similar to grime
