= X-Men: Madness in Murderworld =

1989 video game

- PC cover art
- Developer(s): Paragon Software
- Publisher(s): Paragon Software
- Platform(s): Amiga, Commodore 64, MS-DOS
- Release: 1989
- Genre(s): Adventure
- Mode(s): Single-player

X-Men: Madness in Murderworld is a video game for MS-DOS, Commodore 64, and Amiga systems, which was developed and published by Paragon Software in 1989. The following year, Paragon released a sequel, X-Men II: The Fall of the Mutants.

== Plot ==
Professor X has been kidnapped by Magneto and Arcade, and it's up to the X-Men to rescue him.

== Gameplay ==
The game is a side-scrolling arcade game featuring the X-Men. The original story takes place in Murderworld, a deadly amusement park designed by Arcade. The X-Men, which include Colossus, Cyclops, Dazzler, Nightcrawler, Storm, and Wolverine, are pitted against their arch-enemies Arcade and Magneto. The game has more than 500 action and combat screens, as well as some puzzle-solving. A limited edition original comic book that leads up to the action in the game was also included in the package.

== Reception ==
The game received positive reception from critics. Compute! Magazine gave its playability, documentation, originality, and graphics four out of five stars. Abandonia rated the game 3.0 out of 4.

== See also ==
- Spider-Man and the X-Men in Arcade's Revenge
