= X-Men: Reign of Apocalypse =

2001 video game

- Developer: Digital Eclipse Software
- Publisher: Activision
- Series: X-Men
- Platform: Game Boy Advance
- Release: NA: September 25, 2001; EU: October 5, 2001
- Genre: Beat 'em up
- Modes: Single-player, multiplayer

X-Men: Reign of Apocalypse is a 2001 beat 'em up game developed by Digital Eclipse and published by Activision for the Game Boy Advance. Players control the X-Men as they attempt to find the missing Professor X and stop Apocalypse from devastating the world.

== Plot ==
=== Story ===
Returning from their journey in the Mojoverse, the X-Men return to the destroyed remains of their home, the X-Mansion. They soon discover that they are in an alternate universe under the control of the evil mutant, Apocalypse. The X-Men must battle their way through Apocalypse's army of Sentinels and mutants to return to their universe.

=== Setting ===
The setting takes place in an alternate universe controlled by Apocalypse, with backgrounds that stay true to the X-Men comics. The X-Mansion, the Blackbird, Genosha, and other familiar locations are present in the game.

=== Characters ===
The playable X-Men roster consists of Wolverine, Cyclops, Storm, and Rogue. Each character has a different super power that gives them a unique playstyle. Boss enemies include classic villains from the comics such as Blob and Magneto. Other X-Men, such as Colossus and Nightcrawler, are allies of Apocalypse in the alternate universe and appear as enemies.

== Gameplay ==
X-Men: Reign of Apocalypse is a side-scrolling action beat 'em up with 12 distinct levels. Each level has waves of enemies plus a mutant boss who all must be defeated to progress to the next stage. Players must defeat enemies to earn points which can be spent at the end of each stage to improve the character's strength, vitality, or mutant power. All playable characters share the same basic attacks, but each one has a unique special ability: Wolverine has claws that excel in close-range combat, Rogue has a charge ability, Storm controls tornado projectiles, and Cyclops has long-range optic blasts.

=== Multiplayer ===
Up to two players can play cooperatively in campaign mode, or play against each other in a competitive mode to pit two of the playable characters in battle.

== Reception ==
Reception

Aggregate scores
Aggregator	Score
GameRankings	59.34%
Metacritic	61/100

Review scores
Publication	Score
AllGame	2.5/5
Electronic Gaming Monthly	3/10
Game Informer	7.75/10
GamePro	2/5
GameSpot	7.1/10
GameZone	6.8/10
IGN	7/10
Nintendo Power	2.5/5
Nintendo World Report	5/10

X-Men: Reign of Apocalypse received mixed reviews upon release. Aggregate review websites Metacritic and GameRankings scored the game 61 out of 100 and 59.34%, respectively. The reviewer at GameSpot recommended the portable game to X-Men and beat 'em up game fans, but was disappointed by the simplistic gameplay and ending. Nintendojo concluded that it was "a fun game that ends much too quickly".
