= X-Men: Wolverine's Rage =

2001 video game

- Developer: Digital Eclipse
- Publisher: Activision
- Platform: Game Boy Color
- Release: NA: May 18, 2001; EU: June 15, 2001
- Genre: Action
- Mode: Single-player

X-Men: Wolverine's Rage is a side-scrolling video game for the Game Boy Color. A sequel to X-Men: Mutant Wars (2000), Wolverine's Rage follows the story of Wolverine as he chases down Lady Deathstrike, Sabretooth, and Cyber.

== Plot ==
Lady Deathstrike discovers schematics allowing her to build a weapon that will melt Wolverine's adamantium skeleton. Lady Deathstrike decides to go ahead with the machine and Wolverine has to do whatever it takes to track her down and stop her.

== Gameplay ==
Gameplay in Wolverine's Rage is relatively simple and repetitive. There are twenty levels in the game, grouped into chapters of five with a boss battle at the end of each one. If Wolverine is hurt he can regenerate his health back. The objective on most of the levels is to run through them before time runs out, battling enemies on the way. The player uses a password system in order to continue the game.

== Reception ==
Reception

Aggregate score
Aggregator	Score
GameRankings	56%

Review scores
Publication	Score
AllGame	2.5/5
Game Informer	7/10, 5/10
GameSpot	5.4/10
IGN	7/10
Nintendo Power	2.5/5
Power Unlimited	62%

The game was met with mixed reviews, as GameRankings gave it 56%.

Power Unlimited gave the game a rating of 62% summarizing: "All in all, a somewhat simplistic game that will certainly find favor with the loyal X-Men fans, but even they will have to admit that Activision has taken it a bit easy for the third time in a row."
