= X2 (film) =

2003 film by Bryan Singer

- Theatrical release poster
- Directed by: Bryan Singer
- Screenplay by: Michael Dougherty; Dan Harris; David Hayter
- Story by: Zak Penn; David Hayter; Bryan Singer
- Based on: X-Men by: Stan Lee; Jack Kirby
- Produced by: Lauren Shuler Donner; Ralph Winter
- Starring: Patrick Stewart; Hugh Jackman; Ian McKellen; Halle Berry; Famke Janssen; James Marsden; Rebecca Romijn; Brian Cox; Alan Cumming; Bruce Davison; Anna Paquin
- Cinematography: Newton Thomas Sigel
- Edited by: John Ottman
- Music by: John Ottman
- Production companies: 20th Century Fox; Marvel Enterprises; The Donners' Company; Bad Hat Harry Productions
- Distributed by: 20th Century Fox
- Release dates: April 24, 2003 (London); May 2, 2003 (United States)
- Running time: 133 minutes
- Country: United States
- Language: English
- Budget: $110–125 million
- Box office: $407.7 million

X2 (also marketed with the subtitle X-Men United, and known internationally as X-Men 2) is a 2003 American superhero film based on Marvel Comics' X-Men superhero team. Directed by Bryan Singer and written by Michael Dougherty, Dan Harris and David Hayter, from a story by Singer, Hayter and Zak Penn, it is the second installment in the X-Men film series and the sequel to X-Men (2000). It stars an ensemble cast including Patrick Stewart, Hugh Jackman, Ian McKellen, Halle Berry, Famke Janssen, James Marsden, Rebecca Romijn, Brian Cox, Alan Cumming, Bruce Davison, Shawn Ashmore, Aaron Stanford, Kelly Hu, and Anna Paquin. The plot concerns the genocidal Colonel William Stryker leading an assault on Professor Xavier's school to build his own version of Xavier's mutant-tracking computer, Cerebro, to destroy every mutant on Earth and to save the human race from them, forcing the X-Men to team up with the Brotherhood of Mutants to stop Stryker and save the mutant race.

Development on the sequel began shortly after the first film was released on July 14, 2000, by 20th Century Fox. David Hayter and Zak Penn wrote separate scripts, combining what they felt to be the best elements of both scripts into one screenplay. Michael Dougherty and Dan Harris were eventually hired to rewrite the work, and changed the characterizations of Beast, Angel, and Lady Deathstrike. Sentinels and the Danger Room were set to appear before being deleted because of budget concerns from Fox. The film's premise was influenced by comic storyline "Return to Weapon X" and the graphic novel God Loves, Man Kills. Filming began in June 2002 and ended that November, mostly taking place at Vancouver Film Studios, the largest North American production facility outside of Los Angeles. Production designer Guy Hendrix Dyas adapted similar designs by John Myhre from the previous film.

X2 was released in the United States on May 2, 2003, by 20th Century Fox, and received positive reviews for its storyline, musical score, action sequences, and performances. The film grossed $407 million worldwide, making it the ninth-highest-grossing film of 2003, and received eight Saturn Awards nominations. A sequel, X-Men: The Last Stand, was released on May 26, 2006.

== Plot ==
At the White House, a teleporting mutant, Nightcrawler, attacks the President of the United States; he is shot and retreats. Meanwhile, Logan explores an abandoned military installation at Alkali Lake in Alberta for clues to his past, but finds nothing. Jean Grey has been having premonitions and struggles to concentrate as her powers become increasingly difficult to control.

Later, Logan returns to Professor Xavier's school for mutants, and Xavier tracks Nightcrawler using Cerebro. Xavier and Cyclops go to question the imprisoned Magneto (Note: As depicted in X-Men (2000)) about the attack, while Jean and Storm retrieve Nightcrawler. Military scientist Colonel William Stryker approaches the President and receives approval to investigate Xavier's mansion for their ties to mutants after the recent attack. Stryker's forces invade the school and abduct some of the students. Colossus leads the remaining students to safety while Logan, Rogue, Iceman, and Pyro escape. Stryker's assistant Yuriko Oyama captures Cyclops and Xavier. During the attack, Logan confronts Stryker, who addresses him as "Wolverine" and appears to be aware of his past.

The shapeshifting mutant, Mystique, helps Magneto escape and finds Cerebro schematics. Logan, Rogue, Iceman, and Pyro visit Iceman's family in Boston. Iceman's brother calls the police after learning he's a mutant. Officers surround the house; one shoots Logan after feeling threatened. Pyro fights back against officers with his pyrokinesis but Rogue absorbs his powers and uses them to put out the fire, while Storm, Jean, and Nightcrawler pick them up in their jet.

Despite Storm and Jean's defenses, the X-Jet is attacked by fighter jets and shot down while returning to the mansion. Rogue is sucked out but is saved by Nightcrawler, while Magneto controls the jet and saves everyone from the crash. He explains that Stryker built a second Cerebro to kill every mutant telepathically, using his mutant son Jason, who can control minds, to coerce Xavier. Stryker previously used Jason's powers on Nightcrawler to attack the White House to justify his excuse for invading Xavier's mansion. Magneto also tells Logan that Stryker grafted adamantium onto his bones and caused his amnesia. Jean, reading Nightcrawler's mind, discovers Stryker's underground base in a dam at Alkali Lake.

Disguised as Logan, Mystique infiltrates Stryker's base and lets mutants in while she and Magneto head to disable Cerebro before a brainwashed Xavier can activate it. Storm and Nightcrawler rescue students while Jean fights a mind-controlled Cyclops; their fight frees Cyclops but damages the dam, causing it to rupture. Logan finds Stryker in an adamantium smelting lab, recalling where he got his skeleton. Logan fights and kills Yuriko then chases Stryker to a helicopter pad and chains him to the wheel. Magneto stops Cerebro and, with Mystique impersonating Stryker to command Jason, has Xavier redirect its powers on humans. They escape in Stryker's helicopter with Pyro. Nightcrawler teleports Storm inside Cerebro where she creates a snowstorm to break Jason's concentration and free Xavier.

As the dam bursts and kills Stryker in the process, the X-Men attempt to flee but their X-Jet loses power and struggles to take off as floodwaters approach. Jean sneaks off the jet to hold back the rising water and raise the jet above. Jean telepathically says goodbye through Xavier as flames erupt from her body until she releases and the flood crashes down on her. In Washington D.C., the X-Men - now featuring Xavier, Logan, Storm, Cyclops, Rogue, Iceman, and Nightcrawler as members - give Stryker's files to the President as Xavier warns that humans and mutants must unite for peace. At the school, Xavier, Cyclops, and Logan remember Jean and Xavier begins a class. Meanwhile, a Phoenix-like shape rises from flooded Alkali Lake.

== Cast ==
- Patrick Stewart as Professor Charles Xavier:
  A powerful telepathic mutant who uses a wheelchair, who founded a School for "Gifted Youngsters", Xavier is a pacifist who believes humans and mutants can live together in harmony. He uses the Cerebro device, designed by Magneto and himself, to track and locate mutants across the world. A natural genius, Xavier is regarded as an authority on genetic mutation.
- Hugh Jackman as Logan / Wolverine:
  A mysterious mutant who suffers from amnesia and has little to no recollection of his past life before he was grafted with an indestructible adamantium skeleton. Wolverine is a gruff loner, but is in love with Jean Grey and acts as a father figure to Rogue. He wields six highly durable adamantium blades that come out of each of his fists, has keen animal-like senses, can heal rapidly from virtually any injury, and is a ruthless and aggressive fighter.
- Ian McKellen as Erik Lehnsherr / Magneto:
  Once Xavier's ally, Magneto now believes mutants are superior to humans and that a genetic war is coming. Magneto wields the ability to manipulate metal magnetically, as well as the power to create magnetic fields and fly. He wears a helmet that renders him immune to Xavier's powers and all related telepathic powers. Imprisoned after his scheme in the first film, he is drugged by William Stryker for information about Cerebro and the Xavier Institute, before making his escape and forming an alliance with the X-Men to stop Stryker. He has demonstrated sophisticated knowledge in matters of genetic manipulation and engineering. The character's helmet was slightly redesigned as McKellen found wearing it uncomfortable in X-Men.
- Halle Berry as Ororo Munroe / Storm:
  A mutant and teacher at Xavier's School who can control the weather with her mind. Storm befriends Nightcrawler. Berry dropped out of Jennifer Lopez's role in Gigli to reprise the role.
- Famke Janssen as Jean Grey:
  A mutant and teacher at Xavier's school and the X-Mansion's doctor, Jean has begun to experience a growth in her telepathy and telekinetic powers since the X-Men's battle with Magneto. She is Cyclops' fiancée, even though she is attracted to Wolverine.
- James Marsden as Scott Summers / Cyclops:
  The field leader of the X-Men, and a teacher at Xavier's Institute, he shoots uncontrollable beams of concussive force from his eyes and wears a visor to control them. He is engaged to Jean. Cyclops is taken prisoner and brainwashed by Stryker.
- Rebecca Romijn-Stamos as Mystique:
  Magneto's shapeshifting henchwoman, Mystique is blue, covered in scales, and acts as a spy. She injects a prison guard with metal, with which Magneto makes his escape, and also sexually tempts Wolverine. Romijn's makeup previously took nine hours to apply during the filming of X-Men, but the make-up department was able to bring it down to six hours for X2.
- Brian Cox as Colonel William Stryker:
  A military scientist who plans a worldwide genocide of mutants using Xavier and Cerebro. Stryker has experimented on mutants in the past, including Wolverine, and uses a serum to control them, using his own son as the test subject. Singer opted to cast Cox in the role as he was a fan of his performance as Hannibal Lecter in Manhunter.
- Alan Cumming as Kurt Wagner / Nightcrawler:
  A kindly German mutant with a strong Catholic faith, yet ironically he has the appearance of a blue demon. Nightcrawler was used by Stryker in an assassination attempt on the President of the United States and gave help to the X-Men. He is capable of teleporting himself (and others) instantly from one location to another. On his body are many tattoos, one for every sin. Cumming had always been Singer's choice for the role, but Cumming could not accept the part due to scheduling conflicts. Neil Patrick Harris auditioned for the role, and Ethan Embry had been reported to be in contention, but the film labored in development long enough for Cumming to accept the part. Singer also felt comfortable in casting Cumming since he is fluent in German. The drawings of Adam Kubert were used as inspiration for Nightcrawler's makeup design, which took four hours to apply. For the scene where Nightcrawler has his shirt off, Cumming went through nine hours. To best pose as Nightcrawler, Cumming studied comic books and illustrations of the character.
- Bruce Davison as Senator Robert Kelly: Although Kelly was killed in the first film, Davison reprised the role for scenes where Mystique uses his persona to infiltrate the government.
- Anna Paquin as Marie / Rogue:
  A girl who can absorb any person's memories and abilities by touching them. As she cannot control this power, Rogue can easily kill anyone and thus is unable to be close to people.
- Shawn Ashmore as Bobby Drake / Iceman:
  Rogue's boyfriend, he can freeze objects and create ice. His family is unaware that he is a mutant and simply believes he is at a boarding school. After returning home, Bobby reveals to them what he is, much to his brother's derision.
- Aaron Stanford as John Allerdyce / Pyro:
  A friend of Bobby and Rogue, Pyro has anti-social tendencies and can control (although not create) fire. The filmmakers cast Stanford in the role after they were impressed with his performance in Tadpole.
- Kelly Hu as Yuriko Oyama / Deathstrike:
  A mutant with a healing ability like Wolverine's and who is controlled by Stryker. She wields long adamantium fingernails. Only her first name is mentioned in the dialogue.

Additionally, Daniel Cudmore portrayed Peter Rasputin / Colossus: a mutant with the ability to turn his body into metal, the character's importance was reduced to a cameo, Michael Reid MacKay portrayed Jason 143, William Stryker's son who could create illusions. Keely Purvis portrayed the little girl whom Jason uses as an avatar when controlling Xavier. Cotter Smith portrayed US President McKenna, and Ty Olsson portrayed Mitchell Laurio, the security guard for Magneto's prison cell. Cameo appearances include Katie Stuart as Kitty Pryde, Bryce Hodgson as Artie Maddicks, Kea Wong as Jubilation Lee / Jubilee, Steve Bacic as Dr. Hank McCoy and Shauna Kain as Theresa Rourke / Siryn. Gambit's cameo was shot, but the footage was not used in the final cut. Also in the final scene with Xavier, a girl is seen dressed in a Native American-style jacket, as well as a blond-haired boy dressed in blue, played by Layke Anderson. In the film's DVD commentary, the two are identified as Danielle Moonstar and Douglas Ramsey. Michael Dougherty and Dan Harris, the film's writers, make cameo appearances as surgeons in Wolverine's flashbacks to his time at Weapon X. Chiara Zanni, who voiced Jubilee in X-Men: Evolution (2000–2003), appears as a White House tour guide at the start of the film.

== Production ==
=== Writing ===
The financial and critical success of X-Men (2000) persuaded 20th Century Fox to immediately commission a sequel. Starting in November 2000, Bryan Singer researched various storylines (one of them being the Legacy Virus) of the X-Men comic book series. Singer wanted to study, "the human perspective, the kind of blind rage that feeds into warmongering and terrorism," citing a need for a "human villain". Bryan and producer Tom DeSanto envisioned X2 as the film series' equivalent to the Star Wars franchise's The Empire Strikes Back (1980), in that the characters are "all split apart, and then dissected, and revelations occur that are significant... the romance comes to fruition and a lot of things happen". Producer Avi Arad announced a planned November 2002 theatrical release date, while David Hayter and Zak Penn were hired to write separate scripts. Hayter and Penn combined what they felt to be the best elements of both scripts into one screenplay. Singer and Hayter worked on another script, finishing in October 2001. Penn was partially hired when he convinced Singer to not adapt the "Dark Phoenix Saga" storyline for the film, feeling that the franchise's universe should be established much more before "going cosmic". Instead, in what he feels was his major contribution to the project, Penn based the film's outline on Chris Claremont's graphic novel X-Men: God Loves, Man Kills (1982) before leaving to work on another film.

Concept art of the Danger Room before the setpiece was stored due to budgetary concerns

Michael Dougherty and Dan Harris were hired to rewrite Hayter and Penn's script in February 2002, turning down the opportunity to write Urban Legends: Bloody Mary (2005). They turned in hundreds of drafts to Singer. Angel and Beast appeared in early drafts, but were deleted because there were too many characters. Dr. Hank McCoy can be seen on a television interview in one scene. Beast's appearance was to resemble Jim Lee's 1991 artwork of the character in the series X-Men: Legacy. Angel was to have been a mutant experiment by William Stryker, transforming into Archangel. A reference to Dougherty's and Harris's efforts to include Angel remains in the form of an X-ray on display in one of Stryker's labs. Tyler Mane was to reprise as Sabretooth before the character was deleted. In Hayter's script, the role eventually filled by Lady Deathstrike was Anne Reynolds, a character who appears in God Loves, Man Kills as Stryker's personal assistant/assassin. Singer changed her to Deathstrike, citing a need for "another kick-ass mutant". There was to be more development on Cyclops and Professor X being brainwashed by Stryker. The scenes were shot, but Fox cut them out because of time length and story complications. Hayter was disappointed, feeling that James Marsden deserved more screentime.

Rewrites were commissioned once more, specifically to give Halle Berry more screen time. This was because of her recent popularity in Monster's Ball (2002), earning her the Academy Award for Best Actress. A budget cut meant that the Sentinels and the Danger Room were dropped. Guy Hendrix Dyas and a production crew had already constructed the Danger Room set. In the words of Dyas, "The control room [of the Danger Room] was a large propeller that actually rotated around the room so that you can sit up [in that control room] and travel around the subject who is in the middle of the control room. The idea for the traveling is that if it's a mutant who has some kind of mind control powers, they can't connect."

=== Production ===
Producer Lauren Shuler Donner had hoped to start filming in March 2002, but production did not begin until June 17, 2002, in Vancouver and ended by November. Over sixty-four sets were used in thirty-eight different locations. The film crew encountered problems when there was insufficient snow in Kananaskis, Alberta for them to use for some scenes. A large amount of fake snow was then applied. The idea to have Jean Grey sacrifice herself at the end and to be resurrected in a third installment was highly secretive. Singer did not tell Famke Janssen until midway through filming. While filming the scene where Xavier and Lehnsherr play chess, Stewart and McKellen had no clue how to play chess so a Canadian grandmaster was called on set for a day. Cinematographer Newton Thomas Sigel and two stunt drivers nearly died when filming the scene in which Pyro has a dispute with police officers. James Bamford worked as Hugh Jackman's stunt double for rehearsals until he suffered an injury; due to Bamford's looks, Singer asked him to play the role of Gambit for a cameo appearance, but Gambit's scene was deleted from the film's final cut. According to Alan Cumming, Singer began berating the cast which led to Halle Berry saying to Singer "you can kiss my black ass". Cumming would also later say that working on the film was "dangerous" and "abusive".

John Ottman composed the score. Ottman established a new title theme, as well as themes specifically for Magneto, Jean Grey, Nightcrawler, Mystique, and Pyro.

=== Design and visual effects ===
Nightcrawler's tail was mainly computer-generated imagery, although Alan Cumming sometimes used one made of rubber.

Singer and Sigel credited Road to Perdition (2002) as a visual influence. Though Sigel shot the first X-Men in anamorphic format, he opted to shoot X2 in Super 35. Sigel felt the recent improvements in film stocks and optics increased the advantages of using spherical lenses, even if the blowup to anamorphic must be accomplished optically instead of digitally. Sigel noted, "If you think about it, every anamorphic lens is simply a spherical lens with an anamorphizer on it. They'll never be as good as the spherical lenses that they emulate." Cameras that were used during filming included two Panaflex Millenniums and a Millennium XL, as well as an Aaton 35mm. Singer also used zoom lenses more often than he did in his previous films, while Sigel used a Frazier lens specifically for dramatic moments.

The Blackbird was redesigned and increased in virtual size from 60 feet to 85 feet. John Myhre served as the production designer on the first film, but Singer hired Guy Hendrix Dyas for X2, which was his first film as a production designer. For scenes involving Stryker's Alkali Base, Vancouver Film Studios, the largest sound stage in North America, was reserved.

Visual effects supervisor Mike Fink was not satisfied with his work on the previous film, despite the fact that it nearly received an Academy Award nomination. Up to 520 shots were created for X-Men, while X2 commissioned roughly 800. A new computer program was created by Rhythm & Hues Studios (R&H) for the dogfight tornado scene. Cinesite was in charge of scenes concerning Cerebro, enlisting a 20-man crew. The Alkali Lake Dam miniature was 25 feet (7.6 m) high and 28 feet (8.5 m) wide. Cinesite created 300 visual effects shots, focusing on character animation, while Rhythm and Hues created over 100. Janssen would later admit that she was not a fan of working with green screen on the set of the film.

=== Post-production ===
The first cut of X2 was rated R by the Motion Picture Association of America, due to violent shots with Logan when Stryker's army storms the X-Mansion. A few seconds were cut to secure a PG-13 rating.

== Music ==
The film's score was composed by John Ottman, a regular collaborator with film director Bryan Singer. The soundtrack album X2: Original Motion Picture Score was released on April 29, 2003. Ottman used a sample of Wolfgang Amadeus Mozart's Requiem as the basis for the music in scenes featuring Nightcrawler. As well as the music on the album, tracks by Conjure One and 'N Sync also featured in the film.

On July 19, 2012, La-La Land Records and Fox Music issued an expanded version of Ottman's score, including the specially recorded version of Alfred Newman's 20th Century Fox fanfare incorporating Ottman's film theme.

== Release ==
=== Theatrical ===
The film premiered in London on April 24, 2003, and then had the widest release ever, opening on May 2, 2003, in 93 markets, on 7,316 screens overseas and in 3,741 theaters in the United States and Canada.

=== Home media ===
X2 was released on DVD in widescreen and fullscreen formats as well as VHS on November 25, 2003, by 20th Century Fox Home Entertainment. The two-disc DVD includes over three hours of special features. X2 was also released on Blu-ray and additionally as a Blu-ray, DVD, and digital-copy combination in 2011 with special features. The film is included in the 4K Ultra HD Blu-ray set X-Men: 3-Film Collection, which was released on September 25, 2018.

== Reception ==
=== Box office ===
X2 opened May 2, 2003, accumulating $85.6 million on its opening weekend in 3,749 theaters in the United States and Canada. Overseas, it grossed $69.27 million in its first five days, including previews. The film exceeded Harry Potter and the Chamber of Secrets in terms of number of screenings. X2 would hold this record until the following year, when it was taken by Shrek 2. It surpassed Star Wars: Episode II – Attack of the Clones for having the highest opening weekend for a 20th Century Fox film. For two weeks, it stayed in the number 1 spot before being displaced by The Matrix Reloaded. X2, The Matrix Reloaded, Finding Nemo, Bruce Almighty and Pirates of the Caribbean: The Curse of the Black Pearl all became the first five films to cross the $200-million mark at the box office in one summer season. The film grossed $214.9 million in the United States and Canada, the sixth-highest-grossing film of 2003, earning $192.8 million overseas, for a worldwide total of $407.7 million, the ninth-highest-grossing film of 2003. It earned $107 million in its first five days when released on DVD.

=== Critical response ===
X2 received positive reviews, with praise aimed at the acting, action, and story. The review-aggregation website Rotten Tomatoes reports that 85% of critics gave the film a positive review, based on 249 reviews with an average score of 7.5/10. The website's consensus states: "Tightly scripted, solidly acted, and impressively ambitious, X2: X-Men United is bigger and better than its predecessor—and a benchmark for comic sequels in general." Metacritic calculated a weighted average score of 68 out of 100, based on reviews from 37 critics, indicating "generally favorable reviews". Audiences surveyed by CinemaScore gave the film a grade A on scale of A to F.

Roger Ebert was impressed by how Singer was able to handle so many characters in one film, but felt "the storyline did not live up to its potential". In addition, Ebert wrote that the film's closing was perfect for a future installment, giving X2 three out of four stars. Kenneth Turan of the Los Angeles Times wrote that it was rare for a sequel to be better than its predecessor. Turan observed that the film carried emotional themes that are present in the world today and commented that "the acting was better than usual [for a superhero film]". Peter Travers of Rolling Stone wrote that Hugh Jackman heavily improved his performance, concluding "X2 is a summer firecracker. It's also a tribute to outcasts, teens, gays, minorities, even Dixie Chicks." Empire called X2 the best comic book film of all time in 2006, while Wizard named the film's ending as the 22nd greatest cliffhanger of all time. In May 2007, Rotten Tomatoes listed X2 as the fifth greatest comic book film of all time.

Mick LaSalle of the San Francisco Chronicle was critical of the storyline, special effects, and action scenes. Joe Morgenstern of The Wall Street Journal specifically referred to the film as "fast-paced, slow-witted". Stephen Hunter of The Washington Post wrote "Of the many comic book superhero movies, this is by far the lamest, the loudest, the longest". Richard Corliss of Time argued that Singer depended too much on seriousness and that he did not have enough sensibilities to communicate to an audience.

=== Accolades ===
The film won the Saturn Award for Best Science Fiction Film. In addition, Bryan Singer (Direction), Dan Harris and Michael Dougherty (Writing), and John Ottman (Music) all received nominations. It also received nominations for its costumes, makeup, special effects, and DVD release, amounting to a total of eight nominations. The Political Film Society honored X2 in the categories of Human Rights and Peace, while the film was nominated for the Hugo Award for Best Dramatic Presentation (Long Form).

== Sequel ==
After the success of the second film in the franchise, a sequel titled X-Men: The Last Stand was released in 2006.

== Video games ==
A video game titled X2: Wolverine's Revenge was released in April 2003 for PlayStation 2, GameCube, Windows, Xbox and Game Boy Advance. Patrick Stewart reprises his role as Professor X, while Hugh Jackman's likeness was featured on the cover as Wolverine.

Another game, titled X-Men: The Official Game, was released in May 2006 for PlayStation 2, GameCube, Microsoft Windows, Xbox, Xbox 360, Game Boy Advance, and Nintendo DS. The game bridges the time period between X2 and The Last Stand and uses several voice actors from the film franchise.
