= X-Men: Mutant Apocalypse =

1994 video game

- North American cover art
- Developer: Capcom
- Publisher: Capcom
- Producer: Tokuro Fujiwara
- Composer: Setsuo Yamamoto
- Series: X-Men
- Platform: Super NES
- Release: NA: November 1994; JP: January 3, 1995; EU: 1995
- Genres: Platform, beat-'em-up
- Mode: Single-player

X-Men: Mutant Apocalypse is an action game developed and published by Capcom for the Super Nintendo Entertainment System in 1994. The game is based on the X-Men comic book franchise from Marvel Comics, being the first such game released by Capcom, a month before the fighting game X-Men: Children of the Atom.

In Mutant Apocalypse, players control five of the X-Men: Beast, Cyclops, Gambit, Psylocke, and Wolverine. After guiding each of them through their own dedicated levels, players can then select which level to complete next as well as the team member to complete it with. The end goal is to defeat Magneto on his Avalon space station. The game was well received by critics.

The game was re-released on an Arcade1Up cabinet that also included X-Men: Children of the Atom, X-Men vs. Street Fighter, and Marvel vs. Capcom: Clash of Super Heroes.

== Gameplay ==
Psylocke's first stage

The player takes control of five X-Men who each have their own objectives, and different moves and capabilities activated by certain control combinations. The player has a limited number of lives that count for all five X-Men and not one individually.

The levels may be played in any order. At the end of each level, a boss must be battled and defeated. The next three levels are linear and require each boss level to be defeated. This is followed by two straightforward boss battles in the Danger Room. Finally only one of the X-Men can be selected, each one going through a different end level.

After beating the first five stages, a password can be acquired. The game has health pickups, as well as extra lives in the form of collecting three "X" icons hidden throughout each stage.

== Characters ==
- Beast - Possesses superhuman physical strength, agility and ape-like appearance.
- Cyclops - Produces powerful, uncontrollable beams of concussive force from his eyes, forcing him to wear a specialized visor at all times.
- Gambit - Has the ability to manipulate kinetic energy and charge objects with it and is also skilled in card-throwing, hand-to-hand and staff combat.
- Psylocke - She can use her telepathic powers to form a 'psychic knife' from her fist. An expert martial artist, she has the most techniques of all the playable characters.
- Wolverine - A gruff mutant possessing superhuman senses, enhanced physical capabilities, adamantium-coated bones and claws and regenerative abilities.

== Plot ==
Charles Xavier sends five of his X-Men to sabotage various operations and structures on the Genosha island complex to liberate mutants in captivity. Further investigation reveals Queen Brood and Tusk involved in this matter and headed by Apocalypse.

After defeating all evil forces on Genosha. Xavier finds out that Magneto intends to destroy Genosha from his space station Avalon. To prepare for the confrontation, Xavier tests the five X-Men in the Danger Room to defeat holograms of Omega Red and Juggernaut. After passing the tests, the X-Men go their separate paths inside Avalon facing and defeating Exodus and then battling Magneto and thwarting his plans.

== Reception ==
Reception

Review scores
Publication	Score
AllGame	3.5/5
Electronic Gaming Monthly	8/10, 8/10, 7/10, 8/10
Game Informer	8.75/10, 8.25/10
Game Players	80%
GameFan	75/100, 70/100, 78/100
Hyper	79%
Next Generation	3/5
Official Nintendo Magazine	73/100
Super Play	52%
Total!	(UK) 78/100, (DE) 3
Electronic Games	B
VideoGames	7/10

X-Men: Mutant Apocalypse garnered generally favorable reviews from critics. Three of Electronic Gaming Monthly's four reviewers declared it to be the best video game based on the X-Men to date, citing the large levels and demanding difficulty. Though they remarked that it "may become repetitive after a while", GamePro concluded that the game is "a solid hit," particularly praising the graphics, the high difficulty, and the Street Fighter II stylistics. Next Generation stated that "While it would've been nice to see more X-people, this game plays great. Nothing revolutionary, but fun".

In a 2011 retrospective, GamePro listed the game's "strong soundtrack, unlimited powers and a focus on combat rather than platforming," as well as the fact that the levels can be beaten in any order, among its strong features, but criticised a "fairly limited" moveset of the characters. According to a GameFan retrospective, "fans of the franchise and of the genre it represents here will be equally impressed with what is on offer." They specified the impressive visuals, tight gameplay, and perfectly balanced difficulty.

In 2013, Nerdist included X-Men: Mutant Apocalypse among the top ten most iconic Marvel video games, calling it "extraordinary for its time, with beautiful visuals and far more accessible game play than its Sega Genesis counterpart." That same year, this "pretty damn good" side-scrolling action game was also ranked as the 20th best Marvel video game by Geek Magazine. IGN ranked the game 78th on their "Top 100 SNES Games of All Time".
