= X-Men: The Ravages of Apocalypse =

1997 video game

- Developer: Zero Gravity Entertainment
- Publishers: WizardWorks, MacSoft
- Composer: Method of the W.O.R.M
- Engine: Quake engine
- Platforms: DOS, Windows, Linux, Macintosh
- Release: NA: December 5, 1997
- Genre: First-person shooter
- Modes: Single-player, multiplayer

X-Men: The Ravages of Apocalypse is a first-person shooter video game developed by Zero Gravity Entertainment and released for PC in 1997. The game was built with the Quake engine and requires the original version of Quake to be played. (Note: However, the game mod can be played with a GPL Quake Content such as Open Quartz, that fills the gaps between the source port and game mod files that X-Men: The Ravages of Apocalypse needs to be played.) As the result, the game acts as an expansion of Quake.

== Gameplay ==
The Ravages of Apocalypse features fourteen levels, replaces the original Quake weapons with new designs, and all of the enemies in the game have been replaced with cyborg clones of popular X-Men characters, each with their own super powers; for example, Wolverine has his healing factor, Archangel is immune to rockets, etc. X-Men: The Ravages of Apocalypse was one of the first total conversions to feature a high-profile property.

== Release ==
X-Men: The Ravages of Apocalypse was released as freeware in July 2006. The game's source code was also released, but under an ambiguous license. Modifications have been made to the game to allow it to run as a standalone title. The freeware release includes a walkthrough of the game's levels, as well as a patch which adds new gameplay features and fixes glitches from the original version.

== Reception ==
Reception

Review scores
Publication	Score
AllGame	4/5
Computer Games Strategy Plus	2.5/5
Computer Gaming World	2.5/5
Game Players	8.0/10
GameSpot	4.9/10
PC Zone	58%

X-Men: The Ravages of Apocalypse was met with generally negative reviews. Geoff Stratton of Computer Games Strategy Plus called it "an uneven product whose generally unoriginal gameplay isn't consistent with its superhero mythmaking or humorously overwrought comic-book repartee." In Computer Gaming World, Martin E. Cirulis concurred: "there just isn't enough here to justify calling this a 'superhero game'." He elaborated that while the X-Men are given strong, interesting interpretations in the Quake engine, the player character is dull and the overall game lacks the feel of an X-Men license. GamePro railed against the plain, boring level designs, lack of personality in the X-Men clones, uninspired weapons, and the fact that the X-Men themselves are only playable in multiplayer mode. They gave it a 2.5 out of 5 in both graphics and funfactor, a 3.0 in sound, and a 3.5 in control, and suggested gamers "just stick with regular Quake." GameSpot criticized the choppy animation and found the game unreasonably difficult, primarily due to the clumsy and underpowered weapons, which are difficult to use, have frustrating pauses in between bursts of fire, and require numerous dead-on hits to kill a single opponent. The reviewer concluded that players wanting a Quake expansion would be better off getting Scourge of Armagon or Dissolution of Eternity. Likewise, PC Zone told readers to go elsewhere, "if you want to keep Quake alive, get a modem. Failing that, get Malice."

== See also ==
- List of video games derived from mods
