= X-Men: Mutant Wars =

2000 video game

- North American cover art
- Developer: Hal Corp./AVIT
- Publisher: Activision Publishing, Inc.
- Director: Hiroyuki Sekimoto
- Producer: Kouji Kai
- Composer: Kazuo Sawa
- Platform: Game Boy Color
- Release: NA: November 10, 2000; EU: November 17, 2000
- Genre: Action
- Mode: Single-player

X-Men: Mutant Wars is a side-scrolling beat 'em up game for Game Boy Color released in 2000. It is the second X-Men titled released for the system. It was released to coincide with the release of the X-Men film on DVD.

X-Men: Mutant Wars was followed by a sequel in 2001 titled X-Men: Wolverine's Rage.

== Plot ==
A band of cyborgs is terrorizing the planet. Believing that Magneto is controlling the cyborgs, the X-Men try to defeat him. The player can take control of Wolverine, Storm, Cyclops, Iceman, and Gambit as they prepare for the battle to save the planet.

== Gameplay ==
Characters can be changed at any time during the game, which is important as their power level decreases through the game. When the player changes character, those are not being controlled will gradually recover their power level. Also, some areas can only be completed by using the unique abilities of certain characters.

An alternate game mode has the player facing all the boss characters from the main game, and if the current character runs out of power, they cannot be used again.

The game's bosses include: Sabretooth, Waraxe, Specter, Shadow, Sentinel, Mystique, Magneto, System A, and Apocalypse II.

== Reception ==
Reception

Aggregate score
| Aggregator | Score |
|---|---|
| GameRankings | 49.50% |

Review scores
| Publication | Score |
|---|---|
| AllGame | 1.5/5 |
| Electronic Gaming Monthly | 3.5/10 |
| GameSpot | 4.7/10 |
| IGN | 5/10 |

The game so far has a score of 49.50% on GameRankings. Some critics say it was better than X-Men: Mutant Academy on the Game Boy Color. However, many criticized the game for its frustrating controls and long boss battles. Despite the criticism, some praised the soundtrack.
