= X-Men 2: Clone Wars =

1995 video game

- North American cover art
- Developer: HeadGames
- Publisher: Sega
- Producers: E. Ettore Annunziata; France M. Tantiado
- Designers: William Novak; Joshua Gordon; Stephen Patterson
- Artists: Steve Ross; Spencer Boomhower; Doug Nishimura
- Composer: Kurt Harland
- Series: X-Men
- Platform: Mega Drive/Genesis
- Release: NA: 1995; EU: April 1995
- Genre: Platform
- Modes: Single-player, multiplayer

X-Men 2: Clone Wars is a 1995 2D action-platformer video game developed by HeadGames and released by Sega for the Mega Drive/Genesis as a sequel to the 1993's X-Men. The game is based on the adventures of the Marvel Comics superhero team, the X-Men. A sequel, titled X-Women, was cancelled.

== Gameplay ==
Gameplay screenshot with Psylocke

The game begins with a cold open; upon booting up the console, the first stage begins with the player character being randomly selected from the roster. Completing the first stage prompts the appearance of the title sequence and opening narration.

In most stages, the player must traverse environments populated with enemies and hazards and reach the exit. Some stages require the player to fight and defeat a boss enemy to proceed; minor boss fights occur at the end of the stage, while major boss fights comprise stages in their entirety.

Each playable character has a suite of basic melee attacks with ground and aerial variations, and a "mutant attack power" which typically takes the form of a ranged attack. Each character has a health bar which maxes out at 10 hit points; while at 9 or more hit points, the character's mutant attack power becomes more powerful. The player can restore their character's hit points by collecting health pickups scattered throughout stages.

Some characters can unleash charged-up versions of their mutant attack powers which deal more damage and/or have a wider area of effect, with the drawback that the character must remain stationary while charging. Some characters also have additional traversal options such as wall-jumping, climbing walls and ceilings, or flight. Some shortcuts and health pickups can only be collected by characters possessing the appropriate traversal abilities.

Whenever the player completes a stage or loses a life, they can change their current character to any available playable character. Every stage can be completed by any playable character, but each stage's layout and unique challenges often cater to certain characters' strengths while being more difficult for others, incentivizing the player to switch characters often. The player begins play with nine lives, with no way to earn more lives or continues. If the player loses all their lives and gets a game over, all progress is lost and the player must restart the game from the beginning.

== Plot ==
The game is based on the current story arc from the comics at the time of development. The plot is narrated through the Cerebro and Professor X's communication with each other. Cerebro detects that the technorganic alien race known as the Phalanx have returned and have contaminated a sentinel manufacturing facility. Learning this, Professor X sends the X-Men (Beast, Psylocke, Gambit, Nightcrawler, Wolverine, and Cyclops) to destroy the Phalanx virus, but discovers that the virus has spread to Avalon, home of Exodus and Magneto. Magneto then allies with the X-Men in preventing the Phalanx from taking control of Earth by assimilating all of its inhabitants. They trace the Phalanx to Apocalypse's facility, where he has allowed the virus to spread. After defeating him, they leave to the Savage Land where they defeat a Phalanx clone of Brainchild who was overseeing the assimilation. They continue to the Phalanx ship where they are attacked by Deathbird, and then proceed to the clone factory and the Nexus before confronting Phalanx clones of themselves.

== Characters ==
- Beast - Beast possesses acrobatic abilities; including clinging to walls, a powerful diving attack and can also perform a strong normal attack.
- Cyclops - Cyclops' optic blast can be charged to become stronger and can damage several of his enemies; in addition; he can use a small array of martial arts attacks, such as combo punches and a flying kick in melee.
- Gambit - Gambit's mutant power is a fast ranged attack that can be charged to both do more damage and fire several cards. Gambit's melee attacks are similar to Cyclops', but with greater range.
- Nightcrawler - Nightcrawler's mutant power is an explosive teleportation that can be charged for greater range and damage; allows him to move quickly from one spot to another. His strength is in acrobatic movements, including wall-crawling, double-jumping and diving attacks.
- Psylocke - Psylocke can utilize a psychic knife attack and is also equipped with a katana for use against all her enemies. She can cling to walls, do a crouching slide, double jump, and perform both a flying lunge with her psychic knife, and a 360-jumping attack with her sword.
- Wolverine - Wolverine's mutant power is a lunge with his claws, with an additional power in his regeneration powers, allowing him to restore a small amount of health. He can also scale walls by using his claws as pitons and perform a double jump.
- Magneto (unlockable after the third level) - Magneto is unique in having no melee attacks – his basic attack consists of a limitless barrage of energy blasts and his mutant power is an explosive electromagnetic orb that can traverse walls. He can also hover in mid-air and perform attacks from this position.

== Release ==
X-Men 2 was one of several games released for the Genesis in 1995 in a paper box rather than the standard clamshell case. The European release of the game reused the same cover art as X-Men 2: Game Master's Legacy for the Game Gear, a different and unrelated game. The game was given a KA (Kids to Adults) rating by the Entertainment Software Rating Board.

The game's music was composed by Kurt Harland, of electronica band Information Society. A soundtrack album was released in 1996. Some levels featured different soundtrack elements depending on the character selected although the basic structure of the level's musical theme remained the same.

== Reception ==
Reception

Aggregate score
Aggregator	Score
GameRankings	70.00%

Review scores
Publication	Score
AllGame	4/5
Electronic Gaming Monthly	6.8/10
Next Generation	2/5
Game Players	76%
Mean Machines Sega	87%
Mega Force	86%
Player One	89%
VideoGames	8/10

X-Men 2: Clone Wars was met with mostly mixed reviews. GamePro remarked that the sound effects and music are a mixed bag, and criticized the two-player mode's tight scrolling, but praised the large sprites and the special abilities of the player characters. Electronic Gaming Monthly also complimented the characters' special abilities but criticized that the game is little different from the original X-Men and suffers from a number of weak points, and concluded that "the game never seems to come alive, despite a few cool (not to mention huge) bosses and challenging levels". GameFan's Takahara found the graphics, cinematic intro, and the need to match each character's unique abilities to each stage to all be impressive, though he rated the music as "average". A reviewer for Next Generation remarked that the game has more playable characters, more complex moves, more levels, and more gameplay twists than the original X-Men, but is still no more than a rental title.

According to a retrospective review in GameFan, "in short, Clone Wars is everything Uncanny X-Men was not: nice to look at with its well-animated 16-bit characters and multi-layer backgrounds, easy to pick up and play thanks to good controls and an easily understood interface; a story that is fine for one player but more fun with two", adding, X-Men "ranks among the best comic book games produced in the era". Complex ranked X-Men 2 as the 18th best game on the Sega Genesis, adding that "the game achieved the rarely seen balanced gaming". It was also ranked as the 20th top Genesis game by ScrewAttack, who noted it for having in their opinion the best soundtrack on the system. X-Men 2 placed 19th on the 2013 list of best Marvel video games by Geek Magazine, who stated that "the soundtrack was just as good as Mutant Apocalypse, and each stage was ripe with cool nods to the comics".

== X-Women ==
A sequel featuring only the female members of the X-Men had been in development by Sega for the same platform, and was due out in early 1997, but was cancelled.
