= The Uncanny X-Men (video game) =

1989 video game

- Publisher: LJN
- Series: X-Men
- Platform: Nintendo Entertainment System
- Release: NA: December 1989
- Genres: Action, platform
- Modes: Single-player, co-op

The Uncanny X-Men, sometimes referred to as Marvel's X-Men, is a 1989 action-platform video game released by LJN for the Nintendo Entertainment System. It is a licensed game based on the series of X-Men comics of the same name by Marvel Comics. The lineup of characters in the game is very close to those appearing in the 1989 animated pilot X-Men: Pryde of the X-Men. It is the second-to-last game to be released under the Enteractive Video Games label and the last to be released before LJN was sold to Acclaim Entertainment.

== Gameplay ==
Fighting against robots in the Future City Street Fight level

The object is to use several X-Men characters, each with special powers, to complete a series of missions. The powers of each character come in handy on particular missions. The game allows for either one or two players. If the 1-Player mode is selected, the player will be joined by an AI ally. The playable characters available are Wolverine, Cyclops, Storm, Colossus, Nightcrawler, and Iceman. There are five bosses in order of appearance: Boomerang, Sabretooth, Juggernaut, the White Queen, and Magneto. Some characters have features that stand out. Wolverine, Nightcrawler, and Colossus fight through melee combat while Cyclops, Storm, and Iceman shoot projectiles. Nightcrawler can walk through walls (to simulate teleporting). Colossus cannot jump like the other characters. If the player holds on to B, they can make Storm fly.

Each character has an unlimited attack (either a punch or some type of projectile) and a special move that uses his/her energy and would kill the character if it was used up too much. The game required the players to fight their way to the boss in each stage, sometimes requiring the collection of items such as keys. After the boss is defeated, the heroes have to quickly fight their way back to the beginning of the level before a bomb goes off. There are five missions: "Practice", "Future City Street Fight", "Search And Destroy The Robot Factory", "Subterranean Confrontation", and "Battle Through A Living Starship".

A sixth mission where the player battles Magneto can be accessed after the first five levels have been completed; to access the level the player must press Select, B, up on the control pad, and Start simultaneously on the game's level selection screen. This button combination is printed on the cartridge label, but not in its entirety. This is because the creators originally meant for parts of the text displayed at the end of each level to provide the player with the missing part of the code, as well as instruct him/her to combine the revealed information with the label on the cartridge to discover the full code.

== Reception ==
Seanbaby listed X-Men as number 3 on his worst NES games of all time, criticizing the inaccurate depiction of the characters, the characters themselves, and the poor partner AI. Skyler Miller at Allgame gave the game one star out of five, calling it a "strange, laughably bad mess of a game" and even went as far as calling it "one of the worst games ever produced".
