= X-Men II: The Fall of the Mutants =

1990 video game

- Developer(s): Paragon Software
- Publisher(s): Paragon Software
- Platform(s): MS-DOS
- Release: NA: 1990
- Genre(s): Action-adventure
- Mode(s): Single-player, multiplayer

X-Men II: Fall of the Mutants is an action-adventure game for MS-DOS compatible operating systems developed and released by Paragon Software in 1990. It follows the story of the X-Men crossover storyline "Fall of the Mutants". The game is the sequel to Paragon's 1989 X-Men: Madness in Murderworld.

== Plot ==
The X-Men have come looking for their allies Storm and Forge, only to run into Freedom Force, who have been sent to capture them. Both teams are caught in a time warp caused by the Adversary, a powerful entity who has imprisoned Storm and Forge. Uatu the Watcher appears at the beginning and introduces the game as a parallel universe's version of the story from the "real" Marvel timeline in the vein of Marvel's What If? series, in this case, "What if a different team of heroes fought the Adversary?"

== Gameplay ==
The game uses an overhead view during normal play as characters move around the map, as they look for enemies, health crates, and traps. When the X-Men encounter an enemy, the game switches to a side view close-up during the battle scenes. In each level the object is to search for a pair of Freedom Force members and defeat them in battle, but only the defeat of one villain will send the player's team to the next level. After completing enough levels the heroes are thrust into battle with the Adversary himself.
