= Spider-Man and the X-Men in Arcade's Revenge =

1992 video game

- Super NES cover art by John Romita
- Developers: Software Creations; Unexpected Development (Game Boy)
- Publishers: LJN (Super NES, Game Boy); Flying Edge (Genesis, Game Gear)
- Composers: Tim Follin; Geoff Follin
- Series: Spider-Man; X-Men
- Platforms: Super NES, Mega Drive/Genesis, Game Gear, Game Boy
- Release: November 1992: Super NES; NA: November 1992; PAL: August 19, 1993; BR: December 1993 Mega Drive/Genesis; PAL: October 1993; NA: 1993 Game Gear; NA: March 1994 Game Boy; NA: 1994; PAL: 1994
- Genres: Action, platform
- Mode: Single-player

Spider-Man and the X-Men in Arcade's Revenge is a video game released for the Super NES in 1992 by LJN. It was released for the Genesis and Game Gear (under the Flying Edge brand) as well as the Game Boy. The game features Marvel Comics characters Spider-Man and the X-Men as they battle their captor, the villainous Arcade, to escape his death trap, Murderworld.

== Gameplay ==
While swinging his web throughout the city, Spider-Man notices the disappearances of X-Men Cyclops, Storm, and Wolverine; he then notices a tube from a garbage truck sucking up Gambit, and after figuring out it's Arcade, swings his web to the truck. He tracks Arcade down to an abandoned building, which is the location of the first stage; the player portrays Spider-Man de-activating "Security Eyes" in a set order (as indicated by the Spider-Sense) to enter. Inside, Spider-Man and the X-Men are placed in the deadly games of Murderworld, a simulated program designed by Arcade to torture and kill his victims. The player must successfully complete each Marvel hero's two "events" in order to get to control Spider-Man in a final battle with Arcade and escape. While any character's first event can be selected at the player's will, the second event is not playable until the completion of the first. All the heroes have the same lives, meaning if one hero loses a life, the others do as well.

== Development and release ==
Spider-Man and the X-Men in Arcade's Revenge was released in 1992 for multiple platforms, including the Super Nintendo Entertainment System (SNES) and the Sega Genesis. The development of the game was influenced by the popularity of the X-Men animated series, which was airing at the time, and LJN's desire to capitalize on the success of previous Spider-Man and X-Men games.

All four versions of the game were re-released as part of the compilation Marvel MaXimum Collection in 2026.

== Reception ==
Reception

Aggregate score
Aggregator	Score
GameRankings	70.17% (SNES)

Review scores
Publication	Score
AllGame	SGG: 2/5
Aktueller Software Markt	SNES: 7/12
Computer and Video Games	GB: 60/100; SGG: 88/100; SNES: 81/100
Electronic Gaming Monthly	SGG: 6/10 (Note: Electronic Gaming Monthly's review of the Game Gear port was by five critics with different ratings; three gave it a 6/10, one 5/10, another 7/10.); SNES: 6.75/10 (Note: Electronic Gaming Monthly's review of the SNES version was by four critics that scored it differently; two rated it 6/10, one 7/10, another 8/10.)
GameFan	SNES: 90%
GamePro	GB: 3.125/5 (Note: GamePro scored the Game Boy port two 3/5 scores for sound and fun factor, 2.5/5 for control, and 4/5 for graphics.); SGG: 3.25/5 (Note: GamePro scored the Game Gear port two 3.5/5 scores for graphics and sound, and two 3/5 scores for control and fun factor.); SMD: 4.75/5 (Note: GamePro scored the Mega Drive version 5/5 twice for control and fun factor, and 4.5/5 twice for graphics and sound.)
GameZone	SNES: 90/100
Hyper	SMD & SNES: 62%
Joypad	SMD: 84%
Mean Machines Sega	SGG: 89/100; SMD: 78/100
Nintendo Power	GB: 3.15/5 (Note: Nintendo Power scored the Game Boy port 3.5/5 for graphics/sound, 2.8/5 for play control, 3.3/5 for challenge, and 3/5 for theme/fun.); SNES: 3.55/5 (Note: Nintendo Power scored the SNES version 3.8/5 twice for graphics/sound and theme/fun, 3.2/5 for play control, and 3.4/5 for challenge.)
Official Nintendo Magazine	SNES: 89/100
Super Play	SNES: 72%
Video Games (DE)	GB: 46% SNES: 63%
Game Players	SNES: 6/10
N-Force	SNES: 75/100
Play Time	SNES: 78%
Sega Magazine	SGG: 51/100

Reviewing the Game Boy version, GamePro commented the graphics are good but the controls are frustratingly imprecise and complained of the fact that players must re-solve the tedious level 1 maze every time they start the game. They gave the Game Gear version a negative review as well, saying it retains the problems of the Game Boy version. Electronic Gaming Monthly gave the Game Gear version a 6 out of 10, praising the ability to play as multiple different characters but criticizing the difficulty as overly high. Brett Alan Weiss of AllGame criticized the Game Gear version for "awkward" controls, particularly of Spider-Man and its weak portrayals of the superheroes. Super Gamer reviewed the SNES version and gave an overall score of 75% stating: "A whole host of superheroes make this attractive for any comics fan. Gameplay is varied and tough, graphics impressive and sound brilliant".
