= X-Men (1993 video game) =

- Developer: Western Technologies
- Publisher: Sega
- Producer: E. Ettore Annuziata
- Designers: Bruce Straley; Jeff Fort; Steven Ross; Mira Ross
- Programmers: Jeff Fort; Ray Fredricks; John Bojorquez; Alan Wise
- Artists: Bruce Straley; Mira Ross; Steven Ross
- Composer: Fletcher Beasley
- Platform: Sega Genesis
- Release: NA: March 15, 1993; EU: June 1993
- Genres: Action, platform
- Modes: Single-player, multiplayer

X-Men is a home console video game produced by Sega for Sega Genesis in 1993, based on the adventures of the Marvel Comics superhero team, the X-Men. One or two players can play as any of four pre-chosen X-Men. X-Men was released in 1993 and was followed up by X-Men 2: Clone Wars.

== Plot ==
According to the game manual, the game takes place in the Danger Room, a training area for the X-Men inside the X-Mansion. A virus transmitted via satellite has infected the Danger Room, disabling control and safety limits. The X-Men must endure the unpredictable behavior of the Danger Room until the virus can be located and eliminated. Once the virus is eliminated, the X-Men discover that Magneto is behind the computer virus and the final stage involves a battle with him.

== Gameplay ==
Gambit, Nightcrawler, Wolverine, and Cyclops are available to play. Each character can jump and use various unlimited weapons (i.e. punch, kick) and a superpower which has a usefulness limited by a mutant power bar similar to a life meter, making the player rely more on standard attacks. The mutant power bar would slowly regenerate when depleted and when switching characters in mid-game, would revert to the status of the next character's mutant power bar from the last use (characters yet to be used would start off with a standard full bar of mutant power).

=== Playable characters ===
- Wolverine: Uses retractable claws which enhance the strength of his basic punches and allows him to execute special mid-air attacks. As in other X-Men games, he possesses a healing factor that enables the character to recover from injury (i.e. replenish the life bar).
- Gambit: Uses his trademark bo staff as a weapon. His charged cards track enemies.
- Cyclops: A to use your rebounding optic blasts, B to punch, Down+B to crouch punch, C+B to do a flying kick, C+C to do a spin jump, C+C (rapidly) to do a super high jump and C+C+A to do an optic blast spin attack.
- Nightcrawler: Uses a teleportation ability which can skip many areas or transport a secondary character.

=== Other characters ===
Other X-Men such as Storm, Rogue, Iceman, and Archangel can be called upon for support. Jean Grey also appears as support to pick up characters who fall. Sauron can be seen as cameo at the near end of first level, ironically helping the player inflight. There are several levels, most having boss fights with familiar X-Men villains.

=== Soundtrack ===
All of the music in the game was composed by Fletcher Beasley using the G.E.M.S. system (Genesis Editor for Music and Sound Effects), which could communicate with the Yamaha 2612 FM synthesizer chip on the Sega Genesis and could be used to directly play back the sounds through the Genesis.

== Reception ==
The game sold over a million copies.

In 2011, IGN named the game in its "Fifteen Really, Really, Really Hard Games" list, citing "unfairly placed enemies, ridiculously annoying jumps and near-impossible-to-beat bosses", as well as the need to lightly press the Genesis' reset button in "Mojo's Crunch". The requirement to reset effectively means the game cannot be completed on a Genesis Nomad. Power Unlimited gave X-Men a score of 82% writing: "X-Men for the Megadrive is a platform game with an original approach. It's basically a platform, tactics, fighting and strategy game all in one. The game is therefore extremely extensive and varied. A true must for superhero fans."

The game was ranked number 7 on GameTrailers' "Top 10 X-Men Games" list.
