= List of highest-grossing films =

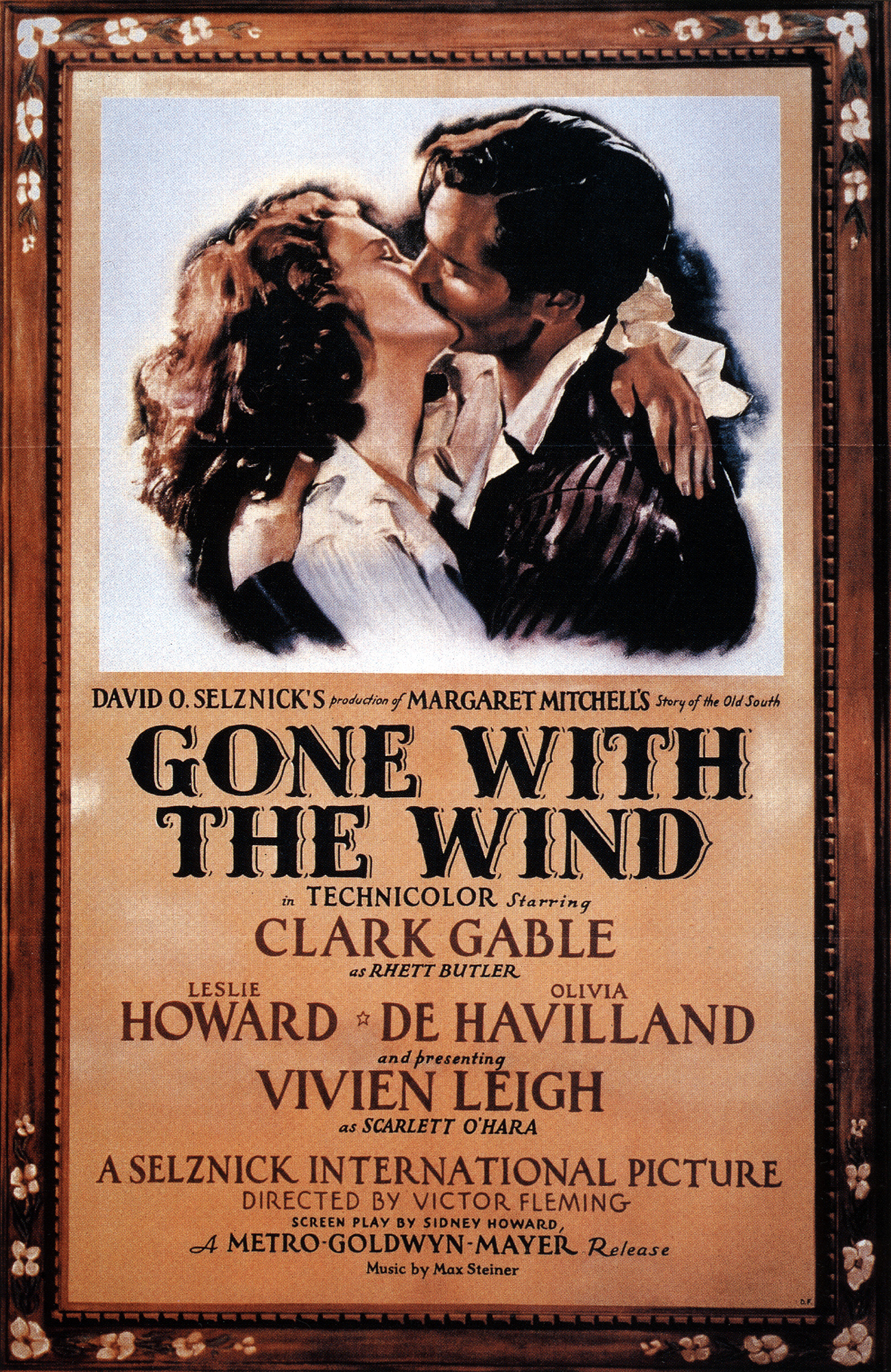
Gone with the Wind held the record for the highest-grossing film for twenty-five years and, when adjusted for inflation, has earned more than any other film.

Films generate income from several revenue streams, including theatrical exhibition, home video, television broadcast rights, and merchandising. However, theatrical box-office earnings are the primary metric for trade publications in assessing the success of a film, mostly because of the availability of the data compared to sales figures for home video and broadcast rights, but also because of historical practice. Included on the list are charts of the top box-office earners (ranked by both the nominal and real value of their revenue), a chart of high-grossing films by calendar year, a timeline showing the transition of the highest-grossing film record, and a chart of the highest-grossing film franchises and series. All charts are ranked by international theatrical box-office performance where possible, excluding income derived from home video, broadcasting rights, and merchandise.

Traditionally, war films, musicals, and historical dramas have been the most popular genres, but franchise films have been among the best performers of the 21st century. There is strong interest in the superhero genre, with eleven films in the Marvel Cinematic Universe featuring among the nominal top-earners. The most successful superhero film, Avengers: Endgame, is also the highest-grossing film on the nominal earnings chart, and there are four films in total based on the Avengers comic books charting in the top twenty-five. Other Marvel Comics adaptations have also had success with the Spider-Man and X-Men properties, while films based on Batman and Superman from DC Comics have generally performed well. Beyond the superhero genre, Star Wars, with four films, is the most represented franchise in the nominal earnings chart. Avatar, in second place on the nominal chart, is the highest-grossing film that is not a sequel or an adaptation of a pre-existing property. Animated family films have performed consistently well, with Disney films enjoying lucrative re-releases prior to the home-video era. Disney also enjoyed later success with films such as Frozen and its sequel, Zootopia and its sequel, and The Lion King (along with its computer-animated remake), as well as its Pixar division, of which Inside Out 2, Incredibles 2, and Toy Story 3, 4 and 5 have been the best performers. Beyond Disney and Pixar animation, China's Ne Zha 2 (the highest-grossing animated film), and the Despicable Me and Shrek series have met with the most success.

While inflation has eroded the achievements of most films from the 1960s and 1970s, there are franchises originating from that period that are still active. Besides the Star Wars franchise, James Bond films are still being released periodically; both are among the highest-grossing franchises. Some of the older films that held the record of highest-grossing film still have respectable grosses by today's standards, but no longer compete numerically against today's top-earners in an era of much higher individual ticket prices. When those prices are adjusted for inflation, however, then Gone with the Wind—which was the highest-grossing film outright for twenty-five years—is still the highest-grossing film of all time. All grosses on the list are expressed in U.S. dollars at their nominal value, except where stated otherwise.

== Highest-grossing films ==
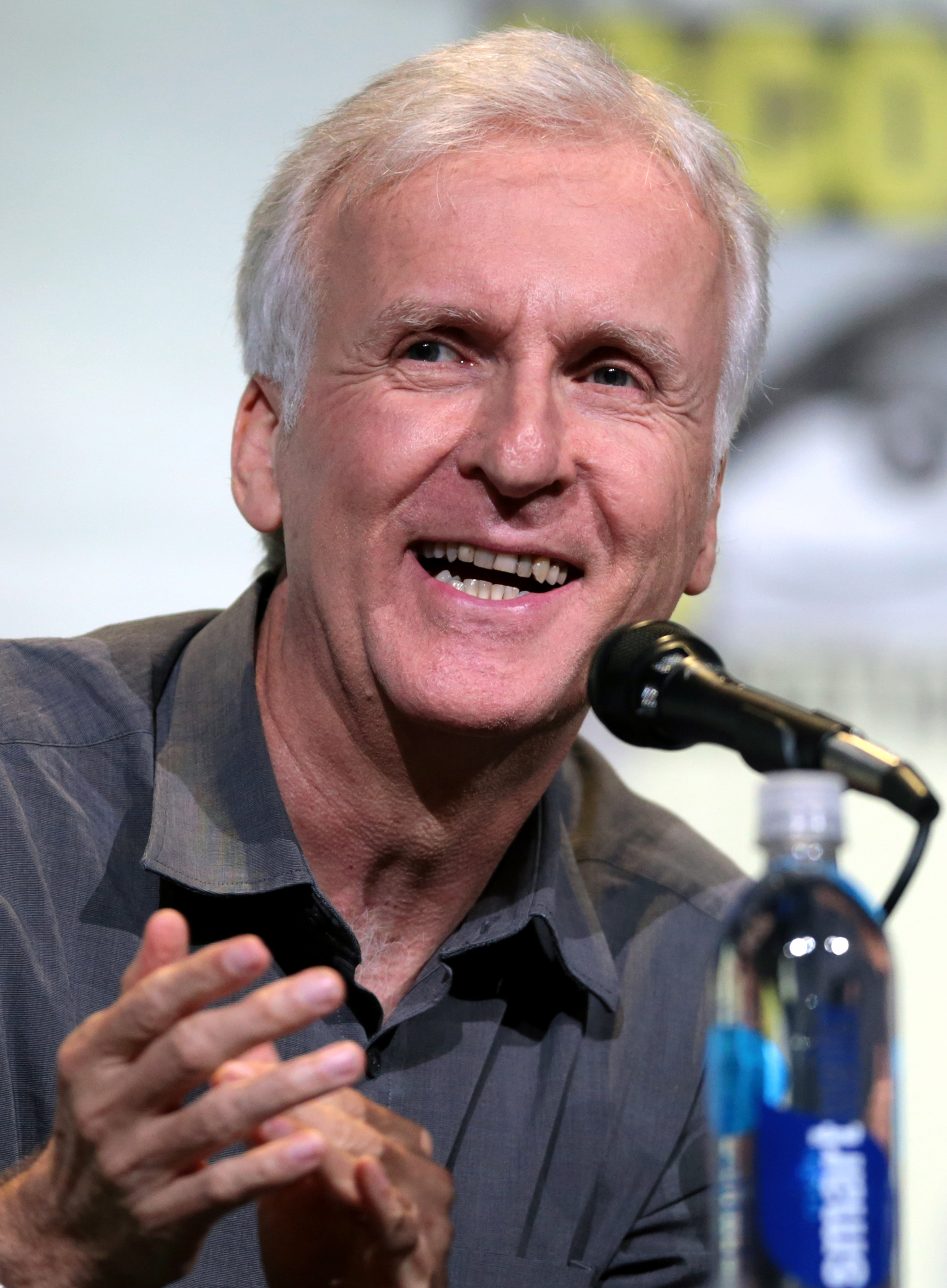
Three of the five highest-grossing films were written and directed by James Cameron.

With a worldwide box-office gross of over $2.9 billion, Avengers: Endgame is proclaimed to be the "highest-grossing" film, but such claims usually refer to theatrical revenues only and do not take into account home video and television income, which can form a significant portion of a film's earnings. Once revenue from home entertainment is factored in, it is not immediately clear which film is the most successful. Titanic earned $1.2 billion from video and DVD sales and rentals, in addition to the $2.2 billion it grossed in theaters. While complete sales data are not available for Avatar, it earned $345 million from the sale of sixteen million DVD and Blu-ray units in North America, and ultimately sold a total of thirty million DVD and Blu-ray units worldwide. After home video income is accounted for, both films have earned over $3 billion each. Television broadcast rights also substantially add to a film's earnings and, as of 2010, a film often earned the equivalent of as much as 20–25% of its theatrical box office for two television runs, on top of pay-per-view revenues; Titanic earned a further $55 million from the NBC and HBO broadcast rights, equating to about 9% of its North American gross.

When a film is highly exploitable as a commercial property, its ancillary revenues can dwarf its income from direct film sales. The Lion King (1994) earned over $2 billion in box-office and home video sales, but this pales in comparison to the $8 billion earned at box offices around the world by the stage adaptation. Merchandising can be extremely lucrative too: The Lion King also sold $3 billion of merchandise, while Pixar's Cars—which originally earned $462 million in theatrical revenues and was only a modest hit by comparison to other Pixar films—generated global merchandise sales of over $8 billion in the five years after its 2006 release. Pixar had another huge hit with Toy Story 3, which generated almost $10 billion in merchandise retail sales in addition to the $1 billion it earned at the box office.

On this chart, films are ranked by the revenues from theatrical exhibition at their nominal value, along with the highest positions they attained. Eight films in total have grossed in excess of $2 billion worldwide, with Avengers: Endgame ranked in the top position. All of the films have had a theatrical run (including re-releases) in the 21st century, and films that have not played during this period do not appear on the chart because of ticket-price inflation, population size and ticket purchasing trends not being considered.

† Background shading indicates films playing in the week commencing 20 November 2026 in theaters around the world.

Highest-grossing films
Rank	Peak	Title	Worldwide gross	Year	Ref
1	1	Avengers: Endgame †	$2,942,661,253	2019	
2	1	Avatar	$2,923,710,708	2009	
3	3	Spider-Man: Brand New Day †	$2,523,728,253	2026	
4	3	Avatar: The Way of Water	$2,334,484,620	2022	
5	1	Titanic	^{T}$2,257,906,828	1997	(Note: Titanic: Pre-2020 releases: "Titanic (1997)". Box Office Mojo. Archived from the original on October 27, 2019. "Worldwide: $2,187,615,730; Original release: $1,843,373,318; 2012 3D Release: $343,550,770; 2017 Re-release: $691,642"; 2020 Re-release: "Titanic (2020 Re-release)". Box Office Mojo. "2020 Re-release: $71,352"; 2023 Re-release: "Titanic (25 Year Anniversary)". Box Office Mojo. "2023 Re-release: $70,219,746")
6	5	Ne Zha 2	^{NZ}$2,217,758,382	2025	
7	3	Star Wars: The Force Awakens	$2,068,223,624	2015	
8	4	Avengers: Infinity War	$2,048,359,754	2018	
9	6	Spider-Man: No Way Home	^{SM}$1,922,598,800	2021	
10	9	Zootopia 2	$1,870,309,291	2025	
11	11	The Odyssey †	$1,805,368,479	2026	
12	8	Inside Out 2	$1,698,863,816	2024	
13	3	Jurassic World	$1,671,537,444	2015	
14	7	The Lion King	$1,656,943,394	2019	
15	3	The Avengers	$1,518,815,515	2012	
16	4	Furious 7	$1,515,341,399	2015	
17	11	Top Gun: Maverick	$1,503,260,455	2022	
18	16	Avatar: Fire and Ash	$1,485,999,890	2025	
19	10	Frozen 2	$1,450,026,933	2019	
20	14	Barbie	$1,447,138,421	2023	
21	5	Avengers: Age of Ultron	$1,402,809,540	2015	
22	15	The Super Mario Bros. Movie	$1,360,783,214	2023	
23	9	Black Panther	$1,347,280,838	2018	
24	3	Harry Potter and the Deathly Hallows – Part 2	$1,342,139,727	2011	(Note: Harry Potter and the Deathly Hallows – Part 2: Total: "Harry Potter and the Deathly Hallows Part 2 (2011)". Box Office Mojo.; Production cost: Frankel, Daniel (November 17, 2010). "Get Ready for the Biggest 'Potter' Opening Yet". The Wrap. Archived from the original on November 20, 2010.)
25	20	Deadpool & Wolverine	$1,338,073,645	2024	
26	9	Star Wars: The Last Jedi	$1,332,539,889	2017	
27	12	Jurassic World: Fallen Kingdom	$1,308,476,166	2018	
28	5	Frozen	^{F}$1,290,000,000	2013	(Note: Frozen: "Frozen (2013) – International Box Office Results". Box Office Mojo. Archived from the original on August 9, 2014. "Worldwide – $1,274,219,009 (total as of August 8, 2014; including Japanese gross up to August 3, Spanish gross up to July 27, UK gross up to June 8, German gross up to March 30, and omitting Nigerian gross)"; "Frozen (2013) – International Box Office Results: Japan". Box Office Mojo.; Total as of August 3, 2014: $247,650,477 Total as of August 31, 2014: $249,036,646: "Frozen (2013) – International Box Office Results: Nigeria". Box Office Mojo.; Total as of August 17, 2014: $167,333: "Frozen (2013) – International Box Office Results: Spain". Box Office Mojo.; Total as of July 27, 2014: $21,668,593 Total as of November 2, 2014: $22,492,845: "Frozen (2013) – International Box Office Results: United Kingdom". Box Office Mojo.; Total as of June 8, 2014: £39,090,985 Total as of November 30, 2014: £40,960,083 ($1 = £0.63866) Total as of December 7, 2014: £41,087,765 ($1 = £0.64136) Total as of December 14, 2014: £41,170,608 ($1 = £0.636) Total as of November 26, 2017: £42,840,559 ($1 = £0.7497) Total as of December 3, 2017: £42,976,318 ($1 = £0.742): "Frozen (2013) – International Box Office Results: Germany". Box Office Mojo.; Total as of March 30, 2014: €35,098,170 Total as of October 18, 2015: €42,526,744 nb. the exact euro to dollar conversion rate is unknown for earnings since April 2014, but the euro never fell below parity with the dollar during 2014 and 2015 (as can be verified by comparing the exchange rate on the individual date entries at the provided reference) so an approximate conversion rate of €1: $1 is used here to give a lower-bound.)
29	10	Beauty and the Beast	$1,263,521,126	2017	
30	15	Incredibles 2	$1,242,805,359	2018	
31	11	The Fate of the Furious	^{F8}$1,238,764,765	2017	
32	5	Iron Man 3	$1,214,811,252	2013	
33	10	Minions	$1,159,444,662	2015	
34	12	Captain America: Civil War	$1,153,337,496	2016	
35	35	Toy Story 5 †	$1,149,545,392	2026	
36	20	Aquaman	$1,148,528,393	2018	
37	2	The Lord of the Rings: The Return of the King	$1,147,997,407	2003	
38	24^{RK}	Spider-Man: Far From Home	$1,132,679,685	2019	
39	23^{RK}	Captain Marvel	$1,128,274,794	2019	
40	5^{RK}	Transformers: Dark of the Moon	$1,123,794,079	2011	
41	7	Skyfall	$1,108,594,137	2012	
42	10	Transformers: Age of Extinction	$1,104,054,072	2014	
43^{JP}	7	The Dark Knight Rises	^{DKR}$1,081,169,825	2012	
44	31	Joker	$1,074,458,282	2019	
45	32	Star Wars: The Rise of Skywalker	$1,074,144,248	2019	
46	30	Toy Story 4	$1,073,394,593	2019	
47	4^{TS3}	Toy Story 3	$1,066,970,811	2010	
48	3	Pirates of the Caribbean: Dead Man's Chest	$1,066,185,783	2006	
49	44	Moana 2	$1,059,242,164	2024	
50	20	Rogue One: A Star Wars Story	$1,057,420,387	2016	

^{T}The totals given for Titanic at Box Office Mojo and The Numbers are both incorrect. Prior to the 2023 re-release, the totals at both trackers were inflated above the true figure.
- As of 2019, Box Office Mojo correctly recorded that Titanic had grossed a lifetime total of $2.187 billion ($1.843 billion from its original release, $344 million from its 3D reissue in 2012, and $692,000 from a limited release in 2017). Following a limited re-release in 2020, Box Office Mojo incorrectly added $7 million to the original release total. By late 2021, Box Office Mojo had corrected the original release total but added the $7 million figure to both the 2012 and 2017 reissue totals, incorrectly increasing the lifetime total by $14 million to $2.202 billion. By early 2023, Box Office Mojo corrected the total for the 2017 reissue, bringing the lifetime gross down to $2.195 billion, but retained the error in the 2012 reissue.
- The Numbers does not log individual releases, but had the lifetime total recorded as $2.186 billion in September 2014 (roughly equating to $1.843 billion for the original release and $343.6 million for the 3D reissue). A couple of weeks later, The Numbers increased the lifetime gross to $2.208 billion, without explanation.

^{NZ}The worldwide total for Ne Zha 2 at Box Office Mojo is incorrect. Box Office Mojo has altered its figure for the Chinese release several times since the film closed, and remains inconsistent (first by low-balling, then over-shooting) with the figure available from Chinese sources. The worldwide total is corrected by replacing Box Office Mojo's erroneous gross for China, with one from a Chinese source. In addition, the gross from the initial New Zealand release is omitted from the worldwide total at Box Office Mojo, so that is added back in.

^{SM}The worldwide total for Spider-Man: No Way Home at Box Office Mojo is incorrect, due to an issue in the original gross. Totals are sourced to an archived version of Box Office Mojo prior to when the error was introduced.

^{F}Box Office Mojo stopped updating its main total for Frozen in August 2014, while it was still in release. The total listed here incorporates subsequent earnings in Japan, Nigeria, Spain, the United Kingdom and Germany up to the end of 2015 but omits earnings in Turkey, Iceland, Brazil, and Australia (2016), which amount to a few hundred thousand dollars. The total is rounded to $1 million to compensate for the numerical inaccuracy. It was re-released in the United Kingdom in December 2017 with the featurette Olaf's Frozen Adventure, earning an additional $2.3 million.

^{F8}The Fate of the Furious's gross is from an archived version of Box Office Mojo, after irregularities were discovered in the current figure. Ongoing weekly drops in the totals for several countries—Argentina being the worst affected—led to a drop in the overall worldwide total. A previous figure is provided.

^{RK}The Lord of the Rings: The Return of the King saw its original gross corrected in early 2020. The result of this correction is that Spider-Man: Far From Home, Captain Marvel and Transformers: Dark of the Moon all peaked one place lower than shown in the accompanying source.

^{JP}Box Office Mojo has Jurassic Park ranked above The Dark Knight Rises on its All-Time chart, with $1.103 billion, whereas it previously recorded a gross of $1.038 billion (including re-releases). The discrepancy comes from a change in the original 1993 gross: Box Office Mojo used to record a worldwide total of $913 million, but now records a gross of $978 million. It was certainly not the first film to gross $1 billion—that honour goes to Titanic, which was widely reported at the time—so the current figure that Box Office Mojo has down must be incorrect. For that reason, the $1.038 billion figure is more likely the correct figure (or at most only a few million out) for Jurassic Park's lifetime total, which would leave it lying outside of the top fifty.

^{DKR}The worldwide total for The Dark Knight Rises at Box Office Mojo is incorrect due to double-counting the original Australian gross in its 2024 re-release total. Totals are sourced to an archived version of Box Office Mojo prior to when the error was introduced.

^{TS3}Box Office Mojo revised the grosses for Pixar films in August 2016, resulting in the gross for Toy Story 3 being corrected from $1.063 billion to $1.067 billion, meaning it peaked at number 4 at the end of its run (ahead of Pirates of the Caribbean: Dead Man's Chest) rather than at number 5 as indicated by the source.

== Highest-grossing films adjusted for inflation ==
Inflation rates around the world vary, complicating inflation adjustment

Because of the long-term effects of inflation, notably the significant increase of movie theater ticket prices, the list unadjusted for inflation gives far more weight to later films. The unadjusted list, while commonly found in the press, is therefore largely meaningless for comparing films widely separated in time, as many films from earlier eras will never appear on a modern unadjusted list, despite achieving higher commercial success when adjusted for price increases. To compensate for the devaluation of the currency, some charts make adjustments for inflation, but not even this practice fully addresses the issue, since ticket prices and inflation do not necessarily parallel one another. For example, in 1970, tickets cost $1.55 or about $6.68 in inflation-adjusted 2004 dollars; by 1980, prices had risen to about $2.69, a drop to $5.50 in inflation-adjusted 2004 dollars. Ticket prices have also risen at different rates of inflation around the world, further complicating the process of adjusting worldwide grosses.

Another complication is release in multiple formats for which different ticket prices are charged. One notable example of this phenomenon is Avatar, which was also released in 3D and IMAX: almost two-thirds of tickets for that film were for 3D showings with an average price of $10, and about one-sixth were for IMAX showings with an average price over $14.50, compared to a 2010 average price of $7.61 for 2D films. Social and economic factors such as population change and the growth of international markets also have an effect on the number of people purchasing theater tickets, along with audience demographics where some films sell a much higher proportion of discounted children's tickets, or perform better in big cities where tickets cost more.

The measuring system for gauging a film's success is based on unadjusted grosses, primarily due to historical convention: box-office receipts are compiled by theaters and relayed to the distributor, who releases them to the media. Converting to a more representative system that counts ticket sales rather than gross is also fraught with problems because the only data available for older films are the sale totals. As the motion picture industry is highly oriented towards marketing currently released films, unadjusted figures are always used in marketing campaigns so that new blockbuster films can much more easily achieve a high sales ranking, and thus be promoted as a "top film of all time", so there is little incentive to switch to a more robust analysis from a marketing or even newsworthy point of view.

Despite the inherent difficulties in accounting for inflation, several attempts have been made. Estimates depend on the price index used to adjust the grosses, and the exchange rates used to convert between currencies can also affect the calculations, both of which can have an effect on the ultimate rankings of an inflation adjusted list. Gone with the Wind—first released in 1939—is generally considered to be the most successful film, with Guinness World Records in 2014 estimating its adjusted global gross at $3.4 billion. Estimates for Gone with the Wind's adjusted gross have varied substantially: its owner, Turner Entertainment, estimated its adjusted earnings at $3.3 billion in 2007, a few years earlier than the Guinness estimate; other estimates fall either side of this amount, with one putting its gross just under $3 billion in 2010, while another provided an alternative figure of $3.8 billion in 2006. Which film is Gone with the Wind's nearest rival depends on the set of figures used: Guinness had Avatar in second place with $3 billion, while other estimates saw Titanic in the runner-up spot with first-run worldwide earnings of almost $2.9 billion at 2010 prices.

Highest-grossing films as of 2025 adjusted for inflation^{[Inf]}
Rank	Title	Worldwide gross (2025 $)	Year
1	Gone with the Wind	^{GW}$4,561,000,000	1939
2	Avatar	^{A1}$4,157,000,000	2009
3	Titanic	^{T}$3,864,000,000	1997
4	Star Wars	$3,743,000,000	1977
5	Avengers: Endgame	^{AE}$3,443,000,000	2019
6	The Sound of Music	$3,138,000,000	1965
7	E.T. the Extra-Terrestrial	^{ET}$3,065,000,000	1982
8	The Ten Commandments	$2,898,000,000	1956
9	Doctor Zhivago	$2,747,000,000	1965
10	Jaws	^{J}$2,710,000,000	1975

^{Inf}Inflation adjustment is carried out using the consumer price index for advanced economies published by the International Monetary Fund. The index is uniformly applied to the grosses in the chart published by Guinness World Records in 2014, beginning with the 2014 index. The figures in the above chart take into account inflation that has occurred in every year since then, through 2025.

^{GW}The adjusted gross for Gone with the Wind includes the original release and reissue grosses up to 1998, adjusted from the Guinness base year, and the 2019 gross adjusted from the 2020 index. There have been several limited re-releases in the 2020s, but the grosses from these reissues are not represented in the adjusted gross.

^{A1}The adjusted gross for Avatar includes revenue from the original release and all four reissues. The original release and 2010 Special Edition grosses are adjusted from the Guinness base year, whilst the 2020 and 2021 grosses are adjusted from the 2021 index and the 2022 gross from 2022.

^{T}Guinness' adjusted total for Titanic only increased by $102,000,000 between the 2012 (published in 2011) and 2015 editions, a rise of 4.2% shared by the other adjusted totals in the chart, and omitted the gross from a 3D re-release in 2012. This chart incorporates the gross of $343,550,770 from the reissue and adjusts it from the 2013 index. Titanic grossed a further $762,994 during limited re-releases in 2017 and 2020, and these have been incorporated into the gross from the 25th anniversary reissue and adjusted from the 2023 index.

^{AE}The gross for Avengers: Endgame is adjusted from the 2020 index.

^{ET}The adjusted gross for E.T. includes revenue from the original release and all re-releases. The original release along with the 1985 and 2002 reissues are adjusted from the Guinness base year, whilst the 2020 and 2022 grosses are adjusted from the 2022 index.

^{J}The adjusted gross for Jaws includes all revenue from the original release and early reissues. It also incorporates revenue from various minor re-releases between 2012 and 2024, and the 50th anniversary reissue in 2025. The later re-releases are all adjusted from the 2025 index.

== High-grossing films by year ==
Glossary: Distributor rentals

Box-office figures are reported in either gross revenue or distributor rentals, the latter being especially true of older films. Commonly mistaken for home video revenue, distributor rentals are the distributor's share of the film's theatrical revenue (i.e. the box office gross less the exhibitor's cut). Historically, the rental price averaged at 30–40% when the distributors owned the theater chains, equating to just over a third of the gross being paid to the distributor of the film. In the modern marketplace, rental fees can vary greatly—depending on a number of factors—although the films from the major studios average out at 43%.

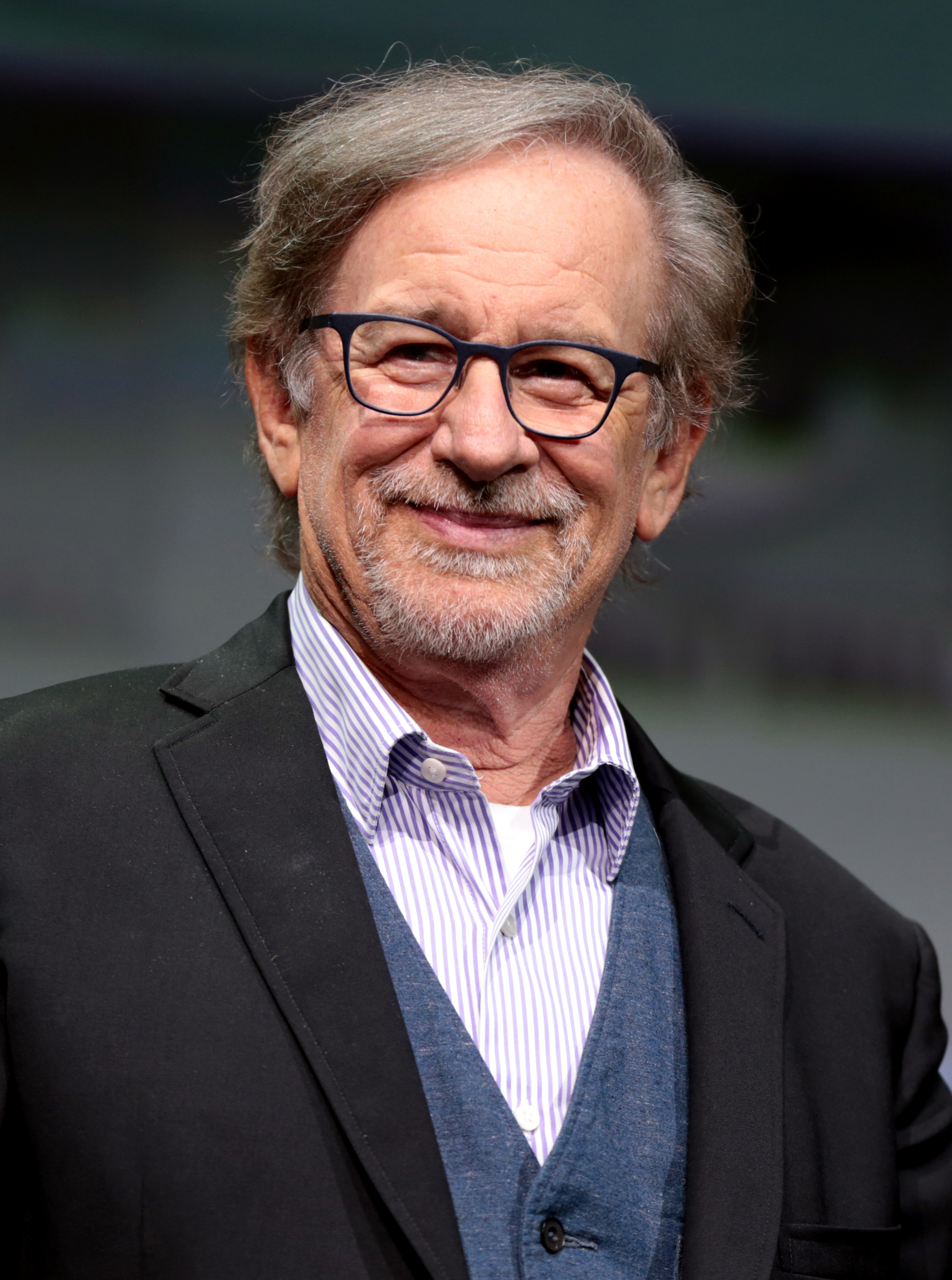
Films directed by Steven Spielberg have been the highest-grossing film of the year on five occasions, and on three occasions have been the highest-grossing film of all time.

Audience tastes were fairly eclectic during the 20th century, but several trends did emerge. During the silent era, films with war themes were popular with audiences, with The Birth of a Nation (American Civil War), The Four Horsemen of the Apocalypse, The Big Parade and Wings (all World War I) becoming the most successful films in their respective years of release, with the trend coming to an end with All Quiet on the Western Front in 1930. With the advent of sound in 1927, the musical—the genre best placed to showcase the new technology—took over as the most popular type of film with audiences, with 1928 and 1929 both being topped by musical films. The genre continued to perform strongly in the 1930s, but the outbreak of World War II saw war-themed films dominate again during this period, starting with Gone with the Wind (American Civil War) in 1939, and finishing with The Best Years of Our Lives (World War II) in 1946. Samson and Delilah (1949) saw the beginning of a trend of increasingly expensive historical dramas set during Ancient Rome/biblical times throughout the 1950s as cinema competed with television for audiences, with Quo Vadis, The Robe, The Ten Commandments, Ben-Hur and Spartacus all becoming the highest-grossing film of the year during initial release, before the genre started to wane after several high-profile failures. The success of White Christmas and South Pacific in the 1950s foreshadowed the comeback of the musical in the 1960s with West Side Story, Mary Poppins, My Fair Lady, The Sound of Music and Funny Girl all among the top films of the decade. The 1970s saw a shift in audience tastes to high concept films, with five such films made by either George Lucas or Steven Spielberg topping the chart during the 1980s. The 21st century has seen an increasing dependence on franchises and adaptations, with the box-office dominance of films based on pre-existing intellectual property at record levels.

Steven Spielberg (1975, 1981, 1982, 1989 and 1993) and Cecil B. DeMille (1932, 1947, 1949, 1952 and 1956) tie as the most represented directors on the chart with five films apiece occupying the annual top spot. William Wyler (1942, 1946, 1959 and 1968) and James Cameron (1991, 1997, 2009 and 2022) are each represented by four films, whilst D. W. Griffith (1915, 1916 and 1920), George Roy Hill (1966, 1969 and 1973) and the Russo brothers (2016, 2018 and 2019) all feature heavily with three films apiece. George Lucas directed three chart-toppers in 1977, 1999 and 2005, but also served in a strong creative capacity as a producer and writer in 1980, 1981, 1983, and 1989 as well. The following directors have also all directed two films on the chart: Frank Lloyd, King Vidor, Frank Capra, Michael Curtiz, Leo McCarey, Alfred Hitchcock, David Lean, Stanley Kubrick, Guy Hamilton, Mike Nichols, William Friedkin, Peter Jackson, Gore Verbinski, and Michael Bay; Mervyn LeRoy, Ken Annakin and Robert Wise are each represented by one solo credit and one shared credit, and John Ford co-directed two films. Disney films are usually co-directed and some directors have served on several winning teams: Wilfred Jackson, Hamilton Luske, Clyde Geronimi, David Hand, Ben Sharpsteen, Wolfgang Reitherman and Bill Roberts have all co-directed at least two films on the list. Only seven directors have topped the chart in consecutive years: McCarey (1944 and 1945), Nichols (1966 and 1967), Spielberg (1981 and 1982), Jackson (2002 and 2003), Verbinski (2006 and 2007) and the Russo brothers (2018 and 2019).

Because of release schedules—especially in the case of films released towards the end of the year—and different release patterns across the world, many films can do business in two or more calendar years; therefore the grosses documented here are not confined to just the year of release. Grosses are not limited to original theatrical runs either, with many older films often being re-released periodically so the figures represent all the business a film has done since its original release; a film's first-run gross is included in brackets after the total if known. Because of incomplete data, it cannot be known for sure how much money some films have made and when they made it, but generally the chart chronicles the films from each year that went on to earn the most. In the cases where estimates conflict both films are recorded, and in cases where a film has moved into first place because of being re-released the previous record-holder is also retained.

† Background shading indicates films playing in the week commencing 20 November 2026 in theaters around the world.

High-grossing films by year of release
Year	Title	Worldwide gross	Budget	References
1915	The Birth of a Nation	$50,000,000–100,000,000 $20,000,000+^{R} ($5,200,000)^{R}	$110,000	
1916	Intolerance	$1,750,000^{R} ^{IN}	$385,907	
1917	Cleopatra	$500,000^{*}^{R}	$300,000	(Note: Block & Wilson 2010, p. 26.: Cleopatra: "Domestic Rentals: $0.5; Production Cost: $0.3 (Unadjusted $s in Millions of $s).")
1918	Mickey	$8,000,000	$250,000	
1919	The Miracle Man	$3,000,000^{R}	$120,000	
1920	Way Down East	$5,000,000^{R} ($4,000,000)^{R}	$800,000	(Note: "Biggest Money Pictures". Variety. June 21, 1932. p. 1 – via Archive.org. Cited in "Biggest Money Pictures". Cinemaweb. Archived from the original on July 8, 2011.) (Note: Solomon, Aubrey (2011). The Fox Film Corporation, 1915–1935: A History and Filmography. McFarland & Company. ISBN 978-0-7864-6286-5.: Way Down East: p. 52. "D.W. Griffith's Way Down East (1920) was projected to return rentals of $4,000,000 on an $800,000 negative. This figure was based on the amounts earned from its roadshow run, coupled with its playoff in the rest of the country's theaters. Griffith had originally placed the potential film rental at $3,000,000 but, because of the success of the various roadshows that were running the $4,000,000 total was expected. The film showed a profit of $615,736 after just 23 weeks of release on a gross of $2,179,613."; What Price Glory?: p. 112. "What Price Glory hit the jackpot with massive world rentals of $2,429,000, the highest figure in the history of the company. Since it was also the most expensive production of the year at $817,000 the profit was still a healthy $796,000..."; Cavalcade: p. 170. "The actual cost of Cavalcade was $1,116,000 and it was most definitely not guaranteed a success. In fact, if its foreign grosses followed the usual 40 percent of domestic returns, the film would have lost money. In a turnaround, the foreign gross was almost double the $1,000,000 domestic take to reach total world rentals of $3,000,000 and Fox's largest profit of the year at $664,000."; State Fair: p. 170 . "State Fair did turn out to be a substantial hit with the help of Janet Gaynor boosting Will Rogers back to the level of money-making star. Its prestige engagements helped raked in a total $1,208,000 in domestic rentals. Surprisingly, in foreign countries unfamiliar with state fairs, it still earned a respectable $429,000. With its total rentals, the film ended up showing a $398,000 profit.")
1921	The Four Horsemen of the Apocalypse	$5,000,000^{R} ($4,000,000)^{R}	$600,000–800,000	(Note: Hall & Neale 2010, p. 53. "The Four Forsemen of the Apocalypse was to become Metro's most expensive production and one of the decade's biggest box-office hits. Its production costs have been estimated at "something between $600,000 and $800,000." Variety estimated its worldwide gross at $4 million in 1925 and at $5 million in 1944; in 1991, it estimated its cumulative domestic rentals at $3,800,000.")
1922	Douglas Fairbanks in Robin Hood	$2,500,000^{R}	$930,042.78	
1923	The Covered Wagon	$5,000,000^{R}	$800,000	(Note: Birchard, Robert S. (2009). Cecil B. DeMille's Hollywood. University Press of Kentucky. ISBN 978-0-8131-3829-9.: ch. 45. The Ten Commandments (1923). "Cost: $1,475,836.93; Gross: $4,169,798.38"; ch. 56. The Sign of the Cross. "Cost: $694,064.67; Gross: $2,738,993.35 (to 1937)"; ch. 68. Samson and Delilah. "Cost: $3,097,563.05"; ch. 69. The Greatest Show on Earth. "Cost: $3,873,946.50; Gross receipts: $15,797,396.36 (to December 29, 1962)"; ch. 70. The Ten Commandments (1956). "Cost: $13,272,381.87; Gross receipts: $90,066,230.00 (to June 23, 1979)")
1924	The Sea Hawk	$3,000,000^{R}	$700,000	
1925	The Big Parade	$18,000,000–22,000,000^{R} ($6,131,000)^{R}	$382,000	(Note: Hall & Neale 2010, pp. 58–59. "Even then, at a time when the budget for a feature averaged at around $300,000, no more than $382,000 was spent on production...According to the Eddie Mannix Ledger at MGM, it grossed $4,990,000 domestically and $1,141,000 abroad.")
1925	Ben-Hur	$10,738,000^{R} ($9,386,000)^{R}	$3,967,000	(Note: Hall & Neale 2010, p. 163. "MGM's silent Ben-Hur, which opened at the end of 1925, had out-grossed all the other pictures released by the company in 1926 combined. With worldwide rentals of $9,386,000 on first release it was, with the sole possible exception of The Birth of a Nation, the highest-earning film of the entire silent era. (At a negative cost of $3,967,000, it was also the most expensive.)")
1926	For Heaven's Sake	$2,600,000^{R} ^{FH}	$150,000	
1927	Wings	$3,600,000^{R}	$2,000,000	(Note: Finler 2003, p. 188. "At a cost of $2 million Wings was the studio's most expensive movie of the decade, and though it did well it was not good enough to earn a profit.") (Note: The Jazz Singer and The Singing Fool: Block, Hayley Taylor (2010), The Jazz Singer, p. 113, "The film brought in $2.6 million in worldwide rentals and made a net profit of $1,196,750. Jolson's follow-up Warner Bros. film, The Singing Fool (1928), brought in over two times as much, with $5.9 in worldwide rentals and a profit of $3,649,000, making them two of the most profitable films in the 1920s." In: Block & Wilson 2010.)
1928	The Singing Fool	$5,900,000^{R}	$388,000	
1929	The Broadway Melody	$4,400,000–4,800,000^{R}	$379,000	(Note: Bradley, Edwin M. (2004) [1st. pub. 1996]. The First Hollywood Musicals: A Critical Filmography of 171 Features, 1927 Through 1932. McFarland & Company. ISBN 978-0-7864-2029-2.: The Singing Fool: p. 12. "Ego aside, Jolson was at the top of his powers in The Singing Fool. The $150,000 Warner Bros. paid him to make it, and the $388,000 it took to produce the film, were drops in the hat next to the film's world gross of $5.9 million. Its $3.8-million gross in this country set a box-office record that would not be surpassed until Walt Disney's Snow White and the Seven Dwarfs (1937)."; The Broadway Melody: p. 24. "The Broadway Melody with a negative cost of $379,000, grossed $2.8 million in the United States, $4.8 million worldwide, and made a recorded profit of $1.6 million for MGM."; Gold Diggers of Broadway: p. 58. "It grossed an impressive $2.5 million domestically and nearly $4 million worldwide.")
1929	Sunny Side Up	$3,500,000^{*}^{R} ^{SS}	$600,000	(Note: Solomon, Aubrey (2002) [First published 1988]. Twentieth Century-Fox: a corporate and financial history. Filmmakers series. Vol. 20. Rowman & Littlefield. ISBN 978-0-8108-4244-1.: Sunny Side Up: p. 10. "Sunny Side Up, a musical starring Janet Gaynor and Charles Farrell, showed domestic rentals of $3.5 million, a record for the company."; Forever Amber: p. 66. "On the surface, with world rentals of $8 million, Forever Amber was considered a hit at distribution level."; The French Connection; p. 167. "The Planet of the Apes motion pictures were all moneymakers and Zanuck's record would have immediately improved had he stayed through the release of The French Connection, which took in rentals of approximately $75 million worldwide." p. 256. "$3,300,00".) (Note: Block & Wilson 2010, p. 46. "Production Cost: $0.6 (Unadjusted $s in Millions of $s).")
1930	All Quiet on the Western Front	$3,000,000^{R}	$1,250,000	(Note: Balio, Tino (1996). Grand Design: Hollywood as a Modern Business Enterprise, 1930–1939. Vol. 5 of History of the American Cinema. University of California Press. ISBN 978-0-520-20334-1.: Cavalcade: p. 182. "Produced by Winfield Sheehan at a cost of $1.25 million, Cavalcade won Academy Awards for best picture, director, art direction and grossed close to $4 million during its first release, much of which came from Great Britain and the Empire."; Whoopee: p. 212. "Produced by Sam Goldwyn at a cost of $1 million, the picture was an adaptation of a smash musical comedy built around Eddie Cantor...A personality-centered musical, Whoopee! made little attempt to integrate the comedy routines, songs, and story. Nonetheless, Cantor's feature-film debut grossed over $2.6 million worldwide and started a popular series that included Palmy Days (1931), The Kid from Spain (1932), and Roman Scandals (1933).") (Note: Hell's Angels: Balio, Tino (1976). United Artists: The Company Built by the Stars. University of Wisconsin Press. p. 110. "Hughes did not have the "Midas touch" the trade press so often attributed to him. Variety, for example, reported that Hell's Angels cost $3.2 million to make, and by July, 1931, eight months after its release, the production cost had nearly been paid off. Keats claimed the picture cost $4 million to make and that it earned twice that much within twenty years. The production cost estimate is probably correct. Hughes worked on the picture for over two years, shooting it first as a silent and then as a talkie. Lewis Milestone said that in between Hughes experimented with shooting it in color as well. But Variety's earnings report must be the fabrication of a delirious publicity agent, and Keats' the working of a myth maker. During the seven years it was in United Artists distribution, Hell's Angels grossed $1.6 million in the domestic market, of which Hughes' share was $1.2 million. Whatever the foreign gross was, it seems unlikely that it was great enough to earn a profit for the picture.")
1931	Frankenstein	$12,000,000^{R} ($1,400,000)^{R}	$250,000	(Note: Block & Wilson 2010, p. 163. "It drew $1.4 million in worldwide rentals in its first run versus $1.2 million for Dracula, which had opened in February 1931.")
1931	City Lights	$5,000,000^{R}	$1,607,351	
1932	The Sign of the Cross	$2,738,993^{R}	$694,065	(Note: Sedgwick, John (2000). Popular Filmgoing In 1930s Britain: A Choice of Pleasures. University of Exeter Press. pp. 146–148. ISBN 978-0-85989-660-3. "Sources: Eddie Mannix Ledger, made available to the author by Mark Glancy...": Grand Hotel: Production Cost $000s: 700; Distribution Cost $000s: 947; U.S. box-office $000s: 1,235; Foreign box-office $000s: 1,359; Total box-office $000s: 2,594; Profit $000s: 947.; The Merry Widow: Production Cost $000s: 1,605; Distribution Cost $000s: 1,116; U.S. box-office $000s: 861; Foreign box-office $000s: 1,747; Total box-office $000s: 2,608; Profit $000s: -113.; Viva Villa: Production Cost $000s: 1,022; Distribution Cost $000s: 766; U.S. box-office $000s: 941; Foreign box-office $000s: 934; Total box-office $000s: 1,875; Profit $000s: 87.; Mutiny on the Bounty: Production Cost $000s: 1,905; Distribution Cost $000s: 1,646; U.S. box-office $000s: 2,250; Foreign box-office $000s: 2,210; Total box-office $000s: 4,460; Profit $000s: 909.; San Francisco: Production Cost $000s: 1,300; Distribution Cost $000s: 1,736; U.S. box-office $000s: 2,868; Foreign box-office $000s: 2,405; Total box-office $000s: 5,273; Profit $000s: 2,237.) (Note: Shanghai Express: Block & Wilson 2010, p. 165. "Shanghai Express was Dietrich's biggest hit in America, bringing in $1.5 million in worldwide rentals.")
1933	King Kong	$5,347,000^{R} ($1,856,000)^{R}	$672,255.75	(Note: King Kong: Jewel, Richard (1994). "RKO Film Grosses: 1931–1951". Historical Journal of Film, Radio and Television. 14 (1): 39. "1933 release: $1,856,000; 1938 release: $306,000; 1944 release: $685,000"; "King Kong (1933) – Notes". Turner Classic Movies. Archived from the original on February 17, 2012. "1952 release: $2,500,000; budget: $672,254.75")
1933	I'm No Angel	$3,250,000+^{R}	$200,000	(Note: Finler 2003, p. 188. "The studio released its most profitable pictures of the decade in 1933, She Done Him Wrong and I'm No Angel, written by and starring Mae West. Produced at a rock-bottom cost of $200,000 each, they undoubtedly helped Paramount through the worst patch in its history...")
1933	Cavalcade	$3,000,000–4,000,000^{R}	$1,116,000	
1933	She Done Him Wrong	$3,000,000+^{R}	$274,076	(Note: Block & Wilson 2010, p. 135. "Total production cost: $274,076 (Unadjusted $s).")
1934	The Merry Widow	$2,608,000^{R}	$1,605,000	(Note: Turk, Edward Baron (2000) [1st. pub. 1998]. Hollywood Diva: A Biography of Jeanette MacDonald. University of California Press. ISBN 978-0-520-22253-3.: The Merry Widow: p. 361 Cost: $1,605,000. Earnings: domestic $861,000; foreign $1,747,000; total $2,608,000. Loss: $113,000.; San Francisco: p. 364 Cost: $1,300,000. Earnings: domestic $2,868,000; foreign $2,405,000; total $5,273,000. Profit: $2,237,000. [Reissues in 1938–39 and 1948–49 brought profits of $124,000 and $647,000 respectively.])
1934	It Happened One Night	$2,500,000^{R} ^{ON}	$325,000	
1935	Mutiny on the Bounty	$4,460,000^{R}	$1,905,000	
1936	San Francisco	$6,044,000+^{R} ($5,273,000)^{R}	$1,300,000	
1937	Snow White and the Seven Dwarfs	$418,000,000+^{S7} ($8,500,000)^{R}	$1,488,423	(Note: Snow White and the Seven Dwarfs: Monaco, Paul (2010). A History of American Movies: A Film-By-Film Look at the Art, Craft, and Business of Cinema. Scarecrow Press. p. 54. ISBN 978-0-8108-7434-3. "Considered a highly risky gamble when the movie was in production in the mid-1930s, by the fiftieth anniversary of its 1937 premiere Snow White's earnings exceeded $330 million."; Wilhelm, Henry Gilmer; Brower, Carol (1993). The Permanence and Care of Color Photographs: Traditional and Digital Color Prints, Color Negatives, Slides, and Motion Pictures. Preservation Pub. p. 359. ISBN 978-0-911515-00-8. "In only 2 months after the 1987 re-release, the film grossed another $45 million—giving it a total gross to date of about $375 million!"; "Snow White and the Seven Dwarfs (1987 Re-issue)". Boxoffice. Archived from the original on January 8, 2019. "North American box-office: $46,594,719"; "Snow White and the Seven Dwarfs (1993 Re-issue)". Boxoffice. Archived from the original on December 25, 2018. "North American box-office: $41,634,791") (Note: Snow White and the Seven Dwarfs and Pinocchio: Block & Wilson 2010; p. 207. "When the budget rose from $250,000 to $1,488,423 he even mortgaged his own home and automobile. Disney had bet more than his company on the success of Snow White." p. 237. "By the end of 1938, it had grossed more than $8 million in worldwide rentals and was ranked at the time as the second-highest-grossing film after the 1925 epic Ben-Hur". p. 255. "On its initial release Pinocchio brought in only $1.6 million in domestic rentals (compared with Snow White's $4.2 million) and $1.9 million in foreign rentals (compared with Snow White's $4.3 million).")
1938	You Can't Take It with You	$5,000,000^{R}	$1,200,000	(Note: 1938: You Can't Take It with You:"You Can't Take It With You Premieres". Focus Features. Focus Features. Archived from the original on September 13, 2012. "You Can't Take It With You received excellent reviews, won Best Picture and Best Director at the 1938 Academy Awards, and earned over $5 million worldwide."; Boys Town: Block, Alex Ben (2010), Boys Town, p. 215, "The film quickly became a smash nationwide, making a profit of over $2 million on worldwide rentals of $4 million." In: Block & Wilson 2010.; The Adventures of Robin Hood: Glancy, H. Mark (1995). "Warner Bros Film Grosses, 1921–51: the William Schaefer ledger". Historical Journal of Film, Radio and Television. 1 (15): 55–60. doi:10.1080/01439689500260031. ISSN 0143-9685. "$3.981 million."; Alexander's Ragtime Band: Block, Hayley Taylor (2010), Alexander's Ragtime Band, p. 213, "Once the confusion cleared, however, the film blossomed into a commercial success, with a profit of $978,000 on worldwide rentals of $3.6 million." In: Block & Wilson 2010.)
1939	Gone with the Wind	$390,516,513–402,382,193 ($32,000,000)^{R} ^{GW}	$3,900,000–4,250,000	(Note: Hall & Neale 2010, p. 283 ."The final negative cost of Gone with the Wind (GWTW) has been variously reported between $3.9 million and $4.25 million.")
1940	Pinocchio	$87,000,862^{*} ($3,500,000)^{R}	$2,600,000	
1940	Boom Town	$4,600,000^{*}^{R}	$2,100,000	(Note: Block & Wilson 2010, pp. 258–259. "Production Cost: $2.1 (Unadjusted $s in Millions of $s) ... Boom Town was the biggest moneymaker of 1940 and one of the top films of the decade.")
1941	Sergeant York	$7,800,000^{R}	$1,600,000	(Note: Block & Wilson 2010, p. 267. "With worldwide rentals of $7.8 million in its initial release, the movie made a net profit of over $3 million.") (Note: Finler 2003, p. 301. "The studio did particularly well with its war-related pictures, such as Sergeant York (1941), which cost $1.6 million but was the studio's biggest hit of the decade aside from This is the Army (1943), the Irving Berlin musical for which the profits were donated to the Army Emergency Relief fund.")
1942	Bambi	$267,997,843 ($3,449,353)^{R}	$1,700,000–2,000,000	(Note: Block & Wilson 2010, p. 281. "Worldwide rentals of $3,449,353 barely recouped the film's nearly $2 million production cost.") (Note: Block & Wilson 2010, pp. 712–713.: Bambi: "Worldwide Box Office: $266.8; Production Cost: $1.7 (Millions of $s)"; 101 Dalmatians: "Worldwide Box Office: $215.0; Production Cost: $3.6 (Millions of $s)"; The Jungle Book: "Worldwide Box Office: $170.8"; Production Cost: $3.9 (Millions of $s)"; Aladdin: "Worldwide Box Office: $505.1"; Production Cost: $28.0 (Millions of $s)")
1942	Mrs. Miniver	$8,878,000^{R}	$1,344,000	(Note: Block & Wilson 2010: Mrs. Miniver: Burns, Douglas (2010), Mrs. Miniver, p. 279, "Mrs. Miniver's galvanizing effect on Americans spawned a record-breaking ten-week run at Radio City Music Hall and garnered a $5.4 million take in domestic rentals (making Mrs. Miniver 1942's top grosser), with a $4.8 million profit on worldwide rentals of $8.9 million."; Yankee Doodle Dandy: p. 275. "It became the second biggest box-office hit of 1942 (after Mrs. Miniver) and was praised by critics, making a profit of $3.4 million on worldwide rentals of $6.5 million.")
1943	For Whom the Bell Tolls	$11,000,000^{R}	$2,681,298	
1943	This Is the Army	$9,555,586.44^{*}^{R}	$1,400,000	
1944	Going My Way	$6,500,000^{*}^{R}	$1,000,000	(Note: Finler 2003, pp. 356–363) (Note: Block & Wilson 2010, p. 420. "(Unadjusted $s) in Millions of $s – Production Cost: $1.0") (Note: Block & Wilson 2010, p. 232.: Mrs. Miniver: "Domestic Rentals: $5,358,000; Foreign Rentals: $3,520,000 (Unadjusted $s)"; Meet Me in St. Louis: "Domestic Rentals: $5,016,000; Foreign Rentals: $1,623,630 (Unadjusted $s)"; Easter Parade: "Domestic Rentals: $4,144,000; Foreign Rentals: $1,774,134 (Unadjusted $s)")
1945	Mom and Dad	$80,000,000^{MD}/$22,000,000^{R}	$65,000	
1945	The Bells of St. Mary's	$11,200,000^{R}	$1,600,000	(Note: Block & Wilson 2010: p. 296. "Production Cost: $1.6 (Unadjusted $s in Millions of $s)"; Wasson, Sam (2010), The Bells of St. Mary's, p. 297, "This was that rare sequel that did even better at the box office than the original, bringing in a $3.7 million profit on $11.2 million in worldwide rentals.")
1946	Song of the South	$65,000,000^{*} ($3,300,000)^{R}	$2,125,000	
1946	The Best Years of Our Lives	$14,750,000^{R}	$2,100,000	(Note: Hall & Neale 2010: p. 132."Best Years was considerably cheaper, costing only $2.1 million, and therefore vastly more profitable."; p. 286 (note 6.70). "Worldwide rentals for The Best Years of Our Lives amounted to $14,750,000.")
1946	Duel in the Sun	$10,000,000^{*}^{R}	$5,255,000	(Note: Hall & Neale 2010, p. 285 (note 6.56). "The cost of Duel in the Sun has been reported as both $5,255,000 (Haver, David O'Selznick's Hollywood, 361) and $6,480,000 (Thomson, Showman: The Life of David O'Selznick, 472); the latter figure may include distribution expenses. Forever Amber cost $6,375,000 (Solomon, Twentieth Century-Fox: A Corporate and Financial History, 243).")
1947	Forever Amber	$8,000,000^{R}	$6,375,000	
1947	Unconquered	$7,500,000^{R} ^{UN}	$4,200,000	
1948	Easter Parade	$5,918,134^{R}	$2,500,000	
1948	The Red Shoes	$5,000,000^{*}^{R}	£505,581 (~$2,000,000)	
1948	The Snake Pit	$4,100,000^{*}^{R}	$3,800,000	
1949	Samson and Delilah	$14,209,250^{R}	$3,097,563	(Note: Hall & Neale 2010, p. 136–139: Samson and Delilah: "...the film became the highest grosser in the studio's history to date, with domestic rentals of $7,976,730 by 1955 and a further $6,232,520 overseas...For all their spectacle, Samson and David were quite economically produced, costing $3,097,563 and $2,170,000 respectively."; Quo Vadis: "Production costs totaled a record $7,623,000...Worldwide rentals totaled $21,037,000, almost half of which came from the foreign market.")
1950	Cinderella	$263,591,415 ($20,000,000/$7,800,000^{R})	$2,200,000	
1950	King Solomon's Mines	$10,050,000^{R}	$2,258,000	
1951	Quo Vadis	$21,037,000–26,700,000^{R}	$7,623,000	(Note: Lev, Peter (2006). Transforming the Screen, 1950–1959. Vol. 7 of History of the American Cinema. University of California Press. ISBN 978-0-520-24966-0.: Quo Vadis: p. 15. "MGM's most expensive film of the period, Quo Vadis (1951) also did extremely well. The cost was $7,623,000, earnings were an estimated $21.2 million (with foreign earnings almost 50 percent of this total), and profit was estimated at $5,562,000."; Rear Window: pp. 203 –204. "Rear Window (1954) was an excellent commercial success, with a cost of $1 million and North American rentals of $5.3 million.") (Note: Block & Wilson 2010, p. 335.: The Robe: "Domestic Rentals: $16.7; Foreign Rentals: $9.4; Production Cost: $4.1 (Unadjusted $s in Millions of $s)."; Quo Vadis: "Domestic Rentals: $11.1; Foreign Rentals: $15.6; Production Cost: $7.5 (Unadjusted $s in Millions of $s).")
1952	This Is Cinerama	$50,000,000^{CI}	$1,000,000	
1952	The Greatest Show on Earth	$18,350,000^{R} ^{GS}	$3,873,946	
1953	Peter Pan	$145,000,000 ($7,000,000)^{*}^{R}	$3,000,000–4,000,000	
1953	The Robe	$25,000,000–26,100,000^{R}	$4,100,000	(Note: Hall & Neale 2010, p. 147–148. "To take full advantage of CinemaScope's panoramic possibilities, shooting was delayed for the sets to be redesigned and rebuilt, adding $500,000 to the eventual $4.1 million budget...It ultimately returned domestic rentals of $17.5 million and $25 million worldwide, placing it second only to Gone with the Wind in Variety's annually updated chart.") (Note: Block & Wilson 2010, p. 367. "It brought in $16.7 million in domestic rentals, $9.4 million in foreign rentals, and made a net profit of $8.1 million.")
1954	Rear Window	$24,500,000^{*} ($5,300,000)^{*}^{R}	$1,000,000	
1954	White Christmas	$26,000,050^{*} ($12,000,000)^{*}^{R}	$3,800,000	(Note: Block & Wilson 2010, p. 420. "Domestic Box Office: $19.6 million; Production Cost: $3.8 million.") (Note: Hall & Neale 2010, p. 149. "VistaVision was first used for the musical White Christmas (1954), which Variety named the top grosser of its year with anticipated domestic rentals of $12 million.")
1954	20,000 Leagues Under the Sea	$25,000,134^{*} ($6,800,000–8,000,000)^{*}^{R}	$4,500,000–9,000,000	(Note: Finler 2003, p. 320. "It was up and running in time to handle Disney's most elaborate expensive feature, 20,000 Leagues Under the Sea, based on the book by Jules Verne, starring James Mason and Kirk Douglas and directed by Richard Fleischer at a cost of $4.5 million.")
1955	Lady and the Tramp	$187,000,000 ($6,500,000)^{*}^{R}	$4,000,000	
1955	Cinerama Holiday	$21,000,000^{CI}	$2,000,000	
1955	Mister Roberts	$9,900,000^{R}	$2,400,000	(Note: Block & Wilson 2010: p. 382. "Production Cost: $2.4 (Unadjusted $s in Millions of $s)"; Burns, Douglas (2010), Mister Roberts, p. 383, "Mister Roberts sailed onto movie screens buoyed by enthusiastic reviews and receptive audiences. For pr, Fonda, Cagney, and lemmon reenacted several scenes on ed sullivan's popular Toast of the Town television variety show. It returned a net profit of $4.5 million on worldwide rentals of $9.9 million, putting it in the top 5 domestic films of 1955.")
1956	The Ten Commandments	$90,066,230^{R} ($122,700,000/$55,200,000^{R})	$13,270,000	(Note: Block & Wilson 2010, p. 327. "Production cost: $13.3 million; Domestic Film Rental: $31.3; Foreign Film Rental: $23.9; Worldwide Box office (estimated): $122.7 (Initial Release – Unadjusted $s in Millions of $s).") (Note: Hall & Neale 2010, pp. 159–161: The Ten Commandments: "No film did more to entrench roadshow policy than The Ten Commandments. While the success of This Is Cinerama, The Robe, and even Eighty Days could be attributed, at least in part, to their respective photographic and projection formats, that of DeMille's film (which cost a record $13,266,491) could not...General release began at normal prices in 1959 and continued until the end of the following year, when the film was temporarily withdrawn (the first of several reissues came in 1966). The worldwide rental by this time was around $60 million. In the domestic market it dislodged Gone with the Wind from the number one position on Variety's list of All-Time Rentals Champs. GWTW had hitherto maintained its lead through several reissues (and was soon to regain it through another in 1961)."; The Bridge on the River Kwai: Columbia's Anglo-American war film The Bridge on the River Kwai (1957) opened on a roadshow basis in selected U.S. cities (including New York, Chicago, Boston, and Los Angeles) and in London. Costing only $2,840,000 to produce, it grossed $30.6 million worldwide on first release.")
1957	The Bridge on the River Kwai	$30,600,000^{R}	$2,840,000	
1958	South Pacific	$30,000,000^{R}	$5,610,000	(Note: Hall & Neale 2010, p. 153. "South Pacific also became for a time the most successful film ever released in the United Kingdom, where it earned a box-office gross three times its negative cost of $5,610,000. Anticipated global rentals after three years were $30 million.")
1959	Ben-Hur	$90,000,000^{R} ($146,900,000/$66,100,000^{R})	$15,900,000	(Note: Block & Wilson 2010, p. 324. "Worldwide box office: $146.9 million; Worldwide rentals: $66.1 million; Production cost: $15.9 million. (Initial Release – Unadjusted $s in Millions of $s)")
1960	Swiss Family Robinson	$30,000,000^{R}	$4,000,000	
1960	Spartacus	$60,000,000 ($22,105,225)^{R}	$10,284,014	(Note: Hall & Neale 2010, p. 179.: Spartacus: "In the case of Spartacus, overseas earnings to 1969 amounted to $12,462,044, while U.S. and Canadian rentals (even including a million-dollar TV sale) were only $10,643,181. But the film failed to show a profit on production costs of $10,284,014 because of the distribution charges and expenses amounting to an additional $15,308,083."; The Bible: "The Bible—In the Beginning... (1966) was financed by the Italian producer Dino De Laurentiis from private investors and Swiss banks. He then sold distribution rights outside Italy jointly to Fox and Seven Arts for $15 million (70 percent of which came from Fox), thereby recouping the bulk of his $18 million investment. Although The Bible returned a respectable world rental of $25.3 million, Fox was still left with a net loss of just over $1.5 million. It was the last biblical epic to be released by any major Hollywood studio for nearly twenty years.")
1960	Psycho	$50,000,000+ ($14,000,000)^{R}	$800,000	
1961	One Hundred and One Dalmatians	$303,000,000	$3,600,000–4,000,000	
1961	West Side Story	$105,000,000 ($31,800,000)^{R}	$7,000,000	(Note: Block & Wilson 2010, p. 434.: The Sound of Music: "Domestic Rentals: $68.4; Foreign Rentals: $46.2; Production Cost: $8.0 (Initial Release – Unadjusted $s in Millions of $s)."; The Dirty Dozen: "Domestic Rentals: $20.1; Foreign Rentals: $11.2; Production Cost: $5.4 (Initial Release – Unadjusted $s in Millions of $s)."; 2001: A Space Odyssey: "Domestic Rentals: $16.4; Foreign Rentals: $5.5; Production Cost: $10.3 (Initial Release – Unadjusted $s in Millions of $s)."; Cleopatra: "Domestic Rentals: $22.1; Foreign Rentals: $18.2; Production Cost: $44.0 (Initial Release – Unadjusted $s in Millions of $s)."; West Side Story: "Domestic Rentals: $16.2; Foreign Rentals: $15.6; Production Cost: $7.0 (Initial Release – Unadjusted $s in Millions of $s)."; The Longest Day: "Domestic Rentals: $13.9; Foreign Rentals: $19.3; Production Cost: $8.6 (Initial Release – Unadjusted $s in Millions of $s)."; Butch Cassidy and the Sundance Kid: "Domestic Rentals: $29.2; Foreign Rentals: $7.9; Production Cost: $6.6 (Initial Release – Unadjusted $s in Millions of $s).")
1962	Lawrence of Arabia	$77,324,852 ($69,995,385)	$13,800,000	(Note: Lawrence of Arabia: 1962 release: "Lawrence of Arabia". The Numbers. Nash Information Services. LLC. Archived from the original on March 16, 2012. "Worldwide Box Office: $69,995,385; International Box Office: $32,500,000"; U.S. total (including reissues): "Lawrence of Arabia". Boxoffice. Archived from the original on August 10, 2014. "$44,824,852") (Note: Hall & Neale 2010, p. 165–166: Lawrence of Arabia: Columbia released the $13.8 million Lawrence of Arabia (1962), filmed in Super Panavision 70, exclusively on a hard-ticket basis, but opened Barabbas (1962), The Cardinal (1963), and the $12 million Joseph Conrad adaptation Lord Jim (1965) as 70 mm roadshows in selected territories only."; The Longest Day: "Darryl's most ambitious independent production was The Longest Day (1962), a three-hour reconstruction of D-Day filmed in black-and-white CinemaScope at a cost of $8 million. It grossed over $30 million worldwide as a roadshow followed by general release, thereby helping the studio regain stability during its period of reorganization."; Cleopatra: "With top tickets set at an all-time high of $5.50,Cleopatra had amassed as much as $20 million in such guarantees from exhibitors even before its premiere. Fox claimed the film had cost in total $44 million, of which $31,115,000 represented the direct negative cost and the rest distribution, print and advertising expenses. (These figures excluded the more than $5 million spent on the production's abortive British shoot in 1960–61, prior to its relocation to Italy.) By 1966 worldwide rentals had reached $38,042,000 including $23.5 million from the United States.")
1962	How the West Was Won	$35,000,000^{R}	$14,483,000	(Note: Hall & Neale 2010, p. 164. "West cost $14,483,000; although it earned $35 million worldwide in just under three years, with ultimate domestic rentals totaling $20,932,883, high distribution costs severely limited its profitability.")
1962	The Longest Day	$33,200,000^{R}	$8,600,000	
1963	Cleopatra	$40,300,000^{R}	$31,115,000	
1963	From Russia with Love	$78,900,000/$29,400,000^{R} ($12,500,000)^{R}	$2,000,000	(Note: Block & Wilson 2010, pp. 428–429: From Russia With Love: "Worldwide Box Office: 78.9; Production Cost: 2.0 (in millions of $s)"; Goldfinger: "Worldwide Box Office: 124.9; Production Cost: 3.0 (in millions of $s)"; Diamonds Are Forever: "Worldwide Box Office: 116; Production Cost: 7.2 (in millions of $s)"; Moonraker: "Worldwide Box Office: 210.3; Production Cost: 34.0 (in millions of $s)") (Note: Chapman, James (2007). Licence to thrill: a cultural history of the James Bond films. I.B. Tauris. ISBN 978-1-84511-515-9.: From Russia With Love: "The American release of From Russia With Love again followed on some six months after it had been shown in Britain. North American rentals of $9.9 million were an improvement on its predecessor, helped by a slightly wider release, though they were still only half the $19.5 million of foreign rentals... (Online copy at Google Books)"; Diamonds Are Forever: "Diamonds Are Forever marked a return to the box-office heights of the Bond films of the mid-1960s. Its worldwide rentals were $45.7 million..."; Moonraker: "These figures were surpassed by Moonraker, which earned total worldwide rentals of $87.7 million, of which $33 million came from North America. (Online copy at Google Books)") (Note: Balio, Tino (2009). United Artists, Volume 2, 1951–1978: the Company that Changed the Film Industry. University of Wisconsin Press. p. 261. ISBN 978-0-299-23014-2.: From Russia With Love: "The picture grossed twice as much as Dr. No, both domestic and foreign—$12.5 million worldwide (Online copy at Google Books)"; Goldfinger: "Produced on a budget of around $3 million, Goldfinger grossed a phenomenal $46 million worldwide the first time around. (Online copy at Google Books)")
1964	My Fair Lady	$55,000,000^{R}	$17,000,000	(Note: Hall & Neale 2010, p. 184: My Fair Lady: "My Fair Lady (1964) cost Warners $17 million to make, including a record $5.5 million just for the film rights to the Alan Jay Lerner and Frederick Loewe stage show and a million-dollar fee for star Audrey Hepburn. By 1967 it was reported to have grossed $55 million from roadshowing worldwide."; Mary Poppins: "Mary Poppins (1964), which cost $5.2 million, was neither a stage adaptation nor a roadshow. But by the end of its first release, it had grossed nearly $50 million worldwide.")
1964	Goldfinger	$124,900,000 ($46,000,000)^{R}	$3,000,000	
1964	Mary Poppins	$44,000,000–$50,000,000^{R}	$5,200,000	
1965	The Sound of Music	$287,814,441 ($114,600,000)^{R}	$8,000,000	
1966	The Bible: In the Beginning	$25,325,000^{R}	$18,000,000	
1966	Hawaii	$34,562,222^{*} ($15,600,000)^{*}^{R}	$15,000,000	
1966	Who's Afraid of Virginia Woolf?	$33,736,689^{*} ($14,500,000)^{*}^{R}	$7,613,000	(Note: Hall & Neale 2010, p. 188. "The negative cost of Warners' adaptation of Edward Albee's play Who's Afraid of Virginia Woolf? (1966)—filmed in widescreen and black-and-white, largely set in domestic interiors and with a cast of only four principal actors—amounted to $7,613,000, in part because stars Elizabeth Taylor and Richard Burton received up-front fees of $1 million and $750,000 respectively, against 10 percent of the gross apiece. (Their participation was presumably added to the budget).")
1967	The Jungle Book	$378,000,000 ($23,800,000)^{R}	$3,900,000–4,000,000	
1967	The Graduate	$85,000,000^{R}	$3,100,000	(Note: Denisoff, R. Serge; Romanowski, William D. (1991). Risky Business: Rock in Film. Transaction Publishers. ISBN 978-0-88738-843-9.: The Graduate: p. 167. "World net rental was estimated at more than $85 million by January 1971."; Grease: p. 236. "The film was produced for $6 million and Paramount reportedly spent another $3 million on promotion.") (Note: Hall & Neale 2010, p. 191–192: The Graduate: "The Graduate eventually earned U.S. rentals of $44,090,729 on a production cost of $3.1 million to become the most lucrative non-roadshow picture (and independent release) to date."; Butch Cassidy and the Sundance Kid: "None of these films was roadshown in the United States; most were set in contemporary America or had a contemporary "take" on the past (the casting of genuine teenagers to play Romeo and Juliet, the urbane sophistication of the dialogue in Butch Cassidy, the antiauthoritarianism of Bonnie and Clyde and MASH); most were produced on modest or medium-sized budgets (as low as $450,000 for Easy Rider and no higher than $6,825,000 for Butch Cassidy); and all grossed upward of $10 million domestically.")
1968	2001: A Space Odyssey	$141,000,000–190,000,000 ($21,900,000)^{R}	$10,300,000	(Note: 2001: A Space Odyssey: Total: Miller, Frank. "2001: A Space Odyssey (1968) – Articles". Turner Classic Movies. Archived from the original on February 12, 2012. "2001: A Space Odyssey made $15 million on its initial U.S. release, and currently shows a worldwide gross of over $190 million."; As of 2006: Palmer, R. Barton (2006). "2001: The Critical Reception and the Generation Gap". In Kolker, Robert Phillip (ed.). Stanley Kubrick's 2001: a Space Odyssey: New Essays. Oxford University Press. p. 16. ISBN 978-0-19-517452-6. "With its initial and subsequent releases, domestic and worldwide, Kubrick's arty, intellectual film earned nearly $138 million, which was, at that time, an astounding figure."; 2013 re-release: "2001: A Space Odyssey (2013 re-release)". Box Office Mojo. Archived from the original on June 15, 2019. "Domestic Total Gross: $214,618; United Kingdom: $568,997"; 2014 re-release: "2001: A Space Odyssey (2014 re-release)". Box Office Mojo. Archived from the original on June 5, 2019. "Domestic Total Gross: $135,370"; 2018 re-release: "2001: A Space Odyssey (2018 re-release)". Box Office Mojo. Archived from the original on June 15, 2019. "Domestic Total Gross: $1,283,820; Australia: $192,457; Greece: $27,510; Netherlands: $159,068; New Zealand: $5,046; Russia: $155,841; United Kingdom: $296,525")
1968	Funny Girl	$80,000,000–100,000,000	$8,800,000	
1969	Butch Cassidy and the Sundance Kid	$152,308,525 ($37,100,000)^{R}	$6,600,000	(Note: Butch Cassidy and the Sundance Kid: United States and Canada: "Butch Cassidy and the Sundance Kid". Boxoffice. Archived from the original on January 8, 2019. "$102,308,525"; Outside North America: Vanity Fair. 2008. p. 388. "Butch Cassidy went on to be a huge hit—by the spring of 1970 it had taken in $46 million in North America and grossed another $50 million abroad.")
1970	Love Story	$173,400,000 ($80,000,000)^{R}	$2,260,000	
1971	The French Connection	$75,000,000^{R}	$3,300,000	
1971	Fiddler on the Roof	$49,400,000^{R} ($100,000,000/$45,100,000^{R})	$9,000,000	(Note: Block & Wilson 2010, p. 549. "Fiddler had the highest domestic box office of 1971 (it was second in worldwide box office after Diamonds Are Forever), with more than $100 million in unadjusted worldwide box office on its initial release. The soundtrack album was also a huge seller. The 1979 rerelease was not as successful, with the $3.8 million print and ad costs almost as high as the $4.3 million in worldwide rentals.") (Note: Block & Wilson 2010, p. 527.: Star Wars: "Domestic Rentals: $127.0; Foreign Rentals: $141.5; Production Cost: $13.0 (Initial Release – Unadjusted $s in Millions of $s)."; The Godfather: "Domestic Rentals: $85.6; Foreign Rentals: $42.0; Production Cost: $7.2 (Initial Release – Unadjusted $s in Millions of $s)."; Fiddler on the Roof: "Domestic Rentals: $34.0; Foreign Rentals: $11.1; Production Cost: $9.0 (Initial Release – Unadjusted $s in Millions of $s)."; Rocky: "Domestic Rentals: $56.0; Foreign Rentals: $21.1; Production Cost: $1.6 (Initial Release – Unadjusted $s in Millions of $s).")
1971	Diamonds Are Forever	$116,000,000 ($45,700,000)^{R}	$7,200,000	
1972	The Godfather	$246,120,974–287,000,000 ($127,600,000–142,000,000)^{R}	$6,000,000–7,200,000	(Note: The Godfather: 1974: Newsweek. Vol. 84. 1974. p. 74. "The original Godfather has grossed a mind-boggling $285 million..."; 1991: Von Gunden, Kenneth (1991). Postmodern auteurs: Coppola, Lucas, De Palma, Spielberg, and Scorsese. McFarland & Company. p. 36. ISBN 978-0-89950-618-0. "Since The Godfather had earned over $85 million in U.S.-Canada rentals (the worldwide box-office gross was $285 million), a sequel, according to the usual formula, could be expected to earn approximately two-thirds of the original's box-office take (ultimately Godfather II had rentals of $30 million)."; Releases: "The Godfather (1972)". Box Office Mojo. Archived from the original on February 6, 2020. "Original release: $243,862,778; 1997 re-release: $1,267,490; 2009 re-release: $121,323; 2011 re-release: $818,333; 2014 re-release: $29,349; 2018 re-release: $21,701; Budget: $6,000,000")
1973	The Exorcist	$430,872,776 ($112,300,000)^{R}	$10,000,000	
1973	The Sting	$115,000,000^{R}	$5,500,000	(Note: New York, vol. 8, 1975, "...Jaws should outstrip another MCA hit, The Sting, which had world-wide revenues of $115 million." (Online copy at Google Books)) (Note: Block & Wilson 2010, p. 560. "Production Cost: $5.5 (Unadjusted $s in Millions of $s).")
1974	The Towering Inferno	$203,336,412 ($104,838,000)^{R}	$14,300,000	(Note: Hall & Neale 2010, pp. 206–208. "The most successful entry in the disaster cycle was the $15 million The Towering Inferno which earned over $48,650,000 in domestic rentals and about $40 million foreign.") (Note: Block & Wilson 2010, p. 568. "Production Cost: $14.3 (Unadjusted $s in Millions of $s).")
1975	Jaws	$495,201,848 ($193,700,000)^{R}	$9,000,000	(Note: Jaws: Original release: "Jaws (1975)". Box Office Mojo. Archived from the original on April 2, 2020. "Original Release: $260,000,000 (domestic); $210,653,000 (international); $470,653,000 (worldwide)"; Re-release grosses: "Jaws (1975)". Box Office Mojo. "$280,083,300 (all-release domestic); $507,140 (2012 international); $42,864 (2019 international); $27,747 (2020 international); $532,047 (2022 international); $3,642 (2024 international); $3,352,108 (2025 international)")
1976	Rocky	$225,000,000 ($77,100,000)^{R}	$1,075,000	(Note: Hall & Neale 2010, p. 214. "Rocky was the "sleeper of the decade". Produced by UA and costing just under $1 million, it went on to earn a box-office gross of $117,235,247 in the United States and $225 million worldwide.")
1977	Star Wars	$775,398,507 ($530,000,000^{SW}/$268,500,000^{R})	$11,293,151	(Note: Hall & Neale 2010, p. 218. "Eventually costing $11,293,151, Star Wars was previewed at the Northpoint Theatre in San Francisco on May 1, 1977.")
1978	Grease	$396,271,103 ($341,000,000)	$6,000,000	
1979	Moonraker	$210,308,099	$31,000,000	(Note: Kramer vs. Kramer: United & Babson Investment Report. Vol. 72. Babson-United, Inc. 1980. p. 262. "Columbia Pictures Industries is continuing to rake in the box office dollars from its Oscar-winning Kramer vs. Kramer, which has topped $100 million in domestic grosses and $70 million overseas. Kramer, which cost less than $8 million to make, is now the second..."; Prince, Stephen (2002). A New Pot of Gold: Hollywood Under the Electronic Rainbow, 1980–1989. University of California Press. p. 7. ISBN 978-0-520-23266-2. "Much of this was attributable to the performance of its hit film, Kramer vs. Kramer ($94 million worldwide and the number two film in the domestic market).")
1979	Rocky II	$200,182,160	$7,000,000	
1980	The Empire Strikes Back	$550,016,086 ($413,562,607)^{SW}	$23,000,000–32,000,000	(Note: The Empire Strikes Back: Total up to 2014: "The Empire Strikes Back (1980)". Box Office Mojo. "$538,375,067"; Special edition: "The Empire Strikes Back (Special Edition)". Box Office Mojo. "North America: $67,597,694; Overseas: $57,214,766"; 2015 re-release: "The Empire Strikes Back (2015 Re-release)". Box Office Mojo. "United Kingdom: $9,593,937"; 2020 re-release: "The Empire Strikes Back (2020 Re-release)". Box Office Mojo. "$3,137,879") (Note: Block & Wilson 2010, p. 519.: The Empire Strikes Back: "Production Cost: $32.0 (Unadjusted $s in Millions of $s)."; Return of the Jedi: "Production Cost: $42.7 (Unadjusted $s in Millions of $s)."; The Phantom Menace: "Production Cost: $127.5 (Unadjusted $s in Millions of $s).")
1981	Raiders of the Lost Ark	$389,925,971 ($321,866,000–353,988,025)	$18,000,000–22,800,000	(Note: Raiders of the Lost Ark: "Raiders of the Lost Ark (1981)". Box Office Mojo. "Total: $389,925,971; North America: $212,222,025 (original run); Overseas: $141,766,000"; Block & Wilson 2010, p. 625. Domestic Box office: $180.1; "Production Cost: $22.8 (Initial Release – Unadjusted $s in Millions of $s).")
1982	E.T. the Extra-Terrestrial	$797,307,407 ($619,000,000–664,000,000)	$10,500,000–12,200,000	(Note: Block & Wilson 2010, p. 609. "Steven Spielberg, by far the most successful director of the decade, had the highest-grossing movie with 1982's E.T.: The Extra-Terrestrial, which grossed over $664 million in worldwide box office on initial release.") (Note: Block & Wilson 2010, p. 652. "Production Cost: $12.2 (Unadjusted $s in Millions of $s).")
1983	Return of the Jedi	$482,466,382 ($385,845,197)^{SW}	$32,500,000–42,700,000	(Note: Return of the Jedi: Total: "Return of the Jedi (1983)". Box Office Mojo. "$482,466,382"; Special edition: "Return of the Jedi (Special Edition)". Box Office Mojo. "$89,388,357"; 2023 Re-release: "Return of the Jedi (2023 Re-release)". Box Office Mojo. "$7,259,924")
1984	Ghostbusters	$370,000,000 ($355,200,000)	$25,000,000–30,000,000	(Note: Ghostbusters: US and Canada: "Ghostbusters (1984)". Box Office Mojo. "Original release: $229,242,989; Lifetime: $243,640,120"; Outside of United States (as of 1999): "All-time Boxoffice Champs". The Hollywood Reporter. December 28, 1999. "International: $126.0 million"; Outside of United States (since 1999): "Ghostbusters (1984)". Box Office Mojo. "2011 re-release (United Kingdom): $161,688; 2019 re-release (Asia-Pacific): $60,823; 2020 re-release (Asia Pacific): $101,133")
1985	Back to the Future	$402,170,338 ($381,109,762)	$19,000,000–22,000,000	(Note: Back to the Future: Original release: "Back to the Future (1985)". Box Office Mojo. Archived from the original on August 6, 2020. "Worldwide: $381,109,762; Production Budget: $19 million"; 2014 re-release: "Back to the Future (2014 re-release)". Box Office Mojo. "$5,641,847"; 2020 re-release: "Back to the Future (2020 re-release)". Box Office Mojo. "$571,778"; 2023 re-release: "Back to the Future (2023 re-release)". Box Office Mojo. "$1,419,521"; 2025 re-release: "Back to the Future (40th Anniversary)". Box Office Mojo. "$13,123,545"; 2026 re-release: "Back to the Future (2026 re-release)". Box Office Mojo. "$303,885") (Note: Finler 2003, p. 268. "The studio had a record operating income of $212 million in 1982, the year of Spielberg's E.T. The Extra-Terrestrial (which had cost only slightly over $10 million) and $150 million in 1985, mainly due to another Spielberg production, the $22 million Back to the Future, which became the top box office hit of the year.")
1986	Top Gun	$360,552,341 ($345,000,000)	$14,000,000–19,000,000	(Note: Finler 2003, pp. 190–191.)
1987	Fatal Attraction	$320,145,693	$14,000,000	(Note: Fatal Attraction: "Fatal Attraction (1987)". Box Office Mojo.; Scott, Vernon (June 15, 1990). "'Three Men and Baby' Sequel Adds Cazenove to Original Cast". The Daily Gazette. New York. Hollywood (UPI). p. 9 (TV Plus – The Daily Gazette Supplement). "That legacy is the $167,780,960 domestic box-office and $75 million foreign gross achieved by the original...")
1988	Rain Man	$354,825,435	$30,000,000	(Note: Finler 2003, p. 244. "Rain Man: 30.0 (cost in million $s)")
1989	Indiana Jones and the Last Crusade	$474,171,806–494,000,000	$36,000,000–55,400,000	(Note: Block & Wilson 2010, pp. 694–695. "Production Cost: $55.4 (Unadjusted $s in Millions of $s) ... The film went on to haul in over $494 million worldwide.")
1990	Ghost	$505,870,681 ($505,702,588)	$22,000,000	
1991	Terminator 2: Judgment Day	$525,839,975 ($519,843,345)	$94,000,000	(Note: Terminator 2: Original release: "Terminator 2: Judgment Day (1991)". Box Office Mojo. Archived from the original on June 26, 2017. "$519,843,345"; 3D re-release: "Terminator 2: Judgment Day (2017 Re-release)". Box Office Mojo.)
1992	Aladdin	$504,050,219	$28,000,000	
1993	Jurassic Park	$1,037,535,230 ($912,667,947)	$63,000,000–70,000,000	(Note: Jurassic Park: Pre-2022 releases: "Jurassic Park (1993)". Box Office Mojo. Archived from the original on January 26, 2021. "Worldwide: $1,033,928,303; Original Release: $912,667,947; Production Budget: $63 million"; 2022 re-release: "Jurassic Park (2022 Re-release)". Box Office Mojo. "Mexico: $270,700"; 2023 re-release: "Jurassic Park (2023 Re-release)". Box Office Mojo. "$3,336,227"; As of 2010: Block & Wilson 2010, pp. 756–757. "Production Cost: $70.0 (Unadjusted $s in Millions of $s) ... Jurassic Park was a smash at the box office, bringing in $920 million in worldwide box office and spawning two sequels.")
1994	The Lion King	$970,946,637 ($763,455,561)	$45,000,000–79,300,000	(Note: The Lion King: Total (pre-2024): "The Lion King (1994)". Box Office Mojo. Archived from the original on June 1, 2024. "Worldwide: $968,750,694; Production Budget: $45 million"; Corrected overseas grosses (pre-2016): Brevert, Brad (May 29, 2016). "'X-Men' & 'Alice' Lead Soft Memorial Day Weekend; Disney Tops $4 Billion Worldwide". Box Office Mojo. "...the original release of The Lion King made $450.6 million internationally, an additional $3.8 million with the 2002 IMAX reissue, and another $91.3 million from 2011's 3D reissue for an international total of $545.7 million."; 2024 re-release (US & Canada): "The Lion King (2024 Re-Release)". Box Office Mojo. "Domestic: $2,195,943"; As of 2010: Block & Wilson 2010, p. 764. "Production Cost: $79.3 (Unadjusted $s in Millions of $s).")
1995	Toy Story	$384,990,631 ($363,007,140)	$30,000,000	(Note: Toy Story: Original release: "Toy Story (1995)". Box Office Mojo. Archived from the original on December 1, 2020. "Worldwide: $363,007,140"; 3D release: "Toy Story in 3D (2009)". Box Office Mojo. "Foreign Total: $10,555,852"; 2025 release: "Toy Story (2025 Re-release)". Box Office Mojo. "Total: $11,427,639") (Note: Block & Wilson 2010, pp. 776. "Production Cost: $30.0 (Unadjusted $s in Millions of $s)")
1995	Die Hard with a Vengeance	$366,101,666	$70,000,000	(Note: Finler 2003, p. 123.)
1996	Independence Day	$817,400,891	$75,000,000	
1997	Titanic	$2,257,906,828 ($1,843,373,318)	$200,000,000	
1998	Armageddon	$553,709,788	$140,000,000	(Note: Block & Wilson 2010, p. 509. "Production Cost: $140.0 (Unadjusted $s in Millions of $s).")
1999	Star Wars: Episode I – The Phantom Menace	$1,046,515,409 ($924,317,558)	$115,000,000–127,500,000	(Note: Star Wars Episode I: The Phantom Menace: Total: "Star Wars: Episode I – The Phantom Menace (1999)". Box Office Mojo. "$1,046,515,409"; Original release: "Star Wars: Episode I – The Phantom Menace (1999)". Box Office Mojo. Archived from the original on July 19, 2011. "$924,317,558")
2000	Mission: Impossible 2	$546,388,108	$100,000,000–125,000,000	
2001	Harry Potter and the Philosopher's Stone	$1,014,420,866^{HP1} ($974,755,371)	$125,000,000	(Note: Harry Potter and the Philosopher's Stone: Total: "Harry Potter and the Sorcerer's Stone (2001)". Box Office Mojo.)
2002	The Lord of the Rings: The Two Towers	$948,945,489 ($936,689,735)	$94,000,000	
2003	The Lord of the Rings: The Return of the King	$1,147,997,407 ($1,140,682,011)	$94,000,000	
2004	Shrek 2	$932,542,913 ($929,098,316)	$150,000,000	
2005	Harry Potter and the Goblet of Fire	$896,346,413 ($895,921,036)	$150,000,000	(Note: Harry Potter and the Goblet of Fire: Total: "Harry Potter and the Goblet of Fire (2005)". Box Office Mojo.)
2005	Star Wars: Episode III – Revenge of the Sith	$905,595,947 ($849,997,605)	$113,000,000	
2006	Pirates of the Caribbean: Dead Man's Chest	$1,066,185,783	$225,000,000	
2007	Pirates of the Caribbean: At World's End	$960,996,492	$300,000,000	
2008	The Dark Knight	$1,008,294,632 ($997,039,412)	$185,000,000	(Note: The Dark Knight: Total: "The Dark Knight (2008)". Box Office Mojo. Archived from the original on December 28, 2025.; Original release (excluding 2009 IMAX reissue): "The Dark Knight". The Numbers. Nash Information Services. LLC. Archived from the original on February 8, 2009. "North America: $531,039,412 (as of January 22, 2009); Overseas: $466,000,000; IMAX re-release: January 23, 2009"; 2009 IMAX re-release: "Warner Bros. Entertainment Wraps Record-Breaking Year". Warner Bros. January 8, 2009. "With worldwide receipts of $997 million, "The Dark Knight" is currently fourth on the all-time box office gross list, and the film is being re-released theatrically on January 23."; First-run gross and IMAX reissue: Gray, Brandon (February 20, 2009). "Billion Dollar Batman". Box Office Mojo. "The Dark Knight had been hovering just shy of $1 billion for several months and reportedly sat at $997 million when Warner Bros. modestly relaunched it on Jan. 23, timed to take advantage of the announcement of the Academy Awards nominations on Jan. 22.")
2009	Avatar	$2,923,710,708 ($2,743,577,587)	$237,000,000	
2010	Toy Story 3	$1,066,970,811	$200,000,000	
2011	Harry Potter and the Deathly Hallows – Part 2	$1,342,139,727 ($1,341,511,219)	$250,000,000^{HP8}	
2012	The Avengers	$1,518,815,515	$220,000,000	
2013	Frozen	$1,290,000,000 ($1,287,000,000)	$150,000,000	
2014	Transformers: Age of Extinction	$1,104,039,076	$210,000,000	
2015	Star Wars: The Force Awakens	$2,068,223,624	$535,500,000	
2016	Captain America: Civil War	$1,153,337,496 ($1,153,296,293)	$250,000,000	
2017	Star Wars: The Last Jedi	$1,332,539,889	$343,200,000	
2018	Avengers: Infinity War	$2,048,359,754	$316,000,000–400,000,000	
2019	Avengers: Endgame †	$2,942,661,253 ($2,799,439,100)	$356,000,000	
2020	Demon Slayer: Kimetsu no Yaiba – The Movie: Mugen Train	$515,417,627 ($507,119,058)	$15,750,000	
2021	Spider-Man: No Way Home	$1,922,598,800 ($1,912,233,593)	$200,000,000	
2022	Avatar: The Way of Water	$2,334,484,620 ($2,320,250,281)	$350,000,000–460,000,000	
2023	Barbie	$1,447,138,421	$128,000,000–145,000,000	
2024	Inside Out 2	$1,698,863,816	$200,000,000	
2025	Ne Zha 2	$2,217,758,382	$80,000,000	
2026	Spider-Man: Brand New Day †	$2,523,728,253	$225,000,000	

(...) Since grosses are not limited to original theatrical runs, a film's first-run gross is included in brackets after the total if known.

^{*}Canada and U.S. gross only.

^{R}Distributor rental.

^{TBA}To be ascertained.

^{IN}No contemporary sources provide figures for 20,000 Leagues Under the Sea, although The Numbers provides a figure of $8,000,000 for the North American box-office gross. However, it is possible this figure has been mistaken for the gross of the 1954 remake which also earned $8,000,000 in North American rentals.

^{FH}Some sources such as The Numbers state that Aloma of the South Seas is the highest grossing film of the year, earning $3 million. However, no contemporary sources provide figures for Aloma of the South Seas, so it is unclear what the $3 million figure relates to. If it were the rental gross then that would have made it not only the highest-grossing film of the year, but one of the highest-grossing films of the silent era, and if that is the case it would be unusual for both International Motion Picture Almanac and Variety to omit it from their lists.

^{SS}It is not clear if the figure for Sunny Side Up is for North America or worldwide. Other sources put its earnings at $2 million, which may suggest the higher figure is the worldwide rental, given the confusion over international figures during this period.

^{ON}The figure for It Happened One Night is not truly representative of its success: it was distributed as a package deal along with more than two dozen other Columbia films, and the total earnings were averaged out; the true gross would have been much higher.

^{S7}Snow White's $418 million global cume omits earnings outside of North America from 1987 onwards.

^{GW}It is not absolutely clear how much Gone with the Wind earned from its initial release. Contemporary accounts often list it as earning $32 million in North American rentals and retrospective charts have often duplicated this claim; however, it is likely this was the worldwide rental figure. Trade journals would collate the data by either obtaining it from the distributors themselves, who were keen to promote a successful film, or by surveying theaters and constructing an estimate. Distributors would often report the worldwide rental since the higher figure made the film appear more successful, while estimates were limited to performance in North America; therefore it was not unusual for worldwide and North American rentals to be mixed up. Following the outbreak of World War II, many of the foreign markets were unavailable to Hollywood so it became standard practice to just report on North American box-office performance. In keeping with this new approach, the North American rental for Gone with the Wind was revised to $21 million in 1947 ($11 million lower than the previous figure), and as of 1953—following the 1947 re-release—Variety was reporting earnings of $26 million. Through 1956, MGM reported cumulative North American earnings of $30,015,000 and foreign earnings of $18,964,000, from three releases. Worldwide rentals of $32 million from the initial release is consistent with the revised figures and later reported worldwide figures: they indicate that the film earned $21 million in North America and $11 million overseas from the initial release, and added a further $9 million in North America and $8 million overseas from subsequent re-releases up to 1956.

^{MD}Mom and Dad does not generally feature in 'high-gross' lists such as those published by Variety due to its independent distribution. Essentially belonging to the exploitation genre, it was marketed as an educational sex hygiene film in an effort to circumvent censorship laws. Falling foul of the Motion Picture Production Code, Mom and Dad was prevented from obtaining mainstream distribution and restricted to independent and drive-in theaters. It was the biggest hit of its kind, and remained in continual distribution until the 1970s when hardcore pornography eventually took over. At the end of 1947 it had earned $2 million, and by 1949, $8 million; by 1956 it had earned $22 million in rentals, representing a gross of $80 million, and would have easily placed in the top ten films in the late 1940s and early 1950s. Estimates of its total earnings are as high as $100 million.

^{UN}Chopra-Gant stipulates that the figure given for Unconquered is for North American box-office, but as was common at the time, the chart confuses worldwide and North American grosses. Other sources state that the takings for Forever Amber ($8 million) and Life with Father ($6.5 million) were in fact worldwide rental grosses, so it is possible this is also true of Unconquered.

^{CI}The Cinerama figures represent gross amounts. Since the Cinerama corporation owned the theaters there were no rental fees for the films, meaning the studio received 100% of the box-office gross, unlike the case with most other films where the distributor typically receives less than half the gross. Since Variety at the time ranked films by their U.S. and Canadian rental, they constructed a hypothetical rental figure for the Cinerama films to provide a basis for comparison to other films in their chart: in the case of This Is Cinerama, the $50 million worldwide gross was reconfigured as a $12.5 million U.S. rental gross; this is exactly 25% of the amount reported by Cinerama, so Variety's formula seemingly halved the gross to obtain an estimate for the U.S. share, and halved it again to simulate a rental fee. All five Cinerama features collectively generated $120 million in worldwide box office receipts.

^{GS}Variety put the worldwide rental for The Greatest Show on Earth at around $18.35 million (with $12.8 million coming from the United States) a year after its release; however, Birchard puts its earnings at just over $15 million up to 1962. It is likely that Birchard's figure is just the North American gross rental, and includes revenue from the 1954 and 1960 reissues.

^{SW}The "first run" Star Wars grosses do not include revenue from the 1997 special-edition releases; however, the figure does include revenue from the re-releases prior to the special editions.

^{HP1}The Harry Potter and the Philosopher's Stone reissue totals recorded by Box Office Mojo for Brazil (2020), Italy (2021), Netherlands (2021) and South Korea (2021) have been deducted from the lifetime gross due to Box Office Mojo double-counting the original release grosses in those countries.

^{HP8}Production costs were shared with Harry Potter and the Deathly Hallows – Part 1.

== Timeline of highest-grossing films ==
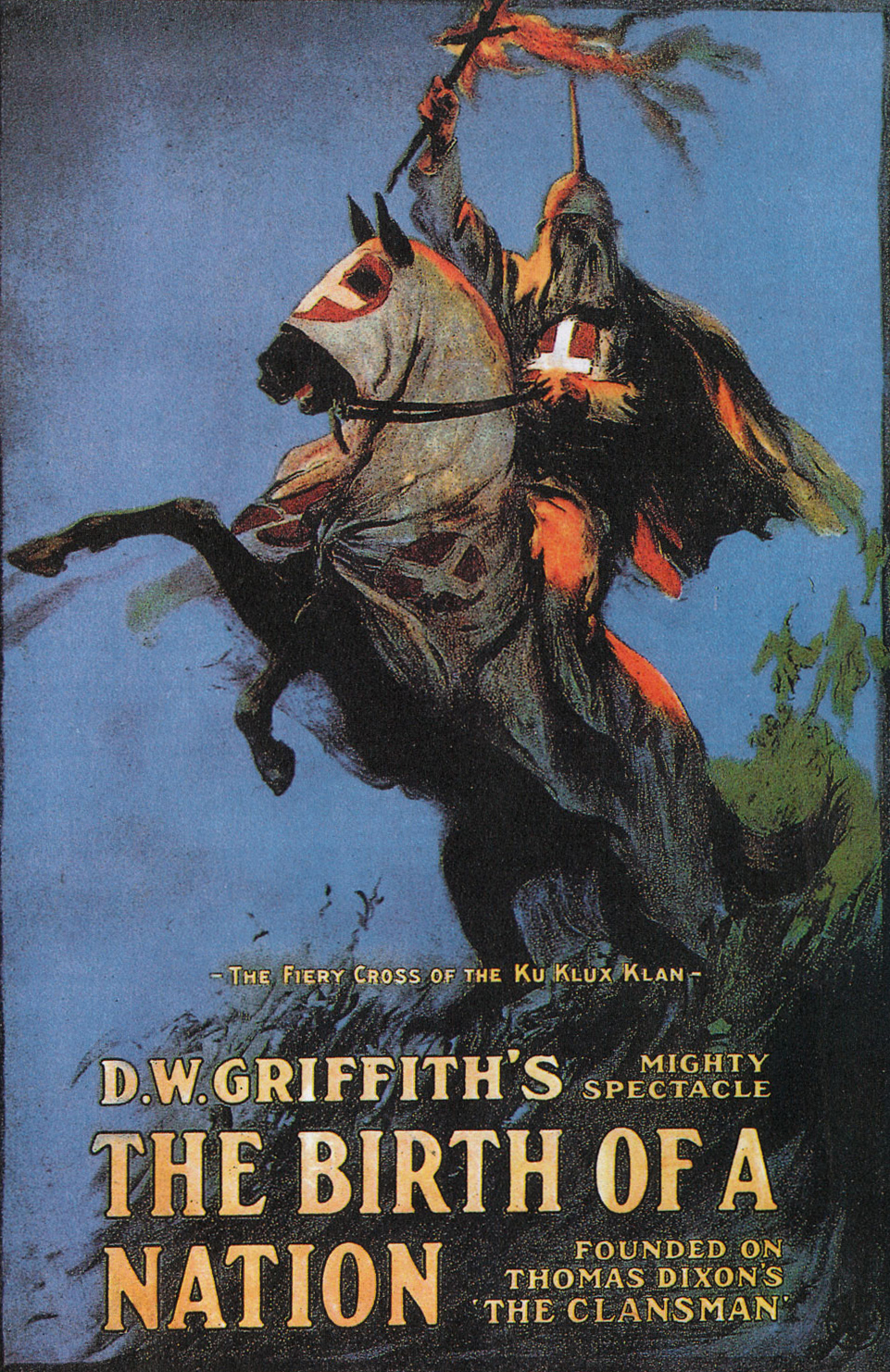
The Birth of a Nation pioneered many of the techniques used in filmmaking today, becoming the most successful film ever made at the time of its release.

At least eleven films have held the record of 'highest-grossing film' since The Birth of a Nation assumed the top spot in 1915. Both The Birth of a Nation and Gone with the Wind spent twenty-five consecutive years apiece as the highest-grosser, with films directed by Steven Spielberg and James Cameron holding the record on three occasions each. Spielberg became the first director to break his own record when Jurassic Park overtook E.T., and Cameron emulated the feat when Avatar broke the record set by Titanic. When it took over the top spot in 2019, Avengers: Endgame became the first sequel to hold the record of highest-grossing film and, in doing so, interrupted thirty-six years of Spielberg/Cameron dominance. Since then, Avatar and Avengers: Endgame have traded the top spot on a couple more occasions, with Avatar reclaiming it two years later in 2021 following a re-release, and Avengers: Endgame doing likewise in 2026.

Some sources claim that The Big Parade superseded The Birth of a Nation as highest-grossing film, eventually being replaced by Snow White and the Seven Dwarfs, which in turn was quickly usurped by Gone with the Wind. Exact figures are not known for The Birth of a Nation, but contemporary records put its worldwide earnings at $5.2 million as of 1919. Its international release was delayed by World War I, and it was not released in many foreign territories until the 1920s; coupled with further re-releases in the United States, its $10 million earnings as reported by Variety in 1932 are consistent with the earlier figure. At this time, Variety still had The Birth of a Nation ahead of The Big Parade ($6,400,000) on distributor rentals and—if its estimate is correct—Snow White and the Seven Dwarfs ($8,500,000) would not have earned enough on its first theatrical run to take the record; although it would have been the highest-grossing 'talkie', displacing The Singing Fool ($5,900,000). Although received wisdom holds that it is unlikely The Birth of a Nation was ever overtaken by a silent-era film, the record would fall to 1925's Ben-Hur ($9,386,000) if The Birth of a Nation earned significantly less than its estimated gross. In addition to its gross rental earnings through public exhibition, The Birth of a Nation played at a large number of private, club and organizational engagements which figures are unavailable for. It was hugely popular with the Ku Klux Klan who used it to drive recruitment, and at one point Variety estimated its total earnings to stand at around $50 million. Despite later retracting the claim, the sum has been widely reported even though it has never been substantiated. While it is generally accepted that Gone with the Wind took over the record of highest-grossing film on its initial release—which is true in terms of public exhibition—it is likely it did not overtake The Birth of a Nation in total revenue until a much later date, with it still being reported as the highest earner up until the 1960s. Gone with the Wind itself may have been briefly overtaken by The Ten Commandments (1956), which closed at the end of 1960 with worldwide rentals of $58–60 million compared to Gone with the Wind's $59 million; if it did claim the top spot its tenure there was short-lived, since Gone with the Wind was re-released the following year and increased its earnings to $67 million. Depending on how accurate the estimates are, the 1959 remake of Ben-Hur may also have captured the record from Gone with the Wind: as of the end of 1961 it had earned $47 million worldwide, and by 1963 it was trailing Gone with the Wind by just $2 million with international takings of $65 million, ultimately earning $66 million from its initial release.

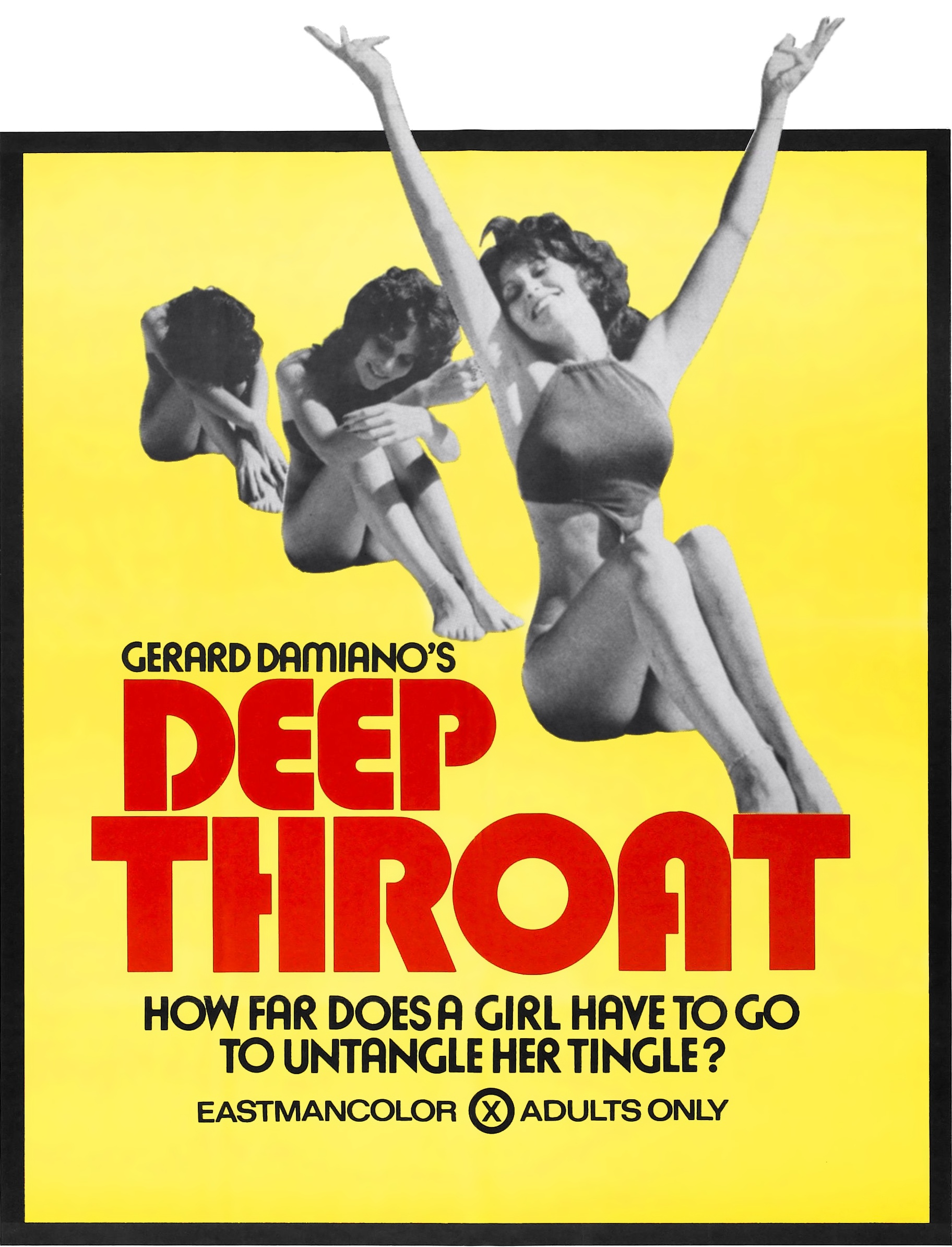
The 1972 pornographic film Deep Throat reportedly earned as much as $600 million, a figure that may have been inflated by gangsters in money-laundering schemes.

Another film purported to have been the highest-grosser is the 1972 pornographic film Deep Throat. In 1984, Linda Lovelace testified to a United States Senate Judiciary Subcommittee on juvenile justice that the film had earned $600 million; this figure has been the subject of much speculation, since if it is accurate then the film would have made more money than Star Wars, and finished the 1970s as the highest-grossing film. The main argument against this figure is that it simply did not have a wide enough release to sustain the sort of sums that would be required for it to ultimately gross this amount. Exact figures are not known, but testimony in a federal trial in 1976—about four years into the film's release—showed the film had grossed over $25 million. Roger Ebert has reasoned it possibly did earn as much as $600 million on paper, since mobsters owned most of the adult movie theaters during this period and would launder income from drugs and prostitution through them, so probably inflated the box-office receipts for the film.

The Birth of a Nation, Gone with the Wind, The Godfather, Jaws, Star Wars, E.T., Avatar and Avengers: Endgame all increased their record grosses with re-releases. The grosses from their original theatrical runs are included here along with totals from re-releases up to the point that they lost the record; therefore the total for The Birth of a Nation includes income from its reissues up to 1940; the total for Star Wars includes revenue from the late 1970s and early 1980s reissues but not from the 1997 Special Edition; the total for E.T. incorporates its gross from the 1985 reissue but not from 2002. The total for Avatar's first appearance on the chart includes revenue from the 2010 Special Edition, which represents all of its earnings up to the point it relinquished the record; its second appearance incorporates revenue from re-releases in 2020, 2021, 2022 and 2025 which helped it to reclaim the record and extend it, before losing it again following a re-release of Avengers: Endgame in 2026. Gone with the Wind is likewise represented twice on the chart: the 1940 entry includes earnings from its staggered 1939–1942 release (roadshow/general release/second-run) along with all of its revenue up to the 1961 reissue prior to losing the record to The Sound of Music in 1966; its 1971 entry—after it took back the record—includes income from the 1967 and 1971 reissues but omitting later releases. The Godfather was re-released in 1973 after its success at the 45th Academy Awards, and Jaws was released again in 1976, and their grosses here most likely include earnings from those releases. The Sound of Music, The Godfather, Jaws, Jurassic Park, and Titanic have all increased their earnings with further releases, but they are not included in the totals here because they had already conceded the record prior to being re-released.

† Background shading indicates films playing in the week commencing 20 November 2026 in theaters around the world.

Timeline of the highest-grossing film record
Established	Title	Record-setting gross	Ref
1915	The Birth of a Nation	$5,200,000^{R}	
1940	The Birth of a Nation	$15,000,000^{R} ^{‡}	
1940	Gone with the Wind	$32,000,000^{R}	
1963	Gone with the Wind	$67,000,000^{R} ^{‡}	
1966	The Sound of Music	$114,600,000^{R}	
1971	Gone with the Wind	$116,000,000^{R} ^{‡}	
1972	The Godfather	$127,600,000–142,000,000^{R}	(Note: New Times. Vol. 2. 1974. "Coppola is King Midas, the most individually powerful U.S. filmmaker ." His credits include directing the first Godfather (worldwide earnings: $142 million, ahead of Gone with the Wind, The Sound of Music and The Exorcist)..." (Online copy at Google Books))
1976	Jaws	$193,700,000^{R}	
1978	Star Wars	$410,000,000/$268,500,000^{R}	
1982	Star Wars	$530,000,000 ^{‡}	
1983	E.T. the Extra-Terrestrial	$619,000,000–664,000,000	
1993	E.T. the Extra-Terrestrial	$701,000,000 ^{‡}	
1993	Jurassic Park	$912,667,947	
1998	Titanic	$1,843,373,318	
2010	Avatar	$2,743,577,587	
2010	Avatar	$2,788,416,135 ^{‡}	
2019	Avengers: Endgame	$2,799,439,100	
2021	Avatar	$2,847,397,339 ^{‡}	
2025	Avatar	$2,923,710,708 ^{‡}	
2026	Avengers: Endgame †	$2,942,661,253 ^{‡}	

^{R}Distributor rental.

^{‡}Includes revenue from re-releases. If a film increased its gross through re-releases while holding the record, the year in which it recorded its highest gross is also noted in italics.

== Highest-grossing franchises and film series ==
Prior to 2000, only seven film series had grossed over $1 billion at the box office: James Bond, Star Wars, Indiana Jones, Rocky, Batman, Jurassic Park, and Star Trek. Since the turn of the century, that number has increased to over a hundred. This is partly due to inflation and market growth, but it is also due to Hollywood's adoption of the franchise model: films that have built-in brand recognition such as being based on a well-known literary source or an established character. The methodology is based on the concept that films associated with things audiences are already familiar with can be more effectively marketed to them, and as such are known as "pre-sold" films within the industry.

A franchise is typically defined to be at least two works derived from a common intellectual property. Traditionally, the work has a tautological relationship with the property, but this is not a prerequisite. An enduring staple of the franchise model is the concept of the crossover, which can be defined as "a story in which characters or concepts from two or more discrete texts or series of texts meet". A consequence of a crossover is that an intellectual property may be utilized by more than one franchise. For example, Batman v Superman: Dawn of Justice belongs to not only the Batman and Superman franchises, but also to the DC Extended Universe, which is a shared universe. A shared universe is a particular type of crossover where a number of characters from a wide range of fictional works wind up sharing a fictional world. The most successful shared universe in the medium of film is the Marvel Cinematic Universe, a crossover between multiple superhero properties owned by Marvel Comics. The Marvel Cinematic Universe is also the highest-grossing franchise, amassing over $35 billion at the box office. The Spider-Man films are the highest-grossing series based on a single property, earning over $13 billion at the box office (although the Eon James Bond films have earned over $19 billion in total when adjusted to current prices). (Note: Prior to the release of Spectre in 2015, the James Bond series had grossed approximately $17.7 billion at 2015 prices; after factoring in earnings of over $1.6 billion from Spectre and No Time to Die, the series has earned at least $19.3 billion adjusted for inflation.) The Marvel Cinematic Universe has had the most films gross over $1 billion, with twelve.

† Background shading indicates that at least one film in the series is playing in the week commencing 20 November 2026 in theaters around the world.

Highest-grossing franchises and film series^{[§]}(The films in each franchise can be viewed by selecting "show".)

Rank	Series	Total worldwide gross	No. of films	Average of films	Highest-grossing film

1
Marvel Cinematic Universe^{S} †
$35,155,957,102
38
$925,156,766
Avengers: Endgame ($2,942,661,253)

The Infinity Saga †	$22,734,422,833	23	$988,453,167	Avengers: Endgame ($2,942,661,253)
/ Phase Three † / $13,651,722,805 / 11 / $1,241,065,710 / Avengers: Endgame ($2,942,661,253); 1 / Avengers: Endgame (2019) † / $2,942,661,253; 2 / Avengers: Infinity War (2018) / $2,048,359,754; 3 / Black Panther (2018) / $1,347,280,838; 4 / Captain America: Civil War (2016) / $1,153,337,496; 5 / Spider-Man: Far From Home (2019) / $1,132,679,685; 6 / Captain Marvel (2019) / $1,128,274,794; 7 / Spider-Man: Homecoming (2017) / $880,918,840; 8 / Guardians of the Galaxy Vol. 2 (2017) / $863,756,051; 9 / Thor: Ragnarok (2017) / $853,983,879; 10 / Doctor Strange (2016) / $677,796,076; 11 / Ant-Man and the Wasp (2018) / $622,674,139
/ Phase Two / $5,269,487,547 / 6 / $878,247,925 / Avengers: Age of Ultron ($1,402,809,540); 1 / Avengers: Age of Ultron (2015) / $1,402,809,540; 2 / Iron Man 3 (2013) / $1,214,811,252; 3 / Guardians of the Galaxy (2014) / $773,350,147; 4 / Captain America: The Winter Soldier (2014) / $714,421,503; 5 / Thor: The Dark World (2013) / $644,783,140; 6 / Ant-Man (2015) / $519,311,965
/ Phase One / $3,813,212,481 / 6 / $635,535,414 / The Avengers ($1,518,815,515); 1 / The Avengers (2012) / $1,518,815,515; 2 / Iron Man 2 (2010) / $623,933,331; 3 / Iron Man (2008) / $585,796,247; 4 / Thor (2011) / $449,326,618; 5 / Captain America: The First Avenger (2011) / $370,569,774; 6 / The Incredible Hulk (2008) / $264,770,996

The Multiverse Saga †	$12,421,534,269	15	$828,102,285	Spider-Man: Brand New Day ($2,523,728,253)
/ Phase Four / $5,712,571,367 / 7 / $816,081,624 / Spider-Man: No Way Home ($1,922,598,800); 1 / Spider-Man: No Way Home (2021) / $1,922,598,800; 2 / Doctor Strange in the Multiverse of Madness (2022) / $955,775,804; 3 / Black Panther: Wakanda Forever (2022) / $859,208,836; 4 / Thor: Love and Thunder (2022) / $760,928,081; 5 / Shang-Chi and the Legend of the Ten Rings (2021) / $432,243,292; 6 / Eternals (2021) / $402,064,899; 7 / Black Widow (2021) / $379,751,655
/ Phase Five / $3,663,375,921 / 6 / $610,562,654 / Deadpool & Wolverine ($1,338,073,645); 1 / Deadpool & Wolverine (2024) / $1,338,073,645; 2 / Guardians of the Galaxy Vol. 3 (2023) / $845,555,777; 3 / Ant-Man and the Wasp: Quantumania (2023) / $476,071,180; 4 / Captain America: Brave New World (2025) / $415,101,577; 5 / Thunderbolts* (2025) / $382,436,917; 6 / The Marvels (2023) / $206,136,825
/ Phase Six † / $3,045,586,981 / 2 / $1,522,793,491 / Spider-Man: Brand New Day ($2,523,728,253); 1 / Spider-Man: Brand New Day (2026) † / $2,523,728,253; 2 / The Fantastic Four: First Steps (2025) / $521,858,728

2	Spider-Man †	$13,677,820,331	17	$804,577,667	Brand New Day ($2,523,728,253)
/ Marvel Cinematic Universe † / $6,459,925,578 / 4 / $1,614,981,395 / Brand New Day ($2,523,728,253); 1 / Brand New Day (2026) † / $2,523,728,253; 2 / No Way Home (2021) / $1,922,598,800; 3 / Far From Home (2019) / $1,132,679,685; 4 / Homecoming (2017) / $880,918,840
/ Raimi series / $2,511,239,929 / 3 / $837,079,976 / Spider-Man 3 ($895,735,062); 1 / Spider-Man 3 (2007) / $895,735,062; 2 / Spider-Man (2002) / $825,776,725; 3 / Spider-Man 2 (2004) / $789,728,142
/ Sony's Spider-Man Universe / $2,171,872,891 / 6 / $361,978,815 / Venom ($856,085,151); 1 / Venom (2018) / $856,085,151; 2 / Venom: Let There Be Carnage (2021) / $506,813,864; 3 / Venom: The Last Dance (2024) / $478,937,618; 4 / Morbius (2022) / $167,460,961; 5 / Madame Web (2024) / $100,498,764; 6 / Kraven the Hunter (2024) / $62,076,533
/ Webb series / $1,468,416,364 / 2 / $734,208,182 / The Amazing Spider-Man ($758,682,352); 1 / The Amazing Spider-Man (2012) / $758,682,352; 2 / The Amazing Spider-Man 2 (2014) / $709,734,012
/ Spider-Verse / $1,066,365,569 / 2 / $533,182,785 / Across the Spider-Verse ($690,824,738); 1 / Across the Spider-Verse (2023) / $690,824,738; 2 / Into the Spider-Verse (2018) / $375,540,831

3	Star Wars	$10,748,764,874	13	$826,828,067	The Force Awakens ($2,068,223,624)
Skywalker Saga / $8,884,298,420 / 9 / $987,144,269 / The Force Awakens ($2,068,223,624); / Sequel trilogy / $4,474,907,761 / 3 / $1,491,635,920 / The Force Awakens ($2,068,223,624); 1 / VII – The Force Awakens (2015) / $2,068,223,624; 2 / VIII – The Last Jedi (2017) / $1,332,539,889; 3 / IX – The Rise of Skywalker (2019) / $1,074,144,248 / Prequel trilogy / $2,601,509,684 / 3 / $867,169,895 / The Phantom Menace ($1,046,515,409); 1 / I – The Phantom Menace (1999) / $1,046,515,409; 2 / III – Revenge of the Sith (2005) / $905,595,947; 3 / II – Attack of the Clones (2002) / $649,398,328 / Original trilogy / $1,807,880,975 / 3 / $602,626,992 / A New Hope ($775,398,507); 1 / IV – A New Hope (1977) / $775,398,507; 2 / V – The Empire Strikes Back (1980) / $550,016,086; 3 / VI – Return of the Jedi (1983) / $482,466,382
/ Anthology films / $1,450,345,194 / 2 / $725,172,597 / Rogue One ($1,057,420,387); 1 / Rogue One (2016) / $1,057,420,387; 2 / Solo (2018) / $392,924,807
The Mandalorian and Grogu (2026) / $345,838,416
The Clone Wars (2008) / $68,282,844

4
Wizarding World
$9,661,429,305
11
$878,311,755
Harry Potter and the Deathly Hallows – Part 2 ($1,342,139,727)

	Harry Potter series	$7,785,384,052	8	$973,173,007	Deathly Hallows – Part 2 ($1,342,139,727)
1	Deathly Hallows – Part 2 (2011)	$1,342,139,727			
2	Philosopher's Stone (2001)	$1,014,420,866			
3	Deathly Hallows – Part 1 (2010)	$977,070,383			
4	Order of the Phoenix (2007)	$942,201,710			
5	Half-Blood Prince (2009)	$934,483,039			
6	Goblet of Fire (2005)	$896,815,106			
7	Chamber of Secrets (2002)	$880,684,614			
8	Prisoner of Azkaban (2004)	$797,568,607			

	Fantastic Beasts series	$1,876,045,253	3	$625,348,418	Fantastic Beasts and Where to Find Them ($814,038,508)
1	Fantastic Beasts and Where to Find Them (2016)	$814,038,508			
2	The Crimes of Grindelwald (2018)	$654,855,901			
3	The Secrets of Dumbledore (2022)	$407,150,844			

5	Avengers †	$7,912,646,062	4	$1,978,161,516	Endgame ($2,942,661,253)
1	Endgame (2019) †	$2,942,661,253			
2	Infinity War (2018)	$2,048,359,754			
3	The Avengers (2012)	$1,518,815,515			
4	Age of Ultron (2015)	$1,402,809,540			

6	James Bond	$7,836,510,562	27	$290,241,132	Skyfall ($1,108,594,137)
Eon series / $7,634,765,844 / 25 / $305,390,634 / Skyfall ($1,108,594,137); / Daniel Craig series / $3,969,538,100 / 5 / $793,907,620 / Skyfall ($1,108,594,137); 1 / Skyfall (2012) / $1,108,594,137; 2 / Spectre (2015) / $880,705,312; 3 / No Time to Die (2021) / $774,153,007; 4 / Casino Royale (2006) / $616,505,162; 5 / Quantum of Solace (2008) / $589,580,482 / Pierce Brosnan series / $1,479,008,618 / 4 / $369,752,155 / Die Another Day ($431,971,116); 1 / Die Another Day (2002) / $431,971,116; 2 / The World Is Not Enough (1999) / $361,832,400; 3 / GoldenEye (1995) / $352,194,034; 4 / Tomorrow Never Dies (1997) / $333,011,068 / Roger Moore series / $1,151,600,000 / 7 / $164,514,286 / Moonraker ($210,300,000); 1 / Moonraker (1979) / $210,300,000; 2 / For Your Eyes Only (1981) / $194,900,000; 3 / The Spy Who Loved Me (1977) / $185,400,000; 4 / Octopussy (1983) / $183,700,000; 5 / A View to a Kill (1985) / $152,400,000; 6 / Live and Let Die (1973) / $126,400,000; 7 / The Man with the Golden Gun (1974) / $98,500,000 / Sean Connery series / $621,500,000 / 6 / $103,583,333 / Thunderball ($141,200,000); 1 / Thunderball (1965) / $141,200,000; 2 / Goldfinger (1964) / $124,900,000; 3 / Diamonds Are Forever (1971) / $116,000,000; 4 / You Only Live Twice (1967) / $101,000,000; 5 / From Russia with Love (1963) / $78,900,000; 6 / Dr. No (1962) / $59,500,000 / Timothy Dalton series / $347,400,000 / 2 / $173,700,000 / The Living Daylights ($191,200,000); 1 / The Living Daylights (1987) / $191,200,000; 2 / Licence to Kill (1989) / $156,200,000 / George Lazenby series / $64,600,000 / 1 / $64,600,000 / On Her Majesty's Secret Service ($64,600,000); 1 / On Her Majesty's Secret Service (1969) / $64,600,000
Never Say Never Again (1983) / $160,000,000
Casino Royale (1967) / $41,744,718

7	X-Men	$7,422,190,386	14	$530,156,456	Deadpool & Wolverine ($1,338,073,645)
/ Main series / $3,059,525,837 / 7 / $437,075,120 / Days of Future Past ($746,045,700); 1 / Days of Future Past (2014) / $746,045,700; 2 / Apocalypse (2016) / $543,934,105; 3 / The Last Stand (2006) / $460,435,291; 4 / X2 (2003) / $407,711,549; 5 / First Class (2011) / $352,616,690; 6 / X-Men (2000) / $296,339,528; 7 / Dark Phoenix (2019) / $252,442,974
/ Deadpool series / $2,906,582,409 / 3 / $968,860,803 / Deadpool & Wolverine ($1,338,073,645); 1 / Deadpool & Wolverine (2024) / $1,338,073,645; 2 / Deadpool 2 (2018) / $785,896,609; 3 / Deadpool (2016) / $782,612,155
/ Wolverine series / $1,406,912,546 / 3 / $468,970,849 / Logan ($619,021,436); 1 / Logan (2017) / $619,021,436; 2 / The Wolverine (2013) / $414,828,246; 3 / Origins: Wolverine (2009) / $373,062,864
The New Mutants (2020) / $49,169,594

8
Fast & Furious
$7,339,469,390
11
$667,224,490
Furious 7 ($1,515,341,399)

	The Fast Saga	$6,578,736,464	10	$657,873,646	Furious 7 ($1,515,341,399)
1	Furious 7 (2015)	$1,515,341,399			
2	The Fate of the Furious (2017)^{F8}	$1,238,764,765			
3	Fast & Furious 6 (2013)	$788,680,968			
4	F9 (2021)	$726,229,501			
5	Fast X (2023)	$714,375,114			
6	Fast Five (2011)	$626,137,675			
7	Fast & Furious (2009)	$360,366,870			
8	2 Fast 2 Furious (2003)	$236,350,661			
9	The Fast and the Furious (2001)	$213,524,901			
10	Tokyo Drift (2006)	$158,964,610			

Hobbs & Shaw (2019)	$760,732,926

9	DC Extended Universe^{S}	$7,197,660,384	15	$479,844,026	Aquaman ($1,148,528,393)
1	Aquaman (2018)	$1,148,528,393			
2	Batman v Superman: Dawn of Justice (2016)	$873,637,528			
3	Wonder Woman (2017)	$822,854,286			
4	Suicide Squad (2016)	$746,846,894			
5	Man of Steel (2013)	$668,045,518			
6	Justice League (2017)	$657,926,987			
7	Aquaman and the Lost Kingdom (2023)	$440,181,226			
8	Black Adam (2022)	$393,452,111			
9	Shazam! (2019)	$365,971,656			
10	The Flash (2023)	$271,433,313			
11	Birds of Prey (2020)	$205,537,933			
12	Wonder Woman 1984 (2020)	$169,601,036			
13	The Suicide Squad (2021)	$168,717,425			
14	Shazam! Fury of the Gods (2023)	$134,138,006			
15	Blue Beetle (2023)	$130,788,072			

10	Batman †	$7,179,232,764	20	$358,961,638	The Dark Knight Rises ($1,081,169,825)
/ The Dark Knight trilogy / $2,463,137,450 / 3 / $821,045,817 / The Dark Knight Rises ($1,081,169,825); 1 / The Dark Knight Rises (2012) / $1,081,169,825; 2 / The Dark Knight (2008) / $1,008,294,632; 3 / Batman Begins (2005) / $373,672,993
/ Joker series / $1,281,958,569 / 2 / $640,979,285 / Joker ($1,074,458,282); 1 / Joker (2019) / $1,074,458,282; 2 / Folie à Deux (2024) / $207,500,287
/ Burton/Schumacher series / $1,253,192,682 / 4 / $313,298,171 / Batman ($411,556,825); 1 / Batman (1989) / $411,556,825; 2 / Batman Forever (1995) / $336,567,531; 3 / Batman Returns (1992) / $266,832,411; 4 / Batman & Robin (1997) / $238,235,915
Batman v Superman: Dawn of Justice (2016) / $873,637,528
The Batman (2022) / $772,319,315
The Lego Batman Movie (2017) / $311,950,384
Clayface (2026) † / $126,195,354
Catwoman (2004) / $82,102,379
Mask of the Phantasm (1993) / $5,617,391
/ DC Universe Animated Original Movies / $4,501,125 / 2 / $2,250,563 / The Killing Joke ($4,462,034); 1 / The Killing Joke (2016) / $4,462,034; 2 / Batman and Harley Quinn (2017) / $39,091
/ 1960s TV series / $3,957,343 / 2 / $1,978,672 / Batman: The Movie ($3,900,000); 1 / Batman: The Movie (1966)^{*}^{R} / $3,900,000; 2 / Return of the Caped Crusaders (2016) / $57,343
Aztec Batman: Clash of Empires (2025) / $663,244

11
Jurassic Park
$6,878,119,429
7
$982,588,490
Jurassic World ($1,671,537,444)

	Jurassic World series	$4,853,164,391	4	$1,213,291,098	Jurassic World ($1,671,537,444)
1	Jurassic World (2015)	$1,671,537,444			
2	Fallen Kingdom (2018)	$1,308,476,166			
3	Dominion (2022)	$1,004,004,592			
4	Rebirth (2025)	$869,146,189			

	Jurassic Park trilogy	$2,024,955,038	3	$674,985,013	Jurassic Park ($1,037,535,230)
1	Jurassic Park (1993)	$1,037,535,230			
2	The Lost World (1997)	$618,638,999			
3	Jurassic Park III (2001)	$368,780,809			

12	Avatar	$6,744,195,218	3	$2,248,065,073	Avatar ($2,923,710,708)
1	Avatar (2009)	$2,923,710,708			
2	The Way of Water (2022)	$2,334,484,620			
3	Fire and Ash (2025)	$1,485,999,890			

13
Despicable Me †
$6,152,513,504
7
$878,930,501
Minions ($1,159,444,662)

	Main series	$3,521,814,379	4	$880,453,595	Despicable Me 3 ($1,034,800,131)
1	Despicable Me 3 (2017)	$1,034,800,131			
2	Despicable Me 4 (2024)	$972,964,428			
3	Despicable Me 2 (2013)	$970,766,005			
4	Despicable Me (2010)	$543,283,815			

	Minions series †	$2,630,699,125	3	$876,899,708	Minions ($1,159,444,662)
1	Minions (2015)	$1,159,444,662			
2	The Rise of Gru (2022)	$940,482,695			
3	Minions & Monsters (2026) †	$530,771,768			

14	Middle-earth	$5,979,000,075	8	$747,375,009	The Lord of the Rings: The Return of the King ($1,147,997,407)
Jackson series $5,927,770,083 6 $987,961,681 The Lord of the Rings: The Return of the King ($1,147,997,407): / The Lord of the Rings / $2,995,691,652 / 3 / $998,563,884 / The Return of the King ($1,147,997,407); 1 / The Return of the King (2003) / $1,147,997,407; 2 / The Two Towers (2002) / $948,945,489; 3 / The Fellowship of the Ring (2001) / $898,748,756; / The Hobbit / $2,932,078,431 / 3 / $977,359,477 / An Unexpected Journey ($1,017,030,651); 1 / An Unexpected Journey (2012) / $1,017,030,651; 2 / The Desolation of Smaug (2013) / $959,027,992; 3 / The Battle of the Five Armies (2014) / $956,019,788
The Lord of the Rings (1978) / $30,471,420
The War of the Rohirrim (2024) / $20,758,572

15
Transformers
$5,429,275,457
9
$603,252,829
Dark of the Moon ($1,123,794,079)

	Main series	$5,418,341,368	8	$677,292,671	Dark of the Moon ($1,123,794,079)
1	Dark of the Moon (2011)	$1,123,794,079			
2	Age of Extinction (2014)	$1,104,054,072			
3	Revenge of the Fallen (2009)	$836,303,693			
4	Transformers (2007)	$709,709,780			
5	The Last Knight (2017)	$605,425,157			
6	Bumblebee (2018)	$467,989,645			
7	Rise of the Beasts (2023)	$441,656,550			
8	One (2024)	$129,408,392			

The Transformers: The Movie (1986)	$10,934,089

16	Mission: Impossible	$4,741,543,902	8	$592,692,988	Fallout ($791,657,398)
1	Fallout (2018)	$791,657,398			
2	Ghost Protocol (2011)	$694,713,380			
3	Rogue Nation (2015)	$682,716,636			
4	The Final Reckoning (2025)	$598,767,057			
5	Dead Reckoning (2023)	$571,125,435			
6	Mission: Impossible 2 (2000)	$546,388,108			
7	Mission: Impossible (1996)	$457,696,391			
8	Mission: Impossible III (2006)	$398,479,497			

17	Pirates of the Caribbean	$4,522,021,886	5	$904,404,377	Dead Man's Chest ($1,066,185,783)
1	Dead Man's Chest (2006)	$1,066,185,783			
2	On Stranger Tides (2011)	$1,045,713,802			
3	At World's End (2007)	$960,996,492			
4	Dead Men Tell No Tales (2017)	$794,861,794			
5	The Curse of the Black Pearl (2003)	$654,264,015			

18
Toy Story †
$4,444,969,723
6
$740,828,287
Toy Story 5 ($1,149,545,392)

	Main series †	$4,186,259,703	5	$837,251,941	Toy Story 5 ($1,149,545,392)
1	Toy Story 5 (2026) †	$1,149,545,392			
2	Toy Story 4 (2019)	$1,073,394,593			
3	Toy Story 3 (2010)	$1,066,970,811			
4	Toy Story 2 (1999)	$511,358,276			
5	Toy Story (1995)	$384,990,631			

Lightyear (2022)	$226,425,420

19
Shrek
$4,032,155,517
6
$672,025,920
Shrek 2 ($932,542,913)

	Main series	$2,992,838,903	4	$748,209,726	Shrek 2 ($932,542,913)
1	Shrek 2 (2004)	$932,542,913			
2	Shrek the Third (2007)	$813,367,380			
3	Shrek Forever After (2010)	$752,600,867			
4	Shrek (2001)	$494,327,743			

	Puss in Boots series	$1,039,316,614	2	$519,658,307	Puss in Boots ($554,987,477)
1	Puss in Boots (2011)	$554,987,477			
2	The Last Wish (2022)	$484,329,137			

20
The Hunger Games †
$3,542,085,662
6
$590,347,610
Catching Fire ($865,765,625)

	Main series	$2,969,436,607	4	$742,359,152	Catching Fire ($865,765,625)
1	Catching Fire (2013)	$865,765,625			
2	Mockingjay – Part 1 (2014)	$755,413,630			
3	The Hunger Games (2012)	$694,487,388			
4	Mockingjay – Part 2 (2015)	$653,769,964			

	Prequel films †	$572,649,055	2	$286,324,528	The Ballad of Songbirds & Snakes ($347,649,055)
1	The Ballad of Songbirds & Snakes (2023)	$347,649,055			
2	Sunrise on the Reaping (2026) †	$225,000,000			

^{S}Shared universes for which some properties also have their own entries.

^{*}Canada and U.S. gross only.

^{R}Distributor rental.

== See also ==
- Lists of highest-grossing films
