= Wolverine (1991 video game) =

- Developer: Software Creations
- Publisher: LJN
- Designers: Craig Houston; Kevin Edwards
- Artists: Craig Houston; Lyndon Brooke
- Composer: Geoff Follin
- Series: Wolverine
- Platform: Nintendo Entertainment System
- Release: NA: October 1991
- Genres: Action, platform
- Mode: Single-player

Wolverine is a 1991 action-platform video game developed by Software Creations and published by LJN for the NES. It is a licensed game based on the Marvel Comics superhero of the same name, as well as the X-Men.

== Story ==
Wolverine has been captured by his old foes Magneto and Sabretooth. Stranded on a deserted island, Wolverine must survive deadly enemies and traps, concluding with a battle with Magneto and Sabretooth.

== Gameplay ==
The player controls Wolverine, who has been imprisoned on a vast island, through various stages, into a final battle against Magneto and Sabretooth. Along with icons to restore health, or to gain extra lives, special icons can be located to allow other X-Men characters, such as Jubilee, Havok, and Psylocke to offer advice or temporary aid.

Wolverine's basic moves are jumping, ducking, punching, and kicking. He can bring out his claws with a push of the "Select" button, but every time the claws are used, his energy is depleted. Energy is regained by consuming food and beverages, such as hamburgers and soft drinks. If the player kills enough minor characters, Wolverine will temporarily shift into a "Berzerker" mode.

Unlike many other NES games, where the player's character is given a grace period of invulnerability after sustaining damage, Wolverine's energy is drained for as long as he is in contact with an enemy or hazard. Another difference is that at the end of a level, except for the final two, there is no boss to defeat.

== Reception ==
In a retrospective of video games featuring Wolverine, IGN mocked the NES game for not being faithful to the comics as well as its high difficulty level.
