= Wolverine in other media =

Depictions of the Marvel Comics character in media

Adaptations of Wolverine in other media
- Original source: Comics published by Marvel Comics
- First appearance: Cameo appearance: The Incredible Hulk #180 (October 1974); Full appearance: The Incredible Hulk #181 (November 1974) (October 1974)

Films and television
- Film(s): X-Men Origins: Wolverine (2009); The Wolverine (2013); Logan (2017); Deadpool & Wolverine (2024)
- Television show(s): Wolverine and the X-Men (2008); Marvel Anime: Wolverine (2011)

Audio presentations
- Podcast(s): Marvel's Wolverine; Marvel's Wastelanders

Games
- Video game(s): Wolverine (1991); Wolverine: Adamantium Rage (1994); X-Men: Wolverine's Rage (2001); X2: Wolverine's Revenge (2003); X-Men Origins: Wolverine (2009); Marvel's Wolverine (2026)

Wolverine is a fictional character appearing in American comic books published by Marvel Comics. He is one of the few X-Men characters to be included in every media adaptation of the X-Men franchise, including film, television, cartoons, anime, and podcasts.

== Television ==
Wolverine as depicted in X-Men: The Animated Series.

Wolverine as depicted in X-Men: Evolution.

- Wolverine appears in the Spider-Man and His Amazing Friends (1981) episode "A Fire-Star Is Born", voiced by William Callaway.
- Wolverine appears in X-Men: Pryde of the X-Men (1989), voiced by Patrick Pinney.
- Wolverine appears in X-Men: The Animated Series (1992), voiced by Cal Dodd.
- Wolverine appears in Spider-Man: The Animated Series (1994), voiced again by Cal Dodd.
- Wolverine appears in X-Men: Evolution (2000), voiced by Scott McNeil. This version is a combat trainer for the X-Men.
- Wolverine appears in Robot Chicken (2005), voiced by Seth Green and Luke Evans.
- Wolverine appears in Wolverine and the X-Men (2009), voiced by Steve Blum.
- Wolverine appears in The Super Hero Squad Show (2009), voiced again by Steve Blum. This version is a member of the eponymous squad, a student of the Xavier Academy, and a temporary member of the All-Captains Squad under the name Captain Canada.
- Wolverine appears in the Marvel Anime franchise (2010), voiced by Rikiya Koyama in Japanese and again by Steve Blum in English. Additionally, Milo Ventimiglia voices a young Wolverine for most of the franchise.
- Wolverine appears in the Black Panther (2010) episode "Black Panther", voiced by Kevin Michael Richardson.
- Wolverine appears in The Avengers: Earth's Mightiest Heroes (2010), voiced again by Steve Blum. This version was a member of the Howling Commandos during World War II before joining the X-Men and the New Avengers in the present.
- Wolverine appears in Marvel Superheroes: What the--?! (2010).
- Wolverine, loosely based on his Ultimate Marvel counterpart, appears in Ultimate Spider-Man (2012), voiced again by Steve Blum.
- Wolverine appears in Hulk and the Agents of S.M.A.S.H. (2013), voiced again by Steve Blum.
- Wolverine appears in Marvel Disk Wars: The Avengers (2014), voiced by Kenji Nomura in Japanese and again by Steve Blum in English.
- Wolverine appears in X-Men '97 (2024), voiced again by Cal Dodd.

== Film ==
=== Animation ===
- Wolverine appears in Hulk vs. Wolverine, voiced again by Steve Blum.
- Wolverine appears in Lego Marvel Super Heroes: Maximum Overload, voiced again by Steve Blum.
- Wolverine appears in Lego Marvel Avengers: Code Red, voiced again by Steve Blum.
- Wolverine appears in Lego Marvel Avengers: Mission Demolition, voiced again by Steve Blum.
- Wolverine appears in Lego Marvel Avengers: Strange Tails, voiced again by Steve Blum.

=== Live-action ===
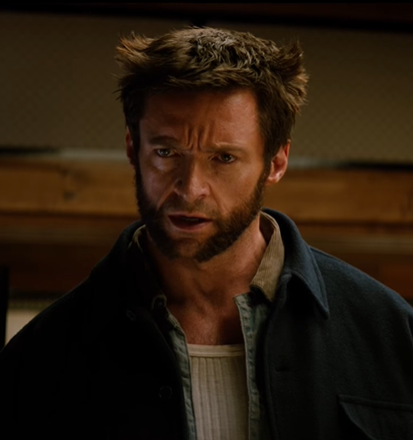
Logan / Wolverine, portrayed by Hugh Jackman, as depicted in The Wolverine.

- James "Logan" Howlett appears in 20th Century Fox's X-Men film series, portrayed by Hugh Jackman.
- An alternate universe variant of Wolverine appears in the Marvel Cinematic Universe (MCU) film Deadpool & Wolverine, portrayed again by Hugh Jackman. Additionally, a separate variant nicknamed the "Cavillrine" appears as well, portrayed by Henry Cavill.

== Video games ==
- Wolverine was meant to appear in a self-titled video game in 1989, developed by Zippo Games for Rare, before it was cancelled.
- Wolverine appears as a playable character in The Uncanny X-Men (1989).
- Wolverine appears as a playable character in X-Men: Madness in Murderworld (1989).
- Wolverine appears as a playable character in X-Men II: The Fall of the Mutants (1990).
- Wolverine appears as a playable character in a self-titled video game (1991).
- Wolverine appears as a playable character in X-Men (1992).
- Wolverine makes a cameo appearance in The Amazing Spider-Man 2 (1992).
- Wolverine appears as a playable character in Spider-Man and the X-Men in Arcade's Revenge (1992).
- Wolverine appears as a playable character in X-Men (1993).
- Wolverine appears as a playable character in X-Men (1994).
- Wolverine appears as a playable character in X-Men: Mutant Apocalypse (1994).
- Wolverine appears as a playable character in X-Men: Children of the Atom (1994), voiced again by Cal Dodd.
- Wolverine appears as a playable character in X-Men: Gamesmaster's Legacy (1995).
- Wolverine appears as a playable character in X-Men 2: Clone Wars (1995).
- Wolverine appears as a playable character in Marvel Super Heroes (1995), voiced again by Cal Dodd.
- Wolverine appears as a playable character in X-Men vs. Street Fighter (1996), voiced again by Cal Dodd.
- Wolverine appears as a playable character in X-Men: Mojo World (1996).
- Wolverine appears as a playable character in Marvel Super Heroes in War of the Gems (1996), voiced again by Cal Dodd. Additionally, clones of Wolverine appear as foot soldiers.
- Wolverine appears as a playable character in Marvel Super Heroes vs. Street Fighter (1997), voiced again by Cal Dodd.
- Wolverine appears as a playable character in X-Men: The Ravages of Apocalypse (1997).
- Wolverine appears as a playable character in Marvel vs. Capcom: Clash of Super Heroes (1998), voiced again by Cal Dodd.
- Wolverine, based on Hugh Jackman's portrayal, appears as a playable character in X-Men: Mutant Academy (2000), voiced again by Cal Dodd.
- Wolverine makes a cameo appearance in Spider-Man (2000) via a poster.
- Wolverine appears as a playable character in Marvel vs. Capcom 2: New Age of Heroes (2000), voiced again by Cal Dodd. Additionally, Wolverine with his bone claws appears as a separate character.
- Wolverine appears as a playable character in X-Men: Mutant Wars (2000).
- Wolverine appears as a playable character in X-Men: Wolverine's Rage (2001).
- Wolverine appears as a playable character in X-Men: Mutant Academy 2 (2001), voiced by Tony Daniels.
- Wolverine appears as a playable character in X-Men: Reign of Apocalypse (2001).
- Wolverine appears as an unlockable skin in Tony Hawk's Pro Skater 3 (2001).
- Wolverine appears as a playable character in X-Men: Next Dimension (2002).
- Wolverine, based on Hugh Jackman's portrayal, appears as a playable character in X2: Wolverine's Revenge (2003), voiced by Mark Hamill.
- Wolverine appears as a playable character in X-Men Legends (2004), voiced by Steve Blum.
- Wolverine appears as a playable character in X-Men Legends II: Rise of Apocalypse (2005), voiced again by Steve Blum.
- The Ultimate Marvel incarnation of Wolverine appears as a boss in Ultimate Spider-Man (2005), voiced by Keith Szarabajka.
- Wolverine appears as a playable character in Marvel Nemesis: Rise of the Imperfects (2005), voiced by David Kaye.
- Wolverine appears as a playable character in Marvel: Ultimate Alliance (2006), voiced again by Steve Blum. This version is a member of the X-Men and the New Avengers. Additionally, his modern outfit, John Byrne's tan and brown design, John Cassaday's yellow and blue design, and his Ultimate Marvel design are available as alternate skins.
- Wolverine appears as a playable character in X-Men: The Official Game (2006), voiced by Hugh Jackman.
- Wolverine appears as a boss and assist character in Spider-Man: Web of Shadows (2008), voiced again by Steve Blum.
- Wolverine appears in LittleBigPlanet (2008) via the "Marvel Costume Kit 3" DLC.
- Wolverine appears as a playable character in X-Men Origins: Wolverine (2009), voiced again by Hugh Jackman.
- Wolverine appears as a playable character in Marvel: Ultimate Alliance 2 (2009), voiced again by Steve Blum. This version is a member of the X-Men and the New Avengers. Additionally, his Secret Wars design appears as an alternate skin.
- Wolverine appears as a playable character in Marvel Super Hero Squad (2009), voiced again by Steve Blum.
- The Ultimate Marvel incarnation of Wolverine makes a non-speaking cameo appearance in Spider-Man: Shattered Dimensions (2010).
- Wolverine appears as a playable character in Marvel Super Hero Squad: The Infinity Gauntlet (2010), voiced again by Steve Blum.
- Wolverine appears as a playable character in Marvel vs. Capcom 3: Fate of Two Worlds (2011), voiced again by Steve Blum.
  - Wolverine appears as a playable character in Ultimate Marvel vs. Capcom 3 (2011), voiced again by Steve Blum.
- Wolverine appears as a non-playable character (NPC) in X-Men: Destiny (2011), voiced again by Steve Blum.
- Wolverine appears as a playable character in Marvel Super Hero Squad: Comic Combat (2011), voiced again by Steve Blum.
- Wolverine appears as a playable character in Marvel Super Hero Squad Online (2011), voiced again by Steve Blum. Additionally, his yellow and brown suit, a casual outfit, and a samurai outfit appear as alternate skins.
- Wolverine appears as a playable character in Marvel Avengers Alliance (2012).
- Wolverine appears as a playable character in Marvel Avengers: Battle for Earth (2012), voiced again by Steve Blum.
- Wolverine appears as a playable character in Marvel Heroes (2013), voiced again by Steve Blum.
- Wolverine appears as an NPC in Deadpool (2013), voiced again by Steve Blum.
- Wolverine appears as a playable character in Lego Marvel Super Heroes (2013), voiced again by Steve Blum.
- Wolverine appears as a playable character in Marvel: Avengers Alliance Tactics (2014).
- Wolverine appears as a playable character in Uncanny X-Men: The Days of Future Past (2014).
- Wolverine appears as a playable character in Marvel Contest of Champions (2014), voiced again by Cal Dodd.
- Wolverine appears as a playable character in Marvel: Future Fight (2015).
- Wolverine appears as an unlockable skin in Fortnite (2017).
- Wolverine appears as a playable character in Marvel Strike Force (2018).
- Wolverine appears as a playable character in Marvel Powers United VR (2018), voiced again by Steve Blum.
- Wolverine appears as a playable character in Marvel Ultimate Alliance 3: The Black Order (2019), voiced again by Steve Blum.
- Wolverine appears as a playable character in Marvel's Midnight Suns (2020), voiced again by Steve Blum.
- Wolverine appears in Marvel Realm of Champions (2020).
- Wolverine appears in Marvel Snap (2022).
- An alternate costume for Miles Morales, based on an alternate version of the character who became Wolverine, appears in Spider-Man 2 (2023).
- Wolverine appears as a playable character in Marvel Rivals (2024), voiced again by Steve Blum.
- Wolverine appears as a playable character in Marvel Cosmic Invasion (2025), voiced again by Cal Dodd.
- Wolverine appears as a playable character in Marvel Tōkon: Fighting Souls (2026), voiced again by Steve Blum and Rikiya Koyama in English and Japanese, respectively.
- Wolverine appears as a playable character in Marvel's Wolverine (2026), voiced and motion-captured by Liam McIntyre.

== Miscellaneous ==
- Wolverine appears in Planet X. This version formed a comradery with Worf based on their shared love of fighting.
- A Counter-Earth incarnation of Wolverine appears in the Spider-Man Unlimited tie-in comic. This version is Edwin Jones, a human who was experimented on by the High Evolutionary and partially transformed into a Bestial. Subsequently, he came to reside in Harmony, a refuge from the High Evolutionary's rule.
- Wolverine appears in the Spider-Woman: Agent of S.W.O.R.D. motion comic, voiced by Jeffrey Hedquist.
- Wolverine appears in the Astonishing X-Men motion comic, voiced initially by Marc Thompson and later by Brian Drummond.
- Wolverine appears in the Wolverine: Origin motion comic, voiced by Alessandro Juliani.
- Wolverine appears in the Ultimate Wolverine vs. Hulk motion comic, voiced again by Brian Drummond.
- Wolverine appears in the Wolverine versus Sabretooth motion comic, voiced again by Brian Drummond.
- Wolverine appears in the Wolverine: Weapon X motion comic, voiced again by Brian Drummond.
- Wolverine appears in Marvel Super Heroes 4D.
- Wolverine appears in a self-titled podcast, voiced by Richard Armitage.
  - Wolverine appears in the Spanish language adaptation of the podcast's first season, Wolverine: La Larga Noche, voiced by Joaquín Cosío.
- Wolverine appears in Marvel Universe Live!.
- Wolverine appears as part of the Marvel Minifigures Series 2 as part of the Lego Minifigures theme.

== See also ==
- X-Men in other media
