= Production of Avengers: Doomsday and Avengers: Secret Wars =

Avengers: Doomsday and Avengers: Secret Wars
- Logos for Avengers: Doomsday (top) and Avengers: Secret Wars (bottom)
- Directed by: Anthony Russo; Joe Russo
- Screenplay by: Stephen McFeely; Michael Waldron
- Based on: The Avengers by: Stan Lee; Jack Kirby
- Produced by: Kevin Feige; Louis D'Esposito; Jonathan Schwartz
- Cinematography: Newton Thomas Sigel
- Edited by: Jeffrey Ford; Matthew Schmidt
- Music by: Alan Silvestri
- Production company: Marvel Studios
- Distributed by: Walt Disney Studios; Motion Pictures
- Release dates: December 18, 2026 (Doomsday); December 17, 2027 (Secret Wars)
- Country: United States
- Language: English

Avengers: Doomsday and Avengers: Secret Wars are American superhero films based on the Marvel Comics superhero team the Avengers, produced by Marvel Studios and distributed by Walt Disney Studios Motion Pictures. They are respectively the fifth and sixth installments in the Avengers film series following Avengers: Endgame (2019), and the 39th and 40th films of the Marvel Cinematic Universe (MCU). Both films are directed by Anthony and Joe Russo from screenplays by Stephen McFeely and Michael Waldron. They feature an ensemble cast composed of many previous MCU actors, headlined by Robert Downey Jr., Chris Evans, Pedro Pascal, Anthony Mackie, Florence Pugh, Vanessa Kirby, Ebon Moss-Bachrach, Simu Liu, Joseph Quinn, and Letitia Wright. In Doomsday, the Avengers, Wakandans, Fantastic Four, New Avengers, and the X-Men team up to face Doctor Doom (Downey).

Two new Avengers films, The Kang Dynasty and Secret Wars, were announced in July 2022 as the conclusion of the MCU's Phase Six and "The Multiverse Saga". Destin Daniel Cretton was hired to direct The Kang Dynasty and Jonathan Majors was set to reprise his MCU role as the villain Kang the Conqueror. Jeff Loveness was hired to write The Kang Dynasty that September and Waldron was hired to write Secret Wars a month later. In November 2023, Cretton departed, Waldron replaced Loveness as writer of The Kang Dynasty as well, and Marvel was considering moving away from the Kang storyline in part due to Majors's legal issues; Majors was fired the following month. The return of the Russo brothers as directors and McFeely as co-writer, the casting of Downey as new villain Doctor Doom, and the new subtitle Doomsday for the first film were all announced in July 2024. Chris McKenna and Erik Sommers eventually joined to help work on the scripts.

Both films are being produced at Pinewood Studios in England. Filming for Doomsday took place from April to September 2025, and filming for Secret Wars is scheduled to begin in mid-2026. Jeffrey Ford and Matthew Schmidt are editing the films and Alan Silvestri is composing the musical score for them, both returning from previous MCU films.

Avengers: Doomsday is scheduled for release on December 18, 2026, and Avengers: Secret Wars is scheduled for release on December 17, 2027, both part of Phase Six of the MCU.

== Development ==
=== Background ===
Discussing the acquisition of 21st Century Fox by the Walt Disney Company, which saw the return of the film rights of Deadpool, the X-Men, and the Fantastic Four to Marvel Studios, Joe Russo—co-director of Avengers: Infinity War (2018) and Avengers: Endgame (2019) with his brother Anthony—said in April 2018 that it would be interesting to introduce those characters to the Marvel Cinematic Universe (MCU) using a Secret Wars film that brings together different characters and realities. Secret Wars is the name of a 1984–85 comic book crossover event written by Jim Shooter and a 2015–16 comic book storyline written by Jonathan Hickman that both follow various Marvel characters who converge on the planet Battleworld. The next month, Disney CEO Bob Iger said Marvel Studios was focusing on new characters and franchises for the MCU following Endgame, but another Avengers film could happen eventually given the popularity of the previous films. In April 2019, Infinity War and Endgame writers Christopher Markus and Stephen McFeely said they would return to write a Secret Wars film if the Russo brothers were directing it. Joe Russo discussed the idea again in July 2020, saying "to execute something on the scale of Infinity War was directly related to the dream of Secret Wars, which is even larger in scale".

Marvel Studios president Kevin Feige said in January 2021 that another Avengers film would happen eventually. In August 2021, Shooter said executives from Marvel had attempted to secure the rights to his Secret Wars storyline and he assumed they were planning a film adaptation, though Marvel would not confirm that. Discussing the future of the MCU for Variety in May 2022, Adam B. Vary said there was no sense yet of where the franchise was heading after Endgame but several of the MCU's Phase Four projects featured the multiverse and some potential "Big Bads" such as Kang the Conqueror. Jonathan Majors was cast as Kang in September 2020 for the film Ant-Man and the Wasp: Quantumania (2023). He was introduced as an alternate universe "variant" of Kang named He Who Remains in the first season of the Disney+ series Loki (2021), which introduced the multiverse to the MCU. Kang was described by Loki creator Michael Waldron as a "time-traveling, multiversal adversary" and the MCU's "next big cross-movie villain". Quantumania writer Jeff Loveness called him a "top-tier, A-list Avengers villain". Additionally, the Phase Four film Doctor Strange in the Multiverse of Madness (2022), written by Waldron, introduces the idea of "incursions"—a key idea in the 2015 Secret Wars comic—where one universe destroys another within the multiverse. Waldron compared this to introducing Thanos to the MCU long before he became the main villain of "The Infinity Saga", which covers the MCU's Phases One, Two, and Three.

=== Announcement as The Kang Dynasty and Secret Wars ===
Avengers: The Kang Dynasty logo

In July 2022, the Russo brothers reiterated that they were fans of the Secret Wars comic books, but said there were no plans for them to direct a film version. The pair added that they would have to consider the implications of such a project because it would be a "massive undertaking" and making Infinity War and Endgame had already been very difficult. At San Diego Comic-Con (SDCC) later that month, Feige announced the films Avengers: The Kang Dynasty and Avengers: Secret Wars, to be released on May 2, 2025, and November 7, 2025, respectively. They were set to conclude Phase Six of the MCU and complete "The Multiverse Saga", which covers Phases Four, Five, and Six. The first film was inspired by "Kang Dynasty", a 2001–02 comic book storyline written by Kurt Busiek in which Kang the Conqueror travels through time to enslave humanity. Feige compared the films to Infinity War and Endgame concluding the Infinity Saga. He said a lot of the Phase Four projects had been building to the larger story of The Kang Dynasty and "The Multiverse Saga", and this would continue throughout Phases Five and Six. Feige added that Majors's role as multiple variants of Kang made him a different type of villain from Thanos, and said there was "nobody's shoulders I'd rather be putting the Multiverse Saga on" than Majors's. It was later reported that Marvel Studios did not initially plan to have the next MCU saga revolve around Kang, but they decided to do so after seeing Majors's performance in the first season of Loki and in early footage from the filming of Quantumania. Feige confirmed that the Russo brothers would not be returning as directors from Infinity War and Endgame.

Destin Daniel Cretton was revealed to be directing The Kang Dynasty shortly after the SDCC announcement. He directed Shang-Chi and the Legend of the Ten Rings (2021) for Marvel Studios, and signed an overall deal with them in December 2021 that included directing a sequel to that film and developing the Disney+ series Wonder Man (2025). Cretton was only hired to direct The Kang Dynasty, unlike how the Russo brothers directed both Infinity War and Endgame. Loveness was hired to write The Kang Dynasty in September 2022, and began work two weeks later. He was surprised to be considered for the film, thinking he would be "one and done" with Quantumania, and believed Marvel Studios asked him to pitch for The Kang Dynasty because they enjoyed his take on Kang and elements he included in Quantumania that he felt would be good setup for an Avengers film. A scene with more details about Kang's backstory and future was cut from Quantumania and Loveness thought those details were better suited to be revealed in the next Avengers film. Also in September, Marvel Studios met with potential writers for Secret Wars. Waldron was considered the frontrunner and was hired to write the film in October, when its release date was pushed back to May 1, 2026. In November, Simu Liu expressed interest in reprising his role as Xu Shang-Chi from Shang-Chi and the Legend of the Ten Rings and working with Cretton again. Majors discussed The Kang Dynasty with Cretton by then, and in January 2023 he was confirmed to be appearing in Secret Wars as well. Loveness said he wanted The Kang Dynasty to feel like a "generational struggle" that would take the MCU's new characters from Phase Four and "throw them into the fire". Shang-Chi was set to be one of the lead characters at that time. In March, Loveness said the Fantastic Four and the X-Men would not appear in the film due to their MCU introductions being "pretty far away". He and Waldron pitched a scene where the Young Avengers defeat a variant of Kang, specifically "the lizard Kang from the end of" Quantumania, only to find a card that says "be patient with him, it [is] his first day as a Kang".

=== Firing of Jonathan Majors and creative shifts ===
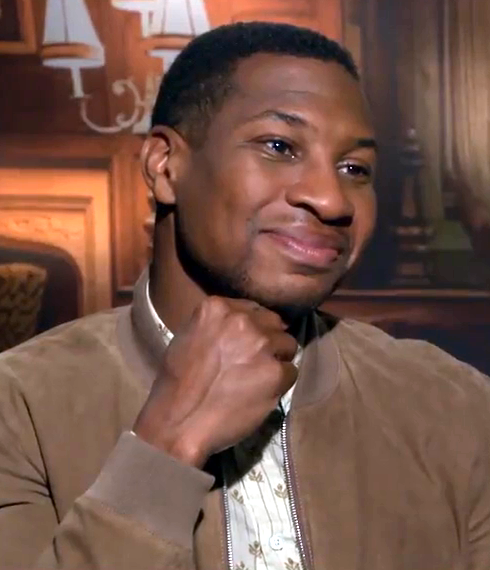
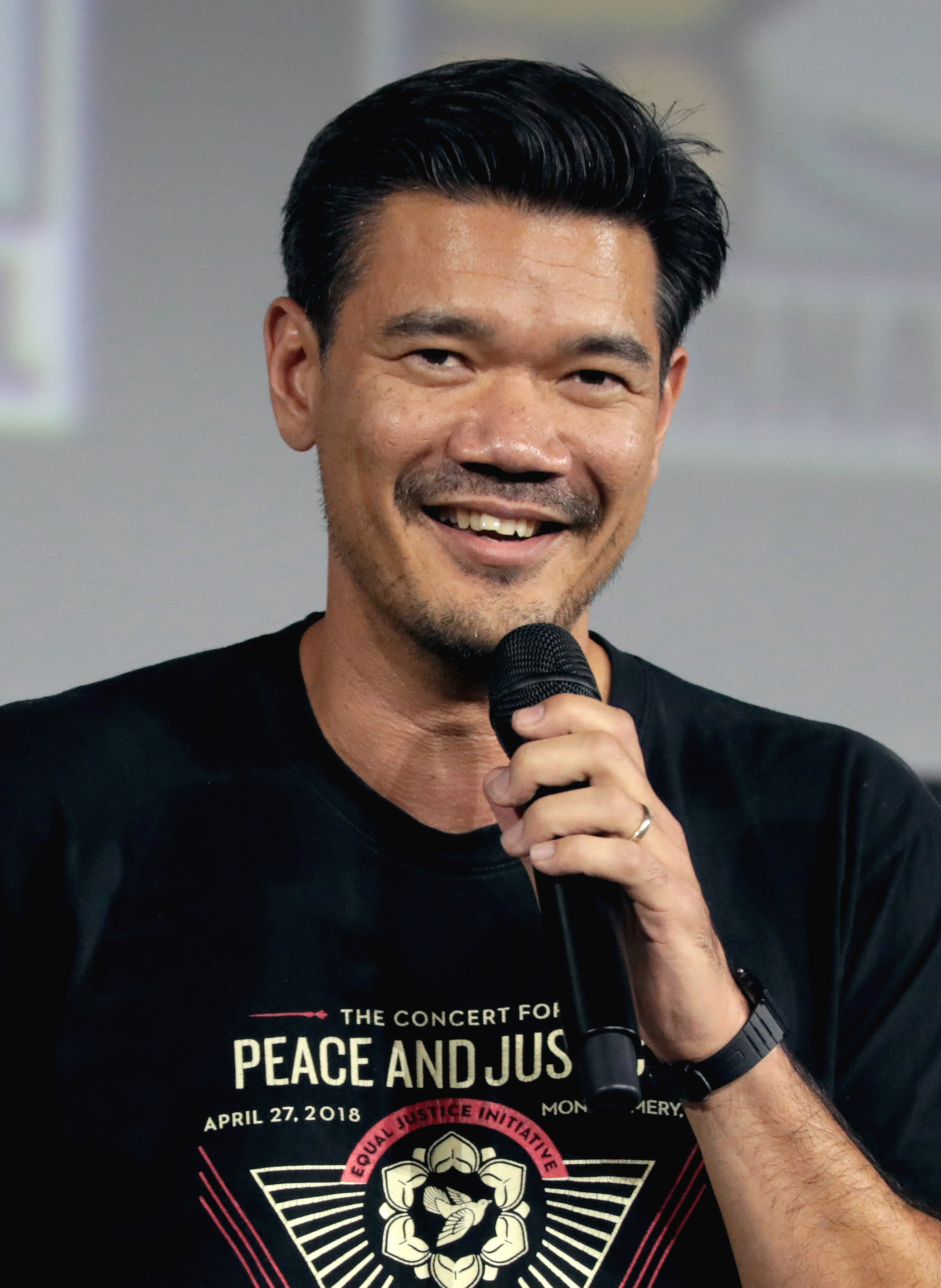
(L–R) Jonathan Majors and Destin Daniel Cretton were respectively attached to star as Kang the Conqueror and direct The Kang Dynasty, before Majors was fired in 2023, the film underwent creative shifts, and Cretton stepped down.

Following Majors's arrest in March 2023 and subsequent assault allegations, Marvel Studios had not yet discussed removing the actor from the MCU by the following month. He was still attached to star in both films, and was set to receive $20 million with back-end compensation for The Kang Dynasty. Disney was reportedly monitoring the situation. Joanna Robinson of The Ringer described the allegations against Majors as a "huge problem" for Marvel Studios that put them in an unusual position, since it was unprecedented for the studio to plan so much of the franchise on one character and actor; she argued that Majors had become a much more integral part of the Multiverse Saga than Robert Downey Jr. or Josh Brolin had been for the Infinity Saga as Tony Stark / Iron Man and Thanos, respectively. Robinson said there were conflicting reports on how the studio would proceed with the matter. By then, The Kang Dynasty was scheduled to begin filming in early 2024. Journalist Jeff Sneider reported in May that Loveness was no longer involved in the film and had exited before the start of the 2023 Writers Guild of America strike earlier that month. In June, the release dates for The Kang Dynasty and Secret Wars were pushed back to May 1, 2026, and May 7, 2027, respectively, in part due to the scripts not being ready before the strike.

Tatiana Siegel at Variety reported in November 2023 that Marvel Studios executives discussed bringing back the original Avengers cast, including Downey as Iron Man and Scarlett Johansson as Natasha Romanoff / Black Widow after those characters died in Endgame, but Feige denied this. Siegel also reported that Marvel Studios executives had started discussing alternative plans for the Multiverse Saga due to Majors's legal issues, including pivoting to focus on another comic book antagonist such as Doctor Doom; that character was already expected to be a major antagonist, if not the primary antagonist, in Secret Wars. Siegel felt replacing Majors with a new Kang actor was an option given Marvel Studios previously recast major roles in the MCU due to off-screen issues, and she reported that the final episode of Loki's second season (2023) would set-up the future role for Kang and his variants in a way that would be difficult for Marvel to change. However, when the episode was released soon after, several commentators opined that it actually downplayed Kang's future role and provided several possible solutions for Marvel, including having the Kang variants be handled by the Time Variance Authority (TVA) off-screen and potentially replacing them with Loki variants.

Also in November 2023, Robinson reported that Loveness departed The Kang Dynasty because he was closely associated with the Kang storyline and Marvel was "moving away" from that. Aaron Couch and Borys Kit, writing for The Hollywood Reporter, said Loveness completed a script draft before he left. In the middle of the month, Cretton stepped down as director of The Kang Dynasty to focus on other MCU projects. His exit was said to be amicable as he was still working on other projects with the studio, and it was partially attributed to schedule delays. Cretton later said he did not feel like the right fit for the story Marvel wanted to tell and instead went on to direct the film Spider-Man: Brand New Day (2026) for the studio. Sneider reported that Marvel now wanted a writer and a director who could develop both films as a two-part finale to the Multiverse Saga. Waldron was hired to rewrite the screenplay for The Kang Dynasty at the end of the month. In December, Majors was fired by Disney and Marvel Studios after he was found guilty of harassment and reckless assault in the third degree. It was unknown if Marvel would recast Kang or refocus their plans on a new villain, but the studio had started referring to The Kang Dynasty internally as Avengers 5. Sneider soon reported that Marvel Studios was now developing Secret Wars as a "giant five-hour movie" split into two parts, with a year between their releases, and were searching for a director they had not worked with before. Filming was delayed to late 2024 due to Majors's firing. Feige said the studio's handling of Majors's legal issues was "very delicate" and they did not want to make any rash decisions about his employment until the outcome of his trial was confirmed.

Couch and Kit reported in February 2024 that Marvel Studios started considering changes, including minimizing the role of Kang, following the disappointing box office performance of Quantumania, and the studio was now "cleaning up the creative mess" caused by that film's performance and by Majors's firing. Avengers 5 and Secret Wars were being rewritten to minimize Kang's role or remove him entirely, and Avengers 5 was being retitled to no longer reference Kang. Feige later confirmed that Majors's legal issues had accelerated their creative pivot but were not directly responsible for it. He said the studio came to feel that Kang "wasn't big enough, wasn't Thanos", and the right character to serve as the main antagonist of the Multiverse Saga was Doctor Doom, whom they finally had access to following the Fox acquisition. Feige stated that before Majors's legal issues, they planned for The Kang Dynasty to feature a bait-and-switch reveal in the second act to set-up Doom as the main antagonist of the Multiverse Saga, with Kang serving as a decoy for both the audience and the Avengers.

=== New work as Doomsday and Secret Wars ===
Commentators noted that issue #5 of the 2015 Secret Wars comic book can be seen in a trailer for the Phase Five film Deadpool & Wolverine (2024) that was released in February 2024. That film stars Ryan Reynolds as Wade Wilson / Deadpool, Hugh Jackman as Logan / Wolverine, and several other actors reprising their roles from 20th Century Fox's X-Men film series or other prior Marvel films, as part of a multiverse story that serves as a tribute to Fox's Marvel films. While completing work on Deadpool & Wolverine in mid-March, director Shawn Levy was quietly asked to direct Avengers 5. He turned down the offer due to scheduling concerns with his role as a director and executive producer on the fifth season of Stranger Things (2025). In April, filming for Avengers 5 was reported to be beginning in early 2025, after Marvel Studios delayed the production schedule by several months. The next month, Waldron turned in a new draft of the script that was given to Levy, who was still considered to be the studio's top choice to direct. Levy was in contention again following the production delay and began early discussions with the studio by the start of June. Other directors were still being considered, and Levy had yet to commit to the film due to his work on Stranger Things and the film Star Wars: Starfighter (2027).

Feige wanted Downey to return to the MCU and approached him about playing Victor von Doom / Doctor Doom before the release of Quantumania in February 2023. Downey had auditioned for Doom in Fox's film Fantastic Four (2005) before he was cast as Iron Man in the MCU. The studio made repeated offers to the actor, but Downey said he would only return if the Russo brothers also returned as directors. Feige and Downey pitched the idea to the Russos several times, but they were reluctant to return, feeling "creatively spent" by their previous MCU films. Joe Russo said the process of filming, completing, and promoting multiple MCU films within a short time period had been intense and physically exhausting for the pair. McFeely approached them with the idea that the film should show the very next scene after the ending of Endgame, which excited the Russos. Joe felt it would be risky to alter "people's emotional investment" in a successful film like Endgame, but was excited by the challenge that presented; the Russos entered early talks to direct both Avengers 5 and Secret Wars by mid-July 2024. It had become clear by then that Levy was not interested in returning to the MCU so soon after Deadpool & Wolverine. Matthew Belloni of Puck reported that talent agency Creative Artists Agency suggested Greg Berlanti and Noah Hawley to Marvel Studios as potential directors for both films, but they were turned down by Feige. Downey signed a deal to star as Doctor Doom by late July. Sneider reported that he would be introduced in the MCU film The Fantastic Four: First Steps (2025) before starring in the next Avengers films. Feige said casting Downey was a long-term plan to "take one of our greatest characters and utilize one of our greatest actors", and because the MCU was now exploring the multiverse, they could "do whatever the heck we want. He played the most iconic hero. Let's have him play the most iconic villain."

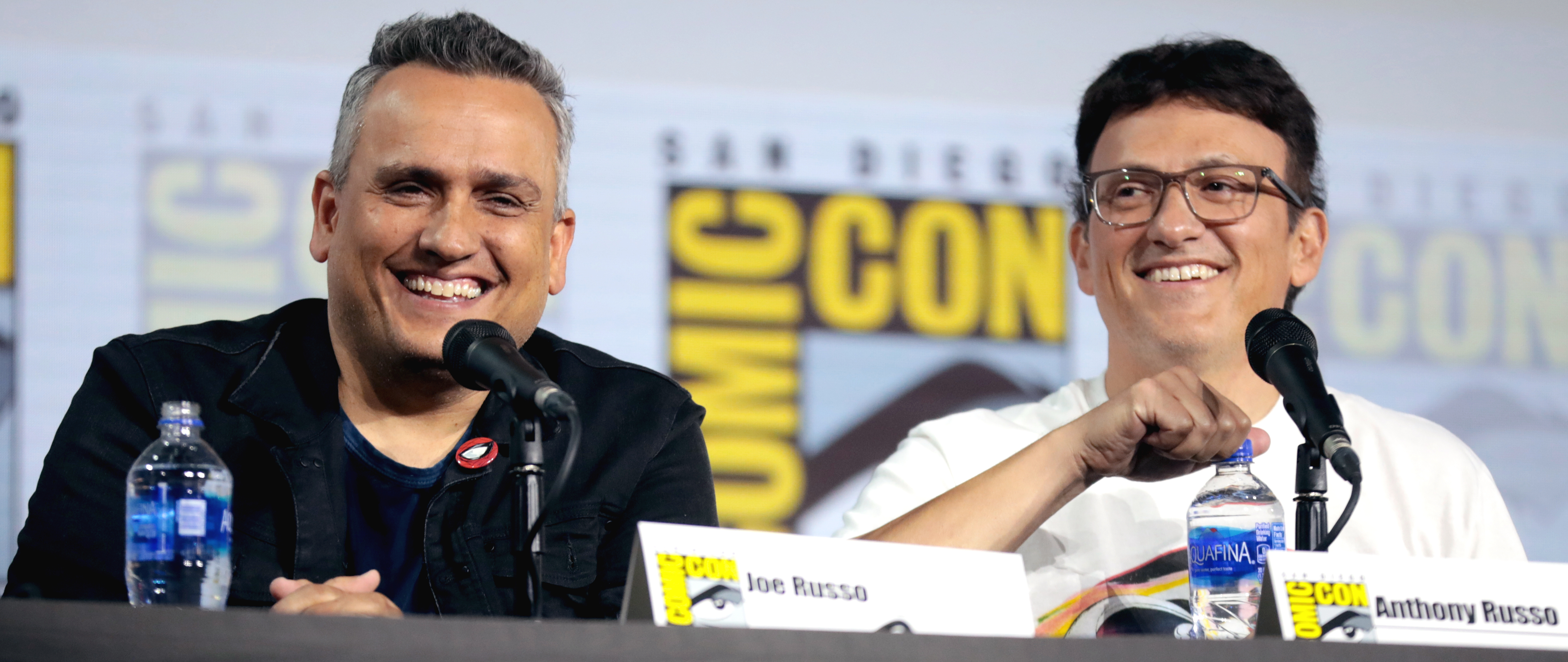
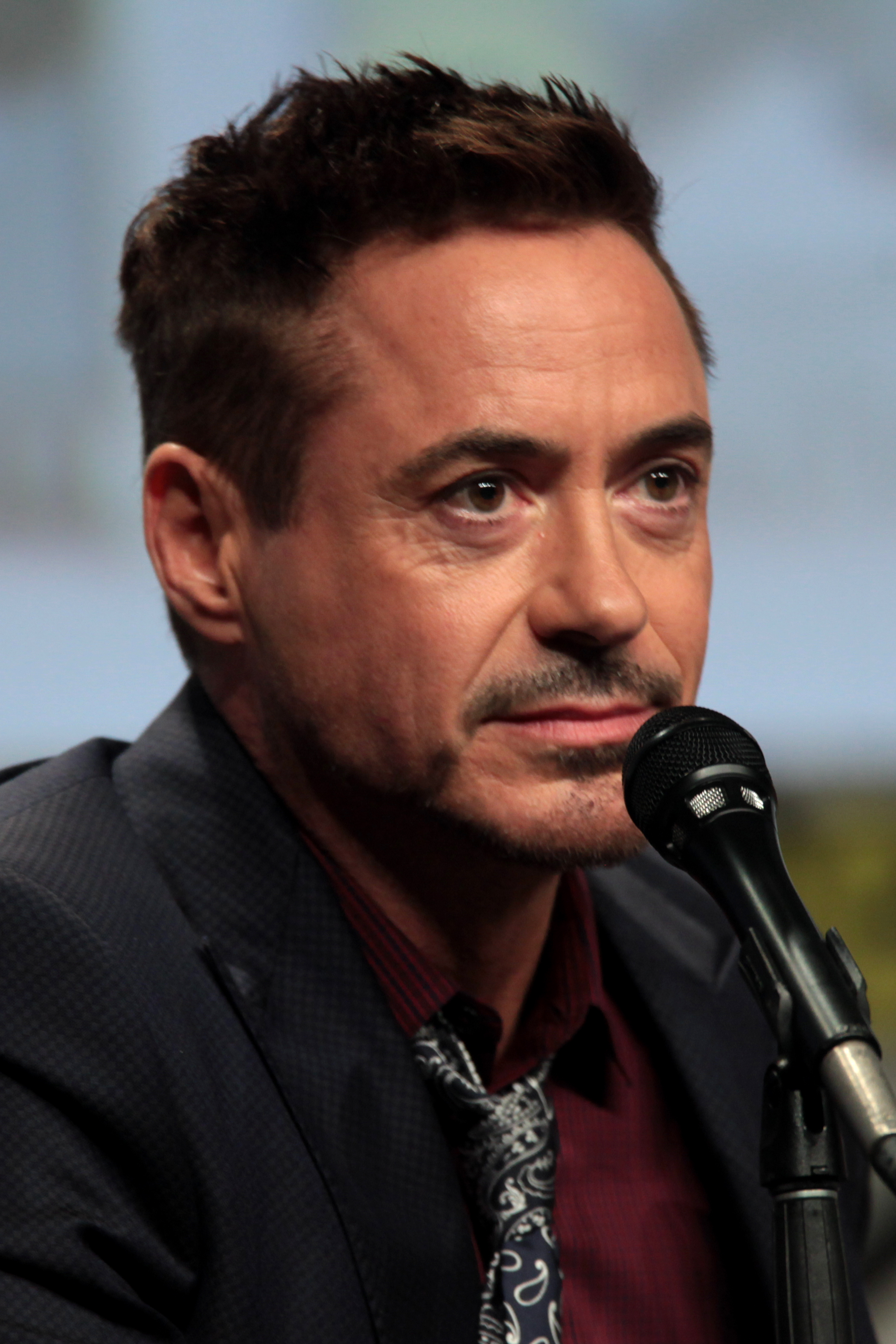
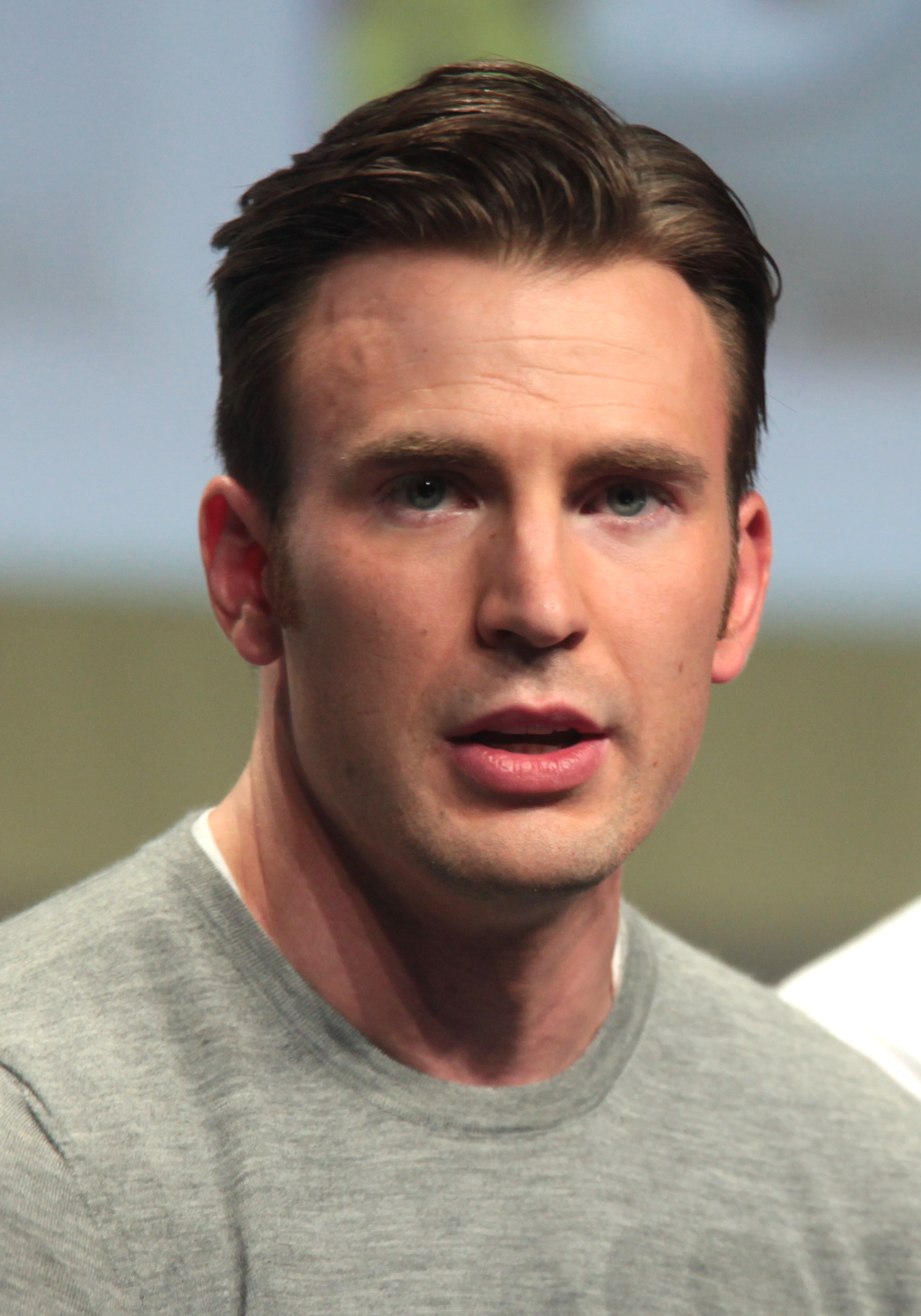
(L–R,T–B) Directors Joe and Anthony Russo and stars Robert Downey Jr. and Chris Evans all returned from previous MCU films for Doomsday and Secret Wars following the creative shifts.

At SDCC at the end of July 2024, the Russo brothers were confirmed to be directing the next two Avengers films. They revealed that Avengers 5 was now titled Avengers: Doomsday, and both films would feature Downey as Doctor Doom. They felt Doom was required to do justice to the Secret Wars story, and believed that Downey was the one person who could take on the role. McFeely had taken over as writer for both films, and filming was set to begin in early 2025 in London. Markus did not return to co-write the films, choosing to focus on running projects for the Russos' production company AGBO instead. The reunion of Marvel Studios, Downey, and the Russo brothers was considered by industry insiders to be a return to what had worked in the past and a "perfect combination of timing and everyone being on the same page".

Responding to the SDCC announcements, Majors said he was "heartbroken" over the decision to move forward on the films without him and said he was open to return to the MCU as Kang if Marvel Studios ever wanted to explore the character further. The Russos and Downey were reported to be earning $40 million and $50 million, respectively, for each film. They were expected to receive bonuses based on box office performance, with potential for Downey's salary to double. Downey also negotiated private jet travel, dedicated personal security, and multiple trailers on the film sets with personal chefs. After earning $500–600 million total for his previous MCU appearances, Downey was not expected to take a discounted salary. Neither was Thor actor Chris Hemsworth, who Belloni reported would have a major role in Doomsday and be the "second lead" after Downey. He attributed this to Marvel Studios believing they needed established stars in recognizable roles to help "eventize" the film.

In May 2025, Disney delayed the release of Doomsday to December 18, 2026, and Secret Wars to December 17, 2027, to allow more time for production to be completed. Feige revealed in July that Waldron was helping McFeely with the scripts. Chris McKenna and Erik Sommers, writers on the MCU Spider-Man films, left Brand New Day soon after Cretton joined that film in order to work on the Doomsday and Secret Wars scripts. McKenna said they were mainly focused on Secret Wars but provided "a little bit" of help on Doomsday. Justin Kroll from Deadline Hollywood reported in January 2026 that Feige had been solely focused on the needs of Doomsday and Secret Wars for the last year in a similar way to how he was focused on films during the Infinity Saga, in contrast to how stretched his attention had been during Phases Four and Five when Marvel Studios expanded to producing television for Disney+. Marvel Studios co-president Louis D'Esposito and executive Jonathan Schwartz produced Doomsday with Feige, while Marvel Studios director of production development Jenna Berger was Feige's right-hand for the productions after working on the MCU miniseries Ms. Marvel (2022).

Pre-production for Secret Wars was underway by April 2026, taking place simultaneously with post-production on Doomsday. In September, Waldron explained that he was working on the films around his commitments to the series Chad Powers (2025–present): he left to make the first season when McFeely first joined, then came back to help him; McKenna and Sommers joined the Avengers films while he was making the second season; and all four writers were working together at the time of his comments. McFeely and Waldron received final screenwriting credits for Doomsday, with McKenna and Sommers among those receiving "Additional Literary Material" credits.

== Writing ==
The Russo brothers confirmed in March 2025 that the 1984–85 Secret Wars event, which they grew up with, and the 2015–16 "Secret Wars" storyline would both serve as "loose inspiration" for the films. Feige said the films were also inspired by "Time Runs Out", the prelude storyline for the 2015–16 "Secret Wars". After several actors from Fox's X-Men film series were announced to be returning for Doomsday, there was speculation about whether the film would adapt elements from the 2012 comic book crossover event "Avengers vs. X-Men" written by Brian Michael Bendis, Matt Fraction, Jason Aaron, Ed Brubaker, and Hickman as well as Jonathan Maberry's 2010 limited series Doomwar, which depicts Doctor Doom invading Wakanda and features the X-Men. Hickman consulted on Doomsday and Secret Wars for two and a half years, reading the scripts for both films. The Western film Once Upon a Time in the West (1968) was an additional inspiration for the Russos' work on Doomsday.

Acknowledging concerns about the growing size of the MCU, the Russo brothers said they had also struggled to keep up with the large number of projects that had been released since Endgame. They wanted to restore the franchise's focus on a central narrative, which had been important to them during the Infinity Saga. Joe Russo said there would be a natural progression from Endgame to Doomsday, in addition to the latter building on the stories of the Multiverse Saga, which is why they considered the September 2026 re-release of Endgame under the name Avengers Endgame: Encore to be "required viewing" for following the new film. The new scenes included in Encore, shot specifically to appear in the re-release, include clues hinting towards the larger Doomsday story. Joe Russo also said specific lines from the original release of Endgame would have an impact on, and be "paid off" in, Doomsday.

Doomsday features groups of heroes from three different universes—the Avengers, Wakandans, and New Avengers from Earth-616; the Fantastic Four from Earth-828; and the "original" X-Men from Earth-10005—converging amidst the collapse of the multiverse. Feige said they were using the Secret Wars idea of different universes colliding to unite cast members from different film franchises and bring together multiple generations of Marvel fans. He said it was a long-time dream for Marvel to bring the Fantastic Four and the X-Men into the MCU, and it was surreal for him to see these characters together after working on Marvel films for 25 years. Feige added that one of their goals for the two films was to give closure to Marvel storylines that pre-dated the MCU, including those of the Fox X-Men characters.

Feige said the fun of the Avengers films was bringing together different characters and seeing how they get along. He added that Doomsday would be exploring the X-Men much more after Deadpool & Wolverine only "scratched the surface". Bob Reynolds / Sentry actor Lewis Pullman said each character in the film gets their own moment and there are some exciting character pairings. Namor actor Tenoch Huerta said Doomsday would be about the various characters colliding and then dealing with specific tasks to survive. As they began work on the story and scripts for the films, the Russo brothers visited the sets of The Fantastic Four: First Steps and viewed early cuts of scenes with director Matt Shakman. He said this allowed him to "pass the baton to them and [ensure that the Fantastic Four characters] would be well cared for". After comments by Shakman about his approach to Reed Richards / Mister Fantastic led to misconceptions about that character becoming the leader of the Avengers in Doomsday, Siegel clarified that Richards would have an integral role in the films but not as the "centerpiece". Ben Grimm / The Thing actor Ebon Moss-Bachrach said he was given a Doomsday script, but it did not have a completed third act or ending which he believed were reserved for select production members. Moss-Bachrach added that much of the script changed during filming.

The concept was [the final scene in Endgame with Steve Rogers is] a very happy ending for one character. And what if happiness is finite, and what if you have to take happiness from someone else to create your own happiness... What happens in that story? That's where I went, 'Right, I know what to do with this.' The idea that like there was a cost to a happy ending.

— Co-director Joe Russo on writer Stephen McFeely's pitch for Doomsday to continue the final scene of Endgame

The Russo brothers said Doom was one of the most complex comic book characters, and it was challenging adapting him because "his power is so immense and so beyond". However, they felt free to explore "where the complexities and the vulnerabilities are", and Joe said Doom hits the "sweet spot" of balancing original elements for their story with "the most awesome things about Doom in the comics", which is the approach they try to take with adapting any character from Marvel Comics. When revealing the return of Chris Evans's character Steve Rogers for Doomsday following his "definitive ending" in Endgame, the Russos called him "the character that changed our lives... it was always going to come back" to his story. They said Rogers's central role in the previous Avengers films and overall MCU story had been very personal to them, and they felt the correct way for them to return to the MCU would be to continue his story. Joe Russo said the creative team were excited to be working on the films because the story they came up with had integral roles for both Downey and Evans. Anthony Russo said the extended ending of Encore, where Rogers and Peggy Carter are visited by the variant of Loki from the Loki series, was "where Doomsday was born", as it was the original pitch from McFeely. Evans explained that he received numerous pitches from Marvel Studios to continue appearing as Rogers after Endgame, specifically showing him take the mantle Nomad as in the comics, but these pitches "never quite felt right" to Evans to justify a return until he heard the pitch for Doomsday from the Russos and Downey. He described Rogers's character arc in the film as "brutal" and said the Russo brothers enjoyed the character's resilience.

Doomsday is set fourteen months after Thunderbolts* and four years after the main events of First Steps, at the same time as the latter's mid-credits scene which introduces Doom. In April 2025, Sam Wilson / Captain America actor Anthony Mackie said Doomsday would have a cliffhanger ending and added that "everyone is expendable". Feige said Doomsday would lead into Secret Wars, but the relationship between the two films would be different from the connection between Infinity War and Endgame, with Doomsday and Secret Wars having distinct genres. Joe Russo said Secret Wars would have "a really unique world". Though Doomsday and Secret Wars are the conclusion of the Multiverse Saga, the Russos saw the two films as a new beginning for the MCU in contrast with the ending story they told with Infinity War and Endgame. Feige reiterated this, saying "Endgame, literally, was about endings. Secret Wars is about beginnings."

The book MCU: The Reign of Marvel Studios (2023) by Robinson, Dave Gonzales, and Gavin Edwards, includes a quote from Feige which Robinson felt implied Secret Wars would be a soft reboot of the MCU, allowing Marvel Studios to keep what was working, remove what was not, and bring back characters that audiences thought were "gone forever". Feige said in November 2024 that characters from Fox's X-Men films would continue to appear in the MCU leading up to Secret Wars, which would introduce a "new age of mutants and of the X-Men"; The Wall Street Journal reported that Doomsday and Secret Wars would introduce a new version of the X-Men to the MCU and Feige had a ten-year plan for those characters. In July 2025, Feige confirmed that Secret Wars would "reset" the MCU with a new "singular timeline", a recast X-Men team, and possibly other MCU characters being recast. He felt the latter was inevitable. Feige avoided using the term "reboot", calling it a "scary word" that means different things to different people. A year later he reiterated that Secret Wars would "establish a streamlined, simplified, single universe that audiences can keep up with. Some things will be familiar, but many, many things will be entirely new." Feige said Secret Wars was "as ambitious a project as we've ever embarked on".

== Pre-production ==
=== Casting ===
In June 2024, Deadline Hollywood described the first of the two films as more of an ensemble than the prior Avengers films, which mostly focused on a core group of Avengers. There was potential for more than 60 actors to reprise their MCU roles in the film, including established characters from the Infinity Saga alongside newer ones from the Multiverse Saga, though Feige cautioned that not all of the new Multiverse Saga characters would be able to appear in the two films. Similar to Infinity War and Endgame, magnetic baseball cards were used to track which characters and actors were available for the films.

Benedict Cumberbatch said in June 2024 that he would reprise his MCU role as Dr. Stephen Strange in the first film. The next month, Sneider reported that Jeremy Renner would reprise his MCU role as Clint Barton / Hawkeye in Doomsday, but Renner denied his involvement in October 2026. At SDCC later in July 2024, Robert Downey Jr.'s casting as Victor von Doom / Doctor Doom for both films was announced. He discussed changing from Tony Stark / Iron Man to Doom, saying he enjoyed portraying complex characters and his role in the films was "new mask, same task". Different storylines within Marvel Comics have seen Stark and Doom swap bodies, and Doom takes on the Iron Man mantle in the 2016–17 Infamous Iron Man comic book series by Bendis and Alex Maleev. The announcement of Downey's casting led to speculation about whether he would be playing an alternate universe variant of Stark or if his recasting would be ignored in the films' story. Feige later clarified that Doom is not a variant of Stark, although Downey drew parallels between the two characters. Also at the convention, cast members from the MCU films Thunderbolts* and The Fantastic Four: First Steps were said to be reprising their roles in the next two Avengers films, including the main Fantastic Four actors: Pedro Pascal as Reed Richards / Mister Fantastic, Vanessa Kirby as Sue Storm / Invisible Woman, Joseph Quinn as Johnny Storm / Human Torch, and Ebon Moss-Bachrach as Ben Grimm / The Thing. Tom Holland, who was also expected to reprise his MCU role as Peter Parker / Spider-Man in Doomsday, said he knew about Downey's casting as Doom before the SDCC announcement.

In November 2024, Feige said the studio was looking for ways to include Ryan Reynolds's Wade Wilson / Deadpool and Hugh Jackman's Logan / Wolverine in future MCU projects following Deadpool & Wolverine. The next month, Chris Evans, Anthony Mackie, and Hayley Atwell were reported to be in Doomsday, with Mackie and Atwell reprising their respective MCU roles as Sam Wilson / Captain America and Peggy Carter. It was unclear what Evans's role would be after he played Steve Rogers / Captain America in the Infinity Saga and a variant of Johnny Storm / Human Torch in Deadpool & Wolverine, reprising the latter role from Fox's films Fantastic Four and Fantastic Four: Rise of the Silver Surfer (2007). Sneider reported that Evans might play a version of Nomad, a mantle taken on by Rogers and other characters in the comics. Marvel attempted to develop a separate film with Evans and Atwell before deciding Doomsday would be a better film to revisit them in. Evans denied that he would be in the film, saying he was "happily retired" from Marvel. In January 2025, Sneider reported that Marvel Studios was casting an alternate version of T'Challa / Black Panther for multiple MCU projects starting with Doomsday. The character was originally portrayed in the MCU by Chadwick Boseman until his death in August 2020. Sneider said the studio offered the role to an actor in late 2024, but they declined and took on a different superhero role. He later said the casting was for T'Challa's son T'Challa II / Toussaint, who would become the new Black Panther. The character was introduced as a child in the film Black Panther: Wakanda Forever (2022), portrayed by Divine Love Konadu-Sun. Cumberbatch said he would no longer appear in Doomsday following changes to the story after Majors's firing, but he soon said he had been mistaken and would appear in both films, with a central role in Secret Wars. Mackie said he would also be in both films.

With the start of production at the end of March 2025, Marvel officially announced 26 cast members for Doomsday. Actors returning from previous MCU media included Chris Hemsworth (who portrays Thor in the MCU), Kirby, Mackie, Sebastian Stan (Bucky Barnes / Winter Soldier), Letitia Wright (Shuri / Black Panther), Paul Rudd (Scott Lang / Ant-Man), Wyatt Russell (John Walker / U.S. Agent), Tenoch Huerta Mejía (Namor), Moss-Bachrach, Simu Liu (Xu Shang-Chi), Florence Pugh (Yelena Belova / Black Widow), Lewis Pullman (Bob Reynolds / Sentry), Danny Ramirez (Joaquin Torres / Falcon), Quinn, David Harbour (Alexei Shostakov / Red Guardian), Winston Duke (M'Baku), Hannah John-Kamen (Ava Starr / Ghost), Tom Hiddleston (Loki), Channing Tatum (Remy LeBeau / Gambit), and Pascal. Several actors from Fox's X-Men film series were also announced to be returning: Kelsey Grammer (who portrayed Hank McCoy / Beast in those films), Patrick Stewart (Charles Xavier / Professor X), Ian McKellen (Erik Lehnsherr / Magneto), Alan Cumming (Kurt Wagner / Nightcrawler), Rebecca Romijn (Raven Darkhölme / Mystique), and James Marsden (Scott Summers / Cyclops). Stewart and Grammer previously reprised their X-Men roles in the MCU films Doctor Strange in the Multiverse of Madness (2022) and The Marvels (2023), respectively. Doomsday marks Stewart's final on-screen performance following his death in October 2026. Marsden said he had a general meeting with the creatives about his involvement without being given an actual script to consider. After the announcement, Downey and Marvel Studios teased that there were more cast members to reveal for Doomsday. Couch and Kit reported that Marvel had only revealed approximately half of the film's cast and noted the absence of some previously reported actors, such as Holland and Evans. They said Evans was expected to appear in at least one of the two films, while Atwell was reported to have signed a deal to star in both films. Sneider reported that Brand New Day would take place concurrently with the events of Doomsday and he did not expect Holland to appear in the latter film as a result.

In May 2025, photos with Doomsday cast members in Bahrain revealed that Mabel Cadena and Alex Livinalli were also returning for the film, in their respective MCU roles as Namora and Attuma. In August, Ryan Reynolds posted an image on Instagram of the Avengers logo vandalized by graffiti, reminiscent of a logo seen in Deadpool & Wolverine, leading to speculation that he was teasing Deadpool's role in Doomsday and Secret Wars. Couch and Kit reported through The Hollywood Reporter's Heat Vision newsletter that Deadpool would appear in Doomsday, while Anthony D'Alessandro of Deadline Hollywood reported that Reynolds was not set to appear in the two Avengers films, had not been seen on the Doomsday set, and had posted the fan-made logo because it intrigued him and he was "just having some fun". Umberto Gonzalez of TheWrap discussed these conflicting reports, questioning The Hollywood Reporter's confidence in its sources while noting that Reynolds not appearing on set did not mean he would not be in the film. Gonzalez reported that Reynolds would appear as Deadpool in Doomsday, but said sources were not yet ready to go on the record confirming this. Reynolds said he posted the image because it was his favorite design of the flag from Deadpool & Wolverine.

With the release of Doomsday's first set of teasers in December 2025, Evans was confirmed to be reprising his role as Rogers, and India Rose Hemsworth was revealed to be reprising her role as Thor's adopted daughter Love from the film Thor: Love and Thunder (2022). In January 2026, X-Men comic book writer Chris Claremont stated that Famke Janssen would return as Jean Grey from Fox's X-Men films, although it was unclear which film she would appear in; Janssen had previously denied that she would reprise her role in Doomsday and said Marvel Studios never reached out to her after she last appeared as Grey in the film X-Men: Days of Future Past (2014). In June 2026, Janssen reiterated that she would not appear in Doomsday, stating that Marvel "made a mistake" by not asking her to return. A trailer for Doomsday shown at Disney's CinemaCon panel in April 2026 revealed that Kathryn Newton reprised her role as Cassie Lang from Quantumania, and Newton confirmed her return shortly after. Wesley Holloway was also announced to be part of the cast.

At SDCC in July 2026, Atwell was officially confirmed to be returning as Carter for Doomsday, and Reynolds made an appearance dressed in a version of the Deadpool suit to jokingly ask for a role in the film; whether he actually has a role in Doomsday was not explicitly confirmed. Similarly, Reynolds and Jackman both appeared during Disney's D23 convention in August via a video message, with Jackman jokingly offering to join the film alongside Reynolds. These two promotional appearances were seen by some as confirmation, or at least a strong indication, that Reynolds and Jackman would be appearing in Doomsday, which was further supported by the pair receiving "Additional Literary Material" writing credits for the film, which was interpreted as indication that they provided dialogue for their own appearances.

The new scenes featured in Encore include appearances by Mark Ruffalo as Bruce Banner / Hulk, Owen Wilson as Mobius M. Mobius, Ke Huy Quan as Ouroboros, Eugene Cordero as Casey, James Dryden as Ralph, and Tara Strong as the voice of Miss Minutes. The Russos would not explicitly confirm Ruffalo's appearance in the film based on his Encore scene, but said Banner was "involved in the story that revolves around Doom". At that time, the Russos also confirmed that the film's full cast had yet to be revealed. In October, Sandra Hüller was revealed to have a cameo appearance in Doomsday. A mid-credits scene in the series finale of the miniseries VisionQuest, released a month before Doomsday, shows Doom finding Elizabeth Olsen's Wanda Maximoff / Scarlet Witch after she collapsed Mount Wundagore in Multiverse of Madness; some commentators expected the character to appear in Doomsday, potentially as one of the Latverian witches who serve Doom, and there was speculation that her possible appearance could be part of an adaptation of the 2010–2012 Young Avengers miniseries, Avengers: The Children's Crusade.

Sadie Sink was revealed in November 2025 to be appearing in Secret Wars after being cast as Jean Grey for Brand New Day. In the following months, Wright and Liu said they would respectively return as Shuri and Shang-Chi in Secret Wars after appearing in Doomsday, while Paul Bettany said he would reprise his MCU role as Vision in Secret Wars. In June, Evans confirmed that he was also returning for Secret Wars. The following month, Sneider reported that Ryan Gosling would appear in Secret Wars as Johnny Blaze / Ghost Rider, ahead of his solo film Ghost Rider (2028). In September, Noah Jupe was cast in a "key" role for Secret Wars, and Pugh was confirmed to also be returning for the film. In October, Samuel L. Jackson said he was not in Doomsday but he would reprise his MCU role as Nick Fury in Secret Wars.

=== Design ===
Gavin Bocquet was set as the production designer for Doomsday, reteaming with the Russo brothers after working on the second season of their television series Citadel (2023–present). Sets for the Baxter Building that Kasra Farahani designed for First Steps were reused, with some updates, for Doomsday. Doomsday features similar sets to those featured in the Fox X-Men films.

Costume designers Judianna Makovsky and Graham Churchyard returned for Doomsday and Secret Wars, respectively, from previous MCU films. The X-Men characters wear costumes based on designs from the comics. For example, Cyclops dons a comics-accurate yellow and blue suit based on Jim Lee's "classic" design, without the yellow trunks, while Xavier's grey jacket with a black-and-red X symbol is based on the design seen in Grant Morrison and Frank Quitely's New X-Men (2001–2004) comic book series. Namor also wears a comics-accurate black suit with shimmering blue scales and a high collar, reminiscent of the character's moisture suit first seen in Sub-Mariner vol. 1 #67 (November 1973). Additionally, the character no longer has the facial piercings he wore in Wakanda Forever. The Russo brothers said Doom's costume was their favorite to date, feeling the character and the costume "really, really fit" each other.

=== Filming plan ===
In October 2024, the Russo brothers said Doomsday and Secret Wars were being produced together in a similar way to Infinity War and Endgame, but they would not be filmed back-to-back like those films were; there were just four weeks between the end of filming for Infinity War and the start of filming for Endgame. Anthony said there would be around a year between the end of filming on Doomsday and the start of filming on Secret Wars. Joe later said the two films were being made "fairly back-to-back". In early 2025, filming for Doomsday was reported to be taking place from that March to August. Mackie said he would be splitting his time between filming Doomsday in London and filming the television series 12 12 12 in Budapest, and the Russos said filming would primarily occur on soundstages and specifically chosen locations to avoid set photos from leaking.

== Filming ==
Production for the two films is based at Pinewood Studios in Buckinghamshire, England. Some "pre-photography" filming for Doomsday occurred in April 2025, including the filming of the Thunderbolts* post-credits scene with the New Avengers cast. The Russos filmed the scene accompanied by Thunderbolts* director Jake Schreier. The Russos also directed the mid-credits scene of First Steps and the new scenes featured in Endgame: Encore during production on Doomsday. Principal photography for Doomsday began on April 28, under the working title Apple Pie 1. Production was originally expected to begin in early 2024, but this was delayed due to Majors's firing and the films' creative shifts. Cinematographer Newton Thomas Sigel reteamed with the Russo brothers after working on Citadel and their film Cherry (2021). Due to the creative shifts, filming began without a finished script. The Russos suggested that they were not concerned about this since they usually change the scripts for their films during rehearsals with the actors.

By the end of May 2025, location filming was taking place in Bahrain. Four days of filming were set to occur at Windsor Great Park in mid-to-late June, where sets for a spaceship and a 1960s-style bungalow were built. The latter was referred to as the "Luke Cage house"; "Luke Cage" was the codename used for Evans in the script and by the production team to help keep his return for the film a secret. An additional day of filming was set to occur at Windsor Great Park in August, with a set being built that was referred to as "Annie Reynolds's house". By late July, the cast of First Steps had finished filming half of their scenes, and Romijn had filmed some scenes. She was unsure if she would have to film more because the script was still being written. Pascal and Cumming finished filming their scenes by early August. Cumming said his schedule for the series The Traitors (2023–present) meant he was not available when some of his Doomsday scenes were being shot, so all of his scenes were shot together using green screens and other techniques, alongside some "little scenes" where he acted with other people. Wright also confirmed she wrapped filming in late August. After he was injured on set, Tatum had to rely on his stunt double for action sequences. Filming also took place at Shinfield Studios in Berkshire, England. Filming for Doomsday wrapped on September 19.

Principal photography for Secret Wars is scheduled to begin in late 2026, around a year after filming for Doomsday was completed, and last for approximately six months. At the end of July 2026, Anthony Russo said filming would begin "soon". Moss-Bachrach was expected to begin filming in August 2026, after his run starring in the Broadway play Dog Day Afternoon (2026). Mackie planned to finish his filming for Secret Wars after his run starring in the 2027 Broadway production of Macbeth, which is scheduled to begin in late March or early April and run until July 2027.

== Post-production ==
=== Editing ===
Jeffrey Ford and Matthew Schmidt are editing both films, after working on previous MCU media. In March 2025, the Russo brothers estimated that Doomsday would be approximately two-and-a-half hours long and Secret Wars would be approximately three hours long. With Doomsday's premium large format tickets going on sale in July 2026, a 165-minute runtime was set to allow for theaters to schedule showtimes, with The Hollywood Reporter noting the film's final cut was "unlikely to be locked this far in advance" and could only change within a small margin given showtimes were being scheduled against the 165-minute runtime. Shortly after, the Russos said they were "deep" in editing but had not finished the film and were continuing to shape it and find new moments, and that the runtime would be "substantial". In November 2026, Omelete reported that the film would have a runtime of 150 minutes, with Infinity Vision versions having one additional minute of footage.

=== Additional photography ===
The Hollywood Reporter reported that there would be a "healthy" amount of additional photography for Doomsday, which was expected to take place in early 2026. Harbour said he was returning to London soon after February 2026 for the reshoots, and Duke confirmed in May that additional photography had been taking place. The next month, Harbour said reshoots with himself and other Avengers actors had been taking place at Pinewood in London.

=== Music ===
In April 2024, Alan Silvestri indicated that he could be composing the music for an upcoming MCU project after doing so for Infinity War, Endgame, and other MCU films. That July, he was confirmed to be returning for both Doomsday and Secret Wars.

== See also ==
- Marketing of Avengers: Doomsday
- Production of Avengers: Infinity War and Avengers: Endgame
