= Marketing of Avengers: Doomsday =

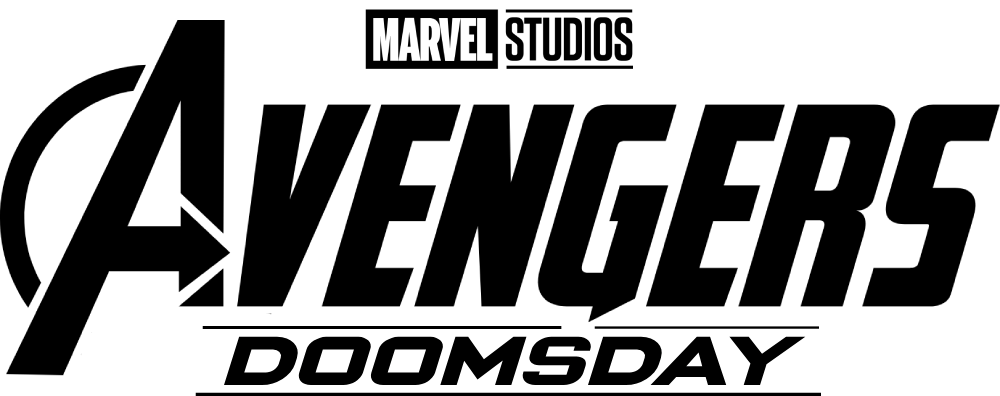

Avengers: Doomsday is an upcoming American superhero film based on the Marvel Comics superhero team the Avengers. Produced by Marvel Studios and distributed by Walt Disney Studios Motion Pictures, it is intended to be the sequel to Avengers: Endgame (2019) and the 39th film in the Marvel Cinematic Universe (MCU). Directed by Anthony and Joe Russo, and written by Stephen McFeely and Michael Waldron, the film features an ensemble cast led by Robert Downey Jr. as Doctor Doom. In the film, the Avengers, Wakandans, New Avengers, Fantastic Four, and the X-Men converge from different universes to face Doom.

Following the announcement of Downey's casting and other details at San Diego Comic-Con (SDCC) in July 2024, several unique marketing stunts were used for Doomsday. Many cast members were announced as part of a nearly five-and-a-half-hour-long livestream in March 2025 which became the most viewed cross-platform livestream stunt. Four short teasers premiered in theaters ahead of showings for the film Avatar: Fire and Ash (2025), including one that revealed the return of Chris Evans in his MCU role of Steve Rogers. These teasers were leaked upon their debuts, which Marvel had expected, and were officially released online soon after. The first full trailer debuted at CinemaCon in April 2026, and was met with mixed responses when it was released online in July. A "special look" focusing on Doom received more positive responses when it was released in August, after being shown at SDCC 2026 and Disney's D23 convention. A common element of the teasers and trailers is a clock counting down to the film's release on December 18, 2026.

In September 2026, Marvel Studios re-released Endgame as Avengers Endgame: Encore, with additional footage shot during the production of Doomsday that connected the two films. The companion podcast Countdown to Doomsday was released from August through December, revisiting key MCU films leading up to Doomsday. The film also had numerous brand partnerships and merchandise releases.

== Initial convention announcements ==
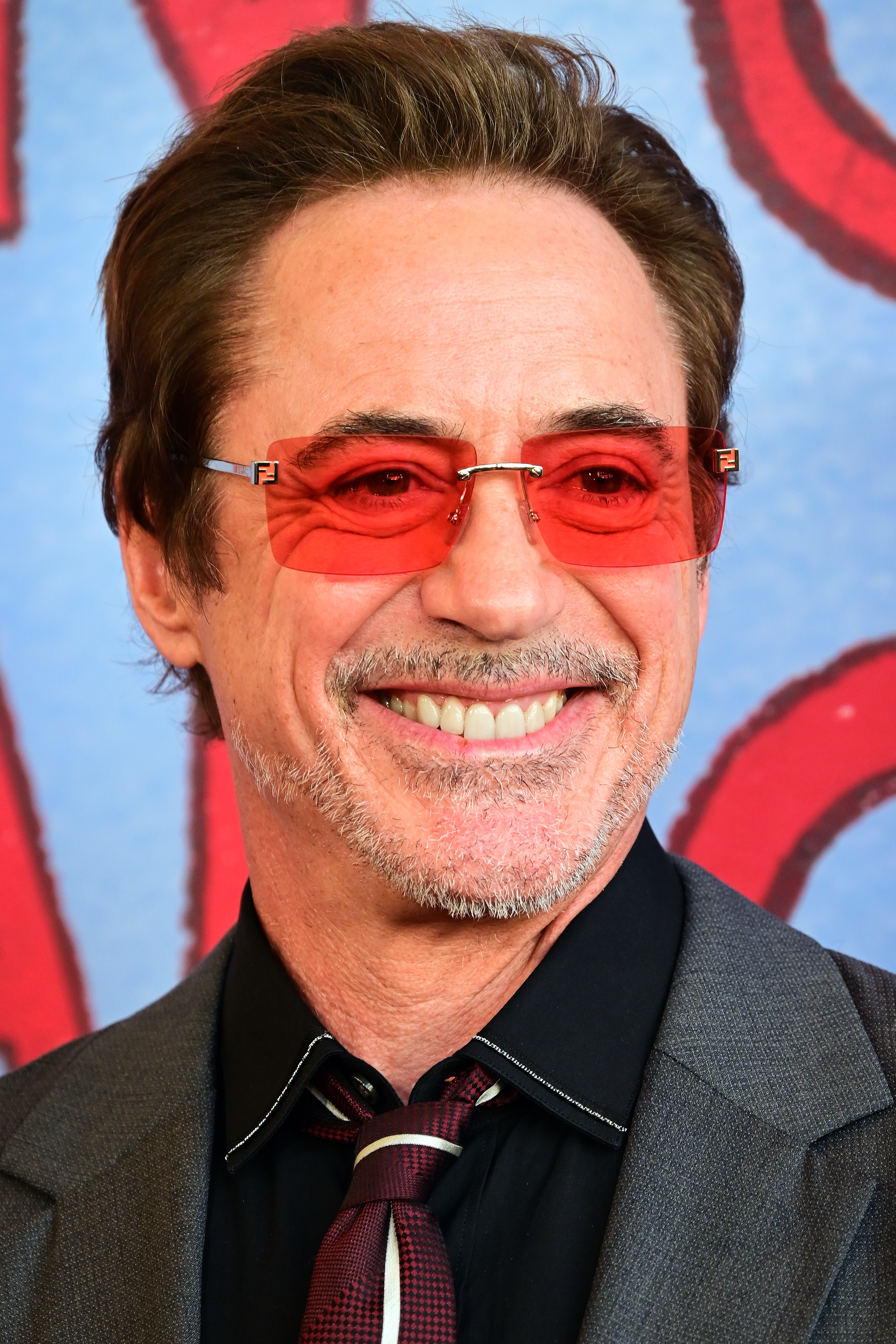
The casting of Robert Downey Jr. as Victor von Doom / Doctor Doom was announced at San Diego Comic-Con in July 2024.

At San Diego Comic-Con (SDCC) in July 2022, Marvel Studios president Kevin Feige announced the crossover films Avengers: The Kang Dynasty and Avengers: Secret Wars. They were set to conclude "The Multiverse Saga", which covers Phases Four, Five, and Six of the Marvel Cinematic Universe (MCU). The first film was inspired by "Kang Dynasty", a 2001–02 comic book storyline written by Kurt Busiek in which Kang the Conqueror travels through time to enslave humanity. The second film was inspired by Secret Wars, a 1984–85 comic book crossover event written by Jim Shooter, and "Secret Wars", a 2015–16 comic book storyline written by Jonathan Hickman; both follow various Marvel Comics characters who converge on the planet Battleworld. Jonathan Majors was cast as Kang for several Phase Four projects, and was confirmed to be starring in both new Avengers films, but he was later fired by Disney and Marvel after he was found guilty of harassment and reckless assault in the third degree. By late 2023, the films were being reworked to minimize Kang's role or remove him entirely, with rewrites by Michael Waldron.

At SDCC in July 2024, Marvel announced that The Kang Dynasty had been renamed Avengers: Doomsday. Both films were set to be directed by Anthony and Joe Russo and co-written by Stephen McFeely, all returning from previous MCU films including the last two Avengers films, Avengers: Infinity War (2018) and Avengers: Endgame (2019). Additionally, Robert Downey, Jr.—who starred as Tony Stark / Iron Man in "The Infinity Saga", covering the MCU's Phases One, Two, and Three—was announced to be portraying the new main antagonist, Victor von Doom / Doctor Doom. The announcement involved multiple people appearing on stage dressed as Doom, including Downey who unmasked himself to reveal his casting to the audience. The reunion of Marvel Studios, Downey, and the Russo brothers was considered by industry insiders to be a return to what had worked in the past and a "perfect combination of timing and everyone being on the same page". Release dates for the two films were set later, with Doomsday scheduled for release on December 18, 2026, and Secret Wars on December 17, 2027.

Downey's casting led to speculation about whether his Doom is an alternate universe "variant" of Stark, or if the films would ignore his previous role. Stark and Doom have swapped bodies in the comics, and Doom takes on the Iron Man mantle in the 2016–17 Infamous Iron Man comic book series by Brian Michael Bendis and Alex Maleev. Kat Bailey at IGN described the announcement of Downey's casting as "one of the most dramatic reveals in recent Marvel history". She reported on mixed responses from fans, with some praising Downey's return while others thought it was a desperate move from Marvel Studios following Majors's firing. Charles Pulliam-Moore of The Verge saw the casting as "Marvel betting that it might be able to win audiences back with another massive cinematic event built around a person whose face and voice have long since become synonymous with Iron Man". Other commentators discussed the casting and mixed responses, including Collider's Collier Jennings who criticized the casting of a non-Romani actor considering the character is traditionally depicted as Romani in the comic books.

== Cast livestream and 2025 conventions ==
External videos
- Avengers: Doomsday | Cast Announce presents the March 2025 cast announcement livestream, YouTube video from Marvel Entertainment's channel

Coinciding with the start of production on Doomsday in March 2025, Marvel used a nearly five-and-a-half-hour-long livestream to announce 26 more cast members for the film. Many of those actors returned from previous MCU media and some were reprising their roles from 20th Century Fox's X-Men film series. The livestream featured a line of director's chairs with an actor's name on each one. A new chair was revealed approximately every 12 minutes, accompanied by music from a previous Marvel project that was relevant to that actor. After revealing all 26 cast members, the livestream ended with an appearance by Downey and a rendition of composer Alan Silvestri's Avengers theme.

Due to the characters announced in the livestream, Devin Meenan of /Film thought Doomsday could be adapting elements from the 2012 comic book crossover event "Avengers vs. X-Men" written by Bendis, Matt Fraction, Jason Aaron, Ed Brubaker, and Hickman. He also felt elements of the 2010 limited series Doomwar, written by Jonathan Maberry, could be included. That comic depicts Doctor Doom invading Wakanda and features the X-Men. Austen Goslin of Polygon said the Russo brothers "might be biting off a little more than they can chew" with the large cast announced, including multiple X-Men film series actors. He was concerned that the film may "feel more like a puzzle designed to fit all these [characters] into place than like a film in its own right", and felt there may not be enough time to do justice to Doom.

The livestream saw around 100,000 concurrent viewers on YouTube, and an hour-over-hour audience growth, to become the most viewed cross-platform livestream stunt. It became the second-most trending video on YouTube with 275 million views in its first 24 hours, surpassing past livestreams for Marvel's red carpet premieres. The livestream also accumulated 3.1 million mentions across social media, which is five times higher than the "social volume" of the first trailer for the MCU film Deadpool & Wolverine (2024) which was released during Super Bowl LVIII. The livestream garnered 55 distinct trending terms on X (formerly Twitter), and the hashtag "AvengersDoomsday" was the top trending topic on the site for over seven hours. Numerous Internet memes were generated with each actor reveal. Anthony D'Alessandro of Deadline Hollywood described the stunt as a "pop cultural event". Variety's Jordan Moreau and Brent Lang said it was a "slow-burn" and likened it to the release date reveal for the seventh season of Game of Thrones in 2017, which saw a block of ice melt to reveal the date; both stunts were "mocked for their pace". Goslin described the livestream as "agonizingly slow [but] exceedingly fun". He enjoyed checking the stream for each new reveal and seeing responses on social media. James Whitbrook of Gizmodo said the livestream's viewership spoke to Marvel's "ability to maintain much of that grip it's had on pop culture over the past almost 20 years". Tom Bacon at ComicBook.com discussed the livestream in March 2026, comparing it to a slow trailer rollout for the MCU film Spider-Man: Brand New Day (2026) and noting how both approaches were intended to "maximize engagement" throughout the day. The next month, Kathryn Newton referenced the livestream when announcing that she was reprising her role as Cassie Lang for Doomsday, posting a video to social media of a similar director's chair with her name on it.

The Russo brothers and Scott Lang / Ant-Man star Paul Rudd introduced footage from the film at Disney's Destination D23 event in August 2025. Disney's Merchandise Expo in China the following month featured concept art of Doom; a light show depicting Doom and logos for the film's heroic teams; and a recreation of a panel from the "Secret Wars" comic book storyline in which Doom rips out the skeleton of Thanos, the main antagonist of the Infinity Saga. In December, Doomsday was featured at Disney's Giornate Di Cinema Sorrento presentation in Italy. The announced cast was grouped into teams: the Fantastic Four comprises Vanessa Kirby as Sue Storm / Invisible Woman, Ebon Moss-Bachrach as Ben Grimm / The Thing, Joseph Quinn as Johnny Storm / Human Torch, and Pedro Pascal as Reed Richards / Mister Fantastic; the X-Men includes Kelsey Grammer as Hank McCoy / Beast, Patrick Stewart as Charles Xavier / Professor X, Ian McKellen as Erik Lehnsherr / Magneto, Alan Cumming as Kurt Wagner / Nightcrawler, Rebecca Romijn as Raven Darkhölme / Mystique, and James Marsden as Scott Summers / Cyclops, all returning from Fox's X-Men films, and Channing Tatum as Remy LeBeau / Gambit from Deadpool & Wolverine; the New Avengers, introduced in the film Thunderbolts* (2025), features Sebastian Stan as Bucky Barnes / Winter Soldier, Wyatt Russell as John Walker / U.S. Agent, Florence Pugh as Yelena Belova / Black Widow, Lewis Pullman as Bob Reynolds / Sentry, David Harbour as Alexei Shostakov / Red Guardian, and Hannah John-Kamen as Ava Starr / Ghost; the "Heroic Avengers", led by Anthony Mackie's Sam Wilson / Captain America, which includes Chris Hemsworth as Thor, Rudd as Ant-Man, Simu Liu as Xu Shang-Chi, Danny Ramirez as Joaquin Torres / Falcon, and Tom Hiddleston as Loki; and the "Wakandan Warriors", which groups Letitia Wright as Shuri / Black Panther, Tenoch Huerta Mejía as Namor, and Winston Duke as M'Baku.

== Short teasers ==
On December 18, 2025, the Russo brothers released a short teaser of a 12-month countdown clock to mark a year until the film's scheduled release. Different short teasers were shown during each of the first four weeks of theatrical release for the Disney film Avatar: Fire and Ash, starting with its U.S. release on December 19: the first teaser revealed the return of Chris Evans as Steve Rogers and shows him holding a baby; the second features Thor praying to his father Odin for the strength to return to his adopted daughter Love after the coming battle; the third focuses on the X-Men characters Xavier, Magneto, and Cyclops, and shows a ruined Xavier's School for Gifted Youngsters; and the fourth is centered on the "Wakandan Warriors", with Shuri and M'Baku meeting Grimm. The teasers were released online on December 23, December 30, January 6, and January 13, respectively. Each teaser ends with the countdown clock. They were all noted for their similar "serious and somber" tone, and for a focus on children, continuing from the post-credits scene of the film The Fantastic Four: First Steps (2025) which focuses on Franklin Richards. Jesse Schedeen at IGN appreciated the return to a more serious tone for Thor following the more comedic approach taken under director Taika Waititi with the films Thor: Ragnarok (2017) and Thor: Love and Thunder (2022). Whitbrook said he enjoyed the first look at a Fantastic Four member interacting with other MCU characters in the fourth teaser, which includes characters that debuted in, or are closely associated with, the Fantastic Four comic books. Doom's absence from the teasers was noted by multiple commentators, and Marco Vito Oddo at ComicBook.com believed this was a smart move to build anticipation for the character. He believed Doom would be revealed in a full trailer targeted at a global audience.

All four teasers were leaked ahead of their online releases. Gizmodo's Germain Lussier expressed frustration with the leaks, feeling Marvel had fumbled the rollout. He was underwhelmed by the initial countdown teaser that was released after news of the Evans teaser already leaked, said the leaks undermined the studio's plans to get a "big, exciting, in-theater [fan] reaction" to Evans's return, and added that Marvel fans were "not used to major news being confirmed via bootlegged clips, wrapped in uncertainty of where and how to see things". The Hollywood Reporter's Borys Kit and Aaron Couch described the teaser approach as a "unique rollout" that was attempting to get "diehard" Marvel fans to see Fire and Ash multiple times in theaters. Jeremy Mathai at /Film also described the rollout as unique and said it had driven online discussion, but some of this was about how "un-hyped" some were feeling about the sombre teasers. After the X-Men teaser was released, ComicBook.com's Chris Agar said it was the best so far and there was an escalation from showing Rogers at peace, to Thor preparing for battle, to Cyclops "firing an optic blast into the sky in rage". Kyle Anderson of Nerdist also believed there was an increase in quality and excitement with each of the four teasers, and /Film's Sandy Schaefer said the Wakanda teaser was Marvel saving the best for last. Whitbrook felt the fourth teaser was "muted" compared to the previous three and their focus on "familiar heavy hitters". Schedeen believed the focus on past lead actors over new characters who had been introduced since Endgame indicated that Marvel was pivoting to reinvigorate casual fans who "checked out of the MCU once Evans and Downey did".

The four teasers collectively accumulated 1.02 billion online views within three days of the fourth being released. Couch said this was a "massive sum", especially considering they were not tied to a promotional broadcast such as the Super Bowl. Together the teasers had more views than any single Marvel trailer on Instagram (505 million) and TikTok (103 million), each teaser had on average a 188 percent higher "social volume" than most Marvel trailers, and the rollout generated 16 distinct trending terms on X. Couch said Marvel was aware the teasers would leak once they were in theaters, and the studio saw the rollout approach—which required collaboration with theaters around the world—as a continuation of the cast reveal livestream. Based on the viewership, Couch believed the leaks had not impacted fan enthusiasm and said "the experiment paid off in a big way". The Russo brothers said the teasers each gave narrative information, and described them as "stories" and "clues" rather than teasers or trailers. Despite responding negatively to the rollout and the Russos' "cryptic" comments, Lussier conceded that the approach worked since people were talking about the film 11 months before its release. There was speculation about whether Marvel was continuing the practices of using footage shot specifically for marketing, or altering footage to hide characters or details. Anderson thought the Wakanda teaser was the only one to feature actual scenes from Doomsday.

Joe Russo later said in November 2026 that they had the idea to start teasing the story of the film with the teasers a year before the film's release as a way for the directors to interact with the fans to "understand what is moving them, what is working for them". He said this was in part because of the changes in society since the release of Endgame, in which "the speed of conversation on the internet" had increased. By releasing the teasers when they did, they felt they could start getting audiences slowly invested in the story, while also gauging feedback based on "what people are tracking or not tracking" to make any necessary adjustments for clarity.

== Countdown clock livestream ==
External videos
- Avengers: Doomsday Clock presents the livestream of a live countdown to Doomsday's release date, YouTube video from Marvel Entertainment's channel

The fourth teaser debuted online through a livestream on Marvel's YouTube account that then transitioned to be a livestream of the countdown clock. This was seen as a "spiritual sequel" to, and continuing the "tradition" of, the cast reveal livestream. The countdown livestream was titled "Doomsday Clock", which MovieWeb's Richard Fink believed to be a reference to the real-world Doomsday Clock, an estimation of how close humanity is to catastrophe. Fink felt this was an indication that the subtitle Doomsday, in addition to being about Doctor Doom, was chosen because the film would feature the end of the MCU, and the clock was literally a "countdown to the end of the Marvel Universe". Zoe Miskelly at Screen Rant called it exciting, likening the countdown for the release of the film to the real-world Doomsday Clock and tying it to the "impending threat" of Doctor Doom. Lussier felt the livestream was unnecessary since the countdown was included at the end of each teaser.

Some commentators questioned whether the countdown livestream would be used to reveal additional information about the film leading up to its release. In August 2026, ahead of the public release of the full trailer, the countdown livestream was updated to feature an image of Doom and include audio clips from the trailer. In November, the countdown livestream was used to announce the cities that would be part of the film's global promotional tour, with the background of the clock changing to show outlines of each of the cities as they were announced. With the release of the final episode of the MCU series VisionQuest later in November, the countdown clock's lettering briefly shifted to red. This coincided with a VisionQuest mid-credits scene teasing the return of Wanda Maximoff / Scarlet Witch, who uses red magic. Robert Brian Taylor at Collider said there were around 40,000 viewers watching the countdown livestream in the days after the VisionQuest finale, and believed some of these were people who were anticipating a potential final trailer for the film. He felt the livestream was "kind of silly" but showed that "there is still some indescribable magic left in the MCU".

== Trailers and 2026 conventions ==
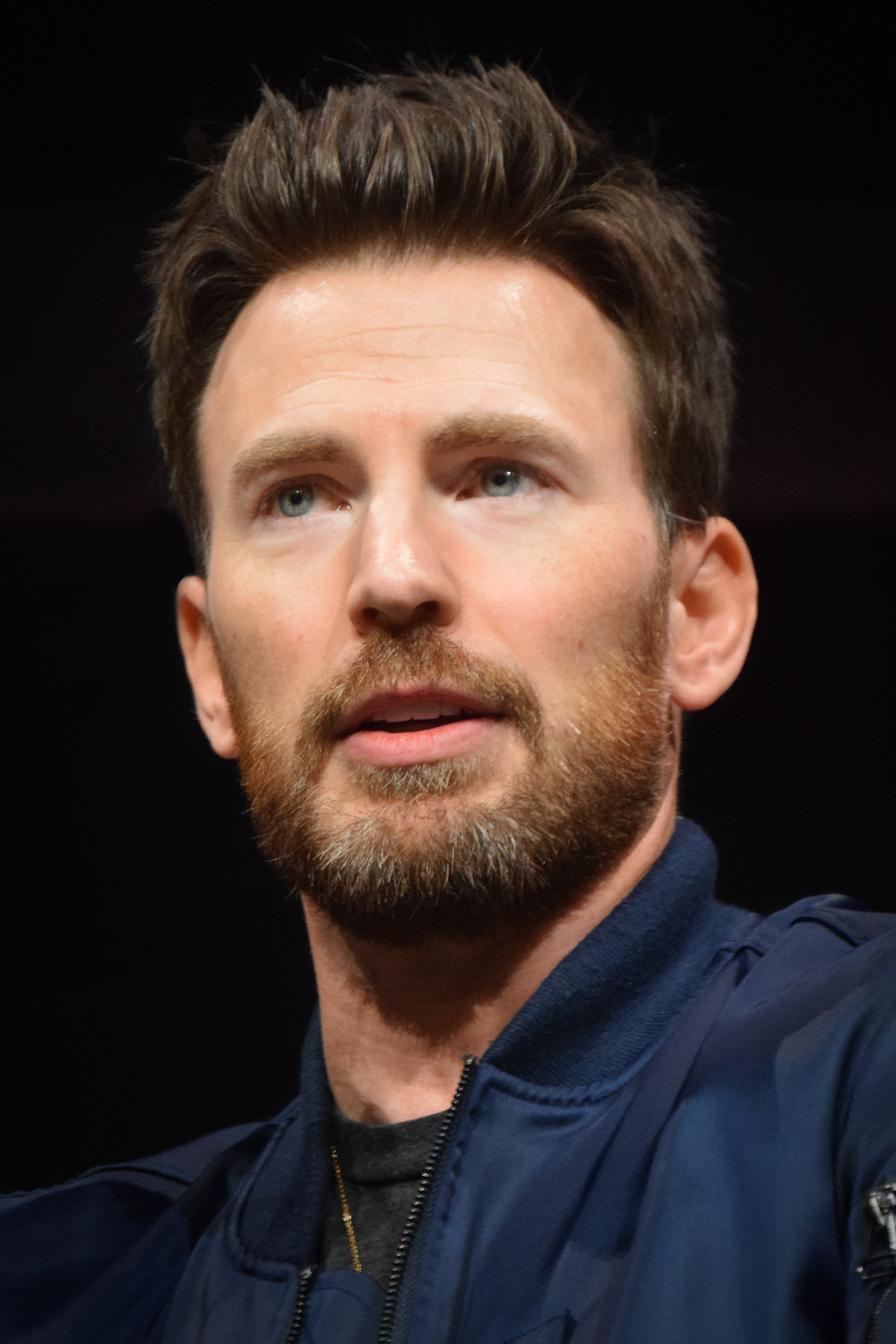
Chris Evans was one of several actors to promote the film at various conventions in 2026, after his role was revealed in a December 2025 short teaser.

Feige, Downey, Evans, and the Russos promoted the film at CinemaCon in April 2026 and showed a full trailer to attendees. It features narration from Doom, warning of an imminent multiversal threat, and Thor; Rogers wielding Mjolnir; and numerous character crossover interactions. Commentators highlighted the long-awaited reveal of Doom. Lisa Richwine for Reuters said the trailer was well received by the audience, prompting Downey to request it be played again. In a list of CinemaCon winners and losers, The Hollywood Reporter's James Hibberd listed Marvel as a winner. He also reported on the positive response from attendees, including some who said they had "never experienced a response that overwhelming" at the convention, and said the decision to show the trailer twice was "a move brimming with BDE". Footage of the film was shown at CineEurope in June 2026. The next month, Feige promoted the film at the Bilibili World Expo in Shanghai, showing concept art and a video message from Downey, Evans, and Hemsworth.

Beginning in August 2025, Fantastic Four social media accounts shared a First Steps clip every Sunday in which Reed and Sue discuss having a weekly family dinner. On July 19, 2026, the accounts shared a new version of the clip which glitches to a black screen and includes new dialogue from the pair. This was believed to be teasing the Doomsday trailer, which was released online the following day. This was the same trailer that was shown at CinemaCon, and its public release coincided with tickets going on sale for premium large format (PLF) screenings. Rafael Motamayor of /Film and Zoe Miskelly of Screen Rant both compared the trailer's conflict between the X-Men and other heroes to the "Avengers vs. X-Men" comic book event. In his list of winners and losers for the week, Hibberd called the trailer a "loser" and said online responses found it to be a "muddled step down" from previous Avengers trailers. There were criticisms that some scenes looked like the actors were not together for filming. Hibberd believed the larger problem was that Doomsday felt like a "character dump that's happening only because the studio desperately needs this to happen", rather than the culmination of a well constructed storyline. The trailer garnered 503 million views in its first 24 hours, becoming the second most-viewed trailer in history behind Spider-Man: Brand New Day's 719 million views. It also became Disney's most-viewed trailer, surpassing the 365 million views of Deadpool & Wolverine's Super Bowl teaser.

Also in July 2026, Doomsday was promoted at SDCC. The San Diego Gaslamp Quarter archway was decorated to promote the film, incurring a $160,000 fine from San Diego officials who routinely issue large fines for outdoor marketing during SDCC. A booth at the convention displayed costumes and the head of a Sentinel. One of the costumes was for a Latverian witch, which was changed to a different color each day of the convention. Commentators questioned whether these costumes were connected to the Infinity Stones, since there is an Infinity Stone matching each of the colors used. They also theorized that the costumes could belong to an existing MCU witch or magic user, such as Wanda Maximoff / Scarlet Witch. At Marvel Studios' panel, much of the cast was present including Downey, Evans, Pascal, and Hayley Atwell (Peggy Carter). Footage was shown, and panel attendees received a Doom mask and cape. Kit and Couch said the panel's footage was what many fans felt "the initial trailer should have been: something that clearly delineated the stakes and the threat", while the panel overall "demolished any negativity from days prior". Also during the panel, Ryan Reynolds appeared in the audience dressed as a version of his X-Men film series and Deadpool & Wolverine character Wade Wilson / Deadpool, asking for a role in the film. This was seen by some as confirmation that Reynolds would be in Doomsday, following conflicting reports and speculation about his involvement.

The SDCC footage was also shown at Disney's D23 convention in August 2026, before being released online as a "special look". Feige, Downey, Evans, and Atwell promoted the film in a panel at the convention, which was interrupted by a video message featuring Hugh Jackman—who portrayed Logan / Wolverine in the X-Men films and Deadpool & Wolverine—and an off-screen Reynolds. In the video, Reynolds seemingly forces Jackman to ask for roles in the film for both of them, which was again seen by some as confirmation, or at least a strong indication, that Reynolds and Jackman would be appearing in Doomsday. D'Alessandro reiterated that there was some negativity from fans regarding the trailer that was released ahead of SDCC, and he thought this was to be expected due to the secrecy surrounding the film. He said the special look was more enticing to audiences. William Hughes at The A.V. Club said the special look was the best showcase for Doom so far, highlighting Sue's narration about his backstory and the "genuine[ly] jaw-dropping image" of him controlling Sentinels.

At the end of August 2026, a recreation of the first trailer in Lego form was released as part of Disney's "All Moments Lead to Doomsday" campaign. Unlike previous examples of Lego trailer recreations, this was an official release from Disney Consumer Products, Marvel Studios, and Lego. Lussier said it had "a level of quality most Lego recreations could never achieve" and commented on the difference between the dark visuals of the real trailer and the bright lighting used for the Lego version, which he thought could have been done to make sure the different Lego characters were visible. Lussier questioned whether the dark visuals in the real trailer were being used to hide visual effects or if there were storytelling reasons for the approach. Liz Declan of ComicBook.com also noted the brightness difference with the Lego version. Willa Rowe, writing for Polygon, said the recreation was a fun way to experience the trailer again and said it was "equally charming and impressive to see how faithful the recreation is, down to the characters' facial expressions".

Mackie, Harbour, and Duke attended SDCC Málaga in October 2026 to promote the film. A new promotional poster featuring Doom and the Latverian Witches was released, with Michael Cripe of IGN saying the Latverian Witches were the highlight. A Major League Baseball (MLB)–themed sneak peek aired during Game 1 of the 2026 World Series on October 23. Largely set on the Fantastic Four's Earth-828 at Ebbets Field in a game between the Brooklyn Dodgers and the New York Giants where Reed throws a ceremonial first pitch to Johnny, the clip also shows Thor being uneasy with Rogers being able to wield Mjolnir and Lang unsure of how to refer to Rogers, mistakenly calling him "Captain America" with Wilson present. MLB players Freddie Freeman, Jacob Misiorowski, Bryce Harper, Randy Arozarena, and Junior Caminero appear in the footage. The following day, Marvel released a television spot for the film, using much of the same footage from the World Series spot while expanding on the footage of Thor being uneasy with Rogers and Lang being unsure of how to refer to Rogers. A sneak peak of the film will be shown on November 30, 2026, during the airing of The Wonderful World of Disney: Holiday Spectacular on ABC.

== Additional promotion ==
After Doomsday and the film Dune: Part Three were both scheduled for release on December 18, 2026, some fans online began using the term "Dunesday", inspired by the "Barbenheimer" phenomenon related to the dual release of the films Barbie and Oppenheimer on July 21, 2023. Several other attempts to recreate Barbenheimer for same-day releases had been made, and it was unclear if "Dunesday" would catch on or have the same impact. Downey and Dune star Timothée Chalamet endorsed the term, which was used by several outlets discussing the two films' box office potential. At CinemaCon in April 2026, Disney announced that Doomsday would receive the company's Infinity Vision certification for PLFs, which is intended to inform audiences which theaters offer "the biggest, brightest, and most immersive cinematic experiences" and meet certain technical standards. Many commentators felt Infinity Vision was created in response to Doomsday not being able to open in IMAX theaters in the U.S. due to Dune: Part Three having exclusive rights to those for at least three weeks. In his list of CinemaCon winners and losers, Hibberd described the Infinity Vision announcement as "marketing bullshit" and predicted that the label would not be mentioned again after Doomsday's release. In June 2026, a Flying Horse Coffee location in London near South by Southwest London was rebranded as "Dom Latveria Coffee" for a pop-up event with Doom-themed coffee items and the Russo brothers visiting to meet fans and sign bags of coffee. This stunt, which was teased by the Russos leading up to their meet-and-greet, was met with disappointment from some fans who believed the directors had been teasing the public release of the film's full trailer.

Several mid-credits and post-credits scenes of MCU films and series directly relate to Doomsday: the post-credits scene of Thunderbolts* shows the Fantastic Four arriving to Earth-616; the post-credits scene of First Steps shows Doom interacting with Franklin Richards; and a mid-credits scene of VisionQuest's finale episode shows Doom saving Wanda Maximoff from her collapsing of Mount Wundagore, intending to claim her power. Additionally, Endgame was re-released in theaters on September 25, 2026, under the title Avengers Endgame: Encore, in anticipation of Doomsday's release, with two minutes of additional footage; Infinity Vision and IMAX releases featured an additional three-to-four minutes for a total of five-to-six minutes of additional footage. Joe Russo said the re-release was "critically important", believing it was "required viewing" to follow the story of Doomsday. The new footage acts as a narrative bridge between the two films, showing a natural progression from Endgame to Doomsday. A "silence your cellphones" ad featuring many of the Doomsday cast in costume debuted with Encore. The Russos shot the Thunderbolts* and First Steps scenes and the additional Encore footage during the production of Doomsday. Jeremy Fuster from TheWrap noted that Marvel had increased the frequency of end credits scenes to set up the film compared to past MCU projects.

In October 2024, Marvel Comics announced a new publishing line titled Marvel Premier Collection, which consists of new paperback editions of popular comic book runs that are considered to be good starting points for new readers. Avengers: Time Runs Out, collecting material from Avengers vol. 5 #35–44 and New Avengers vol. 3 #24–33 by Hickman, Stefano Caselli, and Mike Deodato Jr., and Avengers: Secret Wars, collecting Secret Wars (2015) #1–9 and the Free Comic Book Day 2015 (Secret Wars) #0 by Hickman and Esad Ribić, were released in August 2026 with new introductions by Hickman and respective forewords by the Russo brothers and Feige. The Countdown to Avengers: Doomsday official podcast, hosted by Iman Vellani—who stars as Kamala Khan / Ms. Marvel in the MCU—and podcaster Frank Alvarez, premiered on August 27. The five-episode weekly podcast recaps key MCU moments leading up to Doomsday, respectively covering the films The Avengers (2012), Avengers: Age of Ultron (2015), Captain America: Civil War (2016), Infinity War, and Endgame, with the final episode coinciding with the Encore release. The podcast returned with Vellani and Alvarez for another six weekly episodes beginning November 5, respectively covering the original Fox X-Men film trilogy, Deadpool & Wolverine, Shang-Chi and the Legend of the Ten Rings (2021), Black Panther: Wakanda Forever (2022), Thunderbolts*, and The Fantastic Four: First Steps. On October 31, a 15-minute drone show occurred at Hangang Park in Seoul, South Korea, featuring various characters and moments from the MCU and culminating in Doom.

Las Vegas, São Paulo, the Gold Coast in Queensland, Rome, London, Seoul, Shanghai, Toronto, and Los Angeles were part of the film's global promotional tour. In Las Vegas, Doomsday was promoted by Evans, Mackie, and Liu at the 2026 Las Vegas Grand Prix, which occurred through Disney and Formula One's "Fuel the Magic" partnership, and featured a branded Formula One show car. Additional promoted throughout Las Vegas included taking over the Sphere venue and a branded Archer Aviation air taxi. Christopher Lawrence from the Las Vegas Review-Journal called the promotional effort "underwhelming".

== Merchandise and partnerships ==
At SDCC 2026, Hot Toys debuted their figurines for the film, while Hasbro revealed their Marvel Legends action figures. Lego sets, Nerf products, Funko Pops, and Hot Wheels were also available, as were different clothing and accessory products, including from the brands Heroes & Villains and Loungefly. Exclusive merchandise was available at Disneyland. In October, Google Search debuted an Easter egg tied to searching "Avengers: Doomsday". Doom's mask would appear and when clicked, the search results were "warp[ed]" to bring up logos for the Avengers, Fantastic Four, Black Panther, and the X-Men, each of which presented a five-question quiz in Google's AI Mode. Completing each of the quizzes ended with the Doomsday countdown clock to the film's release. At the end of the month, format-specific posters were released as well as popcorn buckets, drink vessels, and other collectibles that would be available at theater chains.

Beginning in November 2026, Disney and Marvel launched a number of partnerships for the film, including: a themed "Dipping Box" at Jack in the Box, which featured themed dipping sauces, as well as eight connecting, collectible magnets featuring characters from the film; Burger King in India featured themed food items, including a Doom-themed Whopper with a black bun and green patty, which was announced with a parody of the director's chair cast reveal; Doom-themed menu items at KFC as well as five Doomsday-themed Colonel Sanders Cosplay Collection figurines, announced with a commercial that shows all the restaurants in a city have been destroyed by Doom except for a KFC location because they had "come to an agreement" with him; and drinks inspired by Marvel characters and themed donuts at Dunkin' Donuts, along with a Doom Munchkins tin and drinkware with characters from the film. Additionally, Tatum appeared as Gambit along with H.E.R.B.I.E. in a commercial promoting the Dunkin' partnership, while four Dunkin' locations in Los Angeles, Chicago, New York, and Boston were transformed into themed shops around the Fantastic Four, X-Men, Avengers, and Doom, respectively. Other brand partners included themed packaging with Pop Secret popcorn, M&M's candy, Oreo cookies, and the Downey co-founded brand Happy coffee; and Dave & Buster's rebranding as "Doom & Buster's" from mid-November through late January 2027, featuring Marvel-themed games, areas, merchandise, and drinks. Jeep released a commercial promoting their 4x4 vehicles that saw the vehicles driving through the terrain of different MCU locations including New Avengers Tower in New York City, the X-Mansion in Westchester County, New York in Earth-828, Wakanda, and Latveria, with the characters Captain America, H.E.R.B.I.E., Human Torch, Nightcrawler, the Thing, Thor, and Sentinels featured. The commercial was noted for its first official looks at Nightcrawler and Latveria. Cripe questioned if the use of the MCU's magic portals at the end of the commercial confirmed that Dr. Stephen Strange would be in the film. Smirnoff partnered with Doomsday prop master Barry Gibbs to create a limited edition chalice designed to resemble the film's production and set design, and also created a branded Crosley Radio record player. Deadpool & Wolverine actor Karan Soni appeared in a Smirnoff commercial to promote their Doomsday-inspired cocktails. Additionally, a Smirnoff event in Grand Rapids, Michigan was planned because the city is part of area code 616. Visa released a commercial showing Thor, Gambit, Beast, and the Thing using Visa for every day tasks, shown through a first-person point of view.

In December 2026, TikTok creator content will begin appearing on Disney+ that is "strategically aligned" to promote the release of Doomsday. WWE will produce a special edition of their Worlds Collide live event themed around the film, titled "Worlds Collide: Doomsday", on December 15, 2026. The event will feature wrestlers from WWE's Raw, SmackDown, and NXT divisions, as well as their subsidiary promotion Lucha Libre AAA Worldwide (AAA), with Doomsday WWE products being made available for purchase.

== See also ==
- Production of Avengers: Doomsday and Avengers: Secret Wars
