= Professor X in other media =

Appearances of Professor X in cinema, television and video games

Adaptations of Professor X in other media
- Original source: Comics published by Marvel Comics
- First appearance: X-Men #1 (September 1963)

Films and television
- Film(s): X-Men (2000); X2 (2003); X-Men: The Last Stand (2006); X-Men Origins: Wolverine (2009); X-Men: First Class (2011); The Wolverine (2013); X-Men: Days of Future Past (2014); X-Men: Apocalypse (2016); Logan (2017); Deadpool 2 (2018); Dark Phoenix (2019); Doctor Strange in the Multiverse of Madness (2022); Avengers: Doomsday (2026)
- Television show(s): X-Men (1992); X-Men: Evolution (2000); Wolverine and the X-Men (2009); Marvel Anime: X-Men (2011); Legion (2017); X-Men '97 (2024)

Games
- Video game(s): The Uncanny X-Men (1989); X-Men (1992); X-Men Legends (2004)

This is a list of all non-comics media appearances of the Marvel Comics character Professor X.

== Television ==
Left to right, Professor X as depicted in X-Men: The Animated Series, X-Men: Evolution, and Wolverine and the X-Men.

- Professor X appears in the "Sub-Mariner" segment of The Marvel Super Heroes, voiced by Chris Wiggins. This version is the leader of the Allies for Peace.
- Professor X appears in Spider-Man and His Amazing Friends, voiced by Stan Jones.
- Professor X appears in X-Men: Pryde of the X-Men, voiced by John Stephenson.
- Professor X appears in X-Men: The Animated Series, voiced by Cedric Smith as an adult and Stuart Stone as a child. In a time travel story, its revealed that without Xavier, the 1990s would in a world war between humans and mutants.
- Professor X appears in Spider-Man: The Animated Series, voiced again by Cedric Smith. Spider-Man sought his help during the Neogenic Nightmare Saga, where he was in danger of mutating into Man-Spider. However, Xavier misunderstood Spider-Man's worries.
- Professor X appears in X-Men: Evolution, voiced by David Kaye. Near the end, Apocalypse briefly turns him into one of his Four Horsemen. Though the link between them gave Xavier years of foreknowledge about the dangers mutants will face.
- Professor X appears in the Robot Chicken episode "Sausage Fest", voiced by Seth Green.
- Professor X makes a cameo appearance in the Iron Man: Armored Adventures episode "The X-Factor", voiced by Ron Halder. Here Xavier takes Jean Grey into his protection, after Iron Man saved her from being kidnapped by Magneto.
- Professor X appears in Wolverine and the X-Men, voiced by Jim Ward. Due to an explosion of the Phoenix Force Xavier ends up in a irreversible coma that lasts 20 years. He uses his body in the past as a medium to talk to Logan, whom he directs into preventing Master Mold and the Sentinels from taking over the world. Unfortunately the success only leads to a future where Apocalypse rules instead.
- Professor X appears in The Super Hero Squad Show episode "Mysterious Mayhem at Mutant High!", voiced again by Jim Ward.
- Professor X appears in Marvel Anime: X-Men, voiced by Katsunosuke Hori in the Japanese version and by Cam Clarke in the English dub.
- Professor X appears in Marvel Disk Wars: The Avengers, voiced by Osamu Saka in Japanese and again by Cam Clarke in English.
- Professor X appears in the third season of Legion, portrayed by Harry Lloyd. Prior to Lloyd's casting, series star Dan Stevens stated in an interview on The Late Late Show with James Corden that he offered Patrick Stewart the chance to reprise the role of Professor X from the X-Men film series. While Stewart declined, he said that he was "absolutely 100%" willing to do so under such circumstances.
- Professor X appears in X-Men '97, voiced by Ross Marquand.

== Film ==
Professor Xavier's younger self (portrayed by James McAvoy) (left) and older self (Patrick Stewart) (right) in X-Men: Days of Future Past.

- Two incarnations of Charles Xavier appear in 20th Century Fox's X-Men film series, portrayed by Patrick Stewart and James McAvoy. The first incarnation by Stewart appears in X-Men (2000), X2, X-Men: The Last Stand, X-Men Origins: Wolverine, The Wolverine, X-Men: Days of Future Past, and Logan while the second incarnation by McAvoy appears in X-Men: First Class, X-Men: Days of Future Past, X-Men: Apocalypse, Deadpool 2, and Dark Phoenix.
- An alternate reality variant of Professor X appears in the Marvel Cinematic Universe (MCU) film Doctor Strange in the Multiverse of Madness, portrayed again by Patrick Stewart. This version is a member of the Illuminati from Earth-838.
- Professor X will appear in the Marvel Cinematic Universe (MCU) film Avengers: Doomsday (2026), portrayed again by Patrick Stewart.
- The native MCU incarnation of Professor X will appear in the X-Men (2028) film, and will be portrayed by Christoper Abott.

== Video games ==
- Professor X appears as a non-playable character (NPC) in X-Men: Mutant Academy.
- Professor X appears as an unlockable playable character in X-Men: Mutant Academy 2.
- Professor X appears as an NPC in Spider-Man 2: Enter Electro, voiced by Daran Norris.
- Professor X appears in X-Men: Next Dimension, voiced by Patrick Stewart.
- Professor X appears in X2: Wolverine's Revenge, voiced again by Patrick Stewart.
- Professor X appears as an unlockable playable character in X-Men Legends, voiced again by Patrick Stewart.
- Professor X appears as an unlockable playable character in X-Men Legends II: Rise of Apocalypse, voiced again by Patrick Stewart.
- Professor X appears in X-Men: The Official Game, voiced again by Patrick Stewart.
- Professor X appears as an NPC in Marvel: Ultimate Alliance, voiced by Tom Kane. Depending on the player's choices, Mystique may kill Professor X, leading to the X-Men's disbandment.
- Professor X appears as an assist character in Spider-Man: Web of Shadows.
- Professor X appears as an NPC in Marvel Avengers Alliance.
- Professor X appears as a playable character in Lego Marvel Super Heroes, voiced by James Arnold Taylor.
- Professor X appears in Marvel Heroes, voiced again by Jim Ward.
- Professor X appears in Marvel Ultimate Alliance 3: The Black Order as an NPC in the "Rise of the Phoenix" DLC, voiced by Keith Ferguson..
- Professor X appears as an unlockable playable character in Marvel: Future Fight.
- Professor X appears in Marvel Snap.
- Professor X appears as a playable character in Marvel Super War.
- Professor X appears in Marvel Cosmic Invasion, voiced by Kerry Shale.
- Professor X appears as an NPC in Marvel Tokon: Fighting Souls, voiced by Nolan North.

== Miscellaneous ==
- Professor X appears in the novel X-Men: Shadows of the Past, written by Michael Jan Friedman.
- Professor X appears in Planet X, written by Michael Jan Friedman. Archangel and Beverly Crusher program a copy of Professor X into the Enterprise-E's holodeck to assist them in finding a cure for the "transformed", a group of artificial mutants from a planet that the Enterprise was visiting.
- Professor X appears in the novel X-Men: The Chaos Engine Trilogy, written by Steven A. Roman. This version is the leader of an X-Men detachment who were inside the Starlight Citadel when Doctor Doom, Magneto, and the Red Skull separately obtained a flawed Cosmic Cube and rewrote reality to their liking. Due to the citadel protecting them from Doom's changes, Professor X leads the X-Men in their efforts to restore their original reality. Though he convinces Magneto to give up his world, the Red Skull steals the Cosmic Cube and creates his own reality, in which Professor X is one of his loyal followers. Nonetheless, the X-Men restore his mind and defeat the Red Skull.
- Professor X appears in the Astonishing X-Men motion comic, voiced by Dan Green.
- Professor X appears in Marvel's Wastelanders, voiced by Clarke Peters.

== See also ==
- X-Men in other media
