= Infamous Iron Man =

Marvel Comics limited series

- Artwork for the cover of Infamous Iron Man vol. 1, 1 (October, 2016 Marvel Comics); Art by Alex Maleev

Publication information
- Publisher: Marvel Comics
- Schedule: Monthly
- Format: Ongoing series
- Genre: Superhero
- Publication date: October 2016 – September 2017
- No. of issues: 12
- Main character: Victor Von Doom

Creative team
- Created by: Brian Michael Bendis; Alex Maleev
- Written by: Brian Michael Bendis
- Artist: Alex Maleev

Infamous Iron Man is an American comic book series featuring the Marvel Comics character Victor Von Doom. Written by comic veteran Brian Michael Bendis, and drawn by Alex Maleev, the series began publication in October 2016. Infamous Iron Man follows Von Doom as he takes on the persona of Iron Man after "Civil War II".

== Publication history ==
The series was created by writer Brian Michael Bendis and artist Alex Maleev. The first issue was released on October 19, 2016, and had reasonable success, as it sold 73,735 in its first month and was the 23rd most popular title that month. It was well received by critics and fans, with an aggregate score of 7.6 and 8.0 respectively on Comicbook Roundup. At the end of the series, the story of Dr. Doom as Iron Man continued in The Unbelievable GwenPool #21 and Invincible Iron Man #593.

== Plot ==
After the events of the Civil War II storyline, Victor Von Doom rescues S.H.I.E.L.D. Director Maria Hill from Diablo and visits Tony Stark's lab, where he reveals to the Tony Stark A.I. that he'll assume the mantle of Iron Man. He then appears in La Paz, Bolivia, where he attempts to offer the Mad Thinker a chance at redemption. When the Mad Thinker refuses, Victor defeats him and destroys his lab. He then goes to visit a friend, Doctor Amara Perera, at her apartment only to be attacked by the Thing, who was sent by S.H.I.E.L.D. to capture him. After a brief battle, Victor transports himself and Amara to Switzerland where he reveals to her the reason for his change of heart and search for redemption. Thing goes to Castle Doom in Latveria only to be confronted by Cynthia Von Doom, Victor's mother. While talking to Maria Hill, Victor discovers that the Thing is in Latveria. Arriving at his destroyed castle, Victor finds the Thing being affected by a spell and salutes his mother. During a confrontation, Cynthia reveals her reasons for showing up and releases the Thing from her spell, after Doom asks her to.

Victor then battles the Wizard, who manages to outsmart him. During the battle, Victor becomes distracted by a vision of the future only to be confronted by Sharon Carter, who attempted to arrest him, and escapes. The Wizard then meets up with a large group of super criminals, including the Hood and Jigsaw, who have congregated in the same hideout to discuss what to do about Doom. The villains are terrified, reasoning Doom was bad enough as an ally, but as a hero they would be finished. The new alliance agrees they have to kill Doom, and are encouraged by the fact there are too many of them for Doom to handle at once. Doom then crashes through the ceiling and easily dispatches the lot of them, leaving the Wrecker to serve as a witness for S.H.I.E.L.D.

The Thing then returns to his apartment to find Doom eating at a small table he set for himself. Doom apologizes for the intrusion and for the fact he's eating, explaining his recent duties sometimes cause him to forget to eat. He apologizes for their earlier altercations and even confesses he admires Ben Grimm and Reed Richards when they were at school together. Doom again tries to convince Grimm that he's changed, then leaves. The Thing is later shocked when he sees Reed Richards in front of him. After a confusing conversation, Reed tells him that Victor Von Doom can't be trusted and that Thing must kill him. Meanwhile, Victor encounters Ironheart in his destroyed castle and has a vision of the future where he meets an elderly Tony Stark, who has become the Sorcerer Supreme. The Thing then tells the Human Torch about his encounter with Victor until he gets a call that Ironheart has captured Victor and brought him to the S.H.I.E.L.D. Helicarrier. While in custody, some of the agents attempt to kill him out of revenge, only for his mother to rescue him. Victor wakes up in an alternate dimension and has an argument with his mother, who won't tell him of her true intentions and plans, until Reed appears, alarming Victor.

It is later revealed that Victor returned to Earth and turned himself over to S.H.I.E.L.D. While in custody, Victor is visited by Doctor Strange who tries to help him solve the mystery of his mother and Reed Richards. During that time, Reed Richards suddenly appears, attempting to enter the base, only to be confronted by Sharon Carter, Thing and several agents. Victor and Strange exit the cell and discover that Reed is actually Mephisto in disguise. In the middle of the fight, Mephisto, breaking the fourth wall, reveals that Cynthia and Reed's appearances have been orchestrated by him in an attempt to defeat Victor, his motivation being to keep Victor from redeeming himself and avoiding the fate Mephisto had planned for him. Doom and Doctor Strange manage to defeat Mephisto. After that, Doom takes his leave and is later seen invading a secret Hydra base on an island, after teleporting the Thing to a fancy hotel in Amsterdam. Meanwhile, Amara is seen at a hospital, when the doctor tells her that she's pregnant.

== Collected editions ==
Title	Material collected	Publication date	ISBN
Infamous Iron Man Vol. 1: Infamous	Infamous Iron Man #1–6	June 2017	978-1302906245
Infamous Iron Man Vol. 2: The Absolution of Doom	Infamous Iron Man #7–12	December 2017	978-1302906252
Infamous Iron Man by Bendis & Maleev	Infamous Iron Man #1–12, Invincible Iron Man #593–600	August 2023	978-1302952600
