= X-Men in other media =

Adaptations of the X-Men in other media
- Original source: Comics published by Marvel Comics
- First appearance: The X-Men #1 (September 1963)

Print publications
- Novel(s): X-Men: Dark Mirror; X-Men Mutant Empire Saga
- Reference book(s): Science of the X-Men

Films and television
- Film(s): Generation X (1996); X-Men (2000); X2 (2003); X-Men: The Last Stand (2006); X-Men Origins: Wolverine (2009); X-Men: First Class (2011); The Wolverine (2013); X-Men: Days of Future Past (2014); Deadpool (2016); X-Men: Apocalypse (2016); Logan (2017); Deadpool 2 (2018); Dark Phoenix (2019); The New Mutants (2020); Deadpool & Wolverine (2024); Avengers: Doomsday (2026)
- Television show(s): X-Men: Pryde of the X-Men (1989); X-Men: The Animated Series (1992–1997); X-Men: Evolution (2000–2003); Wolverine and the X-Men (2009); Marvel Anime: Wolverine (2011); Marvel Anime: X-Men (2011); Legion (2017–2019); The Gifted (2017–2019); X-Men '97 (2024–present)

The X-Men are a superhero team created by Marvel Comics that appear in comic books and other forms of media. It is one of the highest-grossing media franchises.

== Television ==
=== Animation ===
==== 1960s ====
The X-Men made their first animated appearance on The Marvel Super Heroes TV series in 1966 with Professor X commanding the original X-Men line-up of Cyclops, Beast, Marvel Girl, Angel, and Iceman. In this episode, the X-Men are not referred to as the X-Men, but rather as the Allies for Peace.

==== 1980s ====
- The X-Men guest-starred in several episodes of Spider-Man and His Amazing Friends, starting with a flashback in "The Origin of Iceman". X-Men member Sunfire appeared in a later episode teaming up with the Amazing Friends. The X-Men's next appearance was in "A Firestar is Born", which included appearances from Professor X, Storm, Angel, Cyclops, Wolverine and Juggernaut. The X-Men returned the following season in "The X-Men Adventure", with appearances from Professor X, Cyclops, Kitty Pryde (as Sprite), Storm, Nightcrawler, Colossus and Thunderbird.
- In 1989, Marvel Productions produced a half-hour X-Men pilot episode titled X-Men: Pryde of the X-Men. It related the story of Kitty Pryde's first adventure with Professor X, Cyclops, Storm, Wolverine, Colossus, Nightcrawler, and Dazzler as they fought against Magneto, the White Queen, Juggernaut, the Blob, Pyro and Toad. The series was never picked up, but the single episode aired infrequently in syndication during the Marvel Action Universe series and was released on video in 1990.

==== 1990s ====
- In 1992, Fox, 20th Century Fox Television, and Fox Kids launched an X-Men animated series with the roster of Cyclops, Wolverine, Rogue, Storm, Beast, Gambit, Jubilee, Jean Grey and Professor X with Morph making occasional appearances. The two-part pilot episode, "Night of the Sentinels", began a five-season series, ending in 1997.
- The X-Men guest-starred on Spider-Man: The Animated Series in episodes "The Mutant Agenda" and "Mutants Revenge", when Spider-Man seeks Professor X's help. Storm would later guest-star in the Secret Wars arc.
- In 1995, Cyclops, Jean Grey, Gambit, Wolverine, Storm, and Juggernaut, along with the Scarlet Spider, made cameos in the Fantastic Four series, in "Nightmare in Green".

==== 2000s ====
- In 2000, The WB Network launched X-Men: Evolution, which portrayed many of the X-Men as teenagers attending a regular public high school while training to control their powers at the Xavier's School for Gifted Youngsters. The series ended in 2003 after its fourth season. The main cast of young X-Men comprised Cyclops, Jean Grey, Spyke, Rogue, Kitty Pryde (as Shadowcat), and Nightcrawler. Their adult mutant mentors included Professor X, Storm, Wolverine, and Beast. The series also featured the New Mutants starting in the second season, consisting of Boom Boom, Sunspot, Iceman, Wolfsbane, Magma, Multiple, Jubilee, Berzerker, and Cannonball. Angel also makes appearances. Colossus, X-23 and Gambit appear as villains in this incarnation. The series was released by Warner Bros. Television Studios instead of releasing by 20th Century Fox Television.
- In 2003, the X-Men and mutant-kind were mentioned in an episode of the short-lived CGI series Spider-Man: The New Animated Series, "The Party". Peter Parker is quoted as saying, "I bet the X-Men get to go to parties." Soon after, he is ambushed by a group of police officers, one of them calling him a "mutant freak".
- Wolverine and the X-Men debuted in the United States on January 23, 2009. It featured Wolverine, Emma Frost, Cyclops, Beast, Storm, Kitty Pryde (as Shadowcat), Iceman, Rogue, Nightcrawler, Angel/Archangel, Jean Grey and Professor X. The show was cancelled after one season.
- The X-Men appeared on Cartoon Network's The Super Hero Squad Show. Unlike their comic book counterparts, mutants are not discriminated against in Super Hero City, resulting in Professor X opening "Mutant High", where his students are peacefully tutored by the Professor while helping out other heroes to defend the city from the villains of Villainville led by Doctor Doom. The X-Men are featured heavily in the episode "Mysterious Mayhem at Mutant High!". Wolverine and later Scarlet Witch both appear as main members of the titular Super Hero Squad, while the series also includes appearances from Cyclops, Iceman, Jean Grey, Kitty Pryde, Lockheed, Colossus, Storm, Professor X, X-23, and Firestar.

==== 2010s ====
As part of a four-series collaboration between the Japanese Madhouse animation house and Marvel, the X-Men and Wolverine both starred in two separate 12 episode anime series that premiered in Japan on Animax and in the United States on G4 in 2011. The X-Men series deals with the X-Men coming to Japan to investigate the disappearance of Armor. The antagonists are the U-Men. It featured Cyclops, Wolverine, Storm, Beast, Emma Frost, Armor and Charles Xavier, as well as frequent flashbacks with Jean Grey. Other X-Men like Colossus and Rogue made cameo appearances in the finale.

==== 2020s ====
On November 12, 2021, Marvel announced a revival of the 1992–1997 animated series titled X-Men '97 produced by Marvel Studios and was released in 2024 on Disney+. Several cast members from the original animated series reprised their roles along with new cast members. Beau DeMayo was the head writer for the first two seasons and executive producer for the series with director Larry Houston, and showrunners and producers Eric and Julia Lewald from the original series acting as consultants. DeMayo was fired as head writer in March 2024 and Matthew Chauncey was hired to replace him that July. X-Men '97 premiered in 2024.

=== Live-action ===
- In 1996, the TV movie Generation X aired on Fox Network. Initially a television pilot, it was later broadcast as a television film. It is based on the Marvel comic book series Generation X. The film featured Banshee and Emma Frost as the headmasters of Xavier's School for Gifted Youngsters and M, Skin, Mondo, Jubilee. The team battled a mad scientist who used a machine to develop psychic powers.
- In October 2015, 20th Century Fox Television announced that FX had ordered a pilot titled Legion. The series tells the story of David Haller, who is diagnosed as schizophrenic, but following a strange encounter is confronted with the possibility that the voices he hears and the visions he sees might be real. The first season premiered in February 2017. It ended with the third season.
- The Gifted is a 20th Century Fox Television series that focuses on two parents who discover their children possess mutant powers. Forced to go on the run from a hostile government, the family joins up with an underground network of mutants and must fight to survive. While the X-Men have been disbanded in the series, the underground network of mutants features comic regulars Blink, Polaris, Thunderbird and the Stepford Cuckoos. Fox ended the series after 2 seasons.
- In WandaVision (2021), Evan Peters appeared as a character named Ralph Bohner who poses as Wanda Maximoff's deceased twin brother Pietro, a reference to his role in the X-Men series as Peter Maximoff.

== Motion comics ==
Marvel produced motion comics based on Astonishing X-Men, releasing them on Hulu, iTunes, the PlayStation Store and other video services. These animated episodes were released on DVD through Shout! Factory. It has been announced that Marvel Knights Animation will continue animating Joss Whedon and John Cassaday's run. Starting with the second storyline of the series Astonishing X-Men: Dangerous.

The titles in the series include:

- Astonishing X-Men: Gifted (2009)
- Astonishing X-Men: Dangerous (April 2012)
- Astonishing X-Men: Torn (August 2012)
- Astonishing X-Men: Unstoppable (November 2012)

== Film ==
=== X-Men: Darktide ===
- In 2006, Minimates released a short animated brickfilm, X-Men: Darktide on DVD with a box set of figures. The story involved the X-Men battling the Brotherhood at an oil rig. The team consists of Cyclops, Jean Grey, Archangel, Wolverine, Beast, Xavier and Storm. The Brotherhood team is Mystique, Magneto and Juggernaut.

=== Film franchise ===
From 2000 to 2020, 20th Century Studios (known as 20th Century Fox at the time) released thirteen superhero films as part of the X-Men film series.

The first three films focus on the conflict between Professor Xavier and Magneto, who have opposing views on humanity's relationship with mutants. While Xavier believes humanity and mutants can coexist, Magneto believes a war is coming, which he intends to fight and win. The Bryan Singer-directed X-Men was released on July 14, 2000, with the team roster of Professor X (Patrick Stewart), Cyclops (James Marsden), Wolverine (Hugh Jackman), Storm (Halle Berry) and Jean Grey (Famke Janssen). Singer returned for the sequel X2 released on May 2, 2003, with Rogue (Anna Paquin), Iceman (Shawn Ashmore), and Nightcrawler (Alan Cumming) joining the team. Singer was replaced by Brett Ratner for X-Men: The Last Stand, released on May 26, 2006, with Beast (Kelsey Grammer), Angel (Ben Foster), Shadowcat (Elliot Page) and Colossus (Daniel Cudmore) joining. Critics praised Singer's films for their dark, realistic tone, and their focus on prejudice as a subtext. Although Ratner's film was met with mixed reviews, it out-grossed both of its predecessors.

A sequel tetralogy that served as a prequel to the original trilogy started with X-Men: First Class. Following a young Professor X (James McAvoy), Magneto (Michael Fassbender), Beast (Nicholas Hoult), Mystique (Jennifer Lawrence), Havok (Lucas Till) and Banshee (Caleb Landry Jones) as the original team, the film was directed by Matthew Vaughn and released on June 3, 2011. X-Men: Days of Future Past, a sequel to both the original trilogy and X-Men: First Class, with Singer returning to direct, was released on May 23, 2014. The film centered around the original trilogy members using time travel to gain help from their younger counterparts of the prequel tetralogy. X-Men: Apocalypse was released on May 27, 2016, with Mystique leading the team of Beast, Quicksilver (Evan Peters), Storm (Alexandra Shipp), Nightcrawler (Kodi Smit-McPhee), Cyclops (Tye Sheridan) and Jean Grey (Sophie Turner). The tetralogy concluded with a fourth film, Dark Phoenix, written and directed by Simon Kinberg and released on June 7, 2019, and featured the same roster as Apocalypse.

Three spin-off films focusing on Wolverine were also released: X-Men Origins: Wolverine, an origin story of Wolverine that was directed by Gavin Hood, was released on May 1, 2009, followed by The Wolverine, directed by James Mangold and set in Japan, released on July 26, 2013. The series concluded with Logan, once again directed by Mangold and released on March 3, 2017. The film was set in 2029.

Two further spin-offs centering around Deadpool were released in 2016 and 2018. Deadpool, which features Colossus (Andre Tricoteux and voiced by Stefan Kapičić) and his X-Men trainee Negasonic Teenage Warhead (Brianna Hildebrand) was released on February 12, 2016, while Deadpool 2 was released on May 18, 2018, with returning X-Men members Colossus and Negasonic Teenage Warhead and new member Yukio (Shiori Kutsuna) helping Deadpool (Ryan Reynolds) as a X-Men trainee. The film also features cameo appearances of Professor X, Cyclops, Quicksilver, Storm, Nightcrawler and Beast from the sequel tetralogy. An adaptation of X-Force was also in development at 20th, with Jeff Wadlow writing and Drew Goddard directing.

Another spin-off and the final film of the franchise, The New Mutants, was released on August 28, 2020, directed by Josh Boone, who also co-wrote the screenplay with Knate Gwaltney.

=== Marvel Cinematic Universe ===
Marvel Studios launched the Marvel Cinematic Universe (MCU) in 2008, focused on the Avengers and their related characters, whose film rights they still owned. Marvel was then bought by Disney in 2009, but could not use the X-Men or other mutants, as their film rights still resided with Fox. However, an alternate version of the post-credits scene in Iron Man (2008) had Nick Fury specifically mention "assorted mutants" in regards to the larger universe he and Tony Stark were a part of. Quicksilver and the Scarlet Witch were an odd case, as they had strong ties with both the Avengers and the X-Men. The studios negotiated a deal so that they could share the characters' film rights on the stipulation Marvel Studios would be unable to make reference to their background as mutants or as Magneto's children, and that Fox could not allude to their history as Avengers members. While Pietro Maximoff / Quicksilver appeared in two MCU films, Captain America: The Winter Soldier (2014) and Avengers: Age of Ultron (2015), Wanda Maximoff / Scarlet Witch went on to become a regular character, appearing in six films in the franchise in addition to headlining her own television series. On December 14, 2017, Disney announced its intention to acquire 21st Century Fox's film and television studios, which would thereby result in the film rights to the X-Men and associated characters reverting to Marvel Studios. Disney CEO Bob Iger later confirmed that the X-Men would be integrated into the MCU alongside the Fantastic Four, Silver Surfer and Deadpool. The acquisition was completed on March 20, 2019.

After the deal, Charles Xavier / Professor X became the first mutant character to appear in the MCU, with Patrick Stewart reprising his role from the X-Men film series. He appeared in the film Doctor Strange in the Multiverse of Madness (2022) as an alternate version of Professor X from Earth-838, and as the leader of the Illuminati of this universe, alongside its other members meeting Doctor Strange and putting him for trial due to his travel in the Multiverse. He is later killed by Scarlet Witch of Earth-616 while rescuing her alternate version of Earth-838. Later that year, the MCU streaming series Ms. Marvel also made reference to the X-Men; in the series finale "No Normal", Kamala Khan is told by her friend Bruno that her genetics have a "mutation", underscored by an excerpt of the theme music from the 1992 X-Men series. Later, in the MCU streaming series She-Hulk: Attorney at Law episode "Superhuman Law", Wolverine gets mentioned in a news article on a blog site browsed by Jennifer Walters which alludes to a man with metal claws fighting in a bar brawl. Additionally, the end-credits of the episode "Mean, Green, and Straight Poured into These Jeans" depicts a graphic of Augustus Pugliese showing off his sneaker collection to Nikki Ramos, a pair of which are directly inspired by the color scheme of Wolverine's classic costume and the team gets mentioned by Jennifer in the season finale episode "Whose Show Is This?". In the mid-credits scene of the film The Marvels (2023), Monica Rambeau wakes up in X-Mansion and meets Hank McCoy / Beast after she gets trapped in an alternate universe. Kelsey Grammer reprises the role from 20th's X-Men films.

Deadpool & Wolverine is the fourth entry in Phase Five, with Shawn Levy directing and Reynolds reprising his role. Hugh Jackman, Kapičić, Hildebrand, Kutsuna and Dafne Keen reprised their roles as Wolverine, Colossus, Negasonic Teenage Warhead, Yukio and X-23 respectively. Additionally, Channing Tatum joins them as Gambit, who was attached to star as the titular character in an unproduced Gambit film. The film was released on July 26, 2024.

On March 26, 2025, Marvel Studios announced that Avengers: Doomsday will feature X-Men characters that have appeared in both the MCU and the Fox X-Men film series, including Grammer as Hank McCoy / Beast, Stewart as Charles Xavier / Professor X, Ian McKellen as Erik Lehnsherr / Magneto, Alan Cumming as Kurt Wagner / Nightcrawler, Rebecca Romijn as Raven Darkhölme / Mystique, James Marsden as Scott Summers / Cyclops, and Tatum as Remy LeBeau / Gambit.

On July 20, 2019, during San Diego Comic-Con, Marvel Studios head Kevin Feige announced that a film centered on mutants, which will be set in the Marvel Cinematic Universe, is in development. When asked if the film will be X-Men–titled, Feige said that the terms "X-Men" and "mutants" are interchangeable, and said that the MCU's take on the franchise will differ from 20th's. In 2023, after the end of the 2023 Writers Guild of America strike, Marvel Studios was reported to be planning to meet with potential writers for a new X-Men film later that year. In May 2024, Deadline Hollywood reported that screenwriter Michael Lesslie had been hired to write the first X-Men film set in the Marvel Cinematic Universe. On July 20, 2025, Jake Schreier was officially confirmed as the film's director, after previously collaborating with the studio on Thunderbolts*. On April 6, 2026, it was announced that Lee Sung Jin and Joanna Calo, who previously worked with Scheier on Thunderbolts*, would be rewriting the script to the X-Men film.

The 2026 film Spider-Man: Brand New Day introduced Jean Grey to the MCU, portrayed by Sadie Sink. During D23, it was announced that the cast would include Kit Connor as Cyclops, Samara Weaving as Emma Frost, Inde Navarrette as Rogue, Maya Boyd as Storm, Christopher Abbott as Professor X, and Adam Driver as Mister Sinister. On September 10, 2026, Asa Germann was cast as Angel. The film is scheduled to release on May 5, 2028.

== Video games ==
=== Early X-Men games ===
The first X-Men video game was released by Josh Toevs and LJN for the Nintendo Entertainment System and was titled The Uncanny X-Men. That same year (1989) a computer game was released called X-Men: Madness in Murderworld. Another title, X-Men II: The Fall of the Mutants was released the year after.

Konami created an X-Men arcade game in 1992, which featured six playable X-Men characters: Colossus, Cyclops, Dazzler, Nightcrawler, Storm and Wolverine.

In 1992, the X-Men teamed with Spider-Man for Spider-Man and the X-Men in Arcade's Revenge, released for the Super NES, Genesis, Game Gear and Game Boy.

The following years saw the games X-Men: Gamesmaster's Legacy and X-Men: Mojo World released for the Game Gear.

The X-Men made a few appearances in Spider-Man 2: Enter Electro. Professor X and Rogue run a Danger Room simulation for the player to train in. Beast appears in the first level to demonstrate the controller functions to the player.

In the 1990s, Sega released two X-Men video games for its Genesis; X-Men and X-Men 2: Clone Wars. Wolverine starred in a solo game in 1994 for both the Super NES and Genesis titled Wolverine: Adamantium Rage. That same year, the X-Men appeared in the X-Men: Mutant Apocalypse game for the Super NES.

X2: Wolverine's Revenge was a stealth-action game released as a tie-in for the film X2, for the sixth generation of video games starring Wolverine as the only playable character. It was released on April 14, 2003, produced by Marvel Games, Gene Pool, Activision and was released by 20th Century Fox, on PlayStation 2, GameCube, Xbox, Windows and Game Boy Advance.

=== Fighting games ===
The X-Men are featured in many 2-D and 3-D fighting games.

In order of release:

- X-Men fighting games:
  - X-Men: Children of the Atom (Capcom, 1994)
  - X-Men: Mutant Academy 2 (Activision/Paradox Development, 2001)
  - X-Men: Next Dimension (Activision/Paradox Development, 2002)
- Marvel fighting games. One of the X-Men characters are selectable fighters in one of the fighting games that features all Marvel characters:
  - Marvel Super Heroes (Capcom, 1995)
  - X-Men vs. Street Fighter (Capcom, 1996)
  - Marvel Super Heroes vs. Street Fighter (Capcom, 1997)
  - Marvel vs. Capcom (Capcom, 1998)
  - X-Men: Mutant Academy (Activision/Paradox Development, 2000)
  - Marvel vs. Capcom 2: New Age of Heroes (Capcom, 2000)
  - Marvel Nemesis: Rise of the Imperfects (EA Games, 2005)
  - Marvel vs. Capcom 3: Fate of Two Worlds (Capcom, 2011)
  - Ultimate Marvel vs. Capcom 3 (Capcom, 2011)
  - Marvel: Contest of Champions (Kabam, 2014)
  - Marvel Tokon: Fighting Souls (Arc System Works, 2026)

=== Film-based games ===
To coincide with the release of X-Men: The Last Stand, 20th Century, Activision, and Marvel Games released X-Men: The Official Game which filled in gaps between the two X-Men films X2 and The Last Stand, such as explaining Nightcrawler's absence.

=== X-Men Legends and Marvel: Ultimate Alliance ===
X-Men Legends and its sequel X-Men Legends II: Rise of Apocalypse are games that featured multiple X-Men as playable characters, with the latter game has Iron Man as a guest character that predates Marvel: Ultimate Alliance series.

Every installment of Marvel: Ultimate Alliance has featured the X-Men as one of the numerous playable characters:

Deadpool, Iceman, Storm, and Wolverine are playable in the major Marvel video game, Marvel: Ultimate Alliance. Colossus is playable on the Xbox 360, Wii and PS3 versions of the game, and Jean Grey is playable on the GBA version. Cyclops, Jean Grey, Nightcrawler, Professor X, Psylocke, Beast, Gambit, Emma Frost, Jubilee, Quicksilver, Shadowcat and Namor appear as NPC's on all versions while the Forge, Karma and Dr. Moira MacTaggert were mentioned by different characters. In addition, during a cut-scene, Beast, Colossus, Cyclops, Gambit, Magneto, Professor Xavier, Psylocke, and Shadowcat were seen defeated by Doctor Doom alongside the Hulk, while Jubilee only appears at the good ending segment of Omega Base side mission where the data to cure the Legacy Virus is secured. Xbox 360 owners were later able to download eight new playable characters for the game, including X-Men heroes and villains: Cyclops, Magneto, Nightcrawler and Sabretooth.

In Marvel: Ultimate Alliance 2, Wolverine, Deadpool, Iceman, Storm, Gambit, and Jean Grey are featured as playable characters while Cyclops and Psylocke are exclusive to PS2, PSP and Wii. While Colossus appears as an NPC. In the briefing that follows the Wakanda incident, Captain America and Iron Man mention that the other X-Men members have been absorbed into The Fold. Psylocke, Cable, Magneto and the Juggernaut were later added as downloadable characters for Marvel: Ultimate Alliance 2.

Wolverine, Storm, Nightcrawler, Psylocke, Deadpool, and Magneto appear as playable characters in Marvel Ultimate Alliance 3: The Black Order, while Mystique and Juggernaut appear as bosses. Cyclops, Colossus, Beast, and Professor X appear on a portrait in the X-Mansion when Magneto attacks it in the X-Men trailer; the former two are playable DLC characters while the other two also appear as non-playable helper characters.

=== Other games ===
The X-Men also featured in other games:

- Marvel: Future Fight (Netmarble, 2015)
- Marvel Rivals (NetEase, 2024) features members of the X-Men as playable characters. Storm, Wolverine, Magik, Psylocke, Magneto, Scarlet Witch, Cloak, Dagger, and Namor were playable in the game at launch, while Emma Frost, Jean Grey / Phoenix, Gambit, Rogue, Deadpool, Cyclops, and Jubilee were added to the game in later seasons.

== Books ==
Science of the X-Men by Linc Yaco and Karen Haber explains how different superpowers would work and how such abilities would affect the people that have them. The mutants featured include Quicksilver, Wolverine, Shadowcat, and Nightcrawler.

Several X-Men novels have been published.

Title	Author	Publisher	ISBN	Release Date	Notes
The Marvel Superheroes	Len Wein; Marv Wolfman (editors)	Pocket Books	0671820915 / 9780671820916	August 1979	Pocket Books series (1978–1979) #9; short story collection; includes stories featuring the Avengers, Daredevil, the X-Men, and the Hulk.
X-Men: Cyclops and Phoenix	Paul Mantell; Avery Hart	Random House	0679876596 / 9780679876595	October 1995	Young adult novel; "based on comics by Scott Lobdell"
X-Men: Sabretooth Unleashed	Vicki Kamida	Random House	0679876618 / 9780679876618	October 1995	Young adult novel; "based on comics by Larry Hama and Fabian Nicieza"
X-Men: Mutant Empire Book One: Siege	Christopher Golden	Berkley Boulevard/BPMC	1572971142 / 9781572971141	May 1996	First in Mutant Empire trilogy; is followed by Mutant Empire Book Two: Sanctuary
The Ultimate X-Men	Stan Lee (editor)	Berkley Boulevard/BPMC	1572972173 / 9781572972179	October 1996	Short story collection
X-Men: Mutant Empire Book Two: Sanctuary	Christopher Golden	Berkley Boulevard/BPMC	1572971800 / 9781572971806	November 1996	Second in Mutant Empire trilogy; is followed by Mutant Empire Book Three: Salvation
X-Men: Mutant Empire Book Three: Salvation	Christopher Golden	Berkley Boulevard/BPMC	1572972475 / 9781572972476	May 1997	Third in Mutant Empire trilogy
Generation X	Scott Lobdell; Elliot S. Maggin	Berkley Boulevard/BPMC	1572972238 / 9781572972230	June 1997	
X-Men: Smoke and Mirrors	Eluki Bes Shahar	Berkley Boulevard/BPMC	1572972912 / 9781572972919	September 1997	
X-Men: Empire's End	Diane Duane	Putnam/BPMC (hardback); Berkley Boulevard/BPMC (paperback)	0399143343 / 9780399143342 (hardback); 0425164489; 9780425164488 (paperback)	October 1997 (hardback); September 1998 (paperback)	
X-Men: The Jewels of Cyttorak	Dean Wesley Smith	Berkley Boulevard/BPMC	1572973293 / 9781572973299	December 1997	
X-Men: Law of the Jungle	Dave Smeds	Berkley Boulevard/BPMC	0425164861 / 9780425164860	March 1998	
X-Men: Prisoner X	Ann Nocenti	Berkley Boulevard/BPMC	0425164934 / 9780425164938	May 1998	
Star Trek: The Next Generation/X-Men: Planet X	Michael Jan Friedman	Pocket Books	0671019163 / 9780671019167	May 1998	One of three separate crossovers between Marvel (all three featuring the X-Men) and Star Trek (the other two in the comics); Marvel at the time was publishing Star Trek comics (1996–1998)
X-Men and Spider-Man: Time's Arrow Book 1: The Past	Tom DeFalco; Jason Henderson	Berkley Boulevard/BPMC	0425164527 / 9780425164525	July 1998	First in Time's Arrow trilogy; is followed by Time's Arrow Book 2: The Present
X-Men and Spider-Man: Time's Arrow Book 2: The Present	Tom DeFalco; Adam-Troy Castro	Berkley Boulevard/BPMC	0425164152 / 9780425164150	August 1998	Second in Time's Arrow trilogy; is followed by Time's Arrow Book 3: The Future
X-Men and Spider-Man: Time's Arrow Book 3: The Future	Tom DeFalco; Eluki Bes Shahar	Berkley Boulevard/BPMC	0425165000 / 9780425165003	September 1998	Third in Time's Arrow trilogy
X-Men: Codename Wolverine	Christopher Golden	Putnam/BPMC (hardback); Berkley Boulevard/BPMC (paperback)	0399144501 / 9780399144509 (hardback); 0425171116; 9780425171110 (paperback)	October 1998 (hardback); May 2000 (paperback)	
Generation X: Crossroads	J. Steven York	Berkley Boulevard/BPMC	0425166317 / 9780425166314	November 1998	
X-Men: Soul Killer	Richard Lee Byers	Berkley Boulevard/BPMC	0425167372 / 9780425167373	February 1999	
X-Men and the Avengers: Gamma Quest Book 1: Lost and Found	Greg Cox	Berkley Boulevard/BPMC	0425169731 / 9780425169735	July 1999	First in Gamma Quest trilogy; is followed by Gamma Quest Book 2: Search and Rescue
X-Men and the Avengers: Gamma Quest Book 2: Search and Rescue	Greg Cox	Berkley Boulevard/BPMC	0425169898 / 9780425169896	August 1999	Second in Gamma Quest trilogy; is followed by Gamma Quest Book 3: Friend or Foe?
X-Men and the Avengers: Gamma Quest Book 2: Friend or Foe?	Greg Cox	Berkley Boulevard	0425170381 / 9780425170380	June 2000	Third in Gamma Quest trilogy
X-Men Legends	Stan Lee (editor)	Berkley Boulevard	0425170829 / 9780425170823	June 2000	Short story collection
X-Men: Shadows of the Past	Michael Jan Friedman	BP Books/iBooks	0743400186 / 9780743400183 (hardback); 074342378X / 978-0743423786 (paperback)	June 2000 (hardback); June 2001 (paperback)	
X-Men	Kristine Kathryn Rusch, Dean Wesley Smith	Del Rey	0345440951 / 9780345440952	June 2000	Novelization of 2000 X-Men movie
X-Men/Doctor Doom: The Chaos Engine Book One	Steven A. Roman	BP Books/iBooks	0613950569 / 978-0613950565 (hardback); 0743400194; 9780743400190 (paperback); 0743434838 / 9780743434836 (paperback)	July 2000 (hardback); July 2000 (paperback); August 2001 (paperback)	First in Chaos Engine trilogy; is followed by X-Men/Magneto: The Chaos Engine Book Two
X-Men/Magneto: The Chaos Engine Book Two	Steven A. Roman	BP Books/iBooks	0613950569 / 9780613950565 (hardback); 0743400232 / 9780743400237 (paperback); 0743445465 / 9780743445467 (paperback)	July 2000 (hardback); January 2002 (paperback); December 2002 (paperback)	Second in Chaos Engine trilogy; is followed by X-Men/Red Skull: The Chaos Engine Book Three
Five Decades of the X-Men	Stan Lee (editor)	BP Books/iBooks	0743435001 / 9780743435000 (paperback); 0743475011 / 9780743475013 (paperback)	March 2002 (paperback); April 2003 (paperback)	Short story collection
X-Men: The Legacy Quest Book One	Steve Lyons	BP Books/iBooks	074344468X / 9780743444682 (paperback); 0743458486 / 9780743458481 (paperback)	June 2002 (paperback); April 2003 (paperback)	First in The Legacy Quest trilogy; is followed by The Legacy Quest Book Two
X-Men: The Legacy Quest Book Two	Steve Lyons	BP Books/iBooks	0743452437 / 9780743452434 (paperback); 0743474449 / 9780743474443 (paperback)	July 2002 (paperback); April 2003 (paperback)	Second in The Legacy Quest trilogy; is followed by The Legacy Quest Book Three
X-Men: The Legacy Quest Book Three	Steve Lyons	BP Books/iBooks	0743452666 / 9780743452663 (paperback); 0743475194 / 9780743475198 (paperback)	October 2002 (paperback); September 2003 (paperback)	Third in The Legacy Quest trilogy
X-Men/Red Skull: The Chaos Engine Book Three	Steven A. Roman	BP Books/iBooks	0743452801 / 9780743452809 (paperback); 0743479580 / 9780743479585 (paperback)	December 2002 (paperback); October 2003 (paperback)	Third in Chaos Engine trilogy
X-Men 2	Chris Claremont	Del Rey	0345461967 / 9780345461964	March 2003	Novelization of 2003 X-Men 2 movie
Wolverine: Weapon X	Marc Cerasini	Marvel (hardback); Pocket Books (paperback)	0785116052 / 9780785116059 (hardback); 141652164X / 9781416521648 (paperback)	November 2004 (hardback); October 2005 (paperback)	Short lived attempt by Marvel to publish their licensed novels under their own imprint; lasted just this one hardcover release
The X-Men: Dark Mirror	Marjorie M. Liu	Pocket Books	141651063X / 9781416510635	December 2005	
The X-Men: Watchers on the Walls	Christopher L. Bennett	Pocket Books	1416510672 / 9781416510673	April 2006	
X-Men: The Last Stand	Chris Claremont	Del Rey	0345492110 / 9780345492111	May 2006	Novelization of 2006 X-Men: The Last Stand movie
Wolverine: Road of Bones	David Mack	Pocket Books	1416510699 / 978-1416510697	October 2006	
Wolverine: Lifeblood	Hugh Matthews	Pocket Books	1416510737 / 978-1416510734	February 2007	
X-Men: The Return	Chris Roberson	Pocket Books	1416510753 / 9781416510758	April 2007	
Wolverine: Violent Tendencies	Marc Cerasini	Pocket Books	1416510745 / 9781416510741	October 2007	
Astonishing X-Men: Gifted	Peter David	Marvel		September 12, 2012	Novelization and adaptation of the 2004 comic book story arc Gifted within the Astonishing X-Men ongoing series originally written by Joss Whedon
X-Men: Days of Future Past	Alex Irvine	Marvel	978-1-302-48954-0	May 17, 2016	Novelization and adaptation of the 1980 comic book story arc by Chris Claremont and John Bryne
X-Men: The Dark Phoenix Saga	Stuart Moore	Titan Books	9781789090628 / 9781789090635	May 14, 2019	Novelization and adaptation of the comic book story arc by Chris Claremont, John Bryne, and Dave Cockrum

== Merchandise ==
The brand did $85 million in merch sales in 1994.

== See also ==
- Wolverine in other media
- Professor X in other media
- Cyclops in other media
- Storm in other media
- Apocalypse in other media
- Psylocke in other media
- Deadpool in other media
