= Cory Barlog =

American video game developer

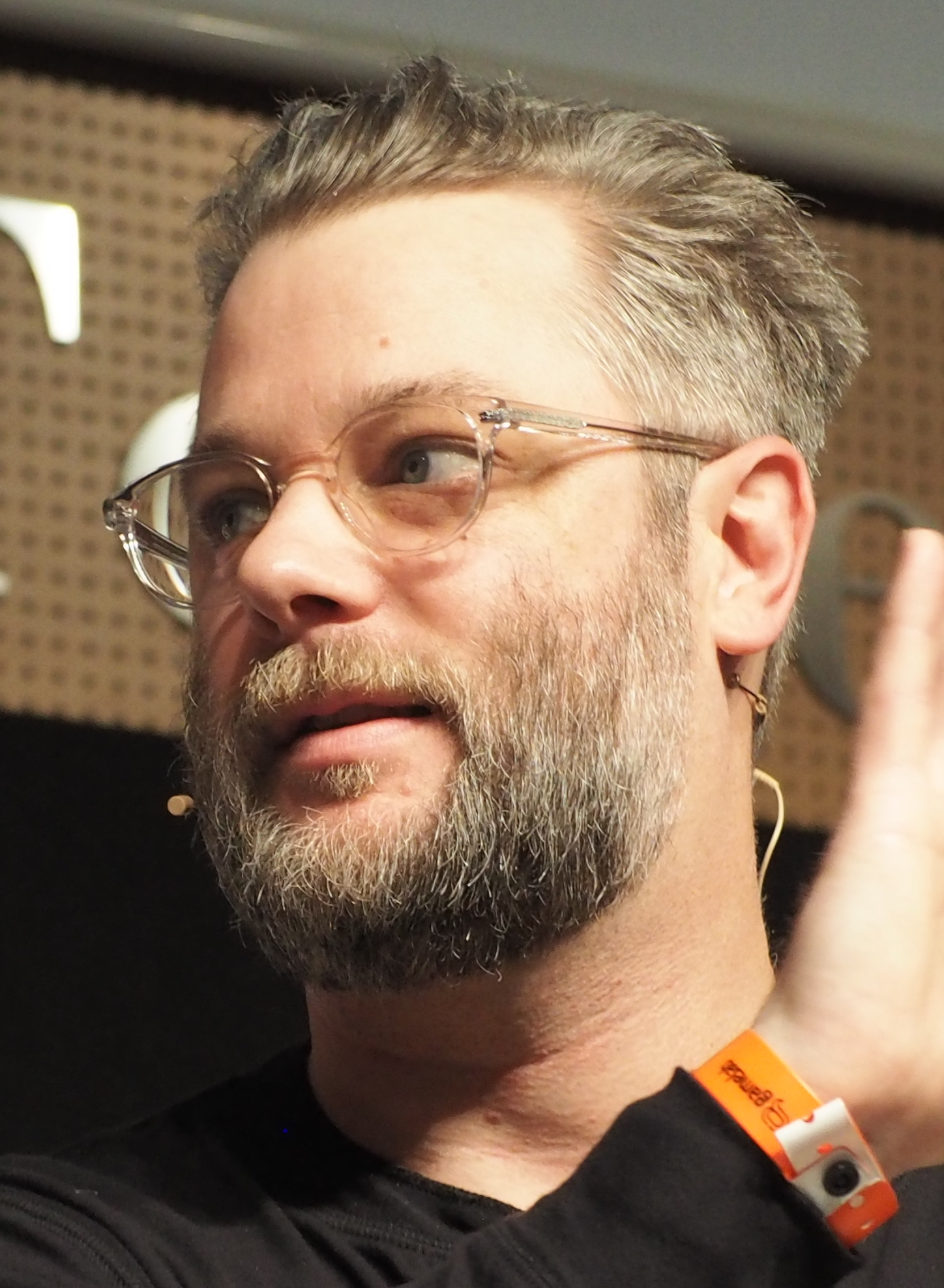
- Barlog in June 2019
- Born: September 2, 1975 (age 51)
- Occupations: Video game designer; director; writer
- Years active: 2000–present
- Known for: God of War series

Cory Barlog (born September 2, 1975) is an American video game designer, director, and writer who is the current creative director of video game development at Santa Monica Studio. He is best known for his work on the God of War series.

== Early life ==
Barlog was born on September 2, 1975, the son of fantasy novelist J. M. Barlog.

== Career ==
In his early career, Barlog worked as a lead animator at Paradox Development on Backyard Wrestling: Don't Try This at Home and X-Men: Next Dimension. After joining Santa Monica Studio, he was the lead animator for God of War (2005) and directed God of War II (2007), for which he won a BAFTA for his writing work on the game. He also served as game director of God of War III (2010) for the first eight months of its development. Although not part of Sony at the time, he helped in writing God of War: Ghost of Sparta (2010).

Barlog was a keynote speaker at ECAROcon 2008, and later worked at LucasArts. In an interview, he announced that he was working on a tie-in video game for the 2015 film Mad Max: Fury Road. He was reported to be in Sweden to develop the title with Avalanche Studios, best known for Just Cause. Despite various gaming websites confirming that the game was in development over the coming years, Barlog had left Avalanche Studios early in its development and the game never materialized.

In March 2012, it was announced that Barlog had joined Crystal Dynamics to direct the cinematics for the new Tomb Raider game and direct an unannounced game. However, he left the company in April 2013.

In August 2013, it was announced that Barlog would return to Santa Monica Studio. He is the studio's creative director and directed God of War (2018). For the game, he won awards for Best Game Direction and Game of the Year at The Game Awards 2018, Outstanding Achievement in Game Direction and Game of the Year at the 22nd Annual D.I.C.E. Awards, and the BAFTA Games Award for Best Game. He also wrote the foreword to the novelization of the game, which was written by his father. He also produced the sequel God of War Ragnarök (2022).

In February 2025, Barlog participated in a panel with Neil Druckmann at the D.I.C.E. Summit, where they discussed their respective experiences as studio leaders.

== Ludography ==
Year	Game	Role	Studio
1999	Requiem: Avenging Angel	Artist	Cyclone Studios
2000	Rock 'em Sock 'em Robots Arena	Animator	Paradox Development
2002	X-Men: Next Dimension	Lead animator	Paradox Development
2003	Backyard Wrestling: Don't Try This at Home	Lead animator	Paradox Development
2005	God of War	Lead animator	Santa Monica Studio
2007	God of War II	Game director, story writer	Santa Monica Studio
2008	God of War: Chains of Olympus	Story writer	Santa Monica Studio
2010	God of War III	Initial design, story layout	Santa Monica Studio
2010	God of War: Ghost of Sparta	Story writer	Santa Monica Studio
2013	Tomb Raider	Cinematics director	Crystal Dynamics
2018	God of War	Game director, story writer	Santa Monica Studio
2022	God of War Ragnarök	Creative director, producer	Santa Monica Studio
