= List of cancelled PlayStation games =

The original PlayStation is a video game console released by Sony in late 1994. This list documents games that were announced for the PlayStation at some point, but did not end up being released for it in any capacity.

== Games ==
There are currently 97 games on this list. (Note: This number is always up to date by this script.)

List of cancelled Nintendo 64 games
| Title(s) | Notes/Reasons | Developer | Publisher |
|---|---|---|---|
| 7 Blades | Work on the game began in 1998 for the original PlayStation, but development was shifted to the PlayStation 2, where the game released in late 2000, because the developers needed stronger hardware to be able render more characters onscreen concurrently. | Konami | Konami |
| Abuse | Originally released in 1996 on PC platforms, versions for the Sega Saturn and PlayStation were announced at E3 1996, but never materialized. | Crack dot Com | Vic Tokai |
| Æon Flux (1996) | A video game adaptation of the Æon Flux television series broadcast from 1991 to 1995 was scheduled for release on PlayStation in 1996. Development was far enough along for playable promotional copies to be sent out to magazines for previews. However, during development, publisher Viacom New Media went through a corporate merger and lost the rights to publish games from the franchise, resulting in the game's cancellation. Some of the content and assets were reworked into the poorly-received Pax Corpus (1997). The game is completely unrelated to the Æon Flux (2005) video game released for PlayStation 2 and the original Xbox. | Cryo Interactive | Viacom New Media |
| Aliens Versus Predator | In 1995, a video game adaptation of the Alien vs. Predator crossover franchise was announced for release in 1997 for the PlayStation, Sega Saturn, and Microsoft Windows. The console version were in development into 1997, with the PlayStation version being present at E3 1997, but after delays, only the Windows version ever materialized when the game released in 1999. A Dreamcast version was later reported on by magazines, though it never materialized either. | Rebellion Developments | Fox Interactive |
| Aquaria | In 1997, Lobotomy Software announced their first Nintendo 64 game, Aquaria. Described as resembling an underwater version of Nights into Dreams, Enix was also said to be developing a port of the game for PlayStation. However, neither version ever released. | Lobotomy Software | Enix |
| BattleSport II / BioSwarm | A sequel to BattleSport (1997) was planned for the Nintendo 64 and PlayStation, but never released for any system. | Cyclone Studios | 3DO |
| Black & White | One of multiple console versions of the 2001 PC release in development, but ultimately cancelled. The version for the original PlayStation was unique in that it was the only console substantially weaker than the PC version, requiring extensive cut backs in graphics and gameplay to get running on the console. The game was scheduled for release in mid-2001, over a year after the release of the PlayStation 2. After its cancellation, focus was shifted on versions for the PS2, Dreamcast, and the original Xbox, though none of these ever materialized either. | Krisalis Software, Lionhead Studios | |
| Blackthorne | Shortly after the game's initial release on SNES, publisher Interplay decided against a Sega Genesis port in favor of concentrating on more powerful hardware. Sega 32X, Saturn, and PlayStation versions were announced, though of those, only the 32X version released. | Blizzard Entertainment | Interplay Entertainment |
| BloodStorm | Released in arcades in 1994, Sega Saturn and PlayStation ports were announced, but neither console version ever materialized. | Incredible Technologies | Strata |
| Bubble Symphony / Bubble Bobble II | After its 1994 release as an arcade game, console versions were announced. While the announced Sega Saturn version released in 1997, a PlayStation version, far enough along to be slated for a January 1998 release, never materialized. | Taito | Virgin Interactive |
| Buffy the Vampire Slayer | Originally in development for the PlayStation, Dreamcast and PC, publisher Fox Interactive announced in April 2001 that the title would become an Xbox exclusive. | The Collective | Fox Interactive |
| Burn Cycle | Released for the CD-i in 1994, console ports for the Sega Saturn and PlayStation were announced in 1996, but neither ever surfaced. | TripMedia | Philips Interactive Media |
| Converse Hardcore Hoops / Converse City Ball Tour | Announced at E3 1995 for the Sega Saturn, Sega Genesis, Sega 32X, SNES, PlayStation, and PC, the game was reportedly far in development, but was cancelled and never released in any capacity. Despite a large budget and a then-impressive 15,000 frames of animations, the game reported garnered very negative reactions from test audiences, who did not like the game's half-court, two versus two set up. | | Virgin Interactive |
| Creation | With work starting in the early 1990s, the game featured a lengthy and troubled development process. Versions for the Sega Saturn, PlayStation, Amiga CD32, and various PC platforms were announced over time, though no version of the game was ever released. | Bullfrog Productions | |
| Crime Patrol | After releasing as an arcade game and a few PC and consoles in 1993 and 1994, ports to Sega Saturn and PlayStation were announced for 1996, but neither ever released. | American Laser Games | American Laser Games |
| Dirty War | Dirty War was a multiplayer strategy tactical game that was in development by New Zealand-based Sidhe Interactive for the PlayStation. Around six people were working on it. It was originally scheduled for release in 1999, but was later put on hold indefinitely. | Sidhe Interactive | |
| The Dark Half: Endsville | Q2 1998 | Bits Studios | THQ |
| Dark Sun: Shattered Lands | Released for PC platforms in 1993 by Strategic Simulations, console versions by Data East were announced for Sega Saturn and PlayStation for release in 1996, but neither version ever materialized. | Strategic Simulations | Data East |
| Deadly Honor | An action game featuring actor Steven Seagal announced for a late 1997 release for both the PlayStation and the Nintendo 64, the game was cancelled in its beta stages and never released in any capacity for either platform. | TecMagik | TecMagik |
| Demolition Man | A video game adaptation of the film Demolition Man (1993) was announced for a number of video game consoles. While versions for Sega Genesis, Sega CD, SNES, and 3DO released across 1995, the PlayStation version never materialized. | Virgin Interactive | Virgin Interactive |
| Down in the Dumps | Originally for the CD-i, ports for the Sega Saturn and PlayStation were announced for late 1996 after its failure, though only releases for PC platforms every materialized. | Haiku Studios | Philips Interactive Media |
| Dragon Sword | Announced in 1997 as a The Legend of Zelda inspired game coming to the Nintendo 64 first, and Windows and the PlayStation sometime after, the game went through many changes over its multiple years of development, including a transition into a simpler, Golden Axe styled action game. Despite being near completion, the game was cancelled in 2001 due to its publisher pulling out, citing fears regarding its profitability. | Interactive Studios | MGM Interactive |
| Duckman: The Graphic Adventures of a Private Dick | A video game adaptation of the Duckman animated television series was in development concurrently for Windows and PlayStation, and scheduled for release in 1997, the year of its final season. However, only the Windows version ever materialized. | Illusions Gaming Company | Playmates Interactive |
| Dungeon Keeper | Released on PC platforms in 1997, Sega Saturn and PlayStation versions were in development and due for release in 1997, but were both cancelled. | Bullfrog Productions | Electronic Arts |
| Dungeon Keeper 2 | Originally announced at E3 1998 with a release planned by the end of the same year on the Windows and the original PlayStation, when the game actually released in 1999, only a Windows version materialized. | Bullfrog Productions | Electronic Arts |
| Dungeons & Dragons Collection | Originally released on the Sega Saturn in 1999, a PlayStation version was also in development, but cancelled in favor of Capcom focusing on other projects instead. | Capcom | Capcom |
| Dungeons & Dragons: Tower of Doom | Originally released as an arcade game in 1994, the game was released as part of the Dungeons & Dragons Collection (1999) on the Sega Saturn, but its release on PlayStation, both stand-alone and as part of Collection, were cancelled so Capcom could focus on other projects instead. | Capcom | Capcom |
| Earthworm Jim 3D | Development started on the PlayStation, but was cancelled in favor of a Nintendo 64 version by 1997, which was the only console it appeared on by its release in 1999. | Shiny Entertainment | Playmates Interactive |
| Enemy Zero | The game was initially announced for release for the PlayStation console. However, Kenji Eno, leader of the development team at Warp, became upset with Sony after they failed to produce as many copies as previously agreed upon, of Warp's previous game, D (1995). The lead to him cancelling the PlayStation of Enemy Zero in favor of developing it for the Sega Saturn, where it released in 1996. | Warp | Sony |
| Exodus / Big Guns | The game started as a demo named Big Guns that developer Neversoft created to attract interest in getting a publishing deal from a game publisher. They attracted the interest of Shiny Entertainment, though they asked the team to use the game engine to facilitate a port their PC game MDK (1997) to the PlayStation first. The teams continued to work on the game idea concurrently, and upon MDK being a success, secured a publishing deal with Sony. The game changed a lot in their collaboration with Sony, including changing the name to Exodus due to being unable to secure the rights to Big Guns, and moving from a 3D action/shoot mech game, into more of a 3D Metroid and Mega Man inspired design. Sony cancelled the game in November 1997, though the game engine was later re-used for future Neversoft releases Apocalypse (1998) and early entries in the Tony Hawk's Pro Skater series. | Neversoft Entertainment | Sony Computer Entertainment |
| Evergrace | Development began on the PlayStation 2, but mid-way through, the development on a scaled-back PS1 version was started in hopes of reaching a larger audience. Unhappy with the progress on the PS1 version, it was cancelled in favor of only releasing the original PS2 version. | FromSoftware | Agetec |
| Fortris | Originally announced as Fortris by developer Promethean Designs for the Dreamcast and PlayStation 1, Majesco obtained to the rights for the game, moved development to the Game Boy Advance under their own internal development team, and released it only for the Game Boy Advance in 2001. | Promethean Designs | Majesco |
| Ghost Rider | 1996 | Neversoft Entertainment | Crystal Dynamics |
| Hexen II | Versions of the 1997 PC release were announced for the Sega Saturn and PlayStation by Activision, but never materialized. | Raven Software | Activision |
| HyperBlade / Hockeydrome | Originally announced as Hockeydrone, a futuristic, ultraviolent version of the sport of hockey for the 32X, Sega Saturn, and the original PlayStation, by the time the game was released under its final name, HyperBlade, in November 1996, only a version for Windows was released. | Wizbang! Software Productions | Activision |
| I Have No Mouth, and I Must Scream | Early in development, Sega CD and PlayStation versions was reported to be in development, though it was not widely publicized, and only versions for various PC platforms ever released. | Cyberdreams | Cyberdreams |
| Ico | The game spent 2 years in development for the original PlayStation, until the development team decided that the hardware was not powerful enough to carry out Director Fumito Ueda's vision for the game. In order to stick to the plan, the PS1 version was cancelled as they transitioned it to the PlayStation 2, where it released in 2001. | Team Ico | Sony Computer Entertainment |
| Independence War 2: Edge of Chaos | Scheduled for release for the PlayStation, Dreamcast, Windows, and Nintendo 64, none of the console versions ever ended up releasing; only the Windows version released in 2001. | Particle Systems | Infogrames |
| The Indestructibles | Announced for Sega Saturn and the PlayStation, the game was not released in any capacity, being cancelled after a lengthy and troubled development period. | Bullfrog Productions | Bullfrog Productions |
| Indiana Jones and the Infernal Machine | Development originally started as PC game, with a later PlayStation version planned. However, early in development, the PS1 version was cancelled in favor of a Nintendo 64 version instead; PC and N64 versions released in 1999 and 2000 respectively. | LucasArts | LucasArts |
| Iron Soldier 2 | 1997 | Eclipse Software Design | |
| Jeff Gordon XS Racing | It was initially planned for release on PlayStation, Nintendo 64, Windows, and Game Boy Color. However, the PlayStation and N64 versions were cancelled, with only the Windows and GBC versions releasing. | Real Sports | ASC Games |
| The Journeyman Project: Pegasus Prime (US version) | Q2, 1997 | Presto Studios | Acclaim Entertainment |
| Killing Time | 1996 | Logicware | Acclaim Entertainment |
| Kingdom O' Magic | 1996 | Sales Curve Interactive | Sales Curve Interactive |
| Kiss: Psycho Circus: The Nightmare Child | 2000 | Third Law Interactive | |
| The Last Express | 1997 | GAMEBANK | Broderbund |
| Legacy of Kain: Soul Reaver 2 | The project was initially started as a project on Dreamcast and the PlayStation, but in May 2000, after putting together a mock-up of what could be accomplished on PlayStation 2 for an E3 2000 presentation, Eidos Interactive decided to cancel the prior version and shift to a PS2 and Windows release, which occurred in late 2001. | Crystal Dynamics | Eidos Interactive |
| Legions of the Undead | 1995 | Rebellion Developments | |
| Lego Stunt Rally | 2000 | Asylum Entertainment | Lego Media |
| Mace: The Dark Age | 1997 | Midway Games | Midway Games |
| Madden NFL 96 | 1995 | Visual Concepts | EA Sports |
| Major Damage | 1996 | Capcom | Sony Computer Entertainment |
| Malice | 2004 | Argonaut Games | Fox Interactive |
| Marvel 2099: One Nation Under Doom | 1997 | Mindscape | Capcom |
| Messiah | Originally announced for Dreamcast, PlayStation, and Windows, only the Windows version ever released. The Dreamcast version was delayed and eventually cancelled due to the slow hardware sales of the Dreamcast. | Shiny Entertainment | Interplay Entertainment |
| Metal Slug 6 | 2006 | SNK | |
| Monster Force | 2001 | Digital Eclipse Software | Konami |
| Myth: History in the Making | A revival of Myth: History in the Making (1989) was in development for Nintendo 64, PlayStation, Sega Saturn, and Windows. The release was delayed due to a legal dispute with Eidos Interactive, who were already releasing their own Myth series, and the game ultimately never materialized for any system. | System 3 | |
| Neopets: The Darkest Faerie | An action-adventure game based on the Neopets website was announced at E3 2003 and would be released in November of that year. At the end of October 2003, it was announced that the PlayStation version would be scrapped in favor of a PlayStation 2 version, with the site's management stating that the system couldn't achieve everything they wanted to do for the game. The game would be released near the end of 2005. | The Code Monkeys | Sony Computer Entertainment |
| NHL 96 | 1995 | EA Sports | EA Sports |
| NHL Blades of Steel '99 | 1999 | Konami | Konami |
| Omikron: The Nomad Soul | A port of Omikron: The Nomad Soul (1999) was planned for release on PlayStation in May 2000. The port was roughly 70% complete before being cancelled, with Eidos alleging the PlayStation was not powerful enough to run the game, though Quantic Dream disputed this. | Quantic Dream | Eidos Interactive |
| Onimusha: Warlords | 1997 | Capcom | Capcom |
| Powerslide | After its 1998 Windows release, versions for the PlayStation, arcades, and Nintendo 64 were announced, though none of the other versions ever materialized. | Ratbag Games | GT Interactive |
| Prince of Persia 3D | 1999 | Red Orb Entertainment | Red Orb Entertainment |
| The Punisher | 1996 | Crystal Dynamics | Capcom |
| Quake | 1997 | Lobotomy Software | |
| Rayman II | Summer 1996 | Ubisoft | |
| Raze | Originally announced as Realms of Valor for Nintendo 64, Raze was a four-player 3D fighting game based in the Dungeons & Dragons Forgotten Realms setting. By 2000, the game had shifted development to the PlayStation, but was ultimately never released in any capacity. | Interplay Entertainment | Interplay Entertainment |
| Rebel Moon Rising | 1997 | Fenris Wolf | GT Interactive |
| Redline | 1997 | Accolade | Accolade |
| Ripper | 1996 | Take-Two Interactive | Take-Two Interactive |
| Rocket Jockey | 1997 | Rocket Science Games | |
| Rocky Interactive Horror Show | 1999 | On-Line Entertainment | On-Line Entertainment |
| Rollerball | 1998 | | MGM Interactive |
| Scooby-Doo! Classic Creep Capers | 2001 | Terraglyph Interactive Studios | |
| Space Bunnies Must Die! | Console versions of the 1998 Windows release were scheduled for the PlayStation and Nintendo 64, but never released, as the game was a serious commercial failure for its developers Ripcord Games, who were bought out by investors due to its poor performance. It was seen as a poor attempt to cash in on the popularity of the Tomb Raider franchise. | Jinx/Ripcord Games | Take-Two Interactive |
| Spec Ops: Rangers Lead the Way | 1997 | Zombie Studios | BMG Interactive |
| Spiral Saga | 1998 | Software Creations | Sony Computer Entertainment Europe |
| Spy Fox: "Operation Ozone" | A PlayStation port of the Humongous Entertainment PC game was listed on a British video game website in September 2002 and was available for pre-orders, but such a port never materialized. | | Infogrames |
| Star Trek: Starfleet Academy | 1997 | Interplay Entertainment | Interplay Entertainment |
| Star Wars: Episode I Racer | 1999 | LucasArts | LucasArts |
| Superman | 2000 | BlueSky Software | Titus Interactive |
| Test Drive Cycles | A proposed spinoff of the Test Drive series of video games that would have featured motorbike racing. Planned for release in 2000, all versions of the game (PlayStation, Dreamcast, Windows) were cancelled outside of a vastly different Game Boy Color version. | Infogrames North America | Infogrames North America |
| Thomas The Tank Engine And Friends | An educational game based on the Thomas the Tank Engine & Friends franchise was planned for release, but was cancelled early in development. | Runecraft | Infogrames |
| Three Dirty Dwarves | 1996 | Appaloosa Interactive | SegaSoft |
| Thrill Kill | This fighting game was anticipated for its extreme violence and sexual content, and was one of the first titles to receive an AO rating. The game was planned for an October 1998 release, but in August, Virgin Interactive's North American operations were purchased by Electronic Arts. EA declined to publish the game or sell the rights to another company, deeming it too graphic for release. | Paradox Development | Virgin Interactive |
| Titan A.E. | Fall 2000 | Blitz Games | |
| Tommy Thunder | Originally announced for the Nintendo 64, development later shifted to the PlayStation, though this version also went unreleased. | Player 1 Studios | ASC Games |
| Too Human | 1999 | Silicon Knights | |
| Transformers | In 1994, Takara announced that the cancellation of a Transformers game being developed for SNES, and that the project would instead be released in 1995 on the next generation of consoles, including the PlayStation. However, these ports were also never released. | Argonaut Software | Takara |
| Varuna's Forces | 1996 | Accent Media Productions | |
| Waterworld | 1995 | Ocean Software | |
| Wild Wild West: The Steel Assassin | 1999 | SouthPeak Interactive | SouthPeak Interactive |
| Wonder Project J2 | After releasing on the Nintendo 64 in 1996, an extended version was announced for the PS1 for release in the following year. This version would have made use of the more extensive data space of PS1 CD-ROMs compared to the Nintendo 64 Game Pak cartridges, though this version never materialized. | Givro Corporation | Enix |
| Zero 5 | 1997 | Caspian Software | |
