= Thrill Kill =

Unreleased 1998 fighting video game

- European cover art
- Developer: Paradox Development
- Publisher: Virgin Interactive
- Producers: Harvard Bonin; Kevin Mulhall
- Designer: Benjamin Kutcher
- Programmer: Peter Jefferies
- Artist: Paul Interrante
- Writer: Brian Gomez
- Composer: Keith Arem
- Platform: PlayStation
- Release: Cancelled
- Genre: Fighting
- Modes: Single-player, multiplayer

Thrill Kill is a cancelled fighting game developed by Paradox Development for the PlayStation. Originally intended to be released in 1998, the game's plot involves ten people who all get sent to Hell after dying on Earth and are forced by Marukka, the Goddess of Secrets, to fight to the death for a chance at reincarnation. It was marketed as the first four-player 3D fighting game, with up to four players being able to play at once using the PlayStation Multitap. Each player is given a "kill meter" that increases with each successful attack and, once filled, executes a gory finishing move called a "Thrill Kill".

Thrill Kill began development as Earth Monster, a sports game based on the Mesoamerican ballgame in which characters attacked one another as they tried to get a ball into a hoop. As the developers were repeatedly pushed by publisher Virgin Interactive to make the game more violent, Earth Monster's concept was scrapped in favor of an adult-oriented, BDSM-themed fighting game. During development, the game gained a large following for its overtly sexual and gory content, and received one of the first-ever "Adults Only" (AO) ratings from the Entertainment Software Rating Board (ESRB), also becoming the first game to receive the rating for its violence.

Reviews of the beta version of Thrill Kill considered it fun but unfinished. The game was scheduled to be released by Virgin Interactive in October 1998; however, Electronic Arts gained the publishing rights upon purchasing Virgin's North American operations in August of that year, and chose not to release the game or sell it to other publishers due to its graphic content. Bootleg versions of the game were uploaded to pirating websites, and it became especially popular as a downloaded ISO. Following its cancellation, Thrill Kill was reskinned to develop the 1999 Activision game Wu-Tang: Shaolin Style, also developed by Paradox, who went on to use the Thrill Kill engine in several of their other games.

== Gameplay ==
Screenshot of a fight between Belladonna, Tormentor, Oddball, and The Imp

The gameplay consists of up to four opponents in a closed 3D room fighting to kill one another one-by-one using gory special moves known as "Thrill Kills". The four attack buttons correspond to each character's arms and legs, while attacks are blocked by standing still or by holding down the guard button. Double tapping in any direction allows players to dash. Each character has four throws, including a "Swap Throw", which causes the player who performs it and the opponent to switch places, and a "Hold Throw", which pins opponents down in front of the character that performs it. Characters can also perform both high and low counter hits.

Instead of the usual life bar, characters have a "kill meter" that increases with each successful attack performed. Whichever character fills this meter first must use a Thrill Kill on one other opponent of their choice, which kills them and removes them from the round. The manner of the kill depends on the button input upon grabbing the other character. The round then repeats without the defeated character, with the character who performed a Thrill Kill in the prior round earning a small boost to their kill meter at the start of the round. This continues until there are two fighters left, and whichever fighter's kill meter fills up first wins, triggering a final, character-specific death animation.

Players can choose from four different modes. "Arcade Mode" puts players through eight stages against computer-controlled opponents, the first six of which are four-player matches, while the latter two are one-on-one battles against the characters Judas and Marukka, respectively. "Versus Mode" allows players to fight with up to three other players or computer-controlled fighters. In order to play with all four players, players required the PlayStation Multitap. "Team Mode" splits players into two teams, with each team sharing a single kill meter. "Training Mode" is a single-player mode which allows players to test individual characters' moves on a computer opponent; performing each move in a character's moveset in this mode unlocks a fifth costume for the character. Stages include Dante's Cage, the Crematorium, Sacrificial Ruins, Chamber of Anguish, the Lavatory, Insane Asylum, Slaughterhouse of Flesh, Sewer of Styx, Sinner's Cell, and Homicide Avenue.

== Characters ==
The eight original playable characters (from left to right): Tormentor, The Imp, Belladonna, Mammoth, Violet, Cleetus, Dr. Faustus, and Oddball

In the story of Thrill Kill, Marukka decides out of boredom to gather ten people who have been sent to Hell for their sins to fight to the death for a chance at being reincarnated. There are eleven playable characters:

- Belladonna Marie Cocherto / Belladonna: A librarian who became a dominatrix and killed both her husband and sister after discovering that they were having an affair. She died after electrocuting herself with a cattle prod. She now uses this prod to fight and has sexually suggestive moves.
- Cain: An arsonist who got trapped inside a building he set on fire and was burned alive. His attacks have the widest reach in the game and he can also shoot fire out of his backside.
- Cleetus T. Radley / Cleetus: A cannibal who sold "homestyle" sausages made from human remains, and died due to a tapeworm infection from one of his victims. He fights using a bloody, detached leg, and can also bite his opponents.
- Gabriel Faustus / Dr. Faustus: A plastic surgeon who killed and purposely disfigured his patients and died from infection after affixing a bear trap to his face. His weapon is a scalpel and he also attacks using his metal mouth.
- Billy B. Tattoo / The Imp: A dwarf "leather daddy" with a hatred for tall people, who died after amputating his legs and sticking stilts in them. Unlike the rest of the characters (excluding Judas), The Imp is not revealed to have killed anyone during his time on Earth. He uses his stilts as weapons. Some members of Paradox's team resented Thrill Kill producer Harvard Bonin for attempting to change the game to give it a different ESRB rating, and modeled The Imp after Bonin as a jab at him.
- Judas: A pair of conjoined twins connected at the torso. It is never explained how Judas ended up in Hell. While one twin acts as the upper half, the other twin acts as the lower half, using their arms to hold them up.
- Franklin Peppermint / Mammoth: A postal employee who "went postal" after getting fired. He committed suicide afterward by shooting himself. He resembles a large, skinless gorilla and fights with his fists.
- Marukka: A demon and the "Goddess of Secrets" who gathers the other fighters to brawl for a chance at being reincarnated. While fighting, she can teleport.
- Raymond Raystack / Oddball: An FBI behavioral analyst who became a serial killer. He died after being gunned down by his protégé. He still wears a straitjacket in Hell and cannot use his arms, so he primarily uses kicks and headbutts to attack, and can also use breakdancing to fight.
- William J. Whitefield / Tormentor: A judge who would acquit criminals in order to kidnap and torture them later, and was eventually executed for his crimes. His outfit is bondage-themed, and he fights using a heated whip.
- Violet Boregard / Violet: A circus contortionist who developed a strong hatred for men after being raped by one who broke into her dressing room, whom she later killed. She died of a spinal cord rupture. She uses her contortion skills to fight opponents.

A twelfth non-player character, The Gimp, inspired by "the gimp" from the 1994 film Pulp Fiction, can be unlocked as an opponent in Training Mode.

== Development and cancellation ==
In the late 1990s, Paradox Development began development on a PlayStation game titled Earth Monster, a fantasy sports game based on the Mesoamerican ballgame where players would control large, muscular Aztec warriors who punched and kicked one another while trying to get a ball into a hoop. The game's publisher, Virgin Interactive, repeatedly encouraged the developers to make the fighting aspect more violent, before eventually deciding to turn the project entirely into a fighting game. Its Aztec aesthetic was soon replaced by one inspired by BDSM and intended by Virgin to cause controversy, which they hoped would help it sell better. Harvard Bonin, the producer assigned to Thrill Kill, showed developers fetish magazines, such as Skin Two, and BDSM DVDs as references for the desired art direction. The game was originally announced under the title S&M.

Designed as an especially violent, "full-blown adult" fighting game and the first four-player 3D fighting game, Thrill Kill was meant to compare to the similarly violent Mortal Kombat series. Paradox hoped that the game's success would help the studio earn mainstream recognition. The plot of Thrill Kill, based around each of the characters fighting for a chance at resurrection after being sent to Hell, was written by the game's assistant producer, Brian Gomez, and inspired by the musical Cats. Moves were given names such as "Bitch Slap", "Swallow This", "Crotch Crush", and "Miner 69er", and several were designed to resemble sexual acts. According to Bonin, the kill meter system was designed to "promote in-your-face aggression" to contrast Thrill Kill from other fighting games that encouraged players to focus on defending their own character. After E3 1998, where Thrill Kill was nominated as the most popular game presented at the event, it gained a large following due to its gory and sexual nature. It received one of the first "Adults Only" (AO) ratings from the Entertainment Software Rating Board (ESRB) after it was submitted, and became the first game to receive the rating solely due to violence as opposed to the rating usually being only given to games with strong sexual/pornographic content. As of 2021, only two other games (Manhunt 2 and Hatred) ever received an AO rating solely for extreme, graphic violence. This prompted Virgin and Bonin to try and get developers to tone down the game's content to get it to a "Mature" (M) rating, as an AO rating would prevent it from being sold in many stores.

Thrill Kill was originally set to be released in October 1998. One strategy proposed by Virgin to promote it was to send copies to those opposed to video game violence. In August 1998, the North American operations of Virgin Interactive were acquired by Electronic Arts as part of their purchase of Westwood Studios, which led to EA gaining the publishing rights to Thrill Kill. After evaluating the game, EA's executive board deemed its tone too violent for publication. By this point, according to senior programmer David Ollman, the game was already 99% finished and a sequel had been proposed, the name of which would have either been F.U.B.A.R or S&M. Two weeks after acquiring Virgin, the company discontinued the game and declined offers to sell it to other publishers, including Eidos Interactive. According to Louis Castle, founder of Westwood Studios, "EA...was working hard to overcome the industry stigma of games as a more violent medium than film or TV." Members of Thrill Kill's development team were not directly informed by EA that the game was cancelled and instead found out by reading articles about it on the Internet, according to producer Kevin Mulhall. In later interviews, Paradox employees such as Mulhall and Ollman pointed to EA's connections with United States Senator Joe Lieberman, who was staunchly and vocally opposed to video game violence, as an explanation for EA's decision to cancel the game.

Although it was never made available for retail purchase, bootleg versions of the game were uploaded to pirating websites by its developers, and it became one of the most popular and frequently downloaded ROMs on the Internet. Thrill Kill was later reskinned by Paradox and used to make the 1999 PlayStation fighting game Wu-Tang: Shaolin Style, published by Activision and based on the rap group Wu-Tang Clan. The Thrill Kill engine later became a core technology for Paradox, and was used in two-player form for the 2000 game X-Men: Mutant Academy, its 2001 sequel X-Men: Mutant Academy 2, and the 2000 game Rock 'Em Sock 'Em Robots Arena.

== Reception and legacy ==
In a review of the beta version of Thrill Kill, Gamers' Republic's Mike Griffin wrote, "[Thrill Kill is] perfect for mindless fun with friends and cold drinks. Mindless, but not brainless. There should be enough depth to the gameplay to satisfy hard-core 3D fighting fans once Paradox has completed its final few months of dedicated beta tweaking." Griffin also stated, "There are a few bugs right now that prevent Thrill Kill from being completely effective." Also reviewing the game's beta version, IGN's Jeff Chen wrote, "The action at this point is somewhat stiff, but it's still early, and if you're looking for blood and guts, this has got more than we'd ever imagined. We can't wait."

In their September 2004 issue, Official U.S. PlayStation Magazine cited Thrill Kill as one of the most overrated cancelled games, stating, "It got lots of hype. But it really sucked, too." In 2011, GamePro ranked The Imp fourteenth on a list of "The 50 Best Fighting Game Characters Ever". In 2014, Metro included Thrill Kill on their list of the most offensive games of all time, while Complex named Thrill Kill the seventh most violent video game. IGN named Thrill Kill on their list of the biggest unreleased games.

Steven T. Wright of Variety considered Thrill Kill "perhaps the most notorious unreleased game in the history of the industry", while, in 2012, IGN wrote that it was "perhaps the most famous cancelled game in recent memory". In a 2013 article for The Manitoban, Marc Lagace called the game "a complete disaster, both aesthetically and gameplay-wise" and "perhaps the most controversial game that never was". Writing for Kotaku Australia, Leah Williams wrote, "To look at it now, it all seems a bit naff — but way back in 1998, the content of Thrill Kill was extremely controversial." Den of Geek's Gavin Jasper called Thrill Kill, Tattoo Assassins, and Primal Rage 2 the "holy trinity of almost-to-completely-finished fighting games that didn't get released".

== See also ==
- List of cancelled PlayStation video games
- List of controversial video games
- List of fighting games
