= TNA Impact!: Cross The Line =

2010 video game

- North American PSP cover art featuring from left to right AJ Styles, Kurt Angle, and Sting
- Developers: Midway Studios Los Angeles; Point of View, Inc. (PSP); DoubleTap Games (DS)
- Publisher: SouthPeak Games
- Director: Sal DiVita
- Designer: Mark Turmell
- Programmer: Brock Feldman
- Artist: Paul Interrante
- Composer: Dale Oliver
- Platforms: PlayStation Portable; Nintendo DS
- Release: EU: June 18, 2010 (PSP); NA: June 29, 2010
- Genre: Sports
- Mode: Single-player

TNA Impact!: Cross The Line (stylized as TNA iMPACT!: Cross The Line) is a professional wrestling video game for the PlayStation Portable (PSP) and Nintendo DS consoles, published by SouthPeak Games in June 2010. The game was previously in development under publisher Midway Games.

The game is a port of TNA Impact!, a console game that was released in September 2008, developed by Midway Studios Los Angeles. The PSP version is developed by Point of View, Inc. who provided additional development to the console counterpart. The Nintendo DS version is developed by DoubleTap Games, and features a different story mode to the console and PSP versions, alongside updated attires and unique menu screens.

== Development ==
In November 2009, SouthPeak Games acquired Midway Games' TNA video game license, certain TNA video game assets, and existing contracts with Point of View and DoubleTap Games for handheld ports. In June 2010, the company published TNA Impact!: Cross the Line for PlayStation Portable (PSP) and Nintendo DS.

Both the PSP and Nintendo DS versions feature Mick Foley and Consequences Creed, who did not appear in the original TNA console game.

The PSP version features Mike Tenay and Petey Williams who were previously only available as DLC on the Xbox Live Marketplace, as well as Don West and Afro Thunder, who were unlockable wrestlers only on the PS3 and Xbox 360 versions. Senshi, Christian Cage, Christopher Daniels and Curry Man (previous DLC) were not included on the PSP version due to their TNA departures.

Hulk Hogan made his TNA video game debut in the Nintendo DS version, alongside the inclusion of Curry Man, despite his removal from the PSP version. The Steel Cage match is also exclusive to the Nintendo DS version, not appearing on the consoles or PSP versions. Several wrestlers from the console and PSP versions are not included on the Nintendo DS version.

== Reception ==
Reception

Aggregate score
Aggregator	Score
Metacritic	50/100

Review scores
Publication	Score
GamesMaster	35%
GameSpot	5/10
GamesRadar+	2/5
GameZone	5.5/10
Play	58%
PlayStation: The Official Magazine	3/5

The PSP version received "mixed or average" reviews, according to the review aggregation website Metacritic. GameSpot was critical of the game's controls. Some magazines gave mixed to unfavorable reviews months before the game was released Stateside.

== See also ==
- List of professional wrestling video games
