= Cheesy (video game) =

- European cover art
- Developer: CTA Developments
- Publishers: EU: Ocean Software; JP: Jaleco
- Producer: Gina Jackson
- Designer: Richard Cheek
- Programmer: John Scott
- Composers: Dave Newman; James Veal
- Platform: PlayStation
- Release: EU: October 25, 1996; JP: July 24, 1997
- Genre: Platform
- Mode: Single-player

Cheesy is a 1996 platform game developed by British studio CTA Developments and published by Ocean Software in Europe and by Jaleco in Japan for the PlayStation. The game follows an anthropomorphic mouse of the same name, who's captured by Doctor Chem, a mad scientist who wants to experiment on him, at Rock Castle. After being unintentionally freed from his cage by aliens and a UFO, the rodent sets out to escape. The game's goal is to collect ingredients for a teleportation spell to escape the castle, by navigating it, battling against monsters and all sorts of creatures that will come in his way.

Initially, Cheesy was developed for the Atari Jaguar, as one of the system's upcoming titles. The project was moved to the PlayStation, due to several factors relating to the difficulty of developing on Atari's console and its failure both commercially and critically, along with a false advertisement of being a powerful 64-bit console. The game received negative reviews from critics, cited for its poor controls, graphics, and inconsistent game design, but the music was praised.

== Gameplay ==
Gameplay of the first level in Cheesy, where a titular character must navigate through the shelves.

In Cheesy the player controls a mouse, who was captured and imprisoned by a mad scientist inside a dark castle. The main objective of the game is to escape from the castle by collecting ingredients for a special teleportation spell while battling against aliens and all sorts of creatures in Cheesy's way.

Throughout the game, the player may find power-ups in the level that can help him along the way. Cheesy's head grants the player an extra life and a heart grants extra health. Mini-UFOs with the word "SAFE" will give checkpoints, where the player will start a level from that point if they lose a life. Cheese pieces will give an extra continue if 100 of them are collected. The game's plot and events are presented through animated FMV cutscenes. They can be turned off in the options menu.

== Plot ==
Two days before the events of the game, a mad scientist named Doctor Chem caught the mouse named Cheesy, who was thrown into a cage. Since then, the mouse has lain in the cage, tired; he hears about a special teleportation spell along with its mystic ingredients. Eventually, when Cheesy was about to get to sleep, suddenly an alien with a UFO appeared for its "secret mission". Shortly after its appearance, the cage had shaken, and Cheesy had been freed as a result of the conflict between the alien and the UFO.

After Cheesy was freed, he witnessed the aftermath of a battle between the alien and the UFO, where the alien lost and dropped his robotic arm gun that shoots laser beams. Cheesy picks it up and begins a scavenger hunt for ingredients after he finds a book of spells. Once he finds them all, he throws them into the pot. Cheesy jumps into it to find that after being teleported and landing, the floor is filled with mousetraps around him activating one after another, presumably killing the rodent.

== Development and release ==
Cheesy was developed by British studio CTA Developments. Gina Jackson served as a producer, John Scott was a programmer, Richard Cheek was a graphic and game designer, and Steve Cowell as a sound designer. The music was done by Zero-5 composers Dave Newman and James Veal, while Ocean Software designed its manual and provided the playtesting. Cheesy was the last game to be developed by CTA Developments, as the studio was disbanded a few months after the release of the game. Many members, including both founders, have moved on to other projects.

Originally the game started as a project intended for the Atari Jaguar, which was first announced in May 1994 as one of the upcoming titles for the Jaguar by Ocean Software and was originally scheduled to be released around the fourth quarter of 1995, but the game was moved to the PlayStation, due to several reasons, including a commercial and critical failure, as well as false advertisement of being a powerful 64-bit console and the system's limitation. The game was first showcased to the public at various trade shows such as E3 1996. It was released in Europe by Ocean on 25 October 1996, and in Japan by Jaleco on 24 July 1997.

== Reception ==
Reception

Review scores
| Publication | Score |
|---|---|
| Consoles + | 85% |
| Joypad | 84% |
| Mega Fun | 42% |
| Player One | 75% |
| Video Games (DE) | 35% |
| Dengeki PlayStation | 45/100, 60/100 |

Cheesy received mixed to negative reviews from critics since its release. The game was cited for its controls, graphics and inconsistent game design, but the soundtrack received praise.

In a retrospective review of The Boar Reece Goodall, criticized the game's controls as "both sluggish and over-responsive in equal measure" comparing it to Super Mario 64. Along with constant game mode shifting design of the game shifts from 2D to 3D style, alongside its "claustrophobic level design". Critic has also panned the game's depressing atmosphere that matches with soundtrack, thinking "Presumably the developers weren’t aiming for such a bleak atmosphere".
