= Shockwave Assault =

1994 video game

- Developers: Advanced Technology Group; Paradox Development (Windows and Saturn)
- Publisher: Electronic Arts
- Director: Kelly Pope
- Producer: Stewart J. Bonn
- Designer: Michael Becker
- Artists: Bob Rossman; David Pettigrew; Don Woo
- Composers: Tony Berkeley; Marc Farly; Don Veca
- Platforms: 3DO, Windows, Mac OS, PlayStation, Apple Bandai Pippin, Saturn
- Release: 3DO: NA: June 27, 1994; EU: 1994; Operation Jumpgate: NA: May 19, 1995; EU: 1995; Windows, Mac, PlayStation: NA: December 15, 1995; EU: February 1996; Apple Bandai Pippin: JP: 1996; Saturn: NA: June 26, 1996; EU: July 5, 1996
- Genre: Combat flight simulation
- Mode: Single-player

Shockwave Assault (originally released as Shock Wave on the 3DO) is a science fiction combat flight simulation video game developed by Advanced Technology Group and published by Electronic Arts for various home video game consoles and PCs. The player takes control of a futuristic fighter plane to defeat extraterrestrial ships and tripods.

Shock Wave was a pack-in game for the Goldstar 3DO. A sequel was released in 1995 for the 3DO and Mac called Shock Wave 2: Beyond the Gate.

== Plot ==
The game is set in 2019. In a surprise attack, aliens decimate Earth's military forces. Mankind's only hope is the surviving orbital space carrier UNSF Omaha and its squadron of F-177 pilots. As the young and inexperienced member of the squadron, it is the protagonist's job to drive the aliens from the planet.

The player's character, a rookie named Lieutenant J. "Wildcard" Adair, destroys the attacking aliens in various locations around the world, rescues a downed ally, retrieves oxygen supplies for the Omaha, and ultimately attacks the brain of the alien mothership with the assistance of an onboard AI named ICE. Aboard the Omaha, Commander Crane and Major Alaina Stewart interact with the vessel's fighter pilots and crew, most prominently Dr. Lawrence as he uncovers that they are actually fighting robotic vessels harvesting humans and incubating eggs, with the true alien invasion yet to come. If the player's fighter is destroyed in a mission, the doctor patches Wildcard up before Stewart sends them out again to retry the mission. Upon exhausting all of a player's lives, Wildcard flatlines.

The "Operation Jumpgate" expansion is set in 2026. Stewart has assumed command of the Omaha on an expedition through Earth's solar system fighting aliens on Mars, the moons of Jupiter and Saturn, and an asteroid leading to the alien jumpgate. Wildcard, Stewart and ICE are the only returning characters aside from some reused footage. At the conclusion of the final mission, Stewart grows impatient waiting for a science team to arrive at the jumpgate and attempts to destroy it, resulting in the heavily damaged Omaha drifting into the jumpgate and disappearing.

== Gameplay ==
Most of Shockwave Assault takes place in the cockpit of a fictional F-177 fighter, which resembles the Lockheed F-117 Nighthawk but is capable of spaceflight. The fighter is armed with a rapid fire laser which consumes energy and a limited number of homing missiles. The ship automatically levels off when it stops turning. The thrusters consume fuel, but give the ship a useful burst of speed. The shield is depleted as the ship runs into things or is hit by enemy fire. Each of these resources can be replenished by flying under the refueling drones that are located at fixed locations in each mission. The ship automatically hovers over the terrain, making it impossible to crash.

The player must fight through 15 missions (10 in the 3DO version), each with a boss at the end. The levels take place at various places around the Earth, and the terrain is modeled appropriately (Egypt has desert terrain, Peru has jungles, etc.). At the start of each mission the player is briefed on what to expect, and throughout the level, the onboard computer gives additional information that changes depending on the player's performance.

== Release ==
The game originally released as Shock Wave on the 3DO in 1994 and received an expansion, Shock Wave: Operation Jumpgate in 1995. Playing the expansion required a save file from the original Shock Wave to be in the 3DO's memory. All later versions of the game (Windows, Mac OS, PlayStation, Saturn, and Apple Pippin) include the original content and the expansion pack in the same release under the title Shockwave Assault. The Apple Pippin version was released only in North America.

The Windows version was the first Electronic Arts game specifically designed to utilize the enhancements of the Windows 95 operating system. Project director Phillippe Tarbouriech explained, "Many of the 3D effects in Shockwave Assault would not have been possible under MS-DOS or Windows 3.1. In addition, Win 95 allows the PC to play streaming video for the first time."

In June 1995, Atari Corporation realized a deal with EA to bring select titles to the Atari Jaguar CD, with Shock Wave being among them. This port was never released due to the commercial and critical failure of the Atari Jaguar platform.

== Reception ==
Reception

Review scores
Publication	Score
Electronic Gaming Monthly	7.75/10 (3DO); 4.375/10 (SAT)
Next Generation	2/5 (3DO, PS1, SAT); 3/5 (MAC)
Play	87% (PS1)
Sega Saturn Magazine	55% (SAT)
3DO Magazine	3/5 (3DO)

The original 3DO release received mixed reviews. The four reviewers of Electronic Gaming Monthly criticized the over-sensitive controls but praised the texture-mapped graphics and off-rails gameplay. They made particular note of the game's use of full motion video, saying that in sharp contrast to previous FMV-heavy games, the quality was sharp, the acting was good, and the overall use of FMV was "more of an addition to the game instead of the whole emphasis." GamePro was more critical, stating that FMVs would preempt the HUD display even in situations where the radar is needed, and the inability to alter altitude makes it feel "like you're flying in a box." However, the reviewer agreed that the texture-mapped graphics and FMV cutscenes are impressive, and concluded, "Shock Wave's tough adversaries and first-rate graphics make it a decent 3DO shooter." Next Generation reviewed the 3DO version of the game, and stated that "If you own a 3DO unit and you've been just dying for a no-frills shooting game, then it's OK. But anyone with greater expectations will be disappointed."

GamePro praised the game's length and the PlayStation version's new and improved animations, summarizing it as "one very cool shooter". A Next Generation critic said that while it runs noticeably smoother than the 3DO original and has the added bonus of the Operation Jumpgate expansion, "it's still pretty boring, at least right up until the point where it becomes utterly too difficult to get any farther." He elaborated that despite the 15 levels using different textures and theoretically being based on aerial photographs, they all look and play much the same. He did, however, praise the way the game runs full motion video alongside real time gameplay. A review of the Macintosh version in the same issue made the same criticisms about the sameness of the levels and none of the same praises, summarizing the game as "the perfect title for those who don't mind brainless action patterns over and over." Despite this, it was given a higher score than the PlayStation version.

Unlike the earlier releases, the Saturn version received resoundingly negative reviews. The four reviewers of Electronic Gaming Monthly praised the storyline, full motion video, and lengthy content, but said the gameplay is repetitive and frustrating, since the limited controls make it unfairly difficult to avoid taking hits. Sega Saturn Magazine's Rob Bright agreed that though each level has different objectives, the gameplay nonetheless boils down to repetitive wandering and simplistic firefights. He also argued that the storyline is simplistic, and the full motion video sequences which deliver it are "hugely naff". Next Generation deemed it "antiquated and repetitious" in a brief review.

Next Generation reviewed Shock Wave: Operation JumpGate, rating it three stars out of five, and stated that "The follow-up isn't as complete as the original, but is twice as challenging. It's sure to be more than satisfying to fans of the game."

== Sequel ==
The game received a 3DO-exclusive sequel, Shock Wave 2: Beyond the Gate, published by Electronic Arts. Publishing rights for the sequel were later sold to Aztech New Media Corp. and a Macintosh port made in 1996 but not released due to low sales for the 3DO. The Mac version was eventually released in 1998 as part of their Mac Pack Blitz compilation.
