= TNA Impact! (video game) =

2008 video game

- NTSC Cover art featuring (clockwise from middle) Kurt Angle, Samoa Joe, Booker T, AJ Styles, and Sting
- Developers: Midway Studios Los Angeles; Point of View (PS2)
- Publisher: Midway Games
- Director: Sal DiVita
- Designer: Mark Turmell
- Programmer: Brock Feldman
- Artist: Paul Interrante
- Composer: Dale Oliver
- Engine: Unreal Engine 3 (PS3/Xbox 360)
- Platforms: PlayStation 2; PlayStation 3; Xbox 360; Wii
- Release: PlayStation 2, PlayStation 3, Xbox 360: NA: September 9, 2008; PAL: September 12, 2008; Wii: NA: September 16, 2008; PAL: October 3, 2008
- Genre: Sports
- Modes: Single-player, multiplayer

TNA Impact! (stylized as TNA iMPACT!) is a professional wrestling video game based on the Total Nonstop Action Wrestling promotion, developed by Midway Studios Los Angeles, and published by Midway Games in September 2008.

Although the game sold 1.5 million units, financial issues at Midway Games prevented the planned development and release of a sequel.

The game was ported to Nintendo DS and PlayStation Portable (PSP) handset consoles in June 2010 by SouthPeak Games under the title TNA Impact!: Cross The Line.

== Gameplay ==
Jeff Jarrett drops an elbow on Sting.

TNA Impact! is geared towards a quick-paced, high-impact style of play, with lower emphasis on submission maneuvers. It supports up to four players at once, with online capabilities (which includes tournaments) standing at one-on-one. However, online play is restricted to the PlayStation 3 and Xbox 360 versions. Scans of the wrestlers were used in place of hand-painted textures to include small details, like skin texture and scars. Finishers are accessed by building up the "Impact!" meter. There is also a damage indicator that shows the condition of wrestlers. The game also features minigames for escaping pin attempts and submissions.

TNA's signature match, Ultimate X, is a playable match type, alongside the more standard Singles, Tag team and Fatal Four Way matches. Submission and Falls Count Anywhere matches are also included. Eight different venues—including TNA's main home: Florida's Impact! Zone, and arenas set in Japan, Mexico, England, Las Vegas, and locations designed to evoke the independent circuit feel—are available to house matches, with the Impact! Zone having an increased ringside area and hot spots for player interaction. Liverpool Olympia is also a playable arena.

The story mode's main character is a wrestler named Suicide. During every iMPACT! episode after the August 2008 version, the words "whoissuicide.com" flashed on the screen for less than a second. On the website, it shows Suicide is being taken from the game to real life television. At the Final Resolution pay-per-view in December 2008, Suicide first appeared on TNA programming. At Destination X 2009, Suicide participated in his debut match in TNA, which was an Ultimate X match, and then became the new X Division Champion.

== Development ==
After various negotiations with Electronic Arts and Rockstar Games, TNA signed a multi-year agreement with Midway Games in November 2005. Midway announced their intentions to release Impact!, the first game in TNA's history, for each of the seventh generation consoles, which were released in 2008.

Several TNA wrestlers were involved in the production. The self described "hardcore gamers" Samoa Joe and A.J. Styles both participated in meetings with Midway staff to brainstorm gameplay ideas, and Joe, Styles, Christopher Daniels, Senshi, Sonjay Dutt, and Jeff Jarrett were all a part of the motion capture sessions. During the October 2006 tapings of the weekly TNA Impact! program, members of the TNA roster were "scanned" for the game, and audio samples of the Impact! Zone crowd were recorded. The Liverpool Olympia was used for reference photos to inspire the unlockable 'London' venue in the game.

== Other features ==
Classic TNA highlight matches were featured in the video game as TNA Extras, with two matches being filmed as Midway Games exclusive matches. These matches were a Knockouts Gauntlet Match and a Six Way X Division Match.

=== Downloadable content (DLC) ===
Midway introduced downloadable content which enabled the player to expand the game, making TNA Impact! the first professional wrestling video game in history to offer this service.

The first downloadable content was in the form of new wrestlers that the player could add to the game, these being Curry Man and Petey Williams. These were bought for 100 Microsoft points from the Xbox Live Marketplace, and as an extra gift, the player could download Mike Tenay for free. This feature was only available for Xbox 360 and started on November 6, 2008, but the content was initially glitched and made Curry Man emerge as Christopher Daniels in his entrance and Petey Williams emerge as A.J. Styles and have the model of Senshi in the ring. These glitches were later fixed.

Don West and Afro Thunder were also exclusive to the PlayStation 3 and Xbox 360 versions through style points.

== Reception ==
Reception

Aggregate scores
Aggregator	Score			
Aggregator	PS2	PS3	Wii	Xbox 360
GameRankings	63.17%	63.33%	44.43%	64.73%
Metacritic	58/100	64/100	43/100	62/100

Review scores
Publication	Score			
Publication	PS2	PS3	Wii	Xbox 360
Eurogamer	N/A	N/A	N/A	7/10
Game Informer	N/A	6.5/10	N/A	6.5/10
GamePro	N/A	N/A	N/A	2.5/5
GameRevolution	N/A	N/A	N/A	C+
GameSpot	6/10	7/10	N/A	7/10
GameSpy	3/5	3/5	3/5	3/5
GameTrailers	N/A	6.6/10	N/A	N/A
GameZone	N/A	6.5/10	N/A	6.5/10
Giant Bomb	N/A	N/A	N/A	3/5
IGN	5.3/10	6.4/10	4.5/10	6.7/10
Nintendo Power	N/A	N/A	5/10	N/A
Official Xbox Magazine (US)	N/A	N/A	N/A	7/10
PlayStation: The Official Magazine	N/A	2.5/5	N/A	N/A
411Mania	(1) 6.2/10 (2) 4.5/10	4.9/10	N/A	6.9/10
The A.V. Club	N/A	N/A	N/A	C+

TNA Impact! received "mixed or average" reviews, while the Wii version received "generally unfavorable" reviews, according to review aggregator Metacritic.

The game was praised for its realistic graphics and simple control scheme, but criticized for its limited and repetitive movesets, poor entrances, lack of championship belts, and inconsistent AI. GameSpot was generally positive to the PlayStation 3, Xbox 360, and PlayStation 2 versions.

As of February 2009, TNA iMPACT! had shipped approximately 1.5 million units.

== Mobile tie-in ==
In 2008, Longtail Studios created the game TNA Wrestling for Verizon Wireless mobile devices to coincide with this release. The game was re-released in 2009 for iOS.

In 2011, Namco Networks released TNA Wrestling Impact! for mobile devices.

== Cancelled sequel ==
Midway Games originally announced a sequel, but it was later cancelled after Midway Games filed for bankruptcy in February 2009. In July 2009, Time Warner (through its subsidiary Warner Bros. Interactive Entertainment) purchased the majority of Midway. The TNA license was not included with the purchase. Later in September, TNA president Dixie Carter said that TNA was looking for a new video game partner. In November, SouthPeak Games acquired Midway Games' TNA video game license in its quarterly report. The company later published TNA Impact!: Cross the Line for Nintendo DS and PSP, releasing it in June 2010. The game was basically the same as the 2008 release, with the addition of several new characters and the removal of older ones, such as Christian Cage who departed TNA in 2008.

== See also ==
- List of licensed wrestling video games
