= Hatred (video game) =

2015 video game

- Box art depicting "The Antagonist"
- Developer: Destructive Creations
- Publisher: Destructive Creations
- Director: Jarosław Zieliński
- Designers: Jakub Stychno; Arkadiusz Filip
- Programmers: Piotr Bąk; Tomasz Widenka
- Writer: Herr Warcrimer
- Composer: Adam Skorupa
- Engine: Unreal Engine 4
- Platforms: Windows, Linux
- Release: June 1, 2015
- Genre: Shoot 'em up
- Mode: Single-player

Hatred is an isometric shoot 'em up video game developed and published by Destructive Creations that was released on June 1, 2015, for Microsoft Windows. The character the player uses in the game is a misanthropic mass-killer referred to as "The Antagonist" or "Not Important", who begins a "genocide crusade" to kill as many human beings as possible. The developer described Hatred as a reaction to video game aesthetic trends such as political correctness, politeness, vivid color, and video games as art. Its October 2014 announcement trailer was characterized as "controversial" by multiple video game journalists. The game was shortly removed by Valve from their Steam Greenlight service due to its extremely violent content but was later brought back with a personal apology from Gabe Newell. It was greenlit for a second time on December 29, 2014, and released on June 1, 2015.

Upon release, Hatred received generally negative reviews in video game press. Critics panned the game for being repetitive and lacking variation, criticizing its violent and controversial nature, although some minor praise went towards its gameplay mechanics.

== Gameplay ==
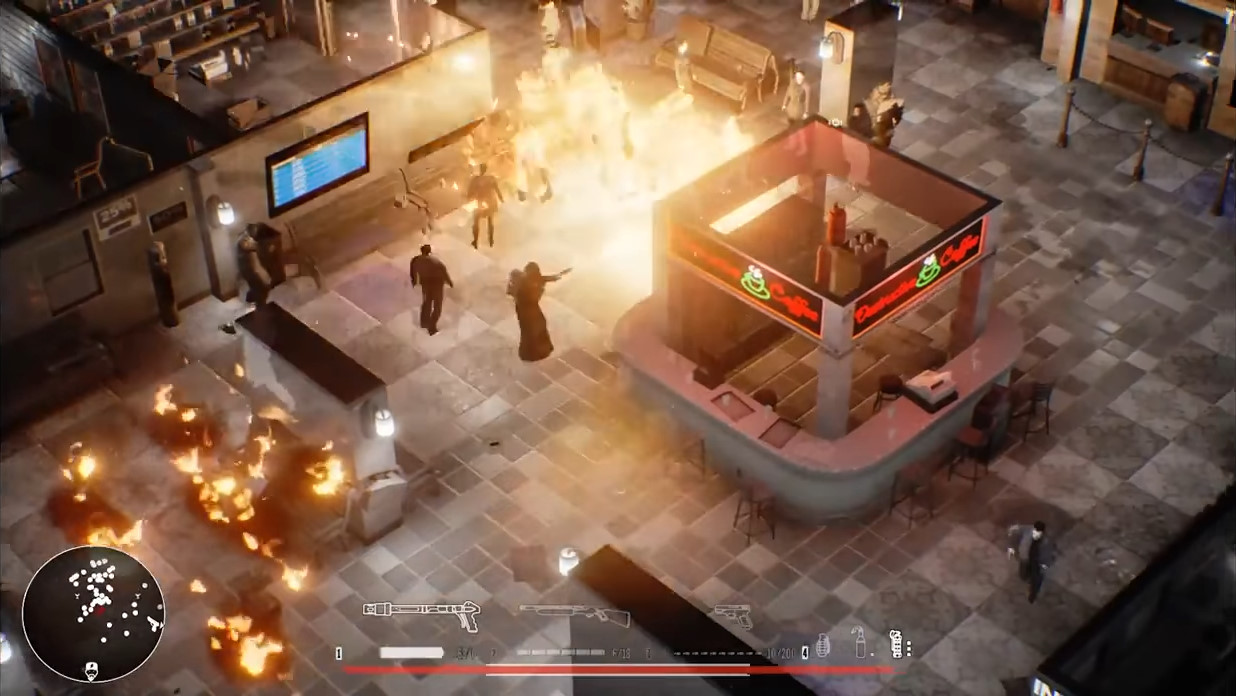
"The Antagonist" (center on screenshot) engaging a massacre with a flamethrower. The game's interiors can be explored and destroyed.

Hatred is a shooter game presented in an isometric perspective in which the player character and protagonist is a mass-murdering villain who "hates this world, and the human worms feasting on its carcass" and embarks on a "genocide crusade" against the entire human race. The player can carry three weapons and an assortment of grenades, as well as drive some vehicles. Health is regenerated by performing executions on incapacitated people; the moves made to kill those victims often involve cinematic switches of camera perspectives, but can also be a "safe execution" (which can be toggled to occur every time instead) where The Antagonist simply points his firearm down and shoots the victim akin to the original Postal and its Redux.

If the character is killed, the level restarts entirely unless the player has completed additional sidequests that provide a limited number of respawn points. The character's voice acting is deliberately kept to a minimum, with his ideology and motivations largely left open to interpretation.

== Plot ==
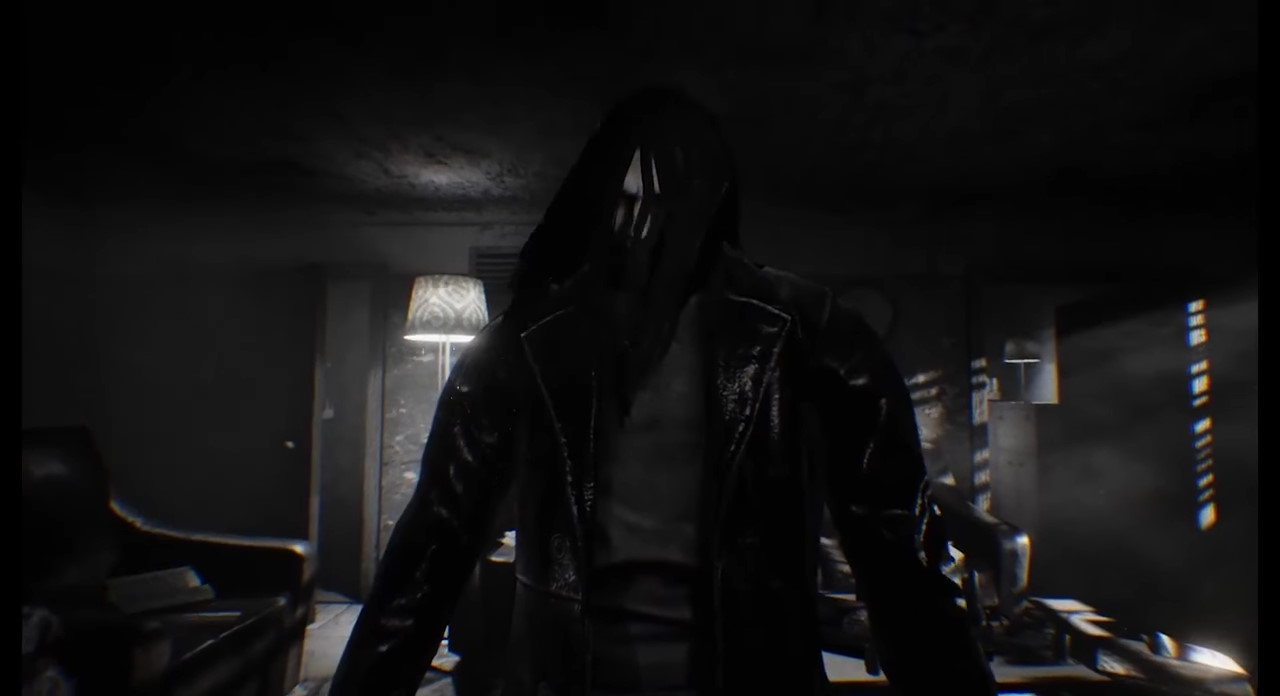
The Antagonist, also known as "Not Important"

The plot of Hatred revolves around a man only known as "Not Important". Disgusted by human society and general existence, Not Important decides to commit a "one-way trip" spree of killings in New York City using his arsenal of weapons.

Travelling from his neighborhood to 1 Police Plaza, Not Important kills dozens of civilians and NYPD officers, prompting a government response. After escaping the police by train, he devises a plan to carry out his mission of committing suicide and killing millions of people by blowing up a nuclear power plant near the city. To accomplish this, he needs a Composition C plastic explosive, which he gets by storming the Fort O'Connor military base, wiping out the entire base before heading to the power plant.

He manages to enter the nuclear power plant and plants the explosive on the nuclear reactor. He then attempts to overload the nuclear reactor using the security system. Whether he succeeds or fails, soldiers arrive and shoot him multiple times in the chest while he laughs. As he dies, he activates the explosive trigger; the power plant explodes, levelling New York City and killing millions of people.

== Development ==
My name is not important. What is important is what I'm going to do. I just fucking hate this world and the human worms feasting on its carcass. My whole life is just cold, bitter hatred and I always wanted to die violently. This is the time of vengeance and no life is worth saving. And I will put in the grave as many as I can. It's time for me to kill and it's time for me to die. My genocide crusade begins here.

— "The Antagonist", in Hatred announcement trailer, October 2014

Hatred is the first game by Destructive Creations, a video game developer based in Gliwice, Poland. Most of the company's staff previously worked at another Polish developer, The Farm 51.

Destructive Creations announced Hatred on October 16, 2014, releasing the game's controversial trailer. The developer described Hatred as a reaction to a trend of political correctness in video games, and sought to make a game that eschewed politeness, colorfulness, and games as art. In this way, they sought to make a game that recalled the industry's history as "a rebellious medium" and surface-level entertainment with no insertion of "any fake philosophy". While the trailer was intended to be provocative, Destructive Creations CEO Jarosław Zieliński did not anticipate the large reaction and the amount of supportive fan mail. He added that he did not think the trailer crossed a moral boundary, and that those who disagreed could choose to not play it. In an interview with Vice's Motherboard, Zieliński noted that the dark ambient music within the game as well as the character design were intentionally made to be devoid of joy, stating that "I don't want to justify anything. I want the player to ask: why." The game uses the Unreal Engine 4 game engine and Nvidia PhysX physics. The Unreal logo was removed from the trailer at the request of the engine's developer, Epic Games.

The player character's dialogue was written by Herr Warcrimer, vocalist for Polish black metal band Infernal War and industrial blackened death metal band Iperyt; the song "Particular Hatred" by Iperyt appears in the game. The voice for the player character was provided by a voice-over actor using the pseudonym "Clint Westwood"; Zieliński claimed the actor "wanted to stay anonymous". Instrumental songs from Norwegian death metal band Blood Red Throne also appear in the soundtrack.

The team chose to work on a single platform due to the team's small size, hoping to distribute the game through Steam and GOG.com if allowed. On December 15, 2014, Hatred briefly appeared on Steam Greenlight, but was removed, with a Steam representative stating that the company "would not publish Hatred". On December 16, the game was returned to the service, and an apology to the development team was sent by Gabe Newell. Following this, it became the most voted game on the service and was approved successfully on December 29.

On April 11, 2020, Destructive Creations announced that they would be porting the game to the Nintendo Switch. It was unclear whether the game will be released in its uncensored form as Nintendo, like Sony and Microsoft, has a policy of not licensing or selling AO-rated games for its video game systems. As of 2026, this port of the game has not released.

=== Marketing ===
In January 2015, Hatred was given an "Adults Only" (AO) rating by the Entertainment Software Rating Board (ESRB). The rating effectively prevents any mainstream retail distribution of the game in the United States, or on video game consoles as all three major console manufacturers forbid AO-rated games on their platforms. It is the third video game that received an AO rating for extreme violence rather than sexual content, behind Manhunt 2 and the unreleased Thrill Kill. Hatred is also the only game to be rated AO and have no sexual content at all. One of its developers disputed the rating, stating that they were "not quite convinced" about the rating due to its association with sexually explicit games, adding that "it's still some kind of achievement to have the second game in history getting AO rating for violence and harsh language only. Even if this violence isn't really that bad and this harsh language isn't overused."

A second trailer was released the same month, along with pre-order details. It showed new weapons (such as a flamethrower) and new execution animations. Developers claimed that shortly after the release, developer tools for Hatred would be made available. The release date was announced in April 2015.

The game was released on June 1, 2015. Shortly before the game's release, Twitch announced a ban on all AO-rated games, making it one of the few prohibited games on the streaming platform. The first set of additional downloadable content, titled Survival, was released in September 2015, for free on Steam. The content adds three new maps for Survival mode, three new playable characters, "Story" and "Insane" difficulty modes, new sidequests, new rank systems, new leaderboards and new achievements. The content contains the ability to use several cheat options, including unlimited ammunition, "God mode", and all weapons unlocked.

On October 22, 2019, the game received new DLC by way of a spin-off comic book series in conjunction with Behemoth Comics. The books are periodically released digitally on Steam individually or in a bundle with the game.

== Reception ==
Reception

Aggregate score
Aggregator	Score
Metacritic	43/100

Review scores
Publication	Score
Destructoid	5.5/10
Game Informer	5.5/10
GameSpot	3/10
PC Gamer (US)	48/100
IGN (Italy)	6/10
IGN (Spain)	5.5/10
Metro	3/10
Shacknews	3/10
Softpedia	4/5
Toronto Sun	2/5

=== Pre-release ===
Several video game press outlets responded negatively to the game's announcement trailer, particularly in condemnation of its "portrayal of wanton violence". Polygon's Colin Campbell wrote that the site's staff responded to the game's first trailer "with genuine revulsion". They described the trailer as "grisly", "extremely violent, and very tacky". PC Magazine's David Murphy wrote to "get ready for the backlash about the ultra-violent shooter ... if this game is ever released". He compared the game to Manhunt, Postal, and Mortal Kombat—other video games considered controversial for their amount of violence—and felt that Hatred "will generate just as much controversy". The trailer attracted defense of the game's right to freedom of expression, but Polygon reported that no outlet requested censorship of the game.

Rafał Pankowski, sociologist and co-founder of the "Never Again" Association, analyzed the political associations of the development team, which according to Pankowski shows many connections to the radical right.

Polygon's Ben Kuchera wrote that the trailer was a "rhetorical failure" in that it attempted to shock viewers, but ultimately reflected the 1990s "shock culture" aesthetic. In response, Zieliński said that the trailer's "so called 'shock tactic' [did] its job very well", and added that the industry reaction to the trailer reflected the political correctness—"the way we are told and taught to think"—that the game's existence sought to oppose. When questioned about links between the company and the right-wing nationalist group Polska Liga Obrony (Polish Defence League) based on a public Facebook like, Destructive Creations responded that they did not support the organization, were against "totalitarian ideologies", and appreciated the publicity despite its malevolence.

The second trailer, titled Devastation, received similar criticism, with Polygon calling it "just as vicious and cynical as the first trailer". The Guardian, Rock, Paper, Shotgun and Kotaku described Hatred as a "mass murder simulator".

=== Post-release ===
Hatred received generally negative reviews. It holds an aggregated score of 43/100 on Metacritic based on 46 reviews.

GameSpot gave Hatred a score of 3 out of 10, noting that the game's novelty wore off quickly due to a lack of variation or "thrilling five-star moment[s]", and concluding that "the fact that the final product fails even to be worth a primal psychotic scream of victory against society at large for the people it might encourage means it laughably fails even at being dangerous." Similarly, James Stephanie Sterling, while criticizing the tone, concluded that "worse than that—we got a damn boring game". Rock, Paper, Shotgun said that "Hatred fails in every way", stating that the game falls short in terms of entertainment, technical competence, and "to be a controversial, shocking experience". Chris Carter of Destructoid was also critical of one-note gameplay while noting several technical issues.

Softpedia praised the game's mechanics, calling the game "a good twin-stick shooter that manages to offer an interesting experience only through the actual theme". IGN Italy praised the game's shooting mechanics and visuals component, but criticized its repetitiveness and poor artificial intelligence; likewise IGN Spain praised the game's visuals and scenario's destructibility but panned its A.I. and poor plot.

Upon launch, Hatred quickly became a best seller on Steam, and as of February 2026, it holds a "Very Positive" response on the site.
