= List of AO-rated video games =

The ESRB's "Adults Only" ratings symbol

The Entertainment Software Rating Board (ESRB), the content rating board for games released in North America, has issued an "Adults Only" (AO) rating for 23 released video games. AO is the highest rating in the ESRB system, and indicates that the organization believes that the game's content is suitable only for players aged 18 years and over.

The majority of AO-rated games are adult video games, typically those with pornographic or strong sexual content. Three games have been given the rating solely due to extreme levels of violence: the canceled Thrill Kill (1998), the initial cut of Manhunt 2 (2007), and Hatred (2015). The only game to receive the rating for reasons other than pornographic content or extreme violence is Peak Entertainment Casinos (2003), which allows players to gamble using real money.

Grand Theft Auto: San Andreas (2004) was temporarily re-rated from M ("Mature") to AO after a sexually-explicit minigame was found hidden in the game, but the M rating was reinstated after Rockstar Games patched out the content. Fahrenheit edited out an explicit sex scene to meet the M rating. The ESRB lists a "director's cut" of the game on PC as having an AO rating, but it is unknown if this was ever publicly released.

Self-imposed restrictions by publishers, distributors, and retailers limit the availability of AO-rated games; thus, the rating has been described by journalists as a "kiss of death" and de facto ban. All three major video game console manufacturers (Nintendo, Microsoft, and Sony) prohibit AO-rated games from being published on their platforms. In May 2015, the video game livestreaming service Twitch updated its content guidelines to include a blanket ban on streaming AO-rated games, citing that a previous policy on games containing overt sexual content or extreme violence (which assessed games on a case-by-case basis) was unclear and confusing to broadcasters. This list contains only games that officially released and received an AO rating by the ESRB, and does not include unrated games with adult content which is common with Indie games that are distributed online on platforms such as Steam.

== Games released with an AO rating ==
Release	Title	Platform	Developer	Publisher	ESRB content descriptors	Notes
1993	The Joy of Sex	CD-i	Cloudscan	Philips Media	Strong sexual content	Interactive video media containing a game.
1995	Crystal Fantasy	Mac, Windows	MacDaddy Entertainment		Strong sexual content	
1996	Cyber Photographer	Mac, Windows	MacDaddy Entertainment		Strong sexual content	Also rated M under the title Cyber Photographer and Printshop.
1997	All Nude Cyber	Mac, Windows	MacDaddy Entertainment		Strong sexual content	
1997	All Nude Glamour	Mac, Windows	MacDaddy Entertainment		Strong sexual content	
1997	Riana Rouge	Mac, Windows	Black Dragon		Realistic blood and gore, strong sexual content	
1998	All Nude Nikki	Mac, Windows	MacDaddy Entertainment		Strong sexual content	
1998	Erotic Heat Vol. 4: Body Language	DVD	Diamond Productions	NuTech Digital	Strong sexual content	
2000	Playboy Screensaver: The Women of Playboy	Mac	Graphix Zone	Sony Imagesoft	Mature sexual themes	
2000	Sexy Games	Mobile phone	Unknown	Nicosceles	Sexual themes, partial nudity	
2000	Singles	Windows	Rotobee	Eidos Interactive	Nudity, strong sexual content	Digital version only. Physical release received an M rating.
2001	Snow Drop	Windows	Sweet Basil	Peach Princess	Strong sexual content	
2001	Tokimeki Check-in!	Windows	CROWD	Peach Princess	Strong sexual content	
2001	Water Closet: The Forbidden Chamber	Windows	Guilty	Peach Princess	Strong sexual content	
2001	X-Change	Windows	CROWD	Peach Princess	Strong sexual content	
2002	Critical Point	Windows	Sweet Basil	Peach Princess	Strong sexual content, violence	
2003	Peak Entertainment Casinos	Online, Windows	Peak Entertainment		Gambling	Peak Entertainment, a provider of online gambling services, submitted its product to the ESRB for an AO rating to demonstrate its commitment to discouraging underage gambling. It is the only AO-rated game to receive the rating for reasons unrelated to violence or sexual content.
2004	Leisure Suit Larry: Magna Cum Laude Uncut and Uncensored	Windows	High Voltage Software	Vivendi Universal Games	Mature humor, nudity, strong language, strong sexual content, use of alcohol	A censored version was also released for Windows, PlayStation 2 and Xbox with an M rating. In Europe, the game was released uncensored on all platforms.
2006	Playboy: The Mansion: Private Party	Windows	Cyberlore	Groove Media	Nudity, strong sexual content	Expansion pack for Playboy: The Mansion, with the base game receiving an M rating.
2009	Manhunt 2 (uncut version)	Windows	Rockstar London	Rockstar Games, Take Two Interactive	Blood and gore, intense violence, strong language, strong sexual content, use of drugs	
2013	Seduce Me	Mac, Windows	No Reply Games		Strong sexual content, nudity, strong language, use of drugs	Developed by a studio led by former Guerrilla Games employees Miriam Bellard and Andrejs Skuja, it was pulled from the Steam Greenlight program for its sexual content.
2014	Ef: A Fairy Tale of the Two	Windows	Minori	MangaGamer	Blood, nudity, sexual violence, strong language, strong sexual content	Unlike other self-rated games by MangaGamer, this game was sent to the ESRB at the request from the Japanese developer in order to get a green-light for a hardcopy release in the United States.
2015	Hatred	Windows	Destructive Creations		Blood and gore, intense violence, strong language	The game, along with its Steam Greenlight campaign, had been controversial due to its premise, which focuses on a main character who indiscriminately murders every person he encounters.

== Games that received, but were not released with an AO rating ==
In some cases, a game that initially received an AO rating from the ESRB was edited prior to their initial release in order to meet the criteria for an M rating. In selected cases, an AO-rated game was cancelled prior to its release, temporarily received the rating post-release due to the inclusion of normally inaccessible content that met the rating, the uncut version of the game was released at a later date with an AO rating, or an unrated or self-rated version, patch, or downloadable content (DLC) was released via a platform with more liberal content rules (such as Steam).

Release	Title	Platform	Developer	Publisher	ESRB content descriptors	Notes
1997	Wet: The Sexy Empire	Windows	Interactive Strip, CDV Software	CDV Software Entertainment USA	Strong sexual content	Never officially released in North America.
1998	Thrill Kill	PlayStation	Paradox Development	Virgin Interactive	Animated blood and gore, animated violence	The game's release was cancelled after publisher Virgin Interactive's U.S. operations were acquired by Electronic Arts, which objected to the game's subject matter.
2004	Grand Theft Auto: San Andreas	Windows, PlayStation 2, Xbox	Rockstar North	Rockstar Games, Take Two Interactive	Blood and gore, intense violence, nudity, strong language, strong sexual content, use of drugs	Originally rated M, San Andreas was temporarily re-rated AO following the discovery of an incomplete "Hot Coffee" minigame that could be enabled with a mod or cheating device, which featured characters engaging in sexual intercourse. Its rating was changed back to M after Rockstar released a patch that removes the offending content entirely.
2005	Lula 3D	Windows	CDV Software Entertainment USA		Blood, nudity, strong language, strong sexual content, violence	Never officially released in North America.
2005	Fahrenheit	Windows, PlayStation 2, Xbox	Quantic Dream	Atari	Blood, nudity, strong language, strong sexual content, use of drugs and alcohol, violence	Sex scenes were edited out of the game to meet the M rating for its North American release, which was also retitled Indigo Prophecy. Quantic Dream CEO Guillaume de Fondaumière remarked that many players imported the uncut European release instead. The ESRB lists a "director's cut" of the game on PC as having an AO rating, but it is unknown if this was ever publicly released. A 2015 remaster of the game received an M rating with no cuts.
2007	Manhunt 2	PlayStation 2, PlayStation Portable, Wii	Rockstar London	Rockstar Games, Take Two Interactive	Blood and gore, intense violence, strong language, strong sexual content, use of drugs	The game was edited prior to release to meet the M rating. In 2009, an uncut version was released for PC under the AO rating. Both cuts were also refused classification in the United Kingdom, but Rockstar successfully appealed for an "18" rating on the M-rated edit.
2018	Conan Exiles	Windows, PlayStation 4, Xbox One, Xbox Series X/S	Funcom		Blood and gore, intense violence, language, nudity, use of alcohol	The console versions of the game remove the full-frontal nudity present in the Windows version to meet the M rating.

== See also ==
- X rating
- List of NC-17 rated films
- List of Hong Kong Category III films
