= Backyard Wrestling 2: There Goes the Neighborhood =

2004 video game

- Xbox cover art featuring (from left to right: New Jack, adult film actress Sunrise Adams, and Violent J of Insane Clown Posse)
- Developer: Paradox Development
- Publisher: Eidos Interactive
- Series: Backyard Wrestling
- Platforms: PlayStation 2; Xbox
- Release: NA: November 16, 2004; EU: November 19, 2004; AU: December 3, 2004; JP: April 7, 2005 (PS2)
- Genre: Fighting
- Modes: Single-player, multiplayer

Backyard Wrestling 2: There Goes the Neighborhood is a fighting video game developed by Paradox Development, and published by Eidos Interactive in 2004 for PlayStation 2 and Xbox. It is the second installment in the Backyard Wrestling series and the sequel to Backyard Wrestling: Don't Try This at Home. The licensed soundtrack includes music by Andrew W.K., Kool Keith, Insane Clown Posse, Bad Brains, Body Count, Six and Violence, Mudvayne, Saliva, Fall Out Boy, and Hoobastank.

== Gameplay ==
The roster of underground wrestlers features more than 20 combatants, including notable hardcore wrestlers, music personalities, and adult film actresses.

The game includes an option for turning the game's blood effects on and off; the original game does not have said option. Each wrestler now has an introduction video. There are also 16 unlockable music videos.

=== Roster ===
Character	Place or origin/occupation
Violent J	Rapper (Insane Clown Posse), wrestler (WWE/WCW/XPW/TNA/JCW)
Shaggy 2 Dope	Rapper (Insane Clown Posse), wrestler (WWE/WCW/XPW/TNA/JCW)
Mad Man Pondo	Independent wrestler, notably JCW
Rudeboy	Appears in JCW
Vic Grimes	Independent wrestler (XPW, WWE, ECW)
Vampiro	Independent wrestler, notably for JCW and WCW
New Jack	Wrestler (ECW, XPW, TNA, various indie promotions)
Nick Mondo	Retired hardcore cult independent wrestler (CZW)
Ruckus	Independent wrestler (CZW, ROH, XPW)
The Sandman	Legendary hardcore wrestler (ECW/Japan/TNA/WWE/WCW/JCW)
Sonjay Dutt	Independent wrestler (TNA, CZW)
Masked Horn Dog	Comedy wrestler from Best of Backyard Wrestling: Backyard Babes
El Drunko	Independent wrestler
Messiah	Independent wrestler (XPW, CZW)
Supreme	Independent wrestler (XPW)
John Zandig	Independent wrestler and promoter (CZW)
Luke Hadley	Backyard wrestler
Joe Peterson	Backyard wrestler
Tylene Buck	Wrestler (WCW, XPW), model, host for Best of Backyard Wrestling
Ryuji Ito	Japanese hardcore wrestler (BJW)
Kelvin Finn	Unknown
Andrew W.K.	Musician
Tera Patrick	Porn star
Sunrise Adams	Porn star
Adrianne Pain	Unknown

== Reception ==
Reception

Aggregate score
Aggregator	Score	
Aggregator	PS2	Xbox
Metacritic	46/100	43/100

Review scores
Publication	Score	
Publication	PS2	Xbox
Electronic Gaming Monthly	5.67/10	5.67/10
Famitsu	26/40	N/A
Game Informer	5.75/10	5.75/10
GamePro	1.5/5	1.5/5
GameRevolution	D	D
GameSpot	3.4/10	3.4/10
GameZone	5/10	N/A
IGN	5.6/10	5.6/10
Official U.S. PlayStation Magazine	1.5/5	N/A
Official Xbox Magazine (US)	N/A	4.3/10

Backyard Wrestling 2: There Goes the Neighborhood received "generally unfavorable" reviews on both platforms according to video game review aggregator Metacritic. In Japan, Famitsu gave the PlayStation 2 version a score of one six, two sevens, and one six, for a total of 26 out of 40.

GamePro Germany's wrestling expert, Kai Schmidt, refused to review the game and asked in the magazine "How many variations of "Don't buy it!" can you fit into an opinion box?". His colleague, Henry Ernst, thinks the game has no justification for existence. They criticized the awkward gameplay, graphics and only praised the soundtrack, giving the game, on both consoles, a 48 out of 100.
