= Wu-Tang: Shaolin Style =

1999 video game

- North American cover art
- Developer: Paradox Development
- Publisher: Activision
- Producers: Kevin Mulhall; Oliver "Power" Grant; Duane Grant
- Designer: Benjamin Kutcher
- Programmer: Peter Jefferies
- Artist: Paul Interrante
- Writers: Adam Goldberg (story); Jay Halderman
- Composers: Wu-Tang Clan; Howard Drossin; Keith Arem
- Platform: PlayStation
- Release: NA: December 2, 1999; PAL: 1999
- Genre: Fighting
- Modes: Single-player, multiplayer

Wu-Tang: Shaolin Style, released as Wu-Tang: Taste the Pain in PAL regions, is a 1999 fighting game developed by Paradox Development and published by Activision for the PlayStation. The basis for the game's story and setting is the hip hop group Wu-Tang Clan, featuring characters based on the members' stage personas and the martial arts themes of their music. Some members of the group also provide voiceover work and made vocal and production contributions to the music.

Wu-Tang: Shaolin Style uses a unique game engine by Paradox that was originally made for their unreleased PlayStation title Thrill Kill. The game was noteworthy for allowing up to four players to fight simultaneously, a feature present in Shaolin Style. Due to the game's graphic depictions of blood and violence, a special code printed on the instruction manual must be entered within the game to see the full, uncensored action.

== Story ==
The story is mostly told through full motion video (FMV) sequences and tells the tale of a group of martial artists studying under Master Xin, the last practitioner of the ancient kung-fu discipline of Wu-Tang. The first FMV sequence shows a small army of warriors practicing martial arts in a Chinese open-air kwoon under the watchful eye of Mong Zhu. He declares his plans to discover the secrets of Wu-Tang from Master Xin, who he has discovered to be hiding out on Staten Island in New York, which will presumably give him the power to take over the world. Soon after this, Master Xin is captured by Mong Zhu's goons and the Wu-Tang Clan vow to track Zhu down and rescue their master.

The clan fight their way through Mong Zhu's various minions in an effort to rescue their master, leading them through Staten Island, mainland New York and finally China. During a torture session, Mong Zhu discovers the secrets of Wu-Tang are tattooed on Xin's chest. Mong Zhu cuts the skin with the tattoo from Xin's chest, killing Xin in the process and giving Zhu access to the secrets of the Wu-Tang.

When the clan arrive, they take down Mong Zhu and the last of his henchmen. Mong Zhu activates a gas bomb in a last-ditch attempt to take the clan with him. Realizing that his talisman is the same as the bomb Mong Zhu just used, RZA activates his own gas bomb and shoves it in Mong Zhu's mouth. While the rest of the clan open the portcullis blocking their escape, RZA grabs a lamp from the ceiling of the dojo. The clan escape outside, whereupon an explosion destroys the entire building. The game ends with Master Xin's spirit watching down over the clan and smiling.

== Gameplay ==
Shaolin Style is a tournament-style fighting game with matches ranging between two and four fighters at once, with either every fighter for themselves or in 2-on-2 or 1-on-3 team matches (in the single-player game modes the player is regularly faced with multiple opponents and outnumbered in matches). Stylized versions of all nine members of the real-life Wu-Tang Clan appear as characters in the game, with a number of fictional fighters included in the character roster ranging from human martial artists to powerful godlike beings with magical powers (which typically serve as the game's "bosses").

=== Combat ===
The combat is similar to many 3D fighting games: two punch buttons, two kick buttons, a block button, and a crouch button. The game differs by the inclusion of "lives" which are lost when the player's health bar reaches zero. When this happens, the player respawns and a life is subtracted. Should the player be killed with only one life left, their character will not respawn and they will lose the match (in team games, all the members of a team must die for victory to occur).

The player has a power-up meter that fills when the player scores or receives hits. When full, the power-up can be activated by pressing all four face buttons at once. Once this is activated, the player's moves are significantly more powerful while the power-up meter drains. Once the meter is fully drained, the effect wears off. Players are free to refill this meter as often as they can during the course of a match.

==== Finishing moves ====
Defeating the last opponent in a match will result in a fatality being performed on them in a similar vein to the Mortal Kombat series' Fatality. Each character has five different fatalities which correspond to the four face buttons on the controller, plus one corresponding to the character's throw move. Thus, the fatality performed depends on the last moved performed. Each character only starts with one available finishing move, and must unlock the additional four by playing through the story mode.

=== The 36 Chambers ===
Throughout the course of the game's Story Mode the player advances through a series of challenges, called the 36 Chambers - a reference to both the real-life rap group's debut album Enter the Wu-Tang (36 Chambers) and to the kung fu film The 36th Chamber of Shaolin. These challenges range from visiting certain locations to performing combos of a certain length. Rewards for completing these include character concept art, new game modes, characters, and fatalities. Given that some of the chambers require pulling off a certain fatality, the player may be forced to complete a certain goal before proceeding to the next one. Also, the player cannot face the last opponent (and therefore complete Story Mode) until they have first cleared 35 chambers - the 36th being awarded for defeating Mong Zhu himself.

== Reception ==
Reception

Aggregate score
Aggregator	Score
GameRankings	68%

Review scores
Publication	Score
AllGame	2/5
CNET Gamecenter	8/10
Electronic Gaming Monthly	4.5/10 (Note: Three critics of Electronic Gaming Monthly gave the game each a score of 4/10, and another gave it 6/10.)
EP Daily	7.5/10
Famitsu	21/40
Game Informer	6.25/10
GameFan	78%
GameRevolution	B−
GameSpot	5.2/10
IGN	8/10
Next Generation	3/5
Official U.S. PlayStation Magazine	3/5

The game received average reviews. GameSpot gave it a mixed review almost a month before its release date. Jim Preston of NextGen said, "A decent fighting engine, a great soundtrack, and a little ultra-violence are sewn up into a very respectable game." In Japan, however, where the game was ported and published by Success on June 29, 2000, Famitsu gave it a score of 21 out of 40.

Dan Elektro of GamePro said in one review, "If you can get your skillz up to avoid the severe punishment of the A.I., Wu-Tang: Shaolin Style packs plenty of punch." (Note: GamePro gave the game 4.5/5 for graphics, and three 4/5 scores for sound, control, and fun factor in one review.) In another GamePro review, albeit an early one, The D-Pad Destroyer said, "Party gamers looking for a good four-player brawler to play with their friends should give Wu Tang [sic] a look. There's no real Tekken-style technique involved, but get a few friends together and you'll have a good time kickin' it Shaolin Style." (Note: GamePro gave the game three 4/5 scores for graphics, control, and fun factor, and 4.5/5 for sound in another review.)

== Special Edition "W" Controller ==
Activision released a special edition set of the game, including a controller in the shape of the characteristic Wu-Tang "W". It featured all of the buttons of the original PlayStation controller, but had neither the vibration capabilities nor the analog sticks of the DualShock. Due to its unique shape it was very difficult to use, making it more of a collector's display piece than a functional control device.
