= X-Men: Mutant Academy 2 =

2001 video game

- North American PlayStation cover art
- Developer: Paradox Development
- Publisher: Activision
- Platform: PlayStation
- Release: NA: September 18, 2001; EU: September 21, 2001
- Genre: Fighting
- Modes: Single-player, multiplayer

X-Men: Mutant Academy 2 is a 2.5D fighting game for the PlayStation video game console. It was developed by Paradox Development and published by Activision on September 18, 2001. It is the sequel to X-Men: Mutant Academy and predecessor to X-Men: Next Dimension.

== Gameplay ==
X-Men: Mutant Academy 2 features much the same gameplay as its predecessor, but has new features such as the combatants Nightcrawler and Forge.

X-Men: Mutant Academy 2 is a 2.5D action fighting game. Characters and environments are modeled in 3D, but gameplay is restricted to a 2D plane. Like its predecessor, the game allows the player to select from several heroes and villains from the X-Men franchise and includes many of the signature moves from the comics. The game also includes a behind-the-scenes look at X-Men (2000) concept sketches, costumes, and other similar material. Four game modes are offered to the player.

- **Academy Training** - This is where alternate costumes can be unlocked. The majority of characters have the ability to unlock two costumes, but six characters cannot.
- **Arcade** - In this mode, it is possible to unlock the characters ending movies. Another additional feature is the ability to unlock extra characters. Psylocke is unlocked after completing the game with Wolverine, and Juggernaut is unlocked after completing the game with all characters, including Psylocke. There are two special characters that can be unlocked after obtaining the extra characters. Spider-Man is unlocked if the player encounters and defeats him in Arcade Mode, and Professor X is unlocked after beating the game with Juggernaut.
- **Versus** - Allows two players to fight each other using available characters. On defeating Arcade Mode, the Pool Party arena is unlocked, which changes the character's skins to pool/beach themes.
- **Survival** - Survival Mode allows the player to choose a single character and attempt to defeat multiple enemies without losing their own health. When the player's health bar is drained, the game is over. Each game of Survival Mode consists of one round; it counts wins and perfects (defeats without losing any of one's own health) and when defeated, places the player on a leaderboard.

=== Characters ===
X-Men: Mutant Academy 2 features 18 total playable characters, consisting of all 10 characters from the PlayStation version of Mutant Academy and eight newcomers. Mutant Academy 2 is also the only game in the series to feature a playable character from outside the X-Men franchise, that being Spider-Man. Newcomers are marked in bold:

- Beast
- Cyclops
- **Forge**
- Gambit
- **Havok**
- **Juggernaut**
- Magneto
- Mystique
- **Nightcrawler**
- Phoenix
- **Professor X**
- **Psylocke**
- **Rogue**
- Sabretooth
- **Spider-Man**
- Storm
- Toad
- Wolverine

== Reception ==
Reception

Aggregate scores
Aggregator	Score
GameRankings	71.92%
Metacritic	72/100

Review scores
Publication	Score
Computer and Video Games	6/10
Electronic Gaming Monthly	5/10
Game Informer	8.25/10
GamePro	2.5/5
GameRevolution	C+
GameSpot	8.4/10
GameSpy	73%
GameZone	7.5/10
IGN	8.3/10
Official U.S. PlayStation Magazine	3/5

Unlike X-Men: Mutant Academy, the game received mostly positive reviews by critics. Many praised the game for its improved graphics, new characters, gameplay, its hidden characters, its 3D environment, and the expanded number of combos. However, some criticized the game for its lack of gameplay modes and the combos were usually hard to pull off.

In 2011, Complex ranked it as the 43rd best fighting game of all time.
