= Zero-5 =

1994 video game

- Developer: Caspian Software
- Publishers: EU: Caspian Software; FR: Frontier Software
- Programmers: Andrew Gisby; Tony Bennett
- Artist: Andrew Gisby
- Composers: Dave Newman; James Veal
- Platform: Atari STe
- Release: EU/FRA: 1994
- Genre: Shooter
- Mode: Single-player

Zero-5 is a shooter video game developed and published by Caspian Software for the Atari STe in 1994. It is one of the last official releases for the Atari ST after being discontinued in 1993 by Atari Corporation.

Set in the year 2044, players assume the role of a recently recruited Space Hound by DEFCON to take control of the Perseus space fighter in a battle to defend Earth and counterattack the invading forces of the Morphon alien race, who wants to reach the planet and destroy the human race after picking up signal of the Europa III satellite and destroying it as a result. Zero-5 was conceived by Andrew Gisby and spent well over a year in development, though its programming routines were being changed three years prior to release and is inspired by Universal Pictures' 1984 space opera film The Last Starfighter.

Zero-5 was well received by video game magazines and commended for its 3D graphics, sound, and gameplay, but was criticized for the constant disk swapping if players did not have more than one disk drive to be used when playing the game and sold very few copies. In 1997, it received a remake by the same team for the Atari Jaguar under the same name.

== Gameplay ==
Gameplay screenshot

Zero-5 is a shooter game that is primarily played in a first-person perspective, where the player assume the role of a recruited Space Hound pilot by DEFCON to take control of the Perseus space fighter in a battle to defend Earth from the invading forces of the Morphon alien race, who are set to eradicate the human race after their signal was picked up signal by the now-destroyed Europa III satellite across 16 missions, each one featuring a different scenario and circumstances to complete in order to progress further, with later missions increasing in difficulty.

Depending on the situation, missions take place on either outer space or in the surface of a planet or an asteroid. If the Perseus sustains too much damage, it will be destroyed and the game is over, but the player is allowed to resume the last mission the game saved at the menu screen. If the game is played on an Atari ST machine that does not have more than 1MB of memory, features such as speech synthesis and other graphical effects are deactivated. When played on the Atari Falcon, the game's frame rate is increased and the visuals are improved. In addition, the game can also be played with either the Atari Jaguar joypads or Power Pad joypads (gray version of Jaguar joypads marketed for the STe and Falcon).

== Development and release ==
Zero-5 was conceived by self-taught programmer Andrew T. Gisby, who wanted to create a fast-paced shooter in 3D due to his fascination with three-dimensional simulation video games at the time and was developed over the course of one year, though the game's programming routines were originally written three years prior and he was inspired by games like Elite and movies such as The Last Starfighter, among other sources of inspiration. The music was composed by Dave Newman and James Veal.

Zero-5 was released on Europe by Caspian Software in 1994, a year after Atari Corp. officially discontinued support for the Atari ST platform before they restructured themselves to focus completely on the release and support of their newest product, the Atari Jaguar video game console, while the game itself retailed for around EU£19.99-24.99. It was also distributed in France by Frontier Software during the same time period.

== Reception ==
Reception

Review scores
Publication	Score
STart Micro	8 / 10
ST Format	92%
ST Review	86%

Zero-5 was well received by critics despite its late release on the Atari ST platform. STart Micro's Arnaud Pignard compared the game with Cybermorph but highly praised its realization, audiovisual presentation, playability and longevity. ST Format's Simon Forrester also compared the title with Carrier Command, praising its fast-pacing and structured mission variety but criticized the lack of additional weapons and ability to slowdown, as well as the constant disk swapping if players did not have more than one disk drive to be used when playing. ST Review's Tina Hackett commended the polygonal 3D graphics, sound design, addictive gameplay and longevity but criticized the constant disk swapping if players did not have more than one disk drive to use and overall accuracy of laser shots.

== Remake ==
A remake developed by most of the same team was released by Telegames for the Jaguar under the same title as the original in 1997, becoming one of the last official licensed releases for the system after it was discontinued in 1996 by Atari Corporation, who merged with JT Storage in a reverse takeover before its launch.
