= Zero 5 (Atari Jaguar video game) =

1997 video game

- Developer: Caspian Software
- Publishers: WW: Telegames; FR: Terre du Milieu
- Producers: Alistair Bodin (Atari Corp.); Chris Dillon
- Programmers: Dave Pratt; Matthew Gosling; Sean Baggaley
- Artists: David Philbedge; Mark Bloomfield
- Composers: Dave Newman; James Veal
- Platform: Atari Jaguar
- Release: WW: 29 September 1997
- Genre: Shooter
- Mode: Single-player

Zero 5 is a shooter video game developed by Caspian Software and published by Telegames exclusively for the Atari Jaguar on September 29, 1997. It is a remake of the 1994 Atari STe title of the same name and one of the last licensed releases to be published for the Jaguar after being discontinued in 1996 by Atari Corporation, who merged with JT Storage in a reverse takeover prior to its eventual launch.

Set in the year 2050 and featuring a completely different gameplay structure compared to the original title, the player assume the role of a recruited Space Hound by DEFCON to take command of both the BamBam space fighter craft and the Hit-Pak space cruiser in an attempt to defend Earth and counterattack against the invading forces of the Morphon alien race, before they reach the planet and eradicate the human race. Conceived as a commission by Atari Corp.'s UK division in an effort to incite independent developers to work with the Jaguar, development of Zero 5 began in January 1995 and went almost unreleased after Atari discontinued the system until it was eventually picked up by Telegames.

Zero 5 was met with mostly positive reception from video game magazines and dedicated outlets that reviewed it, despite its very late release on the platform. Critics praised the graphics, sound design and gameplay but was criticized for its high level of difficulty and steep learning curve. The remake was the last project developed by Caspian Software before the company was disbanded prior to release and plans for a PlayStation port were ultimately scrapped after an unsuccessful attempt with a publisher.

== Gameplay ==

Top: BamBam mode gameplay.
Middle: Hit-Pak mode gameplay.
Bottom: Trench mode gameplay.

Zero 5 is a shooter game where the player assume the role of a recruited Space Hound by DEFCON to take command of both the BamBam space fighter craft and the Hit-Pak space cruiser in a battle to defend Earth from the invading forces of the Morphon alien race, who are set to eradicate the human race after their signal was picked up signal by the now-destroyed Europa III satellite across 15 missions, each one featuring a different scenario and gameplay styles, with later missions increasing in difficulty and introducing new enemies as the player progress further. By pressing the Option button at the title screen, the player has access to the setup menu where various settings can be adjusted such as controls and sound configurations, in addition of selecting the last mission reached on the main game to resume progress and choosing any of the three levels of difficulty, each one applying a different stipulation during gameplay, with the highest one featuring missions that are longer in length compared to the other two difficulty levels.

The game is based around three types of gameplay styles depending on the mission. The first mode is a shoot 'em up where it involves the BamBam space fighter and the player is given full control of their ship in a three-dimensional environment featuring six degrees of freedom on zero gravity. The main objective is to survive against incoming enemies across all directions to finish this mode, while collecting energy pods left by them after destroying a wave of enemy crafts to increase either the ship's firepower, shield or the score by pressing 1, 2 or 3 on the keypad, and pressing 6 will activate a homing laser beam to destroy enemies but can only be used up to three times. The ship can also be rotated left and right with the C or A buttons.

The second mode is an on rails shooter segment that takes place in a first-person perspective, where involves the player controlling the Hit-Pak space cruiser and its gun turrets in environments of 360°. Like the first mode, the objective is to survive multiple waves of enemies that appear in all directions or destroying space debris to protect the ship, however there are no energy pods to be collected to regenerate shields and the player must keep focused on the radar, which displays the ship's shields and enemies. The missions involving Hit-Pak are broken into different segments, with some alternating between different playstyles.

The third and last mode revolves around flying BamBam through a confined space at high-speed inside of an alien ship and destroy its reactors, while collecting power-ups by passing through a flashing panel. Sound plays a key role during this mode, as the player's shots can determine which walls are indestructible to avoid crashing against them.

== Development and release ==
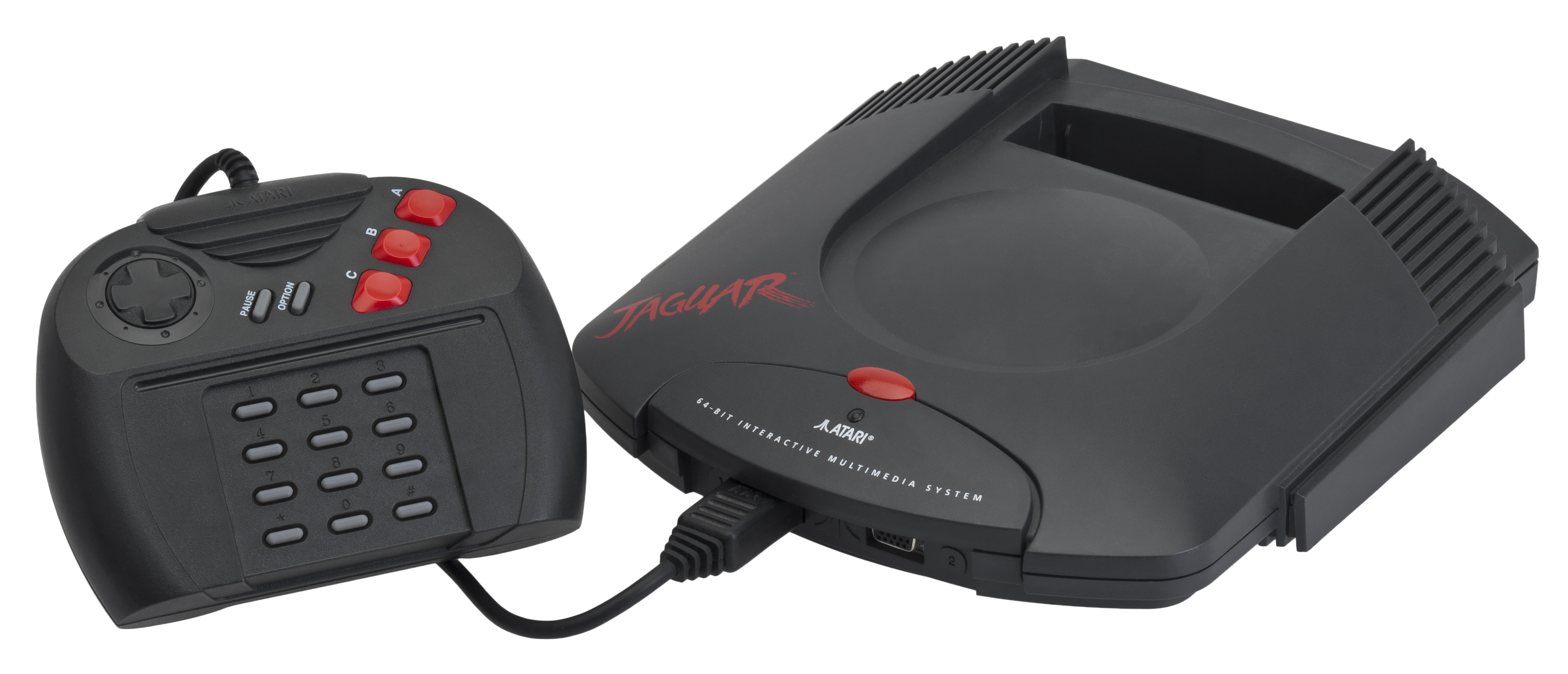
Along with Attack of the Mutant Penguins by Sunrise Games, Zero 5 was part of an effort by Atari UK to incite independent developers to work with the Jaguar.

Zero 5 is a remake of the 1994 Atari STe title of the same name, which was one of the last official releases for the Atari ST platform after being discontinued in 1993 by Atari Corporation, who would later commission Caspian Software to work alongside them as part of Atari Corp.'s European center of development, which was established in January 1995 with the aim of working alongside small game developers around the region to create titles for the Atari Jaguar. Development of the project started during the same month as Atari established their center of development in Europe and was created by a small team at Caspian Software consisting of Chris Dillon as producer, lead programmer Matthew Gosling with assistance from programmers Dave Pratt and Sean Baggaley (who previously wrote Rock 'n' Roll Clams on Atari ST), while David Philbedge and Mark Bloomfield were involved as artists. Andrew T. Gisby, who was one of the authors of the original game, worked as consultant during development and providing voice work. Dave Newman and James Veal, who worked as composers in the original game as well, returned to compose music for the remake using a proprietary sound driver called "Zik Tracker", in addition of creating sound effects. Atari UK Software Development Manager Alistair Bodin and marketing manager Darryl Still were also involved during the production.

In both an October 1997 post at the Jaguar Interactive forum and an interview with online magazine Jaguar Explorer Online, Matthew Gosling recounted about the development process of the game. Matthew claimed that the game runs at 30 frames per second and displays around 20.000 polygons on-screen with minimal texture mapping, among other techniques. He also stated that the game was originally going to feature a fourth gameplay style reminiscent of the missions found in the original game that took place on the surface of a planet or an asteroid, in addition of more enemy types and mission objectives as well as a two-player mode and support for the ProController, but these plans were scrapped due to time and cartridge space constraints. He and Chris Dillon revealed that the remake was a completely different title and took a more arcade-style approach compared to the original game outside of sharing the same title, parts of the original plot and other key elements. Matthew also stated that the game had "the lowest development budget of any Jaguar product at the time".

Zero 5 was first showcased at Autumn ECTS '95 and was originally scheduled for a November 1995 release, with internal documents from the company listing the game as still in development as of August 1995. It was planned to be published by Atari and was also covered by the magazine press that were invited to Atari's UK division. The game remained being mentioned in catalogs and magazines before Atari discontinued the Jaguar and merged with JT Storage in a reverse takeover in April 1996, until Telegames became involved and released it worldwide on September 29, 1997. Being a late release after the discontinuation of the platform, the game could be purchased either through direct order from Telegames' US and UK websites and retailers or distributors such as Electronics Boutique in North America and Terre du Milieu in France respectively. However, Matthew claimed that Atari sold the game to Telegames in an unfinished state, with none of the team members from Caspian Software receiving payment for the game's development. The remake became the last project developed by Caspian Software, as the company was disbanded due to financial difficulties. Matthew said that a port for the PlayStation was also planned but never entered into full development after an unsuccessful pitch with a publisher.

== Reception ==
Reception

Review scores
Publication	Score
GameFan	211 / 300
GamePro	16 / 20
Video Games (DE)	2/5
Atari Gaming Headquarters	4 / 10
The Atari Times	95%
Jaguar Explorer Online	3 / 5
ST-Computer	65%

Zero 5 on the Atari Jaguar garnered mostly positive reception from critics despite its very late release on the Jaguar. GameFan's three reviewers felt mixed in regards to the visual presentation but unanimously praised the techno soundtrack, regarding it to be better than most Nintendo 64 releases, intense gameplay and smooth pacing. However, criticism was geared towards the high difficulty and constant change between playstyles on each mission. GamePro's Dan Elektro commended the fast-paced polygonal visuals, controls, fun factor, sound design and techno music but also regarded this later aspect to be repetitive. He also commented that the title has a high difficulty, which can be frustrating for some players.

Atari Gaming Headquarters's Keita Iida regarded the audiovisual presentation as some of the best on the Jaguar but criticized the gameplay, specifically the three playstyles due to certain design shortcomings each one has and steep learning curve. The Atari Times's Chris Engineer also commended the visuals, audio, controls and fast-paced arcade-style gameplay between each playstyle but noted its high difficulty level.
