= X-Men: Next Dimension =

2002 video game

- Developers: Paradox Development; Exakt Entertainment (GC)
- Publisher: Activision
- Platforms: GameCube, PlayStation 2, Xbox
- Release: NA: October 22, 2002 (GC, PS2); NA: October 29, 2002 (Xbox); EU: November 22, 2002 (PS2, Xbox); EU: November 29, 2002 (GC)
- Genre: Versus fighting
- Modes: Single-player, multiplayer

X-Men: Next Dimension is a fighting game released in 2002 for the PlayStation 2, Xbox and GameCube video game consoles. It is the third installment in the X-Men: Mutant Academy fighting game series, following X-Men: Mutant Academy and X-Men: Mutant Academy 2.

Next Dimension expands upon the concept of the first two games by adding several new characters, 3D maps, and a story mode, which allows the player to fight a series of battles in between short movies that move the plot along. The game's plot serves as a sequel to the events of the comic story "Operation: Zero Tolerance".

== Gameplay ==
X-Men Next: Dimension features characters from both the X-Men and Brotherhood factions of Marvel Comics. Stages are rendered in 3D and characters have full 3D freedom of movement within the fighting plane.

The gameplay mechanics are tailored to a gradual learning curve: super attacks are performed by pressing two punch or kick buttons simultaneously, and multi-hit combos can be executed by pressing the punch and kick buttons in a particular order. The game features an extensive combo system, including normal chains, air juggles, and air launchers. In addition to the basic blocking system, various counterattacks can be executed by pressing the counterattack button and a direction on the controller. The counter-attacks are specific to the type of attack the player is countering.

The fighting stages are fully 3D rendered stages with their own layouts. It is possible to knock an opponent to a different part of the stage, which functions as its own individual stage. In the X-Mansion, for example, an opponent can be knocked from the Hangar to the Hallway, then to the outer courtyard where, after the second round, the basketball court opens up, allowing a player to be knocked back into the Hangar.

While in Story Mode, only a limited set of characters are available for each battle; Arcade Mode allows the player to select from any of the playable characters in a series of eight battles. The Two-Player Versus Mode also allows players to choose from any of the unlocked characters. The game also features a Survival Mode, in which a single player is pitted against a never-ending flow of computer-controlled opponents in a test of endurance.

In addition to the standard moves, the player can also access special and super attacks. The special attacks include blasts/beams (some of which can stun an opponent), physical attacks that have special effects (such as moving to one side before hitting) and attack throws. There are several different types of super attacks, and each have four different levels of power.

- Projectile Supers: These come in two forms. The most used form is the beam, which is a continuous stream that causes a set amount of damage if it connects. There are also gun or blast projectiles which can be fired a set number of times.
- Physical Supers: As the name implies, Physical Supers are supers that involve the character physically engaging with the opponent. Physical Supers are different from Attack Throw Supers because Physical Supers will continuously attack even if an opponent is blocking.
- Attack Throw Supers: Different and more numerous than Physical Supers, Attack Throws are attacks that only do full damage after an initial hit or grapple and are only effective if the intended victim is not performing a blocking maneuver. Most characters have at least one Attack Throw Super, and some have a full arsenal of Attack Throws.
- Unique Supers: These are supers that are unique to a certain character and include Sabretooth and Wolverine's Regeneration.

The GameCube version includes exclusive modes: Team and Practice. The Xbox version features an extra stage and the ability to play as Pyro.

== Plot ==
Narrated by Patrick Stewart (reprising his role as Professor Charles Xavier from the X-Men films), the game's plot is built around the Prime Sentinels retrieving the head of Bastion, and Bastion's subsequent attempt to wipe out mutants. The Prime Sentinels free Bastion from S.H.I.E.L.D. imprisonment, then disguise themselves and sell the defense plans of the X-Mansion to the Brotherhood of Mutants.

Juggernaut and the Brotherhood (consisting of Mystique, Toad, and Sabretooth) make their assault on the mansion. Xavier is curious as to the nature of their attack, worrying that it seems "too focused, almost like a distraction" and sends Forge to investigate the grounds. He discovers that the attack was a distraction, and that the grounds are now being patrolled by Prime Sentinels.

After attempting to fight off the Sentinels, Forge is abducted and the Brotherhood retreats. Restrained in the company of Bastion, the seemingly human Sentinel tells Forge he intends to use the man's mutant gift to bring about the extinction of mutants. He steals various weapon designs from Forge's mind, including a powerful weapon capable of stripping a mutant of their powers. In an attempt to throw the X-Men off his scent, He sends the Brotherhood to different locations across the world. The X-Men split up and engage each member in a bid to find Forge and stop the Prime Sentinel. After their defeat, the Brotherhood retreats to find Magneto in the Savage Land, only to find that Magneto has been hunted down by the Sentinels as well and is no longer in control of his fortress. The X-Men, having followed the Brotherhood, also arrive and Magneto charges the Brotherhood to fight them off long enough to convince them to join forces.

With the X-Men and the Brotherhood forming a temporary alliance, the team fights their way through a legion of Sentinels, though not without losses of their own. In the end, Magneto, Wolverine, Juggernaut, and Phoenix invade the tower for the final battle with Bastion. Bastion uses Magneto's trans-mat system to transport Juggernaut away from the tower, then escapes to Asteroid M, but he is followed by a piggybacking Wolverine. Wolverine, whose healing factor was disabled by the Sentinels earlier, manages to defeat Bastion. Magneto and Phoenix arrive to help Wolverine, and Magneto prevents a weakened Bastion from escaping again. The two battle, and Magneto is defeated.

When Bastion returns to the central room, he finds Phoenix, who challenges and finally defeats him. The Prime Sentinels are disbanded, and the X-Men and the Brotherhood agree to a temporary cease-fire while the wounded are restored to health. Forge is freed and he reverses the effects of his weapon, restoring everything to normal. With Bastion returned to S.H.I.E.L.D., the X-Men are free to continue training to fight for a better future.

Upon reaching the ending level of Asteroid M, the player has the chance to fight Bastion as three characters: Wolverine, then Magneto, and finally Phoenix. Whether Wolverine defeats Bastion or is defeated himself, the game proceeds to Magneto's fight with Bastion. If Magneto defeats Bastion, the finale video is accelerated and Phoenix does not fight Bastion. If Magneto is defeated, Bastion and Phoenix comprise the final fight of the game.

Alternate endings:

- As Phoenix prepares to finish Bastion, Cyclops appears to help Phoenix. However, while they are both distracted, Bastion kills Cyclops by blasting him and leaves his lifeless body floating in space. Distraught over Cyclops' death, Phoenix transforms into Dark Phoenix and unleashes her fury on Bastion. Professor X detects Dark Phoenix's presence and is knocked over when Dark Phoenix destroys Asteroid M, killing Wolverine and Magneto in the process. As Dark Phoenix flies through space, she destroys the Moon and prepares to destroy Earth.
- Juggernaut is revealed to be alive, but is trapped on Mars.

=== Characters ===
X-Men: Next Dimension features twenty-four playable characters, plus one additional character exclusive to the Xbox version. Nearly every character from Mutant Academy 2 returns, with the exceptions of Professor X and Spider-Man. Many can be unlocked through gameplay in other modes, and alternate costumes for each character are also available. The main costumes for each character are based on the two main X-Men comics at the time, New X-Men and X-Treme X-Men. Of these, two essentially mirror other characters, although still retaining their individuality: Phoenix is essentially similar to the unlockable Dark Phoenix, although the two differ in certain Supers (Phoenix's are more psi-based, while Dark Phoenix takes her powers from the fiery appearance of the Phoenix). Similarly, Betsy and Psylocke are essentially the same character, given that "Betsy" is based on the Betsy Braddock's telepathic incarnation and employs a "psi-blade" emerging from her fist, and "Psylocke" is based on the more recent telekinetically powered version and manifests a fully formed psionic katana in combat. New characters are marked below in bold:

- **Bastion**
- Beast
- **Betsy**
- **Bishop**
- **Blob**
- Cyclops
- **Dark Phoenix**
- Forge
- Gambit
- Havok
- Juggernaut
- **Lady Deathstrike**
- Magneto
- Mystique
- Nightcrawler
- Phoenix
- Psylocke
- **Pyro** (Note: Xbox only.)
- Rogue
- Sabretooth
- **Sentinel A**
- **Sentinel B**
- Storm
- Toad
- Wolverine

== Reception ==
Reception

Aggregate scores
Aggregator	Score
GameRankings	(GC) 62.62% (PS2) 61.79% (Xbox) 59.30%
Metacritic	(GC) 63/100 (PS2) 61/100 (Xbox) 56/100

Review scores
Publication	Score
Electronic Gaming Monthly	(PS2) 8/10, 6/10, 6/10
Eurogamer	3/10
Game Informer	7.75/10
GameRevolution	C+
GameSpot	6.4/10
GameSpy	1.5/5 (Xbox) 1/5
GameZone	(GC) 7.3/10; 7/10
IGN	(PS2) 7.2/10 (GC) 7/10 (Xbox) 6.7/10
Nintendo Power	3.6/5
Official U.S. PlayStation Magazine	3/5
Official Xbox Magazine (US)	7.3/10

Much like X-Men: Mutant Academy and unlike X-Men: Mutant Academy 2, X-Men: Next Dimension received mixed or average reviews. GameRankings and Metacritic gave it a score of 61.79% and 61 out of 100 for the PlayStation 2 version; 59.30% and 56 out of 100 for the Xbox version; and 62.62% and 63 out of 100 for the GameCube version. Some critics and fans said Next Dimension is the best game in the Mutant Academy franchise. Others criticized the GameCube and Xbox versions for its inspiration from Dead or Alive 3. Despite the criticism, many praised all versions for its improved gameplay, new characters, and excellent 3D environments.
