= X-Men: Mutant Academy =

2000 video game

- North American PlayStation cover art
- Developers: Paradox Development; Crawfish Interactive (GBC)
- Publisher: Activision
- Director: Tim Bradstock (GBC)
- Designers: Tim Coode (GBC); Daimion Pinnock (GBC)
- Platforms: PlayStation; Game Boy Color
- Release: NA: July 14, 2000; EU: August 11, 2000
- Genre: Fighting
- Modes: Single-player; Multiplayer

X-Men: Mutant Academy is a fighting game developed by Paradox Development published by Activision. It was released for PlayStation and Game Boy Color on July 14, 2000, as a tie-in to the film X-Men, which was released on the same date. A version for the Nintendo 64 had been in development prior to the game's release, but was ultimately cancelled.

Published by Activision, X-Men: Mutant Academy is a fighting game that uses six buttons: three buttons for punches and three for kicks, à la Street Fighter. Due to the success of the game, it was followed by two sequels: X-Men: Mutant Academy 2 and X-Men: Next Dimension. The game's characters can be played both with their comic book costumes and their costumes from the 2000 film X-Men. Characters not present in the film were given costumes of a similar design.

== Gameplay ==
=== PlayStation ===
The PlayStation version of X-Men: Mutant Academy features 3D stages, but largely adheres to the rules of 2D fighters. The main characters are a combination of classic X-Men characters and the 20th Century Fox X-Men film. Nearly every X-Men character is available, each with their own fighting moves (much like Street Fighter) and plenty of finishing moves to spice things up.

=== Game Boy Color ===
Due to hardware limitations, the stages in the Game Boy Color version of X-Men: Mutant Academy are rendered in 2D, and the gameplay is different from the PlayStation version. In addition to Story Mode, where one player takes on all the others in consecutive fights, there is training mode, battle mode, survival mode, and a versus mode utilizing the Game Link Cable. During a fight, a rage bar will slowly fill, which allows using powerful special moves that are activated through button combos.

== Characters ==
The game features nine selectable characters from the X-Men universe in both versions, plus one PlayStation exclusive character and two Game Boy exclusive characters. In the PlayStation version, players must unlock the ability to use the boss characters outside of versus mode; in the Game Boy version, two characters are hidden and can only be unlocked via cheat codes.

- Apocalypse (Note: Game Boy only)
- Beast (Note: PlayStation only)
- Cyclops
- Gambit
- Magneto (Note: Boss character)
- Mystique
- Phoenix
- Pyro
- Sabretooth
- Storm
- Toad
- Wolverine

== Reception ==
Reception

Aggregate scores
Aggregator	Score	
Aggregator	GBC	PS
GameRankings	47.14%	76.21%
Metacritic		75/100

Review scores
Publication	Score	
Publication	GBC	PS
AllGame	2.5/5	2.5/5
Electronic Gaming Monthly		6.83/10
Eurogamer	3/10	
Game Informer		7.5/10
GameFan		70%
GamePro		4.5/5
GameRevolution		C+
GameSpot	2.4/10	6.4/10
IGN	3/10	8/10
Nintendo Power	6.8/10	
Official U.S. PlayStation Magazine		3/5

The PlayStation version of X-Men: Mutant Academy received mixed-to-positive reviews by critics. However, the Game Boy Color version received mostly negative reviews. Many critics and fans criticized the Game Boy Color version for its lack of difficulty, and its similarity to Street Fighter Alpha. Despite the criticism, some praised the graphics in the game. Unlike the handheld version, the PlayStation version was widely praised for the gameplay, the enemy AI, and the graphics, but it was criticized for its similarity to Capcom video games, such as Street Fighter.
