= Backyard Wrestling: Don't Try This at Home =

2003 fighting video game

- Developer: Paradox Development
- Publisher: Eidos Interactive
- Designer: Kevin Gill
- Series: Backyard Wrestling
- Platforms: PlayStation 2; Xbox
- Release: NA: October 7, 2003 (PS2); NA: October 9, 2003 (Xbox); EU: November 7, 2003; JP: April 15, 2004 (PS2)
- Genre: Fighting
- Modes: Single-player, multiplayer

Backyard Wrestling is a fighting game developed by Paradox Development, and published by Eidos Interactive in 2003 for PlayStation 2 and Xbox.

== Gameplay ==
The goal of backyard wrestling is largely to use the environment to defeat an opponent. The gameplay could be better described as a cross between classic pro wrestling video games and 3D platform fighting like Power Stone.

Aside from the standard backyard locations, Backyard Wrestling's arenas include a truck stop, a slaughterhouse, an outdoor parking lot, a talk show set and a strip club. Each environment is littered with barbed wire-laden bats, fluorescent light bulbs, breakable tables, steel chairs and other objects players may use to injure their opponents.

The game has a "Story" like mode, entitled "Talk Show Mode." This mode circles around a show called "Today's Topic", which resembles The Jerry Springer Show. The talk show host, a nameless character that resembles Kevin Gill, one of the game's creators, interviews different victims and personalities of backyard wrestling. After the interview, the character is placed where the victim is and will fight three other backyard wrestlers. They will face three opponents with one health bar.

== Roster ==
- Violent J
- Shaggy 2 Dope
- Mad Man Pondo
- The Rudeboy
- Josh Prohibition
- M-Dogg 20
- JCW's Evil Dead
- Jamie Madrox
- Monoxide Child
- Sabu
- Tom Dub
- Masked Horn Dog
- El Drunko
- El Chicharron
- Karnage
- Gupta
- Masked Mike Jackson
- Sonny D. Chopper
- Atrocity XXX
- Commissioner
- Dameon Redd
- Da Bone Doctor
- Josh Asbill
- Tylene Buck
- Kitana Baker
- Sally
- Jezebel
- Rosie
- Adrianne Pain
- Hernia

== Reception ==
Reception

Aggregate score
Aggregator	Score	
Aggregator	PS2	Xbox
Metacritic	51/100	50/100

Review scores
Publication	Score	
Publication	PS2	Xbox
Electronic Gaming Monthly	5.67/10	5.67/10
Game Informer	5.5/10	5.5/10
GamePro	3.5/5	N/A
GameSpot	4.7/10	4.8/10
GameSpy	1/5	1/5
GameZone	7/10	6.5/10
IGN	6.5/10	6.5/10
Jeuxvideo.com	8/20	N/A
Play	D+	D+
TeamXbox	N/A	6.4/10
Maxim	2/10	2/10
Playboy	75%	75%

Backyard Wrestling: Don't Try This at Home received "mixed or average" reviews on both platforms according to video game review aggregator Metacritic. In Japan, Famitsu gave the PlayStation 2 version a score of 27 out of 40.

== Sequel ==
A sequel to the game, titled Backyard Wrestling 2: There Goes the Neighborhood, was released in 2004 for PlayStation 2 and Xbox.
