= Rock 'Em Sock 'Em Robots Arena =

2000 video game

- Developer: Paradox Development
- Publisher: Mattel Interactive
- Series: Rock 'Em Sock 'Em Robots
- Platform: PlayStation
- Release: NA: December 11, 2000
- Genre: Fighting game
- Modes: Single player, multiplayer

Rock 'Em Sock 'Em Robots Arena is a video game developed by Paradox and published by Mattel Interactive for the PlayStation in 2000.

== Reception ==
Reception

Aggregate score
| Aggregator | Score |
|---|---|
| Metacritic | 58/100 |

Review scores
| Publication | Score |
|---|---|
| AllGame | 1.5/5 |
| GameRevolution | C− |
| Next Generation | 2/5 |
| Official U.S. PlayStation Magazine | 3/5 |

The game received mixed reviews according to the review aggregation website Metacritic. David Chen of NextGen said that the game was "Neither dull as lead nor strong as steel." Shawn Sparks of GameRevolution found the concept of the game to be a "pretty nifty idea", but that it was poorly executed thanks to its outdated engine.
