= Midway Studios Los Angeles =

Closed video game company

Midway Studios Los Angeles Inc.
- Type: Private
- Industry: Video games
- Founded: 1994; 32 years ago
- Defunct: 2008
- Headquarters: Moorpark, California, U.S.
- Key people: Christine Hsu (Founder); Matthew Booty (Midway CEO); Scot Lane (Studio Head); Sal Divita (Creative Director)
- Products: Video games
- Parent: Midway Games (2004–2008)
- Website: www.midway.com

Midway Studios Los Angeles Inc. (formerly known as Paradox Development) was an American-based video game developer. They are best known for fighting games such as the X-Men Mutant Academy and Backyard Wrestling franchises, as well as the Mortal Kombat action game spin-off Mortal Kombat: Shaolin Monks. The team was also responsible for the controversially violent PlayStation title Thrill Kill, but the game was later cancelled.

== History ==
=== CWS Entertainment Ltd./Paradox Development era ===
Paradox Development was founded in 1994 by Christine Hsu, the former CEO/CFO of Malibu Comics Entertainment, whose company owned the shrinking video game developer Malibu Interactive, Hsu was part of a series of layoffs at the company, and went on to produce titles for top video game publishers including Activision, Electronic Arts, Virgin Interactive (later acquired by Electronic Arts), Interplay, and Namco.

In 1999, the company made a deal with THQ to develop a fishing game for PlayStation, but it was never materialized.

The company developed its distinctive fighting game engine, first used on the unreleased game Thrill Kill, and later reused on released fighting games, such as Wu-Tang: Shaolin Style for Activision, X-Men: Mutant Academy and X-Men: Mutant Academy 2 for Activision, and Rock 'Em Sock 'Em Robots Arena for Mattel Interactive.

In November 23, 2004, Midway Games Inc. acquired CWS Entertainment Ltd., which was doing business as Paradox Development. Midway announced the acquisition 7 days later; by then Paradox Development was developing Mortal Kombat: Shaolin Monks.

=== Midway Studios – Los Angeles Inc. era ===
Following the acquisition by Midway, Paradox Development was renamed to Midway Studios – Los Angeles Inc., sometimes called "Midway Los Angeles" or "Midway L.A."

In 2008, Midway Los Angeles was relocated and merged with Midway's San Diego office. The following year, publisher Midway Games filed for bankruptcy, and in August 2009 the Midway San Diego studio was closed and most of its assets were purchased by publisher THQ, who only offered about 40% of the studio's personnel new positions within the company. Many of the laid-off developers were hired by High Moon Studios.

== Developed games ==
=== CWS Entertainment Ltd./Paradox Development era ===
==== Windows ====
- Shockwave Assault

==== Sega Saturn ====
- Shockwave Assault

==== PlayStation ====
- Thrill Kill (unreleased)
- Rock 'Em Sock 'Em Robots Arena
- Wu-Tang: Shaolin Style
- X-Men: Mutant Academy
- X-Men: Mutant Academy 2
- The Lion King: Simba's Mighty Adventure

==== PlayStation 2 ====
- Backyard Wrestling 2: There Goes the Neighborhood
- Backyard Wrestling: Don't Try This at Home
- Mortal Kombat: Shaolin Monks
- X-Men: Next Dimension

==== Xbox ====
- Backyard Wrestling 2: There Goes the Neighborhood
- Backyard Wrestling: Don't Try This At Home
- X-Men: Next Dimension

=== Midway Studios - Los Angeles era ===
==== PlayStation 2 ====
- Mortal Kombat: Shaolin Monks
- TNA iMPACT!

==== Xbox ====
- Mortal Kombat: Shaolin Monks

==== Xbox 360 ====
- TNA iMPACT!

==== PlayStation 3 ====
- TNA iMPACT!

=== Wii ===
- TNA iMPACT!
