= X-Men '97 season 1 =

X-Men '97
- Season 1
- Promotional poster
- Starring: Ray Chase; Jennifer Hale; Alison Sealy-Smith; Cal Dodd; J. P. Karliak; Lenore Zann; George Buza; A. J. LoCascio; Holly Chou; Isaac Robinson-Smith; Matthew Waterson; Ross Marquand; Adrian Hough
- No. of episodes: 10

Release
- Original network: Disney+
- Original release: March 20 – May 15, 2024

Season chronology
- Next → Season 2

The first season of the American animated television series X-Men '97 is based on the Marvel Comics superhero team X-Men. The series is a revival of X-Men: The Animated Series (1992–1997), continuing the story of the X-Men following the loss of their leader, Professor X. In the season, the X-Men face the threat of a new Sentinel program created by Mister Sinister and Bastion. It was produced by Marvel Studios Animation, with Beau DeMayo as head writer and Jake Castorena as supervising director.

Ray Chase, Jennifer Hale, Alison Sealy-Smith, Cal Dodd, J. P. Karliak, Lenore Zann, George Buza, A. J. LoCascio, Holly Chou, Isaac Robinson-Smith, Matthew Waterson, Ross Marquand, and Adrian Hough star as members of the X-Men. Sealy-Smith, Dodd, Zann, Buza, and Hough reprised their roles from the original series. The revival was announced in November 2021, with DeMayo and Castorena attached. DeMayo wanted to continue the original series' melodrama and character relationships while updating its social commentary to match contemporary society. The season adapts several comic book storylines, including 2001's "E Is for Extinction" by Grant Morrison and Frank Quitely as part of developing the X-Men for a post-9/11 audience. Voice recording and animation work began by the official announcement; the animation was provided by Studio Mir and Tiger Animation.

The season premiered on the streaming service Disney+ on March 20, 2024, with its first two episodes. The other eight episodes were released weekly until May 15. It received critical acclaim and various accolades, including a Primetime Creative Arts Emmy Award nomination. A second season was confirmed in July 2022.

== Episodes ==
No. overall	No. in season	Title	Directed by	Written by	Original release date
1	1	"To Me, My X-Men"	Jake Castorena	Beau DeMayo	March 20, 2024
One year after Henry Peter Gyrich's assassination attempt on Professor Charles Xavier led to Xavier leaving Earth with the alien Shi'ar and being presumed dead, (Note: As depicted in the X-Men: The Animated Series finale episode "Graduation Day" (1997)) the X-Men continue his mission of defending mutants and humans alike. Xavier's supposed death has led to the X-Men receiving United Nations (UN) approval. They save a young mutant, Roberto da Costa, from the anti-mutant group Friends of Humanity (FoH) who are using Sentinel technology. To find Sentinel creator Bolivar Trask, the X-Men visit Gyrich in prison and Jean Grey probes his mind using the machine Cerebro to amplify her psychic abilities. She locates Trask at a junkyard in the Sahara, but also receives a horrifying premonition. The X-Men destroy the remains of several Sentinels and a Master Mold supercomputer at the junkyard and apprehend Trask. Cyclops and a pregnant Jean announce that they are leaving the X-Men to raise their son in safety. They are interrupted by their former adversary Magneto, who reveals that Xavier gave him control of the X-Men and Xavier's school for mutants in his last will and testament.
2	2	"Mutant Liberation Begins"	Chase Conley	Beau DeMayo	March 20, 2024
Magneto begins saving both humans and mutants, and refrains from killing anti-mutant militants. A distrustful Cyclops and Jean decide to stay with the X-Men while Rogue sympathizes with Magneto. When UN forces led by Dr. Valerie Cooper attempt to arrest Magneto for his past terrorism, he agrees to surrender and face trial to prove himself. During his trial at the UN's headquarters, the FoH stage an attack. Their leader, X-Cutioner, shoots at Magneto with a depowering radiation blast; Storm takes the hit for him and loses her weather-controlling abilities. Jean goes into labor and Rogue is forced to absorb an obstetrician's knowledge when he refuses to deliver a mutant's baby. Jean gives birth to a son whom she and Cyclops name Nathan. After Magneto stops X-Cutioner and the FoH, he is pardoned and discussions begin for the mutant nation Genosha to join the UN. Beast tells Storm that the blast depowered her permanently, and she decides to leave the team. While discussing her decision, the X-Men are surprised by the sudden arrival of a woman who looks identical to Jean.
3	3	"Fire Made Flesh"	Emi Yonemura	Beau DeMayo and Charley Feldman	March 27, 2024
Beast determines that the Jean look-alike is actually the real Jean Grey. The villainous Mister Sinister contacts the other Jean, revealing her to be a clone he created to gain access to her and Cyclops's DNA. Sinister takes control of her mind, turning her into the "Goblin Queen". She gives Nathan to Sinister and subjects the X-Men to horrific visions based on their own fears. Morph, who was previously corrupted and controlled by Sinister, leads the X-Men to one of Sinister's labs where they find him infecting Nathan with a techno-organic virus under the belief that it will make the child invincible. The real Jean confronts the Goblin Queen telepathically and uses their shared memories to free her from Sinister's control. The clone Jean and Cyclops save Nathan, who is left gravely ill, while Sinister escapes. The clone Jean gives Nathan to the X-Men's time-traveling ally Bishop so he can try to find a cure for the virus in the future. She takes on the name Madelyne Pryor and leaves the team. Elsewhere, a mutant named Forge introduces himself to Storm and claims that he can restore her powers.
4	4	"Motendo"	Chase Conley	Beau DeMayo and Charley Feldman	April 3, 2024
4	4	"Lifedeath – Part 1"	Chase Conley	Beau DeMayo and Charley Feldman	April 3, 2024
Jubilee wants to celebrate her 18th birthday at the arcade, but Magneto refuses and tells the team to focus on their training. Roberto consoles Jubilee, who is surprised to find a new "Motendo" video game console in her room. The pair are pulled into a video game based on her previous adventures, created by the alien slave-master Mojo who feeds off audience engagement. Jubilee enjoys reliving her past missions, but is convinced by Abscissa—an older digital copy of herself from the game's beta version—that she needs to focus on real life. Abscissa helps Jubilee and Roberto defeat Mojo, and the pair return to the real world. Jubilee kisses Roberto. Forge takes Storm to his ranch where he has created a machine that can restore her powers, though it seemingly fails. Storm notices a strange owl flying around the ranch. When Forge admits that he designed the technology which mutant inhibitor collars and X-Cutioner's radiation gun were based on, Storm leaves in anger. The owl reveals itself to be a demon called the Adversary. It brings Storm back to the ranch and poisons Forge.
5	5	"Remember It"	Emi Yonemura	Beau DeMayo	April 10, 2024
Unable to tell which memories belong to her and which belong to Madelyne, Jean reveals her emotional confusion to Wolverine and kisses him. He rejects her advances and tells her to talk with Cyclops, who she discovers has been communicating telepathically with Madelyne. Magneto, Rogue, and Gambit travel to Genosha, where the Genoshan council asks Magneto to lead the country; he agrees on the condition that Rogue leads with him. Rogue explains to Gambit that she had a secret relationship with Magneto when she was younger, as his abilities allow her to touch him without hurting him which she cannot do with Gambit. At a gala celebrating Genosha joining the UN, Rogue kisses Magneto and realizes that she made a mistake choosing him over Gambit. The time-traveling Cable arrives and Madelyne realizes that he is an adult Nathan. Cable is sent back to the future before he can warn everyone of what is coming: an upgraded Master Mold and army of Sentinels attack Genosha and kill thousands of mutants. Gambit sacrifices himself to destroy the Master Mold, leaving Rogue heartbroken.
6	6	"Lifedeath – Part 2"	Chase Conley	Charley Feldman	April 17, 2024
During a war between the Shi'ar and Kree empires, Shi'ar empress Lilandra Neramani announces her engagement to a now-healed Xavier. Refusing to accept her sister marrying a Terran, Deathbird invokes the Rite of M'Dashaa, challenging Xavier to purge all of his memories of Earth to prove his loyalty to the Shi'ar. Xavier's refusal to renounce his memories of the X-Men results in a battle between the Shi'ar Imperial Guard and Deathbird's supporters until Xavier pulls everyone into the astral plane to educate them on co-existence. When this lesson is interrupted by a psychic vision of Gambit's death, Xavier decides to return to Earth. At the ranch, Forge uses his mother's spell book to expel the demon and then Storm helps him search for a rare cactus that can cure the poison. Storm finds the cactus in a cave, but is cornered by the Adversary once again. Overcoming her fears, Storm regains her powers and defeats the Adversary. Storm heals Forge, and they learn about the attack on Genosha. Elsewhere, Trask is confronted by Mister Sinister who warns that Genosha was just the beginning.
7	7	"Bright Eyes"	Emi-Emmett Yonemura	Charley Feldman and JB Ballard	April 24, 2024
As the X-Men hold a funeral for Gambit, Rogue angrily searches for Gyrich and Trask. After gaining information from General Thunderbolt Ross and Captain America, Rogue finds Gyrich in Mexico and absorbs his memories. Gyrich is murdered later that night. While assisting in the recovery efforts at Genosha, the X-Men are contacted by a terrified Trask who tells them that he is in Madripoor. They get Rogue on the way. Roberto and Jubilee visit Roberto's mother and tell her that he is a mutant; she asks him to keep his identity a secret. In Madripoor, the X-Men learn that Sinister and the UN's secret "OZT" division have been developing a highly advanced Sentinel program. Rogue drops Trask to his death, unknowingly activating programming that turns him into a human–Sentinel hybrid. Cable arrives, defeats Trask with an EMP, and explains that Sinister is working with a greater threat that they must stop. This threat, who murdered Gyrich, is Bastion. He reveals to Sinister that Xavier is alive in space and that Magneto, presumed dead in the Genosha attack, is also alive and is Bastion's prisoner.
8	8	"Tolerance Is Extinction"	Chase Conley	Beau DeMayo and Anthony Sellitti	May 1, 2024
9	9	"Tolerance Is Extinction"	Emi-Emmett Yonemura	Anthony Sellitti	May 8, 2024
10	10	"Tolerance Is Extinction"	Chase Conley	Beau DeMayo and Anthony Sellitti	May 15, 2024
Part 1: The UN reveals to the world that Xavier is alive, inciting an anti-mutant protest outside the school. Cable explains to the X-Men that the Genosha massacre is an "absolute point" in time that cannot be changed, and Bastion will use it to start a 300-year war that will lead to the enslavement of mutants in a human utopia. Cyclops, Jean, and Cable travel to Harmony, Pennsylvania, where they learn that Bastion is a human–machine hybrid who was conceived after his father was infected with the advanced, time-traveling Sentinel Nimrod. (Note: Following the events of the X-Men: The Animated Series episode "One Man's Worth" (1995)) Members of "Operation: Zero Tolerance" (OZT) express concern over the massacre and ask Dr. Cooper to monitor Bastion, who explains to her how he is turning humans into Prime Sentinels like Trask using Sinister's techno-organic virus. Prime Sentinels activate around the world, attacking mutants and Xavier's school. A horrified Cooper releases Magneto, who creates a world-wide blackout that kills thousands of people and shuts down all Prime Sentinels. Wolverine fears that Magneto has declared war as Xavier returns and summons the X-Men. Part 2: Xavier is met with some distrust, but the X-Men focus on stopping Bastion and convincing Magneto to reverse the blackout. Magneto re-establishes his mutant haven on Asteroid M, choosing to leave Earth without power and turn his back on humanity. He invites the X-Men to join him, which Rogue and Roberto do. The rest of the X-Men return to their former base on Muir Island to regroup, before splitting into two teams: Cyclops's Blue Team goes to Asteroid M to confront Magneto while Storm and Jean's Gold Team heads to Bastion's hideout in the Galápagos Islands. Beast and Forge create a collar that can block Bastion's technopathy and sever his control over the Sentinels. The Gold Team battles an army of Bastion-controlled Sentinels as well as Sinister, who takes control of Cable's mind and uses him to overpower Jean; she sends a desperate psychic message to Cyclops. On Asteroid M, Xavier attempts to take control of Magneto's mind but is blocked, until Wolverine stabs and seriously injures Magneto. Enraged, Magneto rips out all the adamantium metal from Wolverine's skeleton. Part 3: Xavier takes control of Magneto and restores power to Earth, fracturing Magneto's mind. Jean connects to the cosmic power of the Phoenix, places the collar on Bastion which restores the Prime Sentinels' humanity, and removes Sinister's mutant augmentations which frees Cable. The X-Men fight to prevent Bastion from crashing Asteroid M into Earth and causing a new extinction event. The U.S. government launches missiles at the asteroid, killing Bastion and causing the asteroid to plummet. Xavier helps reverse the damage to Magneto's mind, and the latter sends the asteroid into space where it explodes; most of the X-Men are presumed dead. Six months later, Bishop tells Forge that the X-Men are spread throughout time: Cyclops and Jean are in 3960 A.D., a desolate future where they encounter Mother Askani and a young Nathan; and Rogue, Nightcrawler, Beast, Xavier, and Magneto are in Ancient Egypt in 3000 B.C. where they meet En Sabah Nur, a young version of Apocalypse. In a mid-credits scene, Apocalypse finds one of Gambit's playing cards in present-day Genosha.

== Cast and characters ==
=== Main ===
- Ray Chase as Scott Summers / Cyclops
- Jennifer Hale as Jean Grey and Madelyne Pryor / Goblin Queen
- Alison Sealy-Smith as Ororo Munroe / Storm and the Adversary
- Cal Dodd as Logan / Wolverine
- J. P. Karliak as Morph
- Lenore Zann as Rogue
- George Buza as Dr. Henry "Hank" McCoy / Beast
- A. J. LoCascio as Remy LeBeau / Gambit
- Holly Chou as Jubilation Lee / Jubilee
- Isaac Robinson-Smith as Lucas Bishop
- Matthew Waterson as Erik "Magnus" Lehnsherr / Magneto
- Ross Marquand as Professor Charles Xavier
- Adrian Hough as Kurt Wagner / Nightcrawler

=== Recurring ===
- Gui Agustini as Roberto da Costa / Sunspot
- Catherine Disher as Dr. Valerie Cooper
- Gavin Hammon as Dr. Bolivar Trask
- Eric Bauza as Master Mold and the Sentinels
- Donna Jay Fulks as Trish Tilby
- Christopher Britton as Dr. Nathaniel Essex / Mister Sinister
- Gil Birmingham as Forge
- Christine Uhebe as Nina da Costa
- Chris Potter as Nathan Summers / Cable
- Theo James as Bastion
- Ron Rubin as President Robert Kelly

=== Notable guests ===
- Lawrence Bayne as Carl Denti / X-Cutioner
- Todd Haberkorn as Henry Peter Gyrich and Ronan the Accuser
- David Errigo Jr. as Leech, Mojo, and Sean Cassidy / Banshee
- Courtenay Taylor as Callisto
- Alyson Court as Abscissa
- Martha Marion as Emma Frost and Dr. Moira MacTaggert
- Travis Willingham as Sebastian Shaw
- Morla Gorrondonna as Empress Lilandra Neramani
- Josh Keaton as Steve Rogers / Captain America
- Michael Patrick McGill as Thunderbolt Ross
- Rama Vallury as Baron Zemo

== Production ==
=== Development ===
X-Men '97, a revival and continuation of X-Men: The Animated Series (1992–1997), was announced by Marvel Studios Animation in November 2021. Beau DeMayo was set as head writer and executive producer, with Jake Castorena as supervising director and Charley Feldman as supervising producer. The Animated Series producer and director Larry Houston and showrunners Eric and Julia Lewald were consulting on the revival. Castorena, Chase Conley, and Emi Yonemura directed episodes of the first season. Marvel Studios's Brad Winderbaum, Kevin Feige, Louis D'Esposito, and Victoria Alonso also served as executive producers.

=== Writing ===
The season begins a year after the loss of Professor Charles Xavier during the original series' finale. Cyclops, Jean Grey, Storm, Wolverine, Rogue, Beast, Gambit, and Jubilee return as members of the X-Men, now led by their former adversary Magneto. Joining the team are Bishop, a time-traveling ally of the X-Men; Morph, who rejoins after their death and resurrection in the original series; and Kurt Wagner / Nightcrawler. Winderbaum said fans remembered these three characters as being more important in the original series than they actually were, and the creatives wanted to make up for that by elevating them in the revival. The X-Men question their future after Xavier's loss and a subsequent increase in sympathy towards mutants. Cyclops and Storm want to continue Xavier's dream but others, such as Jean Grey, want to build new lives. Magneto is moved by the growing mutant sympathy and wants to follow in Xavier's footsteps as the team's leader. The main antagonists for the season are the returning Mister Sinister and the Sentinels, along with new villain Bastion. Deadpool does not appear in the season because Marvel was saving him for the Marvel Cinematic Universe (MCU) film Deadpool & Wolverine (2024), though Winderbaum said they could have used him if there was an "insanely compelling reason".

By April 2022, the Lewalds had seen premises for all 10 episodes and several completed scripts as well as the series' bible. DeMayo hoped to retain the original series' earnestness, emotional sincerity, and focus on found family while updating the social commentary to reflect contemporary society; he felt issues of social acceptance had become more complicated since the 1990s. DeMayo said the original series' melodrama and exploration of character relationships was key to its success and set it apart from other animated series at the time, which Marvel executives felt was a compelling approach to the material. X-Men '97 also retains the campiness of the original series in its writing, such as Storm announcing her attacks and Rogue using "syrupy" Southern metaphors and analogies. DeMayo found it particularly difficult to write for Rogue, who developed in ways that he did not initially plan for throughout the season; and for Jubilee, who was introduced as a representative for younger audiences in the 1990s and needed to remain relevant for younger audiences in the modern day. DeMayo was more comfortable writing for Beast, whose scientific terms are similar to the writer's work on the series Star Trek: Strange New Worlds (2022–present).

As with the original series, various comic book storylines were adapted for the season. The Animated Series was primarily influenced by Chris Claremont's run on the comics from the mid-1970s to the early 1990s, and X-Men '97 continues to adapt stories from that era as well as elements from later in the 1990s and into Grant Morrison's early 2000s run. "The Trial of Magneto" from Uncanny X-Men #200 (1985), by Claremont and John Romita Jr., is adapted in the second episode. The third episode is a condensed version of the comic book crossover event "Inferno" (1989). The "Lifedeath" storyline from Uncanny X-Men #186 (1984), by Claremont and Barry Windsor-Smith, is adapted in the fourth and sixth episodes; the fourth episode contains two mini-episodes, the first part of "Lifedeath" and also "Motendo" which is an homage to the 1992 X-Men arcade game. Castorena was excited to include storylines that the original series had been forbidden to tell by Fox Kids, the programming block where X-Men: The Animated Series originally aired, such as the birth of Nathan Summers / Cable.

Central to DeMayo's pitch for the revival was the idea that the original series was made in a "simple [time] of right and wrong, where questions about identity and social justice had relatively clear cut answers", but the people who grew-up watching the original had since experienced 9/11, a rise in populist movements, the COVID-19 pandemic, and other traumatic events. DeMayo particularly highlighted the 2016 Pulse nightclub shooting which had personally impacted him as a gay man who had partied at that club. He wanted the X-Men to go through a similarly traumatic event and face "the realities of an adult and unsafe world" just like the audience of the original series had, which led to the attack on the mutant nation of Genosha in the fifth episode. This is based on the "E Is for Extinction" storyline from New X-Men #115 (2001) by Morrison and Frank Quitely, though the attack is not perpetrated by Cassandra Nova as in that comic. Following the fifth episode, the X-Men have to decide how they will change in response to the attack and whether social healing or social justice is needed. The reveal that Bastion is responsible for the Genosha attack leads to the season's three-part finale, which includes elements from the crossover event "Operation: Zero Tolerance" (1997). The final episodes see the X-Men split into two teams, Blue and Gold, as was done in the 1990s comics. Magneto ripping the adamantium metal from Wolverine's skeleton at the end of the ninth episode was adapted from the crossover event "Fatal Attractions" (1993).

=== Casting and voice recording ===
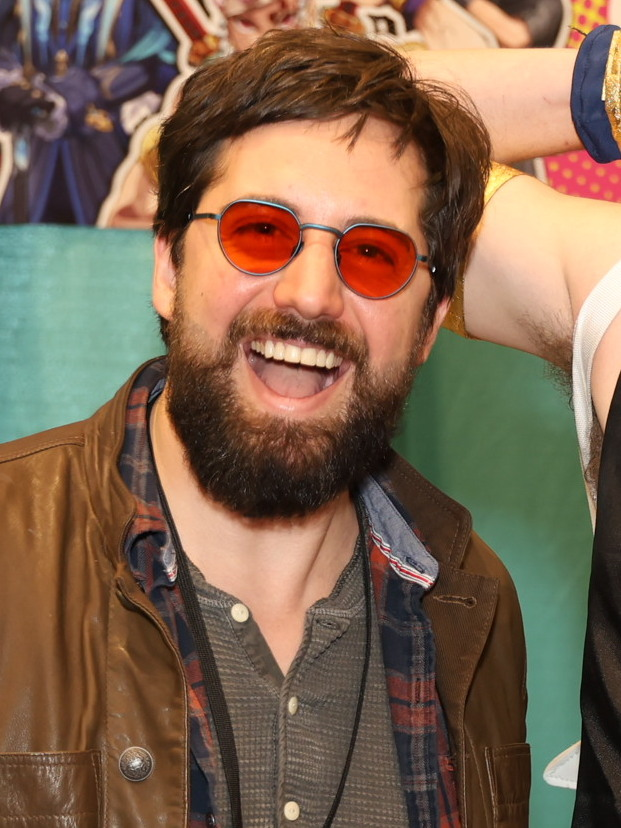
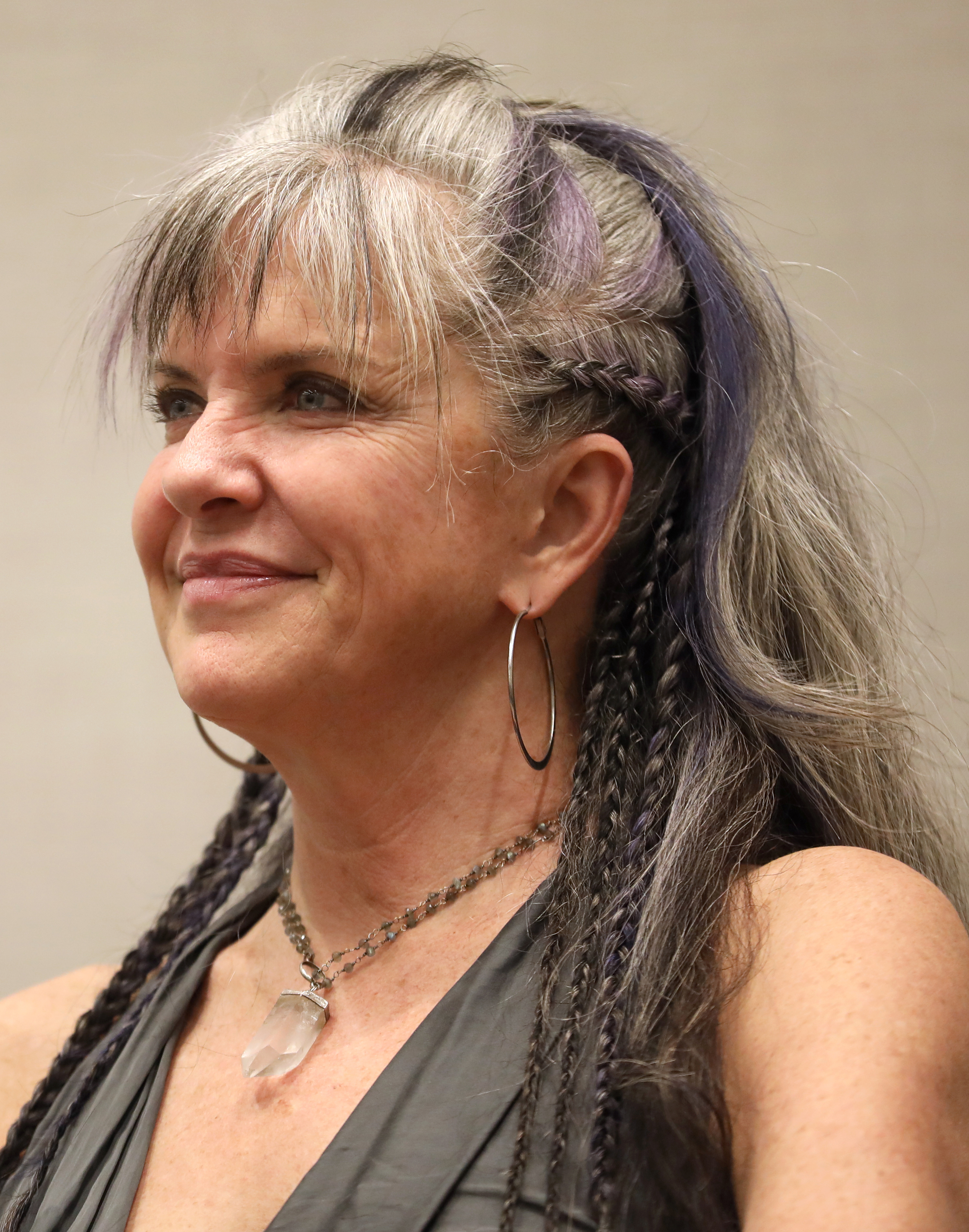
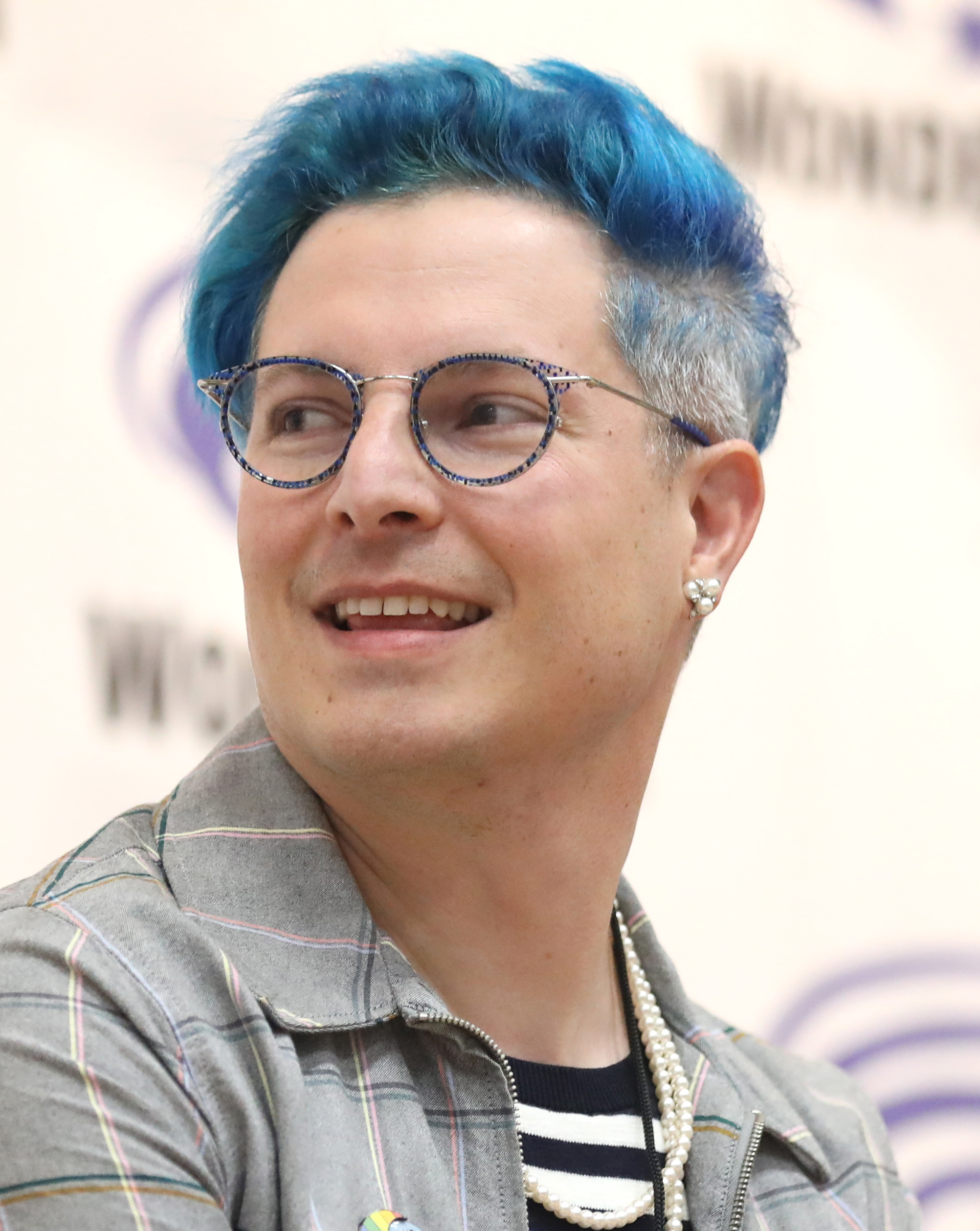
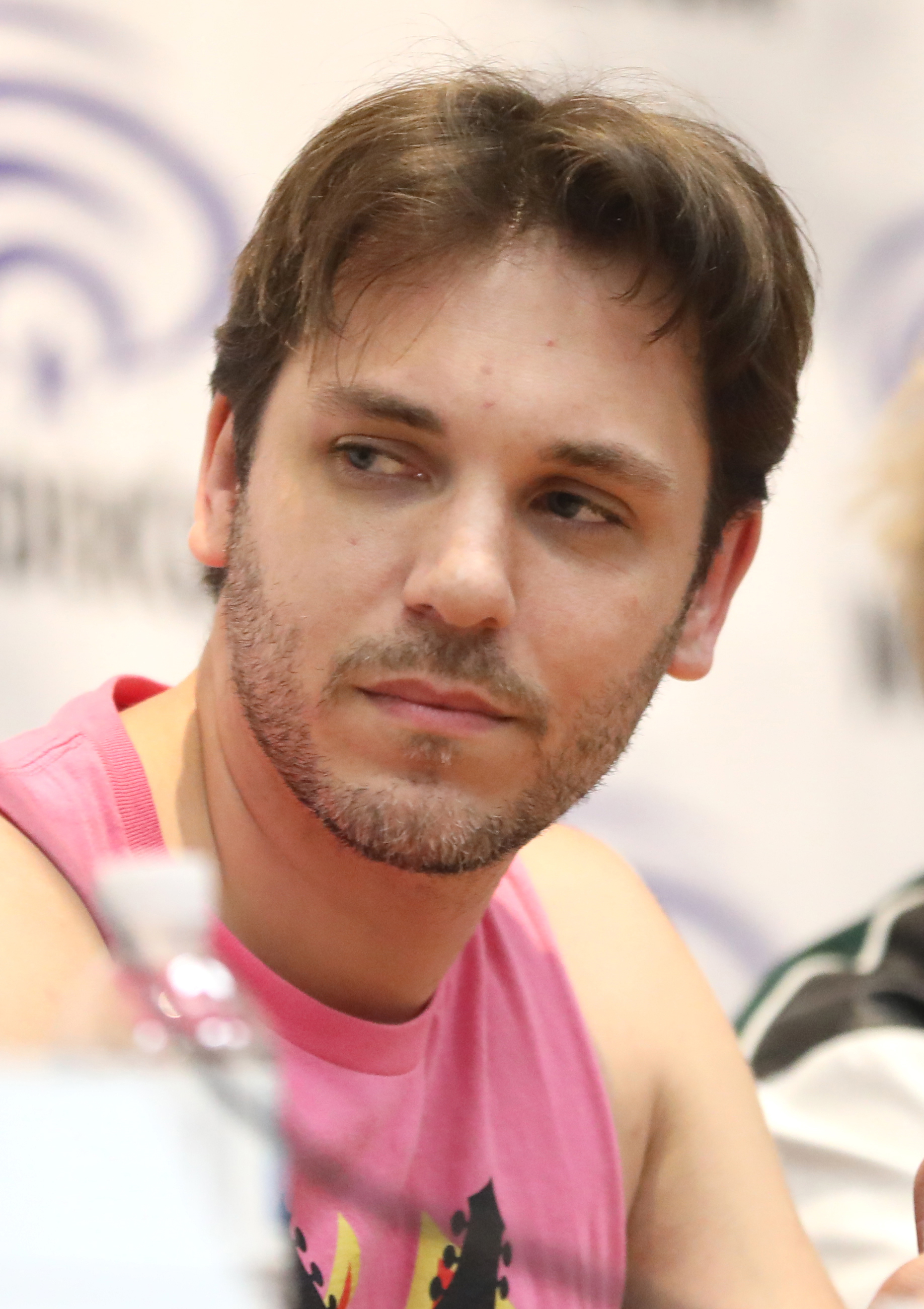
X-Men '97 features several new actors taking on roles from the original series, including Ray Chase as Cyclops, Jennifer Hale as Jean Grey, J. P. Karliak as Morph, and A. J. LoCascio as Gambit

With the revival's announcement, several voice actors were revealed to be returning from the original series: Cal Dodd (Logan / Wolverine), Lenore Zann (Rogue), George Buza (Henry "Hank" McCoy / Beast), Catherine Disher (Jean Grey), Chris Potter (Remy LeBeau / Gambit), Alison Sealy-Smith (Ororo Munroe / Storm), Adrian Hough (Kurt Wagner / Nightcrawler), Christopher Britton (Nathaniel Essex / Mister Sinister), and Alyson Court (Jubilation Lee / Jubilee). Lawrence Bayne (Nathan Summers / Cable) and Ron Rubin (Morph) also returned. Dodd, Zann, Buza, Sealy-Smith, Hough, and Britton all reprised their roles from the original series, while the others voice new roles: Disher voices Dr. Valerie Cooper, Potter voices Nathan Summers / Cable, Court voices Abscissa, Bayne voices Carl Denti / X-Cutioner, and Rubin voices President Robert Edward Kelly.

Ray Chase takes on the role of Scott Summers / Cyclops following the death of original voice actor Norm Spencer; Jennifer Hale replaces Disher as the voice of Jean Grey; Holly Chou replaces Court as Jubilation Lee / Jubilee, with Court previously stating that she would not return to the role and hoped an Asian-American actor would voice the character instead; A. J. LoCascio replaces Potter as Remy LeBeau / Gambit; Matthew Waterson voices Erik Lehnsherr / Magneto, following the death of David Hemblen; Gui Agustini voices Roberto da Costa / Sunspot; J. P. Karliak replaces Rubin as Morph; Isaac Robinson-Smith voices Lucas Bishop, replacing Philip Akin; Ross Marquand voices Professor Charles Xavier, replacing Cedric Smith; Gil Birmingham voices Forge following the death of Marc Strange; and Eric Bauza voices the Sentinels after the death of David Fox.

Meredith Layne was the casting and voice director for the series. New cast members were hired for instances where the original voice actor was not available or their voice was no longer appropriate for the character, and were intended to match the original performances. Recasting was also done to have more authentic representation, as with Court and Jubilee; because of specific vocal intonations, as with Cable to better highlight the "weird" father-son relationship with Cyclops; or for symbolic reasons, as with Disher now voicing Cooper. DeMayo explained that Cooper delivers the series' thesis and he wanted Disher to be the one to present that since he felt "she was such the heart of the original series" and her original role as Jean Grey was "the epitome of empathy". Voice recording for the season began by November 2021, primarily taking place remotely over Zoom due to the COVID-19 pandemic. Chase and Hale recorded scenes for the third episode together in-person because of how much dialogue they share in that episode, but they said this was a rare occasion for the series.

In February 2024, DeMayo said Theo James, who DeMayo worked with on the film The Witcher: Nightmare of the Wolf (2021), had been cast in a "fan favorite" role, later revealed to be Bastion. Josh Keaton and Michael Patrick McGill voice Steve Rogers / Captain America and Thunderbolt Ross, respectively, after voicing versions of those characters in the series What If...? (2021–2024). Some main cast members also voice smaller roles: Sealy-Smith as the Adversary; Hough as Strong Guy; Karliak as William Stryker and Hulk; Robinson-Smith as T'Chaka / Black Panther; and Marquand as Doctor Doom and Apocalypse. T'Chaka's appearance creates an apparent continuity error with Fantastic Four (1994–1998), where he died and was succeeded by his son T'Challa / Black Panther. DeMayo explained that during development for the season he believed it was too soon to feature T'Challa following the August 2020 death of Chadwick Boseman, who played the character in the MCU, so he chose to "put humanity before continuity". The finale introduces Adetokumboh M'Cormack as En Sabah Nur, a younger version of Apocalypse; and Gates McFadden as Mother Askani, a future version of the daughter of Summers and Grey. DeMayo and Winderbaum decided to cast McFadden after discussing her performance as Beverly Crusher in the third season of Star Trek: Picard (2023). Winderbaum felt Crusher and Jean were similar characters when he was reading X-Men comics around the same time as the series Star Trek: The Next Generation (1987–1994) was being released, so he thought it was poetic to cast McFadden as a version of Jean's daughter.

=== Animation and design ===
Animation was provided by Studio Mir and Tiger Animation. The 2D animation style of the original series was retained, but "slightly modernized" to improve the quality and reflect advances in animation since the 1990s; Castorena described the series as "fresh, but familiar". Winderbaum said there was a "code of ethics" they followed to align with the restrictions of the 1990s animation, but they occasionally broke this for dramatic effect. Work on the season's animatics began by November 2021, and full animation began by April 2023. The season was in post-production by that July.

DeMayo said the costumes chosen for each character indicated which comic book storylines were being adapted by the series. Lead character designer Amelia Vidal retained the design concepts from the original series along with the style and aesthetics of the X-Men comic books of the 1970s to the 1990s. Nightcrawler's design is based on his appearance during John Byrne and Dave Cockrum's 1970s comic book runs. In the final episodes of the season, the X-Men don costumes based on their original comic book designs and those of X-Men: Pryde of the X-Men, a failed 1989 animated television pilot. DeMayo said this costume change was always planned as part of the series' exploration of nostalgia. The original series' animators could not move Mister Sinister around much because of his complex design, which includes tendrils coming from his back; this was not an issue for the new series, but the animators chose to restrict the character's movements to align with the original series. To show emotion with Cyclops, whose eyes and eyebrows are covered by his visor, animators adjusted how the glints and reflections appeared on his visor. Castorena said other mutants' powers were also used in unique ways to convey their emotions, and his goal was to use mutant powers in ways that had not been seen before such as having Gambit charge Wolverine's claws with kinetic energy.

Morph's shape-shifting powers allow for cameo appearances by various Marvel characters, such as Archangel, Blob, Lady Deathstryke, Colossus, Psylocke, Sabretooth, Spiral, Illyana Rasputina / Magik / Darkchylde, Pietro Maximoff / Quicksilver, Juggernaut, Hulk, Sauron, and Mister Fantastic. The Morlocks group, consisting of Callisto, Leech, Tommy, Ape, and Erg, appear in several episodes. Characters seen in Genosha include Glob Herman, Pixie, Nature Girl, Gentle, Multiple Man, Exodus, Dazzler, Boom Boom, Squid-Boy, Marrow, Blob, Forearm, Angel Salvadore, Mimic, Psylocke, Cipher, Frenzy, and members of the Savage Land Mutates. Several characters from the original series appear at Gambit's funeral, including his brother Bobby; Thieves Guild member Pierre; and Assassins Guild member Bella Donna Boudreaux. Other non-speaking appearances in the season include Cyclops's brother Vulcan, who is a member of the Shi'ar Imperial Guard; Alpha Flight members Northstar, Puck, and Aurora; Japanese mutant Silver Samurai; the Russian superhero team Winter Guard which features Crimson Dynamo alongside the mutants Omega Red and Darkstar; Iron Man from the 1990s series of the same name; the magic-wielding superhero Doctor Strange; New York heroes Daredevil, Cloak, and Dagger; and the characters Peter Parker / Spider-Man, Mary Jane Watson, and Flash Thompson from Spider-Man: The Animated Series (1994–1998), revealing that Spider-Man has found Mary Jane following the events of that series' finale. Magneto sees a vision of his children Wanda Maximoff / Scarlet Witch, Quicksilver, and Lorna Dane / Polaris, while alternate versions of Polaris and Rachel Summers are seen in the future that Cable is trying to prevent. Additionally, a background in the fifth episode features the Watcher in a blink-and-you-miss-it Easter egg for fans. The Watcher was added because that character observes important moments throughout the multiverse, such as the massacre in Genosha. Castorena said this was not necessarily the same version of the Watcher that appears in What If...? since a different version of the character also appeared in the original series.

=== Music ===
John Andrew Grush and Taylor Newton Stewart—known professionally as the Newton Brothers—were announced to be the composers for X-Men '97 in July 2022. On revisiting the original series, the composers realized that the music did not match with their childhood memories and many of the original synthesizer sounds would now sound dated to modern audiences. They chose to modernize the score with an orchestra, choir, and some modern synthesizers. After discussing the score's tone with DeMayo, they decided to begin closer to the original series and modernize the music more with each episode. They began by experimenting with ideas separately and then came together to write musical suites for each main character, defining sounds and instruments which could be their "calling cards". For instance, Storm's music uses woodwind instruments, choir, and chanting to reflect the wind aspect of her powers, while a waterphone and other metallic sounds were used for Magneto. To ensure the music did not become too modern, the composers took influence from 1990s musicians such as Michael Jackson, the Prodigy, Radiohead, and Depeche Mode. Jackson's "Thriller" particularly inspired the third episode, which "got the Gothic treatment" and includes an organ. The song "Happy Nation" by Ace of Base, which was released days after X-Men: The Animated Series premiered in 1992, is used prominently in the series in relation to the nation of Genosha and the Sentinel attack on it.

A soundtrack album featuring the Newton Brothers' music for the season was released on May 24, 2024. All music composed by the Newton Brothers:

X-Men '97 (Original Soundtrack)
No.	Title	Length
1.	"X-Men '97 Theme"	1:05
2.	"The Summers"	3:03
3.	"Give Them the Forecast"	1:26
4.	"The Trial of Magneto"	1:40
5.	"Magnus the Savior"	2:46
6.	"Goodbye"	1:45
7.	"Mister Sinister"	2:32
8.	"In Hell"	1:23
9.	"Fight or Die"	2:17
10.	"Remember Who You Are"	2:16
11.	"What Have You Done?"	1:15
12.	"Fate of the X-Men"	0:59
13.	"Betrayal or Forgiveness"	1:45
14.	"Man vs. Machine"	1:40
15.	"Boss Battle"	2:09
16.	"Nightcrawler"	2:01
17.	"A Peaceful Life"	1:20
18.	"Trails of Love"	2:33
19.	"Busy Bees"	2:42
20.	"Invasion"	2:31
21.	"A Different Empire"	1:57
22.	"Sisterhood"	1:56
23.	"Galactic Peace"	1:26
24.	"She's Back"	2:21
25.	"We Need You"	1:58
26.	"Requiem to Friends"	1:14
27.	"Break In"	1:49
28.	"Time Manipulation"	1:27
29.	"Fight for Yourself"	5:26
30.	"Bonding Time"	2:02
31.	"Too Little Too Late"	1:39
32.	"Rising Up"	1:50
33.	"Sentinels Attack"	1:57
34.	"Metal Bends"	1:28
35.	"Inevitable Vision"	4:02
36.	"Bad Odds"	1:20
37.	"X"	3:58
38.	"You Hurt Me"	2:22
39.	"Rising Waters"	2:10
40.	"X-Men End Credits"	0:53
Total length:		1:22:00

== Marketing ==
The series was discussed during Marvel Studios Animation's panel at the 2022 San Diego Comic-Con, where animatics were shown. Completed animation from the season was shown a year later at the 2023 San Diego Comic-Con, where Hasbro's Marvel Legends figures for the series were also revealed. In December 2023, Marvel Comics announced a four-issue comic book prequel series, also titled X-Men '97, written by Steve Foxe and with art by Salva Espin. The comic was made in collaboration with the series' producers. Foxe said the comic was an "original tale that feeds right into" the new series. The first issue was released in March 2024. Foxe and Espin previously worked on X-Men '92, a comic book continuation of the original series. Select X-Men comic books released in March 2024 feature variant covers based on Hasbro's Marvel Legends figures for the series.

A trailer for the season was released on February 15, 2024, when the premiere date was announced. Charles Pulliam-Moore at The Verge and Joshua Rivera at Polygon both praised the trailer's nostalgia for the original series and specifically focused on the use of the original series' main theme. Ben Travis, writing for Empire, also noted the nostalgia and music as well as the "narrative weight" suggested by the trailer's character details. James Whitbrook at Gizmodo felt something was off about the trailer and identified that the animation "flits between looking oddly flat and stilted and some elements that almost look 3D", along with the combination of new and returning voice actors. However, he liked the series' aesthetic and some of the story ideas suggested by the trailer, and hoped that the elements which made him uneasy would work better when actually watching the series. The trailer reportedly set an internal Disney record as the biggest trailer launch for a Disney+ animated series, surpassing the trailers for What If...? and the service's Star Wars animated series.

Arcade1Up announced a home arcade cabinet, themed around X-Men '97, later in February. It features eight Marvel/Capcom video games: X-Men: Mutant Apocalypse (1994), Marvel Super Heroes (1995), X-Men: Children of the Atom (1995), X-Men vs. Street Fighter (1996), Marvel Super Heroes in War of the Gems (1996), Marvel Super Heroes vs. Street Fighter (1997), Marvel vs. Capcom: Clash of Super Heroes (1998), and Marvel vs. Capcom 2: New Age of Heroes (2000). The titles for each episode of the season were announced on a poster done in the style of a 1990s issue of TV Guide. The first three episodes debuted at the series' world premiere in Hollywood, Los Angeles, on March 13. By the end of the month, viewership for all five seasons of the original series had increased on Disney+ by 522 percent since the release of the trailer in February.

== Release ==
The first two episodes premiered on the streaming service Disney+ on March 20, 2024. The other eight episodes were released weekly until May 15. The season was originally scheduled for release in late 2023. It aired on Disney's cable channel FXX from June 30 to July 4, 2025.

== Reception ==
=== Viewership ===
According to Whip Media, which tracks viewership data for the 25 million worldwide users of its TV Time app, X-Men '97 was the most anticipated new series of March 2024. Disney announced that the first two episodes had 4 million views worldwide in the five days following their release, marking the biggest first-season premiere for a full-length animated series on the service since the first season of What If...? in 2021. The company announced that the first-season finale was watched by 3.5 million views globally during its first five days, which was similarly the biggest season finale for a full-length animated series on the streaming service since the first season of What If...? Disney added that viewership had grown consistently over the four episodes leading up to the finale, and views for the original series had also doubled since X-Men '97 premiered.

The series debuted on Whip's U.S. top streaming originals chart in fourth place during its premiere week. It was in third place, behind Amazon Prime Video's Invincible and Disney+'s Star Wars: The Bad Batch, for the next two weeks; in second place, behind Prime Video's Fallout, for the following three weeks; and at first place for the two weeks after that. For the week that the first-season finale was released, the series was second on Whip's chart behind Netflix's Bridgerton. JustWatch, a guide to streaming content with access to data from more than 20 million users, included X-Men '97 on its list of top 10 U.S. streaming series for the week it premiered. Luminate, which gathers viewership data from smart TVs in the U.S., reported that X-Men '97 was the fifth-most watched Disney+ series of 2024 with 1.4 billion minutes viewed.

=== Critical response ===
The first season received critical acclaim, was called "Marvel's best release in years", and was praised for its nostalgic animation, writing, and action sequences. On review aggregator Rotten Tomatoes, 99% of 81 critics gave a positive review and the average of rated reviews was 8.90/10. The critics consensus reads, "Pulling off the x-traordinary feat of staying true to its beloved predecessor while charting a path forward for the franchise, X-Men '97 is simply x-cellent." Metacritic, which uses a weighted average, assigned a score of 82 out of 100 based on 14 reviews, indicating "universal acclaim".

Jordan King of Empire praised the series for maintaining the spirit of the original X-Men: The Animated Series while introducing fresh elements, calling it "a fitting tribute to the legacy of the X-Men." Similarly, Maya Phillips of The New York Times highlighted how the show revisits the franchise's roots, noting that its themes feel more timely than ever. Some reviewers emphasized the series' successful modernization of a "beloved classic". Tatat Bunnag of the Bangkok Post praised it as a "great introduction to the classic series for a new generation." Joshua Rivera of Polygon underscored the series' focus on its characters, stating, X-Men '97 wasn't about superheroes, it was about people."

The animation style also drew attention. William Hughes of The A.V. Club noted that the revival captures the essence of the original series, commenting that it matches viewers' childhood memories rather than replicating specific elements. Alison Herman of Variety complimented the show's throwback visuals, writing that the "neon-colored, two-dimensional style" made for an engaging viewing experience. The series also garnered praise for its voice acting and storytelling. Hayden Mears of TVLine described X-Men '97 as "confident and charming," bolstered by excellent voice performances while Brian Lowry of CNN observed that the series takes advantage of the streaming format to present a slightly more adult tone while remaining true to the original's spirit. Nick Schager of The Daily Beast remarked that although it "may not reinvent the wheel," it sets the groundwork for Marvel's exciting future. Francis Agustin of the BBC noted that the series was a shift away from the heavily interconnected Marvel Cinematic Universe.

Critics also appreciated the modern themes woven throughout the show. Alex Abad-Santos of Vox posited that X-Men '97 serves as Marvel's best argument for an X-Men animated feature, while Mini Anthikad-Chhibber of The Hindu found much to enjoy in this "old-school adventure." James Whitbrook from Io9 noted that the show successfully balances nostalgia with contemporary storytelling, while Mike Ryan of Uproxx expressed surprise at how much he enjoyed the series, despite not being a die-hard fan of the original.

The series' use of nostalgia garnered mixed reactions. Charles Pulliam-Moore of The Verge referred to it as Marvel's "omega-level nostalgia play", and Witney Seibold of /Film likened the series to "classic rock," suggesting that while it's familiar and comforting, it has lost some of its edge. Yet, Seibold acknowledged that the show's appeal lies in its comforting sense of nostalgia.

=== Accolades ===
Accolades received by X-Men '97 season 1
Award	Date of ceremony	Category	Recipient(s)	Result	Ref.
ACE Eddie Awards	March 14, 2025	Best Edited Animated Series	Michelle McMillan (for "Remember It")	Won	
Annie Awards	February 8, 2025	Outstanding Achievement for Character Design in an Animated Television / Broadcast Production	Amelia Vidal (for "Mutant Liberation Begins")	Nominated	
Astra TV Awards	December 8, 2024	Best Animated Series or TV Movie	X-Men '97	Won	
Astra TV Awards	December 8, 2024	Best Voice-Over Performance	Jennifer Hale	Nominated	
Astra TV Awards	December 8, 2024	Best Voice-Over Performance	Lenore Zann	Nominated	
Astra TV Awards	December 8, 2024	Best Voice-Over Performance	Matthew Waterson	Nominated	
Black Reel TV Awards	August 13, 2024	Outstanding Drama Series	Beau DeMayo	Nominated	
Black Reel TV Awards	August 13, 2024	Outstanding Directing in a Drama Series	Chase Conley (for "Tolerance Is Extinction, Part 1")	Nominated	
Black Reel TV Awards	August 13, 2024	Outstanding Writing in a Drama Series	Beau DeMayo (for "Remember It")	Won	
Critics' Choice Television Awards	February 7, 2025	Best Animated Series	X-Men '97	Won	
Dorian TV Awards	August 12, 2024	Best Animated Show	X-Men '97	Won	
Golden Reel Awards	February 23, 2025	Outstanding Achievement in Sound Editing – Broadcast Animation	Jonathan Greber, Kyrsten Mate, Jonathon Stevens, David Acord, Cameron Barker, and Jeremy Molod (for "Fire Made Flesh")	Nominated	
Golden Trailer Awards	May 30, 2024	Best Teaser	X-Men '97 "A New Age"	Nominated	
Gotham TV Awards	June 4, 2024	Breakthrough Drama Series	Beau DeMayo, Victoria Alonso, Louis D'Esposito, Kevin Feige, and Brad Winderbaum	Nominated	
Harvey Awards	October 18, 2024	Best Adaptation from Comic Book/Graphic Novel	X-Men '97	Won	
Hollywood Professional Association Awards	November 7, 2024	Outstanding Visual Effects – Animated Episode or Series Season	Chris Graf, Dan McNaughton, Husain Untoro, Quentin Cordonnier, and Andrew Stadler	Won	
Primetime Creative Arts Emmy Awards	September 7, 2024	Outstanding Animated Program	Beau DeMayo, Victoria Alonso, Louis D'Esposito, Kevin Feige, Brad Winderbaum, Dana Vasquez-Eberhardt, Jake Castorena, Charley Feldman, Danielle Costa, Sean Gantka, Meredith Layne, Sang Hyouk Bang, Yun Mo Sung, and Emi Yonemura (for "Remember It")	Nominated	
Saturn Awards	February 2, 2025	Best Animated Series on Television	X-Men '97	Nominated	
TCA Awards	July 12, 2024	Outstanding New Program	X-Men '97	Nominated	
TCA Awards	July 12, 2024	Outstanding Achievement in Family Programming	X-Men '97	Nominated	
Venice TV Awards	September 24, 2024	Animation	X-Men '97	Nominated	

== Documentary special ==
In February 2021, the documentary series Marvel Studios: Assembled was announced. The specials go behind the scenes of the Marvel Studios films and television series with cast members and additional creatives. The special for this season, "The Making of X-Men '97", features cast members from the original series and X-Men '97, and explores the origins of the original series. It was released on Disney+ on May 22, 2024.
