= X-Men: Second Coming =

2010 Marvel Comics story arc

- Cover to X-Men: Second Coming #1
- Publisher: Marvel Comics
- Publication date: March – July 2010
- Genre: Superhero
Title(s)
New Mutants vol. 2 #12-14
The Uncanny X-Men #523-525
X-Force vol. 3 #26-28
X-Men: Legacy #235-237
X-Factor #204-206
Cable #25
Second Coming: Prepare #1
X-Men: Second Coming #1-2
X-Men: Blind Science #1
X-Men: Hellbound #1-3
- Main character(s): X-Men; New Mutants; Cable; Hope Summers; Cyclops; Nightcrawler; Rogue; Bastion; Donald Pierce

Creative team
- Writer(s): Craig Kyle; Christopher Yost; Matt Fraction; Zeb Wells; Mike Carey
- Penciller(s): David Finch; Terry Dodson; Ibraim Roberson; Greg Land; Mike Choi
- Colorist(s): Rachel Dodson; Sonia Oback
- Hardcover: ISBN 0-7851-4678-4

"X-Men: Second Coming" is a 2010 comic book crossover storyline published by Marvel Comics that ran through most of the X-Men comic books published from March to July 2010.

== Publication history ==
Second Coming is the final part of a trilogy of stories that began with "Messiah Complex" and continued in "Messiah War". It is intended as a conclusion to Cable's efforts to save Hope Summers from Bishop, who has hunted her since her birth. The series also builds on the "Utopia", "Nation X" and "Necrosha" storylines of 2009 in the X-Men books.

The story centers on the return of Cable and Hope Summers to the present day and Bastion's final campaign to destroy the X-Men.

== Plot ==
Cable and Hope Summers return from the future to the present, sparking action from Bastion and his allies Stephen Lang, Bolivar Trask, William Stryker, Graydon Creed and Cameron Hodge. Bastion tells them that the Mutant Messiah has returned and gives them orders to kill her.

As the Alpha Team (Wolverine, X-23, Angel, Colossus, Nightcrawler, Psylocke and Magik) battle Stryker and his Purifiers, Magik makes her way toward Hope under orders from Wolverine to teleport her to Utopia. Cable remains behind with some of the X-Men after learning from the New Mutants that he was being tracked, while Rogue, Nightcrawler and Hope leave.

Meanwhile, the New Mutants arrive at Cameron Hodge's facility. Hodge impales Karma's leg in the battle, leading to the leg being amputated. However, Hodge's army of "Smileys" are killed by Warlock, who absorbs their life force. The New Mutants warn Cyclops of Bastion's powers.

The Alpha Team is attacked by armoured soldiers, and in response, Psylocke telekinetically sends X-23 to the jet and commandeer it. Nightcrawler, Rogue, and Hope arrive in Nevada. There, Bastion appears and brutally beats Rogue. He is about to kill Hope when Nightcrawler teleports between them and is impaled in the chest. Nightcrawler teleports Hope to Utopia and tells her that he believes in her before dying.

Three and a half miles away from San Francisco, the X-Club investigate an oil rig and discover a ticking timer. Suddenly, it explodes, and Cyclops is certain that the X-Men's jets, the Blackbirds, have been decimated. Donald Pierce is found standing amid the debris and rues that he will not live to witness the decimation of the mutant race. Cyclops eliminates him with an optic blast and alerts the X-Men to expect an attack. With no means of transportation, Cyclops announces that they are trapped on Utopia. Meanwhile, the X-Club Science team are stranded just outside San Francisco and Utopia.

An offshore explosion rocks Utopia, sending the X-Men reeling. After gathering near the Bay, they find an energy dome enveloping San Francisco and Utopia. Namor appears and informs Cyclops that the energy dome also descends into the ocean floor, making it a sphere. When the X-Men investigate, a group of Nimrods emerge from the sphere.

Beast explains that Bastion has created a portal powered by an energy source of unknown origin that connects to another time period. Cyclops begins to formulate a new strategy which hinges on Cable using his last time jump to take X-Force to the future to deactivate the Sentinels. Cyclops sends all battle-worthy mutants to the portal and tells them to prepare for another attack.

The X-Men then engage the Nimrods in battles all around the city. A Nimrod approaches Utopia and breaches its outer wall. Cyclops quickly shuts down several levels of the complex except for those most crucial and the resulting explosion destroys the Nimrod. Within the city and at the Port of Oakland, Storm, Surge, Iceman, Psylocke, Fantomex, and Namor manage to destroy several Nimrods through coordinated efforts. Though at low power after a recent coma, Magneto defends the island against many Nimrods to buy Beast time to treat the wounded.

In the future, X-force fights it way into a Sentinel Processing Centre, where Cypher takes over the programming of Master Mold and they shut down all of the Nimrods in both the present and future. Their mission completed, X-Force retrieves Cable and Cypher, going to the time portal to escape back to the present. However, X-23 is brutally burned while attempting to cross through the portal. X-Force comes to the conclusion that only inorganic matter is able to pass through the portal. With no other alternative, Cable sacrifices himself to hold the portal open and allow the others to return home.

Bastion appears with the reanimated Graydon Creed and Stephen Lang commenting that while the Nimrods are gone, mutantkind is still trapped and that he will deal with the remaining mutants himself. After witnessing Cable's sacrifice, Hope kills Lang and Creed. With the assistance of the X-Men, she eradicates Bastion and shatters the dome surrounding the city. At a celebratory bonfire, Emma Frost notices the flames around Hope take the shape of the Phoenix. Frost runs to warn Cyclops, who tells her that Cerebra has found five new mutants around the globe.

== Tie-ins and one-shots ==
As part of the cross-over, a number of tie-in mini-series and one-shots were released.

- Revelations: X-Factor - Written by Peter David and drawn by Valentine De Landro, this story arc, starting with issue #204, features the reanimated leader of the Mutant Response Division, Bolivar Trask, as he tries to kill every member of X-Factor.
- Revelations: Hellbound - Written by Chris Yost and drawn by Harvey Tolibao and Sandu Florea, the three issue mini-series features Magik being banished to Limbo by a weaponised spell where she is conspired against by an old enemy. Cannonball leads a team which includes Northstar, Trance, Dazzler, Gambit, Pixie, and Anole on a mission to rescue her.
- Revelations: Blind Science - Written by Simon Spurrier and drawn by Paul Davidson and Francis Portela, this one-shot features members of the X-Club trying to unravel a trap set by Bastion.

== Aftermath ==
After leaving the X-Men due to Cyclops' more militant style of leadership, Beast heads to L.A. to meet up with his girlfriend Abigail Brand who stands him up, only to meet up with Molly Hayes of the Runaways. The two discuss extinction, faith, and living life to its fullest.

Hope is at the Baxter Building with Doctor Nemesis and Rogue, receiving a physical from Mister Fantastic, as well as conversing with his son Franklin Richards. Upon giving Hope a clean bill of health, Reed suggests that Hope try to locate her family in an attempt to learn more about who she really is. On the way back to Utopia, Hope insists on doing just that.

Cyclops takes some time off to go hunting in the Savage Land, during which he encounters Steve Rogers, who suggests that Cyclops bring the X-Men out of the shadows and into the light as heroes. Rogers arranges to have the President award Scott the Presidential Medal of Freedom, which sways the people of San Francisco to welcome the X-Men back.

During a celebration held on Utopia, Cyclops absconds to converse with Hope, with the objective of discussing a plan to address the five lights. Hope becomes restless and expresses her desire to locate her family. Scott recognizes his improper behavior towards Hope, and resolves to handle the lights himself, while assigning a team to escort Hope to Alaska, which pleases her.

The story line spans-off a new ongoing series, Generation Hope that focuses on the five lights.

New Series	Cancelled Series
Uncanny X-Force #1-35 5.1 19.1	X-Force #1-28
Daken: Dark Wolverine #1-23 9.1	Dark Wolverine #75-90
Wolverine #1-20 5.1 300-317	Wolverine: Origins #1-50
Wolverine: The Best There Is #1-12	Wolverine Weapon X #1-16
Namor: The First Mutant #1-11	Cable #1-25
X-Men Vol. 3 #1-42
Generation Hope #1-17
X-23 #1-21

== Reading order ==
The comic books involved include issues of New Mutants, Uncanny X-Men, X-Force and X-Men: Legacy with cover dates starting in April 2010 as well as a two-shot titled X-Men: Second Coming published by Marvel Comics, released in March 2010.

March 2010

- Chapter 1: X-Men: Second Coming #1

April 2010

- Chapter 2: Uncanny X-Men #523
- Chapter 3: New Mutants #12
- Chapter 4: X-Men: Legacy #235
- Chapter 5: X-Force #26

May 2010

- Chapter 6: Uncanny X-Men #524
- Chapter 7: New Mutants #13
- Chapter 8: X-Men: Legacy #236
- Chapter 9: X-Force #27

June 2010

- Chapter 10: Uncanny X-Men #525
- Chapter 11: New Mutants #14
- Chapter 12: X-Men: Legacy #237

July 2010

- Chapter 13: X-Force #28
- Chapter 14: X-Men: Second Coming #2

=== Additional books ===
February 2010

- Prologue: X-Men: Second Coming Prepare

April 2010

- Cable #25 (renamed Deadpool and Cable #25)- released with chapter 2
- X-Men: Second Coming - Revelations: X-Factor #204 - released with chapter 4

May 2010

- X-Men: Second Coming - Revelations: Hellbound #1 - released with chapter 6
- X-Men: Second Coming - Revelations: X-Factor #205 - released with chapter 8
- X-Men: Second Coming - Revelations: Blind Science #1 - released with chapter 9

June 2010

- X-Men: Second Coming - Revelations: Hellbound #2 - released with chapter 10
- X-Men: Second Coming - Revelations: X-Factor #206 - released with chapter 12

July 2010

- X-Men: Second Coming - Revelations: Hellbound #3 - released with chapter 14
- Uncanny X-Men: The Heroic Age - released with chapter 14
- X-Men Phoenix Force Handbook #1

== Collected editions ==
The comic books are being collected into single volumes:

- X-Men: Second Coming (collects Second Coming: Prepare, X-Men: Second Coming #1-2, Uncanny X-Men #523-525, New Mutants #12-14, X-Men: Legacy #235-237 and X-Force #26-28, 472 pages, hardcover, October 2010, ISBN 0-7851-4678-4)
- X-Men: Second Coming Revelations (collects X-Men: Hope, X-Men: Blind Science, X-Men: Hellbound #1-3 and X-Factor 204–206, 200 pages, ISBN 0-7851-5007-2)
