= Steven Lang =

Steven Lang may refer to:

- Steven Lang (character), a character from Marvel Comics
- Steven Lang (footballer) (born 1987), Swiss footballer

== See also ==
- Steve Lang (1949–2017), Canadian musician
- Stephen Lang (born 1952), American actor and playwright
