= X-Men: The Official Game =

2006 video game

- North American PlayStation 2 cover art
- Developers: Z-Axis (PS2 / Xbox / X360); Hypnos Entertainment (GameCube); Beenox (PC); WayForward Technologies (GBA); Amaze Entertainment (DS)
- Publisher: Activision
- Director: Jens Hartvig Andersen
- Producer: Trevor Jalowitz
- Designer: Jason VandenBerghe
- Artist: Michael Kawas
- Composers: Chance Thomas; Nick Peck; Stewart Miles; Rik W. Schaffer; Jeff Dodson
- Platforms: Microsoft Windows, PlayStation 2, GameCube, Xbox, Xbox 360, Game Boy Advance, Nintendo DS
- Release: NA: May 16, 2006; EU: May 19, 2006
- Genres: Action, beat 'em up
- Mode: Single-player

X-Men: The Official Game (also known as X3: The Official Game) is a 2006 beat 'em up video game developed by Z-Axis and published by Activision. It is a tie-in to X-Men: The Last Stand. The game covers the events between the films X2 and X-Men: The Last Stand, specifically following Wolverine, Nightcrawler, and Iceman. It also bridges the gap between the two films, explaining why Nightcrawler is not present for The Last Stand, and introduces new foes to the story, such as Hydra. The game uses several voice actors from the X-Men film series including Hugh Jackman, Alan Cumming, Shawn Ashmore, Patrick Stewart, Tyler Mane, and Eric Dane. Furthermore, the game's story was written by The Last Stand co-writer Zak Penn and X-Men comics writer Chris Claremont.

X-Men: The Official Game received mixed reviews from critics. The game, along with most other games published by Activision that had used the Marvel license, was de-listed and removed from digital storefronts on January 1, 2014.

== Gameplay ==
Players control the actions of several X-Men-related characters, most notably Wolverine, Nightcrawler and Iceman, as they uncover a plot to eradicate mutants. Sometimes, another X-Man will help the player's character battle. The Nintendo DS version features Magneto as a playable character, while the Game Boy Advance version features Colossus as a playable character, as well as the ability to switch between characters.

=== Consoles ===
- Wolverine's levels involve fighting hordes of soldiers, armed with weapons. He can retract his claws, but any time a button is pressed, they are extracted. Wolverine heals minor wounds, reflected as yellow on his Life Gauge, but when his minor wound damage empties, all wounds are considered major, taking off his actual life bar. He can only heal major damage if he is not engaged in combat at the time. Wolverine can't target lock like his allies; he can only block, which can fend off weak attacks only until it is built up. By attacking his enemies, Wolverine builds up a Fury Bar, which, when activated, increases his healing rate and his strength. It also changes his attacks' appearances.
- Nightcrawler's levels involve mostly platforming missions, running along pipes in the ceiling and teleporting. Nightcrawler can teleport to any area within his visual range. Like Wolverine, Nightcrawler heals by holding down a button, only Nightcrawler constantly takes life gauge damage, and when he heals, it is called "Shadowmeld" or "Shadow Aura", a nod to his ability to camouflage in the comics. Nightcrawler can teleport behind and combo-attack several foes during a brawl.
- Iceman's levels resemble flight-sim games, like Star Wars: Rogue Squadron, as he continuously rides on his trademark ice slide. Iceman creates an icy path in front of him, flying through the air while shooting his ice beam and ice projectiles. Iceman's attacks are an Ice Beam, which cools off fires and damages foes; Frost Shield, which will cancel any damage he takes while it is "up"; and Hailstorm, which is his main attack, hurling several balls of ice at targets. Iceman will heal automatically as long as he does not incur damage for an amount of time. The player must keep up a quick speed when sliding, as slowing down too much will knock Iceman off the slide.

== Plot ==
During a session in the Xavier institute's Danger Room, Logan / Wolverine battles Victor Creed / Sabretooth, and ultimately ends up losing the session, though he had been saved by the timely arrival of Bobby Drake / Iceman, who was there so that Scott Summers / Cyclops could train him, but Cyclops is too crippled with grief to do so due to Jean Grey's apparent death. (Note: as depicted in X2: X-Men United) After Logan trains Iceman in the Danger Room, Charles Xavier / Professor X warns Logan against setting the Danger Room on "Danger Level 10" again, before asking the X-Men to return to Alkali Lake to retrieve irreplaceable parts to Cerebro. Kurt Wagner / Nightcrawler infiltrates the remnants of Col. William Stryker's base with his teleportation ability, since the weapons systems were somehow operational. Once inside, the X-Men discover a group of Hydra agents looting the base. Nightcrawler and Peter Rasputin / Colossus go to find the Cerebro parts while Logan and Ororo Munroe / Storm investigate Hydra's presence. Logan and Storm discover that Stryker had been building giant robots called Sentinels to eradicate mutants.

Storm is abducted by Yuriko Oyama / Lady Deathstrike and Logan pursues her, eventually rescuing Storm. Nightcrawler is plagued by visions of Jason Stryker, who reminds Nightcrawler that he left him to die. Nightcrawler retrieves the Cerebro parts, battling a Sentinel in the process. A massive Sentinel, Master Mold, is activated and rises from Alkali Lake. The X-Men and Lady Deathstrike escape; Logan attaches himself to Deathstrike's helicopter to follow her while the other X-Men return to the institute.

Iceman stops Pyro from triggering a meltdown at a nuclear power plant while Storm and Nightcrawler stop Multiple Man from blowing up a bridge. (Note: This storyline is continued in X-Men: The Last Stand, when Magneto and his new Brotherhood free Multiple Man from a prison convoy.) Meanwhile, Logan follows Deathstrike and her Hydra agents to Japan, where he learns that Deathstrike and Hydra are working for Silver Samurai. After battling though legions of Hydra forces and "killing" Deathstrike again, Logan confronts Silver Samurai. Samurai reveals that Hydra helped Stryker build the Sentinels, not realizing he planned to turn them against mutants. Silver Samurai himself is a mutant, and Master Mold's activation was a mistake. After defeating Silver Samurai, Logan learns that Hydra has a device in Hong Kong that can stop Master Mold, where Master Mold is currently heading, and informs Xavier about it, who then contacts Erik Lehnsherr / Magneto, fearing the X-Men cannot stop the Sentinels alone. Magneto and Sabretooth travel to Hong Kong to help the X-Men. Xavier also reveals that Jason Stryker is still alive; his psyche now fractured into two halves: a good half who has been appearing to Nightcrawler and an evil half that is controlling Master Mold. He states that another of his students had a similar problem (referring to Jean Grey/Phoenix).

The X-Jet is shot down by Sentinels upon its arrival in Hong Kong. Iceman battles Sentinels and recovers Hydra's device. Magneto arrives and uses the device to incapacitate Master Mold, which crashes to the ground, but his helmet is knocked off of his head and Magneto is subdued by Jason's telepathic powers.

Nightcrawler disables Master Mold's control center, guided by Jason's good half, who helps point the way through the maze of the Mold's body. Nightcrawler then disables Master Mold's neural net, changed by Jason to look like a demonic realm. Meanwhile, Iceman destroys the core of Master Mold and Logan - in another of Jason's hallucinations - fights several feral clones of himself, emerging victorious. Nightcrawler attempts to save Jason as Master Mold begins to collapse, but Sabretooth abducts Jason and attempts to make his escape. Logan tracks Sabretooth's scent and confronts him while Nightcrawler escapes with Jason. The two have a vicious battle, ending with Logan throwing Sabretooth from a great height to be impaled below. Jason dies, thanking Nightcrawler for saving him. Magneto leaves, vowing that his next encounter with the X-Men will be as an enemy.

Back at Xavier's mansion, Nightcrawler tells Xavier he does not want to be an X-Man, for their lives are too violent and he is a peaceful man. Xavier tells him he is always welcome in the Mansion, and Nightcrawler leaves. (Note: This explains his absence in X-Men: The Last Stand.) It is also revealed that Chinese media has covered up the entire incident in Hong Kong. Meanwhile, in what appears to be a dream, Cyclops goes to Jean Grey's house and sees her younger self in the company of Xavier and Lehnsherr; as her powers begin spiraling out of control, the door shuts on Cyclops, who desperately begs to be let inside. (Note: This occurrence foreshadows the events of X-Men: The Last Stand. Later in the film continuity, the Silver Samurai, Trask Industries and the Sentinels made appearances in The Wolverine and X-Men: Days of Future Past.)

== Reception ==
Reception

Aggregate score
Aggregator	Score
Metacritic	(DS) 50/100 (GBA) 55/100 (GC) 50/100 (PC) 52/100 (PS2) 52/100 (Xbox) 53/100 (X360) 52/100

Review scores
Publication	Score
Electronic Gaming Monthly	3.83/10
Eurogamer	3/10
Game Informer	4/10
GameRevolution	C−
GameSpot	(GBA) 6.6/10; 5.6/10 (X360) 5.3/10 (DS) 4.3/10
GameSpy	2/5
GameTrailers	6.4/10
GameZone	8.9/10 (PC) 8.8/10 (GBA) 6.7/10 (DS) 6/10 (PS2) 5.6/10 (GC) 5.4/10
IGN	5.9/10 (DS & PC) 5.7/10 (GBA) 5/10
Nintendo Power	(DS) 7/10 (GC) 6.5/10 (GBA) 3.5/10
Official U.S. PlayStation Magazine	3/5
Official Xbox Magazine (US)	(Xbox) 7.5/10 (X360) 7/10
PC Gamer (US)	40%
The A.V. Club	D
Detroit Free Press	3/4

X-Men: The Official Game received "mixed or average" reviews, according to review aggregator platform Metacritic.

On the consoles and PC, some of the problems cited were repetitive gameplay, poor enemy AI and the fact that the Xbox 360 version looked similar to the other console versions despite the better hardware. Detroit Free Press gave the Xbox 360 version three stars out of four and said, "I'd be happier if Cyclops were at my fingertips, too. But all in all, the variety these three X-Men provide is adequate for one little video game". The Times gave the game a mixed review and stated that "nice graphics and smooth gameplay are no substitute for imagination". However, The A.V. Club gave it a D and stated that "almost everything about this movie cash-in is cheap and incompetent, from the short, forgettable levels to the poor control system to the hand-crampingly repetitive action".

As for the handhelds, the DS version was considered repetitive and hard to control, and the GBA version as a by-the-book platformer.
