= Nimrod (comics) =

- Nimrod; Art by Paco Medina and Juan Vlasco

Publication information
- Publisher: Marvel Comics
- First appearance: The Uncanny X-Men #191 (March 1985)
- Created by: Chris Claremont (writer); John Romita Jr. (artist)

In-story information
- Team affiliations: Purifiers; Sentinels; Project: Nimrod; Orchis
- Abilities: Superhuman strength, durability and regeneration; Energy projection; Computer interfacing; Shapeshifting; Teleportation

Nimrod is a fictional character appearing in American comic books published by Marvel Comics. The character first appeared in The Uncanny X-Men #191 (March 1985), and was created by writer Chris Claremont and artist John Romita Jr.

Hailing from the "Days of Future Past" timeline, Nimrod is a powerful, virtually indestructible descendant of the robotic mutant-hunting Sentinels. His name is derived from the biblical figure described in Genesis as a "mighty hunter".

== Publication history ==
The character was created by writer Chris Claremont and artist John Romita Jr., and first appeared in X-Men #191 (March 1985). Nimrod made subsequent appearances in Uncanny X-Men #193-194 (May–June 1985), #197 (September 1985), #208-209 (August–September 1986), #246-247 (July–August 1989), X-Force #35 (June 1994), Cable & Machine Man Annual #1 (Annual 1998), Mutant X #10 (July 1999), Weapon X: Days of Future Now #1 (September 2005), #4 (December 2005), New X-Men vol. 2 #22 (March 2006), #25-31 (June–December 2006), #36 (May 2007), The New Warriors vol. 4 #3 (October 2007), X-Factor vol. 3 #23 (November 2007), X-Force vol. 3 #1-2 (April–May 2008), and Powers of X #1-3 (July–August 2019).

Originally, Claremont intended to use Captain Britain villain Fury, but Alan Moore had ownership of the Marvel UK character and the possibility of litigation caused Claremont to create the similar character of Nimrod instead.

Nimrod received an entry in The Official Handbook of the Marvel Universe Deluxe Edition #9.

== Fictional character biography ==
Nimrod in Uncanny X-Men #194 (June 1985); art by John Romita Jr.

Nimrod is a mutant-hunting Sentinel from an alternative future and was created by the Sentinels ruling that timeline. Rachel Summers travels backwards in time to the present, but Nimrod follows. Although not capable of time travel by himself, he was transported back in time by Doctor Strange and Magik using their powers to change time to prevent Kulan Gath's occupation of New York. Nimrod saves the life of construction worker Jaime Rodriguez by killing a mugger, Gath's destined host, who would have otherwise killed Rodriguez. In gratitude, Rodriguez offers Nimrod a job and a home with his family, not realizing his true nature.

After gathering information about the timeline in which he finds himself, Nimrod eventually changes his prime directive from the extermination of all mutants, having determined that such widespread destruction is not necessary in this era, to only the extermination of mutants regarded as outlaws by the government, such as the X-Men.

Some time after this, Nimrod garners a reputation with the public of New York City as a heroic vigilante, assuming he is simply a man in powered armor. He also adopts the cover alias Nicholas Hunter, a more human personality as a construction worker.

While working on a construction site, Nimrod comes across a piece of the Sentinel Master Mold, who quickly takes over his body. The X-Men are initially hard pressed to defeat the reborn Mold, but Nimrod comes to their aid, claiming that he no longer views the X-Men or mutants as a threat. Nimrod asserts enough control over Mold to render it immobile, and even convinces it that it has become a mutant as well. Master Mold decides to self-destruct to fulfill its prime directive to exterminate mutants. The remains of Nimrod and Master Mold are pushed through the Siege Perilous, a mystical gateway that causes all who passed through it to be reborn with new bodies. The two Sentinels are merged into the being Bastion, who has no memory of his former existence.

William Stryker later finds Nimrod's damaged remains and uses his knowledge of the future to give him the appearance of precognition to his followers and to help plan an attack on the X-Men and other mutants. However, Nimrod alters his memories to facilitate his own escape, and Stryker is defeated.

In the series New X-Men, (Note: Formerly New X-Men: Academy X.) Nimrod searches for Forge, who he believes can repair his damaged body. Forge instead transfers Nimrod's programming into a new chassis under his control. Believing Forge to be in danger, the New X-Men travel to Forge's workshop to help. This eventually leads to Nimrod gaining control over his body and attacking Forge and the New X-Men. Nimrod is defeated when Surge overloads Nimrod's temporal unit, sending him back in time. Nimrod's encounter with Jamie Rodriguez plays out exactly as they had originally with its memory corrupted, resulting in its existence becoming a temporal paradox.

During the events of "Second Coming", Bastion unleashes an endless horde of Nimrods from an unknown future to destroy the X-Men. However, X-Force, Cypher, and Cable destroy the Master Mold controlling the Nimrods, while Bastion is destroyed by Hope Summers. Nimrod's chest and head are later shown to be exhibited in X-Force's headquarters. Deathlok identifies it as version 32.1 and the possibility for its future to come to be is 1.34%.

=== Dawn of X ===
In the series Dawn of X, "Nimrod the Lesser" is seen 90 years in the future, along with "Nimrod the Greater" seen 990 years in the future. It is soon revealed that a human coalition of scientists and espionage agents from various secret agencies have joined forces to form Orchis, an anti-mutant organization. Along with the former X-Men member Omega Sentinel, Orchis creates Mother Mold, a Master Mold capable of creating Master Mold Sentinels. After intel provided by Moira MacTaggert suggests that this event is the probable origin of the Nimrod Sentinels, the X-Men invade the Orchis forge and send Mother Mold plummeting into the sun.

At the behest of Charles Xavier and Magneto, Mystique returns for a final desperate mission in the Orchis Forge to detonate a mini-black hole bomb designed by Forge capable of annihilating the entire station. Her mission coincides with Alia Gregor preparing to resurrect her husband, Captain Erasmus Mendel, who was killed in the original Orchis raid, into the chassis of her newly constructed Sentinel prototype. The activation succeeds and the crystalline memory transfer is successful, but the Erasmus persona prototype immediately detects the disguised Mystique as a mutant and sacrifices itself to save the Orchis base by teleporting into space with the bomb she has triggered, leaving two emotionless duplicates without Erasmus' memory core yet uploaded to subdue Mystique before she can escape the station, and to protect Gregor. After killing Mystique, the Sentinel begins calling itself Nimrod, vowing to hunt down and kill all mutants. MacTaggert warns Xavier and Magneto that it will only be a few years before Nimrod evolves beyond Orchis's control.

== Powers and abilities ==
Nimrod is the most advanced form of Sentinel robot. Nimrod can convert his outward appearance to resemble that of an ordinary human being. Nimrod can also reconstruct himself so as to make improvements in his robotic form and internal systems that will make him a more formidable opponent. Even when smashed to pieces, Nimrod can reintegrate the portions of his body to become whole again. Physically, Nimrod is categorized in the "Official Handbook of the Marvel Universe" as possessing "Class 100" strength. This enabled him to engage the Juggernaut in hand-to-hand combat.

Nimrod contains highly advanced computer systems as well as scanning devices that make it possible for him to determine whether a human being is a superhuman or not; if they are, he can determine the nature of their superhuman abilities. Like present day Sentinels, Nimrod can neutralize an opponent's superhuman power once he has determined the nature of their powers.

Nimrod is capable of projecting energy blasts, magnetic energy to levitate material, create force fields, and can teleport. Nimrod has a weakness for elemental attacks such as lightning or extreme cold.

== Other versions ==
In the Ultimate Marvel universe, Sentinels resembling Nimrod are developed by the United States government after the Ultimatum Wave. They are eventually infused with the brain-patterns of William Stryker Jr.

== In other media ==
=== Television ===
- Nimrod appears in X-Men: The Animated Series, voiced by Dan Hennessey. This version is an enforcer from a Sentinel-dominated future led by Master Mold.
  - Nimrod makes a non-speaking cameo appearance in the X-Men '97 episode "Tolerance is Extinction". His remains infected Richard Gilberti, leading to Bastion being born a human-Sentinel hybrid.
- Nimrod makes a non-speaking cameo appearance in the X-Men: Evolution series finale "Ascension".

=== Film ===
Nimrod serves as inspiration for the Mark-X Sentinels of X-Men: Days of Future Past. Similar to Nimrod, the Sentinels originate from a dystopian future and can alter their bodies to mimic and counter mutant abilities.

=== Video games ===
- Nimrod appears as a recurring boss in X-Men (1992).
- Nimrod appears as a boss in X-Men: Gamesmaster's Legacy.
- Nimrod and a Nimrod Series MK IV Sentinel appear in Marvel: Avengers Alliance.
- Nimrod appears as a playable character in Marvel Contest of Champions.
- Nimrod appears as a boss in The Uncanny X-Men - Days Of Future Past.
- Nimrod appears as an alternate skin for a Sentinel in Marvel: Future Fight.
- Nimrod appears in Marvel Snap.

=== Miscellaneous ===
Nimrod received a figure in the Marvel Legends toyline.
