= Sentinel (comics) =

Mutant-hunting robot in Marvel Comics

Sentinels
- The Sentinels. Art by Alex Ross.

Publication information
- Publisher: Marvel Comics
- First appearance: The X-Men #14 (November 1965)
- Created by: Stan Lee; Jack Kirby

In-story information
- Base(s): Sentinel Headquarters, New York
- Member(s): Nimrod; Master Mold; Bastion; Prime Sentinels; Wild Sentinels

The Sentinels are a group of mutant-hunting robots appearing in American comic books published by Marvel Comics. They first appeared in The X-Men #14 (November 1965), written by Stan Lee and illustrated by Jack Kirby. The original Sentinels were created by Bolivar Trask, and they are typically depicted as antagonists to the X-Men.

The Sentinels played a large role in several X-Men animated series and have been featured in a number of X-Men video games. The Sentinels are featured prominently in the 2014 film X-Men: Days of Future Past, and made brief appearances in the 2006 film X-Men: The Last Stand and the 2016 film X-Men: Apocalypse. In 2009, the Sentinels were ranked by IGN as the 38th Greatest Comic Book Villain of All Time.

== Publication history ==
The Sentinels' debut in The X-Men #14 (November 1965). Art by Jack Kirby.

The Sentinels first appeared in The X-Men #14 (November 1965), and were created by writer Stan Lee and artist/co-writer Jack Kirby.

Sentinels are programmed to locate mutants and capture or kill them. Though several types of Sentinels have been introduced, the typical Sentinel is three stories tall and is capable of flight, projecting energy blasts, and detecting mutants.

== Characteristics ==
Sentinels are designed to hunt mutants. While many are capable of tactical thought, only a handful are self-aware.

Sentinels are technologically advanced, and have exhibited a wide variety of abilities. They are armed (primarily with energy weapons and restraining devices), capable of flight, and can detect mutants at long range. They possess vast physical strength, and their bodies are highly resistant to damage. Some are able to alter their physical forms or re-assemble and reactivate themselves after they have been destroyed.

Some Sentinels can learn from their experiences, developing their defenses during an engagement. Several groups of Sentinels have been created or led by a single massive Sentinel called Master Mold. Some Sentinels are also equipped with an inconspicuous logic loop in case they should go rogue to convince them that they are mutants.

== Types of Sentinels ==
Evolution of the Sentinel. Art by Ardian Syaf.

- Mark I and Master Mold - Created by Bolivar Trask. First appeared in X-Men #14. Trask sacrificed himself to destroy the Master Mold.
- Mark II - Created by Larry Trask. This model was capable of adapting to and counteracting superpowers almost instantly. First appeared in X-Men #57.
- Mark III - Created by Steven Lang and Project: Armageddon, secretly funded by Edward Buckman and the Council of the Chosen.
- Mark IV - Created by Sebastian Shaw.
- Mark V - Created by Shaw for Project Wideawake.
- Mark VI - Created by Shaw Industries for Project Wideawake and used by Onslaught.
- Mark VII - Created by Shaw Industries. They were experimental and remote controlled.
- Nimrod - A prototype Super Sentinel that arrived from the "Days of Future Past" timeline and was later reactivated by William Stryker.
- Prime Sentinels - Bastion's humanoid Sentinels.
- Wild Sentinels - Sentinels built in secret in Ecuador, activated and used by Cassandra Nova in the genocide of Genosha.
- Mark VIII / Sentinel Squad O*N*E - Sentinels designed by Stark Enterprises which, unlike other Sentinels, requires a human pilot.
- Bio-Sentinels - Human mutant corpse infected by a technological virus created by Kaga. They come with the innate capacity of weaponizing bio-technological apparati such as Brood-designed missiles as a means of offense.
- Stark Sentinels MK I - The Stark Sentinels debuted during the AXIS storyline. While morally inverted, Tony Stark created a model of adamantium-constructed Sentinels outfitted with Pym Particle technology.
- Mother Mold - A Sentinel created by Orchis that is designed to create Master Mold units.
- X-Sentinels - A modern Sentinel created by Doctor Stasis.
- Stark Sentinel MK II - A version of the Stark Sentinel created by Feilong.
- Fireteam - Cyborg Sentinels created by Larry Trask using nanites harvested from Juston Seyfert.
- Bloodhounds - The Bloodhounds are captured dogs who were turned into Sentinel cyborgs. They were designed to hunt mutants, but malfunctioned and began attacking humans as well.

=== Related mutant-hunting creations ===
The X-Men battle Sentinels in X-Men: Schism #1 (July 2011). Art by Carlos Pacheco and Cam Smith.

- Tri-Sentinel - A giant-sized, six-armed, three-faced combination of three Sentinels created by Loki. Life Foundation attempted to reprogram the Tri-Sentinel but as that attempt failed along with the fail-safe Spider-Man and Nova had to destroy the Tri-Sentinel.
- Soviet Sentinels - Created by the Soviet Union and later purchased by Cuban government officials.
- Super-Sentinels - Using Nano-Sentinel technology, Weapon Plus created artificially evolved superhumans. Three of the creations were chosen to form the mutant-hunting Super-Sentinels: Huntsman, Fantomex and Ultimaton, who were intended to be presented to the public as superheroes to make the extermination of mutantkind look "like a Saturday morning cartoon".
- Colcord's Sentinels - Several Boxbots were created by Madison Jeffries (aka Box) to serve Weapon X.
- Hardaway - A cyborg created at Camp Hayden who called himself a Bio-Sentinel.
- Juston Seyfert's Sentinel: A rebuilt Sentinel that was reprogrammed to obey Juston Seyfert. In Avengers Arena, the Sentinel is destroyed and Juston apparently killed. Juston is later revealed to have been revived after his Sentinel infused his body with nanotechnology, transforming him into a Sentinel cyborg.
- Sentinaughts - One of the types of sentient robots who live in the free robot city of The Core, Sentinaughts are apparently based on the Sentinel design. They vary in size from roughly human to the large stature of traditional Sentinels.
- Nano-Sentinel - Microscopic Sentinel type of tech created by Cassandra Nova and implemented in various ways by other users. They attach themselves to the brains of humans and mutants alike.
- Adamantium Cyborgs - Near-fully mechanical mutant hunter killers refitted by Weapon X with the titular metal as an endoskeleton using sentinel based nanotech. Coming in numerous alphabetical categorical batches, these bionic weapons can shed their skin revealing a murderous automaton with the abilities of various X-Men heroes and villains integrated into them.
- Core/Central Command - A biotech Master Mold variant behind the design parameters of the new Prime Sentinels.
- Box Sentinels - Smaller and faster Sentinels based on the Box technology created by a joint venture between Department H and Orchis to track down and capture mutants in Canada.

== In other media ==
=== Television ===
- A Sentinel appears in the Spider-Man and His Amazing Friends episode "A Firestar Is Born" via a flashback.
- The Sentinels appear in X-Men: The Animated Series, voiced by David Fox. These versions were created by Bolivar Trask and Henry Peter Gyrich.
- The Sentinels appear in the Spider-Man: The Animated Series episode "The Mutant Agenda" as a simulation of the Danger Room.
- The Sentinels appear in X-Men: Evolution. These versions are more heavily armed than their comic book counterparts. In the episode "Day of Reckoning", a prototype attacks the X-Men, resulting in mutants becoming public knowledge. In the episode "Uprising", S.H.I.E.L.D. uses three upgraded models against Apocalypse.
- A Sentinel appears in the Robot Chicken episode "Sausage Fest".
- The Sentinels appear in Wolverine and the X-Men, voiced by Jim Ward.
- Alternate timeline versions of the Sentinels appear in The Super Hero Squad Show episode "Days, Nights, and Weekends of Future Past! (Six Against Infinity Part 2)", voiced by Tom Kenny. These versions were created to defend Super Hero City in a possible future where the Scarlet Witch is a dictator.
- A Sentinel appears in Marvel Anime: X-Men as a simulation of the Danger Room.
- A Sentinel appears in the Ultimate Spider-Man episode "Game Over" as a part of Arcade's Madland.
- A Sentinel appears in Marvel Disk Wars: The Avengers.
- The Sentinels appear in The Gifted. These versions are small spider-like robots created by Trask Industries to withstand various hazardous environments and forms of attack as well as adapt quickly to damage taken.
- The Sentinels appear in X-Men '97, voiced by Eric Bauza and Theo James.

=== Film ===
The Sentinels as they appear in X-Men: Days of Future Past (2014); the Mark I model in 1973 (left) and the Mark X model in 2023 (right)

- A Sentinel appears in X-Men: The Last Stand (2006) as a Danger Room simulation.
- Two variations of the Sentinels appear in X-Men: Days of Future Past (2014). The prototype Mark I Sentinels were designed by Legacy Effects with Digital Domain building digital models based on a full-scale practical model while the future Mark X variants, based on Nimrod Sentinels, were computer graphics made by Moving Picture Company. In the film, the prototypes are said to be built using space-age polymers and are equipped with chest-mounted vent-like structures that grant flight capabilities as well as arm-mounted Gatling guns while the future Sentinels are smaller, sleeker, and built with adaptive mechanical scales, hands that can reform into blades, and emitters in their heads capable of firing energy beams. This version of the Sentinel program was originally created in the 1970s, with Bolivar Trask experimenting on mutants to accelerate his research, though he found little success in gaining support for his project. After Raven assassinated Trask in 1973 (which was the first time she killed and how she truly became Mystique), the U.S. government approved the Sentinel program, captured her, and experimented on her to give the Sentinels the ability to adapt to and utilize any mutant power. However, the Sentinels subsequently target humans due to their potential for having mutant descendants, culminating in a dystopian future where most of humanity and mutant-kind are nearly extinct by 2023. After Kitty Pryde uses her ability to project the minds of others into their past selves on Logan to rally Charles Xavier and Erik Lehnsherr's younger selves and avert Trask's assassination, the pair eventually succeed, causing the U.S. government to realize that not all mutants are a threat to humanity and abandon the Sentinel program.
- The Sentinels make a cameo appearance in X-Men: Apocalypse (2016) as Danger Room simulations.
- Sentinels appear in films set in the Marvel Cinematic Universe (MCU).
  - In Deadpool & Wolverine, Deadpool and Wolverine use a flying Sentinel's foot to escape from Cassandra Nova and her minions.
  - Sentinels will appear in Avengers: Doomsday (2026).

=== Video games ===
- The Sentinels appear in X-Men (1992).
- The Sentinels appear in Spider-Man and the X-Men in Arcade's Revenge.
- The Sentinels appear as bosses in X-Men: Mutant Apocalypse via the Genosha stage.
- The Sentinels appear in X-Men 2: Clone Wars.
- A non-standard 10' tall Sentinel appears as a playable character in X-Men: Children of the Atom.
- A non-standard 10' tall Sentinel appears as a secret assist character in Marvel vs. Capcom: Clash of Super Heroes.
- A non-standard 10' tall Sentinel appears as a playable character in Marvel vs. Capcom 2: New Age of Heroes.
- The Sentinels appear in X-Men: Mutant Academy.
- The Sentinels appear as background characters in X-Men: Mutant Academy 2.
- The Sentinels appear in X-Men: Next Dimension, with a male and female Prime Sentinel available as playable characters.
- The Sentinels appear in X-Men Legends, voiced by Scott MacDonald.
- The Sentinels appear in X-Men Legends II: Rise of Apocalypse.
- The Sentinels appear in X-Men: The Official Game, voiced by Robin Atkin Downes. This version of the Sentinel program includes a small flight-capable model and a walking behemoth.
- The Sentinels appear in X-Men Origins: Wolverine, with a Mark I model appearing as a boss.
- A non-standard 10' tall Sentinel appears as an unlockable playable character in Marvel vs. Capcom 3: Fate of Two Worlds and Ultimate Marvel vs Capcom 3, voiced again by Jim Ward. In its arcade mode ending, it uploads Master Mold's program into Galactus's warship with the intention of killing mutants and humanity via Galactus-inspired Sentinels.
- The Sentinels appear in X-Men Destiny.
- The Sentinels appear in Marvel: Avengers Alliance. This version of the Sentinel program includes several Sentinel models named after the Titans. Additionally, the Brotherhood of Mutants employ M-Series Sentinels while the Hellfire Club hired the Crimson Dynamo to build Sentinels loyal to them.
- The Sentinels appear in Marvel Heroes.
- The Sentinels appear in Deadpool.
- The Sentinels appear in Lego Marvel Super Heroes, voiced by Stephen Stanton. Additionally, a Mini-Sentinel appears as an unlockable playable character.
- A Sentinel appears as a playable character in Marvel: Future Fight.
- The Sentinels appear as playable and non-playable characters in Marvel Contest of Champions.
- The Sentinels appear in Marvel Ultimate Alliance 3: The Black Order alongside a variation called the Infinity Sentinel as a boss, both voiced again by Jim Ward.
- The Sentinels appear as a landmark in Fortnite Battle Royale.
- The Sentinels appear in Marvel Snap.
- The Sentinels appear in Marvel's Wolverine, with a prototype model serving as boss. These versions were created by Bolivar Trask to hunt mutants before being repurposed by Nathaniel Essex to locate and capture dormant mutants.

=== Merchandise ===
- A Sentinel figure was released in Toy Biz's X-Men Classics line.
- A Sentinel "Build-A-Figure", based on the "Here Comes Tomorrow" incarnation, was released in wave ten of the Marvel Legends line.
- Two Sentinel figures was released in Hasbro's Marvel Universe line.
- Two Sentinel figures and a statue were released in the Marvel Minimates line, with the second being based on its appearance in Marvel vs. Capcom 3: Fate of Two Worlds.
- A Sentinel figure was released in Lego's "X-Men vs. the Sentinel" set.
- A twenty-six inch Sentinel figure was announced as part of Hasbro's HasLab crowdfunding releases.

=== Music ===
In 2020, Brooklyn rapper Magneto Dayo unveiled "The Sentinels", a project that gained viral traction on Instagram reels in 2024, amassing over 5 million plays.
