= Purifiers (Marvel Comics) =

Fictional characters

The Purifiers / Stryker Crusade

Publication information
- Publisher: Marvel Comics
- First appearance: Marvel Graphic Novel #5: X-Men: God Loves, Man Kills (1982)
- Created by: Chris Claremont; Brent Anderson

In-story information
- Type of organization: Terrorist
- Leader(s): William Stryker (founder); Matthew Risman (successor); Bastion; Jason Stryker (successor)
- Agent(s): Anne; Nimrod; Reverend Craig

The Purifiers, also known as the Stryker Crusade, are a fictional paramilitary/terrorist organization appearing in American comic books published by Marvel Comics. They are usually depicted as enemies of the X-Men. Created by writer Chris Claremont and artist Brent Anderson, they first appeared in the 1982 graphic novel X-Men: God Loves, Man Kills.

A force of Christian fundamentalists led by Reverend William Stryker, the Purifiers see themselves in a holy war against mutants, believing them to be the children of the Devil and thus worthy of extermination. The Purifiers made only sporadic appearances since their first appearance, but returned to prominence in the 2000s, when they became prominent antagonists in the series New X-Men and X-Force, and played a major role in the 2007 - 2008 crossover storyline X-Men: Messiah Complex.

The Purifiers appear in the television series The Gifted as antagonists to the mutants, although not a wide organization like the comics. They are led by failed Senator Benedict Ryan, portrayed by Peter Gallagher.

== Fictional organization biography ==
In the 1982 graphic novel God Loves, Man Kills, the Purifiers are first seen aiding their leader, William Stryker, in his plans to annihilate the mutant race. The Purifiers work to fulfill many of Stryker's goals, abducting Professor X and several of the X-Men, killing mutant children, and defending Stryker's church against the X-Men and Magneto. Eventually, one of the guards, horrified by Stryker's attempt to kill Kitty Pryde, shoots him. With Stryker arrested, the Purifiers disband.

Following his release from prison, Stryker discovers Nimrod, a time-traveling Sentinel from the future, in his church. Accessing Nimrod's memory core, Stryker sees the effects of "Decimation" months before M-Day occurs, enabling him to plan a renewed campaign against mutants. When M-Day strikes and over ninety-nine percent of the world's mutants are rendered powerless, the Purifiers attack the Xavier Institute and kill over forty-five students. After Stryker is killed by Elixir, the Purifiers retreat, with Matthew Risman taking control of the group.

During the Messiah Complex storyline, the Purifiers are one of the three factions, along with the X-Men and Marauders, searching for Hope Summers, the first mutant born since M-Day. All three groups are alerted to Hope's birth simultaneously and head for the remote Alaskan village where she had been born. The Purifiers beat both the X-Men and the Marauders to the scene and kill every child in the city to make sure that Hope does not survive. The Purifiers are then attacked by the Marauders, who killed several of their members. By the time the X-Men arrive, the Purifiers and the Marauders have both left, with Hope's whereabouts unknown.

Shortly after the events of Messiah Complex and the dissolution of the X-Men, the Purifiers recover Bastion's head and place it onto Nimrod's body, bringing Bastion back to life. In addition, the Purifiers recover the corpses of Graydon Creed, Steven Lang, Bolivar Trask, and William Stryker and resurrect them using samples of the Technarchy, recruiting them into the group.

The Purifiers reappear in the series All-New X-Men, where they target an amnesiac X-23. It is later revealed that William Stryker's son Jason Stryker, who was believed to have been killed as an infant by his father for being a mutant, is still alive. Jason goes on to succeed his father as the leader of the Purifiers.

== Membership ==
The Purifiers were founded and initially led by William Stryker, with Matthew Risman succeeding following the former's death. Jason Stryker later assumed leadership of the Purifiers. Bastion was recruited into the Purifiers after they recovered his head and resurrected him. Cameron Hodge, Donald Pierce, Bolivar Trask, Graydon Creed, and Steven Lang were resurrected by the Purifiers and recruited into their ranks. Reverend Craig, a pastor and Wolfsbane's father, was a member of the Purifiers until he is killed by his child. The Choir are a subgroup of the Purifiers who were given techno-organic wings similar to those of Archangel. Other agents of the Purifiers include Anne, Benedict Ryan and Adam Harkins.

== Powers and abilities ==
Being baseline humans, the Purifiers possess no superhuman abilities, relying on superior technology in their genocidal campaign against mutants. The Purifiers possess a variety of deadly armaments and munitions, some more conventional weapons like assault rifles, flamethrowers, and anti-tank rockets, as well as more advanced and expensive equipment like vibranium-based weaponry. The group also used the knowledge contained within Nimrod's memory banks to great effect, although that advantage was lost when Nimrod reactivated and destroyed its keepers, before being defeated by the New X-Men.

The Purifiers are all highly trained, and have been shown to be capable of holding their own against the X-Men. The group also possesses links to allied churches all over the world, and their membership includes corporate elites, political figures and intelligence personnel. This allows the Purifiers to avoid reprisals from law-enforcement agencies for their terrorist actions.

== In other media ==
=== Television ===
- The Purifiers appear in The Gifted, consisting of Benedict Ryan (portrayed by Peter Gallagher) and Jace Turner (portrayed by Coby Bell).
- The Purifiers appear in the X-Men '97 episode "Danger.exe", with Anne voiced by Adrienne Barbeau.

=== Film ===
Reverend Craig appears in The New Mutants, portrayed by Happy Anderson.

=== Video games ===
- The Purifiers appear in X-Men: Destiny.
- The Purifiers appear in Marvel Heroes.
