= Steven Lang (character) =

Fictional comic character

- Art by Ibrahim Roberson and Lan Medina

Publication information
- Publisher: Marvel Comics
- First appearance: The X-Men #96 (December 1975)
- Created by: Chris Claremont; Dave Cockrum

In-story information
- Species: Human Cyborg
- Team affiliations: Purifiers; Human Council; Phalanx; Project: Armageddon; Department of Defense
- Notable aliases: Master Mold, Conscience
- Abilities: Cybernetic organism

Steven Lang (sometimes spelled Stephen Lang) is a supervillain appearing in American comic books published by Marvel Comics. He is a manufacturer of the mutant-hunting Sentinels. He first appeared in The X-Men #96 (December 1975).

== Fictional character biography ==
Dr. Steven Lang is a pioneer in the field of robotics and genetic mutation who hates mutants. An employee of the U.S. government, he is placed in charge of a federal investigation into the origin of genetic mutation. He plans to use his talents to create an army of mutant hunting robots to kill all mutants. To this end, he seeks to get the government to endorse and financially support his operations.

Lang begins by targeting mutant criminals, such as Mesmero. He claims possession of Bolivar Trask's wrecked Sentinel base's resources and is backed by Ned Buckman and the "Council of the Chosen", the secret group in control of the New York Branch of the Hellfire Club prior to Sebastian Shaw's takeover.

Lang desires to defeat his main targets, the X-Men, so he creates the X-Sentinels, android doubles of Professor X and the original X-Men. However, his androids manage only inferior imitations of the X-Men's powers, and are easily defeated by the real X-Men. Jean Grey telekinetically forces Lang to crash his mini-gunship, leaving him in a coma with severe brain damage.

However, his brain is used as a template for the minds of two Sentinels, Conscience and the second Master Mold, which are both destroyed in an attempt to release a virus which would have killed all mutants and roughly 97% of normal humans on Earth.

Lang returns as a member of the Phalanx, a group of humans who had been transformed into techno-organic human-alien hybrids. The transformation process restores Lang's mind, and he becomes the Phalanx's leader. Lang is the only one within the Phalanx to retain his individual human identity. While he is ardent in his desire to see mutants eradicated, he comes to realize the Phalanx are a danger to humans as well. He conspires with the X-Men to destroy the Phalanx citadel on Earth, following which he is dragged to his apparent death by his lieutenant Cameron Hodge.

Lang's corpse is exhumed by the Purifiers and reanimated by Bastion using the Technarchy. He joins a group formed by the foremost anti-mutant leaders under Bastion's control. During the Second Coming storyline, Lang and Graydon Creed are killed by Hope Summers.

== Powers and abilities ==
As a normal human being, Steven Lang had no superhuman powers. However, he was a genius and pioneer in the field of robotics, with adequate financial resources to fund his operations. As a member of the Phalanx, he had all of the characteristics of a techno-organic life form: enhanced strength, durability, and agility, ability to re-shape corporeal form at will, and to infect other beings with the techno-organic virus and control infected beings.

== Other versions ==
In the 2009-2010 miniseries X-Men Noir, Lang is a fictional character and lead for Bolivar Trask's pulp sci-fi series, "The Sentinels", who seeks to protect humanity from mutants.
