= Prime Sentinel =

Fictional comic book androids

Prime Sentinels
- The Prime Sentinels attack. Cover to X-Men (vol. 2) #65. Art by Carlos Pacheco.

Publication information
- Publisher: Marvel Comics
- First appearance: X-Men (vol. 2) #64 (April 1997)
- Created by: Scott Lobdell; Carlos Pacheco

In-story information
- Member(s): Agent Boyd; Agent Mathers; Arvell; Curtis; Felipe; Helmut; Mustang; Number 5 Sanjit Shaara/Unit 3 Saroyan; Karima Shapandar; Tanya; Ginny Mahoney/Unit #1031; Daria

Prime Sentinels are an advanced type of fictional Sentinel appearing in American comic books published by Marvel Comics. They are depicted as humans transformed into cyborgs via nanotechnology. Like the original Sentinels, they are typically depicted as antagonists to the X-Men.

== Creation ==
The Prime Sentinels were created when Bastion initiates the "Operation: Zero Tolerance" program. These Sentinels are humans fitted with cybernetic nanotech implants which, upon activation, transform them into armored beings with powerful weapons systems. The Sentinels are set up as sleeper agents, unaware of their natures until a signal from the Operation: Zero Tolerance base activates their programming. Bastion uses the Sentinels to capture Professor X for his own purposes, as well as attack various mutants associated with the X-Men across the country.

== Powers and abilities ==
Prime Sentinels are equipped with several technological enhancements which give them flight, enhanced physical abilities, optic lasers, and the ability to dampen or disrupt the powers of mutants around them. On board scanning and homing sensors which enable them to detect mutants within their vicinity. Omega Prime Sentinels, like Karima Shapandar, are equipped with mechanical regeneration coupled with some level of electromagnetic powers. Omega Sentinels also possess adaptive countermeasure facilities which enable them to create weaponry tailored to counter specific mutants.

== In other media ==
- In 2020, two Prime Sentinel figures were released as part of the Marvel Legends line.
- The Prime Sentinels appear in X-Men '97. These versions were transformed by Mister Sinister's techno-organic virus and can transform into a variation of a normal Sentinel.
