= Jason Stryker =

Publication information
- Publisher: Marvel Comics
- First appearance: Marvel Graphic Novel #5 (January 1983)
- Created by: Chris Claremont (writer); Brent Anderson (artist)

In-story information
- Species: Human mutant
- Team affiliations: Purifiers
- Abilities: Light emission

Jason Stryker is a character appearing in American comic books published by Marvel Comics. He is usually depicted as the mutant son of William Stryker and as an enemy of the X-Men.

== Publication history ==
Created by writer Chris Claremont and artist Brent Anderson, he first appeared in Marvel Graphic Novel #5 (1983). The character was later re-introduced in All-New X-Men #19 (2013) and officially named Jason Stryker.

== Fictional character biography ==
At the time Jason's mother, Marcy Stryker, got pregnant, his father William was still a colonel and stationed on a nuclear testing facility. After the couple crashed their car in the Nevada desert, Marcy went into labor, forcing Stryker to deliver their baby. Marcy fell unconscious in the process and, upon waking up, she asked if the baby was fine, only for William to snap her neck. William saw his son's birth as a sign from God, causing him to turn into a religious fanatic and aim to commit genocide against mutants. However, Jason was kept alive and Stryker resorted to A.I.M. to treat his son's mutant condition.

As an adult, Jason joins the Purifiers to continue his father's work and faces the time-displaced past version of the original X-Men. Jason is defeated and arrested by S.H.I.E.L.D.

== Powers and abilities ==
Jason Stryker possesses the ability to project a blinding white light from his body that is powerful enough to knock several people unconscious. His mutation was initially unstable, as he was born deformed. A.I.M. alleviated Stryker's condition, though with side effects such as chronic headaches and insomnia.

== In other media ==
=== Film ===
- Jason Stryker appears in X2, portrayed by Michael Reid McKay (normal form) and by Keely Purvis (illusionary form). This version is able to project illusions and was previously lobotomized, leaving him mute and docile. William Stryker utilizes secretions from Jason's brain to control the minds of other mutants.
- Jason Stryker makes a cameo appearance in X-Men Origins: Wolverine.

=== Video games ===
Jason Stryker appears in X-Men: The Official Game, voiced by Steve Blum as an adult and by Grey DeLisle as a child.
