= Bastion (comics) =

Sebastion Gilberti Bastion
- Art from the variant cover for X-Force (vol. 3) #6 (2008). Art by Clayton Crain.

Publication information
- Publisher: Marvel Comics
- First appearance: X-Men (vol. 2) #52 (May 1996)
- Created by: Scott Lobdell; Pascual Ferry

In-story information
- Alter ego: Sebastion Gilberti
- Species: Android
- Team affiliations: Purifiers; Friends of Humanity; Operation: Zero Tolerance; Humanity's Last Stand
- Notable aliases: Master Mold, Nimrod, Arnold Rodriguez, Template, The Oracle
- Abilities: Immunity to telepathic probes and mutant abilities; Adaptation; Technoforming; Ability to turn people into Prime Sentinels; Command of other Sentinels; Energy manipulation; Teleportation; Chronokinesis; Technopathy; Superhuman strength and durability; Flight

Bastion (Sebastion Gilberti) is a supervillain appearing in American comic books published by Marvel Comics. The character was created by Scott Lobdell and Pascual Ferry, and first made a cameo appearance in X-Men (vol. 2) #52 (May 1996) while his first full appearance was in The Uncanny X-Men #333 (June 1996).

== Fictional character biography ==
=== Operation: Zero Tolerance ===
Bastion is introduced as Sebastion Gilberti, the head of the international anti-mutant strike force Operation: Zero Tolerance (OZT). After taking control of the Xavier Institute, Bastion obtains the Xavier Protocols, a list of files containing information on killing the X-Men. Bastion also succeeds in capturing Jubilee to take to the OZT base in New Mexico.

Bastion develops the Prime Sentinels, who are humans transformed by nanotechnology. After learning of the Prime Sentinels' nature, Robert Kelly and Henry Peter Gyrich convince the President to suspend Bastion's operations. Bastion is captured by S.H.I.E.L.D. with help from Iceman.

=== Origin ===
While in government custody, more mysteries surrounding Bastion are discovered. Bastion escapes custody and returns to the home of his adoptive mother Rose Gilberti who the authorities accidentally kill which gets Bastion enraged and returns to the former OZT facility. Bastion makes contact with the version of Master Mold that helped create the Prime Sentinels and drains the unit's energy, which transforms him into an entity resembling Nimrod.

This transformation unblocks Bastion's memories, revealing that he is the combined form of Master Mold and the futuristic Sentinel Nimrod who were reborn after passing through the Siege Perilous and left with no memory of their previous lives. Bastion was eventually found by Rose who took him in and taught him human kindness. Bastion is returned to government custody, only to be killed by Apocalypse's Horseman of Death.

=== Template ===
Bastion's remains are found by former S.H.I.E.L.D. agent Mainspring, who studies and destroys Phalanx technology.

=== X-Force ===
Following the events of Messiah Complex, the Purifiers attack a S.H.I.E.L.D. installation and recover Bastion's head. The Purifiers attach the head to the body of Nimrod, resurrecting Bastion. Immediately after his activation, Bastion alerts the Purifiers to the presence of the new X-Force. After accessing Nimrod's database, Bastion concludes that the X-Men are the greatest mutant threat to the Purifiers' objectives and that there is no terrestrial force in existence that could guarantee the elimination of the X-Men. Bastion sends the Purifiers to retrieve Magus from the bottom of the ocean, believing that he can assist them in their cause.

It is later revealed that what Bastion discovered was not the real Magus, but one of his offspring in a mindless state. Bastion infects Donald Pierce and the Leper Queen, as well as the deceased Cameron Hodge, Steven Lang, Bolivar Trask, Graydon Creed, and William Stryker with the Transmode Virus, declaring them to be the future of humanity and the end of mutantkind.

=== Second Coming ===
Bastion is the primary antagonist in the X-Men: Second Coming storyline. He is seen with Lang, Hodge, Trask, Stryker and Creed, stating that their forces are assembled and at his disposal. Bastion tells them that the Mutant Messiah has returned and gives them orders to kill. Bastion attempts to kill Hope Summers on his own, but he is confronted by Rogue and destroyed by Hope.

=== X-Men Blue ===
Bastion is later revealed to have survived by transporting himself to the future, but was severely damaged by Hope's attack. Arriving when mutants were being faced with extinction due to the Terrigen Mist cloud, Bastion dedicates himself to protecting mutants, assembling, and reprogramming a wave of Sentinels. He eventually returns to the present and is confronted by the time-displaced X-Men, who learn that Bastion's actual goal is to preserve mutants until their population rises to a level where he can destroy them all himself.

In the aftermath of the Secret Empire storyline, Bastion works with Miss Sinister, Emma Frost, and Havok to use Mothervine, a drug that accelerates and activates mutation, on a global scale. After Sebastian Shaw fails to kill Magneto to gain a role in the Mothervine plot, Bastion unleashes a wave of Prime Sentinels to release Mothervine under Havok's order.

Thanks to Bastion's efforts, both humans and mutants experience accelerated mutations through exposure to Mothervine. A group of mutants, led by Polaris, infiltrate the Mothervine group's hideout, with Bastion detecting their presence and alerting the rest of the group. Frost, disillusioned by the Mothervine plot, frees Polaris's team, who make their way to the inner circle's meeting room. Bastion is caught off guard by the arrival of Xorn, who absorbs him into a wormhole and seemingly destroys them both.

== In other media ==
=== Television ===
Bastion appears in the first season of X-Men '97, voiced by Theo James as an adult and Kari Wahlgren as a child. This version is a human who was born a cyborg.

=== Video games ===
- Bastion appears as a boss and a playable character in X-Men: Next Dimension, voiced by Don Morrow.
- Bastion appears as a boss in X-Men Legends II: Rise of Apocalypse, voiced by Alastair Duncan.
- Bastion appears as a boss in X-Men: Destiny, voiced by Keith Szarabajka.
- Bastion appears as a boss in Marvel: Avengers Alliance.
- Bastion appears as a playable character in Marvel Contest of Champions.
- Bastion appears as a card in Marvel Snap.
