= Bolivar Trask =

Fictional comic book character

- Bolivar Trask in Professor Xavier and the X-Men #16 (February 1997). Art by Nick Gnazzo.

Publication information
- Publisher: Marvel Comics
- First appearance: The X-Men #14 (November 1965)
- Created by: Stan Lee (writer); Jack Kirby (artist)

In-story information
- Full name: Bolivar Trask
- Species: Human
- Place of origin: New York City
- Team affiliations: Sentinels; Purifiers; Control
- Abilities: Genius-level intellect

Bolivar Trask is a fictional character appearing in American comic books published by Marvel Comics. He is a military scientist whose company Trask Industries is well-known as the creator of the Sentinels. He is also the father of Larry Trask and Madame Sanctity.

The character has appeared in several media adaptations outside of comics, including animated series and video games. Peter Dinklage portrayed Bolivar Trask in the 2014 film X-Men: Days of Future Past.

== Publication history ==
Bolivar Trask was created by writer Stan Lee and artist/co-writer Jack Kirby, and first appeared in The X-Men #14 (November 1965).

== Fictional character biography ==
Bolivar Trask was an anthropologist and robotics mogul who saw the rise of mutants as a threat to humanity. He was the father of Larry Trask, ironically revealed to be a precognitive mutant. Bolivar had realized this and gave his son a medallion which suppresses his power. His other child, Tanya, turns out to also be a mutant when she vanishes after her abilities cause her to travel through time. She is rescued by Rachel Summers in the far future and joins the Askani as Madame Sanctity.

Trask devotes his company's resources towards the creation of robotic guardians designed to combat mutant abilities, known as the Sentinels. Unaware of this, Charles Xavier invites Trask for a public debate on human/mutant relations. Despite Xavier making a strong case for mutants being closer to humanity than first believed, Trask remains steadfast in his beliefs. Trask and his scientists had apparently created a too adaptive, open-ended tactical/strategic programming, and as a result the Sentinels turn against him, claiming that they are superior to humans. The Sentinels leave with Trask and bring him to his first creation, Master Mold, who orders him to construct more Sentinels.

To stop the Sentinels, Xavier summons the X-Men. The X-Men fight the Sentinels, but Beast is captured. To reveal the X-Men's secrets, the Sentinels tell Trask to use a device to read Beast's mind. Trask discovers that the X-Men were mutants protecting humanity and realizes that he had been wrong. He helps the X-Men defeat the Sentinels by sacrificing himself to destroy the Sentinels' base.

In X-Force, Bastion resurrects Bolivar Trask using a Technarch to be part of a team of mutant killers. As the inventor of the Sentinels, Trask has the highest record of mutant kills: 16 million. Trask later kills himself after escaping Bastion's control.

== Other versions ==
=== Age of Apocalypse ===
An alternate universe version of Bolivar Trask from Earth-295 appears in Age of Apocalypse. This version is married to Moira Kinross and worked with her to create the Sentinels and combat Apocalypse.

=== Civil War: House of M ===
An alternate universe version of Bolivar Trask from Earth-58163 appears in Civil War: House of M. This version is the Vice President of the United States and created the Sentinels to combat Magneto, who later kills him.

=== X-Men Noir ===
An alternate universe version of Bolivar Trask from Earth-90214 appears in X-Men Noir. This version is a scientist and science fiction writer.

=== Ultimate Marvel ===
An alternate universe version of Bolivar Trask appears in Ultimate X-Men. This version created the Sentinels to combat Magneto. Following the failure of the Sentinels, Trask is employed by the Fenris twins to continue building Sentinels and attacking mutants. Horrified by his own actions, Trask allows himself to be killed in an explosion.

== In other media ==
=== Television ===
- Bolivar Trask appears in X-Men: The Animated Series, voiced by Brett Halsey. This version collaborated with Henry Peter Gyrich and Cameron Hodge to create the Sentinels. Master Mold endangers Robert Kelly's life in the first-season finale to which Trask intends to sacrifice himself to destroy his creation but survives.
  - Trask appears in the first season of X-Men '97, voiced by Gavin Hammon.
- Bolivar Trask appears in X-Men: Evolution, voiced by John Novak. This version is a colonel, former member of S.H.I.E.L.D., and a noted anthropologist and cyberneticist who studies genetic mutation. Concluding that mutants will replace humans as the dominant species on Earth if left unchecked and seeking to avert this, he designed the Sentinels to apprehend mutants. In the episode "Day of Reckoning", he kidnaps Wolverine as a test subject for his Sentinel prototype, but Magneto hijacks it to fight the X-Men and publicly reveal mutants' existence before the Sentinel is destroyed by the X-Men. Afterwards, Trask is arrested and incarcerated. In the episode "Uprising", Trask was released from prison and continues the Sentinel project under Nick Fury's supervision to prepare Earth for Apocalypse's threat. Trask creates three upgraded Sentinels, which successfully bring down the force fields protecting Apocalypse's bases before they are destroyed by the Horsemen of Apocalypse.
- Bolivar Trask appears in Wolverine and the X-Men, voiced by Phil LaMarr. This version is a middle-aged African-American scientist working for Senator Robert Kelly alongside Sybil Zane.

=== Film ===
Peter Dinklage as Bolivar Trask in X-Men: Days of Future Past (2014).

Bolivar Trask appears in X-Men: Days of Future Past (2014), portrayed by Peter Dinklage. This version was primarily active in the 1970s, learned of mutants' existence from Charles Xavier's dissertation from Oxford University, and sought to harness mutant powers to create the Sentinel program and bring about world peace by uniting humanity against a common enemy. Due to his inhumane and fatal experiments on mutants, Mystique assassinated him in 1973. However, this made him a martyr for the anti-Mutant movement and led the US government to incorrectly believe that all mutants were a threat to humanity and approve his Sentinel program as a result, eventually leading to the Sentinels driving mutants and humanity to the verge of extinction by 2023. The surviving X-Men send Logan's mind back in time to 1973 in the hopes of convincing Xavier and Erik Lehnsherr's past selves to stop Mystique from assassinating Trask and prevent the Sentinels' further development. Eventually, Xavier convinces Mystique to spare Trask, averting the dystopian future and prompting the government to shut down the Sentinel program while Trask is arrested for selling military secrets to foreign nations.

=== Video games ===
- The Ultimate Marvel incarnation of Bolivar Trask appears in Ultimate Spider-Man, voiced by John Billingsley. In an attempt to recreate the Venom symbiote, Trask hires Silver Sable and the Wild Pack to capture Eddie Brock and Spider-Man. However, the pair break free, Brock merges with Venom, and Sable sells out Trask once the latter's contract with the former expires. Brock and Venom seek revenge on Trask, but Spider-Man defeats the two. Before he is arrested, Trask gives Spider-Man files that reveal the truth about the latter's and Brock's fathers' deaths. While in prison, Trask is confronted by Brock and Venom who kill him off-screen.
- Bolivar Trask appears in X-Men Origins: Wolverine, voiced by Bumper Robinson. This version is an African-American scientist who researches the mutant gene on behalf of Shaw Industries' Systemized Cybernetics Lab. Additionally, work logs reveal that Trask initially took part in creating the Sentinel program for its scientific value until he witnessed a violent incident involving a mutant test subject, came to believe that all mutants are inherently dangerous, and sought to exterminate them to protect humanity. After losing a hand to Wolverine, Trask eventually replaces it with a prosthetic.
- Bolivar Trask appears in Marvel's Wolverine, voiced by Jason Spisak. This version is a scientist and the founder of Trask Industries, dedicated to eradicating mutants due to the perceived threat they pose to humankind. He employs the Reavers and creates the Sentinels to hunt mutants, but after leading an attack on the Essex Institute, he is confronted by Team X at his headquarters in Madripoor and killed by Wolverine.

=== Miscellaneous ===
Bolivar Trask's hatred of mutants is discussed in the non-fiction book From Krakow to Krypton: Jews and Comic Books.
