= Master Mold =

Fictional character in Marvel Comics

- Master Mold in The Incredible Hulk vol. 2 Annual #7 (Oct. 1978). Art by John Byrne.

Publication information
- Publisher: Marvel Comics
- First appearance: The X-Men #15 (Dec. 1965)
- Created by: Stan Lee; Jack Kirby

In-story information
- Species: Robot
- Team affiliations: Sentinels; Project: Armageddon
- Abilities: Superhuman strength, speed, reflexes, and durability; Ability to incorporate metal into itself; Concussive blasts; Plasma discharges; Ability to scan mutants; Flight

Master Mold is a supervillain appearing in American comic books published by Marvel Comics, most commonly depicted as an enemy of the X-Men and the leader of the Sentinel mutant-hunting robots.

== Publication history ==
Master Mold first appeared in The X-Men #15–16 (Dec. 1965 – Jan. 1966), and was created by Stan Lee and Jack Kirby. The character subsequently appeared in The Incredible Hulk Annual #7 (1978); X-Factor #13–14 (Feb.–March 1987); Power Pack #36 (April 1988); Marvel Comics Presents #18–24 (May–July 1989); The Uncanny X-Men #246–247 (July–Aug. 1989); The Sensational She-Hulk #30 (Aug. 1991); and Cyclops: Retribution #1 (Jan. 1994).

Master Mold received an entry in The Official Handbook of the Marvel Universe Update '89 #5.

== Fictional character biography ==
=== Original version ===
The original version of Master Mold is created by Bolivar Trask. Fearing superhuman mutants such as the X-Men, Trask makes a super-computer in the shape of a giant robot that will control and facilitate the construction of the Sentinels (mechanical warriors programmed to hunt and capture mutants). Master Mold is secretly programmed by the time-traveling Madame Sanctity of the Askani Sisterhood with the mission to find and destroy the Twelve, a group of mutants linked to Apocalypse's rise. Master Mold has Trask captured and decides to take over humanity in a bid to protect them. Trask sacrifices himself to destroy Master Mold and prevent the Sentinels from taking over humanity.

=== Second version ===
Another version of Master Mold possesses Steven Lang's brainwaves. After Project Armageddon, Lang tries to activate Master Mold, which merges the former's mind with it instead. The computer suffers great damage by the Hulk and is seemingly destroyed when the base explodes. However, Master Mold survives and creates the Retribution Virus to wipe out mutant-kind. It blames Cyclops entirely for its "death" as Lang. He hypnotizes and utilizes Moira MacTaggert to unleash the virus, infecting Cyclops, Callisto, and Banshee before MacTaggert breaks free of his grasp. While she attempts to cure the virus, Cyclops and Callisto team with Conscience (another artificial construct developed from Lang's brain engrams) to stop Master Mold and save mutant-kind as well as all humanity, which had become threatened by the virus. Cyclops is weakened from the disease's effects but nearly single-handedly destroys Master Mold before falling unconscious. As Master Mold prepares to kill Cyclops and finish unleashing the virus, he is attacked and destroyed by Banshee. The virus is then cured before it has a chance to spread.

The remains of Master Mold later merge with the advanced Sentinel Nimrod from the future. Both are forced through the Siege Perilous, causing them to be reborn as the cyborg Bastion.

=== Third version ===
A third version of Master Mold is a factory built in secret in the jungles of Ecuador. This particular version manufactures Wild Sentinels which are capable of assimilating non-organic materials to assume different shapes. The Wild Sentinels are taken over by Cassandra Nova to devastate Genosha and attack the X-Men. Following their defeat by Rogue's X-Men team, the Children of the Vault escape and regroup in the factory.

=== Mother Mold ===
A new version, Mother Mold, is seen in "House of X and Powers of X". Orchis creates a variant designed to create other Master Molds. It is later revealed that Mother Mold will be the Sentinel generation that leads to the creation of Nimrod.

== Capabilities ==
Dr. Bolivar Trask's original Master Mold with powerful weaponry and the ability to speak; Master Mold was also mobile so that it could defend itself from mutant attackers or so that it can be relocated easily if Trask had to find a new headquarters. Steven Lang's version of Master Mold are also capable of self-repair.

== Other versions ==
=== Infinity Warps ===
Master Mole, a composite character based on Master Mold and Mole Man, appears in Infinity Wars: Infinity Warps #1.

=== Ultimate Marvel ===
Two characters based on Master Mold appear in the Ultimate Marvel universe (Earth-1610):

- The first equivalent is an alternate timeline version of Wolverine who was used as a template to create Sentinels before being killed by the present-day Wolverine and Rogue.
- The second equivalent is a giant Sentinel which houses the consciousness of William Stryker Jr.

=== Weapon X: Days of Future Now ===
In the alternate reality of Weapon X: Days of Future Now, one of Madison Jeffries's Boxbots, dubbed "Bot", becomes Master Mold and traps Jeffries to harness his powers.

=== What If? ===
In What If? Age of Ultron, Zeke Stane uses Master Mold to mass-produce versions of Iron Man's armor.

=== X-Factor Forever ===
In X-Factor Forever Master Mold, Master Mold is bonded to Cameron Hodge by Apocalypse to form Master Meld.

== In other media ==
=== Television ===
Master Mold as he appears in X-Men: The Animated Series

- Master Mold appears in X-Men: The Animated Series, voiced by David Fox in the first season and Nigel Bennett in the fourth season. This version was created by Bolivar Trask and Henry Gyrich. He eventually usurps his creators and kidnaps world leaders in an attempt to replace their brains with computers and bring them under his control, but he is foiled by Professor X and Magneto and destroyed by Morph. However, a Sentinel-dominated future shows him having taken over the Earth.
  - Master Mold appears in X-Men '97, voiced by Eric Bauza.
- Master Mold appears in Wolverine and the X-Men, voiced by Gwendoline Yeo. This version was created by the Mutant Response Division (M.R.D.).

=== Video games ===
- Master Mold appears as a boss in Spider-Man and the X-Men in Arcade's Revenge.
- Master Mold appears as a background character in X-Men: Children of the Atom.
- Master Mold appears in X-Men 2: Clone Wars.
- Master Mold appears in X-Men Legends. This version is a giant Sentinel piloted by anti-mutant extremist William Kincaid.
- Master Mold appears in X-Men: The Official Game. This version was created by William Stryker and Hydra.
- Master Mold appears as the final boss of The Uncanny X-Men – Days of Future Past.
- Master Mold appears as a boss in Marvel: Future Fight.
- Master Mold appears in Marvel Snap.
- Mother Mold appears as a boss in Marvel Mystic Mayhem.
- Master Mold appears as a boss in Marvel Cosmic Invasion, voiced by James C. Mathis III.
- Master Mold appears as a boss in Marvel's Wolverine.

=== Miscellaneous ===
Master Mold appears in Wolverine: The Lost Trail.
