= Hope Summers (character) =

Fictional character

- Cover art for Cable #21 featuring Hope as a teenager

Publication information
- Publisher: Marvel Comics
- First appearance: X-Men #205 (November 2007)
- Created by: Mike Carey (writer); Chris Bachalo (artist)

In-story information
- Species: Human mutant
- Team affiliations: X-Men; X-Men in training The Five; The Lights; Jean Grey School Students; X-Force; Quiet Council of Krakoa
- Partnerships: Cable
- Notable aliases: Mutant Messiah; White Phoenix; MeMe
- Abilities: Power manipulation granting: Power absorption immunity; Power enhancement; Power bestowment; Power activation; Power tracking; Power synergy; Power mimicry; Control and bonding over the Five Lights; Wields the halberd psimitar which amplifies psionic energy

Hope Summers is a character appearing in American comic books published by Marvel Comics. Created by Mike Carey and Chris Bachalo, the character first appeared in X-Men #205 (Jan 2008, during the "X-Men: Messiah Complex" storyline). She is the first mutant born after the events of the "House of M" and "Decimation" storyline.

== Publication history ==
=== "Messiah Complex" ===
Hope is the first mutant to be born after the Decimation, an event in which the Scarlet Witch uses her reality-altering powers to remove the powers of all but 198 mutants. Cable rescues the child, claiming she will be a Messianic figure destined to save both mutant and humankind. The Purifiers and Bishop, however, recall a timeline in which Hope will become the mutant equivalent of the Antichrist and kill a million humans in an instant. This event, known as the "Six Second War", will turn humanity against mutants once again and lead into a new era of mutant persecution, creating the dark timeline into which Bishop is born.

After a battle between the Marauders, the X-Men, and Predator X, Cyclops decides the baby would be better off with Cable and allows him to take her to the future. However, an adamant Bishop decides to track Cable and the baby through time to kill her.

Cable takes the girl to the secluded safe haven of New Liberty in the future, where he marries a woman named Hope. Finding peace there, he raises her with Hope until she is seven years old. After Hope is killed, Cable names the girl Hope after her.

Panel from X-Force/Cable: Messiah War #1 (March 2009), featuring Hope Summers as a child. Art by Mike Choi.

=== "Messiah War" ===
In the Messiah War storyline, Hope Summers is at the center of a conflict between the forces of Stryfe, Cable, and X-Force. During the Messiah War, Hope is kidnapped by Stryfe and witnesses him torture Warpath until Cable, Wolverine, and Elixir rescue them. In the following fight, Bishop loses an eye to Wolverine and has his time travel device damaged. When Cable and Hope are forced to time travel again, Hope resists, wanting to stay with X-23 and Elixir, with whom she had bonded during the events of Messiah War. Hope kicks Cable mid-jump, stranding herself and Cable two years apart. They eventually reunite, with Hope now eleven years old.

=== "Homecoming" and "X-Men: Second Coming" ===
During the "X-Men: Second Coming" story arc, Hope kills Steven Lang and Graydon Creed. Nightcrawler saves her from Bastion, dying in the process. With the assistance of the X-Men, she eradicates Bastion and shatters the dome surrounding San Francisco. At a celebratory bonfire, Emma Frost notices the flames around Hope taking the shape of the Phoenix Force. Fearful, Frost attempts to warn Cyclops, who tells her that Cerebro has located five newly manifested mutants across Earth.

=== The Five Lights ===
Hope is tasked with tracking down the Lights, the four mutants who manifested powers after the events of "Second Coming". Hope finds the suicidal Laurie Tromette in Canada and jump starts her mutation by touching her; she agrees to follow Hope. Being in Canada, Hope expressed an interest in uncovering her biological family. Once the group arrived in Alaska, they discover the identity of Hope's mother Louise Spalding, and Hope meets her maternal grandmother. Hope goes on to recruit three of the other Lights: Gabriel Cohuelo, Idie Okonkwo, and Teon Macik.

=== Generation Hope ===
Generation Hope

Publication information
- Publisher: Marvel Comics
- Schedule: Monthly
- Format: Standard U.S., 4 color. Ongoing.
- Publication date: 2011-12
- No. of issues: 17
- Main character: The Lights

Creative team
- Written by: Kieron Gillen; James Asmus
- Artist: Salvador Espin

At the beginning of the series Generation Hope, Hope and the Lights, along with Rogue, Cyclops and Wolverine, travel to Tokyo to find and help the fifth Light, Kenji Uedo, whose powers are causing destruction. Hope attempts to make contact with Kenji, but he seemingly avoids her touch. She presses on after him, being attacked by him, but eventually does make contact.

A Sixth Light is located in Germany. Hope, the Lights and Shadowcat, arrive to a cordoned off hospital and find the Sixth Light, a baby with telepathic powers, still in the womb of its mother. The baby is terrified to leave the womb and controls people into a zombie-like state to protect it, even expanding its range to those outside. Hope and each of the Lights try to talk to the child telepathically, but are all rejected. Teon is able to talk to the child, using simplistic language to convince it to embrace life. The child is then born, and Hope's touch suppresses the child's X-Gene until it is older.

=== Avengers vs. X-Men ===
In Avengers vs. X-Men, Hope is targeted by the Phoenix Force. The Avengers want to take her into custody to protect her from the Phoenix Force, but the X-Men want her to be able to accept the Phoenix Force as it could help revive the dwindling mutant race. As the two teams start fighting over this, Cyclops orders Emma Frost to take Hope away so she could be safe. As Wolverine moves to apparently kill Hope, he is overwhelmed by Hope, who escapes the compound. While on the run, Hope creates a device that camouflages her power signature and makes her untraceable. When Hope next meets the X-Men, the Phoenix Force arrives and, instead of possessing Hope, possesses each of the five X-Men present. Hope temporarily takes the Phoenix Force for herself, allowing her to partially undo the effects of the Decimation and allow new mutants to be born.

=== Avengers vs. X-Men: Consequences ===
Hope decides to attempt to live a normal life and enrolls in a regular public school while searching for Cable. Around this time, Cable disappears off-the-grid, but he secretly watches Hope and lets her know personally that it's not her job to watch him, but for him to watch over her.

=== X-Force ===
Hope is rendered comatose after being affected by a virus that infected both her and Cable. However, she manifests as a digital avatar by copying the powers of a brain-dead mutant, MeMe. She uses this identity to remain in Cable's team, but is discovered by Psylocke, who chose to keep Hope's identity secret. After her actions are exposed, Hope agrees to have MeMe's life support turned off, thus letting MeMe die and putting Hope back to being in a coma. Hope convinces Fantomex to attack the X-Force, then copies his powers and removes the virus from herself.

=== Krakoan Era ===
When Krakoa is established as a mutant nation, Hope works in tandem with a group of mutants known as The Five in order to revive dead mutants as part of a mutant "circuit" of combined powers, by recreating their bodies and replanting their saved psychic consciousness within. Hope's powers in particular are needed to synergize and enhance the other four mutants, with her later taking over restoring the psychic essences in Xavier's stead. She later joins the Quiet Council of Krakoa, the governing body of Krakoa. When Krakoa is attacked by Orchis, Xavier forces the majority of mutants off Earth through portals after conceding to Orchis's threats to destroy Earth. Xavier believes he has sent the mutants to their deaths, but they have actually been transported to the White Hot Room, a higher plane of existence. Journeying through the White Hot Room, the group determines that the only way to return and save Earth is by reviving the Phoenix Force and locating the recently killed Jean Grey.

Enigma, an omnipresent god-like ascended intelligence derived from Nathaniel Essex, tries to prevent the resurrection of the Phoenix Force. To achieve this, he reaches back in time and tries to coerce Hope's mother into letting him father Hope. Jean, detecting Enigma's attempt to alter history, utilizes the power of the Phoenix Force to stop him. Hope's mother rejects Enigma and Jean describes what Hope will one day be like to her. Jean places a portion of the Phoenix Force within Hope's mother, thereby conceiving Hope. In the White Hot Room, Hope sacrifices herself and is assimilated into the Phoenix Force, allowing it to be reborn. Hope's spirit survives in the White Hot Room, allowing the remaining members of the Five to continue resurrecting mutants there.

== Powers and abilities ==
Hope Summers is an Omega level mutant with an ability of unspecified limits to psychically manipulate and mimic the powers of other mutants.

This ability is primarily manifested as mimicry of the superhuman mutant abilities of those near her, however, she has demonstrated additional powers. When she was born, she unleashed a massive psionic pulse that destroyed Cerebro. She also proved to be immune to Rogue's newly lethal absorption power and her touch erased all of the previous memories and abilities Rogue had absorbed, including those of the Hecatomb. She also cured Rogue of the Strain 88 virus. When the Three-in-One tried to search for her when she was kidnapped by the Marauders, Hope blocked Cerebro from finding her.

Hope Summers can also mimic mutant powers at their utmost capacity. However, she generates power levels that are potentially dangerous to people and the environment around her. Prodigy describes her as a metaphorical "voodoo doll" of the mutant race. In the "Messiah War" storyline, after mentally scanning her, Stryfe hints that she has the same powers he does (telekinesis and telepathy), and is potentially far more powerful than he is. Her ability to mimic the powers of other mutants is restricted by the fact that they have to be "near enough" to her to mimic. When near Cable, Hope showed some telepathic and telekinetic powers at her command by stopping a bullet fired at her by Bishop. She then generated extremely powerful energy blasts that overloaded Bishop's own ability to absorb projected energy.

She can also jump-start a newly emerging mutant power though to an undefined extent, and can redirect the force of magnetic fields into negative matter. Hellion also theorizes that she is able to unconsciously enhance mutant abilities such as his own telekinetic powers to a level he could not reach before she was around him. She also has a connection to the Phoenix Force. Later it was revealed that she is an aspect of the Phoenix Force itself which enabled her to operate independently from the Force itself and become the "White Phoenix of the Crown," albeit temporarily.

In House of X Hope's true abilities come to light, wherein she can modulate as well as control the abilities of other mutants, and primarily uses her powers in conjunction with others in order to resurrect fallen mutants. She synchronizes a mutant circuit called The Five who are able to perform a resurrection alongside Egg (provides biomass for the cloned body), Elixir (biokinesis to foster DNA of the individual to be cloned), Proteus (reality manipulation) & Tempo (chronokinesis to set the body at the correct age of death).

Thanks to Cable's training, Hope has some knowledge of advanced technology. She was able to construct a portable device capable of masking her presence from Cerebra using components found at a common hardware store.

== Reception ==
In 2014, Entertainment Weekly ranked Hope Summers 73rd in their "Let's rank every X-Man ever" list. Various online lists have assessed Hope Summers as among the most powerful X-Men characters.

== In other media ==
=== Film ===
Hope Summers makes a cameo appearance in Deadpool 2, portrayed by Islie Hirvonen. This version is Cable's biological daughter. After she and her mother were killed by Russell Collins, Cable travels back in time to avert the event by killing Russell. However, Deadpool sacrifices himself to save Russell, leading to Cable sacrificing the ability to return to the future to save Deadpool before staying in the present to ensure his family have a brighter future.

=== Video games ===
- Hope Summers appears as a playable character in Marvel Super Hero Squad Online.
- Hope Summers appears in Marvel: War of Heroes.
- Hope Summers appears in X-Men: Battle of the Atom.
- Hope Summers appears in Marvel Snap.
- Hope Summers appears as a playable character in Marvel: Future Fight.

=== Merchandise ===
- Hope Summers received an action figure in Hasbro's Marvel Legends line.
- Hope Summers received a figure in the Minimates line via the "Avengers vs. X-Men" boxset.
- Hope Summers appears in CMON Limited's "Marvel United: X-Men" board game via the "Phoenix Five" expansion.

== Collected editions ==
Title	Material collected	Publication date	ISBN
Generation Hope: The Future's a Four-Lettered Word	Generation Hope #1–5	June 2011	0-7851-4719-5
Generation Hope: Schism	Generation Hope #6–12	January 2012	0-7851-5242-3
Generation Hope: The End of a Generation	Generation Hope #13–17	May 2012	0-7851-5244-X
