= William Stryker =

Fictional character in Marvel Comics

- William Stryker as he first appeared in X-Men: God Loves, Man Kills. Art by Brent Anderson.

Publication information
- Publisher: Marvel Comics
- First appearance: X-Men: God Loves, Man Kills (November 1982)
- Created by: Chris Claremont (writer); Brent Anderson (artist)

In-story information
- Species: Human
- Team affiliations: Weapon X, formerly Stryker's Crusade and the Purifiers
- Abilities: Genius-level intellect; Sophistication and wisdom; Military training; Possession of the forearm (hand to elbow) of the Sentinel Nimrod; Psychological warfare and manipulation

Reverend William Stryker is a fictional character in Marvel Comics, known for his recurring role as an adversary of the X-Men. A former sergeant and a devout Christian minister, Stryker harbors an intense hatred for mutants, often leading campaigns against them. He is also the father of Jason Stryker, a mutant who plays a significant role in his motivations.

The character made his debut in the graphic novel X-Men: God Loves, Man Kills (1982), created by writer Chris Claremont and artist Brent Anderson. Stryker is characterized by his high intelligence, military training, and expertise in psychological manipulation. He has been affiliated with several organizations, including Weapon X and, previously, Stryker's Crusade and the Purifiers.

Stryker has been featured in the X-Men film series, where he is portrayed as Colonel William Stryker, the leader of Weapon X and a primary antagonist of Wolverine. He is portrayed by Brian Cox in X2 (2003), Danny Huston in X-Men Origins: Wolverine (2009), and Josh Helman in X-Men: Days of Future Past (2014) and X-Men: Apocalypse (2016).

In 2009, IGN ranked William Stryker as the 70th Greatest Comic Book Villain of All Time.

== Publication history ==
William Stryker was created by writer Chris Claremont and artist Brent Anderson, making his first appearance in the 1982 graphic novel X-Men: God Loves, Man Kills. The character was reportedly modeled after American televangelist Jerry Falwell.

== Fictional character biography ==
=== God Loves, Man Kills ===
Reverend William Stryker is a religious fanatic with a military background, characterized by his intense hatred of mutants. This animosity drives him to commit horrific acts, including the murder of his own wife, Marcy Stryker, and their mutant son shortly after the child's birth in Nevada. Following these events, Stryker experiences a suicide attempt. Over time, he becomes convinced that Satan is responsible for the emergence of mutants, as part of a plot to destroy humanity by corrupting prenatal souls. Stryker ultimately interprets the birth of his mutant son as a sign from God, compelling him to fulfill his perceived calling: the eradication of all mutants.

Fueled by this conviction, Stryker rises to prominence as a controversial preacher and televangelist. His followers, which include a secret paramilitary group known as the Purifiers, engage in hate crimes against mutants. In a calculated move, Stryker orchestrates the kidnapping and brainwashing of Professor Xavier, connecting him to a device designed to eliminate all living mutants. To thwart this plan, the X-Men are compelled to ally with Magneto. The extent of Stryker's bigotry is further revealed when he attempts to murder Kitty Pryde during a live television broadcast, resulting in an NYPD officer shooting him.

=== God Loves, Man Kills II ===
Stryker reappears in the X-Treme X-Men storyline, having been presumed forgotten within the narrative. It is revealed that he had been serving a prison sentence due to the consequences of his previous actions. During his transfer on an airplane, Lady Deathstrike infiltrates the aircraft, where she kills Stryker's guards and rescues him. It is then disclosed that the two are lovers, and Stryker promptly initiates a new crusade against the X-Men, targeting Wolverine, Cannonball, the X-Treme X-Men team, and Shadowcat, with whom he holds a longstanding grudge.

Stryker dispatches a group of his followers to confront several X-Men members and kidnaps Kitty Pryde. During this encounter, Pryde manages to persuade Stryker that mutants are not an abomination. This revelation leads him to seemingly turn over a new leaf as he merges with the sentient artificial intelligence Reverend Paul, ultimately being placed in a containment tube.

=== "Decimation" ===
Following the events of the "House of M" storyline, Stryker targets the remaining mutants after most of the mutants on Earth lost their powers. Stryker orchestrates an attack on the Xavier Institute, resulting in the deaths of approximately one-quarter of the academy's students. Following the defeat of the Purifiers, Stryker is killed by Elixir.

Stryker is later resurrected by Bastion with a Technarch to join his new Purifiers. Bastion assigns Stryker the task of locating Hope Summers and Cable following their return from the future. His Purifiers, in conjunction with Cameron Hodge's soldiers, engage the X-Men and New Mutants before Archangel kills Stryker by slicing him in half.

=== Behind the Weapon X Project ===
During the "Weapons of Mutant Destruction" storyline, Stryker is resurrected as a cyborg and forms a new incarnation of Weapon X. He focuses on having his scientists develop Adamantium cyborgs with the goal of eradicating humanity. To refine the cyborgs, Stryker instructs Weapon X to target Old Man Logan, Sabretooth, Warpath, Domino, and Lady Deathstrike, selecting these mutants for their unique abilities.

Stryker and several of his Adamantium cyborgs attempt to recapture Weapon X's rogue experiment, H-Alpha. However, H-Alpha kills all the cyborgs and severely injures Stryker. Stryker is subsequently found by Logan's group and the new Wolverine, and he agrees to disclose how to defeat H-Alpha.

=== Weapon X-Force ===
Believing that God no longer supports his crusade against mutants, Stryker and the Church of Human Potential turn to Satanism and dark magic rituals to destroy mutantkind. Stryker recruits Mentallo as a follower and has him use his powers to force mutants to join Stryker's cult, whom he intends to sacrifice.

Mentallo captures M and uses her as bait to lure Weapon X-Force. In the ensuing confrontation, Weapon X-Force rescues M, destroys the Church, and kills Stryker. However, with his dying breath, Stryker reveals that he orchestrated these events so Mentallo could summon him from Hell.

X-Force splits its efforts between battling Stryker in Hell and confronting Mentallo on Earth. During the conflict, Sabretooth falls into Mentallo's sacrifice pit, which is essential for completing Stryker's ritual. As Stryker ascends from Hell, Sabretooth decapitates him and destroys his soul.

== Other versions ==
=== Age of Apocalypse ===
In the alternate timeline depicted in the 1995 Age of Apocalypse storyline, William Stryker is raised by a preacher father who cares for him and other children in their town after most of the townspeople are slaughtered by mutants. However, his father is later killed by other surviving humans. Consequently, Stryker lives in hiding, learning to depend on both humans and mutants, which makes this version far more tolerant than his counterpart in Earth-616.

=== Ultimate Marvel ===
The Ultimate Marvel universe features two distinct versions of William Stryker.

==== William Stryker Sr. ====
An admiral named William Stryker Sr. serves as the leader of the anti-mutant conspiracy within the U.S. Government.

==== William Stryker Jr. ====
William Stryker Jr. is a reverend who resides in Manhattan with his wife, Kate Stryker, and their son, John Stryker. He experiences a profound tragedy when his family is killed during the "Ultimatum Wave" that strikes New York. Although Stryker survives, he struggles to cope with his grief. He attempts to lead a spiritual congregation of survivors in a tent set up in Central Park but fails to conduct his service successfully.

Stryker encounters a group of men who inform him that the mutant Magneto is responsible for the Ultimatum Wave and encourages his growing hatred of all mutants. Stryker leads the Purifier forces in an attack on the Xavier Mansion, emerging as the sole survivor after the reformed Weapon X team kills all the Purifiers present except for him.

Kitty Pryde kills Stryker by phasing an arm through his abdomen. In his dying moments, he manipulates a wave of Nimrod Sentinels to eliminate every mutant in the country. As the Nimrods begin hunting mutants nationwide, some are commanded by Master Mold, which contains Stryker's consciousness. Stryker leads an assault against Pryde's team of mutants until Pryde destroys him.

== In other media ==
=== Television ===
William Stryker appears in X-Men '97, voiced by J. P. Karliak. This version is an anti-mutant Christian minister and leader of the Purifiers.

=== Film ===
Brian Cox as Colonel William Stryker in X2

Danny Huston as Major William Stryker in X-Men Origins: Wolverine

Josh Helman as Major Bill Stryker in X-Men: Days of Future Past and X-Men: Apocalypse

- William Stryker appears in X2, primarily portrayed by Brian Cox and by Brad Loree in flashbacks. This version is a U.S. Army Colonel and scientist who previously lobotomized his son, Jason, to make him more docile and to extract a mind-controlling substance from his body. After kidnapping and brainwashing several mutants, Stryker battles the X-Men with the intent of using his son in a plot to kill all mutants. The confrontation results in the breaking of a dam full of water, where Wolverine elects to leave Stryker to die chained to a rock.
- William Stryker appears in X-Men Origins: Wolverine, portrayed by Danny Huston. He appears as an army major and the leader of Weapon X, who manipulates Wolverine into receiving adamantium implants and later shoots him in the head, resulting in long-term amnesia.
- William Stryker's father William Sr., credited as Agent Stryker, appears in X-Men: First Class, portrayed by Don Creech. He is a CIA agent who attacks the X-Men, contributing to Magneto's animosity towards humans and the foundation of both the X-Men and the Brotherhood of Mutants.
- A younger version of William Stryker appears in X-Men: Days of Future Past, portrayed by Josh Helman. In 1973, he serves Bolivar Trask and battles the time-traveling X-Men. By the end of the movie, his likeness is impersonated by Mystique.
- William Stryker also appears in X-Men: Apocalypse, once again portrayed by Josh Helman. In 1983, he ends up capturing multiple X-Men members until they are broken out and rescued by the rest of their team.

=== Video games ===
- William Stryker appears in X-Men Origins: Wolverine, voiced by David Florek.
- William Stryker appears in Marvel Heroes, voiced by James M. Connor.
