= List of X-Men: The Animated Series and X-Men '97 characters =

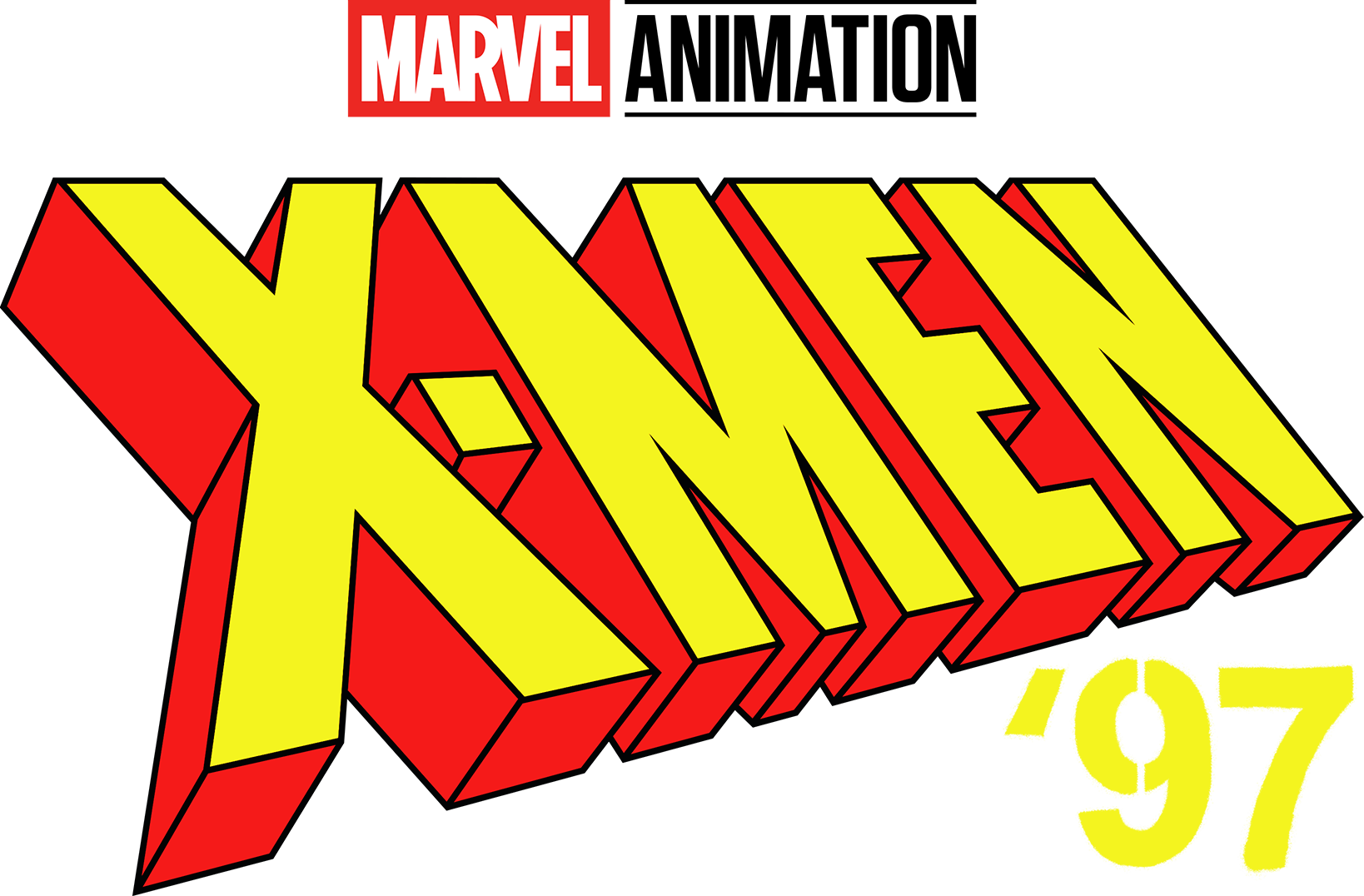
The logos of X-Men: The Animated Series and X-Men '97

This is a list of characters from the animated series X-Men: The Animated Series (1992–1997), its manga adaptation X-Men: The Manga (1994–1999) and its animated revival X-Men '97 (2024–present).

== Cast and characters ==
List indicators

This section includes main cast members, recurring characters, and notable guest stars.

- An empty grey cell indicates the character was not in the television series.
- ^{Y} indicates a younger version of the character.

Main cast and characters of X-Men: The Animated Series and X-Men '97
Character	X-Men: The Animated Series					X-Men '97	
Character	Season 1 (1992–1993)	Season 2 (1993–1994)	Season 3 (1994–1995)	Season 4 (1995–1996)	Season 5 (1996–1997)	Season 1 (2024)	Season 2 (2026)
Cyclops Scott Summers	Norm Spencer	Norm Spencer	Norm Spencer	Norm Spencer	Norm Spencer	Ray Chase	Ray Chase
Wolverine Logan	Cal Dodd	Cal Dodd	Cal Dodd	Cal Dodd	Cal Dodd	Cal Dodd	Cal Dodd
Rogue Anna-Marie Darkholme	Lenore Zann	Lenore Zann	Lenore Zann	Lenore Zann	Lenore Zann	Lenore Zann	Lenore Zann
Storm Ororo Munroe	Iona Morris	Alison Sealy-Smith	Alison Sealy-Smith	Alison Sealy-Smith	Alison Sealy-Smith	Alison Sealy-Smith	Alison Sealy-Smith
Beast Dr. Henry "Hank" McCoy	George Buza	George Buza	George Buza	George Buza	George Buza	George Buza	George Buza
Gambit Remy LeBeau	Chris Potter	Chris Potter	Chris Potter	Chris Potter	Chris Potter Tony Daniels	A.J. LoCascio	A.J. LoCascio
Jubilee Jubilation Lee	Alyson Court	Alyson Court	Alyson Court	Alyson Court	Alyson Court	Holly Chou	Holly Chou
Jean Grey	Catherine Disher	Catherine Disher	Catherine Disher	Catherine Disher	—N/a	Jennifer Hale	Jennifer Hale
Madelyne Pryor	—N/a	—N/a	—N/a	Catherine Disher	Catherine Disher	Jennifer Hale	—N/a
Professor X Charles Xavier	Cedric Smith	Cedric Smith	Cedric Smith	Cedric Smith	Cedric Smith	Ross Marquand	Ross Marquand
Magneto Erik "Magnus" Lehnsherr	David Hemblen	David Hemblen	—N/a	David Hemblen	David Hemblen	Matthew Waterson	Matthew Waterson
Forge Daniel Lone Eagle	Marc Strange	Marc Strange	Marc Strange	Marc Strange	Marc Strange	Gil Birmingham	Gil Birmingham
Henry Peter Gyrich	Barry Flatman	—N/a	—N/a	Barry Flatman	Barry Flatman	Todd Haberkorn	—N/a
Lucas Bishop	Philip Akin	Philip Akin	—N/a	Philip Akin	—N/a	Isaac Robinson-Smith	Isaac Robinson-Smith
Apocalypse En Sabah Nur	John Colicos	John Colicos	James Blendick	James Blendick	James Blendick	Ross Marquand Adetokumboh M'Cormack^{Y}	Ross Marquand Adetokumboh M'Cormack^{Y}
Mister Sinister Dr. Nathaniel Essex	Christopher Britton	Christopher Britton	—N/a	Christopher Britton	Christopher Britton	Christopher Britton	—N/a
Morph	Ron Rubin	Ron Rubin	—N/a	Ron Rubin	Ron Rubin	J. P. Karliak	J. P. Karliak
Robert Kelly	Len Carlson	Len Carlson	—N/a	Len Carlson	Len Carlson	Ron Rubin	—N/a
Cable Nathan Summers	Lawrence Bayne	Lawrence Bayne	—N/a	Lawrence Bayne	—N/a	Chris Potter Michael Johnston^{Y}	Chris Potter Michael Johnston^{Y}
Moira MacTaggert	Lally Cadeau	—N/a	Fiona Reid	Eve Crawford	Fiona Reid	Martha Marion	—N/a
Banshee Sean Cassidy	—N/a	—N/a	Philip Williams	Philip Williams	Philip Williams	David Errigo Jr.	—N/a
Callisto	Jennifer Dale	—N/a	Jennifer Dale	Jennifer Dale	—N/a	Courtenay Taylor	—N/a
Leech	Ron Rubin	—N/a	Ron Rubin	Ron Rubin	—N/a	David Errigo Jr.	—N/a
Bolivar Trask	Dan Hennessey	—N/a	—N/a	Dan Hennessey	—N/a	Gavin Hammon	—N/a
Sentinels	David Fox	—N/a	—N/a	Barry Flatman	—N/a	Eric Bauza	—N/a
Master Mold	David Fox	—N/a	—N/a	Nigel Bennett	—N/a	Eric Bauza	—N/a
Mojo	—N/a	Peter Wildman	—N/a	—N/a	Peter Wildman	David Errigo Jr.	—N/a
Spiral	—N/a	Cynthia Belliveau	—N/a	—N/a	Cynthia Belliveau	Abby Trott	—N/a
Nightcrawler Kurt Wagner	—N/a	—N/a	Adrian Hough	—N/a	Adrian Hough	Adrian Hough	Adrian Hough
Lilandra Neramani	—N/a	—N/a	Kristina Nicoll	Kristina Nicoll	Kristina Nicoll	Morla Gorrondonna	—N/a
Gladiator Kallark	—N/a	—N/a	Richard Epcar	Raymond O'Neil	—N/a	David Errigo Jr.	—N/a
Sebastian Shaw	—N/a	—N/a	David Bryant	—N/a	—N/a	Travis Willingham	—N/a
Emma Frost	—N/a	—N/a	Cynthia Dale	—N/a	—N/a	Martha Marion	Zehra Fazal
Strong Guy Guido Carosella	—N/a	—N/a	Uncredited	—N/a	—N/a	Adrian Hough	Adrian Hough
Valerie Cooper	—N/a	—N/a	—N/a	—N/a	—N/a	Catherine Disher	Catherine Disher
Sunspot Roberto da Costa	—N/a	—N/a	—N/a	—N/a	—N/a	Gui Agustini	Gui Agustini
Psylocke Betsy Braddock	—N/a	—N/a	—N/a	Tasha Simms	—N/a	—N/a	Naoko Mori
Archangel Warren Worthington III	Stephen Ouimette	—N/a	Stephen Ouimette	Stephen Ouimette	—N/a	—N/a	Christopher Barger
Polaris Lorna Dane	—N/a	—N/a	Mary Long	—N/a	Mary Long	—N/a	Carolina Ravassa
Colossus Piotr Rasputin	Robert Cait	Robert Cait	—N/a	—N/a	—N/a	—N/a	Robert Cait

== Hero teams ==
=== X-Men ===
- Cyclops / Scott Summers (voiced by Norm Spencer in the original series, Ray Chase in X-Men '97) – The field commander of the X-Men, who is shown to be in his late twenties. He is generally aloof and has occasionally expressed doubts about his leadership. He is in a relationship with Jean Grey throughout the series before eventually marrying her. His eyes can emit powerful beams of light energy, which he controls by either closing his eyes or hiding them behind ruby-quartz crystals, usually in the form of sunglasses. In X-Men '97, Cyclops is still in a relationship with Jean and starts to be friendly towards Madelyne Pryor due to Mister Sinister switching the two.
- Wolverine / Logan (voiced by Cal Dodd) – He remembers little of his past, and while he never kills opponents, it is implied that he would if the other X-Men did not hold him back. He is also in love with Jean, which, along with Cyclops's decision to leave Morph and Beast behind following a Sentinel attack, causes him to resent Cyclops. He possesses a regenerative healing power and heightened senses, along with claws and an adamantium endoskeleton, which are not part of his mutant abilities.
- Rogue / Anna-Marie Darkholme (voiced by Lenore Zann) – She is shown to be in her mid-twenties and speaks with a Southern accent. She has the power to draw out a human's energy from a touch, allowing her to absorb their psyche, skills, and powers for a duration. This can cause unconsciousness and, in some cases, comas. She also has the powers of super strength, invulnerability, and flight, which she gained from Ms. Marvel after draining most of her energy, causing her to fall into a coma and gain her powers permanently. Rogue inadvertently put her boyfriend Cody Robbins in a coma when her powers manifested during their first kiss. Despite reciprocating Gambit's feelings for her, she pushes him away out of fear of harming him. Rogue is the adoptive daughter of Mystique, having been taken in when she ran away from home after her father rejected her for being a mutant.
- Storm / Ororo Munroe (voiced by Iona Morris in 1992–1993 of the original series, Alison Sealy-Smith in 1993–1997 of the original series, X-Men '97, and What If…?) – A member of the X-Men who was orphaned at an early age and spent her childhood living on the streets, often stealing to survive. Early on in the series, she defeats Callisto to become the leader of the Morlocks, but later gives the position back to her. She is capable of controlling weather and can fly through bursts of wind. Like her comic counterpart, Storm is claustrophobic. In X-Men '97, Storm loses her powers after X-Cutioner attacks her with a special weapon. Storm regains her abilities when fighting Adversary.
- Beast / Henry "Hank" McCoy (voiced by George Buza) – A member of the X-Men who is kindhearted and highly intelligent; however, as shown in "Beauty and the Beast", he can be aggressive to protect those he loves, as he falls in love with a blind patient he is treating and goes to rescue her after the Friends of Humanity kidnap her. He has the powers of agility and super strength; following an experiment to remove his powers, McCoy mutated further into a blue ape-like form.
- Gambit / Remy LeBeau (voiced by Chris Potter in 1992–1996 of the original series, Tony Daniels in 1997 of the original series, A.J. LoCascio in X-Men '97) – He is originally from New Orleans and speaks with a thick Cajun accent and is shown to be in his late twenties. In the past, he was affiliated with the civil war between thieves and assassins. Over time, he and Rogue's relationship develops into a more mature, loving one. While he is shown to have a cocky personality, he is also shown to have a strong sense of honor and loyalty to those he considers family, especially the X-Men. He has the power to charge objects with kinetic energy which become explosive when thrown. His strength and agility possibly come from this, as he can charge himself with energy. In X-Men '97, Gambit is still in a relationship with Rogue. He is killed in the episode "Remember It" when he sacrifices himself to save Genosha from Master Mold's attack.
- Jubilee / Jubilation Lee (voiced by Alyson Court in the original series, Holly Chou in X-Men '97) – The youngest of the X-Men, who was previously an orphan sent to many foster homes. In the first episode, she is captured by the Mutant Control Agency as bait to draw out the X-Men but is rescued. She is carefree and wants to be seen as an adult by others, but the team appreciates her involvement. She has the power to create pyrokinetic sparks from her hands, which she can use to attack from a distance or disable machinery. In X-Men '97, Jubilee is briefly trapped in Mojo's Motendo and encounters Abscissa, a construct based on her. In the second season, she joins X-Force, but later rejoins X-Men.
- Jean Grey (voiced by Catherine Disher in the original series, Jennifer Hale in X-Men '97) – The heart and soul of the X-Men, who usually is at Professor X's side to aid him. Unlike most adaptations, she is depicted as being his first student. Her costume is largely the same as the one she wore in Uncanny X-Men #281 when she joined Storm's Gold Team, although her hair is tied back rather than worn loose. Throughout the series, she and Scott's relationship is explored in more depth and she takes on a central role in the "Phoenix Saga", where she is possessed by the Phoenix Force. She has the power of telekinesis and minor telepathic skills similar to Professor X. In X-Men '97, Jean is briefly swapped with Madelyne Pryor by Mister Sinister.
- Professor X / Charles Xavier (voiced by Cedric Smith in the original series, Ross Marquand in X-Men '97) – The founder of the X-Men. Unlike in the comics, Xavier lost the use of his legs battling Magneto and uses a hovering chair instead of a wheelchair. His dark side briefly manifests during the "Phoenix Saga". He possesses powerful telepathic abilities, allowing him to see people's minds or control their thoughts or actions. In the series finale "Graduation Day", Xavier is mortally wounded by Henry Peter Gyrich and taken away by the Shi'ar to recover. In X-Men '97, Professor X has recovered and is set to marry Lilandra. After experiencing a vision about the Wild Sentinel attacking Genosha, Professor X declines the wedding plans and asks to be taken back to Earth immediately.
- Morph (voiced by Ron Rubin in the original series, J.P. Karliak in X-Men '97) – A member of the X-Men with shapeshifting abilities and a close friend of Wolverine who was seemingly killed by the Sentinels. Morph reappears as a recurring villain in the second season, which reveals that they were rescued and brainwashed by Mister Sinister until Professor X frees them from the brainwashing's effects. In X-Men '97, Morph returns to the X-Men and is referred to as non-binary.
- Bishop / Lucas Bishop (voiced by Philip Akin in the original series, Isaac Robinson-Smith in X-Men '97) – Bishop originates from a possible future and was originally a "tracker", a mutant collaborating with the Sentinels hunting down members of the Resistance until he was deemed unnecessary and marked for extermination, which prompted him to join the Resistance. He travels back in time to stop the assassination of Senator Kelly and prevent the "Days of Future Past" timeline from occurring. While he succeeds in saving Kelly, in his timeline there is no recollection of the X-Men as they have all died. Later, he returns to stop the spread of Apocalypse's techno-organic virus; however, he also faces resistance from Cable, who knows the virus is necessary as it will also lead to the salvation of mutant-kind. In X-Men '97, Bishop joins the X-Men.
- Magneto / Erik Lehnsherr (voiced by David Hemblen in the original series, Matthew Waterson in X-Men '97, Victor Young in "Family Ties" and "Beyond Good and Evil") – Magneto is introduced as an antagonist to the X-Men. In the first season's finale, he helps the X-Men defeat the Master Mold and the Sentinels. He appears in nearly every episode in the second season, in which he and Professor Xavier are powerless and travel throughout the Savage Land. At the end of that season, the X-Men save them from Mr. Sinister, and they regain their powers. In the fourth season, he allies with Apocalypse but turns on him after discovering his true agenda and aids the X-Men in defeating him. Later, he constructs Asteroid M as a haven for mutants, but his dream is ruined by Fabian Cortez. Broken, Magneto secludes himself in the Arctic and does not care about the possible destruction of life on Earth until he learns that the Phalanx has kidnapped his son, Quicksilver. He teams up with them to defeat the Phalanx and saves everyone he has captured. By the end of the series, Magneto has gathered up an entire army of rebellious mutants only to receive news from Wolverine, Cyclops, and Jean Grey that Professor X is dying. In X-Men '97, Magneto becomes the leader of the X-Men in Professor X's absence and is pardoned for his crimes at the United Nations.
- Nightcrawler / Kurt Wagner (voiced by Adrian Hough) – Nightcrawler makes guest appearances in the episodes "Nightcrawler" and "Bloodlines" and never joined the X-Men. He was shown first in an episode that featured him as a monk in a Swiss abbey, persecuted by one of his superiors and the townspeople who believed him to be a demon. Gambit, Rogue, and Wolverine helped him through his trials. The second episode reveals his origins as the birth son of Mystique, discovered by his foster-sister Rogue. In the end, after a discussion with Rogue, Mystique seemingly dies to save both of them from Graydon Creed (though secretly survives). In X-Men '97, he appears in the episode "Remember It", where he travels to Genosha and meets up with Gambit, Magneto, and Rogue. After the Wild Sentinel attack caused by Mister Sinister, Nightcrawler joins the X-Men.
- Sunspot / Roberto da Costa (voiced by Gui Agustini) – Roberto da Costa first appears in "To Me, My X-Men", the pilot episode of X-Men '97. He is the second newest recruit of the X-Men with the mutant ability to channel large concentrations of solar energy. His character arc is similar to that of Jubilee when she first joined the team, and they develop a close relationship. In the second season, he joins X-Force, but later rejoins X-Men.
- Forge (voiced by Marc Strange in the original series, Gil Birmingham in X-Men '97) – Forge guest-starred in a few episodes. In the present, he is the leader of the government-run X-Factor team; and in the future, he leads the mutant team called Xavier's Security Enforcers, who battle the Sentinels. In X-Men '97, Forge creates power-negating weapons, but works with Storm to help her regain her powers when she is affected by the weapon. In the second season, he joins the X-Men to bring them back to the 90's.
- Polaris / Lorna Dane (voiced by Mary Long in the original series, Carolina Ravassa in X-Men '97) – Polaris appears in the episode "Cold Comfort" as a member of X-Factor. Polaris had been a member of the X-Men alongside her boyfriend, Iceman, though they eventually left to pursue a normal life. However, Polaris left Iceman and became a member of X-Factor and fell in love with Havok which she later admitted to Iceman following the X-Men's fight with X-Factor. Polaris can manipulate electromagnetism allowing her to fly, create force fields, project concussive blasts, and manipulate metal. In X-Men '97, after aggressively taking down anti-mutant terrorists, Valerie Cooper to dismiss her from the team due to bad publicity and she returns to the X-Men.

=== X-Force ===
X-Force is a team of mutants founded by Cable to continue the fight of the X-Men, and stop Apocalypse. They first appeared in the X-Men '97 episode "A Force to be Reckoned With".

- Cable / Nathan Summers (voiced by Lawrence Bayne in the original series, Chris Potter in X-Men '97, Michael Johnston as a younger Nathan Summers in X-Men '97) – Cable is introduced in the episode "Slave Island", where he attempts to shut down the production of power-inhibiting collars that are used on Genosha. Cable later appears in the two-part episode "Time Fugitives", where he travels back in time to stop Bishop from preventing the outbreak of Apocalypse's techno-organic virus. "Time Fugitives" and "Beyond Good and Evil" established Cable's back story as waging a war along with his comrades, Clan Chosen, against Apocalypse, as well as the New Canaanite government, in a dystopian future. In X-Men '97, he is revealed to be the son of Cyclops and Madelyne Pryor, and is born in the present day. After Mister Sinister infects him with a techno-organic virus, Nathan is transported to the future, where there may be a cure for his condition.
- Angel / Archangel / Warren Worthington III (voiced by Stephen Ouimette in the original series, Christopher Barger in X-Men '97) – Archangel's origin was retold in the series, where Apocalypse creates the Four Horsemen of the Apocalypse. Angel goes to a scientist who claims he can "cure" mutants, but it is Mystique, a servant of Apocalypse, who turns him into Death. Angel also makes a cameo appearance in the "Beyond Good and Evil" four-part episode, and as one of the original X-Men in two flashbacks. In this version, he overcomes the Death persona to become Archangel thanks to Rogue, who drains his evil persona from him. In the second season of X-Men '97 he joins X-Force.
- Psylocke / Elizabeth Braddock (voiced by Tasha Simms in the original series, Naoko Mori in X-Men '97) – Psylocke appears during the fourth season in the episode "The Promise of Apocalypse" (Beyond Good and Evil, part 2), and in the episode "End and Beginning" (Beyond Good and Evil, part 4). In this storyline, Psylocke appears to be a lone warrior who practices theft with a cause (a-la-Robin Hood). In the second season of X-Men '97, Psylocke joins X-Force.

=== X-Factor ===
X-Factor are a group of mutants who serve the U.S. government.

- Havok / Alex Summers (voiced by an uncredited actor in the original series, Teddy Sears in X-Men '97) – Havok guest-starred in the episode "Cold Comfort" as a member of X-Factor and was revealed to be romantically involved with Iceman's ex-girlfriend Lorna Dane. In the episode, X-Factor fights against the X-Men for a "friendly skirmish", as Forge puts it. Havok can metabolize cosmic radiation and discharge it as energy blasts from his arms. Cyclops and Havok are immune to each other's powers.
- Multiple Man / James Madrox (voiced by Tom Harvey) – Multiple Man appeared in the episode "Cold Comfort" as a member of X-Factor. He can perform self-duplication by absorbing kinetic energy. In X-Men '97, he appears in the episode "Remember It" where he travels to Genosha.
- Quicksilver / Pietro Maximoff (voiced by Paul Haddad) – Quicksilver is a mutant with superhuman speed who guest-starred in a couple of episodes. In the episode "Family Ties", Quicksilver and his sister, the Scarlet Witch, look for their long-lost father and discover that he is Magneto.
- Strong Guy / Guido Carosella (voiced by an uncredited actor in the original series, Adrian Hough in X-Men '97) – Strong Guy appears in the episode "Cold Comfort" as a member of X-Factor who can channel kinetic energy into physical strength. In X-Men '97, Strong Guy appears in the episode "Bright Eyes" assisting in the relief of Genosha following the aftermath of the Wild Sentinel attack on Genosha.
- Wolfsbane / Rahne Sinclair (voiced by Jennifer Hale) – Wolfsbane appears in the episode "Cold Comfort" as a member of X-Factor who can transform into a werewolf-like creature.
- Siryn / Theresa Cassidy – Siryn is Banshee's daughtier who appears in the X-Men '97 episode "Survival of the Fittest" as a member of X-Factor who can like her father she possesses a superhuman scream.

=== Alpha Flight ===
Alpha Flight was seen in the episode "Repo Man". Vindicator (who had renamed himself Guardian in the comics) and the Canadian Alpha Flight capture Wolverine. The Canadian government demands their project back. Either he joins their team as originally planned or they repossess his indestructible, adamantium skeleton.

- Vindicator / James Hudson (voiced by Barry Flatman) – Alpha Flight's leader. His powered suit allows him to fly, fire energy blasts, and create a personal force field.
- Shaman / Michael Twoyoungmen (voiced by Don Francks) – A member of Alpha Flight.
- Puck / Eugene Judd (voiced by Don Francks) – A short member of Alpha Flight with super-strength, agility, reflexes, and durability.
- Snowbird / Narya – A member of Alpha Flight with flight and the ability to morph into Arctic creatures.
- Northstar / Jean-Paul Beaubier (voiced by Rene Lemieux) – A member of Alpha Flight who can fly and generate a flash of blinding light in coordination with his sister Aurora. In the episode "Slave Island", Jean-Paul is a prisoner on Genosha before he escapes with the help of the X-Men. In "Repo Man", Northstar is shown as part of the Canadian special forces team Alpha Flight, which tries to convince former member Wolverine to re-join.
- Aurora / Jeanne Marie Beaubier (voiced by Jennifer Dale) – A member of Alpha Flight who shares Northstar's powers when they slap hands. Aurora appeared in the episodes "Slave Island" and "Repo Man".
- Sasquatch / Walter Langowski (voiced by Harvey Atkin) – A scientific genius and member of Alpha Flight. He is a massive Bigfoot-like creature with superhuman strength, healing factor, sharp claws, and teeth.
- Heather Hudson (voiced by Rebecca Jenkins) – A scientist and member of Alpha Flight who is the wife of James Hudson

=== Xavier's Security Enforcers and The Resistance (in Bishop's future) ===
- Forge – This aged version of Forge leads Xavier's Security Enforcers, a team that resists the Sentinels in the "Days of Future Past" timeline, alongside Wolverine, Bishop, and Shard. In the altered timeline, created when Trevor Fitzroy murdered Professor X, Forge is a cyborg and servant of Master Mold.
- Wolverine – This aged version of Wolverine is also a member of the Resistance.
- Shard / Shard Bishop (voiced by Sandi Ross in the original series, Kimberly Woods in X-Men '97) – Shard is seen in the "Beyond Good and Evil" storyline when Bishop is sucked back into the time-portal and trapped in the Axis of Time. Shard comes back to the present to find her brother; however, when she gets to the present, she sees Mr. Sinister trying to kidnap Professor X, so she stops him. Then she asks the X-Men for help in finding her brother.
- Malcolm and Randall are shown as members in Shard's video recordings.

=== Clan Chosen (in Cable's future) ===
- Genesis / Tyler Dayspring (voiced by Stuart Stone) – Genesis is Cable's son. He appears as a child in "Time Fugitives", when Cable's timeline starts restoring itself, so Cable goes back in time to stop Bishop from preventing the plague. Tyler appears as a young adult in "Beyond Good and Evil".
- Hope, Dawnsilk, Boak, and Garrison Kane appear as members of Clan Chosen.

=== X-Terminators (unnamed) ===
- Rusty, Skids, Boom-Boom, and Wiz Kid were featured as orphans in the episode "No Mutant is an Island". In the episode, Cyclops, still in mourning after Jean Grey's apparent death, quits the X-Men and returns to his orphanage home in Nebraska. A man known as Killgrave offers to help and adopted the orphans seemingly out of charity. In reality, Killgrave, a mutant himself with telepathic abilities, intends to use the children to make them his army to destroy all humans in the world so that mutants are accepted. Killgrave brainwashes the four and uses them to storm the governor's mansion so he can make the governor his mind-controlled slave. Scott is able to snap Rusty and the others out of Killgrave's hypnotic brainwashing in the end and save the mutant children. Later, Cyclops returns to the mansion and learns that Jean Grey is alive.

== Guest allies ==
- President Robert Kelly (voiced by Len Carlson in the original series, Ron Rubin in X-Men '97) – Robert Kelly ran for president on an anti-mutant campaign during the beginning of the first season. Shortly after he is elected president, Kelly comes to support the X-Men after they rescued him from both an assassination attempt by Mystique and an attempted brainwashing by Master Mold. In the second season, Kelly takes office as president and pardons Beast, who had been unfairly arrested. These actions led Kelly's former, anti-mutant supporters to feel betrayed by him and spread anti-mutant backlash.
- Iceman / Bobby Drake (voiced by Jesse Collins) – Bobby Drake appeared as a former member of the team, who quit due to disagreements with Xavier. He appears in the episode "Cold Comfort" where he gets Jubilee's help to rescue his girlfriend Lorna Dane (not called Polaris here) from a government facility that is housing X-Factor. After learning that Lorna is engaged to Havok, Iceman receives Xavier's apology for not being a good father figure to him. Iceman was also seen in many flashbacks which include "Sanctuary (part 1)" and "Xavier Remembers". In X-Men '97, he appears in the episode "Remember It", having traveled to Genosha where he was working as an ice cream vendor.
- Moira MacTaggert (voiced by Lally Cadeau in the original series, Martha Marion in X-Men '97) – An ally and old lover of Charles Xavier, she is a geneticist and an expert in mutant affairs. In X-Men '97, she appears in the episode "Remember It", as a member of the council of Genosha until she is killed in the Wild Sentinel attack.
- Banshee / Sean Cassidy (voiced by Phillip Williams in the original series, David Errigo Jr in X-Men '97) – Moira's fiancé who possesses a superhuman scream. In X-Men '97, he appears in the episode "Remember It", as a member of the council of Genosha before he is killed in the Wild Sentinel attack.
- Colossus / Piotr Rasputin (voiced by Robert Cait) – A mutant who can transform his body into organic steel which grants him super-strength. The X-Men helped Colossus when he was framed for crimes committed by Juggernaut. He later comes to them when Omega Red is attacking Russia. In X-Men '97, Colossus was in Genosha when Bastion's Wild Sentinel laid waste to the country, with Illyana being one of the victims. In his grief, he joins Exodus' Accolytes and kidnap Graydon Creed, for him to face justice on Savage Land. He eventually defects from the group and returns to the X-Mansion.
- Dazzler / Alison Blaire (voiced by Jennifer Dale) – Dazzler appears as a background character in "Mojovision" and is central to the plot of "Dark Phoenix Saga (Part 1): Dazzled". Dazzler appears in the X-Men '97 episode "Remember It", where she is killed in the attack on Genosha.
- Lilandra Neramani (voiced by Kristina Nicoll in the original series, Morla Gorrondonna in X-Men '97) – The empress of the Shi'ar and Charles Xavier's lover.
- Phoenix (voiced by Jennifer Dale) – The Phoenix Force is a cosmic entity that possesses Jean Grey in the multi-part Phoenix Saga. Rather than destroying an inhabited system, the animated adaptation had her destroy a deserted system and only disable the attacking Shi'ar cruiser. After the Phoenix left Jean's body, Jean retained her original powers, whereas, in the aborted comic book ending, she would have been lobotomized by the Shi'ar.
- Magik / Illyana Rasputina (voiced by Tara Strong in the original series, Courtenay Taylor in X-Men '97) – Illyana appeared in the episode "Red Dawn". In that episode, she and her mother remained by the side of Colossus and the X-Men as they fought the newly released Omega Red. She also appeared in one of Cable's visions of the altered timestream in "Time Fugitives", in which, without the antibodies developed to fight Apocalypse's techno-organic virus, many mutants, like Illyana, developed harmful mutations that killed them. In X-Men '97, Magik appears in the episode "Strange Land, Savage Heart" where she was present during the Genosha massacre and was killed by Bastion's Wild Sentinel trying to save people.
- Silver Fox – Silver Fox appeared in the episode "Weapon X, Lies & Videotape". In this continuity, she too was a member of Team X, Wolverine's lover, and a victim of the Weapon X program.
- Maverick / Christoph Nord (voiced by Crispin Freeman in X-Men '97) – Maverick appeared in the episode "Weapon X, Lies & Videotape", searching for answers about his past and his involvement with Weapon X, teaming with Wolverine, Sabretooth, and Silver Fox. In the episode "Whatever It Takes", Morph briefly transforms into Maverick to taunt Wolverine. Maverick also appears in flashbacks that depict himself and Wolverine battling Omega Red. In the X-Men '97 episode "Weapon X, Lies and DVDs" he joins Wolverine, Morph, Sabretooth and Lady Deathstrikre to investigate an abandoned Weapon X facility on the Arctic, where he is killed by a Brood hive Weapon X was experimenting.
- Darkstar / Laynia Petrovna (voiced by Elizabeth Rukavina) – Darkstar guest-starred in the episode "Red Dawn". She is initially the mutant enforcer for a group of rogue Russian generals seeking to reestablish the Soviet Union with the aid of Omega Red. After witnessing the crimes committed by Omega Red, Darkstar rebels against the generals and sides with the X-Men and Colossus.
- Lord Araki (voiced by Gavin Hammon) – The chancellor of the Shi'ar Empire.
- Longshot (voiced by Rod Wilson) – Longshot appears in the episodes "Mojovision" and "Longshot". In the animated series, it seemed to indicate that he might have a relationship with Spiral.
- Ka-Zar / Kevin Plunder (voiced by Robert Bockstael) – An ally of the X-Men who lives in the Savage Land. Ka-Zar appeared in the episodes "Reunion" and "Savage Land, Strange Heart".
  - Zabu – Ka-Zar's Smilodon companion.
  - Shanna (voiced by Megan Smith) – Shanna is Ka-Zar's wife.
- Warlock (voiced by David Corban) – Warlock's history was altered so that he came to Earth to escape his destiny of merging with the Phalanx.
- Cannonball / Sam Guthrie – Cannonball appeared along with his sister Paige Guthrie in the episode "Hidden Agenda".
- Captain America / Steve Rogers (voiced by Lawrence Bayne in the original series, Josh Keaton in X-Men '97) – Captain America appears in the episode "Old Soldiers". He is an American agent, sent along with the Canadian Wolverine, to rescue a scientist kidnapped by the Red Skull and the Nazis. He is present in the episode only in Wolverine's flashbacks. He was also seen in a cameo appearance in the episode "Red Dawn". In X-Men '97, he appears for the first time in the present day, in the episode "Bright Eyes". He is seen confronting Rogue while both are searching for Gyrich and Trask following the Wild Sentinel attack on Genosha. In the episode "Tolerance Is Extinction – Part 3", he and Iron Man protected Robert Kelly from Bastion's Prime Sentinels.
- Ms. Marvel / Carol Danvers (voiced by Roscoe Handford) – Ms. Marvel appears in the episode "A Rogue's Tale" (season 2), where she haunts Rogue for stealing her powers and leaving her in a coma.
- Scarlet Witch / Wanda Maximoff (voiced by Susan Roman) – The Scarlet Witch made both a guest and a cameo appearance. She appeared in the episode "Family Ties" along with Quicksilver when they tried to find out who their father was.
- Mjnari – Mjnari is a mutant with superhuman speed and Storm's godson. He appears in the episode "Whatever It Takes", where he is possessed by the Shadow King.
- Darrell Tanaka (voiced by Denis Akiyama) – A mutant healer in the mutant town of Skull Mesa. He is a series-original character.
- Cody Robbins – Cody Robbins was Rogue's boyfriend until she inadvertently put him in a coma with her powers. He makes a flashback appearance in the episode "A Rogue's Tale" and appears in the present in the episode "Love in Vain", where he joins the Colony in a bid to reunite with Rogue.
- Trish Tilby (voiced by Donna J. Fulks) – A reporter for NPR-TV news. In the episode "Tolerance is Extinction", Tilby is converted into a Prime Sentinel by Bastion.
- Goblin Queen / Madelyne Pryor (voiced by Catherine Disher in the original series, Jennifer Hale in X-Men '97) – A mutant clone of Jean Grey created by Mister Sinister and the mother of Cable. It was revealed by Beau DeMayo that Jean and Madelyne were switched during the events of the four-part episode "Beyond Good and Evil". In the episode "Fire Made Flesh", Sinister brainwashed her into the Goblin Queen and she unleashed Demons upon the X-Men, then took baby Nathan and went back to Sinister. Eventually Jean was able to free Madelyne from Sinister's control and together they rescued Nathan. In the episode "Remember It", Madelyne joined the council of Genosha and was killed by the Wild Sentinel.
- Nina Da Costa (voiced by Christine Uhebe) – The mother of Sunspot who appears in X-Men '97.
- Ford (voiced by Jeff Bennett) – The butler to the Da Costa family. He was turned into a Prime Sentinel by Bastion.
- Thunderbolt Ross (voiced by Michael Patrick McGill) – A high-ranking United States military officer, first seen in X-Men '97.
- Mother Askani / Rachel Summers (voiced by Gates McFadden) – Rachel appears in "Beyond Good and Evil" (part 4) as one of the psychics and telepaths abducted by Apocalypse. She and the other abductees were freed by the X-Men. In X-Men '97, Rachel is now known as Mother Askani, leader of Clan Askani.
- Black Widow / Natasha Romanova (voiced by Lake Bell) – A Russian spy and partner of Captain America, first seen in X-Men '97. An alternate version of her appeared in the original series episode "One Man's Worth".
- Garrison Kane (voiced by Ben Pronsky) – After returning to the 1990s from the future, Wolverine recruited his old buddies for a raid on the Weapon X Facility. On the approach, their helicopter was hit and crashed, killing Kane on the impact.

== Neutral characters ==
Eson the Searcher (voiced by Matthew Waterson) – Eson the Searcher is one of the Celestials, a cosmic race from the stars. In X-Men '97, Eson knew that En Sabah Nur and a group of time-displaced X-Men would arrive one day in Egypt, so he hid his ship in the desert, which became known as a lost temple. After Nur's birth, Eson watched over him from the stars. Eventually, Xavier, while attempting to probe information about the lost temple from Genral Logos' mind, was contacted by Eson. Nur and the time-displaced X-Men found the temple's location thanks to Eson calling out to Nur. Once Nur saw his destiny on Ship's walls, he touched a Death Seed, which transported him to another dimension face-to-face with Eson. Eson's Death Seed then turned Nur into Apocalypse. In the episode "Survival of the Fitest", Rogue entered Ship's Celestial shrine and spoke with Eson, who granted her the power to defeat an Apocalypse-possessed Gambit through another Death Seed. The cost was her life; however, Nightcrawler soon offered his own life to Eson instead of hers.

=== Neutral groups ===
==== Starjammers ====
The Starjammers appear in the five-part episode "Phoenix Saga" led by Corsair (Major Christopher Summers). In this episode, the Starjammers attack the X-Men and steal the M'Kraan Crystal, in hopes of trading into D'Ken so that Corsair can get close enough to kill him. However, D'Ken knew of their plan and tricked them, and got hold of the M'Kraan Crystal. The Starjammers have to work with the X-Men to destroy D'Ken. Hepzibah, Raza Longknife, Ch'od, and Cr'reee were the Starjammers that appeared along with Corsair in the "Phoenix Saga". Corsair later appeared in the episode "Orphan's End". In this episode, Corsair is on the run from a corrupt Shi'ar police officer and he comes to Earth. Later, he finds out that Cyclops is his son. They first accuse Storm of being a traitor and attack her. After she explains to the Starjammers what is happening, they help Cyclops and Corsair defeat the officer.

==== Acolytes ====
The Acolytes appear in the "Sanctuary" storyline, in which Magneto builds Asteroid M as a haven for all mutants to live away from the hatred of baseline humans. The Acolytes, led by Fabian Cortez, aided Magneto in the liberation of the Genoshan mutant slaves from the hands of the Genoshan magistrates. After Cortez betrays Magneto and he is believed to have been killed by the X-Men, the Acolytes pledge their loyalty to Cortez, though they turn on him after he is later exposed. In X-Men '97, the Acolytes are reformed under Exodus in the episode "Strange Land, Savage Heart", in the wake of Magneto's death.

- Fabian Cortez (voiced by Jeffrey Max Nicholls) – Cortez is the leader of the Acolytes. However, Cortez's extreme anti-human sentiments led him to betray Magneto. Cortez threatened to destroy Earth but was stopped by the X-Men and Amelia Voght, who revealed Cortez's betrayal to the other Acolytes and the entire mutant population of Asteroid M. He was trapped in Asteroid M by a vengeful Magneto, but was rescued from its destruction by Apocalypse and Deathbird. Cortez later appears in "The Fifth Horseman", now turned into a servant and worshipper of Apocalypse.
- Amelia Voght (voiced by Sheila McCarthy and Sally Cahill in the original series, Donna J. Fulks in X-Men '97) – Amelia Voght is a nurse who met Charles Xavier after he was crippled by Magneto. In X-Men '97, Voght appears in the episode "Bright Eyes", serving as a nurse in the aftermath of the Wild Sentinel attack on Genosha.
- Marco Delgado
- Carmella Unuscione (voiced by Eve Crawford) – Unuscione appeared in episode "Sanctuary" as a prominent member of the Acolytes. As in the mainstream Marvel Universe, she was a devoted and passionate follower of Magneto and his beliefs.
- Chrome / Allen Marc Yuric
- Joanna Cargill – Cargill appeared in the episode "Sanctuary". Though she did not have any speaking lines, she was a prominent member of the Acolytes. She also had a cameo in the first part of "One Man's Worth", where she was a member of the Mutant Resistance, but retained her Acolyte outfit.
- Burner / Byron Calley (voiced by Paul Haddad) – Burner appeared as a member of the Acolytes and, using his real name in the two-part episode "Sanctuary", was one of the many mutants that took Magneto's offer to live in Asteroid M. Calley was in charge of overseeing the defensive missiles Magneto had gathered to prevent an attack on the asteroid. When Fabian Cortez attempted to fire the missiles to destroy Earth, Calley opposed him. It was also revealed that he was an old friend of Gambit.
- Exodus / Bennet du Paris (voiced by Bo Poraj) – Exodus appears in X-Men '97, as the second leader of the Accolytes. He kidnaps Graydon Creed during his presidential campaign, ordering X-Factor to release captive mutants, or else Creed would be executed. The X-Men travel to his base on Savage Land and he agrees to have Nightcrawler put his half-brother through a trial, with Colossus being the judge. Before Colossus can give the final verdict, Exodus intervenes and attempts to kill Creed, dueling Nightcrawler in the process. Exodus is killed when Creed shoots him.

==== Morlocks ====
The Morlocks are a group of mutants who live underground due to their mutations being too severe to hide. In X-Men '97, the Morlocks relocate to Genosha, where members Callisto, Leech, Ape, Erg, and Tommy are killed by the Wild Sentinel.

- Callisto (voiced by Jennifer Dale in the original series, Courtenay Taylor in the revival series) – The leader of the Morlocks.
- Annalee (voiced by Kay Tremblay) – A Morlock who can manipulate the minds of others.
- Masque – A Morlock who can transform others via physical contact.
- Sunder (voiced by Dan Hennessey) – A Morlock who possesses superhuman strength and durability.
- Leech (voiced by Ron Rubin in the original series, David Errigo Jr. in the revival series) – A Morlock who can drain the powers of others.
- Tommy (voiced by Donna J. Fulks) – A Morlock who can become two-dimensional.
- Plague (voiced by Judy Marshak) – A Morlock who can inflict plagues.
- Erg – A Morlock who can absorb and redirect energy.
- Tar Baby – A Morlock who can generate an adhesive, tar-like substance.
- Ape (voiced by Ross Petty) – A Morlock who possesses an ape-like appearance and shapeshifting abilities.
- Mole – A Morlock who possesses mole-like digging abilities.
- Scaleface – A Morlock who can transform into a dragon-like creature.
- Glowworm – A Morlock who possesses a worm-like appearance and the ability to manipulate kinetic energy.
- Caliban – A Morlock who possesses pale skin and the ability to sense the presence of other mutants.
- Marianne – A green-skinned Morlock who is exclusive to the series.

==== Shi'ar Imperial Guard ====
The Shi'ar Imperial Guard appeared in the episodes "Phoenix Saga" and "Dark Phoenix Saga". In the "Phoenix Saga", the Imperial Guards track down Lilandra and the M'Kraan Crystal, following D'Ken's orders, but after D'Ken fuses with the M'Kraan Crystal and Lilandra becomes empress, the Imperial Guards help the X-Men and the Starjammers defeat D'Ken. Later, in "Dark Phoenix Saga", the Imperial Guards seek to destroy the Phoenix after she destroys an uninhabited star system.

In X-Men '97, the Shi'ar Imperial Guard first appears in the episode "Lifedeath, Part 2" on a mission to stop Ronan the Accuser during the Kree-Shi'ar War.

- Gladiator / Kallark (voiced by Richard Eden in the original series, David Errigo Jr. in the revival series) – A Strontian member of the Imperial Guard who possesses immense strength and durability.
- Oracle / Sybil – A telepathic Shi'ar and member of the Imperial Guard.
- Starbolt – An unidentified alien and member of the Imperial Guard who possesses flight and energy projection.
- Smasher / Vril Rokk – An unidentified alien and member of the Shi'ar Imperial Guard with super-strength.
- Manta – An unidentified alien and member of the Shi'ar Imperial Guard who possesses flight, infrared vision, and generation of blinding light flashes.
- Titan – An unidentified alien and member of the Shi'ar Imperial Guard who possesses size-shifting abilities.
- Hussar – An unidentified alien and member of the Shi'ar Imperial Guard who can generate electricity.
- Quake – An unidentified reptilian alien and member of the Shi'ar Imperial Guard who possesses geokinesis.
- Hobgoblin / Shifter – A Chameloid shapeshifter and member of the Shi'ar Imperial Guard.
- Warstar / B'nee and C'cil – Two symbiotically linked mechanoids who are members of the Shi'ar Imperial Guard. While the small one known as B'nee has electrokinesis, the large one known as C'cil has super strength and durability.
- Vulcan / Gabriel Summers – He appears in the revival series as the Shi'ar Imperial Guard's latest member.

=== Assassins Guild ===
- Bella Donna Boudreaux (voiced by Susan Roman in the original series, Rachel Kimsey in X-Men '97)
- Julian Boudreaux

=== Sandstormers ===
The Sandstormers were a group of raiders in the Ancient Egypt of 3000 BC. They were led by Baal, who was also a father figure to outcast mutant En Sabah Nur.

- Baal (voiced by Michael Dorn)

== Villains ==
- Apocalypse / En Sabah Nur (voiced by John Colicos in 1993 of the original series, James Blendick in 1994–1997 of the original series, Ross Marquand in X-Men '97, Adetokumboh M'Cormack as a younger En Sabah Nur in X-Men '97) – Apocalypse wants to pit humans and mutants in war and rule the stronger race. His first appearance is part of a plot line revolving around an offer to "cure" mutations. It is eventually revealed to be a trick to transform mutants into the Horsemen of Apocalypse. Apocalypse also appears in a storyline revolving around Cable. In this story, Apocalypse masquerades as a member of the Friends of Humanity, creating a techno-organic virus. In Cable's future (3999 A.D.), Apocalypse still wages his war against humanity and mutant-kind, opposed by Cable and his Clan Chosen. In X-Men '97, Apocalypse steals Gambit's corpse and resurrects him as his Horseman of Death, only for Gambit to kill Apocalypse. It is revealed that Apocalypse transferred his consciousness into Gambit's body. Rogue, empowered by Eson, seals Apocalypse in a crystal.
- Mister Sinister / Nathaniel Essex (voiced by Christopher Britton) – Interested in the creation of more powerful mutants, Sinister had an obsession with Cyclops and Jean Grey, as well as other powerful mutants such as Magneto. He was served both by the Nasty Boys and the Savage Land Mutates. In this version, Sinister is unconnected to by Apocalypse.
- Shadow King / Amahl Farouk (voiced by Maurice Dean Wint) – Xavier defeated Shadow King and his psychic essence was trapped in the Astral Plane. He escaped briefly and possessed Storm's godson Mjnari to possess Storm. The Shadow King was defeated and trapped once again only to be released after Professor X suffered an accident which left his mind vulnerable to the Shadow King's attempts to take possession of Xavier and leave his mind trapped in the Astral Plane.
- Sabretooth / Graydon Creed Sr. (voiced by Don Francks in the original series, Darin De Paul in X-Men '97) – A longtime enemy of Wolverine and the father of Graydon Creed through Mystique. In this show, Sabretooth is depicted as a henchman for Magneto and was referred to as Graydon Creed Sr. instead of Victor Creed where he often picked on Graydon. In the earlier mainstream comics, however, Sabretooth and Magneto have never come together in any real capacity. In X-Men '97, he joins Wolverine and Morph on a mission at an abandoned Weapon X facility in the Acrtic.
- Omega Red / Arkady Rossovich (voiced by Len Doncheff in the original series, Darin De Paul in X-Men '97) – Omega Red appeared in the episode "Red Dawn". In this episode, he is resuscitated by three corrupt generals who want to recreate the Soviet Union and rule it. Colossus, with the help of the X-Men, fights to save his country and its fragile freedom from these forces of tyranny. Omega Red later reappeared in "A Deal With the Devil". In this episode, he is thawed and sent two miles (3 km) beneath the ocean to salvage a disabled, toxic, nuclear submarine threatening to break up near Hawaii. He also appeared in Wolverine's flashbacks, in which Team X fights against Omega Red and manages to freeze him. The details of their confrontation are unclear, as Wolverine's memories were altered to make him believe Omega Red killed Maverick and Silver Fox.
- Sentinels – The Sentinels (voiced by David Fox and Barry Flatman in the original series, Eric Bauza in X-Men '97) are mutant-hunting robots created by Bolivar Trask and Henry Gyrich.
  - Master Mold (voiced by David Fox and Nigel Bennett in the original series, Eric Bauza in X-Men '97) is a larger Sentinel unit that mass-produces Sentinels.
- Nimrod – In the animated continuity, Nimrod came from the "Days of Future Past" timeline, where Bishop is its contemporary. Nimrod follows Bishop into the past to stop him from preventing the assassination of Senator Kelly which causes the future timeline. With the help of Storm's powers, Bishop was able to defeat Nimrod on numerous occasions.
- Bolivar Trask (voiced by Dan Hennessey in the original series, Gavin Hammon in X-Men '97) – Trask is the creator of the Sentinels, and was much longer-lived than his comic counterpart, returning for several episodes (one of which ironically featured him on the run from his creations, along with Gyrich). In X-Men '97, Trask rebuilds the Sentinels with help from a lobotomized version of Master Mold. The X-Men are later contacted by Trask who is in Madripoor. When Rogue drops Trask to his death, he instead transforms into a Prime Sentinel who is defeated by Cable.
- Henry Peter Gyrich (voiced by Barry Flatman in the original series, Todd Haberkorn in X-Men '97) – Gyrich appeared in the episode "Night of the Sentinels". He later appeared in the season one finale "The Final Decision", the episode "Courage" (season 4), and the series finale "Graduation Day". Gyrich's personality in the series was an extreme take on that of his appearances in the Avengers and X-Men comic books as he supported mutant oppression, and possibly even extinction, whereas in the comics he was merely distrustful of superhumans in general. In the series finale, Gyrich attacks Professor X at a conference, causing his powers to overload and leaving him near death, until he is stopped by security. In X-Men '97, Gyrich is killed by Bastion.
- Graydon Creed (voiced by John Stocker in the original series, Ben Pronsky in X-Men '97) – A member of the Friends of Humanity. He is later expelled from the group and unsuccessfully attempts to re-join them by killing Mystique and Nightcrawler. In X-Men '97, Creed runs for president against Kelly, only to be kidnapped by Magneto's Accolytes. Creed is imprisoned in the Savage Land and placed on trial, with Nightcrawler as his defendant. Creed later wins the election and becomes president.
- Trevor Fitzroy (voiced by Stephen Russell) – Fitzroy was a guest-star in the two-part episode "One Man's Worth". Fitzroy, known as "the mutant traitor", under the orders of Master Mold, travels back in time to 1959 to murder Charles Xavier.
- D'Ken (voiced by Maurice Dean Wint) – D'Ken was seen in the five-part "Phoenix Saga", where his history was very much like it was in the comics. He was also responsible for the death of Cyclops' parents, and him becoming an orphan on Earth. D'Ken gained control over the M'Kraan Crystal, which gave him powers. D'Ken had fused with the M'Kraan Crystal, so after the Phoenix fixed the crack that D'ken made on the crystal to gain its power, D'Ken was trapped inside it. The Phoenix later hid the crystal in the heart of the Sun.
- Erik the Red / Davan Shakari (voiced by Lawrence Bayne) – Erik the Red was sent by D'ken to capture Lilandra and the M'Kraan Crystal for him.
- Zaladane (voiced by Lisa Dalbello) – Zaladane was featured in the two-part episode "Savage Land, Strange Heart". The high priestess of Garokk, Zaladane recruits Sauron into her scheme to awaken the god.
- Garokk (voiced by David Calderisi) – Garokk was featured in the two-part episode "Savage Land, Strange Heart".
- Deathbird / Cal'syee Neramani (voiced by Cari Kabinoff) – Deathbird made several appearances in the original series. In flashbacks, she was seen at D'Ken's side when Christopher and Katherine Summers were abducted. Following Lilandra's ascension to the throne of the empire, Deathbird sought to overthrow her sister and install herself as Majestrix, for which she joined Apocalypse. However, Apocalypse was merely using Deathbird for his plans. During the episode "Beyond Good and Evil", she attacked Lilandra alongside Apocalypse. However, he abandoned her at the mercy of Lilandra and Imperial Guard Praetor Gladiator. Apocalypse simply wanted a distraction so he could kidnap Oracle, the psychic of the Imperial Guard. In X-Men '97, she first appears in the episode "Lifedeath – Part 2", where she confronts Ronan the Accuser before being informed of her sister's marriage plans to Charles Xavier.
- Juggernaut / Cain Marko (voiced by Rick Bennett) – Juggernaut fully appeared in three episodes: "The Unstoppable Juggernaut", "The Phoenix Saga, Part III: The Cry of the Banshee", and "Juggernaut Returns". He attempted to get revenge on Xavier in all three episodes.
- Mojo (voiced by Peter Wildman in the original series, David Errigo Jr. in X-Men '97) – A creature from another dimension, Mojo kidnapped the X-Men, hoping to use them as the stars of his reality TV action show. Placing them in holographic worlds and making them fight for their lives, Mojo cared little about their safety. He was stopped after Longshot betrayed him, and the X-Men were returned to their home world. He later came to Earth to stop Longshot and once again make the X-Men the stars of his TV show, but he was once again sent packing. In X-Men '97, Mojo decided to pivot his media empire to video games, abducting Jubilee and Roberto Da Costa in an attempt to use them as entertainment for his slaves.
- Spiral / Rita Wayword (voiced by Cynthia Belliveau in the original series, Abby Trott in X-Men '97) – Spiral works for Mojo and helps him torture the captured X-Men by making them perform in television shows against their will but eventually betrays Mojo when she meets and falls in love with Longshot. Their relationship, however, takes a turn for the worse, and Spiral once again turns to Mojo's side in the end.
- Black Tom Cassidy (voiced by Phillip Williams) – Cassidy teamed up with Juggernaut to kidnap Lilandra in the "Phoenix Saga". He and Banshee are referred to as brothers in the series continuity, with Banshee being the elder. In the comics, Banshee and Cassidy are cousins.
- Cameron Hodge (voiced by Brett Hasley in season 1, Gary Crawford in "The Phalanx Covenant") – Cameron Hodge is introduced as a lawyer for Hank McCoy. Hodge later appears as an ambassador working for the Genoshan government. After the corrupt government was overthrown by the combined efforts of Cable and the X-Men, Hodge, who was now missing an arm and a leg courtesy of Cable, vowed to get revenge on the mutants. Restoring his missing limbs and granting him a fraction of their power, the Phalanx promise to help Hodge get revenge, and, in exchange, he would help them assimilate Earth.
- Purple Man / Zebediah Killgrave (voiced by Colin Fox) – The Purple Man appeared in the fourth episode of season five, "No Mutant Is an Island", as a telepathic mutant terrorist who plans on taking over the government using a group of young mutants under his mental control. In the end, the X-Man Cyclops gets in his way and eventually defeats him.
- High Evolutionary / Herbert Wyndham (voiced by Robert Bockstael) – The High Evolutionary is the Master of Wundagore. He seeks to create a superior generation of his New Men by using mutant DNA, mutating humans into beast-like beings, instead of experimenting on animals. He sets up a trap to capture Magneto, Quicksilver, and the Scarlet Witch, revealing to the twins that they are Magneto's children. He also appeared in a flashback, in which he fights Garokk and traps his essence underground in the Savage Land.
  - New Men – The New Men are the humanoid animal followers of the High Evolutionary.
- Arkon (voiced by Paul Haddad) – Arkon appeared in the episode "Storm Front". In the series, Arkon unleashes terrible weather conditions over Washington, D.C., to get Storm's attention. It works and he begs her to return with him to his planet, Corsus, to save it from meteorological chaos, which threatens his people. After much pleading, Arkon convinces Storm. Intrigued by this dynamic leader but slightly suspicious, Storm departs, but leaves a clue for the other X-Men to follow. Once Storm saves the planet, she is proclaimed savior throughout this universe, and Arkon asks her to marry him. Later, she finds out that his ships are bringing thousands of slaves from nearby planets and knows that Arkon is a tyrant.
- Proteus / Kevin McTaggart (voiced by Stuart Stone) – Proteus appeared in the two-part episode "Proteus" (season 4), which was based on 1979–1980 Uncanny X-Men storyline. In the episode, he escapes from Muir Island to find out who his father is which creates havoc around the city, and the X-Men have to stop him.
- Red Skull / Johann Schmidt (voiced by Cedric Smith) – The Red Skull appears in the episode "Old Soldiers". He appears in Wolverine's flashbacks when Wolverine remembers his past. Red Skull had kidnapped a scientist and was working for the Nazis.
- Silver Samurai / Kenuicho Harada (voiced by Denis Akiyama) – Silver Samurai appeared in the episode "The Lotus and the Steel". He is given little characterization in the episode, reduced to a mere gang leader whose thugs terrorize a village where Wolverine has been living. The villagers stand their ground and Wolverine bests the samurai in single combat by taking advantage of the Samurai's habit of teleporting behind him. Wolverine anticipates the move and disables the teleportation device, humiliating Samurai.
- Phalanx – The Phalanx appears in the episode "The Phalanx Covenant". They are a techno-organic, extraterrestrial race bent on assimilating every other lifeform. They invade the Earth, though they are initially unable to assimilate mutants. This version of the Phalanx is an amalgamation of the comics Technarchy and Phalanx.
- Valerie Cooper (voiced by Catherine Disher) – A United Nations official and ally of the X-Men. Cooper was introduced in X-Men '97. Cooper is later revealed to be a member of Operation Zero Tolerance. In the episode "Tolerance is Extinction", Cooper regroups with Bastion and has a crisis of conscience, which leads her to release the imprisoned Magneto, as she finally realizes that Magneto was right all along about human and mutant coexistence being an impossible achievement. In the second season, she and the X-Factor began hunting innocent mutants. She gets into conflict with Xavier and the X-Men, until she was killed by Mystique who took her form and replaced her.
- Adversary (voiced by Alison Sealy-Smith) – An owl-like demon who feeds on negative emotions.
- Ronan the Accuser (voiced by Todd Haberkorn) – Ronan appears in the X-Men '97 episode "Lifedeath", where he battles against Deathbird and the Shi'ar Imperial Guard.
- Ozymandias (voiced by Tony Amendola) – Ozymandias is a loyal servant of Apocalypse in Cable's future in X-Men '97.
- Rama-Tut / Kang the Conqueror / Nathaniel Richards (voiced by John de Lancie) – Nathaniel Richards is a man from the future who time-travelled to the year 3000 A.D in Egypt, where he used his futuristic technology to become the pharaoh Rama-Tut as seen in X-Men '97. He sought to find the Celestial Ship and to use its technology to empower himself before En Sabah Nur could do so. After failing to beat Nur to the Ship, Rama-Tut considered his efforts in the Ancient Egypt complete and leaves that time period.
  - General Logos (voiced by Christopher Britton) – General Logos was Rama-Tut's commander of the army. He was killed by En Sabah Nur, after failing to bring information about the Pharaoh's plans.
- Danger (voiced by Rachel Kimsey) – In the X-Men '97 episode "Danger.exe", the Danger Room obtained sentience when it started to believe the X-Men are too weak to take on the evolving threats to mutantkind following Magneto's death. With help from Xavier and Bishop, she is destroyed when Polaris unlocks her full potential.

=== Villain teams ===
==== Brotherhood of Mutants ====
The Brotherhood of Mutants in this series is based on the third incarnation of the team from the comic books. The group is led by Mystique, with the Blob, Avalanche, and Pyro as members of the group, and Rogue being shown as a former member. The group is revealed to have been initially financed by the mutant Apocalypse though only Mystique knew this. Notably absent from the series was the Brotherhood member and Mystique's longtime lesbian lover Destiny who was a major member of the team in the comics. As such, major changes were made to the series' adaptation of the "Days of Future Past" storyline, in which Destiny played a major role during the climax of the story.

- Mystique / Raven Darkholme (voiced by Randall Carpenter in 1993 and X-Men '97, Jennifer Dale in 1994–1996) – Mystique was shown as the leader of the Brotherhood, a close ally of Apocalypse, Rogue's foster mother, and Nightcrawler's birth mother. In the first season, Mystique aids Apocalypse in transforming several mutants into his Horsemen. Later he orders her to assassinate Senator Kelly, a task for which she impersonates the X-Man Gambit. She fails due to the interference of the real Gambit. In the second season, Mystique attempts to convince Rogue to return to the Brotherhood, though she fails in the end. Mystique once again appears as an ally of Apocalypse in the "Beyond Good and Evil" storyline; however, when Magneto realizes how mad Apocalypse's intentions are, Mystique joins him in trying to stop Apocalypse. In her final appearance of the series, Mystique is kidnapped by Graydon Creed, her child with Sabretooth. She is forced to send a letter to her other son, Nightcrawler, to lure him into a trap in exchange for her life. Creed attempts to kill all the mutants, but they escape. As Mystique flees, Nightcrawler gives chase because he wants to know why she abandoned him. Even though Mystique coldly tells him that she does not want him, Nightcrawler cannot bring himself to hate her and tells her that he will pray to God to allow him to forgive her. Touched that despite her cold treatment her son still cares for her, Mystique saves Nightcrawler from Creed and is presumed dead, but survives as she emerges from the river a distance from Nightcrawler and Rogue. In X-Men '97, she kills Valerie Cooper and takes her form.
- Avalanche / Dominic Petros (voiced by Rod Coneybeare) – Avalanche was always accompanied by Pyro and Blob. He usually acts as a hired henchman of Mystique.
- Pyro / St. John Allerdyce (voiced by Graham Halley) – He appeared in four episodes (although he only had lines in three). He was characterized as British (instead of Australian like the comics), using slang terms such as "old bean" and "old girl" in conversation.
- Blob / Fred Dukes (voiced by George Merner) – In the first season, he was one of many mutant captives on Genosha. He later appeared in several episodes with the Brotherhood.

==== Friends of Humanity ====
The Friends of Humanity (FoH) is an anti-mutant group that does various attacks on mutants. They were formed when Robert Kelly turned away from the anti-mutant cause and had Graydon Creed as a member until the information about him being Sabretooth's human son was revealed.

- X-Cutioner / Carl Denti (voiced by Lawrence Bayne) – The new leader of the Friends of Humanity and a former United Nations agent. In the second season, he joins the Purifiers.

==== Nasty Boys ====
While the Nasty Boys are minor villains in the comics, the team was featured several times in the series. Appearing first in the episode "Til Death Do Us Part", the series featured four of the Boys: Ruckus, Gorgeous George, Hairbag, and Slab. Morph serves as a temporary member of the Nasty Boys after being brainwashed by Mister Sinister. The X-Men eventually free Morph from Sinister completely and defeat Sinister and the Nasty Boys. The Nasty Boys reappear in "Beyond Good and Evil", with Vertigo joining the group.

- Gorgeous George (voiced by Rod Wilson) – A member of the Nasty Boys who possesses an elastic, tar-like body.
- Ruckus (voiced by Dan Hennessey) – A member of the Nasty Boys who can manipulate sound.
- Slab – A member of the Nasty Boys who can manipulate his size.
- Hairbag (voiced by John Blackwood) – A member of the Nasty Boys who possesses poisonous breath and the ability to fire drugged quill-like hairs from his body.

==== Savage Land Mutates ====
The Savage Land Mutates were the creations of Magneto, though they were later recruited by Mister Sinister.

- Sauron / Karl Lykos (voiced by Robert Bockstael) – A native of the Savage Land who Sinister experimented on and gave the ability to absorb mutant energy and transform into a humanoid Pteranodon. After Sinister is defeated, Lykos is left to live in peace after mutants leave the Savage Land, leaving him unable to transform, and joins Ka-Zar's tribe.
- Brainchild (voiced by Robert Bockstael) – A Swamp Man with an enlarged cranium who possesses psychic powers.
- Amphibius (voiced by Peter McCowatt) – A Swamp Man who was mutated into a humanoid frog.
- Lupo – A Swamp Man who was mutated into a white wolf-like form.
- Barbarus (voiced by Bob Zeidel in the first appearance, Peter McCowatt in later appearances) – A Swamp Man who was mutated to have four arms.
- Vertigo (voiced by Megan Smith) – Vertigo was one of the followers of Mr. Sinister in the Savage Land. In the series, her powers were amplified after Sinister genetically modified her with Magneto's DNA. Later on, she joins the Nasty Boys who were also working for Mister Sinister.

In the X-Men '97 episode "Bright Eyes", Brainchild and Amphibius appeared at Gambit's funeral.

==== Inner Circle Club ====
The Hellfire Club appeared in the "Dark Phoenix Saga" storyline, though it was renamed Inner Circle Club to prevent controversy regarding the use of the word hellfire, which could have prompted accusations of satanism. The Inner Circle's leaders aim to control Jean Grey and brainwash her into believing herself to be the Queen of the Inner Circle, though they only manage to unleash the Dark Phoenix.

- Sebastian Shaw (voiced by David Bryant in the original series, Travis Willingham in X-Men '97) – leader of the Inner Circle Club. In X-Men '97, he appears in the episode "Remember It" as a member of the ruling council of Genosha, where he is killed in the Wild Sentinel attack.
- Emma Frost (voiced by Cynthia Dale in the original series, Martha Marion in Season 1 of X-Men '97, Zehra Fazal in Season 2 of X-Men '97) – The White Queen of the Inner Circle Club. In X-Men '97, Frost joins the ruling council of Genosha and survives the Sentinels' attack on the island by unlocking the ability to transform into organic diamond. In the second season, she runs a nightclub.
- Mastermind / Jason Wyngarde (voiced by Nigel Bennett) – Wyngarde appears in the first three parts of the "Dark Phoenix Saga". He uses his powers to control the Phoenix but ends up unleashing the Dark Phoenix. Wyngarde is also a member of the Mutant Resistance in the alternate reality shown in the first part of the episode "One Man's Worth".
- Black Bishop / Harry Leland (voiced by Geoff Kahnert)
- Donald Pierce (voiced by Walker Boone)

==== Horsemen of Apocalypse ====
The Four Horsemen of Apocalypse were the same ones as in the X-Factor comics. The lineup was composed of mutants that submitted themselves to the so-called mutant "cure", developed by Dr. Adler (Mystique in disguise). The cure process transformed the four mutants: Autumn Rolfson / Famine (voiced by Catherine Gallant), Plague / Pestilence, Abraham Kieros / War (voiced by James Millington in the original series, Lawrence Bayne in X-Men '97), and Archangel / Death into altered mutants under the control of Apocalypse.

The four-part episode "Beyond Good and Evil" featured another team of Horsemen, created by Apocalypse during his time in Ancient Egypt. The style of these Horsemen reflected their Egyptian origins.

In X-Men '97, a futuristic team of horsemen appear in the episode "Days of Past Future", consisting of Decimus Furius / War, Sanjar Javeed / Death, Jeb Lee / Famine, and Ichisumi / Pestilence. In the present, War was interrogated by X-Force. After Psylocke reads War's mind, Cable has Archangel kill War.

==== Reavers ====
The Reavers are a gang of cyborgs. They appear alongside Lady Deathstrike when she goes down to the Morlock's tunnel and tricks Wolverine into coming down there, hoping to get him to open an alien ship that she found in the tunnel. When the ship is opened, an alien comes out of the ship and sucks the life out of the Reavers. So Lady Deathstrike has to work together with Wolverine to defeat the alien. In the end, the X-Men defeat the alien and all the Reavers' life energy is sent back to their bodies.

- Bonebreaker
- Pretty Boy
- Murray Reese
- Wade Cole
- Lady Deathstrike / Yuriko Oyama (voiced by Jane Luk in the original series, Erika Ishii in X-Men '97) – Lady Deathstrike was also a Reavers member. She had a romantic past with Wolverine, likely merging her character with Wolverine's former fiancée, Mariko Yashida. She first appeared in the episode "Out of the Past" (season 3). Deathstrike joined the Reavers and became a cyborg to avenge the death of her father, Professor Oyama.

==== Weapon X ====
The Weapon X program was responsible for Wolverine's adamantium skeleton and fabricated memories. The program was directed by the Professor and Abraham Cornelius. Weapon X captured the four members of Team X (Logan, Victor Creed, Maverick, and Silver Fox) to brainwash them to become an elite team of mind-controlled assassins. However, Wolverine escaped and his rampage through the Weapon X headquarters allowed Creed, Maverick, and Silver Fox to escape. In the X-Men '97 episode "Weapon X, Lies, and DVDs", when Weapon X found a Brood specimen preserved by the arctic cold, they began experiment with it in order to more effectively wipe the minds of their test subjects. The Brood eventually got out and killed or infected everyone in the facility.

- Professor - He appears in video and flashbacks.
- Abraham Cornelius (voiced by Todd Haberkorn in X-Men '97) - He was seen in shadows within video and flashbacks. In the X-Men '97 episode "Weapon X, Lies, and DVDs", Abraham Cornelius was found to have been possessed by a Brood.
- Talos – Talos is based on the character Shiva. However, due to network censorship, the robot's name was changed to Talos.

==== Mojo's Trackers and Wildways ====
Besides Spiral, Mojo employs several agents and servants:

- Major Domo
- Arize
- Gog
- Quark
- Warwolves

==== The Colony and Brood ====
The Colony, loosely based on the Brood, are reptilian aliens with mechanical tentacles and the ability to generate electricity from their tails. Additionally, the Colony can generate spores that transform others into Brood drones. In the episode "Love in Vain", the Colony arrive on Earth in an Acanti vessel, intending to use the X-Men as host bodies to propagate the species. However, Professor X manages to free the Acanti from the Colony's control. The Acanti safely returns the X-Men to Earth before leaving for space.

In the X-Men '97 episode "Weapon X, Lies, and DVDs", Weapon X finds a Brood specimen preserved by the Arctic cold and experiments with it in order to more effectively wipe the minds of their test subjects. The Brood eventually escape and kill or infect everyone in the facility. Wolverine, Morph, Sabretooth, and Lady Deathstrike destroy the Brood before they can escape the facility.

==== Children of the Shadow ====
The Children of the Shadow

The Children of the Shadow are a group of mutant criminals. Cyclops battles them when he visits the mutant town of Skull Mesa.

- Solarr / Bill Braddock (voiced by Lorne Kennedy) – The leader of the Children of the Shadow. In this show, Solarr goes by the name of Bill Braddock.
- Chet Lambert (voiced by Tom Harvey) – Exclusive to the TV series, Chet Lambert is a mutant who possesses intangibility.
- Toad / Mortimer Toynbee (voiced by Tony Daniels) – A member of the Children of the Shadow. He possesses toad-like abilities.

==== The Avengers (in the Xavier-less time-line) ====
- Captain America
- Iron Man / Tony Stark
- Giant Man / Hank Pym
- Wasp / Janet van Dyne
- Black Widow / Natasha Romanoff
- Hercules
- Scarlet Spider / Ben Reilly
- Daredevil / Matt Murdock

==== Operation: Zero Tolerance ====
Operation: Zero Tolerance (OZT) is a United Nations anti-mutant strike force that appeared in X-Men '97. It is responsible for turning humans into Prime Sentinels, cyborgs who were injected with Mister Sinister's techno-organic virus, transforming them into Sentinel hybrids. In Cable's timeline, after 300 years of Evolutionary War, Bastion succeeded in creating a utopia for the new post-humans, in which the surviving mutants were pressed into slavery.

- Bastion / Sebastion Gilberti (voiced by Theo James) – The leader of OZT, who was born a Sentinel hybrid after Nimrod infected his father.
- Daria (voiced by Anjali Bhimani) – Bastion's assistant.
- Doctor Doom / Victor von Doom (voiced by Ross Marquand) – The dictator of Latveria who allies with Operation: Zero Tolerance. He was credited as "Latverian Politician" in the end credits.
- Helmut Zemo (voiced by Rama Vallury) – A supporter of Operation: Zero Tolerance.
- Prime Sentinels – A group of people-turned-cyborgs with Sentinel traits. Bolivar Trask, Trish Tilby, and the Da Costa family's butler Ford were converted into Prime Sentinels.
  - Rose Gilberti (voiced by Kari Wahlgren) – The mother of Bastion who was converted into a Prime Sentinel.

==== Purifiers ====
The Purifiers are an anti-Mutant terrorist group of Christian fundamentalists led by Reverend William Stryker in X-Men '97.

- William Stryker (voiced by J.P. Karliak) – Stryker is an anti-mutant Christian minister and leader of the Purifiers.
- Sister Anne (voiced by Adrienne Barbeau) - A member of the Purifiers.

== Cameo appearances (heroes and villains) ==
- War Machine (James Rhodes), Sunfire, Doctor Strange, Captain Britain, and Spider-Man had a cameo appearance in the "Phoenix Saga".
- Domino (voiced by Jennifer Dale), Feral, Rictor, and Thunderbird were seen as slaves on "Slave Island". Domino also had a cameo appearance in the episode "Repo Man".
- Kangaroo, Random, Arclight, Blockbuster, and Black Panther (T'Chaka) had a cameo appearance in the two-part episode "Sanctuary".
- Ghost Rider appeared briefly as a memory in one of Gambit's flashbacks in the episode "Final Decision".
- Deadpool – Morph briefly transforms into Deadpool. Deadpool's face is also seen in a flashback while Professor X is probing the mind of Sabretooth. In the "Phoenix Saga", an evil psychic projection of Xavier also created an illusion of Deadpool while tormenting Wolverine.
- Moondragon, Stryfe, Typhoid Mary, Gamesmaster, Karma, Mesmero, Kwannon, and Gremlin had a cameo in the episode "Beyond Good and Evil (part 4)".
- Immortus / Nathaniel Richards had a cameo after he was revealed as the true identity of Bender, the Axis of Time custodian.
- Eternity, Uatu the Watcher, and Thor had a cameo appearance in the "Dark Phoenix Saga" (part 3).
- Nick Fury, G. W. Bridge, and War Machine are seen in the episode "Time Fugitives (part 1)" aboard the S.H.I.E.L.D. Helicarrier watching a U.S. Senate committee hearing on mutants being blamed for infecting non-mutants with a "mutant plague" (genetically engineered by Apocalypse masquerading as a member of the Friends of Humanity). War Machine is also briefly seen earlier in this episode in the year 3999 AD, fighting against Cable and his allies.
- Hulk made a cameo as one of Xavier's robots in "The Juggernaut Returns".
- Punisher is shown on a video game cover in the episode "Days of Future Past (Part 1)" and as a robot in the episode "Mojovision".
- Senyaka, Forearm, Reaper, Strobe, Tommy, Slither, and Copycat appear as background extras in the episode "Secrets, Not Long Buried" as inhabitants of Skull Mesa alongside several mutants exclusive to the series like Andrew and Nicole (who can generate crystal), Watchdog (a dog-like mutant with telepathy and power-negating abilities), and an unnamed woman who can control plants.
- Daredevil can be seen as a dartboard in the episode "No Mutant Is an Island".
- Howard the Duck can be seen on Beast's T-shirt in the episode "The Phoenix Saga, Part Two: The Dark Shroud"
- Members of Technet, composed of Gatecrasher, Bodybag, China Doll, Fascination, Ferro, Joyboy, Ringtoss, Waxworks, and Yap appear in a pub in Scotland in "Proteus (part 1)".
- Super-Skrull is briefly seen among the audience in the stadium in the episode "Mojovision".
- Artie Maddicks makes a cameo appearance in the episode "Graduation Day" among the mutant army Magneto assembles on Genosha.
- Dust, Maggott, Stacy X, Nature Girl, and Loa made photographic cameos in the X-Men '97 episode "To Me, My X-Men",
- Marrow, Pixie, Gentle, Glob Herman, Gargouille, Cipher, Squid-Boy, Rain Boy, and Nature Girl appear as residents of Genosha in the X-Men '97 episode "Remember It".
- Pierre, Bobby, Angel Salvadore, and Mimic made cameo appearances at Gambit's funeral and the aftermath of the Genosha massacre in the X-Men '97 episode "Bright Eyes".
- Crimson Dynamo, Cloak and Dagger, Iron Man, Mary Jane Watson, and Flash Thompson make cameo appearances in the X-Men '97 episode "Tolerance is Extinction – Part 3".
- Quentin Quire (voiced by Thomas Dekker), Eye-Boy, Synch (voiced by Zeno Robinson), M (voiced by Miatta Ade Lebile), the Stepford Cuckoos, Chamber, Anole, Wing (voiced by Christopher Barger), and Beak appear in the X-Men '97 episode "A Force to Be Reckoned With" as captives of X-Factor. They go on to become students at the Xavier Institute.
