= Storm in other media =

Appearances of Storm in cinema, television and video games

Adaptations of Storm in other media
- Original source: Comics published by Marvel Comics
- First appearance: Giant-Size X-Men #1 (May 1975)

Films and television
- Film(s): X-Men (2000); X2 (2003); X-Men: The Last Stand (2006); X-Men: Days of Future Past (2014); X-Men: Apocalypse (2016); Dark Phoenix (2019)
- Television show(s): X-Men: The Animated Series (1992); X-Men: Evolution (2000); Wolverine and the X-Men (2008); Marvel Anime: X-Men (2011); X-Men '97 (2024); What If...? (2024)

Games
- Video game(s): X-Men (1992); X-Men: The Ravages of Apocalypse (1997); X-Men: Mutant Academy (2000); X-Men Legends (2004)

This is a list of all media appearances of the Marvel Comics character Storm.

== Television ==
Storm as depicted in X-Men: The Animated Series (left), X-Men: Evolution (center) and Wolverine and the X-Men (right)
- Storm appears in Spider-Man and His Amazing Friends, voiced initially by Kathy Garver and later by Anne Lockhart.
- Storm appears in X-Men: Pryde of the X-Men, voiced by Andi Chapman.
- Storm appears in X-Men: The Animated Series, voiced initially by Iona Morris for the first season and the first seven episodes of the second, and subsequently by Alison Sealy-Smith. This version usually chants a spell-like phrase pertaining to a specific element to activate her powers, is a dear friend of Rogue, displays no romantic attraction towards Forge, and serves as second-in-command of Professor X's X-Men. In her most notable appearances, she is called upon by Arkon to save his planet, Polemachus, from a disaster she unknowingly caused before realizing he is a tyrant, returns to Africa to save her spiritual son Mjanari from the Shadow King, and is captured by Sauron and forced to use her powers to further his plans. Additionally, in the two-part episode "One Man's Worth", an alternate reality incarnation of Storm displays a romantic interest towards her version of Wolverine.
- Storm appears in X-Men '97, voiced again by Alison Sealy-Smith. Storm remains a member of the X-Men, but loses her powers when the X-Cutioner shoots her with a weapon neutralising her powers. She leaves the X-Men and is approached by Forge, who offers to restore her powers. The two form a connection until Forge reveals it was a device of his design that neutralised her powers. When attempting to leave, the pair are attacked by the demonic Adversary, but Storm defeats the demon, regains her powers, and returns to the X-Men.
- Storm appears in Spider-Man: The Animated Series, voiced again by Alison Sealy-Smith in the consecutive episodes "The Mutant Agenda" and "Mutant's Revenge" and again by Iona Morris in the three-part episode "Secret Wars".
- Storm appears in X-Men: Evolution, voiced by Kirsten Williamson. This version is a member of the X-Men, teacher at the Xavier Institute, the aunt of Spyke, has a sister named Vivian, and maintains a greenhouse near the campus. Additionally, in her younger years, she was tormented by Houngan, an evil African shaman who seeks to take over Africa. Towards the end of the series, Storm is brainwashed by Apocalypse, who enhances her powers and recruits her into his Horsemen until she is eventually restored.
- Storm appears in Wolverine and the X-Men, voiced by Susan Dalian. This version sports a variation of her Uncanny X-Men/Fantastic Four suit and initially appears as a member of the X-Men before they disband following Professor X and Jean Grey's mysterious disappearances in the episode "Hindsight". Additionally, she was previously in a relationship with Angel. In the episode "Overflow", the comatose Professor X shows Wolverine a vision of the future wherein Storm destroys Africa. Having reunited some of the X-Men, Wolverine leads them in traveling to Africa to avert the vision, saving Storm from the Shadow King in the process, after which Storm rejoins the X-Men.
- Storm appears in The Super Hero Squad Show, voiced by Cree Summer. This version is a student, later graduate, of the Xavier Academy, temporary member of the titular Super Hero Squad, and girlfriend of the Black Panther.
- Storm appears in Black Panther, voiced by Jill Scott.
- Storm appears in Marvel Anime: X-Men, voiced by Aya Hisakawa in the Japanese version and Danielle Nicolet in the English dub. This version's design is based on Halle Berry's portrayal.
- Storm appears in Marvel Disk Wars: The Avengers, voiced by Yayoi Sugaya in the Japanese version and again by Danielle Nicolet in the English dub.
- An alternate universe variant of Storm who wields Mjolnir appears in What If...?, voiced again by Alison Sealy-Smith.

== Film ==
Storm as portrayed by Halle Berry in X-Men: The Last Stand (left) and Alexandra Shipp in X-Men: Apocalypse (right)
- Storm appears in the X-Men film franchise.
  - She first appears in X-Men (2000), portrayed by Halle Berry. This version is a member of the X-Men and professor at the Xavier Institute who assists in their efforts to stop Magneto's Brotherhood of Mutants and their plot to turn humanity into mutants. In this film, Storm has a Kenyan accent.
  - Storm appears in X2, portrayed again by Halle Berry. She and Jean Grey recruit Nightcrawler into the X-Men before the former joins forces with him to rescue Professor X from Colonel William Stryker.
  - Storm appears in X-Men: The Last Stand, portrayed again by Halle Berry. Storm assumes leadership of the X-Men following Professor X's apparent death and leads them in protecting Alcatraz from the Brotherhood and their violent opposition against a "mutant cure". In a deleted scene, she and Logan share a kiss.
  - A young Storm makes a cameo appearance in the teaser trailers for and a deleted scene from X-Men Origins: Wolverine, portrayed by April Elleston Enahoro.
  - A young Ororo Munroe makes a cameo appearance in X-Men: First Class, portrayed by an uncredited actor.
  - Storm appears in The Wolverine via a photograph.
  - Storm appears in X-Men: Days of Future Past, portrayed again by Halle Berry. She works with the X-Men to avert a post-apocalyptic, Sentinel-controlled future. Though she is killed in the process, the X-Men succeed, restoring her position at the Xavier Institute.
  - A separate depiction of a young Storm appears in X-Men: Apocalypse, portrayed by Alexandra Shipp. She is recruited by Apocalypse, who enhances her powers and permanently turns her hair white, to serve as a member of his Horsemen. Under the belief that they are saving the world, Storm serves him until she witnesses him abandon Archangel for failing him and subsequently defects to the X-Men to help them defeat Apocalypse.
  - Storm appears in Logan via a comic book cover illustrated by Dan Panosian.
  - Storm makes a cameo appearance in Deadpool 2, portrayed again by Alexandra Shipp.
  - Storm appears in Dark Phoenix, portrayed again by Alexandra Shipp. She's an official member of the X-Men.
- Storm makes a non-speaking cameo appearance in Next Avengers: Heroes of Tomorrow, in which she and the Black Panther have a son named Azari, who inherited her electrokinesis.
- Storm will appear in the untitled MCU X-Men film (2028), portrayed by Maya Boyd.

== Video games ==
- Storm appears as a playable character in The Uncanny X-Men.
- Storm appears in X-Men.
- Storm appears in Spider-Man and the X-Men in Arcade's Revenge.
- Storm appears in X-Men: Children of the Atom, voiced by Catherine Disher.
- Storm appears as a playable character in X-Men: Gamesmaster's Legacy.
- Storm appears in X-Men vs. Street Fighter, voiced again by Catherine Disher.
- Storm was planned to appear as a playable character in the unreleased X-Women: The Sinister Virus.
- Storm appears in as an assist character in Marvel vs. Capcom: Clash of Super Heroes.
- Storm appears in X-Men: The Ravages of Apocalypse.
- Storm appears as a playable character in Marvel vs. Capcom 2: New Age of Heroes, voiced by Catherine Disher.
- Storm appears in X-Men: Mutant Academy.
- Storm appears as a playable character in X-Men: Mutant Academy 2, voiced again by Alison Sealy-Smith.
- Storm appears in X-Men: Next Dimension.
- Storm appears in X-Men Legends, voiced by Cheryl Carter.
- Storm appears in X-Men Legends II: Rise of Apocalypse, voiced by Dawnn Lewis.
- Storm appears as a playable character in Marvel Nemesis: Rise of the Imperfects, voiced by Estelle Liebenberg.
- Storm appears as a non-playable character in X-Men: The Official Game, voiced by Debra Wilson.
- Storm appears as a playable character in Spider-Man and Friends: Doc Ock's Challenge.
- Storm appears as a playable character in Marvel: Ultimate Alliance, voiced again by Dawnn Lewis.
- Storm appears as an assist character in the PS2 and PSP versions of Spider-Man: Web of Shadows, voiced by Tangie Ambrose.
- Storm appears as a playable character in the PS2, PSP, and Wii versions of Marvel: Ultimate Alliance 2, voiced again by Dawnn Lewis. This version supports Captain America in opposing the Superhuman Registration Act.
- Storm appears as a playable character in Marvel Super Hero Squad, voiced again by Cree Summer.
- Storm appears in LittleBigPlanet via the "Marvel Costume Kit 4" DLC.
- Storm appears as a playable character in Marvel vs. Capcom 3: Fate of Two Worlds and Ultimate Marvel vs. Capcom 3, voiced again by Susan Dalian.
- Storm appears as a playable character in Marvel Super Hero Squad Online, voiced by Grey DeLisle.
- Storm appeared as a playable character in Marvel Avengers Alliance.
- Storm appears as a playable character in Marvel Avengers: Battle for Earth, voiced again by Danielle Nicolet.
- Storm appears as a playable character in Marvel Heroes, voiced again by Danielle Nicolet.
- Storm appears as a playable character in Lego Marvel Super Heroes, voiced again by Danielle Nicolet.
- Storm appears as a playable character in Marvel Puzzle Quest.
- Storm appears as a playable character in Marvel: Future Fight.
- Storm appears as a playable character in Marvel Powers United VR, voiced by Kimberly Brooks.
- Storm appears as a playable character in Marvel Ultimate Alliance 3: The Black Order, voiced by Mara Junot.
- Storm appears in Marvel Snap.
- Storm appears as a playable character in Marvel Super War.
- Storm appears as a playable character in Marvel Future Revolution, voiced again by Kimberly Brooks. Additionally, several alternate reality incarnations of Storm appear as NPCs, such as one from an Earth that was colonized by Asgardians and one who became a thrall of Dormammu.
- Storm appears as an unlockable outfit in Fortnite Battle Royale.
- Storm appears as a playable character in Marvel's Midnight Suns via the "Blood Storm" DLC, voiced again by Mara Junot.
- Storm appears as a playable character in Marvel Rivals, voiced again by Mara Junot.
- Storm appears as a playable character in Marvel Mystic Mayhem, voiced again by Mara Junot.
- Storm appears as a playable character in Marvel Cosmic Invasion, voiced again by Alison Sealy-Smith.
- Storm will appear as a playable character in Marvel Tokon: Fighting Souls, voiced by Miyuki Sawashiro in Japanese and again by Mara Junot in English.

== Miscellaneous ==
- Storm appears in Marvel Super Hero Island via the "Storm Force Accelatron" attraction.
- Storm appears in the Marvel Knights: Wolverine versus Sabretooth motion comic, voiced by Kathleen Barr.
- Storm appears in American television commercials for M&M's and Visa Check cards.
- Storm is referenced in the Nicki Minaj song "Chun-Li".
- Storm appears in Marvel Universe Live!.

== Merchandise ==
- In 1996, Storm received figures in McDonald's Marvel Superheroes Happy Meal promotion.
- Storm received a figure in The Classic Marvel Figurine Collection.
- Storm received several figures in Toy Biz's 1991 X-Men line, the X-Men: Evolution tie-in line, and the X-Men film franchise tie-in line.
- Storm in her mohawk design received a figure in Hasbro's Marvel Universe line via the Secret Wars collection.
- Marvel Legends has released multiple figures of Storm. Storm in her mohawk and leather jacket in the 2018 Apocalypse Build-A-Figure wave; in her Jim Lee white uniform in the 2019 X-Men Retro wave; in her Giant Size X-Men uniform in the 2020 two-pack with Thunderbird; in her white uniform based on X-Men '97 in 2023; in her Uncanny X-Men look in the X-Men 60th anniversary boxset; and Bloodstorm in the 2024 Blackheart Build-A-Figure wave.
- Storm received figures in the Marvel Minimates line based on her original 1990s outfit and her Ultimate Marvel incarnations.
- Storm received Kubrick figures as part of the Marvel Super Heroes (Series 1) (2001) and X-Men (2004) sets.
- Storm received statues from Bowen Designs and Sideshow Collectibles.
- Storm has multiple figures made by HeroClix, included in their Uncanny X-Men, X-Men House of X, X of Swords, and X-Men: The Animated Series' The Dark Phoenix Saga lines.
- Funko has created multiple pieces of merchandise of Storm in their Pop!, Dorbz, and Mystery Minis lines.
- In 2022, Storm received a figure as part of Hasbro VHS cassette-style packaging inspired by X-Men: The Animated Series.
- Lego featured Storm in their Marvel Series 2 minifigure theme.

== See also ==
- X-Men in other media
