= Storm (X-Men: The Animated Series and X-Men '97 character) =

Animated version of Marvel Comics superhero

- X-Men: The Animated Series / X-Men '97 character
- Promotional art of Storm as she appears in the first season of X-Men '97 by Amelia Vidal
- First appearance: "Night of the Sentinels (Part 1)"; (October 31, 1992)
- Based on: Storm by: Len Wein; Dave Cockrum
- Voiced by: Iona Morris (X-Men: The Animated Series season one) (Note: Nicky Guadagni first voiced the character in the first season, but the recordings were never aired.); Alison Sealy-Smith (X-Men: The Animated Series seasons 2–5; X-Men '97; What If...?) (Note: Sealy-Smith would later replace all of Morris' lines for re-runs.)

In-universe information
- Species: Human mutant
- Gender: Female
- Affiliation: X-Men
- Powers and abilities: Weather control

Storm (Ororo Munroe) is a fictional superheroine appearing in the American animated superhero series X-Men: The Animated Series—which aired on Fox Kids from 1992 to 1997—its comic-book continuation X-Men '92, which was published by Marvel Comics from 2015 to 2022—and its revival X-Men '97, which has been streaming on Disney+ since 2024. Storm is introduced as an X-Men member and is based on the Marvel Comics character of the same name. Storm is a mutant with the ability to control the weather, summoning lightning, wind, and extreme temperatures.

Introduced in the pilot episode Night of the Sentinels, Storm first rescues Jubilee from Sentinels. She was initially voiced by actress Nicky Guadagni, before her replacement by Iona Morris. Morris was replaced in the second season by Alison Sealy-Smith who would voice her character for the remainder of the series and its revival, as well as What If...? Season 3, in which she voices an alternate universe variant of Storm who wields Mjolnir.

Throughout the series, Storm is shown as a regal, powerful character, often delivering verbose speeches during battle. She has a close friendship with Jean Grey and has been shown in relationships with Forge and Wolverine. (Note: In an alternate future shown in One Man's Worth.)

== Development ==
Storm was initially voiced by Nicky Guadagni, a white actress, but due to the creative team feeling that the character would better be played by a black actress, American actress Iona Morris was hired for subsequent episodes of season one. Series producer Haim Saban had Morris replaced by Barbadian-born Canadian actress Alison Sealy-Smith to avoid paying Morris residuals for reruns of the show. Sealy-Smith has stated that her background in performing Shakespeare has helped her with the role, particularly Storm's habit of speeches. Sealy-Smith has expressed her love for the character due to her past experiences of racism.

Sealy-Smith has expressed interest in a feature-length animated X-Men project.

Storm's abilities were reportedly hard to animate and write into the series, due to the grandiose, large nature of her capabilities.

== Characterization and appearances ==
Storm's background and characterization are largely based on her comic counterpart. Born Ororo Munroe, Storm hails from Africa, and at a young age was living in Cairo as a thief for the Shadow King. When the Shadow King was sealed away by Professor X, Storm was freed from his influence. She later moved to Kenya, where her mutant powers to control the weather emerged, and she was worshipped as a goddess. Around this time, she saved the life of another woman's newborn child, Mjnari, becoming the child's godmother.

Storm's mutant abilities allowed her to manipulate the weather. She could create extreme temperatures, summon wind, snow and lightning, and fly on the wind. Her lightning strikes were powerful enough to turn sand to glass. In X-Men '97 season 2, she gains further control of her abilities, even controlling a solar flare.

She is depicted as having claustrophobia.

=== X-Men: The Animated Series ===
Storm debuts in the pilot episode of X-Men: The Animated Series, "Night of the Sentinels (Part 1)". She rescues Jubilee from Sentinels alongside Rogue.

Throughout the series, Storm defeats Callisto in battle and becomes the leader of the Morlocks, rescues her godson Mjnari from the returned Shadow King in her home of Africa, and is courted by Arkon who asks for her help in calming the raging storms on his planet, only for Storm to leave him when she realises his people are enslavers of other races. An alternate future version of Storm is in a relationship with Wolverine and is part of a mutant resistance in a timeline where Xavier was assassinated as a young man. She and Wolverine join Bishop and Shard in their travel to the past to prevent this future.

=== X-Men '97 ===
Storm appears in the animated revival of the original series, debuting in the pilot episode and still voiced by Alison Sealy-Smith. Storm retains her white outfit, but now has a long mohawk resembling her look in the 1980s. She joins the X-Men in battling Sentinels and the Friends of Humanity.

During Magneto's trial at the United Nations, Storm is shot with a power-neutralizing weapon by the X-Cutioner, stripping her of her powers. Storm is distraught and leaves the X-Mansion.

She travels for a while before meeting Forge, who offers to help restore her powers, setting up the Lifedeath storyline. She accompanies him to his home in the desert where he uses technology to restore her powers, and the pair grow close. Forge eventually reveals he created the mutant dampening technology, including the collars and the weapon that removed Storm's powers. Outraged, Storm leaves on horseback, only to be stalked by a demonic presence and magically brought back to the home.

The demon reveals itself to be the Adversary, a spirit with ties to Forge. It bites Forge, poisoning him with a magical ailment. Storm tends to Forge's wounds, only for him to tell Storm of a species of cactus his people wrote of that could cure him. Storm goes to the caves in which the cacti grow, all while being taunted by the Adversary and experiencing claustrophobia. She wills herself to continue, eventually regaining her powers, destroying the Adversary and gaining a costume based on her Giant Size X-Men debut. She returns to the X-Mansion after the destruction of Genosha, where she embraces Jean Grey. She joins the X-Men on their mission to defeat Bastion and Mister Sinister. During the final confrontation on Asteroid M, Storm uses her abilities in conjunction with Jean's to slow the asteroid's descent to Earth. She, alongside the rest of the team on the asteroid, are then displaced in time, with the rest of the team but Wolverine, Morph, and Storm shown in either the past or future.

Storm appears as one of the X-Men in the Apocalypse-ruled future in the second season of X-Men '97. She joins Clan Askani alongside Jean Grey, Cyclops, Wolverine, and Morph, to protect a young Nathan Summers. When Jean, Cyclops, and Nathan are captured by the Horsemen of Apocalypse, Storm utilizes her powers to command a solar flare to power Apocalypse's ship to rescue the trio. She helps defeat the Horsemen, consisting of Jeb Lee, Ichisumi, Decimus Furius, and Sanjar Javeed.

=== Other appearances ===
Storm appeared in the "Secret Wars" arc of Spider-Man: The Animated Series, voiced by Iona Morris. She appears alongside other members of the X-Men in the Fantastic Four episode "Nightmare in Green".

An alternate universe variant of Storm who wields Mjolnir appears in the third season of What If...?, voiced again by Alison Sealy-Smith.

== In other media ==
X-Men: The Animated Series was adapted into the comics X-Men Adventures and X-Men: The Manga, and loosely into X-Men '92, all featuring Storm as a main member of the X-Men team. The animated version of Storm was adapted into X-Men Cartoon Maker, and inspired her appearance in X-Men: Children of the Atom, which in turn would be the basis for the Marvel vs. Capcom series.

The animated version of Storm has received a share of merchandise, including Marvel Legends figures, Funko Pop! figures, and Mondo merchandise.

== Reception ==
Storm was ranked 4th in Collider's ranking of X-Men '97 characters, 6th on Dual Shocker's list and "X-Tier" on The Mary Sue's list.

== See also ==
- Storm in other media
- List of X-Men: The Animated Series and X-Men '97 characters
