= X-Men '97 season 2 =

X-Men '97
- Season 2
- Promotional poster
- Starring: Ray Chase; Jennifer Hale; Alison Sealy-Smith; Cal Dodd; J. P. Karliak; Chris Potter; Holly Chou; Gui Agustini; Naoko Mori; Christopher Barger; Matthew Waterson; Lenore Zann; George Buza; Adrian Hough; Ross Marquand; Isaac Robinson-Smith; Gil Birmingham; Carolina Ravassa
- No. of episodes: 9

Release
- Original network: Disney+
- Original release: July 1 – August 12, 2026

Season chronology
- ← Previous; Season 1

The second season of the American animated television series X-Men '97 is based on the Marvel Comics superhero team X-Men. The series is a revival of X-Men: The Animated Series (1992–1997), continuing the story of the X-Men. In the season, the X-Men are scattered throughout time—from Ancient Egypt to the far future—and must find their way back to the 1990s to stop Apocalypse. It was produced by Marvel Studios Animation, with Beau DeMayo as head writer and Jake Castorena as supervising director.

Ray Chase, Jennifer Hale, Alison Sealy-Smith, Cal Dodd, J. P. Karliak, Chris Potter, Holly Chou, Gui Agustini, Naoko Mori, Christopher Barger, Matthew Waterson, Lenore Zann, George Buza, Adrian Hough, Ross Marquand, Isaac Robinson-Smith, Gil Birmingham and Carolina Ravassa star as members of the X-Men and X-Force. Sealy-Smith, Dodd, Zann, Buza, and Hough reprised their roles from the original series. Work on the season began by July 2022, with DeMayo and Castorena returning. Voice recording began by February 2023, writing was completed by March 2024, and animation work was underway by then. DeMayo was fired by Marvel at that time and Matthew Chauncey was hired to replace him as head writer in July. Chauncey oversaw rewrites for the season.

The season premiered on the streaming service Disney+ on July 1, 2026, with its first three episodes. The other six episodes were released weekly until August 12. A third season was confirmed in March 2024.

== Episodes ==
No. overall	No. in season	Title	Directed by	Written by	Original release date
11	1	"Days of Past Future"	Emmett Yonemura	Brian Ford Sullivan	July 1, 2026
Forge and Bishop plan to rescue the X-Men, who have been sent to key moments during the life of Apocalypse: Bishop goes to the start of his reign in 3000 B.C. while Forge goes to the height of his power in 3960 A.D. Forge finds Wolverine, Storm, Morph, Cyclops, and Jean Grey. The last two decide to stay in the future with their son Nathan, but they are captured by Apocalypse's followers who wish to use Nathan as a new vessel for Apocalypse's consciousness. Mother Askani, who told Nathan he is destined to kill Apocalypse, reveals to the other X-Men that she transported them through time: one group to train Nathan in the future, and another to try to prevent the mutant En Sabah Nur from becoming Apocalypse in the first place. They rescue Cyclops, Jean, and Nathan, before attacking Apocalypse's base and freeing his captives. Apocalypse travels back in time to the 1990s, when he believes the X-Men are vulnerable. Nathan merges with Apocalypse's Ship computer, setting him on the path to becoming Cable. In the 1990s, Cable, Psylocke, and Archangel plan a new team to stop Apocalypse.
12	2	"A Force to Be Reckoned With"	Emmett Yonemura	Anthony Sellitti and Mariah Wilson	July 1, 2026
In the absence of the X-Men, Dr. Valerie Cooper fields a U.S. government-sanctioned team of mutants called X-Factor, featuring Havok, Polaris, Multiple Man, Strong Guy, and Wolfsbane. Cooper uses them to capture runaway young mutants who are hoping to seek shelter with the X-Men. Cable recruits Jubilee and Sunspot to join his own team, X-Force, and they track down War, one of Apocalypse's Horsemen. After Psylocke is unable to read War's mind, Archangel executes him on Cable's orders, devastating Jubilee. Deducing that War's mind was protected by Emma Frost, X-Force finds her and she leads them into a trap set by X-Factor. Jubilee is captured and interrogated by Havok and Polaris. She is imprisoned with the other young mutants, but is able to convince Polaris—who used to be a member of the X-Men—to help her escape. Jubilee fights off government soldiers, frees the other mutants, and gets them to X-Force who reluctantly agree to help. X-Force are branded fugitives by Cooper. In 3960 A.D., Nathan uses Ship's computer to send the future X-Men back to the 1990s.
13	3	"Rise of Apocalypse"	Chase Conley	Beau DeMayo and JB Ballard	July 1, 2026
14	4	"Rise of Apocalypse"	Chase Conley	Beau DeMayo and Anthony Sellitti	July 8, 2026
Part 1: In Ancient Egypt in 3000 B.C., En Sabah Nur leads an uprising against Pharaoh Rama-Tut, a tyrannical ruler who uses futuristic technology. Magneto attempts to impart Professor Charles Xavier's philosophy of peaceful co-existence on Nur, hoping to make him a benevolent force and rewrite history, but Xavier does not trust Nur and wants to focus on finding a way back to their own time. Beast, Rogue, and Nightcrawler fail to build a time machine using parts of Rama-Tut's technology. Magneto convinces Nur to spare the life of Rama-Tut's general Logos, despite Logos provoking Nur by revealing that he was Nur's former slave master. Xavier enters Logos's mind seeking answers about the pharaoh, and learns that Rama-Tut is searching for an ancient temple that holds celestial power which could get them home. When Nur and his followers discover the X-Men trying to use Rama-Tut's technology, Nur turns on them and executes Logos, returning to his own ideology: survival of the fittest. Bishop reveals himself to help fight off the attackers just as Rama-Tut destroys the base they are in. Part 2: Magneto protects the X-Men from the explosion, and Nur also survives. Xavier reveals their identities to Nur and convinces him to help find the temple. Rama-Tut telepathically warns Xavier about the ramifications of Nur finding the temple before him. When they find the temple, the X-Men realize it is the Ship that is destined to be used by Apocalypse. Seeing images of his powerful future, Nur turns on the X-Men and accepts this power from the Celestial Eson, transforming into Apocalypse. Beast uses parts of Ship to create a time travel device and Magneto sends the others back to the 1990s, although Apocalypse stops Xavier from leaving. Rama-Tut reveals himself to be Kang the Conqueror, abandons his aide Candra, and escapes in his own time machine. Apocalypse creates a black hole above the pharaoh's city which Magneto risks his life to stop. Apocalypse then kills Magneto in front of a devastated Xavier, who is later rescued by Bishop. In a mid-credits scene, Wolverine is back in the 1990s and receives a file on the Weapon X program from Captain America and Black Widow.
15	5	"Weapon X, Lies, and DVDs"	Chase Conley	Anthony Sellitti	July 15, 2026
Wolverine and Morph recruit members of the former's old hit squad Team X, consisting of Sabretooth, Lady Deathstrike, Maverick and Garrison Kane, to find a Weapon X facility and assassinate Dr. Abraham Cornelius. Their helicopter is downed by mutated birds and Kane dies in the crash. The others find the facility in ruins, infested with alien insects that have killed everyone. They see Cornelius mutate into one of the creatures. Morph, Sabretooth, and Lady Deathstrike learn the insects are the Brood, an alien hivemind that Cornelius wanted to use to control his test subjects. Wolverine is infected by the Brood while trying to restore his adamantium skeleton—the real reason he created this mission. The infected Wolverine kills Maverick and accidentally releases Omega Red. The others use the adamantium process to purge Wolverine of the Brood's infection, and he uses his restored adamantium claws to defeat Omega Red. The survivors escape from the facility as it explodes, destroying the Brood. Morph is saddened that Wolverine believes he is nothing without his claws.
16	6	"Danger.exe"	Emmett Yonemura	Beau DeMayo and Mariah Wilson and Bailey Moore	July 22, 2026
Xavier uses the Danger Room to relive Magneto's death, accidentally influencing the program to reduce its safety measures. Cooper dismisses Polaris from X-Factor due to her volatility, and she returns to Xavier's school for mutants. Xavier makes Storm the school's headmistress, and travels to the ruins of Genosha with Cyclops, Jean, and Beast. The Danger Room attacks some students, asserting that they need to be ready for greater threats, and taunts Polaris about her strained relationships with her father Magneto. Polaris attacks the room with enough power that it is able to take on a humanoid form, accidentally hurting some students in the process. Danger goes to Genosha and battles Xavier and the X-Men, besting them due to her knowledge of their powers. Polaris and Bishop follow her, and Xavier uses his positive memories of Magneto to encourage Polaris to embrace her power and defeat Danger. With the U.S. government banning the X-Men, Xavier decides to base the team at Genosha and establishes X-Corp. In Athens, Apocalypse resurrects Gambit to be one of his Horsemen.
17	7	"Strange Land, Savage Heart"	Emmett Yonemura	Brian Ford Sullivan and Beau DeMayo	July 29, 2026
When Graydon Creed announces his candidacy for U.S. president on an anti-mutant platform, he is abducted by Exodus and the Acolytes of Magneto. Nightcrawler, Rogue, Beast, Bishop, and Polaris go to the Acolytes' Savage Land base in Antarctica, where Colossus says they are building a peaceful life for mutants in honor of those who have died, including his sister Illyana. Nightcrawler explains that Creed is his half-brother and persuades Exodus to put him on trial with Colossus as judge. Nightcrawler argues that Creed is reacting to the abusive treatment he received from their mother Mystique and his father Sabretooth for being human. Exodus preempts Colossus's decision, attacking Creed but losing to Nightcrawler in a sword duel. Creed shoots Exodus, and Nightcrawler teleports Creed to the frozen wastes outside the Savage Land where he admonishes and abandons him. Colossus returns to the school and says he was not convinced by Nightcrawler's defense of Creed, who is recovered by X-Factor. In Athens, X-Force finds Apocalypse's corpse and one of Gambit's playing cards.
18	8	"The Dead Man's Hand"	Chase Conley and Emmett Yonemura	Brian Ford Sullivan, JB Ballard, Beau DeMayo and Anthony Sellitti	August 5, 2026
X-Force proposes an alliance with the X-Men to find Gambit, who returns to his home in New Orleans and brainwashes his friends and family. Gambit and his followers attack the X-Men and X-Force, with Gambit brainwashing Nightcrawler and kidnapping Rogue. Gambit tells Rogue that Apocalypse fell in love with Candra and gave her some of his power, making her the X-Ternal, but she abandoned him as revenge for what he did to her city. Gambit plans to use the power of the X-Ternal to allow Rogue to be with him forever. During a wedding ceremony, Gambit summons the X-Ternal, kills her, and gives her power to Rogue. The X-Men and X-Force arrive and fight with Gambit's followers, including Nightcrawler who overpowers them. Xavier enters Gambit's mind to find that Apocalypse's consciousness has control and is too strong for him. Rogue enters Gambit's mind and helps him take control back from Apocalypse, freeing his followers. After Cable attempts to kill the unconscious Gambit, Jubilee and Sunspot leave with the X-Men. Later, Cooper proposes an alliance between X-Force and X-Factor.
19	9	"Survival of the Fittest"	Chase Conley and Emmett Yonemura	Brian Ford Sullivan	August 12, 2026
Beast, Rogue, and Nightcrawler find Ship abandoned by Apocalypse, and Rogue uses it to speak with Eson. He removes the X-Ternal's power from her, but she convinces him to give her the power to stop Apocalypse and save Gambit in exchange for her life. X-Force and X-Factor attack X-Corp, attempting to get to Gambit's body. Cable shoots Gambit in the head and believes he has achieved his destiny, but this unleashes Apocalypse who transforms Gambit's body into a monstrous form and brainwashes all of the X-Men, X-Force, and X-Factor. Apocalypse taunts Xavier for relying on his fellow mutants, but Xavier is vindicated when Rogue arrives and uses her celestial powers to free Gambit and the others, and trap Apocalypse's consciousness inside a crystal that she gives to Cable. Rogue is surprised when she continues to live after her celestial powers subside, until Beast arrives and reveals that Nightcrawler offered his own life to Eson so Rogue and Gambit could be together. In a mid-credits scene, Mystique shoots Cooper and assumes her identity while Creed is elected president.

== Cast and characters ==
=== Main ===
- Ray Chase as Scott Summers / Cyclops
- Jennifer Hale as Jean Grey and Rahne Sinclair / Wolfsbane
- Alison Sealy-Smith as Ororo Munroe / Storm
- Cal Dodd as Logan / Wolverine
- J. P. Karliak as Morph
- Chris Potter as Nathan Summers / Cable
- Holly Chou as Jubilation Lee / Jubilee
- Gui Agustini as Roberto da Costa / Sunspot
- Naoko Mori as Betsy Braddock / Psylocke
- Christopher Barger as Warren Worthington III / Archangel
- Matthew Waterson as Erik "Magnus" Lehnsherr / Magneto and Eson
- Lenore Zann as Rogue
- George Buza as Dr. Henry "Hank" McCoy / Beast
- Adrian Hough as Kurt Wagner / Nightcrawler and Strong Guy
- Ross Marquand as Professor Charles Xavier and Apocalypse
- Isaac Robinson-Smith as Lucas Bishop
- Gil Birmingham as Forge
- Carolina Ravassa as Lorna Dane / Polaris

=== Recurring ===
- Rachel Kimsey as Ship, Danger, and Bella Donna Boudreaux
- Donna Jay Fulks as Trish Tilby
- Catherine Disher as Dr. Valerie Cooper
- Teddy Sears as Alex Summers / Havok
- Debra Wilson as Candra / X-Ternal

=== Notable guests ===
- Gates McFadden as Mother Askani
- Michael Johnston as young Nathan Summers
- Zehra Fazal as Emma Frost
- Lawrence Bayne as Abraham Kieros / War and Carl Denti
- Adetokumboh M'Cormack as En Sabah Nur
- Chris Britton as Logos
- John de Lancie as Rama-Tut / Kang
- Lake Bell as Natasha Romanova / Black Widow
- Josh Keaton as Steve Rogers / Captain America
- Todd Haberkorn as Dr. Abraham Cornelius
- Ben Pronsky as Garrison Kane and Graydon Creed
- Erika Ishii as Yuriko Oyama / Lady Deathstrike
- Crispin Freeman as Maverick
- Darin De Paul as Sabretooth and Omega Red
- Robert Cait as Piotr "Peter" Rasputin / Colossus
- Courtenay Taylor as Illyana Rasputin / Magik
- A. J. LoCascio as Remy LeBeau / Gambit and Bobby LeBeau
- Ron Rubin as Jamie Madrox / Multiple Man
- Randall Carpenter as Mystique

== Production ==
=== Development ===
X-Men '97, a revival and continuation of X-Men: The Animated Series (1992–1997), was announced by Marvel Studios Animation in November 2021. Beau DeMayo was set as head writer and executive producer, with Jake Castorena as supervising director and Charley Feldman as supervising producer. The Animated Series producer and director Larry Houston and showrunners Eric and Julia Lewald were consulting on the revival. Work on a second season had begun by July 2022. Chase Conley and Emmett Yonemura returned as directors from the first season.

DeMayo was fired by Marvel Studios in March 2024, following an investigation that led to "egregious" findings. The studio was searching for his replacement by then. In June 2024, Marvel told DeMayo that they would be removing his credits from the second season due to violations of his termination agreement; however, DeMayo still received creator, executive producer, and writing credits for the season. Matthew Chauncey, a writer on Marvel Studios's first animated series What If...? (2021–2024), was hired in July 2024 to replace DeMayo as head writer of the series moving forward. Houston and the Lewalds were made executive producers starting with the second season, serving alongside Marvel Studios's Brad Winderbaum, Kevin Feige, Louis D'Esposito, and Dana Vasquez-Eberhardt, and DeMayo. Castorena was a supervising producer for the season.

=== Writing ===
Writing on the second-season finale started by July 2023, and DeMayo had finished writing for the season by the time he was fired in March 2024. Other writers for the season included JB Ballard, Bailey Moore, Antony Sellitti, Brian Ford Sullivan, and Mariah Wilson. The season's scripts had reportedly been revised and rewritten by July 2024, with Chauncey overseeing rewrites.

As teased at the end of the first season, the second season features a storyline centered around the villain Apocalypse, and sees the X-Men scattered throughout time and needing to find their way back to the 1990s: Professor Charles Xavier, Magneto, Rogue, Nightcrawler, and Beast are in Ancient Egypt in 3000 B.C.; Cyclops and Jean Grey are in 3960 A.D. with future versions of their children; Bishop and Forge are in the 1990s, trying to get the X-Men back; and Storm, Wolverine, and Morph are initially unaccounted for. Julia Lewald likened this storyline to when Xavier and Magneto are trapped in the Savage Land in the second season of the original series, and said separating the X-Men allowed them to have fun with specific character groupings. Eric Lewald said the storyline allowed Apocalypse to be explored at different points in his life: his early years as En Sabah Nur in Ancient Egypt, when his path to becoming a villain begins; his attempts to "cull the herd of the weak so that only the strong survive" in the present day; and the far future where "his vision becomes reality, perhaps". Houston said the death of Gambit in the first season would continue to have a big impact in the second, and the character Polaris would have a pivotal character arc that impacts both the X-Men and X-Force. Rama-Tut, a variant of Kang the Conqueror, makes an appearance in the season despite that the Marvel Cinematic Universe (MCU)'s version of the character portrayed by Jonathan Majors was removed from the "Multiverse Saga" following Majors' December 2023 firing. Supervising producer Jake Castorena noted that Rama-Tut was always part of the season's script phase since its very early drafts, though he didn't know whether he was included by DeMayo and the writers' room to tie-in with Avengers: The Kang Dynasty before it was retooled into Avengers: Doomsday (2026) because there was always some level of synergy amongst the studios despite the show not being set within the MCU.

In September 2024, DeMayo stated that Marvel Studios had removed his planned tenth episode of the season and re-written the rest of the episodes to reflect this change. He explained that in his version of the scripts there had been hints throughout the season leading to the appearance of the character Onslaught in the tenth episode, which also included elements based on the comic book storyline Age of Apocalypse (1995). The episode would have ended with Gambit freeing Bishop from prison in an Age of Apocalypse timeline and the pair escaping from evil Cyclops in a similar scene to the Darth Vader hallway scene at the end of the Star Wars film Rogue One (2016). DeMayo opined that the decision to change his scripts came from directors and executives who believed they "know better than the comics" and added that "Marvel loves shooting themselves in the foot".

=== Casting and voice recording ===
Main voice actors returning from the first season include Ray Chase as Scott Summers / Cyclops, Jennifer Hale as Jean Grey, Alison Sealy-Smith as Ororo Munroe / Storm, Cal Dodd as Logan / Wolverine, J. P. Karliak as Morph, Lenore Zann as Rogue, George Buza as Dr. Henry "Hank" McCoy / Beast, Isaac Robinson-Smith as Lucas Bishop, Matthew Waterson as Erik "Magnus" Lehnsherr / Magneto, Ross Marquand as Professor Charles Xavier and Apocalypse, and Adrian Hough as Kurt Wagner / Nightcrawler.

Lawrence Bayne, who voiced Nathan Summers / Cable in the original series and Carl Denti / X-Cutioner in the first season, also returned for the second season. Gil Birmingham also returns as Forge from the first season. Michael Johnston voices a young Nathan Summers. The season's production brief revealed that Carolina Ravassa voices Polaris. DeMayo previously claimed in May 2025 that he had originally cast Neve Campbell in the role due to her status as a "'90s icon" and her amazing work in bringing something new. Josh Keaton returns to voice Steve Rogers / Captain America from the first season, while Lake Bell voices Natasha Romanoff / Black Widow; both voiced different versions of the characters in What If...?. Robert Cait and Randall Carpenter reprised their respective roles as Colossus and Mystique from the original series in the season.

Dodd revealed in February 2023 that he had started recording for the second season, while Zann had begun recording material for the season in August 2023. By May 2024, she had completed her work on the season except for additional dialogue recording (ADR). Despite the COVID-19 pandemic having less of an impact on the season's production, voice recording continued to take place remotely as with the first season due to many cast members being based in different locations.

=== Animation and design ===
Animation was provided by Red Dog Culture House, Tiger Animation and Jam Filled Entertainment. The 2D animation style of the original series was retained, but "slightly modernized" to improve the quality and reflect advances in animation since the 1990s; Castorena described the series as "fresh, but familiar". Winderbaum said there was a "code of ethics" they followed to align with the restrictions of the 1990s animation, but they occasionally broke this for dramatic effect. Animatics for the entire season had been created by March 2024.

The season's opening was altered for the second episode to say "X-Force" instead of "X-Men", given the episode was centered on the team. Waterson originally recorded Magneto's death at Apocalypse's hands in the third episode with the former being entirely alone in facing the latter, but the sequence was visually changed later on to have the fight be less nebulous and more direct as well include Professor X in the scene because it was deemed important to have one of Magnet's oldest and closest friends witness his demise. The X-Men wear costumes in the season based on those from Grant Morrison's New X-Men (2001) comics. DeMayo said the decision to change the costumes was based on the story and themes he was focused on for the season, noting that the costumes had "strong ties" to the fictional country Genosha and Morrison's "E Is for Extinction" storyline from New X-Men #115 which was adapted in the first season.

Morph's shape-shifting powers allow for cameo appearances by various Marvel characters, such as Thor and Deadpool.

=== Music ===
In April 2024, Taylor Newton Stewart confirmed that he and John Andrew Grush, known professionally as the Newton Brothers, were returning as composers for the second season. They had not yet begun writing music for it by that point. Natalie Holt's scores for Loki (2021–2023) is referenced for Kang's role in the season.

The episode "A Force to Be Reckoned With" features the song Volcano Girls by alternative rock band Veruca Salt. The song was originally released in 1997.

A soundtrack album featuring the Newton Brothers' music for the season was released on August 12, 2026. All music composed by the Newton Brothers:

X-Men '97: Season Two (Original Soundtrack)
No.	Title	Length
1.	"En Sabah Nur"	3:08
2.	"Survival of the Fittest"	1:37
3.	"Your Father's Daughter"	4:09
4.	"Oh My Stars and Garters"	0:30
5.	"Celestial Dunes"	1:48
6.	"You're the One Who Will"	1:45
7.	"The Horsemen of Apocalypse"	1:13
8.	"The Whims of Time"	2:06
9.	"Moments in the Drift"	1:33
10.	"The Weight of Your Destiny"	2:15
11.	"A Lost Temple of Great Cosmic Power"	1:07
12.	"Pain Calms Me"	1:09
13.	"Journey to the Cursed Temple"	1:12
14.	"Vessel"	1:26
15.	"Fated Ruin"	2:11
16.	"Pushing Sinners to Embrace the Saint"	3:18
17.	"I Am the Danger"	3:28
18.	"Polaris"	1:57
19.	"Every Reunion Is a Type of Heaven"	2:37
20.	"Trial by Fire"	1:33
21.	"Collective Dystopia"	2:21
22.	"What We Must Do"	0:54
23.	"Let Us Begin"	2:32
24.	"Fail to See"	0:48
25.	"Should Have Been Me"	1:19
26.	"Where Are We Anyway"	5:33
27.	"Wolverine"	1:31
28.	"At Least We Stuck the Landing"	1:24
29.	"Acolytes"	2:36
30.	"Turn the Power On"	1:20
31.	"Emma Frost"	1:49
32.	"Long Gone"	0:59
33.	"X-Factor x X-Force"	2:13
34.	"The Burden of Destiny"	2:16
35.	"Deeper Than Skin"	1:26
36.	"Who Pulled the Fire Alarm"	1:47
37.	"Skybound Heist"	1:16
38.	"Mon Cheri"	1:26
39.	"Second Chance"	2:42
40.	"Summon Forth"	1:53
41.	"Saved by Love"	1:09
42.	"Pay the Price"	1:23
43.	"The Thread Inside"	2:15
44.	"Your Life for His"	2:15
45.	"How Much Longer"	1:35
46.	"How We Survive"	1:57
47.	"Always to the Rescue"	0:40
Total length:		1:29:00

== Marketing ==
The season was promoted during Marvel Studios Animation's panel at Disney's D23 convention in August 2024. Footage from the season was included in a sizzle reel that was shown at Disney's upfront presentation in May 2025, and more footage was shown at a New York Comic Con panel for Marvel Television and Marvel Animation in October. Winderbaum and the Lewalds promoted the season at that panel. The first trailer was released in May 2026 along with a poster which is based on the cover of Wolverine vol. 1 #1 (1982) by Frank Miller. An episode of the series Marvel Studios: Legends was released on June 24, 2026, on YouTube, centered on Apocalypse using footage from his previous appearance in the original animated series and season one of X-Men '97.

== Release ==
The season premiered on the streaming service Disney+ on July 1, 2026, with its first three episodes. The other six episodes were released weekly until August 12. A world premiere event for the season was held at the Tribeca Festival on June 13, 2026.

== Reception ==
=== Viewership ===
Market research company Parrot Analytics, which looks at consumer engagement in consumer research, streaming, downloads, and on social media, reported that X-Men '97 was 33.5 times more in demand than the average series in Canada during the week of June 29 to July 5, 2026, ranking fourth among digital originals and tenth overall. The series subsequently ranked fourth among digital originals in Canada for the week of July 6–12, with demand 31 times that of the average series; seventh for July 13–19, at 25.3 times; fourth for July 20–26, at 27.7 times; seventh for July 27–August 2, at 26.7 times; fourth for August 3–9, at 27.4 times; and fifth for August 10–16, at 28.6 times.

Streaming analytics firm FlixPatrol, which monitors daily updated VOD charts and streaming ratings across the globe, announced that X-Men '97 was the most-streamed series on Disney+ on August 7, 2026. During the same week, the series also ranked No. 1 on Disney+ in several countries, including Bolivia, Brazil, Colombia, Costa Rica, the Dominican Republic, Ecuador, Guatemala, Honduras, Nicaragua, Panama, Peru, El Salvador, and Venezuela. On August 14, X-Men '97 placed third among the most-watched television series worldwide on Disney+, according to FlixPatrol. The series also ranked third in the United States and first in Brazil, Ecuador, Mexico, Venezuela, and several other countries.

=== Critical response ===
On review aggregator Rotten Tomatoes, 100% of 34 critics gave a positive review and the average of rated reviews was 8.60/10. The critics consensus reads, "This marvelous troupe of heroes returns for a supremely dazzling second season, providing all the entertainment, emotion, and nostalgia that top-tier animation and storytelling can deliver in X-Men '97." Metacritic, which uses a weighted average, assigned a score of 90 out of 100 based on 6 reviews, indicating "universal acclaim".
