= X-Men '92 =

Limited comic book series

- Cover to X-Men '92 (2015) #1. Art by Pepe Larraz.
- Publisher: Marvel Comics

X-Men '92

Series publication information
- Schedule: Monthly
- Format: Ongoing
- Genre: Superhero
- Publication date: (vol. 1); August – November 2015 (vol. 2); May 2016 – February 2017 (House of XCII); June – November 2022
- Number of issues: (vol. 1): 4 (#1–4) (vol. 2): 10 (#1–10) (House of XCII): 5 (#1–5)
- Main character(s): Professor X Cyclops; Jean Grey; Wolverine; Rogue; Storm; Beast; Gambit; Jubilee; Psylocke

Creative team
- Writer(s): Chris Sims & Chad Bowers
- Artist(s): Scott Koblish

Collected editions
- Vol. 0: Warzones!: ISBN 978-0785198307
- Vol. 1: The World is a Vampire: ISBN 978-1302900496
- Vol. 2: Lilapalooza: ISBN 978-1302900502

X-Men '92 is a comic book published by Marvel Comics. Introduced as one of the many tie-in titles for Marvel's 2015 Secret Wars event, it was originally a limited series and was later published in ongoing format in early 2016. X-Men '92 is inspired by X-Men: The Animated Series, but not set in the same continuity.

== Publication history ==
As part of the 2015 Secret Wars event comic, Marvel revived older series and explore alternate comic universes; one of the continuities explored was the 1992 X-Men animated series. Chris Sims and Chad Bowers wrote a four-issue limited series drawn by Scott Koblish. The premier issue sold 97,617 copies and was the 8th highest selling issue that month. The first volume was also released under Marvel's Infinite Comics series in an eight-issue story arc. After Secret Wars ended, the series returned in a second volume that lasted 10 issues. The series was praised for its '90s-style art and color and many '90s cultural references, including a crossover with The Toadies. When asked later on Twitter, Chris Sims revealed that this series does not take place in the same continuity as X-Men: The Animated Series; its setting was later designated as Earth-15730 in the Marvel Comics multiverse.

On January 14, 2022, it was announced by Marvel that a five-part series would be launching on April 6, 2022 (cover dated June 2022), titled X-Men '92: House of XCII. House of XCII combines elements of X-Men: The Animated Series with those of the mainline continuity's Krakoan Age. For instance, Jubilee takes the place of Moira MacTaggert as a mutant whose powers allow her to reincarnate through timelines. The third issue adapts the storyline "X of Swords", with Arkon's homeworld of Polemachus taking the place of Otherworld.

== Fictional team biography ==
=== Volume 1 ===
The team is seen living a fairly peaceful life in the Battlezone called Westchester. The baron of this region is Senator Robert Kelly. He has little difficulty since most of the villains were wiped out in a previous war and the remaining villains were sent to "Bureau of Super-Powers" run by Cassandra Nova for rehabilitation. After a rogue Sentinel attack the X-Men are invited to the facility to learn about process. The X-Men are then put into the virtual training pods, but were really sent into the astral plane, since Nova was possessed by the Shadow King. The team is saved by Jubilee, who Nova did not consider a big enough threat and did not put into the VR pod and by the X-Force, who assault the facility. Xavier is able to repel the Shadow King and the X-Men save Kelly, but a mega-Sentinel is released against the X-Mansion. The X-Men and X-Force combine to defeat the machine before it causes too much damage.

=== Volume 2 ===
==== The World is a Vampire ====
The Upstarts, a group of evil mutants, are playing a game to find who can hurt the X-Men the most. The Von Strucker twins make their play by tricking The People's Protectorate to attack the X-Men, who come to the mansion hunting Maverick. Unbeknownst to them, Maverick was hired by the twins, and released a computer virus named Darkhold into Cerebro. The Von Strucker twins then release Alpha Red, the vampire son of Dracula, who had been experimented on by the Soviets to become a super-soldier and trapped fifty years prior. The escaped vampire converts Jubilee, Maverick, and most of the other students, People's Protectorate, and X-Men into vampires. The computer virus in Cerebro converts vampire DNA to remove their weakness against sunlight. Dead Girl, immune to the vampires, uses Cerebro to remove the virus and deletes the vampiric DNA.

During these events, Cyclops and Jean Grey are on vacation in Anchorage, Alaska, but are teleported to the future by Rachel Summers. This dystopian future is ruled by Mister Sinister while Apocalypse is conquering the galaxy. Rachel tells them she needs their help to defeat Sinister, but it turns out she was helping Sinister harvest their genes to create Nathan Summers in order to defeat Apocalypse. In the end, Rachel is racked with guilt and kills Sinister, but drains the last of her Phoenix Force, so Cyclops and Jean are teleported back and Nathan stays with Blaquesmith.

==== Lilapalooza ====
Lila Cheney is performing a concert with The Toadies and The Flaming Lips to create peace between humans and mutants, with the X-Men as security. Death's Head comes to collect a bounty on Lila, and at the same time Fabian Cortez appears and overcharges Lila's teleporting powers, causing her to take the X-Men to a distant planet inhabited by the Brood. After a fight with the Brood, the X-Men realize they are mutant outcasts from the rest of the Brood hive and protect them from Gladiator and the Shi'ar. During the battle the X-Men steal the Shi'ar ship and return to Earth. Meanwhile, Apocalypse and a group of mutant villains appear at the concert and suggest a truce. Cable and the X-Force appear and fight, but Professor X realizes that Apocalypse's intentions are semi-altruistic. He plans to convert all humans into mutants and take over the world, so he can defeat the Celestial Exodus. Cyclops and Jean Grey return from the future with the Darkhold. Professor X decides to use it to convert every human into a mutant only if humankind agrees.

In the denouement, humankind overwhelmingly agrees to help and Professor X uses the Darkhold to convert everyone into a mutant. Now with every person on Earth super-powered, they all press the attacks against Exodus.

== See also ==
- X-Men '97
- Batman '66
- Wonder Woman '77
- Superman '78
- Batman '89
