= The Stabilizer =

1984 Indonesian action film

- DVD cover
- Directed by: Arizal
- Written by: Deddy Armand; John Rust
- Produced by: Dhamoo Punjabi; Gobind Punjabi; Raam Punjabi
- Starring: Peter O'Brian; Craig Gavin; Gillie Beanz; Dana Christina; Harry Capri
- Edited by: Tony Chow; Benny M.S.
- Distributed by: Troma Entertainment
- Release date: 1984
- Running time: 90 minutes
- Country: Indonesia
- Language: English

The Stabilizer is a 1984 Indonesian action film directed by Arizal, produced by Parkit Film (The Punjabi Brothers) and distributed by Troma Entertainment. The movie stars New Zealand born actor Peter O'Brian who plays Peter Goldson, also known as The Stabilizer. He is an FBI agent who is sent to Thailand to retrieve a brilliant professor who has been captured by the drug lord Greg Rainmaker.

The Stabilizer was also released in the Philippines by Roadshow Films International on September 3, 1987.
