= Iona Morris =

American actress

- Born: Columbus, Ohio, U.S.
- Other names: Jonia Morris, Brittany Harlowe
- Occupation: Actress
- Years active: 1966–present
- Parent: Greg Morris (father)
- Relatives: Phil Morris (brother); Francis Williams (grandfather)

Iona Morris is an American actress. She has performed in numerous films and television shows, including extensive voice work in animation, where she is best known for voicing Storm.

== Early life ==
Iona was born in Columbus, Ohio, and is the daughter of late actor Greg Morris (1933–1996) and older sister of Phil Morris.

== Career ==
Morris was the original voice of Storm in the X-Men and Spider-Man: The Animated Series. Her voice work also includes Medusa in the 1994 Fantastic Four series, Claudia Grant in Robotech, Nia/Betty in Phantom 2040, Luba on W.I.T.C.H. and Principal Stringent on Chalkzone.

When she was a child, she appeared (with her brother and future recurring Trek guest actor, Phil) in an episode of the original Star Trek entitled "Miri". Later, Iona appeared in the two part episode of Star Trek: Voyager, "Workforce" and was one of few to star in one of the episodes of the second Twilight Zone series. She has also made numerous guest appearances on many television shows, including The Wayans Bros. In 2006, she was the voice of Jean Grant in Robotech: The Shadow Chronicles.

She also appeared as Colonel Louise James in the cinematic version of Command and Conquer 4.

== Filmography ==
=== Film ===
| Year | Title | Role | Notes |
|---|---|---|---|
| 1986 | Robotech: The Movie | Becky Michaels (voice) | English dub |
| 1986 | The Stabilizer | Christina Provost (voice) | English dub |
| 1987 | Windaria | Celina (voice) | English dub |
| 1987 | Lily C.A.T. | Carolyn (voice) | English dub |
| 1991 | Silent Möbius | Katsumi Liqueur (voice) | Streamline Pictures dub |
| 1992 | Rain Without Thunder | Andrea Murdoch | |
| 1995 | Once Upon a Time... When We Were Colored | Nila Fontaine | |
| 1995 | Barefoot Gen | Kimie (voice) | English dub |
| 1995 | It's in the Bag | Cynda | |
| 1996 | A Hill of Our Own | Mrs. Nash | Short film |
| 1997 | Psycho Diver: Soul Siren | Angelica (voice) | English dub |
| 1997 | Spider-Man: Secret Wars | Storm, Ororo Munroe (voices) | Direct-to-video |
| 1998 | Next Time | Wanda | |
| 1998 | High Freakquency | Nubian Princess | |
| 2002 | Banged Out | —N/a | Direct-to-video |
| 2003 | Ride or Die | —N/a | |
| 2005 | Tarzan 2 | Additional voices | Direct-to-video |
| 2005 | The Eavesdropper | Gen. Humes' Aide | |
| 2006 | Robotech: The Shadow Chronicles | Jean Grant (voice) | English dub |
| 2010 | Thoughts of Suicide on an Otherwise Lovely Day | Angela | Short film |
| 2012 | Murder on the 13th Floor | Eastorian (voice) | |

=== Television ===
| Year | Title | Role | Notes |
|---|---|---|---|
| 1966 | Star Trek: The Original Series | Little African American Girl | Episode: "Miri" |
| 1970 | Christmas Is | Unknown role (voice) | TV series short |
| 1982 | WKRP in Cincinnati | Hospital Worker | Episode: "Dear Liar" |
| 1984 | The New Scooby-Doo Mysteries | Additional voices | Episode: "Happy Birthday, Scooby-Doo" |
| 1984 | Morgengrauen | Rena | Television film |
| 1985 | Megazone 23 | Eve Tokimatsuri (voice) | English dub |
| 1985 | Robotech | Claudia Grant, Grant (voices) | 5 episodes |
| 1985 | Codename: Robotech | Claudia Grant (voice) | English dub |
| 1985 | The Twilight Zone | Annie | Episode: "Chameleon" |
| 1985 | Hollywood Beat | Monique | Episode: "No Place to Hide" |
| 1985 | Captain Harlock and the Queen of a Thousand Years | Olivia | 65 episodes |
| 1986 | Night Court | Mrs. Johnson | Episode: "Leon, We Hardly Knew Ye" |
| 1986 | Our House | —N/a | 2 episodes |
| 1986 | ABC Weekend Specials | Unknown role (voice) | Episode: "Liberty and the Littles" |
| 1986 | Knots Landing | Reporter | Episode: "All Over But the Shouting" |
| 1987 | Hill Street Blues | Jacqueline | Episode: "Der Roachenkavalier" |
| 1987 | Charles in Charge | Nancy Mayo | Episode: "U. F. Oh No!" |
| 1987 | The Real Ghostbusters | Miss Nuxum, Dahlia (voices) | Episode: "Moaning Stones" |
| 1988 | The Cosby Show | Veterinarian | Episode: "Is There a Hamster in the House?" |
| 1990 | The Baby-Sitters Club | Mrs. Stewart | Episode: "Stacey's Big Break" |
| 1990 | As the World Turns | Fiona | 1 episode |
| 1992 | True Colors | Mrs. Walker | Episode: "In a Flash" |
| 1992 | Bobby's World | Unknown role (voice) | Episode: "The Music" |
| 1992–1994 | X-Men: The Animated Series | Storm/Ororo Munroe (voice) | 16 episodes |
| 1993 | Where I Live | Ms. Hall | Episode: "Big Mon on Campus" |
| 1993–1994 | Problem Child | —N/a | 26 episodes |
| 1994 | Hot Line | Coley | Episode: "Visions of Love" |
| 1994–1995 | Fantastic Four | Medusa (voice) | 4 episodes |
| 1994–1995 | Phantom 2040 | Betty, Nia, Commander Iyapo (voices) | 9 episodes |
| 1995 | Murder, She Wrote | Lt. Estelle Karr | Episode: "Game, Set, Murder" |
| 1995 | Martin | Allison Jones | Episode: "Swing Thing" |
| 1995 | What-a-Mess | Additional voices | 3 episodes |
| 1996 | Captain Planet and the Planeteers | Woman (voice) | Episode: "Never the Twain Shall Meet" |
| 1996 | The Tick | Holly (voice) | Episode: "That Mustache Feeling" |
| 1996 | The Real Adventures of Jonny Quest | Teacher (voice) | Episode: "Heroes" |
| 1996 | Homeboys in Outer Space | Kate | Episode: "A Man's Place Is in the Homey, or the Stepford Guys" |
| 1996 | The Legend of Sarmoti: Siegfried & Roy | Unknown role (voice) | Television series short |
| 1996–1997 | Spider-Man: The Animated Series | Storm, Martha Robertson (voices) | 3 episodes |
| 1997 | The Wayans Bros. | Carmella | Episode: "Pops' Secret" |
| 1997 | Extreme Ghostbusters | Additional voices | Episode: Dog Days |
| 1998 | In the House | Gloria Allblack | Episode: "Say Anything" |
| 1998 | The Wild Thornberrys | Mother Elephant (voice) | Episode: "Iron Curtain" |
| 1999 | Rocket Power | MacKenzie's Mother (voice) | Episode: "Hawaii Blues/Lost and Find" |
| 1999 | The Adventures of A.R.K. | Dr. Hosking | Unknown episodes |
| 1999–2001 | Moesha | Sandy | 3 episodes |
| 2001 | The Princess & the Marine | INS Woman #1 | Television film |
| 2001 | Star Trek: Voyager | Umali | 2 episodes |
| 2001 | Spyder Games | Naomi Peters | 1 episode |
| 2001 | Citizen Baines | —N/a | Episode: "Three Days in November" |
| 2001–2002 | Da Mob | Wanda (voice) | 7 episodes |
| 2002 | The Shield | Ida | Episode: "Our Gang" |
| 2002–2003 | The District | Clive's Sister | 2 episodes |
| 2003–2004 | ChalkZone | Principal Stringent (voice) | 4 episodes |
| 2004 | LAX | Selma Dominic | Episode: "Finnegan Again, Begin Again" |
| 2006 | W.I.T.C.H. | Luba | 4 episodes |
| 2008 | House of Payne | Bernice | Episode: "Game Over" |
| 2009 | Lincoln Heights | Rhonda | Episode: "Bully for You" |
| 2009 | Cold Case | Alice Watson '09 | Episode: "Read Between the Lines" |
| 2011 | Law & Order: LA | Judge Linda Day | Episode: Van Nuys" |
| 2011 | Love That Girl! | Mrs. Carter | Episode: "Me Nobody Knows" |
| 2012 | The Soul Man | Rosetta | Episode: "Lost in the Move" |
| 2017 | Take It from the Top | Glory | Television film |

=== Video games ===
| Year | Title | Role | Notes |
|---|---|---|---|
| 1993 | Leisure Suit Larry 6: Shape Up or Slip Out! | Shablee, Thunderbird | |
| 1996 | X-Men Cartoon Maker | Storm/Ororo Munroe | |
| 1999 | T'ai Fu: Wrath of the Tiger | Fei Liu | |
| 2002 | Forgotten Realms: Icewind Dale II | Additional voices | |
| 2002 | Emperor: Battle for Dune | UI Computer | |
| 2004 | EverQuest II | Generic Centaur Enemy, Generic Dryad Enemy, Generic Ogre Ghost Enemy | |
| 2005 | Law & Order: Criminal Intent | Kathy Dillard, Gayle Pearson, Helen Reynolds | |
| 2007 | Spider-Man 3 | Dr. Andrews, Additional voices | |
| 2010 | Command & Conquer 4: Tiberian Twilight | Colonel James | |
| 2013 | Sly Cooper: Thieves in Time | Cat Guard, Hack Computer Voice | |
| 2013 | Grand Theft Auto V | The Local Population | |
| 2015 | Fallout 4 | Daisy, Cheryl Glass, Clair Hutchins, Gibson | |
| 2024 | Dustborn | Annie | |
