= Children of the Atom (disambiguation) =

Children of the Atom is a 1953 novel by Wilmar Shiras

Children of the Atom may also refer to:

== Marvel X-Men ==
- X-Men: Children of the Atom (video game), a 1994 fighting game
- X-Men: Children of the Atom (comics), a 1999 comic book series
- Children of the Atom (comics), a 2021 comic book series
- Children of the Atom (supplement), a mutant-related sourcebook for the Marvel Super Heroes role-playing game from TSR
- Children of the Atom, a Marvel Comics nickname for human mutants in Marvel Comics

== Other uses ==
- "Children of the Atom", 2012 song by Flying Lotus off Duality (mixtape)
- Children of the atom, a type of mutants in fiction from nuclear radiation
