= Alison Sealy-Smith =

Barbadian-born Canadian actress

- Sealy-Smith at Dragon Con in 2026
- Born: 1959 (age 66–67); Bridgetown, Barbados
- Education: Mount Allison University
- Occupation: Actress
- Years active: 1965, 1987–present
- Children: 2, including Makyla

Alison Sealy-Smith (born 1959) is a Barbadian-born Canadian actress best known for her role as the mutant goddess Storm in X-Men: The Animated Series (1993–1997), X-Men '97 (2024–present), and What If...? (2024).

== Early life and education ==
Smith was born in Bridgetown, Barbados and raised in Toronto. She attended Mount Allison University in New Brunswick, Canada, where she studied psychology on a scholarship.

== Career ==
She is the founding director of Obsidian Theatre, a company that specializes in African-Canadian drama. Smith was awarded a Dora Mavor Moore Award for her 1997 star turn in Djanet Sears' Harlem Duet.

Her film and television credits include the series Street Legal, This is Wonderland and The Line, and a recurring role in Kevin Hill. She also had a small role in the 1998 film My Date with the President's Daughter.

Smith also voiced characters in various animated series such as Storm on the 1990s X-Men and Scarlett on the Teletoon series Delilah and Julius. She played Sergeant Rose in the film Confessions of a Teenage Drama Queen, Honey (with Jessica Alba), Dark Water, and Talk to Me. Since the mid-2000s, she had a recurring role as Ms. Mann in the children's series Naturally, Sadie. In 2009, she performed as Nurse Lydia in the HBO Canada series Bloodletting & Miraculous Cures.

Smith won a Dora Mavor Moore Award in 1997 for Best Female Performance for her role in Harlem Duet. She also won a Dora Mavor Moore Award in 2009 for Outstanding Performance By A Female In A Principal Role with her role as Lena in A Raisin In The Sun.

== Personal life ==
Her daughter, Makyla Smith, is also an actress.

== Filmography ==
=== Film ===
Year	Title	Role	Notes
1994	Death Wish V: The Face of Death	Doctor	
1995	Rude	Rude Caller	
1998	Down in the Delta	Diner 2	
2000	Loser	University Official	
2001	The Little Bear Movie	Cub's Mother (voice)	
2003	Honey	Marisol	
2004	Confessions of a Teenage Drama Queen	Sergeant Rose	
2004	The Skulls III	Dr. Franks	Direct-to-video
2005	Dark Water	Supervisor	
2006	Take the Lead	Rock's Mom	
2007	How She Move	Mrs. Davis	
2007	Talk to Me	Freda	
2007	Hit for Six	Ianthe Nelson	
2007	You Kill Me	Doris Rainford	
2015	Vigilante: The Crossing	Myrtle	

=== Television ===
Year	Title	Role	Notes
1987–1994	Street Legal	Mercedes / Reporter #2	56 episodes
1991	E.N.G.	Rose	Episode: "Illuminations"
1993–1997	X-Men: The Animated Series	Ororo Munroe / Storm (voice)	
1995	Friends at Last	Woman #1	Television film
1995	Kung Fu: The Legend Continues	Theil	Episode: "Citizen Caine"
1995	Spider-Man: The Animated Series	Storm / Ororo Munroe (voice)	2 episodes
1995	Sailor Moon	Amphibia / Gemini Warrior (voice, English-language version)	2 episodes
1996	Due South	Mrs. Cameron	Episode: "White Men Can't Jump to Conclusions"
1996	Talk to Me	Miriam	Television film
1997	Diabolik	Ranavalona (voice)	Episode: "Panther Uncaged"
1997	The Newsroom	Globe Reporter #1	Episode: "Unity"
1997	Ms. Scrooge	Lettie	Television film
1998	The Wonderful World of Disney	Protester Woman	Episode: "My Date with the President's Daughter"
1998	Silver Surfer	Gamora (voice)	3 episodes
1998	Labor of Love	Kara	Television film
1998	Freaky Stories	Narrator	Episode: "Mouse Trap"
1998	Birdz	Abby Storkowitz (voice)	2 episodes
1999	Dear America: A Picture of Freedom	Aunt Tee	Television film
1999	Love Songs	Caribbean Woman	Television film
1999	Tales from the Cryptkeeper	Mom (voice)	Episode: "So Very Attractive"
2000	A House Divided	Ruth	Television film
2000	The Ride	Janet	Television film
2000	Dear America: Color Me Dark	Olive Love	Television film
2001	The Associates	Denise Naismith	Episode: "E Pluribus Unum"
2002	Terrorised by Teens: The Jonathan Wamback Story	Maureen	Television film
2002–2003	Blue Murder	Moira Kemmer / Marquerite Kzaner	2 episodes
2003	Sue Thomas: F.B.Eye	Doctor	Episode: "The Leak"
2003	Miss Spider's Sunny Patch Kids	Mama Snake (voice)	Television film
2003	King	Tess (voice)	Episode: "Down to Under"
2003	Monster by Mistake	Cleon (voice)	Episode: "Monster Wrestling Challenge"
2004	Chasing Freedom	INS officer-in-charge	Television film
2004	Degrassi: The Next Generation	Dean's Lawyer	Episode: "Ghost in the Machine: Part 1"
2004	The Wool Cap	Cheryl	Television film
2004	Kink in My Hair	Ms Patsy	Television film
2004	Kevin Hill	Judge Rebecca Brooks	2 episodes
2004–2006	This Is Wonderland	Judge Vaughn	17 episodes
2004–2006	Miss Spider's Sunny Patch Friends	Snake (voice)	5 episodes
2005	Haunting Sarah	Rosie	Television film
2005	Time Warp Trio	Jinga (voice)	Episode: "Jinga All The Way"
2005–2007	Naturally, Sadie	Ms. Mann	14 episodes
2005–2008	Delilah & Julius	Scarlett (voice)	31 episodes
2007	The Jane Show	Candice	Episode: "The Chosen One"
2007–2008	Da Kink in My Hair	Leanne	2 episodes
2008	MVP	Cadde Lawrence	Episode: "Mad Scramble"
2008	Friends and Heroes	Devorah (voice)	13 episodes
2008–2010	The Latest Buzz	Mrs. Davies	2 episodes
2009	The Line	Cecil	6 episodes
2010	Bloodletting & Miraculous Cures	Nurse Lydia	7 episodes
2021	21 Black Futures	Ancestor	Episode: "Cavities"
2024–present	X-Men '97	Ororo Munroe / Storm / the Adversary (voice)	13 episodes
2024	What If...?	Ororo Munroe / Storm (voice)	2 episodes

=== Video games ===
Year	Title	Role	Notes
2025	Marvel Cosmic Invasion	Storm, Shuri	
