= List of X-Men: The Animated Series and X-Men '97 adaptations =

This is a list of comic book storylines adapted in the animated series X-Men: The Animated Series (1992–1997) and its revival X-Men '97 (2024–present). For adaptations of the animated series to comic book storylines, see X-Men '92 (2015–2022).

== Adaptations ==
=== X-Men: The Animated Series ===
==== Season 1 ====
- The two-part Pilot episode "Night of the Sentinels" features "The Mutant Registration Act" which was first used in "Days of Future Past" from Uncanny X-Men #141 (January 1981) by writer Chris Claremont and writer/artist John Byrne. The battle at the shopping mall is adapted from Jubilee's first appearance in the story "Ladies' Night" from Uncanny X-Men #244 (May 1989) by writer Claremont and artist Marc Silvestri. In that story, Jubilee is attacked by the M-Squad and is rescued by female X-Men, and the final sequence wherein Jubilee arrives at the X-Mansion is based on a similar sequence when Kitty Pryde first arrived at the X-Mansion following the funeral for Phoenix in "Elegy" from Uncanny X-Men #138 (October 1980) by writer Claremont and writer/artist Byrne. Elements from Claremont's The New Mutants #2 "Sentinels", where the students are attacked by Sentinels at the mall, are also used.
- The episode, "Enter Magneto", features a confrontation at a missile base: this is largely based on the X-Men's first battle with Magneto, as told in their debut story "X-Men" from X-Men #1 (September 1963) by writer Stan Lee and artist Jack Kirby.
- "Captive Hearts" is loosely based on events depicted in "Catacombs" and "Dancin' in the Dark" from Uncanny X-Men #169-170 (May–June 1983) by writer Claremont and artist Paul Smith, except that the X-Man kidnapped by the Morlocks in those stories was Angel, rather than Cyclops.
- In the episode "Slave Island", Genosha's treatment of mutants as slave labor is adapted from "Welcome to Genosha"/"Busting Loose"/"Who's Human?"/"Gonna be a Revolution" from Uncanny X-Men #235-238 (October–November 1988) by writer Claremont and artists Rick Leonardi and Silvestri. However, the premise of how Genosha's enslaved mutants are greatly retooled is likely to be more appropriate for children's television.
- In the episode "The Unstoppable Juggernaut", the Juggernaut's origins are adapted from the story "The Origin of Professor X!" from X-Men #12 (July 1965) by writer Stan Lee and artists Jack Kirby and Alex Toth. Also, the X-Men clashing with Juggernaut at the bank is adapted loosely from the story "Juggernaut's Back in Town" from Uncanny X-Men #194 (March, 1985) by writer Claremont and artist John Romita Jr., particularly the portions where the X-Men are staking out the bank before the Juggernaut attacks and the origin of Colossus is adapted from "Deadly Genesis!" in Giant-Size X-Men #1 (May, 1975) by writer Len Wein and artist Dave Cockrum.
- "The Cure" features a flashback to Rogue's origins detailing her kiss with Cody Robbins, which is adapted from "Public Enemy" from Uncanny X-Men #185 (September 1984) by writer Claremont and artist Romita Jr.
- Apocalypse's creation of his Four Horsemen in "Come the Apocalypse" is very loosely adapted from issues #10 "Falling Angel!", #12 "Boom Boom Boom!", #15 "Whose Death is it, Anyway?", #19 "All Together Now!" and #24 "Masks" from X-Factor by writer Louise Simonson artists Walter Simonson and Marc Silvestri.
- The first part of the two-part episode story "Days of Future Past" is loosely based on Uncanny X-Men #141 (January 1981) by writer Claremont and writer/artist Byrne, the first part of the "Days of Future Past" story arc. The entire story was retooled to fit the continuity established in the animated series; however, some original elements remained such as Wolverine leading a resistance against the Sentinels. However, Bishop's role as a tracker of mutant rebels is reminiscent of Rachel Summers' role as a Hound, likely adapted from Uncanny X-Men #189 (January 1985). Similarly, Bishop's betrayal of the Sentinels and travel back in time is adapted from Kate Pryde's similar stunt in Uncanny X-Men #141. Nimrod's appearance and battle with the X-Men are likely adapted from "Raiders of the Lost Temple!" in Uncanny X-Men #191 (March 1985) and Uncanny X-Men #194. Also, Bishop's assertion that Gambit betrayed the X-Men is adapted from "Bishop to King's Five!" from Uncanny X-Men #287 (April 1992) by writers Lee, Scott Lobdell and artist Romita Jr., wherein Bishop's future the X-Men were killed by one of their own, and as Gambit was the only survivor Bishop long suspected him of betraying the X-Men.
- The second part of "Days of Future Past" is adapted from "Mind Out of Time" from Uncanny X-Men #142 (February 1981) by Claremont and writer/artist Byrne, wherein the X-Men prevent the Brotherhood of Mutants from assassinating Senator Robert Kelly. The story was altered to fit the continuity of the animated series, wherein Bishop takes the place of Kate Pryde; however, it deviates from the original story when Magneto abducts Kelly.
- The entire Sentinel plot from the episode "The Final Decision", including Master Mold forcing Trask to do his bidding is adapted from "Among Us Stalk... the Sentinels"/"Prisoners of the Mysterious Master Mold!"/"The Supreme Sacrifice!" from X-Men #14–16 (November 1965 – January 1966) by writer Stan Lee and artists Jack Kirby and Jay Gavin. Meanwhile, Scott's marriage proposal to Jean Grey and Mister Sinister's interest, which is explored fully in Season 2, is very loosely adapted in "Inferno, Part the Fourth: Ashes!" from Uncanny X-Men #243 (April 1989) by writer Claremont and artist Marc Silvestri, among other issues where Sinister manipulates Scott's marriage to Madelyne Pryor for his twisted ends.

==== Season 2 ====
- The episode "Whatever It Takes" features a flashback depicting MjNari's birth is based on the story "Lifedeath II: From the Heart of Darkness" from Uncanny X-Men #198 (October 1985) by writer Claremont and artist Barry Windsor-Smith. In that story, Storm discovered Shani's tribe after losing her mutant powers and resuscitated Shani's (unnamed) son as in this episode. The story also featured a tribal elder named MjNari, who chose to die when Shani's son was born, so that the tribe would not become too numerous for its resources.
- The episode "Repo Man" is based on "Shoot-Out at the Stampede!" from Uncanny X-Men #121 (May 1979) by writer Claremont, writer/artist Byrne and artist Terry Austin. The episode is also based on the "Weapon X" story from Marvel Comics Presents #72-84 (March–September 1991) by writer/artist Barry Windsor-Smith.
- The episode "X-Ternally Yours" is based upon the Gambit 4 issue mini-series featuring "Tithing"/"Honor Amongst Thieves"/"The Benefactress"/"Thief of Time" (which was published around the same time that episode first aired) (December 1993–March 1994) by writer Howard Mackie, artists Lee Weeks and Klaus Janson. Though in the comics Gambit's brother is named Henri instead of Bobby.
- "Time Fugitives (parts 1 & 2)" features a variation of the "Legacy Virus" storyline where it was the creation of Apocalypse, who had created the virus with the aid of Graydon Creed and the Friends of Humanity, infecting innocent people and claiming that mutants were the ones who had caused the plague. In an attempt to stop the plague, Bishop came back from the future to destroy Apocalypse's work before the virus could move on to mutants, but as a result, vital antibodies that would allow the mutant race to survive future plagues were never created. Traveling back from even further in the future, Cable comes up with a compromise that allowed both Bishop's and his missions to succeed; although the plague never made the jump to mutants on a large-scale basis, Cable nevertheless ensured that Wolverine would be infected, thus creating the necessary antibodies while not killing any mutants thanks to Wolverine's healing factor.
- Parts of the episode "A Rogue's Tale" are based on "Rogue Redux" in Uncanny X-Men #269 (October 1990) by writer Claremont and artists Jim Lee and Art Thibert. Whilst other parts of the episode are based on "By Friends – Betrayed!" in Avengers Annual #10 (August 1981) by writer Claremont and artists Michael Golden and Armando Gil.

==== Season 3 ====
- "The Phoenix Saga (Part 1): Sacrifice" is loosely based on "My Brother, My Enemy!" from X-Men #97 (February 1976) by writer Claremont and artists Cockrum and Sam Grainger. The story is also based on "Deathstar, Rising!"/"Greater Love Hath No X-Man..." from X-Men #99-100 (June/August 1976) and "Phoenix Unleashed!" from X-Men #105 (June 1977) all by writer Claremont and artist Cockrum.
- "The Phoenix Saga (Part 2): The Dark Shroud" is loosely based on "Like a Phoenix, from the Ashes" from X-Men #101 (October 1976) by writer Claremont and artist Dave Cockrum. As well as "Dark Shroud of the Past!" from X-Men #106 (August 1977) by writers Claremont and Bill Mantlo and artists Cockrum and William Robert Brown.
- "The Phoenix Saga (Part 3): The Cry of the Banshee" is loosely based on "Who Will Stop the Juggernaut?"/"The Fall of the Tower"/"The Gentleman's Name is Magneto" from X-Men #102-104 (December, 1976-April, 1977) by writer Claremont and artists Cockrum and Sam Grainger.
- "The Phoenix Saga (Part 4): The Starjammers" is loosely based on "Where No X-Man Has Gone Before!" from X-Men #107 (October 1977) by writer Claremont and artists Cockrum and Dan Green.
- "The Phoenix Saga (Part 5): Child of Light" is loosely based on "Armageddon Now" from X-Men #108 (December 1977) by writer Claremont and artists Byrne and Terry Austin.
- "The Dark Phoenix Saga (Part 1): Dazzled" is both based heavily and loosely on different areas, of the storylines "Dazzler"/"Run for Your Life!"/ "And Hellfire is Their Name!" from Uncanny X-Men #130-132 (February–April 1980) written by Claremont and Byrne, with art by Byrne and Terry Austin.
- "The Dark Phoenix Saga (Part 2): The Inner Circle" is based on "Wolverine: Alone!" in Uncanny X-Men #133 (May 1980) and "Too Late, the Heroes!" in Uncanny X-Men #134 (June 1980). The battle with the Inner Circle follows the original comics very closely, with Beast taking the role of Nightcrawler (when juggling Sebastian Shaw), and Rogue taking the role of Colossus (tearing the arm off Donald Pierce). The comic was created by writers Claremont and Byrne, with art by Byrne and Terry Austin.
- "The Dark Phoenix Saga (Part 3): The Dark Phoenix" is based on "Dark Phoenix" from Uncanny X-Men #135 (July 1980) and "Child of Light and Darkness!" in Uncanny X-Men #136 (August 1980) by writers Claremont and Byrne, with art by Byrne and Terry Austin.
- "The Dark Phoenix Saga (Part 4): The Fate of the Phoenix" is based on the comic of the same name ("The Fate of the Phoenix!") from Uncanny X-Men #137 (September 1980) by writers Claremont and Byrne, with art by Byrne and Terry Austin.
- The episode "Orphan's End" is based on "Reunion" in Uncanny X-Men #154 and "First Blood" in Uncanny X-Men #155 by writer Claremont and artist Cockrum.

==== Season 4 ====
- The "One Man's Worth" two-parter is an original story, greenlit, and designed for the TV series in January 1994. In a reversal of the usual book-to-TV origin, this story became the basis and inspiration for the crossover series of books "Age of Apocalypse", which was published in 1995–96. Many character designs in the Age of Apocalypse, most prominently that of the alternate Forge, were first created for the TV series. Because of the length of time it takes to animate an ambitious episode (sometimes a full year), these two creations are often placed in the wrong order. Bob Harras, supervisor of the X-books in the mid-1990s and advisor to the TV series, had access to the full "One Man's Worth" story and designs by early May 1994. The Age of Apocalypse books followed eight months later.
- "Sanctuary (Part 1)" is loosely based on "Rubicon" from X-Men (Vol. 2) #1 (October 1991) and "Firestorm" from X-Men (Vol. 2) #2 (November 1991) from the X-Men: Legacy series and the "Fatal Attractions" crossover storyline. The comic book story was written by writer Claremont and writer/artist Jim Lee with artist Scott Williams.
- "Sanctuary (Part 2)" is loosely based on "Fallout!" from X-Men (Vol. 2) #3 (December 1991) from the X-Men: Legacy series and the "Fatal Attractions" crossover storyline. The comic book story was written by Claremont and writer/artist Jim Lee with art by Scott Williams.
- The episode "Weapon X, Lies, & Videotape" is loosely based on the storylines "The Shiva Scenario Part 1: Dreams of Gore, Phase 1"/"Shiva Scenario Part 2: Dreams of Gore: Phase Two"/"The Shiva Scenario Part 3: Dreams of Gore: Phase 3" from Wolverine #48-50 (November, 1992–January, 1993), which were all written by Larry Hama with art by Marc Silvestri. There was also a bit of the story-lines "Nightmare Quest!"/"Reunion!"/"Bastions of Glory!"/"What Goes Around..." from issues #61-64 (September–December 1992) thrown in (though the robot Talos is called "Shiva" there, and the Weapon X project has more members). These issues were written by Larry Hama with art by Mark Texeira.

==== Season 5 ====
- The two-part final season opener "Phalanx Covenant" was adapted from the comic of the same name (September–October 1994) with Beast as the central character. The Phalanx were conceived to be fully alien and not mutant-hating humans who were infected with the technology, becoming more like the Technarchy, with Cameron Hodge working along with them serving much the same role as in the comics. During the two-parter, Beast teams up with Warlock, Forge (part of X-Factor), Mister Sinister, Amelia Voght (who was working on Muir Island at the time), and Magneto.
- The episode "Jubilee's Fairytale Theater" is based on "Kitty's Fairy Tale" from Uncanny X-Men #153 (January 1982) by writer Claremont and artist Cockrum. The comic featured Kitty Pryde telling a fairytale to Illyana Rasputina, whilst the series replaced Kitty Pryde with Jubilee and Illyana with a group of school children.
- The episode "Old Soldiers" is loosely based on the plot of "Madripoor Knights" from Uncanny X-Men #268 (September 1990) by writer Claremont and artists Jim Lee and Scott Williams. It tells the tale of Logan, while acting as a special operative for Canada, teaming up with Captain America and the Howling Commandos during World War II to rescue someone who had been captured by Red Skull. Logan would use detachable metal claws to scale the side of a mountain and then comment on how he liked them.

=== X-Men '97 ===
==== Season 1 ====
- The episode "To Me, My X-Men" references the "Hellfire Gala" (June 2021–July 2025) as a Daily Bugle article, reported by Eddie Brock and Peter Parker.
- "Mutant Liberation Begins", features Magneto's trial at the United Nations, after becoming the X-Men's new leader, as depicted in the plot of "The Trial of Magneto!" from Uncanny X-Men #200 (December 1985), by writer Claremont and artist John Romita Jr., while Storm losing her powers and leaving the X-Men is adapted from the "Public Enemy!" storyline from Uncanny X-Men #185.
- "Inferno" (August 1988–August 1989) is loosely condensed in the episode "Fire Made Flesh", featuring the reveal of Madelyne Pryor as a clone of Jean, her transformation into the Goblin Queen, her kidnapping an infant Nathan Summers, and Magik's transformation into Darkchilde, via Morph. Additionally, Gambit's vision of Rogue and Magneto making out is lifted from Uncanny X-Men #274 (March 1991) by writer Claremont and writer/artist Jim Lee, and Jean's flashback of the death of her childhood friend Anne Richardson, is adapted from Bizarre Adventures #27 (July 1981) by writer Claremont and artist John Buscema.
- In "Motendo / Lifedeath – Part 1", the "Lifedeath" storyline from Uncanny X-Men #186 (October 1984), by writer Claremont and artist Barry Windsor-Smith is adapted for Storm's and Forge's segment, along with elements from the Konami X-Men video game for Jubilee's and Sunspot's segment.
- In the episode "Remember It", the Mutant Massacre of Genosha by the Wild Sentinels is adapted from the "E Is for Extinction" storyline in New X-Men #115 (July 2001) by writer Grant Morrison and artist Frank Quitely, but Cassandra Nova who orchestrated the massacre in the comics was replaced by Bastion. Also, Scott cheating on Jean and having a psychic affair with Madelyne is lifted from New X-Men #138-139 (May–June 2003) by writer Grant Morrison and artists Frank Quitely and Phil Jimenez, with Madelyne taking Emma Frost's place.
- "Lifedeath – Part 2" continues adapting the "Lifedeath" storyline from Uncanny X-Men #186. After defeating the Adversary and regaining her powers, Storm dons her comics debut uniform from Giant-Size X-Men #1.
- In "Bright Eyes" Emma Frost unlocking her diamond transformation, following the Wild Sentinel attack is loosely based from New X-Men #116 (September 2001) by writer Grant Morrison and artist Frank Quitely.
- The three-part episode finale "Tolerance is Extinction" is adapted from the "Operation: Zero Tolerance" storyline (June–November 1997), with the first part featuring Bastion's origin story, his plan to destroy mutantkind by turning humans into Prime Sentinels, Valerie Cooper's reveal as Bastion's acomplatance, Bastion's raid and destruction of the X-Mansion, and Jubilee being captured by Prime Sentinels. Jubilee also dons a new suit which is lifted from Wolverine and Jubilee #1 (March 2011) by writer Kathryn Immonen and artist Phil Noto.
- The second part of "Tolerance is Extinction" is loosely based on X-Men (Vol. 2) #25 (October 1993) by writer Fabian Nicieza and artist Andy Kubert, from the "Fatal Attractions" storyline. In the episode Rogue is a stand-in for Colossus and Nightcrawler for Kitty Pryde. At the same time, all the X-Men change outflits lifted from their 1980s appearances, with the exception of Beast, Forge, and Nightcrawler. Cyclops dons his cowl uniform, Wolverine wears his brown and yellow uniform designed by artist/writer Byrne, Jean wears her Marvel Girl uniform, Rogue wears a suit similar with her debut uniform from Avengers Annual #10, while Morph wears a uniform based on the one they wore in Exiles #33 (November 2003) by writer Judd Winick and artist Tom Mandrake and Cable donns a suit based on his appearance in Marvel vs. Capcom 2: New Age of Heroes.

==== Season 2 (X-Men '97) ====
- The episode "Days of Past Future" adapts elements of The Adventures of Cyclops and Phoenix (May–August 1994) by writer Scott Lobdell and artist Gene Ha, while Wolverine's appearance is lifted from Wolverine #100 (April 1996) by writer Larry Hama and artist Dan Green.
- In the episode "A Force to be Reckoned With", Cable's recruitment and foundation of X-Force is based on "To Hunt the Hunter"/"Prey for the Living" from New Mutants #90-91 (June–July 1990) by writers Louise Simonson and Fabian Nicieza and artist Rob Liefeld, with Jubilee in the role of Cannonball. The X-Factor's role in the episode is based on the original run of X-Factor from issues #1-40 (February 1986–May 1989).
- The Rise of Apocalypse (October 1996–January 1997), by writer Terry Kavanagh, and artist Adam Pollina, is adapted in the eponymous two-parter episode. Additionally, the mid-credits scene riffs onto the iconic "Madripoor Knights" storyline in Uncanny X-Men #268.
- In "Weapon X, Lies, and DVDs", Wolverine infected by Brood DNA is based on the "Glory Day" storyline from Uncanny X-Men #234 (September 1988) by writer Claremont and artist Marc Silvestri. After Wolverine regains his Adamantium claws, he poses recreating the cover of Wolverine #1 (September 1982) by writer Claremont and artist Frank Miller.

Episode	Storyline adapted	Storyline found in	Notes
"Danger.exe"	"Dangerous"	Astonishing X-Men #7-12 (January–August 2005)	The episode primarily adapts the "Dangerous" story arc from Astonishing X-Men by writer Joss Whedon and artist John Cassaday. "Dangerous" featured Kitty Pryde returning to the X-Men to help train the younger generation of students; "Danger.exe" has Polaris being let go from X-Factor and returning to the X-Men, assuming Kitty's role as the "prodigal daughter". In "Dangerous", Professor Xavier was aware that the Danger Room had become sentient and kept her enslaved, whereas "Danger.exe" depicts her as gaining sentience in the same episode to help challenge and train the X-Men. David Meenan of SlashFilm argues that "Danger.exe" reinterprets "Dangerous" to be about two daughters—Polaris being Magneto's and Danger being Xavier's—breaking away from the paths chosen by their fathers.

- The episode "Danger.exe" the founding of X-Corp is lifted from the "The Man from Room X" storyline from New X-Men Annual #2001 (September 2001) by writer Grant Morrison and artist Leinil Francis Yu, and Gambit's resurrection as the Horseman of Death is featured from the X-Men (Vol. 2) #184 (May 2006) story "The Blood of Apocalypse Part Three of Five: War - What Is It Good For?" by writer Peter Milligan and artist Salvador Larroca.
- "The Dead Man's Hand" features elements from "The Blood of Apocalypse Part Four of Five: Love and Death" from X-Men (Vol. 2) #185 (May 2006) by writer Peter Milligan and artist Salvador Larroca, especially during Rogue and Gambit's confrontation.
