= Days of Future Past (disambiguation) =

"Days of Future Past" is a comic book storyline published in Uncanny X-Men in 1981.

Days of Future Past may also refer to:

- "Days of Future Past", a two-part first season episode of X-Men: The Animated Series
- X-Men: Days of Future Past, a 2014 science fiction superhero film based on the comics storyline
- Days of Future Passed, a 1967 album by the Moody Blues
- A song on the album 2021 Senjutsu by Iron Maiden
- "Passed the Future", a storyline in the science fiction comedy webtoon series Live with Yourself!
