= List of X-Men: The Animated Series episodes =

The animated series X-Men (or X-Men: The Animated Series) debuted on October 31, 1992, on the Fox Network as part of the "Fox Kids" Saturday morning lineup. The plot was loosely adapted from famous storylines and events in the X-Men comics, such as the Dark Phoenix Saga, Days of Future Past, the Phalanx Covenant, and the Legacy Virus. The show features a team line-up similar to that of the early 1990s X-Men comic books: the lineup largely resembles that of Cyclops' Blue Team, established in the early issues of the second X-Men comic series. Cyclops, Wolverine, Rogue, Storm, Beast, Gambit, Jubilee, Jean Grey and Professor X were featured as the X-Men. All 76 episodes were directed by Larry Houston.

== Synopsis ==
The series' first thirteen episodes were notable for being possibly the first time that an American animated series had a full season of episodes flow one into the next as a single continuing narrative, something the series producers fought heavily for. However, starting with season three, most episodes (except for multi-part stories) were shown in random order.

Each episode was assigned two different numbers internally. One was for script order, which indicates the number assigned by the production company. The other was for the production order, which are the official episode numbers assigned by Fox Children's Network, indicating the order in which they received the episodes. These both vary from the order in which the series aired after season three. According to series writer Steven Melching, the script order is the "best guide in terms of overall series continuity, as this is how the stories were originally envisioned to flow together."

The X-Men also appeared on Spider-Man: The Animated Series in episodes "The Mutant Agenda" and "Mutants' Revenge". Storm later appeared in the three-part episode "Secret Wars" on the good side against the evil side. The series ended after the episode "Graduation Day", which aired on September 20, 1997. The X-Men animated show was the longest-running Marvel Comics animated series, lasting for five years, with five seasons and a total of 76 episodes until their record was beaten by Ultimate Spider-Man, when its 77th episode aired on October 17, 2015.

The following list reflects the episode order as originally scripted. The television air-date order and DVD release order disregard the script order. This scripted order was adopted by Disney+ shortly after launch to present the episodes as intended.

== Series overview ==
Season	Episodes	Originally released	
Season	Episodes	First released	Last released
1	13	October 31, 1992	March 27, 1993
2	13	October 23, 1993	February 19, 1994
3	19	July 29, 1994	October 5, 1996
4	21	May 6, 1995	October 26, 1996
5	10	September 7, 1996	September 20, 1997

== Episodes ==
=== Season 1 (1992–93) ===
No. overall	No. in season	Title	Directed by	Written by	Original release date
1	1	"Night of the Sentinels"	Larry Houston	Mark Edward Edens	October 31, 1992
2	2	"Night of the Sentinels"	Larry Houston	Mark Edward Edens	November 7, 1992
Part I: A young teenager, Jubilee, has just started developing her mutant powers. Her worried foster parents report her to the authorities, and she is ambushed by a deadly new anti-mutant weapon, the Sentinel, while visiting a mall. Several members of the "X-Men" come to her aid and save Jubilee, bringing her to the X-Mansion while revealing their existence to the public. Despite being warned not to, Jubilee leaves to check on her parents and is captured by the Sentinels. The X-Men determine that Henry Peter Gyrich, a senior White House official tasked with creating a national database of mutants, is partially responsible for the creation of the Sentinels. After locating his HQ, they decide to stage an attack and wipe out the database with the approval of their leader, Charles Xavier. Part II: After destroying all the mutant files, the X-Men try to escape but are cornered by Sentinels. During the fight, Morph is seemingly killed and Beast is captured and imprisoned by the government. Xavier tracks Jubilee's mental signature to an abandoned factory where Gyrich and his secret ally Bolivar Trask are building and stockpiling Sentinels. The X-Men burn down the factory, destroy the stockpile of Sentinels, and rescue a captive Jubilee before she can be experimented on, but Gyrich and Trask escape while concealing all evidence of their work. Jubilee leaves her foster parents and accepts the opportunity to join Xavier's school and become a probationary X-Man.
3	3	"Enter Magneto"	Larry Houston	Jim Carlson & Terrence McDonnell	November 27, 1992
Magneto attempts to break Beast out of prison, but Beast refuses and insists on defending his actions at trial. He is denied bail, which angers the mutant Sabretooth and leads him to trash the courtroom. Police intervene and shoot him; Cyclops aids Sabretooth and brings him to the X-Mansion's infirmary, which does not sit well with Wolverine when he learns that, against his wishes, Xavier wants to rehabilitate Sabretooth. Later, Magneto attacks a military base and takes control of their missiles with plans to launch them and wipe out millions of human lives. The X-Men stop him and disable the missiles, but Magneto declares that they are now his enemies.
4	4	"Deadly Reunions"	Larry Houston	Don Glut (last name misspelled "Glutt")	January 23, 1993
Professor X puts Sabretooth through therapy to help him overcome his hateful past; angered by being asked to help, Wolverine deserts the team. Magneto stages his next attack at a chemical plant and calls out Xavier to face him. A flashback shows how Xavier and Magneto were once friends until Magneto swore vengeance against all humanity, leading Xavier to devote himself to the cause of peace. The X-Men confront Magneto but are easily bested by his superior power of magnetism. Xavier finally intervenes and uses his telepathy to overwhelm Magneto with a recreation of his traumatic past, before escaping with the X-Men. Sabretooth grabs Jubilee, admitting that he was hired to destroy the X-Mansion's equipment and had no desire to reform. Wolverine fights him off, but a guilt-ridden Xavier realizes that a final confrontation with Magneto is inevitable.
5	5	"Captive Hearts"	Larry Houston	Robert Skir & Martin Isenberg	January 30, 1993
Cyclops and Jean are captured by a group of deformed mutants called the Morlocks when they go out on a romantic date, much to Logan's hurt. The X-Men attempt a rescue, but their efforts are stymied by fierce resistance from the Morlocks. Storm battles their leader Callisto to save Cyclops from being forced to stay with them, and to spare the X-Men from having to hurt the Morlocks any further. After a fierce duel, Callisto is bested and Storm offers the Morlocks the chance to live at the X-Mansion, but they decline and insist on hiding until humanity accepts them willingly. Storm then orders Callisto to rule in her place until that day comes.
6	6	"Cold Vengeance"	Larry Houston	Michael Edens	February 6, 1993
Wolverine is bitter over Jean choosing Cyclops over him; coupled with his distrust of the Professor, he decides to leave the X-Men and travel into the Arctic. Sabretooth follows and attacks him; Wolverine is stranded in freezing waters following the fight and is rescued by Inuit villagers. He befriends the Inuit and briefly finds the peace he has long sought, but when Sabretooth destroys their village and threatens their lives to satisfy his vendetta, Wolverine accepts that he will never find true peace and must return to the X-Men. Meanwhile, Gambit proposes a journey to investigate the rumor that Genosha is a mutant-friendly island, much to the intense disapproval of Cyclops. Professor X, however, sees potential in the suggestion and approves the mission.
7	7	"Slave Island"	Larry Houston	Mark Edward Edens	February 13, 1993
The X-Men discover the truth behind Genosha as Gambit, Storm, Jubilee, and a host of other mutants are made to work as slaves in a large compound building a dam that will power the construction of more Sentinels. Storm tries to escape but is quickly recaptured and sent to solitary confinement in a small holding room, badly affecting her claustrophobia. Gambit is able to gain the guards' trust by revealing Jubilee's escape attempt. He is then able to escape with the help of Cable, a mercenary formerly employed by the Genoshan government to capture mutants. Gambit returns to break Jubilee and Storm out of the compound and together with the help of the other X-Men, they free all the mutants in Genosha and trigger an uprising against its leaders.
8	8	"The Unstoppable Juggernaut"	Larry Houston	Julianne Klemm	March 6, 1993
When the X-Mansion is trashed, the X-Men initially blame the Russian mutant Colossus after seeing him use his mutant powers at a construction site and later help him break out of jail (where Beast has already explained to him who they are). Wolverine and Jubilee trace a series of bank robberies to find the real culprit, Juggernaut, who had attacked the school hoping to kill Professor X (his adopted brother), and now intends to use his strength to become rich. The X-Men initially struggle to deal with Juggernaut's resilience and magic-based powers until Colossus helps them remove his psychic-resistant helmet; this allows Jean to place a hypnotic suggestion in his mind compelling him to forget the X-Men and leave the city peacefully. Colossus helps with repairs to the X-Mansion but decides against joining the X-Men, telling them he is interested only in finding his missing sister.
9	9	"The Cure"	Larry Houston	Mark Edward Edens	February 20, 1993
Warren Worthington (Archangel) has been supporting Dr. Adler's development to find a "cure" for mutant powers. Cable ambushes Archangel and learns the doctor has relocated to Muir Island, Scotland. Professor X calls a meeting where he informs the X-Men of Adler's cure. The team is divided, and Rogue's desperation for the chance to be "normal" leads her to volunteer herself as Adler's first patient, despite Gambit's attempts to dissuade her. It is later revealed that the real Dr. Adler had already been killed by Apocalypse. Since then, his ally Mystique has been impersonating him with the goal of finding suitable mutants to enslave for Apocalypse's cause. When Cable threatens her for Apocalypse's whereabouts, Rogue defeats him and decides against removing her powers. Having failed to enslave Rogue, Mystique settles on turning Archangel instead.
10	10	"Come the Apocalypse"	Larry Houston	Michael Edens	February 27, 1993
Apocalypse and Mystique transform Archangel and three other mutants who had sought Adler's cure into the "Horsemen of Apocalypse". Apocalypse then leads his Horsemen to stage an attack at the "World Peace Conference" in Paris. Professor X recognizes Archangel as one of the mutants from Muir Island and sends Rogue on a mission to investigate Muir Island. Rogue confronts "Dr. Adler", exposes Mystique's disguise, and destroys the machine she and Apocalypse had used to create the Horsemen. A confrontation at Stonehenge ends with the Horsemen defeated and Archangel having a portion of his dark soul absorbed by Rogue, causing him to flee in anguish. Apocalypse escapes in a concealed shuttle to his ship and departs for outer space, concluding that he will need to try a different approach to trigger war between humans and mutants...
11	11	"Days of Future Past"	Larry Houston	Julia Jane Lewald	March 13, 1993
12	12	"Days of Future Past"	Larry Houston	Robert Skir & Martin Isenberg	March 20, 1993
Part I: In a dystopian 21st century controlled by Sentinels, the renegade security officer Bishop is recruited by an elderly Wolverine and his ally Forge to embark on a risky mission: travel back in time to the 20th century and change the past by preventing the assassination of a prominent human political figure. Part II: Bishop (who believes Gambit to be the assassin) and the X-Men go to Washington to foil the assassination of Senator Robert Kelly. Gambit is ordered to stay behind, but he sneaks off to Washington and arrives just in time to prevent a duplicate "Gambit" from assassinating Senator Kelly. It is soon revealed that the duplicate Gambit is Mystique in disguise (who was attempting to frame Gambit and the X-Men for the assassination under orders from Apocalypse). Bishop tries to kill them both but has his time regulator destroyed by Rogue, sending him back to his own time. He is horrified to realize that it is unchanged, meaning something else has happened to alter the future.
13	13	"The Final Decision"	Larry Houston	Mark Edward Edens	March 27, 1993
Magneto uses the chaos of Kelly's foiled assassination to try and kill him, but is stopped by a group of Sentinels, who take Kelly with them back to their creator, Master Mold. Rescuing Magneto, the X-Men track the Sentinels to their base. Master Mold goes rogue and declares that there are no true distinctions between humans and mutants; thus, the Sentinels must rule over both. He orders Kelly's brain to be replaced with a computer as the first step, but the X-Men intervene with Magneto's aid and destroy Master Mold, inadvertently preventing the Sentinel-ruled future of Bishop's time from existing. Kelly is elected President and renounces his former anti-mutant views, instead promoting efforts to help them. His first act is to grant Beast a full pardon and his freedom from prison.

=== Season 2 (1993–94) ===
No. overall	No. in season	Title	Directed by	Written by	Original release date
14	1	"Till Death Do Us Part"	Larry Houston	Mark Edward Edens	October 23, 1993
15	2	"Till Death Do Us Part"	Larry Houston	Michael Edens	October 30, 1993
Part I: Scott and Jean get married whilst Wolverine takes out his frustrations in the Danger Room. The mysterious Mister Sinister uses a brainwashed Morph (who is tormented by having to betray his old friends) to manipulate and distract the X-Men; he tricks Gambit into kissing Rogue, maneuvers policemen into shooting Storm when she tries to break up a riot, lures Jubilee into the clutches of an anti-mutant organization called the Friends of Humanity, nearly kills Beast by sabotaging the Danger Room, and fools Professor X into secretly traveling to Antarctica. Part II: Mister Sinister and his Nasty Boys kidnap Cyclops and Jean while they are on their honeymoon. Meanwhile, the rest of the X-Men are either in mortal peril or bickering due to Morph's meddling. Beast is able to escape the Danger Room, Gambit recovers from kissing Rogue, Wolverine saves Jubilee from being publicly executed, and Storm is hospitalized but survives. Morph, disguised as Professor X, attempts to mislead the X-Men once more only to be sniffed out by Wolverine. He leads them to Sinister's hideout, where they rescue Scott and Jean. In Antarctica, the real Professor X meets Magneto, and the pair are engulfed by an avalanche.
16	3	"Whatever It Takes"	Larry Houston	Julia Jane Lewald	November 6, 1993
The fearsome mutant known as the Shadow King lures Storm to her adopted native village near Mount Kilimanjaro by "possessing" her spiritual son Mjnari. The Shadow King, who raised Storm as a young girl before Professor X found her, narrowly succeeds in taking control of her body before Rogue and Mjnari force him back into the "astral plane". Wolverine tracks down Morph to a rural encampment hoping to persuade him to return to the X-Men. After the ensuing fight, Wolverine reluctantly accepts Morph needs time on his own to heal his psychological damage. In Antarctica, Professor X and Magneto survive the avalanche and enter a jungle-like region, which they identify as the Savage Land. Here, Professor X can walk again, but they are unable to use their mutant powers.
17	4	"Red Dawn"	Larry Houston	Ted Pedersen & Francis Moss	November 13, 1993
Powerless, Xavier and Magneto use their wits to evade hostile dinosaurs. Omega Red is revived from cryogenic sleep by three corrupt Russian generals who ask him to help restore the former Soviet Union. Colossus goes to the X-Men for help to save his country and people. Jubilee is the only one present, and she agrees to help without hesitation. They manage to defeat the military forces sent by the generals, but Omega Red is too strong to overcome. Wolverine, Colossus & Jubilee hold out long enough for Storm, Gambit, and Rogue to come to their aid. With the help of Colossus and Darkstar (a former Soviet agent who decides to turn against the generals), Storm whips up a blizzard to freeze Omega Red solid. Darkstar arrests the generals for treason, and Colossus, reunited with his sister, again turns down an offer to join the X-Men to focus on rebuilding his home and country.
18	5	"Repo Man"	Larry Houston	Len Wein	November 20, 1993
Wolverine travels to Canada to meet a woman named Heather but is instead captured by her husband Vindicator and the Alpha Flight mutant team. A flashback shows Wolverine's past regarding Abraham Cornelius' adamantium procedure that turned him into "Weapon X", getting nursed back to health by Heather, his recruitment to Alpha Flight, and subsequent desertion to join the X-Men. General Chasen and Vindicator hope to study Wolverine and replicate the process that gave him his powers; when he resists, they decide to euthanize him and extract his skeleton instead. Heather is horrified and immediately resigns. The rest of Alpha Flight also revolt and help Wolverine escape. Wolverine confronts Vindicator and says he will not show mercy if they come looking for him again. Meanwhile, the rest of the X-Men are worried about Professor X's mysterious disappearance. Jean searches for Professor X through Cerebro and is unable to find him but manages to guide Wolverine home.
19	6	"X-Ternally Yours"	Larry Houston	Julianne Klemm (first name misspelled "Julaianne")	December 4, 1993
While monitoring the Danger Room during Cyclops's training, Gambit receives a disturbing phone call (this causes him to lose control of the Room, forcing Rogue to save Cyclops). Returning to Louisiana, Gambit becomes embroiled in an ancient feud between the Thieves and the Assassins when his brother Bobby is kidnapped. Trading himself to save Bobby, he falls into the clutches of his ex-fiancé, Bella Donna. She forces Gambit to marry her shortly before the two groups are set to pay homage to the "X-Ternal". The X-Men arrive just as Gambit exposes Bella Donna's plot to frame the Thieves for sacrilege. Jean telepathically informs the X-Ternal of the Assassins' treachery; at Gambit's request, she spares their lives but strips Bella Donna of her powers. Professor X and Magneto are captured by the Savage Land Mutates, whom Magneto created years earlier in a failed scheme to turn the Savage Land into a mutant paradise. The Mutates declare that they serve the Savage Land's new "master".
20	7	"Time Fugitives"	Larry Houston	Michael Edens	December 11, 1993
21	8	"Time Fugitives"	Larry Houston	Elliot Maggin	December 18, 1993
Part I: In the year 3999, Cable learns that his world (and family) will be erased as a consequence of Bishop traveling back in time to prevent Apocalypse from releasing a genetically engineered plague that mutants will be blamed for spreading by the Friends of Humanity, resulting in Bishop's previously averted future coming to pass once again. The X-Men, convinced of Bishop's goals after he saves Beast from being infected, destroy Apocalypse's lab only to be killed when the tyrant unleashes his full power. Witnessing these events through his AI, Cable realizes in horror that he must allow the plague to spread in order to preserve his timeline. Part II: Cable intercepts Bishop shortly after he travels to the past and the two mutants engage in a brutal fight until Bishop escapes with the X-Men's help. Realizing that violence will achieve nothing, Cable tries a different approach and purposefully infects Wolverine with the plague; his healing factor generates antibodies that allow for a vaccine to be created by Beast. A satisfied Apocalypse chooses to make his escape rather than pursue the X-Men. Bishop returns to his own timeline and discovers everything is still the same (although there is no longer a plague and the X-Men are still remembered). Cable, on the other hand, finds that his world is saved and his son is alive.
22	9	"A Rogue's Tale"	Larry Houston	Robert N. Skir & Marty Isenberg	January 8, 1994
Due to Professor X's disappearance, Ms. Marvel's suppressed consciousness begins to break free. Rogue's foster mother, Mystique, lures Rogue to the hospital where she sees Ms. Marvel's comatose body and remembers the past. She remembers how she ran away from her abusive, mutant-hating father and found Mystique. Mystique raised her and eventually sent her on a mission to attack Ms. Marvel, resulting in Rogue absorbing her powers permanently. Rogue also absorbed her consciousness – leaving Ms. Marvel in a coma and Rogue plagued with Ms. Marvel's psyche. Professor X healed her through a psychic barrier, and Rogue deserted Mystique to join the X-Men. With the barrier failing, Ms. Marvel attempts to consume Rogue's mind and take over her body permanently. Using Cerebro, Jean is able to fully merge the dueling psyches, and Rogue rejects Mystique for making her "worse than a killer". She later visits Ms. Marvel and places flowers by her bed, revealing that she now has her memories and will fight for the both of them. As she leaves, the comatose hero is seen to shed a single tear.
23	10	"Beauty & the Beast"	Larry Houston	Stephanie J. Mathison	January 15, 1994
Beast falls in love with Carly, a blind young woman for whom he hopes to restore her sight. After the Friends of Humanity vandalize the hospital for employing a mutant, Beast is told to stay away from Carly and quickly succumbs to intense self-loathing and anger. An enraged Wolverine listens to Jean's advice to handle the situation "delicately" and poses as a bigoted human to infiltrate the Friends. He talks to their leader Graydon Creed regarding his plans to exterminate mutants and recognizes him as Sabretooth's estranged son. Carly is abducted on Creed's orders, and Beast risks his life to save her. Wolverine uses Cerebro to expose Graydon's mutant parentage to the Friends, wrecking his public image and resulting in his followers abandoning him. Beast sadly reflects that society is not ready for a human and a mutant to live openly together and cuts his ties with Carly. Her formerly bigoted father thanks him for saving her, and Carly vows that Beast will always be in her heart.
24	11	"Mojovision"	Larry Houston	Brooks Wachtel	February 5, 1994
A deformed alien dictator, Mojo, kidnaps Cyclops, Wolverine, Jean, Rogue, Beast, and Storm with the intention of casting them as the newest stars of his intergalactic entertainment network after his current star, Longshot, quits over a contract dispute. The X-Men are forced against their will to act out various movie scenes, which Mojo rigs so that they are inevitably "killed" for the enjoyment of himself and his viewers. Just as Jean is about to be finished off by a simulation of the Punisher, she disrupts the broadcast with her telepathy. When Mojo's producer Spiral tries to regain control, Longshot forces her to return the X-Men to their home dimension; Mojo's studio is destroyed and he's forced to agree to Longshot's demands. In the heart of the Savage Land, Professor X and Magneto find Magneto's former citadel and encounter a dangerous new mutant named Sauron and his master: Mister Sinister.
25	12	"Reunion"	Larry Houston	Len Wein	February 12, 1994
26	13	"Reunion"	Larry Houston	Michael Edens	February 19, 1994
Part I: Sinister enlists Morph to set a trap so the Nasty Boys can capture Jean. Magneto and Xavier are rescued by Ka-Zar, who resents Magneto for interfering in the Savage Land's natural development but agrees to help them. Infiltrating the citadel to rescue Ka-Zar's enslaved tribe, the three are confronted by Sinister's followers; Ka-Zar escapes while Xavier and Magneto are captured once again. Sinister reveals his plan: having modified Magneto's technology, he can remove and transfer the abilities of choice mutants at will to those loyal to him, creating a "perfect" race suitable for conquering humanity. Sauron uses his hypnotic stare on Xavier, forcing him to send a distress call to the X-Men. Despite knowing that it's a trap, the team flies in to save their mentor's life. Part II: While the other X-Men are easily overwhelmed by Sinister's followers without their powers, Wolverine escapes and runs into Ka-Zar. The latter frees his people as Wolverine distracts Sinister and enables Xavier to destroy the lab's equipment, restoring the powers of the X-Men and Magneto. After a fierce battle, the Nasty Boys flee to save themselves, the Mutates surrender, Morph is freed from his brainwashing, and Sinister's physical body is reduced to pieces by Cyclops' optic blasts, which Jean then scatters telepathically. Magneto thanks Xavier but assures him that they remain enemies before departing. As the X-Men leave in the Blackbird, a gleeful Sauron notes that with the "outlanders" gone from the Savage Land, he can finally realize his own ambitions...

=== Season 3 (1994–96) ===
After the five-part "Phoenix Saga", episodes were aired in a more random sequence. Also, due to animation problems with a few episodes, several did not air until the fourth or even fifth season.

No. overall	No. in season	Title	Directed by	Written by	Original release date
27	1	"Out of the Past"	Larry Houston	Michael Edens	July 29, 1994
28	2	"Out of the Past"	Larry Houston	Len Wein	August 5, 1994
Part I: The Morlocks are raided by the Reavers, mercenaries led by Yuriko, a vengeful Japanese ex-lover of Wolverine's. They claim their prize - an ancient alien vessel the Morlocks had dug up - which releases a telepathic signal that only Xavier can detect using Cerebro. Seeking to punish Wolverine for the death of her father (a scientist killed during his escape from Dr. Cornelius' lab after being turned into Weapon X), Yuriko lures him into the sewers and uses the Morlocks as hostages to force him to open the vessel. Jubilee, having followed in secret with Gambit's help, intervenes. Xavier decodes the signal, realizing that the vessel is a prison ship, just as Wolverine slashes it open to save Yuriko's life when her cybernetics are short-circuited by its power source. Part II: A dangerous parasitic alien lifeform, the Spirit Drinker, is freed from the prison ship and unleashes its powers, absorbing the souls of the Reavers and the captive Morlocks. With Xavier's help, Beast gathers the X-Men to try and determine how to stop the creature from reaching the surface, where it will be able to feed freely. When Jubilee's soul is taken as well, Wolverine and Yuriko stay behind to hold off the Spirit Drinker until it claims Yuriko's soul next. The X-Men realize the creature is weak to electricity and use a subway third rail to destroy it, restoring the absorbed souls. Yuriko calls a draw and leaves Wolverine in peace. Xavier's mind, now affected by the alien signal, is plagued with visions of a strange woman in a starship asking him for help.
29	3	"The Phoenix Saga, Part I: Sacrifice"	Larry Houston	Michael Edens	September 5, 1994
30	4	"The Phoenix Saga, Part II: The Dark Shroud"	Larry Houston	Mark Edens	September 6, 1994
31	5	"The Phoenix Saga, Part III: Cry of the Banshee"	Larry Houston	Michael Edens	September 7, 1994
32	6	"The Phoenix Saga, Part IV: The Starjammers"	Larry Houston	Mark Edens	September 8, 1994
33	7	"The Phoenix Saga, Part V: Child of Light"	Larry Houston	Michael Edens	September 9, 1994
Part I: An agent of the Shi'ar Empire, Erik the Red, takes over the Eagle One space station. Guided by his visions, Xavier instructs Cyclops, Beast, Wolverine, Jean, and Gambit to intercept and take the places of a scientific team being dispatched to Eagle One to investigate. They find Erik has brainwashed the crew and intends to use the station as a firing platform to destroy a fleeing starship that matches the one Xavier had seen previously. The X-Men accidentally trigger a meltdown that destroys Eagle One while trying to stop Erik, who escapes unscathed. While returning to Earth, the residual energy from the damaged starship consumes the shuttle as Jean pilots it; her desperation and strong emotions attract a mysterious entity which merges with her and saves the shuttle... Part II: The shuttle crash-lands in Jamaica Bay. As the X-Men watch, Jean (wearing a new costume) emerges from the water in a fiery blaze and renames herself "Phoenix". She is subsequently hospitalized with memory loss and struggles to understand the growing power inside her. Xavier's guilt and stress over Jean's condition manifests itself as an astral projection of his inner darkness, which blames the X-Men for his suffering and attempts to destroy them psychically. Phoenix asserts herself and restores Xavier's mind; temporarily stepping down as leader of the X-Men, the professor isolates himself on Muir Island under Moria MacTaggert's care. The woman from his visions appears in his room via teleportation, introducing herself as the banished Shi'ar princess Lilandra Neramani... Part III: Lilandra explains how her brother, the corrupt Shi'ar emperor D'Ken, seeks to weaponize the ancient M'Kraan Crystal to dominate the entire universe. In defiance, she stole the crystal and sought out Xavier as they are "born" of the same mind (something the Shi'ar believe occurs in all sentient life). Juggernaut and his partner Black Tom Cassidy, employed by Erik the Red, assault Muir Island and take Lilandra with them to Cassidy Keep. With the aid of Tom's cousin Sean, the X-Men attempt a rescue but are easily defeated by Gladiator of the Imperial Guard, as Erik and Black Tom escape while Juggernaut is thrown into the sea. Just as all seems lost, Phoenix is summoned by a desperate Xavier, overwhelms Gladiator, and hurls him into space on a fiery streak. Phoenix tells Lilandra that they must hurry to safeguard the crystal as D'Ken arrives to personally confront them... Part IV: Leaving Storm and Jubilee with Xavier, a weakened Phoenix transports the remaining X-Men to Lilandra's star cruiser. A band of space pirates called the Starjammers attack the cruiser, taking Cyclops as a captive and extracting the M'Kraan on the orders of their human leader Corsair. Corsair strikes a bargain with D'Ken to trade the M'Kraan for a full Imperial pardon; secretly, he tells Cyclops that his true plan is to have the X-Man assassinate D'Ken during the exchange as revenge for the emperor's murder of Corsair's wife many years earlier. Phoenix alone realizes that Corsair is Cyclops' biological father after reading his mind. D'Ken anticipates Corsair's betrayal and has the Imperial Guard lying in wait; the X-Men and Phoenix locate D'Ken's ship and a fierce battle ensues. Lilandra regains the M'Kraan only to be captured by D'Ken before she can escape. Seizing the crystal, he claims its full power for himself. Phoenix warns the X-Men that billions of lives are now at stake... Part V: D'Ken is drawn into the crystal itself and becomes omnipotent with the desire to form his own universe, a process that will consume billions of worlds and destroy the current universe. The Starjammers turn and run while Phoenix attempts to battle D'Ken inside the crystal but are drawn in along with the Imperial Guard as the universe contracts around them. The three factions unite to challenge D'Ken while Lilandra pleads with him, but neither force nor words can stop him. With no other options, Phoenix is forced to draw upon Jean's empathy for her teammates to unite with the crystal itself and obliterate D'Ken's consciousness. Before departing for the Sun, where the crystal must be hidden so that it can never be accessed again, Phoenix kisses a heartbroken Cyclops. Back on Earth, Lilandra and Xavier recognize that their differing responsibilities will keep them apart while Corsair expresses hope that he and Cyclops will have a chance to speak one day. As the X-Men leave for home, Xavier tells Cyclops that the phoenix is meant to be reborn, and so Jean may one day come back to them...
34	8	"No Mutant Is an Island" (Note: "No Mutant Is an Island", "A Deal with the Devil", and "Longshot" episodes were originally part of season three; however, due to animation problems they were held back for two years; and consequently, Jean Grey's resurrection was not properly explained.)	Larry Houston and Frank Squillace	Sandy Scesny	September 21, 1996
Cyclops cannot move past his grief over Jean's loss and lashes out at Xavier, questioning why he should fight for a lost cause before stripping off his uniform and throwing it at the professor's feet. Returning to the orphanage where he grew up, Cyclops reconnects with Sarah, his only friend from childhood, and who now runs the orphanage. He learns that Zebediah Killgrave, a wealthy developer, is now financing the nearly bankrupt orphanage and adopting several mutant teenagers as his own children. Cyclops looks into Killgrave's motives and discovers that he is in fact a mutant himself with mind-manipulation abilities. Using the teenagers as brainwashed anti-human soldiers, he overthrows the governor and plans to incite civil war. A news crew captures footage of Killgrave firing on the orphanage and burning it down while Cyclops protects Sarah; this results in his arrest while the children are freed from his control. Leaving Sarah to rebuild, Cyclops returns to the X-Men with renewed faith in Xavier's ideals.
35	9	"Obsession"	Larry Houston	Adam Gilad	September 24, 1994
Driven mad by his experience serving Apocalypse, Archangel has obsessively spent his entire fortune in search of a means to kill him. A newly hired scholar gives him what he seeks, and Archangel tracks Apocalypse to the Statue of Liberty to use it. Despite Gambit's pleas, Rogue (having previously absorbed part of Archangel's dark side) feels compelled to help him. Beast gains access to Apocalypse's ship, learning to his surprise that it is fact sentient and willing to help. Beast weaponizes the ship's defenses to trap Apocalypse, but Archangel's rage results in the trap's failure. Apocalypse explains that he had set both Archangel and the X-Men up to finally be rid of them and orders the ship to self-destruct before escaping many light-years away into deep space. The X-Men fight their way out as the remains of the ship sink beneath the ocean to Beast's dismay. Archangel refuses the X-Men's insistence that he join them, vowing to never serve anyone except himself again before flying away to await Apocalypse's return.
36	10	"Longshot"	Larry Houston and Frank Squillace	Steven Melching & David McDermott	October 5, 1996
While taking driving lessons with Wolverine, Jubilee is surprised by Longshot, who is being pursued by a band of warriors led by Spiral. Wolverine assists them in driving off Spiral's party. Questioned by the X-Men, Longshot slowly regains his memories and recalls how he betrayed Mojo and took leadership of a rebellion against his dictatorship; an attempt by Mojo to then brainwash Longshot to serve him again failed when his allies stopped the procedure and sent Longshot to the X-Men's dimension to save him. Mojo arrives on Earth in person with Spiral and his crew, deciding to conquer it and setting up a televised "hunt" to once again exploit the X-Men for high ratings. Splitting up, the X-Men save Jubilee from Mojo's clutches, wreck the broadcast, and threaten him personally; having had enough, the crew hastily returns to their own dimension. Longshot is heartened by the X-Men's conviction and chooses to go back as well, vowing to see his rebellion through to completion.
37	11	"Cold Comfort"	Larry Houston	Len Uhley	February 4, 1995
Iceman, one of the five original X-Men, is forcibly subdued by his old team for breaking into a government installation. Questioned by Jubilee, Xavier explains that Iceman's defiant personality made it impossible for him to take orders, and he eventually chose to give up heroism, settling down with his girlfriend Lorna Dane until she disappeared. Iceman explains that he's been tracking any known clues as to her whereabouts. A moved Jubilee frees Iceman and joins him in returning to the installation. When the X-Men follow, they are confronted by a government-sponsored mutant team called X-Factor. To Iceman's shock, not only is Lorna a member, but is also in a relationship with her teammate Havok. Team leader Forge backs up Lorna when she chooses to stay with X-Factor; Iceman decides to resume his civilian identity as Bobby Drake, telling Xavier that he's content.
38	12	"Savage Land, Strange Heart"	Larry Houston	Marty Isenberg & Robert N. Skir	September 10, 1994
39	13	"Savage Land, Strange Heart"	Larry Houston	Marty Isenberg & Robert N. Skir	September 17, 1994
Part I: Sauron kidnaps Storm to the Savage Land in order to feed from her mutant energy. Wolverine, Beast, Rogue & Jubilee go after him back to the Savage Land. Part II: Garokk fuses with the island's volcano and the surging planetary force below it.
40	14	"The Dark Phoenix, Part I: Dazzled"	Larry Houston	Jan Strnad (last name misspelled "Strand")	November 12, 1994
41	15	"The Dark Phoenix, Part II: The Inner Circle"	Larry Houston	Stephen Levi (first name misspelled "Steven")	November 12, 1994
42	16	"The Dark Phoenix, Part III: The Dark Phoenix"	Larry Houston	Larry Parr	November 19, 1994
43	17	"The Dark Phoenix, Part IV: The Fate of the Phoenix"	Larry Houston	Brooks Wachtel	November 26, 1994
Part I: The Phoenix Force continues to inhabit Jean's body. Jean is beginning to lose control and the Phoenix begins to brazenly take over at will. When the Inner Circle Club learn of the Phoenix's power, they use Jason Wyngarde to create a new history in the mind of the confused Jean/Phoenix. While protecting Dazzler, a mutant club singer from being abducted by the Inner Circle, Cyclops and the X-Men get caught in this dangerous affair. Part II: As Professor X and Emma Frost battle for psychic control of Jean, the Inner Circle members quarrel over how to dispose of their prisoners, the X-Men. Meanwhile, the Phoenix begins to grow in her thirst for new evil sensations and turns on both the Inner Circle and the X-Men. Part III: The transformation of the Dark Phoenix is complete and she begins her rampage. When the X-Men confront the Phoenix and ask it to give up Jean's body, Dark Phoenix vows to destroy the team, defeating them easily. This forces the X-Men to try to figure out a way to expel the Phoenix Force from Jean's body without hurting her. Part IV: In the Shi'ar court, Lilandra reveals Dark Phoenix's vast destruction of the D'Bari solar system and declares that Dark Phoenix has transformed into the Destroyer of legend and must die. Professor Xavier calls for a Trial of Combat for the custody of Jean Grey/Dark Phoenix which pits the X-Men to battle the Shi'air Imperial Guard on the Blue Area of the Moon as both the fate of Jean's entire being and the universe itself hangs in the balance.
44	18	"Orphan's End"	Larry Houston	Douglas Booth	February 25, 1995
Cyclops discovers that Corsair is his father. Corsair is on the run from Shi'ar authorities, who demand that Cyclops turn him over to them.
45	19	"Love in Vain"	Larry Houston	Martha Moran	February 10, 1996
Wolverine witnesses the crash of a spaceship carrying the Colony, humanoid insects which overwhelm him. Meanwhile, Rogue has a run-in with Cody, her first boyfriend, whom she unwillingly drained with a kiss with her developing mutant powers. Rogue brings him to the headquarters and asks Professor X for some time off to spend a weekend with Cody (much to Gambit's annoyance). The rest of the X-Men proceed to search for Wolverine and get attacked by the Colony. Wolverine, Cody, and Rogue are infected by Colony spores and begin to transform into insect-like creatures, but Wolverine reverses his transformation due to his healing abilities. Wolverine lets Rogue absorb his powers so that she can also heal herself. Rogue realizes that Cody brought her to the Colony so that they could be together as Colony members. Eventually, Professor X helps the X-Men escape by telepathically freeing the creature hosting the Colony. Rogue tries to convince Cody to leave with her, but he refuses, being part of the Colony now. As the Colony leaves Earth, Rogue is comforted by Wolverine and Gambit.

=== Season 4 (1995–96) ===
Some of the Season 4 episodes were aired during Season 3 to compensate for episodes in that season being pushed back.

No. overall	No. in season	Title	Directed by	Written by	Original release date
46	1	"The Juggernaut Returns" (Note: "The Juggernaut Returns", "Nightcrawler", and "Weapon X, Lies, & Videotape" episodes were originally a part of season four; however, they were pushed up to air during season three to make up for "No Mutant Is an Island", "A Deal with the Devil", and "Longshot" episodes being pushed back.)	Larry Houston	Julianne Klemm	May 6, 1995
Juggernaut's life is at risk when someone else uncovers the Ruby of Cyttorak and claims the powers of Juggernaut for himself.
47	2	"A Deal with the Devil"	Larry Houston	Eric Lewald	September 14, 1996
Omega Red, the destruction machine from the former Soviet Union and a sworn enemy of Wolverine is thawed and sent two miles beneath the ocean to salvage a disabled, toxic Russian nuclear submarine threatening to break up near Hawaii. His only condition is that Wolverine and Storm go down with him as insurance.
48	3	"Sanctuary"	Larry Houston	Steven Melching & David McDermott	October 21, 1995
49	4	"Sanctuary"	Larry Houston	Jeff Saylor	October 28, 1995
Part I: Weary of battling for mutant supremacy, Magneto offers to transport all mutants to an orbiting asteroid named Asteroid M where they can live peaceful and human-free lives; however, Fabian Cortez tricks Magneto into an escape pod and launches him into space. Part II: As Magneto plummets helplessly to Earth, Fabian Cortez assumes control of Asteroid M and sends hundreds of missiles toward Earth. Meanwhile, Rogue goes to help the X-Men and tries to find a missing Gambit. Magneto frees himself and returns in time to destroy both the missiles and Asteroid M. Everyone escapes before the asteroid is destroyed and they all return home (Gambit included) Meanwhile, Cortez is rescued from the descending asteroid by Deathbird and Apocalypse.
50	5	"Xavier Remembers"	Larry Houston	Stephanie Mathison	April 27, 1996
When Professor X suffers a slight concussion, his powerful psychic mind is suddenly open to manipulation. The Shadow King takes advantage of this and takes possession of Xavier, leaving his mind trapped on the Astral Plane.
51	6	"Courage"	Larry Houston	Sandy Scesny & Michael Edens	September 23, 1995
The day Morph rejoins the X-Men, terrorists attack a top-secret, high-tech weapons factory; the alert interrupts his homecoming party.
52	7	"Secrets, Not Long Buried"	Larry Houston	Mark Onspaugh	February 17, 1996
When Cyclops flies solo to a tiny, western, desert community to see an old friend, his plane is blasted out of the sky. Injured and unable to use his powers, he struggles into town, only to discover his friend is missing and the town is caught in the grips of a militant, mutant-only, anti-human hate group: the Children of the Shadow.
53	8	"Nightcrawler"	Larry Houston	Len Uhley	May 13, 1995
Gambit, Rogue, and Wolverine take a ski trip in Germany. While Gambit & Rogue seem to be largely enjoying each other's company and time together, Wolverine is restless and longs for some action. When he hears reports of a demon hiding in a local monastery, his investigation reveals not a demon, but a mutant, Nightcrawler, whose devilish appearance is in stark contrast to his peaceful and deeply religious nature. Later the townsfolk attack and burn the monastery. The X-Men convince the townsfolk not to fear what they do not understand, Wolverine, too, learns something about the nature of faith.
54	9	"One Man's Worth"	Larry Houston	Richard Mueller	September 9, 1995
55	10	"One Man's Worth"	Larry Houston	Gary Greenfield	September 16, 1995
Part I: Trevor Fitzroy, Bantam, and Nimrod travel back in time to 1959 and kill Xavier as Master Mold ordered them. This creates an alternate present timeline, where a mutant-sentinel war has destroyed everything. Bishop and Shard arrive in 'alternate present', where sentinels battle violently against 'The Leader' Magneto, and his followers who include husband and wife Wolverine and Storm. Bishop & Shard recruit Wolverine & Storm to help stop Fitzroy, but they fail. Part II: Failing to stop the assassination of Xavier, Bishop, Shard, Storm & Wolverine travel forward to the future, a future changed so much that Forge's time travel machine has never been tested and Forge has no idea who these four time travelers are. After they convince Forge, they go back a few minutes before Xavier dies and save him. Everything reverts to normal.
56	11	"Proteus"	Larry Houston	Bruce Reid Schaefer	September 30, 1995
57	12	"Proteus"	Larry Houston	LuAnne Crocker	October 7, 1995
Part I: Moira MacTaggert is trying to help her son Kevin (Proteus), but when he escapes from Muir Island she calls on the X-Men for help. Proteus who has never been off the island is wreaking havoc while trying to find his father. Part II: When Proteus discovers that his deadbeat dad is a prominent politician, he storms the Union Hall right in the middle of his dad's campaign speech on 'family values.' Proteus tells his father that he is his son, his father denies it and runs off in horror, crying for help. Angered at his father's reaction, Proteus creates havoc, but Charles later calms him down, and he stops the rampage. Then he goes back to Muir Island with Moira MacTaggert.
58	13	"Family Ties"	Larry Houston	Marley Clark	May 4, 1996
Shortly after Magneto breaks into the X-Mansion, High Evolutionary and his New Men capture him, Quicksilver, Beast, Wolverine, and Scarlet Witch, to do experiments on them. He also reveals that Magneto is Quicksilver & Scarlet Witch's father. The other X-Men later defeat High Evolutionary and his New Men and save the captured mutants. During this episode, High Evolutionary transformed Wolverine into a werewolf.
59	14	"Bloodlines"	Larry Houston	Len Uhley	October 26, 1996
On Halloween, Nightcrawler gets a mysterious message. He is informed that his birth mother (whom he never knew) is in trouble. He turns to the X-Men for assistance. Jubilee is baffled that Nightcrawler wants to help the mother who abandoned him. Nightcrawler admits there has been pain, but his faith in God has helped him overcome her rejection. The plot thickens when one of the team members recognizes Nightcrawler's mother's voice.
60	15	"Lotus and the Steel"	Larry Houston	Ted Pedersen & Francis Moss	February 3, 1996
Wolverine, losing control, quits the X-Men and returns to the rural Japan of his younger days, in an effort to find himself. He works peacefully with a former spiritual teacher, the monk Oku, to build a temple. But the neighboring village is about to be attacked by bandits, led by the merciless Silver Samurai, unless payment is made. Some of the villagers want to resist and ask Wolverine for help. Wolverine is torn. This is just the sort of thing he had wanted to leave behind. Wolverine bests the Samurai in single combat by taking advantage of Samurai's habit of teleporting behind him: Wolverine anticipates the move and disables the teleportation device, humiliating Samurai.
61	16	"Weapon X, Lies, and Video Tape"	Larry Houston	Steven Melching & David McDermott	June 11, 1995
A cryptic photograph unleashes a flood of maddening and painful memories in Wolverine that threaten to drive him insane. To keep his mind from being torn apart, Wolverine and Beast travel to the one location that may hold the answers to his hidden past; the ruins of the top-secret Weapon X lab where Wolverine's bones were laced with adamantium. There he encounters other former "test subjects" – Sabretooth, Maverick, and Silver Fox – who are suffering similar mental breakdowns. Later they find out that many of their memories were implanted, and their true memories are destroyed with the lab.
62	17	"Have Yourself a Morlock Little X-Mas"	Larry Houston	Larry Parr & Eric Lewald	December 23, 1995
As all of the X-Men prepare for a festive Christmas, foster child Jubilee is thrilled. She, Storm, and grouchy humbug Wolverine go last-minute shopping in Manhattan, only to be caught in a life-or-death crisis involving Leech, a young member of the Morlocks. Leech needs a blood transfusion, so Wolverine's blood is given and then Leech gets better. Additionally, Storm agrees to give back to Callisto her title as the Morlock's official leader.
63	18	"Beyond Good and Evil, Part 1: The End of Time"	Larry Houston	Steve Cuden	November 4, 1995
64	19	"Beyond Good and Evil, Part 2: Promise of Apocalypse"	Larry Houston	Jan Strnad (last name misspelled "Strand")	November 11, 1995
65	20	"Beyond Good and Evil, Part 3: The Lazarus Chamber"	Larry Houston	Michael Edens	November 18, 1995
66	21	"Beyond Good and Evil, Part 4: End and Beginning"	Larry Houston	Dean Stefan	November 25, 1995
Part I: In 3999, Cable attacks Apocalypse, but Apocalypse steals his time device and uses it to arrive at the axis of time which causes Bishop to be thrown off course and trapped at the axis of time. Present day, Jean and Scott finally get married again. Just as they are driving off after the ceremony, the Nasty Boys kidnap Jean – leaving Scott behind. Shard (Bishop's sister) travels to the present day in search of Bishop and arrives in time to see Mr. Sinister trying to take Xavier. Part II: Apocalypse kidnaps another psychic mutant. Lilandra warns Xavier of Apocalypse, and Xavier determines that he is capturing psychics. In anticipation, Shard and Wolverine go to protect Psylocke. Still, she is kidnapped by Magneto and taken to Apocalypse in the axis of time control center. In 3999, Cable reveals a plan to go back in time. Part III: Cable uses a time-traveling ship to go back to the past but unbeknownst to him he is thrown off course by Apocalypse. Cable lands in the present. The X-Men decide to help him in destroying Apocalypse's Lazarus Chamber. They go back in time to ancient Cairo however Apocalypse predicted this and uses the opportunity to teleport Xavier to the Axis. Part IV: Cable and the X-Men destroy the Lazarus Chamber. They then use Cable's computer and Cerebro to trace a homing device on the Professor to the control axis where Apocalypse reveals his plan to use the psychics to destroy all time and recreate a universe, where he will rule unchallenged. Feeling that he was deceived by Apocalypse, Magneto attacks him when Cable arrives and joins the attack. Apocalypse begins draining the psychics which causes time and history to start to disappear. Bishop sees this and releases the psychics. Sinister & the Nasty Boys retreat. The heroes defeat the 4 horsemen of Apocalypse. In the end, the psychics move Apocalypse to the Astral Plane. The Axis janitor is revealed to be Immortus. Using Cable's time and spaceship, everyone else is returned to the present time at the Mansion. Cable travels back to his time.

=== Season 5 (1996–97) ===
"Beyond Good and Evil" was meant to be the series finale, until Fox ordered more episodes at the last minute, but at a reduced budget. To save money, Saban produced episodes five to ten in-house rather than involving Graz Entertainment, to whom it had outsourced production of the series. Saban hired a studio in the Philippines, the Philippine Animation Studio (which also worked on the second season of the 1994 Fantastic Four series) because the prior animation studio AKOM was unavailable due to other projects. As such, starting with episode five, this season had a distinctly different animation style.

No. overall	No. in season	Title	Directed by	Written by	Original release date
67	1	"The Phalanx Covenant"	Larry Houston	Steven Melching & David McDermott	September 7, 1996
68	2	"The Phalanx Covenant"	Larry Houston	Steven Melching & David McDermott	September 7, 1996
Part I: The X-Men are attacked by the Phalanx, a race of techno-organic aliens seeking to assimilate all life on Earth. The alien Warlock allies with Beast, Forge, and Mr. Sinister to defeat the Phalanx. Part II: The X-Men are attacked by the Phalanx, a race of techno-organic aliens seeking to assimilate all life on Earth. Warlock, Beast, Forge, and Mr. Sinister are trying to find help but Magneto at first sees this as his chance to watch humanity go down until he learns his son Quicksilver has been captured by the Phalanx. Beast with the help of Mr sinister creates a virus to eradicate the Phalanx, the group realizes the Phalanx headquarters on earth is the Empire State building. The group works together and Warlock consumes the virus and allows himself to be captured, releasing the virus, the Phalanx is defeated and Warlock finds his partner still alive.
69	3	"Storm Front"	Larry Houston	Mirith Colao	November 2, 1996
70	4	"Storm Front"	Larry Houston	Brooks Wachtel	November 9, 1996
Part I: The alien Arkon comes to Earth and begs Storm to return with him to his planet, to save it from meteorological chaos which threatens his people. After much pleading, Storm agrees but leaves a clue for the other X-Men to follow. Once successful, Storm is proclaimed savior throughout this world. Then Arkon asks her to marry him. Part II: Spectacular preparations for Storm's wedding to Arkon proceed quickly. Meanwhile, the X-Men discover that Arkon is a ruthless tyrant.
71	5	"The Fifth Horseman"	Larry Houston	Steve Melching & David McDermott	February 8, 1997
Fabian Cortez kidnaps Jubilee because Apocalypse is trapped in the Astral Plane and needs a host body. Cortez brings her to a temple, but Beast comes and rescues Jubilee and destroys the temple. In the end, when Apocalypse comes out of a portal, he takes over Cortez's body, transforming it into his form and banishing Cortez from it.
72	6	"Jubilee's Fairytale Theatre"	Larry Houston	Brooks Wachtel (last name misspelled "Watchel")	November 16, 1996
Jubilee leads a group of school children on a tour of a cave on Mansion property, only to be caught in a cave-in. As the water in the cave rises, she keeps the kids calm by spinning a medieval fairy tale of knights, princesses, trolls, and dragons. Some of these characters might just seem to resemble the X-Men. As she tells the kids the stories, the real X-Men arrive and save them.
73	7	"Old Soldiers"	Larry Houston	Len Wein	February 22, 1997
Wolverine thinks back to the time when he fought during World War II and teamed up with Captain America. Wolverine & Captain America must break into a Nazi establishment to rescue the kidnapped scientist Andre Cocteau and fight the Red Skull.
74	8	"Hidden Agendas"	Larry Houston	Steve Melching & David McDermott	September 13, 1997
Sam Guthrie's parents have contacted Professor Xavier about their son's mutant powers. Rogue goes back to the South to check things out and finds Sam living the life she never had. Family and friends support the young Sam (codenamed Cannonball), but Rogue must teach Cannonball how the rest of the world lives when shadowy Army officials attempt to use him.
75	9	"Descent"	Larry Houston	Steve Melching & David McDermott	September 6, 1997
In London, England's Victorian era, two scientists, Dr. James Xavier and Dr. Nathaniel Essex, hotly debate Charles Darwin's theory of natural selection. Essex believes mutants are the next genetic step forward and begins a bizarre experiment involving mutant evolution. He creates for himself a minion, Jack, to procure mutant organs for him. Essex uses the mutant DNA of Jack’s victims to transform himself. The origin of Mr. Sinister is revealed, as Dr. Xavier attempts to stop Essex before he goes too far.
76	10	"Graduation Day"	Larry Houston	James Krieg	September 20, 1997
At a Mutant/Human Relations Summit, Henry Peter Gyrich attacks and cripples Professor Xavier with an energy disruptor. The X-Men and Moira MacTaggert try to save Xavier, but all seems lost. Lilandra comes and has a cure, but Professor Xavier must leave and go with her to the Shi'ar Empire to be cured. Meanwhile, Magneto makes final preparations to take over the world with his mutant army, but on the eve of the invasion Cyclops, Wolverine, and Jean Grey infiltrate Genosha to tell Magneto that Xavier is dying. He halts the assault on humankind out of respect for his greatest enemy, equal, and only friend. The final scene of the show depicts a lasting moment as all of the X-Men and Magneto stand outside the X-Mansion and say goodbye to Xavier as he leaves with Lilandra and her ship to the Shi'ar home world.

== Spider-Man: The Animated Series crossovers ==
No.	Title	Directed by	Written by	Original release date
17	"Chapter IV: The Mutant Agenda"	Bob Richardson	Story by : John Semper and J. M. DeMatteis; Teleplay by : Michael Edens	September 30, 1995
Spider-Man begins to worry about his growing mutation. In order to seek a cure, he heads to the Xavier mansion, where he encounters the X-Men. A brief fight occurs, after which Spider-Man explains his plight to Xavier, who tells Spider-Man that he cannot cure him. Beast tells Spider-Man to go to Herbert Landon, who is working on a cure for mutants. Afterward, Landon's men capture Beast. While Spider-Man is watching Landon's demonstration, the facility is attacked by the Hobgoblin. However, a mysterious telekinetic force holds the ceiling in place long enough for Spider-Man to escape. Wolverine begins to worry about Beast's disappearance. He discovers that Beast spoke with Spider-Man before he disappeared, and sets out to find Spider-Man. Note: This episode is a crossover with Spider-Man: The Animated Series season 2 episode 4.
18	"Chapter V: Mutants' Revenge"	Bob Richardson	Story by : John Semper and Michael Edens; Teleplay by : Francis Moss and Ted Pedersen	October 7, 1995
Wolverine catches up with Spider-Man, who is hot on the trail of the missing Beast. Meanwhile, the Hobgoblin steals the mutant technology information that Landon had prepared for Kingpin. In the meantime, Landon's assistant Genevieve struggles with keeping her secret of being a telekinetic mutant, who saved Spider-Man from the collapsing ceiling. This is revealed after the Hobgoblin causes an accident that mutates Landon into an evil, giant multi-armed creature that tries to kill the heroes. Note: This episode is a crossover with Spider-Man: The Animated Series season 2 episode 5.
