= Terry Kavanagh =

American comic book editor and writer

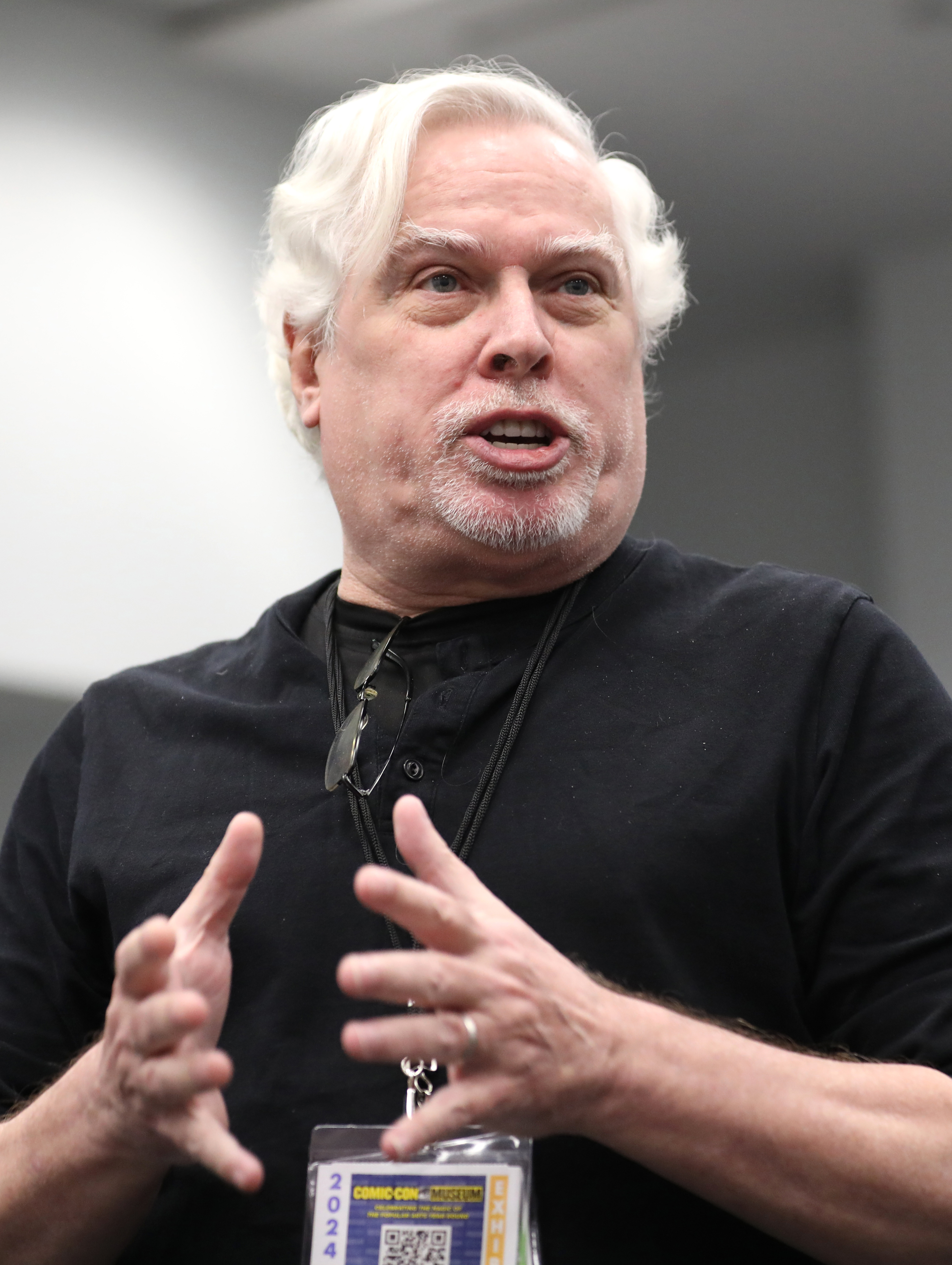
- Kavanagh at the 2024 WonderCon
- Born: Terence Kavanagh
- Areas: Writer, Editor
- Notable works: Marc Spector: Moon Knight; Web of Spider-Man; X-Man

Terence "Terry" Kavanagh (/ˈkævənɑː/ KAV-ə-nah) is an American comic book editor and writer.

== Career ==
Kavanagh was a Marvel Comics editor from 1985 to 1997. Titles he edited during that time included Marvel Comics Presents and Nick Fury, Agent of S.H.I.E.L.D. Writer/artist Alan Davis, who Kavanagh edited on Excalibur, said "Terry Kavanagh spoiled me, gave me near total freedom, and encouraged me to experiment."

In 1987, he began to write for Marvel with his first published story "Cry Vengeance!" appearing in Kickers, Inc. #4 (Feb. 1987). He later wrote such titles as Marc Spector: Moon Knight, Avengers: Timeslide, X-Man and X-Universe. In Web of Spider-Man #100 (May 1993), Kavanagh and artist Alex Saviuk gave the lead character "Spider-Armor". He wrote the Spider-Man/Punisher/Sabretooth: Designer Genes one-shot the following month. Kavanagh was one of the writers on the "Maximum Carnage" storyline which ran through the various Spider-Man titles in 1993. The first Black Cat limited series was co-written by Kavanagh and Joey Cavalieri in 1994. Kavanagh pitched a storyline involving the return of Spider-Man's clone, which then formed the basis of the "Clone Saga" which began in Web of Spider-Man #117 (Oct. 1994). Kavanagh's last new comics project was the Before the Fantastic Four: The Storms limited series in 2000–2001.

In 2011, Kavanagh co-founded the Internet startup company www.mybeanjar.com. In 2025, Kavanagh would be a recipient of the Inkpot Award at the annual San Diego Comic Con.

== Bibliography ==
=== Marvel Comics ===
- 2099 A.D. #1 (1995)
- 2099 Unlimited #7–8 (1994–1995)
- All New Exiles #∞, #1–3, 5 (1995–1996)
- All New Exiles Vs. X-Men #0 (1995)
- The Amazing Spider-Man #375 (1993)
- The Amazing Spider-Man Super Special #1 (1995)
- Avengers #384–399 (1995–1996)
- Avengers West Coast #64 (1990)
- Before the Fantastic Four: The Storms #1–3 (2000–2001)
- Blade: The Vampire-Hunter #9–10 (1995)
- Cloak and Dagger #16–19 (1991)
- Felicia Hardy: The Black Cat #1–4 (1994)
- Fury/Agent 13 #1–2 (1998)
- Hulk #½ (1999)
- Iron Man #319–332 (1995–1996)
- Iron Man: Age of Innocence #1 (1996)
- Kickers, Inc. #4, 6–8, 12 (1987)
- Marc Spector: Moon Knight #35–60 (1992–1994)
- Marvel Comics Presents #5 (Daredevil) (1988)
- Marvel Super-Heroes vol. 2 #2 (Daredevil) (1990)
- Nightwatch #1–12 (1994–1995)
- Rise of Apocalypse #1–4 (1996–1997)
- The Spectacular Spider-Man #174 (1991)
- The Spectacular Spider-Man Super Special #1 (1995)
- Spider-Man #19–20, 25, 36, 41–43 (1992–1994)
- Spider-Man Super Special #1 (1995)
- Spider-Man Unlimited #1 (1993)
- Spider-Man/Punisher/Sabretooth: Designer Genes #1 (1993)
- Ultraforce/Avengers Prelude #1 (1995)
- Uncanny X-Men #369–373, 375–380 (1999–2000)
- Uncanny X-Men '95 #1 (1995)
- Venom Super Special #1 (1995)
- Web of Spider-Man #77–80, 97–120, 123–125, Annual #9–10 (1991–1995)
- Web of Spider-Man Super Special #1 (1995)
- What If...? #86 (1996)
- X-Man #15–30, −1, 32–47, 49–62 (1996–2000)
- X-Man '96 #1 (1997)
- X-Man/Hulk '98 #1 (1998)
- X-Men (Vol. 2) #89–94, 97–99 (1999–2000)
- X-Men '99 Annual #1 (1999)
- X-Men Spotlight on Starjammers #1–2 (1990)
- X-Men Unlimited #11, 14, 17 (1996–1997)
- X-Universe #1–2 (1995)

Preceded by Chuck Dixon	Marc Spector: Moon Knight writer 1992–1994	Succeeded by n/a
Preceded by Howard Mackie	Web of Spider-Man writer 1993–1995	Succeeded by Todd Dezago
Preceded by Len Kaminski	Iron Man writer 1995–1996 (with Dan Abnett)	Succeeded by Jim Lee and Scott Lobdell
Preceded by Bob Harras	The Avengers writer 1996 (with Bob Harras)	Succeeded by Mark Waid
Preceded by John Ostrander	X-Man writer 1996–2000	Succeeded by Steven Grant
Preceded by Joe Casey	Uncanny X-Men writer 1999–2000	Succeeded by Chris Claremont
