= Rise of Apocalypse =

1996 comic book miniseries

The Rise of Apocalypse
- Apocalypse as featured in The Rise of Apocalypse #3

Publication information
- Publisher: Marvel Comics
- Schedule: Monthly
- Format: Limited series
- Genre: Superhero
- Publication date: October 1996 – January 1997
- No. of issues: 4
- Main character: Apocalypse

Creative team
- Artist(s): Terry Kavanagh; James Felder (#3–4)
- Penciller(s): Adam Pollina; Anthony Williams (#4)
- Inker(s): Mark Morales; Harry Candelario (#1); Al Milgrom (#4)
- Letterer(s): Comicraft; Richard Starkings (#4)
- Colorist: Christian Lichtner
- Editor: Mark Powers

Collected editions
- The Rise of Apocalypse: ISBN 0-7851-0586-7

The Rise of Apocalypse is a four-issue limited series published in 1996 by Marvel Comics. The series was written by Terry Kavanagh, and drawn by Adam Pollina.

== Plot summary ==
5,000 years ago, a baby is found in the Egyptian desert by a band of nomad raiders. The child is raised and named En Sabah Nur by the tribe's leader, Baal, who teaches the boy survival of the fittest. During the same time, Egypt is ruled by Pharaoh Rama-Tut who, in actuality, is the time traveller Kang the Conqueror. Kang arrived from the future to claim En Sabah Nur as his heir, because the boy will grow up to become the supervillain Apocalypse. Nur's tribe is destroyed by Rama-Tut's armies. Before Baal dies as well, he tells Nur that he is destined for greater things. Seeking revenge, En Sabah Nur travels to Rama-Tut's city where he hides as a slave and falls in love with Nephri, the sister of Rama-Tut's general Ozymandias. However, Nephri rejects Nur due to his disfigured appearance. Nur's mutant powers awaken, and he enslaves Ozymandias while Rama-Tut flees. Having renamed himself Apocalypse, Sur sets out to destroy the weak.

== Collected editions ==
The series has been collected into a trade paperback:

- The Rise of Apocalypse (collects Rise of Apocalypse and X-Factor #5-6, 160 pages, March 1998, ISBN 0-7851-0586-7)

== In other media ==
- Apocalypse's origin, similar to the Rise of Apocalypse, appeared in the X-Men: Evolution episode, "Dark Horizon, Part II". This version was abandoned as a baby before he was found by Baal's tribe of bandits, named "En Sabah Nur", and grew up to become a powerful warrior. After the Pharaoh Rama-Tut learned of Nur's power and slaughtered the bandits, the latter's full powers manifested, leading to him killing Rama-Tut's forces, renaming himself "Apocalypse", and taking the pharaoh's pyramid-like vessel and a device within it called the Eye of Ages. Using it to empower himself further, he intended to use it turn all humans on Earth into mutants, but was sealed in the vessel by his high priests for fear of his power.
- The Rise of Apocalypse is adapted in the eponymous episode of X-Men '97. After Mother Askani saved the X-Men from Asteroid M before it exploded, she sent Professor X, Magneto, Rogue, Beast and Nightcrawler back to 3000 BC Egypt to stop the creation of Apocalypse (voiced by Ross Marquand). Their mission was unsuccessful, as he took control of a Celestial ship, forcing Pharaoh Rama-Tut (voiced by John de Lancie) to return to his time, and Apocalypse killing Magneto at the process.
