= Adam Pollina =

American comic book artist and penciller

- Areas: Writer, Penciller, Inker
- Notable works: X-Force; Slingers

Adam Pollina is an American comic book artist and penciller. He is best known for his work on Marvel Comics' X-Force, Rise of Apocalypse, and Angel: Revelation, Charlemagne at Defiant, Rai: Fallen World, and Wrath of the Eternal Warrior #2 at Valiant, Loose Cannon and Big Daddy Danger at DC Comics, and Pyrate Queen from Bad Idea Comics.

== Early life and education ==
Adam Pollina graduated with honors from the Rhode Island School of Design.

== Career ==
=== Early career ===
He started his comic career immediately after college, illustrating for Friendly Comics in 1992, an adult comics imprint of Personality Comics, co-owned by Eric Shefferman. Later, at Shefferman's Triumphant Comics, he illustrated Chromium Man.

Pollina's work was spotted by writer Jeph Loeb, and in 1994 Loeb and Pollina collaborated on Loose Cannon, a DC Comics four-issue limited featuring Superman.

=== Marvel: 1995–1998 ===
Pollina's work was then noticed by Marvel Comics founder Stan Lee, which led to work at Marvel. Pollina's Marvel included a run on X-Force, the limited series Rise of Apocalypse, the occasional issue of Generation X, and a variety of other contributions.

Pollina began to pencil X-Force in 1995 with issue #44 and continued as regular penciler until #81 in 1998.

=== Video game industry ===
During this time, Pollina began working in the video game industry, illustrating character design for EA Sports on such groundbreaking games as James Bond: Golden Eye, NBA Street Vol. 2, SSX Tricky, Def Jam Vendetta Wrestling, and God of War for Sony Activision.

Approached by Stan Winston Studios in 2001, Pollina was hired to design the female Terminator in Terminator 3: Rise of the Machines.

In 2002, he produced the creator-owned limited series Big Daddy Danger, which was published by DC Comics and purchased by Disney Studios in 2003.

In 2002, Pollina directed his first music video, Enemy, for the band Sevendust. Pollina went on to direct several other music videos for bands like My Morning Jacket, Tsar, Elkland, and The Blue Van.

=== 2008: return to Marvel ===
In 2008 Pollina returned to Marvel, teaming up with writer Roberto Aguirre-Sacasa to retell Angel's origin story in the five-issue mini series Angel: Revelations. The story tells how Warren overcomes the trials and tribulations of a cold family life, his growing physical mutation while living at boarding school, abuse of power from authority figures, and deals with a religious zealot on a murdering crusade across America.

=== 2010–2017: work outside of comics ===
In 2010 Pollina relocated to Bali, Indonesia, founded a bespoke atelier and began creating custom jewelry and garments for an elite list of clients. His designs were featured in the 2012 Biennale in Venice as well as Art Basel Miami 2013.

In 2014, Pollina became creative director for the world-renowned arts/music festival Wonderfruit.

=== 2018–present ===
Pollina returned to the comics industry in the beginning of 2018, working on Secret Weapons #0 written by Eric Heisserer. Shortly after, Pollina returned to DC Comics to illustrate the Outlaws Annual Volume 3, written by Jeph Loeb. In 2019, he illustrated the sci-fi epic series Fallen World by Dan Abnett for Valiant.

In 2021, Adam Pollina, Matt Kindt, and Matt Hollingsworth created the fantasy book Whalesville, published by Bad Idea.

Pollina partnered with an all-star creative team to launch Rebel Studios, a multi-platform gaming and content provider. Their first project, titled EY3K0N, was a genesis NFT collection successfully launched in 2022.

== Bibliography (selected) ==
=== Marvel Comics ===
- X-Force #44-48, 50, 52–56, 62, 65–67, 69–72, 74, 75, 77–81, -1 (1995–1998); some material collected in Deadpool Classic Companion TPB
- Rise of Apocalypse (4-issue mini-series, 1996–1997)
- Slingers #0 (1998)
- "Yes, Jubilee, There is a Santa Claus," in Generation X Holiday Special #1 (1999)
- Angel: Revelations #1-5 (2008)

=== DC Comics ===
- Loose Cannon #1-4 (1995)
- Big Daddy Danger #1-9 (2002–2003)
- Red Hood and the Outlaws Annual #3 (2019)

=== Valiant Comics ===
- Fallen World #1
- Harbinger Renegade #2 – cover B
- RAI (Deluxe Edition)
- Ninja-K #1 (2017)
- Secret Weapons
- Wrath of the Eternal Warrior #2, 4 — covers
- Shadowman Vol. 1: Fear Of The Dark

=== BAD IDEA ===
- Pyrate Queen #1-4 (2021)
- Refuse x Last Resorts #1 (2021)
- Whalesville x Rocks and Minerals #1 (2021)

=== Unproduced ===
- Hulk Hogan vs. the Incredible Hulk (Hollywood concept art)
