= Morph (X-Men: The Animated Series and X-Men '97 character) =

- X-Men: The Animated Series / X-Men '97 character
- Promotional art of Morph from X-Men '97 by Amelia Vidal
- First appearance: "Night of the Sentinels (Part 1)"; (October 31, 1992)
- Based on: Changeling by: Roy Thomas; Werner Roth
- Voiced by: Ron Rubin (X-Men: The Animated Series); J. P. Karliak (X-Men '97)

In-universe information
- Species: Human mutant
- Gender: Non-binary
- Affiliation: X-Men
- Powers and abilities: Shapeshifting

Morph is a fictional superhero appearing in the American animated superhero series X-Men: The Animated Series—which aired on Fox Kids from 1992 to 1997—and its revival X-Men '97, which has been streaming on Disney+ since 2024. Morph is introduced as an X-Men member who sacrificed themself (Note: Morph uses both he/him and they/them pronouns. This article uses they/them in accordance with X-Men '97.) to protect Wolverine from a Sentinel in the show's premiere. The second season revealed that Mister Sinister resurrected and experimented on Morph, turning them into his minion. After the X-Men free Morph from Sinister's control, they are taken to Muir Island to recuperate. Morph briefly rejoins the X-Men in season four, but realizing they still suffer from mental trauma, they decide to depart. Morph permanently rejoins the X-Men in X-Men '97, with the first season exploring their trauma following Sinister's experimentations and their romantic feelings for Wolverine.

Morph is loosely based on the minor character Changeling, who briefly joined the team in the comics. During development of The Animated Series, the showrunners wanted an X-Man to die in the premiere to foreground the series' serious tone. They initially chose to assign this fate to Thunderbird; however, upon realizing the implications of killing their only Native American character, they replaced him with Changeling. While Morph's death was supposed to be permanent, they were brought back due to their popularity with audiences. With limited storylines involving Changeling to draw from the comics, writing for Morph proved difficult for the writers. X-Men '97 sees Morph discovering their gender identity as a core aspect of their character arc, being depicted as non-binary; a decision crew members of the original series described as aligning with their vision of the character.

Despite their few appearances in X-Men: The Animated Series, Morph became a fan favorite. Discussions regarding have focused on their death as unprecedented for a children's program of the time. Critics responded positively to Morph's storylines following their resurrection and the depiction of their mental trauma from these events. Their portrayal as non-binary in X-Men '97 has been praised by critics.

== Appearances ==
=== X-Men: The Animated Series ===
Morph was introduced in the premiere as a member of the X-Men. Using their shapeshifting abilities, Morph acted as comic relief and had a close relationship with Wolverine, who appreciated their comedic talent. In the premiere's second part, Morph is killed while on mission with the X-Men, sacrificing themself to save Wolverine from a Sentinel's laser blast, devastating the latter.

The second season premiere revealed that Morph had been recovered by Mister Sinister, who revived and brainwashed them using a mind control implant. Under Sinister's influence, Morph seeks revenge on the X-Men, wreaking havoc with their shapeshifting, blaming the team for betrayal and abandonment. In the season finale, thanks to psychic assistance from Professor X, Morph is able to break free from Sinister's control, turning a laser meant to kill Cyclops on Sinister instead. After their brain implant was removed at the X-Mansion, a traumatized Morph began recovery with Moira MacTaggert at Muir Island, minimizing their appearances for much of the series.

In the fourth season episode "Courage", Morph rejoins the X-Men, having a significant role. Despite Moira believing they need more time to recover, Morph goes back to the X-Mansion. Shortly after arriving, they and Wolverine go to investigate a robbery at a factory that, unbeknownst to them, manufactures Sentinels. After returning to the mansion, the team is attacked by Sentinels, causing Morph to freeze up and inadvertently let Professor X be captured. Hoping to make up for their mistake, Morph flies to the location of Professor X, helping the team, and destroying Master Mold. Despite overcoming their fears, Morph realizes they are not ready to permanently rejoin the X-Men and chooses to leave.

Morph makes a final appearance in the series finale, impersonating Professor X, who had been attacked by Henry Peter Gyrich and was dying. During these events, Morph permanently rejoins the X-Men. When Lilandra Neramani comes to take Professor X to the Shi'ar homeworld to heal, Morph and the rest of the team bid him farewell.

=== X-Men '97 ===
==== Season 1 ====
In the premiere, Magneto becomes the X-Men's new leader. Soon afterwards, it is revealed that Sinister had switched Jean with a clone, Madelyne Pryor. Under his influence, Madelyne uses her psychic powers to attack the X-Men, giving Morph visions of Sinister taunting them. Despite still being afraid of Sinister, Morph helps lead the X-Men to his lab, where they fight Madelyne. During the fight, Madelyne hypnotizes Morph, causing them to fight their teammates, until the team manages to break Sinister's hold over her.

Sometime later, the mutant nation of Genosha is attacked by Sentinels, leading to the death of Gambit and massacre of numerous other mutants. Following these events, Morph and the X-Men find Bolivar Trask about to commit suicide by jumping off a building, who reveals Sinister forced him to participate in the Genosha genocide. After Rogue lets Trask fall to his death, to Morph's shock, he transforms into a Prime Sentinel and attacks the team.

Realizing Bastion was the mastermind behind the creation of the Prime Sentinels and attack on Genosha, the X-Men split into two teams. While the Blue Team is handling a rogue Magneto, Storm leads Morph and the rest of the Gold Team to Bastion's compound, successfully severing his hold over the Prime Sentinels. Going to Asteroid M, Bastion overpowers the Blue Team, before Morph and the Gold Team arrive and defeat him. However, when American missiles strike the asteroid, it starts plummeting towards Earth.

While Jean, Storm, Rogue, and Magneto use their powers to halt Asteroid M's descent, Morph stays by Wolverine's side, who is comatose after the adamantium from his skeleton was removed by Magneto. Unsure of their fate, Morph takes on Jean's form to confess their love for him. The X-Men are able to use their powers and return Asteroid M to space, but it suddenly vanishes along with most of the team. Half of the X-Men are sent to either Ancient Egypt in 3000 BC or 3060 AD; with Morph, Wolverine and Storm ending up in the latter.

== Development ==
=== Creation and progression in X-Men: The Animated Series ===
==== The X-Men's sacrificial lamb ====
According to executive story editors Eric and Julia Lewald, during development of X-Men: The Animated Series, the crew wanted a member of the X-Men to die in the pilot, to show that "there were stakes to [the X-Men's] struggle". Series director and producer Larry Houston stated that another reason factoring in the decision to kill off a character was to "do something different [and] unique" from other animated programs of the period. Head writer Mark Edward Edens clarified that killing off a character early on in the cartoon's run was also done to help "ramp up the emotions"; He further joked that killing of a character is something that "animation writers always dream of".

Initially, this position was to be filled by John Proudstar / Thunderbird, who had joined the X-Men in Giant-Size X-Men #1 (1975) but died shortly thereafter in Uncanny X-Men #95 (1975). However, before the pilot's second draft, the crew realized that killing off their only Native American character would have negative implications, so it was decided to replace him with someone else. According to the Lewalds, they specifically looked for a minor character who had "died helping the X-Men". Searching through the comics for any X-Men members who fit their criteria, Eric Lewald describes how there were only "three or four" such characters, with Changeling being one of them. Upon discovering Changeling, the crew members opted to use him in Thunderbird's place.

==== Adapting Changeling ====
Changeling first appeared in Uncanny X-Men #35 (1967), by Roy Thomas and Werner Roth, as an adversary of the X-Men and member of Factor Three. In Uncanny X-Men #65 (1970), it was revealed that Changeling, suffering from a terminal illness and wanting to make amends for his past actions, had joined the X-Men under the guise of Professor X, in order to allow the latter to prepare for the Z'Nox invasion. This retcon established that Changeling was killed in battle while disguised as Professor X, making him the first X-Men member to die in the line of duty. Unlike many other characters from the X-Men franchise, Changeling remained dead for many years until he was resurrected in the 2025 series Astonishing X-Men.

According to Houston, the character's name was changed from Changeling to Morph due to the DC Comics character Beast Boy, who also has shapeshifting abilities. At the time of the show's development, Beast Boy had been a core member of The New Teen Titans under the codename Changeling, resulting in Marvel lawyers demanding that their character's codename being altered.

Regarding the use of Changeling / Morph as the X-Man who died in the premiere of The Animated Series, Comic Book Resources (CBR) writer Ryan Bradley argued that with the character's death decades before the show's premiere, he could be killed off "without upsetting the hardcore fans". Fellow CBR writer Brandon Zachary recognized that Changeling's minor role in the comics made him "more or less a blank slate [for the writers] to play with". James Whitbrook of Gizmodo and Variety's Jordan Moreau have both noted that Morph was loosely based on Changeling, with Moreau even describing Morph as "an original character".

==== Popularity and resurrection ====
Morph's death in the show's premiere was supposed to be permanent, but due to their popularity with audiences, Fox Kids demanded that the character be brought back. Specifically, a focus group consisting of young viewers who had seen the first season described Morph as their favorite character and lamented them being "killed [...] off early in episode two". Eric and Julia Lewald have stated that due to Morph's death initially being permanent, with their resurrection occurring due to the network's demands, they "may not have been thinking of [them] as much for stories" in comparison to other X-Men characters. Due to the character's minor role in the comics, it was difficult for the writers to find any storylines to adapt in The Animated Series that featured Changeling, acknowledging that no major story arcs include him.

=== Return and evolution in X-Men '97 ===
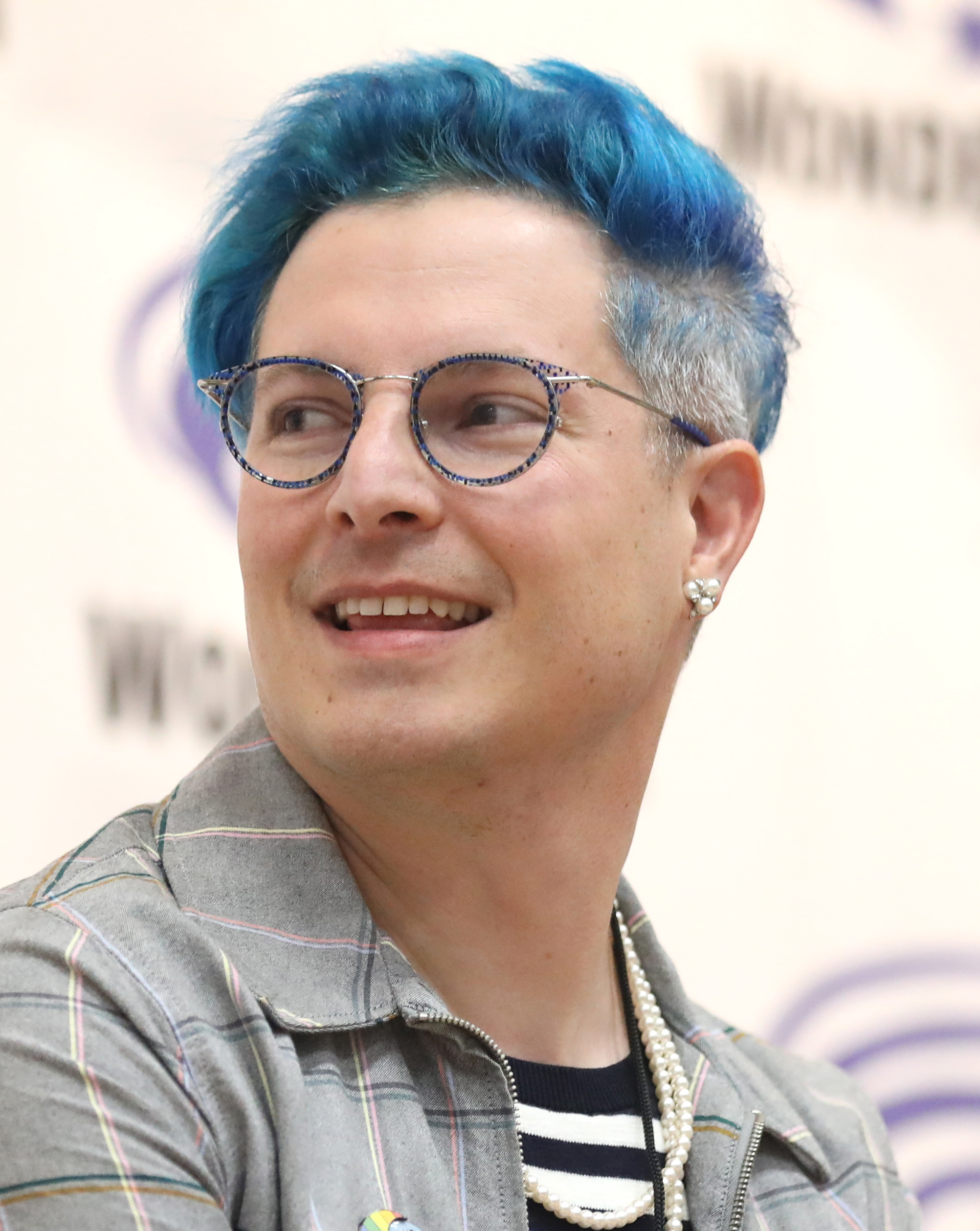
J. P. Karliak voices Morph in X-Men '97.

==== Appearance and personality ====
Morph's involvement in the revival series X-Men '97 was first revealed at San Diego Comic-Con (SDCC) in July 2022. At the panel, series creator Beau DeMayo announced that Morph would be depicted as non-binary—using they/them pronouns—and sport an altered appearance with "a bald head, light gray skin, completely white eyes, and no nose"; this look was based on an alternate universe version of Morph who appeared in the series Exiles. At SDCC 2023, it was confirmed that Morph would officially rejoin the X-Men and be part of the show's main cast. DeMayo, a fan of The Animated Series, described Morph's death as "really set[ting] the stakes" and acknowledged that the character has a "very interesting relationship with the team because of [their] trauma". DeMayo further stated that the show's depiction of Morph would be a "lighter take on the character" compared to the original series.

For X-Men '97, J. P. Karliak replaces Ron Rubin as Morph's voice actor. Concerning his performance, Karliak stated that he did not try to sound too familiar to Rubin; knowing during casting that Morph would be non-binary, he opted to use his own voice to ground the character closer to reality. During voice recording, Karliak would go through multiple variations of his lines, such as "pure fury, wisecracking, bawling his eyes out, [or] near-deadpan", with voice director Meredith Layne to figure out which one fit Morph best.

Regarding Morph's position among the X-Men and their role at the beginning of the series, Karliak described the character as trying to figure out their relationship to the rest of their teammates, as well as themself, following all the trauma they had endured. Karliak acknowledged that Morph as a character who has experienced much trauma, both physical and psychological, which they try to mask with humour. Regarding this, recognizing them as X-Men '97's comic relief, Karliak believes Morph is "burying a lot of things" and that having "[them] say less was actually the smarter way to go for somebody who's internalizing a lot".

For the show's second season, Karliak noted that Morph has finally found their footing within the X-Men and a sense of belonging. According to him, feeling secure in their position in the team, Morph will start to question their own future and evolve.

==== Gender identity ====
Although Morph is depicted as non-binary within X-Men '97, prior to the show's premiere it was announced that they would not be identified as such on-screen, due to the series being set in the 1990s, when the term "non-binary" was not commonly known; Morph continues to use he/him pronouns within the series. Despite this announcement, Rogue does at one point refer to Morph using the proper pronouns. Regarding Morph's development in the series as non-binary, director Jake Castorena viewed this as a natural development for the character, given their shapeshifting abilities. Castorena also described Morph's altered physical appearance in the series as representing their attempt to move past the trauma, and that their "identity is to have multiple identities". Concerning Morph's depiction as non-binary, both Houston and Eric Lewald have stated that this portrayal aligns with their original intentions for the character. Karliak has stated that Morph is on a "gender journey that will unfold as time passes and he goes through the eras of terminology that we've lived through already".

==== Relationship with Wolverine ====
Screenshot from "Fire Made Flesh" depicting Morph looking suggestively at an apparition of Wolverine taking a shower. This scene sparked a discussion over Morph's relationship with Wolverine and has been cited regarding their romantic feelings for him.

Prior to the premiere of X-Men '97, stated that Morph would have an "interesting buddy relationship with Wolverine" throughout the series. Following release of the third episode, "Fire Made Flesh", Whitbrook speculated that Morph's feelings for Wolverine were non-platonic. When Madelyne Pryor, as the Goblin Queen under Sinister's influence, causes the X-Men to experience various hallucinations, Morph sees Wolverine naked in the showers and playfully asks if he wants company.

After the season 1 finale, DeMayo confirmed Morph's feelings for Wolverine are romantic. By assuming Jean's form, Morph is able to safely express feelings for Wolverine without fear of rejection; DeMayo also clarified that Morph still has not fully admitted their feelings for Wolverine. According to DeMayo, Morph was always intended to have romantic feelings for Wolverine, as indicated in the show bible.

Karliak has stated that while he does want Morph to get a significant other as X-Men '97 progresses, he is against the character starting a relationship with Wolverine. Regarding this opposition, Karliak finds the trope of a queer individual being in love with a straight person overused, preferring for Morph and Wolverine to remain best friends.

== Reception ==
Morph has often been recognized as a fan favorite from X-Men: The Animated Series, being described as such by Nick Nafpliotis of AIPT Comics, as well as Variety's Moreau. Moreau also viewed Morph's death in the show's premiere as a "shocking twist", while Gizmodo's Whitbrook argued Morph's death is what helped them achieve popularity. Writing for SlashFilm, Ethan Anderton, who grew up watching the series, stated that Morph was a popular character among fellow viewers of the series.

Attention was also afforded to Morph's storyline involving their resurrection as Mister Sinister's thrall during the show's second season, and the exploration of their trauma in the fourth. Nafpliotis praised Morph's resurrection as Sinister's minion, viewing it as a mature story arc. Polygon writer Carli Velocci noted that Morph had a "surprisingly complex arc throughout later seasons", following their resurrection. Velocci gave particular praise to Morph's role in the fourth season, which displayd the mental health issues they experienced after their encounter with the Sentinels; they viewed it as a "pretty sensitive portrayal of trauma, especially for a 1990s kids' cartoon".

Morph's depiction as non-binary within X-Men '97 received primarily positive reviews. Bill Desowitch of IndieWire responded positively to the depiction of Morph as non-binary in X-Men '97, praising the series' "greater celebration of queer diversity", while Velocci described this development as logical, acknowledging that shapeshifters across fictional works often change into various genders. Gizmodo's Whitbrook, while also commending the inclusion of openly queer character within the cast of X-Men '97, was critical of the decision to make Morph, a character with "a visible mutation", non-binary instead of a more human-presenting character.
