= X-Men: The Animated Series =

American animated superhero television series

- Genre: Superhero
- Based on: X-Men by: Stan Lee; Jack Kirby
- Developed by: Mark Edward Edens; Sidney Iwanter; Eric Lewald
- Voices of: Norm Spencer; Cal Dodd; Lenore Zann; Iona Morris; Alison Sealy-Smith; George Buza; Chris Potter; Tony Daniels; Alyson Court; Catherine Disher; Cedric Smith
- Theme music composer: Ron Wasserman
- Composers: Ron Wasserman; Haim Saban (Note: Credited as 'Kussa Mahchi'.); Shuki Levy; Noam Kaniel; Amotz Plessner
- Countries of origin: United States; Canada (Note: Sources differ regarding the country or countries of origin. Some indicate that the United States is the sole country of origin, while others (e.g, FilmAffinity, Allmovie) list it as a co-production of the United States and Canada.)
- Original language: English
- No. of seasons: 5
- No. of episodes: 76 (list of episodes)

Production
- Executive producers: Winston Richard; Joseph Calamari; Stan Lee; Avi Arad
- Producers: Larry Houston; Will Meugniot; Frank Squillace; Tom McLaughlin
- Running time: 22 minutes
- Production companies: Marvel Entertainment Group; Saban Entertainment; Graz Entertainment; AKOM

Original release
- Network: Fox (Fox Kids)
- Release: October 31, 1992 – September 20, 1997

Related
- Spider-Man: The Animated Series; X-Men '97

X-Men: The Animated Series, also known as X-Men, is an animated superhero television series, based on the Marvel Comics superhero team of the same name. The series aired in the United States for five seasons from October 31, 1992, to September 20, 1997, on Fox's Fox Kids programming block. It was produced by Marvel Entertainment and Saban Entertainment, and animated principally by AKOM.

It was Marvel Comics' second attempt at an animated X-Men television series after the pilot X-Men: Pryde of the X-Men was not picked up. Set in the same fictional universe as Spider-Man: The Animated Series (1994–1998), Earth-92131, it was followed by a revival, X-Men '97, which began airing on March 20, 2024, on Disney+ to critical acclaim.

The series is currently owned and distributed by The Walt Disney Company (Marvel's parent company), which acquired all Fox Kids-related properties from News Corporation and Saban in 2001.

== Synopsis ==
The show features a team similar to that of the early 1990s X-Men comics by Jim Lee, specifically the Blue Team established early on in X-Men (vol. 2). It consists of Cyclops, Wolverine, Rogue, Storm, Beast, Gambit, Jubilee, Jean Grey, and Professor X, as well as original character Morph, who is based on Changeling. All 76 episodes were directed by Larry Houston.

The series deals with social issues, including divorce ("Proteus"), religion ("Nightcrawler" and "Bloodlines"), the Holocaust ("Enter Magneto", "Deadly Reunions", "Days of Future Past" and "The Phalanx Covenant"), AIDS hysteria ("Time Fugitives"), and loneliness ("No Mutant Is an Island"). It satirizes television in the episodes "Mojovision" and "Longshot".

It crossed over with Spider-Man: The Animated Series when Spider-Man seeks the X-Men's help to stop his progressing mutation. In the abbreviated form of the Secret Wars storyline, the Beyonder and Madame Web select Spider-Man to lead a team of heroes against a group of villains. An earlier draft of "Secret Wars" involved all the X-Men, but transporting the voice cast from Canada to Los Angeles, where production for the Spider-Man animated series was based, had been too costly in previous crossovers, so the episode was rewritten to feature only Storm, whose actress, Iona Morris, lived in Los Angeles.

In the first season, the X-Men come into conflict with human conspirators building Sentinel robots to exterminate mutants, Magneto's plan to instigate a human-mutant war, and the powerful mutant Apocalypse's attempts to bring about the end of human civilization. Other storylines include Morph's death at the hands of the Sentinels, Beast's incarceration, and Apocalypse masterminding the assassination of Senator Robert Kelly to turn humans against mutants.

In the second season, Cyclops and Jean are married and targeted by Mister Sinister, who seeks to use the genetically perfect combination of their DNA to create an army of obedient mutants. Morph returns, having been rescued by Sinister and brainwashed into forcing the X-Men apart. Over time, a rift grows between humans and mutants, with the Friends of Humanity, an anti-mutant group, leading their persecution. Apocalypse returns, developing a deadly plague that he plans to blame on mutants to fuel hatred against them. It features a parallel narrative of Professor X and Magneto being lost in the Savage Land.

The third season involves the Phoenix Force, a cosmic force that merges with Jean Grey and turns her into the Dark Phoenix. It introduces the Shi'ar Empire, which includes Lilandra Neramani and Gladiator, and seeks to stop the Dark Phoenix. Other storylines include the introduction of Wolverine's former lover turned mercenary, Lady Deathstrike, former X-Men member Iceman, and the villainous Shadow King.

Volume 5 of the Official Handbook of the Marvel Universe lists X-Men: The Animated Series as Earth-92131 in the Marvel Comics multiverse. Additionally, the plague-infested future that Bishop tries to prevent in Season 2 is listed as Earth-13393, while Cable's release of the cure is listed as Earth-121893.

== Episodes ==
Season	Episodes	Originally released	
Season	Episodes	First released	Last released
1	13	October 31, 1992	March 27, 1993
2	13	October 23, 1993	February 19, 1994
3	19	July 29, 1994	October 5, 1996
4	21	May 6, 1995	October 26, 1996
5	10	September 7, 1996	September 20, 1997

== Voice cast and characters ==
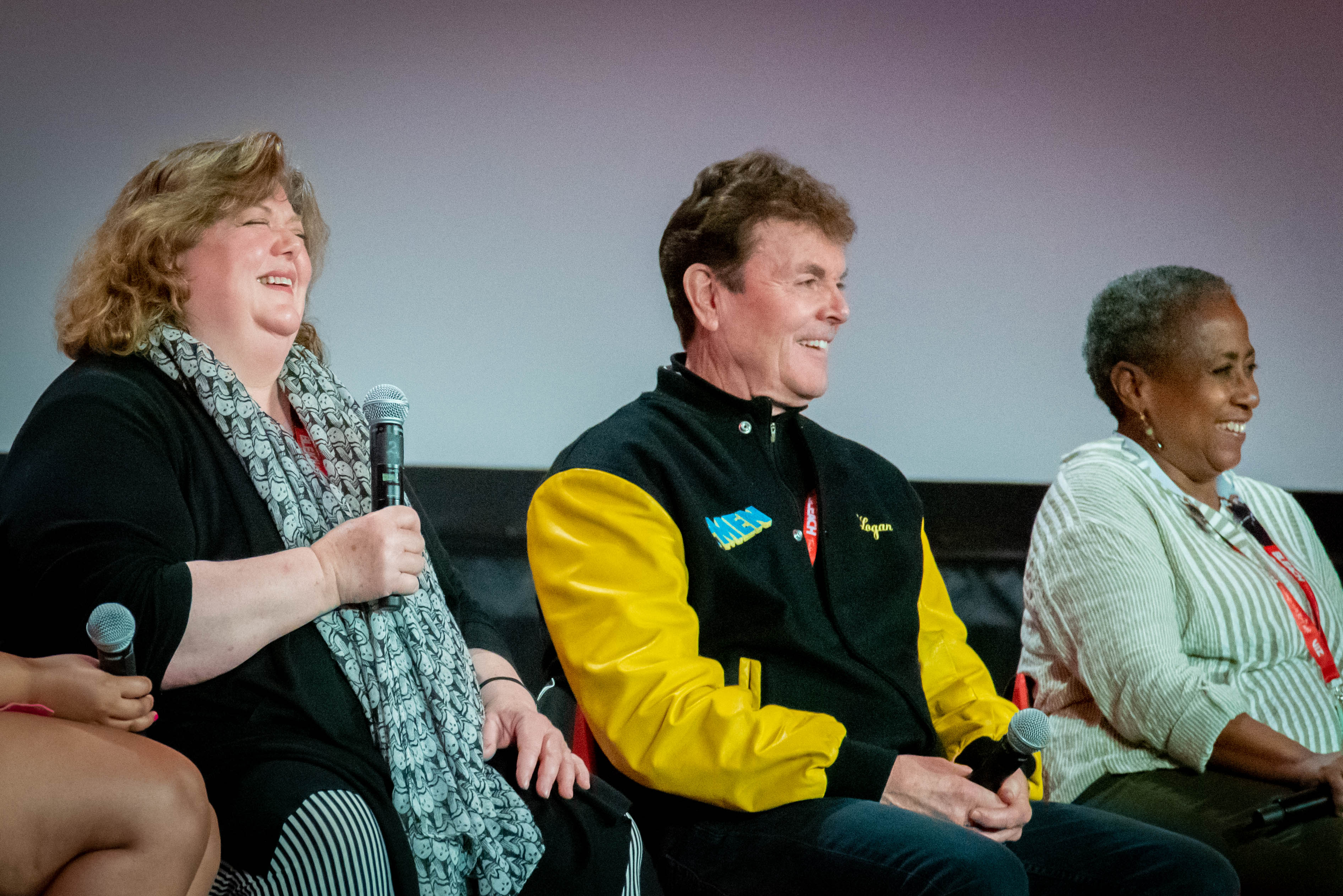
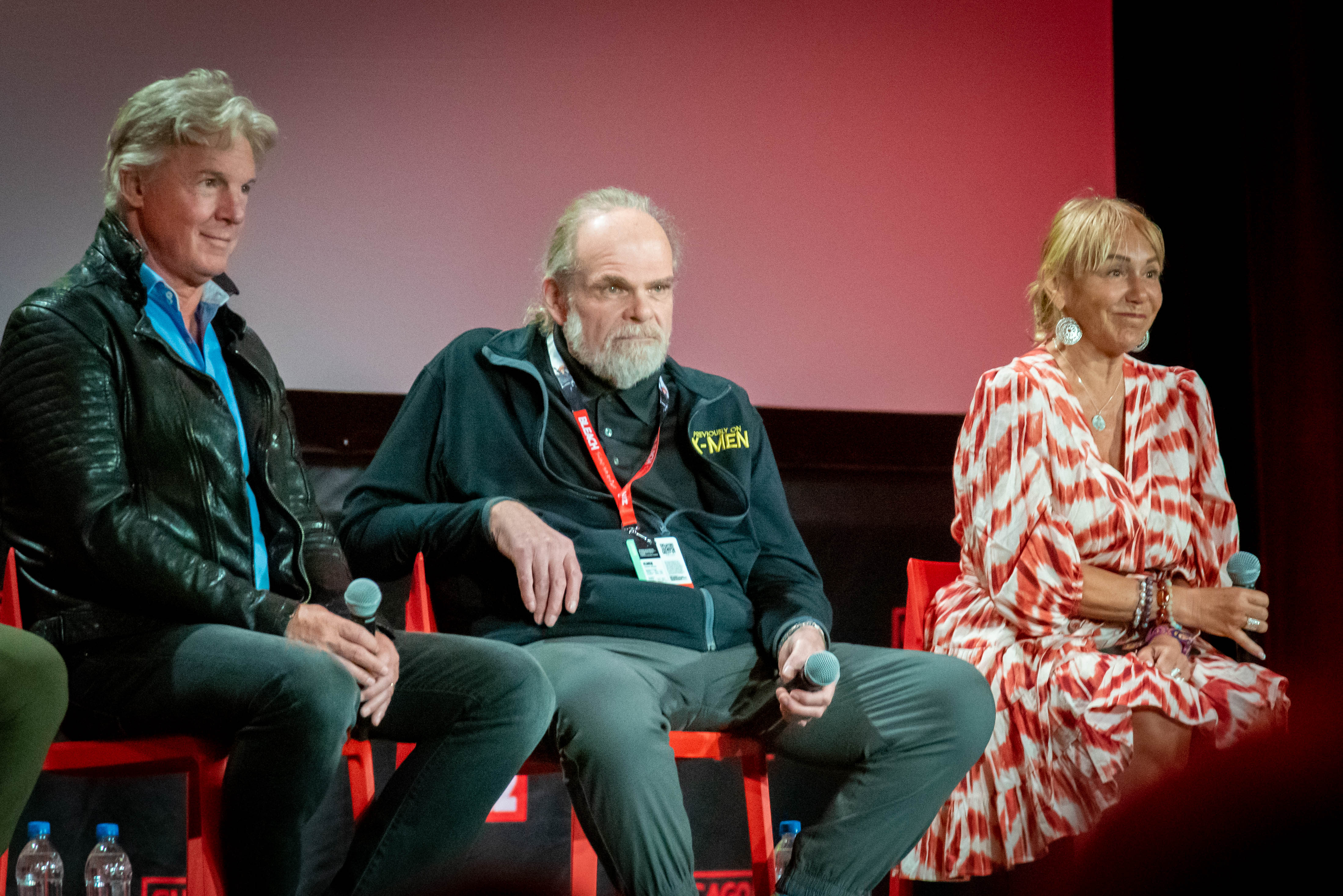
From left to right/top to bottom: Catherine Disher, Cal Dodd, Alison Sealy-Smith, Chris Potter, George Buza, and Lenore Zann

The series' voice acting was recorded in Toronto, with Dan Hennessey serving as voice director. Toronto voice actors had also been used in the 1960s Marvel Comics cartoons. Catherine Disher had originally auditioned for the part of Storm before she was cast as Jean Grey. Chris Potter was cast in the role of Gambit during filming for Kung Fu: The Legend Continues (1993-1997) which was helpful since his co-star David Carradine, a big fan of the comics, helped as he was unfamiliar. Alyson Court and Cal Dodd were neighbors when Court was a child and Dodd was a well-known actor in Canada long before voicing both Jubilee and Wolverine respectively, attributing their characters' chemistry to being previously acquainted with one another. Another voice actor originally had been cast as Jubilee, but Court was cast when the original voice was deemed too sweet and innocent for the role.

=== Principal cast ===
- George Buza: Dr. Hank McCoy / Beast, Jack the Ripper
- Alyson Court: Jubilation Lee / Jubilee
- Tony Daniels: Remy LeBeau / Gambit (1997), Bobby LeBeau, Toad, Watchdog
- Catherine Disher: Jean Grey / Marvel Girl, Madelyne Pryor
- Cal Dodd: Logan / Wolverine
- Iona Morris: Ororo Munroe / Storm (1992–1993)
- Chris Potter: Remy LeBeau / Gambit (1992–1996)
- Cedric Smith: Professor Charles Xavier / Professor X, Cerebro, Red Skull, James Xavier
- Alison Sealy-Smith: Ororo Munroe / Storm (1993–1997)
- Norm Spencer: Scott Summers / Cyclops, Caliban
- Lenore Zann: Rogue

=== Additional cast ===
- Philip Akin: Lucas Bishop
- Denis Akiyama: Sunfire (Graduation Day), Juber, Silver Samurai, Dr. Darrell Tanaka
- Harvey Atkin: Sasquatch
- Lawrence Bayne: Cable, Erik the Red, Captain America
- Cynthia Belliveau: Spiral
- Rick Bennett: Juggernaut
- Nigel Bennett: Mastermind, Master Mold ("Courage", "One Man's Worth")
- John Blackwood: Hairbag
- James Blendick: Apocalypse (1994–1995)
- Robert Bockstael: Sauron, Ka-Zar, High Evolutionary, Brainchild
- Walker Boone: Donald Pierce
- Lisa Boynton: Jandra
- Christopher Britton: Mister Sinister
- David Bryant: Sebastian Shaw
- Jason Burke: Mjnari
- Lally Cadeau: Moira MacTaggert ("The Cure", "Proteus")
- Sally Cahill: Amelia Voght ("Phalanx Covenant"), Lifemate
- Robert Cait: Colossus
- David Calderisi: Professor Thornton ("Repo Man"), Garokk
- Len Carlson: Robert Kelly, Mr. Dobson (Note: Jubilee's foster father was originally unnamed, but was given the name Martin Dobson in X-Men Adventures.), Supreme Intelligence, Marco Delgado
- Randall Carpenter: Mystique (Seasons 1–2)
- Ho Chow: Takaki
- Eugene Clark: Senator Goode
- Bill Colgate: Harry Leland
- John Colicos: Apocalypse (1993)
- Jesse Collins: Iceman
- Rod Coneybeare: Avalanche
- David Corban: Warlock
- Eve Crawford: Moira MacTaggert ("The Dark Phoenix Saga", "Courage"), Carmella Unuscione
- Amos Crawley: Rusty Collins
- Lisa Dalbello: Zaladane
- Cynthia Dale: Emma Frost
- Jennifer Dale: Callisto, Aurora, Dark Phoenix, Dazzler, Mystique ("Beyond Good and Evil")
- Diane D'Aquila: Phalanx
- Len Doncheff: Omega Red
- Shirley Douglas: X-Ternal, Bova
- Richard Eden:
- Adrian Egan: Chet Lambert, Cannonball
- Richard Epcar: Gladiator ("The Phoenix Saga")
- Barry Flatman: Henry Peter Gyrich, Vindicator
- Michael Fletcher: Professor Thornton ("Weapon X, Lies, and Video Tape"), Jebediah Creed
- Jan Filips: Alec Bohlson, Gladiator (original broadcast voice)
- Colin Fox: Zebediah Killgrave
- David Fox: Sentinels, Master Mold ("Slave Island", "The Final Decision")
- Don Francks: Sabretooth, Puck, Shaman
- Catherine Gallant: Famine
- Paul Haddad: Quicksilver, Arkon, Kiyoek
- Rex Hagon: Eluke
- Graham Haley: Pyro
- Brett Halsey: Cameron Hodge (1993)
- Roscoe Handford: Ms. Marvel
- Tom Harvey: Multiple Man
- Dan Hennessey: Bolivar Trask, Sunder, Ruckus, Abraham Cornelius, Chrome
- Ellen-Ray Hennessy:
- David Hemblen: Magneto
- Adrian Hough: Nightcrawler
- Rebecca Jenkins: Heather Hudson, Sarah ("No Mutant is an Island")
- Howard Jerome: Tusk, Gog
- Elaine Justein: Helen
- Lorne Kennedy: Solarr, Happy Sam Sawyer, Apocalypse (1997)
- Grace Kosaka: Kisara
- Gary Krawford: Cameron Hodge ("The Phalanx Covenant")
- Caroly Larson: Carly Crocker
- Shannon Lawson: Silver Fox
- Mary Long: Polaris
- Kevin Lund: Maverick
- Jane Luk: Lady Deathstrike
- Maria del Mar: Computer Cube
- Judy Marshak: Plague / Pestilence
- Sheila McCarthy: Amelia Voght ("Sanctuary")
- Rob McCowatt: Amphibius
- George Merner: Blob, Dr. Gottfried Adler
- Jim Millington: War
- Marsha Moreau: Sally Blevins
- Marc Muirhead: Cody Robbins
- Sibongile Nene: Shani
- John Neville: Major Domo
- Kristina Nicoll: Lilandra Neramani
- Jeffrey Max Nicholls: Fabian Cortez
- Raymond O'Neill: Gladiator ("The Dark Phoenix Saga", "Beyond Good and Evil")
- Stephen Ouimette: Angel / Archangel, Immortus
- Frank Perry: Araki, Django Maximoff, Master Oku
- Ross Petty: Ape
- Leon Powenall: Commander Raknar
- Ariel Pulver: Marianna
- Jeremy Ratchford:
- Fiona Reid: Moira MacTaggert ("The Phoenix Saga", "Phalanx Covenant")
- George R. Robertson: Dr. Taylor Prescott
- Susan Roman: Bella Donna
- Sandi Ross: Shard Bishop
- Ron Rubin: Morph, Leech, Raza Longknife, Ch'od
- Barbara Rudd: Hope
- Elizabeth Rukavina: Darkstar
- Stephen Russell: Trevor Fitzroy
- Camilla Scott: Deathbird
- Carolyn Scott: Scarlet Witch
- Tasha Simms: Psylocke
- John Stocker: Graydon Creed Jr.
- Stuart Stone: Tyler Dayspring, Proteus, young Charles Xavier
- Marc Strange: Forge, Kurt Marko
- Tara Strong: Illyana Rasputin
- Brian Taylor: Corsair
- Kay Tremblay: Annalee
- Maurice Dean Wint: Shadow King, D'Ken Neramani
- Peter Wildman: Mojo
- Phillip Williams: Banshee, Black Tom Cassidy
- Rod Wilson: Longshot, Gorgeous George
- Victor Young: Magneto ("Family Ties", "Beyond Good and Evil")
- Bob Zidel: Barbarus

== Production ==
In March 1990, Margaret Loesch (who had previously worked as president and chief executive officer at Marvel Productions) became head of Fox Children's Network. Having championed the Pryde of the X-Men pilot in 1989, she ordered a five-episode miniseries of X-Men in April 1990 from Marvel Productions. Due to Marvel Productions' work on other animated series (e. g. Attack of the Killer Tomatoes, Little Shop of Fox), Saban Entertainment was contracted to produce the show. Because, at the time, they lacked sufficient staff to handle in-house production, Graz Entertainment was hired to produce episodes in 1992.

In 1991, show was given working title of The Uncanny X-Men. Mark Edward Edens and Eric Lewald were to write the show, with the two dividing the job between Edens as head writer and Lewald as story editor. The voice work was done through Canadian studios, and South Korean studio AKOM was hired to animate episodes. X-Men was initially set to premiere over Labor Day weekend in September; however, due to production delays, it was delayed to the end of October. When AKOM turned in the first episode, it contained several animation errors, which they refused to fix. Because of time constraints, the episode was aired unfinished; when Fox re-aired the pilot in early 1993, the errors were corrected. The second episode was submitted just before the deadline, with 50 scenes missing and a single day reserved for editing. The two-part episode "Night of the Sentinels" originally aired as a "sneak preview" on October 31.

Because of the production delays and animation errors, Fox threatened to sever AKOM's contracts. The series earned top ratings throughout its first season, and was renewed for a second season of 13 episodes. Throughout its run, producers had to deal with quality control issues, including attempts to cut costs and requests to change the tone of the series to more child-friendly and integrated toys.

The show was originally planned to run for 65 episodes, but as a result of its success, Saban funded 11 more episodes, albeit with a reduced budget due to Marvel's bankruptcy.

The series is currently owned and distributed by The Walt Disney Company (Marvel's parent company), which acquired all Fox Kids-related properties from News Corporation and Saban International in 2001.

The series was added to streaming service Disney+ following its launch on November 12, 2019, with a revival, X-Men '97, subsequently announced to be in development. The series premiered on March 20, 2024.

== Other versions ==
The original opening sequence, used throughout the first four seasons, features the X-Men demonstrating their mutant abilities to an instrumental theme written by Ron Wasserman and composed by Haim Saban and Shuki Levy. A modified version is introduced in the fifth season. When the series was run on weekday syndication, an alternate credits sequence was used: a high-quality Japanese-animated version of the original opening. This modified version occasionally appears in the digital streaming release of the show, which was used for re-runs on UPN on Sunday mornings, and on Toon Disney.

In Italy, where the series began airing in 1994 on Canale 5, the intro and outro sequences were replaced by a new sequence and theme song: "Insuperabili X-Men", sung by Marco Destro and Pietro Ubaldi.

X-Men originally aired on TV Tokyo from 1994 to 1995. For the TV Tokyo dub of the series, the intro was replaced with a new, Japanese-animated sequence and a new theme: "Rising" by Ambience. Starting with episode 42, a second intro was used, featuring the song "Dakishimetai Dare Yori Mo" (抱きしめたい誰よりも; "I want to embrace you more than anyone else"). The end credits sequence was also changed: it featured shots of American X-Men comic books set to the song "Back to You", also by Ambience.

The TV Tokyo dub was directed by Yoshikazu Iwanami and featured scripts rewritten to include a more humorous, self-satirical tone with an emphasis on comical adlibbing, a hallmark of his dubbing style. Episodes were edited for time so that new segments could be added to the end to promote X-Men: Children of the Atom, which featured the dub actors pretending to play the game as their characters. A second dub was made in the early 2000s for broadcast on Toon Disney (Japan) that is more faithful to the original English scripts and does not cut episodes for time. This version used the original American intro and end credits rather than the unique ones created for the TV Tokyo version.

Two versions of the episode "No Mutant is an Island" exist, each with a different animation. The first version was aired for Toon Disney reruns, can be seen on digital streaming services such as Amazon Prime Video and Disney+, aired on Fox Kids in the United States, and uses the remixed intro theme from Season 5. The second version is available on Region 1 DVD, aired on overseas Fox Kids channels, and uses the default intro theme from Seasons 1–4.

== Viewership ==
In its prime, X-Men garnered very high ratings for a Saturday morning cartoon and received praise for adapting many different storylines from the comics. Haim Saban credits the success of the series in assisting him to sell his next project to Fox: Mighty Morphin Power Rangers.

X-Men reached a viewership of over 23 million households.

== Legacy ==
=== X-Men '97 ===
By 2019, there were ongoing talks with Disney+ to revive the series. In November 2021, it was revealed that a revival titled X-Men '97 was in development which will continue the plot of the series. X-Men '97 eventually premiered on March 20, 2024. Beau DeMayo served as head writer for the first two seasons, with most of the surviving cast members of the original series reprising their roles, including Dodd, Zann, Buza, Disher, Potter, Sealy-Smith, Hough, and Britton. They were joined by Jennifer Hale, Ray Chase, Matthew Waterson, JP Karliak, Holly Chou, Jeff Bennett, and A.J. LoCascio. Alyson Court did not reprise her role as Jubilee, requesting that Jubilee be voiced by an Asian actress. She instead returned to voice an alternate version of the character named Abscissa. The series is produced by Marvel Studios Animation, but does not take place within the Marvel Cinematic Universe.

=== Comics ===
==== X-Men Adventures ====
X-Men Adventures
- X-Men Adventures vol. 1 #1 (Nov. 1992). Art by Steve Lightle.

Publication information
- Publisher: Marvel Comics
- Schedule: Monthly
- Format: Ongoing
- Publication date: November 1992 – March 1997
- No. of issues: 53
- Main character: X-Men

X-Men Adventures was a comic book spin-off of the animated series. Beginning in November 1992, it adapted the first three seasons of the show; in April 1996, it became Adventures of the X-Men, which contained original stories set within the same continuity. The comic book lasted until March 1997, shortly after the show's cancellation by the Fox Network.

Bibliography

- X-Men Adventures vol. 1 (1992–94) (15 issues)
- X-Men Adventures vol. 2 (1994–95) (13 issues)
- X-Men Adventures vol. 3 (1995–96) (13 issues)
- Adventures of the X-Men (1996–97) (12 issues)

Additionally, stories featuring the same characters were printed through the 19 issues of Spider-Man Magazine, published between March 1994 and March 1997, alongside stories inspired by the animated series Spider-Man.

==== X-Men '92 ====
The comic book series X-Men '92 was first released as one of the many tie-in titles for Marvel's 2015 Secret Wars event, and continued in its second volume as a regular series in early 2016, starring characters of the TV show's reality.

In January 2022, Marvel announced a new series inspired by the cartoon, X-Men '92: House of XCII. Published in April of that same year, the series explores an alternate universe where the events of Jonathan Hickman's House of X and Powers of X happened decades earlier, in the '90s of the original show.

=== Books ===
==== Previously on X-Men ====
In 2017, series developer and showrunner Eric Lewald released the book Previously on X-Men: The Making of an Animated Series, which features his interviews with 36 of the staff and voice cast behind the TV series, as well as Lewald's personal experiences on the series' development and production.

==== X-Men: The Art and Making of The Animated Series ====
In 2020, Eric Lewald and Julia Lewald released the book X-Men: The Art and Making of The Animated Series, which features previously unseen concept art, storyboards, character models, background layouts, animation cels, and other production/promotional materials, along with new interviews with the series principal artists and production staff.

=== Video games ===
- X-Men Cartoon Maker: a recreational software package that allows the user to create limited animations from a library of backdrops, animations, and sound effects from the show. Wolverine and Storm appear as tutors.
- Capcom's VS. Series: the characters in the series were licensed by Capcom and were the inspiration for the video game X-Men: Children of the Atom, which in turn would be the basis for the Marvel vs. Capcom sub-series of video games. Most of the voice actors who did the voices in the series reprised their roles for the video game. Capcom would continue to use these characters long after the show was canceled, before eventually losing the rights to create Marvel-based games to Electronic Arts in 2001. Capcom, however, would reacquire the rights in 2008 and released Marvel vs. Capcom 3: Fate of Two Worlds / Ultimate Marvel vs. Capcom 3 in 2011.

=== In film ===
The series was credited for being responsible for the beginning development of the 2000 X-Men film. Fox Kids owner 20th Century Fox was impressed by the success of the TV show, and producer Lauren Shuler Donner purchased the film rights for them in 1994. The film's success led to a film franchise, which includes a series of sequels, prequels, and spin-offs, for two decades up to 2020, when the series came to an end due to Disney's acquisition of Fox, with the character rights reverting to Marvel Studios. Potter revealed that he once auditioned for the role of Cyclops in the 2000 film before losing it to James Marsden, while Buza would appear in the film proper as a truck driver.

In the 2022 Marvel Cinematic Universe film Doctor Strange in the Multiverse of Madness, produced by Marvel Studios, the theme song from the TV series (orchestrated by Danny Elfman and credited as X-Men '97 Theme) is played when Charles Xavier (portrayed by Patrick Stewart) first appears; in the film, unlike his previous performances as the character in Fox's X-Men franchise, Stewart's Xavier is visually redesigned to match his animated counterpart, complete with his iconic green suit, blue and black tie, and yellow hoverchair.

=== In television ===
In the Ms. Marvel episode "No Normal", set in the MCU, the theme song from the X-Men animated series is played when Kamala Khan discovers that she is a "mutant".

== Lawsuit ==
On October 9, 2019, Hungarian immigrant Zoltán Krisko, manager of the estate of György Vukán, filed a lawsuit against Marvel Entertainment, Warner Chappell Music, Haim Saban, Shuki Levy, Ron Wasserman, UMG Recordings (the current distributor of Disney Music Group) and Fox Corporation. He claims the theme music was plagiarized from the theme song to the 1984–1991 Hungarian action-adventure television series Linda, which was composed by Vukán. The case was dismissed on January 9, 2021.

== Sources ==
- Lewald, Eric; Lewald, Julia (2020). X-Men: The Art and Making of The Animated Series. Abrams Books. ISBN 978-1419744686.
