= Yunjin (disambiguation) =

Yunjin is a traditional Chinese luxury silk brocade.

Yunjin may also refer to:

- Yun Jin, a fictional character in the game Genshin Impact
- Yang Kaihui (1901–1930), the second wife of Mao Zedong, whose courtesy name was Yunjin
- Yunjin Kim (born 1973), a South Korean and American actress
- Huh Yunjin (born 2001), a member of the South Korean girl group Le Sserafim
