= Melinoë =

Ancient Greek chthonic goddess

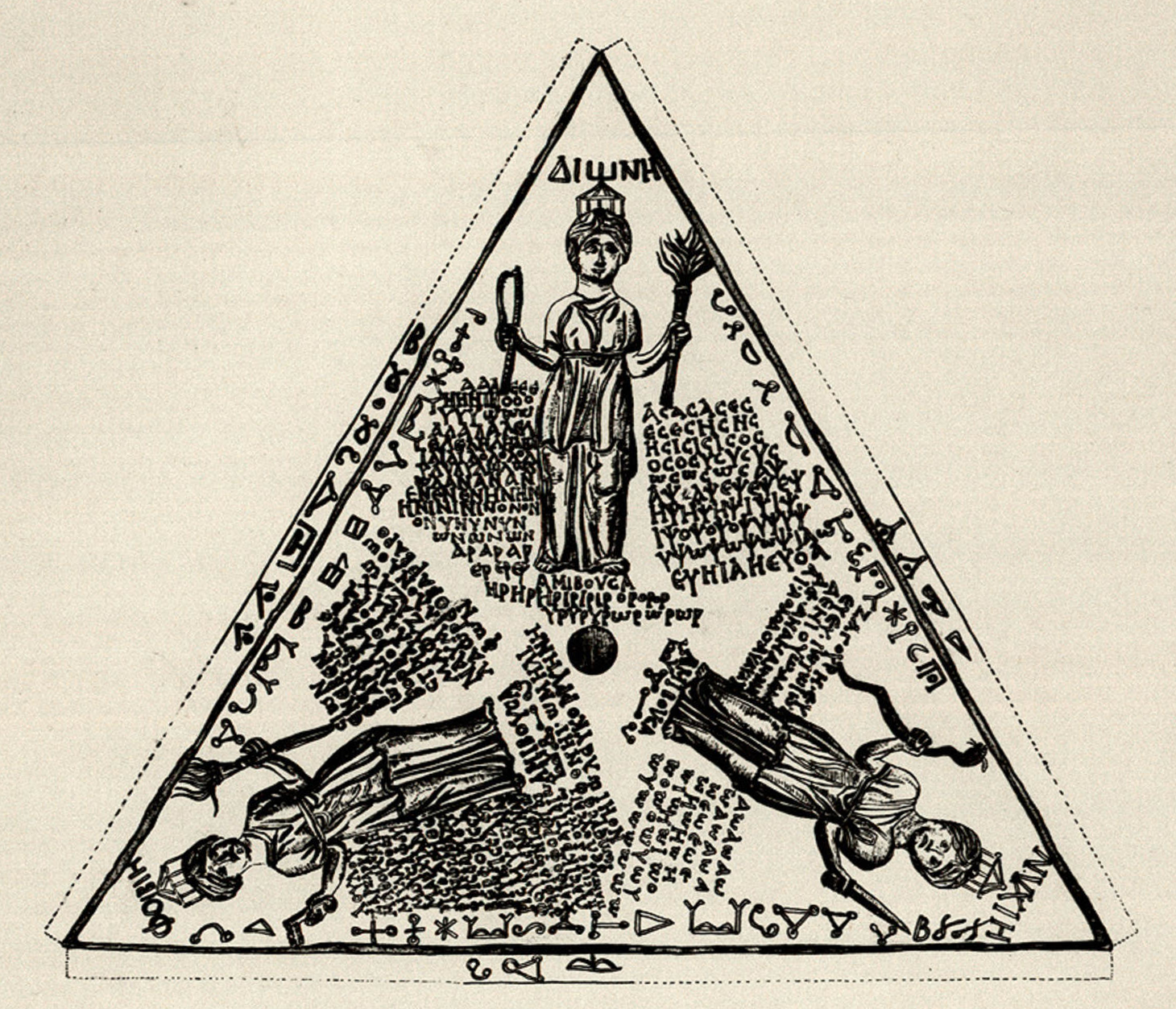
Bronze tablet (3rd century AD) from Pergamon invoking Melinoë along with Persephone and Leucophryne; the three goddesses pictured are labeled as Dione, Phoebe, and Nyche

Melinoë (/mɪˈlɪnoʊiː/; Ancient Greek: Μηλινόη, romanized: Mēlinóē, pronounced [mɛːlinóɛː]) is a chthonic goddess invoked in one of the Orphic Hymns (2nd or 3rd centuries AD?), and represented as a bringer of nightmares and madness. In the hymn, Melinoë has characteristics that seem similar to Hecate and the Erinyes, and Melinoë's name is sometimes thought to be an epithet of Hecate. The name "Melinoë" also appears on a metal tablet in association with Persephone.

== Name ==
Melinoë may derive from Greek mḗlinos (μήλινος), "having the colour of quince", from mêlon (μῆλον), "tree fruit". The fruit's yellowish-green colour evoked the pallor of illness or death for the Greeks.

== Orphic Hymn ==
Orphic Hymn 71 is addressed to Melinoë, and describes her as follows (in the translation by Apostolos Athanassakis and Benjamin M. Wolkow):

I call upon Melinoë, saffron-cloaked nymph of the earth,
whom revered Persephone bore by the mouth of the Kokytos river
upon the sacred bed of Kronian Zeus.
In the guise of Plouton Zeus tricked Persephone and through wiley plots bedded her;
a two-bodied specter sprang forth from Persephone's fury.
This specter drives mortals to madness with her airy apparitions
as she appears in weird shapes and strange forms,
now plain to the eye, now shadowy, now shining in the darkness—
all this in unnerving attacks in the gloom of night.
O goddess, O queen of those below, I beseech you
to banish the soul's frenzy to the ends of the earth,
show to the initiates a kindly and holy face.

== Birth ==
Melinoë is the daughter of Persephone and was fathered by Zeus, who tricked her via "wily plots" by taking the form of Hades. This indicates that, in the hymn, Persephone is already married to Hades. This is paralleled with another Orphic myth, the birth of Dionysus, who was conceived when Zeus, disguised as a serpent, deceived and mated with Persephone. Melinoë is born at the mouth of the Cocytus, one of the rivers of the underworld, where the Chthonic Hermes is stationed in his role as psychopomp. In the Orphic tradition, the Cocytus is one of four underworld rivers.

Although some Greek myths deal with themes of incest, in Orphic genealogies lines of kinship express theological and cosmogonical concepts, not the realities of human family relations. The ancient Greek nymphē in the first line can mean "nymph", but also "bride" or "young woman". Thus Melinoë is described as such not in order to be designated as a divinity of lower status, but rather as a young woman of marriageable age; the same word is applied to Hecate and Tethys (a Titaness) in their own Orphic hymns. As an underworld "queen" (Basileia, Βασιλεία), Melinoë is at least partially syncretized with Persephone herself.

== Attributes and functions ==
Melinoë is described in the invocation of the Orphic Hymn as κροκόπεπλος (krokópeplos), "clad in saffron" (see peplos), an epithet also used for Eos, the personification of dawn. In the hymns, only two goddesses are described as krokopeplos, Melinoë and Hecate.

Melinoë's connections to Hecate and Hermes suggest that she exercised her power in the realm of the soul's passage, and in that function may be compared to the torchbearer Eubuleus in the mysteries. According to the hymn about her, Melinoë brings night terrors to mortals by manifesting in strange forms, "now plain to the eye, now shadowy, now shining in the darkness", and can drive mortals insane.

== Inscriptions ==
Melinoë appears on a bronze tablet for use in the kind of private ritual usually known as "magic". The style of Greek letters on the tablet, which was discovered at Pergamon, dates it to the first half of the 3rd century AD. The use of bronze was probably intended to drive away malevolent spirits and to protect the practitioner. The construction of the tablet suggests that it was used for divination. It is triangular in shape, with a hole in the center, presumably for suspending it over a surface.

The content of the triangular tablet reiterates triplicity. It depicts three crowned goddesses, each with her head pointing at an angle and her feet pointing toward the center. The name of the goddess appears above her head: Dione (ΔΙⲰΝΗ), Phoebe (ΦΟΙΒΙΗ), and the obscure Nyche (ΝΥΧΙΗ). Amibousa, a word referring to the phases of the moon, is written under each goddess's feet. Densely inscribed spells frame each goddess: the inscriptions around Dione and Nyche are voces magicae, incantatory syllables ("magic words") that are mostly untranslatable. Melinoë appears in a triple invocation that is part of the inscription around Phoebe: O Persephone, O Melinoë, O Leucophryne. Esoteric symbols are inscribed on the edges of the triangle.

== In popular culture ==
Melinoë is the protagonist of the video game Hades II, developed and published by Supergiant Games. In the game, Melinoë is the Princess of the Underworld and sister of Zagreus, the protagonist of the first game. She seeks to defeat Chronos with help from Hecate, the Olympian gods, and other figures from Greek mythology, such as Odysseus.
