= Music of Genshin Impact =

Music from the video game Genshin Impact

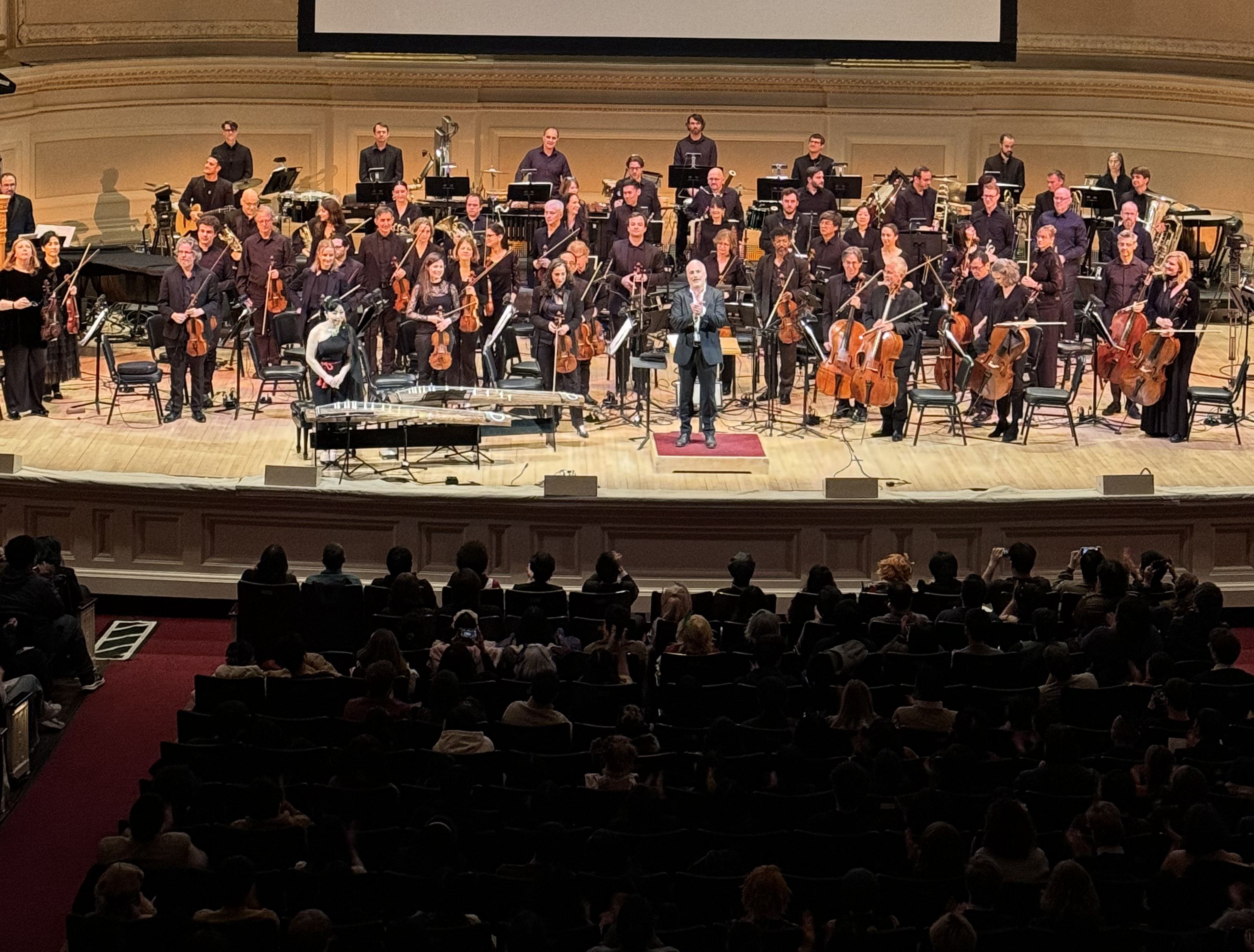
A 2024 concert of music from Genshin Impact at Carnegie Hall

Since 2020, HOYO-MiX, the in-house music studio of the video game developer company miHoYo, has been releasing music soundtracks for in-game Genshin Impact. The soundtracks have been primarily composed by Yu-Peng Chen, with orchestration from notable orchestras including the London Philharmonic Orchestra and the Shanghai Symphony Orchestra. The music has received generally positive reviews from gaming outlets and academics, and has won several awards including a nomination for the PlayStation Game Music Award in 2021.

== Mondstadt ==
In 2019, video game developer company miHoYo got composer and music producer Yu-Peng Chen, also known as Chen Zhiyi, to produce the soundtrack for their title Genshin Impact with their in-house music studio HOYO-MiX. It was Chen's first major video game work, and he described the project as a difficult challenge. The game has an open-world environment that features areas referred to as regions, with visual designs inspired by different world cultures. In composing the music for these regions, Chen chose a style that integrates elements of traditional folk music with Western musical arrangements. During the pre-release development stage, the game only featured Mondstadt and Liyue, two of the planned seven regions. On top of idyllic rural scenery, medieval European architectural styles and cultures inspired the design of Mondstadt. In composing the music for Mondstadt, Chen borrowed the language and rhythm of Impressionism and used the piano, tin whistle instruments, and medieval-style lutes. In composing the combat music, he used various composition techniques such as polyphony and taking orchestration elements from composers such as Ludwig van Beethoven.

The Mondstadt soundtrack was performed by the London Philharmonic Orchestra with Robert Ziegler as the conductor, and Nick Wollage and Laurence Anslow as music engineers. The coordination with the orchestra was done by Lei Cine Music Management (擂闪音乐事务所), with preliminary communication taking place five months before the recording. The recording sessions took place at AIR Studios. Zhang Lei (张磊), the founder of Lei Cine Music Management, joined Chen Yupeng and Hoyo-Mix director Zoe Cai (Chinese: 蔡近翰, romanized: Cài Jìnhàn) for the recording in London. At AIR Studios, Chen had conducted the "Genshin Impact Main Theme" himself.

The Wind and The Star Traveler

Soundtrack album by HOYO-MiX
- Released: June 19, 2020
- Recorded: September 2019
- Venue: Lyndhurst Hall
- Studio: AIR Studios
- Length: 28:50
- Label: Hoyo-Mix
- Producer: Chen Yupeng

HOYO-MiX chronology
A Post-Honkai Odyssey (2020)	The Wind and The Star Traveler (2020)	Review (2020)

=== The Wind and The Star Traveler ===
The first original soundtrack album to be produced for Genshin Impact was The Wind and The Star Traveler (风与异乡人), which got released on June 19, 2020. All fifteen soundtracks in the album were composed by Chen Yupeng. The next soundtrack album, City of Winds and Idylls (风与牧歌之城), is dedicated to the Mondstadt Chapter and commemorates the release of Genshin Impact. The album was released on digital music platforms on September 28, 2020. Two tracks, "Whirl of Boreal Wind" and "Symphony of Boreal Wind", were performed by the Shanghai Symphony Orchestra.

Vortex of Legends (漩涡、落星与冰山), the fifth Genshin Impact soundtrack album, was released on April 2, 2021. It featured a total of 17 tracks composed by Chen Yupeng of Hoyo-Mix, each one an original composition for the Dragonspine area.

== Liyue ==
For Liyue, which had scenic Eastern fantasy as its basis, Chen used elements of Chinese folk music—traditional instruments, the pentatonic scale, and melodies—with Western romantic harmonies and orchestral arrangements. The Liyue soundtrack got performed by the Shanghai Symphony Orchestra at the Shanghai Symphony Hall (上海交响乐团音乐厅), with Zhang Jiemin (张洁敏) as the conductor. An Dong (安栋), one of Chen's mentors from the Shanghai Conservatory of Music, served as a music supervisor during the scoring sessions of the soundtrack. Lu Xiaoxing (陆晓幸), noted as a co-awardee at the 44th Annual Grammy Awards for the soundtrack of Crouching Tiger, Hidden Dragon (2000), served as the recording director and consultant. The recording of the Liyue soundtrack took five days.

Jade Moon Upon a Sea of Clouds (皎月云间之梦), the third Genshin Impact soundtrack album to be produced, is dedicated to the Liyue Chapter. It featured a total of 69 tracks all composed by Chen.

The next soundtrack album for Liyue, Millelith's Watch (千岩旷望), got released on June 22, 2022. It featured a total of forty tracks dedicated to The Chasm area. The album saw guest musician Li Haitao (李海涛) on the Morin Khuur. Li was known for performing the instrument on the streets of Shanghai, and had gained significant attention and following online for doing so since 2016.

The track "Rapid as Wildfire" was played during the coverage of a Berita RTM Lunar New Year broadcast in 2021.

== Inazuma ==
Realm of Tranquil Eternity

Soundtrack album by HOYO-MiX
- Released: September 27, 2021
- Studio: List: Heartbeat Recording Studio; Jintian Recording Studio; Onkio Haus; Shanghai Media Group; Shangri-la Studio; Sony Music Studio; SoundCity; Tokyo Opera City Concert Hall
- Length: 1:51:03
- Label: HOYO-MiX
- Producer: Sony Music Entertainment Japan

HOYO-MiX chronology
The Shimmering Voyage (2021)	Realm of Tranquil Eternity (2021)	Oracle (2021)

=== Realm of Tranquil Eternity ===
Like the soundtrack for the Liyue region, the music of Inazuma also took on the fusion of traditional or folk musical elements with Western orchestration. Much of the compositions took from historic Japanese melodies. One instance is "Sakura Sakura", which was adapted for the theme of the Electro Archon. After learning about the popularity of previous combat music with players, Chen chose to compose four combat themes for Inazuma, opposed to the Mondstadt and Liyue regions only having three combat themes each. He also adopted the rhythmic style of modern electronic music in composing the music. The Inazuma soundtrack was performed by the Tokyo Philharmonic Orchestra, with Hirofumi Kurita (栗田 博文, Kurita Hirofumi) as the conductor and Sachiko Miyano (宮野 幸子, Miyano Sachiko) of Shangri-La Inc. as the scoring sessions director. The sound recording was done at multiple studios in China and Japan, and the mixing and mastering was done by music engineers Simon Rhodes and Simon Gibson of Abbey Road Studios in London. The recording process took around one and half months; the production for four months in total with preliminary communication accounted for.

Realm of Tranquil Eternity (寂远无妄之国), the seventh soundtrack album to be produced for Genshin Impact and dedicated to the Inazuma Chapter, was released on September 22, 2021.

=== Islands of the Lost and Forgotten ===
The second soundtrack album dedicated to the Inazuma Chapter, Islands of the Lost and Forgotten (佚落迁忘之岛), and the tenth album to be released for Genshin Impact, got released on April 13, 2022. Its track listing was first announced on April 7. The album featured a total of 60 tracks for the Watatsumi Island, Seirai Island, Tsurumi Island areas and the Enkanomiya region; the music was composed by Chen, Yuan Dimeng, Ding Qian, Jiang Yijun, and Zhao Xin. It was a co-production between Hoyo-Mix and Sony Music Entertainment Japan.

== Sumeru ==
Forest of Jnana and Vidya

Soundtrack album by Hoyo-Mix
- Released: October 20, 2022
- Studio: List: 52 Hz Studio; Abbey Road Studios; Air-Edel Recording Studios; Budapest Scoring; Jintian Recording Studio; Redfort Studio; Smecky Studio; Sound Pro Studio; St Luke's
- Length: 3:21:24
- Label: HOYO-MiX
- Producer: miHoYo

Hoyo-Mix chronology
Footprints of the Traveler (2022)	Forest of Jnana and Vidya (2022)	Cheer Up (2022)

=== Forest of Jnana and Vidya ===
The music of Sumeru took inspiration from various cultures and regions of the Middle East, North Africa, and South Asia. For the rainforest area inspired by South Asia, the music featured traditional instruments including the bansuri performed by Eliza Marshall, the sitar performed by Jonathan Mayer and Arjun Verma, and the tabla performed by Kuljit Bhamra, among others. Chen incorporated elements of Indian classical music and yoga music into their work to give the music "a feeling of contemporary wisdom and spirituality". Composer Yu-Peng Chen also took reference from symphonic suites by Russian classical composer Nikolai Rimsky-Korsakov and orchestration elements from Rimsky-Korsakov's "Scheherazade". The London Symphony Orchestra, along with conductor Robert Ziegler returning from the Mondstadt soundtrack, performed the majority of the music. The orchestra recording was done at Abbey Road Studios in London. Other guest folk musicians included Baha Yetkin, Attab, and Kian on the oud, Steve Smith on the bouzouki and mandolin, Maya Youssef on the kanun, and Peyman on the santur. Mixing engineer Simon Gibson of Abbey Road Studios returned from the Liyue music production to work on the Sumeru soundtrack.

Forest of Jnana and Vidya (智妙明论之林), the fourteenth Genshin Impact soundtrack album to be produced, is dedicated to the Sumeru Chapter. The track listing was officially announced on October 18, 2022, and the album was released on October 20. It featured a total of 100 tracks composed by Chen, Yuan Dimeng, Ding Qian, Jiang Yijun, and Zhao Xin. Aside from the London Symphony Orchestra, other participating orchestra groups included the Budapest Scoring Orchestra, International Master Philharmonic Orchestra (国际首席爱乐乐团), and The City of Prague Philharmonic Orchestra. Other participating musicians included Gu Jiannan (顾剑楠) on the bansuri, Ashley Blasse and Fan Ye (范晔) on the classical guitar, and Stephanie Gonley and Ming Liu (柳鸣) on the violin.

=== The Unfathomable Sand Dunes ===
The Unfathomable Sand Dunes is the sixteenth album of the Genshin Impact music. The album was first announced on March 31, 2023, and its tracklist was announced the day before the album's release.

The desert area which was inspired by the Middle East the traditional instruments featured included the ney performed by John Plotner, the duduk performed by Martin Robertson, and the saz performed by Dursun Can Çakin. Kuljit Bhamra of Red Fort Studios took on the role of supervisor for the folk instrumental performances.

== Fontaine ==
The environmental music of Fontaine was performed by the London Symphony Orchestra in collaboration with folk artists, complementing Fontaine's overall European aesthetic. When creating the region's soundtrack, Genshin Impact's music team, Hoyo-Mix, drew inspiration from a variety of European musical traditions and instruments including the lute, including styles that emerged in Germany and Austria from the Renaissance through the Romantic era, as well as the works of French composers like Camille Saint-Saëns, Gabriel Fauré, and Maurice Ravel. The orchestration featured classic European instruments such as the lute, mandolin, and viol, while combat themes incorporated the glass harmonica to distinguish Fontaine's music from that of Mondstadt, which has a medieval tone.

According to one of the game's music producers, Fontaine's environments can be divided into two distinct musical settings: one for above-water situations and one for underwater, each with its own style. For above-water areas, the soundtrack mainly uses traditional European instruments, incorporating elements of jazz, waltz and Baroque music to evoke Fontaine's sense of romance. In contrast, the underwater music emphasizes electronic sounds and vocal chants, creating an atmosphere that is light and peaceful, helping to prevent players from feeling claustrophobic during underwater exploration. Fontaine's main theme uses a sonata form to convey narrative structure, with an expanded development section to enhance storytelling, and also employs montage techniques to reinforce its narrative flow.

== Other soundtracks ==
=== Natlan ===
Natlan's soundtrack reflects the region's diverse cultural inspirations. HOYO-MiX blended Latin American and African musical elements, with teaser tracks featuring classical Spanish guitar strumming, castanet rhythms, and lyrics sung in Swahili. The Vienna University Philharmonic chorus sung the chants and chorus.

=== Nod-Krai ===
Nod-Krai's soundtrack takes inspiration from Celtic and Nordic music. It was released on October 16, 2025.

=== The Stellar Moments series ===
The Stellar Moments Vol. 1 was released in February 2021 and covers tracks for playable characters from Mondstadt and Liyue. The Stellar Moments Vol. 2 was released in January 2022 and covers tracks for playable characters from Liyue and Inazuma. The Stellar Moments Vol. 3 was released in October 2023 and covers tracks for playable characters from Inazuma and Sumeru. The Stellar Moments Vol. 4 was released in January 2024 and covers tracks for playable characters from Sumeru and Fontaine. The Stellar Moments Vol. 5 was released in January 2025 and covers tracks for playable characters from Fontaine and Natlan. The Stellar Moments Vol. 6 was released on January 21, 2026, and covers tracks for playable characters from Natlan and Nod-Krai.

=== The Shimmering Voyage series ===
The Shimmering Voyage series is a set of albums consisting of music featured in story quests, battles, world boss fights, and locations as well as other miscellaneous music for Genshin Impact. Volume 1 was released on July 19, 2021, volume 2 on August 15, 2022, volume 3 on July 26, 2023, volume 4 on July 31, 2024, and volume 5 on August 13, 2025.

=== Footprints of the Traveler series ===
The Footprints of the Traveler album series covers the Version Soundtracks found in the various Version trailers. Volume 1 was released on September 20, 2022, volume 2 on June 30, 2023, volume 3 on August 9, 2024, and volume 4 on July 25, 2025.

== EPs and singles ==
"Fleeting Colors in Flight"

Soundtrack album by HOYO-MiX
- Released: January 15, 2022
- Venue: Shanghai Jingju Theater Company
- Studio: Shanghai Media Group
- Length: 9:29
- Label: HOYO-MiX
- Producer: Chen Yupeng

HOYO-MiX chronology
Devastation and Redemption (2022)	"Fleeting Colors in Flight" (2022)	Regression (2022)

=== "Fleeting Colors in Flight" ===
"Fleeting Colors in Flight" is the eighth soundtrack and first EP album produced by HOYO-MiX and released in 2022 for the video game Genshin Impact.

The album was performed by Yu-Peng Chen as composer and Dimeng Yuan as arranger and produced in Shanghai Media Group. The first track single Devastation and Redemption was released on January 15, 2022. Yun Jin performed this musical piece in the style of Chinese opera. The vocals of Yun Jin's voice actor Yang Yang were performed in Shanghai Jingju Theater Company. Later, the Myriad of Lights and instrumental version of Devastation and Redemption were released on January 31, 2022. All three soundtracks in the album were composed by HOYO-MiX and were dedicated to the version 2.4 soundtrack release of Genshin Impact.

=== "Passing Memories" ===
The album "Passing Memories" was released on September 28, 2024, for the fourth anniversary of Genshin Impact. The vocals were performed by Japanese singer Mika Nakashima, with an accompanying music video, set to a backing track consisting of mid-tempo piano, guitar, bass, drums, and strings.

== Musicology and instrumentation ==
=== "Main Theme" ===
The title theme of Genshin Impact uses an Irish whistle motif, first heard in the four bar alto introduction which concludes with a major chord and is then heard again during an eight bar. This verse includes a polyrhythmic bassoon, clarinet, horn and oboe. The theme results in a ternary chronology. Chen aimed to have players be immersed with the introductory "beautiful melodies", setting the tone for the rest of the game.

=== "Rage Beneath the Mountains" ===
Released as part of "The Shimmering Voyage" album on July 19, 2021, the track is played during the battle against the ancient dragon Azhdaha within the game. "Rage Beneath the Mountains" uses lyricism inspired by Chu Ci, an ancient Chinese literary form. The track juxtaposes tradition Chinese orchestration with modern rock music, including the implementation of a modified erhu. The track featured as the sixth day drum rhythm challenge during the Arataki Drumalong Festival in 2023. In version 5.3, a feature called "Repertoire of Myriad Melodies" was permanently added to the game, allowing players to perform tracks using instruments, resembling rhythm games. This went live on January 1, 2025.

=== Motifs ===
The main factions in Genshin Impact, such as Fatui as well as some core characters throughout the story, also have their own music motives, which are used in promotional videos, when characters appear in the story, and in boss battles. When players hear these motives, they can associate them with the corresponding factions and characters.

== Reception ==
Kotaku writer Sisi Jiang praised The Wind and the Star Traveler's compositional ability to complement the protagonist's character development, explaining that when she listens to it "I think of how the protagonist started out insignificant...only to shape their legend through perilous circumstances." Jiang further praised the darker notes of Symphony of the Boreal Wind, with its choir and ticking clock conveying "the feeling of alienation". Lewis White of VideoGamer highlighted composer Bear McCreary's enjoyment of the Genshin soundtrack, who explained that whilst playing the game during the COVID-19 lockdown, he described the world of Genshin as a "blank canvas", which a "live orchestra" encouraging the player to want to "walk around." Florence Lockheart referred to the Genshin Impact soundtrack as a "phenomenon", whilst describing a new initiative called Impact4Music. Screen Rant writer Austin King acknowledged composer Chen Yupeng as one of the main reasons behind Genshin's success, comparing the music to the soundtracks of Dragon Quest and older Final Fantasy titles.

A research article by academics from the University of Shanghai for Science and Technology focusing on Genshin Impact as the ninth art, cited the music from Inazuma and Sumeru as being able to "enhance the sense of immersion", allowing non-Chinese players in particular to feel "intimacy and resonance". Sebastian Ruppert of Gameswelt attributed the diversity of the soundtrack to the demanding job of the orchestra, highlighting how the different regions of Teyvat require instrumentation that reflects the respective culture of each area.

== Awards and nominations ==
Year	Recipient	Award	Result	Ref.
2020	Genshin Impact	BIGC Award for Excellent Game Music of the Year	Won	
2020	Genshin Impact	GIAC Award for Excellent Game Music	Won	
2021	Genshin Impact	PlayStation Game Music Award	Nominated	
2021	Jade Moon Upon a Sea of Clouds	CMIC Music Award for Best Score Soundtrack for Video Game	Won	
2022	Genshin Impact	GIAC Award for Excellent Game Music Design	Nominated	
2023	The Shimmering Voyage Vol. 2	TMEA Award for Best Game Music Album	Won	
2023	Genshin Impact	GIAC Award for Excellent Game Music Design	Nominated	
2024	Genshin Impact – Fountain of Belleau	PlayStation Game Music Awards Spotify Streaming category	Nominated	
