= Trish Tilby =

Marvel Comics character

Publication information
- Publisher: Marvel Comics
- First appearance: X-Factor #7 (August 1986)
- Created by: Louise Simonson; Jackson Guice

In-story information
- Alter ego: Patricia Tilby

Patricia "Trish" Tilby is a fictional character appearing in American comic books published by Marvel Comics. The character first appeared in X-Factor vol. 1 #7 (August 1986).

She is a news reporter who is associated with X-Factor, and has had a relationship with Beast.

== Fictional character biography ==
Trish Tilby is a television news reporter, and predominantly seen working for CBNC. She is the on-again/off-again ally of the X-Men.

Tilby investigates X-Factor when the team is pretending to be mutant hunters to find persecuted mutants. With aide from Mystique, she reveals that Angel had been backing the team.

Tilby reports on the X-Men's battle with the villain Apocalypse. Around then, she meets Hank McCoy, also known as Beast. They soon begin what would be a rocky relationship. They share their first kiss after the return of Hank's mutated blue-furred form.

During the time that Beast is part of X-Factor, Tilby works for W-ARC TV alongside her ex-husband Paul Burton. This causes tension with Beast who becomes depressed after misinterpreting a friendly kiss shared between Tilby and Burton. Tilby and Beast's relationship becomes further strained when she tells the world of the Legacy Virus, a deadly virus that originally only affected mutants, but has evolved to affect humans as well. They have an intense argument in Tilby's workplace, in which she blames Hank for not curing the virus fast enough. Hank dumps her over this situation, but they end up getting back together after they are both kidnapped by Dark Beast, an evil alternate universe version of Beast.

A beating by Vargas and a power-adjustment by Sage leads to Beast gaining a feline appearance before Cassandra Nova (impersonating Professor X) exposes the X-Men to the world and Tilby's relationship with Hank comes to light. A news article uses the word 'bestiality' to refer to their relationship, causing Tilby to break up with Hank right before their date.

Tilby is invited with dozens of other media representatives after the X-Mansion is outed as a haven for mutants, but this otherwise peaceful encounter is marred by an attack by Cassandra Nova. The reporters hide in the Danger Room, during which Tilby apologizes for her past treatment of Beast. They seemingly part as friends.

== In other media ==
- Trish Tilby appears in the X-Men: The Animated Series series finale "Graduation Day".
- Trish Tilby appears in X-Men '97, voiced by Donna J. Fulks.
- Trish Tilby appears in the 2023 X-Men Resistance version of Zombicide.
