= X-Men '97 =

Marvel Studios animated series

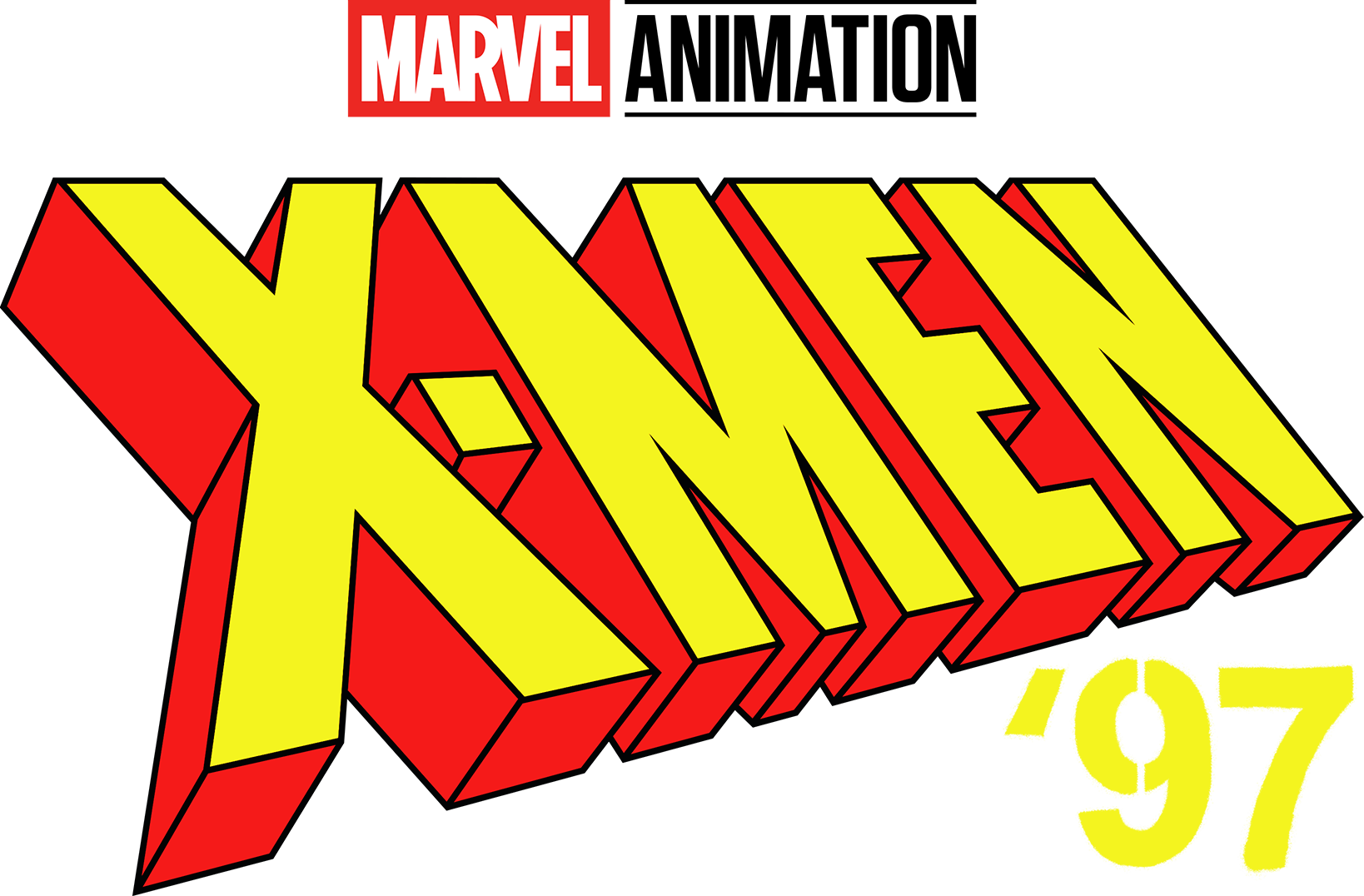
- Genre: Action-adventure; Science fiction; Superhero
- Created by: Beau DeMayo
- Based on: Marvel Comics
- Voices of: Ray Chase; Jennifer Hale; Alison Sealy-Smith; Cal Dodd; J. P. Karliak; Lenore Zann; George Buza; A. J. LoCascio; Holly Chou; Isaac Robinson-Smith; Matthew Waterson; Ross Marquand; Adrian Hough; Chris Potter; Gui Agustini; Naoko Mori; Christopher Barger; Gil Birmingham; Carolina Ravassa
- Theme music composer: Haim Saban; Shuki Levy
- Composer: The Newton Brothers
- Country of origin: United States
- Original language: English
- No. of seasons: 2
- No. of episodes: 19

Production
- Executive producers: Beau DeMayo; Victoria Alonso; Louis D'Esposito; Kevin Feige; Brad Winderbaum; Larry Houston; Eric Lewald; Julia Lewald; Dana Vasquez-Eberhardt; Matthew Chauncey
- Producers: Danielle Costa; Sean Gantka; Alex Scharf
- Editors: Michelle McMillan; Asher Lewis; Rachael Russakoff; Joel Fisher; Graham Fisher
- Running time: 30–43 minutes
- Production company: Marvel Studios Animation

Original release
- Network: Disney+
- Release: March 20, 2024 – present

Related
- X-Men: The Animated Series

X-Men '97 is an American animated television series created by Beau DeMayo for the streaming service Disney+, based on the Marvel Comics superhero team the X-Men. It is a revival of X-Men: The Animated Series (1992–1997) produced by Marvel Studios Animation, and continues the story of the X-Men from the earlier series. DeMayo was head writer for the first two seasons and Matthew Chauncey took over for the third, with Jake Castorena as supervising director.

Ray Chase, Jennifer Hale, Alison Sealy-Smith, Cal Dodd, J. P. Karliak, Lenore Zann, George Buza, A. J. LoCascio, Holly Chou, Isaac Robinson-Smith, Matthew Waterson, Ross Marquand, and Adrian Hough star as members of the X-Men. Sealy-Smith, Dodd, Zann, Buza, and Hough reprised their roles from the original series, as did Christopher Britton, Randall Carpenter and Robert Cait. Original series stars Catherine Disher, Chris Potter, Alyson Court, Lawrence Bayne, and Ron Rubin returned to voice new characters. For season two, Potter, Gui Agustini, and Gil Birmingham were promoted to the starring cast, and Naoko Mori, Christopher Barger, and Carolina Ravassa joined as well.

The revival was first discussed in June 2019 and formally announced in November 2021, with DeMayo and Castorena attached to the first season. It is the first X-Men project from Marvel Studios since the company regained the film and television rights to the characters. Animation was provided by Studio Mir and Tiger Animation, and is a modernized version of the original series' style. Original producers Eric Lewald, Julia Lewald, and Larry Houston returned to consult on the revival and were made executive producers with the second season. Chase Conley and Emi Yonemura also directed episodes. DeMayo was fired as head writer in March 2024 and Chauncey was hired to replace him that July.

X-Men '97 premiered on March 20, 2024. The ten-episode first season was released until May, and the nine-episode second season was released from July to August 2026. A third and fourth season are in development and planned to be released yearly following the second. The series has received critical acclaim and various accolades.

== Premise ==
X-Men '97 continues the story of X-Men: The Animated Series (1992–1997). In both series, mutants are people born with superhuman abilities that generally manifest during puberty. The X-Men are a team of mutant superheroes founded by Professor Charles Xavier to protect mutants and humans alike. At the end of The Animated Series, Xavier nearly dies in an assassination attempt and is taken to space to be healed by the alien Shi'ar Empire. X-Men '97 begins a year later and sees the X-Men facing new challenges without Xavier, under the leadership of their former adversary Magneto. As with the original series, X-Men '97 combines action, soap opera-style drama, and exploration of serious topics.

In the first season, the X-Men face Bastion and his new Sentinel program which targets mutants, with Xavier eventually returning to help the team. This conflict ends with the X-Men being scattered throughout time, from Ancient Egypt to the far future, and in the second season they must find their way back to the 1990s to stop Apocalypse.

== Episodes ==
Season	Episodes	Originally released	
Season	Episodes	First released	Last released
1	10	March 20, 2024	May 15, 2024
2	9	July 1, 2026	August 12, 2026

=== Season 1 (2024) ===
No. overall	No. in season	Title	Directed by	Written by	Original release date
1	1	"To Me, My X-Men"	Jake Castorena	Beau DeMayo	March 20, 2024
2	2	"Mutant Liberation Begins"	Chase Conley	Beau DeMayo	March 20, 2024
3	3	"Fire Made Flesh"	Emi Yonemura	Beau DeMayo and Charley Feldman	March 27, 2024
4	4	"Motendo"	Chase Conley	Beau DeMayo and Charley Feldman	April 3, 2024
4	4	"Lifedeath – Part 1"	Chase Conley	Beau DeMayo and Charley Feldman	April 3, 2024
5	5	"Remember It"	Emi Yonemura	Beau DeMayo	April 10, 2024
6	6	"Lifedeath – Part 2"	Chase Conley	Charley Feldman	April 17, 2024
7	7	"Bright Eyes"	Emi-Emmett Yonemura	Charley Feldman and JB Ballard	April 24, 2024
8	8	"Tolerance Is Extinction"	Chase Conley	Beau DeMayo and Anthony Sellitti	May 1, 2024
9	9	"Tolerance Is Extinction"	Emi-Emmett Yonemura	Anthony Sellitti	May 8, 2024
10	10	"Tolerance Is Extinction"	Chase Conley	Beau DeMayo and Anthony Sellitti	May 15, 2024

=== Season 2 (2026) ===
No. overall	No. in season	Title	Directed by	Written by	Original release date
11	1	"Days of Past Future"	Emmett Yonemura	Brian Ford Sullivan	July 1, 2026
12	2	"A Force to Be Reckoned With"	Emmett Yonemura	Anthony Sellitti and Mariah Wilson	July 1, 2026
13	3	"Rise of Apocalypse"	Chase Conley	Beau DeMayo and JB Ballard	July 1, 2026
14	4	"Rise of Apocalypse"	Chase Conley	Beau DeMayo and Anthony Sellitti	July 8, 2026
15	5	"Weapon X, Lies, and DVDs"	Chase Conley	Anthony Sellitti	July 15, 2026
16	6	"Danger.exe"	Emmett Yonemura	Beau DeMayo and Mariah Wilson and Bailey Moore	July 22, 2026
17	7	"Strange Land, Savage Heart"	Emmett Yonemura	Brian Ford Sullivan and Beau DeMayo	July 29, 2026
18	8	"The Dead Man's Hand"	Chase Conley and Emmett Yonemura	Brian Ford Sullivan, JB Ballard, Beau DeMayo and Anthony Sellitti	August 5, 2026
19	9	"Survival of the Fittest"	Chase Conley and Emmett Yonemura	Brian Ford Sullivan	August 12, 2026

== Cast and characters ==
=== Main ===
- Ray Chase as Scott Summers / Cyclops:
  The mutant field leader of the X-Men whose eyes emit powerful beams of concussive energy. Cyclops is prepared to lead the X-Men after the loss of Charles Xavier, before Magneto takes that role. Chase replaces Cyclops's original voice actor Norm Spencer, who died in 2020. Chase had not seen the original series when he auditioned, and was provided clips and references for the character's voice to base his performance on. After being cast, he watched the original series and listened to interviews of Spencer.
- Jennifer Hale as Jean Grey:
  A powerful telepathic and telekinetic mutant who is married to Cyclops, and was once the host of the cosmic entity Phoenix Force. Her relationship with Cyclops is complicated by Wolverine's feelings for her. Hale, who previously voiced the character in other Marvel media, replaces original series voice actress Catherine Disher, and based her performance on Disher's voice.
  - Hale also voices Madelyne Pryor / Goblin Queen, a mutant clone of Jean created by Mister Sinister. Madelyne gives birth to Cyclops's son Nathan, which further complicates his relationship with Jean. Hale used a slightly different tone when voicing Madelyne to separate her from Jean.
  - Hale also voices Rahne Sinclair / Wolfsbane, a member of X-Factor who can turn into a wolf and a half-wolf form.
- Alison Sealy-Smith as Ororo Munroe / Storm: A powerful mutant who can control the weather and is described as a "goddess". Sealy-Smith reprises her role from the original series.
  - Sealy-Smith also voices Adversary, a demon that feeds on negative emotions
- Cal Dodd as Logan / Wolverine: A hotheaded mutant with a regenerative healing factor, heightened senses, retractable claws, and an adamantium-laced skeleton. Dodd reprises his role from the original series.
- J. P. Karliak as Morph:
  A mutant metamorph who can change their voice and appearance to that of any person and gain some of their physical abilities. Morph's base design is updated from the original series to be "pale, hairless, and blankly-featured" similar to the version of the character seen in the "Age of Apocalypse" comic book storyline and the Exiles comic book. Morph identifies as non-binary, but the series does not explicitly use that term as it was not common in the 1990s. Characters that Morph shape-shifts into in the first season include Xavier, Jean Grey, Archangel, Blob, Lady Deathstryke, Colossus, Psylocke, Sabretooth, Spiral, Illyana Rasputina / Magik / Darkchylde, Quicksilver, Juggernaut, Hulk, Mister Sinister, Sauron, and Mister Fantastic. Karliak replaces Morph's original voice actor Ron Rubin.
  - Karliak also voices William Stryker, an anti-mutant Christian minister; and the superhero Hulk
- Lenore Zann as Anna-Marie Darkholme / Rogue:
  A mutant who absorbs the memories, powers, and energy of those she touches. The series reveals that Rogue had a secret romantic relationship with Magneto when she was younger, causing friction in her current relationship with Gambit. Zann reprises her role from the original series.
- George Buza as Dr. Henry "Hank" McCoy / Beast: A blue-furred mutant genius with superhuman strength and agility. Buza reprises his role from the original series.
- A. J. LoCascio as Remy LeBeau / Gambit:
  A mutant and former thief who can charge objects with explosive kinetic energy, including his signature playing cards. Gambit's actions in the early episodes—including wearing a crop top and taking his shirt off, and his relationship with Rogue—were intended to endear the audience to him before his death at the end of the fifth episode. LoCascio replaces Gambit's original voice actor Chris Potter.
  - LoCascio also voices Bobby LeBeau, the brother of Gambit and "Chosen One" of the Thieves Guild
- Holly Chou as Jubilation Lee / Jubilee:
  The youngest member of the X-Men who can create firework-like explosions. Chou replaces Jubilee's original voice actor Alyson Court, who previously said she would not reprise the role and would prefer that an Asian-American actor take it. Court instead voices Abscissa.
- Isaac Robinson-Smith as Lucas Bishop: A mutant from a dystopian future with the ability to absorb kinetic energy and redirect it into concussive blasts. Robinson-Smith replaces original actor Philip Akin.
  - Robinson-Smith also voices T'Chaka / Black Panther, the king of Wakanda. The character's appearance creates an apparent continuity error with the animated series Fantastic Four (1994–1996), in which he dies and is succeeded by his son T'Challa; while developing the first season in early 2021, Marvel Studios and creator Beau DeMayo felt it was too soon to feature T'Challa following the August 2020 death of Chadwick Boseman—who portrayed T'Challa / Black Panther in the Marvel Cinematic Universe (MCU) films—and chose to "put humanity before continuity" by featuring T'Chaka instead.
- Matthew Waterson as Erik "Magnus" Lehnsherr / Magneto:
  A powerful mutant who controls magnetism. Magneto is given control of the X-Men in the last will and testament of Charles Xavier. Waterson replaces Magneto's original voice actor David Hemblen, who died in 2020.
  - Waterson also voices Eson, a member of the Celestials who Rogue enlists to free Gambit from Apocalypse's control.
- Ross Marquand as Professor Charles Xavier / Professor X:
  The founder of the X-Men who was taken to space to be healed by the Shi'ar Empire following an assassination attempt. Marquand replaces Xavier's original voice actor Cedric Smith. Coincidentally, both actors previously provided the voice for Marvel villain Red Skull in different projects.
  - Marquand also voices Doctor Doom, the leader of Latveria who is a member of "Operation: Zero Tolerance" (OZT).
  - Marquand also voices Apocalypse, one of the first mutants who is thousands of years old and an enemy of the X-Men. Marquand replaces John Colicos and James Blendick, who voiced Apocalypse in the original series.
- Adrian Hough as Kurt Wagner / Nightcrawler:
  A Catholic, blue mutant with teleporting abilities and prehensile hands and feet. Hough reprises his role from the original series in X-Men '97, which includes the character's playfulness from the comics.
  - Hough also voices Strong Guy, a mutant who can channel kinetic energy into physical strength
- Chris Potter as Nathan Summers / Cable: The son of Cyclops and Madelyne Pryor who was taken to the future as an infant after being infected with a techno-organic virus. Potter voiced Gambit in the original series and replaced original Cable actor Lawrence Bayne.
  - Michael Johnston voices young Nathan Summers.
- Gui Agustini as Roberto da Costa / Sunspot: A young mutant rescued by the X-Men who can channel solar energy.
- Naoko Mori as Betsy Braddock / Psylocke: A psychic mutant who can form psychic energy blades.
- Christopher Barger as Warren Worthington III / Archangel: A mutant with metallic bird-like wings. Barger replaces original series actor Stephen Ouimette.
- Gil Birmingham as Forge: A mutant who can invent advanced technology. Birmingham replaces Forge's original voice actor Marc Strange, who died in 2012.
- Carolina Ravassa as Lorna Dane / Polaris: A mutant with magnetic abilities who is the biological daughter of Magneto and the wife of Havok. Ravassa replaces Polaris's original voice actor, Mary Long.

=== Recurring ===
- Catherine Disher as Dr. Valerie Cooper: A United Nations official. Disher voiced Jean Grey in the original series.
- Gavin Hammon as Dr. Bolivar Trask: Creator of the Sentinel program. Hammon replaces Trask's original voice actor Brett Halsey.
  - Hammon also voices Shi'ar chancellor Lord Araki
- Eric Bauza as the Master Mold supercomputer and mutant-hunting Sentinels. Bauza replaces original voice actor David Fox, who died in 2021.
- Donna Jay Fulks as Trish Tilby: A news reporter
  - Fulks also voices the mutants Tommy and Amelia Voght, replacing Amelia's original voice actor Susan Roman
- Christopher Britton as
  - Dr. Nathaniel Essex / Mister Sinister: A scientist from Victorian era-London who enhanced himself using mutant DNA. Britton reprises his role from the original series.
  - Logos
- Christine Uhebe as Nina da Costa: Roberto's mother
- Theo James as Bastion: The anti-mutant leader of OZT, a human-machine hybrid created by Nimrod whose parents were background characters in the original series episode "One Man's Worth"
- Ron Rubin as:
  - Robert Kelly: The U.S. president. Rubin, who voiced Morph in the original series, replaces Kelly's original voice actor Len Carlson, who died in 2006.
  - Multiple Man: A member of X-Factor with the ability to duplicate himself.
- Rachel Kimsey as:
  - Apocalypse's ship
  - Danger: The A.I. of the Danger Room that gains sentience.
  - Bella Donna: Gambit's ex-girlfriend
- Teddy Sears as Alex Summers / Havok: A member of X-Factor.
- Debra Wilson as Candra / X-Ternal

=== Guest ===
- Lawrence Bayne as
  - Carl Denti / X-Cutioner: Leader of the anti-mutant group Friends of Humanity. Bayne voiced Cable in the original series.
  - Abraham Kieros: A member of the Horsemen of Apocalypse.
- Todd Haberkorn as
  - Henry Peter Gyrich: A former government agent who attempted to assassinate Xavier. Haberkorn replaces original voice actor Barry Flatman.
  - Ronan the Accuser: A high-ranking member of the Kree Empire
  - Abraham Cornelius: A Weapon X scientist.
- David Errigo Jr. as
  - Leech: A young Morlock who can nullify other mutants' powers. Errigo replaces original voice actor John Stocker.
  - Mojo: An interdimensional media mogul from the Mojoverse. Errigo replaces original voice actor Peter Wildman.
  - Sean Cassidy / Banshee: An Irish mutant with a sonic scream who serves on the council of Genosha. Errigo replaces original actor Jeremy Ratchford.
  - Gladiator: The Strontian leader of the Shi'ar Imperial Guard. Errigo replaces original voice actor Richard Eden.
- Courtenay Taylor as
  - Callisto: The leader of the Morlocks. Taylor replaces original voice actor Susan Roman.
  - Illyana Rasputina / Magik / Darkchylde: A mutant sorceress. Taylor replaces original voice actress Tara Strong.
- Kimberly Woods as Shard: Bishop's younger sister, who appears to him in a vision. Woods replaces original voice actor Kay Tremblay.
- Alyson Court as Abscissa: An older version of Jubilee from the "Motendo" video game world. Court voiced Jubilee in the original series.
- Abby Trott as Spiral: Mojo's assistant. Trott replaces original voice actor Cynthia Belliveau.
- Martha Marion as
  - Emma Frost: A former member of the Inner Circle Club who serves on the council of Genosha. Marion replaces original voice actor Cynthia Dale. In the second season, Frost is voiced by Zehra Fazal.
  - Dr. Moira MacTaggert: A Scottish geneticist who serves on the council of Genosha. Marion replaces original voice actor Lally Cadeau.
- Travis Willingham as Sebastian Shaw: A former member of the Inner Circle Club who serves on the council of Genosha. Willingham replaces original voice actor David Bryant.
- Morla Gorrondonna as Lilandra Neramani: The empress of the Shi'ar Empire. Gorrondonna replaces original voice actor Camilla Scott.
- Cari Kabinoff as Deathbird: Lilandra's sister.
- Josh Keaton as Steve Rogers / Captain America: A World War II veteran who was enhanced to the peak of human physicality by an experimental serum. Keaton reprises his role from the animated series What If...? (2021–2024). Keaton replaces original voice actor Lawrence Bayne.
- Michael Patrick McGill as Thunderbolt Ross: A U.S. Army general who has dedicated his life to capturing the Hulk. McGill reprises his role from the animated series What If...?.
- Jeff Bennett as Ford: The da Costa family's butler
- Kari Wahlgren as
  - Sebastian: A young version of Bastion.
  - Rose: Bastion's mother.
- Anjali Bhimani as Daria: Bastion's assistant.
- Rama Vallury as Baron Helmut Zemo: A member of OZT.
- Gates McFadden as Rachel Summers / Mother Askani: The leader of the Askani Clan in a desolate future.
- Adetokumboh M'Cormack as En Sabah Nur: A younger version of Apocalypse living in Ancient Egypt.
- Tony Amendola as Ozymandias: A stone-skinned servant of Apocalypse.
- Thomas Dekker as Quentin Quire: A psychic mutant.
- Miatta Ade Lebile as Monet
- Michael Dorn as Baal: The father figure of Apocalypse
- John De Lancie as Rama-Tut: An alternate version of Kang the Conqueror who was Apocalypse's rival.
- Lake Bell as Natasha Romanova / Black Widow: A Russian spy. Bell reprises the role from the series What If...?.
- Darin De Paul as:
  - Graydon Creed Sr. / Sabretooth: A rival of Wolverine with adamantium finger claws who was one of Weapon X's experiments.
  - Omega Red: A Russian old enemy of the X-Men with Carbonadium coils that emit from below his wrists.
- Erika Ishii as Yuriko Oyama / Lady Deathstrike: A cyborg enemy of Wolverine with long claws.
- Crispin Freeman as David North / Maverick: A mutant who was one of Weapon X's experiments.
- Ben Pronsky as:
  - Garrison Kane: A cyborg who was one of Weapon X's experiments.
  - Graydon Creed Jr.: A human anti-mutant activist son of Sabretooth and Mystique.
- Adrienne Barbeau as Sister Anne, a nun.
- Zeno Robinson as Synch: A mutant with the ability to duplicate superpowers.
- Robert Cait as Piotr "Peter" Rasputin / Colossus: A mutant who can turn his skin into organic metal. Cait reprises his role from the original series.
- Bo Poraj as Exodus: An immortal psychic member of the Acolytes.
- Randall Carpenter as Raven Darkhölme / Mystique: A blue-skinned shapeshifting mutant who is the mother of Rogue, Nightcrawler, and Graydon Creed. Carpenter reprises her role from the earlier episodes of the original series.

Additional voices in each season provided by Rajia Baroudi, Oscar Camacho, David Chen, David W. Collins, Terri Douglas, Robin Atkin Downes, Kellen Goff, Martha Harris, Olenka Walls Kimball, Marcella Lentz-Pope, Scott Menville, Andrew Morgado, Jon Olson, Michael Ralph, Kaitlyn Robrock, Helen Sadler, Patrick Seitz, Justin Shaw, Shane Sweet, Diamond White, Debra Wilson, Matthew Wood, Michael Woodley, and Shelby Young.

== Production ==
=== Development ===
==== Announcement and first season ====
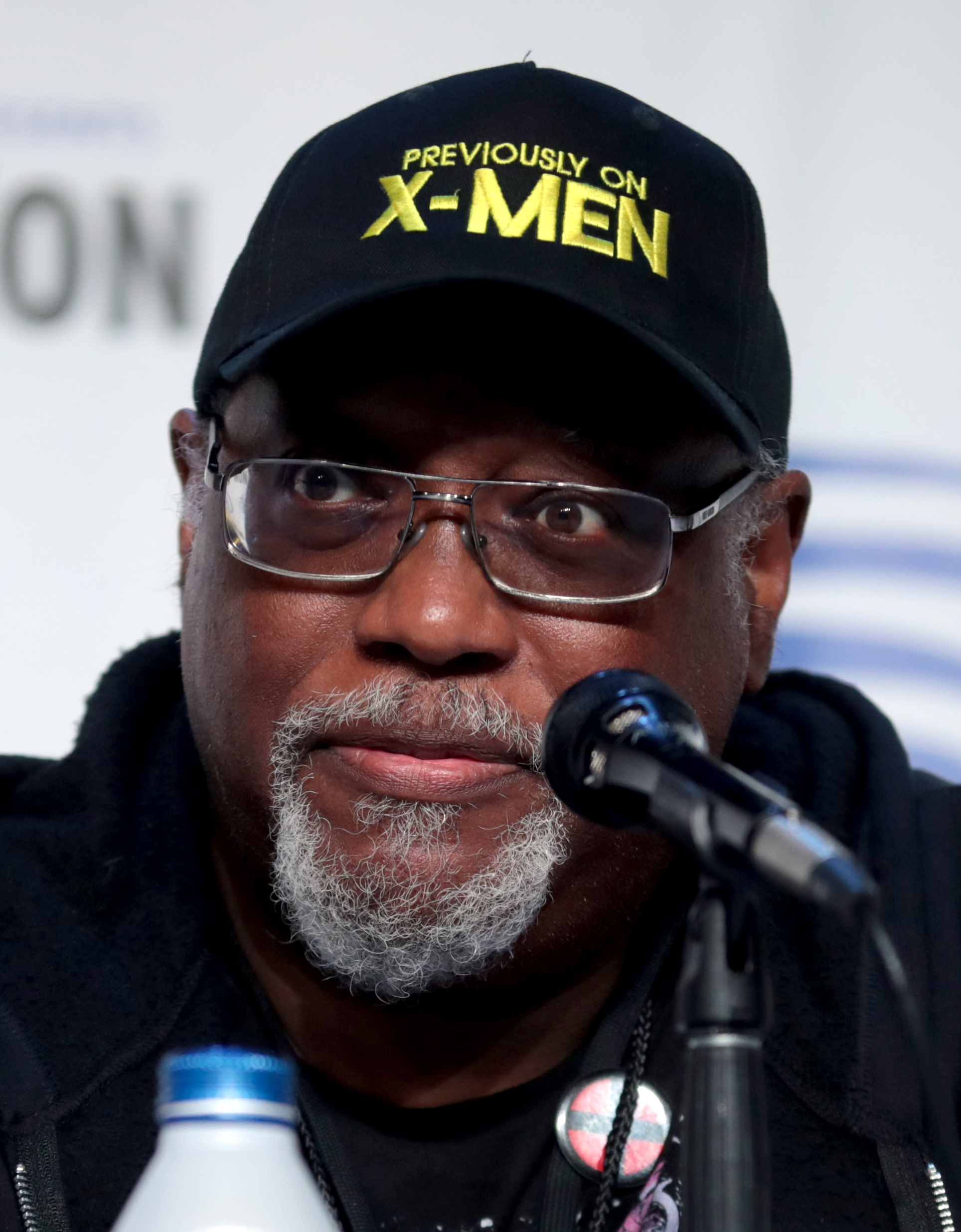
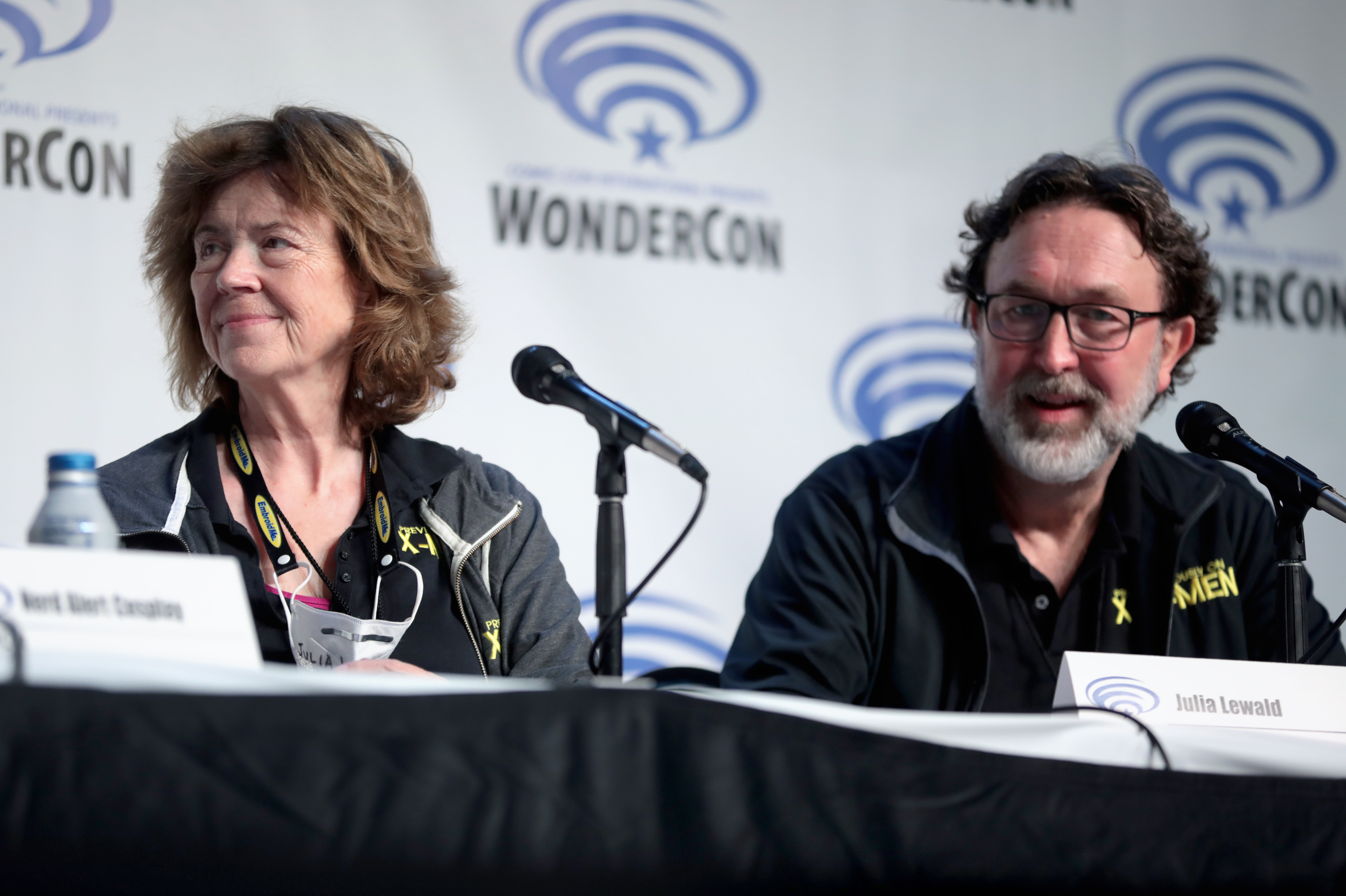
X-Men: The Animated Series producers Larry Houston, Julia Lewald, and Eric Lewald returned to consult on X-Men '97. They became executive producers with the second season.

Larry Houston, the producer and director of X-Men: The Animated Series (1992–1997), said in June 2019 that he and that series' creative team were discussing a potential revival with Disney. They wanted to continue the story from where the original series ended. Disney subsidiary Marvel Studios was developing their first animated series, What If...? (2021–2024), and executives began discussing what their next animated project could be. The first idea considered was a revival of X-Men: The Animated Series, which was suggested by Brad Winderbaum. The head of streaming, television, and animation at Marvel Studios, Winderbaum was a fan of the series, and said several filmmakers who had met with Marvel Studios in the past had cited that series as a touchstone. In November 2020, Beau DeMayo was asked to present a pitch for the revival after working as a writer for Marvel Studios' live-action Disney+ miniseries Moon Knight (2022). Jeff Trammell also presented a pitch for the revival, but his desire to create an original story rather than continue the narrative from X-Men: The Animated Series led to Marvel Studios suggesting he present a pitch for their Spider-Man animated series, Your Friendly Neighborhood Spider-Man (2025–present), instead.

By June 2021, Marvel Studios Animation was developing a slate of at least three series in addition to What If...? that, as of August 2021, were in various stages of development and not expected to be released until 2023. In November, one of these was announced to be X-Men '97, a revival and continuation of X-Men: The Animated Series. Dana Vasquez-Eberhardt, VP of animation at Marvel Studios, said many of the people involved with the revival were fans of the 1990s series and "knew exactly" what the continuation should be. DeMayo was announced as head writer and executive producer, with Jake Castorena as supervising director and Charley Feldman as supervising producer. Houston and the original series' showrunners, Eric and Julia Lewald, were consulting on the revival, assisting with any "red flags" that arose and suggesting things they would like to see. The trio were contacted by Winderbaum shortly after the revival series entered development, and were excited that Marvel chose to make a direct continuation of their series. The Lewalds attributed Disney and Marvel Studios' decision to fast-track the revival to the success of the original series streaming on Disney+ and the release of the book X-Men: The Art and Making of The Animated Series (2020). Castorena, Chase Conley, and Emi Yonemura directed episodes of the first season. Marvel Studios' Winderbaum, Kevin Feige, Louis D'Esposito, and Victoria Alonso also served as executive producers.

The series was the first X-Men project from Marvel Studios since they regained the film and television rights to the characters from 20th Century Fox, which put more pressure on DeMayo to get the project right in addition to wanting to respect the original series. X-Men '97 is not set in the Sacred Timeline of Marvel Studios' shared universe, the Marvel Cinematic Universe (MCU), though Feige did consider integrating the series with the MCU during development. Instead, X-Men '97 shares continuity with the original series and several other animated Marvel series that were released in the 1990s, including Iron Man (1994–1996), Fantastic Four (1994–1996), Spider-Man: The Animated Series (1994–1998), The Incredible Hulk (1996–97), and Silver Surfer (1998); within Marvel Comics' multiverse, X-Men: The Animated Series exists on Earth-92131. Winderbaum said X-Men '97 would continue the original series' tradition of featuring crossover cameo appearances from the other 1990s series. During Marvel Studios Animation's panel at the 2022 San Diego Comic-Con, X-Men '97 and the studio's other animated series were described as being part of the "Marvel Animated Multiverse", and Winderbaum said there was potential to connect the series with other MCU properties using the MCU's multiverse.

==== Firing of DeMayo and further seasons ====
Work on a second season had begun by July 2022, with Conley and Yonemura returning as directors. By March 2024, DeMayo had finished writing for the season, and had begun discussing ideas for a potential third season when he was fired by Marvel Studios ahead of the series' premiere. He was not involved in further promotion for the series and missed its red carpet premiere, which The Hollywood Reporter said was unusual for someone working on a Marvel Studios project, "even if they've been shuffled to the side" or replaced by other creatives. Marvel said DeMayo had been fired after an investigation that led to "egregious" findings, which reportedly involved sexual misconduct. An agreement made following DeMayo's exit allowed him to still tweet about the series. Winderbaum praised DeMayo's work on the series and said his departure would not negatively affect work on the third season, which was in development by the end of the month and remained on track to meet its production schedule. The studio was searching for DeMayo's replacement by then.

In June 2024, after DeMayo posted gay pride-themed X-Men fan art on his Instagram account, Marvel told him they would be removing his credits from the second season because of the post. This decision was reportedly based on multiple instances that Marvel viewed as violations of DeMayo's termination agreement, in addition to the fan art post. DeMayo said the breaches of his termination agreement were posts that he had made about the first season while it was being released, along with him participating in a screening of the series at a bar. His lawyer Bryan Freedman said the agreement included "illegal unconscionable items". DeMayo released a video in which he denied reports of his own egregious misconduct and accused crew members and Marvel executives of "egregious prejudicial misconduct" against him, saying others had weaponized his identity as a gay Black man to undermine his work. He listed a series of concerns about crew and executives who worked on the series, and also suggested that his role on the second season had been "aggressively marginalized" before his firing due to concerns that he had expressed about the workplace culture of Marvel's Blade while he was working on that project. DeMayo ultimately retained his creator, executive producer, and writing credits for the second season. Matthew Chauncey, a writer on What If...?, was hired in July to write and executive produce the third season, replacing DeMayo. The scripts for the second season had reportedly been revised and rewritten by then, with Chauncey overseeing the rewrites.

Houston and the Lewalds were made executive producers starting with the second season, with Winderbaum, Feige, D'Esposito, Vasquez-Eberhardt, and DeMayo also serving as executive producers for the season; Castorena was a supervising producer. In February 2025, Winderbaum said the season would be released in 2026, more than a year after the first. He said X-Men '97 and Your Friendly Neighborhood Spider-Man were the studio's top priorities for "get[ting] to a place where we can reliably have very strong seasons every year", and in October he said future seasons would be released annually "for a number of years". He confirmed that the third season was in production and said discussions about potential fourth and fifth seasons had begun. Winderbaum also addressed questions about future seasons living up to the first season without DeMayo's involvement, saying the rest of the creative team—directors, writers, producers, and cast—remained mostly the same, Houston and the Lewalds continued to be closely involved, and he believed the revival worked because "everyone that works on the show knows that original series inside and out... the second season feels very much a worthy successor to the first season". By May 2026, scripts for a fourth season were being written.

=== Writing ===
The series' bible was written by April 2022, and confirms that—as with the original series and the comic books—the revival's central ethos is the X-Men are allegories for people who face prejudice and discrimination. Eric Lewald described X-Men '97 as an extension of the original series that the Marvel Studios team had made their own, while Vasquez-Eberhardt said the original series "embraced action, soap opera and serious topics", and the revival would do the same. DeMayo wanted to honor the original series while bringing it into the modern world, hoping to retain its earnestness, emotional sincerity, and focus on found family while updating the social commentary to reflect contemporary society. The new series explores whether Professor Charles Xavier's dream of mutant/human co-existence and his focus on empathy are still relevant to modern audiences, with DeMayo feeling that issues of social acceptance had become more complicated since the 1990s.

The revival begins a year after the loss of Xavier during the original series' finale. The main antagonists for the first season are the returning Mister Sinister and the Sentinels, along with new villain Bastion. As with the original series, various comic book storylines were adapted for the revival. The Animated Series was primarily influenced by Chris Claremont's run on the comics from the mid-1970s to the early 1990s, and X-Men '97 continues to adapt stories from that era as well as elements from the late 1990s and into Grant Morrison's early 2000s run. The second season features a storyline centered around the villain Apocalypse, and sees the X-Men being scattered throughout time and needing to find their way back to the 1990s from different points in the past and future. DeMayo's original plan for the series was to rotate the central characters each season, with Gambit planned to be the focal character of DeMayo's third season.

=== Casting ===
Starring in the first season are Ray Chase as Scott Summers / Cyclops, Jennifer Hale as Jean Grey, Alison Sealy-Smith as Ororo Munroe / Storm, Cal Dodd as Logan / Wolverine, J. P. Karliak as Morph, Lenore Zann as Rogue, George Buza as Dr. Henry "Hank" McCoy / Beast, A. J. LoCascio as Remy LeBeau / Gambit, Holly Chou as Jubilation Lee / Jubilee, Isaac Robinson-Smith as Lucas Bishop, Matthew Waterson as Erik "Magnus" Lehnsherr / Magneto, Ross Marquand as Professor Charles Xavier, and Adrian Hough as Kurt Wagner / Nightcrawler. Sealy-Smith, Dodd, Zann, Buza, and Hough reprised their roles from the original series, as did Christopher Britton as Mister Sinister. Original series stars Catherine Disher, Chris Potter, Alyson Court, Lawrence Bayne, and Ron Rubin returned to voice new characters.

Returning for the second season are Hale, Dodd, Zann, and Marquand, as well as Bayne.

=== Animation and design ===
The character designs for Rogue, Cyclops, Jubilee, and Bishop in X-Men '97, by lead character designer Amelia Vidal. Vidal aimed to retain the designs from the original series and the comic books of the 1970s to the 1990s.

Animation was provided by Studio Mir and Tiger Animation. The 2D animation style of the original series was retained, but "slightly modernized" to improve the quality and reflect advances in animation since the 1990s. Castorena's pitch for the job of supervising director was to make the series "fresh, but familiar", and he said it needed to be "the show we remember, but it has to be in 4K". Houston advised the animation team on how the original series was made, and the storyboard artists reviewed the original to inform their composition, editing, and cinematography decisions. Winderbaum said there was a "code of ethics" they followed to align with the restrictions of the 1990s animation, but they occasionally broke this for dramatic effect such as during key action sequences. A VHS-inspired effect was applied to the animation to make it appear more like 1990s television. 3D animation was used to lay out scenes and create more complicated vehicles and ships, but the animation team drew over this in 2D to maintain the series' art style.

The opening title sequence of The Animated Series was recreated with updated animation for the revival. Houston worked with episodic directors Conley and Yonemura to recreate the title sequence based on Houston's original storyboards. DeMayo said the costumes chosen for each character indicated which comic book storylines were being adapted by the series. Lead character designer Amelia Vidal retained the design concepts from the original series along with the style and aesthetics of the X-Men comic books of the 1970s to the 1990s. Any changes from those were made to either better serve the story or to assist with the technical side of the animation. Castorena said mutant powers were used in unique ways to convey their emotions, and his goal was to use mutant powers in ways that had not been seen before. Morph's shape-shifting powers allow for cameo appearances of other mutants.

=== Music ===
One of Feige's stipulations for reviving X-Men: The Animated Series was ensuring Marvel Studios was able to use that series' theme song, which was composed by Ron Wasserman. Wasserman composed the theme while under contract with producer Haim Saban, giving legal ownership of the song to Saban. Following legal battles over the use of the theme, Marvel Studios paid a large sum to secure the rights to it in 2022. This was done on the condition that it be re-recorded for future projects and credited to the original series' music executives, Saban and Shuki Levy. Wasserman was set to meet with Marvel about his involvement in the revival by early 2022, but John Andrew Grush and Taylor Newton Stewart—known professionally as the Newton Brothers—were announced to be the composers for X-Men '97 that July.

External videos
- The Newton Brothers – X-Men '97 Theme (From "X-Men '97") presents the series' opening title sequence and theme song recreated from the original series, YouTube video from MarvelMusicVevo's channel

The Newton Brothers were hired while Marvel was still in the process of securing the rights for the original theme. On revisiting the original series, the composers realized that the music did not match with their childhood memories and many of the original synthesizer sounds would now sound dated to modern audiences. They chose to modernize the score with an orchestra, choir, and some modern synthesizers. However, they felt the theme song should remain more true to the original style, to not "ruin the nostalgic vibes" and embrace the sincerity of the original series. They produced eight different versions of the theme, each with a different amount of orchestral music versus synthesizer music, before settling on the final version. The main melody is played on a synthesizer and an electric guitar, the latter performed by Nili Brosh. The X-Men '97 version of the theme, credited to Saban and Levy, was first heard in the MCU film Doctor Strange in the Multiverse of Madness (2022) and then the series Ms. Marvel (2022) when those projects referenced mutants.

The X-Men '97 version of the main theme was released by Marvel Music and Hollywood Records as a digital single on March 20, 2024. A full soundtrack album for the first season was released on May 24.

== Release ==
X-Men '97 premiered on Disney+ on March 20, 2024, with its first two episodes. The rest of the ten-episode first season was released weekly until May 15. The season was originally scheduled for release in late 2023. It aired on Disney's cable channel FXX from June 30 to July 4, 2025. The second season premiered on July 1, 2026, with its first three episodes. The rest of the nine-episode season released weekly until August 12. Winderbaum and Houston said that future seasons would be released annually, with the third season planned for release in 2027 and the fourth in 2028.

== Reception ==
=== Viewership ===
Disney announced that the first two episodes had 4 million views worldwide in the five days following their release, marking the biggest first-season premiere for a full-length animated series on the service since the first season of What If...? in 2021. The company announced that the first-season finale was watched by 3.5 million views globally during its first five days, which was similarly the biggest season finale for a full-length animated series on the streaming service since the first season of What If...?

=== Critical response ===
Critical response of X-Men '97
Season	Rotten Tomatoes	Metacritic
1	99% (81 reviews)	82 (14 reviews)
2	100% (33 reviews)	90 (6 reviews)

The first season received critical acclaim, was called "Marvel's best release in years", and was praised for its nostalgic animation, "smart writing, and captivating action sequences". Review aggregator website Rotten Tomatoes calculated that 99% of 81 critics reviews were positive, with an average rating of 8.9 out of 10. The website's critics consensus reads, "Pulling off the x-traordinary feat of staying true to its beloved predecessor while charting a path forward for the franchise, X-Men '97 is simply x-cellent." Metacritic assigned a weighted average score of 82 out of 100 based on 14 reviews, indicating "universal acclaim".

For the second season, Rotten Tomatoes calculated that 100% of 33 critics reviews were positive, with an average of rated reviews of 8.60 out of 10. The website's critics consensus reads, "This marvelous troupe of heroes returns for a supremely dazzling second season, providing all the entertainment, emotion, and nostalgia that top-tier animation and storytelling can deliver in X-Men '97." Metacritic assigned a weighted average score of 90 out of 100 based on 6 reviews, indicating "universal acclaim".

=== Accolades ===
Accolades received by X-Men '97
Award	Date of ceremony	Category	Recipient(s)	Result	Ref.
ACE Eddie Awards	March 14, 2025	Best Edited Animated Series	Michelle McMillan (for "Remember It")	Won	
Annie Awards	February 8, 2025	Outstanding Achievement for Character Design in an Animated Television / Broadcast Production	Amelia Vidal (for "Mutant Liberation Begins")	Nominated	
Astra TV Awards	December 8, 2024	Best Animated Series or TV Movie	X-Men '97	Won	
Astra TV Awards	December 8, 2024	Best Voice-Over Performance	Jennifer Hale	Nominated	
Astra TV Awards	December 8, 2024	Best Voice-Over Performance	Lenore Zann	Nominated	
Astra TV Awards	December 8, 2024	Best Voice-Over Performance	Matthew Waterson	Nominated	
Black Reel TV Awards	August 13, 2024	Outstanding Drama Series	Beau DeMayo	Nominated	
Black Reel TV Awards	August 13, 2024	Outstanding Directing in a Drama Series	Chase Conley (for "Tolerance Is Extinction, Part 1")	Nominated	
Black Reel TV Awards	August 13, 2024	Outstanding Writing in a Drama Series	Beau DeMayo (for "Remember It")	Won	
Critics' Choice Television Awards	February 7, 2025	Best Animated Series	X-Men '97	Won	
Dorian TV Awards	August 12, 2024	Best Animated Show	X-Men '97	Won	
Golden Reel Awards	February 23, 2025	Outstanding Achievement in Sound Editing – Broadcast Animation	Jonathan Greber, Kyrsten Mate, Jonathon Stevens, David Acord, Cameron Barker, and Jeremy Molod (for "Fire Made Flesh")	Nominated	
Golden Trailer Awards	May 30, 2024	Best Teaser	X-Men '97 "A New Age"	Nominated	
Gotham TV Awards	June 4, 2024	Breakthrough Drama Series	Beau DeMayo, Victoria Alonso, Louis D'Esposito, Kevin Feige, and Brad Winderbaum	Nominated	
Harvey Awards	October 18, 2024	Best Adaptation from Comic Book/Graphic Novel	X-Men '97	Won	
Hollywood Professional Association Awards	November 7, 2024	Outstanding Visual Effects – Animated Episode or Series Season	Chris Graf, Dan McNaughton, Husain Untoro, Quentin Cordonnier, and Andrew Stadler	Won	
Primetime Creative Arts Emmy Awards	September 7, 2024	Outstanding Animated Program	Beau DeMayo, Victoria Alonso, Louis D'Esposito, Kevin Feige, Brad Winderbaum, Dana Vasquez-Eberhardt, Jake Castorena, Charley Feldman, Danielle Costa, Sean Gantka, Meredith Layne, Sang Hyouk Bang, Yun Mo Sung, and Emi Yonemura (for "Remember It")	Nominated	
Saturn Awards	February 2, 2025	Best Animated Series on Television	X-Men '97	Nominated	
TCA Awards	July 12, 2024	Outstanding New Program	X-Men '97	Nominated	
TCA Awards	July 12, 2024	Outstanding Achievement in Family Programming	X-Men '97	Nominated	
Venice TV Awards	September 24, 2024	Animation	X-Men '97	Nominated	

== Documentary special ==
In February 2021, the documentary series Marvel Studios: Assembled was announced. The specials go behind the scenes of the Marvel Studios films and television series with cast members and additional creatives. The special for this series, "The Making of X-Men '97", features cast members from the original series and X-Men '97, and explores the origins of the original series. It was released on Disney+ on May 22, 2024.
