= Judy Alice Lee =

American actress

- Lee at Dragon Con in 2026
- Education: University of California, Los Angeles
- Occupation: Voice actress
- Years active: 2008–present
- Website: judyalicelee.com

Judy Alice Lee is an American voice actress, primarily known for playing various roles in video games and animated shows.

== Career ==
In 2020, she provided the English voice of Fune in the Iki Island expansion of Ghost of Tsushima.

She has portrayed Yun Jin in the English dub of Genshin Impact since 2022.

In 2022, she was revealed as the voice of Melinoë in Hades II. Her performance was praised by critics during both the game's early access period and after its release as contrasting with Darren Korb's performance of Zagreus.

In 2024, she voiced Luna Snow in Marvel Rivals.

== Personal life ==
Lee is Korean-American. She is a graduate of the University of California, Los Angeles.

== Filmography ==
=== Television ===
Year	Title	Role	Notes	Ref(s)
2021	Trolls: TrollsTopia	Bi-Na (voice)	Episode: "The Not So Good Sport"	
2021	Sharkdog	Olivia (voice)	Main role	
2021	The Casagrandes	Yi (voice)	Episode: "Bunstoppable"	
2021	He-Man and the Masters of the Universe	Ram-Ma'am (voice)	Main role	
2022	Tekken: Bloodline	Akiko Miura (voice: English dub)	3 episodes	
2022	The Loud House	Ali, Student (voices)	Episode: "Stroke of Luck"	
2022	Barbie: Epic Road Trip	Rebecca Lee (voice)	Short	
2023	Star Wars: Visions	Master Moru (voice: English dub)	Episode: "Journey to the Dark Head"	
2023	Hailey's On It!	Rebecca Denoga (voice)	Recurring role	

=== Film ===
Year	Title	Role	Ref(s)
2025	All of It	Alison	
2025	KPop Demon Hunters	Additional Voices	

=== Video games ===
Year	Title	Role	Ref(s)
2018	Call of Duty: Black Ops 4	Seraph	
2020	Ghost of Tsushima	Fune, Bowyer	
2020	Call of Duty: Black Ops Cold War	Kwan Song	
2021	Naraka: Bladepoint	Valda Cui	
2021	Call of Duty: Vanguard	Kim Tae Young, Seraph	
2022	Genshin Impact	Yun Jin	
2022	RWBY: Arrowfell	Ruda Tilleroot	
2023	Diablo IV	Neyrelle	
2023	Path to Nowhere	Coquelic	
2023	Call of Duty: Modern Warfare III	Ari "Dokkaebi" Jo	
2024	Farmagia	Shadie	
2024	Marvel Rivals	Luna Snow	
2025	Old Skies	Hanna Tanaka	
2025	Borderlands 4	Vex	
2025	Hades II	Melinoë	
2025	Ghost of Yōtei	Yone	
2025	Hyrule Warriors: Age of Imprisonment	Qia	
2026	2XKO	Ahri	
2026	Marvel Tōkon: Fighting Souls	Danger, F.R.I.D.A.Y.	
2026	Star Wars Zero Company	Jae Mordant	
