= Hades II =

2025 video game

- Developer: Supergiant Games
- Publisher: Supergiant Games
- Director: Greg Kasavin
- Artist: Jen Zee
- Composers: Darren Korb; Austin Wintory
- Platforms: macOS; Nintendo Switch; Nintendo Switch 2; Windows; PlayStation 5; Xbox Series X/S
- Release: macOS, Switch, Switch 2, Windows; September 25, 2025; PS5, Xbox Series X/S; April 14, 2026
- Genres: Roguelike, action role-playing, hack and slash
- Mode: Single-player

Hades II is a 2025 roguelike action role-playing game developed and published by Supergiant Games, serving as a sequel to Hades (2020), making it the studio's first sequel. Announced in December 2022, it initially released in early access for Windows in May 2024 and for macOS in October 2024. The full game released in September 2025 for both platforms alongside Nintendo Switch and Nintendo Switch 2, and later for PlayStation 5 and Xbox Series X/S in April 2026. The game follows Melinoë, Princess of the Underworld and sister to Zagreus, the protagonist of the first game. Melinoë aims to defeat Chronos, the Titan of Time, with the aid of other Olympian Gods. Hades II received critical acclaim for its gameplay, art style, music, and voice acting, although its ending on release received some criticism.

== Gameplay ==
Gameplay screenshot

Like the first game, Hades II is a roguelike dungeon crawler game. The player controls Melinoë, Princess of the Underworld and sister to the protagonist of the first game, Zagreus. Alongside her mentor Hecate, she aims to defeat Chronos, the Titan of Time, who returned to enact revenge on all gods and mortals who opposed him in the past and subsequently imprisons her family. Along her quest, she is supported by the Olympians, who grant her Boons as she battles her way to Tartarus and subsequently Mount Olympus. She is also aided by mythological figures such as Arachne, Narcissus, Echo, Medea, Circe and Icarus.

Unlike the original game, which had a single path from Tartarus to the surface across four different biomes, the sequel introduces two different paths, an "Underworld" path divided between Erebus, Oceanus, the Fields of Mourning, and Tartarus, and a "Surface" path between the City of Ephyra, the Rift of Thessaly, Mount Olympus, and the Summit. Each new region is unlocked upon clearing the previous.

As with Hades, the player has a primary attack and a secondary "special" attack depending on their weapon of choice, as well as a dash that provides additional mobility. A new version of the magic "cast" allows the player to lock their enemies in place. Also introduced is the "Magick Bar," a combat resource used for slower, more powerful "Omega" variant attacks. Throughout a run, the player will receive Boons from the Olympians, each of which provides a choice of three persistent boosts and effects for that run. One of three Hexes, summon attacks that call upon the power of the goddess Selene, may also be chosen and gradually enhanced via a skill tree each run.

The player move through rooms to gradually descend through the Underworld or fight across the surface. After clearing a room, the player is given the room's rewards, allowing them to grow stronger or recover lost health points. After clearing a certain number of rooms in a region, the player must fight the bosses of the region to advance to the next: Hecate in Erebus, the sea monster Scylla and two sirens in Oceanus, Cerberus in the Fields of Mourning, Chronos in Tartarus, the Cyclops Polyphemus in Ephyra, Eris in the Rift of Thessaly, Prometheus in Mount Olympus, and Typhon at the Summit.

If Melinoë loses all her health points while having no "death defiances" left, she is defeated and must return to the Crossroads, which acts as the game's overworld between attempts. Here, the player can use items recovered from runs to improve future runs, such as unlocking and upgrading abilities for Melinoë, crafting incantations which enable new features to appear in future runs, or obtaining and upgrading new weapons. Melinoë can also interact with the various characters of the Crossroads and improve her bonds with them. The player can also romance non-player characters (NPCs) as the plot progresses.

Returning from Hades is "God Mode", which allows the player to gain more damage resistance after each failed run (20% base value with a 2% increment per failed run up to a total of 80%).

== Plot ==
Chronos, the Titan of Time, returns after being overthrown by his children ages ago. (Note: Chronos' role amalgamates elements of both the actual Chronos and the similarly named Cronus.) He takes over the Underworld and imprisons Hades, Persephone and Zagreus while Hecate escapes with Melinoë, Zagreus' newborn baby sister, to the Crossroads in Erebus. She raises Melinoë and trains her so that she would one day exact revenge on Chronos. After her training is complete, Melinoë descends to Tartarus. Aided by blessings from the Gods of Olympus, Melinoë eventually defeats Chronos. However, Chronos employs his time powers and comes back to life, despite being repeatedly slain by Melinoë.

While looking for a way to defeat Chronos permanently, Melinoë is informed that Mount Olympus is being attacked by Chronos' army under the leadership of the Titan Prometheus, who seeks revenge against the Olympians for imprisoning him, and Typhon, the Father of All Monsters. Melinoë helps the gods defeat them, but only temporarily as they incessantly return to continue their siege. She and Hecate ultimately develop a way to slay Typhon for good and use its power to destroy Chronos permanently with assistance from a past Zagreus, with whom Melinoë manages to communicate through Nyx's Mirror.

After destroying Typhon, Melinoë creates a spell to defeat Chronos. To achieve this, she must kill him in the present while Zagreus does so in the past using Hades' spear. Melinoë defeats Chronos as planned. Instead of killing him in the past, Zagreus reasons with Chronos and makes him repent when he glimpses an alternate timeline where he lived happily with Melinoë and her family. The reformed Chronos releases Hades and the others and they restore the Underworld. Melinoë decides to return with Hecate to the Crossroads and help undo the damage Chronos caused.

After the ending, Chronos helps Melinoë confront different versions of himself and Typhon from alternate timelines to eliminate the possibility of them rising up again. In the epilogue, Melinoë is visited by the Fates, who tell her that they plan to step back from influencing events, allowing the gods to rule themselves in a "golden age" where mortals choose their own destinies.

After visiting The Fates, Melinoë speaks with Hecate and learns that she is, in fact, a version of her from an alternate timeline who successfully killed Chronos. She entered his mind with the intention of destroying him permanently, but was flung back to the beginning of time. She ingratiated herself into the House of Hades to ensure that she could train the younger, alternate version of herself to properly kill Chronos.

== Development ==
Hades, which was released in early access in 2018 and had its full release in 2020, was Supergiant's most successful game by that point, but lead writer Greg Kasavin said the team was undecided as to if the game would receive a sequel. In alignment with Supergiant's development process, after completing a game, the team determines what potential next project excited them the most; it was realized that many on the team felt there were still more stories and mythological characters they could explore that were not included in Hades, which made a sequel the preferred option. However, as this would also be the studio's first sequel, they were aware they wanted to expand on Hades in meaningful ways without losing the core of the original game. Studio head Amir Rao cited examples of Portal 2 and Diablo II as successful sequels they wanted to follow. Work on the sequel began near the start of 2021.

Kasavin said that they knew early on that they did not want to return to Zagreus as the main character. He began researching more into Greek mythology, coming across the Orphic Hymns, one which described Melinoë as the daughter of Hades and Persephone but otherwise had little else written about her. Besides the familial connection to Zagreus, Supergiant had not mentioned her at all within Hades, allowing them to write a fresh story. Melinoë was also tied to the occult side of Greek mythology, allowing them to introduce magic as a gameplay mechanic as well as the figure of Hecate, Melinoë's mentor.

Jen Zee remained as art director for Hades II, following her work on Hades. Among the voice cast includes Asa Butterfield as Icarus and Amelia Tyler as Hecate. Logan Cunningham, a staple of Supergiant's games, returned to voice Hades as well as Chronos and several other mythological figures.

Hades II was revealed during The Game Awards 2022 on December 8, 2022. A technical test began in April 2024 before its release to early access on May 5, 2024. Like its predecessor, Hades II features music by Darren Korb. The soundtrack was made available via Supergiant's YouTube account and their Steam page the same day as the early access launch.

In May 2024, it was discovered that the Hades II's source code was left in game files, allowing for easier modding. The move is believed to be intentional, though Supergiant Games have not commented on this.

On October 16, 2024, a major update titled The Olympic Update, was released. It contained an entirely new region, weapons, and characters. The game also released on macOS with the release of this expansion. On February 19, 2025, the game's second major update, The Warsong Update, was released. During the April 2025 installment of Nintendo Direct, Supergiant Games announced that the full release of Hades II would launch as a timed console exclusive for Nintendo Switch and the newly unveiled Nintendo Switch 2 alongside the Windows version. On June 17, 2025, the final major update for PC early access, The Unseen Update was released.

The full game was released for Nintendo Switch, Nintendo Switch 2 and Windows on September 25, 2025. The physical version was released on November 20, 2025. According to several video game journalism outlets, the game will be released on PlayStation 5 and Xbox Series X/S, (Note: Attributed to multiple references:) though in April 2025, Supergiant said their "current focus is only on [the PC, Nintendo Switch 2, and Nintendo Switch] versions" and did not confirm a release for either console.

Ports of Hades II for PlayStation 5 and Xbox Series X/S were announced by Supergiant Games on March 26, 2026 during that day's Xbox Partner Preview presentation, and released on April 14, 2026. The Xbox release also supports Play Anywhere cross-progression with the Windows version distributed on the Microsoft Store, and was made available simultaneously on the Xbox Game Pass subscription service for the aforementioned platforms. Alongside the PlayStation and Xbox versions, a general update was released for all platforms including new content and quality-of-life improvements.

== Reception ==
=== Critical reception ===
==== Pre-release ====
When comparing a technical test to the first game, Elijah Gonzalez of Paste commented that Hades' "blend of convincing characterization, witty dialogue, and excellent performances is alive and well here. I loved what I saw of Hades II's gameplay upgrades, but what excites me most is how it builds on this world and its characters". Gonzalez opined that while Melinoë has more initial "clarity of purpose" than Zagreus, she's also "dragged down by self-doubt and the pressures of being a savior, making her a similarly complicated and engrossing protagonist". During the technical test, Kotaku praised the sex appeal of the game's character designs, writing that "sexiness is woven into their personalities." Ana Diaz of Polygon highlighted the traditional expression of gender in Greek mythology and how "Hades 2 expands on this ancient Greek idea by giving us witches who are both clever and strong and who defy the stereotypical expectations of them. Melinoë herself isn't exactly a witch, but she was raised by one and she's stronger for it. [...] Melinoë's background shapes who she is as a fighter, and in turn brings a fresh experience to the game". Patricia Hernandez, for The Guardian, noted that like Hades, the sequel's protagonist is an obscure character in Greek mythology and compared the Hades series to Emily Wilson's modern translations of the Iliad and the Odyssey – "where Wilson's work helps recontextualise Greek myth for modern audiences, the Hades series has the audacious aim of expanding those myths". Hernandez opined that "interpersonal (or interdeity) drama" elevated Hades II from a "compelling game" to an "irresistible" one.

On the early access, Hernandez wrote, "even in its current unfinished state, it's evident I will be spending dozens of hours in Hades II" and that "many players will be drawn primarily to the frenetic combat: Supergiant Games fills the dungeons with mobs of creatures so imposing that Melinoë has to slow down time to survive them. [...] Others, meanwhile, will be smitten with the sequel's expanded cast of alluring characters". Mitchell Saltzman of IGN rated the early access game a 9/10 despite it being "a work in progress" with missing or placeholder assets. Saltzman wrote that "Hades 2 feels impossibly huge and unbelievably polished by any standard, much less an early access game. Mel is awesome, the new tweaks to the combat and progression are excellent, and it's just unbelievably feature packed with twice the content of the first. [...] But even with all that it's currently missing, what's here right out of the gate is astounding, and the thought of more coming on the way is a tantalizing treat". Tyler Colp, for PC Gamer, also recommended the early access game and viewed the "current state as like playing part 1 of the full game; all the characters are fully voiced, the combat is already well-balanced, and several features are up and running. A few of the character portraits and environmental art look a little work-in-progress, but otherwise Hades 2 plays like a polished demo". In contrast, in a separate review for Polygon, Diaz commented that players "super invested in the story and characters might want to wait" as many characters and story interactions haven't been added yet – "when Hades was in early access, the story changed a lot throughout the development timeline. If you want a fully realized story, and don't want to be around for the process of the team figuring it out, then early access might not be for you".

As a result of Hades II's surprise early access release, Evil Empire pushed back their planned release of The Rogue Prince of Persia from May 14 to later that month to avoid competition with Hades II.

==== Post-release ====
Reception

Aggregate scores
Aggregator	Score
Metacritic	(PC) 94/100 (Note: Based on 46 reviews) (NS2) 95/100 (Note: Based on 55 reviews) (NS) 98/100 (Note: Based on 5 reviews)
OpenCritic	99% recommend

Review scores
Publication	Score
Destructoid	9.5/10
Eurogamer	5/5
Famitsu	9/10, 9/10, 9/10, 8/10
Game Informer	10/10
GameSpot	10/10
GamesRadar+	4.5/5
Hardcore Gamer	5/5
IGN	10/10
Nintendo Life	9/10
Nintendo World Report	9/10
PC Gamer (US)	88/100
RPGFan	90/100
Shacknews	10/10
The Guardian	4/5
Video Games Chronicle	4/5
VideoGamer.com	10/10

Hades II received "universal acclaim" from critics, according to review aggregator platform Metacritic. OpenCritic, meanwhile, reported that 98% of critics recommended the game. In Japan, four critics from Famitsu gave the game a total score of 35 out of 40.

Critics praised Hades for its gameplay, artwork, voice acting, and soundtrack. In a perfect review, IGN praised the gameplay as "snappy and delightful" and highlighted the two distinct runs the player could make. GameSpot described it as "best looking game the studio has delivered yet." Dualshockers described the voice acting as "incredible across the board." Eurogamer lauded how Darren Korb's music "interacts with the experience."

Some critics felt the game's true ending was underwhelming. Polygon criticized the game for inadequately resolving the conflicts of its story, noting that the game's complex narrative suggested a more nuanced conclusion than what was ultimately presented. Rock Paper Shotgun described the ending as unsatisfying, noting that the game did not end with the player killing Chronos as advertised. Several outlets reported widespread backlash against the ending among audiences online, who expressed frustration with Zagreus's character taking precedence over Melinoë in her own game. Endless Mode expressed dissatisfaction with the unfulfilling ending, but offered an explanation of it as potentially a meta-fictional commentary on the nature of gaming.

A month after the game's release, Supergiant announced changes to the game's ending, adding extra scenes and introducing a feature to revert the game to its pre-conclusion state.

=== Awards ===
Year	Ceremony	Category	Result	Ref.
2023	The Game Awards 2023	Most Anticipated Game	Nominated	
2024	Golden Joystick Awards	Best Early Access Game	Nominated	
2024	UCG Game Awards	Most Promising Game (Independent Game)	Won	
2024	The Steam Awards	Outstanding Visual Style	Nominated	
2024	The Steam Awards	Best Game on Steam Deck	Nominated	
2025	Golden Joystick Awards	Ultimate Game of the Year	Nominated	
2025	Golden Joystick Awards	Best Indie Game - Self Published	Nominated	
2025	Golden Joystick Awards	Best Supporting Performer (Logan Cunningham)	Nominated	
2025	16th Hollywood Music in Media Awards	Song – Video Game (Console & PC)	Nominated	
2025	The Game Awards 2025	Game of the Year	Nominated	
2025	The Game Awards 2025	Best Game Direction	Nominated	
2025	The Game Awards 2025	Best Score and Music	Nominated	
2025	The Game Awards 2025	Best Art Direction	Nominated	
2025	The Game Awards 2025	Best Action Game	Won	
2025	The Game Awards 2025	Best Independent Game	Nominated	
2025	The Steam Awards	Best Game on Steam Deck	Won	
2026	15th New York Game Awards	Big Apple Award for Best Game of the Year	Nominated	
2026	15th New York Game Awards	Statue of Liberty Award for Best World	Won	
2026	15th New York Game Awards	Great White Way Award for Best Acting in a Game (Judy Alice Lee as Melinoë)	Nominated	
2026	15th New York Game Awards	Tin Pan Alley Award for Best Music in a Game	Nominated	
2026	29th Annual D.I.C.E. Awards	Action Game of the Year	Won	
2026	29th Annual D.I.C.E. Awards	Outstanding Achievement in Game Direction	Nominated	
2026	29th Annual D.I.C.E. Awards	Outstanding Achievement in Game Design	Nominated	
2026	7th Pégases	Best International Game	Won	
2026	7th Pégases	Best International Indie Game	Nominated	
2026	24th Game Audio Network Guild Awards	Audio of the Year	Nominated	
2026	24th Game Audio Network Guild Awards	Best Audio for an Indie Game	Won	
2026	24th Game Audio Network Guild Awards	Best Dialogue for an Indie Game	Won	
2026	24th Game Audio Network Guild Awards	Best Ensemble Cast Performance	Nominated	
2026	24th Game Audio Network Guild Awards	Best Music for an Indie Game	Won	
2026	24th Game Audio Network Guild Awards	Best Sound Design for an Indie Game	Won	
2026	24th Game Audio Network Guild Awards	Best Voice Performance (Judy Alice Lee as Melinoë)	Nominated	
2026	24th Game Audio Network Guild Awards	Creative and Technical Achievement in Music	Nominated	
2026	24th Game Audio Network Guild Awards	Dialogue of the Year	Nominated	
2026	26th Game Developers Choice Awards	Best Visual Art	Nominated	
2026	22nd British Academy Games Awards	Best Game	Longlisted	
2026	22nd British Academy Games Awards	Animation	Nominated	
2026	22nd British Academy Games Awards	Artistic Achievement	Longlisted	
2026	22nd British Academy Games Awards	Audio Achievement	Longlisted	
2026	22nd British Academy Games Awards	Game Design	Nominated	
2026	22nd British Academy Games Awards	Music	Longlisted	
2026	22nd British Academy Games Awards	Narrative	Longlisted	
2026	22nd British Academy Games Awards	Performer in a Leading Role (Judy Alice Lee as Melinoë)	Longlisted	
2026	22nd British Academy Games Awards	Performer in a Supporting Role (Amelia Tyler as Hecate)	Longlisted	
