= Melinoë (Hades) =

Fictional character from Hades II

- Hades character
- Melinoë in Hades II
- First appearance: Hades II (2025)
- Voiced by: Judy Alice Lee

In-universe information
- Species: Demigod
- Family: Hades (father); Persephone (mother); Zagreus (brother)

Melinoë is a character in the 2025 video game Hades II. She is the game's protagonist as well as the sister of Zagreus, protagonist of the previous and first game of the series Hades, and daughter of Hades himself, his second born. She is a witch and is able to use magic techniques as well as weapons in combat, tasked with saving her father by killing the Titan Chronos. She is based on the mythological figure of the same name. Her character has received generally positive reception, with her relationships with Hecate and Nemesis being particularly praised.

Like Zagreus, Melinoë is bisexual and can form romantic relationships with Eris, Icarus, Moros, and Nemesis.

== Fictional character biography ==
Melinoë appears as the protagonist of Hades II. She is the Princess of the Underworld, being the daughter of Hades and Persephone, and the younger sister of Zagreus. She was raised by Hecate, who rescued and subsequently hid her from the titan Chronos after he was revived and took vengeance on the House of Hades. During the events of the game, Melinoë has very little connection to her family, as she was taken by Hecate as an infant. However, she is fiercely loyal to them and will stop at nothing to see them freed from Chronos' imprisonment.

Under the protection of Hecate in the Crossroads, Melinoë was trained in the art of witchcraft, which lends her the majority of her abilities. She is also martially proficient in a variety of weaponry, which she uses in tandem with her magical abilities to fight the armies of Chronos.

== Concept and creation ==
Melinoë is based on the mythological figure of the same name from Greek mythology, noted by The Guardian writer Patricia Hernandez as a character believed by some scholars to possibly be a syncretisation of the goddess Persephone. The team at Supergiant Games felt that the little information available for Melinoë was compelling, wanting to explore her story and familial connections, as well as "expand [their] vision of the underworld." They also desired to "explore and highlight magic in Greek mythology and its often misunderstood connections." She is voiced by Judy Alice Lee.

== Reception ==
Melinoë has received generally positive reception. Siliconera writer Kazuma Hashimoto found her interesting, particularly her relationship with Nemesis, which he found intriguing due to the level of hostility between them. Fellow Siliconera writer Brent Koepp agreed, finding himself relating to the rivalry between Melinoë and Nemesis, saying that it had his "blood boiling at first." He also discussed how invested he was in Melinoë's story, wanting to help her rescue her family. The relationship between Melinoë and Hecate was a standout moment for Arstechnica writer Kyle Orland, particularly how Hecate tests Melinoë's strength by serving as the game's first boss. Rolling Stone writers Christopher Cruz and Nikki McCann Ramirez contrasted her character from Zagreus, describing him as a jock while Melinoë was "much more studious, relentlessly disciplined, and overflowing with her own charm." Destructoid writer Gavin Wichmann felt that Melinoë's combat style, which he felt was more versatile than Zagreus' in the previous game, reflected the kind of character Melinoë was. He felt that her backstory of training to defeat Chronos was reflected in how certain moves, such as her Casts, could be used tactically, such as holding enemies in place. Wichmann also felt that Melinoë was unlike Zagreus in several ways, namely how she is more collected, calculating, and careful. Game Rant writer Josh Cotts felt that her differences from Zagreus helped Hades II avoid being in its predecessor's shadow, noting how her sincerity and seriousness helps make her unique.

Her mythological connections have been discussed by critics, with IGN Italy writer Stefano Castagnola stated before the release of Hades II that they should take creative liberties to soften up the aspect of the mythological Melinoë tormenting mortals. ZME Science writer Andrei Mihai discussed the similarities and differences between Melinoë in Hades II and the mythological figure. He noted certain liberties taken with the depiction, arguing that whether the mythological figure was an individual goddess is disputed, as well as whether she was the daughter of Zeus or Hades. The Mary Sue writer Vanessa Esguerra also discussed the Zeus and Hades aspect of the mythological figure's history, appreciating that they chose to take liberties with this and not depict that aspect.
