= Donna J. Fulks =

American actress

- Born: Donna Jay
- Occupations: Actress; voice actress
- Years active: 1987–present
- Spouse: Robbie Fulks
- Website: donnajayfulks.com

Donna Jay Fulks is an American voice actress. She has voiced several characters including Longclaw in Sonic the Hedgehog (2020) and its 2022 sequel, and Mayor Muckford in Sharkdog (2021).

== Personal life ==
Fulks is married to singer-songwriter Robbie Fulks.

== Filmography ==
=== Film ===
Year	Title	Role	Notes
1994	An American Love	N/A	
2020	Sonic the Hedgehog	Longclaw	Voice
2022	Sonic the Hedgehog 2	Longclaw	Voice

=== Television ===
Year	Title	Role	Notes
1987	Biography	Aileen Wuornos	Voice
1996	Early Edition	Doctor	
2010	Detroit 1-8-7	Bailiff	
2012	Chicago Fire	Beleaguered Mom	
2014	Henry Danger	Announcer	Voice
2015	Chicago Med	CDC Lt. Commander Ellen Hart	
2019	South Side	Neighbor 1	
2019	Doom Patrol	Roxy	Voice
2021	Sharkdog	Mayor Muckford	Voice
2022	I Love That for You	SVN	Voice
2022	Paradise PD	Gina Jabowski	Voice
2022	Bee and PuppyCat	Doublemouth	Voice
2024	X-Men '97	Trish Tilby, Tommy, Amelia Voght, additional voices	Voice
