= Sharkdog =

American animated television series

- Genre: Comedy
- Created by: Jacinth Tan Yi Ting
- Directed by: S' Cephas
- Voices of: Dee Bradley Baker; Liam Mitchell; Kari Wahlgren; Meaghan Davies; Aly Mawji; Judy Alice Lee
- Opening theme: "Sharkdog Theme" by Alex Geringas and Drew Seeley
- Composer: Dan Martinez
- Countries of origin: Singapore; United States
- Original language: English
- No. of seasons: 3
- No. of episodes: 22 (59 segments)

Production
- Executive producer: Jacinth Tan Yi Ting
- Producer: John McKenna
- Editors: Wong Ai Koong; Yuyun Garnasih
- Running time: 14–22 minutes (7 minutes per segment)
- Production companies: One Animation; Nickelodeon Animation Studio

Original release
- Network: Netflix
- Release: September 3, 2021 – April 27, 2023

Sharkdog is a children's animated television series. Created by Singaporean artist Jacinth Tan Yi Ting, the series premiered on Netflix on September 3, 2021. A special, titled Sharkdog's Fintastic Halloween, was released on October 15, 2021.

A second season premiered on June 30, 2022 with Jordan Gershowitz taking over as head writer for Ed Valentine. On January 18, 2023, it was announced the series was renewed for a third and final season, that premiered on April 27.

== Premise ==
This show is about ten-year-old Max and his best friend Sharkdog, who is half-shark, half-dog, and all appetite. Blissfully unaware of his own strength, stealth and general sharkiness, Sharkdog often leaves a trail of chaos in his wake.

— Nickelodeon Productions

== Voice cast ==
=== Main ===
- Dee Bradley Baker as Sharkdog (speaking and vocal effects)
- Liam Mitchell as Max
- Grey Griffin as Mom
- Josh McDermitt as Dad
- Kari Wahlgren as Mia
- Aly Mawji as Royce
- Judy Alice Lee as Olivia

=== Villains ===
- Max Mittelman as Brody Ceviche

=== Minor ===
- Meaghan Davies as Annabelle
- Donna J. Fulks as Mayor Muckford
- Jenny Lorenzo as Christina
- Villa Junior Lemanu as Aleki
- Jentel Hawkins as Ms. Williams
- Ian James Corlett as Mr. Heubel
- Liz Burnette as Captain Barb Quigley
- Henry Kaufman as Dennis Muckford
- Kari Wahlgren as Delilah
- Debi Derryberry as Hammerhead Pup and Mega Mouth Pup
- Audrey Wasilewski as Sausage Pup
- Dee Bradley Baker as Smoochers (vocal effects)

== Production ==
The series was originally announced in October 2017, when Nickelodeon ordered its first short-form animated television series from Asia entitled Sharkdog which was based from the short of the same name from Nickelodeon's variety series Nickelodeon Animated Shorts Program, Jacinth Tan and Raihan Harun who partnered on the Nickelodeon short would serve as creators foe the series with multi-award-winning CG animation studio behind Oddbods, One Animation would serve as a production company and would handle animation production servies for the series.

In April 2020, Netflix announced it had partnered with Nickelodeon's fellow production unit ViacomCBS International Studios to produce a full-length animated television series based on the short-form series entitled Sharkdog, marking ViacomCBS International Studios's first global animated television series with One Animation who previously the short-form series had served as a producer as would provide animation production services for Sharkdog.

== Episodes ==
=== Series overview ===
Season	Segments	Episodes	Originally released
1	20	7	September 3, 2021
2	20	7	June 30, 2022
3	19	7	April 27, 2023
Special	0	1	October 15, 2021

=== Season 1 (2021) ===
No. overall	No. in season	Title	Directed by	Written by	Original release date
1a	1a	"Fins in the Water"	Simon Pike & Jacinth Tan Yi Ting	Ed Valentine	September 3, 2021
Max meets Sharkdog and finds a new best friend.
1b	1b	"Home Sweet Sharkdog"	Simon Pike & Jacinth Tan Yi Ting	Ed Valentine	September 3, 2021
Sharkdog's a handful — how will Max keep him a secret?
1c	1c	"Unfetch"	Simon Pike & Jacinth Tan Yi Ting	Itai Grunfeld	September 3, 2021
Sharkdog fetches the wrong things around town.
2a	2a	"Sharkdoghouse"	Simon Pike & Jacinth Tan Yi Ting	Ed Valentine	September 3, 2021
Max calls for back-up from best pals Olivia and Royce.
2b	2b	"Sharkdog Digs In"	Simon Pike & Jacinth Tan Yi Ting	Liz Hara	September 3, 2021
Sharkdog digs out the moles in Max's dad's garden.
2c	2c	"The Great Shark Hunter"	Simon Pike & Jacinth Tan Yi Ting	Ed Valentine	September 3, 2021
Capt. Barb Quigley snatches Sharkdog at sea.
3a	3a	"Sharks Sharks Sharks"	Simon Pike & Jacinth Tan Yi Ting	Michael Rodriguez	September 3, 2021
Sharkdog's the star of the Fisher family’s favorite show.
3b	3b	"Sharkdog Home Alone"	Simon Pike & Jacinth Tan Yi Ting	Ed Valentine	September 3, 2021
Sharkdog makes a mess when he's home alone.
3c	3c	"My Fair Sharkdog"	Simon Pike & Jacinth Tan Yi Ting	Itai Grunfeld	September 3, 2021
Jealous Dennis challenges Max to a doggy contest.
4a	4a	"Shark Marks the Spot"	Simon Pike & Jacinth Tan Yi Ting	Liz Hara	September 3, 2021
Max, Royce and Sharkdog hunt for pirate treasure.
4b	4b	"The Fishers Go Fishing"	Simon Pike & Jacinth Tan Yi Ting	Michael Rodriguez	September 3, 2021
Sharkdog shakes a great white shark away from the Fishers.
4c	4c	"Hide-and-Go-Shark"	Simon Pike & Jacinth Tan Yi Ting	Ed Valentine	September 3, 2021
Sharkdog spooks the fish at the aquarium.
5a	5a	"Green Around the Gills"	Simon Pike & Jacinth Tan Yi Ting	Ed Valentine	September 3, 2021
Sharkdog fakes a cold to keep Max from a camping trip.
5b	5b	"A Storm in Foggy Springs"	Simon Pike & Jacinth Tan Yi Ting	Michael Rodriguez	September 3, 2021
A storm makes Sharkdog camouflage on cue.
5c	5c	"Poots and Vegetables"	Simon Pike & Jacinth Tan Yi Ting	Monique D. Hall	September 3, 2021
Sharkdog's new favorite snack is Brussels sprouts.
6a	6a	"Return of the Nightwalker"	Simon Pike & Jacinth Tan Yi Ting	Itai Grunfeld	September 3, 2021
Sharkdog stops Max from sleepwalking into the ocean.
6b	6b	"Dennis Drones On"	Simon Pike & Jacinth Tan Yi Ting	Liz Hara	September 3, 2021
Max keeps busy to buy a fancy drone for Ollie's birthday.
6c	6c	"The Sharkdogsitter"	Simon Pike & Jacinth Tan Yi Ting	Emma Layden	September 3, 2021
Ollie has a hard time handling Sharkdog.
7a	7a	"Fish Fiesta Freakout"	Simon Pike & Jacinth Tan Yi Ting	Ed Valentine	September 3, 2021
Capt. Quigley, Dennis and Mr. Heubel team up to catch Sharkdog at the carnival.
7b	7b	"Sharkdog, Family"	Simon Pike & Jacinth Tan Yi Ting	Ed Valentine	September 3, 2021
Max comes to the rescue when loyal friend Sharkdog gets in trouble.

=== Special (2021) ===
Title	Directed by	Written by	Original release date
"Sharkdog's Fintastic Halloween"	Simon Pike & Jacinth Tan Yi Ting	Jordan Gershowitz	October 15, 2021
Max and Sharkdog prepare for Halloween by listening to The Legend of the Fearsome Fog. They need to make sure a sea monster does not ruin the party.

=== Season 2 (2022) ===
No. overall	No. in season	Title	Directed by	Written by	Original release date
8a	1a	"The Sharkdog Days of Summer"	Simon Pike & Jacinth Tan Yi Ting	Andy Potter	June 30, 2022
Max and Sharkdog dash home from a beach day to clean up their mess.
8b	1b	"No Fishes in This School"	Simon Pike & Jacinth Tan Yi Ting	Jenava Mie	June 30, 2022
Sharkdog sneaks into the first day of school.
8c	1c	"Going Wild"	Simon Pike & Jacinth Tan Yi Ting	Julia Mayfield Prescott	June 30, 2022
Sharkdog's too wild for the dog park.
9a	2a	"A Not So Grand Opening"	Simon Pike & Jacinth Tan Yi Ting	Jordan Gershowitz	June 30, 2022
Sharkdog snacks on the aquarium's new exhibit.
9b	2b	"The Fast and the Fishy"	S' Cephas & Jacinth Tan Yi Ting	Gloria Shen	June 30, 2022
Max wants to win a race, but Sharkdog gets in the way.
9c	2c	"The Big Picture"	Simon Pike & Jacinth Tan Yi Ting	Annie Nishida	June 30, 2022
Picture day for the Fishers is far from perfect.
10a	3a	"Air Sharkdog"	Simon Pike & Jacinth Tan Yi Ting	Greg Hahn	June 30, 2022
Sharkdog's skills help the Sharkpack on the basketball court.
10b	3b	"Sick as a Sharkdog"	S' Cephas & Jacinth Tan Yi Ting	Aadip Desai	June 30, 2022
The aquarium's robot doctor creates chaos.
10c	3c	"The Sharkdog Scoop"	Simon Pike & Jacinth Tan Yi Ting	Jenava Mie	June 30, 2022
Max's mom spies on Sharkdog to write a story.
11a	4a	"The Party Animal"	Simon Pike & Jacinth Tan Yi Ting	Andy Potter	June 30, 2022
Sharkdog proves he isn't a menace at the town's boardwalk bash.
11b	4b	"Working Like a Sharkdog"	Simon Pike & Jacinth Tan Yi Ting	Julia Mayfield Prescott	June 30, 2022
Sharkdog trails Max's dad for play time.
11c	4c	"Sharkdog's Got Talent"	S' Cephas & Jacinth Tan Yi Ting	Gloria Shen	June 30, 2022
Sharkdog wants the talent show spotlight.
12a	5a	"Meteor Madness"	Simon Pike & Jacinth Tan Yi Ting	Monique D. Hall	June 30, 2022
Capt. Quigley and Sharkdog lead the mountain race to catch a meteor shower.
12b	5b	"Pest Friends Forever"	Simon Pike & Jacinth Tan Yi Ting	Jordan Gershowitz	June 30, 2022
Zombie sea fleas keep Sharkdog super itchy.
12c	5c	"Sleeping Like a Baby"	S' Cephas & Jacinth Tan Yi Ting	Nick Rodriguez	June 30, 2022
Baby sister Mia needs her binky.
13a	6a	"Ceviche for Dinner"	Simon Pike & Jacinth Tan Yi Ting	Annie Nishida	June 30, 2022
Max and Sharkdog try to impress dad's cool boss.
13b	6b	"Surf's Up, Sharkdog!"	S' Cephas & Jacinth Tan Yi Ting	Jordan Gershowitz	June 30, 2022
Dennis and Sharkdog get sticky before a surf meet.
13c	6c	"A Star Fish Is Born"	Simon Pike & Jacinth Tan Yi Ting	Greg Hahn	June 30, 2022
Sharkdog steals the show at a commercial shoot.
14a	7a	"Sharknapped"	Simon Pike & Jacinth Tan Yi Ting	Jenava Mie	June 30, 2022
Something's fishy when Sharkdog doesn't come home, so the Sharkpack sets out to find their friend.
14b	7b	"Sharkdog Makes a Splash"	Simon Pike & Jacinth Tan Yi Ting	Jordan Gershowitz	June 30, 2022
Max and pals try to keep Ceviche on the island.

=== Season 3 (2023) ===
No. overall	No. in season	Title	Directed by	Written by	Original release date
15a	1a	"Sharks, Dogs and Sharkdogs"	S' Cephas	Greg Hahn	April 27, 2023
Sharkdog spends the day on his own.
15b	1b	"Sharkdoggy Day"	S' Cephas	Andy Potter	April 27, 2023
Barb and Sharkdog search for a secret map.
15c	1c	"Fins That Go Bump in the Night"	Simon Pike	Greg Hahn	April 27, 2023
The boys get spooked after watching a scary movie at a sleepover.
16a	2a	"Gnome Is Where the Art Is"	Simon Pike	Annie Nishida	April 27, 2023
Sharkdog tries to help Mr. Heubel win an art contest.
16b	2b	"News Hounds"	Simon Pike	Phillip Walker	April 27, 2023
Max and Sharkdog accidentally delete Mom's news report.
16c	2c	"Sharkdog vs. Sharkdog"	S' Cephas	Sarah Nerboso	April 27, 2023
Mia gets a new favorite Sharkdog.
17a	3a	"All Mapped Out"	S' Cephas	Julia Mayfield	April 27, 2023
The Sharkpack tries to decode a secret map.
17b	3b	"Sharkdog on Ice"	Simon Pike	Jordan Gershowitz	April 27, 2023
Ollie needs to learn how to ice skate... and fast!
17c	3c	"How Barb Got Her Groove Back"	S' Cephas	Jim Nolan	April 27, 2023
Barb is too scared to sail in the cold weather.
18a	4a	"Stranger Fins"	S' Cephas	Andy Potter	April 27, 2023
The Sharkpack arrives on the secret island to search for more Sharkdogs.
18b	4b	"Sharkdog and Mia's Eggcellent Adventure"	Simon Pike	Annie Nishida	April 27, 2023
Mia brings a mysterious egg to school.
18c	4c	"Snow Way Out"	S' Cephas	Nick "Rocket" Rodriguez	April 27, 2023
A Sharkpup crashes Mom's spa day.
19a	5a	"School of Sharkpups"	Simon Pike	Greg Hahn	April 27, 2023
The Sharkpups get loose in Max's school.
19b	5b	"How to Train Your Sharkpups"	S' Cephas	Aadip Desai	April 27, 2023
Max and Sharkdog compete to see who's a better Sharkpup trainer.
19c	5c	"Sharkbites and Pupcakes"	Simon Pike	Sarah Nerboso	April 27, 2023
Max bets Dennis he can sell more dog treats.
20a	6a	"Puptown Funk"	Simon Pike	Annie Nishida	April 27, 2023
What's causing the pups to go into Sharkmode?
20b	6b	"Pup, Pup and Away"	S' Cephas	Julia Mayfield	April 27, 2023
The Sharkpups are running wild in Foggy Springs!
20c	6c	"Sharks on a Boat"	Simon Pike	Jim Nolan	April 27, 2023
Barb and Dad help the Sharkpack wrangle the Sharkpups.
21	7	"Return to the Island"	S' Cephas	Andy Potter	April 27, 2023
The Sharkpack, Barb and Dad embark on an exciting adventure to return the Sharkpups to their island. But will the team make it home in one piece?

== Release ==
Sharkdog was released on Netflix on 3 September 2021.
