= Yun Jin =

Fictional character in a video game

- Genshin Impact character
- First game: Genshin Impact (2022)
- Voiced by: English: Judy Alice Lee; Yang Yang (song vocals); Chinese: He Wenxiao; Yang Yang (song vocals); Japanese: Kotori Koiwai; Yang Yang (song vocals); Korean: Sa Moon-young; Yang Yang (song vocals)

In-universe information
- Weapon: Polearm
- Origin: Liyue
- Element: Geo

Yun Jin (Chinese: 云堇; pinyin: Yún Jǐn) is a character from Genshin Impact, a 2020 action role-playing gacha game developed by miHoYo. The character was officially released in version 2.4 of the game on January 5, 2022. In the game, Yun Jin is a famous figure in the opera scene in the fictional country of Liyue. She is the director of the Yun-Han Opera Troupe and is also a playwright. The character's English voice actor is Judy Alice Lee, the Chinese voice actor is He Wenxiao, the Japanese voice actor is Kotori Koiwai, and the Korean voice actor is Sa Moon-young. Yun Jin's dialogue and singing segments in Liyue opera are performed by Yang Yang.

Yun Jin's character prototype is based on a Peking opera performer, with the development team aiming to promote traditional Chinese opera through her character and to generate interest in opera among players. To achieve this, miHoYo decided to retain the voice acting and singing segments performed by Yang Yang in languages other than Chinese. In the game's 2.4 update, a video showcasing Yun Jin performing the Peking opera piece The Divine Damsel of Devastation attracted players from various regions to take interest in Chinese opera. It also inspired a group of first-class performers related to opera and musical instruments to undertake secondary creative works based on The Divine Damsel of Devastation. Chinese media positively reviewed the character, acknowledging her role in promoting traditional Chinese art.

== Design and voice acting ==
When Dou, one of the main creators of Genshin Impact, talked about the original concept behind Yun Jin, he explained that while building Liyue Harbor, the team wanted to create an "artist" character — someone who symbolizes the city's rich everyday cultural life. Inspired by the real world, they looked to traditional Chinese opera and, from that, came up with Yun Jin. To fit Liyue's worldbuilding, the developers blended elements of Chinese opera into an original, fictional form called "Liyue Opera," with Yun Jin positioned as one of its performers. The team did a deep dive into traditional opera to draw inspiration, hoping that reinterpreting these traditions in a fresh way would spark people's interest in the culture. Yun Jin's entire design revolves around opera elements, and the team even sought out a real opera instructor to perform her vocal pieces. As for her personality, Dou described her as someone who carries both a sense of heritage and a drive for innovation. Although she is a traditional opera worker, Yun Jin is also eager to accept new things to broaden her horizons and even has a keen interest in rock music. In the animated cutscene The Divine Damsel of Devastation, after Yun Jin finishes singing the original version (神女劈观; Shénnǚ pī guān) based on the regional characteristics of Liyue's "human governance", she sings an additional section inspired by Liyue's "human governance" philosophy, as well as her experiences with the protagonist Traveler and Shenhe during their battle against a sea monster, reflecting Yun Jin's innovative spirit.

=== Character design ===
Yun Jin wears a headdress adorned with seven stars, draped in cloud-like shoulders and a battle skirt, incorporating elements of theatrical stage design. Because Yun Jin's attire is her everyday outfit rather than a theatrical costume, the original illustrator, Weiwei, mentioned that when designing Yun Jin, they did not rigidly adhere to the traditional image of a "theater performer". Instead, they drew inspiration from the appearances of Hua Mulan, Mu Guiying, and Liang Hongyu in traditional Chinese opera. Considering Yun Jin's youthful setting and personality, they designed attire that includes theatrical elements but differs in style from the traditional ones. Her attire meanwhile was designed as a half skirt to avoid issues with her 3D character model when animating it.

The 3D model of Yun Jin was completed in 2018, but the final product did not meet expectations. As a result, the original illustrator and modeling team went through a period of iteration and polishing. During this time, the modeling team encountered several technical challenges, which they gradually overcame. They mentioned that the original design did not initially consider the virtual camera within the game, especially regarding Yun Jin's elaborate headwear design, which could lead to distortion. To address this, the modeling team submitted a request to the tooling team, hoping to develop a tool that could synchronize Maya and the game engine in real-time, allowing them to see the final visual effects of the model in the actual game environment instantly. The successful development of this tool greatly facilitated communication between the original illustrator and the modeling team and accelerated development work.

Yun Jin's character design differs from other characters in Genshin Impact in many ways. The accessories she wears posed several challenges in terms of animation design. Her heavy eye shadow required special attention even for blinking animations. To achieve a richer cartoon rendering effect, the modeling team developed a dynamic facial shadow texture system, making the transition of facial lighting effects appear more natural and stable. Yun Jin's character rendering underwent multiple iterations, including the addition of dynamic self-shadowing, scene dynamic projection, scene lighting sources, and the effect of mist, allowing the character to better blend into the scene. Performance limitations caused some effects not to be shown on mobile devices.

Yun Jin's performance animations and skills also reference theatrical culture, such as incorporating acrobatic movements from traditional Chinese opera and martial arts into her spear-dancing performance, derived from her skill "Opening Flourish" (飞云旗阵; 'Flying Clouds Formation'), which is inspired by Beijing Opera costumes. Li Xiaoxiong and Shao You, the animation producers of the game, mentioned that to showcase Yun Jin's unique temperament, the animation team extensively studied theatrical culture. They ultimately decided to shape Yun Jin's character using the signature movement "appearance" from traditional Chinese opera. "Appearance" is the movement actors make when entering or leaving the stage. The animation team designed each of Yun Jin's combat animations as a "dramatic performance", incorporating elements like the "Solo Sword Appearance" and "Dual Sword Appearance" into her regular attack animations. They also made detailed adjustments to the Appearance movements and rhythm to suit Yun Jin's girlish temperament. For Yun Jin's elemental skill design, the animation team referenced the "spin" movement commonly seen in opera and martial arts. Through Yun Jin's idle animation design, the animation team aimed to showcase her character's personality. They drew inspiration from the acrobatic skill "striking out" in theatrical martial arts, originally requiring multiple people to perform, but modified it to be executed by Yun Jin alone.

=== Voice acting ===
The audio production for Yun Jin and the creation of The Divine Damsel of Devastation took only one month. Due to Yun Jin's voice acting involving operatic content, the production team made the first attempt to have voice actors He Wenxiao and opera performer Yang Yang respectively perform the character's lines and singing segments in Chinese, aiming to retain the characteristics of opera. Before Yun Jin's appearance, character voice acting in various language versions of Genshin Impact had undergone localization. However, due to the difficulty of adapting Yun Jin's singing segments, which represent Chinese opera, miHoYo decided to retain Yang Yang's singing segments in the original Chinese instead of dubbing them. (Note: Yang Yang is a Hua Dan performer of the Xun Group at the Shanghai Jingju Theatre Company, is the winner of the "Leading Actress Award" at the 29th Shanghai Magnolia Drama Performance Awards.)

Yang Yang considers voicing Yun Jin to be a very fresh and interesting experience and hopes that the integration of drama and the virtual world can expose more people to and deepen their understanding of opera. During the production of The Divine Damsel of Devastation, the production team found that Yang Yang was not familiar with traditional music notation, so they adapted the music notation to a simplified version to accommodate her. The Divine Damsel of Devastation has more elements of rock and electric guitar in the demo, and adjustments were made during actual recording. The production team also listened to Yang Yang's feedback to make the final product's opera style more prominent. For the spoken parts of The Divine Damsel of Devastation, originally intended for Yang Yang to imitate He Wenxiao's voice, the team ultimately decided to use Jingbai from Peking opera, which is not uncommon in traditional opera, for dialogue with the audience. This setting is also present in traditional opera and does not seem out of place. In the Japanese version, the voice acting is done by Kotori Koiwai, who expressed joy at being able to voice Yun Jin due to her passion for acting, music, and creation.

== Appearances ==
In the fictional world of Genshin Impact, the continent of Teyvat is home to the bustling, culturally vibrant port city of Liyue Harbor in Liyue. Yun Jin is a local opera-performing artist and a bearer of the traditional art of "Liyue Opera," skilled in both its composition and performance. In the game's story, she pushes the boundaries of this traditional art form, shifting its themes from tales of archons and adepti to stories centered on the lives of ordinary people.

Yun Jin comes from a long-established family of performing arts. Her mother was a renowned actress in Liyue Harbor, and her father an opera playwright. Influenced by her family, Yun Jin studied Liyue Opera from a young age. As an adult, she inherited her grandfather's mantle and became the head of the Yun-Han Opera Troupe, taking charge of its affairs both big and small. Because of this, merchants respectfully call her "Ms. Yun."

Following the release of Version 2.4 Fleeting Colors in Flight in Genshin Impact, players can obtain Yun Jin through the game's gacha system or choose to invite her to join their team after meeting certain conditions during the annual Lantern Rite event. In combat, Yun Jin is a support character reliant on defense, providing buffs to team members to increase their damage dealt to enemies and monsters. Her elemental skill releases a protective shield and provides a Geo element bonus to attacks. Her elemental burst "Cliffbreaker's Banner" increases the damage dealt by all characters in the team based on Yun Jin's defense for a duration.

== Promotion and reception ==
In the "Moonchase Festival" event introduced in version 2.1 of Genshin Impact, Yun Jin already appeared as a cameo character in the event introduction animation. Fans had anticipated her debut in the next 2.2 version of the game. On November 22, 2021, miHoYo revealed her character illustration. It was disclosed that Yun Jin would be the second Geo element character in Genshin Impact to use a polearm as a weapon, with her character based on a Peking opera performer. In December, Yun Jin also appeared in the ending of the video for Genshin Impact nominated for The Game Awards, with the character's official introduction in a preview live stream for the game's 2.4 version. On January 5, 2022, the 2.4 version of Genshin Impact titled Fleeting Colors in Flight was officially launched, and in the new version's animated cutscene, Yun Jin performed a segment of The Divine Damsel of Devastation with Peking opera singing, integrating elements of opera into the game, which attracted widespread attention. Later, on January 14, miHoYo released a dedicated interview program specifically introducing Yun Jin's character design.

When miHoYo announced the character design on November 22, 2021, Yun Jin briefly trended as the second-most-discussed topic on Twitter. After her appearance in the preview livestream for Version 2.4 in December, Yun Jin garnered widespread attention once again. The hashtag "#原神云堇" on Weibo accumulated millions of views, and Yun Jin's tag briefly reached the fifth position on Twitter trends. Yun Jin's performance of a traditional opera segment during her debut sparked discussions among fans. Some fans expressed surprise and mockery towards this performance, while others pointed out that it is a unique art form within Chinese culture and should not be prejudiced against.

In January, miHoYo released the story teaser The Divine Damsel of Devastation for the new version of Genshin Impact, which featured Yun Jin's opera performance throughout. As the production team retained the original opera singing in versions other than Chinese, it piqued the curiosity of some non-Chinese players about opera culture. China Global Television Network's YouTube channel experienced a short-term increase of over 100,000 views on their Peking opera videos due to the influence of The Divine Damsel of Devastation, with viewers commenting that they were drawn by Yun Jin's performance.

After the release of The Divine Damsel of Devastation video on Bilibili, it garnered 3 million views within 12 hours. Yun Jin's performance also prompted some professional opera enthusiasts to analyze and educate about it. Xue Jian, the Consul General of the Chinese Consulate in Osaka at the time, liked the tweet about The Divine Damsel of Devastation on Twitter, describing it as "extremely beautiful". Subsequently, The Divine Damsel of Devastation sparked some cover songs and derivative works. It also attracted coverage from media outlets such as China News Service, Xinhua News Agency, and People's Daily. Chinese actors attempted to reinterpret The Divine Damsel of Devastation for the second time, such as Zeng Xiaomin, director of the Guangdong Cantonese Opera Theatre, who reinterpreted it in the style of Cantonese opera, gaining over 3.5 million views. Additionally, figures from Peking opera, Huai opera, and suona performance showcased their own interpretations of The Divine Damsel of Devastation. The popularity of The Divine Damsel of Devastation also stimulated some opera enthusiasts' reflections. Qiu Danli, from the Shanghai Yue Opera Theater, performed The Divine Damsel of Devastation in the style of Yue opera, garnering millions of views, significantly higher than previous Yue opera videos. She believes that opera can be combined with animation, attempting to bring game characters onto the opera stage.

A week after the release of The Divine Damsel of Devastation, the video's views on Genshin Impact's Bilibili and YouTube English channels surpassed 9.4 million and 2.1 million, respectively. miHoYo's CEO, Liu Wei, expressed "great joy" at the warm reception of The Divine Damsel of Devastation by players worldwide. He also remarked: "taking traditional elements as the foundation, understanding and absorbing new cultural elements, interpreting traditional content in innovative ways, arousing the audience's enthusiasm for traditional culture—this is not only Yun Jin's wish but also our expectation as game content creators".

Kotaku's Chinese-American editor, Sisi Jiang, pointed out that when Yun Jin first performed opera on December 26, players' reactions to this character varied. Some enjoyed Yun Jin's performance, while others were displeased. Jiang believes that Peking opera is a niche art form in mainland China, and its development stagnated during the Cultural Revolution. Jiang initially thought Peking opera was unsuitable for cultural exportation. However, after the trailer for the game was released, The Divine Damsel of Devastation sparked significant interest among players in Peking opera, which was unexpected. Promoting Peking opera domestically in mainland China is also challenging, but Genshin Impact, through The Divine Damsel of Devastation and Yun Jin, has aroused global interest in Peking opera. This demonstrates that popular video games can lead mainstream culture rather than just following trends.

Chen Weijun, Vice Dean of the Cultural Industry Development Research Institute at Jinan University, believes that miHoYo's promotion of traditional Chinese opera through the game character Yun Jin is "a relatively good case of cultural international dissemination". Tan Qunzhao, former CEO of Shengqu Games, believes that "Her (Yun Jin's) attire incorporates a lot of operatic elements and is a symbol of Chinese traditional culture".
