= Gateway (character) =

- Gateway from Generation X #7. Art by Roger Cruz.

Publication information
- Publisher: Marvel Comics
- First appearance: The Uncanny X-Men #229 (May 1988)
- Created by: Chris Claremont; Marc Silvestri

In-story information
- Species: Human mutant
- Team affiliations: X-Men; Generation X Reavers
- Abilities: Dimensional travel; Clairvoyance; Telepathy

Gateway is a superhero appearing in American comic books published by Marvel Comics. The character has been depicted as an Australian mutant with the ability to teleport objects and people from one location to another. He is considered an unofficial member of the X-Men.

== Publication history ==
Gateway first appeared in The Uncanny X-Men #229 (May 1988), and was created by Chris Claremont and Marc Silvestri.

== Fictional character biography ==
Much of Gateway's past remains a mystery, including his name and place of birth. He is an Aboriginal Australian man who appears to have grown up in the Outback.

He served the criminal group the Reavers in repayment for an undisclosed favor they did him. As extra assurance of his loyalty, they threaten to destroy an Aboriginal holy place if he betrays them. They call him "Gateway" in reference to his ability to create gateways between two points in space. Some time later, the X-Men appear in the Outback and attack the Reavers' headquarters. Though Gateway helps the Reavers Skullbuster, Bonebreaker, and Pretty Boy escape, the X-Men realize that he is not affiliated with them. The X-Men take up residence in the Reavers' former hideout, and Gateway begins voluntarily using his powers to assist them.

Gateway later appears at the Xavier Institute in Massachusetts, where Generation X is training, with a young girl. When he encounters Banshee, he simply speaks the word, "Penance", which is assumed to be the girl's name. Gateway appears sporadically around Generation X for some time, often in the presence of the St. Croix twins Nicole and Claudette.

Gateway is among the few mutants to have retained his powers after M-Day, when the Scarlet Witch removed the powers of most mutants on Earth.

It is revealed to Iceman and Cannonball that Gateway was one of the targeted mutants the Marauders were killing, due to his powers giving him the ability to see into the future. Gateway survives the assassination attempt and becomes a mentor to Eden Fesi, who possesses similar teleportation abilities to his.

Fantomex is murdered by Skinless Man, severing the connection between him and Ultimaton. Ultimaton returns to his basic Sentinel programming to kill all mutants and snaps Gateway's neck before exploding. Psylocke is able to use her telepathic powers to allow Gateway to create one last portal before dying and save X-Force. Long after his death, Gateway is resurrected following the establishment of Krakoa as a mutant nation and joins S.W.O.R.D.

== Powers and abilities ==
Gateway is a mutant with the ability to create wormholes which allow travel through space, time and dimensions. He channels his powers using a bullroarer. No limits have been shown to Gateway's teleportational range or the mass he can transport. He has, for example, transported the X-Men from Australia to the United States and back using his powers, as well as transporting them trans-dimensionally to another Earth. In addition, Gateway is able to enter and manipulate the dreams of others.

== Other versions ==
An alternate universe version of Gateway appears in "Age of Revelation" as a member of Rogue's X-Force.

== In other media ==
- Gateway appears in X-Men: The Ravages of Apocalypse.
- Gateway appears in X-Men Legends.
- Gateway appears in Marvel Heroes. He is based in the Xavier Institute and allows the player to replay previous chapters of the game.

== Reception ==
Gateway is ranked as one of Marvel Comics greatest teleporters and the X-Men's greatest allies.
