= Skullbuster =

Marvel supervillains

- The original Skullbuster. From Uncanny X-Men #248 (September 1989). Art by Jim Lee.

Publication information
- Publisher: Marvel Comics
- First appearance: Original Skullbuster: Uncanny X-Men #229 (May 1988); Cylla Markham: Uncanny X-Men #260 (April 1990); Third Skullbuster: X-Treme X-Men Annual 2001 (February 2002)
- Created by: Chris Claremont; Marc Silvestri; Salvador Larroca

In-story information
- Alter ego: First Skullbuster: Unknown; Second Skullbuster: Cylla Markham; Third Skullbuster: Unknown
- Species: Human cyborg
- Team affiliations: Reavers
- Abilities: Cybernetic body; Robotic weaponry

Skullbuster is the name of three supervillains appearing in American comic books published by Marvel Comics. The original Skullbuster first appeared in Uncanny X-Men #229 (May 1988) and was created by Chris Claremont and Marc Silvestri.

== Fictional character biography ==
=== Original Skullbuster ===
The first Skullbuster is a member of the original Reavers, a gang of cyborgs living in a ghost town in Australia who perpetrate robberies across the globe. Skullbuster, as well as Pretty Boy and Bonebreaker, escape after their defeat by the X-Men. Under the leadership of Donald Pierce, the remaining Reavers train to defeat the X-Men. The Reavers ambush Wolverine, beat him half to death, and crucify him. After Wolverine escapes, the Reavers attack Muir Island, where Skullbuster is shot and seemingly killed by Forge.

Skullbuster is not seen again for several years, and Pierce recruits Cylla Markham as the new Skullbuster. Pierce later states that he resurrected Skullbuster by copying his cybernetic mainframe.

=== Cylla Markham ===
Cylla Markham, a pilot, is hired by Banshee and Forge to aid in finding their missing teammates, but they get a lead on Dazzler being in Hollywood and tell her they will not need the flight. She does not mind as long as she is still going to be paid, and takes off, but the plane is shot down by Fenris as Banshee and Forge look on. Cylla survives, but is grievously injured and hospitalized. Donald Pierce visits Cylla, noting she will never walk or fly again, and offers to make her a cyborg in exchange for taking down Wolverine, to which she agrees. After extensive modification, she joins Pierce's Reavers.

While she is replacing the original Skullbuster, Cylla mainly goes by her real name. Skullbuster attempts to kill Wolverine, but is defeated by Jubilee and Yukio. With Pierce gone, Cylla is unable to have her injuries from the battle repaired and allies with Bloodscream against Wolverine. However, Bloodscream betrays her and appears to suck her life force.

Cylla survives Bloodscream's attack and takes a high-paying mission from an anonymous individual to recover Wolverine's remains from his burial site. Whilst the other Reavers fight, Donald Pierce and Cylla attempt to open the adamantium casing, which they believe to contain Wolverine's remains. After opening the casing, they are bewildered to find it empty, with Kitty Pryde having taken Wolverine's body elsewhere.

Operating as an independent mercenary, Cylla is later hired by Hawthorne Ryan, a tech billionaire, and faces off against the young novice hero Escapade (Shela Sexton), who breaches Ryan's base in search of an artefact. Although she successfully injures Escapade, Cylla is defeated by her opponent's power of "switching circumstances", meaning she ends up with all the damage she had inflicted.

=== Third Skullbuster ===
An unidentified female Skullbuster appears as a new member of the Reavers. Alongside the rest of the team, she battles the X-Men and attempts to drain Thunderbird's solar plasma energy until Bishop intervenes. Skullbuster is ultimately defeated and imprisoned alongside the other Reavers.

== Powers and abilities ==
Like the other members of the Reavers, the original Skullbuster is a cyborg and has bionic implants that augment his strength, stamina, leaping, and reflexes beyond the levels of a normal human.

Skullbuster possesses infrared optic scanners, an on-board targeting computer, a plasma grenade launcher, machine guns, steel wrist claws, a plasma blaster, and thermite launchers. His implants also allow him to absorb energy from attacks and power sources.

The Cylla Markham incarnation of Skullbuster possesses much of the same cyberntic enhancements as the original, but she wields claws made of laminated steel.

== In other media ==
Skullbuster appears in Marvel's Wolverine. This version is a mercenary and founding member of the Reavers.
