= CP System =

Arcade system board developed by Capcom

- Manufacturer: Capcom
- Type: Arcade system board
- Released: May 13, 1988
- Discontinued: May 11, 1995
- CPU: Motorola 68000 (@ 10 MHz)
- Display: Raster, 384 × 224 pixels (horizontal), 4096 colors
- Input: 8-way joystick, from 3 to 6 buttons
- Successor: CP System II

The CP System (CPシステム, CP shisutemu), also known as Capcom Play System or CPS for short (and retroactively as CPS-1), is an arcade system board developed by Capcom that ran game software stored on removable daughterboards. More than two dozen arcade titles were released for CPS-1, before Capcom shifted game development over to its successor, the CP System II. Technical support for the CPS-1 ended on March 31, 2015.

The CP System is best known for its many brawlers (beat 'em up) genre titles such as the Top 5 which are Captain Commando, Dynasty Wars, Final Fight, Knights of the Round, and The King of Dragons. Then later on for the CP System Dash successor including Cadillacs and Dinosaurs, The Punisher, and the sequel to Dynasty Wars titled Warriors of Fate.

== History ==
The development of the CP System hardware began in 1986 when Capcom president Kenzo Tsujimoto came up with the concept inspired by the success of the Nintendo Entertainment System (NES), known domestically as the Family Computer (Famicom). He saw the rise of home video games as competition for the arcades, and stated that "the only way we can make money is to give people twice what they can get at home". After a number of arcade game boards designed to run only one game, Capcom also embarked upon a project to produce a system board that could be used to run multiple games, in order to reduce hardware costs and make the system more appealing to arcade operators.

Capcom developed the hardware for about two-and-a-half years, during which time they developed two custom microchips known as the "CPS Super Chips", which were equivalent to the power of ten normal arcade boards at the time. The two chips cost around £5,500,000 or $9,800,000 (equivalent to $27,000,000 in 2025) to develop, and also served as the graphics hardware of the system.

The system was plagued by many bootleg versions of its games. In particular, there were so many bootleg versions of Street Fighter II that they were more common in some countries than the official version. This problem was virtually eliminated by Capcom in the later CP System II.

The CP System hardware was also utilized in Capcom's unsuccessful attempt at home console market penetration, the Capcom Power System Changer (or CPS Changer), a domestic version of the CP System similar to the Neo Geo AES.

Capcom ceased production of the CP System hardware on May 11, 1995; however, new software continued to be released for the hardware as late as 2000. Capcom ended technical support for the CP System hardware and its games on March 31, 2015.

== Technical specifications ==
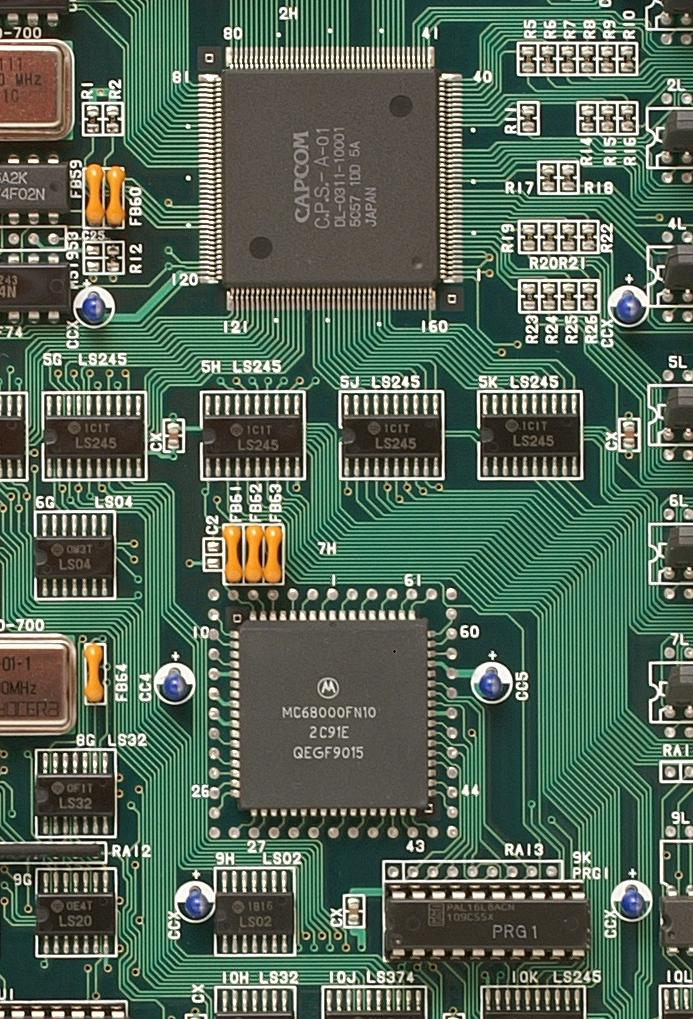
CP System's 10 MHz 68000 CPU and graphics IC

- CPU:
  - Primary: Motorola 68000 @ 10 MHz (some later boards 12 MHz)
  - Secondary: Zilog Z80 @ 3.579 MHz
- Co-processors: 2x CPS Super Chip
- Sound chips:
  - Yamaha YM2151 @ 3.579 MHz
  - Oki OKI6295 @ 1 MHz (7.576 kHz samples)
- Display
  - Resolution: Raster, 384×224 @ 59.6294 Hz
  - Color depth: 16-bit (12-bit RGB with 4-bit brightness value)
  - Colors available: 65,536
  - Onscreen colors: 4096 (192 global palettes with 16 colors each)
- Sprites:
  - Simultaneously displayable: 256 (per scanlines)
  - Sizes: 16×16, max. 16 colors (15 unique + 1 transparent)
  - Vertical and horizontal flipping capability
- Tiles: Sizes 8×8, 16×16, 32×32 with 16 colors (15 unique + 1 transparent)
- Tile maps: 3 maps, 512×512, 1024×1024, 2048×2048 pixel
- RAM:
  - 68000: 64 KB WORK RAM + 192 KB VRAM (Shadow)
  - Z80: 2 KB WORK RAM
  - PPU: 192 KB VRAM + 16 KB CACHE RAM

== List of games (32 games) ==
English title	Release date	Developer	Japanese title	Genre
Forgotten Worlds	May 13, 1988	Capcom	Lost Worlds (ロストワールド)	Shoot 'em up
Ghouls'n Ghosts	December 1988	Capcom	Daimakaimura (大魔界村)	Platform
Strider	March 1989	Capcom	Strider Hiryū (ストライダー飛竜)	Platformer
Dynasty Wars	April 1989	Capcom	Tenchi o Kurau (天地を喰らう)	Beat 'em up
Willow	June 1989	Capcom	Willow (ウィロー)	Platform
U.N. Squadron	August 1989	Capcom	Area 88 (エリア88)	Shoot 'em up
Final Fight	December 1, 1989	Capcom	Final Fight (ファイナルファイト)	Beat 'em up
1941: Counter Attack	February 1990	Capcom	1941 (1941)	Shoot 'em up
Mercs	March 2, 1990	Capcom	Senjō no Ōkami II (戦場の狼II)	Run and gun
Mega Twins	June 19, 1990	Capcom	Chiki Chiki Boys (チキチキボーイズ)	Platform
Magic Sword - Heroic Fantasy	June 23, 1990	Capcom	Magic Sword (マジックソード)	Platform
Carrier Air Wing	October 9, 1990	Capcom	U.S. Navy (U.S.NAVY)	Shoot 'em up
Nemo	November 20, 1990	Capcom	Nemo (ニモ)	Platformer
Street Fighter II: The World Warrior	February 6, 1991	Capcom	Street Fighter II: The World Warrior (ストリートファイターII -The World Warrior-)	Head-to-head fighting
Three Wonders	May 20, 1991	Capcom	Wonder 3 (ワンダー3)	Multi-game
The King of Dragons	July 11, 1991	Capcom	The King of Dragons (ザ・キングオブドラゴンズ)	Beat 'em up
Captain Commando	September 28, 1991	Capcom	Captain Commando (キャプテンコマンドー)	Beat 'em up
Knights of the Round	November 27, 1991	Capcom	Knights of the Round (ナイツオブザラウンド)	Beat 'em up
Street Fighter II: Champion Edition	March 13, 1992	Capcom	Street Fighter II (Dash): Champion Edition (ストリートファイターIIダッシュ -Champion Edition-)	Head-to-head fighting
Adventure Quiz: Capcom World 2	June 11, 1992	Capcom	Adventure Quiz Capcom World 2 (アドベンチャークイズカプコンワールド2)	Quiz game
Varth: Operation Thunderstorm	June 12, 1992	Capcom	Varth: Operation Thunderstorm (バース -オペレーションサンダーストーム-)	Shoot 'em up
Quiz & Dragons: Capcom Quiz Game	July 1, 1992	Capcom	Quiz & Dragons (クイズ&ドラゴンズ)	Quiz game
Street Fighter II: Hyper Fighting	December 9, 1992	Capcom	Street Fighter II (Dash) Turbo: Hyper Fighting (ストリートファイターIIダッシュターボ -Hyper Fighting-)	Head-to-head fighting
Pokonyan! Balloon	March 22, 1994	Capcom	Pokonyan! Balloon (ポコニャン！バルーン)	Kiddie ride
Ken Sei Mogura: Street Fighter II	April 18, 1994	Capcom/Togo/Sigma	Ken Sei Mogura (拳聖土竜)	Whack a mole
Pnickies	June 8, 1994	Capcom/Compile	Pnickies (ぷにっきいず)	Puzzle
Quiz Tonosama no Yabō 2: Zenkoku-ban	January 23, 1995	Capcom	Quiz Tonosama no Yabō 2: Zenkoku-ban (クイズ 殿様の野望2 全国版)	Quiz game
Buster Buddies	May 11, 1995	Capcom/Mitchell Corporation	Pang! 3 (パン3)	Platformer
Mega Man: The Power Battle	October 6, 1995	Capcom	Rockman: The Power Battle (ロックマン ザ・パワーバトル)	Action
Magical Pumpkin	October 31, 1995	Capcom	Magical Pumpkin (マジカルパンプキン)	Kiddie ride
Ganbare! Marine Kun	April 11, 2000	Capcom	Ganbare! Marine Kun (がんばれ!マリン君)	Redemption
Gulun.Pa!	Unreleased	Capcom	Gulun.Pa! (グルンパ!)	Puzzle

== CP System Dash ==
CP System Dash
- A CPS-1.5 board
- Manufacturer: Capcom
- Type: Arcade system board
- Released: February 1, 1992
- Discontinued: December 6, 1993
- CPU: Motorola 68000 (@ 10 MHz)
- Display: Raster, 384 × 224 pixels (horizontal), 3072 colors
- Sound: Sound CPU: "Kabuki" Z80 (@ 8 MHz); Q-Sound (@ 4 MHz)
- Input: 8-way joystick, from 3 to 6 buttons

A year before releasing the CP System II, Capcom released an enhanced version of the original CP System dubbed the CP System Dash, which had some features that would later be used in the CP System II, such as the QSound chips. The CP System Dash boards have four interlocking PCBs contained in gray plastic boxes; the concept of enclosing arcade PCBs in a special plastic enclosure would later be used for the CP System II hardware.

To combat piracy, "suicide batteries" were implemented, which power the volatile RAM which contained the manual configuration of the display hardware registers, as well as the priorities registers. If the batteries' voltage drops below +2V, the registers manually defined in factory by Capcom in RAM would be lost, and the PPU would no longer have access to the hardware specific register set on the game used. This renders the game inoperable, necessitating the operator sending the board to Capcom to be fixed at their own expense. Unlike the CP System II, the CP System Dash sound ROMs were encrypted using "Kabuki" Z80s. The CP System Dash 68000 code is not encrypted at all.

=== List of games (5 games) ===
All five games are developed and published by Capcom.

English title	Release date	Japanese title	Genre
Warriors of Fate; Sangokushi II (Asia)	October 2, 1992	Tenchi o Kurau II: Sekiheki no Tatakai (天地を喰らう2・赤壁の戦い)	Beat 'em up
Cadillacs and Dinosaurs	February 1, 1993	Cadillacs Kyōryū Shinseiki (キャディラックス 恐竜新世紀)	Beat 'em up
The Punisher	April 22, 1993	The Punisher (パニッシャー)	Beat 'em up
Saturday Night Slam Masters	July 13, 1993	Muscle Bomber: The Body Explosion (マッスルボマー -The Body Explosion-)	Sports game
Muscle Bomber Duo: Ultimate Team Battle	December 6, 1993	Muscle Bomber Duo: Heat Up Warriors (マッスルボマーDUO -Heat Up Warriors-)	Sports game

== Capcom Power System Changer ==
A CPS Changer game (Street Fighter Zero)

A home video game console version of the CP System, the Capcom Power System Changer (or CPS Changer), was released in late 1994 in Japan to compete with SNK's Neo Geo AES. It was Capcom's attempt at selling their arcade games in a home-friendly format.

The CPS Changer was sold as a package deal containing the console itself, one CPS Fighter joystick controller, and Street Fighter II (Dash) Turbo for 39,800 yen. Additional games were sold for about 20,000 yen. Upon its release in November 1994, Capcom initially manufactured only 1,000 units in Japan.

The CPS Changer's adapter was basically an encased SuperGun (i.e. Television JAMMA adapter), and was compatible with most JAMMA standard PCBs. Capcom's "protection" against people using the CPS Changer on other arcade boards was the physical shape of the device. On a normal JAMMA PCB, it would not attach firmly and would lean at odd angles, but it would work. The CPS Changer has outputs for composite video, S-video and line-level mono audio. The CPS Changer also featured Super Famicom/Super NES controller ports, allowing the use of all Super Famicom/Super NES controllers, including their own six-button joystick, the "CPS Fighter".

All of the CPS Changer games used the CP System arcade hardware. The CPS Changer games were simply arcade PCBs in a special plastic shell suitable for home use; a concept that was previously done with the CP System II hardware a year prior. The plastic shells are identical to those used in CP System Dash games. Some CPS-1 games were changed slightly for home release, sometimes including debugging features or other easter eggs.

The final game for the CPS Changer was a backported version of Street Fighter Zero (also known as Street Fighter Alpha) in 1995, originally released for the CP System II hardware. This port, released at a premium 35,000 yen in 1996, was downgraded slightly for the system's less capable hardware: it ran at a slightly slower frame rate, had a lower color depth and palette, a different soundtrack generated by the system's sound chips, fewer sound effects, and the music and sound effects being sampled at a lower rate.

The CPS Changer version of Street Fighter Zero also had a limited release overseas in the arcades for publicity testing purposes (being released as Street Fighter Alpha for those regions) where it was distributed as a standard CP System release, especially to those who could not afford the upgrade to the CP System II hardware. Another CP System II game that was backported around the same timeframe, Rockman: The Power Battle (also known as Mega Man: The Power Battle), also received similar changes when it was ported to the CP System hardware (but not the CPS Changer, as no new releases for it were made after Street Fighter Zero), and it too had limited releases in the arcades much like the publicity test versions of Street Fighter Zero for the CPS Changer.

=== List of games (11 games) ===
All 11 games were developed and published by Capcom. Most games on this list ran on CP System hardware, while some ran on CP System Dash hardware.

English title	Release date	Japanese title	Genre
Warriors of Fate; Sangokushi II (Asia)	1994	Tenchi o Kurau II: Sekiheki no Tatakai (天地を喰らう2・赤壁の戦い)	Beat 'em up
Capcom World 2: Adventure Quiz	1994	Adventure Quiz Capcom World 2 (アドベンチャークイズカプコンワールド2)	Quiz game
Captain Commando	1995	Captain Commando (キャプテンコマンドー)	Beat 'em up
Final Fight	1994	Final Fight (ファイナルファイト)	Beat 'em up
Knights of the Round	1995	Knights of the Round (ナイツオブザラウンド)	Beat 'em up
Muscle Bomber Duo: Ultimate Team Battle	1995	Muscle Bomber Duo: Heat Up Warriors (マッスルボマーDUO -Heat Up Warriors-)	Sports game
Saturday Night Slam Masters	1994	Muscle Bomber: The Body Explosion (マッスルボマー -The Body Explosion-)	Sports game
Street Fighter II: Champion Edition	1994	Street Fighter II Dash: Champion Edition (ストリートファイターIIダッシュ -Champion Edition-)	Versus Fighting
Street Fighter II Turbo: Hyper Fighting	1994, pack-in	Street Fighter II Dash Turbo: Hyper Fighting (ストリートファイターIIダッシュターボ -Hyper Fighting-)	Versus Fighting
Street Fighter Alpha	1995	Street Fighter Zero (ストリートファイターZERO)	Versus Fighting
The King of Dragons	1995	The King of Dragons (ザ・キングオブドラゴンズ)	Beat 'em up

== Awards ==
Only three CP System titles won awards for Game of the Year including Strider Hiryu in 1990, Street Fighter II: The World Warrior in 1991, and Street Fighter II': Champion Edition in 1992.

== See also ==
- CP System II
- CP System III
