= Willow (arcade game) =

1989 video game

- Developer: Capcom
- Publisher: Capcom
- Director: Yoshiki Okamoto
- Designers: Hiroyuki Kawano; Seigo Ito
- Programmers: Yukio Arai; Kyoko Tomita; Yokoyan; Ueyan
- Artists: Franky Sezabon; Yokota Yokozo; Terukun; Hiramacho
- Composer: Takashi Tateishi
- Series: Willow
- Platform: Arcade
- Release: JP: June 1989; NA: September 1989; EU: 1989
- Genres: Action, platform, run and gun, hack and slash
- Modes: Single-player, multiplayer
- Arcade system: CP System

Willow (Note: Japanese: ウィロー, Hepburn: Uirō) is a 1989 arcade game by Capcom. Capcom published two different games in 1989 based on the 1988 film of the same name. The arcade version is a platform game while the Nintendo Entertainment System version is an action role-playing game.

== Gameplay ==
Willow battles the first level boss in the arcade game

Willow is a side scrolling platform and run and gun game. The game follows the film's plot: The evil witch queen Bavmorda is after the holy baby of the lands, Elora Danan, intent on destroying her. A young peaceful wizard called Willow Ufgood was selected to protect Elora. Later on, a brave warrior named Madmartigan joins Willow to fight the enemy rival General Kael. Bavmorda is the final antagonist that they face off against. The arcade version belongs to the platform genre. It has six stages, some where Willow plays his part, others where Madmartigan plays his and one where either character is selectable. Madmartigan is a melee character who can fight only at close quarters, while Willow has a projectile attack.

The stages consist of Crossroad, Cherlindrea's Forest, Fin Raziel's Island, Sorsha's Camp, Tir Asleen Castle, and Nockmaar Castle. Each stage must be completed within a certain amount of time. Defeated enemies drop coins which the player can collect to purchase items at shops. Depending on whether the player is playing as Willow or Madmartigan, either magic blasts or sword swipes are the attacks. Madmartigan's attack has less range than Willow's, but can destroy enemy projectiles. Both can purchase attack upgrades at shops. Madmartigan's upgrades give him greater power and range, while Willow's upgrades are far more versatile. With each upgrade, his regular blasts become more powerful, the actual upgrades being utilized by holding down the attack button and releasing it when the meter at the bottom reaches a certain point. The following are his magical upgrades:

1. Moonlight - sends a crescent shaped blast forward, which splits into smaller beams on impact, damaging enemies in its path.

2. Tornado - sends a tornado shaped blast forward and at a slightly upward angle.

3. Gold - defeats most on-screen regular enemies. The dropped coins are worth twice their normal value.

4. Time - freezes all regular enemies and their projectiles for a few seconds, during which time Willow is invincible (he flashes blue).

5. Explosive - sends cascades of blasts to both forward and back of Willow.

6. Crystal - sends a circular barrier around Willow, damaging enemies in its path. This is the only upgrade of Willow's magic that can destroy projectiles.

== Development and release ==
Willow for arcades is loosely based on the heroic fantasy movie of the same name by Ron Howard. Despite the film not doing well at the box office, the film generated several video games and tie-in merchandise. Capcom produced two video games based on the 1988 film, one being an arcade game and the other being an action role-playing game for the Nintendo Entertainment System. The game was part of a broader strategy of Capcom at the time to appeal to a wider audience by using established characters from other media. Director Yoshiki Okamoto stated that their original characters could be too niche, citing titles based on Area 88 and Destiny of an Emperor as part of the plan.

Willow was released by Capcom in Japan in June 1989 and North America in September of the same year as well as in Europe, using the CP System board. A version for the Capcom Power System Changer was planned and previewed, but never released. Video game journalists have noted that due to the licensing agreement, and the not thinking games would be played years after release, it would be unlikely Capcom would ever re-release the game. The title was not included in the Capcom Home Arcade plug and play game system.

== Reception ==
Reception

Review scores
Publication	Score
ACE	3/5
AllGame	2.5/5
Computer and Video Games	85%
Génération 4	9/10
MeriStation	8.0/10
Sinclair User	8/10
Your Sinclair	78/100
Zero	3/5
Commodore User	88%

In Japan, Game Machine listed it on their July 15, 1989, issue as being the second most-popular arcade game at the time. In North America, it was considered a successful title for the CPS board, with Capcom VP of Sales and Marketing Bill Cravens saying that "U.N. Squadron and Willow were major hits". Willow was well received by critics since its release in arcades, with multiple reviewers praising the game's graphics at the time.

Multiple reviewers noted it plays similar to Ghosts n' Goblins, also by Capcom. Retro Gamer noted it had similar level layouts, and deaths they described as "cheap" designed to make players spend coins in the arcade. Since the game was never ported to a home console, they suggested buying Ghouls n' Ghosts for the Sega Mega Drive as an alternative. The One's Gary Whitta praised the graphics for both the characters and backgrounds while noting the character sprites looked like their movie counterparts. However, Whitta believed the gameplay was limited and would mostly appeal to fans of the movie for a short amount of time.

Retrospective reviewers also praised the game. PlayStation Portable-focused magazine Go Play reviewed Willow alongside The Punisher and Cadillacs and Dinosaurs calling them "some of the best CPS1 games you're unlikely to ever play on a Capcom compilation". IGN Italia's Stefano Castelli praised the game in 2019 and said he wished it had been ported to home consoles.
