= Supergun =

Supergun may refer to:

- Large-calibre artillery, large military weapons
- SuperGun, an arcade-game controller
- Supergun affair, a 1990 UK political scandal

== See also ==
- Space gun
