= Carrier Air Wing (video game) =

1990 video game

- Developer: Capcom
- Publisher: Capcom
- Designer: Noritaka Funamizu
- Composer: Manami Matsumae
- Platform: Arcade
- Release: October 1990
- Genre: Scrolling shooter
- Arcade system: CP System

Carrier Air Wing, released in Japan as U.S. Navy (Note: Japanese: ユー・エス・ネイビー, Hepburn: Yū Esu Neibī), is a 1990 side-scrolling shooter video game developed and published by Capcom for arcades. It is the spiritual successor to U.N. Squadron, which was released in the previous year. A version for the Capcom Power System Changer was planned and previewed but never released. It was later re-released on Capcom Arcade Stadium.

== Gameplay ==
A screenshot showing a McDonnell Douglas F/A-18 Hornet and a Grumman F-14 Tomcat dogfighting against a group of enemy Mikoyan-Gurevich MiG-23 jet fighters.

As with the original, players chose any one of three different jet fighters and battle their way through ten enemy-packed stages. Other ideas carried over from U.N. Squadron include the shop, which allows players to buy weapon and shield upgrades for their jet fighter between stages, and the energy bar, which is replaced by a "fuel bar" which starts full at the start of each stage and decreases as time passes with some fuel lost each time the plane is damaged. The game has two different endings, depending on whether the game is finished with only one coin or not.

== Reception ==
Reception

Review scores
Publication	Score
AllGame	2/5
Sinclair User	82%
Your Sinclair	68°/100°
Zero	2/5

In Japan, Game Machine listed Carrier Air Wing on their December 1, 1990 issue as being the most-successful table arcade unit of the month, outperforming titles such as Raiden and Columns II. In the January 1991 issue of Japanese publication Micom BASIC Magazine, the game was ranked on the number eight spot in popularity. In May 1991, UK magazine Zero ranked it on their number three spot in popularity. Martin Gaksch of German magazine Power Play gave the game a mixed outlook.
