= Sanrio Cup: Pon Pon Volley =

1992 video game

- Developer: Character Soft
- Publisher: Character Soft
- Composer: Manami Matsumae
- Platform: Family Computer
- Release: JP: July 17, 1992
- Genre: Sports
- Modes: Single-player, multiplayer

Sanrio Cup: Pon Pon Volley (サンリオカップポンポンバレー) is a volleyball video game featuring many of the popular Sanrio characters including Hello Kitty, Keroppi and Minna no Tabo. Matches can be played in with either two, three or four players. Players can choose between three different tracks of background music, or to simply play without the music.

The game is basically a volleyball/tennis game but without the nets, closely resembling four-square. There is an option to increase the difficulty level that modifies the level of intelligence with which computer-controlled play. There are opportunities to commit do-overs. After the end of the game, the player is awarded with a large ostrich trophy.

Though the game was released exclusively in Japan, a fan translation to English was made.
