= The Punisher (1993 video game) =

1993 beat 'em up game

- North American arcade flyer
- Developer: Capcom (Note: Genesis/Mega Drive port developed by Sculptured Software.)
- Publisher: Capcom
- Director: Noritaka Funamizu
- Producer: Yoshiki Okamoto
- Designers: Akira Yasuda; Jun Keiba; Junichi Ohno
- Programmers: Kazuhito Nakai; Tomohiro Ueno; Yoji Mikami
- Artists: Haruki Suetsugu; Eri Nakamura; Hiroaki Minobe
- Composers: Yoko Shimomura; Isao Abe
- Series: The Punisher
- Platforms: Arcade, Genesis/Mega Drive
- Release: Arcade: JP: May 1993; NA: July 1993; Genesis/Mega Drive: NA: February 1995; EU: April 1995
- Genre: Beat 'em up
- Modes: Single-player, multiplayer
- Arcade system: CP System Dash

The Punisher (Note: Japanese: パニッシャー, Hepburn: Panisshā) is a 1993 beat 'em up video game developed and published by Capcom for arcades. It stars the Marvel Comics antihero the Punisher and co-stars S.H.I.E.L.D. agent Nick Fury as the second player's character as they embark on a mission to kill the crime lord the Kingpin and bring down his organization. While following the same general formula as Capcom's previous beat 'em ups, the game has a range of usable weapons and a comic book-style presentation.

The Punisher gained significant popularity in arcades and is widely regarded as one of the best titles in the beat 'em up genre as well as one of the best video game adaptations of comic books. A Sega Genesis port was developed by Sculptured Software and published by Capcom to mixed reviews and commercial failure.

== Gameplay ==
Co-op gameplay in Stage 3 ("Waterfront Warfare") of the arcade version, with the Punisher and Nick Fury facing the Pretty Boys and ninja women.

The Punisher follows the same side-scrolling beat 'em up formula Capcom established in Final Fight (1989) and Captain Commando (1991) as the protagonists engage ordinary foes and stage bosses. As in most beat 'em up games of this kind, progression through the game is achieved by systematically dispatching all varieties of henchmen to proceed onward to either right or left, and defeating the ringleaders whom the player(s) encounter at the boss stage of each level. Much like the limited roster of playable characters in Street Fighter (1987), the size, abilities and tactics of both player characters (the Punisher and Nick Fury) are essentially interchangeable; they both use the same basic moves, such as punches, kicks and throws, which can be chained into combos, as well as similar special attacks. Basic attacks can be combined to cause extra damage to enemies. The game is presented in a style reminiscent of comic books, with on-screen onomatopoeias such as "BLAM!" for gunshots.

Various melee (including baseball bats and Japanese swords) and thrown weapons (including knives and shuriken) as well as improvised weapons (such as lead pipes, car tires and a crude flamethrower) can be picked up during regular combat. Weapons can be dropped by killed enemies or obtained from smashing various containers throughout the stages. When the player is armed with a weapon, its durability will be displayed alongside the player's health, showing how much it can be used until it breaks apart. Treasure can also be found in containers, awarding the player with bonus score points once collected (jewelry also appears after defeating female enemies). Health can be replenished by picking up food, which can also give bonus points. The game distinguished itself by the relatively high level of violence in a video game of the era, as well by the frequent use of firearms, including an Ingram and an M16. There are several sections of the game when gun-wielding enemies appear to which the characters draw their handguns, enabling the player to shoot them. Player characters can also pick up and collect hand grenades that can be deployed at a moment of choice.

== Plot ==
In the game's intro, U.S. Marine Captain Frank Castle enjoys a picnic with his family in Central Park. However, Frank's wife and children accidentally witness a mob killing and are murdered as a result. To avenge the death of his family, Frank becomes a vigilante known as the Punisher, who wages a one-man war on crime.

The game begins in an illegal casino and the streets of the New York City, with the Punisher (optionally partnered with S.H.I.E.L.D. agent Nick Fury) in pursuit of the Mafia enforcer Bruno Costa, who ordered the killing of the Punisher's family. The chase ends with a fight against Chester Scully (a minor villain from the comics), whom the Punisher "interrogates" until he gets the information he needs before promptly shooting Scully. Still on the trail of Bruno, the Punisher infiltrates the mob's Pantaberde resort in Florida via a water duct. He breaks into a hotel and corners Bruno, who is suddenly killed by Guardroid, a robot that the Kingpin has programmed to terminate the Punisher. After defeating Guardroid, the Punisher then raids a major drug smuggling ring at a local harbor, which ends with him confronting Bonebreaker in a waterfront warehouse. After that, the Punisher attacks the Kingpin's poppy field at a cave in Arizona. The Punisher boards and destroys a freight train commanded by Bushwhacker.

At this point, the Kingpin decides that he has lost enough henchmen and money to the Punisher's actions. He puts a hefty contract out on the Punisher, who is then chased by assassins from his hideout and through a forest. After defeating another Guardroid, the Punisher infiltrates the King Building, fighting his way through Jigsaw and other enemies to the final showdown against the Kingpin himself. After the Kingpin is defeated, the entire tower collapses, but the Kingpin is not found amongst the many dead criminals in the rubble.

== Development and release ==
=== Arcade ===
The Punisher was first released for arcades in Japan in May 1993, followed by North America in July 1993. The game marked the beginning of a partnership between Capcom and Marvel Comics, which led to the Marvel vs. Capcom series. The game runs on the CP System Dash hardware, an enhanced version of Capcom's CP System hardware that allowed more than ten enemies to appear on screen at the same time with no slowdowns. A pre-release version included some cut content such as rocket launchers. A version for the Capcom Power System Changer was planned and previewed but never released. Artwork from the game was featured in the 2012 art book Marvel vs. Capcom: Official Complete Works by Udon Entertainment. In 2019, the game was announced as one of the titles to be included in the Marvel Arcade1Up arcade cabinet.

In June 2024, Capcom announced that The Punisher would be among the games included in the Marvel vs. Capcom Fighting Collection: Arcade Classics compilation, which was released that September, marking the first time the original arcade version was ported to consoles without changes.

=== Genesis/Mega Drive ===
A port of The Punisher was released for the Sega Genesis/Mega Drive in North America in February 1995, followed by PAL regions in April 1995. This version was developed by American company Sculptured Software, and features downgraded graphics and sound, a lesser variety of enemies, and a smaller number of objects on screen than in the original. Many of the previously breakable background objects were rendered unbreakable due to the limitations of the Genesis's hardware.

This version also contains some censorship, including the removal of the most explicit violence as well as the animation of Fury smoking his cigar, and female ninja enemies with skimpy outfits becoming fully clothed. The port also comes with three difficulty settings, but the easy mode ends after only three stages, and the game can only be fully completed in normal or hard mode. A version for the PlayStation was reported to be in the works at Crystal Dynamics, but was never completed.

== Reception ==
Reception

Aggregate score
| Aggregator | Score |
|---|---|
| GameRankings | 73% (Genesis) |

Review scores
| Publication | Score |
|---|---|
| Electronic Gaming Monthly | 6/10 (Genesis) |
| Hyper | 48% (Genesis) |
| Next Generation | 1/5 (Genesis) |
| GamePower | 33/40 (Arcade); 3.8/5 (Genesis) |
| Hobby Consolas | 81% (Genesis) |
| Man!ac | 58% (Genesis) |
| Player One | 60% (Genesis) |
| Superjuegos | 68% (Genesis) |
| TodoSega | 84% (Genesis) |
| Top Consoles | 13% (Genesis) |
| VG&CE | 7/10 (Genesis) |

=== Arcade ===
Upon its release, Play Meter listed The Punisher as one of the most popular arcade games of May 1993. In Japan, Game Machine also listed it as the eighth most popular arcade game of June 1993. GamePower gave the arcade version of The Punisher a perfect partial score for the game's "fun factor". Its action was praised by GamePro, who remarked that "this game's outstanding feature is its gorgeous graphics, which capture the dark, somber mood of the Punisher comic books". A GameFan reviewer said that the game "proved to be everything I dreamed of in a traditional Final Fight-style game", having previously described it as "definitely the greatest side scrolling fighting game ever" as well as "the bloodiest, goriest fighting game since Mortal Kombat" in his preview.

=== Genesis/Mega Drive ===
Reviewing the Genesis/Mega Drive version, VideoGames called it "a decent exercise in vigilante mayhem" and a "surprisingly fun, yet fairly standard game". A preview by Mean Machines Sega opined it "looks good" and features "fantastic weaponry", but Electronic Gaming Monthly criticized the characters for being too small on the screen, also stating that there was little to no skill involved in defeating the bosses. EGM praised the number of weapons and moves available, but nonetheless concluded that "the whole game comes across as routine and bland". Mega Play reviewers especially criticized the port's removal of gore and the "drab" and "dull" color palette, issuing it four scores of between 67 and 72%.

GamePro outright panned the port, commenting that the special moves are too difficult to pull off, the sound effects are weak, the gameplay is generic and unimaginative beat 'em up fare, and "the graphics never come close to the coin-op game that this cart is based on". It was also lambasted by Next Generation, who stated that "not much good can be found" in the game and "the person responsible for putting out The Punisher deserves a good spanking". Hyper even had The Punisher as the worst rated game of the month, describing it as "almost like an 8 bit game: scrappy graphics, stilted animation, sloooowww scrolling and only two (yes, two) buttons on the controller used". The game sold poorly, resulting in it becoming one the rarest PAL region titles for the platform.

=== Retrospective ===
Notwithstanding the flawed Genesis port and limited commercial success, the arcade original has achieved a cult game status. Sega Saturn Magazine and Official U.S. PlayStation Magazine both wished for The Punisher to be included in Capcom's arcade compilation releases for the Sega Saturn and the PlayStation, respectively. According to GamesTM in 2005, "Capcom's The Punisher was a brutally violent fighter that perfectly captured the antihero it was based on. Featuring buckets of blood, some nasty moves and hordes of enemies, action came thick and fast, and so did the excitement". The magazine too expressed a wish for it to be included in a compilation re-release for a more modern gaming system, in this case the PlayStation Portable, but noted that the chances of this are slim due to a long-expired license.

Retro Gamer called it "a forgotten gem in Capcom's back catalogue" that "is bursting with character and is extremely enjoyable", surmising the game did not sell well because the market was already flooded with beat 'em up games. Some media outlets also singled out for a special praise the game's particular elements, such as with Complex regarding its arcade cabinet and Cracked.com regarding its game over sequence. Crunchyroll's Patrick Macias wrote: "I'll confess my heart skipped a beat when I read The Punisher arcade game, the legacy of a misspent youth and countless tokens whittled away at Chuck E. Cheese".

Some critics regard The Punisher as among the best of the beat 'em up genre, as well as among the best video game adaptations of comic books, especially of Marvel titles. In 2010, it was ranked the tenth top greatest superhero game by IGN's News & Features Team, and the fifth top Marvel arcade game by iFanboy's Josh Richardson. Nerdist Industries included it among the top ten most iconic Marvel video games in 2013, calling it "one of the few games that benefits from its cheesiness" and stating that in 1993 the two-player experience "was pretty much what Army of Two wishes it was today". That same year, it was also listed as one of top beat 'em up games of all time by Heavy.com's Elton Jones, and was included amongst the best-looking beat 'em up games from the 16-bit era by Kotaku Australia's Gergo Vas. In 2011, David Hawkins of WhatCulture! named it the best comics-based arcade game, being "above and beyond all other arcade adaptations of comic books and their heroes." Jon Ledford of Arcade Sushi opined that "in terms of pure enjoyment, ingenuity, control, and graphics, The Punisher is the Best Retro Beat 'Em Up of all time".

PlayStation Portable magazine Go Play reviewed the game alongside Willow and Cadillacs and Dinosaurs, calling them "some of the best CPS1 games you're unlikely to ever play on a Capcom compilation".
