= Manami Matsumae =

Japanese composer (born 1964)

- 松前 真奈美
- Born: Manami Gotoh; December 25, 1964 (age 61); Tokyo, Japan
- Other name: Chanchacorin
- Occupations: Composer, arranger
- Years active: 1987–present
- Spouse: Kimitaka Matsumae
- Musical career
- Genres: Video game music
- Instrument: Piano
- Label: Brave Wave Productions

Manami Matsumae (松前 真奈美, Matsumae Manami) is a Japanese video game music composer. She previously worked for Capcom in the 1980s, writing music for games such as Dynasty Wars, Mercs, Magic Sword, and the original Mega Man.

== Career ==
She previously worked for Capcom, where she worked on titles such as SonSon II, Dynasty Wars, U.N. Squadron, Mercs, Magic Sword, and Carrier Air Wing. She is best known, however, for composing the music for the original Mega Man, including its iconic "Game Start" jingle. Matsumae was known during her days at Capcom by her maiden name, Manami Gotoh (後藤 真奈美, Gotoh Manami), but was usually credited by her alias, Chanchacorin.

Following her departure from Capcom in 1990, she became a freelance composer. The soundtracks she worked on afterwards include the Derby Stallion series, Game Boy titles developed by Sunsoft, and other games such as The Adventures of Lolo, Another Bible, Daffy Duck: The Marvin Missions, Jade Cocoon 2, and Dragon Quest Swords: The Masked Queen and the Tower of Mirrors. She also married fellow musician, Kimitaka Matsumae (originally part of Sega's S.S.T. Band), with whom she worked with on Othello World and Jade Cocoon 2.

Matsumae returned to the Mega Man series via Inti Creates, serving as a guest arranger for some of its album releases, and joining several other former Mega Man composers in creating the Robot Master themes for Mega Man 10. In 2014, she joined the Tokyo based label Brave Wave. The label aims to help connect composers with international companies, which is how she contributed music to Shovel Knight.

In July 2015, it was announced that Matsumae would be working on her first original solo album, in addition to a tribute album featuring arrangements by her. The album, titled Three Movements, was released in December 2017.

== Works ==
Year	Title	Role(s)
1987	Ide Yosuke Meijin no Jissen Mahjong	Music with Harumi Fujita
1987	Mega Man	Music
1988	F1 Dream	Music
1988	1943 Kai: Midway Kaisen	Music with several others
1989	Final Fight	Music with several others
1989	SonSon II	Music
1989	Dynasty Wars	Music
1989	U.N. Squadron	Music
1990	Mercs	Music
1990	Magic Sword: Heroic Fantasy	Music
1990	Carrier Air Wing	Music
1991	Capcom no Quiz: Tonosama no Yabou	Music
1991	Derby Stallion: Best Race	Music
1992	Batman: Return of the Joker	Music
1992	Sanrio Cup: Pon Pon Volley	Music
1992	Derby Stallion: National Edition	Music
1992	Trip World	Music
1992	Best Play Pro Yakyuu Special	Music
1992	Looney Tunes	Music
1992	Honō no Dōkyūji: Dodge Danpei	Music with Hiroshi Tsukamoto
1992	Othello World	Music with Kimitaka Matsumae
1992	Esper Dream 2	Music with Shigemasa Matsuo
1993	Honō no Dōkyūji: Dodge Danpei 2	Music with Hiroshi Tsukamoto
1993	Vegas Stakes	Music with Kimitaka Matsumae
1994	Adventures of Lolo	Music
1994	Derby Stallion II	Music
1994	Tenchi o Kurau	Music
1994	Daffy Duck: The Marvin Missions	Music
1995	Another Bible	Music
1995	Derby Stallion III	Music
1996	Derby Stallion '96	Music
1996	G.O.D: Mezameyo to Yobu Koe ga Kikoe	Music with Kimitaka Matsumae and Yuuichi Matsuzaki
1996	Derby Stallion	Music
1998	Pilot Kids	Music
1998	Derby Stallion '98	Music
1999	Derby Stallion '99	Music
1999	Fun! Fun! Pingu	Music
2001	Jade Cocoon 2	Music with Kimitaka Matsumae
2002	Best Play Pro Yakyuu	Music
2002	Derby Stallion Advance	Music
2006	Derby Stallion P	Music
2007	Dragon Quest Swords	Music
2010	Mighty Fight Federation	"The Battle is Over"
2010	Mega Man 10	"Nitro Rider (Nitro Man Stage)"
2014	Shovel Knight	Music with Jake Kaufman
2014	Rainblocks	Music
2015	Target Acquired	Music
2016	Flat Kingdom	Music
2016	Mighty No. 9	Music with several others
2017	Starr Mazer	Music with several others
2018	Ultra Space Battle Brawl	Opening theme
2020	Derby Stallion	Music
2021	Dark Water: Slime Invader	Music
2021	Battle Axe	Music with Alex Aniel
2023	9 Years of Shadows	Music with Michiru Yamane and Norihiko Hibino
