= Magic Sword: Heroic Fantasy =

1990 video game

- Developer: Capcom
- Publisher: Capcom
- Designers: Yoshimi Ohnishi; Tomoshi Sadamoto; Yoshiki Okamoto
- Artists: Tomoshi Sadamoto; Kazunori Tazaki; Akemi Iwasaki
- Composer: Manami Matsumae
- Platforms: Arcade, Super NES
- Release: 1990
- Genre: Hack and slash
- Modes: Single-player, multiplayer
- Arcade system: CP System

Magic Sword: Heroic Fantasy (マジックソード) is a 1990 hack and slash video game developed and published by Capcom for arcades. The player is cast as a hero who fights through a mystical tower to save the world. The player can use a sword, axe or magic, and can also rescue and recruit potential allies of various character classes, each with special abilities.

== Plot ==
Magic Sword takes place in an unnamed world, which is being threatened by the dark lord Drokmar (Dracmar in the original Japanese), who has control over an evil crystal known as the "Black Orb", which would allow him to rule over the world. In order to prevent this from happening, the hero, known as the Brave One (Alan in the original Japanese), must scale to the top of the 50-floor tower in which Drokmar resides, known as Dragon Keep. At the game's end, when Drokmar is defeated, the player has the option of two endings: destroy the Black Orb, or to take control of it, becoming the new dark lord.

== Gameplay ==
Arcade version screenshot

Magic Sword shares many gameplay elements with Black Tiger. The game has side-scrolling fighting, with some platforming elements. The player controls only the main character. The accompanying ally, controlled by the computer, follows the player diligently and only attacks and jumps when the player does. Assistant characters consist of Amazon (archer), Big Man (wields an axe), Knight, Lizardman, Ninja, Priest, Thief and Wizard. The player is allowed to carry one item, which can assist the player or the current ally.

The player has a magic meter. It fills up while the player is not attacking, but it empties completely each time the player attacks. If the player attacks when the meter is empty or is blue, the player can only perform a melee attack when the standard attack button is used. Magical allies like the priest and the wizard will not attack in this situation. If it is red but not full, the player and any magical ally teamed up with him will perform a weak ranged magical attack alongside the melee attack. If it is full, the player and any magical ally teamed up with him will perform a strong ranged magical attack alongside the melee attack. Non-magical allies will attack when the player attacks regardless of the status of the magic meter.

The player's health is displayed as a set of five HP bars and a number next to the HP bars that counts the number of sets of five full HP bars beyond the ones that are shown on screen in case the player has more than five full HP bars. The ally has a separate HP meter that maxes out at four HP bars.

Full screen attacks can be performed either instantly when a magical book is collected or on demand at the cost of one full HP bar.

The game has about 50 levels, and multiple endings with two alternate outcomes. There are 51 floors to fight through in the game. Eight of these floors have boss characters at the end, including Drokmar himself at the end of the 50th floor. Additionally, there are seven "Secret Doors" which allows the player to bypass levels when specific maneuvers are performed.

== Development ==
During development, Capcom was going to program the gameplay so the player could have up to two allies (four in total in a two-player game). The hardest part of the game was the placement of enemies in each stage. One of the last features implemented in the game was the secret doors. The game was being location-tested in Japan by April 1990.

The SNES version was announced at the 1992 Winter CES.

== Ports ==
A single player-only port was released for the Super NES in 1992 and for mobile phones in 2008. A version for the Capcom Power System Changer was planned and previewed but never released. The full arcade version is included in Capcom Classics Collection Remixed for PlayStation Portable, Capcom Classics Collection Vol. 2 for PlayStation 2 and Xbox, and Capcom Arcade 2nd Stadium for Nintendo Switch, PlayStation 4, Xbox One, and Windows.

The arcade version was also released alongside Final Fight in a two-in-one bundle titled Final Fight: Double Impact for Xbox Live Arcade and PlayStation Network in April 2010.

== Reception ==
Reception

Review scores
Publication	Score	
Publication	Arcade	SNES
AllGame	3.5/5	N/A
Computer and Video Games	87%	84/100
Famitsu	N/A	25/40
Game Players	N/A	5/10
Super Play	N/A	58%
VideoGames & Computer Entertainment	N/A	6/10
Your Sinclair	86/100	N/A
Zero	3.5/5	N/A
Control	N/A	58%
CU Amiga	78%	N/A
Electronic Games	N/A	75%
Mean Machines	N/A	71%
SNES Force	N/A	64%
Super Action	N/A	73%
The Super Famicom	N/A	64/100
Super Gamer	N/A	67%
Super Pro	N/A	67/100

Awards
Publication	Award
Gamest (1990-1991)	(ARC) Grand Prize 9th, Best Action Award 2nd, Best Production Award 8th, Best Graphics Award 2nd, Player Popularity 8th, Annual Hit Game 9th, Annual Hit Game 30th
Micom BASIC Magazine (1990)	(ARC) Overall Grand Prize 6th, Game Center Department 9th, Player/Reader 6th

In Japan, Game Machine listed Magic Sword on their September 1, 1990 issue as being the second most-popular arcade game for the previous two weeks. The Japanese publication Micom BASIC Magazine ranked the game tenth in popularity in its October 1990 issue. In North America, it was ranked twelfth among arcade games in a November 1990 equipment survey by Play Meter.

The game also received generally favorable reviews. Computer and Video Games' Julian Rignall called it a well executed game and said that it will appeal to fans of slash 'em ups. Your Sinclair's David Wilson found it to be a unoriginal but highly playable coin-op game.

Gamest gave Magic Sword multiple awards at the fourth and fifth annual "Gamest Awards", placing 9th in the "Grand Prize", 2nd in the "Best Action Award", 8th in the "Best Production Award", 2nd in the "Best Graphics Award", 8th in the "Player Popularity", as well as 9th and 30th in the "Annual Hit Game". The game was ranked 49th in a 1991 readers' poll by Gamest of all arcade games in operation up to that point. Micom BASIC Magazine also gave it several awards at the 1990 "Video Game Grand Prize", placing 6th in "Overall Grand Prize", 9th in "Game Center Department", and 6th in "Player/Reader".

=== Super NES ===
According to Famitsu, Magic Sword sold 4,531 copies in its first week on the market and 6,637 copies during its lifetime in Japan. The Japanese publication Micom BASIC Magazine ranked the game fourth in popularity in its August 1992 issue, and it received a 20.50/30 score in a 1993 readers' poll conducted by Super Famicom Magazine, ranking among Super Famicom titles at the number 162 spot. The Super NES version garnered average reception from critics. Super Play's Jonathan Davies criticized the game's awful animations, negligible sound effects, and slowdown at the slightest provocation.
