= Reavers (comics) =

Fictional comic book cyborgs

- The Reavers in Uncanny X-Men #252 (November 1989). Cover art by Jim Lee.

Publication information
- Publisher: Marvel Comics
- First appearance: Uncanny X-Men #229 (May 1988)
- Created by: Chris Claremont (writer); Marc Silvestri (artist)

In-story information
- Member(s): Donald Pierce; Lady Deathstrike; Pretty Boy; Bonebreaker; Skullbuster; Wade Cole; Angelo Macon; Murray Reese; Skullbuster (Cylla Markham); Josh Foley

The Reavers are a supervillain team appearing in American comic books published by Marvel Comics. Created by Chris Claremont and Marc Silvestri, the group first appeared in Uncanny X-Men #229 (May 1988).

Originally depicted as a gang of criminal cyborgs from Australia, the Reavers are defeated by the X-Men in their initial encounter. The remaining members are subsequently reassembled and reorganized into a pseudo-military group under the leadership of Donald Pierce. In this capacity, they continue to menace the X-Men and mutants in general, and pursue a personal vendetta against Wolverine.

The Reavers appeared in the 2017 film Logan, with their leader Donald Pierce portrayed by Boyd Holbrook.

== Publication history ==
The Reavers first appeared in Uncanny X-Men #229 (May 1988) and were created by writer Chris Claremont and artist Marc Silvestri.

== Fictional group history ==
=== Looters ===
The original Reavers operate out of an underground complex beneath the fictional ghost town of Cooterman's Creek in Central Australia. They act as a commando-style team of thieves, coercing the mutant Gateway to assist them in robberies. Informed of the Reavers' existence by Roma, the X-Men defeat the Reavers in battle and expel them from their base, which they take for their own use. The X-Men destroy some of the Reavers and force most of the rest to enter the Siege Perilous to meet unrevealed fates; only Pretty Boy, Skullbuster, and Bonebreaker escape.

=== Donald Pierce's Reavers ===
The Reavers are reassembled under the leadership of Donald Pierce, who reorganizes the team as an assassination squadron to undertake para-military style commando operations, dedicated to taking vengeance on the X-Men and eliminating mutants.

While the X-Men are away from their Australian base, the Reavers retake the base and wait for the team to come back. However, on their return, the X-Men escape the Reavers through the Siege Perilous. Only Wolverine, who is on a leave of absence in Madripoor, remains. Once Wolverine returns, he is captured and tortured by the Reavers until he escapes with the aid of Jubilee.

Pierce creates an android named Elsie-Dee and a robotic clone of Wolverine named Albert to kill Wolverine, which fails when Elsie-Dee rebels against her programming.

=== Upstarts and humans ===
As part of the Upstarts' game, Trevor Fitzroy dispatches Sentinels to the Reavers' Australian hideout to kill Pierce and anyone else they find there. In the ensuing battle, only Pierce, Lady Deathstrike and Cylla Markham (the second Skullbuster) escape the massacre. Pierce puts together a new group of Reavers, composed of young anti-mutant humans. Reavers member Joshua Foley leaves the group after learning that he is a mutant.

=== Messiah Complex ===
The latest incarnation of the Reavers in Messiah Complex. Art by Humberto Ramos.

The Reavers appear in the "Messiah Complex" storyline under the leadership of Lady Deathstrike. Deployed as an elite commando unit designed to eliminate organized mutant resistance, the Reavers confront Cable in Alberta, Canada, before being attacked by X-Force. In the ensuing battle, Deathstrike is killed by Wolverine's strike team.

Pierce and the Reavers are placed in the custody of the Office of National Emergency under the supervision of General Callahan. Callahan uses the Reavers as a personal scavenger crew, having them aid his agenda of illicitly capturing mutants. In return, the Reavers are given bionic augmentations, which contain in-built safeguards to enforce their obedience.

== Known members ==
=== First Team ===
- Bonebreaker
- Skullbuster
- Pretty Boy
- Various unnamed members (deceased or reincarnated)

=== Second Team ===
- Donald Pierce (leader)
- Lady Deathstrike
- Wade Cole (deceased)
- Angelo Macon (deceased)
- Murray Reese (deceased)
- Bonebreaker
- Skullbuster
- Skullbuster (Cylla Markham)
- Pretty Boy

=== Third Team ===
- Donald Pierce (leader)
- Joshua Foley (quit)
- Duncan
- Various unnamed members

=== Fourth Team ===
- Lady Deathstrike (leader)
- Various unnamed members (all presumed deceased)

=== Fifth Team ===
- Donald Pierce (leader)
- Pretty Boy
- Skullbuster (Cylla Markham)
- Bonebreaker
- Lady Deathstrike (defected)

== In other media ==
=== Television ===
- The Reavers appear in the X-Men: The Animated Series two-part episode "Out of the Past", consisting of Lady Deathstrike, Bonebreaker, Pretty Boy, Murray Reese, Skullbuster, and Wade Cole.
- The Reavers appear in Wolverine and the X-Men, with vocal effects provided by Charlie Adler in the episode "X-Calibre" and Steve Blum in "Hunting Grounds". This version of the group serves Mojo and consists of Spiral, Murray Reese, Wade Cole, Angelo Macon, and series-original character Ricochet, among other unidentified members.

=== Film ===
The Reavers appear in Logan, consisting of Donald Pierce, Bonebreaker, Pretty Boy, Angelo Macon, Danny Rhodes, and Mohawk. This version of the group is Alkali-Transigen's enhanced security force.

=== Video games ===
- The Reavers appear in X-Men as Magneto's soldiers.
- The Reavers appear in The Punisher, with Bonebreaker as a stage boss and several Pretty Boy cyborgs appearing in different stages.
- The Reavers appear in Strider Hiryu's ending in Ultimate Marvel vs. Capcom 3.
- The Reavers appear in Marvel Heroes, with Lady Deathstrike and Bonebreaker as prominent members.
- The Reavers appear in Marvel's Wolverine, with Omega Red and Skullbuster as prominent members. This version of the group is a private militia employed by Bolivar Trask and later by Nathaniel Essex.
