= Marvel's Wolverine =

2026 video game

Wolverine
- Cover art by Jock
- Developer: Insomniac Games
- Publisher: Sony Interactive Entertainment
- Directors: Marcus Smith; Brian Horton; Mike Daly; Cameron Christian
- Programmer: Doug Sheahan
- Artists: Gavin Goulden; Jacinda Chew; Grant Hollis
- Writers: Walt Williams; Mary Kenney
- Composer: David Fleming
- Series: Marvel's Spider-Man
- Platform: PlayStation 5
- Release: September 15, 2026
- Genre: Action-adventure
- Mode: Single-player

Marvel's Wolverine is a 2026 action-adventure game developed by Insomniac Games and published by Sony Interactive Entertainment for the PlayStation 5. Based on the Marvel Comics character Wolverine, it is inspired by the long-running comic book mythology and various adaptations in other media. Marvel's Wolverine is a standalone entry in the Marvel's Spider-Man series, telling an original, self-contained story that shares continuity with Insomniac's other Marvel games. The narrative follows Wolverine, an amnesiac mutant who rejoins his former unit, Team X, to investigate the abduction of displaced mutants by industrialist Bolivar Trask and the Reavers militia, while searching for answers regarding his own past.

Insomniac Games, Sony Interactive Entertainment, and Marvel Games entered discussions about developing further games centered on Marvel characters beyond Spider-Man during the development of Marvel's Spider-Man (2018), with Insomniac expressing interest in adapting Wolverine. Marvel's Wolverine was announced in September 2021, alongside the involvement of creative director Brian Horton and game director Cameron Christian, as well as writers Walt Williams and Mary Kenney.

Marvel's Wolverine was among the major subjects of a targeted ransomware attack on Insomniac Games in December 2023, in which various development assets showcasing gameplay and story elements briefly became publicly accessible. Horton and Christian were replaced by Marcus Smith and Mike Daly in their respective roles by October 2024. The game was released worldwide on September 15, 2026. It received generally favorable reviews from critics, with praise for its graphics, cinematics, voice acting, and the spectacle of its combat while being criticized for its lack of depth, repetitiveness, and weak narrative. As of November 4, 2026, the game has sold 2.4 million copies.

== Synopsis ==
=== Characters and setting ===
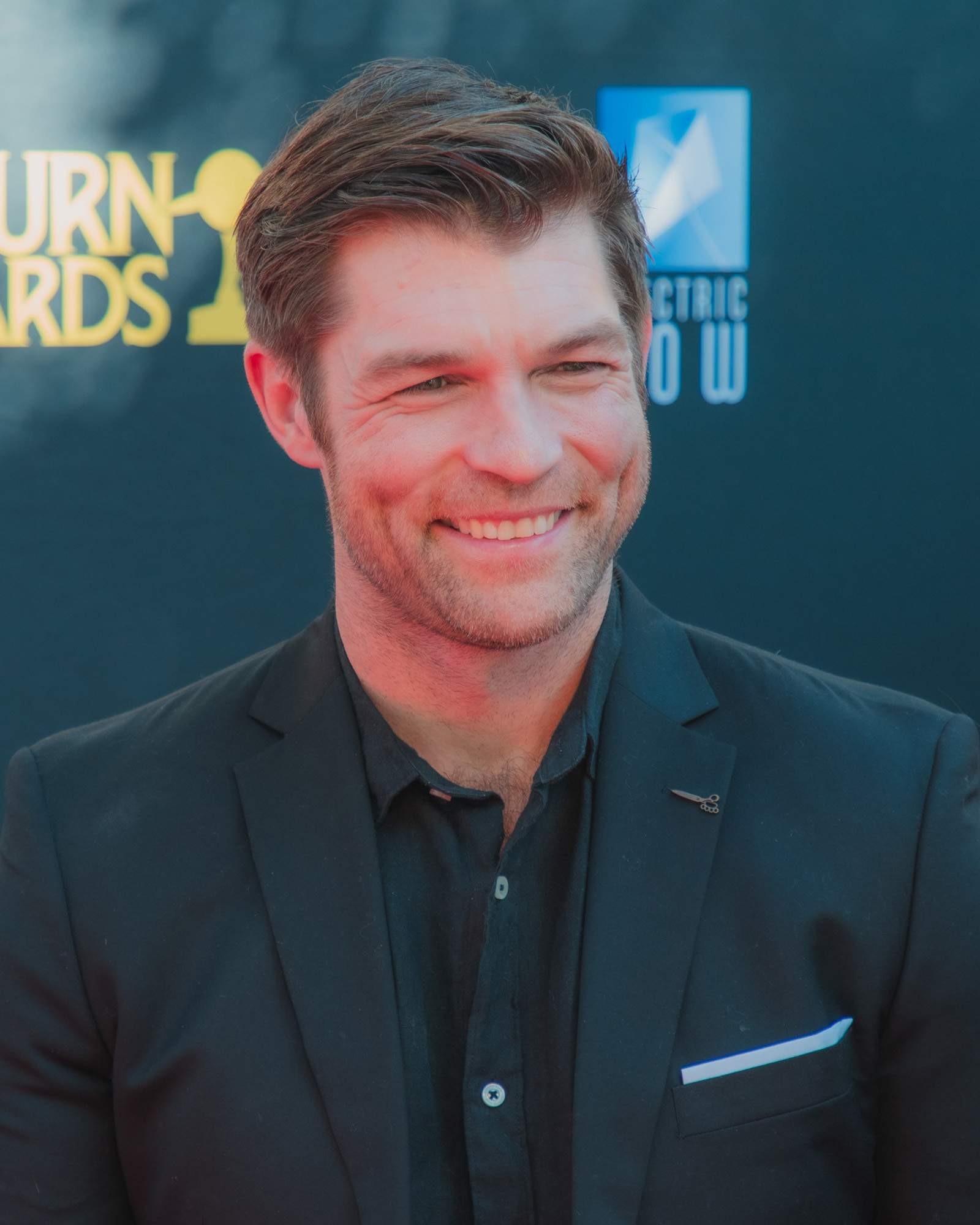
Liam McIntyre portrays James "Logan" Howlett / Wolverine in the game.

Marvel's Wolverine features an ensemble cast drawn from the comic book mythology of the character, the wider X-Men mythos, and various adaptations in other media. The game follows James "Logan" Howlett / Wolverine (Liam McIntyre), a centuries-old mutant with retractable claws, heightened animalistic instincts and a healing factor, who is grafted with an indestructible adamantium alloy in his skeleton following intense experimentation.

The game is set three years after Wolverine's departure from the mutant strike force Team X, as he rejoins the group to investigate the abduction of mutants by billionaire industrialist Bolivar Trask (Jason Spisak) and his cybernetically-enhanced private militia, the Reavers. Other characters that appear in the game include Jean Grey (Krizia Bajos), Dr. Nathaniel Essex (Troy Baker), Mystique (Nicole Pacent), Omega Red (Raphael Corkhill), Sabretooth (Brett Gipson), Lady Deathstrike (Jolene Kim), Leech (Noga Wind), Sunfire (Jonathan Tanigaki), Tyger Tiger (Kelly Hu), the Sentinels and the Hand.

=== Plot ===
A feral Logan is discovered by mutant geneticist Nathaniel Essex. Over the next 27 years, Logan works for Team X, a team created by Essex to protect mutants, with Logan adopting the codename "Wolverine" before quitting. Three years later, Logan reunites with his former teammates Sabretooth and Mystique to rescue Essex from a facility owned by Bolivar Trask, a scientist plotting to wipe out mutantkind. The team rescues Essex and defeats Trask's henchman Omega Red.

At the Essex Institute in Canada, Team X meets with Walter Langkowski to discuss the threat Trask poses. Logan travels to Vancouver to evacuate a group of mutants under attack by the Reavers, Trask's private militia. One of the mutants, Jean Grey, arrives to help Logan. The mutants' leader, Callisto, is wounded by Reavers leader Skullbuster. While Jean treats Callisto, Logan saves the other mutants before Trask can experiment on them. The rescued mutants take refuge with Essex, and Jean agrees to help Team X.

After the Reavers destroy the Institute, Team X relocates the surviving refugees to Madripoor, where they are sheltered by Mystique's human wife Tyger. Trask unveils a prototype Sentinel, a robot designed to hunt mutants. The team defeats it, and Trask is seized and tortured by Essex; Logan mercy-kills Trask, angering Essex and Sabretooth. That same night, a ninja cult known as the Hand abducts Walter.

Logan and Jean learn that Walter was working with the Hand and their leader, Lady Deathstrike, to build a Helix Engine, an ancient machine that can activate dormant mutant genes, but is fatal to those without the gene. The machine turns Walter into a feral ape-like creature, after which he is transported back to Madripoor. Deathstrike attempts to use the Helix Engine to heal herself, but it kills her instead.

Logan and Jean attempt to destroy the Engine, but Essex and Sabretooth arrive and seize it. Essex reveals to Logan that his powers were obtained through experiments on his wife, who was a telepathic mutant, and he grafted her mutant genes onto himself at the cost of her life. When Essex begins deploying miniature Sentinels to round up the dormant mutants of Madripoor, Logan tries to stop the assault with Jean, but is attacked by Sabretooth, whom he seemingly kills after a brutal skirmish. Essex deploys a giant Sentinel augmented with a Helix Engine, with the intention of forcibly activating dormant mutants across the city. The Sentinel kills Logan, but his consciousness survives, allowing Logan to recover several of his repressed memories.

Wandering through his mindscape while healing, Logan learns that his real name is James Howlett, and that he and Jean once lived together on a farm when Essex approached them to join Team X. Logan refused, causing Essex to attempt to mind-control him. This inadvertently awakened the "Beast" within Logan, who addressed itself as Apocalypse and Logan as Death. Logan's berserker rage was triggered, causing him to accidentally kill Jean when she tried to calm him. Essex forced Logan to repeatedly relive the memory of Jean's death, causing him to suffer a mental breakdown and turn feral, at which point Essex recruited him into Team X. Jean managed to reincarnate through her Phoenix Force powers, but without memories of her past life.

Logan revives himself and reunites with Jean. After freeing the captured mutants, the two encounter Walter, whose body and mind have been further corrupted; Jean is unable to heal Walter, and Logan mercy kills him at his urging. The pair discover that Essex has experimented on the kidnapped mutants, grafting their mutant genes and a piece of the Helix Engine onto himself to become the ultimate mutant. Essex reveals his plan to deploy Sentinels to major cities worldwide, intending to awaken dormant mutants across the planet.

Logan and Jean pursue Essex to Tokyo and destroy his Sentinel, which in turn disables the other Sentinels. Essex is fatally wounded by Logan, but manages to trigger his feral state and bring him under Apocalypse's control again. Jean purges Logan's mind, removing Apocalypse's influence at the cost of his memories. Logan sets off to rediscover his past and find a new purpose, while Jean stays with Callisto, who intends to rebuild Madripoor as a haven for mutants. In a secret ending set 75 years prior to the game's events, Jean is revealed to have known Logan throughout her previous lives. In a post-credits scene, Sabretooth, who survived his fight with Logan, finds Apocalypse and is appointed as one of his horsemen.

== Development ==
During the development of Marvel's Spider-Man (2018), developer Insomniac Games, Marvel Games and publisher Sony Interactive Entertainment discussed prospects for future games based on Marvel Comics properties beyond Spider-Man, with the team at Insomniac continually suggesting their desire to work on a game featuring Wolverine. The development team were drawn to the character through the similar moral compass he shares with Spider-Man, notably the fact that "both heroes feel deeply compelled to defend people who are less able to do so". Insomniac eventually elected to pitch this idea to both Marvel and Sony as their next licensed property following their successful collaboration with the two parties on developing Marvel's Spider-Man.

Marvel's Wolverine was announced alongside Marvel's Spider-Man 2 (2023) by Insomniac Games, during the PlayStation Showcase event in September 2021. The developers confirmed shortly thereafter that the standalone game shares continuity with the Marvel's Spider-Man games. Brian Horton and Cameron Christian were announced as the game's creative and game directors, respectively, reprising their roles from Marvel's Spider-Man: Miles Morales (2020), with Horton describing the game as "full size, mature tone" in contrast to Miles Morales. Mary Kenney served as the game's writer with Spec Ops: The Line (2012) writer Walt Williams. Motion capture preparation had begun by April 2022, when lead animator Mike Yosh posted a photo of a motion capture soundstage on Twitter. In June 2023, Ratchet & Clank: Rift Apart (2021) co-writer Nick Folkman revealed on Twitter that he had been simultaneously involved as a writer on both Marvel's Spider-Man 2 and Marvel's Wolverine, and that he would be completely focused on the latter now that his work on the former game had been completed. Marvel's Spider-Man 2 creative director Bryan Intihar reconfirmed the game's shared continuity to the studio's Spider-Man games in October 2023, saying "they're all Earth-1048".

Sweet Baby Inc. announced in 2021 they will be working as a story consultation. In September 2024, Insomniac Games's core technology director Mike Fitzgerald confirmed that Marvel's Wolverine supports enhancements made by the PlayStation 5 Pro as they were implemented into their existing games for the console. Over the summer, Brian Horton left his role as creative director on the game to join The Initiative at Xbox Game Studios, briefly assuming the role of creative director on the Perfect Dark reboot prior to its cancellation and the studio's simultaneous closure in July 2025. Marcus Smith took over Horton's role, while Mike Daly replaced Christian as game director. The duo previously collaborated on Ratchet & Clank: Rift Apart (2021). Programmers on the team aimed to create a seamless player experience and restarted progress on mechanics that didn't meet expectations, like Wolverine's combat senses outside of battles. The game's cover art, which was revealed during a September 2025 State of Play, was designed in collaboration with comic artist Jock.

=== 2023 Rhysida hack ===
In December 2023, Insomniac Games was targeted in a ransomware attack that compromised various development documents and personal employee information. Among the surfaced materials, early in-game images and concept art featuring other characters were leaked online. The hackers, Rhysida, threatened to publish all procured images and resources obtained from the hack within seven days and they held an auction for the data with a starting price at 50 bitcoin (then-equivalent to US$2 million). Sony Interactive Entertainment (SIE) stated that they intended to investigate but did not anticipate the incident to affect other divisions of SIE or Sony as a whole. After Rhysida's deadline, company information, including employee data, model dumps and pre-production slates for various games in development, were published online. These materials included various production assets related to Marvel's Wolverine, such as vertical gameplay slices, animation and model tests, concept art, finalized plot and character details, as well as personal information concerning in-house staff and contract workers involved in the game's development, including the unintended reveal of the voice cast.

In the hours following the leak, early playable builds were similarly circulated online and made accessible by dataminers. SIE responded by issuing DMCA takedown notices through internet service providers against those who attempted to download the files. Insomniac Games issued a statement addressing the hack three days later, stating that the events took an "extremely distressing" emotional toll on the development teams involved in their upcoming projects, but that the data breach would not impact their development plans, including production on Marvel's Wolverine. They thanked their fans and the wider gaming community for "the outpouring of compassion and unwavering support", affirming to share more details regarding the game when the timing was right. The events of the hack and its consequences for the developer were met with widespread sympathy throughout the video game industry.

== Release ==
On September 24, 2025, during the State of Play, Sony announced that Marvel's Wolverine was set for release on PlayStation 5 in late 2026. On February 24, 2026, Insomniac confirmed the release date as September 15, 2026. Marvel's Wolverine was nominated for Most Anticipated Game at the Game Awards 2025. As part of a cross-promotion with Marvel Tōkon: Fighting Souls, the default Wolverine costume from Marvel Tōkon appears in Marvel's Wolverine, and vice-versa. Social media users reported that the version of the game released in Middle East regions had LGBTQ-based content censored.

== Reception ==
Reception

Aggregate scores
Aggregator	Score
Metacritic	75/100
OpenCritic	66% recommend

Review scores
Publication	Score
Eurogamer	3/5
Game Informer	8.5/10
GameSpot	6/10
GamesRadar+	3/5
IGN	6/10
Push Square	8/10
Shacknews	8/10
The Guardian	3/5
Video Games Chronicle	3/5

Marvel's Wolverine received "generally favorable" reviews, according to review aggregator website Metacritic. OpenCritic determined that 66% of critics recommended the game. The game's critical reception was inferior compared to Insomniac's games from the decade prior.

Eurogamer's Chris Tapsell said "Wolverine's characterisation is a bright spot in this otherwise underwhelming, old-school romp that reminds us how far action games have come."

Matt Miller's concluded his review on Game Informer with "Insomniac's latest action opus is beautiful to look at and listen to, and it plays like a dream. Whether you're a fan of the wily mutant lead or you simply gravitate to taut, tightly animated combat like what you'd find in God of War or Star Wars Jedi: Fallen Order, Wolverine is an intense and unrelenting ride. It may not hit a lot of notes, but like Logan himself, it nails the vitals where it counts."

Tamoor Hussain from GameSpot praised the game for its solid combat, appealing visual style with cinematic flair and compelling story with good character performances while criticizing it for the gameplay not doing much beyond the basics and lack of weight, flow and challenge for the combat.

"Marvel's Wolverine is a surprisingly average game let down by basic combat, a messy story, and the whelming feeling it could have all been a lot better. It's an enjoyable enough experience but one that lacks the depth, nuance and variety you'd expect." was Leon Hurley's consensus on GamesRadar+.

The verdict for Simon Cardy on IGN was "Marvel's Wolverine's slick and satisfying combat wears thin well before its conclusion, so much so that even its strong character work can't quite save it from being anything more than okay."

A strong linear and focused experience, fast-paced and gory combat, brutal takedowns and team combos, nice variety of locations, excellent vocal performances and outstanding visuals at times were the pros while relatively uninteresting narrative, some badly presented story elements and restrictive invisible walls were the cons on Liam Croft's review on Push Square.

Donovan Erskine on Shacknews's pros were satisfying melee-based combat, cinematic set pieces, impressive story performances, modular difficulty settings and snappy loading and scene transitions while his cons were story doesn't reach its potential, gameplay gets repetitive and not much compelling content outside of combat.

Keith Stuart from The Guardian said "Logan is well realised by Liam McIntyre and some exquisite character art, but there are lapses in narrative and emotional arcs and some of the combat feels like a chore."

Video Games Chronicle's Jordan Middler summed up the review by saying "Marvel's Wolverine is fine, but it fails to capture the spirit of the legendary character in the same way Insomniac did with Spider-Man. It's a game out of time, full of dated quest design and combat that excels in spectacle but not much else. Best-in-class visuals pull up the overall package, but this isn't the definitive Wolverine game I'd hoped for."

=== Sales and revenue ===
For the week ending September 20, Marvel's Wolverine debuted at number one on the sales chart in Switzerland and the physical sales chart in the United Kingdom. In Japan, Marvel's Wolverine debuted at number five on the physical sales chart for that week, selling 20,039 copies. Marvel's Wolverine soundtrack debuted at number 19 on the UK Official Classical Chart. In September, the game was the most-downloaded title on PlayStation 5 in the United States and Canada, and the 2nd most-downloaded game in Europe.

According to Circana, Marvel's Wolverine was the best-selling title in September, outselling NBA 2K27 and EA Sports FC 27. It ranked 11th among the best-selling games in the United States year to date. It also recorded the highest launch-month full-game dollar sales for a Sony-published title since Helldivers 2 in February 2024. Market research and data analysis firm Alinea Analytics estimated that Marvel’s Wolverine sold approximately 1.9 million copies during its first three days of release, with total sales during the period generating more than $130 million in revenue. According to market research firm Ampere Analysis, Marvel’s Wolverine was the second best-selling PlayStation 5 game in September, selling an estimated 2.16 million units since its release on September 15, 35% of which were physical copies, accounting for roughly 756,000 sales. In Europe, physical copies represented a larger share, making up 51% of total sales. The game has sold more than 2.4 million units as of November 4, 2026, according to Sony Interactive Entertainment.

=== Awards ===
Year	Award	Category	Result	Ref.
2025	The Game Awards 2025	Most Anticipated Game	Nominated	
2026	2026 Golden Joystick Awards	Best Lead Performer (Liam McIntyre)	Nominated	
2026	2026 Golden Joystick Awards	Best Supporting Performer (Troy Baker)	Nominated	
2026	The Game Awards 2026	Best Performance (Liam McIntyre)	Pending	
2026	The Game Awards 2026	Innovation in Accessibility	Pending	
2027	69th Annual Grammy Awards	Best Score Soundtrack for Video Games and Other Interactive Media	Pending	

== Future ==
The ransomware attack on Insomniac Games in December 2023 revealed that the studio was producing several Marvel video games, all in various stages of development. Marvel's Wolverine is planned as the first in a trilogy focused on the X-Men, similar to the Marvel's Spider-Man series. The hack confirmed a licensing deal between Insomniac Games, Sony Interactive Entertainment, and Marvel. Under this agreement, Insomniac would work with Marvel to produce X-Men video games. The deal includes restrictions: while X-Men characters can appear in other Marvel games, Marvel cannot announce any new X-Men games from other publishers for consoles, PC, or cloud streaming during the agreement. Other first-party platforms, like Xbox and Nintendo, cannot use X-Men-affiliated characters or elements as competitive advantages against PlayStation consoles for multiplatform Marvel games.
