= Bonebreaker =

Marvel Comics supervillain

Publication information
- Publisher: Marvel Comics
- First appearance: The Uncanny X-Men #229 (May 1988)
- Created by: Chris Claremont; Marc Silvestri

In-story information
- Species: Cyborg
- Team affiliations: Reavers
- Abilities: Cybernetic body, Robotic weaponry Augmented strength, stamina, and reflexes

Bonebreaker is a supervillain appearing in American comic books published by Marvel Comics.

Bonebreaker appears in the 2017 film Logan, played by Daniel Bernhardt.

== Publication history ==
He first appeared in The Uncanny X-Men #229 (May 1988) and was created by Chris Claremont and Marc Silvestri.

== Fictional character biography ==
Bonebreaker is the leader of the original Reavers, a gang of cyborgs residing in Australia. Following their defeat by the X-Men, Bonebreaker seeks out Donald Pierce and Lady Deathstrike to aid in rebuilding the Reavers and defeating the X-Men. At this point, Pierce takes over Bonebreaker's role as the Reavers' leader.

The Reavers attack Muir Island, where they battle the Muir Island X-Men and Freedom Force. After the Muir Island battle, Bonebreaker and the Reavers continue to attack various heroes and mutants. When Pierce creates Albert and Elsie-Dee as a trap for Wolverine, Bonebreaker accidentally gives Elsie-Dee the maximum artificial intelligence instead of that of a child. As a result, Elsie-Dee and Albert decide that Wolverine is noble and foil Pierce's plans.

Bonebreaker leads an attack on what he thinks is Wolverine, but is in actuality an alternate universe aged version of Logan. This attack kills several new-found friends of Logan. In response, Logan tears apart Bonebreaker and stabs him through the neck.

== Powers and abilities ==
Like the other members of the Reavers, Bonebreaker is a cyborg and has bionic implants that augment strength, stamina, and reflexes beyond the levels of a normal human.

Bonebreaker's legs have been replaced with a motorized chassis that drives on tank treads. It is outfitted with anti-aircraft weapons, missile launchers, and machine guns. Bonebreaker's upper torso can be removed from the chassis.

== Other versions ==
An alternate universe version of Bonebreaker appears in Ultimate Spider-Man #91. This version is a mutant cyborg with a snake-like body.

== In other media ==
=== Television ===
Bonebreaker appears in the X-Men: The Animated Series episode "Out of the Past".

=== Film ===
Bonebreaker appears in Logan, portrayed by Daniel Bernhardt.

=== Video games ===
- Bonebreaker appears in X-Men.
- Bonebreaker appears as a boss in The Punisher.
- Bonebreaker appears in Marvel Heroes.
