= Lady Deathstrike =

Marvel Comics fictional character

Yuriko Oyama Lady Deathstrike
- Lady Deathstrike on the textless variant cover of New X-Men #45 (February 2008). Art by Simone Bianchi, Simone Peruzzi, and Andrea Silvestri.

Publication information
- Publisher: Marvel Comics
- First appearance: As Yuriko Oyama: Daredevil #197 (August 1983); As Lady Deathstrike: Alpha Flight #33 (April 1986); As upgraded Lady Deathstrike: Uncanny X-Men #205 (May 1986)
- Created by: As Yuriko Oyama: Dennis O'Neil; William Johnson; As Lady Deathstrike: Bill Mantlo; Sal Buscema; As upgraded Lady Deathstrike: Chris Claremont; Barry Windsor-Smith

In-story information
- Species: Human cyborg
- Team affiliations: Sisterhood of Mutants; Reavers; Thunderbolts; Weapon X-Force; Wolverines; Oyama Heavy Industries
- Abilities: Superhuman strength, speed, agility, and reflexes; Adamantium skeleton and retractable claw nails; Ability to mentally interact with computers; Accelerated regenerative healing factor; Skilled martial artist; Skilled athlete

Lady Deathstrike (Yuriko Oyama), occasionally spelled Deathstryke, is a supervillain appearing in American comic books published by Marvel Comics. She is an enemy of the X-Men, especially Wolverine.

Her father, Lord Dark Wind, created the adamantium-bonding process that Weapon X would later subject Wolverine to. A self-styled warrior, Lady Deathstrike hired the villain Spiral's "body shoppe" to bond adamantium to her skeleton in addition to other cyber-genetic enhancements. She has worked as a mercenary and assassin and feels a need to prove herself by killing Wolverine. Lady Deathstrike is the sister of human crime boss Lord Deathstrike. She, along with former X-Men members Mystique, Sabretooth, Domino, Warpath, and Old Man Logan formed a team called Weapon X-Men, but later changed to Weapon X-Force after Logan and Warpath left with Omega Red.

A mutant version of Lady Deathstrike, played by Kelly Hu and without any of Deathstrike's backstory, appeared as a brainwashed henchman of William Stryker in the 2003 film X2. A variant of this version, played by Jade Lye, appears as a henchman of Cassandra Nova in the 2024 film Deadpool & Wolverine.

== Publication history ==
She first appeared as Yuriko Oyama in Daredevil #197 (August 1983) and later as Lady Deathstrike in Alpha Flight #33 (April 1986).

She was created by writer Dennis O'Neil and artist William Johnson (Daredevil #197). Writer Bill Mantlo and artist Sal Buscema designed her samurai appearance (Alpha Flight #33). Writer Chris Claremont added defining characteristics such as her cyborg abilities, while Barry Windsor-Smith designed her cyborg appearance (Uncanny X-Men #205, May 1986).

== Fictional character biography ==
Yuriko's second costume

=== Early life in Japan ===
Yuriko Oyama was born in Osaka, Japan. Her father was Lord Dark Wind (Kenji Oyama), a Japanese crime lord and criminal scientist who created the process which bonds adamantium to bone. A former Japanese kamikaze pilot during World War II, Kenji's face bears horrible scars from a failed suicide attack on an American battleship. Still ashamed by his failure decades later, he scarred the faces of Yuriko, her brother Kazuo, and an unnamed brother in a ritual design. Both brothers later died while in their father's service.

Yuriko teamed up with Daredevil to free her lover Kira from her father's servitude and to take vengeance on her father for her scarring and the death of her brothers. She guided Daredevil to Lord Dark Wind's private island in search of Bullseye. When Yuriko killed Lord Dark Wind, the devoted Kira chose suicide to honor his master.

=== Wolverine, X-Men, and Alpha Flight ===
Distraught, Yuriko belatedly embraced her father's ideals and sought to track down whoever dishonored him, thereby restoring Japan's honor. She adopted a costumed identity as a samurai warrior. She attempted to find Bullseye with an adamantium tracking device, intending to get revenge on him for betraying her father and retrieve the adamantium in his bones for study. Instead, the device led to Wolverine whose skeleton had also been bonded with adamantium. Deathstrike sought to kill him to right the wrong of the theft of her father's theories and to restore her family's honor; however, she and her followers were defeated by Wolverine and Vindicator of Alpha Flight. She went to the Mojoverse and sought Spiral's "body shoppe" where she received extensive cybernetic enhancements including adamantium bones and claws. As a cyborg, she became a professional criminal, and joined forces with former Hellfire Club mercenaries-turned-cyborgs Cole, Macon, and Reese. The four went on to join the Reavers, a team of cyborgs led by Donald Pierce.

Lady Deathstrike encountered Wolverine shortly after Magneto removed the adamantium from his skeleton. When Logan unsheathed his natural bone claws to fight her, Deathstrike concluded that there was no honor to be gained from fighting him and so ended their vendetta.

=== Civil War ===
Following her confrontation with Rogue and Sunfire, Lady Deathstrike resurfaced as a member of the Thunderbolts and was assigned to pursue the Secret Avengers, who resisted the Superhuman Registration Act. She participated in the final battle of the Civil War in Times Square, New York City, and was sent to Negative Zone Prison Alpha.

=== Messiah Complex ===
Lady Deathstrike returns during the Messiah Complex storyline, where she battles X-23. Having allied with the Purifiers to destroy mutant-kind, Lady Deathstrike leads the new Reavers team against the New X-Men, gravely wounding Hellion in the process. She appears again in pursuit of Cable and Hope Summers, and is nearly killed by X-23.

=== Sisterhood of Mutants ===
Lady Deathstrike was apparently saved from death due to the actions of Spiral, as she was later seen under repair in Spiral's Body Shoppe when Madelyne Pryor approached Spiral with an invitation of membership in her Sisterhood of Mutants. Despite not originally being approached to join the Sisterhood, Lady Deathstrike accepted Pryor's offer nonetheless.

=== Ends of the Earth ===
During the Ends of the Earth storyline, Lady Deathstrike appeared in one of Doctor Octopus's facilities in Australia. When Kangaroo entered the facility, Lady Deathstrike ambushed and apparently killed him with a claw swipe.

=== Rejoining the Reavers ===
Lady Deathstrike's consciousness was uploaded in the body of Colombian teenager Ana Cortes and established a symbiotic relationship with Ana's consciousness. Deathstrike attacked Karima Shapandar to retrieve the Omega Sentinel technology, but retreated after Shapandar shot her. Deathstrike and Typhoid Mary argued with Sublime about his sister Arkea and learned that there was more than one living piece of Arkea, as the one they had was dead and not viable. Mary knocked Sublime unconscious and escaped with Deathstrike. Deathstrike and Mary made their way to Norway, where they found a powerless Amora.

Amora brought Deathstrike and Mary to the location of the Arkea meteorite for Mary to renegotiate the terms of her hire and become partners. Deathstrike said it was not just a partnership, but the formation of a new Sisterhood of Mutants. The live Arkea took possession of Ana's friend Reiko and then empowered Deathstrike, Mary, and Amora. Deathstrike and her Sisterhood managed to escape the X-Men and Monet, and Arkea activated several Sentinels under the ocean. The mental conflict between Ana and Yuriko made Lady Deathstrike increasingly unstable. Ana told the X-Men the Sisterhood's location after becoming increasingly concerned about Arkea's bold moves such as having Amora resurrect Selene.

Ana tried to get Typhoid Mary to kill her, but Mary refused. After Arkea asked Ana to participate in the procedure to resurrect Madelyne Pryor, Ana instead died by suicide to prevent Arkea from using her further. In response, Arkea removed Yuriko's consciousness from Ana's body and placed it in Reiko's body along with Arkea's own. After the X-Men's confrontation with the Sisterhood, Karima Shapandar left the X-Men to team up with Sabra and investigate the Cortes crime family. Though Arkea was destroyed by the X-Men, Lady Deathstrike's consciousness survived in Reiko's body.

The Reavers later arrived in Killhorn Falls with Lady Deathstrike and attempted to hunt down Logan and end him. As the Reavers attacked Killhorn Falls, Old Man Logan single-handedly killed all the Reaver soldiers and confronted Lady Deathstrike before saving Maureen. After being wounded multiple times, Logan managed to defeat Lady Deathstrike, as she started limping away when Logan blacked out. Thinking that he failed to protect Maureen from the chaos, Logan decided to set off to find Lady Deathstrike.

While in hiding during the "Weapons of Mutant Destruction" storyline, Lady Deathstrike was discovered and captured by the new Weapon X. While held in their captivity, she was experimented on. This experiment led to her nanotechnology being used in the creation of Weapon H.

== Personality and themes ==
Psychologist Suzana Flores argues that Lady Deathstrike evinces traits of obsessive compulsive disorder in her drive to obtain Wolverine's adamantium. As Flores characterizes it, Lady Deathstrike "'needs' the adamantium to credibly establish or validate her self-worth," but even if she were to achieve this, her personality would lead her to "find some other victim or idea over which to obsess."

== Powers and abilities ==
Lady Deathstrike was transformed into a cyborg by Spiral and the "Body Shop" using alien technology of Mojo's dimension. She has superhuman strength, speed, stamina, durability, and agility. Deathstrike's skeleton has been artificially laced with adamantium, rendering her skeletal structure physically unbreakable. 12-inch (300 mm) long adamantium claws were installed to replace all of her fingers on both hands. These nails are as indestructible as her skeleton and additionally capable of slicing through virtually any substance other than adamantium itself and Captain America's shield. These claws may be extended in order to double their length. She can also interface with computers, allowing direct data access to her brain's memory centers. She is a trained assassin and skilled in various Asian martial arts.

Before she received her cybernetic enhancements, Deathstrike used a katana that was electromagnetically tempered and sheathed in energy, making it as durable as adamantium and able to cut through most substances. She has also used shuriken, nunchakus, a high-powered, long-range blaster that fires armor-piercing explosive bullets, and wristbands containing adamantium detectors. She also wore modified Japanese battle armor, which could withstand even superhuman blows. Her items were constructed by weapon smiths of Lord Dark Wind's organization.

Deathstrike later received an upgrade that provides her with a kind of "cybernetic healing factor" that functions similarly, although not as efficiently, to Wolverine's.

Lady Deathstrike is fluent in both English and Japanese, and an accomplished pilot of various air and sea-craft.

== Reception ==
=== Accolades ===
- In 2009, IGN ranked Lady Deathstrike 78th in their "Top 100 Comic Book Vilains" list.
- In 2019, CBR.com ranked Lady Deathstrike 6th in their "Marvel: Old Man Logan Villains" list.
- In 2019, IGN ranked Lady Deathstrike 20th in their "Top 25 Marvel Villains" list.
- In 2021, Screen Rant included Lady Deathstrike in their "10 Marvel Characters Fans Would Love To See In Marvel's Wolverine" list.
- In 2022, CBR.com ranked Lady Deathstrike 9th in their "10 Deadliest Female Villains In Marvel Comics" list.
- In 2022, Sara Century of Collider included Lady Deathstrike in her "10 X-Men Villains We Want to See in the Animated Series Reboot" list.

== Other versions ==
Cover to Ultimate X-Men #60. Art by Stuart Immonen.

=== Amalgam ===
Lady Talia, a composite character based on Lady Deathstrike and DC Comics character Talia al Ghul, appears in the Amalgam Comics one-shot Dark Claw Adventures.

=== Ultimate Marvel ===
An alternate universe version of Yuriko Oyama / Lady Deathstrike from Earth-1610 appears in Ultimate X-Men. This version is a former friend of Storm who was rendered paraplegic after being hit by a truck, with Storm believing her to have been killed. Abraham Cornelius of Weapon X heals and enhances Oyama's body using adamantium and Wolverine's DNA sample. As Lady Deathstrike, Oyama seeks revenge on Wolverine while also targeting Storm.

=== Ultimate Universe ===
An alternate universe version of Lady Deathstrike from Earth-6160 appears in Ultimate Wolverine.

=== Wolverine Noir ===
An alternate universe version of Yuriko Oyama from Earth-90214 appears in Wolverine Noir. This version is a civilian who is later killed by Rose, Logan's ex-girlfriend.

== In other media ==
=== Television ===
Lady Deathstrike as she appears in X-Men: The Animated Series.

- Lady Deathstrike appears in the X-Men: The Animated Series episode "Out of the Past", voiced by Jane Luk. This version was previously in a romantic relationship with Wolverine before joining the Reavers and becoming a cyborg to avenge the death of her father, Professor Oyama.
  - Lady Deathstrike appears in the X-Men '97 episode "Weapon X, Lies, and DVDs", voiced by Erika Ishii.

=== Film ===
Kelly Hu as Yuriko Oyama in X2 (2003).

- Yuriko Oyama appears in X2, portrayed by Kelly Hu. This version is a brainwashed mutant and personal assistant to William Stryker.
- Lady Deathstrike appears in Hulk Vs Wolverine, voiced by Janyse Jaud. This version is a member of Team X.
- Lady Deathstrike appears in Deadpool & Wolverine, portrayed by Jade Lye.

=== Video games ===
- Lady Deathstrike appears as a playable character in X-Men: Next Dimension, voiced by Gwendoline Yeo.
- Lady Deathstrike appears as the final boss of X2: Wolverine's Revenge, voiced again by Gwendoline Yeo.
- Lady Deathstrike appears as a boss in X-Men Legends II: Rise of Apocalypse, voiced by Kim Mai Guest. This version is an associate of Apocalypse.
- Lady Deathstrike appears as a boss in X-Men: The Official Game, voiced by Vyvan Pham. This version is a student of the Silver Samurai and an agent of Hydra.
- Lady Deathstrike appears as a boss in Wolverine: Adamantium Rage.
- Lady Deathstrike appears as a mini-boss in Marvel Ultimate Alliance 2, voiced by Jocelyn Blue.
- Lady Deathstrike appears in Strider Hiryu's ending in Ultimate Marvel vs. Capcom 3.
- Lady Deathstrike appears as a boss in Marvel Heroes, voiced by Minae Noji.
- Lady Deathstrike appears as a playable character in Marvel Strike Force.
- Lady Deathstrike appears in Marvel's Deadpool VR, voiced by Kelly Hu.
- Yuriko Oyama / Deathstrike appears as a boss in Marvel's Wolverine, voiced by Jolene Kim. This version is the leader of the Hand.
