= U.N. Squadron =

1989 video game

- Arcade flyer
- Developer: Capcom
- Publishers: Capcom; U.S. Gold (computers)
- Director: Yoshiki Okamoto
- Composer: Manami Matsumae
- Platforms: Arcade, Amiga, Amstrad CPC, Atari ST, Commodore 64, Super NES, ZX Spectrum
- Release: Arcade; August 1989; SNES: JP: July 26, 1991; NA: September 1991; EU: December 1992
- Genre: Scrolling shooter
- Modes: Single-player, multiplayer
- Arcade system: CP System

U.N. Squadron, released in Japan as Area 88 (Note: Japanese: エリア88, Hepburn: Eria Hachi-Jū-Hachi), is a 1989 side-scrolling shooter video game developed and published by Capcom for arcades. It was based on the manga series of the same name, though the North American release omits all references to the manga. Their mission is to stop a terrorist group known as Project 4. It was ported to multiple platforms including the Super Nintendo Entertainment System and was followed by a spiritual successor, Carrier Air Wing.

== Gameplay ==
Pilot selection screen in U.N. Squadron

The game is a typical side scrolling shooter, going against the trend of other Capcom shooters, such as 1942 and 1943: The Battle of Midway, which are vertically scrolling shooters. Like other Capcom shooters, the player has an energy bar that is consumed over the course of a single life as the player sustains damage. This trait is highly uncommon among other comparable arcade-style shooters which normally use a system of reserve lives, where one of which is lost upon a single enemy hit. Before entering a level, the player can purchase special weapons or added defenses in the shop. The player earns money to buy weapons by destroying enemy planes and vehicles during levels and, when the level is finished, any unused weapons are converted back into money.

The player can choose between three mercenary pilots: Shin Kazama, Mickey Simon, and Greg Gates. Each pilot flies a specific plane and has slightly different capabilities.

In the Super NES version, each pilot can use a range of planes. All pilots start out with $3000 and the basic F8 Crusader, and can buy other aircraft and weapons as they progress.

== Development ==
Capcom director Yoshiki Okamoto commented that the game was part of a broader strategy of Capcom at the time to appeal to a wider audience by using established characters from other media, as their original characters could be too niche. In addition to Area 88, he cited games based on Willow and Tenchi wo Kurau as part of this strategy.

== Release ==
Area 88 was ported to the home console Super NES and released in Japan on July 26, 1991. In North America and Europe it was re-titled U.N. Squadron by Capcom. The illustration for the U.N. Squadron poster was created by well known illustrator Marc Ericksen, the illustrator of the covers to Capcom's other games Mega Man 2 and Strider. A version for the Capcom Power System Changer was planned and previewed but never released.

== Reception ==
Reception

Aggregate score
Aggregator	Score
GameRankings	87% (SNES)

Review score
Publication	Score
Mean Machines	94% (SNES)

In Japan, Game Machine listed U.N. Squadron on their September 15, 1989 issue as being the sixth most-successful table arcade unit of the month. In North America, it was a major hit, becoming the top-grossing software conversion kit on the RePlay arcade charts in February 1990.

Upon its home console release, the Japanese gaming publication Weekly Famitsu gave the Super Famicom version a score of 28 out of 40.

Entertainment Weekly gave the Super NES version of the game an A, and picked the game as the #12 greatest game available in 1991.

Super Gamer gave the SNES version an overall score of 93%, commending the graphics, aircraft selection, gameplay, and sound.

=== Accolades ===
IGN ranked U.N. Squadron 37th on its "Top 100 Super NES Games" list, which made it the highest ranking side scroller shooter game on that list. In 2018, Complex listed U.N. Squadron 23rd on its "The Best Super Nintendo Games of All Time" list and called the game the best side scrolling shooter on the SNES. In 1995, Total! rated the game 63rd on their Top 100 SNES Games list.
