= Donald Pierce =

- Donald Pierce, art by Andy Park

Publication information
- Publisher: Marvel Comics
- First appearance: The Uncanny X-Men #132 (April 1980)
- Created by: Chris Claremont; John Byrne

In-story information
- Alter ego: Donald Pierce
- Species: Human cyborg
- Team affiliations: Purifiers; Reavers; Hellfire Club
- Notable aliases: White Bishop, White King, Cyclops
- Abilities: Mechanical genius; Immense wealth; Cyborg body grants: Superhuman strength, durability, stamina, and reflexes; Bionic senses; Ability to create numerous types of energy; Technoforming; Mechanical regeneration; Advanced technology

Donald Pierce is a supervillain appearing in American comic books published by Marvel Comics. Created by writer Chris Claremont and artist John Byrne, the character first appeared in The Uncanny X-Men #132 (April 1980). Pierce is typically depicted as a wealthy yet genocidal businessman who possesses a cyborg body and an intense hatred of mutants, bringing him into repeated conflict with the X-Men.

The character made his live-action debut in the 2017 film Logan, portrayed by Boyd Holbrook.

== Publication history ==
Donald Pierce first appeared in The Uncanny X-Men #132 (April 1980), and was created by Chris Claremont and John Byrne. Byrne modeled Pierce's name and appearance after Donald Sutherland. The character's last name comes from Benjamin Franklin "Hawkeye" Pierce, Sutherland's character in the 1970 film M*A*S*H.

== Fictional character biography ==
Donald Pierce was born in Philadelphia, Pennsylvania. He first appears as a high-ranking member of the Inner Circle of the Hellfire Club, where he holds the position of White Bishop. However, Pierce is in fact a genocidal mutant hater, and has only joined the Hellfire Club to kill the Inner Circle's other members, all of whom are mutants. In addition to hating mutants, Pierce is also bigoted towards certain nationalities and harbors a sense of self-loathing due to his cyborg status, referring to himself as "only half a man". He is the CEO and principal shareholder of Pierce-Consolidated Mining, and operates out of a mining and laboratory complex in Cameron, Kentucky. Pierce and his mercenaries kidnap Professor X and Tessa in a plot against the Hellfire Club and the X-Men, but he is defeated by the Professor despite a device shielding him against telepathic attacks. Pierce is handed over to Tessa of the Hellfire Club, expelled from the Inner Circle, and taken to a secret holding facility at Shaw Industries.

=== The Reavers ===
Many months later, Pierce is violently liberated from the holding facility. Though his rescuers are never explicitly identified, he resurfaces alongside three members of the Reavers, a band of cyborg criminals which Pierce claims to have built and assembled, and which had been all but wiped out by the X-Men. The four of them ally with Lady Deathstrike and three Hellfire Club mercenaries (Cole, Macon, and Reese) who were cybernetically enhanced by Pierce. Under Pierce's leadership, the new Reavers are dedicated to exterminating mutants, with highest priority given to the X-Men and Sebastian Shaw (CEO of Shaw Industries).

The Upstarts' members Trevor Fitzroy sends reprogrammed Sentinels to destroy the Reavers, as they are a threat to mutants and Pierce is worth a lot of "points" in the deadly game the Upstarts play. Pierce is apparently killed by the Sentinels. Pierce later resurfaces, starts an anti-mutant hate group, and enlists several members; revealing a plot to take militant terrorist actions against mutants and thwarted by the X-Men, he is beaten by Wolverine in hand-to-hand combat.

Pierce would remain with the Hellfire Club for some time, eventually showing a more adversarial relationship with Shaw as the current Black King. He heads out to an outpost in Switzerland, believed to be Apocalypse's stronghold, to obtain Apocalypse's power and secure his position within the Hellfire Club's inner circle. Pierce releases a techno-organic entity created by Apocalypse, who gravely injures him. Pierce survives, but his injuries cost him much of his remaining flesh, revealing his head to be his only remaining fully organic component.

=== As a Purifier ===
Pierce next tries to take over Sebastian Shaw's new Hellfire Club, launching an attack and slashing Shaw's chest. Though Shaw is left critically injured and later needed to be hospitalized, Shaw is able to punch off Pierce's head. Pierce later is forcibly recruited into the Purifiers' ranks and infected with the Technarch transmode virus. Being under the control of the mutant-hunting robot Bastion, he shows his mutant target: the newly formed Young X-Men.

=== Young X-Men ===
He appears in a nightmare of the precognitive mutant Blindfold, battling a not yet formed team of X-Men and killing one of their number. Pierce himself recruited this team using an image inducer to pose as Cyclops. His reasons for recruiting these mutants as "X-Men" are not entirely clear, however, it appears that his primary focus is to eliminate the Hellfire Club's current Lord Imperial Roberto da Costa and former New Mutants allies. He also hires Ink to deliver Dani and Blindfold to him, misleading him. Following the confrontation with the Young X-Men, his face is scoured by Dust. Blindfold's prediction is later proven correct when Wolf Cub is killed.

Pierce is taken into the X-Men's custody. Pierce and Dust have frequent conversations while he is imprisoned, despite his vocal hatred of mutants and derogatory remarks toward Dust's faith in Islam, noting that his attitude reminds Dust of home. Pierce informs Dust that Ink is not a mutant, which is later discovered by the rest of the team.

=== Second Coming ===
After receiving the green light from Bastion to proceed with their plan, Pierce provokes an explosion that decimates all the X-Men's jets and the Blackbirds. Pierce stands amid the debris, and muses to the X-Men that he is sorry that he will not live to witness the decimation of the mutant race. Cyclops eliminates him with an optic blast.

Pierce was seen alive again with the rest of the Hellfire Club's Inner Circle on a cruise reserved for super criminals and cabals. He along with his compatriots were seen at a gambling den aboard the vessel as the Avengers Unity Division were searching for Red Skull.

=== Hunt for Wolverine ===
Shortly after his return as seen during the "Hunt for Wolverine" storyline, Pierce and the Reavers are left in dire straits after failing a series of missions. The Reavers attempt to dig up Wolverine's body for money, but find that it has been removed from his grave. After a lengthy battle with the X-Men, Pierce and the others are rounded up and deposited into the care of Alpha Flight.

=== O*N*E Conscription ===
Due to lack of resources and proper jurisdiction, Pierce and the Reavers are turned over to the Office of National Emergency (O*N*E). Pierce and select members of his crew are forced to impart their technologies and mechanical skills into building up Robert Callahan's mutant-hunting equipment, the rest of whom had been given the kill order by the corrupt commander to his soldiers. This soon made public news and garnered the attention of the X-Men.

The remains of Pierce's crew, led by Havok and Warpath, launch an assault on the Location 22 base camp of O*N*E, who had been experimenting on their friends. The Reavers obtain a nanite-coded module created by Bastion that allows them to assimilate and incorporate technology into themselves. The Reavers assimilate a group of Sentinels and attack the X-Mansion, but are thwarted by O*N*E* and taken back into custody.

=== A.I. Uprising ===
During the Iron Man 2020 storyline, Albert is directed by Tyger Tiger to Pierce's company Reavers Universal Robotics in Madripoor and is confronted by Bonebreaker and the Reavers. After Albert subdues the Reavers, Pierce states that he sold Elsie-Dee's parts to other criminal groups. Albert manages to recover Elsie-Dee's parts and reassemble her, causing the criminals to swear vengeance against him. Pierce and the Reavers attack Albert and Elsie-Dee, but they escape after being smuggled out of Madripoor by Kimura.

== Powers and abilities ==
Donald Pierce is a cyborg with artificial limbs which provide him with superhuman strength. His speed, reflexes and agility are also inhumanly high, attributes which are derived from his replacement extremities. His body has great resistance to damage and even if it is destroyed, as long as his head is intact he will probably survive. Before and after securing some of Cable's technology from the future and incorporating it into himself, he boasted a wide cadre of skills and abilities, such as generating electric currents. He also boasts bionic optics, which feed into his mind to memorize and relay information, giving him an eidetic memory and photography vision. Pierce can plastically morph his arms into various weapons, including cannons and razor claws.

Pierce's brain possesses implants that render him immune to psionic infraction thanks to various brain implants for telepathic resistance, also having the ability to turn psionic assaults against the attacker to a limited degree. He also boasted rocket-powered flight capabilities, enabling Pierce to fly at unknown speeds for prolonged periods.

Aside from his physical advantages, Donald Pierce is a genius in robotics, cybernetics and electronics. In these fields he has developed technology that exceeds that of conventional science by approximately two centuries. He is also a seasoned leader with vast financial and human resources (a prerequisite for membership in the Hellfire Club). He is a college graduate in geological engineering and business administration, and is an accomplished strategist and business administrator. Pierce is a fair hand-to-hand combatant, but mainly relies on his cyborg strength and is more prone to letting others fight his battles for him rather than fight on the front lines. In later publishing after coming under the services of the Office of National Emergency, Pierce as with all of his Reavers gained the ability to possess and assimilate technology.

== Reception ==
- In 2017, WhatCulture ranked Donald Pierce 9th in their "10 Most Evil X-Men Villains" list.

== Other versions ==
=== Age of Apocalypse ===
An alternate universe version of Donald Pierce appears in Age of Apocalypse. This version is the leader of the Reavers, a band of human assassins who were enhanced by Apocalypse's techno-organic virus, becoming cyborgs with the ability to assimilate organic and non-organic material to mutate themselves. After Pierce is killed in battle with Weapon X, the X-Terminators create a series of clones of him for their own ends.

=== House of M ===
An alternate universe version of Donald Pierce appears in House of M. This version is a member of the Human Liberation Front, a human resistance group that is labeled as a terrorist group by the House of M.

== In other media ==
=== Television ===
- Donald Pierce appears in the X-Men: The Animated Series four-part episode "The Dark Phoenix", voiced by Walker Boone. This version is younger than his comic counterpart and is a member of the Inner Circle Club.
- Donald Pierce appears in the Wolverine and the X-Men three-part episode "Foresight". This version is a mutant and member of the Inner Circle who is capable of emitting energy blasts. He joins the Inner Circle in an attempt to harness the Phoenix Force's power for themselves, only to be killed by falling debris while unsuccessfully transferring it from Jean Grey to the Stepford Cuckoos.

=== Film ===
Donald Pierce appears in Logan, portrayed by Boyd Holbrook. This version is the leader of Zander Rice's Reavers, chief of security for the corporation Alkali-Transigen, and Laura's handler who claims to be a "fan" of Logan. After Laura and several mutant children escape from Transigen, Pierce leads the Reavers in an attempt to get them back, only to be killed by them.
