= List of Marvel Comics characters: E =

== Earth Sentry ==
Earth Sentry (John Foster) is a character appearing in American comic books published by Marvel Comics. He was created by Tom DeFalco and Ron Frenz, and first appeared in A-Next #2 (1999) in the MC2 universe.

When John and his father Bill were investigating a UFO crash site, they discovered a Kree space probe. Upon nearing the ship, the automated defenses activated, and a robotic sentry was released. Bill activated a distress signal which was picked up by Mainframe and the rest of A-Next.

When the heroes arrived, a Sentry robot attacked them. Thunderstrike's sonic blasts and J2's superstrength were not slowing the attacker. Stinger was able to blind the robot's optic sensors with sting darts, providing an opening for John to enter the ship and try to turn off the robotic sentry. When John made contact with the ship's console, a strange energy surge ripped through the ship's computers and struck him. The energy wave reconfigured John's DNA, making him genetically similar to a Kree warrior. Finding himself clad in a green-and-white costume, similar to the original costume of Mar-Vell, John discovered that he had acquired great powers.

John confronted and defeated the Sentry, and stated that he would become an "Earth Sentry" to protect his planet from invaders. He politely declined membership with A-Next, but when the team was later captured by the Revengers, Earth Sentry returned and used his powers to help A-Next defeat the invaders. He then accepted membership with A-Next.

Earth Sentry possesses superhuman strength and durability, due to his altered human/Kree DNA. His costume has wrist-mounted blasters that can fire photonic energy blasts. Rocket boosters on his belt allow him to fly.

== Earthquake ==
Earthquake is the name of two characters appearing in American comic books published by Marvel Comics.

=== First Earthquake ===
The first Earthquake first appeared in Uncanny X-Men #137 (September 1980), and was created by Chris Claremont and John Byrne.

Earthquake is a member of the Shi'ar Imperial Guard and a reptilian humanoid with the ability to manipulate silicate matter.

=== Second Earthquake ===
An alien of the same species as Earthquake took up the Earthquake mantle. He possesses identical abilities to his predecessor.

=== Earthquake in other media ===
The original Earthquake makes non-speaking cameo appearances in X-Men: The Animated Series.

== Ebon Samurai ==
Ebon Samurai

Publication information
- Publisher: Marvel Comics
- First appearance: Alpha Flight #9 vol. 3 (January, 2005)
- Created by: Scott Lobdell and Clayton Henry

In-story information
- Alter ego: Kioshi Keishicho
- Species: Undead human (yūrei)
- Team affiliations: Big Hero 6
- Abilities: Undead warrior with cursed samurai long sword Superb hand-to-hand combatant

Ebon Samurai (Kioshi Keishicho) is a character appearing in American comic books published by Marvel Comics. His first appearance was in Alpha Flight #9 (2005) and was created by Scott Lobdell and Clayton Henry.

Once assigned to the Imperial Guard of Japan, the elite branch of the National Police Agency responsible for protecting the Emperor, career police officer Captain Kioshi Keishicho was present years ago during an assassination attempt by the international terrorist organization Hydra. Although the Emperor was not harmed in the attack, Keishicho was killed by Silver Samurai (Kenuichio Harada), who was affiliated with Hydra at the time.

Following his funeral rites, Keishicho's soul descended to Yomi, the Shinto nether realm, where he was confronted by Amatsu-Mikaboshi, the god of primordial evil. Sensing Keishicho's unsatiated thirst for vengeance, Amatsu-Mikaboshi offered to allow him to return to the mortal realm to exact revenge upon the man responsible for his death. Unaware of the strings attached to Amatsu-Mikaboshi's deal, Keishicho readily accepted. However, Keishicho was bonded to a suit of ebony armor modeled after that worn by the Silver Samurai. In addition, the katana sword he now wielded was mystically bonded to the essence of a shinma demon, which subconsciously reminded him of the debt owed to Amatsu-Mikaboshi. Struggling to maintain a semblance of humanity and resist the shinma demon's influence, Keishicho began to investigate the whereabouts of the Silver Samurai, hoping to dispatch him as soon as possible so his soul could finally be at peace. Hearing that his target is affiliated with Big Hero 6, Keishicho infiltrates the team's Tokyo headquarters, only to learn that the Silver Samurai had since parted ways with the team and was presumed dead. After a brief altercation, Keishicho explains his situation to Big Hero 6 and joins the team, believing he had no other purpose to serve now that Silver Samurai was dead.

After learning that the Silver Samurai is still alive, Ebon Samurai leaves Big Hero 6 to continue the pursuit of his murderer. Upon learning that Silver Samurai had become the bodyguard of the Japanese prime minister, Ebon Samurai abandons his quest for revenge, realizing that murdering Silver Samurai would constitute a betrayal of his country.

Ebon Samurai's primary weapon is his katana, a traditional samurai long sword, which is mystically bonded to a shinma demon whose dark essence engulfs the sword's blade. He can use the sword, so enhanced, to slice through any known substance except adamantium. However, the demon's presence also corrupts Ebon Samurai's soul whenever he wields the katana. His offensive arsenal also includes a shorter wakizashi sword and sharpened, hand-held shuriken blades. Ebon Samurai's armor is constructed of an unknown metal native to Yomi and has enough articulation in the appropriate areas so as not to impede his movements. Ebon Samurai is trained in investigatory procedure and bushido (the samurai code of conduct), having learned both in Japan's National Police Academy. However, since his resurrection as an Earth-bound revenant, Ebon Samurai is prone to sudden outbursts of rage and violence whenever Amatsu-Mikaboshi's influence becomes too strong to repress.

=== Reception of Ebon Samurai ===
In 2020, CBR.com ranked Ebon Samurai 5th in their "Marvel Comics: Ranking Every Member Of Big Hero 6 From Weakest To Most Powerful" list.

== Eduardo ==
Eduardo (last name unrevealed) is a character appearing in American comic books published by Marvel Comics. The character, created by Brandon Montclare, Amy Reeder, and Marco Failla, first appeared in Moon Girl and Devil Dinosaur #1 (November 2015).

Eduardo is one of Lunella Lafayette's classmates who, along with Ali and Zoe, frequently interact with her despite not understanding her intelligence. Eduardo, recognizable for his Lisa Simpson-esque hair, became famous among the other students because he claimed to have seen Taylor Swift on Yancy Street. He usually filled out the role of being the one who stated the obvious about Lunella's exploits as Moon Girl and Devil Dinosaur and would sometimes be in the middle of the action, acting totally unfazed by what was happening around him. At one point, Lunella ended up in an alternate dimension where she encountered alternate versions of herself and Devil named Devil Girl and Moon Dinosaur, and met an alternate version of Eduardo and Zoe, the former of whom claimed to be the smartest boy in the world.

=== Eduardo in other media ===
Eduardo appears in Moon Girl and Devil Dinosaur, voiced by Michael Cimino. This version admires Lunella Lafayette, feeling that she is the only one who understands him. Following minor appearances in the first season, he develops a crush on her and starts to view Marvin Ellis / Mel-Varr as a rival for her affections in the second season. Later in the latter season, he confesses his feelings to Lunella, who politely turns him down. Nonetheless, Eduardo develops a crush on her alter ego Moon Girl.

== Sara Ehret ==
Sara Ehret was the first character known as Jackpot in Marvel Comics. When she was a pregnant scientist at Phelcorp (a subsidiary of Oscorp) working on gene therapy to cure Parkinson's disease, she was accidentally exposed to "Lot 777". The virus rewrote the DNA in her cells leaving her in a coma for four months. Coming out of her coma, Ehret went on to have her child Madeline with no complications. However, when her family came under threat by falling debris she displayed superhuman strength to save them. Taking the name "Jackpot" and designing her costume after the catchphrase of her favourite soap opera character, played by Mary Jane Watson, Jackpot went on to train and become a government sanctioned Initiative superhero for New York City.

Alana Jobson later becomes the second Jackpot, paying Ehret for the use of the Jackpot identity and license. After Jobson's death, Ehret reclaims the Jackpot identity and later comes into conflict with Boomerang and Rose, who learn her identity. Under Rose's orders, Boomerang kills Ehret's husband. To protect her daughter and give her the chance to have a normal life, Ehret vanishes once again and later resurfaces, using Alana Jobson's name as an alias.

== Eldrac ==
Eldrac is an Inhuman who started out as a politician for a minor faction within their population. When he underwent Terrigenesis, Eldrac was transformed into a large immobile construct with the ability to teleport others. While investigating a vessel of unknown origin on the Blue Area of the Moon, the Fantastic Four are greeted by the Inhuman Dal Damoc, who explained that the vessel was the Universal City and was the one who showed them Eldrac who enabled them passage to the Universal Inhumans. The Kymellian Queen Onomi Whitemane of the Universal Inhumans sent the Light Brigade into Eldrac so that he can send them into the Negative Zone.

During the Inhumanity storyline, Eldrac is hurled to Battery Park following the destruction of Attilan. After learning of Eldrac's survival, Medusa and her handmaiden Eljea arrive at Battery Park to collect Eldrac. After speaking to the S.H.I.E.L.D. agents, Medusa apologizes to Eldrac for getting involved in Black Bolt's plan. Medusa then has Eldrac teleport her to Black Bolt. When Eldrac does so, Medusa is instead teleported to where Inferno is battling Lash.

=== Eldrac in other media ===
Eldrac appears in Inhumans, voiced by Moses Goods.

== Electro ==
Electro is the name of several characters from Marvel Comics.

=== Robot ===
The first comics character using the Electro alias name was the robot super hero Electro, who possessed superhuman strength and could run at 100 miles per hour. He starred in a backup feature star in Marvel Mystery Comics, the flagship title of Marvel's Golden Age predecessor, Timely Comics. Created by writer-artist Steve Dahlman, Electro appeared in Marvel Mystery #4—19 (February 1940 – May 1941). His origin story described his invention by Professor Philo Zog, one of a group of twelve known as the Secret Operatives.

In The Twelve by J. Michael Straczynski and Chris Weston (published in 2008 and 2012), Electro is part of a cadre of heroes trapped in a secret bunker during the Battle of Berlin, seemingly for examination by Nazi scientists. After the fall of the Third Reich, the eleven heroes are left in suspended animation, with no one knowing of their final fate, and Electro is cut off from the telepathic mindwaves of Philo Zog.

When, sixty years later, the Twelve are recovered and brought back to New York, in a safehouse for rehabilitation to modern times, the still inactive Electro is stored in a garage in the same safehouse, its property contended by Philo Zog's niece Elizabeth Zogolowski and the U.S. government, who are willing to disassemble Electro for the secrets of his telepathic interface. Zogolowski reveals how the telepathic bond between Philo and his creation was so strong that Philo died shortly after the war from an acute withdrawal syndrome.

Zogolowski is able to obtain temporary custody over Electro, but lacks the wealth necessary to reclaim its possession: the Blue Blade steps in, offering her all the needed money in exchange for using Electro in his cabaret-like show.

Electro influences the time-traveling adventures in the Avengers/Invaders crossover. As one of the heroes lost in an alternate-universe World War II, Iron Man uses his armor's holograms to disguise himself as Electro. This fails to work for the Red Skull has already slain Electro, along with most of the 'Mystery Men'.

=== Ivan Kronov ===
Marvel's next Electro was a Communist supervillain created during the unsuccessful attempt by Marvel's 1950s predecessor, Atlas Comics, to revive superheroes in that decade. This Electro, a Soviet citizen named Ivan Kronov, appeared on the cover and in the six-page story "His Touch is Death" in Captain America #78 (September 1954), penciled and inked by John Romita Sr. and almost certainly if not confirmably written by Stan Lee. Many years later, this Electro reappeared in What If? #9 (June 1978), "What If the Avengers had been Formed During the 1950s?" and, in flashback, in Captain America Annual #13 (1994).

== Electron ==
- First appearance: X-Men #107 (October 1977)
- Created by: Chris Claremont and Dave Cockrum
- Species: Shi'ar
- Teams: Imperial Guard
- Abilities: Magnetism manipulation; Projection of bolts of electrical energy

Electron is a Shi'ar who is a member of the Shi'ar Imperial Guard. The character, created by writer Chris Claremont and artist Dave Cockrum, first appeared in Uncanny X-Men #107 (October 1977). Electron can manipulate magnetism and project bolts of electrical energy. Like many original members of the Imperial Guard, Electron is the analog of a character from DC Comics' Legion of Super-Heroes: in his case Cosmic Boy.

Part of the division of the Imperial Guard known as the Superguardians, Electron is amongst the first of the Imperial Guard encountered by the X-Men, who sought to rescue the Princess-Majestrix Lilandra Neramani from her insane brother D'Ken. After the battle, Lilandra takes over as Majestrix, and the Guard swears allegiance to her.

Electron resurfaces in the storyline "Imperial", where he is alleged to be D'Ken's son, Ror'ak Neramani. Convinced that he is going to be removed from the Imperial Guard, Electron stages a coup and takes control of the Shi'ar empire.

== Elementary ==
Elementary is a character appearing in American comic books published by Marvel Comics.

Juliet Marcos aka Elementary has the ability to transform into the four elements: fire, earth, water and air. These transformations is triggered by her emotions and contact with an external source of said element.

== Elendil ==
Elendil is a character appearing in American comic books published by Marvel Comics. The first incarnation appeared in Tales to Astonish #52 (January 1968) and was created by Stan Lee and Dick Ayers.

Professor Nathan Garrett, the criminal Black Knight, developed genetic engineering techniques capable of granting a horse the wings of a bird. He used it to create a mount to ride during his criminal adventures.

After Garrett's final defeat by Iron Man that led to his death, Elendil escaped, was found and further mutated by Victor Frankenstein's great-granddaughter Victoria, giving it claws, bat-like wings, and a pointed tail. Dreadknight takes Hellhorse as his steed.

=== Elendil in other media ===
Elendil appears in Iron Man.

== Corina Ellis ==
Corina Ellis is a scientist and the prison warden of Graymalkin Prison, which used to be the X-Mansion. Following the death of Ellis's assistant Scurvy, Graymalkin prisoner Inmate X escapes and is revealed to be Ellis' brother Oscar. After it was exposed that Ellis and her associates have no legal authority to arrest mutants, Ellis is removed from power. Former inmate Penance takes advantage of the power vacuum and replaces Ellis as warden.

== Mitchell Ellison ==
Mitchell Ellison is a character who originated in the Marvel Cinematic Universe television series Daredevil, portrayed by Geoffrey Cantor. The character, created by Marco Ramirez, first appeared in the episode "Rabbit in a Snowstorm".

Ellison is the editor-in-chief of the New York Bulletin. Known for his dry yet knowledgeable demeanor, Ellison believes in his employees' abilities to research and report a good story. He is long time friends with Ben Urich, whom he considers his most trusted reporter. Their friendship hits a snag with the appearance of the Devil of Hell's Kitchen and the rise in organized crime. As Urich insists on reporting on Wilson Fisk, Ellison wants him to work on meaningless fluff pieces to boost the paper's ailing circulation numbers. Ellison still looks out for Urich, as he later offers Urich a promotion to a higher position that would guarantee Urich could pay for his wife Doris' medical bill, but Urich politely turns him down.

Ellison and Urich have a falling out when Urich tries to print a story about Fisk killing his own father, but Ellison shoots him down citing a lack of proof. Urich begins to accuse him of being on Fisk's payroll, and such accusations get him fired as a result. After Fisk kills Urich, Ellison attends his funeral and receives a cold stare from Karen Page. Ellison's secretary Caldwell turns out to be Fisk's informant and is arrested by the FBI.

=== Mitchell Ellison in comics ===
Mitchell Ellison and the New York Bulletin are mentioned in Kingpin (vol. 2) #4, cementing their existence in the mainstream Marvel Universe. Journalist Sarah Dewey is given a folder by Wilson Fisk containing several notices and letters with Ellison being listed as the new editor-in-chief of the Bulletin after it was dropped from under the control of Gavin Boyce.

== Elsie-Dee ==
Elsie-Dee

Publication information
- Publisher: Marvel Comics
- First appearance: Wolverine vol. 2 #37 (1991)
- Created by: Larry Hama (story), Marc Silvestri (art)

In-story information
- Alter ego: Elsie-Dee
- Species: Android
- Team affiliations: Reavers
- Partnerships: Wolverine
- Abilities: Superhuman computational, analytical, creative reasoning and strength

Elsie-Dee is a character appearing in American comic books published by Marvel Comics. The character is usually depicted as an ally of Wolverine. The character first appeared in Wolverine vol. 2 #37 in an inanimate state suspended in a tank of gelatin. Elsie-Dee is a sentient android. Her name is a pun on LCD, indicating her artificial origins.

Elsie-Dee was created along with her counterpart Albert (a robot double of Wolverine) by Donald Pierce. These androids were designed to kill Wolverine. The Wolverine double was to act as the bait and Elsie-Dee (who outwardly appears to be a 5-year-old girl) was supposed to trap Wolverine in a burning building where she would detonate with sufficient force to kill him.

The plan fails because one of Pierce's henchmen, Bonebreaker, accidentally gives Elsie-Dee the maximum artificial intelligence one of Pierce's automatons was capable of, instead of the intended intellect of a 5-year-old. As a result, Elsie-Dee eventually finds a way to defuse her detonation sequence. She also enhances the primitive intelligence of her counterpart, giving him intelligence beyond even hers. They meet and battle Wolverine in the skies over New York. She and her counterpart decide that he was a noble person and did not deserve to die and consequently abandon their mission.

=== Elsie-Dee in other media ===
Elsie-Dee appears in Wolverine: Adamantium Rage.

== Elysius ==
Elysius was created by ISAAC, the sentient computer system of Titan, after it was corrupted by Thanos. She serves as ISAAC's lieutenant and aided it in conquering Titan.

Elysius later aids Captain Mar-Vell and Drax the Destroyer against ISAAC, Stellarax, Lord Gaea, and Chaos, entering a relationship with Mar-Vell. Elysius returns to Earth with Mar-Vell and Rick Jones. Some time later, Elysius attends the death-watch of Mar-Vell as he is dying from cancer.

== Ember ==
Ember is the name of several characters appearing in American comic books published by Marvel Comics.

=== Pavel Chenklo ===
Pavel Chenklo is a Slorenian historian who become a mystic champion of the Dudak.

=== Jason Pierce ===
Jason Pierce is a pyrokinetic member of the Bastards of Evil who claims to be the son of Pyro. It is later revealed that he was brainwashed into thinking that Pyro was his father and joining the Bastards of Evil by Superior, who claims to be the son of Leader.

=== Horse ===
Ember is a horse owned by Calico. A psychic link between them enables Ember to assume the form of a winged horse with mental energy wings, enabling it to fly. They were chased by Hag and ended up joining up with Gambit's X-Men branch. Ember and Calico joined up with the other mutants who sought the X-Men's aid and formed the Outliers. It is later revealed that Ember previously died in a fire, but survived as a psychic construct.

== Emplate ==
Emplate (Marius St. Croix) is a character appearing in American comic books published by Marvel Comics. He first appeared in Generation X #1, and was created by Scott Lobdell and Chris Bachalo. Emplate would serve as one of the major antagonists to the Generation X comic book series during its run. The character first appeared in Generation X #1 (November 1994).

Emplate was born Marius St. Croix, the brother of Generation X's M (Monet) and the M-Twins (Nicole and Claudette). When his mutant powers first manifested, his sisters are disgusted, especially Monet. In retaliation, Marius turns Monet into Penance, a monstrous form possessing durable skin, powerful claws, and enhanced agility.

Nicole and Claudette manage to banish Marius to another dimension, with Penance following him in an attempt to return herself to normal. While in the other dimension, Marius is subjected to torture by unidentified creatures and uses Penance's bone marrow to sustain himself. Marius periodically returns to Earth to find additional sources of sustenance. He first encounters Generation X after trying to attack Chamber, who has just arrived in the United States.

Emplate is eventually welcomed to the island Krakoa after it is established as a mutant nation. Emplate and Selene are tasked with measuring the amount of psychic energy that Krakoa takes from its inhabitants, with a similar protocol being enacted for their feeding.

Emplate is a mutant with the ability to absorb the bone marrow of others. If he absorbs all of a person's marrow, then they will die. If Emplate only partially absorbs marrow, he can copy the superpowers of the donor and place them under his control. Additionally, Emplate can become invisible and intangible by shifting out of the physical plane.

== Entropy ==
Entropy is a cosmic entity associated with the concept of entropy.

== Eon ==
Eon is a cosmic entity associated with time.

== Epoch ==
Epoch is the "daughter" of Eon and "granddaughter" of Eternity.

== Equinox ==
Equinox (Terrance Sorenson) is a character appearing in American comic books published by Marvel Comics. Created by writer Len Wein and artist Gil Kane, the character first appeared in Marvel Team-Up #23 (July 1974). Equinox is a supervillain who gained thermodynamic powers following a lab accident, allowing him to control and produce both ice and fire. The character has also been a member of Freedom Force, a heroic team assembled as part of the Fifty State Initiative.

=== Equinox in other media ===
Equinox appears in Marvel: Ultimate Alliance 2, voiced by Jimmie Wood.

== Ereshkigal ==
=== Goddess ===
A fictional version of the Mesopotamian god Ereshkigal appeared in Thor Annual #10 (1981). She was a Death god attempting to increase her power, but was thwarted.

== Erg ==
Erg

Publication information
- Publisher: Marvel Comics
- First appearance: Power Pack #12 (July 1985)
- Created by: Louise Simonson; June Brigman

In-story information
- Alter ego: Unknown
- Species: Human mutant
- Team affiliations: Drain Dwellers; Morlocks; The 198
- Notable aliases: Erg
- Abilities: Energy absorption and redirection

Erg is a character appearing in American comic books published by Marvel Comics. Created by writer Louise Simonson and artist June Brigman, the character first appeared in Power Pack #12 (July 1985). Erg is a mutant—a subspecies of humans born with superhuman abilities—who can absorb various forms of energy and project them as blasts. Erg directs energy through his left eye, with his right eye being covered with an eyepatch. Over the course of his publication history, he has been a member of several teams, including the 198 and the Morlocks.

=== Erg in other media ===
- Erg makes non-speaking appearances in X-Men: The Animated Series as a member of the Morlocks.
  - Erg appears in X-Men '97, in which he and the Morlocks relocate to Genosha before being killed by Sentinels.
- Erg appears in The Gifted, portrayed by Michael Luwoye. This version is a mutant separatist and the leader of the Morlocks. He wears an eyepatch over his left eye and bears a self-inflicted M-shaped scar symbolizing mutant pride. Erg and the Morlocks are portrayed as a neutral faction seeking to live in peace.

== Ernst ==
Ernst is a character appearing in American comic books published by Marvel Comics. She was created by Grant Morrison and Frank Quitely who first appeared in New X-Men #135 (April 2003).

Ernst, whose physical appearance suggests that she may be a teenage girl suffering from progeria or dyskeratosis congenita, was a student at the Xavier Institute who possesses superhuman strength and durability. She briefly joined the so-called Brotherhood assembled by the mutant Xorn when he went on a drug-induced, destructive rampage, posing as Magneto. Ernst is one of the few mutants who have retained their powers after the events of "M-Day" and continued living at the Xavier Institute.

Later, Ernst relocated to Utopia, the new base of X-Men. As part of the Jean Grey school's remedial class, she went on weekly crime-fighting patrols with Special Counselor Spider-Man. Ernst again relocated to X-Haven after the spread of Terrigen Mist, which is harmful to mutants. She was later chosen to be trained as an X-Man by Colossus. During their first mission, the team of trainees were sent to the future and had to survive there for a year before being rescued by the X-Men.

== Abraham Erskine ==
- Further reading: Abraham Erskine at the Comic Book DB (archived from the original); Abraham Erskine at the Grand Comics Database

Abraham Erskine is a character appearing in American comic books published by Marvel Comics. The character, created by Joe Simon and Jack Kirby, first appeared in Captain America Comics #1 (March 1941), and was originally named Professor Reinstein. His modern name was not introduced until decades later, with Reinstein being retconned as an alias.

Abraham Erskine is a German biochemist and physicist who had spent much of his early life studying the human species. During this time, he develops a diet and exercise program along with a serum and "vita-rays" which would transform an ordinary person into a "super soldier". This process was used to transform Steve Rogers into Captain America. Moments after the process is completed, Erskine is assassinated by Heinz Kruger.

Erskin is later revealed to be the great-grandfather of Michael Van Patrick.

=== Abraham Erskine in other media ===
- Abraham Erskine makes non-speaking cameo appearances in Spider-Man.
- Abraham Erskine makes a non-speaking cameo appearance in The Avengers: Earth's Mightiest Heroes episode "Meet Captain America".
- Maria Vaselli, a character inspired by Abraham Erskine, appears in Captain America, portrayed by Carla Cassoli.
- Abraham Erskin appears in the projects set in the Marvel Cinematic Universe:
  - Abraham Erskine appears in Captain America: The First Avenger, portrayed by Stanley Tucci.
  - Abraham Erskine appears in the What If...? episode "What If... Captain Carter Were The First Avenger?", voiced by Stanley Tucci.

== Escapade ==
Escapade is a character appearing in American comic books published by Marvel Comics. She was created by Charlie Jane Anders, Ro Stein, and Ted Brandt and first appeared in Marvel's Voices: Pride (vol. 2) #1 (June 2022).

Shela Sexton is a trans girl and mutant with the ability to switch circumstances with others, a form of reality warping. Escapade operates with her friend Morgan Red, a mutant who can transmute organic material into chocolate, and a genetically engineered winged turtle named Hibbert. She initially operated as a thief, stealing from corrupt organizations. She eventually joined the mutant nation of Krakoa after a prophecy made by Destiny of Escapade causing Morgan's death. Escapade worked alongside mutants of Krakoa, fighting the U-Men, Count Nefaria, and Selene, successfully averting Morgan's death. She was recruited for Avengers Academy, where she fought villains such as Sin, Emplate, and Jack O'Lantern. She briefly dates Cerebella while on Krakoa and dates Brielle Brooks (daughter of Blade) while in Avengers Academy.

== Eve ==
Eve is the name of two characters appearing in American comic books published by Marvel Comics.

=== Biblical version ===
The biblical Eve first appeared in Bible Tales for Young Folk #1 (April 1953), and was created by Jerry Robinson.

=== Artificial intelligence ===
An artificial intelligence acted as an enforcer alongside Adam. The character first appeared in New Mutants vol. 1 #98 (December 1990), and was created by Fabian Nicieza and Rob Liefeld. Eve acts on Gideon's behalf involving corporate espionage with Emmanuel Da Costa as well as fighting Night Thrasher and Cable.

== Doris Evans ==
Doris Evans is a character appearing in American comic books published by Marvel Comics. First appearing in Strange Tales (vol. 1) #113 (July 1963), she was created by Stan Lee, Jerry Siegel and Dick Ayers.

She is a love interest for the Human Torch, but she was frequently bothered by Johnny Storm's tardiness caused by superhero duties.

== Christine Everhart ==
Christine Everhart is a character appearing in American comic books published by Marvel Comics.

Christine Everhart works for The Daily Bugle as an investigative reporter. As part of her job, she covers Tony Stark's appearance before the U.S. Senate.

=== Christine Everhart in other media ===
- Christine Everhart appears in media set in the Marvel Cinematic Universe (MCU), portrayed by Leslie Bibb. This version works for Vanity Fair as Sony Pictures owned the film rights to the Daily Bugle at the time. Introduced in Iron Man (2008), she makes subsequent appearances in Iron Man 2 (2010) and the faux news program WHIH Newsfront. Additionally, alternate timeline variants of Everhart appear in What If...?.
- Christine Everhart appears in the Avengers Assemble episode "The Conqueror", voiced by Laura Bailey.

== Evil Deadpool ==
Evil Deadpool is a character appearing in American comic books published by Marvel Comics.

A British psychologist named Ella Whitby was obsessed with Deadpool. She has managed to collect the different body parts of Deadpool that he lost over time and kept them in a refrigerator. Deadpool later found out about Ella's collection of his body parts and threw them out. Unbeknownst to him, the body parts still had a healing factor and fused into a patchwork form with two lower parts of his lost right arms and fragments of Deadpool's previous costumes that Deadpool wore over the years. Deadpool and Evil Deadpool fought each other at different points before Deadpool found a way to neutralize his healing factor and took the body away.

The neutralizing of Evil Deadpool's healing factor did not last long as Evil Deadpool came back to life. He joined Interpol agent Allison Kemp, Slayback, and T-Ray in a revenge plot against Deadpool. During Deadpool's fight with Evil Deadpool, Kemp gave up on her plot and shot Evil Deadpool.

Evil Deadpool later joined up with the Evil Deadpool Corps and battled Deadpool and the Mercs for Money.

== Exterminatrix ==
Exterminatrix is a supervillain appearing in American comic books published by Marvel Comics.

Oubliette Midas is the daughter of Doctor Midas who was taught how to kill anything when operating as Exterminatrix. Even though she had a small scar on her cheek, Exterminatrix was made to wear a mask at all times by her father.

Following Doctor Midas' death, Exterminatrix takes over the Midas Foundation, chops off one of her father's hands, and uses its blood to make special bullets that turn anything struck by them into gold.

During the "A.X.E.: Judgment Day" storyline, Exterminatrix raids the Baxter Building in an attempt to steal Mister Fantastic's brain. Analyzing Exterminatrix's DNA, Invisible Woman deduces that Doctor Midas cannot be Exterminatrix's biological father and that she is adopted.

During the "One World Under Doom" storyline, Exterminatrix appears as a member of Mad Thinker's incarnation of the Masters of Evil and accompanies the group in invading the Impossible City.

== Eye-Boy ==
Eye-Boy (Trevor Hawkins) is a character appearing in American comic books published by Marvel Comics. He was created by Jason Aaron and Nick Bradshaw, first appearing in Wolverine & the X-Men #19 (October 2012).

Eye-Boy is a mutant who possesses 55 additional eyes located across his body that enable him to see through illusions, view electrical and magical waves, and pinpoint weaknesses.

Trevor Hawkins manifested his powers after the Avengers vs. X-Men storyline and joined the Jean Grey School for Higher Learning. Eye-Boy was part of the new Generation X under Jubilee, facing Emplate. During the Krakoan Age, Eye-Boy joins X-Factor Investigations.

=== Eye-Boy in other media ===
Eye-Boy makes non-speaking appearances in X-Men '97.
