= SuperGun =

Device used to play arcade games

A SuperGun (or super gun) is a device used to play arcade games in lieu of requiring a full arcade cabinet. The SuperGun can be used to display the image from an arcade game on an ordinary television.

Arcade games are conventionally played on the arcade cabinets for which they were originally designed, but these cabinets are large-sized and expensive. The supergun provides the universal cabinet interface in a greatly reduced size, allowing arcade games to be tested or enjoyed without needing the entire cabinet. Superguns frequently resemble video game consoles which plug into a television or monitor, and have detached joysticks and play arcade boards as if they were large cartridges. Some superguns are a large box with two arcade controllers side by side, resembling the top of a typical arcade cabinet.

A SuperGun contains the inner workings of a standard arcade videogame cabinet inside a small plastic or metal box. A SuperGun plugs into a JAMMA board and provides native RGB video output, usually through an SCART connector. As the SCART connector is not common on televisions in North America, a supergun may also convert the RGB signal into composite video, S-video, component video or VGA signals, with varying degrees of quality. Sound is by default mono line level as this is the Jamma standard, but many games offer non-standard stereo. Sound output is usually by either 3.5mm, or phono sockets.

While it is usually assumed that a supergun will automatically play JAMMA-compatible arcade boards, many systems support additional features not provided by JAMMA. The most common additional feature is wirings for extra buttons. This can be done with an extra set of wires that directly connect the supergun to the arcade board (called a "kick harness") or by wiring the extra buttons to some unused pins on the JAMMA connector itself. Regardless of the method used, these extra connections fall into the generic name JAMMA+. JAMMA only provides for three buttons per controller, but games requiring wiring for extra buttons have become common enough that many superguns support this out of the box as well.

Many arcade systems that don't have a JAMMA compatible connector can be played via adaptors that plug in between the SuperGun's JAMMA interface and the arcade board itself.

There exist many non-standalone arcade systems in the form of motherboards that will accept games built into cartridges, for interchangeability. For example, to play an SNK Neo-Geo game such as Samurai Shodown, one would need to first plug an MVS board into the supergun (which must support four buttons, standard on MVS games) and then plug the MVS game into the MVS motherboard. Similarly, Capcom has the CPS-2 for its games.

Alternatively, some modders may create one consolized arcade board, by adding the conversion components directly to the arcade board, rather than making a universal supergun for multiple boards. This process is most popular for boards that have interchangeable games, such as Neo Geo MVS and Atomiswave.

The SuperGuns are usually made by devoted fans, and not official companies.
