= List of arcade video games: P =

This is a list of arcade video games organized alphabetically by name. It does not include PC or console games unless they were also released in video arcades. See Lists of video games for related lists.

Title	Alternate Title(s)	Year	Manufacturer	Genre(s)	Max. Players	PCB Model
P's Attack	—	2004	Uniana		2	
P-47: The Phantom Fighter	P-47 Thunderbolt	1988	Jaleco	Scrolling shooter	2	Mega System 1
P-47 Aces	—	1995	Jaleco	Scrolling shooter	2	
P.O.W.: Prisoners of War	Datsugoku: Prisoners of War ^{JP}	1988	SNK	Beat 'em up	2	
Pac & Pal	Pac-Man & Chomp Chomp	1983	Namco	Maze	2	
Pac-Land	—	1984	Namco	Platformer	2	
Pac-Man	Puckman ^{JP}	1980	Namco	Maze	2	
Pac-Man Battle Royale	—	2011	Namco Bandai Games	Maze	2	
Pac-Mania	—	1987	Namco	Maze	2	Namco System 1
Pac-Man Plus	—	1982	Bally Midway	Maze	2	
Paca Paca Passion	—	1999	Produce			
Paca Paca Passion 2	—	1999	Produce			
Paca Paca Passion Special	—	1999	Produce			
Pachi Fever	—	1983	Sanki Denshi Kougyou	Pachinko	1	
Pachinko Sexy Reaction	—	1998	Sammy	Pachinko / Adult	1	
Pachinko Sexy Reaction 2	—	1999	Sammy	Pachinko / Adult	1	
Pack'n Bang Bang	—	1994	Kaneko			
Pacom Invader	—	1979	Pacom Corp.			
Paddle Mania	—	1988	SNK			
Pairs	—	1989	Nichibutsu			
Pairs Love	—	1991	Athena			
Pairs: Featuring The Giffy Girls	—	1994	Strata			
Paitoride II	—	1994	Metro			
Paitoride II: Adauchi Gaiden	—	1994	Metro			
Palamedes	—	1990	Taito	Puzzle	2	
Pandora's Palace	—	1984	Konami	Platformer	2	
Panel & Variety Akamaru Q Joushou Dont-R	—	1996	Nakanihon Wreath			
Pang Pang	—	1994	Dong Gue La Mi			
Pang Pang Car	—	1999	Icarus			
Pang Pom's	—	1992	Metro			
Pang! 3	Buster Buddies ^{US}	1995	Mitchell	Platformer	2	CPS1
Pango Fun	Pango	1995	InfoCube			
Panic Bomber: Bomber Man	—	1995	Eighting		2	NeoGeo
Panic Park	—	1997	Namco	Action	2	
Panic Road	—	1986	Taito			
Panic Street	—	1999	Kaneko			
Panicuru Panekuru	—	2002	Namco			
Panther	—	1980	Irem			
Paparazzi	—	1996	Yun Sung			
Paperboy	—	1984	Atari Games	Driving	2	
Paradise	—	1994	Yun Sung			
Paradise 2 Deluxe	—	199?	Yun Sung			
Paradise Deluxe	—	199?	Yun Sung			
Parallel Turn	—	1984	Jaleco			
ParaParaDancing	—	2001	Konami			
ParaParaParadise	—	2001	Konami			
ParaParaParadise 1stMIXPlus	—	2001	Konami			
ParaParaParadise 2ndMIX	—	2001	Konami			
ParaParaParadise v1.1	—	2001	Konami			
Paris-Dakar	—	1987	EFO SA			
Parodius	Parodius Da! - Shinwa kara Owarai e ^{JP}	1990	Konami	Horizontal shooter	2	
Party Time: Gonta The Diver II	Ganbare! Gonta!! 2 ^{JP}	1995	Mitchell			
Pasha Pasha 2	—	1998	Dongsung Wonder Park			
Pass	—	1992	Oksan			
Passing Shot	—	1988	Sega			
Pebble Beach: The Great Shot	—	1995	T&E Soft			Sega ST-V
Peek-a-Boo!	—	1993	Jaleco			
Peggle	—	1991	Strata			
Penfan Girls Step1: Mild Mind	—	1999	Eolith			
Pengo	—	1982	Sega	Maze	2	
Penguin Brothers	—	2000	Subsino			
Penguin-Kun Wars	—	1984	UPL			
Penky	—	1996	Yun Sung			
Pepper II	—	1982	Exidy	Maze	2	
The Percussor	—	1981	Orca			
Perestroika Girls	—	1993	Promat			
Perfect Billiards	—	1987	Nihon System			
Performan	—	1985	Data East			
Peter Pack Rat	—	1984	Atari Games	Platformer	2	
Peter Pepper's Ice Cream Factory	—	1984	Data East	Action	2	
Pettan Pyuu	BanBam	1984	Sun Electronics	Puzzle	2	
Phantom II	—	1979	Midway			
Phantoms II	Enigma II	1981	Zilec			
Pharaohs Match	—	1988	Arcadia Systems	Puzzle	2	Arcadia
Phelios	—	1988	Namco	Scrolling shooter	2	
Phoenix	—	1980	Amstar Electronics	Fixed shooter	2	
Photo Play 1998	—	1998	Fun World	Multi-game		
Photo Play 1999	—	1999	Fun World	Multi-game		
Photo Play 2000	—	2000	Fun World	Multi-game		
Photo Play 2001	—	2001	Fun World	Multi-game		
Photo Play 2002	—	2001	Fun World	Multi-game		
Photo Play 2004	—	2004	Fun World	Multi-game		
Photo Play Masters 2001	—	2001	Fun World	Multi-game		
Photo Play Spirit Xtreme	—	2004	Fun World	Multi-game		
Photo Y2K	—	1999	IGS			
Photo Y2K 2	—	2001	IGS			
Phozon	—	1983	Namco	Action	2	
Phraze Craze	—	1986	Merit			
Pickin'	—	1983	Valadon Automation		2	
Pig Newton	—	1983	Sega			
Pig Out: Dine Like a Swine	—	1990	Leland		3	
Pigskin 621 A.D.	—	1990	Bally Midway	Sports	2	
Pilot Kids	—	1998	Psikyo			
Pin-Pong	—	1974	Atari	Video pinball	2	
Pinball Action	—	1985	Tecmo	Video pinball	2	
Pinball Champ '95	—	1995	Veltmeijer Automaten			
Pinbo	—	1984	Jaleco			
Ping Pong Masters '93	—	1993	Electronic Devices			
Ping-Pong King	—	1985	Taito			
PinkSweets: Ibara Sorekara	—	2006	Cave			
Pioneer Balloon	—	1982	SNK			
Pipe Dream	—	1990	Video System			
Pipeline	—	1990	Daehyun Electronics			
Pipi & Bibi's	—	1991				
Pirate Pete	—	1982	Taito	Action	2	
Pirate Ship Higemaru	—	1984	Capcom	Action / Maze	2	
Pirate Treasure	—	1982	Tong Electronic			
Pirates	—	1994	NIX			
Pisces	—	19??	Subelectro			
Pistol Daimyo no Bōken	—	1990	Namco	Scrolling shooter	2	Namco System 1
The Pit	—	1982	Zilec Electronics			
Pit & Run: F1 Race	—	1984	Taito			
Pit Boss	—	1983	Merit			
Pit Boss II	—	1988	Merit			
Pit Boss II Megatouch II	—	1994	Merit			
Pit Boss Megastar	—	1994	Merit			
Pit Boss Megatouch	—	1994	Merit			
Pit Boss Superstar	—	1989	Merit			
Pit Boss Superstar III 30	—	1993	Merit			
Pit Boss Supertouch 30	—	1993	Merit			
Pit-Fighter	—	1990	Atari Games	Fighting	3	Atari G1
Pitapat Puzzle	—	1997	F2 System			
Pitfall II: Lost Caverns	—	1984	Sega	Platformer	2	Sega system 1
Pithon	—	198?				
PK Scramble	—	1993	Cosmo Electronics			
Planet Harriers	—	2001	Sega	Rail shooter	2	
Platoon	—	1995	Nova			
Play Girls	—	1992	Hot-B			
Play Girls 2	—	1993	Hot-B			
Play Sonic 4	—	1991	Segasa	Multi-game		
Playcenter Champions Tournament	—	2000	Recreativos Presas			
Playcenter Evolution III	—	2005	Recreativos Presas			
Player's Choice	—	1983	Merit			
Players Choice	—	1974	PMC Electronics			
Pleasure Goal - 5 on 5 Mini Soccer	—	1996	Saurus		2	NeoGeo
Pleiads	Capitol ^{DE}	1981	Tehkan	Fixed shooter	2	
Plotting	Flipull ^{JP}	1989	Taito	Puzzle	2	
Plump Pop	—	1987	Taito			
Plus Alpha	—	1989	Jaleco	Scrolling shooter	2	
Pnickies	—	1994	Capcom			
Pocket Gal	Super Pool III	1987	Data East			
Pocket Gal Deluxe	—	1992	Data East			
Pocket Gals V.I.P	—	1996	Ace International			
Pocket Racer	—	1997	Namco			
Pochi to Nyaa	—	2003	Aiky		2	NeoGeo
Point Blank	Gun Bullet^{JP}	1994	Namco	Shooting gallery	2	
Point Blank 2	Gunbarl^{JP}	1999	Namco	Shooting gallery	2	
Point Blank 3	Gunbalina^{JP}	2000	Namco	Shooting gallery	2	
Poitto!	—	1993	Metro			
Poizone	—	1991	Eterna			
Poka Poka Satan	—	1996	Kato Seisakujo			
Pokémon Battrio	—	2007	Takara Tomy			
Pokémon Ga-Olé	—	2016	Takara Tomy Arts			
Pokémon Tretta	—	2012	Takara Tomy Arts			
Poker Carnival	—	1991	Subsino			
Poker Dice	—	1991	Strata			
Poker Ladies	—	1989	Mitchell			
Polaris	—	1980	Taito	Fixed shooter	2	
Pole Position	—	1982	Namco	Racing	1	
Pole Position II	—	1983	Namco	Racing	1	
Police 911	Police 24/7^{EU} The Keisatsukan^{JP}	2000	Konami	Shooting gallery	2	
Police 911 2	Keisatsukan Shinjuku 24ji 2^{JP}	2001	Konami	Shooting gallery		
Police Trainer	—	1996	P&P Marketing	Lightgun shooter		
Police Trainer 2	—	2003	P&P Marketing	Lightgun shooter		
Pollux	—	1991	Dooyong	Scrolling shooter	2	
Poly-Net Warriors	—	1993	Konami			
Poly Play	—	1985	VEB Polytechnik	Various	1	
Polygonet Commanders	—	1993	Konami			
Pong	Barrel-Pong; Handicap Pong; Pong in a Barrel	1972	Atari	Sports	2	
Pong Doubles	—	1973	Atari	Sports	4	
Ponpoko	—	1982	Sigma			
Pontoon (Sega)	—	1989	Sega			
Pontoon (Tekhan)	—	1989	Tehkan			
Pool Shark	—	1977	Atari	Sports	2	
Poosho Poosho	—	1999	F2 System			
Pooyan	—	1982	Konami	Fixed shooter	2	
Pop Bingo	—	1996	Dooyong			
Pop Flamer	—	1982	Jaleco	Action	2	
Pop'n Bounce	Gapporin ^{JP}	1997	Video System	Puzzle	2	NeoGeo
pop'n music	—	1998	Konami	Music		
pop'n music 2	—	1999	Konami	Music		
pop'n music 3	—	1999	Konami	Music		
pop'n music 4	—	2000	Konami	Music		
pop'n music 5	—	2000	Konami	Music		
pop'n music 6	—	2000	Konami	Music		
pop'n music 7	—	2001	Konami	Music		
pop'n music 8	—	2002	Konami	Music		
pop'n music 9	—	2003	Konami	Music		
pop'n music Animelo	—	1999	Konami	Music		
pop'n music Animelo 2	—	2000	Konami	Music		
pop'n music Mickey Tunes	—	2001	Konami	Music		
pop'n music Unilab	—	2022	Konami	Music		
Pop'n Pop	—	1998	Taito	Puzzle	2	
Pop'n Run the Videogame	—	1987	Seibu Kaihatsu			
pop'n stage EX	—	1999	Konami	Music		
Pop's Pop's	—	1999	Afega			
Popeye	—	1982	Nintendo	Platform	2	
PoPo Bear	—	2000	BMC			
Popper	—	1983	Omori Electric			
Porky	—	1985	Magic Electronics			
Portraits	—	1983	Olympia			
Pot O' Gold	—	199?	US Games			
Poto Poto	—	1994	Sega			
Pound for Pound	—	1990	Irem			
Power Balls	—	1994	Playmark			
Power Drift	—	1988	Sega	Racing		
Power Drive	—	1986	Bally Midway			
Power Flipper Pinball Shooting	—	1994	Excellent System			
Power Instinct	Gouketsuji Ichizoku^{JP}	1993	Atlus	Fighting	2	
Power Instinct 2	Gouketsuji Ichizoku 2^{JP}	1993	Atlus	Fighting	2	
Power Play	—	1985	Cinematronics			
Power Shovel ni Norou!	—	1999	Taito			
Power Sled	—	1996	Sega			
Power Spikes	Super Volley '91 ^{JP}	1991	Video System	Sports	2	
Power Spikes II	Super Volley '94 ^{JP}	1994	Taito	Sports	2	NeoGeo
Power Stone	—	1999	Capcom	Fighting	2	
Power Stone 2	—	2000	Capcom		4	
Power Surge	—	1988	Vision Electronics			
Prebillian	—	1986	Taito			
Prehistoric Isle	—	1989	SNK		2	
Prehistoric Isle 2	—	1999	SNK		2	NeoGeo
Premier Soccer	—	1993	Konami			
Pretty Soldier Sailor Moon	—	1995	Gazelle	Beat 'em up	2	
PrideGP 2003	—	2003	Capcom			
Primal Rage	—	1994	Atari Games	Fighting	2	
Prime Goal EX	—	1996	Namco			
Primeval Hunt	—	2007	Sega			
Private Teacher Kojinkyouju	—	1989	Home Data			
Pro Bowling	—	1983	Data East			DECO
Pro Mahjong Kiwame	—	1994	Athena			
Pro Soccer	—	1983	Data East			
Pro Sports	—	1983	Data East			
Pro Tennis	—	1982	Data East			
Pro Yakyuu Nyuudan Test Tryout	—	1985	Data East			
Pro Yakyuu World Stadium	—	1988	Namco			
Pro Yakyuu World Stadium '89: Kaimakuhan	—	1989	Namco			
Pro Yakyuu World Stadium '90: Gekitouhan	—	1990	Namco			
Professor Pac-Man	—	1983	Bally Midway	Quiz	2	
Professor Trivia	—	1985	Intermatic			
Progear	Progear no Arashi	2001	CAVE	Scrolling shooter	2	
Progress	—	1984	Chuo			
Progressive Music Trivia	—	1985	PGD			
Project Justice: Rival Schools 2	Moero! Justice Gakuen	2000	Capcom	Fighting	2	
Prop Cycle	—	1996	Namco			
Psychic 5	—	1987	Jaleco	Platformer	2	
Psychic Force	—	1995	Taito	Fighting	2	
Psychic Force 2012	—	1998	Taito	Fighting	2	
Psychic Force EX	—	1996	Taito	Fighting	2	
Psycho Soldier	Saiko Sorujā ^{JP}	1986	SNK	Platformer	2	
Psycho-Nics Oscar	—	1987	Data East	Platformer	2	
Psyvariar: Medium Unit	—	2000	Success	Scrolling shooter	2	
Psyvariar: Revision	—	2000	Success	Scrolling shooter	2	
Psyvariar 2: The Will To Fabricate	—	2003	Success	Scrolling shooter	2	
Puck-People	—	199?	Microhard			
Puckman Pockimon Genie 2000	Jingling Jiazu Genie 2000	2000	Sun Mixing Co, Ltd			
Puchi Carat	—	1997	Taito	Puzzle	2	
Pu·Li·Ru·La	—	1991	Taito	Beat 'em up	2	
Pull the Trigger	—	2003	Digital Silkroad	Lightgun shooter		
Pulsar	—	1981	Sega			
Pulstar	—	1995	Yumekobo	Scrolling Shooter	2	NeoGeo
Pump It Up Extra	—	2001	Andamiro			
Pump it Up EXTRA + Plus	—	2002	Andamiro			
Pump It Up The 1st Dance Floor	—	1999	Andamiro			
Pump It Up The 2nd Dance Floor	—	1999	Andamiro			
Pump It Up The Collection	—	2000	Andamiro			
Pump It Up The O.B.G.: The 3rd Dance Floor	—	2000	Andamiro			
Pump It Up The O.B.G.: The Season Evolution Dance Floor	—	2000	Andamiro			
Pump It Up The Perfect Collection	—	2000	Andamiro			
Pump It Up The Premiere 2: The International 2nd Dance Floor	—	2002	Andamiro			
Pump It Up The Premiere 3: The International 3rd Dance Floor	—	2003	Andamiro			
Pump It Up The Premiere: The International Dance Floor	—	2001	Andamiro			
Pump It Up The PREX 2	—	2002	Andamiro			
Pump It Up The PREX 3: The International 4th Dance Floor	—	2003	Andamiro			
Pump It Up The PREX: The International Dance Floor	—	2001	Andamiro			
Pump It Up The Rebirth: The 8th Dance Floor	—	2002	Andamiro			
Punch Mania 2: Hokuto No Ken	—	2000	Konami	Sports	1	
Punch-Out!!	—	1984	Nintendo	Sports	1	
The Punisher	—	1993	Capcom	Beat 'em up	2	CPS1
Punk Shot	—	1990	Konami	Sports	4	
Purikura Daisakusen	—	1996	Sega			
Pursuit	—	1974	Atari	Shooter	1	
PuRuRun	—	1995	Banpresto			
Pushman	—	1990	Comad			
Puyo Puyo	—	1992	Compile	Puzzle	2	
Puyo Puyo 2	—	1994	Compile	Puzzle	2	
Puyo Puyo Da! featuring ELLENA System	—	1999	Sega			NAOMI cart.
Puyo Puyo Fever	—	1999	Sega			NAOMI cart.
Puyo Puyo Sun	—	1996	Compile			Sega ST-V
Puzz Loop	—	1998	Mitchell Corporation	Puzzle	2	
Puzz Loop 2	—	2001	Mitchell Corporation	Puzzle	2	CPS2
Puzzle Bobble	Bust A Move	1994	Taito	Puzzle	2	NeoGeo
Puzzle Bobble 2	Bust A Move Again	1995	Taito	Puzzle	2	NeoGeo
Puzzle Bobble 2X	—	1995	Taito	Puzzle	2	
Puzzle Bobble 3	—	1996	Taito	Puzzle	2	
Puzzle Bobble 4	—	1997	Taito	Puzzle	2	
Puzzle Break	—	1997	SemiCom			
Puzzle de Bowling	—	1999	Nihon System			
Puzzle De Pon	—	1995	Visco	Puzzle	2	NeoGeo
Puzzle de Pon! R!	—	1997	Visco	Puzzle	2	NeoGeo
Puzzle Game Rong Rong	—	1994	Nakanihon			
Puzzle King	—	2002	K1soft			
Puzzle King: Dance & Puzzle	—	1998	Eolith			
Puzzle Star (1991)	—	1991	Sang Ho Soft	Puzzle	2	
Puzzle Star (1999)	—	1999	IGS	Puzzle	2	
Puzzle Uo Poko	—	1998	Jaleco			
Puzzle! Mushihime-Tama	—	2005	AMI	Puzzle		
Puzzlet	—	2000	Yunizu			
Puzzli	—	1995	Banpresto	Puzzle	2	
Puzzli 2	—	1999	IGS	Puzzle	2	
Puzzli 2 Super	—	2001	IGS	Puzzle	2	
PuzzLove	—	1994	Para			
Puzznic	—	1991	Taito	Puzzle	2	
Pythagoras no Nazo	—	1986	Sega			
