= Potpourri (disambiguation) =

Potpourri is a mixture of dried, naturally fragrant plant material.

Potpourri or Pot-Pourri may also refer to:

- Pot-Pourri (group), an Australian opera/musical theatre group
- Potpourri (music), a kind of musical form structured as ABCDEF...
- Potpourri, a 1980 album by Ray Bryant
- Potpourri (The Thad Jones/Mel Lewis Orchestra album), 1974
- Potpourri (P-Model album), 1981
- The Potpourri, an American weekly newspaper in Houston, Texas
- Potpourri, a category on the American game show Jeopardy!

== See also ==
- Popery, an archaic pejorative word for Roman Catholicism
- Akrobatisches Potpourri, an 1895 German silent film
- Pot-au-feu, a French beef stew
- Potpourrii, a 2008 video game
