= Magnetica =

2006 video game

- Developer: Mitchell Corporation
- Publisher: Nintendo
- Director: Satoru Tsujita
- Composer: Toshiyuki Sudo
- Platforms: Nintendo DS, Wii (WiiWare)
- Release: March 2, 2006: Nintendo DS; JP: March 2, 2006; NA: June 5, 2006; EU: January 6, 2007 WiiWare; JP: April 22, 2008; EU: June 6, 2008; AU: June 6, 2008; NA: June 30, 2008
- Genre: Puzzle
- Modes: Single-player, multiplayer

Magnetica (known in Japanese as Shunkan Puzz Loop (瞬感パズループ, Shunkan Pazurūpu) and in Europe as Actionloop) is a puzzle video game developed by Mitchell Corporation and published by Nintendo for the Nintendo DS, released as part of the Touch! Generations series. It is based on Mitchell's 1998 arcade game Puzz Loop.

The game was first revealed at Nintendo Japan's 2006 Conference. The European version came packaged with the Nintendo DS Rumble Pak.

A version for WiiWare, titled Minna de Puzzloop (みんなでパズループ, Minna de Pazurūpu) in Japanese, Magnetica Twist in North America and Actionloop Twist in Europe and Australia, was released in 2008 for Japan on April 22, on June 6 in Europe, and on June 30 in North America.

== Gameplay ==
In the game, marbles roll down a twisted path toward the goal and the player must stop them by launching new marbles into the oncoming ones. The DS touchscreen is used to 'flick' the marbles from their launch point to their destination with the stylus. The marbles disappear if player matches three or more marbles of the same type; marbles of the same color are magnetically attracted to each other over any length of wide open space, and allowing for chains of disappearances to occur.

The game is over if any marble reaches a specific point, usually near the center of each level, but using the magnetic properties of the marbles can allow one to pull marbles away from this point. Bonus items attached to marbles can, for example, temporarily slow down the rate the marbles advance or cause all marbles of a color to disappear.

In addition to the main survival mode of play, the player can take part in a quest mode, where they must clear boards under certain conditions, and a puzzle mode, where a fixed arrangement of marbles around the board must be cleared using only the few marbles made available to the player.

== Regional differences ==
The Japanese and European versions allows to unlock extra tile sets and new puzzles for Polarium Advance if a copy of that game is inserted on the GBA slot. This feature is absent from the American release.

== WiiWare version ==
The WiiWare version of Magnetica supports up to four players simultaneously in either co-operative or competitive multiplayer modes, in addition to the ability to use the player's own Miis in the game. Control is done by twisting the Wii Remote left or right to turn the marble cannon, and an ability to lob marbles over others has been added.

The game features the challenge and quest modes of the DS version, but omits the puzzle mode. Extensive statistics are also kept for each player.

== Reception ==
Reception

Aggregate score
Aggregator	Score	
Aggregator	DS	Wii
Metacritic	68/100	70/100

Review scores
Publication	Score	
Publication	DS	Wii
Edge	6/10	N/A
Eurogamer	6/10	9/10
Famitsu	31/40	N/A
Game Informer	7.25/10	N/A
GamePro	4/5	N/A
GameRevolution	C−	N/A
GameSpot	7/10	N/A
GameSpy	3/5	N/A
GameZone	8.3/10	N/A
IGN	8/10	7/10
Nintendo Power	8/10	N/A
The Washington Post	2/4	N/A

Magnetica and Magnetica Twist received "average" reviews according to the review aggregation website Metacritic. Nintendo Life said that although the DS version fails to impress with its visuals and audio, it is an excellent addition to anyone's Nintendo DS library whether a gamer is casual or hardcore. The Washington Post criticized the same console version's $35 price tag, which it said was a bit too much for a game that has nothing new to add. In Japan, Famitsu gave the same DS version a score of three eights and one seven for a total of 31 out of 40.
