= Juanito Arcade Mayhem =

2017 action video game

- Developer(s): Game Ever Studio
- Publisher(s): Game Ever Studio
- Designer(s): Joaquin Ibarlucia; Pablo Forconi
- Programmer(s): Joaquin Ibarlucia
- Artist(s): Gabriel Rodriguez; Lucas Bustos; Leonardo Cirius; Facundo Friquet; Diego Forconi
- Platform(s): Microsoft Windows; Android; iOS
- Release: WW: 3 August 2017
- Genre(s): Action
- Mode(s): Single-player multiplayer

Juanito Arcade Mayhem is an action video game developed by Argentina-based independent animation studio and video game developer Game Ever Studio. It was released on August 3 of 2017.

== Plot ==
Juanito Arcade Mayhem tells the story of an alien invasion that strikes in the middle of the night and infects a cabinet filled with classic arcade games. When the mutant Clonocells from outer space attack, a young and lazy boy by the name of Juanito becomes our last hope. Chosen by Gluk, a bipolar manipulative alien, Juanito must enter an arcade cabinet and stop the infection, armed with nothing but his comfy pyjamas and his fearsome arsenal.

== Gameplay ==
Juanito Arcade Mayhem is often compared to Super Pang, as the player fires at several balloon-shaped objects that splinter off into smaller balls. Through over 80 levels, each unique world adds a different mechanic influenced by the same arcade game that served as its inspiration, including classics such as Pac-Man, Wonder Boy and Arkanoid, among several others.

Its charming cartoon style is reminiscent of vintage Disney short films and modern Cartoon Network animations, offering a suitable setting for and old-school challenge.

== Development ==
Development on Juanito Arcade Mayhem started in 2012, when the idea was still for it to be a feature-length animated film. The project soon moved its focus towards a videogame, where the main character would protect his hometown from the alien invasion. Some concept art shows a prototype Juanito traversing different stores in his neighbourhood, defending random citizens that were afflicted. The team decided to create a game that served as an homage to 80's arcade games and genre films, due to the influence they had in the developer's lives.

At first headed for mobile platforms, they eventually built an actual arcade cabinet to showcase the game at festivals and expos. In the interest of the public, a PC counterpart started being developed alongside the mobile version, and it wasn't until December 2016 that it became the main focus of the team.

On 18 May 2017, it was announced that the game will be released in August 2017.

On 13 June 2017, ADVA announced Juanito Arcade Mayhem as one of the projects to be covered under the second edition of their mentorship program "Mi primer videojuego publicado".
