= Number Battle =

2007 video game

- Developer: Mitchell Corporation
- Publisher: Nintendo
- Platforms: Nintendo DS, Nintendo DSi
- Release: Nintendo DS: JP: June 7, 2007; DSiWare: JP: January 28, 2009; PAL: August 14, 2009; NA: January 25, 2010; CHN: June 30, 2011
- Genre: Puzzle
- Mode: Single-player

Number Battle, released in Japan as Sujin Taisen: Number Battles (Note: Japanese: 数陣タイセン, Hepburn: Sūjin Taisen) is a puzzle video game developed by Mitchell Corporation for the Nintendo DS handheld video game console. By the end of 2007, Sujin Taisen sold 21,996 copies.

The game was later released at the Nintendo DSi's DSiWare digital distribution service on January 28, 2009 under the title Chotto Sujin Taisen (ちょっと数陣タイセン, Chotto Sūjin Taisen).

== Gameplay ==
Sujin Taisen plays similarly to a game of dominoes, and is controlled with the Nintendo DS' touchscreen. In each round, the player places a tile on the game board which ranges from 1.5, also featuring paths on them. The object of the game is to place the tiles on the board so that the paths join and the numbers create sequences, which are called "hands". A path on a tile can either be one-way, meaning it emerges from the center number at one side of the piece; two-way, meaning it runs through the tile, either straight through or turning in the middle; three-way, in the shape of a "T"; or four-way, in the shape of a cross. There are four kinds of hands the player can make, two for number sequences and two for path sequences. The number sequences include Sequence Join, which is done by joining the paths of adjacent pieces so that the numbers run in order, and Same Number Join, which is done by joining the path of adjacent numbers with the same number. The path sequences include Enclosure Join, which is done by joining the path of adjacent pieces to create a loop, and Complete Join, which is done by joining paths so that both ends are ended with a one-way path. Sujin Taisen featured online play through the Nintendo Wi-Fi Connection between two and four players, as well as a Vs. Computer mode.

Advanced play strategy revolves around laying the tiles in clever ways so as to score multiple hands with a tile, as well as blocking the opponent from doing the same with items and one's own tiles.

== Development ==
Sujin Taisen was released on June 7, 2007 for the Nintendo DS. It was developed by Mitchell and published by Nintendo. A DSiWare version of it was re-released as Sujin Taisen Number Battles for the Nintendo DSi's DSiWare on January 28, 2009. It retains the Story, Puzzle and Online Multi-player (Nintendo Wi-Fi Connection) modes found in the Nintendo DS release, but loses the Local Multi-Player and DS Download Play modes. The DSiWare version was later released in Europe and North America.

== Reception ==
Sujin Taisen was the 471st best-selling video game of 2007, selling 21,996 copies. Four reviewers for Famitsu gave Sujin Taisen straight 7s, for a total score of 28/40.

In their second set of impressions for the DSiWare games, IGN commented that while the gameplay was difficult at first, after they learned the ins and outs of it by trial and error, they found it fun and addictive. They also praised it for its visuals and sound. IGN called the DSiWare version another great "mini" version of a Nintendo DS game, commenting that they came into this title totally fresh, not knowing the game at all, how to navigate the menus, how to play the game at all, or a lick of Japanese. Despite this, they said that they would recommend even non-Japanese players to download this game. IGN also commented that players should buy the game if they can get over suffering through some menus and an all-Japanese tutorial, adding that it is a great download for its price.

== Legacy ==
The old master character, Hsien, would be featured as one of the spirits in Super Smash Bros. Ultimate.
