= Nintendo DS sales =

Sales of the Nintendo DS family over time

The Nintendo DS is a handheld video game console produced by Nintendo, as the successor to Game Boy Advance. From its release in November 2004 in the Americas, the DS has sold 154.02 million units, including the DS Lite and the Nintendo DSi. It was Nintendo's best-selling console until the Nintendo Switch surpassed it in 2025, but it remains the best-selling handheld console of all time.

== Sales ==
Life-to-date number of units shipped (DS, DS Lite, DSi and DSi XL combined), millions
Date	Japan	Americas	Other	Worldwide
2004-12-31	1.45	1.36	0.03	2.84
2005-03-31	2.12	2.19	0.95	5.27
2005-06-30	-	-	-	6.65
2005-09-30	3.63	2.87	2.34	8.83
2005-12-31	5.70	4.63	4.10	14.43
2006-03-31	6.91	5.11	4.71	16.73
2006-06-30	9.24	5.90	6.13	21.27
2006-09-30	11.52	7.51	7.79	26.82
2006-12-31	14.43	10.18	11.00	35.61
2007-03-31	16.02	11.74	12.52	40.29
2007-06-30	18.11	14.14	15.03	47.27
2007-09-30	19.71	16.06	17.88	53.64
2007-12-31	21.66	20.18	22.94	64.79
2008-03-31	22.38	22.39	25.82	70.60
2008-06-30	22.97	25.11	29.47	77.54
2008-09-30	23.71	27.63	32.99	84.33
2008-12-31	25.67	31.93	38.62	96.22
2009-03-31	26.39	34.46	40.93	101.78
2009-06-30	27.00	36.97	43.78	107.75
2009-09-30	28.12	39.35	46.01	113.48
2009-12-31	29.92	44.99	50.23	125.13
2010-03-31	30.40	46.74	51.74	128.89
2010-06-30	30.86	48.00	53.18	132.04
2010-09-30	31.55	49.28	54.75	135.58
2010-12-31	32.60	54.28	57.71	144.59
2011-03-31	32.76	55.13	58.53	146.42
2011-06-30	32.87	55.69	59.3	147.86
2011-09-30	32.92	56.19	59.90	149.00
2011-12-31	32.96	57.48	60.61	151.06
2012-03-31	32.98	57.76	60.78	151.52
2012-06-30	32.99	58.15	60.91	152.05
2012-09-30	32.99	58.54	60.97	152.50
2012-12-31	32.99	59.68	61.00	153.67
2013-03-31	32.99	59.87	61.01	153.87
2013-06-30	32.99	59.91	61.03	153.93
2013-09-30	32.99	59.93	61.04	153.96
2013-12-31	32.99	59.93	61.05	153.98
2014-03-31	32.99	59.93	61.07	153.99
2014-06-30	32.99	59.93	61.07	153.99
2014-09-30	32.99	59.93	61.09	154.01
2016-03-31	32.99	59.93	61.10	154.02

Life-to-date number of units of Nintendo DS Lite shipped
Date	Japan	Americas	Other	Total
2006-03-31	0.58 million	-	-	0.58 million
2006-06-30	2.72 million	0.68 million	0.76 million	4.15 million
2006-09-30	4.97 million	2.23 million	1.86 million	9.06 million
2006-12-31	7.89 million	4.84 million	4.60 million	17.33 million
2007-03-31	9.48 million	6.41 million	5.96 million	21.85 million
2007-06-30	11.56 million	8.81 million	8.32 million	28.69 million
2007-09-30	13.16 million	10.73 million	11.04 million	34.93 million
2007-12-31	15.12 million	14.85 million	16.00 million	45.97 million
2008-03-31	15.84 million	17.06 million	18.88 million	51.78 million
2008-06-30	16.42 million	19.78 million	22.53 million	58.72 million
2008-09-30	17.16 million	22.30 million	26.05 million	65.51 million
2008-12-31	17.46 million	26.60 million	31.67 million	75.74 million
2009-03-31	17.63 million	28.80 million	33.51 million	79.94 million
2009-06-30	17.71 million	29.76 million	34.79 million	82.26 million
2009-09-30	17.84 million	30.75 million	35.90 million	84.49 million
2009-12-31	18.01 million	33.51 million	37.67 million	89.19 million
2010-06-30	18.10 million	34.33 million	38.35 million	90.78 million
2010-09-30	18.16 million	34.65 million	38.60 million	91.41 million
2010-12-31	18.20 million	35.74 million	38.89 million	92.83 million
2011-03-31	18.20 million	35.89 million	38.97 million	93.06 million
2011-06-30	18.20 million	36.15 million	39.07 million	93.42 million
2011-09-30	18.20 million	36.21 million	39.12 million	93.53 million
2011-12-31	18.20 million	36.37 million	39.16 million	93.74 million
2012-12-31	18.20 million	36.44 million	39.21 million	93.85 million
2014-03-31	18.21 million	36.44 million	39.21 million	93.86 million

== History ==
- On October 3, 2006 Nintendo announced a 20.5% raise in net profit forecast partially attributed to strong DS sales. The company also raised its estimated DS sales forecast by 18%. According to Nintendo, 44% of DS owners were female.
- On July 25, 2007 Nintendo announced in its first quarter financial report that it had increased DS hardware shipments from 22 million to 26 million. Nintendo also raised its DS software sales projection from 130 million units to 140 million. On October 26, 2007, Nintendo announced an increase in DS hardware shipments to 28 million and software to 165 million.
- As of September 26, 2007, the Nintendo DS had sold over 50 million units and is therefore the fastest-selling handheld game console of all time. On October 30, 2007, Chart-Track reported DS sales of over 4 million in the United Kingdom. In November 2007, Media Create reported DS sales of 20 million in Japan.
- During the week of November 18 to November 24, Nintendo of America set a new Nintendo sales record by selling over 653,000 DS units in one week, breaking the previous record held by the Game Boy Advance, which sold 600,000 units.
- On November 27, 2007, Nintendo announced that the DS had set a new weekly hardware sales record in the UK, with over 191,000 units sold, according to Chart-Track; breaking the previous record held by the PSP, which sold 185,000 units in its first week of availability in the UK.
- As of December 27, 2007, the DS had sold over 1 million units in South Korea, according to Nintendo of Korea.
- In 2007, the DS was the best-selling game console in the US and Japan with 8.5 million and 7,143,702 units sold respectively, according to the NPD Group and Enterbrain. In Europe, the DS sold 6.4 million units in 2006 and 8.7 million in 2007, according to estimates by Electronic Arts. In 2008, the DS was the best-selling game console in Japan with 4,029,804 units sold, according to Enterbrain.
- On January 24, 2008, Nintendo Europe revealed that the DS had sold over 20 million units in Europe. Months later in June 2008, the Nintendo DS had sold over 20 million units in the United States, according to NPD Group.
- In Japan, the original style DS had sold 6,449,206 units as of October 1, 2008, according to Famitsu/Enterbrain. As of December 22, 2008, the DS Lite and DSi had sold 17,348,252 and 1,062,416 units in Japan, respectively, according to Enterbrain. As of December 28, 2008, the DS, DS Lite, and DSi combined to sell 25,135,276 units in Japan, according to Enterbrain.
- In the United Kingdom, the Nintendo DS had sold 8.8 million units as of January 3, 2009, according to GfK Chart-Track.
- According to the NPD Group, 3 million Nintendo DS Lites have been sold in the United States for the month of December 2008, breaking the record for the most video game hardware sold in a single month. This record was previously held by the PlayStation 2, which sold 2.7 million units in December 2002.
- On January 30, 2008, Nintendo Australia announced that the DS had sold over 1 million units in Australia. Over a year later on 28 May 2009, Nintendo Australia announced that DS sales in Australia had reached 2 million in a record of 221 weeks, and was the best selling gaming console for the three past years.
- On March 6, 2009, Nintendo announced that it had shipped its 100-millionth Nintendo DS system.
- As of the end of December 2009, shipments of the Nintendo DS series reached 125.13 million units, surpassing the Game Boy and thus becoming the best-selling handheld system ever.
- As of March 31, 2010, the DS further cemented its place as the top-selling handheld platform of all time by selling 27.11 million units worldwide during the fiscal year, totaling 128.9 million units life-to-date. Of that, some 17.82 million were DSis and 2.08 million were DSi XLs.
