= Pang: Magical Michael =

2010 video game

- Developer: Mitchell Corporation
- Publisher: Rising Star Games
- Platform: Nintendo DS
- Release: EU: September 17, 2010; AU: September 24, 2010
- Genre: Puzzle-platform
- Modes: Single-player, multiplayer

Pang: Magical Michael is a puzzle-platform game, released on September 17, 2010, for Nintendo DS that was created by Mitchell Corporation and published in Europe and Australia by Rising Star Games. A release in the United States was planned, but later cancelled. It offers features such as Tour Mode and Panic Mode, as well as dual-screen support, local wireless multiplayer battles, online leaderboards, achievements and a special touchscreen mode that can be unlocked later in the game. It shares some DNA with the previous game in the series: the arcade game Mighty! Pang.

== Reception ==
Reception

Aggregate scores
Aggregator	Score
GameRankings	76.8%
Metacritic	74%

Review scores
Publication	Score
Cubed3	9/10
Nintendo Life	8/10

Pang: Magical Michael received positive scores from media sources. On review aggregator website GameRankings, it received a score of 76.8%, while on Metacritic, Pang: Magical Michael has a rating of 74%. Nintendo Life gave it 8/10 stating that the game "is an excellent continuation of the Pang series, one designed for both entry-level and experienced players alike. It can either be treated as a simple challenge, a quest to beat and defeat all of the stages presented, or an invitation to explore and get as much out of it as possible."
