= Polarium =

2004 video game

- North American box art
- Developer: Mitchell Corporation
- Publisher: Nintendo
- Director: Takamitsu Hagiwara
- Designer: Takamitsu Hagiwara
- Platform: Nintendo DS
- Release: JP: December 2, 2004; EU: March 11, 2005; AU: March 24, 2005; NA: April 18, 2005; CHN: July 23, 2005
- Genre: Puzzle
- Modes: Single-player, multiplayer

Polarium (Note: Japanese: 直感ヒトフデ, Hepburn: Chokkan Hitofude; lit. "Single Stroke Intuition") is a 2004 puzzle video game developed by Mitchell Corporation and published by Nintendo for the Nintendo DS. It was a launch title in Japan, Europe and China. In the game, players use a stylus to draw lines on the DS's touch screen, flipping black and white tiles to clear puzzles. A Game Boy Advance version, Polarium Advance, was released with additional puzzles.

== Gameplay ==
The player selects tiles by drawing lines over them with the stylus. Selected tiles will flip from black to white or vice versa. In the standard Tetris-like challenge mode, players must make room for falling tiles by clearing rows as they pile up on the bottom screen. Rows are cleared by flipping the tiles to make rows that are all black or all white. Surrounding the main puzzle area are gray "neutral" tiles that have no effect on the puzzle but can be used to flip disconnected groups of tiles in a single pass. The scoring in Challenge and Versus mode are based on how the lines are cleared; for example, more points are given when more lines are cleared (lines), when numerous lines are cleared with just one stroke continuously (chains), when there are 2 separate lines cleared with uncleared lines between them (split), or when several lines are cleared in one stroke, but different lines have different polarities (borders).

=== Game modes ===
- Challenge Blocks of tiles continually fall from above. Players must rapidly clear tiles by drawing lines to create horizontal rows of the same color. The game is over when the blocks of tiles reach the top of the top-screen. There are 10 levels, players advance one level for every 100 lines cleared. Each level begins with the level number drawn with the tiles, and ends with a row of pink tiles. When these pink tiles reach the bottom of the screen, the entire screen is cleared and a 10,000 point bonus is awarded. The lines that fall from the top in each level have characteristics distinct to that level. For instance, the first half of the first level consists of 3 line groups that can be cleared with one stroke.
  - Practice Practice is similar to challenge mode, in that blocks continuously fill from the top. However, gameplay is limited to one level. Any level reached by the player in normal challenge mode can be played. There is no time limit, or penalty for not clearing the lines.
  - High Scores Win or lose, if a player scores enough points, they are given a chance to draw a picture for their entry in the high score list. The player can view the icons, score, number of lines cleared for the top three scores from the challenge mode screen. Scores are also given grades, i.e. 1,758,865 points with 847 lines cleared is a A-.
- Puzzle: Players must figure out how to clear complex puzzles in one continuous stroke. Players are challenged to clear 100 included puzzles or create their own custom puzzles. Numerical passwords to these puzzles can be generated and swapped with friends. Once all the puzzles are cleared a smiley face appears on both screens, flipping from black to white with text announcing that all 100 puzzles, and the credits are unlocked.
- Versus: Compete against friends to clear puzzles. As lines are cleared, they'll appear on the foe's screen. Flip the opponent's tiles, earn power-ups, block their border tiles, and more.
- Lounge: The place to access tutorials, manage game preferences, and wirelessly sync with other players to exchange custom puzzles. Players can also view the credits once they have been unlocked.

== Demo version ==
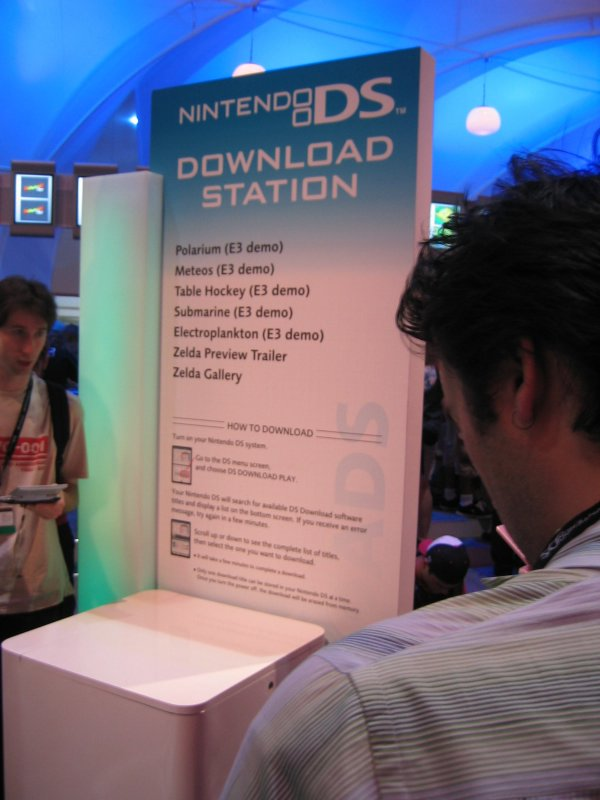
A demo of Polarium was available for download from Nintendo DS Download Stations at E3 2005.

Nintendo DS Download Play allows Nintendo DS owners who do not have a copy of Polarium to wirelessly download this demo version of the game to their system from a friend or kiosk.

- Tutorial: This is a quick introduction to Polarium. It is the same as in the full version.
- Puzzles: This mode includes ten sample puzzles. The first five of these puzzles, which spell out "PO (Note: Japanese: ヒ) LA (Note: Japanese: ト) RI (Note: Japanese: フ) UM (Note: Japanese: デ) DS" on the screen, are unique to the demo version.
- Versus: This mode is identical to the versus mode in the full game except that players must play against someone who owns a copy of Polarium (this feature doesn't exist in the Japanese version).

== Polarium Advance ==
A Game Boy Advance version of Polarium, called Polarium Advance, was released in Japan, Europe and America. Interestingly, its development started before the DS version. The game features almost four times as many puzzles as Polarium, as well as the removal of Challenge mode, and the addition of new tiles, among other gameplay tweaks.

The game was released in North America sometime during November 2006, published by Atlus rather than Nintendo.

== Critical reception ==
Reception

Aggregate score
| Aggregator | Score |
|---|---|
| Metacritic | 73/100 |

Review scores
| Publication | Score |
|---|---|
| 1Up.com | B |
| Edge | 7/10 |
| EP Daily | 8/10 |
| Eurogamer | 7/10 |
| Famitsu | 31/40 |
| Game Informer | 8.25/10 |
| GameSpot | 6.9/10 |
| GameSpy | 4/5 |
| GameZone | 7.9/10 |
| IGN | 7.8/10 |
| Nintendo Power | 3.8/5 |
| Nintendo World Report | (JP) 8/10 (US) 7.5/10 |
| Pocket Gamer | 1.5/5 |
| X-Play | 3/5 |
| Detroit Free Press | 3/4 |
| The Sydney Morning Herald | 3.5/5 |

Polarium received "average" reviews according to the review aggregation website Metacritic. In Japan, Famitsu gave it a score of one eight, one seven, and two eights for a total of 31 out of 40.
