= Buster Bros. Collection =

1997 video game

- US box art
- Developer: Mitchell Corporation
- Publisher: Capcom
- Platform: PlayStation
- Release: JP: March 14, 1997; NA: April 21, 1997; UK: June 1998
- Genre: Action
- Modes: Single-player, multiplayer

Buster Bros. Collection is a video game developed by Mitchell Corporation and published by Capcom for the PlayStation.

== Gameplay ==
Buster Bros. Collection is a compilation of Buster Bros. (1989), Super Buster Bros. (1990), and Buster Buddies (1995).

The graphics and sound are the same as the arcade versions, but the music is emulated by Portable Sound Format (PSF) files, which are very similar to MIDI.

== Reception ==
Official UK PlayStation Magazine reviewed the PlayStation version of the game, noting "It's old and it looks it, though the games which comprise this collection are highly playable and addictive. Worth a look, but it won't hold your attention for ever."

Next Generation reviewed the PlayStation version of the game, rating it three stars out of five, and stated that "fans of Bust-A-Move and other simple puzzle games may get a kick out of this one."

Reviewing the PlayStation Buster Bros. Collection, Doctor Devon of GamePro remarked that the game makes no real use of the PlayStation hardware in terms of either graphics or controls, and is less fun to play than the arcade version due to the load times every time the player character is hit. He nonetheless judged that the "classic" gameplay makes the game worthwhile for either newcomers to the series or Buster Bros. fans moved by nostalgia.

German publication MAN!AC awarded it 75% in a June 1997 review, stating (translated) that the "Pang games show that a simple but well thought-out game concept is more fun in the long run than a thrown-together "mega-game"."
