= Tokyo Crash Mobs =

2013 video game

- Developers: Mitchell Corp. Nintendo SPD
- Publisher: Nintendo
- Composer: Megumi Komagata
- Platform: Nintendo 3DS
- Release: JP: August 8, 2012; WW: January 17, 2013
- Genre: Puzzle game
- Mode: Single-player

Tokyo Crash Mobs, known in Japan as Gyōretsu Nageloop (行列ナゲループ, Gyōretsu Nagerupu), is a puzzle game released on the Nintendo eShop for the Nintendo 3DS on August 8, 2012, in Japan and January 17, 2013, worldwide. The game uses full motion video (FMV) to portray its characters, with the cutscenes using the actors in strange situations.

== Gameplay ==
Grace gameplay. Throwing people ahead in the line.

Savannah gameplay. The people are moving towards the red button.

The game is divided into days and weeks, and every day the player changes characters from either Grace or Savannah, each with their own different story.

In stages featuring Grace, she is waiting in line to enter a store. She tries to shorten the line by picking up bystanders and throwing them at other bystanders. The bystanders are divided into different colors; if the player gets three of the same color touching, they will fly off the screen, shortening the line. Grace can clear the stage by clearing the line before the store opens.

In stages featuring Savannah, she has a group of people forming around her. However, they are trying to get to a Red Button, and if they are successful in pushing it, it will send Savannah falling to her death and into a black hole. Savannah rolls people instead of throwing them, meaning that people will come from below instead of above. If you were to hold your aim too long, the people would have time to react by jumping over the incoming pedestrian. Your goal is to make sure Savannah doesn't meet her intergalactic fate by getting rid of all of the people.

Every Sunday, Grace and Savannah team up to survive being ambushed by an army of ninjas wearing all black. Instead of using the Touch Screen, you will now be moving your Nintendo 3DS in all directions in order to aim, using the A button to throw, and B button to roll. The player needs to take out all of the ninjas before you are defeated in battle from losing all of your hearts.

=== Game modes ===
Tokyo Crash Mobs offers the following game modes

Story Mode
Play the game following its bizarre storyline. Unlock cutscenes in this mode.
Challenge Mode
Choose to play as either Grace or Savannah. Try to knock out 999 bystanders before there are too many (Grace), or before they hit the button (Savannah).
Movie Maze
Explore this maze to watch the game's cutscenes. Movie Maze adds (very unfitting) music to the cutscenes. There are secret cutscenes that can be found by tapping around on the touch screen.

== Reception ==
Reception

Aggregate score
Aggregator	Score
Metacritic	68/100

Review scores
Publication	Score
Destructoid	8.5/10
Edge	6/10
Eurogamer	6/10
GameRevolution	8/10
GameZone	6.5/10
IGN	7.7/10
Nintendo Life	7/10
Nintendo World Report	7.5/10
Official Nintendo Magazine	65%
Pocket Gamer	3.5/5
VentureBeat	81/100
Digital Spy	2/5
Metro	6/10

The game received "average" reviews according to the review aggregation website Metacritic.
