= Mitchell Corporation =

Defunct Japanese video game developer

Mitchell Co., Ltd.
- Native name: 株式会社ミッチェル
- Romanized name: Mitchell Co., Ltd.
- Industry: Video games
- Founded: February 1, 1960; 66 years ago
- Defunct: November 20, 2012; 13 years ago
- Fate: All research and development ceased
- Headquarters: Suginami, Tokyo, Japan
- Area served: Worldwide
- Key people: Roy Ozaki (CEO); Koichi Niida (Director); Nishimura Shin (Director)
- Products: Arcade games, video games, software development
- Website: http://www.mitchell.jp

Mitchell Corporation (株式会社ミッチェル) was a Japanese video game developer based in the Suginami ward of Tokyo. Roy Ozaki served as president, and Koichi Niida served as vice-president. Some employees were former Capcom and TAD Corporation employees.

Mitchell Corporation developed titles for home consoles, handhelds, Japanese mobile phones, the arcade and interactive kiosks located in restaurants and other places. Mitchell also distributed printed circuit boards for the arcade/coin-op market. The company also developed video games for other publishers. Starting in 2004, they started developing games only for Nintendo hardware.

== History ==
The company was originally established on February 1, 1960, as an import/export business by the father of Roy Ozaki. Ozaki and Niida took over the company and began acting as exclusive overseas agents for such video game companies as Visco, Video System, Seta, Metro, Home Data, and other small video game manufacturers in the 1980s.

Mitchell Corporation is best known as the game developer of Puzz Loop. Copyright and trademark registration of Puzz Loop was established in December 1999, the same year it was released to the international coin-op arcade market. Prior to this, it developed the Buster Bros. series of games. Puzz Loop was first released in North America, as well as Europe, under the title Ballistic for the original PlayStation console and Game Boy Color handheld. Infogrames published the PlayStation and Game Boy Color versions in North America in late 1999, while THQ published these same versions for European territories. Capcom published both versions for the Japanese market under the original Puzz Loop title in 2000.

Nintendo of America released Puzz Loop for the Nintendo DS under the title Magnetica on June 5, 2006. A four-player version, titled Magnetica Twist was released two years later on the WiiWare service. Tokyo Crash Mobs is the latest instalment of the Puzz Loop series.

Company activity was suspended on 20 November 2012.

=== Post suspension ===
In 2014 a book, The Untold History of Japanese Game Developers: Volume 1, was published containing an interview with Mitchell Corp CEO Roy Ozaki who mentioned that many of their IPs were available for licensing.

In 2016 a new game using the Pang license was released, only outside Japan, by DotEmu on modern platforms, citing a 2016 copyright date for Mitchell Corporation.

In 2023 an emulated version of the arcade game Cannon Dancer (Osman) was released by ININ Games for modern platforms, citing a 2022 copyright date for Mitchell Corporation.

== Games ==
Game	Release date	Genre(s)	Platform
Gyoretsu Nageloop (Tokyo Crash Mobs)	2012-08-08	Puzzle (Toss)	Nintendo 3DS eShop
Wii Remote Plus Variety (Wii Play: Motion) [Treasure Twirl and Unicycle mini-games]	2011-07-07	Action	Nintendo Wii
Pang: Magical Michael	2010-09-17	Platform, Puzzle, Shooter (Gallery)	Nintendo DS
Chotto Sūjin Taisen (Number Battle, Sujin Taisen: Number Battles)	2009-01-28	Tabletop, Puzzle, Strategy	Nintendo DSiWare
Kakonde Keshite Wakugumi no Jikan (Wakugumi: Monochrome Puzzle)	2009-04-01	Puzzle (Match)	Nintendo DSiWare
Minna de Puzzloop (Actionloop Twist, Magnetica Twist)	2008-04-22	Puzzle (Toss)	Nintendo WiiWare
Sūjin Taisen (Number Battle, Sujin Taisen: Number Battles)	2007-06-07	Tabletop, Puzzle, Strategy	Nintendo DS
Shunkan Puzzloop (Actionloop, Magnetica)	2006-03-02	Puzzle (Toss)	Nintendo DS
Tsuukin Hitofude (Polarium Advance)	2005-10-13	Puzzle	Game Boy Advance
Chokkan Hitofude (Polarium)	2004-12-02	Puzzle	Nintendo DS
Kono e-Tako (This Good Octopus)	2003-11-19	Puzzle (Match)	Arcade
Gamshara (Daredevil)	2002-08	Shooter (Gallery)	Arcade
Janpai Puzzle Choukou (Yangtze River Mahjong Tile Puzzle)	2001-11	Tabletop, Puzzle (Match), Mature	Arcade
Puzz Loop 2	2001-02	Puzzle (Toss)	Arcade
Mighty! Pang	2000-11	Platform, Puzzle, Shooter (Gallery)	Arcade
Ballistic	2000-10-12	Puzzle (Toss)	Game Boy Color
Ballistic	2000-03-16	Puzzle (Toss)	PlayStation
Ballistic	2000 (unreleased)	Puzzle (Toss)	NeoGeo Pocket Color
Ballistic	2000	Puzzle (Toss)	Nuon
Puzz Loop	1998-12	Puzzle (Toss)	Arcade
Buster Bros. Collection	1997-03-14	Platform, Puzzle, Shooter (Gallery)	PlayStation
Sankokushi (Three Engraved Intentions)	1996-08	Tabletop, Puzzle, Match, Mature	Arcade
Osman (Cannon Dancer)	1996-02	Platform, Fighting (Scrolling)	Arcade
Sotsugyo Shousho (Diploma)	1995-11	Mini-Games	Arcade
Pang! 3	1995-06	Platform, Puzzle, Shooter (Gallery)	Arcade
Ganbare! Gonta!! 2 (Party Time: Gonta the Diver II)	1995-05	Puzzle, Mature	Arcade
Charlie Ninja	1995	Platform, Shooter (Scrolling)	Arcade
Mirage Youjuu Mahjongden (Demon Mirage Mahjong)	1994-05	Tabletop, Mahjong, Mature	Arcade
Super-X [developed by Dooyong (Korea); published by NTC and Mitchell]	1994	Shooter (Flying Vertical)	Arcade
Double Wings	1993–12	Shooter (Flying Vertical)	Arcade
Moeyo Gonta!! (Lady Killer) [published by Yanyaka]	1993-12	Puzzle, Mature	Arcade
Chatan Yarakuu Shanku (The Karate Tournament)	1992-12	Fighting (Versus)	Arcade
Funky Jet [published by Data East]	1992-07	Platform, Fighting	Arcade
Pang Pom's [published by Metro]	1992	Platform, Puzzle	Arcade
Super Buster Bros.	1992-08	Platform, Puzzle, Shooter (Gallery)	Super NES
Mahjong Ikaga Desu ka (Mahjong How Are You)	1991?	Tabletop, Mahjong, Mature	Arcade
Super Buster Bros.	1990-11	Platform, Puzzle, Shooter (Gallery)	Arcade
Buster Bros.	1989-11	Platform, Puzzle, Shooter (Gallery)	Arcade
Mad Motor	1989	Fighting (2.5D)	Arcade
Poker Ladies	1989	Casino, Mature	Arcade
