= Chatan Yarakuu Shanku – The Karate Tournament =

1992 video game

- Developer: Mitchell Corporation
- Publisher: Mitchell Corporation
- Designers: Kouichi Yotsui (Isuke); Utata Kiyoshi
- Composer: Yoshi Sasaki
- Platform: Arcade
- Release: December 1, 1992
- Genre: 2D Versus Fighting
- Mode: Up to 2 players simultaneously

Chatan Yara Kuushanku - The Karate Tournament (チャタンヤラクーシャンク - THE KARATE TOURNAMENT), sometimes simply referred to either as Chatan Yara Kuushanku (チャタンヤラクーシャンク), or The Karate Tournament, is a 1992 karate-based fighting arcade game developed and published by Mitchell Corporation. It was released exclusively as an arcade game on December 1, 1992. The Japanese title refers to the karate kata of the same name.
