= Puzz Loop =

1998 video game

- Japanese PlayStation cover art
- Developer: Mitchell Corporation
- Publishers: Arcade; Mitchell Corporation; PlayStation: JP: Capcom; NA: Infogrames North America; EU: THQ; Nuon; Samsung; Neo Geo Pocket Color; SNK iOS; Hudson Soft
- Producer: Monte Singman
- Platforms: Arcade, Game Boy Color, PlayStation, Neo Geo Pocket Color, Nuon, iOS
- Release: Arcade: JP: December 1998; NA: December 1998; EU: January 1999; PlayStation: NA: November 2, 1999; JP: March 16, 2000; EU: October 20, 2000; Game Boy Color: NA: November 2, 1999; JP: March 17, 2000; Nuon: NA: July 2000; iOS: WW: August 4, 2008
- Genre: Puzzle
- Modes: Single-player, multiplayer
- Arcade system: Kaneko Super Nova System

Puzz Loop is an arcade tile-matching puzzle game developed by Mitchell Corporation and released in 1998 in Japan and North America and 1999 in Europe. It was later ported to the Game Boy Color, PlayStation and Samsung Nuon DVD players under the name Ballistic. The original Puzz Loop game was also known by this title. In 2008, publisher Hudson Soft released the game on App Store for the iPhone and iPod Touch. There was a Neo Geo Pocket Color version of the game initially planned to be published by SNK, but cancelled due to bankruptcy of the original incarnation of the company.

The original Puzz Loop was followed by a sequel, Puzz Loop 2, in 2001.

== Gameplay ==
In the game, marbles of different colors roll down a spiral path towards a central goal, which the player must stop by shooting new marbles using a cannon into the oncoming ones. The marbles disappear if player matches three or more marbles of the same color. In addition, marbles will roll backwards to close gaps if they are the same color as the marble on the other side of the gap, potentially causing chain reactions of clearances and setting back the advancing marbles. Also, collecting bonus items attached to marbles can temporarily slow down the rate the marbles advance or cause all the marbles of the same color to disappear. Once the marbles are pushed over the goal threshold, the game is over.

== Reception ==
In Japan, Game Machine listed Puzz Loop on their March 1, 1999 issue as being the eight most-successful arcade game of the month. Game Machine also listed Puzz Loop 2 on their April 1, 2001 issue as being the thirteenth most-successful arcade game of the month.

Jeff Lundrigan reviewed the PlayStation version of the game for Next Generation, rating it four stars out of five, and stated that "OK, so it's an ultimately derivative action puzzler; but give it a shot and we guarantee you won't want to put it down."

== Legacy ==
=== Sequel ===
Puzz Loop 2 is an arcade puzzle game by Mitchell Corporation released in 2001 on Capcom's CPS-2 hardware.

Gameplay is exactly the same as its predecessor, with the player needing to deplete all the colored balls before they hit the center of the screen. The most popular feature of Puzz Loop 2 was the two-player versus mode.

=== Clones ===
The success of Puzz Loop led to a number of clones with identical or nearly-identical gameplay from other companies including Zuma, the Luxor series, Tumblebugs, Potpourrii, Butterfly Escape, Loco, Bonsai Blast, and Bonbon Factory. Mitchell alleges that Zuma, one of the more popular clones, directly infringes on their intellectual property. In reply, Zuma developer PopCap Games asserts that their game is "not an exact clone", but an elaboration of Mitchell's original idea.

Mitchell itself released a version of the game for the Nintendo DS called Magnetica in 2006. A Wii version of Magnetica was released via WiiWare in 2008.

== See also ==
- Zuma (video game)
