= Polarium Advance =

2005 video game

- European box art
- Developer: Mitchell Corporation
- Publishers: WW: Nintendo; NA: Atlus
- Director: Takamitsu Hagiwara
- Composers: Tomokazu Abe; Toshiyuki Sudo
- Platform: Game Boy Advance
- Release: JP: October 13, 2005; EU: March 31, 2006; NA: November 13, 2006
- Genre: Puzzle
- Mode: Single-player

Polarium Advance (Note: Japanese: 通勤ヒトフデ, Hepburn: Tsūkin Hitofude; Single Stroke Commute) is a 2005 puzzle video game developed by Mitchell Corporation and published by Nintendo for the Game Boy Advance. Despite starting development before it, it is not a sequel to Polarium on the Nintendo DS. It was released in Japan in October 2005 and Europe in March 2006, with Atlus releasing it in North America in November 2006. The objective of the game is similar to that of its predecessor; black and white tiles fill a grid, and by drawing a single line in the grid, tiles can be flipped from black to white (or vice versa). Solid, horizontal lines of all black or all white tiles are erased, and the goal is to erase the entire grid in this manner.

The game received a re-release on the Wii U's Virtual Console. The game was planned to be released in China for the iQue Game Boy Advance system, but this release was cancelled due to high piracy. However, the Chinese translation was fully completed, and it can be played through emulation. However, the game's DS predecessor was released in China.

== Game modes ==
- Stage
  - Daily Polarium: This mode consists of 365 puzzles - one puzzle for each day in a year - and your goal is to solve one puzzle per day.
  - Polarium Reference: Here you can play groups of puzzles you have already cleared in Daily Polarium.
  - Edit and Custom: In these modes you can create and play, respectively, your own puzzles (up to 100). Initially, the only Special Tiles that can be used in your own puzzles are Hurdle tiles, but the other Special tiles can be unlocked during the regular game. You can also input puzzles by password, and the game is backwards compatible with passwords for Polarium.
- Time Attack: In this mode, you're given either 5 hard or 10 easy randomly generated puzzles, and have to solve them as fast as possible.

Unlike its predecessor, Polarium Advance was released for the Game Boy Advance, with some significant changes. The unpopular Challenge Mode was removed, and the game focuses more on the Puzzle Mode, which features 365 puzzles - nearly four times as many as Polarium. Each puzzle stage can be played in Stage Mode, with no time limit, or Time Mode, where the player aims to complete a puzzle as fast as possible. Edit Mode for creating custom puzzles makes a return in Polarium Advance as well.

The color scheme is changeable from black and white, to add a bit of customization and color to the game.

== How to play ==
As in the predecessor, the goal is to select tiles by drawing a line over them with one, continuous stroke. Polarium Advance uses the D-pad for controlling where Polarium used the DS stylus, and the A button (or L, for playing single-handed) for starting or ending a stroke. Selected tiles will flip from black to white or vice versa, and the puzzle is completed if each horizontal line consists of a single color afterwards. Surrounding the main puzzle area are gray "neutral" tiles that have no effect on the puzzle but can be used to flip disconnected groups of tiles in a single pass.

=== Special Tiles ===
In order to add some variety to the gameplay, three new tiles have been added in addition to the standard black and white ones. Solid tiles cause all tiles above them to fall when erased, Hurdle tiles cannot have lines drawn over them, and Multi-tiles are "wild cards" in that they function as white or black panels.

== Reception ==
Reception

Aggregate score
Aggregator	Score
Metacritic	73/100

Review scores
Publication	Score
Eurogamer	8/10
Famitsu	29/40
GameSpot	7/10

The game received "average" reviews according to the review aggregation website Metacritic. In Japan, Famitsu gave it a score of three sevens and one eight for a total of 29 out of 40.
