= Potpourrii =

2008 video game

- Developer: Abstraction Games
- Publisher: Abstraction Games
- Platform: Wii (WiiWare)
- Release: NA: September 15, 2008; EU: October 10, 2008
- Genre: Puzzle
- Modes: Single-player, multiplayer

Potpourrii is a WiiWare puzzle video game developed by Dutch studio Abstraction Games. It was released in North America on September 15, 2008, and in Europe on October 10, 2008.

== Gameplay ==
Potpourrii is played similar to the games Puzz Loop and Puzzle Bobble. The plot of the game revolves around a group of gnomes repairing their magical forest after a chaotic rampage by an evil warlock frees all the forest spirits. The object of the game is for the player to contain these spirits by matching three or more spirits of the same type in order to make them disappear.

Players shoot spirits from a cannon on a track that surrounds a swirling whirlpool (the "potpourii") where the spirits are suspended, with each quadrant of the play area corresponding to a different season and the different types of spirits players can shoot. The twist is that instead of simply matching the required number of spirits, the player must add to the cluster a different type of spirit that reacts to them and allows the cluster to disappear.

== Reception ==
IGN gave the game 5/10, noting that the "sluggish, sloppy controls" and the lack of a tutorial hurt the game, ultimately claiming Potpourrii is "far too complicated for its own good". However, they did have praise for its "mellow and happy" audio and graphics, despite the latter's muddled and confusing interface. WiiWare World also gave it 5/10, praising its "crisp visuals, captivating art style and cutesy music" yet also disappointed by its "extremely sluggish" gameplay and frustrating control. They also echoed the sentiment about the lack of a tutorial, feeling the game is "a complex and confusing setup for newcomers and the initial difficulty is likely to alienate many gamers". Gaming Target gave the puzzler a 6.7/10 for its original twist on the puzzle genre but also bemoaned about the lack of a tutorial.
