= Ponpoko =

1982 video game

- Developer(s): Sigma Enterprises
- Publisher(s): Sigma Enterprises (JP); Venture Line (NA)
- Platform(s): Arcade
- Release: JP: November 1982; NA: January 1983
- Genre(s): Platform
- Mode(s): Single-player

Ponpoko (Japanese: ポンポコ) is a fixed screen platform game developed and published by Sigma Enterprises. It was released in arcades in Japan in November 1982. As a Japanese raccoon dog which can jump and climb ladders, the goal is to collect all of the fruits and vegetables in each level. Ponpoko was sold in North America by Venture Line as a conversion kit starting in January 1983.

== Gameplay ==
In Ponpoko, the player controls a Tanuki (狸 or たぬき), or Japanese raccoon dog, that can climb ladders, walk across platforms, and jump over deadly apple cores and gaps. Colorful creatures (called hairy caterpillars by Sigma, scorpions by Venture Line) move horizontally from one side of the screen to the other and back again, floating over gaps in the platforms. A mystery pot usually gives bonus points when collected, but certain pots in each level always release a snake. Both caterpillars and snakes are deadly to the touch.

== Reception ==
In Japan, Game Machine listed Ponpoko on their August 15, 1983 issue as being the fifteenth most-successful table arcade unit of the month.
