= Super Buster Bros. =

1990 shooter video game

Super Buster Brothers
- Packaging for the Super NES version
- Developer: Mitchell Corporation (Note: Ported to Super NES by Capcom.)
- Publisher: Capcom: JP: Mitchell Corporation (Arcade)
- Designers: Toshihiko Uda; Futoshi Kuwahara
- Composers: Tatsuya Nishimura; Minae Fujii
- Platforms: Arcade, Super NES
- Release: Arcade: NA/JP: 1990; Super NES: JP: August 7, 1992; NA: October 1992; EU: 1992
- Genre: Shooter
- Modes: Single-player, multiplayer

Super Buster Bros., released as Super Pang (Note: Japanese: スーパーパン) outside of North America, is a cooperative two-player shooting puzzle arcade video game developed by Mitchell and released in the United States in 1990 by Capcom. It is the second game in the Pang series and was ported to the Super Nintendo Entertainment System in 1992. It is also featured in the compilations Buster Bros. Collection for the original PlayStation and Capcom Puzzle World for PlayStation Portable.

== Gameplay ==
The object of the game is to take the role as Buster (P1) or Kutch (P2) to use their guns to pop bubbles that bounce around the screen. There are two different modes: Panic mode and Arcade mode. Similarly to Asteroids, when a player pops a bubble, it splits into two smaller bubbles. Sufficiently small bubbles simply vaporize when popped. Occasionally, monsters walk or fly on to the screen. When the player character touches the bubble or the timer reaches zero, they die. Monsters can also pop bubbles. Although the arcade game and the PlayStation version included in Buster Bros. Collection allow two players to play simultaneously, the Super NES version only has one player mode. Powerups are found by popping certain bubbles, shooting boxes, or shooting certain unmarked spots in the level. The gun power-ups cannot be used in conjunction with each other.

=== Panic mode ===
In this mode, the player faces a rain of bubbles. The default weapon is the bubble shot and cannot be changed at any time. Every time a bubble is popped, a rainbow bar at the bottom is slowly filled. Filling the bar all the way causes the player to advance to the next level. As more bubbles are popped, the remaining and incoming bubbles move faster.

There is also one special type of bubble that appears rarely. The bubble can appear at any random time, and has a clock image engraved. Whenever the bubble bounces, the engraving changes to a star, and when the bubble bounces again, the engraving changes back to a clock. Popping the bubble when the clock engraving is present causes all bubbles to stop movement completely for 9 seconds, while popping the bubble when the star engraving is present causes all bubbles to be popped and the game screen gets cleared, filling the rainbow bar with every pop made from the bubbles that are being destroyed.

Panic mode is beaten when the player reaches level 99, fills the rainbow bar and destroys any remaining bubbles on the screen (after the bar is filled and level 99 is reached, no new bubbles appear). The ending of the game is different in panic mode than in Arcade mode.

=== Arcade mode ===
In this mode, each of the stages has a set layout, consisting of walls, destructible glass walls, invisible walls, ladders and ice. There are items such as candy and 1-ups. In the SNES version, there are four difficulty levels in the arcade mode: easy, normal, hard and expert. Each difficulty has their own stage layouts, some remaining the same, some varying slightly and some changed completely. The amount of continues and general speed of bubbles is also affected by the difficulty level chosen.

== Reception ==
Reception

Aggregate score
Aggregator	Score
GameRankings	70.50% (SNES)

Review score
Publication	Score
Electronic Gaming Monthly	4/10, 7/10, 7/10, 8/10 (SNES)

In Japan, Game Machine listed Super Buster Bros. on their January 1, 1991 issue as being the eight most-successful table arcade unit of the month, outperforming titles such as Carrier Air Wing and Columns.

In 1995, Total! ranked Super Buster Bros. 83rd on their Top 100 SNES Games writing: "Otherwise known as Super Pang this is an unusual game in which you break up bouncing bubbles."
