= The Potpourri =

Weekly newspaper in Texas, US

- Type: Weekly newspaper
- Format: Broadsheet
- Owner: Hearst Corporation
- Publisher: Houston Community Newspapers
- Editor: Roy Kent
- Founded: 1976
- Headquarters: 21901 Tomball Parkway, Suite 500; Houston, Texas 77070; United States
- Circulation: 31,500 weekly
- Price: Free
- Website: themagnoliapotpourri.com thetomballpotpourri.com

The Potpourri, a weekly newspaper, covers the communities of Tomball and Magnolia, which are located north west of Houston, Texas. The publication publishes separate editions for each community. The communities are neighbors and span two counties: Harris and Montgomery counties. The publications have weekly circulations of more than 31,500 and have a current estimated readership of 90,000. The broadsheet publication is distributed free every Wednesday. The Potpourri is in its 45th year. The publication has had various owners throughout that time and began as a place mat featuring community news in restaurants.

It was owned by ASP Westward LP until 2012, when it was acquired by 1013 Star Communications as part of its acquisition of Houston Community Newspapers. In 2016, the Hearst Corporation acquired Houston Community Newspapers; it is the parent company of the Houston Chronicle. As part of the deal the Potpourri became a part of the Hearst Corporation.
