= Pollux (video game) =

1991 video game

- Developer: Dooyong
- Publisher: Atlus
- Platform: Arcade
- Release: 1991
- Genre: Scrolling shooter
- Modes: Single-player, multiplayer

Pollux (ポラックス) is a vertically scrolling shooter. It was developed by Dooyong and published by Atlus, released only in Asian arcades in 1991.

== Plot ==
As a part of mankind's future space development project, an enormous, automated space station called Pollux is developed. Pollux is equipped with an artificial brain that acquires so much intelligence that it makes its own personality, gender and exceeds the minds of its creators. However, Pollux starts to dwell on the thought of evil so much that it starts attacking those it was supposed to service. The player assumes control of a space fighter pilot assigned to destroy Pollux before it takes any more lives.

== Gameplay ==
The player's fighter can pick-up the following items:

- P - Power-Up
- A - Auto Fire
- S - Speed Up
- B - Fire Bomb
- U - 1Up
- Missile - Homing Missile
- Twin Blocks - Power Laser: This fired a barrage of straightforward twin laser shots.
- Cross - Cross Space Laser: This would fire Wave shots in three directions: to the ship's left and right as well as two straight forward shots.
- Arrow - Backwards Beam: A beam weapon capable of firing behind the ship.
