= Nintendo DS =

Handheld game console

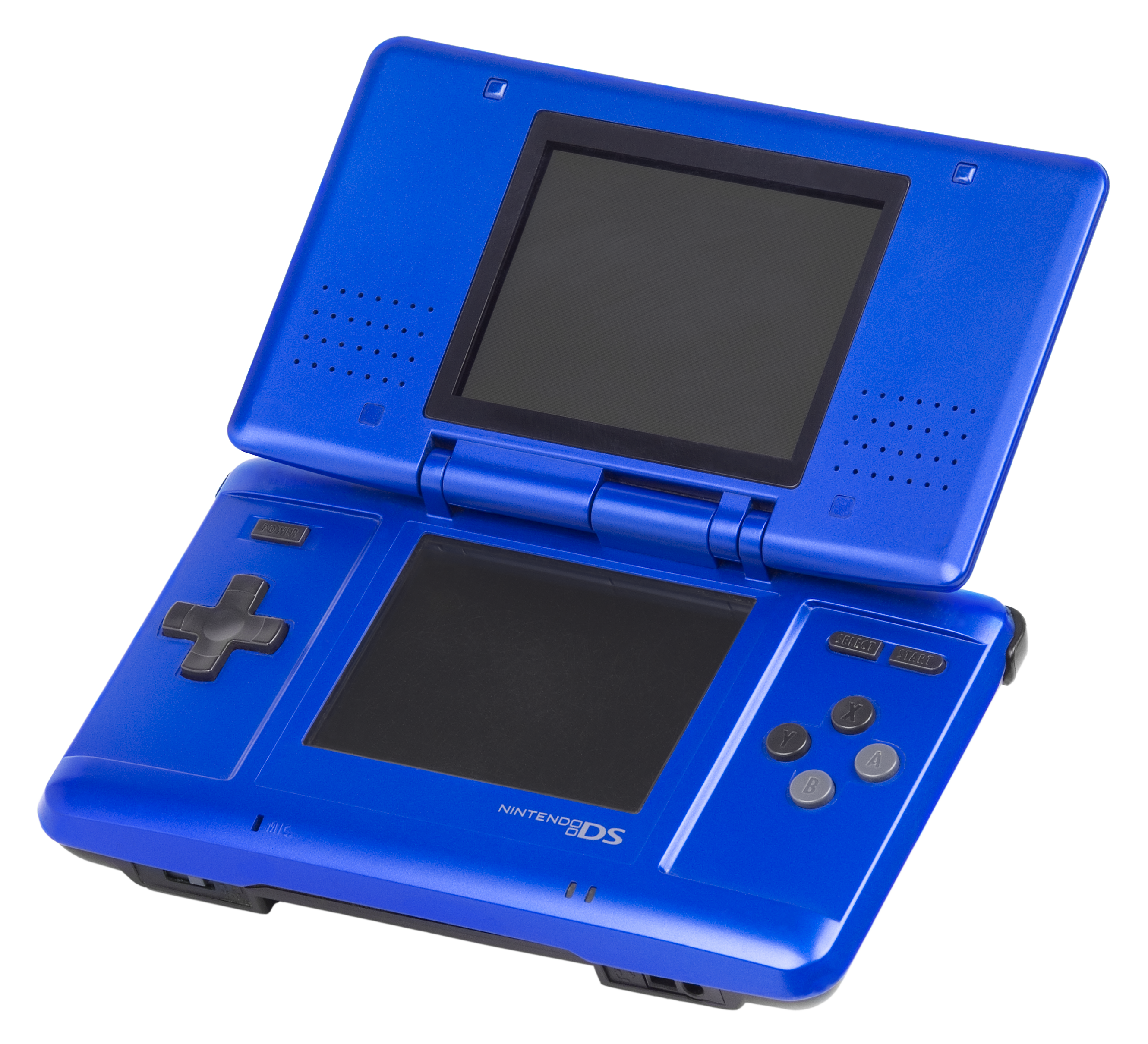
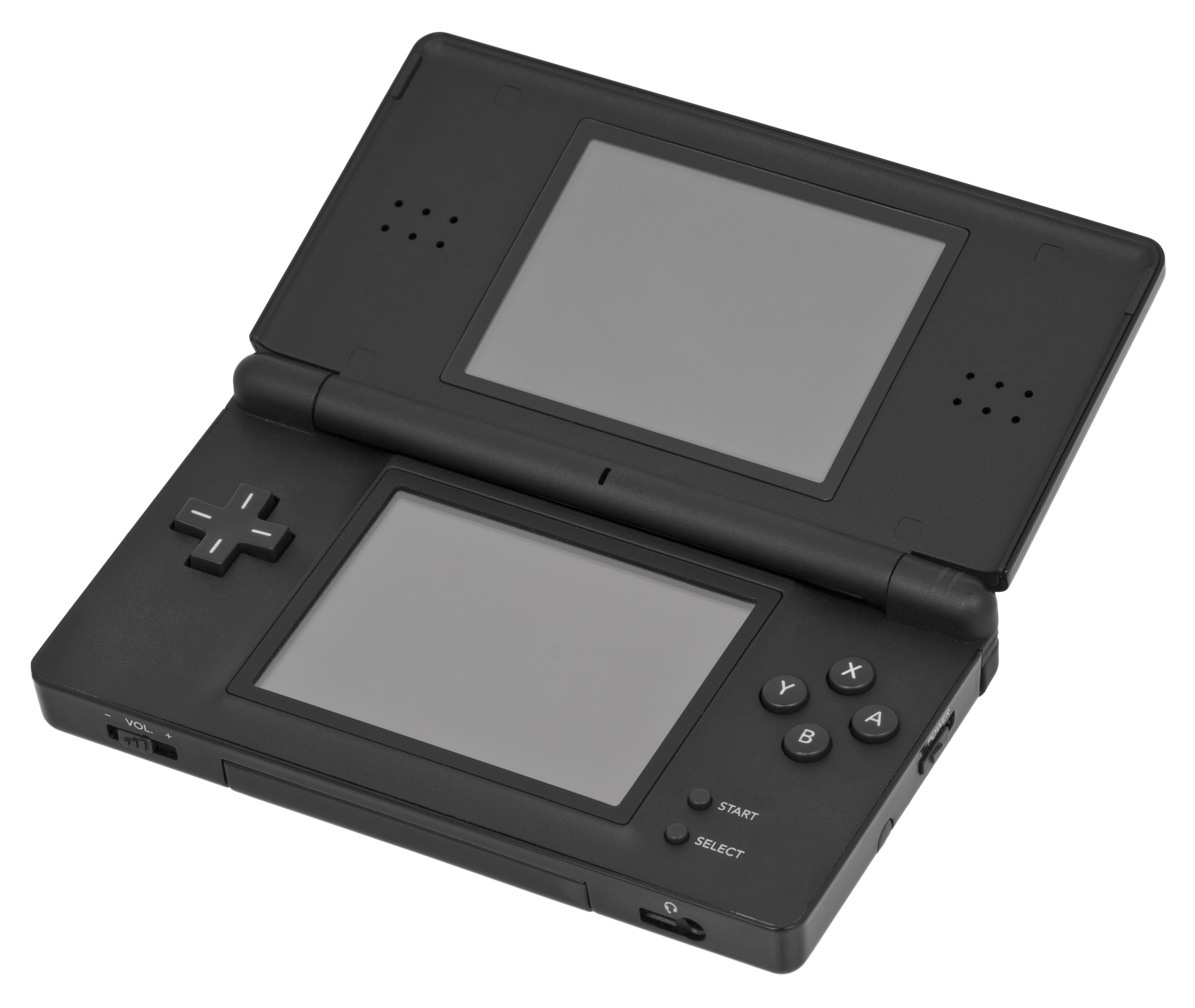
- Top: Original Nintendo DS in Electric Blue; Bottom: Nintendo DS Lite in Onyx
- Codename: Nitro
- Developer: Nintendo
- Manufacturer: Foxconn
- Product family: Nintendo DS
- Type: Handheld game console
- Generation: Seventh
- Released: November 21, 2004: DS: NA: November 21, 2004; JP: December 2, 2004; AU: February 24, 2005; EU: March 11, 2005 DS Lite: JP: March 2, 2006; AU: June 1, 2006; NA: June 11, 2006; EU: June 23, 2006
- Introductory price: US$149.99 (equivalent to $260 in 2025); ¥15,000 (equivalent to ¥17,040 in 2024); £99 (equivalent to £180 in 2025); €149.99 (equivalent to €220 in 2023)
- Discontinued: Yes; date undisclosed
- Units sold: 154 million (Note: Total: 154.02 million; DS (original): 19.57 million (12.9%); DS Lite: 93.08 million (60.4%); DSi: 28.44 million (18.5%); DSi XL: 12.93 million (8.4%)) (details)
- Media: Nintendo DS Game Card; Game Boy Advance Game Pak
- CPU: 67 MHz ARM946E-S; 33 MHz ARM7TDMI
- Memory: 4 MB RAM
- Storage: Cartridge save 256 MB flash memory
- Display: Two 3" TFT LCDs, 256 × 192 pixels
- Input: D-Pad; 8 x digital buttons (Y, B, A, X, L, R, Select, Start); Resistive touchscreen; Microphone
- Connectivity: Wi-Fi (802.11b)
- Online services: Nintendo Wi-Fi Connection
- Dimensions: DS: 148.7 × 84.7 × 28.9 mm (5.85 × 3.33 × 1.14 in); DS Lite: 133 × 73.9 × 21.5 mm (5.24 × 2.91 × 0.85 in)
- Weight: DS: 275 g (9.7 oz); DS Lite: 218 g (7.7 oz)
- Best-selling game: New Super Mario Bros. (30.80 million) (list)
- Backward compatibility: Game Boy Advance
- Predecessor: Game Boy Advance
- Successor: Nintendo 3DS
- Related: Nintendo DSi

The Nintendo DS (Note: Japanese: ニンテンドーDS, Hepburn: Nintendō Dī Esu) is a foldable handheld game console developed by Nintendo and released worldwide between 2004 and 2005. The "DS" in the name is an initialism for "Dual Screen", reflecting the system's most distinctive feature: two LCD screens working in tandem, with the lower screen functioning as a touchscreen. Both screens are housed in a clamshell design similar to that of the Game Boy Advance SP and some models of the Game & Watch series. The DS was among the first portable consoles to support wireless connectivity for local multiplayer over short distances, as well as online play through the now-defunct Nintendo Wi-Fi Connection service. Its primary competitor during the seventh generation of video game consoles was Sony's PlayStation Portable.

Initially marketed as an experimental "third pillar" in Nintendo's console lineup—complementing the handheld Game Boy Advance family and the home console GameCube—the DS's backward compatibility with Game Boy Advance titles and strong sales led it to be widely regarded as the successor to the Game Boy line. A slimmer model, the Nintendo DS Lite, which features brighter screens and improved battery life, was released in 2006.

The DS and DS Lite were followed by the Nintendo DSi, a revision released on November 1, 2008. The DSi added dual digital cameras, larger screens, more memory, a faster processor, and internal flash memory, and it was later offered in a larger DSi XL model. It also introduced digital distribution of games, but lost compatibility with Game Boy Advance cartridges. Although hundreds of downloadable titles were available, only six DSi-exclusive game cards were released. The DS line was ultimately succeeded by the Nintendo 3DS in February 2011.

Including the DS Lite and DSi models, the Nintendo DS has sold 154 million units, becoming the best-selling Nintendo console until it was surpassed by the Nintendo Switch in 2025. It also ranks as the third best-selling video game console of all time, behind the PlayStation 2 and the Switch. The DS Lite accounted for over 60 percent of total DS hardware shipments.

== History ==
=== Development ===
Development of the Nintendo DS began around mid-2002, as company president Hiroshi Yamauchi stepped down and assumed an advisory role. At the time, he proposed that Nintendo explore a system built around two screens.

Satoru Iwata succeeded Yamauchi as president in May 2002. He acknowledged that Nintendo had fallen behind industry trends, particularly online gaming, and sought to broaden the company's audience beyond traditional gamers. Internal research suggested that Nintendo's past emphasis on unconventional hardware had complicated third-party development and weakened its competitiveness. Iwata therefore supported development of a dual-screen handheld that would offer distinctive new ways to play, be more accessible to non-traditional audiences, and easier for developers to support. Because Nintendo believed consumers were unlikely to pay recurring fees for online services, the design emphasized wireless functionality to enable local multiplayer and new interactive experiences without subscriptions.

On January 20, 2004, Nintendo announced that it would release a new dual-screen game device under the codename "Nintendo DS", describing it as an experimental "third pillar" alongside the Game Boy Advance and GameCube rather than a replacement for either. Few technical details were initially disclosed, other than that it would feature two 3-inch TFT LCD displays, dual processors, and up to 128 MB of memory.

In March 2004, a leaked document revealed additional technical specifications, including that one of the screens would be touch sensitive, and identified the internal development name "Nitro". The prototype was shown publicly in May at E3 2004 in Los Angeles, where Nintendo of America president Reggie Fils-Aimé noted that the design would change before launch. On July 28, 2004, Nintendo unveiled a redesigned, "sleeker and more elegant" version and confirmed Nintendo DS as the final name.

Iwata characterized the DS as Nintendo's first hardware launch in support of its "Gaming Population Expansion" strategy, highlighting that its touch-based interface would allow for intuitive play, and described the project as "a completely different concept from existing game devices", intended to reassert the company's reputation for innovation.

In February 2004, while the Nintendo DS was still in development and amid concern over the GameCube's lukewarm performance, Yamauchi stated, "If the DS succeeds, we will rise to heaven, but if it fails we will sink to hell".

=== Launch ===
On September 20, 2004, Nintendo announced that the Nintendo DS would launch in North America on November 21, 2004, for US$149.99 (equivalent to $260 in 2025) followed by releases in Japan on December 2 for ¥15,000 (equivalent to ¥17,040 in 2024), in Australia and New Zealand on February 24, 2005, for A$199.95 (equivalent to $310 in 2022) or NZ$249 ($420 in 2026), and in Europe on March 11, 2005, for €149.99 or £99.99 (equivalent to £180 in 2025). The North American debut was marked by a midnight launch event in Los Angeles, while the Japanese launch was comparatively subdued, reportedly in part because of the winter weather.

Nintendo released the DS in North America ahead of Japan, its first hardware launch to follow that order, to position the system for the U.S. holiday shopping season and Black Friday. Demand exceeded expectations: more than three million preorders were placed across North America and Japan, quickly exhausting many retailers' allocations. Nintendo initially planned to ship about one million units combined for both launches but added production capacity after seeing preorder volumes. For the U.S. launch, 550,000 units were shipped (up from a planned 300,000), with just over 500,000 sold in the first week. The system reached one million units sold in the United States by December 21, 2004, and worldwide shipments totaled 2.8 million by the end of the year—roughly 800,000 above Nintendo's forecast. By June 2005, global sales had reached 6.65 million units, and some commentators likened its popularity to the "Tickle Me Elmo" craze of 1996.

Some early units were reported to have stuck pixels, as was common with LCD displays of the time. Nintendo of America launched a program to repair or replace screens if the owner felt that the stuck pixels interfered with their gaming experience.

==== China ====
The Nintendo DS was released in China on July 23, 2005, by Nintendo's localization partner iQue as the iQue DS. This version featured updated firmware to block game piracy and was also released in a new red color. Five games were localized for the system. The iQue DS is the only Nintendo DS model with regional lockout: games designed for it cannot be played on DS systems from other regions, although games from other regions are compatible with the iQue DS.

==== Games available on launch ====
Title	Publisher	NA	JP	EU	AU/ NZ	CN
Asphalt: Urban GT	Gameloft	Yes	No	Yes	Yes	No
Daigasso! Band Brothers	Nintendo	No	Yes	No	No	No
Feel the Magic: XY/XX	Sega	Yes	Yes	Yes	No	No
Kensyūi Dokuta Tendo (lit. 'Resident Doctor Tendo')	Spike Chunsoft	No	Yes	No	No	No
Madden NFL 2005	Electronic Arts	Yes	No	No	No	No
Mahjong Taikai	Koei	No	Yes	No	No	No
Metroid Prime Hunters: First Hunt	Nintendo	Yes	No	Yes	No	No
Mr. Driller Drill Spirits	Namco	No	Yes	Yes	No	No
Ping Pals	THQ	No	No	Yes	Yes	No
Pokémon Dash	Nintendo	No	Yes	Yes	No	No
Polarium	Nintendo	No	Yes	Yes	No	Yes
Rayman DS	Ubisoft	No	No	Yes	No	No
Retro Atari Classics	Atari	No	No	Yes	No	No
Robots	VU Games	No	No	Yes	No	No
Spider-Man 2	Activision	Yes	No	Yes	Yes	No
Sprung	Ubisoft	No	No	Yes	Yes	No
Super Mario 64 DS	Nintendo	Yes	Yes	Yes	Yes	No
Tiger Woods PGA Tour	Electronic Arts	No	No	Yes	Yes	No
The Urbz: Sims in the City	Electronic Arts	Yes	Yes	Yes	No	No
WarioWare: Touched!	Nintendo	No	Yes	Yes	Yes	Yes
Zoo Keeper	Success	No	Yes	Yes	Yes	No
Zunō ni Asekaku Game Series Vol. 1: Cool 104 Joker & Setline	Aruze	No	Yes	No	No	No

=== Promotion ===
The system's promotional slogans use the word "Touch" in almost all countries, with the North American slogan being "Touching is good."

The Nintendo DS was seen by many analysts to be in the same market as Sony's PlayStation Portable, although representatives from both companies stated that each system targeted a different audience. Time magazine awarded the DS a Gadget of the Week award.

At the time of its release in the United States, the Nintendo DS retailed for US$149.99. The price dropped to US$129.99 on August 21, 2005, one day before the release of Nintendogs and Advance Wars: Dual Strike.

Nine official colors of the Nintendo DS were available through standard retailers. Titanium-colored units were available worldwide; Electric Blue was exclusive to North and Latin America. There was also a red version which was bundled with the game Mario Kart DS. Graphite Black, Pure White, Turquoise Blue, and Candy Pink were available in Japan. Mystic Pink and Cosmic Blue were available in Australia and New Zealand. Japan's Candy Pink and Australia's Cosmic Blue were also available in Europe and North America through a Nintendogs bundle, although the colors are just referred to as pink and blue; however, these colors were available only for the original style Nintendo DS; a different and more-limited set of colors were used for the Nintendo DS Lite.

=== DS Lite ===
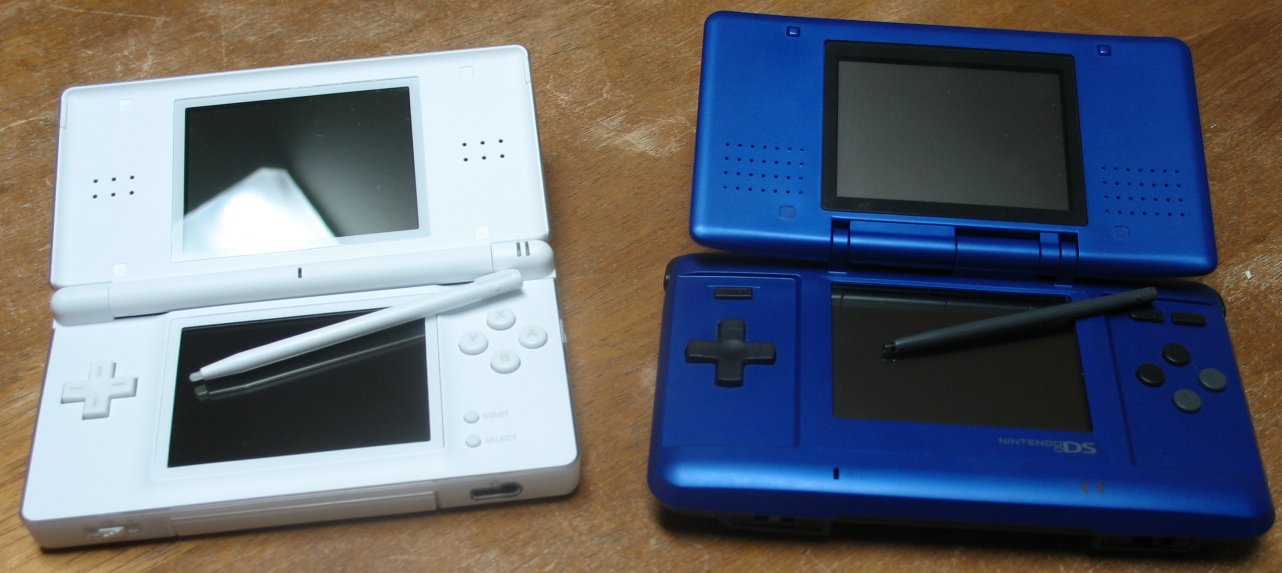
A Nintendo DS Lite (left) and an original DS (right)

The Nintendo DS Lite was announced on January 26, 2006, and showcased at E3 2006 the following May. The system launched in Japan on March 2, 2006. Heavy demand led to widespread shortages, and some retailers raised prices above list price. Nintendo shipped 550,000 units in March 2006, exceeding expectations, yet the console sold out quickly. To address demand, the company shipped an additional 700,000 units in April, but retailers were again sold out by late May. Shortages continued through much of 2006 and 2007.

The DS Lite launched in Australia on June 1, 2006, bundled with a demo of Brain Age. North America followed on June 11, 2006, with reports that some major chains sold units ahead of the official date. By June 12, most major U.S. retailers had sold out, and Nintendo reported sales of 136,500 units within the first two days.

In Europe, the DS Lite was released on June 23, 2006, with early launches in Finland and Sweden to avoid the Midsummer holiday. Nintendo reported sales of 200,000 units across Europe in the first ten days. During the launch period, a shipment of consoles and games valued at HK$18 million (US$2.32 million, equivalent to 3.47 million in 2025) was stolen in Hong Kong while in transit to Europe.

Following the establishment of Nintendo of Korea in July 2006, the DS Lite became the subsidiary's first console release on January 18, 2007. Promoted by actors Jang Dong-gun and Ahn Sung-ki, it sold more than one million units in South Korea within its first year, reaching 1.4 million by April 2008.

The Nintendo DS Lite was reportedly discontinued in April 2011.

=== Sales ===
As of March 31, 2016, all Nintendo DS models combined have sold 154.02 million units. The majority of these were made up of the first revision model, the DS Lite, according to Nintendo.

=== Legacy ===
The Nintendo DS introduced touchscreen controls and wireless online gaming to a broad audience. Damien McFerran of Nintendo Life wrote that the "DS was the first encounter many people had with touch-based tech, and it left an indelible impression." It established a large casual gaming market, attracting non-traditional gamers and setting touchscreens as a standard for future portable devices. Jeremy Parish, writing for Polygon stated that the DS, "had basically primed the entire world for" the iPhone (released in January 2007), laying the groundwork for touchscreen mobile gaming apps, though he noted that the success of the iPhone "effectively caused the DS market to implode" by the early 2010s.

The DS also broadened the market for female gamers. In 2006, Nintendo reported that 44% of DS owners were female, with the majority of Nintendogs players being women.

The system was followed by the Nintendo DSi, released on November 1, 2008, which added dual digital cameras and digital game distribution, while removing backward compatibility with Game Boy Advance titles. A larger variant, originally planned as a DS Lite variant, was released as the Nintendo DSi XL.

The success of the DS also paved the way for the Nintendo 3DS, a dual-screen handheld capable of displaying stereoscopic 3D on the top screen.

On January 29, 2014, Nintendo announced that DS games would be added to the Wii U's Virtual Console, with Brain Age being the first released in Japan on June 3, 2014.

== Hardware ==
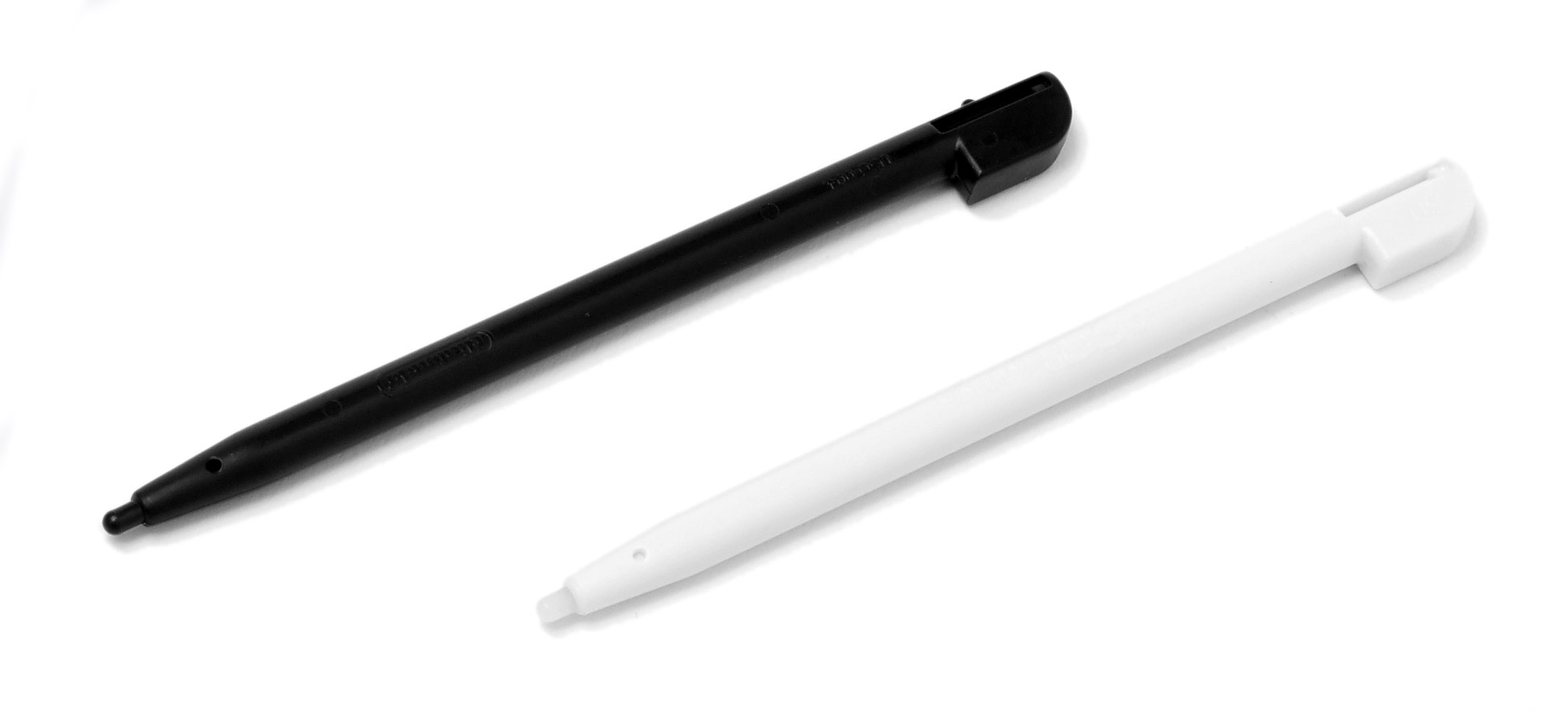
Stylus for the DS Lite

The design of the Nintendo DS recalls earlier Nintendo products, including the dual-screen series of the Game & Watch line—such as Donkey Kong and Zelda—as well as the clamshell Game Boy Advance SP.

The system uses two 3-inch (diagonal) TFT LCDs, each with a resolution of 256 × 192 pixels and a 4:3 aspect ratio. The lower screen is covered by a resistive touchscreen that accepts input from a finger or the included stylus, which is stored in a holder on the device. The system also features a D-pad (referred to by Nintendo as the "+Control Pad"), six action buttons on its front (A, B, X, Y, Start, and Select), and two shoulder buttons (L and R). The overall layout resembles the Super Nintendo Entertainment System controller. The top edge houses the game card slot and power connector (the same as used with the Game Boy Advance SP), while the bottom includes the slot for Game Boy Advance cartridges.

Stereo speakers—positioned on either side of the upper display—can provide virtual surround sound. A built-in microphone sits below the lower screen and is used for features such as speech recognition, voice chat, and gameplay actions that require the player to blow or shout into it.

The Nintendo DS contains two processors that operate together in an asymmetric configuration. One is an ARM7TDMI—the same as in the Game Boy Advance but clocked at twice the speed, 34 MHz—which handles input/output functions and provides backward compatibility with Game Boy Advance software. The second is an ARM946E-S running at 67 MHz, which performs most of the system's primary processing. The two processors share tasks and exchange data as required by software.

The console includes several types of memory: 32 kB of work RAM shared between both processors, an additional 64 kB accessible only to the ARM7, and 4 MB of PSRAM used as the main system memory. The system also contains 256 kB of flash memory that stores the firmware, user preferences, and certain system settings; firmware updates were not intended to be installed by the user.

The DS has 656 kB of video memory and two 2D graphics engines (one for each screen), which are more capable than the single engine in the Game Boy Advance. The system's 3D hardware includes a geometry and rendering engine capable of effects such as texture mapping, alpha blending, Gouraud shading, cel shading, and basic lighting. Because it uses nearest-neighbor texture filtering, some games appear blocky. It is also constrained by a fixed polygon budget—about 2,048 triangles per frame—and renders 3D to only one screen at a time, making dual-screen 3D difficult and performance-intensive. The DS also includes 512 kB of texture memory and supports textures up to 1024 × 1024 pixels.

The Nintendo DS supports Wi-Fi via the IEEE 802.11b standard, optionally with WEP encryption, enabling local multiplayer over short distances and online play through the now-defunct Nintendo Wi-Fi Connection service. These standards are now considered outdated, and WEP in particular is regarded as insecure.

Nintendo states that the rechargeable 850 mAh lithium-ion battery lasts up to 10 hours under ideal conditions after a 4-hour charge, though actual life depends on factors such as volume, screen brightness, wireless use, and whether one or both screens are active. The battery is user-replaceable with a Phillips screwdriver, and capacity declines after roughly 500 charge cycles.

Closing the system activates a sleep mode that pauses most games and conserves power by turning off the screens, speakers, and wireless features. Sleep mode does not function while playing Game Boy Advance titles, and some DS games do not pause. A few titles incorporate closing the system into gameplay.

=== Nintendo DS Lite ===
The Nintendo DS Lite is a redesign of the Nintendo DS. While retaining the original model's core features, it features a slimmer case, a larger stylus, improved battery life, and brighter displays. The top screen has a maximum brightness of 200 cd/m^{2}, while the lower touch screen reaches 190 cd/m^{2}. Its 1000 mAh lithium-ion battery provides approximately 15–19 hours of play after about three hours of charging. The DS Lite uses a different AC adapter from the original Nintendo DS and the Game Boy Advance SP due to a smaller power port on the top of the unit. The included stylus is 1 cm longer and 2 mm thicker than that of the original model.

Nintendo DS Lite hardware gallery
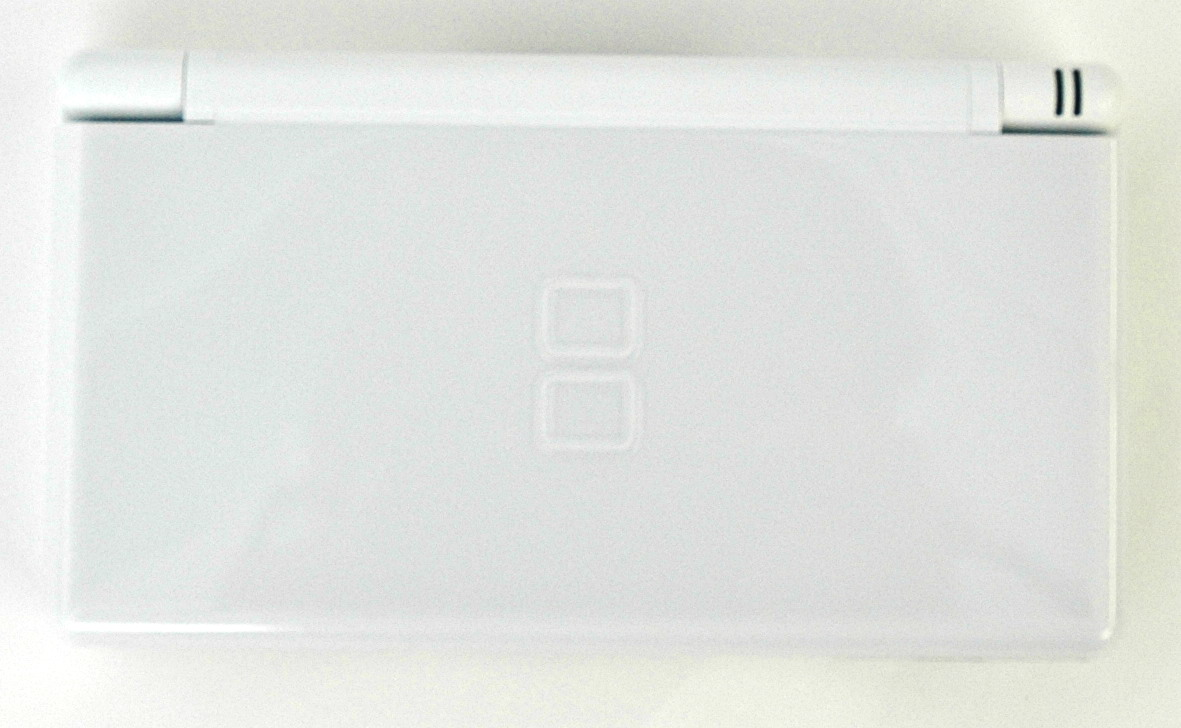
The Nintendo DS Lite, closed

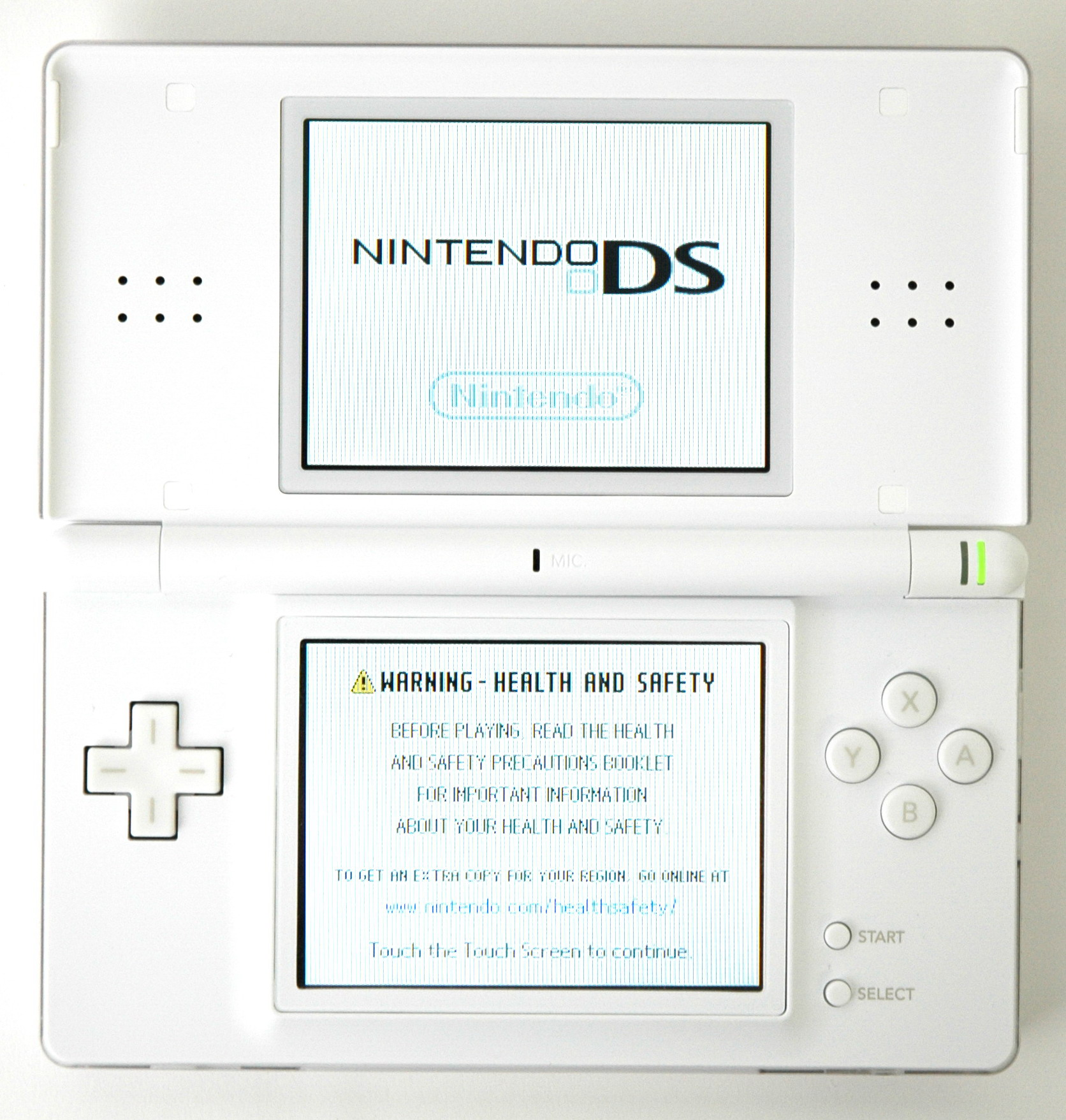
The Nintendo DS Lite, turned on and fully open

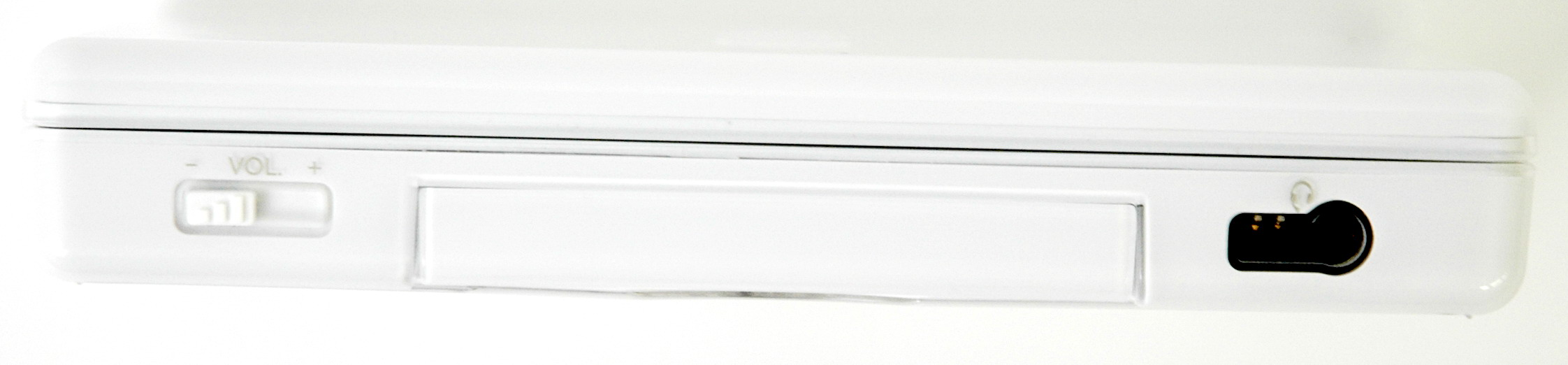
The front, with the volume slider, Game Boy Advance slot, and headphone/microphone jack

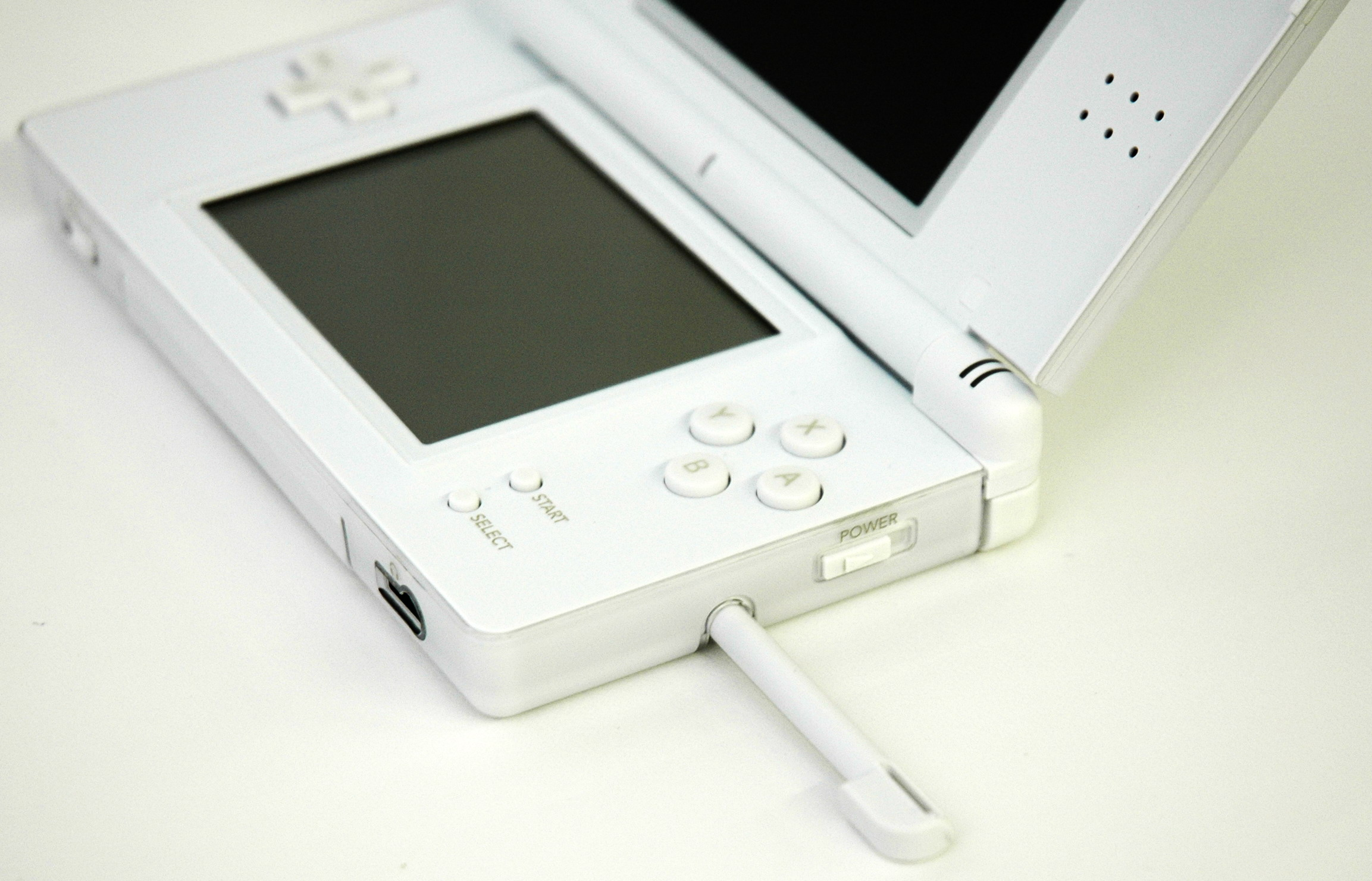
Remodeled stylus and relocated Start and Select buttons, and power switch

=== Technical specifications ===
Name	Nintendo DS	Nintendo DS Lite	Nintendo DSi	Nintendo DSi XL
Logo				
Console				
In production	Discontinued			
Generation	Seventh generation			
Release date	NA: November 21, 2004; JP: December 2, 2004; AU: February 24, 2005; EU: March 11, 2005	JP: March 2, 2006; AU: June 1, 2006; NA: June 11, 2006; EU: June 23, 2006	JP: November 1, 2008; AU: April 2, 2009; EU: April 3, 2009; NA: April 5, 2009	JP: November 21, 2009; EU: March 5, 2010; NA: March 28, 2010; AU: April 15, 2010
Launch price	US$149.99	US$129.99	US$169.99	US$189.99
Current price	Discontinued			
Units shipped	Worldwide: 154.02 million (as of June 30, 2016)			
Display	76 mm (3.00 in)		83 mm (3.25 in)	110 mm (4.2 in)
Display	256x192 px			
Processor	67 MHz ARM946E-S & 33 MHz ARM7TDMI		133 MHz ARM9 & 33 MHz ARM7	
Memory	4 MB PSRAM		16 MB	
Camera	No		One front-facing and one outward-facing 0.3 MP	
Storage	256 KB of serial flash memory		256 MB of internal flash memory with an SD card (up to 2 GB) and SDHC card (up to 32 GB) expansion slot	
Physical media	Game Boy Advance Game Pak; Nintendo DS Game Card		Nintendo DS Game Card; Nintendo DSi Game Card	
Input controls	Power Button; Volume slider; Eight digital buttons (A, B, X, Y, L, R, Start, Select); D-pad; Resistive touchscreen (lower screen only); Microphone	Power flick-switch; Volume slider; Eight digital buttons (A, B, X, Y, L, R, Start, Select); D-pad; Resistive touchscreen (lower screen only); Microphone	Power button; Ten digital buttons (A, B, X, Y, L, R, Start, Select, Volume Up, Volume Down); D-pad; Resistive touchscreen (lower screen only); Microphone; Front and back cameras	
Battery	850 mAh lithium-ion battery ~10 hours (Note: Determined by screen brightness, Wi-Fi, sound volume)	1000 mAh lithium-ion battery 15–19 hours	840 mAh lithium-ion battery 9–14 hours	1040 mAh lithium-ion battery 4–17 hours
Weight	275 g (9.7 oz)	218 g (7.7 oz)	214 g (7.5 oz)	314 g (11.1 oz)
Dimensions	W: 148.7 mm (5.85 in); H: 84.7 mm (3.33 in); D: 28.9 mm (1.14 in)	W: 133 mm (5.24 in); H: 73.9 mm (2.91 in); D: 21.5 mm (0.85 in)	W: 136.9 mm (5.39 in); H: 74.9 mm (2.95 in); D: 18.8 mm (0.74 in)	W: 161 mm (6.34 in); H: 91.4 mm (3.60 in); D: 21 mm (0.83 in)
Regional lockout	No		Only for DSiWare and DSi-enhanced/exclusive Game Cards	
Backward compatibility	Physical only Game Boy Advance Cartridge		Physical only Nintendo DS Game Cards	

=== Accessories ===
Although the secondary port on the Nintendo DS accepts Game Boy Advance cartridges (but not Game Boy or Game Boy Color cartridges), Nintendo stated that its primary purpose was to support a range of accessories for the system.

==== Rumble Pak ====
The Rumble Pak was the first accessory designed for the expansion slot. Shaped like a Game Boy Advance cartridge, it provides force feedback in compatible games. It was released in North America and Japan in 2005 bundled with Metroid Prime Pinball. In Europe, it was first bundled with Actionloop and later with Metroid Prime Pinball, and was also sold separately.

==== Headset ====
The Nintendo DS Headset is an official headset that connects to the combination headphone–microphone jack on the bottom of the system. It includes a single earphone and microphone and works with games that support voice input. It was released alongside Pokémon Diamond and Pearl in North America and Australia.

==== Browser ====
On February 15, 2006, Nintendo announced a version of the Opera web browser for the system. The browser can use one screen as an overview with a zoomed view on the other, or combine both screens into a single tall page view. It was released in Japan and Europe in 2006 and in North America in 2007. Operation requires the included memory expansion pak in the Game Boy Advance slot.

==== Wi-Fi USB Connector ====
This accessory connects to a PC's USB port and creates a small wireless access point in homes without Wi-Fi, allowing a Wii and up to five Nintendo DS systems to connect to the Nintendo Wi-Fi Connection service through the host computer's Internet connection. The Wi-Fi USB Connector was eventually discontinued, and the Nintendo Wi-Fi Connection service ended in 2014.

==== Guitar grip controller ====
The Guitar Grip controller, bundled with Guitar Hero: On Tour, plugs into the GBA slot and features four buttons similar to those on full-size Guitar Hero controllers. It includes a stylus shaped like a guitar pick and a hand strap, and ships with an adapter for the original Nintendo DS. The Guitar Grip is also compatible with Guitar Hero On Tour: Decades, Guitar Hero On Tour: Modern Hits, and Band Hero.

== Software and features ==
=== Nintendo Wi-Fi Connection ===
Nintendo Wi-Fi Connection was a free online game service run by Nintendo. Players with a compatible Nintendo DS game could connect to the service via a Wi-Fi network using a Nintendo Wi-Fi USB Connector or a wireless router. The service was launched in North America, Australia, Japan and Europe throughout November 2005. An online compatible Nintendo DS game was released on the same day for each region.

Nintendo WFC Service launch date by region
Region	Launch date	Compatible launch title	Ref.
North America	November 14, 2005	Mario Kart DS	
Australia	November 17, 2005	Mario Kart DS	
Japan	November 23, 2005	Animal Crossing: Wild World	
Europe	November 25, 2005	Mario Kart DS	

Additional Nintendo DS Wi-Fi Connection games and a dedicated Nintendo DS web browser were released afterwards. Nintendo later believed that the online platform's success directly propelled the commercial success of the entire Nintendo DS platform. The Nintendo Wi-Fi Connection served as part of the basis of what would become the Wii. Most functions (for games on both the DS and Wii consoles) were discontinued worldwide on May 20, 2014.

=== Download Play ===
With Download Play, it is possible for users to play multiplayer games with other Nintendo DS systems, and later Nintendo 3DS systems, using only one game card. Players must have their systems within wireless range (up to approximately 65 feet) of each other for the guest system to download the necessary data from the host system. Only certain games supported this feature and usually played with much more limited features than the full game allowed.

Download Play is also utilized to migrate Pokémon from fourth generation games into the fifth generation Pokémon Black and White, an example of a task requiring two different game cards and two handheld units, but only one player.

Some Nintendo DS retailers featured DS Download Stations that allowed users to download demos of current and upcoming DS games; however, due to memory limitations, the downloads were erased once the system was powered off. The Download Station was made up of 1 to 8 standard retail DS units, with a standard DS card containing the demo data. On May 7, 2008, Nintendo released the Nintendo Channel for download on the Wii. The Nintendo Channel used WiiConnect24 to download Nintendo DS demos through it. From there, a user can select the demo they wish to play and, similar to the Nintendo DS Download Stations at retail outlets, download it to their DS and play it until it is powered off.

=== Multi-Card Play ===
Multi-Card Play, like Download Play, allows users to play multiplayer games with other Nintendo DS systems. In this case, each system requires a game card. This mode is accessed from an in-game menu, rather than the normal DS menu.

=== PictoChat ===
PictoChat allows users to communicate with other Nintendo DS users within local wireless range. Users can enter text (via an on-screen keyboard), handwrite messages or draw pictures (via the stylus and touchscreen). There are four chatrooms (A, B, C, D) in which people can go to chat. Up to sixteen people can connect in any one room.

PictoChat was not available for the subsequent Nintendo 3DS series of systems.

=== Firmware ===
Nintendo's own firmware boots the system. A health and safety warning is displayed first, then the main menu is loaded. The main menu presents the player with four main options to select: play a DS game, use PictoChat, initiate DS Download Play, or play a Game Boy Advance game. The main menu also has secondary options such as turning on or off the backlight, the system settings, and an alarm.

The firmware also features a clock, several options for customization (such as boot priority for when games are inserted and GBA screen preferences), and the ability to input user information and preferences (such as name, birthday, favorite color, etc.) that can be used in games.

Japanese, American, and European consoles support the following languages: English, Japanese, Spanish, French, German, and Italian.

On consoles from mainland China, Chinese replaces Japanese, and on Korean consoles, Italian is replaced by Korean.

== Games ==
=== Compatibility ===
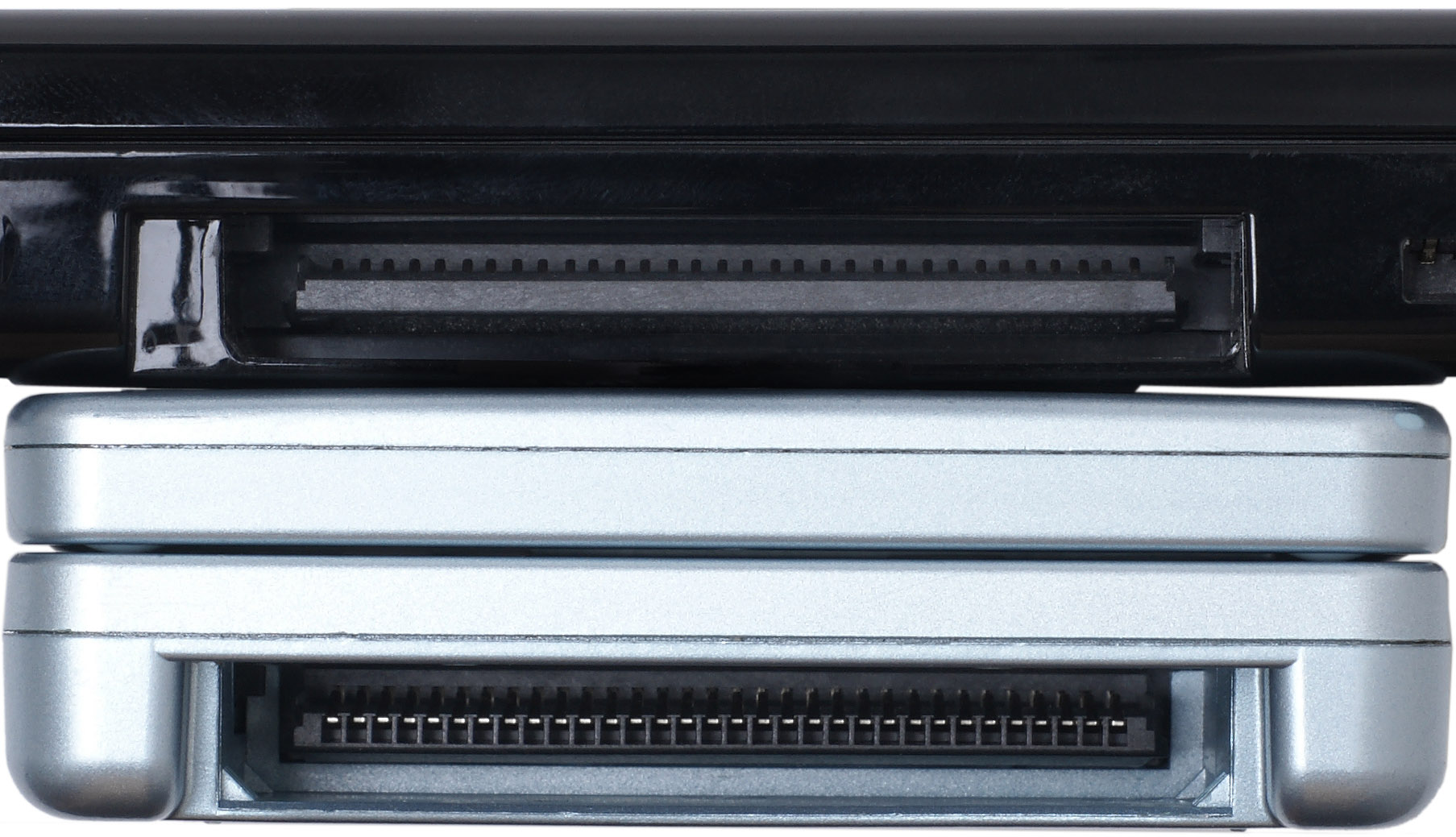
Game Boy Advance game slot on Game Boy Advance SP (below) and Nintendo DS Lite (above)

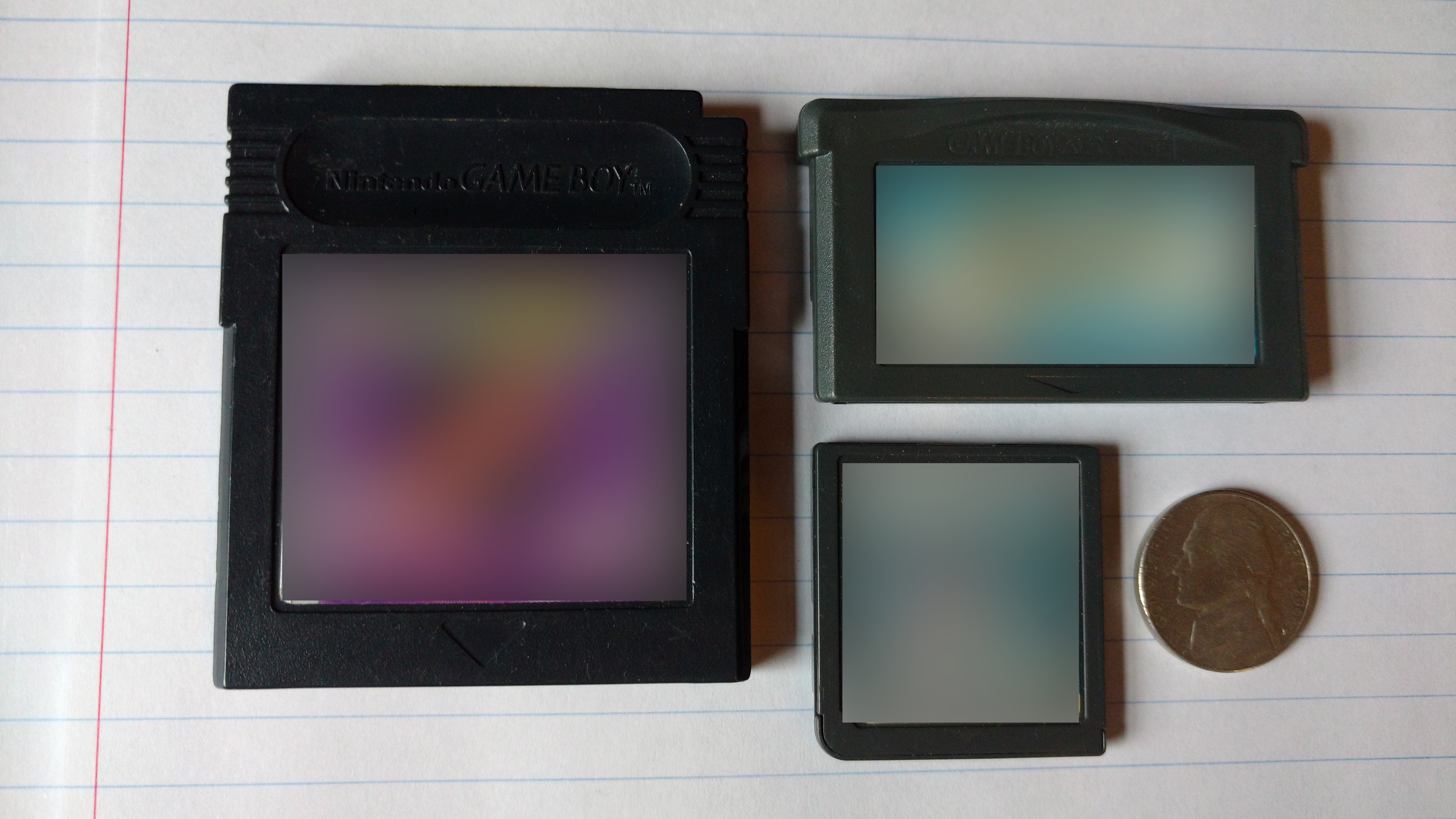
Clockwise from left: A Game Boy game cartridge, a Game Boy Advance game cartridge, and a Nintendo DS game cartridge. On the far right is a United States Nickel shown for scale.

The Nintendo DS is backward compatible with Game Boy Advance (GBA) cartridges. The smaller Nintendo DS game cards fit into a slot on the top of the system, while Game Boy Advance games fit into a slot on the bottom. The Nintendo DS, like the Game Boy Micro, is not backward compatible with games made for the original Game Boy and Game Boy Color because the required hardware is not included and the console has physical incompatibility with Game Boy and Game Boy Color games.

The handheld does not have a port for the Game Boy Advance Link Cable, so multiplayer and GameCube–Game Boy Advance link-up modes are not available in Game Boy Advance titles. Only single-player mode is supported on the Nintendo DS, as is the case with Game Boy Advance games played via the Virtual Console on the Nintendo 3DS (Ambassadors only) and Wii U.

The Nintendo DS only uses one screen when playing Game Boy Advance games. The user can configure the system to use either the top or bottom screen by default. The games are displayed within a black border on the screen, due to the slightly different screen resolution between the two systems (256 × 192 px for the Nintendo DS, and 240 × 160 px for the Game Boy Advance).

Nintendo DS games inserted into the top slot are able to detect the presence of specific Game Boy Advance games in the bottom slot. In many such games, either stated in-game during gameplay or explained in its instruction manual, extra content can be unlocked or added by starting the Nintendo DS game with the appropriate Game Boy Advance game inserted. Among those games were the popular Pokémon Diamond and Pearl or Pokémon Platinum, which allowed the player to find more/exclusive Pokémon in the wild if a suitable Game Boy Advance cartridge was inserted. Some of the content can stay permanently, even after the GBA game has been removed.

Additionally, the GBA slot can be used to house expansion paks, such as the Rumble Pak, Nintendo DS Memory Expansion Pak, and Guitar Grips for the Guitar Hero: On Tour series. The Nintendo DSi and the DSi XL have an SD card slot instead of a second cartridge slot and cannot play Game Boy Advance games or Guitar Hero: On Tour. In certain Wii games such as Band Hero, the player can use a Nintendo DS for additional features.

=== Regional division ===
The Nintendo DS is region free in the sense that any console will run a Nintendo DS game purchased anywhere in the world; however, the Chinese iQue DS games cannot be played on other versions of the original DS, whose firmware chip does not contain the required Chinese character glyph images; this restriction is removed on Nintendo DSi and 3DS systems. Although the Nintendo DS of other regions cannot play the Chinese games, the iQue DS can play games of other regions. Also, as with Game Boy games, some games that require both players to have a Nintendo DS game card for multiplayer play will not necessarily work together if the games are from different regions (e.g. a Japanese Nintendo DS game may not work with a North American copy, even though some titles, such as Mario Kart DS are mutually compatible). With the addition of the Nintendo Wi-Fi Connection, certain games can be played over the Internet with users of a different region game.

Some Wi-Fi enabled games (e.g. Mario Kart DS) allow the selection of opponents by region. The options are "Regional" ("Continent" in Europe) and "Worldwide", as well as two non-location-specific settings. This allows the player to limit competitors to only those opponents based in the same geographical area. This is based on the region code of the game in use.

=== Media specifications ===
Nintendo DS games use a proprietary solid state mask ROM in their game cards. The mask ROM chips are manufactured by Macronix and have an access time of 150 ns. Cards range from 8 to 512 MiB (64 Mibit to 4 Gibit) in size (although data on the maximum capacity has not been released). Larger cards have a 25% slower data transfer rate than more common smaller cards. The cards usually have a small amount of flash memory or an EEPROM to save user data such as game progress or high scores. The game cards are 35 mm × 33 mm × 3.8 mm (1.38 in × 1.30 in × 0.15 in) (about half the width and depth of Game Boy Advance cartridges) and weigh around 3.5 g (1/8 oz).

== Hacking and homebrew ==
The R4 cartridge (also known as Revolution for DS) is a popular flash cartridge for the Nintendo DS. It allows ROMs and homebrew games to be booted on the DS from a microSD card.

In South Korea, many video game consumers exploit illegal copies of video games, including those compatible with the DS. In 2007, over 500,000 copies of DS games were sold, while the sales of the DS hardware units was 800,000.

Another modification device called Action Replay, manufactured by the company Datel, is a device which allows the user to input cheat codes that allows it to hack games, granting the player infinite health, power-ups, access to any part of the game, infinite in game currency, the ability to walk through walls, and various other abilities depending on the game and code used.
