= Strider =

Strider may refer to:

== Literature ==
- Strider, standard English title of Leo Tolstoy's novella Kholstomer
- Strider (novel), a juvenile fiction novel by Beverly Cleary
- Strider, an alias of Aragorn, a character from The Lord of the Rings by J.R.R. Tolkien
- Strider, a giant mecha (walking vehicle) in Stanisław Lem's 1987 novel Fiasco
- Dave and Dirk Strider, fictional characters from the webcomic Homestuck

== Manga and video games ==
- Strider Hiryu, a manga and video game character who has starred in the following titles:
  - Strider (1988 manga), a 1988 manga by Moto Kikaku
  - Strider (1989 arcade game), an action game
  - Strider (1989 NES video game), a different game starring the same character
  - Strider II (1990 video game), sequel to the arcade game
  - Strider 2 (1999 video game), sequel to the arcade game
  - Strider (2014 video game), a game in the series
- Strider, a type of Combine machine/bio-engineered creature from the Half-Life video game universe
- Strider, an agility-based vocation in the Dragon's Dogma video games
- Strider Squadron, the player's fighter squadron in Ace Combat 7: Skies Unknown
- Strider, a mob found in the nether dimension in Minecraft

== People ==
- Burns Strider (born 1966), American consultant, lobbyist and former political aide
- Marjorie Strider (1931–2014), American painter and sculptor performance
- Spencer Strider (born 1998), American baseball pitcher
- Tinchy Stryder (born 1986), Ghanaian-British rapper and singer-songwriter

== Other uses ==
- Strider Wildlife Management Area, in Maryland
- Strider Farm, West Virginia, a site of frequent fighting during the American Civil War
- Strider Knives, a knife production company
  - Strider SMF, a knife developed by the company for the U.S. Marine Corps
- Alexander Strider, a bus manufactured by Walter Alexander Coachbuilders

== See also ==
- Water strider, a member of the insect family Gerridae
- Stridor, the sound made by someone with a breathing difficulty
- "Bron-Y-Aur Stomp", a Led Zeppelin song with lyrics about a dog named Strider
