= Strider (2014 video game) =

- Developers: Double Helix Games; Capcom Osaka Studio
- Publisher: Capcom
- Directors: Tony Barnes; Koji Oda
- Producers: Jorge Oseguera; Andrew Szymanski; James Vance
- Designers: Daniel Jacbos; Brian Smith; Paul Silva; Tony Barnes
- Artists: Sho Sakai; Jon Tucci
- Writer: Tony Barnes
- Composer: Michael John Mollo
- Platforms: PlayStation 3 PlayStation 4 Windows; Xbox 360; Xbox One
- Release: PlayStation 3, PlayStation 4: NA: February 18, 2014; PAL: February 19, 2014; JP: February 22, 2014; Windows: NA: February 19, 2014; PAL: February 19, 2014; Xbox 360: NA: February 19, 2014; PAL: February 19, 2014; JP: February 26, 2014; Xbox One: NA: February 19, 2014; PAL: February 19, 2014; JP: September 4, 2014
- Genres: Hack and slash, Metroidvania
- Mode: Single-player

Strider, known in Japan as Strider Hiryū (ストライダー飛竜, Sutoraidā Hiryū), is a 2014 hack and slash game developed by Double Helix Games and Capcom's Osaka studio. It was released in February 2014 for PlayStation 3, PlayStation 4, Windows, Xbox 360, and Xbox One. It is a reboot of the 1989 video game Strider.

== Gameplay ==
The player controls the series' main character, Strider Hiryu. The environment is freely explorable in search for weapons and items. Strider Hiryu's main weapon is his Cypher, a plasma weapon that can take several properties. Upgrades for the Cypher can be obtained by exploring Kazakh.

== Plot ==
The Strider organization sends their best assassin, Hiryu, to kill the villain, Grandmaster Meio, in the metropolis of Kazakh City.

The game is a retelling of the "core Strider story" and its common theme which centers around Hiryu's battle against Grandmaster Meio. The game mixes together elements from the first arcade Strider game, the NES console game, Strider 2, his Marvel vs. Capcom fighting game appearances, and the original manga from Moto Kikaku.

== Development ==
In 2009, a Strider reboot was in development by Grin. However, due to financial difficulties that bankrupted the company, the game was cancelled.

Development of the 2014 game was made possible thanks to the series' popularity especially in thanks to Capcom's surveys and forums. Strider was announced by Capcom in July 2013 during San Diego Comic-Con. Capcom found Double Helix could work well with their Osaka studio which handled the character designs and game design. Producers from the game commented they wanted to make the classic Strider games less linear and expand their length to satisfy current generation's players. Due to the character's popularity, developers want him to retain all of his abilities from the first and second Strider games but at the same time encourage the players to obtain new skills in order to progress and provide more variety. This was how the team had the idea of giving Cypher the power to change forms. Additionally, the team wanted to contrast other games that start with the character completely powered up just to remove most of his skills in the game's beginning.

Kouichi Yotsui, also known as "Isuke" and original designer of the first arcade version of Strider, was not involved in the development of the 2014 game but gave his blessing by giving his prayers to Capcom USA. One of the staff's main influences is the video game Shadow Complex as producer Andrew Szymanski wanted Strider to imitate the game's balance between combat, speed and exploration. The action in the reboot is eight times faster than the original game, making this balance one of the staff's greatest challenges. Hiryu's appearances in the Marvel vs. Capcom series also influenced the character's gameplay mechanics.

The game's soundtrack features multiple homages to classic Strider themes but with several modifications. The sound quality is also meant to resemble the music from the original games.

== Reception ==
Reception

Aggregate score
| Aggregator | Score | | | | |
| Aggregator | PC | PS3 | PS4 | Xbox 360 | Xbox One |
|---|---|---|---|---|---|
| Metacritic | 78/100 | 70/100 | 77/100 | 76/100 | 76/100 |

Review scores
| Publication | Score | | | | |
| Publication | PC | PS3 | PS4 | Xbox 360 | Xbox One |
|---|---|---|---|---|---|
| Destructoid | N/A | N/A | N/A | N/A | 9.5/10 |
| Electronic Gaming Monthly | N/A | N/A | N/A | N/A | 8/10 |
| Eurogamer | N/A | N/A | N/A | N/A | 7/10 |
| Game Informer | 8.75/10 | N/A | 8.75/10 | N/A | 8.75/10 |
| GameRevolution | N/A | N/A | 3.5/5 | N/A | N/A |
| GameSpot | N/A | N/A | 8/10 | N/A | 8/10 |
| GameTrailers | N/A | N/A | 6.4/10 | N/A | N/A |
| Giant Bomb | N/A | N/A | 3/5 | N/A | 3/5 |
| IGN | 7.5/10 | 7.5/10 | 7.5/10 | 7.5/10 | 7.5/10 |
| Joystiq | N/A | N/A | N/A | N/A | 4/5 |
| PlayStation Official Magazine – UK | N/A | N/A | 9/10 | N/A | N/A |
| Official Xbox Magazine (US) | N/A | N/A | N/A | N/A | 8/10 |
| PC Gamer (UK) | 70% | N/A | N/A | N/A | N/A |
| Polygon | N/A | N/A | N/A | N/A | 8.5/10 |
| Digital Spy | N/A | N/A | 4/5 | N/A | N/A |
| Slant Magazine | N/A | N/A | 4/5 | N/A | N/A |

Strider received "generally favorable reviews" on all platforms except the PlayStation 3 version, which received "average" reviews, according to the review aggregation website Metacritic.

Adam Beck of Hardcore Gamer said of the PlayStation 4 version, "Double Helix has done a phenomenal job in bringing the futuristic ninja into the modern day by not only upgrading the visuals while maintaining the two-dimension plane, but adding an addictive and well-constructed progression structure to keep the campaign interesting." In Japan, Famitsu gave the PS3 and PS4 versions each a score of one nine, two eights, and one nine for a total of 34 out of 40.

411Mania gave the PS3 version a score of 8.2 out of 10 and said it was "a nice update of the franchise for the modern era. It's far from a groundbreaking game, but as a $15 downloadable title, it's fun throwback to traditional action games of the 1980s and 90s." The Escapist gave the Xbox One version four stars out of five and called it "a stellar example of how to remake a classic. It sticks to the original where it should, and modernizes where the classic formula can be improved." GameZone gave the game a score of eight out of ten and said that it's "out on so many different consoles, so there's no excuse not to give it a try. At 4-6 hours of gameplay your first run, plus all the challenge modes, the $14.99 price tag is very reasonable. The game can definitely feel repetitive but you can always mix up your play style, and there's plenty of room for variety." Slant Magazine gave the PS4 version four stars out of five and said, "The less resilient player can and will die more than they have in quite some time; the good ones will be just as excited going back for more after the hundredth Game Over as they were at the first." The Digital Fix similarly gave the same console version eight out of ten and said it was "a game that will succeed on its own merits and not by comparison to the original." Digital Spy gave it a similar score of four stars out of five and said it was "admirably true to the game that Capcom released on arcades in 1989 and will delight those who still hold a candle for the original, with its unaltered core gameplay and polished production values. With these qualities on side, it's easy to overlook the game's shortcomings and deem it worthy of the Strider name." National Post likewise gave it a score of eight out of ten and called it "a great meaty throwback worth the $15 offer price." Metro, however, gave it a score of seven out of ten and said, "The mixture of old school, new school, and Metroidvania works surprisingly well – even if Strider's long-awaited reboot still feels slightly too safe." Edge gave the Xbox 360 version a similar score of seven out of ten and called it "a sensitive update for a series many thought would stay stuck in the past."

The game reached #5 in the European sales charts, and #1 in the United States.

=== Sales ===
As of June 30, 2023, Strider has sold 1.40 million units worldwide, becoming one of Capcom's Platinum Titles.
