= List of best-selling fiction authors =

Best selling fiction authors to date in any language

This is a list of best-selling fiction authors to date, in any language. While finding precise sales numbers for any given author is nearly impossible, the list is based on approximate numbers provided or repeated by reliable sources. Numbers given are estimated copies sold of all fiction books written or co-written by an author. To keep the list manageable, only authors with estimated sales of at least 100 million are included. Authors of comic books are not included unless they have been published in book format (for example, comic albums, manga tankōbon volumes, trade paperbacks, or graphic novels).

Some authors, including Jane Austen, Miguel de Cervantes, Alexandre Dumas, Charles Dickens, Arthur Conan Doyle, Victor Hugo, Jules Verne, Ernest Hemingway, Jack Higgins, Isaac Asimov and Leon Uris have not been included in the table because no exact figures could be found, although it is possible that they too have more than 100 million copies of their work in print.

== List ==
Estimates come from different years and are therefore not directly comparable.

Author	Min. estimated sales	Max. estimated sales	Original language	Genre and/or major works	Number of books	Nationality
William Shakespeare	2 billion	4 billion	English	Plays and poetry, e.g. Romeo and Juliet, Macbeth, and Hamlet	42	English
Agatha Christie	2 billion	4 billion	English	Whodunits, including the Miss Marple and Hercule Poirot series	86	British
Barbara Cartland	500 million	1 billion	English	Romance	723	British
Danielle Steel	500 million	800 million	English	General fiction, romance	179	American
Harold Robbins	50 million	750 million	English	Adventure	23	American
Georges Simenon	500 million	700 million	French	Detectives, Maigret, romans durs	570	Belgian
J. K. Rowling	600 million	600 million	English	Young adult fiction, Harry Potter among other works	22	British
Eiichiro Oda	600 million	600 million	Japanese	Manga, One Piece	117	Japanese
Enid Blyton	400 million	600 million	English	Children's literature, Noddy, The Famous Five, The Secret Seven	800	British
Jackie Collins	400 million	500 million	English	Romance	32	British
Sidney Sheldon	300 million	500 million	English	Suspense	21	American
Rick Riordan	190 million		English	Fantasy	30+	American
Gilbert Patten	125 million	500 million	English	Adolescent adventures	209	American
Dr. Seuss	100 million	500 million	English	Children's literature	44	American
Akira Toriyama	298 million (Note: Tankōbon book sales of Akira Toriyama's manga: Dr. Slump – 35 million copies (Japan); Dragon Ball – 260 million+ official copies (worldwide), to 400 million+ official and unofficial copies. (Note: See Dragon Ball (manga) § Reception); Dragon Ball Super – 3,289,401 copies (Japan) (Note: See Dragon Ball Super § Manga reception))	438 million	Japanese	Manga, Dr. Slump, Dragon Ball, Dragon Ball Super	66	Japanese
Leo Tolstoy	413 million	413 million	Russian	War and Peace, Anna Karenina	48	Russian
Corín Tellado	400 million	400 million	Spanish	Romance	4,000	Spanish
James Patterson	400 million	400 million	English	Thriller, Alex Cross, Maximum Ride	400+	American
Dean Koontz	500 million	500 million	English	Horror, thriller, science fiction, fantasy	91	American
Stephen King	300 million	400 million	English	Horror, science fiction, fantasy, It, The Shining, The Stand, Pet Sematary, Salem's Lot, The Green Mile	77	American
Horatio Alger	200 million	400 million	English	Dime novels	135	American
Nora Roberts	145 million	400 million	English	Romance	200+	American
R. L. Stine	100 million	400 million	English	Goosebumps series, Fear Street series, horror, comedy	430+	American
Alexander Pushkin	357 million	357 million	Russian	Plays, poetry, prose, Eugene Onegin	17	Russian
Paulo Coelho	225 million	350 million	Portuguese	The Alchemist	28	Brazilian
Jirō Akagawa	300 million	330 million	Japanese	Mystery	500+	Japanese
Jeffrey Archer	250 million	330 million	English	Saga, thriller, short stories, Kane and Abel, The Clifton Chronicles	33	British
Louis L'Amour	230 million	330 million	English	Western	101	American
René Goscinny	325 million	325 million	French	Franco-Belgian comics, Asterix, Lucky Luke, Iznogoud	108	French
Erle Stanley Gardner	100 million	325 million	English	Mystery, Perry Mason	140	American
Edgar Wallace	300 million	300 million	English	Detective	175	British
Janet Dailey	300 million	300 million	English	Romance	93	American
Jin Yong	100 million	300 million	Chinese	Wuxia	15	Chinese
Robert Ludlum	110 million	290 million	English	Espionage, Jason Bourne	40	American
Takehiko Inoue	283 million	283 million	Japanese	Slam Dunk, Vagabond, Real	85	Japanese
Osamu Tezuka	276 million	276 million	Japanese	Manga, Astro Boy, Black Jack, Buddha	62	Japanese
Frédéric Dard	200 million	270 million	French	Detective, San Antonio	300	French
Stan and Jan Berenstain	200 million	260 million	English	Berenstain Bears	300+	American
Roald Dahl	200 million	250 million	English	Children's literature	50	British
Zane Grey	250 million	250 million	English	Western		American
Irving Wallace	250 million	250 million	English	Suspense		American
Masashi Kishimoto	250 million	250 million	Japanese	Manga, Naruto	72	Japanese
Gosho Aoyama	250 million	250 million	Japanese	Manga, Detective Conan	107	Japanese
J. R. R. Tolkien	200 million	250 million	English	The Lord of the Rings, The Hobbit, classical fantasy	36	British
John Grisham	100 million	250 million	English	Legal thriller	35	American
Karl May	100 million	200 million	German	Western, adventure	80	German
Mickey Spillane	100 million	200 million	English	Detective, Mike Hammer		American
C. S. Lewis	100 million	200 million	English	The Chronicles of Narnia, fantasy, popular theology	38	British
Kyotaro Nishimura		200 million	Japanese	Mystery	400+	Japanese
Mitsuru Adachi		200 million	Japanese	Manga, Touch, H2, Slow Step, Miyuki, Cross Game		Japanese
Rumiko Takahashi		200 million	Japanese	Manga, Urusei Yatsura, Ranma ½, Inuyasha, Maison Ikkoku		Japanese
Dan Brown	200 million	200 million	English	Thriller, Robert Langdon	7	American
Alistair MacLean	150 million	200 million	English	Adventure, thriller, war stories	32	British
Ann M. Martin	172 million	180 million	English	The Baby-sitters Club	335	American
Ryōtarō Shiba		180 million	Japanese	Historical	350	Japanese
Arthur Hailey	150 million	170 million	English	Thriller	11	British/Canadian
Keigo Higashino	168 million	168 million	Japanese	Mystery	106	Japanese
Astrid Lindgren	100 million	165 million	Swedish	Children's literature	100	Swedish
Koyoharu Gotouge	150 million	150 million	Japanese	Manga, Demon Slayer: Kimetsu no Yaiba	23	Japanese
Anne Rice	150 million	150 million+	English	Gothic fiction, vampires, Interview with the Vampire (The Vampire Chronicles) The Witching Hour (Lives of the Mayfair Witches)	40	American
Gérard de Villiers		150 million	French	Detectives, SAS	170	French
Beatrix Potter	100 million	250 million	English	Peter Rabbit	23	British
Michael Crichton	150 million	150 million	English	Techno thriller	25	American
Richard Scarry	100 million	150 million	English	Illustrated children's books	300+	American
Clive Cussler	40 million	150 million	English	Adventure, Dirk Pitt	37	American
Ken Follett	90 million	150 million	English	Spy thriller, historical thriller	30	British
Debbie Macomber	60 million	140 million	English	Romance		American
Naoki Urasawa		140 million	Japanese	Manga		Japanese
Hiroshi Motomiya		130 million	Japanese	Manga, including Tenchi wo Kurau and Salary Man Kintaro		Japanese
E.L. James	100 million	125 million	English	Fifty Shades of Grey	7	British
Carter Brown	100 million	120 million	English	Detective		Australian
Tite Kubo	120 million		Japanese	Manga, Bleach	74	Japanese
Eiji Yoshikawa		120 million	Japanese	Musashi	7	Japanese
Hajime Isayama	120 million	120 million	Japanese	Manga, Attack on Titan	34	Japanese
Catherine Cookson	100 million	120 million	English	Romance	103	British
Stephenie Meyer	100 million	116 million	English	The Twilight Saga, The Host, romance	6	American
Norman Bridwell	100 million	110 million	English	Clifford the Big Red Dog	80	American
David Baldacci		110 million	English	Thriller	25	American
Nicholas Sparks	90 million	105 million	English	Romance	22	American
Hirohiko Araki	120 million	120 million	Japanese	Manga, JoJo's Bizarre Adventure	131	Japanese
Tom Clancy	100 million	100 million	English	Espionage, Thriller, Jack Ryan	19	American
Andrew Neiderman	100 million	100 million	English	V. C. Andrews, The Devil's Advocate	60	American
Evan Hunter	100 million	100 million	English	Detective (Ed McBain)	94	American
Roger Hargreaves	100 million	100 million	English	Children's literature, Mr. Men		British
Robin Cook	100 million	100 million	English	Medical thriller Coma	27	American
Wilbur Smith	80 million	100 million	English	African adventure	32	South African/British
Erskine Caldwell	80 million	100 million	English	Literature	25	American
Judith Krantz	80 million	100 million	English	Romance	12	American
Eleanor Hibbert	100 million	100 million	English	Romance, historical, suspense	200	British
Lewis Carroll		100 million	English	Alice's Adventures in Wonderland, nonsense literature	5	British
Denise Robins		100 million	English	Romance	200	British
Cao Xueqin		100 million	Chinese	Dream of the Red Chamber		Chinese
Ian Fleming	100 million	100 million	English	James Bond	14	British
Hermann Hesse	100 million	100 million	German	Steppenwolf, Siddhartha, The Glass Bead Game	45	German-Swiss
Rex Stout	100 million	100 million	English	Nero Wolfe	50	American
Anne Golon	100 million	100 million	French	Angélique	14	French
Frank G. Slaughter		100 million	English	Medical	62	American
Edgar Rice Burroughs	100 million	100 million	English	Tarzan, Barsoom and Pellucidar series, science fantasy		American
John Creasey		100 million	English	Crime thriller	600	British
James A. Michener		100 million	English	Historical	47	American
Yasuo Uchida	100 million		Japanese	Mystery	130+	Japanese
Seiichi Morimura		100 million	Japanese	Mystery	350+	Japanese
Mary Higgins Clark	100 million	100 million	English	Thriller		American
Penny Jordan	90 million	100 million	English	Romance	200+	British
Patricia Cornwell		100 million	English	Thriller, Kay Scarpetta series	34+	American

== See also ==
- List of best-selling books
- List of best-selling novels in the United States
- List of best-selling manga
