= DOAE =

DOAE may refer to:

- Destiny of an Emperor, 1989 video game
- Defence Operational Analysis Establishment, part of the UK Ministry of Defence 1965–95; see CORDA (UK)
- Department of Agricultural Extension, a department within Thailand's Ministry of Agriculture and Cooperatives

== See also ==
- Destiny of an Emperor II, 1991 sequel to Destiny of an Emperor
