= Tenchi wo Kurau II =

Tenchi wo Kurau II may refer to:

- Tenchi wo Kurau II: Shokatsu Kōmei Den, a 1991 role-playing video game
- Tenchi wo Kurau 2: Sekiheki no Tatakai, a 1992 beat-'em-up video game released outside Japan as Warriors of Fate
