= Osman (video game) =

1996 video game

- Developer: Mitchell Corporation
- Publisher: Mitchell Corporation: JP: Atlus
- Designer: Kouichi Yotsui (Isuke)
- Platforms: Arcade; Nintendo Switch; PlayStation 4 PlayStation 5 Xbox One; Xbox Series X and Series S
- Release: Arcade; 1996; Nintendo Switch, PS4, PS5, Xbox One, Xbox Series X and Series S April 13, 2023
- Genres: Platform, beat 'em up
- Mode: Single-player

Osman (also known as Cannon-Dancer (Note: Also known as Cannon-Dancer (Japanese: キャノンダンサー, Hepburn: Kyanondansā) in Japan.)) is a side-scrolling action platform game developed by Mitchell Corporation and released as a coin-operated arcade game in 1996. Many ex-Capcom staff including Kouichi Yotsui (credited as Isuke) have worked on the original arcade version of Strider and designed its sequel, Osman. Yotsui directed both titles.

In contrast to Strider's futuristic Kazakh-Soviet setting, Osman has a neon-lit cyberpunk Arabian setting, while Strider Hiryu is replaced by a Chinese protagonist named Osman (Kirin) who fights without any weapons. 1UP.com included the game in its "Games to Play Before You Die" list. The game's bizarre plot supposedly mocks director Kouichi Yotsui's experience at Capcom after Strider.

== Gameplay ==
Gameplay screenshot showcasing Gamran, the first boss of the game.

The controls of Osman consist of an eight-way joystick for moving the character, and three action buttons for attacking, jumping, and activating a special attack which will destroy all on-screen enemies (which has only a limited number of uses and cannot be fully replenished until the player loses a life). The player can also climb walls and ceilings as well. The player character attacks primarily with his powerful kicks, which can fatally slice through most of the enemy soldiers in the face. Pressing down and jump will cause to slide. While sliding, the player character can do a slide kick with the attack button or grab certain enemies and flip them over with the jump button. The player can also dash by holding the joystick left or right after sliding.

There are four types of power-up capsules that the player can retrieve by destroying certain floating containers. The red capsules will increase the player character's attack power by allowing him to create body images of himself that will mimic his movement. The main character's attack power can be determined by the color of his pants. In his starting level, the character's pants will be blue, which changed to purple with the first power-up (allowing him to create one body image), followed by red (two body images) and white (four body images). The strongest attack level is black, which increases the player character's attack range. If the player takes damage from an enemy Osman's attack power will be reduced by one level. Other power-up items include a green power-up that restores one health point, a yellow power-up that increases the maximum health by one point, and a blue power-up that restores the player's complete health.

== Osman (Kirin) ==
Kirin (麒麟＜キリン＞, originally planned to be Killing, and then called Osman in the English script) is an elite fighter of Teki, a mercenary unit whose members boast incredible physical prowess and skill, training their physique until they can be called "weapons". Among them Osman stands as a top-class fighter expert in hand-to-hand combat, having succeeded a secret style of martial arts, and as such he holds the title of the strongest Teki. Silent and stoic, Osman is a person of little words but strong determination, stopping at nothing to accomplish his goal. He also appears to have a strong sense of loyalty, and when betrayed he reveals a violent and vengeful side.

== Story ==
Osman is set in a dystopian late-21st century in which Earth is under control of a single federal government. One day, a new threat known as "Abdullah the Slaver" – an evil sorceress who wants to take control of the world – appears, causing widespread terror and panic. This fear incites the abandonment of all economic activity and corruption in the government, which now undermines the foundations of society itself. Judicial Affairs Director, Jack Layzon, fears the worst and summons a lone assassin.

The player controls a Cannon Dancer called Osman (Kirin), a top-class agent in a mercenary unit known as "Teki", and a highly skilled martial arts fighter. As he travels toward the Federal Capital in Prague, he has to face not only Abdullah the Slaver and the government forces but also the other members of the Teki, who want him dead for personal reasons. Osman is hired by the Federal Attorney general Jack Layzon to reclaim one of his cities from a terrorist-leaning cult named Slaver, who worships a "God without form". Osman infiltrates the city in the midst of the night and makes his way into the cult's main temple at its center. Once inside, however, Layzon suddenly appears with a huge police force and, using all the disturbance caused by the conflict as a legal excuse, has the cultists arrested. Having no further use for Osman, Layzon betrays him via the police force suddenly attacking Osman without warning and leaves him to die in a scorching desert chained to a large rock formation.

Osman, however, manages to survive by using his inner strength to break free from his chains and starts moving with a single goal in mind: getting revenge against Layzon. As he travels toward the Federal Capital in Prague, he has to face not only the government forces, but also the three members of the Teki. Osman also attracts the attention of the goddess Slaver, who shows special interest in him and his quest for revenge for her own mysterious reasons. Traveling through a Federal mining complex under the desert, Osman discovers his former allies from Teki want to destroy him as well, and kills the first in battle. Osman then joins a band of prisoners as they leave the labor camp to cross the Indian Ocean. On their way, they are attacked by a Federal warship and Osman goes through it as it sinks into water. Left drifting on the ocean, he is suddenly assisted by the goddess Slaver, who recognizes his desire to kill and gives him her permission to kill freely. He also faces and kills the second member of Teki in this area. Upon reaching the mainland, Osman arrives at the Forest of Memory, a place infamous for its effect on people's memories and its ability to unlock vivid remembrances from the deepest parts of their minds. Here he faces the last surviving Teki, who reveals to Osman they have fought in the past and Osman was killed, goading him into choosing the memory of where it happened (in-game this is a choice between the previous three stages' boss rooms). Upon winning in the memory, this is revealed to be a false memory, a "scenario" the Teki fabricated in an attempt to kill Osman. With all enemies out of the way, Osman arrives at Prague and finally faces Layzon. At the last moment, his revenge is denied when Slaver appears and murders the traitor in front of him.

Slaver then calls to Osman, calling him her "beautiful murderous weapon" and referring to herself as Osman's "master", apparently believing he's now under her control. Osman's bloodthirst, however, grows stronger and he eventually targets Slaver herself. Slaver sends in several resurrected bosses, a clone of Osman and even all three Teki, but Osman kills them all again and reaches her on the Heliosphere. Slaver finally appears in front of Osman and challenges him to a duel to determine who is the stronger, with Earth standing as the prize. Slaver goes all out against Osman, but in the end, she's defeated. Slaver's control over Earth vanishes as the goddess' face cracks and a single tear rolls out of her eye, landing on an ill-looking Earth and reverting it to a healthier color. With her final breath, she asks Osman if he can't recognize who he is fighting against, proclaiming herself God, only for Osman to simply claim himself to be the "One God".

== Ports and Remasters ==
Roy Ozaki said in an interview that he wants to bring Osman to the consoles by looking for video game publishers willing to assist in publishing the game. ININ Games released Osman for Nintendo Switch, PlayStation 4, PlayStation 5, Xbox One and Xbox Series X and Series S in April 2023. The original game's director Kouichi Yotsui and artist Takashi Kogure were involved in the remaster's development.

== See also ==
- Run Saber
- Moon Diver
