= Dynasty Wars =

1989 video game

- Arcade flyer
- Developer: Capcom
- Publisher: Capcom
- Producer: Yoshiki Okamoto
- Designers: Noritaka Funamizu; S. Sato; Kenji Kataoka
- Programmers: Y Mutsunobu; M Kobayashi; Yuzo Tsunazaki
- Artists: Akemi Kurihara; Y Tamago; Mayumi Tanabe; M Matsuura; Shinji Sakashita; Sayuri Shintani
- Composer: Manami Matsumae
- Series: Tenchi wo Kurau
- Platforms: Arcade, ZX Spectrum, Commodore 64, Amstrad CPC, Amiga, Atari ST, PC Engine Super CD-ROM²
- Release: JP: April 19, 1989; WW: July 1989
- Genre: Beat 'em up
- Modes: Single-player, multiplayer
- Arcade system: CP System

Dynasty Wars, released in Japan as Tenchi wo Kurau, (Note: Japanese: 天地を喰らう; lit. The Devouring of Heaven and Earth) is a 1989 beat 'em up video game developed and published by Capcom for arcades. It is based on Hiroshi Motomiya's manga series Tenchi wo Kurau and a reenactment of the battle between the Kingdom of Shu and the Yellow Turban rebels. Each of the two players can assume the roles of one of the four Chinese generals riding on horseback from the Three Kingdoms period in an attempt to smash the rebellion. A sequel, Warriors of Fate, was released in 1992.

== Gameplay ==
The players' goal is to wipe out the Huang Ching, the organization responsible for the unrest of the Han dynasty and later defeat the tyrant Dong Zhuo, and up to two players can fight side by side to accomplish this goal. This game always scrolls to the right. Players must be able to survive the rebel hordes to reach and kill the rebel general in each stage to free the province.

Players can use three buttons: to attack left, attack right, or use special tactics. In the arcade version, inserting more coins and pressing START increases the maximum life of the player. Completing stages and an experience point system in the form yellow orbs allows the player to level-up, gaining more vitality and stronger weapons. These weapons are upgraded for every 3rd blue orb collected. In-game treasure increases player score, and food packs replenish vitality.

There are 4 selectable characters, each with their own varying amounts of attack power and initial vitality. Aside from unique weaponry, each character also has a unique partner character during a certain special attack. For every 3 blue orbs collected, the player's weapon improves, depending on his current level range.

There are a total of eight stages (called rounds), corresponding a province in reference to the historic battles in the novel.

== Conversions ==
Home computer versions for the ZX Spectrum, Amstrad CPC, Amiga, Atari ST and Commodore 64 were developed by Tiertex and published by U.S. Gold (or ERBE Software in Spain) in 1990.

NEC Avenue produced a PC Engine Super CD-ROM² version of Tenchi o Kurau, which was released exclusively in Japan in 1994. It adds an extensive intro and in-game cut scenes.

A version for the Capcom Power System Changer was planned and previewed but never released.

A completely different game based on the manga and made by Capcom was released on the NES as Destiny of an Emperor in North America.

== Reception ==
Reception

Review scores
Publication	Score
Crash	44% (ZX)
Your Sinclair	80% (ZX)

In Japan, Game Machine listed Dynasty Wars on their May 15, 1989, issue as being the second most-successful table arcade unit of the month, outperforming titles like Crack Down and Valkyrie no Densetsu.

The ZX Spectrum version was received with mixed reviews; Your Sinclair awarded it 80%, highlighting the detailed graphics and horse-mounted theme of combat. CRASH rated it only 44%, criticizing the monochrome graphics, juddering scrolling and dull gameplay.
