= Strider (1989 arcade game) =

1989 video game

- Arcade flyer
- Developer: Capcom: Capcom (arcade) Sega (Genesis) Tiertex Design Studios (Master System, computers)
- Publisher: Capcom: Capcom (arcade) Sega (Master System, Genesis) U.S. Gold (computers)
- Director: Kouichi Yotsui
- Designers: Kouichi Yotsui; Tokuro Fujiwara; Shinichi Yoshimoto
- Composer: Junko Tamiya
- Platform: Arcade: Mega Drive/Genesis, Master System, X68000, PC Engine CD, PlayStation, Amiga, Amstrad CPC, Atari ST, Commodore 64, MS-DOS, ZX Spectrum
- Release: January 1989: Arcade; EU: January 1989 (Note: Debuted at London's 1989 Amusement Trades Exhibition International (ATEI) show, held in January 1989); JP: March 7, 1989; NA: April 1989 Amiga, Atari ST; EU: August 1989 Amstrad CPC; EU: September 1989 PC; EU: October 1989 Mega Drive/Genesis; JP: September 29, 1990; NA: December 1990; EU: 1990 Master System; NA: June 1991; EU: September 1991 PC Engine CD; JP: September 22, 1994 PlayStation; JP: October 24, 2006
- Genres: Hack and slash, platform
- Modes: Single-player, multiplayer
- Arcade system: CP System

Strider, released in Japan as Strider Hiryū, (Note: Japanese: ストライダー飛竜, Hepburn: Sutoraidā Hiryū) is a 1989 hack and slash platform game developed and published by Capcom for arcades. Set in a dystopian future in which Earth is ruled by the tyrannical Grandmaster Meio, it follows the titular Strider named Hiryu as he attempts to end Meio's tyrannical reign for good. The game resulted from cooperation between Capcom and manga publisher Moto Kikaku. It marked the video game debut of Strider Hiryu, after the character was introduced in the 1988 manga Strider Hiryū.

The game debuted on Capcom's CP System arcade board. Various home computer ports were developed by Tiertex and published by U.S. Gold in 1989. The NES version has a different plot than the original. Sega released Strider for its own Genesis console in 1990. Of all home versions, the Genesis adaptation is considered the most successful, winning the Game of the Year and Best Graphics in a Video Game awards from Electronic Gaming Monthly in 1990.

Strider's gameplay is cited as a major influence on the video game franchises Ninja Gaiden, Devil May Cry, and God of War. It became one of Capcom's early hits, praised for its innovative gameplay, diverse and unique music, and multilingual voice samples.

== Gameplay ==
The Kazakh SSR stage

The controls of Strider consist of an eight-way joystick and two action buttons for attacking and jumping. The player controls the protagonist Strider Hiryu, a ninja whose main weapon is a tonfa-like plasma sword known as a "Cypher". He can perform numerous acrobatic feats depending on the joystick/button combination used. Pressing the jump button while Hiryu is standing still will cause him to do a regular vertical jump, while pressing the jump button while pushing the joystick left or right will enable him to do a cartwheel jump. Hiryu can also slide under or through certain obstacles and enemies by first crouching down and then pressing the jump button. As well as his sliding move, both jumps can also be used to destroy weaker opponents. Hiryu is able to latch onto certain platforms, and climb across walls and ceilings using a metallic hook. While running down a sloped surface, Hiryu can gain enough momentum to allow him to do a longer cartwheel jump than usual.

Numerous power-ups can be obtained from item boxes carried by certain enemies. These include an extension to Hiryu's attack range that lasts for one hundred slashes, two types of health aids (represented by the kanji used to write Hiryu's name: 飛 and 飛竜), a max health extension (represented by the kanji 竜, the second character in Hiryu's name), an extra life, and a power-up that not only makes Hiryu invulnerable to attack but also increases his own attack abilities via shadow images of himself for 15 seconds. Hiryu can also summon robotic companions known collectively as "options" that help him fight enemies. These consist of up to two mushroom-like droids, a saber-toothed robo tiger and a robot hawk, known individually as Options A, B, and C respectively.

The game has five stages: the Kazakh Soviet Socialist Republic (called "St. Petersburg" during the arcade game's attract sequence), the Siberian Wilderness, the Aerial Battleship Balrog, the Amazonian Jungle, and the Grandmaster's lair itself, the Third Moon. Each of the stages is divided into a number of smaller sections, each with their own time limit and checkpoint location. The player has a three-point health gauge (which can be increased to five points with the health extensions). Hiryu will lose a life when either his health gauge is fully depleted, by moving him off the screen entirely (like falling into a bottomless pit) or when the game's timer reaches zero. It is game over when all of Hiryu's lives are lost, but the player can be given the opportunity to continue.

== Plot ==
In a dystopian future in the year 2048, a mysterious dictator known as the "Grandmaster" rules the world. Hiryu, the youngest ever Super A Ranked member of an organization of high-tech ninja agents known as the "Striders", is alone tasked with the Grandmaster's assassination. Hiryu begins his mission by infiltrating the Grandmaster's capital at the Kazakh Soviet Socialist Republic, a Federation referred to as Eastern European which became the Imperial Capital of the Russian Empire by the year 2048.

== Development ==
The arcade version of Strider was part of a three-way project conceived in a collaboration between Capcom and Hiroshi Motomiya's manga studio Moto Kikaku, which also included the Strider Hiryu manga by Moto Kikaku's Tatsumi Wada that was published in Kodansha's Comic Computique anthology in Japan, as well as the NES version of Strider. Kouichi Yotsui, director of the coin-op Strider (who is credited as Isuke in the game), was chosen for his experience with the CP System hardware while working as a background designer on Ghouls 'n Ghosts. The three projects were developed independently of each other.

According to Yotsui the franchise was conceived as a multimedia collaboration between video game company Capcom and manga collective Moto Kikaku, the two companies having previously collaborated on the video game versions of the manga Tenchi wo Kurau. Moto Kikaku produced the manga version, while Capcom developed two separate video game versions, a coin-operated video game and a console version for the NES. All three works share common plot elements, while featuring their differences as well. He further said it was he who "pushed for a ninja concept" as they were leaning towards an action game, a ninja setting would've been convenient. "The hero would be derived from a ninja. We loosely decided on that." Regarding Hiryu's three robot helpers, he said that he was inspired by the 1960s ninja comics (the one that most influenced him was Shirato Sanpei's Kamui Gaiden), in which the ninja often had various animals to support them or attack their enemies. Speaking with Retro Gamer, Yotsui said that Strider Hiryu's climbing abilities were inspired by his personal experience when he got himself stranded on the roof of Capcom’s building; fearing freezing to death and with no way to call for help, he climbed down the side of the building to reach a nearby fire escape stairway.

The original arcade game soundtrack was composed entirely by video game music composer Junko Tamiya, who was not credited for her work in the arcade version but was mentioned as part of the original arcade staff in some console adaptations. Early revisions of the arcade game were missing the unique music for the Aerial Battleship and Third Moon stages. In this version the music from the first stage of the game was repeated here instead.

Strider contains many different styles of themes that change dynamically throughout the game according to the stages and the situations on screen. These range from experimental and progressive futuristic sci-fi action themes to baroque, tribal, and classical music pieces. Elements from the soundtrack have also been used in other Capcom games where Hiryu has appeared. These include the Marvel vs. Capcom series as well as other Strider related games.

== Ports ==
Ports of Strider for the Atari ST, Amstrad CPC, Amiga, Commodore 64, IBM PC compatibles, and ZX Spectrum were published by U.S. Gold and developed by Tiertex in 1989. The U.S. Gold versions have the order of the third and fourth stages swapped (the order of the cut-scenes were kept the same, causing a continuity error), and the final battle with the Grandmaster missing (the last stages end with the battle against the giant robot gorilla Mecha Pong). As a result, the ending was changed to reveal that the events of the game were a simulation that the player was going through. All five versions featured downgraded graphics, less music and missing enemies compared to the arcade version. Additionally, the controls were modified so that the game would be compatible with one-button joystick controllers. The Atari ST version was used a base for the Amiga version, not utilising the Amiga's graphics processors for improved performance and graphics. Despite these changes, all of the U.S. Gold releases received high review scores by computer game magazines of the time. Later, in 1992, the assets of the Atari ST version were used for the conversion on the Master System, also made by Tiertex. A final fight with the Grandmaster was added in this version, but the ending credits continue to say that all was just a simulation.

Sega produced their home version of Strider for the Mega Drive/Genesis, which was released in Japan on September 29, 1990, with subsequent releases in North America and the PAL region. It was advertised as one of the first 8-Megabit cartridges for the system, and went on to be a bestseller. This version was also re-released for the Wii Virtual Console in Japan on November 15, 2011 and in North America on February 16, 2012. It was re-released again on the Nintendo Classics service on October 25, 2021. The Genesis/Mega Drive version contains a different ending from the arcade game. This ending shows the destruction of the final stage as the game's protagonist makes his escape. This is then followed by the main credit sequence that sees Hiryu flying his glider in space and reminiscing about the various encounters he had during his mission as he heads back to earth. The ending theme was an edited combination of two separate pieces of music planned for the arcade game, but replaced with a repeat of the first level music. Computer magazine ACE considered the previous Amiga conversion to be "as good as this one".

Capcom separately produced a version for the X68000 computer in 1991, releasing it exclusively in Japan. It is a very close reproduction of the arcade original, with minimal changes.

A version for the Capcom Power System Changer was planned and previewed but never released.

NEC Avenue produced a PC Engine CD version of Strider Hiryu, which was released exclusively in Japan on September 22, 1994 as a CD-ROM² title which requires the Arcade Card expansion. It features an all-new desert stage that was not in the arcade version, as well as newly recorded cut-scenes, music, and dialogue, with Japanese voice actor Kaneto Shiozawa as the voice of Hiryu and Kōji Totani as the Grand Master. The PC Engine CD version had a long development process, having been planned in various formats, including the SuperGrafx at one point.

The PlayStation version of Strider was first released by Capcom in 2000 as a second disc which came packaged with the PlayStation version of Strider 2. The North American release has the Strider and Strider 2 game code pressed onto the wrong disc. This version was reissued separately in Japan on October 24, 2006 as part of the Capcom Game Books series, which included an extended manual and strategy guide for the game. This makes this standalone version technically the last original PlayStation game ever made, released after the system's discontinuation in March 2006.

The original arcade version was included in the 2006 video game compilations Capcom Classics Collection: Remixed for the PlayStation Portable and Capcom Classics Collection Vol. 2 for the PlayStation 2 and Xbox. A Japanese mobile phone version was released in 2010.

== Reception ==
Reception

Review scores
Publication	Score							
Publication	Amiga	Arcade	Atari ST	Master System	PC	Sega Genesis	TurboGrafx-16	Wii
ACE	910		910		876 (CPC)	919		
AllGame		4/5		3/5		4.5/5		4/5
Computer and Video Games			92%		88% (CPC)	95%		
Electronic Gaming Monthly						9/10, 9/10, 9/10, 9/10		
Famitsu						30/40	20/40	
GamePro						22/25		
GameSpy						9/10		
Joystick				80%		96%		
Nintendo Life								9/10
ST Format			92%					
The Games Machine (UK)	94%	Positive	93%		93% (CPC)			
Your Sinclair		89%						
Zero	81%		84%					
Atari ST User			8/10					
Commodore User		8/10						
Mean Machines				67%		92%		
Mega						89%		
MegaTech						91%		
Sega Power				74%		10/10		
The One	80%		80%					

Awards
Publication	Award
Electronic Gaming Monthly	Best Game of the Year, Best Graphics in a Video Game
Gamest	Best Production, Best Action Game
Sinclair User	SU Classic
Your Sinclair	YS Megagame

In the United Kingdom, Strider was the best-selling arcade game for three months during early 1989 (between February and April). In Japan, Game Machine listed Strider on their April 1, 1989 issue as being the third most-successful table arcade unit of the month, outperforming titles like Ninja Gaiden.

=== Reviews ===
Strider opened to critical acclaim, particularly for its gameplay, graphics, diverse music, and voice samples. The original arcade game received positive reviews from critics upon release. The Games Machine called it "THE platform and ladders game to be seen playing at the moment." Your Sinclair called it "brilliant" and "a real epic" with "some imaginative stuff" in the game. Commodore User praised the "high definition graphics, brilliant movements and good old-fashioned blasting action" along with a "bit of tongue-in-cheek political" content.

The Genesis version was praised for its accurate and detailed faithfulness to the original. Upon release, GamePro called the Genesis port "a faithful translation of the arcade hit", and praised its "gorgeous graphics, non-stop arcade-style action, and ... captivating and unusual sound track." EGM awarded the Genesis port best video game of the year in 1990 and winner of their best graphics category.

According to Retro Gamer's Darran Jones, "everything about Strider was epic. Its backgrounds were brilliantly designed and featured an array of exotic locations, while its sprite design was superb. There was a uniqueness to Strider art design that gave it a distinctive look back in 1989 and still makes it stand out brilliantly today. It's a mysterious mish-mash of different cultures that ensured it stood out from its arcade peers." Jones also praised the game's "stunning animation", gameplay, and controls, as well as its "superbly atmospheric" soundtrack.

Mark Caswell of Crash magazine referred to the game's graphics as detailed and incredible, the scrolling and action as smooth and called the gameplay "some of the most demanding gameplay ever invented".

=== Accolades ===
At Japan's 3rd Gamest Awards in 1989, the arcade version of Strider received the awards for Best Production and Best Action Game. Strider ranked in 5 different categories in Gamest's annual video game awards, the Gamest Grand Prix: 4th in the overall "Gamest Grand Prix", 5th in "Best Graphics", 3rd in "Best VGM" and 1st in "Best Action" and "Best Direction". The game also ranked 22nd in "Best 100 games of the Year", and several characters from the game also placed well in the "Best Characters" category: Hiryu at the lead in 3rd place, followed by Tong Pooh (13th), the Option A robot (21st), Grandmaster Meio (25th), Ouroboros (30th), and Strobaya (39th). In a 1991 Gamest reader poll, Strider was voted the ninth best arcade game of all time; they ranked Strider 9th in the "Top 30 Readers' Choice" from their special issue "The Best Game".

In 1990, Your Sinclair included the arcade game in its "Top of the Slots '89" list at third place.

In the 1990 Electronic Gaming Monthly awards, the Sega Genesis version of Strider received the awards for Best Game of the Year and Best Graphics in a Video Game. In 1992, Mega placed Strider at 31st spot in their list of top Mega Drive games of all time.

In 1997 EGM ranked the Genesis version the 42nd best console video game of all time, remarking that "any game where you can crawl on walls and do all kinds of cool flips is pretty awesome." In 2010, UGO.com included Strider in their list of the 25 video games that need sequels, and Game Informer included it on the list of ten gaming franchises that should be revived: "Imagine the sidescrolling insanity of the Metal Slug series, but replace grizzled soldiers with a badass ninja. That's Strider, and it's awesome." That same year, the game was also included as one of the titles in the book 1001 Video Games You Must Play Before You Die. ScrewAttack named it as the best Genesis game ever made, and Retro Gamer included it among the top ten Mega Drive games. In 2017, Gamesradar ranked Strider 33rd on its "Best Sega Genesis/Mega Drive games of all time."

== Legacy ==
=== Sequels ===
U.S. Gold and Tiertex later produced the licensed sequel Strider II, released in North America as Journey from Darkness: Strider Returns, while Capcom developed the unrelated Strider 2 for arcades and PlayStation in 1999–2000. A planned reboot by Grin was cancelled in 2009, before Double Helix Games developed the 2014 reboot for consoles and PC.

Outside the series, Hiryu became a recurring crossover character in the Marvel vs. Capcom games, appearing in Marvel vs. Capcom: Clash of Super Heroes (1998), Marvel vs. Capcom 2: New Age of Heroes (2000), Ultimate Marvel vs. Capcom 3 (2011), and Marvel vs. Capcom: Infinite (2017). He also appeared in titles including Adventure Quiz: Capcom World 2 (1992), SNK vs. Capcom: Card Fighters' Clash (1999), Namco × Capcom (2005), and Project X Zone 2 (2015), and was planned for the cancelled Capcom Fighting All-Stars.

=== Related games ===
Strider director Kouichi Yotsui left Capcom soon after its release. He later designed an unofficial, coin-operated sequel for Mitchell Corporation in 1996. Yotsui considers that game, titled Cannon-Dancer in Japan and Osman in the West, a "self-parody" of his work on Strider. Moon Diver is a 2011 Square Enix game that shares some of the same gameplay elements and was also created by Yotsui. The game Run Saber, released by Atlus in 1993 for the Super NES, is often compared to Strider due to them being similar in play mechanics.

=== Influence ===
Strider has spawned numerous fansites and retrospectives. According to Eurogamer, Strider was a vital influence on video game franchises such as Devil May Cry, Ninja Gaiden, and God of War. According to Retro Gamer, the over-the-top action of future Capcom franchises, such as Devil May Cry and Viewtiful Joe, draws from Strider, particularly in their inclusion of the "boss rush".

Strider was also influential among European developers: platform games including Assassin, Zool: Ninja of the Nth Dimension, and Wolfchild were influenced in either gameplay or aesthetics from the original arcade coin-op game.

In later years, various indie developers have published platform games featuring the gameplay style of Strider, with titles such as Oniken, Cataegis: The White Wind, Tänzer, Blazing Chrome, and Bushiden.

The game and its world has also served as a point of inspiration for Keiji Inafune, the co-creator of Mega Man. Inafune has stated that he has always liked the "world view" of Strider and modeled the name of Mega Man X co-protagonist Zero after one of its characters (reportedly, Solo). Capcom has also stated that one of the game's villains, Tong Pooh, served as inspiration for Street Fighter character, Chun-Li.

British rapper Tinchy Stryder adopted his stage name partially after Strider, which he often played as a boy.
