= Salaryman Kintaro (film) =

1999 Japanese film by Takashi Miike

- Film poster
- Directed by: Takashi Miike
- Screenplay by: Kenji Nakazono; Naoko Harada
- Based on: Salaryman Kintaro by Hiroshi Motomiya
- Produced by: Morihiro Kodama; Mitsunori Morita; Kazuya Hamana
- Cinematography: Hideo Yamamoto
- Edited by: Yasushi Shimamura
- Music by: Koji Endo
- Production company: Toho Company
- Distributed by: Pathfinder Pictures; Toho Company; Tokyo Broadcasting System
- Release date: December 13, 1999 (Japan)
- Running time: 110 minutes
- Country: Japan
- Language: Japanese

Salaryman Kintaro (Japanese: サラリーマン金太郎, Hepburn: Sararīman Kintarō), also known as White-Collar Worker Kintaro, is a 1999 Japanese live-action drama film based on Hiroshi Motomiya's manga series Salaryman Kintaro.

== Plot ==
Former motorcycle gang leader Kintaro Yajima is a dedicated father to his son Ryuta and holds a white-collar job performing cost calculations at the Yamato construction company. While defending a hostess's honor at the company's 40th anniversary party, Kintaro inadvertently insults Mr. Tanioka, an influential politician, and causes a construction project contract intended for Yamato to be awarded to the rival Oshima company instead. As punishment, Kintaro is relocated from Tokyo to Tōhoku to work under Mr. Igo, an angry man who spends all day playing mahjong and drinking and who accepts bribes from competing construction companies to allow them to underbid him for projects. Kintaro and his son Ryuta stay with Kayo Nakamura and her daughter Masumi, who has done some investigating and learned that her supposedly deceased father is actually Mr. Igo.

Meanwhile, Mr. Oshima conspires with Mr. Tanioka to get all of Yamato's future construction projects cancelled and form an empire with other construction companies under Mr. Tanioka. The ambitious Takatsukasa sees Mr. Oshima leaving Mr. Tanioka's office together with Mr. Kuramoto from the company Hokutō Sōken. After Kintaro rescues a baby from a burning building, the baby's father Mr. Handa asks Kintaro personally for a cost estimate for the upcoming renovation of town hall. Mr. Shibamata suggests to Kintaro that he should allow the contract to go to Shibamata's company, which would the hire Yamato as a subcontractor. Kintaro refuses, breaking the old-fashioned tradition of pre-agreements for public contracts.

When the final bids are read aloud by Mr. Handa, Shibamata's bid is mysteriously 300 yen lower than Yamato's. Kintaro demands to see the bid documents and discovers that the cost estimate was left blank on Shibamata's bid and that Shibamata had forced Handa to state an amount lower than Yamato's bid. Handa confesses and later hangs himself from a bridge. Men from the Tenpō Gang kidnap Kintaro and beat him but Masumi asks for her father's help so Mr. Igo finds the men and beats them. Igo discovers Tanioka's plan to drive the larger construction companies out of business and develop a large conglomerate out of smaller companies under his control and explains it to Kintaro, Yamato, and Kayo. A mail bomb later explodes in Igo's office, leaving him hospitalized. A mail bomb sent to Kayo's home explodes and injures Kayo and Ryuta. Kintaro asks Yamato to look after Ryuta as he leaves to settle the score.

Kintaro calls together 2,000 members of his old motorcycle gang known as the Angels but the city's police force blocks their movement. Kintaro and his yakuza brother Tadashi Shiina continue alone to confront the Tenpō Gang and its leader Kudo. Just as Kintaro is about to cut off Kudo's head, Igo arrives and says that he will punish Kudo and that Kintaro should go be a salaryman. Outside, dozens of police with riot shields block the street and arrest Kintaro for traffic violations, bodily harm, and burglary.

Yamato visits Kintaro in prison and calls him a hero. Kintaro is sentenced to six months in prison but the sentence is reduced to probation for one year due to the extenuating circumstances of Kintaro's family being under the threat of violence from the Tenpō Gang. Takatsukasa provides evidence to the public prosecutor that Tanioka has been taking bribes from Hokutō Sōken, leading to a wave of arrests. Kintaro leaves the court and is greeted by a crowd of cheering supporters along with Masumi and Ryuta.

== Cast ==
- Katsunori Takahashi - Kintaro Yajima
- Yoko Saito - Misuzu Suenaga
- Kanako Enomoto - Mimi Suenaga
- Tomonosuke Shimada - Ryuta Yajima
- Masahiko Tsugawa - Ryunosuke Yamato
- Shuichiro Moriyama - Genzo Oshima
- Taisaku Akino - Yusaku Kurokawa
- Tsutomu Yamazaki - Yozo Igo
- Yōko Nogiwa - Kayo Nakamura
- Michiko Hada - Masumi Nakamura
- Toshiaki Megumi - Ichiro Maeda
- Miki Mizuno - Hitomi Aihara
- Masanobu Katsumura - Masakazu Tanaka
- Naoki Hosaka - Takatsukasa
- Shingo Yamashiro - Seishiro Tanioka
- Hiromasa Taguchi - Fumihiko Handa
- Satoshi Uzaki - Tadashi Shiina

== Production ==
The film was produced by Toho and was intended to form a bridge between two seasons of the television series.

== Release ==
The film was released on December 13, 1999.

== Home video ==
The film released on DVD in the United States through Pathfinder Home Entertainment under the title White Collar Worker Kintaro on October 26, 2004.

== Reception ==
In his book Agitator: The Cinema of Takashi Miike, author Tom Mes calls Salaryman Kintaro "thoroughly conventional" and "outright commercial".

Reviewer Rouven Linnarz of Asian Movie Pulse called Salaryman Kintaro "a very generic film" with a "one-dimensional" message and lead character.
