= Tänzer (video game) =

2019 video game

- Developer: Mikael Tillander
- Publisher: Mega Cat Studios
- Composer: Johan Agurén
- Platform: Sega Genesis
- Release: WW: 2019
- Genre: platform
- Mode: Single-player

Tänzer is a 2019 hack and slash action-platform video game developed by Mikael Tillander and originally published by Mega Cat Studios for the Sega Genesis. In the game, players assume the role of a ballerina whose body was transformed to fight against enemies in a post-apocalyptic setting. The title was crowdfunded through Kickstarter, being first released in 2019 for the Mega Drive and has since been re-released as part of the Mega Cat Studios – Collection 1 compilation for Evercade in 2020.

== Gameplay ==
Gameplay screenshot

Tänzer is a hack and slash action-platform game reminiscent of Hagane: The Final Conflict, Osman and Strider, where players assume the role of a ballerina whose body was transformed to fight against enemies and bosses through multiple stages in a post-apocalyptic setting.

During gameplay, players can execute a variety of moves including slash attacks and triple jumps, as well as a "Transmutation" ability. After completing a stage, players can buy items such as additional "Transmutation" abilities via gold currency dropped by defeated enemies along the way. Attacking on determined locations is also crucial, as certain setpieces in stages hosts secrets within their scenery. There is no save feature but an item that allows players to resume their progress after a game over is available to buy in the game's shop mechanic.

== Development and release ==
Tänzer was created by Swedish developer Mikael Tillander acting as the sole programmer, as well as creating the pixel art and sound effects, while the soundtrack and cover art were handled by Johan Agurén and Fergi Susetiyo respectively. Agurén also provided additional game design during development. Tillander stated that the project was influenced by games like Strider and Osman, artists such as Keita Amemiya and Roger Dean, as well as the anime series Guyver. When looking for an idea to his project, Tillander stated that he remembered Hagane: The Final Conflict and settled on making a hack and slash platform-esque game for the Sega Mega Drive.

Tänzer was first launched on Kickstarter in 2018 and successfully reached its funding goal of 20,000 SEK in hours. The game was published for the Sega Mega Drive by Mega Cat Studios in 2019 as both a physical and digital release. The physical version was released with packaging mimicking officially licensed Mega Drive releases from multiple regions. The title was later re-released in 2020 as part of the Mega Cat Studios – Collection 1 compilation for Evercade.

== Reception ==
Pixelated Gamer's Dan Adcock gave the original Sega Mega Drive release a highly positive review, praising various aspects such as the visuals, gameplay and difficulty. Retro Gamer's Darran Jones gave the game a positive outlook on the Mega Cat Studios – Collection 1 for Evercade, praising Johan Agurén's music and stating that "Mikael Tillander's Strider clone tops the Mega Cat collection".
