= Ryūzaki =

Ryūzaki may refer to:

- Sakuno Ryuzaki and Sumire Ryuzaki of The Prince of Tennis
- Dinosaur Ryuzaki of Yu-Gi-Oh!
- The most common alias of L of Death Note
- Umi Ryuuzaki of Magic Knight Rayearth
- Kazuya Ryuuzaki of Daimos
- Strider Ryūzaki of Strider (NES video game)
