= Shūichirō Moriyama =

Japanese actor (1934–2021)

- 森山 周一郎
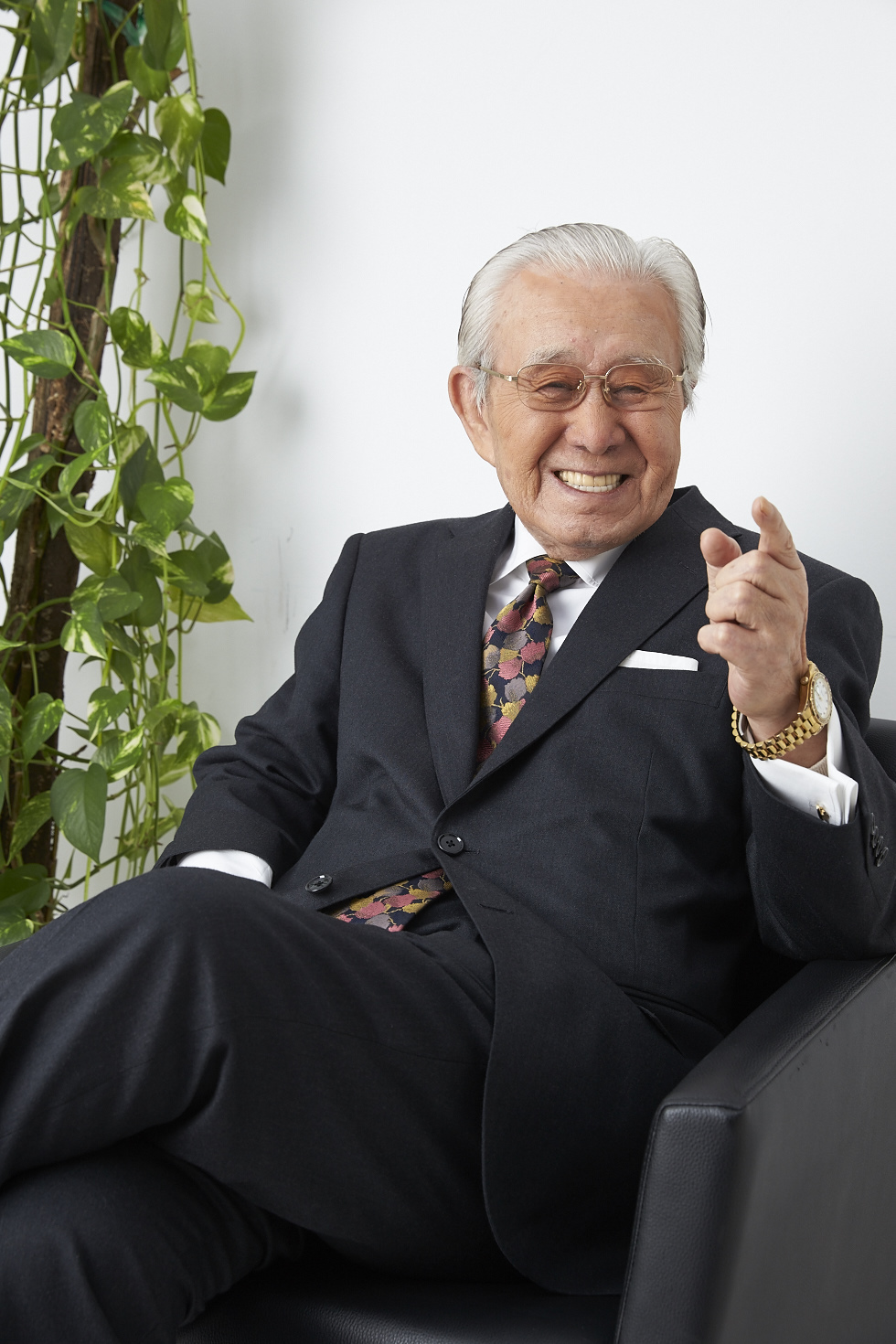
- Moriyama in 2016
- Born: Hiroo Ōtsuka (大塚 博夫); 26 July 1934; Nagoya, Aichi, Empire of Japan
- Died: 8 February 2021 (aged 86); Saitama Prefecture, Japan
- Occupations: Actor, voice actor
- Years active: 1957–2021

Hiroo Ōtsuka (大塚 博夫, Ōtsuka Hiroo; 26 July 1934 – 8 February 2021), known by the stage name Shūichirō Moriyama (森山 周一郎, Moriyama Shūichirō), was a Japanese actor and voice actor. He was the official Japanese dub-over artist of actors Telly Savalas (with whom he met several times), Jean Gabin, Spencer Tracy, and Lino Ventura.

== Overview ==
On 23 July 1999, he was paralysed in his right half by a cerebral infarction, but his body did not fully recover due to the lack of early treatment. Numbness in his limbs was also not easy to improve, with transient cerebral ischemic attacks causing his body to move involuntarily, and from the time of hospitalization until his death he needed continuous rehabilitation.

He died of pneumonia at 9:10 p.m. on February 8, 2021, aged 86, at a hospital in Saitama Prefecture.

== Filmography ==
=== Television dramas ===
- Furuhata Ninzaburō (episode 10) (Uno)
- Ōedo Sōsamō
- The Samurai
- Seibu Keisatsu
  - Episode 14: 'The Assassin Arrives' (1980) - Eiji Okura
  - Episode 27: 'Scarred White Coat Coat' (1980) - Gozo Akashi
  - Episode 100: 'The Girl Holding a Bomb' (1981) - President of the Japan Medical Association
  - Episode 125: 'The Promised Reward' (1982) - Daizo Morioka
  - Seibu Keisatsu PART-II Episode 17: 'Death!!' 'Rampaging Truck' (1982) - Masaru Gunji
  - Seibu Keisatsu PART-III Episode 29: 'Even If Life Ends!' Kazuhiko Hirao' (1983) - Representative Kensaku Kuroda

=== Films ===
- Shall We Dance? (1996) (Ryo Kishikawa)
- Salaryman Kintaro (1999) (Genzo Oshima)
- Tsuribaka Nisshi Eleven (2000) (Horita)

=== Television animation ===
- Tiger Mask (1969)
- Captain (1980) (Aoba Baseball Manager)
- Digimon Tamers (2001) (Zhuqiaomon)
- Jormungand (2012) (Narration)

=== Theatrical animation ===
- Nutcracker Fantasy (1979) (Poet)
- Phoenix 2772 (1980) (Volcan)
- Arcadia of My Youth (1982) (Old Tokargan Soldier)
- Dragon Ball: Curse of the Blood Rubies (1986) (King Gourmeth)
- Porco Rosso (1992) (Porco Rosso)
- Doraemon: Nobita and the Tin Labyrinth (1993) (Napogistora)
- Ninja Scroll (1993) (Hyobu Sakaki)
- Doraemon: Nobita in the Robot Kingdom (2002) (Dester)

=== Video games ===
- Kingdom Hearts (2002) (Flotsam and Jetsam)
- The Last Remnant (2008) (Wagram)
- Final Fantasy Type-0 (2011) (Cid Aulstyne)
- Final Fantasy Type-0 HD (2015) (Cid Aulstyne)
- Inazuma Eleven (2008) (Hibiki Seigou)

=== Dubbing roles ===
==== Live-action ====
- Telly Savalas
  - The Assassination Bureau (Lord Bostwick)
  - On Her Majesty's Secret Service (Ernst Stavro Blofeld) (TBS Edition)
  - Violent City (1985 TBS edition) (Al Weber)
  - Pretty Maids All in a Row (Police Captain Sam Surcher)
  - Sonny & Jed (1979 TV Tokyo edition) (Sheriff Franciscus)
  - Kojak (Lieutenant Theodore "Theo" Kojak)
  - Inside Out (Harry Morgan)
  - Beyond the Poseidon Adventure (1989 TBS edition) (Captain Stefan Svevo)
  - Escape to Athena (1982 TBS edition) (Zeno)
  - Cannonball Run II (1988 TV Asahi edition) (Hymie Kaplan)
- Spencer Tracy
  - Boys Town (Father Flanagan)
  - Boom Town ("Square John" Sand)
  - Northwest Passage (Major Rogers)
  - The Sea of Grass (Col. Jim Brewton)
  - Father of the Bride (Stanley T. Banks)
  - Father's Little Dividend (Stanley T. Banks)
  - Broken Lance (1969 TV Asahi edition) (Matt Devereaux)
  - Desk Set (Richard Sumner)
  - Judgment at Nuremberg (Chief Judge Dan Haywood)
- Jean Gabin
  - La belle équipe (Jean dit Jeannot)
  - Pépé le Moko (1976 Nippon TV edition) (Pépé le Moko)
  - Touchez pas au grisbi (Max dit Max le Menteur)
  - Voici le temps des assassins (André Chatelin)
  - In Case of Adversity (Maitre André Gobillot)
  - Any Number Can Win (1970, 1972 TV Tokyo and 1975 TV Asahi editions) (Mister Charles)
  - Le clan des siciliens (Vittorio Manalese)
  - Deux hommes dans la ville (Germain Cazeneuve)
- Charles Bronson
  - Rider on the Rain (1977 TBS edition) (Dobbs)
  - The Mechanic (1977 TBS edition) (Arthur Bishop)
  - Red Sun (1975 TBS edition) (Link Stuart)
  - Breakheart Pass (1980 TBS edition) (Deakin)
  - From Noon till Three (1981 TBS edition) (Graham)
  - Love and Bullets (1981 TBS edition) (Charlie Congers)
- The Big Brawl (Dominici (José Ferrer))
- Fist of Fury (Hiroshi Suzuki (Chikara Hashimoto))
- Frankenstein Created Woman (1970 TV Asahi edition) (Baron Victor Frankenstein (Peter Cushing))
- The Getaway (1978 Fuji TV edition) (Jack Beynon (Ben Johnson))
- The Great Silence (1972 TV Asahi edition) (Henry Pollicut (Luigi Pistilli))
- Last Action Hero (1996 Fuji TV edition) (Tony Vivaldi (Anthony Quinn))
- Lawrence of Arabia (1978 Nippon TV edition) (Turkish Bey (José Ferrer))
- The Magnificent Seven (1974 TV Asahi edition) (Harry Luck (Brad Dexter))
- The Man from Hong Kong (Inspector Bob Taylor (Roger Ward))
- Prison Break (Jonathan Krantz (Leon Russom))
- The Professionals (George Cowley (Gordon Jackson))
- The Reptile (Tom Bailey (Michael Ripper))
- Rollercoaster (1981 Nippon TV edition) (Agent Hoyt (Richard Widmark))
- Tony Arzenta (1976 TV Asahi edition) (Nick Gusto (Richard Conte))

==== Animation ====
- The Little Mermaid (Flotsam and Jetsam)
- Rango (Buford)
- The Rescuers Down Under (Percival C. McLeach)
- Watership Down (General Woundwort)
