= Hiroshi Motomiya =

Japanese manga artist (born 1947)

Hiroshi Motomiya (本宮 ひろ志; born June 25, 1947) is a Japanese manga artist from Chiba Prefecture. His works include Tenchi wo Kurau (1983–1984) and Salary Man Kintaro (1994–2002). By November 2026, his various works had over 130 million copies in circulation, making him one of the best-selling authors of all time.

== Career ==
Motomiya's Ore no Sora ran in Shueisha's Weekly Playboy from 1975 to 1978. It has spawned several sequel series and adaptations. He serialized Otokogi in Shogakukan's Big Comic from 1979 to 1980. It also spawned several sequel manga and adaptations.

Motomiya serialized Takeki Ōgon no Kuni in Shueisha's Business Jump from 1990 to 1992. It has spawned several sequels, each following a different figure from Japanese history.

On October 13, 2004, Shueisha suspended Motomiya's Kuni ga Moeru manga from Weekly Young Jump after 37 politicians and more than 200 other people complained about a photograph that was used in the series in mid-September. The original photo is purported to depict the Nanjing Massacre, which the politicians claimed to have never happened. The uniform worn by the soldier also did not match the time period, thus the photo had not been accurately verified. Motomiya drew it to have the accurate uniform, leading to complaints of misrepresenting history. The manga was suspended for five issues before resuming serialization. Shueisha censored the tankōbon edition of Kuni ga Moeru, by editing or removing 21 pages.

Motomiya began Nisemono? in July 2007 for the Pfizer pharmaceutical company. It was serialized on their Japanese website and aimed to help men who suffer from erectile dysfunction.

Katsu Fūtarō!! was serialized in Shueisha's Grand Jump from 2013 to 2016. In 2017, Motomiya launched Kōun Ryūsui in the same magazine. It follows Chinese explorer Xu Fu, who travels to Japan seeking the elixir of eternal life. He launched Good Job, a collaboration with Hiroshi Takano, in Weekly Young Jump the following year. It ran until July 2020. Motomiya briefly serialized Umi o Wataru be in Grand Jump for four months in 2020. The artist then serialized Boku, Imasu yo. in Weekly Young Jump from 2020 until 2021.

== Moto Kikaku ==
Moto Kikaku (formerly Motomiya Kikaku) is a group of manga artists, founded by Motomiya. They are best known in the West for the Strider Hiryu manga (published by Kadokawa Shoten), which was developed as a tie-in to Capcom's video game hit Strider. The group had input in Strider 2's character designs, and the original manga's plot was adapted as the plot of the NES version.

However, Strider was not the only Moto Kikaku property to be adapted. Capcom based four games on Motomiya's Tenchi wo Kurau series, an inversion of their previous collaboration as the series ended in 1984: Destiny of an Emperor and Destiny of an Emperor II for the NES, and Dynasty Wars and Warriors of Fate for the CPS-1.

Moto Kikaku is credited whenever Strider Hiryu appears in a game. On the staff roll for the PC-Engine port of Warriors of Fate, they share a "Special Thanks" credit on the same line with Hiroshi Motomiya.

== Works ==
- Otoko Ippiki Gaki Daishō (男一匹ガキ大将; 1968-1973)
- Ore no Sora (俺の空; 1975–1978)
- Otokogi (男樹; 1979–1980)
- Ore no Sora: Keiji-hen (俺の空 刑事編; 1979–1981)
- Tenchi o Kurau (天地を喰らう; 1983–1984)
- Takeki Ōgon no Kuni (猛き黄金の国; 1990–1992)
- Ore no Sora: Sanshirō-hen (俺の空 三四郎編; 1992–1993)
- Salary Man Kintaro (サラリーマン金太郎; 1994–2002)
- Shin Otokogi -Kyōtarō-hen- (新・男樹 -京太郎編-; 1995–1997)
- Shin Otokogi Yondaime (男樹 四代目; 1999–2000)
- Takeki Ōgon no Kuni: Dōsan (猛き黄金の国 道三; 1999–2001)
- Kuni ga Moeru (国が燃える; 2002–2005)
- Nisemono? (ニセモノ?; 2007)
- Takeki Ōgon no Kuni: Yagyu Munenori (猛き黄金の国 柳生宗矩; 2010–2011)
- Otokogi ~Murata Kyōichi (Yondaime)~ (男樹〜村田京一〈四代目〉〜; 2012–)
- Bakumatsu Gurentai (幕末紅蓮隊; 2013–2014)
- Katsu Fūtarō!! (喝 風太郎!!; 2013–2016)
- Kōun Ryūsui (こううんりゅうすい; 2017–2019)
- Good Job (グッドジョブ; 2018–2020) - written by Hiroshi Takano
- Umi o Wataru be (海を渡るべ; 2020)
- Boku, Imasu yo. (僕、いますよ。; 2020–2021)
- Takeki Ōgon no Kuni: Inō Tadataka (猛き黄金の国 伊能忠敬; 2020–2021)
- Takeki Ōgon no Kuni: Ninomiya Kinjirō (猛き黄金の国 二宮金次郎; 2021–2022)
- Takeki Ōgon no Kuni: Yuri Kimimasa (猛き黄金の国 由利公正; 2022)
- Takeki Ōgon no Kuni: Takahashi Korekiyo (猛き黄金の国 高橋是清; 2022–present)
