= Strider II (1990 video game) =

1990 video game

Journey from Darkness: Strider Returns
- 1990 advert
- Developer: Tiertex
- Publisher: U.S. Gold
- Platforms: Mega Drive/Genesis, Master System, Game Gear, Amiga, Amstrad CPC, Atari ST, Commodore 64, ZX Spectrum
- Release: EU: November 1990
- Genres: Action, platform
- Mode: Single-player

Journey from Darkness: Strider Returns (known as Strider II in PAL region) is a 1990 action-platform game published by U.S. Gold (under license from Capcom) and originally released for various computer platforms. It is a British-developed sequel to Capcom's arcade video game Strider, which U.S. Gold previously ported to home computers in Europe.

Capcom later developed their own sequel in 1999, titled Strider 2 for the arcades and PlayStation, which ignores U.S. Gold's version of Strider Returns.

== Gameplay ==
The objective of the game is to rescue the Princess of Planet Magenta from a terrorist group that is keeping her captive. The controls in the computer version are similar to U.S. Gold's home computer ports of the original Strider, although the character cannot slide nor climb ceilings like in the original game. However, he can still climb walls, as well as ropes. In addition to his cypher, he can also use a rifle whenever he is standing still. If the player character has collected enough energy icons throughout each stage, he will transform into a wheeled robot when confronting the boss at the end of each stage. As a robot, Strider can shoot lasers, but cannot jump nor crouch. His robot form has a separate health gauge from his regular health gauge as a human. When his robot gauge runs out, he will transform back to a human. The game consists of five stages.

== Release ==
Strider Returns was released for the Amiga, Atari ST, Commodore 64, Amstrad CPC, and ZX Spectrum. Strider Returns was later remade for the Sega Genesis, Master System and Game Gear in 1992.

== Ports ==
Two years after the release of the computer versions, U.S. Gold and Tiertex ported Strider Returns to the Sega Genesis/Mega Drive. The Genesis version of Strider Returns differs from the previous computer version in several ways. While the plot is the same, the antagonist is now the Grandmaster (Meioh) from the original Strider (who is referred in the game's manual as the "Evil Master"). Although the main character uses the same sprite as in the Genesis version of the original Strider, this Strider is addressed in the manual as "Hinjo" (instead of "Hiryu", the actual code name of the original protagonist).

The player controls Hinjo similarly to Hiryu in the first Genesis game (with the ability to slide and move under ceilings retained). Instead of a gun like in the home computer versions, Hinjo throws shurikens but only if he collects them first. Instead of transforming into a robot when he confronts a boss, Hinjo collects orbs throughout each stage instead. These orbs will surround Hinjo and protect him when he faces the stage's boss. The player can choose between Hiryu's original cypher from the first game or a new "sweeping" cypher.

Strider Returns was also released for the 8-bit Master System in Europe. This version features gameplay similar to its Genesis counterpart. Unlike the Genesis version, the Strider's supply of shurikens are unlimited, but he can only throw two on-screen at the same time. Due to the fewer buttons of the Master System's controller, shurikens are thrown while the player is standing still. This version was also converted to the Game Gear. An Atari Lynx version was being developed and listed as 50% complete, but it was never released.

== Reception ==
Matt Bielby of Your Sinclair magazine gave the game a positive review, and went so far as to claim that Capcom wanted to use the Sinclair port of this game as the basis for a coin-op sequel.

The four reviewers of Electronic Gaming Monthly gave the Genesis version a 6.75 out of 10, describing it as a decent but disappointing sequel. They praised the massive size of the game and the high amount of digitized voices, but criticized that the animation is much too choppy. Three of the four also felt that the gameplay lacked the excitement of the original Strider. They gave the Game Gear version a unanimous score of 7 out of 10, but were sharply divided in their opinions. Two of them felt it to be "surprisingly better on the Game Gear than on the Genesis", citing better playability with far less choppiness in the animation, while the other two felt it to be far worse than the Genesis version, complaining of both inferior graphics and the annoyingly long distance the player character is knocked back when hit. GamePro took the middle ground, saying the "Graphics and game play parallel the Genesis version." They praised the controls, large sprites, and detailed backgrounds, but criticized the slower pace and droning soundtrack, and concluded "Strider fans will welcome his return, but others will shrug."

In a Strider series retrospective, Ken Horowitz of Sega-16.com compared Strider Returns to "seeing a loved one revived as a mindless zombie". Travis Fahs, writing a Retro feature for IGN, commented that U.S. Gold had made multiple improvements to Strider Returns for its console ports, but that the core problem of dull level design remained.
