= Katsunori Takahashi =

Japanese singer and actor (born 1964)

- 高橋 克典
- Born: December 15, 1964 (age 61); Yokohama, Kanagawa Prefecture, Japan
- Occupations: Singer, actor
- Years active: 1980–present
- Agent: K-Dash
- Spouse: Hanna Nakanishi (2004–present)
- Musical career
- Genres: J-pop
- Instruments: Vocals; Guitar
- Labels: WEA Japan; Nippon Columbia; Avex Trax
- Website: www.katsunori.net

Katsunori Takahashi (高橋 克典, Takahashi Katsunori; born December 15, 1964, in Yokohama, Kanagawa Prefecture, Japan) is a Japanese singer and actor who is represented by the talent agency, K-Dash.

== Filmography ==
=== Films ===
Year	Title	Role	Notes	Ref.
1999	Salaryman Kintaro	Kintaro Yajima	Lead role	
2022	Soul at Twenty	Takurō Hoshino		
2022	The Violence Action	Kinoshita		
2023	From the End of the World			
2024	Ranpo no Gen'ei	Edogawa Ranpo		
2024	Tomorrow in the Finder			
2025	Blazing Fists	Daisuke Yagura		
2025	One Last Throw	Masashi Yokota		
2026	The Honest Realtor: The Movie	Masato Ikaruga		

=== TV series ===
Year	Title	Role	Notes	Ref.
2020	Awaiting Kirin	Oda Nobuhide	Taiga drama	
2022–23	Maiagare!	Kōta Iwakura	Asadora	
2022–24	The Honest Realtor	Masato Ikaruga	2 seasons	
2024	Ōoku	Tokugawa Ieshige		
2025	Captured Broadcasting Station	Yashiro Keigo		

=== Video games ===
Year	Title	Role	Notes	Ref.
2014	Ryū ga Gotoku Ishin!	Takechi Hanpeita		

== Awards and nominations ==
Year	Award	Category	Work(s)	Result	Ref.
1996	20th Elan d'or Awards	Newcomer of the Year	Himself	Won	
2000	23rd Japan Academy Film Prize	Newcomer of the Year	Salaryman Kintarō	Won	
