= Moon Diver =

2011 video game

- Moon Diver logo
- Developer: feelplus
- Publisher: Square Enix
- Director: Koichi Yotsui
- Producer: Andou Takehiro
- Platforms: PlayStation Network, Xbox Live Arcade
- Release: PSN: JP/NA: March 29, 2011; PAL: March 30, 2011; XBLA; May 4, 2011
- Genres: Side-scroller, platformer
- Modes: Single-player, multiplayer

Moon Diver (ムーンダイバー, Mūndaibā), formerly known as Necromachina, is a side-scrolling platforming video game developed by feelplus and published by Square Enix. It was released in 2011 for the PlayStation Network in March, and for the Xbox Live Arcade on May 4.

== Plot ==
It is the dawn of the 22nd century on the third planet from the sun. Humanity, broken free from its eschatological thralls, now watches as a lone boy stands before it. Within his hands, he controls the power of Mephistopheles – a force which can breathe life into that which has none. Animated machines devour the helpless; buildings shower the streets with storms of glass; cups, trains, bridges, whole towns – the remnants of civilization are transformed into bloodthirsty beasts whose only purpose is to wield the hammer of judgment.

The boy's name is Faust, and he will not stop until he has cleansed the planet of humankind and claimed it as his own. Centuries have passed since his advent, and the world now holds its breath as the End of Days draws ever closer, yet hope is not lost. Hidden among humanity's last remaining survivors, an elite unit of specially trained ninja known as Moondivers have been lying in wait for orders from their Shogun to embark on one final mission to reclaim the planet. Today, those orders arrived.

== Development ==
Koichi Yotsui directed the four-player side-scroller, with gameplay reminiscent of the Strider game series, which was also helmed by Yotsui.

== Reception ==
Reception

Aggregate score
Aggregator	Score	
Aggregator	PS3	Xbox 360
Metacritic	60/100	61/100

Review scores
Publication	Score	
Publication	PS3	Xbox 360
Eurogamer	7/10	N/A
Game Informer	7.25/10	7.25/10
GamePro	3/5	N/A
GameSpot	6.5/10	N/A
GameZone	7/10	N/A
IGN	7/10	7/10
Joystiq	3/5	N/A
Official Xbox Magazine (US)	N/A	4.5/10
PlayStation: The Official Magazine	5/10	N/A
Push Square	7/10	N/A
411Mania	8/10	8/10
Metro	6/10	N/A

The game received "mixed" reviews on both platforms according to the review aggregation website Metacritic. IGN called it fun but inconsistent and flawed. Official Xbox Magazine praised the co-op mode but criticized the unnecessary long stages and called the solo mode a hopeless grind. Game Informer said that the multiplayer component was more enjoyable and polished than the single player.
