= Run Saber =

1993 video game

- North American cover art by Julie Bell
- Developer: Hori Electric
- Publishers: NA: Atlus; FRA: Ludi Games; UK/DE: Imagineer
- Programmers: H. Takeda; Richard Rogers; Ryūichi Kawa; Takashi Sakamoto
- Artists: Atsuhito Okamoto; Atsushi Yamazoe; Susumu Tomizawa
- Composer: Hikoshi Hashimoto
- Platform: Super Nintendo Entertainment System
- Release: NA: September 1993; FRA: November 1993; UK: December 1993; DE: January 1994
- Genres: Action, platform
- Modes: Single-player, multiplayer

Run Saber is a side-scrolling action game developed by Horisoft and published by Atlus for the Super Nintendo Entertainment System. The game was released in North America on June 8, 1993, and in Europe in 1993. Run Saber features side-scrolling fighting as the two main heroes, Allen and Sheena, the Run Sabers, fight to save the planet. The gameplay is similar to Strider, Valis and some elements of Psycho Dream.

Run Saber was not released in Japan, despite being developed by a mostly-Japanese team.

== Gameplay ==
The appearance of this boss was changed in the final game due to content guideline violations.

After choosing either the male character, Allen, or the female character, Sheena, the player is sent to five different levels around a fantastical Earth. Sheena has an ice affinity, while Allen has a lightning one. A third Saber, Kurtz, is aligned with fire, and is an enemy the player must fight several times.

The players can use a slash attack (the standard attack) which Allen does forward and Sheena upward, use a mid-air kick, or use the Hyper Bomb (special pick up item). The players can also climb up and down walls and hang onto the ceiling. There is a power jump similar to the Screw Attack of Super Metroid.

In each of the five levels (Taj Base, Tong City, Jodvalley, Grey Fac, and Bruford), there are multiple minor bosses and one final boss at the end of each level. These battles are noted when an alert message appears on the screen. In between each boss, the player must fight hordes of enemies and collect health pickups and weapon enhancers.

== Plot ==
Years into the future after Earth has been overly polluted and resources are running low, a scientist quickly comes up with a solution: a new chemical that will reverse the effects of pollution. As colonists settle in space to avoid the pollution, the newfound chemical is quickly launched in a missile into the atmosphere where it explodes and releases the chemical, which begins to horribly mutate any and all humans infected with it. The scientist knew the effects of his chemical and uses the mutated people as his soldiers to rule the Earth.

Humanity's only hope is a new weapon known as Project Saber, three cyborgs that are genetically enhanced to supernatural levels. Kurtz, the first Saber, malfunctions and escapes to Earth before the project is complete. The remaining Sabers, Allen and Sheena, are dispatched to eliminate the scientist and his militant mutant threat, and to neutralize Kurtz if possible.

== Development and release ==
Originally, the boss at the end of the Tong City level was supposed to be a woman lying on her side, but Nintendo felt that this violated their content guidelines as they did not want to depict or reference violence against women on their hardware, so the woman was changed into a dead woman and was approved.

== Reception ==
Reception

Review scores
Publication	Score
Electronic Gaming Monthly	8/10
GamesMaster	59%
Official Nintendo Magazine	82/100
Super Play	59%
Total!	(UK) 60% (DE) 3+
VideoGames & Computer Entertainment	8/10
Nintendo Game Zone	52/100
Super Action	82%
Super Gamer	50%
Super Pro	60/100

Run Saber received average reviews.

Initial reviewers compared Run Saber to the Capcom arcade game Strider, noting that this is the only "Strider-style" game on the Super Nintendo Entertainment System.

The game received criticism for its short length and easy difficulty. As Super Pro comments, "It'll be over within the hour on the easiest setting, and not much longer on the hardest."
