= Yasuo Uchida =

Japanese author

Yasuo Uchida was a Japanese author who is one of the best-selling mystery authors and his works has sold more than 100 million copies in Japan alone. 115 million copies of his book have been published.
