= Salary Man Kintaro =

Japanese manga series and its adaptations

- First tankōbon volume cover, featuring Kintaro Yajima

サラリーマン金太郎 (Sarariiman Kintarō)
- Manga
- Written by: Hiroshi Motomiya
- Published by: Shueisha
- English publisher: NA: Manga Planet (digital); Crunchyroll Manga (digital)
- Imprint: Young Jump Comics
- Magazine: Weekly Young Jump
- Original run: 1994 – 2016
- Volumes: 45
- Series titles
- 1. Salary Man Kintaro (1994–2002, 30 volumes); 2. Salary Man Kintaro: Money Wars-hen (2005–2006, 4 volumes); 3. Shin Salaryman Kintaro (2009–2011, 7 volumes); 4. Salary Man Kintaro: 50-sai (2015–2016, 4 volumes)
- Television drama
- Original network: TBS
- Original run: January 10, 1999 – March 18, 2004
- Episodes: 44 (+ 1 special)
- Anime television series
- Directed by: Tomoharu Katsumata
- Produced by: Tetsuo Gensei; Hiroshi Shigekawa; Tōru Nakano; Satoshi Kubo; Kisei Takahashi
- Written by: Sukehiro Tomita
- Music by: Kenichi Kamio
- Studio: JCF
- Licensed by: NA: Arts Magic
- Original network: BS-i
- Original run: February 18, 2001 – March 18, 2001
- Episodes: 20
- Television drama
- Original network: TV Asahi
- Original run: October 10, 2008 – March 12, 2010
- Episodes: 20
- Other
- Live-action film (1999)
- icon

Salary Man Kintaro (Japanese: サラリーマン金太郎, Hepburn: Sararīman Kintarō) is a Japanese manga series written and illustrated by Hiroshi Motomiya. It was serialized in Shueisha's seinen manga magazine Weekly Young Jump from 1994 to 2002, with its chapters collected in 30 tankōbon volumes. It was followed by three series; Salary Man Kintaro: Money Wars-hen (2005–2006), Shin Salaryman Kintaro (2009–2011), and Salary Man Kintaro: 50-sai (2015–2016),

The manga follows Kintaro Yajima, a former Bōsōzoku gang leader who, as a promise to his late wife, has become a salaryman.

A live-action film adaptation premiered in 1999. A television drama adaptation aired for four seasons; the first one in 1999, the second in 2000, the third in 2002, and the fourth in 2004. Another drama adaptation aired for two seasons; the first one in 2008 and the second in 2010. A 20-episode anime television series aired in 2001. Two live-action films are set to premiere in 2025.

The manga has had over 35 million copies in circulation.

== Characters ==
Kintaro Yajima (矢島金太郎, Yajima Kintarō)
Voiced by: Taisei Miyamoto
Portrayed by: Katsunori Takahashi (1999 film, 1999–2004 drama), Masaru Nagai (2008–2010 drama), Nobuyuki Suzuki (2025 films)
A high school dropout and former bōsōzoku who retired to become a fisherman, but after he saved Morinosuke Yamato he was offered a job at Yamato Construction in the sales department.
Misuzu Yajima (矢島美鈴, Yajima Misuzu)
Voiced by: Atsuko Tanaka
Née Suenaga (末永). A high class woman who once had an affair with the late politician Seishirō Kuroda (黒田征四郎, Kuroda Seishirou). She still has strong political and financial connections and later becomes Kintaro's second wife.
Ryuta Yajima (矢島竜太, Yajima Ryuta)
The son of Kintaro and his late wife Akemi.
Mimi Suenaga (末永美々, Suenaga Mimi)
The daughter of Misuzu from her affair with Kuroda.
Akemi Yajima (矢島明美, Yajima Akemi)
Kintaro's first wife, a kind blind woman who dies giving birth to Ryuta.
Morinosuke Yamato (大和守之助, Yamato Morinosuke)
One of the many men that Kintaro saves. Chairman of Yamato Construction. He believes in Kintaro all the way.

== Media ==
=== Manga ===
Written and illustrated by Hiroshi Motomiya, Salary Man Kintaro was serialized in Shueisha's seinen manga magazine Weekly Young Jump from 1994 to 2002. Shueisha collected its chapters in 30 tankōbon volumes, released from December 8, 1994, to March 19, 2002.

In April 2005, the series started appearing as an online comic, and a sequel, titled Salary Man Kintaro: Money Wars-hen (サラリーマン金太郎 マネーウォーズ編), was serialized in Weekly Young Jump from November 11, 2005, to August 10, 2006. (Note: It was serialized in the magazine from its 49th issue of 2005 to the combined 37th–38th issue of 2006, released on November 11, 2005, and August 10, 2006, respectively.) Shueisha collected its chapters in four tankōbon volumes, released from April 19 to December 19, 2006.

A third series, titled Shin Salaryman Kintaro (新サラリーマン金太郎), started in Weekly Young Jump on January 15, 2009; an additional series, titled Shin Salary Man Kintaro Junfudō (新サラリーマン金太郎 順不同; "New Salary Man Kintaro in no Particular Order"), started on April 1, 2010. Shueisha collected its chapters in seven tankōbon volumes, released from August 19, 2009, to March 18, 2011.

A fourth series, titled Salary Man Kintaro: 50-sai (サラリーマン金太郎 五十歳), was serialized in Weekly Young Jump from April 16, 2015, to February 10, 2016. Shueisha collected its chapters in four tankōbon volumes, released from July 17, 2015, to April 19, 2016.

The manga was digitally available in English on the NTT Solmare's ComicFriends Facebook app in 2012; the service closed in that same year. Manga Planet added the series to its digital service on August 3, 2020. It was added to the Crunchyroll Manga service in January 2026.

=== Live-action ===
==== Films ====
A live-action film adaptation premiered on November 13, 1999.

In September 2024, it was announced that two live-action films, directed by Ten Shimoyama, with scripts by Sinichi Tanaka, and starring Nobuyuki Suzuki as Kintaro Yajima, would premiere in Japan; the first film, Salaryman Kintaro Akatsuki-hen (サラリーマン金太郎【魁】編; "Salaryman Kintaro Dawn"), premiered on January 10, 2025, and Salaryman Kintaro Sakigake-hen (サラリーマン金太郎【魁】編; "Salaryman Kintaro Vanguard") premiered on February 7 of the same year.

==== Drama ====
A television drama adaptation, starring Katsunori Takahashi as Kintaro Yajima, was broadcast on TBS. The first season was broadcast for 11 episodes from January 10 to March 21, 1999. A second 12-episode season was broadcast from April 9 to July 2, 2000. A third 11-episode season was broadcast from January 6 to March 17, 2002. A fourth 10-episode season was broadcast from January 15 to March 18, 2004.

Another drama series, starring Masaru Nagai as Kintaro, was broadcast on TV Asahi. The first season was broadcast for 10 episodes from October 10 to December 12, 2008. A second 10-episode season was broadcasr from January 8 to March 12, 2010.

=== Anime ===
A 20-episode anime television series adaptation, animated by JCF, was broadcast on BS-i from February 18 to March 18, 2001. The opening theme, "Jikū: Toki no Sora" (時空～ときのそら～; "A Space of Time"), was performed by Yumi Matsuzawa, while the ending theme, "Heaven: Boku no Naka no Tengoku" (Heaven～僕の中の天国～; "We're in Heaven") was performed by Norishige Takahashi.

In North America, the series was licensed by Arts Magic. It was released on five DVDs from May 31, 2005, to March 28, 2006.

== Reception ==
The manga has had over 35 million copies in circulation.
