= Tenchi wo Kurau II: Shokatsu Kōmei Den =

1991 video game

Tenchi wo Kurau II
- Box art of Tenchi wo Kurau II
- Developer: Capcom
- Publisher: Capcom
- Composer: Yasuaki Fujita
- Series: Tenchi wo Kurau
- Platform: Famicom
- Release: JP: April 5, 1991
- Genre: Role-playing
- Mode: Single-player

Tenchi wo Kurau II: Shokatsu Kōmei Den (Note: Japanese: 天地を喰らうII 諸葛孔明伝, Hepburn: "The Devouring of Heaven and Earth II: The Story of Kong Ming") is a role-playing video game released in Japan by Capcom for the Famicom in 1991. It is the sequel to Destiny of an Emperor, originally based upon the manga Tenchi wo Kurau by Hiroshi Motomiya.

== Story ==
The game starts when Liu Bei was taking refuge with Cao Cao due to Lü Bu's attack. After Cao Cao defeated Lü Bu, Yuan Shu declared himself emperor and Liu Bei was sent to defeat him.

== Gameplay ==
Before this battle, player has to assemble some battle formation tactics. The third character is always the first to step forward into combat. The team's ability will change depending on his tactics.

As in other traditional console role-playing games, the player controls a party and takes them to different locations following the story. The party enters battles either from random encounters or from fixed boss battles and winning the battle will give experience points, money and items to the party.

The party can have up to seven members and of which one can act as the tactician and five members can join in a battle. The tactician will determine the list of tactics available for use in a battle. Using tactics will use up tactics points and provide various effects similar to magic commands common in medieval fantasy role-playing games. The pool of tactics points is shared by all members of the party, instead of having separate pool for each member.

There are many improvements to this game. The player no longer needs to take rations, allowing the player to explore the map longer before returning to a town. When a piece of equipment is equipped, it will show up on the equipment list, freeing up the space so that another item can be carried. One space in the item list can carry up to nine of the same item.

The player cannot teleport to previous visited city and most area are cut off by rivers which the player crosses on ships only when the story permits, allowing the story in early part of the game follows closely to the source instead of the ability to take branching paths in the previous game. The capturing system in the previous game is removed and characters join the party following the story line. Once they joined, their maximum soldier count, which act as hit points in this game as well as affecting the result of a physical attack to the enemy, increases with the current level of the party. The maximum in this game is 9999.

The battle system remained mostly the same as the previous game. A new feature is the battle formation tactics, which the player can use during battle. Once used, the members in the party will line up to form a pattern which provides stat bonus and special effects. When the player use certain tactics, the player can choose to target a single enemy or all enemies, with reduced strength. Each member in the party is specialized in one of the five weapon groups and they are sword, sabre, bow, axe and spear. The ultimate weapons are QingGang sword, ZhengZong sabre, LiGuang bow, Thunder axe and Snake spear.
