= Tenchi wo Kurau =

Japanese manga series

- Cover of the first volume

天地を喰らう
- Manga
- Written by: Hiroshi Motomiya
- Published by: Shueisha
- Magazine: Weekly Shōnen Jump
- Original run: June 7, 1983 – August 21, 1984
- Volumes: 7

Tenchi wo Kurau (Japanese: 天地を喰らう; 'The Devouring of Heaven and Earth') is a Japanese manga series written and illustrated by Hiroshi Motomiya. It is a fictionalized retelling of China's Three Kingdoms period with fantasy elements.

== Plot ==
Liu Bei is a descendant of Liu Sheng, prince Jing of Zhongshan of the Han dynasty. Cao Cao is the adopted grandchild of Cao Teng, a eunuch in the palace. Sun Jian is the governor of Jiangdong. The three show their marvelous leading-role to divide China to three states: Shu, Wei and Wu.

A significant difference is the use of fantasy elements; for example, many villains in the beginning are monsters as opposed to humans. Liu Bei meets a beautiful giant heavenly being in heaven, and she gives him the power to conquer the country. He meets and swears to be brothers with Guan Yu and Zhang Fei.

== Video games ==
The manga has the following video game adaptations published by Capcom:

Arcade video games

- Dynasty Wars (Tenchi o Kurau)
- Warriors of Fate (Tenchi o Kurau 2: Sekiheki no Tatakai)

Famicom/NES games

- Destiny of an Emperor (Tenchi o Kurau)
- Tenchi o Kurau II: Shokatsu Kōmei Den

Game Boy games

- Tenchi o Kurau

Super Famicom games

- Tenchi o Kurau: Sangokushi Gunyuuden
