= Warriors of Fate =

1992 video game

- Arcade flyer
- Developer: Capcom
- Publisher: Capcom
- Series: Tenchi wo Kurau
- Platforms: Arcade, CPS Changer, PlayStation, Sega Saturn
- Release: October 31, 1992: Arcade; WW: October 31, 1992 CPS Changer; JP: 1994 PlayStation; JP: March 22, 1996 Saturn; JP: September 6, 1996
- Genres: Beat 'em up, hack and slash
- Modes: Single-player, multiplayer
- Arcade system: CP System Dash

Warriors of Fate, known in Japan as Tenchi wo Kurau 2: Sekiheki no Tatakai, (Note: Japanese: 天地を喰らう2 赤壁の戦い, Hepburn: "The Devouring of Heaven and Earth II: Battle of Red Cliffs") is a 1992 beat 'em up video game developed and published by Capcom for arcades. It is the second video game based on the Tenchi wo Kurau manga, following 1989's Dynasty Wars. It was ported to the Sega Saturn and PlayStation in 1996. Capcom later included an emulated version of the arcade original as part of Capcom Arcade Stadium and Capcom Beat 'Em Up Bundle.

== Gameplay ==
Arcade single-player gameplay, showing Gi En/Wei Yan (who is renamed to Abaka in the World version) riding on a horse and fighting the halberd-wielding boss Jo Kō/Xu Huang (who is named Kai'Bataar here) and a few of his minions in the 8th stage - "Battle of Red Cliff 2", the pre-last level of the game.

Warriors of Fate is a beat 'em up with nine stages. Each contains large mobs including spearman, archers, strongmen, bomb-wielding opponents, and at least one boss. There can be up to three players on-screen at the same time. Using two buttons, Attack and Jump, the characters all have standard moves typical of Capcom side-scrollers of the day. One or more of Wei's generals appears at the end of each stage as a boss - e.g., Li Dian, Xiahou Dun, Xu Chu, Cao Ren, Zhang Liao, Xu Huang, and the infamous Lu Bu as the final boss. After defeating them all, Cao Cao himself must be confronted and defeated before he escapes. The game also has two bonus stages that require rapid pressing of buttons.

There is also a variety of weapons in the game which can be picked up. As with most side-scrollers, food is used to replenish health and can be found in various breakable containers in the game levels. One notable feature of the game is the ability to summon a warhorse which adds more attacks to the characters, generally involving pole-arms (except the long bow for Huang Zhong). Each character except Zhao Yun was given a special wrestling throw of their own. Unlike the first game, Dynasty Wars, Liu Bei is not playable. The playable characters are Guan Yu, Zhang Fei, Zhao Yun, Huang Zhong, four of the famous Five Tiger Generals, and Wei Yan (in the US version, they are named Portor, Kassar, Subutai, Kadan, and Abaka respectively).

== Story ==
In the Japanese version, Tenchi wo Kurau II follows Liu Bei's plight in Jingzhou from the Romance of the Three Kingdoms, a history-based 14th century novel from China by Luo Guanzhong, set in the Three Kingdoms period as Cao Cao sets to invade his lands after the death of Dong Zhuo and recruiting his general Lu Bu to his army. In Warriors of Fate, Shu Han, led by Liu Bei, as in the novel, is everything "good" and "righteous", while Wei, led by the ever-suspicious and cunning Cao Cao, is portrayed as "evil" and "bad". Liu Bei's warriors begin by fighting Cao Cao's forces at the Battle of Bowang, then Battle of Changban, then finally join up with Sun Quan to fight at the Battle of Red Cliff. If the Five Tigers slay Cao Cao, Wu and Shu join forces, unite Wei, return the Han back to rule and restore peace; if not, Cao Cao escapes and history continues as intended with the land in turmoil and the eventual demise of Shu or letting Cao Cao retreat by not killing him and the history continue just like the novel.

In the English adaptation, however, the Three Kingdoms theme was lost, and most names have been changed to names of Mongolian origin. The story takes place in a fictional realm where the evil overlord Akkila-Orkhan (originally Cao Cao) of Shang-Lo tries to conquer his neighbouring countries, converting them into ruin and despair. Kuan-Ti (originally Liu Bei), with the aid of the five great warriors, stands up against the conquering shadow and fights to defend his people and lands.

== Reception ==
In Japan, Game Machine listed Warriors of Fate in their December 15, 1992, issue as being the most-popular arcade game at the time. In North America, RePlay reported Warriors of Fate to be the fifth most-popular arcade game at the time. Play Meter also listed Warriors of Fate to be the forty-fifth most-popular arcade game at the time.
