= Strider (1989 NES video game) =

1989 video game

- Developer: Capcom
- Publisher: Capcom
- Designer: Masayoshi "Patariro" Kurokawa
- Composer: Harumi Fujita
- Platform: Nintendo Entertainment System
- Release: NA: July 1989
- Genre: Action-adventure
- Mode: Single-player

Strider is a 1989 action-adventure game developed and published by Capcom for the Nintendo Entertainment System. While the development of the NES version of Strider was produced in tandem with the arcade version, the Japanese version for the Famicom was never released. The NES version of Strider is included in the 2006 Game Boy Advance compilation Capcom Classics Mini-Mix.

== Plot ==
Set in a dystopian future during the year 2048, the game centers around a secret organization of hi-tech ninja-like operatives known as the "Striders", who specialize in various kinds of wetworks such as smuggling, kidnapping, demolitions, and disruption. The player takes control of Hiryu, the youngest ever elite-class Strider in the organization. Hiryu is summoned by the organization's second-in-command, Vice Director Matic, to assassinate his friend Kain, who has been captured by hostile forces and has become a liability to the Striders. Instead of killing him, Hiryu decides to rescue Kain from his captors; he is successful, and also recovers a recording from Kain concerning a suspected criminal plot. With the help of his fellow Strider Sheena, Hiryu uncovers a conspiracy between a certain faction of the Strider organization and an unknown organization known simply as the "Enterprise" (headed by a man named Faceas Clay) which involves the development of a mind-control weapon codenamed "Zain". In the course of finding and destroying these Zain units, Hiryu learns that the faction of conspirators is headed by Vice Director Matic himself. Hiryu eventually tracks Matic to an orbiting space station where the two Striders face off; after a brief battle Hiryu bests Matic and kills him. Afterwards Hiryu locates and destroys the last of the Zain units, Mother Zain.

In the epilogue, it is revealed that though Hiryu was asked to return to the Strider organization he instead opted to retire. The final credits show him discarding his weapon and walking away.

== Gameplay ==
Hiryu attacks an enemy soldier in Kazakh after exiting a one-way transport tube.

This iteration of Strider differs from the arcade version in that the player must find clues and items to progress. The game opens on the Striders' base of operations, the Blue Dragon, which transports Hiryu to various areas across the world. At the beginning of the game only Kazakh is available, but eventually the player unlocks Egypt, China, and Africa, among others, by collecting disks. These disks contain information pertinent to the plot, provided by several characters who often also grant Hiryu new abilities. New abilities unlock previously impassable areas, forcing the player to backtrack to obtain new items and disks. To return to the Blue Dragon, the player must return to the beginning of the area and jump against the uppermost left edge of the screen.

All the areas in Strider feature elevator-like transport tubes which the player can enter from below (by jumping) or above (by crouching). The player will then be moved along the path of the tube until they reach the exit. Tubes may or may not allow the player to enter from both ends; it is possible for a tube to send the player back to a much earlier part of the level, or even a different level entirely, with no convenient way to return.

Hiryu's main weapon is his Cypher, a plasma-generating blade with a tonfa-like handle known as the Falchion which he uses to slash enemies or stab them from below by raising it into the air. In some areas of the game, it is necessary, but difficult to leap off walls ("Triangle Jump") in order to access areas otherwise impossible to reach. Hiryu's strength level will increase after he accomplishes certain mission objectives (such as capturing enemy officers), which extends his health and energy meters, the latter of which enables him to use acquired skills. These skills include attacks, health recovery, or the ability to warp back instantly to the Blue Dragon. Another technique available is the possibility to fire a "Plasma Arrow" (a type of projectile attack) by raising his sword, known as "The Cipher", and keeping it upraised until it flashes; at that point the bolt can be shot with the attack button.

The player can use passwords to keep track of their progress. Of particular note, each time the player requests a password, the game ends with a brief description of the game's progress so far (which depends on Hiryu's current level) and gives a title for Hiryu's next adventure, similar to a television series or anime.

== Development ==
The NES version of Strider was conceived as part of a three-way collaboration between Capcom and manga studio Moto Kikaku, which also included the Strider Hiryu manga by Moto Kikaku's Tatsumi Wada that was published in Kodansha's Comic Computique anthology and a separately developed coin-operated video game version. Unlike the arcade game, the NES version of Strider closely follows the same storyline depicted in the Strider Hiryu manga, which involves Hiryu fighting against his former Strider allies. The Family Computer (Famicom) version of Strider Hiryu was first announced while the manga version was still in serialization and was scheduled to be released in Japan following the collected edition of the Strider Hiryu manga in the fourth quarter of 1988. However, the Famicom version was delayed to a 1989 release before it was eventually canceled. The NES game was still localized for the North American market and released shortly after the arcade game in 1989.

For their package art, Capcom contracted game illustrator Marc Ericksen's vision of Strider Hiryu wielding his Plasma powered Cipher against an enemy guard and his bayonet equipped AK-47, against a backdrop of Russian inspired architecture of the sort found in the gameplay. There, decorative Red Star motifs shared the stage with minaret style domes prominently suggesting the St. Basil's Cathedral in Red Square, Moscow, also employed by the illustrator for his rendition of Tengen's Tetris, in 1988. The Soviet Union, at that time 3 years from collapse, was selected only as the visual inspiration for the "Enterprise" empire by the design team staging the packaging design.

== Manga ==
Before the release of the Strider arcade game, Comic Comptiq (a monthly manga anthology published by Kadokawa Shoten) serialized a Strider Hiryū manga illustrated by Tatsumi Wada from its May to October issues in 1988. A single collected volume was published in November of the same year. The manga features the same characters and basic plot that was later used for the NES version, but with several differences to how the story transpires (for example, whereas Strider Kain dies before the final stage in the NES game, he manages to survive in the manga version). In addition to the six main chapters, an uncollected chapter titled Strider Hiryū Gaiden (ストライダー飛竜外伝) was published after the main series was completed. The additional chapter depicts the circumstances involving the death of Hiryu's sister, Mariya.

== Reception ==
Reception

Review scores
Publication	Score
Dragon	4/5
Electronic Gaming Monthly	7/10, 8/10, 7/10, 7/10
VideoGame	5/5

Strider on Nintendo Entertainment System was met with positive reception from critics, though some said the game does not capture the arcade version of the game well, making it nearly an entirely different game from its arcade counterpart.

Over the years, Strider on NES has been included on top lists from several outlets. Topless Robot's Todd Ciolek ranked its ending as #5 in their "Top 10 Most Depressing NES Game Ending". Nintendo Power ranked Strider #162 in the list of "Top 285 Nintendo Games of All Time" on their final issue. Arcade Sushi's Jon Ledford ranked its intro cinematic as #8 in their "10 Best NES Intros".
