= Strider 2 (1999 video game) =

- Japanese arcade flyer
- Developer: Capcom
- Publisher: Capcom: PAL: Virgin Interactive (PS)
- Producer: Noritaka Funamizu
- Designers: Harumaru; Nezumi Otoko; Shoei Okano
- Composers: Setsuo Yamamoto; Etsuko Yoneda
- Platforms: Arcade, PlayStation
- Release: Arcade: JP: December 13, 1999; PlayStation: JP: February 24, 2000; NA: July 26, 2000; EU: December 15, 2000
- Genres: Hack and slash, platform
- Mode: Single-player
- Arcade system: Sony ZN-2

Strider 2, released in Japan as Strider Hiryū 2 (ストライダー飛竜２, Sutoraidā Hiryū Tsū), and then as Strider Hiryū 1&2 (ストライダー飛竜1&2, Sutoraidā Hiryū Wan & Tsū), is a 1999 hack and slash game developed and published by Capcom for arcades. The game is a direct sequel to the original Strider and the second sequel to Strider produced, following U.S. Gold's 1990 noncanonical Strider II (Journey from Darkness: Strider Returns in North America), a game with which Capcom was not directly involved. The Capcom-produced Strider 2 makes no references to the Western-only Strider Returns/Strider II. The game was released for arcades in 1999 and was ported to the PlayStation in 2000.

== Development ==
A Capcom artist known as Harumaru redesigned the character for Strider 2, inspired by American comics she had found at a bookshelf of the Design Office (among them DC Comics, Mike Mignola, Simon Bisley, and Spawn by Todd McFarlane). Hiryu's redesign for this game first appeared in 1998 crossover fighting game Marvel vs. Capcom: Clash of Super Heroes.

== Gameplay ==
Screenshot from the arcade version showing Strider Hiryu attacking an enemy.

While the graphics in Strider 2 now consist of 2D character sprites overlaid over 3D backgrounds, its gameplay remains similar to its 2D side-scrolling predecessor. The controls consists of an eight-way joystick and three action buttons. The playable character Strider Hiryu can now perform new actions in addition to the ones he had in the first game. Hiryu can walk, jump, crouch, slide, and climb walls and ceilings like he would in the original game, as well as dash by pushing the joystick left or right twice, do a double jump by pressing jump in mid-air, and do a backward somersault jump while sliding. When climbing a wall, Hiryu can perform a thrust jump by holding the joystick away from the wall and pressing the Jump button. Added to his regular sword attack, Hiryu can now do a "Savage Slash" technique in mid-air by pressing the joystick down and up in mid-air. In addition to the Attack and Jump buttons, the player can power-up their character by pressing the "Boost" button if they have at least one Boost item in stock. While in Boost mode, Hiryu can shoot Plasma Waves with his sword for a limited period until the Boost gauge under Hiryu's life gauge runs out. Throughout the game, the player can pick up power-up items such as health replenishments and extensions, a cypher extension, and additional boosts. The player can obtain various miscellaneous point items based on other Capcom games, such as the Yashichi and the Sakichi symbols from Vulgus and the "zenny" coins from Black Tiger and Forgotten Worlds, that will increase the player's score.

The coin-op version of Strider 2 consists of five stages or missions, each with a different objective that is explained to the player beforehand. The first three missions can be played in any order the player wishes to undertake them, and are set in different locations on Earth (Hong Kong, Germany, Antarctica). The final two stages take place in the Flying Battleship Balrog and the space station Third Moon, both of which were locations in the original Strider.

== Plot ==
Around 2000 years after his defeat in the original game, the mysterious Grandmaster has returned once again to finish his plans and claim total control over the world. However, Strider Hiryu, a Strider carrying the same codename of the man who slew the Grandmaster in the past, has also surfaced. According to Capcom, this version of Hiryu is a clone of the original Hiryu created by the Strider organization in order to reincarnate Hiryu back from the dead. As one of the last survivors after the Striders were wiped out, he carries the mission to destroy the Grandmaster once and for all.

== Home version ==
A home version of Strider 2 was released for the PlayStation in 2000 (a simple port, given the PlayStation's similarity to the arcade's Sony ZN-2 board), which was released as a 2-disc set, with a second disc devoted to a direct port of the original Strider arcade game.

Finishing both games and saving the achievements on the same memory card unlocks a secret level in Strider 2: "Mission 00", a waterfall stage. Completion of all missions unlocks the former Strider Hien as a playable character, who wields two ranged cyphers; completion of the game using Hien unlocks the Boost skill for unlimited use in the game's menu.

== Reception ==
Reception

Aggregate score
Aggregator	Score
Metacritic	69/100

Review scores
Publication	Score
AllGame	3.5/5
Edge	7/10
Electronic Gaming Monthly	6.33/10
Famitsu	30/40
Game Informer	6.5/10
GameFan	89%
GamePro	3.5/5
GameRevolution	C
GameSpot	8/10
IGN	8.5/10
Official U.S. PlayStation Magazine	3.5/5

In Japan, Game Machine listed Strider 2 on their March 1, 2000 issue as being the fifth most-successful arcade game of the month.

The PlayStation version of Strider 2 received "average" reviews according to the review aggregation website Metacritic. James Mielke, writing for GameSpot, called it "a deliberate throwback to the arcade-dominant '80s" and "an excellent starter kit for the uninitiated, but for veterans of the series, it's like dinner without the dessert." David Zydrko of IGN described it as "a must-have package for fans of arcade-style action games", adding, "if you don't mind the fact that it's a very short game, you owe it to yourself to add this game to your collection." In Japan, Famitsu gave it a score of 30 out of 40.
