= Strider Hiryu =

Protagonist of the Strider series

- Strider character
- Strider Hiryu in Ultimate Marvel vs. Capcom 3
- First appearance: Strider Hiryu manga (1988)
- First game: Strider (1989)
- Created by: Capcom and Moto Kikaku
- Designed by: Tatsumi Wada (Strider Hiryu); Shoei (Strider (arcade)); Harumaru (Strider 2); Bengus (Marvel vs. Capcom)
- Voiced by: English: T. J. Storm (Marvel vs. Capcom series); Marc Biagi (Strider (2014)); Mike Willette (Strider (2014; combat voice-over)); Japanese: Kaneto Shiozawa (Strider (PC Engine)); Kōsuke Toriumi (Strider 2, Capcom X (Namco X Capcom, Project X Zone 2) series); Yūji Ueda (Marvel vs. Capcom series)

In-universe information
- Fighting style: Taijutsu and swordsmanship

Strider Hiryu (ストライダー飛竜, Sutoraidā Hiryū) is a fictional character jointly created by the video game company Capcom and manga collective Moto Kikaku. He debuted in a 1988 manga developed alongside separate arcade and home console games. Hiryu subsequently became the recurring protagonist of Capcom's Strider series and a playable representative of the company in the Marvel vs. Capcom fighting games.

Hiryu is portrayed as an elite agent of the Striders, an organisation of futuristic ninja-like operatives. His recurring visual identifiers include his face mask, red scarf and plasma-generating sword, the Cypher. Although his history and personality vary among the manga and game continuities, his principal video game portrayals characterise him through terse dialogue, speed and acrobatic movement. Developers of later games regarded his movement and responsiveness as essential parts of the character's identity.

Hiryu has appeared in relatively few dedicated Strider games, but remained visible through crossover works during lengthy intervals between starring roles. His visual design and agility have received praise, while retrospectives have discussed his unusual multimedia origin, development into a recognisable Capcom character and association with the Marvel vs. Capcom series.

== Concept and creation ==
=== Multimedia origins ===
Hiryu originated from a collaboration between Capcom and Moto Kikaku. Representatives of the two companies first established a common protagonist, organisation, setting and broad premise, after which separate teams developed a manga, an arcade game and a game for the Famicom. Moto Kikaku produced the manga, written by Tetsuo Shiba and illustrated by Tatsumi Wada, while different Capcom teams developed the arcade and console games. The works shared Hiryu, the Strider organisation and their near-future setting, but were otherwise created independently.

Arcade game planner Kouichi Yotsui advocated using a ninja protagonist because the concept allowed a broad range of visually legible actions, but wanted to avoid a conventional historical setting. The view of modern skyscrapers from the room where the collaborators met contributed to the decision to place the ninja-derived character in the future. Hiryu's mechanical animal companions were partly inspired by the trope of animals assisting ninja in Japanese comics, particularly Sanpei Shirato's Kamui Gaiden, and by the satellite-like support units found in contemporary shooting games.

The medium of each project affected Hiryu's portrayal. The manga provided him with a personal history, friendships and an emotional conflict with the Strider organisation. The related console game adapted much of that premise into an action adventure format. By contrast, the arcade team reduced the narrative and dialogue so that the action could proceed at the pace expected of a coin-operated game. Yotsui compared this form of compressed storytelling to poetry, explaining that behaviour, movement, scenery, music and changes in timing could suggest a larger narrative without extensive exposition.

Yotsui conceived traversal as central to the arcade incarnation. He wanted Hiryu to run along slopes, cling to walls and ledges and move continuously through irregular terrain using only a joystick and two action buttons. The climbing mechanic was partly informed by an incident in which Yotsui became stranded on the roof of Capcom's building and climbed down its exterior to reach a fire escape.

=== Visual identity ===
Across his principal appearances, Hiryu is depicted in a blue or dark-coloured suit and armed with the Cypher, a plasma blade with a handle resembling a tonfa. The original arcade version did not wear the long scarf later associated with the character. When Hiryu was adapted for Marvel vs. Capcom: Clash of Super Heroes, illustrator Bengus incorporated the mask and red scarf worn by the manga incarnation. This design was subsequently carried into Strider 2 and became a recurring part of Hiryu's silhouette.

Harumaru, the principal illustrator of Strider 2, developed his version from a concept proposed by fellow Capcom artist Shoei Okano: a protagonist with a mechanical, almost obsessive determination to complete any assigned mission. Harumaru distinguished this depiction from the more visibly human expression used for Hiryu in the Marvel vs. Capcom artwork. The game's high-contrast visual style was influenced by American comic books available in Capcom's design office, including works by Mike Mignola, Simon Bisley and Todd McFarlane.

Hiryu's appearances in the Marvel vs. Capcom crossover series became an important part of his later identity. Capcom attributed the production of Strider 2 partly to the positive response to his appearance in Clash of Super Heroes the previous year, particularly outside Japan, and identified subsequent crossover appearances as one factor in the character's 2014 revival.

Hiryu's limited speech was similarly treated as an established characteristic. Producer Andrew Szymanski described him as an operative focused on completing his mission rather than discussing political causes or explaining a personal philosophy. His dialogue was therefore restricted to short statements at significant moments, as the developers believed that making him verbose would undermine his established portrayal.

=== 2014 redesign ===
The developers of the 2014 title Strider treated it as a reimagining rather than a direct sequel. Producer Andrew Szymanski compared Hiryu with recurring fictional agents who can be reinterpreted for different eras while retaining a recognisable premise; in this case, Hiryu is repeatedly assigned to confront Grandmaster Meio without every appearance sharing a single continuity. Capcom and Double Helix Games drew on the original arcade games, Strider 2 and the Marvel vs. Capcom series while consulting veteran Capcom personnel about Hiryu's setting, appearance and characteristic movements. Elements adapted from the fighting games included his vertical launcher, poses and later silhouette, although the team reconstructed these features for the controls and environments of the new game rather than copying them directly.

Movement remained central to the redesign. Producer James Vance said that players remembered the older animation as faster and more fluid than it actually was, so the developers sought to reproduce that idealised impression through animation, input timing and responsiveness. The team refined Hiryu's running, jumping, sliding and wall-climbing before constructing environments around the distances and heights he could traverse. Animations that interrupted his momentum were revised or removed, including a stationary turning animation whose brief delay made him appear insufficiently responsive. Hiryu also begins with his established running, climbing, sliding and basic Cypher abilities rather than being artificially weakened, while later upgrades expand his combat and traversal options.

Visually, Hiryu's cloth costume was reinterpreted as segmented, rubber-like armour while retaining its established outline. His scarf became a stream of plasma particles whose colour reflected the active properties of the Cypher. The developers also preserved his hairstyle, mechanical climbing device, colour palette and the silhouette associated with his later Marvel vs. Capcom appearances so that the updated model remained immediately recognisable. Capcom artists, including personnel who had worked on Strider 2, supervised the designs produced with Double Helix.

== Appearances ==
Hiryu has appeared in several related but not completely continuous interpretations. The manga and related console game depict a former Strider drawn back into the organisation, while the arcade games and 2014 title portray a more taciturn operative sent to eliminate Grandmaster Meio. His crossover appearances generally use the visual identity developed through Marvel vs. Capcom and Strider 2.

=== In Strider media ===
Hiryu first appeared in the 1988 manga Strider Hiryu, written by Tetsuo Shiba and illustrated by Tatsumi Wada. The series was later collected as a single volume, and an additional story titled Strider Hiryu Gaiden depicts events preceding its central narrative. The manga presents Hiryu as a Special A-Class Strider who retires after being ordered to kill his sister when she turns against the organisation. He returns after another Strider is captured and subjected to mind control, leading him to investigate a conspiracy within the organisation.

The home console game uses the manga's characters and central mind-control storyline, but adapts them into an action adventure structure. The separately developed 1989 arcade game instead presents Hiryu as an active Strider sent to assassinate Grandmaster Meio, a dictator who has conquered the world. Its story is communicated through brief exchanges and action scenes, establishing the mission-focused incarnation used by most later games.

Capcom returned to the character in Strider 2, released for arcades in 1999 and later for the PlayStation. Set long after the original arcade game, it introduces a new incarnation of Hiryu who confronts the revived Meio and the former Strider Hien. Hiryu's visual redesign had already appeared in Marvel vs. Capcom: Clash of Super Heroes before the release of Strider 2.

Instead of continuing the narrative of previous games, 2014's Strider reconstructs the recurring conflict between Hiryu and Meio and incorporates characters, settings and concepts from the manga, console game, arcade titles and crossover appearances. The game follows Hiryu through Kazakh City as he acquires new Cypher properties and mechanical support abilities while pursuing Meio.

=== In crossover and related works ===
Hiryu made his fighting-game debut as a playable character in Marvel vs. Capcom: Clash of Super Heroes in 1998. His moveset adapts his Cypher attacks, robotic animal companions, climbing motions and acrobatic movement to a fighting-game format. He returned in Marvel vs. Capcom 2: New Age of Heroes, Ultimate Marvel vs. Capcom 3 and Marvel vs. Capcom: Infinite.

Hiryu also appears as a playable character in the tactical role-playing game Namco × Capcom. He later appears in Project X Zone 2, where he is partnered with Hotsuma from Sega's Shinobi series. Other crossover representations include the SNK vs. Capcom: Card Fighters Clash games and Capcom's digital card game Teppen.

== Reception and legacy ==
Hiryu received early recognition in Japan. In the third Gamest Grand Prix, conducted for games released in 1989, he placed third in the publication's best-character category.

Reviewers of the 2014 game identified movement as Hiryu's principal appeal. Maxwell McGee of GameSpot considered him exceptionally enjoyable to control, praising the transitions among running, sliding, climbing and attacking and the precision with which the player could move through the environment. McGee also noted that Hiryu's bright design and red scarf distinguished him from the predominantly industrial setting. David Roberts of GamesRadar+ similarly praised the speed and immediacy of Hiryu's attacks, and considered the character's direct pursuit of his mission an effective source of momentum despite the game's sparse plot. Reviewing the 2014 title, Shinichi Yamoto of 4Gamer called Hiryu a taciturn professional whose calm behaviour contrasted with the advanced weapons and exaggerated enemies surrounding him. Yamoto considered the sight of Hiryu destroying futuristic machinery with the Cypher both violent and visually elegant. Yamoto concluded that the new design retained the character's strength, speed, silence and recognisable style despite altering his costume and the structure of the game.

Retrospective coverage has frequently associated Hiryu's characterisation with his visual design and movement. In a 2000 retrospective, Edge praised the combination of his appearance and agility as an especially effective character design. Zenji Ishii of Famitsu described him as a modern reinterpretation of the ninja archetype, retaining its intimidating and heroic qualities while replacing a historical appearance with contemporary clothing and technology. Ishii considered the variety of angled surfaces, wall climbing, inverted gravity and acrobatic movement in the original game essential to how Hiryu and his world were communicated. IGN's Travis Fahs described Hiryu as one of Capcom's best-loved characters and considered his visual identity and abilities to possess lasting appeal. Fahs nevertheless argued that Capcom had repeatedly struggled to determine how to use him, resulting in long periods between starring games despite maintaining his presence in crossovers. A GamesBeat retrospective similarly contrasted the strong impression made by Hiryu's original appearance with the small number of dedicated Strider games released during the following 25 years. Writing retrospectively in 2025, Zack Fornaca of Nintendojo observed that Hiryu had appeared in more crossover works than games bearing the Strider name and regarded the Marvel vs. Capcom version as his most recognisable modern representation.

GamesRadar+ included Hiryu among Capcom's best characters, highlighting the combination of science-fiction ninja imagery, the Cypher, climbing equipment and robotic animal companions. The publication separately observed that his later crossover appearances provided the character with renewed visibility after his starring games had become infrequent.
