= Share =

Share may refer to:

- related to sharing, the joint use of a resource or space
- Share (finance), a unit of equity ownership in the capital stock of a corporation

Share may also refer to:

== Arts, entertainment and media ==
- Share (2015 film), a short drama film
- Share (2019 film), a feature drama film
- Share (newspaper), a newspaper in Toronto, Canada
- Ratings share, a media audience measure by Nielsen Media Research

== Computing ==
- share (command), a DOS command
- SHARE (computing), a user group for IBM mainframe computers
  - SHARE Operating System
- Share (P2P), a Japanese P2P computer program, the successor to Winny

== Organizations ==
- share (company), a German consumer goods brand
- SHARE Cancer Support, a New York City organization supporting women with cancer
- SHARE Foundation, promoting the development of El Salvador
- Share Foundation, a medical charity in Newfoundland
- SHARE in Africa, an American charity organization
- Share International, a religious movement founded by British painter Benjamin Creme
- Skeptics and Humanist Aid and Relief Effort, or SHARE, a charity arm of the Center for Inquiry
- Students Harness Aid for the Relief of the Elderly (SHARE), a charity in Cork, Ireland

== Other uses ==
- Share, Kwara, a town in Nigeria
- Southern Hemisphere Auroral Radar Experiment (SHARE), an Antarctic research project
- Survey of Health, Ageing and Retirement in Europe (SHARE), a health and social study in Europe

== See also ==
- Cher (disambiguation)
- Plowshare, the cutting blade of a plow (plough)
- Ridesharing (disambiguation)
- Shared (disambiguation)
- Timeshare (disambiguation)
