= Falafel (disambiguation) =

Falafel is a food.

Falafel may also refer to:

- Falafel (film)
- Nickname of the backgammon player Matvey Natanzon
- Olaf Falafel, British comedian and children's author
- Falafel Inc., fast casual Middle Eastern restaurant chain in the Washington metropolitan area
