= X-Men: Gamesmaster's Legacy =

1995 video game

- North American box art by Ken Steacy
- Developer: Sega of America
- Publisher: Sega
- Producer: Jerry Markota
- Designer: Jerry Markota
- Programmer: Paul Hutchinson
- Artist: Jerry Markota
- Writer: Jerry Markota
- Composer: Paul Hutchinson
- Platform: Game Gear
- Release: NA: February 16, 1995; EU: 1995
- Genre: Action
- Mode: Single-player

X-Men: Gamesmaster's Legacy is an action game released in 1995 on the Game Gear. The game starts off with Cyclops and Storm as playable X-Men, although Wolverine, Gambit, Rogue, Bishop, Jean Grey, and Cable can be later unlocked. It is loosely based on the "Upstarts" and "X-Cutioner's Song" storylines that took place in the comics. It is the sequel to the original X-Men Game Gear game.

The following year, Sega released a follow-up, X-Men: Mojo World.

== Plot ==
The Legacy Virus is annihilating mutantkind and the Gamesmaster is holding the key. He offers the X-Men a chance to play his game and win the secret, but he also offers the same to their arch-enemies with the added satisfaction of destroying the X-Men. The X-Men must split up to find the cure or perish forever.

== Gameplay ==
The game is split up into two parts, with five stages in the first part where players rescue the missing gears, and three stages in the second part. The bosses include Siena Blaze, Shinobi Shaw, Trevor Fitzroy, Fabian Cortez, Exodus, Apocalypse, Mister Sinister, and Stryfe.

The character lineup for the game includes Cyclops, Storm, Wolverine, Gambit, Rogue, Bishop, Phoenix, and Cable (who is hidden in one of the Egyptian Base levels).

== Reception ==
Electronic Gaming Monthly deemed the game "a good sequel", praising the graphics, controls, and the increasing selection of X-Men as the game progresses. They gave it a 6.4 out of 10. GamePro particularly noted how the game was an improvement over the earlier Game Gear title Spider-Man and the X-Men in Arcade's Revenge, removing the frustrations of that game while featuring greatly improved graphics.
