= Shard =

Shard or sherd is a sharp piece of glass, pottery, or stone.

Shard may also refer to:

== Places ==
- Shard End, a place in Birmingham, United Kingdom

== Architecture ==
- Dresden Shard, a redesign of the Bundeswehr Military History Museum in Dresden, Germany
- The Shard, a skyscraper in London, United Kingdom

== Arts, entertainment, and media ==
- Shard (character), a character in the Marvel Comics universe
- Shards (EP), an EP by Tim Hecker
- Rex Shard, a character in SWAT Kats: The Radical Squadron
- "The Shard", a chapter in Mirror's Edge

== Science and technology ==
- Shard (database architecture), a method of horizontal partitioning in a database
- Elytron or shard, a forewing found on some insect species

== See also ==
- Lauren Bell (cricketer), nicknamed The Shard
- Shared (disambiguation)
