= Bishop (Marvel Comics) =

Marvel Comics superhero

- Cover art of Uncanny X-Men #6 (November 2024) by Tyler Kirkham

Publication information
- Publisher: Marvel Comics
- First appearance: The Uncanny X-Men #282 (November 1991)
- Created by: Whilce Portacio; John Byrne

In-story information
- Full name: Lucas Bishop
- Species: Human mutant
- Team affiliations: X-Men; X-Treme Sanctions Executive; Xavier's Security Enforcers; X-Treme X-Men; The Twelve; Marauders; Interpol; Office of National Emergency; NYPD
- Notable aliases: Red Bishop
- Abilities: Ability to instinctively know his present time and place; Energy absorption and redirection; Superhuman physical attributes; Poison resistance; Skilled armed and unarmed combatant; Skilled marksman

Lucas Bishop is a character appearing in American comic books published by Marvel Comics. Created by writer John Byrne and artist Whilce Portacio, the character first appeared in The Uncanny X-Men #282 (November 1991). Bishop belongs to a subspecies of human known as mutants, who are born with superhuman abilities. Bishop has the ability to absorb and redirect energy.

Bishop debuted as a member of a mutant police force known as the Xavier's Security Enforcers (XSE), from a dystopian future of the Marvel Universe known as Earth-1191. Travelling back in time to capture a fugitive, he remained behind and joined the X-Men, a team he idolised from legends in the future. The character is often involved in storylines involving time-travel, including the Age of Apocalypse and Messiah Complex. His sister, Shard, also appears in the comics as a member of the X.S.E. and X-Factor.

Since his original introduction in comics, the character has been featured in various other Marvel-licensed products, including video games, animated television series, and merchandise. Omar Sy portrayed Bishop in the 2014 live-action feature film X-Men: Days of Future Past.

== Creation ==
During an interview Whilce Portacio discussed the creation of the character:

Visually Bishop was my John Ford days, the blue and yellow that's why the scarf, that's why the blue and the yellow and the high officer riding boots, it was all Cavalry... and this was the last element the Jheri curls and you got to remember Prince was big back then.

According to Portacio, he originally intended for Bishop to be Filipino like himself, using Efren Reyes and Gary Valenciano as inspirations for the character. However, editor Bob Harras asked for Bishop to be black instead, as many African American children sent fan mail to the X-Men office and Harras wanted a hero who could inspire these readers. Portacio agreed, remarking "understanding as a minority, I couldn't say no. I was already operating in the mood of being Pinoy, diba? Learning about our ugali. And that's another part of it. Pagbigyan, diba? (give it up, right?) there's always another time."

== Publication history ==
=== 1990s ===
Bishop debuted in The Uncanny X-Men #282 (November 1991), created by Whilce Portacio and John Byrne. He appeared in the Bishop (1994–95) series, his first solo comic book series, in which he tracked and fought Mountjoy, in the 1995 X-Men: Alpha one-shot, the Onslaught: X-Men (June 1996) one-shot, XSE (November 1996-February 1997) series, which showcased his past (future), the sequel Bishop: Xavier's Security Enforcers (January–March 1998), his second solo comic book series, the eight-issue Gambit and Bishop: Sons of the Atom (2001) series, where he teamed up with Gambit to oppose Stryfe, and the Bishop: The Last X-Man (August 1999-January 2001) series, his third solo comic book series, in which he was trapped in another alternate timeline.

=== 2000s ===
Bishop appeared during the first volume of X-Treme X-Men (2001-2004), District X (2004–2005) series, a police procedural set in a mutant ghetto in New York City,, and its House of M counterpart, Mutopia X (2005-2006). He also featured during the X-Men: Messiah Complex crossover event, hunting Hope Summers and ending up stranded in the future. He featured in a three-issue miniseries titled X-Men: The Times and Life of Lucas Bishop (2009).

=== 2010s ===
Bishop reappears in Uncanny X-Force, and makes appearances in Uncanny X-Men and Astonishing X-Men, as well as the Age of X-Man event.

=== 2020s ===
Bishop appears throughout the comics of the Krakoan Age, notably in the Marauders series (2019-2022), the X-Men Legends series (2022–2023), and the Bishop: War College series (2023), his fourth solo comic book series. He also featured in the four-issue Children of the Vault miniseries (2023-2024) and Timeslide one-shot (2025), both alongside Cable. Bishop will appear in a five-issue limited series created by Saladin Ahmed and Mario Santoro.

== Fictional character biography ==
=== Early life ===
Bishop was born about 80 years in the future of the Marvel Universe. He was raised in a mutant concentration camp in the aftermath of the Summers Rebellion, an uprising in which mutants and humans joined forces to destroy the Sentinels. Bishop has a distinctive M brand over his right eye, used to identify mutants in his era. After his parents were killed, Bishop was taken in by a man named LeBeau, also called Witness, who was reportedly the last man to see the legendary X-Men alive. According to LeBeau, Bishop's adoptive grandmother took Bishop away from him. Bishop and his younger sister, Shard, were then subsequently raised by his grandmother within the same mutant concentration camp in Brooklyn.

Bishop's grandmother taught him many legends of the X-Men, who were old allies of hers. Depowered by unknown means, she had entered the camps in secret to raise her grandchildren. Upon her deathbed, she made Bishop swear to protect Shard. After the Rebellion, the mutants were "emancipated" and sent out of the camps to fend for themselves. Bishop and Shard, who were only children, were left alone. They lived on the streets, stealing to survive until coming under the care of a family friend, a war veteran named Hancock. Slightly blind, Hancock nevertheless took on the task of raising the two.

One day, Bishop encountered an anti-human group of mutants called the Exhumes, who took Shard hostage just before the XSE arrived. Until that time, Bishop had admired the Exhumes, attributing to them his proud, idealized notion of the legendary X-Men. It wasn't until the XSE defeated the Exhume and saved his sister that Bishop knew he wanted to join the XSE. When Bishop was 15, Hancock was murdered by criminals who were promptly arrested by the XSE, and he and Shard enlisted in their ranks. Shard soon surpassed Bishop to become the youngest XSE officer.

During a training class, Bishop's instructors and some of his fellow students were attacked and killed. Bishop rallied the survivors and led the struggle against the assailants until reinforcements arrived. Bishop gradually climbs the ranks of the XSE until finally becoming their commander.

While on a mission to wipe out a nest of Emplates, mutant vampires that feed on bone marrow, Shard was critically injured. Bishop went to Witness for help. Witness, then imprisoned at the New York Stark Fujikawa building, agreed to transfer Shard's essence into a holographic matrix if Bishop would work for him for one year. Bishop agreed, leaving the XSE for a time. The details of Bishop's work during this period are unknown; Bishop appears reticent on the subject, later refusing to tell Shard of his actions.

Immediately upon his re-installment as a commander in the XSE, Bishop and his XSE group the "Omega Squad" captured Trevor Fitzroy, a murderous ex-XSE trainee in the ruins of the Xavier Institute War Room. While there, Bishop discovered a damaged recording of Jean Grey, in which she spoke of a traitor destroying the X-Men from inside. Haunted by his discovery, Bishop confronts Witness for details, but receives only a vague, ambiguous response, leaving him to suspect his former master of being more than simply a witness to the downfall of the X-Men.

=== Joining the X-Men ===
Fitzroy escaped from prison and used a large amount of mutant life-force to open a time portal and break out 93 mutant criminal "Lifers" in the process. Bishop found himself in the past in the time of his heroes, the X-Men. Bishop and the Omega Squad eventually "sanctioned" the Lifers, but did not get Fitzroy. Bishop encountered the X-Men for the first time but did not believe that they were really the X-Men. He then battled them but later allied with the X-Men in trying to stop Fitzroy. Malcolm and Randall, the two members of his Omega Squad, died in the process. Professor Charles Xavier offered him a place in the X-Men, and he was placed under Storm's tutelage. He fought and defeated Styglut. When he met Gambit, Bishop recognized him as possibly a younger version of the Witness and fought him.

He soon met Mystique for the first time, and alongside the X-Men he battled the Morlocks and the Death Sponsors. Bishop assigned himself the role of Xavier's personal bodyguard, which he failed at when Stryfe, the evil double of Cable, critically wounded Xavier. Initially, the X-Men believed that Cable was the would-be assassin, so Wolverine and Bishop tracked down Cable, but then travelled to Cable's "Graymalkin" space station and joined with him in finding Stryfe. Citing his failure to protect Professor X, Bishop offered to resign from the X-Men. His resignation was rejected by Xavier, and then alongside the X-Men he battled the Acolytes.

=== Age of Apocalypse ===
When Professor Xavier's insane son, the mutant Legion, went back in time to assassinate Magneto, Bishop was one of the X-Men sent to stop him. When they failed and Legion accidentally killed Professor Xavier, Bishop was the only time-traveler to remain when history was altered and became the Age of Apocalypse. He eventually convinced the Magneto of that era that the existence of this reality was wrong, and with a great amount of sacrifice, managed to correct the error and stop Legion. After the timeline reset itself, Bishop received some of his counterpart's unsettling memories of the Age of Apocalypse.

The traitor in the X-Men was eventually revealed to be Professor X in the form of Onslaught. Bishop's knowledge of the future was the only thing that stopped Onslaught from killing the X-Men. As Onslaught fired a massive blast of psionic energy at the distracted X-Men, Bishop threw himself in front of them and absorbed the blast that would have killed them. Onslaught, winded from such a massive attack, said that his blast was enough to kill a thousand mutants and "Another time, another place, I would have been proud". Bishop lost consciousness after absorbing the blast but soon recovered, although it was not enough to prevent Onslaught from nearly destroying all of humanity. He made peace with Gambit, who was not the traitor after all.

Following this, Bishop was captured by Trevor Fitzroy's henchmen and taken to a distant possible future, detailed in the Bishop: The Last X-Man series. He again faced Fitzroy, with Bishop eventually killing him. He was temporarily returned to the present by Apocalypse who needed him as one of The Twelve, before finally returning permanently during the Maximum Security crossover.

=== X-Treme X-Men ===
Bishop was a founding member of Storm's splinter team of X-Men, whose mission was to search for the Books of Truth, the diaries of the precognitive mutant Destiny. They left against the will and knowledge of the main team, as the splinter group did not trust in Xavier or the others to use the diaries for the benefit of humanity.

=== District X ===
Bishop joined the Federal Bureau of Investigation. District X, or 'Mutant Town', had a high-population density. It was also a poverty-stricken area with high crime rates. Bishop was assigned to the area to resolve mutant-related crimes.

=== Civil War ===
In the Civil War: X-Men miniseries, Bishop sides with the Office of National Emergency to bring in the X-Men and the 198. He argues with Cyclops over allowing their escape and states his fear of what the future might hold. Valerie Cooper and Tony Stark let Bishop lead Micromax and Sabra into action against Domino, Shatterstar, and the rest of the 198. Bishop led them to the base where the 198 was hiding and told the X-Men to stand down upon their arrival. General Demetrius Lazer betrayed him by ensuring that Cyclops attacked Bishop. Though at first he simply absorbed it, the power was too much for him to control and he was overwhelmed. Bishop was forced to direct the energy he had absorbed upwards in a powerful blast that destroyed an O*N*E* Sentinel. He later teamed up with the X-Men to save the 198 from a bomb explosion and then went his own way, leaving the X-Men. Bishop was among Iron Man's pro-registration forces that guarded the Negative Zone prison. When Captain America's team breaks in, a fight ensues, putting Bishop at odds with his former teammates Storm and Cable.

=== Messiah Complex ===
In Messiah Complex, an event revitalized Bishop's timeline as a viable future: the birth of the first mutant child since M-Day. As the Marauders, on Mister Sinister's orders, try to gather anyone and anything with knowledge of the future, Bishop is the only target they were unable to locate and terminate. It is revealed that he had betrayed the X-Men and he attempted to kill the baby. Before he could succeed, he was thwarted by the Marauders, who escaped with the baby. As X-Men arrive on the scene, Bishop pretends to have attempted to retrieve the baby. As Multiple Man's duplicate and Layla Miller find out in their mission to one of the planet's possible futures (80 years in the future) that the birth of the child created, the child apparently kills a million people in an event dubbed the Six-Minute War, and the U.S. government incarcerates all the mutants into concentration camps, where Bishop is born, grows up, and sees his parents killed. As Multiple Man's dupe and Layla find out, Bishop wishes at a young age to have had the opportunity to kill the baby, so that while he would not be born, he would also not have to see his parents die, and to endure the horrors of life in the concentration camps. Layla kills the dupe so that the information conveyed to them by young Bishop can return to the present, to the Multiple Man prime, who conveys Bishop's treachery to the X-Men. The X-Men then attempted to alert X-Force of Bishop's betrayal, but he managed to block all of their communication channels. After arriving on Muir Island and fighting past the Marauders, Bishop found Cable attempting to escape with the baby and the two fight. Both mutants are then attacked by Predator X, who viciously rips off Bishop's right arm. Bishop cauterizes his torn shoulder on an unconscious Sunfire and in an attempt to shoot down a teleporting Cable, he misses and hits Professor X instead.

==== Chasing the Mutant Messiah ====
Bishop managed to escape the X-Men after he seemingly killed their mentor, and stole a nuclear powered bionic arm from Forge equipped with a timeslide device, which he uses to track down Cable and the newborn mutant. Upon finding them, he shoots Cable twice before being hindered by a local gang. With Cable severely weakened by blood loss, he makes a risky attack before the gang can find heavier weapons. He later manages to track down Cable, slaying several mutated beasts in the process, and shoot the Mutant Messiah. He also finds that in the future generated by his choice, Cable will be always revered as a messianic figure who tried his best to protect the child and saved humanity from the very beasts that Bishop unwillingly saved Cable from. It has been revealed that the Messiah child is still alive and Bishop has been captured by the X-Men. In his efforts to kill the child, Bishop has left several traps for Cable throughout the timestream, killing millions in the process, though he does not see them as people who actually exist but as people who would not exist or come back to life if he kills Hope.

==== Messiah War ====
After multiple failings at killing Hope, Bishop locates and enlists the aid of Stryfe, promising him that he would aid him in killing Apocalypse and Cable. Stryfe and Bishop travel to a point in the future where Apocalypse is at his weakest and manage to defeat him. Stryfe builds an empire using Celestial technology and Bishop becomes his right-hand man, waiting for Cable and Hope to re-emerge. When they do appear along with X-Force, Hope is kidnapped. Bishop betrays Stryfe and his plot to kill Hope is foiled by Stryfe, who wants to make her his heir. Both attempts are foiled by Apocalypse, X-Force, and Cable. Cable manages to rescue Hope and escape yet again. Bishop escapes into the "near future" of the 21st century, reconstructing his arm, vowing to find Hope once again.

==== Homecoming ====
After several years of running from Bishop, Hope finally decides that it is time to return to the present. During a battle, Bishop manages to knock out Cable. In a fit of rage, Hope's powers awaken and render Bishop unconscious. Hope then attempts to kill Bishop, but is stopped by Cable. They take Bishop's time machine and leave him stranded. Bishop is somehow transported with them and begins chasing them through time, in an attempt to kill Hope before they reach the present. In Cable vol. 2 #24, Hope and Cable return to the present time but Bishop follows them. He attacks them, running Cable through with a sword. As Cable is incapacitated, Hope rushes to his aid but is ultimately overpowered by Bishop. Cable takes out Bishop's time-traveling device from his techno-organic arm, performs some alterations on it, and places it in Bishop's robotic arm. Cable recovers enough to toss Bishop into the subway. As Bishop attempts to kill Hope one last time, he is transported to a barren and dead Earth (as a result of his efforts to limit Cable and Hope's attempts to find allies and shelter through different time periods) with a red sun in the sky (cause unknown). Bishop, being overconfident, attempts to travel back to the present time to continue his quest to kill Cable and Hope Summers, but due to Cable sabotaging Bishop's time-traveling device, this attempt causes his robotic arm to explode. This leaves him stranded in the year 6700 A.D. Bishop is last shown thinking to himself concerning Cable and Hope, "I was as much a father to that girl as you were. Whatever she becomes, it's because of me. I was doing the right thing. Wasn't I?"

=== Return to the Present ===
In Uncanny X-Force vol. 2 #1, Bishop makes his first appearance since being stranded in the future. He is shown arriving in 2013 Los Angeles and announcing "I'm baaack!" He battles the members of the new X-Force before it is revealed that his mind is apparently being possessed by the Demon Bear that once terrorized Danielle Moonstar. After a lengthy conflict, Psylocke manages to pull the Bear out of Bishop's mind. Storm also uses the opportunity to disrupt the part of Bishop's mind holding his memories of his hunt for Hope, in the hopes that she will thus restore her old friend. Bishop is later shown comatose as a result of his ordeal.

He eventually regains his memories of Hope. The self-control he has learned during his time in the future helps him move past his former vendetta, even helping to save Hope's life when Stryfe attempted to manipulate them into attacking each other in revenge for their actions against him during their time-traveling search.

Bishop is shown carrying out research in a library in London, preparing himself for the next 'scheduled' threat he recalls from his future history, when he becomes caught up in the latest attack by the Shadow King, which results in Charles Xavier being reborn in Fantomex's body. After the reborn Proteus and Shadow King are defeated, Xavier—now calling himself 'X'—erases the memories of his resurrection from most of the X-Men who worked with him, but he grants each of them a gift, stating that his gift to Bishop is the ability to put his quest to protect the future to the side at times and allow himself to enjoy his life in the present.

Under the illusionary world, every type of human intimate interaction is forbidden, although this does not stop Bishop and Jean Grey from starting a relationship. This leads to the events of mini-series Prisoner X, where Bishop is taken to be "reconditioned".

=== Dawn of X and Krakoa ===
In the new status quo for the X-Men (Dawn of X), helmed by writer Jonathan Hickman, Bishop is part of the crew of the Marauders, led by Kitty Pryde, and becomes Red Bishop of the Hellfire Club. He is also one of Krakoa's Great Captains—alongside Cyclops, Magik, and Gorgon—before becoming Captain Commander when Cyclops steps aside to lead the X-Men. During King in Black, Beast was able to convince Bishop to ignore his orders from Pryde and shoot to kill the symbiote-infected Cyclops and Storm, hinting that he is fine with being used by different organizations against one another. He also suggested the idea of fusing mutant DNA into new forms—inadvertently arguing for chimeras, which became a major part of Moira MacTaggert's previous failed timelines.

== Powers and abilities ==
Bishop possesses energy absorption mutant powers. He can absorb all forms of radiant or conductive energy that are directed towards him and to release that energy from his body. This power is mostly passive, allowing Bishop to absorb energy at all times.

He can release this energy in many different forms, usually as concussive blasts of biokinetic energy, even amplified compared to the absorbed amount. Bishop can also store absorbed energy within his personal reserves, whereupon the energy increases his strength and recuperative abilities as well as affording him a measure of invulnerability. He is also able to absorb magic energy (as seen when fighting "growing men" in Limbo) and the psychic energies of psionics as easily as all the other kinds. This does not prevent him from being read or manipulated by a telepath but only sustains him and helps him to slow them down and potentially exhaust them. It has been clearly stated that Bishop is also able to absorb and process kinetic energy similarly to Sebastian Shaw, but in a much less effective way.

His powers make it difficult to harm him with energy-based attacks; however, he can become overloaded from absorbing too much energy, though his upper limits are unknown, even to himself; when Rogue was suffering a power overload after absorbing Skrull telepath Z'Cann, Bishop was pushed to his limit simply by grabbing Rogue as he tried to help her drain off her excess power. While he can achieve a sort of invulnerability, even against conventional attacks and depending on his energy reserves, some parts of at least the transformation process are also participatory, as for example after falling from a great height he transformed the kinetic energy into pure light and sound, but only could do so because he was conscious. Bishop is also resistant to most poisons.

He can "let his spirit go" as seen in X-Treme X-Men Annual #1. However, it was never clearly explained what this actually means and if this is also part of his powers or if it was taught to him.

He has also demonstrated the ability to instinctively know where he is and the present hour and date even if asleep, first mentioned in X-Treme X-Men #1. Although being the great-grandson of Gateway, a mutant possessing extensive dealings with time travel, this aspect is not one of Bishop's mutant powers. Bishop's explanation is that due to training; he knows where he is at all times.

Bishop is athletic, has many years of training in armed and unarmed combat, and is proficient in hand-to-hand fighting and marksmanship. When he first came to the modern era, he carried XSE guns from his own time that fired laser beams and plasma charges. He also wore his XSE uniform, modeled after X-Men uniforms, which included body armor.

For a significant period of time, his right arm was a prosthetic, stolen from Forge. A nuclear-powered battle-ready arm, it incorporates in its design a time-travel device, the ability to channel his energy blasts through, and enhanced strength and resilience. It has since been destroyed after Bishop tried to use it to time travel from 6700 A.D. to 2010 to kill Cable and Hope Summers due to Cable tampering with the time traveling device within it. His real arm has apparently been re-grown after he was healed in the future by the remnants of humanity.

== Reception ==
=== Critical response ===
Sara Century of Syfy described Bishop as one of the greatest X-Men of all time, saying, "Despite his flaws, there are many reasons to love Bishop." Jamie Lovett of ComicBook.com expressed interest in seeing a television series on Bishop.

=== Impact ===
In 2020, American rapper Method Man cosplayed Bishop. In 2021, he expressed interest in portraying the character in the Marvel Cinematic Universe (MCU).

== In other media ==
=== Television ===
- Bishop appears in X-Men: The Animated Series, voiced by Philip Akin. This version hails from the year 2055.
  - Bishop appears in X-Men '97, voiced by Isaac Robinson-Smith. As of this series, he has joined the X-Men.
- Bishop appears in Wolverine and the X-Men, voiced by Kevin Michael Richardson. This version is a member of Professor X's future X-Men who was trained by Wolverine at a young age.

=== Film ===
Bishop appears in X-Men: Days of Future Past, portrayed by Omar Sy. This version is a member of a future incarnation of the X-Men from the year 2023.

=== Video games ===
- Bishop appears as a playable character in X-Men: Next Dimension.
- Bishop appears as a playable character in X-Men: Gamesmaster's Legacy.
- A young Bishop makes a cameo appearance in X-Men Legends, voiced by Grey DeLisle.
- Bishop appears as a playable character in X-Men Legends II: Rise of Apocalypse, voiced by Khary Payton.
- Bishop appears as a boss in Marvel: Ultimate Alliance 2, voiced by Emerson Brooks.
- A clone of Bishop appears as a non-playable character in Marvel Heroes, voiced again by Emerson Brooks.
- Bishop appears as an unlockable playable character in Marvel Avengers Alliance.
- Bishop appears as a playable character in Marvel Puzzle Quest.
- Bishop appears as a playable character in Marvel Contest of Champions.
- Bishop appears as a playable character in Marvel Future Fight.
- Bishop appears as a playable card in Marvel Snap.

=== Miscellaneous ===
- Bishop appears in the X-Men & Spider-Man: Time's Arrow novel trilogy, written by Tom DeFalco.
- Bishop appears in the novelization for X-Men: The Last Stand, written by Chris Claremont.
