= Share (company) =

German consumer brand based on one for one model

share
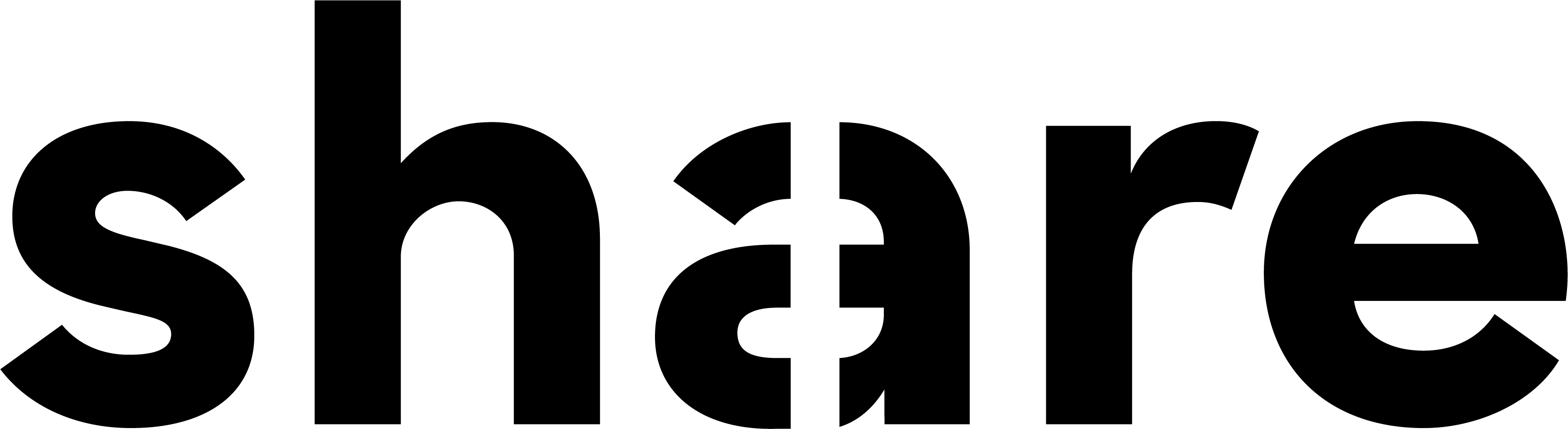
- Founded: 2018
- Type: Start-up company
- Location: Berlin, Germany
- Website: Share.eu

share is a German consumer goods brand and certified B Corporation with products in the food, beverage and personal care sectors. Based on the one for one model one needed item is given away for each item purchased. As of February 2024, share claims to have financed more than 162 million relief efforts. In 2022 and 2023, share was named Germany's "Strongest Startup Brand".

== Company history ==
Share was founded in 2017 by Sebastian Stricker, Iris Braun, Ben Unterkofler and Tobias Reiner. The idea is based on the donation initiative founded by Stricker for the UN World Food Program ShareTheMeal.

The first share products, consisting of water, nut bars and soap, were sold in March 2018. In addition to the launch in the online store through a cooperation with REWE Group and Dm-drogerie markt in over 5,000 stores in Germany. In its first year, share generated sales of 10 million euros. It was the largest launch of a social consumer goods brand in Germany.

In 2019, Bitburger Holding invested 1 million euros, followed by cooperations with Aral and Eurowings. Since the end of 2019, share has also been sold in dm, Merkur and Billa stores in Austria. Since 2020, share has been cooperating with Shell plc and Deutsche Bahn as a sales partner, in June 2020, the brand launched in dm stores in the Czech Republic and supports local food banks with food donations, among other things.

In 2021 Creadev, a French investment company controlled by Association Familiale Mulliez, acquired a stake in Share.

In 2023, share launched a current account in cooperation with the bank ING Group and a mobile phone offer in cooperation with the German telco company Congstar.

== Company ==
Share invests around 7% of its turnover in social projects. In its first year, the start-up sold over 8 million products, financing the construction or repair of 51 wells in Liberia, Cambodia and Ethiopia, as well as the distribution of 2 million meals and 550,000 bars of soap in national and international aid programs. To this end, share works with aid organizations such as the World Food Programme, Aktion gegen den Hunger, Caritas Austria, Welthungerhilfe and Tafel Deutschland e. V. In the meantime, more than 30 million aid projects have been financed with the sale of share products.

== Products ==
In addition to the initial products of mineral water, organic nut bars and hand soap, the company now also sells flavored water, milk substitutes, organic chocolate, organic student food and bamboo toothbrushes, staple foods such as rice, pasta and flour as well as shower gel, shampoo, hand cream and toilet paper. share also sells stationery, hats and scarves.

== Image ==
The start-up received a lot of attention in the German press for its Social entrepreneurship model and an innovation in the packaging sector, the first mineral water bottle made from 100 percent recycled used plastic on the German market.

A few months after its launch, share was certified as a B Corporation and was awarded the "Best for the World" B Corp in the "Community" category in 2019. This makes share one of the 10% of companies worldwide that provide the greatest benefit to the community.

However, Kathrin Krause from the Federation of German Consumer Organizations criticized the fact that share does nothing to address the causes of hunger or the price pressure that retailers exert on their producers. But overall the reception is predominantly positive. Melchior Poppe from German magazine Focus Online particularly emphasizes the holistic approach of share – in both an ecological and social context: "Sustainability across the board – affordable and with positive effects for everyone."

Burkhard Wilke, Managing Director of the German Central Institute for Social Issues, criticized a "certain lack of transparency" at share, as the exact amount of the respective donation is not indicated on the product. Since autumn 2018, share has shown the donation amount for the respective product online. A QR code on the product packaging gives consumers direct access to the project information.
