= List of Marvel Comics characters: G =

== Gaea ==
Gaea is one of the Elder Gods of Earth and the mother of Thor.

== Gaia ==
Gaia, also known as the Guardian of the Universal Amalgamator, is a superhero, depicted as possibly being a mutant or extraterrestrial. Created by Larry Hama, she first appeared in Generation X #37.

Not much is known about Gaia's origin besides her having spent thousands of years chained to the Universal Amalgamator, a device able to merge all sentient consciousnesses into one being. M-Plate's attempts to activate the Amalgamator caused the Citadel to crumble, and Gaia was rescued by Synch.

She was later put under the care of the Massachusetts Academy by the police after she crashed a car. Gaia formally enrolled in the Xavier's School for Gifted Youngsters, but left after a short time, saying that she wanted to experience Earth, not just learn about it.

Gaia has a number of powers, including superhuman strength, durability, longevity, telepathy, psychokinesis, and reality warping.

== Galen-Kor ==
Galen-Kor is a Kree who is the founder of the Lunatic Legion.

=== Galen-Kor in other media ===
- Galen-Kor appears in the Avengers Assemble episode "Captain Marvel", voiced by Michael-Leon Wooley.
- Galen-Kor appears in Avengers in Galactic Storm, voiced by Jon St. John.

== Gali ==
Gali (also known as Galacta) is a fictional character appearing in American comic books published by Marvel Comics. She is the daughter of Galactus and originates from the parallel universe of Earth-610102. Originally a minor character in the comics, Galacta took on a more prominent role in the video game Marvel Rivals, where she was voiced by Cassandra Lee Morris.

Galacta was adapted into Earth-616 continuity as Gail Arakawa, a human who was given a portion of the Power Cosmic used by Galactus.

== Galura ==
Galura (Gabrielle "Elle" Diwa) is a character created by Vita Ayala and Germán Peralta who first appeared in Age of X-Man: Prisoner X #4 (August 2019) as an unnamed prisoner in the pocket dimension created by Nate Grey during the 2019 "Age of X-Man" event. She debuted in the mainstream Marvel continuity in Marvel's Voices: Pride #1 (August 2021).

Galura is a Filipino mutant with bird-like wings. At some point after her powers manifest, she moves to the mutant nation of Krakoa. She later begins dating Karma and joins the New Mutants.

== Gamesmaster ==
Gamesmaster

Publication information
- Publisher: Marvel Comics
- First appearance: The Uncanny X-Men #283 (1991)
- Created by: Whilce Portacio

In-story information
- Species: Human mutant
- Team affiliations: Upstarts
- Notable aliases: Harold Smith
- Abilities: Omnipathic awareness places him in constant contact with every mind on the planet by way of the astral plane

Gamesmaster is a mutant character appearing in American comic books published by Marvel Comics. He first appeared in The Uncanny X-Men #283 (1991).

=== Fictional character biography of Gamesmaster ===
Gamesmaster is a mutant with a powerful form of telepathy that gives him a psychic connection to everyone on Earth. In his life before becoming the Gamesmaster, he led a regular life with a wife and child; however, years of omnipathic exposure to other people's minds drove him to a point where he eventually forgot his own real name. At some point, Gamesmaster was contacted by the immortal sorceress Selene, then the Black Queen of the Hellfire Club. Together, they organized the Upstarts, a competition for wealthy and powerful individuals with the sole purpose of killing mutants for points in a twisted game. He agreed only to provide a distraction from the constant chatter in his mind. By focusing on the ambitious and powerful thoughts of the Upstarts, Gamesmaster was able to drown out the rest of the world.

In his capacity as the referee of the Upstarts' games, Gamesmaster oversaw the Upstarts' activities, which included confrontations with the Hellions and the X-Men. After Selene was removed from the game by the Upstart Trevor Fitzroy, Gamesmaster continued to monitor the competition. After the Upstarts captured several former young members of the mutant trainee team, the New Mutants, and took them to Gamesmaster's base in the Swiss Alps, their teammates in X-Force and the New Warriors attempted to rescue them. Gamesmaster would have defeated them if it were not for the intervention of Paige Guthrie, the mutant sister of Cannonball, who argued that a greater game would be to compete with Professor X, the telepathic founder of the X-Men, and others like him who hoped to find and guide the next generation of mutants. Gamesmaster agrees and disbands the Upstarts after allowing the heroes to leave.

Gamesmaster retained his mutant powers following the events of M-Day. He showed a strong interest in the mutant X-23 and promised to watch her closely, even against her will.

=== Powers and abilities of Gamesmaster ===
Gamesmaster is an omnipath, a superhuman telepath able to hear the thoughts of every being on the planet. However, he cannot block the thoughts out, and thus his mind is constantly filled with voices unless he is able to intensely concentrate on a distraction. Gamesmaster also possesses the ability to manipulate the thoughts of others and has suggested that, in addition to controlling minds en masse (as he once did with Salem Center in New York), he can manipulate the thoughts of the entire population of Earth simultaneously (though Jean Grey determined this to be a fallacy while in combat with him). To a lesser extent, Gamesmaster is also able to control the actions of other sentient beings. He was also shown to be capable of keeping other superhuman abilities in check, as he once did with the X-Man Rogue.

=== Gamesmaster in other media ===
- Gamesmaster makes non-speaking cameo appearances in the X-Men: The Animated Series.
- Gamesmaster appears in X-Men: Gamesmaster's Legacy.

== Ganymede ==
Ganymede is an extraterrestrial superhero in the Marvel Comics Universe. Her first appearance was Silver Surfer (vol. 3) #80 (May 1993).

Ganymede is the last surviving member of a race of warrior women known as the Spinsterhood, a group which was formed with the sole purpose of destroying the cosmic being Tyrant. After a centuries long cryogenic sleep, she awakened to find Tyrant's servants kidnapping powerful cosmic entities to drain their powers for their master's own ends. Mistaking Silver Surfer for a minion of Tyrant, Ganymede attacked him and the two fought until Tyrant's minions ambushed and kidnapped them both.

Ganymede, along with Tyrant's other hostages, Silver Surfer, Terrax, Morg, Beta Ray Bill, Gladiator and Jack of Hearts, escaped their imprisonment and attacked Tyrant together, only to fail miserably. Galactus arrived and ended the battle. After that, those involved went their separate ways except for Ganymede, who decided to stay with Jack of Hearts to help nurse him back to health after his selfless sacrifice that freed his fellow captives. Ganymede and Jack of Hearts had a few adventures together, wherein they struck up a romantic relationship.

== Gargantos ==
Gargantos is a minor Marvel Comics character who originally appeared in Sub-Mariner #13 (1969). He is a giant sea monster, typically under the control of the villain Naga or the Lemurians. Gargantos is a large, green, tentacled creature, visually similar to the Old One Shuma-Gorath.

== Gargouille ==
Gargouille (Lavinia LeBlanc) is a character appearing in American comic books published by Marvel Comics. The character was created by John Ostrander, Joe Edkin and Ivan Reis, and first appeared in Quicksilver #9 (May 1998). She is a diminutive mutant who has razor-sharp claws and horns, and bat-like wings with which she could fly.

=== Gargouille in other media ===
Gargouille makes a non-speaking cameo appearance in the X-Men '97 episode "Remember It" as a resident of Genosha.

== Gargoyle ==
Gargoyle is a name shared by two characters appearing in American comic books published by Marvel Comics.

=== Yuri Topolov ===
The first Gargoyle, Yuri Topolov, created by Stan Lee and Jack Kirby, is a supervillain who first appeared in The Incredible Hulk #1 (May 1962).

Yuri Topolov is a Soviet scientist and the Hulk's first foe. An atomic accident caused from working with radiation mutated him into a large-headed dwarf. The Gargoyle was informed about the Hulk by an imprisoned spy using a miniature transmitter. By firing a gun with will-weakening pellets, he succeeded in capturing both him and Rick Jones. Bruce Banner cures Topolov of his mutation via gamma rays. In gratitude, Topolov allows Banner and Rick to use his rocket to return to the United States before setting off an explosion that kills himself and several Soviet generals.

=== Isaac Christians ===
The second Gargoyle, Isaac Christians, created by J. M. DeMatteis and Don Perlin, is a demonic superhero and a member of the Defenders, who first appeared in The Defenders #94 (April 1981). In 1985, Gargoyle starred in a four-issue limited series written by DeMatteis.

Isaac Christians is an elderly man who sold his soul to the Six-Fingered Hand, a group of minor demons, in exchange for prosperity for the dying hometown that his ancestors had founded (the fictional town of Christiansboro, Virginia). Christians makes a pact with the demon Avarrish to inhabit the body of a legendary gargoyle and act as an agent of the Six-Fingered Hand. Christians battles the Defenders, but joins them and rebels against the Six-Fingered Hand.

Christians returns to Christiansboro and is released from the Gargoyle body. However, a demon takes control of the Gargoyle body. Christians retakes control of the Gargoyle and kills his original human body to prevent the demon from returning. After Christians's Gargoyle body is destroyed, Cloud creates a new body for him, allowing him to switch between his gargoyle and human forms at will. He becomes an instructor at Camp Hammond, the training grounds of the Initiative.

=== Gargoyle in other media ===
- The Yuri Topolov incarnation of Gargoyle, referred to as Gorgon, appears in the Hulk segment of The Marvel Super Heroes.
- The Yuri Topolov incarnation of Gargoyle appears in The Incredible Hulk, voiced by Mark Hamill.
- The Yuri Topolov incarnation of Gargoyle appears in Lego Marvel's Avengers.

== Garko the Man-Frog ==
Garko the Man-Frog is a one off villain in Marvel Comics. The character was created by Steve Gerber and Frank Brunner and solely appeared in Giant-Size Man-Thing #4 (February 1975).

Garko was an ordinary human who possessed a vial of chemicals that transformed him into a humanoid frog. He runs into Howard the Duck, who had just landed in Cleveland, Ohio and was helped out by a couple of kids. The two of them battle. During the fight, Garko further mutates into a mindless normal frog and is crushed by a police cruiser.

=== Garko the Man-Frog in other media ===
Garko appears in Moon Girl and Devil Dinosaur, voiced by Gary Anthony Williams. This version claims to have swum in a radioactive lake where he transformed into a humanoid frog.

== Sean Garrison ==
Sean Garrison is a psychologist who is introduced as a guest speaker for Xuân Cao Mạnh's graduation. Garrison is particularly disliked for his affectionate nature towards mutants, often given the name "mutie-lover". Garrison later appeared in New X-Men: Academy X as the psychologist of Kevin Ford. Garrison is revealed to be a mutant and the father of X-Men student Laurie Collins, who inherited his pheromone-based powers.

== Gauntlet ==
Gauntlet is the name of two characters appearing in American comic books published by Marvel Comics.

=== Gauntlet in other media ===
The Inhuman incarnation of Gauntlet appears in the X-Men: Evolution episode "Target X", voiced by Mark Gibbon.

== Blackie Gaxton ==
Blackie Gaxton is a character appearing in American comic books published by Marvel Comics. The character was created by Stan Lee and Steve Ditko, and first appeared in The Amazing Spider-Man #11 (January 1964). He was a gangster to whom Bennett Brant owed a large gambling debt. He blackmailed Brant into getting his sister Betty Brant to contact Doctor Octopus when he was released from prison to spring Gaxton from prison himself. When Spider-Man caught up with Gaxton and Doctor Octopus on his getaway ship, Gaxton accidentally shot Bennett during a struggle with Spider-Man. He was arrested again and supposedly returned to prison.

=== Blackie Gaxton in other media ===
Blackie Gaxton appears in The Spectacular Spider-Man, voiced by Steve Blum. This version is the manager of the Big Sky Lounge.

== Gazing Nightshade ==
Gazing Nightshade is a mutant character appearing in X-Men comic books published by Marvel Comics. The character was created by Cullen Bunn and Ray-Anthony first appearing X-Men: Blue #6 (June 2017).

Gazing Nightshade was a member of the Raksha, a group of mutant vigilantes from Madripoor. She was recruited by Polaris into the time displaced X-Men when most of the members were in outer space. She became a close friend of the time displaced Beast, and soon became romantically involved. She had the mutant ability to induce despair in anyone she looked upon.

== Geatar ==
Geatar is a character appearing in American comic books published by Marvel Comics. Created by Jim Starlin and Ron Lim, he first appeared in Silver Surfer (vol. 3) #38 (April 1990).

Geatar is an alien and member of a group of space pirates led by Nebula. Thanos utilizes Geatar to fake his death, with Geatar being killed in an explosion. After discovering that Geatar has died, Mentor resurrects him using Titanian technology.

== Geist ==
Geist (Nikolaus Geist) was a supervillain in Marvel Comics. He was created by Archie Goodwin, and first appeared in Wolverine (vol. 2) #17 (November 1989).

Geist was an adviser for Adolf Hitler during World War II. Following the war, Geist became an adviser to President Caridad of the fictional South American country Tierra Verde. There, Geist experimented on humans in a bid to create a super-soldier similar to Captain America, with his main test subject being Roughouse.

Geist initially uses a metallic shell for life support. After Wolverine cuts off the shell, Geist is taken out of Tierra Verde for treatment. Geist returns in the series Captain America: Hail Hydra, where he creates a godlike being called the Great God Hydra and integrates himself into its body. However, Captain America convinces the god to turn against Hydra, with Geist being removed from its body and dispelled into the universe.

== Annie Ghazikhanian ==
Annie Ghazikhanian is a nurse who worked with the X-Men. She first appeared in The Uncanny X-Men vol. 1 #411 (August 2002), and was created by Chuck Austen and Ron Garney.

She is assigned to Havok's care after the later is found in a comatose state. Despite Havok's only real reaction being an energetic appreciation of the sunlight, she develops romantic feelings towards Havok. When the X-Men discover Havok is still alive (as previously was presumed dead), Cyclops comes to collect Havok while Annie and her son soon move in.

Annie is a normal human, but her son Carter Ghazikhanian is a mutant. Annie has some anti-mutant prejudices which she tries to get over. She developed a personal friendship with Northstar and kept secret the latter's romantic feelings for Iceman. She is seen many times administering to wounded X-Men.

Havok wakes from a coma and pursues a relationship with Annie, even after being engaged to Polaris. Havok later leaves Polaris at the wedding altar, further damaging the woman's already-shaky mental state. He and Annie have a romantic relationship (despite her occasional flirtations with Iceman) until she leaves the mansion. She fears for her son's safety because of supervillain attacks upon the X-Mansion.

== Carter Ghazikhanian ==
Carter Ghazikhanian is a mutant character in the Marvel Comics Universe. His first appearance was in The Uncanny X-Men vol. 1 #411 (August 2002), created by Chuck Austen and Ron Garney. Carter is a mutant with telepathic and telekinetic abilities. The extent of Carter's powers remain undetermined.

Carter is the son of Annie Ghazikhanian, the former nurse at the Xavier Institute. Annie later took him away from the Xavier Institute when she found it a too dangerous place for him. While they leave, the astral projection of an undetermined person is shown next to Carter's face and Annie seems unaware of this projection. Carter's dialogue and expression at this time hint that he is under the control of this individual. The projection was later revealed by Austen as Cassandra Nova's intended return, but the storyline was dropped on Austen's departure from the books.

== Ghost Girl ==
Ghost Girl is an alias used by multiple superheroes in the Marvel Universe.

=== Wendy Hunt ===
Wendy Hunt is a superhero in the Marvel Universe. She first appeared in The Invaders #14 (March 1977) and was created by Roy Thomas and Frank Robbins as an homage to DC Comics' Phantom Lady. She is a member of the Crusaders, and possesses a belt which enables her to generate a holographic double of herself.

=== Lili Stephens ===
Lili Stephens is a mutant superhero in the Marvel Universe. She was created by Steve Seagle and Scott Clark, and first appeared in Alpha Flight (vol. 2) #2.

Ghost Girl is a former member of the superhero team Alpha Flight. Department H call her a "Legacy" case, but it is never explained what that means.

She possesses the ability to "phase" or pass through solid matter by passing her atoms through the spaces between the atoms of the object through which she is moving. While intangible, she is invulnerable to physical attacks. She can also use her intangible body to create gateways through solid objects for others to use, which she finds ticklish.

== G'iah ==
G'iah is an agent who was chosen to mate with fellow agent Klrr, as she came from the Skrull planet where most of the offspring became Warskrulls. The two eventually developed a genuine relationship with each other. Both lived on Earth and raised their three daughters together, under the guise of a normal American family.

During a mission, their daughter, Ivy, was captured and seemingly murdered by Project Blossom, a secret organization dedicated to hunting down undercover Skrull agents. One of G'iah's daughters, Alkss II, faced an agent from Project Blossom who attempted to kill the family at their house, but was murdered by Alkss. G'iah became repulsed with what her family has become, as Klrr congratulated his daughter.

While retrieving a device that allows Project Blossom to locate the Skrulls, G'iah discovered that Ivy was still alive, finding her inside a facility. Moloth, a Skrull agent, murdered Klrr, and attempted to capture the rest of the family while posing as Klrr. G'iah recognized him, and Alkss II eventually murdered Moloth. After Project Blossom fell apart, G'iah and her three daughters began to search for a safe place.

== Gibbon ==
Gibbon is the name of two characters appearing in American comic books published by Marvel Comics.

=== Martin Blank ===
Martin Blank is a man who was seemingly born a mutant with an ape-like appearance and agility. Gibbon later joins a circus, where he does well as an acrobat. Martin Blank begins his career as a friend of Spider-Man's while wearing a gibbon suit. He even wants to be his partner, but Spider-Man laughs at him. Sick of being seen as a freak, Martin cannot take further ridicule and lashes out. He then catches the eye of Kraven the Hunter, who enhances the Gibbon's powers with a herb broth, also giving him a great animal rage. Gibbon was defeated by Spider-Man.

Gibbon appears as the lead character in the Marvel Apes storyline. Out of boredom and depression, he replies to an ad posted on the Daily Bugle by Fiona Fitzhugh, a scientist hoping to study the nature of superpowered individuals. Her experiments fling both of them into a reality populated by simian version of the Marvel Heroes, and destroy the machines that could have been used to bring Gibbon back. Fiona supposes, due to Gibbon having his powers since birth, instead of gaining them in puberty as the majority of the mutants, and being "drawn" to that particular reality, that Gibbon may be connected somehow to the simian world. While Fiona asks for help from the simian version of the Fantastic Four, Gibbon is inducted by Spider-Monkey into the Ape-Vengers. Despite their friendly facade, the Ape-Vengers are far more ruthless and bestial than their human counterparts. Gibbon sets out to discover the truth, with the help of a cadre of dissident simian heroes: the Ape-Vengers are under the thrall of Baron Blood, who in this reality stole the appearance and the powers of Captain America, using his influence to prey over villains' and dissidents' blood at his leisure. Along with Speedball and Wolverine, despite being now pursued by Baron Blood and his followers, Gibbon manages to free Captain America from the iceberg in which he was entombed since the 1940s, gaining his help in battling the impersonator. Eventually, he and Fiona make their way back home.

During the "Hunted" storyline, Gibbon is captured for Kraven the Hunter's Great Hunt. After being mortally wounded by Hunter-Bots, Gibbon reflects on his life and concludes that Princess Python never loved him. Spider-Man stays with Gibbon as he dies.

=== Unnamed criminal ===
Martin Blank sells his costume to Roderick Kingsley, who gives it to an unnamed criminal. Gibbon is present with Hobgoblin (Kingsley's butler Claude) when he leads his forces into fighting the Goblin King's Goblin Nation. After Hobgoblin is killed by Goblin King, Gibbon joins the Goblin Nation.

== Gregson Gilbert ==
Gregson Gilbert is a character appearing in American comic books published by Marvel Comics.

Gregson Gilbert is a professor of biology who created a semi-humanoid robot called Dragon Man. When trying to find a way to bring it to life, Gilbert was approached by the alchemist Diablo who used his talents to bring it to life. After Diablo and Dragon Man were lost in the strange currents during the fight with the Fantastic Four, Gilbert stayed at the university and prepared for when Dragon Man will return.

=== Gregson Gilbert in other media ===
Gregson Gilbert appears in The New Fantastic Four episode "Calamity on the Campus", voiced by John Stephenson.

== Rose Gilberti ==
Rose Gilberti is a character appearing in Marvel Comics. The character was created by Mike Higgins, Karl Bollers and Martin Egeland, and first appeared in X-Men vol. 2 #68 (August 1997).

Rose Gilberti is the adoptive mother of Bastion. She and the X-Men disagree with Bastion's anti-mutant ideology and the Prime Sentinels. Rose is killed by government agents fumbling containment, resulting in Bastion's elimination of empathy from his mother figure's influence.

=== Rose Gilberti in other media ===
Rose appears in the X-Men '97 episode "Tolerance is Extinction", voiced by Kari Wahlgren. This version is the biological mother of Bastion.

== Gladiator ==
Gladiator is the name of two characters appearing in American comic books published by Marvel Comics.

== Heather Glenn ==
Heather Glenn is a character appearing in American comic books published by Marvel Comics. She is briefly a love interest to Daredevil (Matt Murdock). The character, created by Marv Wolfman and William Robert Brown, first appeared in Daredevil #126 (July 1975).

Heather first appears when she barges into the apartment of Matt Murdock, thinking it was her ex-boyfriend Frankie. Not realizing that he moved out and that Matt had just bought the place, she is surprised, but not angered, admitting that Frankie was a "creep" and that she finds Matt handsome. Due to still having spare keys to the apartment, Heather begins to invite herself over and openly flirt with Matt, revealing that her ex, whom she absent-mindedly starts calling "Freddy", is now married and happily begins to make out with Matt against his will. After that, she becomes something of a tagalong for Matt and Foggy Nelson, even becoming their new secretary. She starts off as a nuisance for Matt, but she calms down before revealing that her father is Maxwell Glenn, CEO of Glenn Industries, and helps finance his and Foggy's storefront.

Maxwell later becomes a suspect in embezzled funds, but Heather refuses to believe the accusations. Eventually, the embezzler turns out to be his assistant Mr. Stone, relieving Heather. Despite this, her father is once again placed under investigation and arrested. Matt continues to treat Heather like a child due to her scatterbrained behavior and she leaves their storefront, but he manages to bring her back. Unknown to Heather, Maxwell is revealed to have been under the influence of Purple Man. Soon after, Heather is hit with two major bombs: her father committed suicide in prison, and Matt is Daredevil. Angered over the truth, Heather breaks up with Matt.

Purple Man lures Daredevil into a trap, using Heather as bait, and pits him against his rogues. Eventually, Daredevil is victorious and takes Heather home. Heather comes back to Matt, slightly more accepting of his double life as a crime fighter. They continue to have an on-again/off-again relationship, with Heather finding herself in the middle of Daredevil's adventures. She resumes running Glenn Industries, but cannot help feeling ignored by Matt. He later proposes to Heather and while she accepts, she is unhappy with his intent for her to quit her position at Glenn Industries, especially when she discovers a conspiracy within the company. To save both Matt and Heather's careers, Foggy and Black Widow forge letters to both of them, causing the two to break up.

Heather falls back into alcoholism and resumes her socialite lifestyle. She briefly dates Tony Stark, before moving on to computer expert and Mayor's aide Tarkington Brown. While under the influence, Heather accidentally reveals that Matt is Daredevil to him. She rushes to warn Matt, though the two of them still have some slight animosity between them. Nevertheless, Matt rescues Heather from Tarkington. Ultimately, Heather cannot pull herself out of her alcoholism and depression. She calls Matt to come and see her, but while he talks with her, he leaves to stop a mugging. Believing that he is leaving her for good, Heather hangs herself.

=== Heather Glenn in other media ===
- Heather Glenn makes a vocal cameo appearance in Daredevil (2003), voiced by an uncredited Claudine Farrell.
- Heather Glenn appears in Daredevil: Born Again, portrayed by Margarita Levieva. This version is a therapist, author, and the girlfriend of Matt Murdock. After one of her patients, Bastian Cooper, reveals himself to be the serial killer Muse, he attempts to murder her before she is saved by Murdock and ultimately kills Muse. After breaking up with Murdock and becoming the Commissioner of Mental Health under New York City Mayor Wilson Fisk, she develops post-traumatic stress disorder after her encounter with Muse, and begins having hallucinations about him which eventually lead her to become the second Muse.

== Glowworm ==
Glowworm is the name of two unrelated characters appearing in American comic books published by Marvel Comics. Though created only a few months apart, they have little in common except the name.

=== William Blake ===
Glow Worm

Publication information
- Publisher: Marvel Comics
- First appearance: Power Man/Iron Fist #123 (May 1986)
- Created by: Jim Owsley; Mark Bright; Jerry Acerno

In-story information
- Alter ego: William Blake
- Species: Human mutate
- Notable aliases: Race Killer, White Devil
- Abilities: Superhuman strength and resistance

The first Glowworm debuted in Power Man and Iron Fist #123 (May 1986). This version was William Blake, a former soldier who had volunteered for experiments to re-create the Super-Soldier Serum. After leaving the Marine Corps, one night he transformed into a huge, glowing white creature who began screaming racial slurs and attacking black people in Power Man's neighborhood. When news got out that a "white mutant" was attacking blacks, it nearly sparked a race riot, but once Cage defeated the creature, it reverted to human form, revealing that he was a black man himself. Blake had grown up in the Deep South, at a time when rampant racism led him to believe that blacks were inferior to whites, resulting in his own hatred of himself and his own race.

=== Second version ===
Glow Worm

Publication information
- Publisher: Marvel Comics
- First appearance: X-Factor #7 (August 1986)
- Created by: Louise Jones; Jackson Guise

In-story information
- Species: Human mutant
- Team affiliations: Morlocks
- Abilities: Volatile constructs

The second Glowworm first appeared in X-Factor #7 (August 1986). This version is a mutant with a humanoid torso, and a worm-like tail in place of legs. He is the partner of Bulk, a mutant with enormous size and strength.

Bulk and Glowworm were outcasts, not just for their mutant status or unusual appearance, but because both continually gave off toxic radiation that proved to be a problem for the Morlocks. The two sought shelter in a toxic waste dump in New Jersey, but upon hearing about the group X-Factor (who at that time were posing as mutant hunters), the pair decided to attack them to "protect mutants". After a short battle, the members of X-Factor explained their true nature as mutants themselves. The two returned to their isolation.

In The New Mutants Annual #4, Bulk and Glowworm sacrifice themselves to save Danielle Moonstar. In the series Legion of X, part of the Krakoan Age, Glowworm is revealed to have been resurrected by the Five.

=== Glowworm in other media ===
The second version of Glowworm appears in X-Men: The Animated Series as a member of the Morlocks.

== Glyph ==
Glyph (Nadeen Hassan) is a teenager who became a beacon that summoned ancient Egyptian spirits. She was ultimately recruited into the Howling Commandos.

== Bobby Gnucci ==
Robert "Bobby" Gnucci was created by Garth Ennis and artist Steve Dillon, and first appeared in The Punisher vol. 5 #1 (February 2000).

=== Bobby Gnucci in other media ===
- Bobby Gnucci appears in The Punisher (2005).
- Bobby Gnucci appears in The Punisher: One Last Kill, portrayed by Joseph Devito.

== Carlo Gnucci ==
Carlo Gnucci was created by Garth Ennis and artist Steve Dillon, and first appeared in The Punisher vol. 5 #1 (February 2000).

=== Carlo Gnucci in other media ===
Carlo Gnucci appears in The Punisher: One Last Kill, portrayed by David Manuele.

== Eddie Gnucci ==
Edward "Eddie" Gnucci was created by Garth Ennis and artist Steve Dillon, and first appeared in The Punisher vol. 5 #1 (February 2000).

=== Eddie Gnucci in other media ===
Eddie Gnucci appears in The Punisher: One Last Kill.

== Goblin King ==
Goblin King is the name of several characters in Marvel Comics.

=== First version ===
The first Goblin King first appeared in Avataars: Covenant of the Shield #2 (September 2000), and was created by Len Kaminski and Óscar Jiménez.

=== Norman Osborn ===
Norman Osborn is the second Goblin King. When the children that work for the Vulture are discussing what to do after the Superior Spider-Man (Otto Octavius's mind in Spider-Man's body) brutally defeats the Vulture, he approaches the children and tells the group that he will be the one that crushes the Superior Spider-Man. He is later shown having gathered a new gang of followers together in the sewers formed from discarded members of other villains' gangs like the Vulture, the Owl and the third White Dragon's gangs; these henchmen escaped their organizations unharmed because the Superior Spider-Man is more focused on the larger threats (where the original Spider-Man would focus on individuals). Osborn acts as the Goblin King while building an army called the Goblin Nation to attack the Superior Spider-Man.

=== Phil Urich ===
Phil Urich is the third Goblin King. Following the conclusion of The Superior Spider-Man storyline where the true Spider-Man returns, Urich leads the Goblin Nation's remnants as the self-proclaimed Goblin King.

=== Goblin King in other media ===
- The Norman Osborn incarnation of the Goblin King appears in the Ultimate Spider-Man episode "Nightmare on Christmas". This version is resembles the more hulking version albeit sporting ram-like horns and medieval armor.
- An original incarnation of the Goblin King, Adrian Toomes, appears in the Spider-Man four-part episode "Goblin War", voiced by Alastair Duncan.

== Goblyn ==
Goblyn (Goblyn Dean) is a mutant character in the Marvel Comics universe. She first appeared in Alpha Flight #48 (July 1987), and was created by Bill Mantlo and Terry Shoemaker.

Goblyn is one of a pair of fraternal twins. Before birth, it was revealed that Goblyn was a mutant and would possess a monstrous appearance. Her parents decided that for her own good she would be aborted. Sensing the danger, her sister Laura (later known as Pathway) used her own mutant ability to send Goblyn to another dimension where she would be safe. Later Laura would return her to Earth, where they would both become involved with Alpha Flight.

== Gog ==
Gog

Publication information
- Publisher: Marvel Comics
- First appearance: The Amazing Spider-Man #103 (December 1971)
- Created by: Roy Thomas (writer); Gil Kane (artist)

In-story information
- Species: Tsilin
- Team affiliations: Sinister Six
- Abilities: Superhuman strength Interdimensional teleportation via bracelets

Gog is a supervillain appearing in American comic books published by Marvel Comics. The character has appeared in The Amazing Spider-Man and X-Men. Created by writer Roy Thomas and Gil Kane, the character first appears in The Amazing Spider-Man #103.

While traveling through the Savage Land, Kraven the Hunter finds a crashed spaceship in quicksand and ventures inside. There, he finds the juvenile Gog and another member of his species, who died during the crash landing of the spaceship. Deciding to save the young Gog from his sinking ship, Kraven takes him with him and decides to raise him as a pet; much to Kraven's surprise, Gog rapidly grows to a gigantic size only days after being found. Kraven, realizing how useful Gog can be, decides to use him in a plot to conquer the Savage Land. After kidnapping the visiting Gwen Stacy from a camp in the Savage Land, Kraven and Gog battle the heroes Ka-Zar and Spider-Man. While Ka-Zar deals with Kraven, Spider-Man defeats Gog by luring him into a patch of quicksand, which he then sinks to the bottom of. Gog would later be saved from dying in the quicksand by the Plunderer. Having Gog (who created a device that allowed him to speak English) act as his servant, the Plunderer uses him in a plot to try to steal the super-soldier serum in New York City. Followed to New York by Ka-Zar, Gog and the Plunderer battle him before Gog, using his teleportation bracelets, escapes, first to the Statue of Liberty, then the World Trade Center and finally, to another dimension.

Gog is later found by Doctor Octopus and the Sinister Six, who induct the creature into their group as the sixth and final member. Whilst engaged in battle with several heroes, Gog is beaten in combat by the hero Solo and shrunken by Mister Fantastic, who sends him back to the dimension the Sinister Six found him in.

Gog reappeared in The Amazing Spider-Man with underwriter Nick Spencer detailing his new origin as an alien pet and voyage to Earth as Kraven's bodyguard.

=== Gog in other media ===
Gog was considered to appear in a spin-off film to The Amazing Spider-Man featuring the Sinister Six, with Drew Goddard attached to write and direct.

== Goldbug ==
Goldbug is the name of three characters appearing in American comic books published by Marvel Comics.

=== Matthew Gilden ===
Matthew Gilden is a gold-obsessed, technologically powered professional thief. In his first appearance, Goldbug, using the false identity of "Jack Smith", hires Luke Cage to prevent a shipment of gold from being stolen by Goldbug. "Smith" then steals the gold and attempted to pin the crime on Cage and Thunderbolt. Cage and Thunderbolt recover the gold and clear their names, but Goldbug escapes.

Later, Goldbug is revealed to be an unwitting pawn of They Who Wield Power, including Hulk's foe Tyrannus, and sets out to capture Hulk. Goldbug kidnapped Hulk to power his technology and set out to find the city of El Dorado, the legendary "city of gold." Hulk broke free and escaped, causing the Bugship to crash. They nevertheless arrive in El Dorado, with Hulk dragging the unconscious Goldbug to El Dorado. There, Goldbug plans to kill Hulk, but one of the members of They Who Wield Power reveals himself to be Tyrannus, who kills the other two members of They. Goldbug learns that he had been Tyrannus' pawn and turns on Tyrannus, but is captured. Goldbug frees Hulk from captivity to battle Tyrannus, and they used El Dorado's technology against him. Tyrannus was teleported into space. Hulk and Goldbug are teleported to New York, where Goldbug is apprehended by Luke Cage and Iron Fist.

Goldbug was next hired by the Maggia to steal some gold from an Empire State University laboratory. He did so, not realizing that the gold had been exposed to radiation during experiments at the university, and that he had thereby contracted radiation poisoning. He battled Spider-Man, but when Spider-Man revealed the gold's radioactivity, the Maggia turned on Goldbug, who fell into the river and disappeared.

Later, when the Superhuman Registration Act was announced during the Civil War event, Goldbug wanted to leave the country. He contacted Vienna to make him a new fake identity, but he did not know Vienna was secretly working for the new Heroes for Hire, who later apprehended Goldbug and several other super-villains. When Goldbug and the Plunderer were brought to Captain America's Secret Avengers by Diamondback, the Punisher shoots and kills them both.

=== Second version ===
A second version of Goldbug, equipped with the original's Secret War-era armor, appears as one of the villains being extorted by Lady Caterpillar.

As part of the All-New, All-Different Marvel event, Goldbug hatches a scheme with White Rabbit and Walrus to tamper with New York City's water supply, but the three are defeated by Spider-Woman, and placed in a new supervillain prison called the Cellar.

=== Third version ===
Roderick Kingsley sold one of Goldbug's old costumes to an unnamed criminal. This version encountered Spider-Woman during one of his criminal activities and was defeated by her.

== Golden Archer ==
Golden Archer (Wyatt McDonald) is a superhero appearing in American comic books published by Marvel Comics. The character was created by Roy Thomas and John Buscema and first appeared in The Avengers #85 (February 1971). He is a member of the Squadron Supreme. He has also gone by the codenames Hawkeye and Black Archer.

Wyatt McDonald, an Australian cab driver in his civilian guise, was a master archer with a large selection of specialized trick arrows. He originally began his career as a masked superhero under the identity of Hawkeye. He developed a relationship with Linda Lewis (a.k.a. Lady Lark), a former vocalist whose vocal cords had been altered by the criminal mastermind Doctor Decibel. However, McDonald's relationship with Lady Lark becomes strained as she develops romantic feelings for fellow Squadron member Blue Eagle. McDonald proposes to Linda, but she rejects him. Desperate to maintain their relationship, he uses a behavior-modifying machine (created to reform criminals) to make her love him, completely changing her personality in the process.

He is soon captured by the Squadron's enemies, the Institute of Evil. The Institute tortures the Archer into revealing the location of the Squadron's new base of operations, and attack and capture the Squadron. They use the behavior modification device on the heroes to make them be on their side, but it is revealed that after the Archer had used the machine on Lady Lark, the machine had been modified so it could not affect other Squadron members. The Golden Archer later admits what he did to Lady Lark, and the team votes to expel him. He later changes his name to the Black Archer and joins the Redeemers, a team founded by Nighthawk to oppose the Squadron's domination of the planet. The teams eventually battle each other, and Black Archer is killed by a blow from Blue Eagle.

The Golden Archer has no superhuman powers, but he is a skilled archer. He uses a customized double-recurve bow, with both conventional arrows and a wide variety of "trick arrows". He has hand-to-hand combat experience, trained by Nighthawk. He also wore a protective force field belt, as a Squadron member, designed by Tom Thumb.

=== Supreme Power Golden Archer ===
An African-American superhero called Black Archer appears in the Supreme Power: Hyperion miniseries, set in a possible future of the Supreme Power universe.

=== Heroes Reborn Golden Archer ===
In the 2021 "Heroes Reborn" reality, Golden Archer is a member of the Secret Squadron. During the fight with Siege Society, Golden Archer had a duel with Hawkeye before being stepped on by an enlarged Fire Ant.

== Golden Girl ==
Golden Girl is the name of two characters appearing in American comic books published by Marvel Comics.

=== Gwenny Lou Sabuki ===
Gwendolyne "Gwenny" Lou Sabuki was the second Golden Girl introduced by Marvel. She made her first appearance in 1978, but her World War II-era character predates the post-war Golden Girl, Betsy Ross. Created by writer Roy Thomas and penciller Frank Robbins in the Retcon series The Invaders #26 (March 1978), she had appeared, sans power, as Gwenny Lou. She gained her powers in the following issue, #27 (April 1978), and went on to appear as the Golden Girl in #28 (May 1978) and #38 (March 1979). A flashback story featuring her as one of the Kid Commandos is in All-New Invaders #6–7.

During World War II, teenaged Gwenny Lou Sabuki, daughter of Japanese American scientist Sam Sabuki, was present at a stateside battle in which sidekicks Bucky and Toro of the Invaders superhero team fought the supervillain Agent Axis. One of Dr. Sabuki's inventions accidentally gave Gwenny Lou and her friend David "Davey" Mitchell superhuman powers. Gwenny Lou gained the power to generate light and energy and the ability to project golden force beams from her hands. Mitchell gained the ability to spin at superhuman speeds. She became Golden Girl, and he became the Human Top. The four youthful heroes defeated Agent Axis and later formed the Kid Commandos, who were allied with the adult Invaders.

In one incident, the Kid Commandos also fought the Invaders because they disagreed with the military's use of a Tsunami Bomb, which would have caused too much collateral damage. The bomb was never used because the Invaders saw the testing site was populated with civilians.

Gwenny Lou later helped found the post-war organization known as the V-Battalion. Gwenny eventually changed her superhero name to Golden Woman before she died in 1961. Her son and her granddaughter became the superheroes Golden Sun and Goldfire, respectively, although Golden Sun died when his own daughter was five years old. Another of Gwenny Lou's granddaughters eventually became the Japanese heroine, Radiance.

== Michele Gonzales ==
Michele Gonzales is a supporting character of Spider-Man in Marvel Comics' main shared universe. She is a criminal defense lawyer and the hot-tempered sister of Vin Gonzales, Peter Parker's roommate. She temporarily is Peter's roommate while Vin serves time for his involvement in the Spider-Tracer Killings frame-up. When Michele attempts to kick Peter out (who is actually the Chameleon in disguise) she is instead seduced by him and becomes infatuated with him. She is almost constantly angry, but is also a helpful and kind person, by trying hard to help her clients get their lives back on track. After pestering and bothering Peter tirelessly, she returned to her previous home in Chicago shortly after Vin's release.

== Gordon ==
Gordon is a character who was created for the Marvel Cinematic Universe before appearing in Marvel Comics. The character, created by Jeffrey Bell, Jed Whedon and Maurissa Tancharoen, first appeared in "What They Become" of Agents of S.H.I.E.L.D. (December 9, 2014) and is portrayed by Jamie Harris.

Gordon made his comic book debut in Uncanny Inhumans #0 (June 2015) from Ryan Stegman and Ryan Lee. Gordon was imprisoned in another dimension with the monstrous Inhuman named Snarkle. Both were exiled by the Great King Kalden 2,000 years ago for unknown reasons. In modern-day New Attilan, the Inhumans Flint and Iso activate a portal to the other dimension. Snarkle enters their dimension with the intent of having their revenge, but Gordon chooses to stay.

== Gorgeous George ==
Gorgeous George (George Blair) is a mutant character in the Marvel Comics Universe. He was created by Peter David and Larry Stroman, and his first appearance was in X-Factor #75 (December 1991).

Very little is known about Gorgeous George, but it is known that he was a member of the Nasty Boys, a group of young mutants whose first and only missions were against the government-sponsored X-Factor. The goal of the group was to gain influence and power in the legislative areas of Washington D.C..

Gorgeous George possesses a tar-like body that gives him elasticity. George retained his mutant powers after M-Day and opened a lab for mutant growth hormone production with Hairbag and Slab.

=== Gorgeous George in other media ===
Gorgeous George appears in X-Men: The Animated Series, voiced by Rod Wilson.

== Gorgon ==
Gorgon is the name of two characters in Marvel Comics.

== Gorr the Golden Gorilla ==
Gorr the Golden Gorilla

Publication information
- Publisher: Marvel Comics
- First appearance: Fantastic Four #171 (June 1976)
- Created by: Roy Thomas; George Pérez

In-story information
- Species: Evolved golden gorilla
- Team affiliations: New Men
- Abilities: Superhuman strength, durability, speed, agility, and intelligence; Fire immunity

Gorr the Golden Gorilla is a character appearing in American comic books published by Marvel Comics. Created by writer Roy Thomas and artist George Pérez, Gorr debuted in Fantastic Four #171–175 (June–October 1976). Gorr is a golden gorilla given human intelligence and greatly increased strength by the High Evolutionary.

When the High Evolutionary arrives on Earth, Gorr mutates into a King Kong-sized monstrosity and rampages through Manhattan, climbing to the top of the Chrysler Building. When the Fantastic Four intervene, Gorr dupes them into coming aboard his ship and transports them to Counter-Earth. Galactus attempts to destroy Counter-Earth, but is stopped by Impossible Man, who convinces him to destroy his own planet of Poppup. Gorr remains with the High Evolutionary as a valet.

== Gosamyr ==
Gosamyr is a supervillain turned superhero appearing in American comic books published by Marvel Comics. The character first appeared in The New Mutants #66 (August 1988), and was created by Louise Simonson and Bret Blevins.

Simonson said she was considering having Gosamyr reform and join the New Mutants, depending on how much Simonson liked her. Gosamyr was written out of the series with The New Mutants #74.

Gosamyr is an alien whose species has a humanoid appearance in their early stage. Once they reach adulthood, they cocoon themselves for several thousand years before emerging in monstrous forms. If released early, they can be powerful enough to destroy planets, even solar systems. The females of the species also have empathic powers which, even without intent, can cause conflict between even the closest of friends to the point of destruction. Provoking such conflict has evolved into the cultural norm for the species as a means of vying for dominance. As part of this, Gosamyr used her beauty to seduce male humans.

Gosamyr and the New Mutants follow Spyder to a planet where greed and the search for profit is the norm. On their space voyage, Gosamyr manipulates the New Mutants and causes conflict between them to establish herself as the alpha female of the group. Only Warlock, being a Technarch, is immune to her manipulations and suspects that Gosamyr is a threat before it is too late, and her manipulations have exposed Wolfsbane's repressed feelings for Lila's boyfriend Cannonball, caused Magik to lose control of her demonic essence, and brought the New Mutants to blows with each other. Magik breaks the spell by striking Gosamyr with her Soulsword. Now with Gosamyr as their prisoner, the New Mutants break into Spyder's palace to rescue Lila, but are captured by Spyder, who has been monitoring their progress and using Gosamyr's nature to lead them into a trap.

Gosamyr frees the New Mutants by using a trick which makes her invisible. They then discover that Gosamyr's family are in their cocoon stage and Spyder intends to force them out and kill them to use their bodies to make valuable textiles. Exiting their cocoons long before their time, the creatures grow with every passing minute and threaten to destroy the planet and its solar system. To prevent this, Lila apparently teleports them and herself into the Sun. Now orphaned, Gosamyr nonetheless accepts that Lila's killing her family was necessary.

Magik then uses her own teleportation powers to get the New Mutants and Gosamyr away from the planet and into Limbo, only to find themselves trapped there. Gosamyr remains on the fringes, using her emphatic power to keep the demons away from her. She no longer actively manipulates her companions, and though Warlock remains suspicious of her, New Mutants co-leader Mirage has forgiven her earlier misdeeds.

Gosamyr and her companions decide to take up residence in the spacecraft Ship, the ally and mobile headquarters of X-Factor. Upon scanning Gosamyr, Ship recognizes her species and tries to kill her. Though the New Mutants fight Ship to a standstill in her defense, the incident convinces Gosamyr that her nature makes her too much of a danger to the New Mutants and their friends. Ship informs her of a planet of mystics who might be able to teach her to curb her nature and provides her with a spacecraft with which to go there. Resolved to not cause any more harm to her friends, Gosamyr leaves Earth.

== Grasshopper ==
Grasshopper is the name of several characters in Marvel Comics.

=== Doug Taggert ===
The first Grasshopper is Doug Taggert, an employee of Roxxon who pines for fellow researcher Cindy Shelton. Later, it is clarified that Grasshopper is "part-time Roxxon security" who does "some super heroing on the side". Soon, Grasshopper meets up with the GLA as they both try to stop a robbery being committed by Batroc's Brigade. During the battle, Grasshopper agrees to join up with the GLA, but is immediately killed by Zaran.

=== Neil Shelton ===
Neil Shelton is a security guard for Roxxon who inherits the Grasshopper suit after Doug Taggert's death. While patrolling outside of Roxxon Labs on Christmas Day, Shelton defeated Killer Shrike (himself a former employee of Roxxon) during the villain's attempt to steal "Project Z". Cindy Shelton shows up to recover the "Project Z" device and, unaware that this is a new wearer of the suit, invites Grasshopper to dinner. Neil states to himself that he is secretly Cindy's brother and must deny her feelings. To escape Cindy's amorous advances, Neil initiates a "Maximum Jump", rocketing heroically into the air. It is later revealed that the jump propelled Grasshopper into space, killing him. Doorman collects Grasshopper's spirit while his body crashes back to Earth.

=== Third Grasshopper ===
Virtually no information was revealed about him other than his status as "The All-New Grasshopper" before a disgruntled Deadpool killed him by snapping his neck after being kicked out of the Great Lakes Initiative.

=== Skrull imposter ===
The fourth Grasshopper is a Skrull imposter who helped infiltrate Earth during Secret Invasion.

=== Fifth Grasshopper ===
The fifth Grasshopper is a member of the Great Lakes Avengers. Unlike the other Grasshoppers, he manages to survive past his initial appearance. During the storyline "Reckoning War", Grasshopper and the Great Lakes Avengers are attacked by Cormorant, who takes the legs off his suit to reassemble his armor.

=== Powers and abilities of Grasshopper ===
The first Grasshopper's powers are derived entirely from a powered suit, metallic green in color and with an appearance reminiscent of his namesake. The suit's primary ability is that of a powerful vertical leap, powered by long robotic legs. Its secondary abilities include "Insectroid Sensors", which work as an early warning system, and Zoom Lenses, which provide long range sight.

== Gray Goblin ==
Gray Goblin (sometimes spelled Grey Goblin) is the name of several characters in Marvel Comics.

=== Gray Goblin in other media ===
The Lily Hollister incarnation of Gray Goblin appears in Spider-Man: Edge of Time, voiced by Tara Strong.

== Great Gambonnos ==
The Great Gambonnos are characters appearing in American comic books published by Marvel Comics.

Ernesto and Luigi Gambonno were born in Milan, Italy. They are acrobats and aerialists working for the criminal organization, the Circus of Crime. They are identical twins and though they perceive themselves as the "Kings of the High Trapeze", they are defeated easily by Spider-Man and Daredevil who prove to be superior acrobats to the both of them.

=== Great Gambonnos in other media ===
The Great Gambonnos appear in the Avengers Assemble episode "Crime and Circuses", both voiced by Roger Craig Smith.

== Alia Gregor ==
Dr. Alia Gregor is a character appearing in American comic books for Marvel Comics. The character was created by Jonathan Hickman and Pepe Larraz, and first appeared in House of X #1 (July 2019).

Alia Gregor is a member of Orchis and the wife of Erasmus Mendel. She is the A.I. engineer of the Sentinel space station behind Mother Mold before being disillusioned by Cyclops and killed by Nimrod.

== Grendel ==
Grendel, also known as the Symbiote Dragon, is a character appearing in American comic books for Marvel Comics. The character first appeared in Venom (vol. 4) #1 (May 2018), and was created by Donny Cates and Ryan Stegman.

=== Symbiote Dragon ===
Grendel is a symbiote created by Knull billions of years in the past, sent out into the cosmos alongside its brethren to destroy and devour everything they came across. Arriving on Earth in the 6th century, it was subdued by Thor and imprisoned in a glacier, where it is exhumed by S.H.I.E.L.D. centuries later. Lying dormant for several decades, Grendel is indwelled by Knull and rampaged through New York, but is ultimately defeated by Eddie Brock / Venom.

=== Dark Carnage ===
Dark Carnage, also simply known as Carnage, is an offshoot of the Grendel symbiote. It initially bonded with the damaged form of Cletus Kasady / Carnage due a cult worshiping symbiote using Grendel's remnants which was stolen from the Maker. His form as Dark Carnage is a thirteen-foot-tall skeletal monster with Knull's spiral on its forehead and a white dragon/spider emblem on his chest, and effectively is a demigod possessing power far beyond what a regular symbiote bestows its host, due to his connections to Chthon and Knull.

After Eddie Brock becomes the King in Black, he tells Carnage that he is not welcome in the reformed Symbiote hive and sentences him to death. Carnage is swarmed by symbiote-controlled sharks and disappears. A piece of the symbiote survives and formulates a new plan to make a comeback using the power Knull had bequeathed it to create a rival Hive with itself as its nexus. Once all his soldiers were in place, Carnage directs his Hive to slaughter as many attending civilians as possible, but is opposed by Flash Thompson, Silence, Toxin and Sleeper. Carnage assimilates Extrembiote – a symbiote-dragon mutated by Extremis – before flying away.

=== Grendel in other media ===
- Grendel appears in the Spider-Man series finale "Maximum Venom". This version, also known as the Klyntar Dragon and World-Killer, was created from the remnants of All-Black the Necrosword following their death. It attacks New York City and attempts to destroy Earth, but is killed when Spider-Man and Max Modell destroy the Symbiote Seed that was empowering it.
- Dark Carnage appears as an alternate skin for Cletus Kasady / Carnage in Marvel: Future Fight.

== Grey Family ==
=== John and Elaine Grey ===
John and Elaine Grey appeared in early X-Men stories, first appearing in X-Men #5 (May 1964) and created by Stan Lee and Jack Kirby. They are the parents of Jean Grey and Sara Grey, among other children.

During the "End of Greys" story arc, Elaine and other relatives are killed by the Shi'ar Death Commandos.

==== John and Elaine Grey in other media ====
- John and Elaine Grey appear in X-Men: The Animated Series.
- John and Elaine Grey make a non-speaking cameo appearance in X-Men: Evolution.
- John Grey appears in Wolverine and the X-Men, voiced by Corey Burton. This version is an old friend of Professor X.
- John and Elaine Grey appear in X-Men: The Last Stand, portrayed by Adrian Hough and Desiree Zurowski.
- John and Elaine Grey appear in Dark Phoenix, portrayed by Scott Shepherd and Hannah Emily Anderson.

=== Sara Grey ===
Sara Grey-Bailey first appeared in Uncanny X-Men #136 (August 1980) and was created by writer Chris Claremont and artist John Byrne. She is the sister of Jean Grey-Summers.

Sara is killed by mutant hating extremists and absorbed into the Phalanx, leaving behind her mutant children (Gailyn and Joey Bailey). A replica of Sara is formed from a piece of the White Hot Room; this version of Sara is a mutant with the ability to unlock the potential within other mutants (a power that Claremont intended her to gain years prior, when he planned for her to join X-Factor). The entity creates a haven for mutants, but cosmic entities confront Sara and Jean about the imbalance Sara's existence causes. She then becomes Beacon, a guide for the gods to keep them compassionate.

==== Sara Grey in other media ====
- Sara Grey appears in X-Men: The Animated Series.
- Sara Grey makes non-speaking cameo appearances in X-Men: Evolution.
- Sara Grey appears in Spider-Man: Brand New Day, portrayed by Olivia Booth-Ford. This version is a mutant telepath who was abandoned alongside Jean Grey when Elaine discovered their shared mutated genetics. While training Jean to use telepathy at a park, Sara is arrested by the Department of Damage Control and eventually killed in their experiments.

== Grills ==
Gilbert, also known as "Grills", is a character appearing in American comic books published by Marvel Comics. The character was created by writer Matt Fraction and artist David Aja, and first appeared in Hawkeye vol. 4 #1 (August 2012).

=== Grills in other media ===
- Grills appears in Marvel's Avengers (2020).
- Grills appears in Hawkeye (2021), portrayed by Clayton English.

== Grim ==
Grim (Gilbert Manigo) is a criminal who operated as Grim while his brother Henry operated as Reaper. Both of them are members of Tombstone's gang.

== Petunia Grimm ==
Petunia Grimm is a character appearing in American comic books published by Marvel Comics. After being mentioned in Fantastic Four #25, she first appeared in Fantastic Four #238 where she was further developed by John Byrne.

Petunia Grimm is a nurse who is the favorite aunt of Ben Grimm.

=== Petunia in other media ===
Petunia appears in Spidey and His Amazing Friends episode "Hanukkah Heist", voiced by Jackie Hoffman.

== Grinder ==
Grinder is a character appearing in American comic books published by Marvel Comics. The character first appeared in Spider-Woman #26 (May 1980).

Brute Bashby was a criminal given special bladed weaponry and the identity of the Grinder. He was defeated by Spider-Woman.

== Grotesk ==
Grotesk is a character appear in American comic books published by Marvel Comics. He first appeared in The X-Men #41 (February 1968), and was created by Roy Thomas and Don Heck. The character was inspired by the Captain Marvel villain King Kull.

The character subsequently appears in Ms. Marvel #6 (June 1977) and #8 (August 1977), The Avengers Annual #20 (1991), Avengers West Coast Annual #6 (1991), Iron Man Annual #12 (1991), and Thor #481 (December 1994).

Prince Gor-Tok, also known as Grotesk, is the former prince of a warlike, civilized race of Gortokian Subterraneans with human intelligence and virtually human appearance. Underground atomic explosions created by surface humans led to the extinction of the entire race except for Grotesk, who, his mind and body first distorted by radiation, vows to destroy the entire surface world.

Grotesk encounters the heroic mutants the X-Men on his first foray to the surface world. He fights them and kills Changeling, who had been posing as Professor X.

== Grotto ==
- Further reading: Grotto at the Comic Book DB (archived from the original); Grotto at the Grand Comics Database

Grotto is a small-time criminal and the frequent partner of Turk Barrett. Like Barrett, he works for Eric Slaughter and the Kingpin, resulting in frequent encounters with Daredevil and Elektra. Although generally regarded as unintelligent, Grotto often tries to act as a voice of reason to Barrett's aggressive and overconfident behavior.

=== Grotto in other media ===
Grotto, legal name Elliot Grote, appears in the second season of Daredevil, portrayed by McCaleb Burnett. This version is a low-ranking member of the Kitchen Irish mob, serving as a driver and occasional assassin for their leader Nesbitt.

== Growing Man ==
The Growing Man

Publication information
- Publisher: Marvel Comics
- First appearance: The Mighty Thor #140 (May 1967)
- Created by: Stan Lee (Writer); Jack Kirby (Artist)

In-story information
- Species: Robot
- Team affiliations: Hydra
- Abilities: Kinetic growth; Superhuman strength and durability

The Growing Man is a character appearing in American comic books published by Marvel Comics. The character, first appearing in The Mighty Thor #140 (May 1967); and reappearing in The Avengers #69 (October 1969), was created by Stan Lee and Jack Kirby.

The Growing Man is an android built by an enslaved alien race on the time-traveling villain Kang the Conqueror's behalf. First appearing on Earth as an inert doll-sized figure, the android is found by New York police, reactivating and causing havoc until coming into conflict with Thor. The Growing Man is then deactivated and recovered by Kang who is in turn defeated by Thor. Kang also uses the Growing Man to abduct Tony Stark (the alter-ego of Iron Man) from a hospital. The superhero Avengers team (including Thor) attack the Growing Man and follow the android into the future, where they're involved in a competition between Kang and the Grandmaster. The alien colonizers of Rigel eventually find the Growing Man in one of Kang's abandoned vessels and send it back to Earth to use it against Iron Man who defeats the android by overloading its circuitry. The Growing Man reappears in the dimension of Limbo and attacks the Avenger Hercules, who hits it so hard that it collapses as its cells are overtaxed. Eventually, it finds its way to Earth, where temporary member Mister Fantastic devises a means of reversing the growing process, causing the android to shrink from sight.

The Growing Man is found and reactivated by Hydra. Hydra's leader Baron Strucker orders the android to attack New York as part of a ploy to destroy the Thunderbolts team. The heroes manage to defeat the android by forcing it to grow large enough that the team could hack its circuitry and shut it down. However, this also activate a beacon in its circuitry that will warn the ancestors of the original aliens of Kang's coming. Kang uses another variation of the android when attempting to track his younger self, with this version splitting into several smaller versions once hit with sufficient force, but they all withdraw once the young Kang identifies himself. An upgraded form is sent by Hydra to disrupt a political rally, but is stopped when its powers are overloaded.

=== Growing Man in other media ===
- The Growing Man appears in the Avengers Assemble episode "The Thunderbolts", voiced by Travis Willingham. This version is a stimuloid that Justin Hammer modified with stolen Stark Industries technology.
- Growing Man androids appear in the X-Men/Spider-Man crossover trilogy Time's Arrow.

== Guillotine ==
Guillotine (Jeannine Sauvage) is a mystic character appearing in American comic books published by Marvel Comics. Guillotine has no superpowers but is an expert swordswoman and wields the mystic La Fleur du Mal, a sword with dark supernatural powers (the sword name means literally "The Flower of Evil" in French). Born of a mixed French-Algerian heritage, she is the latest in her bloodline to inherit the sword. The character was conceived by writer Al Ewing and the full design was developed by Kabam art director Gabriel Frizzera and artist Paco Medina. She first appeared in the second volume of Contest of Champions released October 7, 2015 (cover dated December 2015). Shortly after, she made her debut in the game Marvel: Contest of Champions. In 2017, Guillotine was briefly featured in the title U.S.Avengers.

In 1793, an ancestor of Sauvage, Jean Desmarais, found the mythical Fleur du Mal sword in the Paris catacombs when escaping the authorities for being a revolutionary. Since then, it was passed on to his descendants with the most recent one being Jeannine Sauvage. Jeannine discovered the sword at age twelve by being lured to a room that was usually locked by a voice. While inspecting the sword, she slit her finger with its edge, and the blood dripped into the sword. This caused Jeannine to become cursed to wield this sword like her ancestors before her. During the Secret Empire storyline, Guillotine appears as a member of the Champions of Europe alongside Ares, Captain Britain, Excalibur, Outlaw, and Peregrine. With help from Squirrel Girl and Enigma, the team manages to liberate Paris, France from Hydra occupation.

=== Guillotine in other media ===
Guillotine appears as a playable character in Marvel: Contest of Champions.

== Guthrie family ==
=== Jebediah Guthrie ===
Jebediah Guthrie first appeared in Rom Annual #2 (September 1984), and was created by Bill Mantlo and William Johnson. Jebediah was a mutant like his siblings, with the power of producing blasts of electrical plasma out of his eyes. Unlike his siblings, he never associated with the X-Men and was depowered on M-Day.

=== Melody Guthrie ===
Melody Guthrie is the younger sister of Cannonball (Sam Guthrie), Husk (Paige Guthrie), and Icarus (Josh Guthrie). Her father dies early in her life due to black lung disease. Melody is seen in multiple issues of the New Mutants, living at their Kentucky farm.

Melody later gains her mutant powers to fly, taking the codename Aero and joining the Xavier Institute. Melody loses her abilities on "M-Day" and moves back home. Melody is the first mutant to undergo a Krakoan ritual called the Crucible, where she is killed by Apocalypse and resurrected with her powers restored.
