= Shared =

Shared may refer to:

- related to sharing, the joint use of a resource or space
- Shared, Iran, a village in Qazvin Province

== See also ==
- Share (disambiguation)
- Shard (disambiguation)
