= Xavier's Security Enforcers =

Marvel Comics superhero team

- Cover of the first issue of X.S.E.

Publication information
- Publisher: Marvel Comics
- First appearance: Uncanny X-Men #282 (November 1991)
- Created by: Whilce Portacio; John Byrne; Art Thibert

In-story information
- Base(s): Various
- Member(s): Amazon; Archer; Bishop; Trevor Fitzroy; Fixx; Greystone; Hecate; Malcolm; Randall; Recoil; Shard; Sureshot; Trace

Xavier's Security Enforcers (also known as the XSE) are a superhero team/police force appearing in American comic books published by Marvel Comics. The characters are depicted as being from the fictional 2070s, a time ruled by mutant hunting/killing robots called Sentinels, who at this point in time had run amok, essentially ruling Earth in order to carry out their objective to protect humanity. The XSE is formed by Hecat'e in the fallout of the Gene War (a conflict first mentioned in X-Treme X-Men #4) and the Summers Rebellion, during which mutants and humans join forces to defeat the Sentinels.

== Publication history ==
The team was featured in the eponymous 1996 limited series XSE, which was followed by the 1998 mini-series Bishop: XSE.

== Fictional team history ==
The XSE is a team of mutants dedicated to bringing criminal mutants to justice. Initially called the Xavier's School Enforcers, the team was named after Professor Charles Xavier because the members of the XSE believe in his ideals. The team was apparently founded by the mutant Forge, in this era known as Genesis.

Notable members of the team's original roster include Archer, Bishop, Trevor Fitzroy, Fixx, Greystone, Malcolm, Randall, and Bishop's younger sibling Shard. In the XSE, Bishop led Randall and Malcolm, and the three men were known as the Omega Squad. Shard was also a member of the Omega Squad until her promotion to Lieutenant. Bishop had turned down several promotions in order to stay with his team, leading to her outranking him. She was later killed in the line of duty.

Fitzroy dropped out of the XSE and turned against them. Years later, he opened a portal through time before traveling to Earth-616, the present setting of the X-Men universe, with a group of mutant criminals. This led the Omega Squad to follow them to the same timeline, where they encountered the X-Men. Due to the time-traveling abilities of Fitzroy, Bishop and a holographic version of Shard then stayed in the present, and Malcolm and Randall were killed.

Bishop became a member of Storm's Gold Team when the X-Men split their large team roster into a Blue and a Gold Team. Shard, once carried on a holographic projector by Bishop, regained sentience due to a computer virus and previous tinkering of Forge. Shard eventually became a member of the government-funded X-Factor team.

Disgruntled by XSE tactics and the world they lived in, Archer, Fixx, and Greystone became members of a splinter team of "rogues" called the X.U.E. (Xavier's Underground Enforcers). They wished to travel back in time to prevent their era from happening. Shard also joined their ranks for a brief period.

While a member of the X.U.E., Shard was mentally linked to Fixx, a mutant with psionic abilities. This link allowed for the spirits of the X.U.E. (who are all linked to each other in like fashion) to enter present-day Earth and complete their mission from the future.

Bishop later became part of a team of X-Men known briefly as the X-Treme Sanctions Executive. He developed misgivings about his role in the present because he did not want to accidentally help create a version of the future he preferred to prevent. However, that notion fell away, along with the XSE's government-sanctioned role, after M-Day.

== Members ==
Character	First appearance	Notes
Trevor Fitzroy	Uncanny X-Men #281 (August 1991)	Member that trained alongside Bishop and Shard. He was killed but resurrected by Layla Miller without a soul and became a criminal. He later escaped to the past, pursued by the Omega Squad.
Bishop (Lucas Bishop)	Uncanny X-Men #282 (November 1991)	The leader of the Omega Squad. He later became a member of various X-teams. He has the mutant ability to absorb, store, and redirect energy.
Malcolm	Uncanny X-Men #282 (November 1991)	Member of the Omega Squad; killed by criminals in Uncanny X-Men #287. Mutant ability of sensing whether someone was baseline human or not.
Randall	Uncanny X-Men #282 (November 1991)	Member of the Omega Squad; killed by criminals in Uncanny X-Men #287. Mutant ability to absorb harmful radiation and convert it into a harmless form.
Shackle (Shirley Baylor)	Uncanny X-Men #287 (February 1992)	Shirley was a cadet with Bishop, Shard, and Fitzroy. She left the X.S.E to become a bodyguard for the Witness and took the name Shackle.
Shard (Shard Bishop)	Uncanny X-Men #314 (July 1994)	Bishop's younger sister. Killed in line of duty but survived on as a hologram in Bishop's technology. She had the mutant ability of manipulating light as attacks.
Amazon	Bishop #3 (December 1994)	
Recoil	Bishop #3 (December 1994)	
Hecat'e	XSE #1 (September 1996)	Mutant ability to project a fear-inducing darkness from her eyes.
Sureshot	XSE #1 (September 1996)	Mutant ability of enhanced vision, allowing her to accurately predict ricochets. Killed by Emplates in XSE #2 (October 1996).
Trace	XSE #1 (September 1996)	Killed by Emplates in XSE #2 (October 1996).
Greystone (Devlin Greystone); inhabited body of Brian Young	X-Factor #140 (October 1997)	One of three X.U.E members who traveled back in time into the bodies of dead people. The trio joined the X-Factor after Greystone attempted to kill the younger version of the man who killed his mother. He died after a failed attempt to return to his future in X-Factor #149 (July 1998). Mutant ability to augment his body mass, size, density, durability, stamina and strength.
Archer; inhabited body of Jude Black	X-Factor #140 (October 1997)	Member of the X.U.E; joined after death of his wife and child. He retired from X-Factor to pursue a life in the present. Mutant ability to convert body into energy and use as attacks.
Fixx	X-Factor #140 (October 1997)	Member of the X.U.E. Her whereabouts are unknown. Mutant ability of psionic sprites that allow for telepathy, telekinesis, and chronoskimming that allowed her to take the X.U.E. members back in time.

== In other media ==
Xavier's Security Enforcers appear in X-Men: The Animated Series, consisting of Forge, Bishop, Shard, and Wolverine.

== Reception ==
- Comic Book Resources ranked Xavier's Security Enforcer 3rd in "16 X-Men Teams You Totally Forgot About", 11th in "X-23: 15 Directions To Take The Character After The Logan Movie", and 8th in "Darkest Alternate X-Men Versions In Marvel Comics".
