= X-Men: Mojo World =

1996 video game

- Game Gear cover art
- Developer: Sega
- Publishers: Sega; Tec Toy (Master System)
- Designer: Jerry Markota
- Composer: Paul Hutchinson
- Platforms: Game Gear, Master System
- Release: Game Gear: NA: September 27, 1996; Master System: BRA: 1996
- Genre: Action
- Mode: Single-player

X-Men: Mojo World is a video game released in 1996 on the Game Gear system. The game starts off with Wolverine and Rogue as playable X-Men; Gambit, Cyclops, Havok, and Shard can be unlocked later on. The game shares the same engine as its predecessor, X-Men: Gamesmaster's Legacy. The game was also released for the Master System in Brazil by Tec Toy.

== Plot ==
Spiral, a denizen of Mojo World and servant of Mojo, pits the X-Men against their enemies in a televised slugfest, "The Greatest Battles of the X-Men". If her scheme works, the citizens of Mojo World will tune-in and she will become their new ruler.

== Gameplay ==
The game is split up into two parts, with four stages in the first part where players rescue their captured teammates, and two stages in the second part. The bosses include one of the Warwolves, Magneto, Master Mold, Trevor Fitzroy, the Agent, and Mojo.

The character lineup for the game is Wolverine, Rogue, Gambit, Cyclops, Havok, and Shard.

== Reception ==
The four reviewers of Electronic Gaming Monthly said that the graphics are strong and there is a good selection of characters, but the game is not fun to play due to its clichéd mechanics, frustrating platforming, and enemies which take a tiresome number of hits to kill. Only Sushi-X defended the game, saying it "is not a great game, but it's interesting enough to be worth the cost for players who refuse to let the Game Gear die." They scored it a 4.5 out of 10. A brief review in GamePro described the game as "above-average".
