= Falafel Inc. =

Restaurant chain in Washington, D.C. area

- Interactive map of Falafel Inc.

Restaurant information
- Established: May 13, 2017; 9 years ago
- Owner: Ahmad Ashkar
- Food type: Middle Eastern
- Location: Washington, D.C., United States
- Coordinates: 38°54′19.7″N 77°3′55.2″W
- Website: https://www.falafelinc.org

Falafel Inc. is a fast casual Middle Eastern restaurant chain in the Washington metropolitan area. The restaurant was founded by Ahmad Ashkar in May 2017, with the first location opening in the Georgetown neighborhood of Washington, D.C. The chain has locations in Washington, D.C., Maryland, Virginia, and California. The chain donates the cost to feed a refugee for one day to the World Food Programme for every US$10 in revenue.

== History ==
Palestinian American businessperson Ahmad Ashkar began working on the concept for Falafel Inc. in 2015. Prior to developing Falafel Inc., Ashkar worked as an investment banker on Wall Street. In 2009, he founded of the social entrepreneurship Hult Prize Foundation and worked as its CEO. Ashkar also sat on the advisory board of the United Nations Development Programme. He co-owned a barbecue restaurant and was an investor in The Halal Guys. Ashkar stated that he wanted to create a company to help refugees and pledged to donate the cost to feed a refugee for one day, 50¢ as of 2017, to the World Food Programme through ShareTheMeal for every US$10 in revenue. He decided to develop a falafel-focused restaurant due to the prevalence of falafel in refugee camps.

The restaurant's first location opened on May 13, 2017 in the Georgetown neighborhood of Washington, D.C. By June 2017, the restaurant had donated enough to feed 10,000 refugees. The restaurant's second location opened at The Wharf in the summer of 2018. A location opened at Tysons Corner Center in Tysons, Virginia in September 2019. A location in Westwood, Los Angeles opened in July 2021. It opened a location in Old Town Alexandria, Virginia in October 2022. In October 2023, it opened a location at National Landing in Crystal City, Virginia. In May 2024, it opened a location at the Mosaic District in Merrifield, Virginia. Its first Maryland location opened in November 2024 at the Westfield Montgomery in Bethesda. A location in Woodley Park, Washington, D.C. opened in February 2025. It opened a location at Pike & Rose in North Bethesda, Maryland in April 2025. It opened a location in One Loudoun, Virginia in August 2025. It opened a location in Duke Street, Alexandria, Virginia in March 2026.

== Food ==
Falafel Inc. serves Middle Eastern food in a fast casual setting. Its main items are falafel sandwiches and salads. Sides include tabouli salad, Pali salad, cucumber salad, and za'atar fries. The restaurant prepares six sauces, including a garlic sauce, a red sauce, and a "habibi" sauce. Drinks include Vimto and Barbican.

Many of the restaurant's recipes originate from Ashkar's mother. The restaurant's za'atar spice blend is imported from a farm in Palestine owned by Ashkar's aunt.

== Accolades ==
The restaurant was awarded Washington City Paper's Best Falafel Restaurant award from 2019 to 2025. It was ranked #31 on Yelp's Top 100 US Restaurants in 2023.
