= Ridesharing =

Ridesharing or rideshare may refer to:

- Carpool
- Vanpool
- Rideshare payload, a smaller-sized payload transported to orbit with a primary payload
- Ridesharing company, a company that matches passengers with drivers of vehicles for hire via websites and mobile apps; also known as "peer-to-peer ridesharing"
