= Shard (character) =

Shard Bishop
- Shard as depicted in X-Factor #147 (July 1998). Art by Mike S. Miller.

Publication information
- Publisher: Marvel Comics
- First appearance: (Illusion) Uncanny X-Men Annual #17 (December 1993) (First full appearance) Uncanny X-Men #314 (July 1994)
- Created by: Scott Lobdell (writer); John Romita Jr. (artist)

In-story information
- Species: Human mutant (formerly); Hologram (currently)
- Team affiliations: Xavier Security Enforcers; X-Factor
- Partnerships: Chronomancer
- Notable aliases: Askante
- Abilities: Intangibility (holographic Shard only); Energy blasts

Shard Bishop is a character appearing in American comic books published by Marvel Comics. Created by writer Scott Lobdell and artist John Romita Jr., the character first appeared in The Uncanny X-Men #314 (July 1994). Shard belongs to the subspecies of humans called mutants, who are born with superhuman abilities. She possesses the ability to manipulate light into energy blasts.

Shard is the younger sister of the X-Man Bishop, originating from a future in which mutants are hunted or placed in concentration camps. She initially serves as a member of the Xavier Security Enforcers before joining the present-day X-Factor as a hologram.

Since her introduction in comics, the character has been featured in various other Marvel-licensed products, including video games and animated television series. Shard appears in X-Men: The Animated Series, voiced by Sandi Ross.

== Publication history ==
Shard Bishop debuted in The Uncanny X-Men #314 (July 1994), created by Scott Lobdell and John Romita Jr.. She subsequently appeared in several Marvel series, including X-Men (1991), X-Factor (1997), Bishop the Last X-Man (1999), and Bishop (2026).

== Fictional character biography ==
Shard is a Lieutenant in Xavier's Security Enforcers (X.S.E.) with her older brother Lucas Bishop in the 2080s. Shard was born and raised in a mutant concentration camp, in which mutants were branded over their right eyes with the letter "M" for recognition. In Uncanny X-Men Annual #17, Shard is stated as having the mutant ability of "transubbing ambient light into concussive force".

Shard becomes the youngest X.S.E. graduate a year after Bishop attains the position. She serves under Bishop as a member of the Omega Squad (which included Bishop and his officers, Randall and Malcolm), until her promotion.

Together in the X.S.E., Shard and Bishop are responsible for apprehending criminal mutants. During a battle, Shard is partially infected with a vampire-like affliction originating from the present-day mutant Emplate. Bishop takes Shard to the New York Stark/Fujikawa building to save her life by transmitting her essence into a holographic matrix. Shard's physical body dies, while her essence survives in the matrix.

Bishop eventually travels to the present day to track down Trevor Fitzroy, one of his time's most wanted criminals and Shard's ex-lover. Shard is recreated as a computer construct and joins the government-sponsored team X-Factor.

After X-Factor disbands, Shard is transported into an alternate future. There, she is killed a second time while saving Bishop from Trevor Fitzroy.

== Powers and abilities ==
Shard possesses the ability to absorb ambient light particles from her environment and transform them into blasts of raw concussive force. As a photonic lifeform, she exists as a "living hologram" and can become intangible at will.

== Reception ==
Darren Franich of Entertainment Weekly ranked Shard 75th in his "Let's Rank Every X-Man Ever" list, stating that she was ranked relatively highly "mainly because she looked cool."

== In other media ==
- Shard appears in X-Men: The Animated Series, voiced by Sandi Ross.
- Shard appears in X-Men '97, voiced by Kimberly Woods.
- Shard appears as an unlockable playable character in X-Men: Mojo World.
