= Trevor Fitzroy =

- Trevor Fitzroy

Publication information
- Publisher: Marvel Comics
- First appearance: The Uncanny X-Men #281 (October 1991)
- Created by: John Byrne; Jim Lee; Whilce Portacio

In-story information
- Species: Human Mutant
- Team affiliations: Xavier's Security Enforcers; Upstarts; Hellfire Club; Summers Rebellion
- Notable aliases: Chronomancer, White Rook
- Abilities: Life energy absorption; Portal generation; Time travel

Trevor Fitzroy is a supervillain appearing in American comic books published by Marvel Comics. The character is usually depicted as an enemy of the X-Men, in particular Bishop. Created by Jim Lee and Whilce Portacio, he first appeared in The Uncanny X-Men #281 (October 1991).

Fitzroy hails from the same dystopian future as Bishop. A mutant criminal, he possesses the ability to absorb energy from human beings and use that energy to open time portals, which is how Bishop traveled to the present. He has since been featured as the main adversary in the series featuring Bishop.

== Fictional character biography ==
=== The future ===
Trevor Fitzroy is the illegitimate son of Anthony Shaw, the future Black King of the Hellfire Club, in a dystopian future. He joins the Academy for Xavier's Security Enforcers (XSE) and has a romantic relationship with Shard. However, Fitzroy's criminal tendencies surface, resulting in his expulsion from the academy. Initially, his influential father attempts to shield him, but when Fitzroy is apprehended for murder, his father could no longer protect him. Bishop (Shard's brother and an XSE officer) captures Fitzroy.

Initially, Fitzroy believed that he possessed the ability to teleport. However, a clandestine faction of XSE agents called the Xavier's Underground Enforcers (XUE) uncover his true power of time travel. The XUE recruit Shard and orchestrate Fitzroy's release, intending to exploit his temporal abilities to alter the past and create a better future. Shard, recognizing Fitzroy's inherent danger, intervened and thwarted their plan, resulting in Fitzroy's return to prison.

=== The Upstarts ===
From prison, Fitzroy escaped to the present time with his mutant minion Bantam. There, he became involved with a group known as the Upstarts, a competition set up by Selene to eliminate her rivals in the Hellfire Club.

Fitzroy attacks X-Force, demanding they turn over Rictor and Warpath. In the ensuing confrontation, Cable tricks Fitzroy by disguising his techno-organic arm as wholly organic. When Fitzroy attempts to absorb Cable's energy through the arm, his powers backfire and cause him to use his own life energy to open a portal, seemingly killing him.

=== After the Upstarts ===
Fitzroy eventually reappears under the thrall of Selene as the White Rook of the Hellfire Club. During this time, he cooperates with Pierce and Shaw, despite his previous attempts to kill them. He leaves the club and travels back to an alternate future (Earth-9910), now calling himself the Chronomancer. He takes control of the new timeline, but Bishop arrives and fights Fitzroy, eventually killing him.

=== X-Factor ===
A younger, benevolent version of Fitzroy appears as a participant in the Summers Rebellion. After Cortex kills Fitzroy during a fight, Layla Miller resurrects him. She is unable to restore Fitzroy's soul, establishing the point at which he becomes a villain.

=== Return of the Upstarts ===
In X-Men (vol. 7), Fitzroy resurfaces and begins killing mutants, which he live-streams on social media.

== Powers and abilities ==
Fitzroy possesses the mutant ability to drain the life force of living beings through physical contact. With these energies, Fitzroy can create portals that can teleport those passing through them across time and space, yet the portals are one way; trying to pass through the wrong way results in the traveler's body being fatally transformed. He was often dependent on the mutant Bantam to direct and catalog his portals.

In early appearances, Fitzroy wore futuristic battle armor that increased his strength. This battle armor was destroyed by the X-Men, and a second suit of armor was destroyed by the X-Force.

Fitzroy also had several Sentinels that obeyed his commands. These Sentinels were smaller than the 20th-century type but could repair themselves using material in their vicinity.

== Other versions ==
Trevor Fitzroy appears in X-Men '92.

== In other media ==
=== Television ===
Trevor Fitzroy and Bantam as depicted in X-Men: The Animated Series.

Trevor Fitzroy appears in the X-Men: The Animated Series episode "One Man's Worth", voiced by an uncredited actor. This version's energy-absorbing abilities are non-lethal, leaving victims comatose for several days. Hailing from Bishop's future, Fitzroy made deal with Master Mold for a luxurious life if he used his powers to go back in time and kill Professor Xavier before he founded the X-Men. However, Master Mold planned to double cross him by using Nimrod; forcing Fitz to team up with Bishop, Shard and alternate versions of Logan and Storm to destroy Nimrod.

=== Video games ===
- Trevor Fitzroy appears as a boss in X-Men: Gamesmaster's Legacy.
- Trevor Fitzroy appears as a boss in X-Men: Mojo World.
- Trevor Fitzroy appears as the final boss of Wolverine: Adamantium Rage.

=== Merchandise ===
Toy Biz produced an action figure of Trevor Fitzroy in 1994 as part of the fourth X-Men wave.
