= Cher (disambiguation) =

Cher (born 1946) is an American entertainer.

Cher may also refer to:

== People with the name ==
=== Surname ===
- Oskar Cher (1913–1942), Estonian communist
- Cheyenne Cher, stage name of American female professional wrestler Dee Chocktoot, one of The Cheerleaders from the Gorgeous Ladies of Wrestling

=== Given name ===
- Cher Butler (born 1965), American model and actress
- Cher Calvin (born 1974), American news presenter
- Cher Coulter (born 1976), British fashion designer
- Cher Korver (born 1976), Dutch wheelchair basketball player
- Cher Lloyd (born 1993), English singer, rapper
- Cher Ndour (born 2004), Senegalese-Italian footballer
- Cher Ng (born 1972), Singaporean DJ
- Cher Scarlett (born 1985), American software engineer, writer, and labor activist
- Cher Sesma, American lineage society leader
- Cher Strauberry (born 1992), American skateboarder and musician, cofounder of Glue Skateboards along with Leo Baker
- Cher van Slobbe (born 1995), Dutch cricketer
- Cher Wang (born 1958), Taiwanese entrepreneur and philanthropist

=== Characters ===
- Cher Winters, a fictional character from Hollyoaks
- Cher Horowitz, the main character in Clueless

== Other ==
- Chér (1966 album)
- Chér (1971 album), later retitled Gypsys, Tramps & Thieves
- Cher (1987 album)
- Cher (TV series), a 1975 television show
- Cher (concert residency), a 2008–2011 concert series
- Cher (department), a department in France
- Cher (river), a river in France
- Chère, another (northwest) French river
- Cher, Iran, a village in West Azerbaijan Province, Iran
- CHER-FM, a Canadian radio station
- Cherokee syllabary (ISO 15924 code)

== See also ==
- Sonny & Cher, a pop duo from 1964 to 1975, one of whom was Cher
