= Upstarts (comics) =

Fictional comic book group

Publication information
- Publisher: Marvel Comics
- First appearance: Uncanny X-Men #281 (1991)
- Created by: Jim Lee; Whilce Portacio

In-story information
- Member(s): Gamesmaster (arbiter); Fabian Cortez; Shinobi Shaw; Trevor Fitzroy; Siena Blaze; Graydon Creed; Fenris (probational members); Selene (non-member founder)

The Upstarts are a group of supervillains appearing in American comic books published by Marvel Comics. The characters have strong ties to the Hellfire Club. They first appeared in Uncanny X-Men #281 and were created by Jim Lee and Whilce Portacio.

== Fictional team biography ==
The Upstarts are part of a secret competition founded by Selene, the Black Queen of the Hellfire Club, who intends to test potential members for her own Inner Circle. Overseen by the Gamesmaster, the Upstarts try to kill as many mutants as possible, with points being rewarded based on the mutant's power and notoriety.

Shinobi Shaw takes an early lead by killing his father Sebastian Shaw. Trevor Fitzroy gains membership after killing Donald Pierce and the Reavers, and goes on to kill most of the Hellions. Fitzroy demands the ring that signifies leadership of the Upstarts from Shaw, but Shaw refuses.

Over the next few months, the Upstarts attempt to kill as many mutants as possible, but with no success. In an attempt to reinvigorate the competition, the Gamesmaster targets the surviving members of the New Mutants and Hellions. This competition brings the Upstarts into conflict with the New Warriors and X-Force. The Upstarts manage to capture most of their targets, but Paige Guthrie convinces the Gamesmaster to play another game: instead of killing mutants, the Upstarts should find and train young mutants like herself. The Gamesmaster is intrigued and cancels the competition, with the Upstarts disbanding shortly afterwards.

The Upstarts return in the series X-Men (2024), now led by Trevor Fitzroy.

== Members ==
- Gamesmaster (arbiter)
- Selene
- Fabian Cortez
- Shinobi Shaw
- Trevor Fitzroy
- Siena Blaze
- Graydon Creed
- Fenris
