= Timeshare (disambiguation) =

A timeshare is a property with a particular form of shared ownership or use rights.

Timeshare, time-share, or time share may also refer to:

- Time Share (2000 film), a television film
- Time Share (2018 film), a Mexican thriller-drama film
- Time-sharing, shared use of a computing resource
- Timeshares (band), an American rock band
- "Time Share", an episode of the sitcom The King of Queens
- "Time Share (Suite 509)", a song by Estelle from True Romance

== See also ==
- Tymshare, a time-sharing service
