= ShareTheMeal =

Fundraising app of the World Food Programme

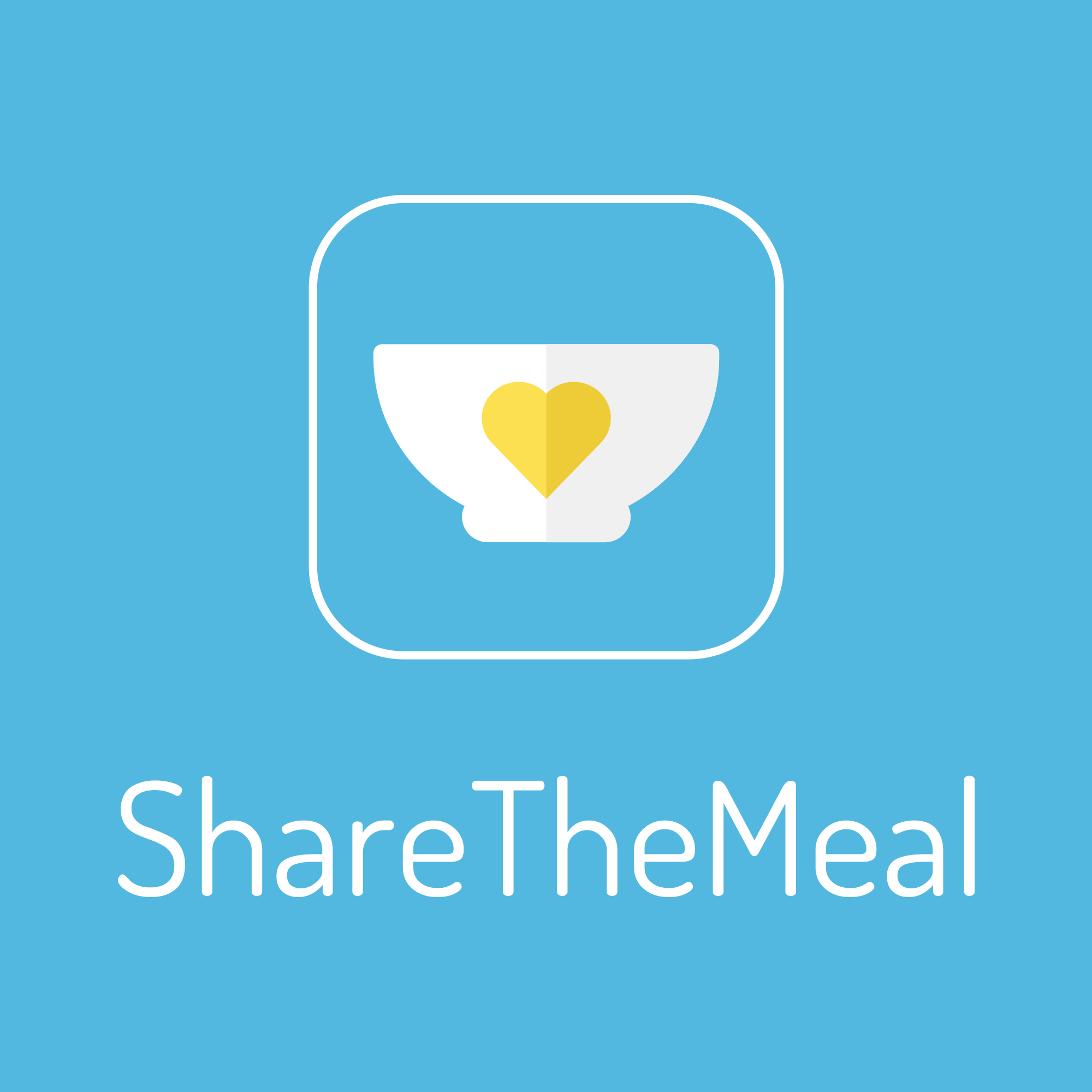
- Developers: Sebastian Stricker, Bernhard Kowatsch
- Release: 2014
- Website: https://sharethemeal.org/

ShareTheMeal is a crowdfunding smartphone application to fight global hunger through the United Nations World Food Programme (WFP). It enables users to make small donations to specific WFP projects and to track its progress. In 2020, ShareTheMeal was selected as one of the "Best Apps" globally by Apple and Google. As of November 2023, ShareTheMeal has over 200 million meals shared from 1.4 million app users.

== History ==
Sebastian Stricker and Bernhard Kowatsch founded ShareTheMeal in April 2014 in Berlin during a sabbatical as an independent startup.

Since the summer of 2015, ShareTheMeal has been officially part of WFP and supported by the Innovation Accelerator of WFP. ShareTheMeal ran a pilot in Germany, Austria, and Switzerland in the summer of 2015 providing 1.8 million school meals to children in Lesotho through stories, videos, and images pioneered by Tsitsi Matope in WFP Lesotho, which was the app's first fundraising target.

The app launched globally on November 12, 2015, for iOS and Android devices. The global launch campaign raised funds to give school meals to 20,000 Syrian children living in the Zaatari refugee camp in Jordan for one year. It was successfully completed in less than two months.

The app allowed users to donate 40 cents, enough to provide a meal for a child in Africa, at the tap of a finger.

Between January and April 2016, ShareTheMeal raised funds to support 2,000 mothers and their babies in Homs, Syria, for a full year. In the spring of 2016, the app raised funds to support 1,400 Syrian refugee children between the ages of three and four in Beirut. The goal was completed in less than seven weeks.

In February 2018 ShareTheMeal launched The Table, a unique peer-to-peer monthly giving program. Using SCOPE, WFP's beneficiary management tool, members are paired with a unique family each month via real-time data. Monthly donors directly support families with cash assistance, so that they can purchase the food that best suits their family's needs. As of April 2020, there are over 20,000 monthly active subscribers.

The donations are used as follows: 62% goes to families in need, 28% is invested into fundraising and marketing, 6% to help run the organisation and 4% covers payment fees.

== Awards and endorsements ==
Since launching in 2015, ShareTheMeal has gained public recognition from various organizations and corporations.

- ShareTheMeal won the Lead Academy's LeadAward for Startup of the Year in November 2015.
- It was included in Google's Best Apps of 2015 collection and was part of Google's 2015 Christmas Theme collection.
- It won the Innovation Interactive Award at SxSW for the New Economy category in March 2016.
- It won the People's Voice award at the 20th Annual Webby Awards in the Mobile Sites & Apps Best Practices category in April 2016.
- It was nominated for the Classy Award as One of the Most Innovative Nonprofits and Social Enterprises of 2016.
- It won the 2016 Lovie Awards in the Mobile & Applications Best Practices category.
- It was awarded three Shorty Social Good Awards, including "NGO of the Year", in November 2016.
- It was selected by Google as one of the Best Apps of 2016.
- It won the Google Play Award for Best Social Impact at Google I/O in May 2017.
