= Hellfire Gala =

2021 Marvel Comics storyline

- Hellfire Gala Red Carpet Edition direct market cover. Art by Russell Dauterman.

Publication information
- Publisher: Marvel Comics
- Genre: Superhero
- Publication date: June 2021 – July 2025
- No. of issues: 12
- Main character: X-Men

Collected editions
- X-Men: Hellfire Gala Red Carpet Edition: ISBN 978-1302931568
- X-Men: Hellfire Gala: ISBN 978-1302931155

"Hellfire Gala" was initially a 12-part X-Men comic book storyline published by Marvel Comics in June 2021. It is the first storyline featured in the "Reign of X" relaunch after the "X of Swords" storyline. Krakoa opens its gates to non-mutants to celebrate mutant culture at an evening party. The gala unveiled the new team of X-Men and showcased the terraforming of Mars into Planet Arakko.

It subsequently became an annual event in the Krakoan Age with the one-shots X-Men: Hellfire Gala #1 published in July 2022 and X-Men Hellfire Gala 2023 #1 published in July 2023. In the lead up to each Hellfire Gala, Marvel conducted a fan vote to decide on members of the new X-Men team. The subsequent publishing initiative, X-Men: From the Ashes, revisited the Hellfire Gala concept as a memorial for Krakoa in X-Men: Hellfire Vigil #1 published in July 2025. The gala returned in X-Men: The Hellfire Murder, which released in July 2026.

== Publication history ==
=== Hellfire Gala (2021) ===
The Hellfire Gala and an X-Men election was initially teased in issues such as Marauders #7 and #10 and X-Men #16. In January 2021, Marvel then announced a fan election to choose the members of the new Krakoan X-Men team. In April 2021, the team roster was revealed: Cyclops, Jean Grey, Polaris, Sunfire, Synch, Wolverine, and Rogue. An in-universe election was also held which showcased how various mutants voted and reactions to the results.

These X-Men would debut in Planet-Sized X-Men #1 (June 2021), written by Gerry Duggan with art by Pepe Larraz, during the twelve part Hellfire Gala event storyline. The Hellfire Gala was inspired by the Met Gala; Russell Dauterman designed the costumes for many of the X-Men characters who appeared in the event. In addition, the Hellfire Gala had Marvel Comics caricatures of actual celebrities as attendees to the event, including Scott Adsit, Pete Alonso, Steve Aoki, Saquon Barkley, DMC, Eminem, Kevin Feige, Nick Foles, Coco Gauff, Ira Glass, Jon Hamm, James Monroe Iglehart, Gabriel Iglesias, Aaron Judge, Jimmy Kimmel, Method Man, Jason Mantzoukas, Marc Maron, George R. R. Martin, Killer Mike, Alex Morgan, Seth Meyers, Conan O'Brien, Patton Oswalt, El-P, Adrianne Palicki, Megan Rapinoe, Paul Scheer, and Taboo. During the Gala, the X-Men work with mutants from Arakko to terraform Mars, establishing the planet as a mutant home.

Scarlet Witch is murdered during the gala, leading into the series Trial of Magneto.

=== Hellfire Gala (2022) ===
During Marvel's X-Men Comic-Con At Home panel on SDCC 2021, the X-Men creative team agreed that an annual Hellfire Gala and X-Men vote were warranted.

A second X-Men election was announced with results revealed in the second Hellfire Gala. The one-shot issue addressed the resurrection protocols becoming public knowledge and announced the new roster comprising Cyclops, Marvel Girl, Synch, Firestar, Magik, Forge, Havok, and Iceman.

A Marvel Comics caricature of Jon Hamm appeared as one of the Hellfire Gala attendees.

The mutant resurrection protocols remained a secret from the world until X-Men #12 (June 2022), during the Destiny of X phase, when reporter Ben Urich broke the news of the mutant resurrection in the Daily Bugle after interviewing Cyclops. The attendees of the Hellfire Gala ended up focusing on this revelation when the event "was meant to highlight mutant contributions to medicine". Emma Frost "telepathically conducted the second annual X-Men election. It was also revealed that she had a relationship with Jon Hamm in the past. While Rogue, Laura Kinney's Wolverine, Polaris, and Sunfire stepped away from the team, Cyclops, Jean Grey, and Synch successfully asked to be re-elected. After Firestar was nominated to join the group, Forge, Havok, Magik, and Iceman were also elected to round out the team".

=== Hellfire Gala (2023) ===
During Marvel's Judgment Day panel on SDCC 2022, Nick Lowe and C.B. Cebulski revealed that plans for the X-Men extend to 2024 building towards what Jonathan Hickman planned before he left, including the third annual Hellfire Gala. During the Next Big Thing panel on NYCC 2022, Lowe mentioned that there will be another Hellfire Gala before the Fall of X event. It was written by Gerry Duggan, with art by Adam Kubert, Luciano Vecchio, Matteo Lolli, Russell Dauterman, Javier Pina, R.B. Silva, Joshua Cassara, Kris Anka, and Pepe Larraz.

A third X-Men election was announced with the results to be revealed in the third Hellfire Gala. The one-shot issue would launch the Fall of X event after a series of devastating revelations. Marvel also announced that Kamala Khan's resurrection story would begin with the X-Men Hellfire Gala 2023 #1 one-shot that was released on July 26, 2023.

A Marvel Comics caricature of Declan Shalvey who served as Ireland's ambassador appeared as one of the Hellfire Gala attendees.

=== Hellfire Vigil (2025) ===
In April 2025, Marvel announced that the Hellfire Gala would return in Hellfire Vigil (2025); the one-shot commemorates "the one-year, in-universe anniversary of Krakoa's fall". It also served as a transition point in the X-Men: From the Ashes publishing phase. The issue was released on July 2, 2025 and was written by Jed MacKay, Gail Simone, Eve Ewing, Alex Paknadel, Collin Kelly, Jackson Lanzing, Geoffrey Thorne, Jason Loo, Murewa Ayodele and Stephanie Phillips with art by Javier Garrón, Netho Diaz, Sara Pichelli, Federica Mancin, Luciano Vecchio, Declan Shalvey, Roi Mercado and Marcus To.

The Hellfire costume designs were created by artists Vecchio and Mancin. Vecchio explained that the costumes for Vigil are still "striking" but unlike previous Gala issues, these looks are "more solemn, less flashy yet still fun, that reflect each character's history in a Post-Krakoan way. Unlike previous years where I focused on individual designs one at a time, here I worked in bunches at once to create a cohesive look while keeping singularities". Dan Grote of ComicsXF commented that "black figures heavily into many of the designs" since it is for a "memorial". On the released designs, Grote highlighted that "the kids from Exceptional X-Men and Uncanny X-Men get to play dress-up" along with "characters we haven't seen since Krakoa twinkled out of this plane of existence, like Karma, Wolfsbane, Catseye, Angel Salvadore and Jumbo Carnation".

=== Hellfire Murder (2026) ===
In March 2026, Marvel announced that the Hellfire Gala would return in the one-shot The Hellfire Murder, which released on July 22, 2026. This iteration of the gala is hosted by Sebastian Shaw, who ends up being murdered during the gala. Wolverine later uncovers that Mystique and her accomplices were responsible. Marvel stated that this issue is "a capstone to the last year of X-Men storytelling" and "sets the stage for what's on the horizon" such as "the formation of an all-new Hellfire Club and the murder of a key mutant figure". The issue is written by Saladin Ahmed, Jed MacKay, Gail Simone, Eve L. Ewing and Erica Schultz with art by Tony Daniel, Luciano Vecchio, Federica Mancin and others. Vecchio led the design of the Hellfire costumes.

== Issues involved ==
Issue	Release date	Writer(s)	Artist(s)	Ref
Hellfire Gala
Marauders #21	June 2, 2021	Gerry Duggan; Chris Claremont	Matteo Lolli; John Bolton	
X-Force (vol. 6) #20	June 2, 2021	Benjamin Percy	Joshua Cassara	
Hellions #12	June 2, 2021	Zeb Wells	Stephen Segovia	
Excalibur (vol. 4) #21	June 9, 2021	Tini Howard	Marcus To	
X-Men (vol. 5) #21	June 9, 2021	Jonathan Hickman	Russell Dauterman; Nick Dragotta; Sara Pichelli; Lucas Werneck	
Planet-Sized X-Men #1	June 16, 2021	Gerry Duggan	Pepe Larraz	
New Mutants (vol. 4) #19	June 16, 2021	Vita Ayala	Alex Lins	
X-Corp #2	June 16, 2021	Tini Howard	Alberto Foche	
Wolverine (vol. 7) #13	June 23, 2021	Benjamin Percy	Scot Eaton	
S.W.O.R.D. (vol. 2) #6	June 23, 2021	Al Ewing	Valerio Schiti	
Way of X #3	June 23, 2021	Si Spurrier	Bob Quinn	
X-Factor (vol. 4) #10	June 30, 2021	Leah Williams	David Baldeón	
Subsequent one-shots
X-Men: Hellfire Gala (2022) #1	July 13, 2022	Gerry Duggan	Kris Anka; Russell Dauterman; Matteo Lolli; C.F. Villa	
X-Men: Hellfire Gala (2023) #1	July 26, 2023	Gerry Duggan; Jonathan Hickman	Kris Anka; Joshua Cassara; Russell Dauterman; Adam Kubert; Pepe Larraz; Matteo Lolli; Javier Pina; Valerio Schiti; R.B. Silva; Luciano Vecchio	
X-Men: Hellfire Vigil #1	July 2, 2025	Jed MacKay; Gail Simone; Eve Ewing; Alex Paknadel; Collin Kelly and Jackson Lanzing; Geoffrey Thorne; Jason Loo; Murewa Ayodele; Stephanie Phillips	Javier Garrón; Netho Diaz; Sara Pichelli; Federica Mancin; Luciano Vecchio; Declan Shalvey; Roi Mercado; Marcus To	

== Collected issues ==
Title	Material collected	Format	Pages	Released	ISBN
X-Men: Hellfire Gala	Marauders (2019 Marvel) #21, X-Men (2019-2021 Marvel) #21, Planet-Size X-Men (2021 Marvel) #1, S.W.O.R.D. (2021 Marvel) #6 and material from X-Men Classic (1986-1995 Marvel) Classic X-Men #7.	TPB	144	25 Jan 2022	978-1302931155
X-Men: Hellfire Gala Red Carpet Edition	X-Men (2019) #21; X-Force (2019) #20; New Mutants (2019) #19; X-Factor (2020) #10, Planet-Size X-Men (2021) #1, and more: Marauders (2019) #21; Excalibur (2019) #21; Hellions (2020) #12; S.W.O.R.D. (2020) #6; Way of X #3; X-Corp #2; Wolverine (2020) #13	Oversized HC	400	14 Dec 2021	Pepe Larraz cover: 978-0785109822
X-Men: Hellfire Gala Red Carpet Edition	X-Men (2019) #21; X-Force (2019) #20; New Mutants (2019) #19; X-Factor (2020) #10, Planet-Size X-Men (2021) #1, and more: Marauders (2019) #21; Excalibur (2019) #21; Hellions (2020) #12; S.W.O.R.D. (2020) #6; Way of X #3; X-Corp #2; Wolverine (2020) #13	Oversized HC	400	14 Dec 2021	Russell Dauterman DM cover: 978-1302931568

== Reception ==
=== Fashion ===
The Hellfire Gala, modeled after the real-life Met Gala, is a fancy soiree where guests are expected to show up in high fashion. Most of the formal wear are designed by Russell Dauterman, Alberto Foche, Lucas Werneck, David Baldeón, Matteo Lolli, Stephen Segovia, Bob Quinn, Alex Lins, Valerio Schiti, Marcus To and Joshua Cassara. EW writers Christian Holub and Nick Romano ranked Emma Frost, Storm and Mystique as the best dressed characters in the event.

=== Storyline ===
The creative team agreed that the story and the party were a success.

AIPT reviewer Lia Kolb stated that the storyline suffered from having the event's monumental announcement to be spoiled already by the previous issues in the event and the marketing itself.

=== Print sales ===
Issue	Release date	Comic Book Roundup Rating	Estimate Sales to North American retailers (first month)
Marauders #21	June 2, 2021	8.5 by 12 professional critics	64,517
X-Force (vol. 6) #20	June 2, 2021	8.1 by 10 professional critics	53,754
Hellions #12	June 2, 2021	8.5 by 12 professional critics	46,810
Excalibur (vol. 4) #21	June 9, 2021	7.5 by 7 professional critics	48,930
X-Men (vol. 5) #21	June 9, 2021	8.0 by 13 professional critics	89,924
Planet-Sized X-Men #1	June 16, 2021	8.2 by 19 professional critics	89,263
New Mutants (vol. 4) #19	June 16, 2021	8.3 by 8 professional critics	49,448
X-Corp #2	June 16, 2021	8.0 by 6 professional critics	46,495
Wolverine (vol. 7) #13	June 23, 2021	6.8 by 6 professional critics	78,545
S.W.O.R.D. (vol. 2) #6	June 23, 2021	9.2 by 12 professional critics	44,069
Way of X #3	June 23, 2021	8.0 by 11 professional critics	49,644
X-Factor (vol. 4) #10	June 30, 2021	7.0 by 8 professional critics	55,625

== In other media ==
- The Hellfire Gala is referenced in the animated series X-Men '97.
- The second season of the video game Marvel Rivals is titled "Hellfire Gala" and is inspired by the comics event. The Hellfire Gala also occurred in the tie-in comic series Marvel Rivals Infinity Comic.
- Several cards in the digital collectible card game Marvel Snap feature Hellfire Gala variants.
