= X-Men: From the Ashes =

Comics event

- 2024 promotional poster by Ryan Stegman and Marte Gracia, featuring the three main teams.
- Publisher: Marvel Comics
- Publication date: July 2024 – December 2025
- Genre: Superhero
- Main character: See below

Creative team
- Writer: Various
- Artist: Various
- Colorist: Various

X-Men: From the Ashes is a 2024 relaunch of the X-Men line of comic books published by Marvel Comics that follows the end of the "Krakoan Age" storyline.

Following the line-wide Age of Revelation event (October–December 2025), the line was succeeded by X-Men: Shadows of Tomorrow.

== Publication history ==
The initiative was announced by Marvel Comics' editor-in-chief C. B. Cebulski and VP, executive editor Tom Brevoort as part of the "Future of Marvel Comics' X-Men and Digital Comics" panel at South by Southwest (SXSW) 2024 on March 14, 2024. Brevoort replaced Jordan White as Group Editor of the X-Men, commenting that "because the characters were going to be of greater importance to Studios in the years to come, it made sense to have a more senior editorial presence overseeing the book". The relaunch intends to tell the story of mutantkind in a new status quo established following the end of the Krakoan Age's last phase Fall of X. The editorial direction they were given was to move away from "wrapping [the] Krakoa era". Brevoort highlighted that the relaunch name was derived from the opening text in Giant-Size X-Men #1 (1975) and that it was Gail Simone "who threw out the phrase 'From the Ashes' amongst a bunch of other suggestions".

As part of the initial announcement, details around the first three titles – X-Men (vol. 7) written by Jed MacKay with art by Ryan Stegman, Uncanny X-Men (vol. 6) written by Simone with art by David Marquez, and Exceptional X-Men written by Eve L. Ewing with art by Carmen Carnero – were revealed. X-Men is scheduled for release in July 2024 with Uncanny X-Men following in August 2024 and Exceptional X-Men in September 2024. Additional ongoing titles were later confirmed: NYX (vol. 2), Phoenix, Storm (vol. 5), Wolverine (vol. 8), X-Factor (vol. 5), and X-Force (vol. 7). Jake Murray of ComicsXF highlighted that, per Brevoort, the intention of this relaunch is "catering to each and every type of X-Men fan" so everyone has something with no "unifying concept" beyond that. Murray commented that "each title very much feels separate from the others – set in different locations, combating different threats, featuring different characters. So if there feels like a lack of cohesion or connectedness between the titles, that's by design". NYX writer Collin Kelly stated "while we absolutely will not say that [the Krakoan] era is required reading for this book or any of this new line, it is incredibly important for us to acknowledge what has come before and the impact that Krakoa had on the mutant population" with his co-writer Jackson Lanzing highlighting that NYX is "one of the few books that's designed in some ways to answer that era rather than push past it directly".

The final Fall of X issue, X-Men (vol. 6) #35 (legacy Uncanny X-Men #700), was published in June 2024; the end of the issue previews the From The Ashes relaunch with Xavier telepathically "witnessing mutants trying to re-integrate into human society and facing the same fear and hatred they always have". Marvel then dropped X-Men: From the Ashes Infinity Comic, written by Alex Paknadel with art by Diogenes Neves, on June 5; the series picks up from X-Men (vol. 6) #35 and leads into X-Men (vol. 7) #1. Starting with X-Men (vol. 7) #1 (July 2024), each From the Ashes issue included a QR code which led to an extra digital stinger page. Brevoort commented that these pages are initially a digital exclusive to avoid spoiler leaks, however, Marvel intends to include these pages in future collected editions. This practice was later discontinued, starting with issues published in September 2024, which Brevoort attributed to "pushback" from fans.

During this relaunch, an announcement system was established in which new characters are introduced before their debut. Kitty Pryde's bisexuality was confirmed in September 2024 with Exceptional X-Men #1. The first X-Men crossover event storyline, Raid On Graymalkin, began in December 2024 with X-Men (vol. 7) #8. The four-issue event occurred across X-Men (vol. 7) and Uncanny X-Men (vol. 6) – Simone commented that she hopes "this is a precursor to more short crossovers" and that while the audience can follow the event story by reading only one series, "you'll get a bigger, richer picture if you get both". This relaunch also introduced the Resurrection-Linked Degenerative Sickness (R-LDS), a condition supposedly linked to the mutant resurrection protocols introduced during the Krakoan Age.

Giant-Size X-Men Anniversary Event was announced on February 19, 2025, to celebrate the golden jubilee of Giant-Size X-Men. The event revisits The Dark Phoenix Saga, Age of Apocalypse, House of M, and other events from the X-Men's history. Lanzing commented that they knew in advance NYX (vol. 2) would end with issue #10 so they were able to include a finale for the characters, however, Kamala Khan's story would continue in Giant-Size X-Men #1 (May 2025). In April 2025, Marvel announced that the Hellfire Gala would return in Hellfire Vigil (2025), a one-shot that "commemorate[s] the one-year, in-universe anniversary of Krakoa's fall". The issue also serves as a transition point in the From the Ashes publishing phase.

In July 2025, Marvel Comics released a teaser for the "Age of Revelation", which released in October 2025. Marvel then announced that the "Age of Revelation" event would commemorate the 30th anniversary of Age of Apocalypse (1995) and begins with Age of Revelation Overture #1. The event is preceded by X-Men: Age of Revelation #0, a surprise one-shot issue that was released in July 2025, written by Jed MacKay and illustrated by Humberto Ramos. ComicsXF explained this event would have a similar format to previous events such as Age of X-Man (2019) and Sins of Sinister (2023) where Marvel shuts "down a bunch of ongoing series" in order to relaunch "them with new names and concepts". Set ten years in the future, "Age of Revelation" focuses on a new mutant utopia led by Apocalypse's heir Doug Ramsey; however the Revelation Territories were "built on a lie and threatens to overwhelm the earth and destroy humanity, leading a band of X-Men to foment rebellion". In total, "Age of Revelation" features the Overture and Finale one-shot issues, "16 interconnected three-issue miniseries and a special anthology". The flagship titles are Amazing X-Men (vol. 3), written by MacKay and illustrated by Mahmud Asrar, and Unbreakable X-Men, written by Simone and illustrated by Lucas Werneck.

== Titles ==
=== Prelude ===
Title	Writer(s)	Artist(s)	Colorist(s)	Release date	Ref
Free Comic Book Day 2024: Blood Hunt/X-Men #1 (Note: Issue also contained a Blood Hunt prelude by Jed MacKay, Sara Pichelli and Federico Blee.)	Gail Simone	David Marquez	Edgar Delgado	May 4, 2024	
X-Men: Heir of Apocalypse (#1–4)	Steve Foxe	Netho Diaz	Dotun Akande	June 12, 2024	

=== Ongoing series ===
Key
Symbol	Meaning
*	Title continued into X-Men: Shadows of Tomorrow.

Title	Issues	Writer(s)	Artist(s)	Colorist	Debut date	Conclusion date	Ref
X-Men (vol. 7)	#1–22	Jed MacKay	Ryan Stegman; Netho Diaz	Marte Gracia	July 10, 2024	September 24, 2025*	
Phoenix (vol. 2)	#1–15	Stephanie Phillips	Alessandro Miracolo; Marco Renna	David Curiel	July 17, 2024	September 17, 2025	
NYX (vol. 2)	#1–10	Collin Kelly; Jackson Lanzing	Francesco Mortarino; Enid Balám	Raúl Angulo	July 24, 2024	April 30, 2025	
X-Force (vol. 7)	#1–10	Geoffrey Thorne	Marcus To	Erick Arciniega	July 31, 2024	April 23, 2025	
Uncanny X-Men (vol. 6)	#1–21	Gail Simone	David Marquez; Javier Garrón	Matt Wilson	August 7, 2024	September 17, 2025*	
X-Factor (vol. 5)	#1–10	Mark Russell	Bob Quinn	Jesus Aburtov	August 14, 2024	May 14, 2025	
Exceptional X-Men	#1–13	Eve L. Ewing	Carmen Carnero	Nolan Woodard	September 4, 2024	September 10, 2025	
Wolverine (vol. 8)	#1–13	Saladin Ahmed	Martín Cóccolo	Bryan Valenza	September 11, 2024	September 3, 2025*	
Storm (vol. 5)	#1–12	Murewa Ayodele	Lucas Werneck	Alex Guimarães	October 2, 2024	September 24, 2025	
Psylocke (vol. 2)	#1–10	Alyssa Wong	Vincenzo Carratù; Moisés Hidalgo	Fernando Sifuentes	November 13, 2024	August 20, 2025	
Laura Kinney: Wolverine	#1–10	Erica Schultz	Giada Belviso	Rachelle Rosenberg	December 11, 2024	September 3, 2025	
Hellverine (vol. 2)	#1–10	Benjamin Percy	Raffaele Ienco	Bryan Valenza	December 18, 2024	September 10, 2025	
Deadpool/Wolverine	#1–10	Benjamin Percy	Joshua Cassara; Robert Gill	Guru-eFX	January 1, 2025	October 1, 2025	
Magik (vol. 2)	#1–10	Ashley Allen	Germán Peralta	Arthur Hesli	January 8, 2025	September 17, 2025	

=== Ongoing series tie-in ===
Title	Issue	Writer(s)	Artist(s)	Colorist	Debut date	Ref
Avengers (vol. 9)	#17	Jed MacKay	Valerio Schiti	Federico Blee	August 7, 2024	

=== Limited series ===
Title	Issues	Writer(s)	Artist	Colorist	Debut date	Conclusion date	Ref
Dazzler (vol. 3)	#1–4	Jason Loo	Rafael Loureiro	Javier Tartaglia	September 18, 2024	December 11, 2024	
Sentinels	#1–5	Alex Paknadel	Justin Mason	Federico Blee	October 9, 2024	February 26, 2025	
Mystique (vol. 2)	#1–5	Declan Shalvey		Matt Hollingsworth	October 16, 2024	February 19, 2025	
Cable: Love and Chrome	#1–5	David Pepose	Mike Henderson	Arif Prianto	January 1, 2025	May 28, 2025	
Weapon X-Men (vol. 2)	#1–5	Joe Casey	ChrisCross	Yen Nitro	February 19, 2025	June 18, 2025	
Giant-Size X-Men (vol. 3) (Note: Issue #1 also contained a Revelations story by Al Ewing, Sara Pichelli and Federico Blee. Issue #2 also contained a Revelations story by Jed MacKay and Cafu.)	#1–2	Collin Kelly; Jackson Lanzing	Adam Kubert	Laura Martin	May 28, 2025	August 13, 2025	
Age of Revelation
Amazing X-Men (vol. 3)	#1–3	Jed MacKay	Mahmud Asrar	Matt Wilson	October 8, 2025	December 3, 2025	
Binary	#1–3	Stephanie Phillips	Giada Belviso	Rachelle Rosenberg	October 8, 2025	December 3, 2025	
Laura Kinney: Sabretooth	#1–3	Erica Schultz	Valentina Pinti	Rachelle Rosenberg	October 8, 2025	December 3, 2025	
Longshots	#1–3	Gerry Duggan; Jonathan Hickman	Alan Robinson	Yen Nitro	October 8, 2025	December 10, 2025	
Unbreakable X-Men	#1–3	Gail Simone	Lucas Werneck	TBA	October 15, 2025	December 10, 2025	
Rogue Storm	#1–3	Murewa Ayodele	Roland Boschi	Neeraj Menon	October 15, 2025	December 17, 2025	
Iron & Frost	#1–3	Cavan Scott	Ruairí Coleman	Yen Nitro	October 15, 2025	December 10, 2025	
Sinister's Six	#1–3	David Marquez	Rafael Loureiro	Alex Sinclair	October 15, 2025	December 10, 2025	
The Last Wolverine	#1–3	Saladin Ahmed	Edgar Salazar	TBA	October 22, 2025	December 17, 2025	
Omega Kids	#1–3	Tony Fleecs	Andrés Genolet	TBA	October 22, 2025	December 17, 2025	
Radioactive Spider-Man	#1–3	Joe Kelly	Kev Walker	TBA	October 22, 2025	December 17, 2025	
X-Men: Book of Revelation	#1–3	Jed MacKay	Netho Diaz	TBA	October 22, 2025	December 17, 2025	
Cloak or Dagger	#1–3	Justina Ireland	Lorenzo Tammetta	TBA	October 29, 2025	December 24, 2025	
Expatriate X-Men	#1–3	Eve L. Ewing	Francesco Mortarino	TBA	October 29, 2025	December 24, 2025	
Undeadpool	#1–3	Tim Seeley	Carlos Magno	TBA	October 29, 2025	December 24, 2025	
X-Vengers	#1–3	Jason Loo	Sergio Dávila	TBA	October 29, 2025	December 24, 2025	

=== One-shot ===
Title	Writer	Artist	Colorist	Release date	Ref
Timeslide #1	Steve Foxe	Ivan Fiorelli	Frank D'Armata	December 25, 2024	
X-Men: Xavier's Secret #1 (Note: Reprints X-Men: From the Ashes Infinity Comic #1–6.)	Alex Paknadel	Diogenes Neves	Arthur Hesli	January 22, 2025	
X-Manhunt Omega #1	Gail Simone; Murewa Ayodele	Gleb Melnikov	Brian Reber	March 26, 2025	
Free Comic Book Day 2025: Fantastic Four/Giant-Size X-Men #1 (Note: Issue also contains stories by Ryan North, Humberto Ramos, and Edgar Delgado, and Chip Zdarsky.)	Collin Kelly; Jackson Lanzing	Iban Coello	Brian Reber	May 3, 2025	
Giant-Size Dark Phoenix Saga #1 (Note: Issue also contains a Revelations story by Steve Foxe, and Lucas Werneck.)	Collin Kelly; Jackson Lanzing	Rod Reis		June 11, 2025	
X-Men: Demons and Death #1 (Note: Reprints X-Men: From the Ashes Infinity Comic #7–12.)	Alex Paknadel	Phillip Sevy	Arthur Hesli	June 25, 2025	
Giant-Size Age of Apocalypse #1 (Note: Issue also contains a Revelations story by Jeph Loeb, and Simone Di Meo.)	Collin Kelly; Jackson Lanzing	C.F. Villa; Rafael Loureiro	Edgar Delgado	June 25, 2025	
Giant-Size House of M #1 (Note: Issue also contains a Revelations story by Saladin Ahmed, Martín Cóccolo and Matt Wilson.)	Collin Kelly; Jackson Lanzing	Francesco Manna	Edgar Delgado	July 16, 2025	
X-Men: Hellfire Vigil #1	Jed MacKay; Gail Simone; Eve Ewing; Alex Paknadel; Collin Kelly; Jackson Lanzing; Geoffrey Thorne; Jason Loo; Murewa Ayodele; Stephanie Phillips	Javier Garrón; Netho Diaz; Sara Pichelli; Federica Mancin; Luciano Vecchio; Declan Shalvey; Roi Mercado; Marcus To	TBA	July 2, 2025	
X-Men: Tooth and Claw #1 (Note: Reprints X-Men: From the Ashes Infinity Comic #13–18.)	Alex Paknadel	Diógenes Neves; Phillip Sevy	Arthur Hesli; Michael Bartolo	August 27, 2025	
World of Revelation #1	Ryan North; Al Ewing; Steve Foxe	Adam Szalowski; Jesus Merino	TBA	October 8, 2025	

=== Infinity Comics ===
Infinity Comics are weekly stories told in an unpaginated vertical format exclusively released on Marvel Unlimited.

Title		Issues	Writer	Artist	Colorist	Debut date	Ref
X-Men: From the Ashes	Eversong	#1–3	Alex Paknadel	Diogenes Neves	Arthur Hesli	June 5, 2024	
X-Men: From the Ashes	What Charlie Did...	#4–6	Alex Paknadel	Diogenes Neves	Arthur Hesli	July 1, 2024	
X-Men: From the Ashes	Don't Sound Like No Sonnet	#7–9	Alex Paknadel	Phillip Sevy	Arthur Hesli	July 22, 2024	
X-Men: From the Ashes	Samosud	#10–12	Alex Paknadel	Phillip Sevy	Arthur Hesli	August 12, 2024	
X-Men: From the Ashes	In Dreams	#13–14	Alex Paknadel	Diogenes Neves	Arthur Hesli	September 2, 2024	
X-Men: From the Ashes	Pygmalion	#15–18	Alex Paknadel	Phillip Sevy	Michael Bartolo	September 16, 2024	
X-Men: From the Ashes	Becalmed	#19–21	Alex Paknadel	Diogenes Neves	Arthur Hesli	October 14, 2024	
X-Men: From the Ashes	Agents of T.H.A.N.K.S.	#22–25	Tim Seeley	Eric Koda	Arthur Hesli; K.J. Diaz	November 4, 2024	
Astonishing X-Men	Back to Roots	#1–6	Alex Paknadel	Phillip Sevy	Michael Bartolo	December 2, 2024	
Astonishing X-Men	The Unbeatable Foe	#7–12	Tim Seeley	Edoardo Audino	Edoardo Audino	January 20, 2025	
Astonishing X-Men	Controlled Demolition	#13–18	Alex Paknadel	Phillip Sevy	Michael Bartolo	March 10, 2025	
Astonishing X-Men	I Have Seen Tomorrow	#19–24	Tim Seeley	Edoardo Audino	K.J. Díaz	April 28, 2025	
Astonishing X-Men	The Cuckoo Song	#25–	Alex Paknadel	Phillip Sevy	Michael Bartolo	June 16, 2025	

=== Events and crossovers ===
Part	Issue	Release date	Ref
Raid on Graymalkin
1	X-Men (vol. 7) #8	December 4, 2024	
2	Uncanny X-Men (vol. 6) #7	December 11, 2024	
3	X-Men (vol. 7) #9	December 18, 2024	
4	Uncanny X-Men (vol. 6) #8	January 8, 2025	
X-Manhunt
1	Uncanny X-Men (vol. 6) #11	March 5, 2025	
2	NYX (vol. 2) #9	March 5, 2025	
3	Storm (vol. 5) #6	March 5, 2025	
4	X-Men (vol. 7) #13	March 12, 2025	
5	X-Factor (vol. 5) #8	March 12, 2025	
6	X-Force (vol. 7) #9	March 19, 2025	
—N/a	Exceptional X-Men #7 (Note: Tie-in issue for the X-Manhunt event.)	March 19, 2025	
7	X-Manhunt Omega #1	March 26, 2025	
Giant-Size X-Men
1	Giant-Size X-Men (vol. 3) #1	May 28, 2025	
2	Giant-Size Dark Phoenix Saga #1	June 11, 2025	
3	Giant-Size Age of Apocalypse #1	June 25, 2025	
4	Giant-Size House of M #1	July 16, 2025	
5	Giant-Size X-Men (vol. 3) #2	August 13, 2025	
Age of Revelation
—N/a	Age of Revelation #0	July 16, 2025	
1	Age of Revelation: Overture #1	October 1, 2025	

== Main characters by series ==
These characters are credited as main cast in the respective comics.

Series	Characters	Ref
Ongoing series
X-Men (vol. 7)	Beast; Cyclops; Juggernaut; Kid Omega; Magik; Magneto; Psylocke; Temper; Xorn; Constellation; Galatea; Juice; Psychovore; Schwarzschild; Timebomb; Bei the Blood Moon; Cypher; Warlock	
Phoenix	Jean Grey; Adani; Perrikus; Corsair; Thanos; Captain Marvel; Nova; Rocket Raccoon; Sif	
NYX (vol.2)	Anole; Ms. Marvel; Prodigy; Sophie Cuckoo; Wolverine (Laura Kinney); Hellion; Kiden Nixon; Synch; Local	
X-Force (vol. 7)	Askani; Captain Britain; Forge; Sage; Tank; Surge	
Uncanny X-Men (vol. 6)	Gambit; Nightcrawler; Rogue; Wolverine (Logan); Calico; Deathdream; Jitter; Ransom; Jubilee	
X-Factor (vol. 5)	Angel; Cameo; Feral; Firefist; Havok; Xyber; Cecilia Reyes; Frenzy; Granny Smite; Pyro; ForgetMeNot	
Exceptional X-Men	Kitty Pryde; Bronze; White Queen; Axo; Melee; Iceman	
Storm (vol. 5)	Storm; Doctor Voodoo	
Wolverine (vol. 8)	Wolverine (Logan); Wendigo; Constrictor; Cyber; Lady Deathstrike; Nightcrawler; Wolverine (Laura Kinney); Romulus	
Psylocke (vol. 2)	Psylocke; Devon Di Angelo; John Greycrow	
Laura Kinney: Wolverine	Wolverine (Laura Kinney)	
Deadpool/Wolverine	Deadpool; Wolverine (Logan)	
Magik (vol. 2)	Magik; Cal Isaacs; Mirage	
Ongoing series tie-in
Avengers (vol. 9)	Black Panther; Captain America; Captain Marvel; Iron Man; Scarlet Witch; Storm; Thor; Vision	
Limited series
Dazzler (vol. 3)	Dazzler; Domino; Multiple Man; Shark-Girl; Strong Guy; Wind Dancer; Lila Cheney	
Sentinels	Drumfire; Lawrence Trask; Lockstep; Sawtooth; Shellback; Voivod; Corina Ellis	
Mystique (vol. 2)	Mystique; Nick Fury; Destiny; Maria Hill	
Cable: Love and Chrome	Cable; Avery Ryder	
Weapon X-Men (vol. 2)	Cable; Chamber; Deadpool; Thunderbird; Wolverine (Logan)	
One-shot
Timeslide	Bishop; Cable	
X-Men: Xavier's Secret	Cyclops; Jean Grey; Ben Urich; Professor X; Sally Floyd	
X-Manhunt: Omega	Angel; Beast; Calico; Cyclops; Deathdream; Gambit; Jitter; John Wraith; Kid Omega; Lilandra Neramani; Magik; Nightcrawler; Professor X; Psylocke; Pyro; Ransom; Rogue; Sage; Storm; Temper; White Queen; Wolverine (Logan)	
X-Men: Demons and Death	Havok; Goblin Queen; Polaris; Omega Red	
Events
Age of Revelation	Beast; Cyclops; Glob Herman; Jen Starkey; Magneto; Psylocke; Xorn	

== Critical reception ==
On the launch of From the Ashes, Austin Gorton of ComicsXF traced the cyclical nature of X-Men line relaunches, commenting that it is "worth remembering that this is hardly the first time the X-Men have been relaunched in the interest of presenting a more sales-friendly version of the line. That even amid the corporate-driven appeal to the bottom line, good stories can still emerge, new readers can discover the characters and become fans, with the full tapestry of what came before – both good and bad – now more available to them than ever before". Gorton highlighted that From the Ashes is similar to the "'91 relaunch, Astonishing X-Men and the Color Era" as it was "clearly designed to present a more comfortable and broadly appealing iteration of the characters, one that will, with eventual hindsight, likely mimic what is coming in the form of the MCU's version of the X-Men. That it comes at the expense of such a distinctive and creative (if somewhat floundering) iteration of the line, an iteration that deeply resonated with many readers, is a shame".

Michael Guerrero, reviewing X-Men #1 (Vol. 7) for AIPT, viewed the opening issue as a "strong relaunch" which introduces a new X-Men era to readers and even though "it may be a bit familiar, I believe it does a great job of leaping over one of the hardest hurdles for the title: following up on the aftermath of the fall of Krakoa". In contrast, Jamie Lovett of ComicBook.com thought the first issue lacked "a strong hook" as "characters under familiar circumstances" were not enough to make a statement. Similarly, Adam Barnhardt of ComicBook.com opined that the first issue of X-Force (vol. 7) "neither sinks nor swims, it simply is – and that much is the cardinal sin of the medium. The issue is unable to stand-out from casual superhero storytelling, and it's a rather tame debut to follow one of the best X-Men eras Marvel has ever published". In August 2024, Jake Murray of ComicsXF stated that "From the Ashes has left me a little cold" or perhaps "burned out" following the release of four first issues over a four week period, however, he enjoyed Uncanny X-Men #1 "more than [he had] expected". Jonathan Jones, reviewing Uncanny X-Men (vol. 6) #1 for AIPT, commented that "for the X-Men fans burned by the loss of Krakoa, you're not alone" and highlighted how Rogue is also hurt by that loss – "it may seem silly from the outside, but it is a comfort to see our heroes grapple with the same sense of loss rather than be played for laughs; this theme is prominent throughout From the Ashes books so far, but none so clearly as here in Uncanny X-Men #1".
