= Storm (Marvel Comics) =

Marvel Comics superhero

- Character template for Storm ongoing series (2024); Art by Lucas Werneck.

Publication information
- Publisher: Marvel Comics
- First appearance: Giant-Size X-Men #1 (May 1975)
- Created by: Len Wein; Dave Cockrum

In-story information
- Alter ego: Ororo Munroe
- Species: Human mutant
- Place of origin: Harlem, New York City, United States
- Team affiliations: X-Men; Avengers; Fantastic Four; Swordbearers of Krakoa; Great Ring of Arakko; Brotherhood of Arakko
- Notable aliases: Weather Witch; White King; Windrider
- Abilities: Atmokinesis; Flight; Ecological empathy; Temperature and pressure resistance

Storm is a superhero appearing in American comic books published by Marvel Comics. Created by writer Len Wein and artist Dave Cockrum, the character first appeared in Giant-Size X-Men #1 (May 1975). Descended from a long line of African witch-priestesses, Storm is a member of a fictional subspecies of humans born with superhuman abilities known as mutants. She is able to control the weather and atmosphere and is considered to be one of the most powerful mutants on the planet. Storm is a member of the X-Men, a group of mutant heroes fighting for peace and equal rights between mutants and humans. She was one of the most prominently featured X-Men characters in the 1980s, at which time it was the best-selling comic book in America. During this decade, she also acted as the acknowledged leader of the team.

Born Ororo Munroe to a tribal princess of Kenya, and a Black-American photojournalist father, Storm was raised in Harlem, New York City, and Cairo, Egypt. She was made an orphan after her parents were killed when a plane crashed into their house. This incident traumatized Ororo, leaving her with claustrophobia that she would struggle with for decades. Under the tutelage of a master thief, an adolescent Ororo became a skilled pickpocket. By coincidence, she met the powerful mutant Professor X. Professor X later convinced Ororo to join the X-Men and use her abilities for a greater cause and purpose. Possessing natural leadership skills and formidable powers of her own, Storm has been a member of teams such as the Avengers and the Fantastic Four, as well as the X-Men. Storm is also a part of a highly promoted romantic relationship with Black Panther. While she was married to him, she was also made queen consort of the African nation of Wakanda. While she lost the title when the marriage was annulled, she has maintained her relationship with Black Panther in many subsequent stories.

Storm is the first Black leader of a Marvel superhero team, as well as the first female leader of a Marvel superhero team. She is the second Black female superhero for Marvel, after Misty Knight, who was created two months earlier. Storm is one of Marvel's most notable, powerful, and popular female heroes.

One of the most prominent characters in the X-Men franchise, Storm has appeared in various X-Men-related media, including animation, video games, and films. Alison Sealy-Smith voiced Storm in X-Men: The Animated Series (1992–1997) and reprises the role in its revival X-Men '97 (2024–present) and What If…? (2024). Halle Berry and Alexandra Shipp both portrayed Storm in 20th Century Fox's live-action X-Men film series (2000–2019), and Maya Boyd will portray her in the Marvel Cinematic Universe, starting with the untitled X-Men film (2028).

== Publication history ==
=== Creation ===
Storm was created to appear as part of an ensemble: The "all-new, all-different X-Men", a re-invention of the traditional X-Men team of the 1960s that had fallen out of popularity. This new team replaced the previous members with the exception of Cyclops, who remained. This team differed greatly from the original. Unlike in the early issues of the original series, the new team was not made up of teenagers and they also had a more diverse background. Marvel's corporate owners, Cadence Industries, had suggested the new team should be international, feeling it needed characters with "foreign appeal". So each character was from a different country with varying cultural and philosophical beliefs, and all were already well-versed in using their mutant powers.

First introduced in Giant-Size X-Men (1975), the new X-Men featured the newly created Colossus (from the Soviet Union/Russia), Nightcrawler (from West Germany/Germany), and Thunderbird (a Native American of Apache descent), along with Storm, from Kenya. The team also included four previously introduced characters: Cyclops (United States), Banshee (from Ireland), Sunfire (from Japan), and Wolverine (from Canada).

Storm was an amalgam of two characters Cockrum created: The Black Cat (not to be confused with the Spider-Man supporting character) and Typhoon. The Black Cat had Storm's costume, minus the cape, and was submitted for the new X-Men's original lineup. However, during a hiatus in the new X-Men project, other female cat characters like Tigra were introduced, making the Black Cat redundant.

Since the creative team did not want the X-Men to have an all-male lineup, editor Roy Thomas suggested that Cockrum make his character Typhoon, designed as a male, into the woman of the group. Cockrum liked the idea and outfitted Typhoon with The Black Cat's costume, a cape, and a new haircut with white hair. His collaborators feared that Storm's white hair would make her look like a grandmother, but Cockrum, confident that he could consistently draw the character so that she would appear young, insisted on this aspect of her appearance.

=== 1975–1979: Origin and early stories ===
Giant-Size X-Men #1 (1975) is Storm's first appearance. Art by Gil Kane and Dave Cockrum.

Storm first appeared in 1975 in the comic book Giant-Size X-Men #1, written by Len Wein and pencilled by Dave Cockrum. In this comic, Wein portrays a battle against the living island Krakoa that results in the replacement of first-generation X-Men of the 1960s by new X-Men.

Chris Claremont followed up Wein as the writer of The X-Men in 1975. The title of the series was changed to The Uncanny X-Men three years later. Storm was initially written having trouble adjusting to Western culture, e.g. calling the obligation to wear clothing in public "absurd." Claremont remained the main writer of X-Men for the next 16 years, and consequently wrote most of the publications containing Storm. Following "The Dark Phoenix Saga", Storm becomes the most prominent character in the X-Men during Claremont's tenure. She is often a viewpoint character whose thought processes guide the narrative. She is the character who is most frequently represented in the Claremont era, appearing in 4,155 panels, and the most frequently pictured on issue covers, appearing on 97 of the 182 total issues in Claremont's run.

=== 1980s: Punk look and loss of powers ===
By the early 1980s, X-Men was Marvel's top-selling comic title. Its sales were such that distributors and retailers began using an "X-Men index", rating each comic book publication by how many orders it garnered compared to that month's issue of X-Men. In this period, Claremont portrayed Storm as a serene, independent character. In The Uncanny X-Men #139 (November 1980), Claremont established her as the leader of the X-Men after Cyclops takes a leave of absence. Claremont also established a maternal relationship between Storm and her 13-year-old teammate, Kitty Pryde. A short story by Claremont set during Storm's childhood in Kenya that ran in Marvel Team-Up #100 (December 1980), establishes that when she was 12 years old, Storm saved a young Black Panther from racist thugs. This story would later become the basis for later writers to establish a deeper relationship between both characters.

In the early 1980s, adventures of Storm written by Claremont included a space opera arc, in which the X-Men fight parasitic beings called the Brood. Storm is infected with a Brood egg and contemplates suicide, but is saved at the last minute by the benign whale-like Acanti aliens. Subsequently, Storm's fellow X-Man Angel is abducted by a rogue mutant group called the Morlocks. The Morlocks are "subterranean mutant refugees ... living in the tunnels of the New York City sewer system," and constitute an underclass of outcasts. The X-Men are outnumbered, and Storm is rendered sick by the Morlock called Plague. To save Kitty's life, Storm challenges the Morlocks' leader Callisto, in a duel to the death for the leadership of the Morlocks. Callisto is presented as a complex character who rebels against her position of low social status. Despite Storm's illness, she defeats Callisto by stabbing her with a knife. Callisto is saved through the efforts of the Morlock Healer, and Storm offers the Morlocks refuge at the Xavier Mansion, though they decline. Storm is then made leader of the Morlocks. This fight with Callisto has strong effects on Storm's character, who becomes more defiantly non-conformist. Following this incident, Storm has an encounter with Yukio, a ninja companion of Wolverine's. Storm has a close and intimate bond with her. While the characters' relationship was conceived of as romantic, it was relegated to subtext after Marvel Comics' editor-in-chief Jim Shooter mandated that no same-gender couples could be depicted at Marvel. These experiences lead Storm to drastically change her appearance.

Storm's punk look by Paul Smith, who called it "a bad joke that got way out of hand."

In The Uncanny X-Men #173 (October 1983), Claremont and artist Paul Smith created a new look for Storm, replacing her old costume with a punk fashion aesthetic: A black leather top and pants with spikes and a mohawk. The change in appearance was inspired by the decision of colleague Walt Simonson to shave off his beard and mustache while on vacation with his wife, X-Men editor Louise Simonson. Upon their return, Simonson's daughter, Julie, upset at her father's new appearance, ran from the room. When the editors decided to change Storm's appearance, Smith submitted a number of designs to them, explaining in a 2008 interview:

I did a number of portraits, all quite lovely and feminine. As a joke, I included a shot of her as Mr. T. You know, the kind of shot where they HAVE to go the other way. Weezie [X-Men editor Louise Simonson]'s response? 'They're going to hang us whichever way we go. Let's commit the murder.' I argued it was a joke and a monstrously bad idea but, given my departure following 175 was set prior to beginning my run, my vote didn't count. So I did what I could with what I had left... So we went with the Mohawk ...But once you get into the whole leather and stud thing it was a bad joke that got way out of hand.

Julie Simonson's reaction to her father's new appearance would be mirrored in X-Man Kitty Pryde's heartbroken rejection of Storm's new look. These changes alienate her from Kitty for a time. Comics scholar andre m. carrington views this incident as a challenge to the stereotype of Black women as universal caregivers, demonstrating unconscious expectations of race and gender.

A year later, Claremont wrote an arc in which fellow mutant Forge develops a mutant power neutralizing gun. The intended target is another X-Man, Rogue, but Storm is hit instead, taking away her powers. Forge takes her back to his home in Dallas, Texas to recover. They fall in love, but when she learns that Forge built the weapon that took her powers, she is heartbroken and leaves him.

By 1986, the question arises of whether the X-Men should be led by Storm or by Cyclops, who was now married to Madelyne Pryor and an expectant husband. The two settle the matter in a duel in the Danger Room that saw Storm victorious. J. Andrew Deman describes other instances in which Storm establishes her power and authority by commanding or overruling "highly masculinized white characters," such as Wolverine.

Marc Silvestri became the primary artist of Uncanny X-Men in the late 1980s. Regarding Storm, he said that "She has a certain attitude that's tough to capture without dropping into clichés and certain poses. ... You have to have an unusual energy level the day you have to draw Storm."

During the 1988 "Fall of the Mutants" storyline, Storm is trapped in another dimension with Forge, who restores her elemental powers. Following her rejoining the X-Men, they fight a demonic enemy called the Adversary. While they defeat the Adversary, the battle creates the public appearance that the X-Men have all died. In fact, they have survived with the help of a celestial being known as Roma. Roma casts a spell on them to be invisible to electronic equipment. The X-Men set up new headquarters in a small frontier village in the Australian Outback, after expelling a group of mutant-hunting cyborgs called Reavers who had been living there. Storm is captured by Nanny and Orphan-Maker. Although believed slain in that encounter, she resurfaces alive but bodily regressed to childhood by Nanny, with accompanying amnesia. She is hunted by the evil telepath Shadow King and framed for murder, and finally returns to thieving. While she slowly starts to regain her memories, she meets with a new character, the Cajun mutant Gambit, and they return to the X-Men together.

In the following arc, "The X-Tinction Agenda", she is kidnapped by the mutant-exploiting nation of Genosha and is temporarily transformed into a brainwashed slave. In the end, however, she is restored physically and mentally to her adult prime.

=== 1990s: Leadership of Gold team ===
Storm, during the 1990s. Art by Jim Lee.

In October 1991, the X-Men franchise was re-launched, centering on the new eponymous X-Men comic. The team was split in two; X-Men depicts the Blue team led by her colleague Cyclops and the continuing legacy series Uncanny X-Men portrays the Gold team. Led by Storm, the Gold team also comprises Colossus, Warren Worthington III, Iceman, and Jean Grey. In early issues of this run, Storm and the Gold Team confront the Hellfire Club and meet Bishop, a traveler from a possible future. The writing for this period of Uncanny X-Men was originally a collaboration between Whilce Portacio and John Byrne.

In later issues of Uncanny X-Men, now written by Scott Lobdell, Storm's relationship with Forge continues and culminates in Forge's proposal of marriage in 1992. Forge misinterprets Storm's slight hesitation, and he then rescinds his offer before it can be accepted. Lobdell waited until November 1993 before he wrote a reconciliation between the deeply pained Storm and Forge. John Romita Jr. provided most of the drawing for the series in 1993. There were multiple crossovers among the various X-Men comic series in this period that featured Storm as one character among others, such as X-Cutioner's Song, Fatal Attractions, and Phalanx Covenant. In 1994, Joe Madureira took over as the main penciler of Uncanny X-Men.

In 1995, all of the X-Men titles were temporarily replaced by an alternate reality storyline called Age of Apocalypse. Storm was a relatively minor character in this new reality. When the original series were restored, Lobdell continued an arc again pitting the X-Men against the Morlocks. As Claremont did with Callisto in 1983, Lobdell has Storm ending the battle by wounding her opponent in the heart. Here, Storm rips out one heart of the two-hearted Morlock girl Marrow, which has a bomb affixed to it. In February 1996, Storm appeared in her first miniseries, the eponymous Storm. Warren Ellis wrote this series, in which Storm is sucked into an alternate dimension and pitted against villain Mikhail Rasputin.

=== 2000s: X-Treme X-Men and marriage to Black Panther ===
Sales for X-Men titles declined in the late 1990s, and at the turn of the century there were various efforts to revive them.

One of these was the Ultimate Marvel imprint, a new collection of titles featuring reimagined versions of Marvel's characters. An alternate Storm appeared in February 2001 with Ultimate X-Men, written by Mark Millar. In this version, Storm is a teenager from Morocco.

Marvel also renewed the relationship between Storm and Black Panther. Written by Christopher Priest, Black Panther #25-27 (December 2000-February 2001) reintroduces Storm as a major character in Black Panther's world. Storm immediately says, "I have been away from Africa far too long." Storm is called to Wakanda to protect a child from aliens. The dispute eventually involves Doctor Doom and Namor. In their renewed interactions, Storm compares Black Panther's sense of commitment and certainty to that of Magneto. The issue establishes that Storm continues to believe that someday she and T'Challa may have a permanent marriage, but this must be deferred because of T'Challa's exclusive commitment to his nation. Priest later said that he believed the two characters had a profound love affair, but that in his view they could never have a permanent relationship, precisely because "Storm is the only human being on the planet Panther cannot B.S. She sees right through him, knows him far too intimately."

Chris Claremont returned to the character in his title X-Treme X-Men, beginning in July 2001. Storm was written as the leader of this team, and the central character of the book, until its end in issue #46 (June 2004). Salvador Larocca was the primary artist. Alongside Storm, other members included Rogue, Gambit, and Bishop. During this time, Storm enjoys a brief flirtation with younger fellow X-Man Slipstream and is kidnapped by the intergalactic warlord Khan. In the series, Storm also becomes the leader of the X-Treme Sanctions Executive, a special police task force of mutants policing mutants given worldwide authority.

During the 2005 House of M storyline, an alternate reality is created by Scarlet Witch in which mutants are dominant and humans are oppressed. In this reality, Africa is a united independent power ruled by Storm alongside Black Panther. Storm is critical of Magneto's mutant-supremacist ideas and practices. This is the first time that Storm and Black Panther are depicted as a royal couple, although their relationship in this reality is strained and they are not married. In the subsequent "Decimation" storyline, the previous timeline is restored, but 90% of mutants lose their powers. Storm is among the 198 mutants who retain their powers. Also that year, the miniseries Ororo: Before the Storm by writer Mark Sumerak retold her backstory in greater detail, concentrating on her relationship with surrogate father figure Achmed el-Gibar during her childhood. In late 2005, there was a crossover storyline between X-Men vol. 2 and Black Panther in which Storm and Black Panther rekindled their relationship in the mainstream shared universe.

The following year, Marvel Comics announced that Storm would marry fellow African super hero Black Panther. Collaborating writer Eric Jerome Dickey explained that it was a move to explicitly target the female and African American audience. Storm's history with Black Panther, including the initial meeting of the characters, was retconned by Marvel during the lead up to their marriage. Initially, in Marvel Team-Up #100 (1980), Storm is seen at age twelve rescuing Black Panther from a white racist called Andreas de Ruyter, but in Dickey's miniseries, T'Challa saves Ororo (who is still twelve) from de Ruyter and his brother. A Black Panther #24 (2006) flashback is ambiguous when it comes to the physical aspect of their first meeting, while the miniseries depicts Ororo giving her virginity to T'Challa a few days after they meet. Collaborating writer Axel Alonso, editor of Black Panther, has stated: "Eric's story, for all intents and purposes (...) is Ororo's origin story."

The relationship led to the marriage of the two most prominent black African Marvel Comics heroes in Black Panther #18 by writer Reginald Hudlin, July 2006, as a tie-in to the "Civil War" storyline. Marvel Comics editor-in-chief Joe Quesada was highly supportive of this marriage, stating it was the Marvel Comics equivalent of the marriage of "Lady Diana and Prince Charles", and he expected both characters to emerge strengthened. Shawn Dudley, the Emmy-Award Winning Costume Designer for TV's Guiding Light designed Storm's wedding dress, which was revealed in the April 17 issue of TV Guide, though the design was greatly altered for the comic event. The series establishes that Black Panther and Storm are both well-known and respected political leaders and celebrities worldwide; real-life figures such as George W. Bush, Fidel Castro, Nelson Mandela, and Oprah Winfrey are depicted as attending the wedding, as well as many Marvel superheroes. Some critics and fans felt that the marriage was "forced" or "rushed" rather than developing organically. Hudlin, the writer, responded that the event was set up by earlier storylines and that some of the criticisms may have been motivated by the desire to see Storm in a relationship with a character of long-standing popularity, such as Wolverine.

Subsequent to the marriage, Storm has many adventures with Black Panther, and she temporarily leaves the X-Men. She is a featured character throughout the remainder of Reginald Hudlin's run, from 2006 to 2009. In 2007, when Mister Fantastic and the Invisible Woman take time off from the Fantastic Four to work on their marriage in the aftermath of the "Civil War" storyline, Storm and Black Panther become temporary members of the Fantastic Four. Written by a Black author, Storm's stories with Black Panther delve more deeply into African-American culture than her previous portrayals. For example, in one story Storm and Black Panther visit an alien planet and meet alternate versions of Martin Luther King and Malcolm X, and the cover of one issue depicts Storm as resembling Angela Davis and accompanied by members of the Black Panther Party.

In 2008, Storm re-joins the X-Men in Astonishing X-Men #25, written by Warren Ellis. She explains that Wakanda supports an organization called Mutantes Sans Frontières (inspired by Médecins Sans Frontières) that now funds the X-Men, and that she should return to the team to research its current methods; she also says that she instigated the idea, because she "never knew that guilt-free shopping and constant lovemaking could get so boring." Subsequently, Storm is the featured protagonist of the four-issue X-Men: Worlds Apart miniseries, written by Christopher Yost. In this story, the reemergence of the Shadow King forces Storm to choose between her role as queen and her role as an X-Man. Confronting the Panther God Bast, Storm asserts that she is not limited to being one or the other, and that she is unafraid to do whatever is necessary to fulfill those responsibilities. Regaining Bast's favor, the two defeat the Shadow King and Storm decides that she will remain Queen of Wakanda as well as a member of the X-Men, refusing to choose between them. For a period, Storm is active in both of these roles. She is also a prominent supporting character in Doomwar, in which she helps Black Panther to recover from injuries sustained in battle.

=== 2010s: End of marriage and conflicts with Avengers and Inhumans ===
In 2010, Storm featured in X-Women, a one-shot story written by the veteran X-Men author Chris Claremont and illustrated by Milo Manara.

In 2011, Black Panther leaves Wakanda and takes a new role as the guardian of Hell's Kitchen, replacing Daredevil. Storm maintains a relationship with him and supports his decision, but they become increasingly estranged. She visits him once against his wishes, to rescue him and help him fight Kraven the Hunter.

After the 2011 revamp of the X-Men related comic books Storm appears as the leader of a defensive, reconnaissance-based team of X-Men in the ongoing X-Men title. In November that year, Storm joined the Avengers in The Avengers vol. 4 #19. However, in the following year she leaves the team to fight alongside the X-Men during the "Avengers vs. X-Men" storyline. This leads to a rift with Black Panther, when he sides with the Avengers. After a Phoenix-empowered Namor destroys Wakanda, Storm realizes the mutants have become irrationally destructive, and returns to help the Avengers. However, she is stunned when T'Challa tells her he has annulled their marriage.

In April 2013, Marvel debuted a new all-female series simply named X-Men. Written by Brian Wood with art by Olivier Coipel, X-Men features a roster of Storm, Jubilee, Rogue, Kitty Pryde, Rachel Grey, and Psylocke.

In late 2013, Marvel debuted Amazing X-Men by writer Jason Aaron, which featured Storm as a member of the team.

July 2014 saw the debut of a Storm solo series written by Greg Pak with art by Victor Inanez.

In the aftermath of "Secret Wars" storyline, Storm became the leader of the Extraordinary X-Men. The aim of the team was to provide a safe haven for mutants following the release of the Terrigen Mist, which is toxic to mutants. To protects the mutants, Storm relocated the team to Limbo. During Civil War II, Storm sided with Captain Marvel and was pitted against Magneto. Despite the tension between mutants and the Inhumans, Storm attempted to build an alliance with Medusa. When Magneto's X-Men attacked New Attilan, Storm's team clashed with the former villain. Storm reluctantly led the X-Men into a war with the Inhumans.

Following the war with the Inhumans, Storm steps down as leader of the X-Men and is replaced by Kitty Pryde. However, she continues to be a team member in X-Men: Gold. Storm's magical hammer, known as Stormcaster, briefly returned to her. Later, Ororo joins the X-Men: Red roster, led by the newly resurrected Jean Grey. During the Hunt for Wolverine, Storm helps the X-Men search for Logan in Madripoor. The mission results in a confrontation between the X-Men and the Femme Fatales, led by Viper.

In 2016, Storm re-appears a supporting character for Black Panther in the series written by well-known journalist and public intellectual Ta-Nehisi Coates, A Nation Under Our Feet. The following year, Storm appears as a member of a six-issue series examining Black superheroes also written by Coates, Black Panther and The Crew. In the series, Storm, Black Panther, Misty Knight, Luke Cage, and Eden Fesi discuss gentrification, racism, and police brutality. In the course of the Coates storyline, Storm re-kindles her relationship with Black Panther, although she remains independent of the Wakandan monarchy.

2019 begins a new era for the X-Men. Beginning in House of X and Powers of X, by Jonathan Hickman, the mutants found a new nation on the living island of Krakoa, where they are capable of regularly resurrecting mutants after their death. Storm gives a rousing speech of mutant unity on the island, affirming their shared community and identity. Storm features in the ensuing Marauders series written by Gerry Duggan, along with Kitty Pryde, Nightcrawler, Iceman, Emma Frost, Bishop, and Pyro. The new Marauders team attempt to locate mutants whose freedom of movement is restricted and to help them to emigrate to Krakoa.

=== 2020s ===
The Krakoa era continues in the first years of the 2020s. As one component of this story arc, Storm appears in Giant-Size Storm (2020).

Ann Nocenti wrote a new Storm mini-series in 2023. This takes place in the 1980s period, when Storm led the X-Men and shaved her hair into a mohawk. Nocenti commented, "The idea was to take two issues of Chris [Claremont]'s run and do a story that would happen between the issues, so I thought, 'What if you were suddenly the boss of all your friends? Would your friends like that?' I know my friends wouldn't obey my orders if I were suddenly the boss of them."

With the end of the Krakoa era after Fall of X, Storm becomes a member of the main Avengers team in Avengers #17 (August 2024), written by Jed MacKay and drawn by Valerio Schiti.

After the conclusion of the Krakoan era, Storm features prominently in a new solo by Murewa Ayodele as writer and Lucas Werneck as artist. It was published in October 2024. Positioned as Earth's Mightiest Mutant, the solo was part of the X-men: From the Ashes initiative. The solo follows Ororo operating out of a new flying sanctuary headquartered above Atlanta. The story develops her role on the global superhero stage, exploring her complex position balancing heroics as an Avenger alongside global mutant diplomacy as well as cosmic-level threats.

== Characterization ==
Richard Reynolds, in his book Superheroes (1992), describes Storm's character as withdrawn and cerebral, despite her elemental power, and sexually remote, despite her fetishistic costume. He argues that she has a quasi-maternal role with many of X-Men and often acts to resolve their various contradictions and disputes. Carol Cooper points out that Storm is often noted by other prominent characters for her magnetic attractiveness and sex appeal, but that this is always made secondary to her other qualities and capacities. Margaret Galvan sees Jean Grey as Phoenix as a character foil to Storm, because Grey loses control of her enormous powers and lapses into narcissism, while Storm avoids this pitfall. Galvan argues that this is an allegory for the transformation of liberal feminism from the 1970s to the 1980s. Ramzi Fawaz argues that Storm is defined by a capacity to "balance collective intimacies with her need for personal autonomy" and that this mirrors her superpowers' connection to the unpredictability of the natural world. Fawaz argues that Storm's claustrophobia also links her awareness of the natural environment with human politics and history.

=== Fictional character biography ===
In The Uncanny X-Men #102 (December 1976), Claremont established Storm's backstory. Storm's mother, N'Dare, was the princess of a tribe in Kenya and descended from a long line of African witch-priestesses with white hair, blue eyes, and a natural gift for sorcery. N'Dare falls in love with and marries American photojournalist, David Munroe. They move to Harlem in uptown New York City, where Ororo is born. They later moved to Egypt and lived there until they die during an Arab–Israeli conflict in a botched aircraft attack, leaving six-year-old Ororo as an orphan. Her violent claustrophobia is established as a result of being buried under tons of rubble after that attack. She becomes a skilled thief in Cairo under the benign Achmed el-Gibar and wanders into the Serengeti as a young woman. She is worshipped as a goddess when her powers appear before being recruited by Professor X for the X-Men.

Claremont fleshed out Storm's backstory in The Uncanny X-Men #117 (January 1979). He retroactively added that Professor X had met Storm as a child in Cairo, prior to his formation of the X-Men. While Ororo was a child thief, she stole from Charles Francis Xavier, later known as Professor X. He is able to use his mental powers to temporarily prevent her escape and recognizes the potential in her. However, when Xavier is attacked mentally by Amahl Farouk, the Shadow King, the two men are preoccupied with their battle, allowing the girl to escape. Both Xavier and the Shadow King recognize Storm as the young girl later. Ever since her inception in 1975, Storm's biography has largely stayed the same. Some reinterpretations were made in 2005 and 2006, when writers Mark Sumerak and Eric Jerome Dickey, respectively, rewrote part of her early history in the miniseries Ororo: Before the Storm and Storm vol. 2.

In established Marvel canon, Ororo Munroe is born in New York City as the child of Kenyan tribal princess N'Dare and American photographer David Munroe. According to Reginald Hudlin's Black Panther series, David Munroe's mother, Harriet, was an aide to Malcolm X who accompanied him on his journey throughout African nations, one of which was Wakanda. Munroe's childhood experience of Africa led him to pursue his degree at the fictional University of Kenya, where he ultimately met N'Dare.

When Ororo is six months old, she and her parents move to the Egyptian capital of Cairo. Five years later, during the Suez Crisis, a fighter jet crashes into her parents' house, killing them. Buried under tons of rubble, Ororo survives but is orphaned and left with intense claustrophobia. Her fear was once so intense that she was known to curl into a fetal position and approach a catatonic state. In late 2000s storylines, however, writers like Ed Brubaker and Christopher Yost have indicated that Storm had largely conquered her claustrophobia, and can freely move in tight spaces, even over long periods of time. After the death of her parents, Ororo wanders Cairo's back-alleys for a few weeks, until she is picked up by the benign street lord Achmed el-Gibar and becomes a prolific thief; among her victims is her future mentor Professor X who is there to meet the Shadow King. Following an inner urge, she wanders into the Serengeti as a teenager and meets T'Challa, who would become her future husband. Despite strong mutual feelings, the two part ways.

In the Serengeti, Ororo first displays her mutant ability to control the weather. Sometime after this, she met the witch-priestess, Ainet, who took her in and became her surrogate mother. Once, when their village was going through a terrible drought, Storm commanded rain for days just to help them. By doing this, she threw off the natural order of nature, and droughts were formed over numerous villages, and hundreds of animals were killed. Sensing the damage she had done, Ainet told Storm that her kind but poorly considered gesture had unintended consequences. Ainet took this opportunity to explain to Ororo how her powers worked with nature, and how she could fix the problem by properly distributing rain.

For a time, she is worshiped as a rain goddess to an African tribe, practicing nudism and tribal spirituality, before being recruited by Professor X into the X-Men. Ororo receives the code name "Storm" and is established as a strong, serene character. In her early career with the X-Men, she suffers a major claustrophobic attack, which prompts a revelation of her origin to her teammates. Jean Grey becomes a close friend as Ororo acclimatizes to the team and the United States, the two supporting each other as the only female X-Men. When Magneto captures the team, Storm frees the X-Men from captivity. Storm is later captured by the White Queen, leading up to the X-Men's clash with Dark Phoenix. She becomes deputy leader of the X-Men, and supplants her colleague Cyclops as leader of the X-Men, a role she fills out during most of her time as a superhero. She briefly became "Rogue Storm", and even switched bodies with the White Queen. She is attacked by Dracula, and defeats Callisto, becoming the new leader of the Morlocks. Following her leadership of the Morlocks through combat with Callisto, Storm begins to develop a darker side. Eventually, the X-Men are invited to Japan for Wolverine's wedding to Mariko Yashida. It is here that she meets Wolverine's old friend Yukio, and the two become fast friends. Storm is inspired by Yukio, who encourages Storm to embrace her emerging darker side. This leads Storm to drastically change her outward appearance to match her inner self and thus don her iconic punk drab.

In a storyline that began in 1984, Storm is deprived of her superhuman powers by an energy weapon fired by Henry Peter Gyrich; unknown to her, this device was designed by the mutant inventor Forge. The depowered Ororo subsequently meets and falls in love with Forge, but leaves him when she discovers that he is the inventor of the weapon behind her power loss. She helps Forge battle Dire Wraiths, before leaving him to rejoin the X-Men. She aids the New Mutants against the Shadow King Amahl Farouk. She next journeys to Asgard with the X-Men, where she is briefly enslaved by Loki. She is nearly killed in a confrontation with Andreas von Strucker. She defeats Cyclops in a competition to become the X-Men's leader. During the "Fall of the Mutants" storyline, she is reunited with Forge, regains her superhuman powers, and dies with the X-Men in giving her life force to defeat the Adversary; she is resurrected by Roma. She is reverted to childhood by the mutant Nanny, meets Gambit, and is finally returned to adulthood – however, she is enslaved by the Genoshans, but regains her free will and escapes captivity. Concerning her personal life, she is for a long time romantically involved with fellow X-Man Forge, and even considers marrying him before their relationship dissolves.

After 90% of the mutants of the world lose their powers, Storm leaves the X-Men to go to Africa. She rekindles her relationship with T'Challa, now a superhero known as Black Panther, marries him, and becomes the queen of the kingdom of Wakanda. She joins the new Fantastic Four alongside her husband when Reed and Sue take a vacation. On a mission in space, the Watcher tells Black Panther and Storm that their children will have a special destiny. Upon Reed's and Sue's return to the Fantastic Four, Storm and the Black Panther leave, with Storm returning to the Uncanny X-Men to help out with events in Messiah Complex. After joining with the X-Men again, Storm is confronted by Cyclops over her position as an X-Man and a Queen. Cyclops reminds her that she made him choose between family and duty before, and she needs to make the same decision. Storm reacts by returning to Wakanda to face a despondent Black Panther, with the two seemingly falling out with each other, although it is later revealed that the Black Panther had been possessed by the Shadow King. After incapacitating the possessed T'Challa, Storm battles Cyclops, who had been mentally enthralled by the Shadow King to kill the other X-Men. After being forced to drive him out by striking Cyclops through the chest with a massive lightning bolt, the Shadow King then takes control of Storm, only to be devoured in vengeance by Bast, the Panther God, who had agreed to hide inside of Storm's mind to take revenge on the Shadow King for possessing T'Challa.

Around the early 2010s, Storm assumes a leadership position in a team operating from the island of Utopia, near San Francisco, after the X-Men: Schism. She took Cyclops's side in the Schism and thus becomes a member of his new X-Tinction Team. After Avengers vs. X-Men, when T'Challa officially annuls their marriage, Storm returns to Wolverine's side and they both begin a relationship. During Marvel NOW! (early- to mid-2010s), she also goes back to a punk mohawk look with a new costume, and becomes a member of the Uncanny X-Force (with Psylocke, Spiral, Puck, and a female Fantomex) and of an all-female incarnation of X-Men (with Jubilee, Rachel Grey, Rogue, Psylocke, Omega Sentinel and Monet/M). She also stars in her own short-lived solo title.

After the Marvel Universe reboot in the Secret Wars crossover (2015), Storm returns to the fold in Extraordinay X-Men, trying to deal with a new plague called M-Pox. The M-Pox is based on the dispersal on the atmosphere of the Terrigen Mists, and this situation rises the tensions between mutants and Inhumans, culminating in the crossover Inhumans vs. X-Men.

When Kitty Pryde returns from space to lead the X-Men, Storm joins her and a few familiar faces in the new X-Men Gold title. During the same period, she also rekindles her friendship with a resurrected Jean Grey and joins her Red team.

In the new status quo for mutants post House of X and Powers of X, Professor X and Magneto invite all mutants to live on Krakoa and welcome even former enemies into their fold. Storm takes part in a quasi-religious ceremony to welcome their newly resurrected comrades, after an attack on an Orchis-made Master Mold base in space.

Storm is seen attacking the last compound of Orchis on Earth with Magneto, Polaris and Cyclops. She also is part of the Marauders crew with White Queen, Captain Kitty Pryde, Iceman, Pyro and Bishop.

Another parallel storyline involves her attempts to find a cure for a techno-organic infection. Later, after the Hellfire Gala and the terraforming of planet Mars, Storm leaves the Marauders and becomes the regent of Arakko and Voice of the Sol System.

== Powers and abilities ==
=== Weather control ===
Storm wielding her Stormcaster in X-Men: Gold #25. Art by Paulo Siqueira.

Storm is one of the most powerful mutants on Earth and has demonstrated a plethora of abilities, most of which are facets of her power to manipulate the weather. Storm possesses the psionic ability to control all forms of weather over vast areas. She has been able to control both terrestrial and extraterrestrial ecosystems. She can modify the temperature of the environment, control all forms of precipitation, humidity, and moisture (at a molecular level), generate lightning and other electromagnetic atmospheric phenomena, and has demonstrated control over atmospheric pressure. She can incite all forms of meteorological tempests, such as tornadoes, thunderstorms, blizzards, and hurricanes, as well as mist. She can dissipate such weather to form clear skies as well.

Her precise control over the atmosphere allows her to create special weather effects. She can create precipitation at higher or lower altitudes than normal, make whirlwinds travel pointing lengthwise in any direction, channel ambient electromagnetism through her body to generate electric blasts, flash freeze objects and people, coalesce atmospheric pollutants into acid rain or toxic fog, and summon wind currents strong enough to support her weight to elevate herself (or others) to fly at high altitudes and speeds. Her control is so great that she can even manipulate the air in a person's lungs. She can also control the pressure inside the human inner ear, an ability she uses to cause intense pain. She can bend light using moisture in the air and her manipulation of mist and fog to appear partially transparent, and in later comics, nearly invisible.

Storm has also demonstrated the ability to control natural forces that include cosmic storms, solar wind, ocean currents, and the electromagnetic field. She has demonstrated the ability to separate water molecules into oxygen and hydrogen via electrolysis, allowing her to breathe underwater. While in outer space, she is able to affect and manipulate the interstellar and intergalactic media. Storm can alter her visual perceptions so as to see the universe in terms of energy patterns, detecting the flow of kinetic, thermal and electromagnetic energy behind weather phenomena and can bend this energy to her will.

Storm has been shown to be sensitive to the dynamics of the natural world, and her psionic powers over the weather are affected by her emotions. One consequence of this connection to nature is that she often suppresses extreme feelings to prevent her emotional state from resulting in violent weather. Storm can view the Earth as weather patterns, and is able to precisely recognize her geographic position through interpretations of these patterns. Storm's mutant abilities are limited by her willpower and the strength of her body.

=== Magical potential ===
Storm's ancestry supports the use of magic and witchcraft. Many of her ancestors were sorceresses and priestesses. Storm's matrilineal powers have even been linked to the real-world Rain Queens of Balobedu, the region from which her Sorceress Supreme ancestor from the Hyborian Age, Ayosha, hails. The Mystic Arcana series deals with Storm's ancestor Ashake, who worships the Egyptian goddess Ma'at, also known as Oshtur – the mother of Agamotto. For some unknown reason, since the dawn of Atlantis, this line of African women has been given distinguishing features of white hair, blue eyes, and powerful magic potential. Although Storm has not developed her magical potential, it has been hinted at. The Mystic Arcana series lists the characters with magic potential according to the Marvel Tarot deck. The Tarot asserts Storm as being "High Priestess", the First Tarot's choice one-third of the time. The other draws were the Scarlet Witch and Agatha Harkness. These three characters split the High Priestess card equally. A timeline-divergent Storm became the sorceress who taught sorcery to Magik and some of Storm's alternate universe selves possess considerable magical talent. On a separate note, it has been stated that Storm's spirit is so strong that she was able to host the consciousness of an avatar (or "manifestation body") of Eternity; in a gathering consisting of herself, Doctor Strange, Black Panther, Silver Surfer and the Fantastic Four, she and Doctor Strange were the only viable candidates. In Wakanda, Storm is called Hadari-Yao ("Walker of Clouds" in ancient Alkamite), a goddess who preserves the balance of natural things.

=== Combat and thievery ===
Storm's willpower is strong enough to defy Dracula's commands after he bites her. She is an expert thief, and a skilled, cunning and gifted hand-to-hand fighter, trained by Achmed el-Gibar, Professor X, Wolverine and Black Panther. By strategy, Storm has overcome physically stronger foes like Callisto and the Crimson Commando in hand-to-hand combat. Storm is an excellent marksman with handguns, and is proficient in the use of knives. Storm is also fluent in Russian, Arabic, and Swahili. As part of her paraphernalia, Storm carries a set of lock-picks (with which she has an extraordinary ability at picking locks, including her teeth while her physical coordination was reduced to the level of an infant) and her ancestral ruby, which allows inter-dimensional transportation with the help of her lightning.

=== Physical abilities and traits ===
Storm's weather powers allow her body to compensate for climate extremes; on one occasion as she was trying to control an unnatural storm she becomes overwhelmed as her body temperature rises too high. In The Official Handbook of the Marvel Universe – X-Men (2004), it is stated that her powers enable her to breathe while moving at any speed and protect her from air friction, while granting her protection from temperature extremes of heat and cold. The All-New Official Handbook of the Marvel Universe Update #1 (2007) states that Storm's body changes temperature to adapt to her environment.

Her body compensates for rapid decreases or increases in atmospheric pressure. She can see in near-complete darkness and has superb dexterity. Storm has one of the strongest wills among the X-Men, making her highly resistant to psychic attacks especially in tandem with electrical fields she creates around herself. Telepaths have found it difficult to track her down and probe her thoughts. Several of these traits are independent of her mutant status and are a result of her ancestry. Also, when using her powers, Storm's eyes turn solid white.

Storm was stated to be an "Omega-Level Mutate", grouping her with powerful omega-level mutants such as Iceman and Rachel Grey. Her Omega-Level status was eventually confirmed.

== Themes and motifs ==
Storm is among the most famous Black female superheroes, and as a result has been widely viewed as an icon of third wave feminism and intersectionality, conceptual innovations that address the intertwining of race and gender. Gladys L. Knight, author of Female Action Heroes: A Guide to Women in Comics, Video games, Film, and Television (2010) wrote that "two defining aspects of her persona are her racial identity and her social status as a mutant." The X-Men have symbolically represented marginalized minorities and the debut of the X-Men series coincided with the Civil Rights Movement, in which their plight as mutants mirrored that of African Americans. Storm's creation in particular "was during the heyday of blaxploitation films."

J. Andrew Deman argues that her early appearances are somewhat stereotypical and demonstrate sexual exoticism, catering to the male gaze. Carol Cooper also views the early appearances of the character as emblematic of "the mythic earth-mother/matriarch figure critiqued by many black feminists as both unrealistic and racist in its glib projection of inhuman perfection." While Storm has always been presented as a Black woman, she is also often drawn with more European features and canonically has blue eyes; some have criticized these choices as concessions to aesthetic standards of white Americans.

However, Ramzi Fawaz writes, "Ororo is a character with few, if any, genuine antecedents in American superhero comic books: a superpowered black woman, who grew up a vagabond." Many scholars, such as Deborah Whaley, have argued that in subsequent appearances she overcomes these stereotypical origins to become "a visionary social subject that propels social change." Storm's leadership of the X-Men has been read as a utopian vision of overcoming racism and sexism. Fawaz argues that Storm "represents a new affective relation between the teammates that derails the heterosexual order that had prevailed in the original team." Fawaz interprets Storm as embodying the "black female disco diva" that dominated gay and African American visual culture" by means of her costume and "hyperbolic performance of an 'African goddess' persona." Fawaz is particularly interested in Storm's bond with Jean Grey in the mid-1970s, which he sees as a representation of "radical political attempts to articulate cross-racial alliances and mutual recognition between women."

Storm also unites African-American and continental African notions of Black identity, particularly in the storyline which she takes a leave of absence of the X-Men in order to return to her homeland for a year, titled Lifedeath II. While Deman writes that some of the depictions of Africa are stereotypical, the illustration of a diasporic identity and its links to ancestry are potentially progressive for readers. Since then, Storm has become a notable fictional example of a contemporary African woman. In 2014, Karen Attiah of The Washington Post asserted, "African women are having a bit of a moment in American pop culture. From Nigerian author Chimamanda Adichie to Ghanaian-Nigerian author Taiye Selasie, to Kenyan star Lupita Nyong'o, African immigrant women are finding that their stories and performances resonate with American audiences. Now, a fictional woman is joining their ranks: Ororo Munroe, known as Storm, a member of Marvel's X-Men team. [...] Even as a supporting character or member of an ensemble, Storm's done it all. She's been an African queen, a street thief, an X-Men team leader and the headmistress of the Jean Grey School of Higher Learning. In the world of comic book fantasy where black characters are scarce, the fact that Storm was one of the most powerful mutants in the X-Men universe was a point of pride growing up."

== Supporting characters ==
=== Allies ===
Storm has notable bonds with all of the main X-Men. In the first period that she led the team, its line-up comprised Wolverine, Nightcrawler, Colossus, Rogue, and Kitty Pryde. In particular, she has a maternal connection to Pryde. Particularly in stories of the 1970s, she has a close friendship with Jean Grey. Ramzi Fawaz views this friendship as an allegory for bonds between the liberation projects of Black women and white women. In stories of the 2010s, she works together with The Crew, an all-Black superhero team that also includes her former husband Black Panther, Luke Cage and Misty Knight. Her friendship with Cage and Knight had been previously established in the 1970s.

=== Romantic relationships and sexuality ===
Storm had a long-standing relationship with Forge that culminated in his proposal of marriage, which he later withdrew as a result of misinterpreting her hesitation. Storm's longest and most prominent relationship is with Black Panther. In 2006, during Reginald Hudlin's authorship of Black Panther, Storm marries Black Panther, and she appeared as a prominent supporting character in many subsequent storylines. Readers and critics compared the wedding to the relationship of Jay-Z and Beyoncé, although they did not marry until two years later. The marriage was later annulled during the events of Avengers vs. X-Men. However, Storm has resumed the relationship in later storylines. Storm also had a significant romantic relationship with Wolverine.

In the Claremont period, Storm's bisexuality is implied. She has a close relationship with Yukio, a partner of Wolverine's. While the characters' relationship was conceived of as romantic, it was relegated to subtext after Marvel Comics' editor-in-chief Jim Shooter mandated that no same-gender couples could be depicted in comic books. Because of this relationship, some secondary sources identify Storm as bisexual. Generally speaking, later storylines do not explore this aspect of Storm's character. In 1994, Uncanny X-Men #312 revisited the relationship between Storm and Yukio; the narrator of the story describes them as "More than friends ... Less than sisters ... these two are kindred spirits."

== Cultural impact and legacy ==
Storm was one of the first Black superheroes in mainstream comic books, and the second Black female superhero in Marvel Comics, after Misty Knight, who debuted in March 1975. She was the third Black female superhero in mainstream comics; DC had previously introduced Nubia, a supporting character for Wonder Woman, in 1973.

In Marvel Comics, other preceding Black characters with superpowers were Black Panther (1966), Hobie Brown (the Prowler) and Falcon (1969), Luke Cage (1972), Blade (1973), and Abe Brown (1974). In DC Comics, she was also preceded by Teen Titans member Mal Duncan who debuted in 1970, Green Lantern wielder John Stewart (1971), and Mister Miracle protégé Shilo Norman (1973).

Since her creation, Storm has remained one of the most prominent and recognizable Black superheroes. Storm is the first Black leader of a Marvel superhero team, as well as the first female leader of a Marvel superhero team.

=== Critical reception ===
Andrew Wheeler of ComicsAlliance described Storm as "the first major black female superhero," stating, "Storm was designed to stand out from previous super-women, and not only by dint of her race. She also had long white hair and strange oval irises, and arguably the most formidable power set in the new team. From the start, her weather-control powers allowed her to summon raging winds and lightning strikes. She was a heavyweight who had been worshiped as a goddess, and there was never any question of her using her powers only to defend or evade. She wasn't introduced as a damsel, and she wasn't introduced as a love interest." Alex Abad-Santos of Vox called Storm "one of Marvel's most iconic characters," saying, "Marvel, for the past couple of years, has built up a notably diverse cast of heroes, and started to get serious about featuring its female leads. But arguably the most iconic non-white character the company has introduced to date is Storm, aka Ororo Munroe, who was first introduced in 1975. Clocking in at 5'11" with white hair, black skin, and the power to control the weather, Storm was startling, beautiful, and something readers had never seen before. She's a big reason writer Greg Pak picked up comic books." Ashanti El of Screen Rant referred to Storm as a "veteran X-Men hero and weather goddess," writing, "Storm's fame in media stems from her unmatched representation as a black woman. In a time when the majority of superheroes were only white men in capes, Ororo broke the mold and proved that diversity in comics was possible and lucrative with the X-Men starring in several pop-culture landmarks, including the popular '90s animated series. A trailblazer among trailblazers, Storm's roles in comics helped to usher in a new wave of comic book heroes like Riri Williams, Lunella Lafayette, and Shuri. Cosplayers and fans also marvel at the mutant's stylish costumes including the iconic self-empowering '80s mohawk look." Danielle Broadway of The Mary Sue stated, "The Marvel character Storm is not only a staple of the X-Men franchise, but also a notorious fan favorite. From her epic weather control powers to her unique style, Storm has stolen the hearts of many. Created by writer Len Wein and artist Dave Cockrum, she's one of the first and only Black woman superheroes in Marvel comics. [...] She illustrates what it means to be a Black woman as she fights to oppose stereotypes, violence, and commodification."

Sara Century of Syfy said, "It's no secret that Ororo Munroe is a FANGRRLS favorite. This is a woman that has been around the world and even a pretty fair amount of the galaxy yet she remains perhaps the most emotionally grounded X-Man. She's an omega level mutant and finds herself regularly seated at tables of Marvel's most powerful players. She has done everything from pickpocket to queen. She is kind of the best." David Harth of CBR.com wrote, "Storm has been on a long strange trip throughout her life in comics, one that's always seen her on an upward trajectory. From a thief on the streets of Cairo to a goddess on the African plains to a superhero and leader of the highest caliber, Ororo Munroe has proven nothing can hold her back. Storm remained one of the most beloved X-Men and an irreplaceable part of the team's mythos. Debuting on a stacked X-Men team, she was still able to stand out. Marvel and the creators who worked on Storm did their best to make her a better character, creating a superhero unlike any other." Chris Arrant of Newsarama wrote, "While her mutant ability to control the weather is a pivotal part of her, thanks to the writers and artists that have added layers to her character, it's Storm the woman and her often dueling qualities of tenacity, anger, forgiveness, and compassion that have forged her into a titan of modern fiction and cemented her into the bedrock foundation of Marvel Comics most important characters." IGN stated, "Storm's ability to manipulate and harness the weather makes her one of the most powerful mutants on Earth. But power like that comes at a great cost. Storm lives every day in a state of carefully maintained composure. Too much stress could be deadly for everyone around her. Fans have seen Storm as a thief, an X-Man, a fighter, and even a queen. Through it all, she remains one of the most relatable mutant heroes."

== In other media ==
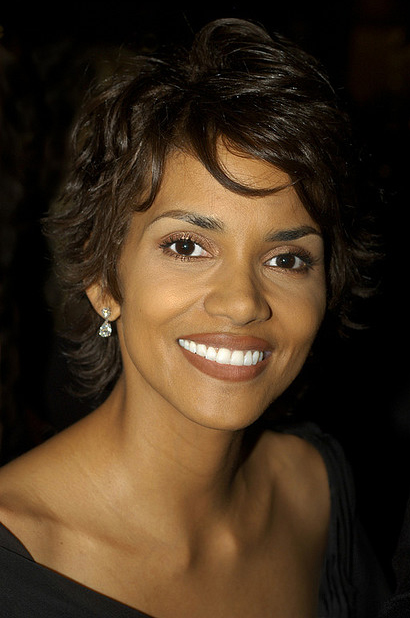
Actress Halle Berry played Storm in the X-Men film series.

Storm has made numerous appearances in other media. She appeared in seven live-action X-Men films produced by 20th Century Fox from 2000 to 2019. She is portrayed by actress Halle Berry in X-Men (2000), X2 (2003), X-Men: The Last Stand (2006), and X-Men: Days of Future Past (2014). A younger version of the character is portrayed by Alexandra Shipp in X-Men: Apocalypse (2016), Deadpool 2 (2018), and X-Men: Dark Phoenix (2019). A version of Storm in the Marvel Cinematic Universe played by Maya Boyd will appear in the untitled MCU X-Men film (2028). In animation, the character is voiced by Iona Morris and Alison Sealy-Smith in X-Men: The Animated Series, X-Men '97, and What If ...? season 3. Other actresses voice the character in X-Men: Evolution and Wolverine and the X-Men.

She has also been in a large number of video games: a guest appearance in Spider-Man: Web of Shadows and a playable character in every game in the X-Men Legends/Marvel: Ultimate Alliance/Marvel: Ultimate Alliance 2 series.
