= Exceptional X-Men =

Marvel Comics series

- The cover to Exceptional X-Men #1, with art by Carmen Carnero and colors by Nolan Woodard.

Publication information
- Publisher: Marvel Comics
- Schedule: Monthly
- Format: Ongoing series
- Genre: Superhero
- Publication date: September 2024 – November 2025
- No. of issues: 13
- Main character(s): Kitty Pryde; Emma Frost; Axo; Bronze; Melee; Iceman

Creative team
- Written by: Eve Ewing
- Artist: Carmen Carnero
- Letterer: Joe Sabino
- Colorist: Nolan Woodard
- Editor: Tom Brevoort

Exceptional X-Men is an American superhero comic book series published by Marvel Comics. The series focuses on Kitty Pryde and Emma Frost as they adapt to life after the Krakoan Age and try to mentor three new mutants, Axo, Bronze, and Melee.

The ongoing series is written by Eve Ewing with art by Carmen Carnero. The first issue was released in September 2024 as part of the X-Men: From the Ashes publishing initiative, which relaunched the X-Men line.

== Publication history ==
In March 2024, the X-Men: From the Ashes initiative was announced, with three core titles: X-Men by Jed MacKay and Ryan Stegman, Uncanny X-Men by Gail Simone and David Marquez, and Exceptional X-Men by Eve Ewing and Carmen Carnero. The book would be centered around Kitty Pryde and Emma Frost mentoring three new mutants after the fall of Krakoa. Per Ewing: "Longtime fans of Kitty Pryde can count on the kinds of adventures you expect from her as a classic favorite, while I hope new and old readers alike will get to love this all-new team of young mutants. Kitty, the one-time kid sister figure of the X-Men, has to reckon with her own memories—good and bad—of being a child of Xavier as she navigates a role as leader and mentor for a new generation of mutants who are trying to make their way in a time of crisis."

In May 2024, more information was revealed, including the main cover. Per Carmen Carnero: "The story Eve brought up really hooked me from the beginning. I found it very interesting to see Kitty away from the X-Men and trying to live a normal life in Chicago, but finding herself with young mutants who have to deal with this post-Krakoa world and Emma's plans."

In September 2024, Marvel released more information about the three new mutants, Bronze, Axo, and Melee, as well as a trailer for the new series that revealed Iceman would be an incoming main character.

== Plot summary ==
Katherine "Kitty" Pryde is working as a bartender at Lulu's Tavern in Chicago, trying to forget about her actions during the Fall of X. While trying to go on a date with a woman named Nina, Kitty ends up saving the life of a young mutant named Trista Marshall (who can turn her skin and hair into a bronze-like metal). Emma Frost telepathically notices this and resolves to get involved. In a special bonus page, Bobby Drake gets on a flight to Chicago. Later on, as Kitty and Nina have their first date at a high school baseball game, a fight breaks out involving two more young mutants, Thao Tran (who can turn invisible and intangible) and Alex Luna (whose skin changes color and causes people nearby to confess their secrets and vulnerabilities). Kitty helps them escape and then helps Thao when she gets stuck with her powers. She gives them Trista's phone number so that they can connect, but when all three show up at her apartment, Emma Frost also arrives and mind controls them to follow her. Kitty gets Emma to stop mind controlling them by fighting her, but Kitty's roommate arrives home to stop them from fighting any further. A conversation between all of them results in deciding that they will co-mentor the three new mutants at a nearby dance studio. During their first class, Trista tells Thao and Alex that she thought up new code names for them: Bronze for Trista, Melee for Thao, and Axo for Alex. Emma arrives to give them their new X-Men uniforms, which Kitty objects to, but they are both interrupted by the arrival of Iceman. Later, when Trista is at school she decides to auditon for a play and feels anxiety about her crush. Meanwhile, Kitty discovers Bobby on a private phone call with Rogue, causing a dispute between her and Bobby about her rejoining the X-Men.

== Reception ==
AiPT gave the first issue an 8.5 out of 10 and wrote, "The book is funny, sweet, and airy – there is no expositional burden, only straightforward emotional grounding and driving action." The Beat stated it was "easily the best of the From The Ashes X-title of the trio." But Why Tho? gave the first issue five stars and wrote, "a beautiful book in both art and writing, with a genuine heart and growing towards something crazier."

AiPT gave the second issue a 9 out of 10 and wrote that it's "another home run issue, further showing that this teen-focused X-Men book has all the DNA of classic X-Men greatness." Graphic Policy gave it an 8 out of 10 and wrote that it "continues to be a delightful slice of life title." The Comic Spot wrote that it "continues its trend of being a serious, yet fun series."

ComicWatch gave the third issue an 8.8 out of 10. Graphic Policy gave it an 8.5 out of 10 and wrote "[w]ith its small, tightknit cast and lack of missions/fight for the sake of fights, Exceptional X-Men is a breath of fresh air in the mutant/superhero space." AiPT gave it a 7.5 out of 10 and wrote that it "delivers a satisfying mix of heartfelt character dynamics, genuine conflict, and compelling teenage mutant drama," but that the "pacing feels uneven."

ScreenRant commented on the fact that Kitty Pryde was finally able to be canonically bisexual and go on dates with women. "It is very exciting that Kitty Pryde's queerness was cemented on-panel in the first issue of this new series (thank you, Eve Ewing!), since she has such a long history of queer subtext, especially during the beloved Claremont era. Hopefully, Kitty's newest era post-Krakoa will give her time and space to explore her sexuality and potentially even get into a relationship with a woman, a development that would interest fans everywhere."
