= Murewa Ayodele =

Nigerian comic book writer

- Born: 15 June 1994 (age 32) Osun State, Nigeria
- Area: Writer
- Notable works: New Men, My Grandfather Was a God, I Am Iron Man, Storm

Murewa Ayodele (born 15 June 1994) is a Nigerian comics writer who has worked for small press and Marvel Comics. He often works with Nigerian artist Dotun Akande, with whom he co-founded Collectible Comics NG, a Nigerian comic book studio. Their comic New Men was nominated for the Nommo Award for Best Graphic Novel.

== Career ==
Ayodele has worked professionally in comics for over ten years. He and artist Dotun Akande met at Redeemer's University, where they began making comics together. Their studio, Collectible Comics NG, created a number of comics including Anarchy, GodKiller, Cliff: Lust and Gravity, Utopia and more.

In 2019, he and Akande released New Men, a "soft biopunk thriller" set in Africa in the year 2030. In 2020, it was released in America by Action Lab Comics.

In 2021, he and Akande launched the Webtoon My Grandfather Was a God. This gained them attention from Marvel Comics, who hired them to do the 2023 five-issue mini-series I Am Iron Man for Iron Man's 60th anniversary. In 2024, it was announced that they would release their next comic, Akogun: Brutalizer of Gods, through Oni Press.

In May 2024, Ayodele was announced as the writer for the upcoming Storm series set during the X-Men: From the Ashes relaunch with artist Lucas Werneck, relaunched after twelve issues as Storm: Earth's Mightiest Mutant; In March 2026, he introduced the character Galacta as "Gail Arakawa" after Gail Simone and Hiromu Arakawa.

== Personal life ==
Ayodele is Yoruba and grew up in Osun State. He went to Redeemer's University, where he got a degree in computer science.

== Bibliography ==
=== Collectible Comics NG ===
- Anarchy (2018)
- Retribution (2018)
- Cliff: Lust and Gravity (2018)
- This Nigerian Drea... Sorry, Reality (2018)
- GodKiller (2019)
- Utopia (2019)

=== Independent Comics ===
- New Men #1–4 (2020), Action Lab Comics
- My Grandfather Was a God #1–8 (2021), Webtoon
- Akogun: Brutalizer of Gods #1–3 (2024), Oni Press

=== Marvel Comics ===
- Avengers Unlimited Infinity Comic #9-13, "The Kaiju War" (2022)
- Iron Man:
  - Iron Man vol. 6 #25, short story "Daddy's Boys" (2022)
  - I Am Iron Man #1–5 (2023)
- Marvel's Voices: Wakanda Forever #1, short story "Remember the Name" (2023)
- Moon Knight: Black, White & Blood #1, short story "So White. Yet, So Dark" (2022)
- X-Men:
  - Storm vol. 5 #1–12 (2024–2025)
  - X-Manhunt Omega #1 (2025)
  - Rogue Storm #1–3 (2025)
  - Storm: Earth's Mightiest Mutant #1–present (2026-present)
