= Alex Paknadel =

English comic book writer

- Born: Alexis Thomas James Paknadel; 1981 (age 44–45) London, England
- Area: Writer
- Notable works: Arcadia, GIGA, All Against All, Redfork, Red Goblin, Carnage, Sentinels

Alex Paknadel (born in 1981) is a British comics writer and academic who has written for Marvel Comics, DC Comics, and small press.

== Career ==
Paknadel's first professionally published a comic book in 2015 with Arcadia through Archaia Entertainment, which was inspired by the documentary All Watched Over by Machines of Loving Grace. In 2017, he co-wrote Assassin's Creed: Uprising alongside Dan Watters and then, in 2018, he published Friendo through Vault Comics, which Paste Magazine listed as one of the 15 Best Sci-Fi & Fantasy Comics of 2018. Paknadel, who is part of White Noise, a "studio/comics collective" that also includes Ram V, Dan Watters, and Ryan O'Sullivan, was then announced to have new comics, including Earthcrosser and, in 2020, Giga, a science-fiction murder mystery with mechas. Also in 2020, Paknadel published Redfork, a horror comic about "the opioid crisis, economic despair, and cosmic as well as capitalistic horror, all seeping into an Appalachian town" through TKO Studios. In 2022, his first Image Comics book was announced, All Against All, which was billed as "Aliens meets Tarzan."

Paknadel began his Marvel career with the 2020 one-shots Lords of Empyre: Celestial Messiah and Lords of Empyre: Swordsman. He followed that up in 2021 by co-writing Immortal Hulk: Time of Monsters with Al Ewing and then writing the tie-ins Death of Doctor Strange: Avengers and Darkhold: Spider-Man. In 2023, he was announced as the writer, alongside artist Jan Bazaldua, for Red Goblin, about Normie Osborn, the Green Goblin's grandson, and his symbiote "Rascal". "He has in his possession a weapon that could well unleash the sadism and depravity his family name makes him heir to, but he's choosing to go the other way. In brief, I want people to root for this poor kid and his weird murderous pal because although the path they're walking is crooked and perilous, the end goal is truly noble." At the same time, he took over writing Carnage and co-wrote, alongside writer Cody Ziglar, the crossover Carnage Reigns.

In 2022, he was announced as the co-writer, alongside Matthew Rosenberg, of DC vs. Vampires: All-Out War, a six-issue mini-series. He then went on to write Knight Terrors: The Flash and stories in Lazarus Planet: Legends Reborn and in Batman: Urban Legends. In 2024, he wrote backup stories in Detective Comics during Ram V's run focusing on the Batgirl Cassandra Cain.

In 2024, he was announced as the main writer for the X-Men: From the Ashes Infinity Comic. "In some respects, my job here in these first arcs is to bridge the gap between Krakoa and the new status quo." He was then announced as the writer for the upcoming X-Men mini-series Sentinels. Unlike previous Sentinels, these new Sentinels are human cyborgs who have been augmented with Sentinel nanotechnology and set to hunt evil mutants. "Being a Reaver is a hideous calling; being one of our new Sentinels is a job. Many would argue — not without merit — that the latter is worse, and that ethical quagmire is kind of where this series lives. At what point does blindly following orders make you complicit?"

Paknadel was also announced as the writer for the Cult of the Lamb comic adaptation in 2024 and contributed to the Scream! 40th Anniversary Special put out by Rebellion Publishing.

In 2025, it was announced that Paknadel would be writing the Teenage Mutant Ninja Turtles spin-off miniseries, Teenage Mutant Ninja Turtles: Casey Jones for IDW Publishing. The series, illustrated Amancay Nahuelpan, is expected to run for six issues and will begin publication in September 2025.

== Personal life ==
He lives in London, England, and graduated with a PhD in English literature from Lancaster University. Before writing comics, he worked for a digital marketing company. He is the son of mystery writer Barbara Nadel.

== Bibliography ==
=== Marvel Comics ===
- Carnage
  - Carnage vol 3 #11-14 (2023)
  - Carnage Reigns Alpha #1 (2023)
  - Red Goblin #1-10 (2023)
- Darkhold: Spider-Man #1 (2021)
- Death of Doctor Strange: Avengers #1 (2021)
- Empyre
  - Lords of Empyre: Celestial Messiah #1 (2020)
  - Lords of Empyre: Swordsman #1 (2020)
- Immortal Hulk: Time of Monsters #1 (2021)
- X-Men
  - X-Men Unlimited Infinity Comic #35-40, 42–43, 59 (2022)
  - X-Men: From the Ashes Infinity Comic #1-21 (2024)
  - Sentinels #1-5 (2024–2025)

=== DC Comics ===
- Absolute Power: Task Force VII #5 (2024)
- Batman
  - Batman: Urban Legends #17, short story "Statecraft" (2022)
  - Detective Comics #1084-1086, backups (2024)
  - The Joker vol 2 #14, short story "Knock Knock" (2022)
- Dark Crisis: The Deadly Green #1 (2022)
- DC vs. Vampires: All-Out War #1-6 (2022–2023)
- Knight Terrors: The Flash #1-2 (2023)
- Lazarus Planet: Legends Reborn #1, short story "Trilogy" (2023)
- Titans: Beast World Tour: Central City #1, short story "Gimme the Volts" (2024)

=== Other Comics ===
==== Image Comics ====
- All Against All #1-5 (2022–2023

==== Boom! Studios ====
- Arcadia #1-8 (2015–2016)
- Turncoat #1-4 (2016)

==== Titan Comics ====
- Assassin's Creed: Uprising #1-8 (2017)
- Free Comic Book Day 2017: Doctor Who #1 (2017)
- Doctor Who: The Eleventh Doctor, Year Three #3, 7, 9 (2017–2018)
- Little Nightmares #1 (2017)

==== TKO Studios ====
- Redfork #1-6 (2020)
- TKO Shorts

==== Vault Comics ====
- GIGA #1-5 (2020–2023)

==== Valiant Entertainment ====
- Incursion #1-4 (2019)
