= X-Men (comic book) =

Ongoing American comic book series

- Variant cover of X-Men (vol. 3) #7. Art by Chris Bachalo.

Publication information
- Publisher: Marvel Comics
- Schedule: Monthly
- Format: Ongoing series
- Genre: Superhero
- Publication date: (vol. 3); September 2010 – February 2013 (vol. 4); May 2013 – May 2015 (vol. 5) October 2019 – June 2021 (vol. 6) July 2021 – June 2024 (vol. 7); July 2024 – Present
- No. of issues: (vol. 3); 41, plus 1 Giant-Size issue (vol. 4); 26 (vol. 5); 21 (vol. 6); 35 (vol. 7); 12
- Main characters: See characters list

Creative team as of July 2024
- Written by: (vol. 3); Victor Gischler (2010–2012); Brian Wood (2012); Seth Peck (2012–2013); (vol. 4); Brian Wood (2013–2014); Marc Guggenheim (2014); G. Willow Wilson (2015); (vol. 5); Jonathan Hickman (2019–2021); (vol. 6); Gerry Duggan (2021–2024); (vol. 7); Jed MacKay (2024–present)
- Artist: Various
- Letterer: Joe Caramagna
- Colorist: Rachelle Rosenberg
- Editor(s): Axel Alonso; Nick Lowe; Jeanine Schaefer

X-Men is an ongoing American comic book series featuring the titular team of superheroes, published by Marvel Comics, beginning in September 2010.

The series was preceded by The X-Men vol. 1 (renamed The Uncanny X-Men in 1978) and X-Men: Legacy (initially known as X-Men vol. 2) from 1991 to 2001, New X-Men from 2001 to 2004 and again X-Men from 2004 to 2008).

Volume 3 began publication in September 2010 and, for most of its run featuring team-ups between the X-Men and other Marvel characters, ended at issue #41 in February 2013. As part of Marvel NOW!, the title was relaunched as a new series (volume 4) written by Brian Wood and featuring an all-female team. X-Men was relaunched as the flagship title again in October 2019 following Jonathan Hickman's House of X and Powers of X, with Hickman writing and art by Leinil Francis Yu. As the fifth volume of the title, the series ran for 21 issues, before it was subsequently relaunched as volume 6 (written by Gerry Duggan) in July 2021. The sixth volume ran for 35 issues through the rest of the Krakoan Age. A seventh volume, written by Jed MacKay, launched in July 2024.

== Publication history ==
=== Preceding volumes ===
The first series (vol. 1) went through several title changes: it started as The X-Men in 1963, switched to just X-Men in the cover title of issue #50, later changed to The Uncanny X-Men in 1978 with issue #114 with the cover title in issue #394 becoming Uncanny X-Men. In 1991, a second series (vol. 2) titled X-Men was launched alongside the still ongoing Uncanny X-Men. The series title changed to New X-Men in 2001 and then switched to X-Men: Legacy with issue #208 in 2008.

=== Volume 3 (2010–2013) ===
In 2010, a third volume of X-Men was launched. To distinguish itself from the other contemporary X-Men titles, this third volume of X-Men was conceived as a title that would focus on the mutants' role in the wider Marvel Universe and "...firmly integrate the X-Men in the Marvel Universe." As a result, the initial story arcs featured a guest appearance from characters from the Marvel Universe ranging from Spider-Man to Blade.

In April 2010, at Chicago Comics & Entertainment Expo, it was announced that the relaunched series would be helmed by writer Victor Gischler with art by Paco Medina. Gischler commented that "the X-Men have been fighting for survival for a long time, but this is the X-Men team the represents a new era. This team engages the Marvel U more in a proactive, mission-oriented way. [...] The particular situation or villains they face will help dictate which guest star is most appropriate for a particular arc". Gischler wrote the first 29 issues and In 2012, was replaced by Brian Wood who wrote issues #30–37. Olivier Coipel joined as the series artist. Wood took the series in a new direction, focusing on Storm leading a security team of X-Men and dropping the 'team-up' element that was previously a part of the book.

The team-up elements were briefly brought back in issues #38 and 39. Seth Peck was the writer for issues #38–41 before it was cancelled in November 2012; the series ended in February 2013.

=== Volume 4 (2013–2015) ===
As part of Marvel NOW!, the series was relaunched and it was the first time in the history of the X-Men franchise to have a series composed entirely of female X-Men, with an initial roster of Jubilee, Storm, Rogue, Kitty Pryde, Rachel Grey, and Psylocke. The series brought back both writer Brian Wood with artist by Olivier Coipel. On the roster shift, Wood commented:

I think this title here will be an interesting test case, to see if a high-profile book with a high-profile artist and marquee characters can indeed overcome what often happens to books starring female heroes. I think we have a good shot, but even now, based only off the announcement, there's all sorts of negative feedback that ranges from generic sexism, to open hostility, and to lame charges of reverse sexism. Chances are this book will launch very high, but if we can keep it high and resist the typical decline that happens to female-led superhero comics, we'll have proved something and maybe even set a precedent, and that would be fantastic.

The first issue was released in May 2013. Coipel left the series after the fourth issue; David Lopez and Terry Dodson then rotated on "art duties". Wood left the series in 2014 with issue #17, saying, "I left the title on my own accord, no drama, no pressure, just moving on".

Marc Guggenheim took over the title starting with issue #18 in August 2014; his last issue was #22 in December 2014. G. Willow Wilson was then brought on to write the 4 issue (#23–26) arc "The Burning World" in 2015; Wilson was the "first female writer to work on X-Men" since the relaunch "with an all-female X-Men roster". The 2014 New York Comic Con "Women of Marvel" panel highlighted that each issue "of the story will be told from a different character's point of view". Marvel then cancelled its entire publishing line, including X-Men, for the Secret Wars (2015) event storyline. X-Men was not continued during the post-Secret Wars publishing initiative All-New, All-Different Marvel (2015–2019).

=== Volume 5 (2019–2021) ===
2022 omnibus edition cover which collects Hickman's entire run. Art by Leinil Francis Yu.

As part of Marvel's "Dawn of X" initiative following Jonathan Hickman's relaunch of the Marvel X-Men line, X-Men relaunched in October 2019, written by Hickman and with art by Leinil Francis Yu. Although the first cover featured the extended Summers family (Cyclops, Havok, Vulcan, Corsair, Cable, Jean Grey, Rachel Summers) with Wolverine, Hickman had stated that this book is intended to be an "all-encompassing mutant title" and the cast is subject to change. For example, issue #4 featured Xavier, Magneto, and Apocalypse attending the World Economic Forum while issue #5 featured a team consisting of X-23, Synch, and Darwin assembled for a mission by the Quiet Council of Krakoa. In 2021, X-Men Group Editor Jordan White commented that "from a certain point of view, all Krakoan citizens are X-Men. But officially, there hasn't been a proper team with that name since we ended the Uncanny run". The volume was also marked by delays in the release of individual issues.

The series concluded with issue #21 in July 2021. Following the end of his run, Hickman explained that a big regret he had was not using X-Men to "execute the launch of the entire X-Line" as his "initial idea" for the title was for it to be a "springboard for the other books" with each issue weaving in problems that would be addressed by the next new title. On centering X-Men as an anthology "around Cyclops and his family", Hickman commented that "I dig the whole Summers clan, but the original idea behind the book was kind of a travelogue for Krakoa, with Cyclops being our guide. It was supposed to just be 12 issues and very different when it was first planned out, and that obviously changed a lot by the time I got to write issue one".

=== Volume 6 (2021–2024) ===
This volume was launched during the "Reign of X" initiative, continued through "Destiny of X" and concluded with the end of "Fall of X" with issue #35 (legacy Uncanny X-Men #700). It was written by Gerry Duggan with art by Pepe Larraz and Javier Pina. The initial roster included Cyclops (who at one point would operate as Captain Krakoa), Marvel Girl, Rogue, Wolverine, Synch, Sunfire and Polaris – White highlighted that "the first Krakoan X-Men team will debut to the world at the Hellfire Gala". Following the announcement of a new volume, SyFy Wire commented that while volume 5 was titled X-Men the "book never actually featured a team of mutant superheroes going out and doing missions for the betterment of the planet. The age of Krakoa has left the mutants more insular, more isolated from a world that still perhaps hates and fears them, but after the events of X of Swords and the near-invasion of Earth that stemmed from that clash, Cyclops and Marvel Girl decided it was time for a change. The world, they argued, needs the X-Men again".

It was announced in July 2022 that Joshua Cassara and C.F. Villa would take over art duties for the series.

=== Volume 7 (2024–present) ===
In the post-Krakoan Age, the X-Men are based in Alaska with an initial roster of "Cyclops, Beast, Magneto, Psylocke, Kid Omega, Temper (formerly Oya), Magik and Juggernaut". It was written by Jed MacKay with art by Ryan Stegman; the first issue was released in July 2024. On the setup of the series, MacKay explained that Cyclops is "running this team, he's established basically the territory that this group works in and the philosophy they work within. However, this is certainly a position that isn't necessarily meeting with mainstream approval. [...] So as we go on, we're going to explore a little bit what it means to be X-Men in this post-Krakoa world and to be X-Men in such a loud and visible manner. [...] They live in a building with a big 'X' on the front – they're not exactly hiding from anyone".

== Plot summary ==
=== Volume 3 (2010 series) ===
The first story arc, "Curse of the Mutants", comprising issues #1–6, involves the X-Men battling the vampire nations and teaming up with Blade.

The second story arc, "To Serve and Protect", comprising issues #7–10, involves the team of Storm, Gambit, Emma Frost and Wolverine returning to New York, where they team up with Spider-Man to battle the Lizard and the Dark Beast in the sewers of Manhattan.

An interlude story then followed with Professor X telling Jubilee of an earlier encounter he had with the vampire Raizo Kodo. This was followed by the "First to Last" storyline, which began with X-Men Giant-Size #1 and saw the original X-Men appear in flashback scenes of a previously untold adventure.

Another one-shot story saw a team of X-Men team up with the new female Ghost Rider to battle a mystical enemy. A later storyline featured the Future Foundation teaming up with the X-Men, where they also encountered Skull the Slayer. Following on from the 2011 "Regenesis" event among the X-titles, Marvel announced that X-Men is among the titles aligned with Cyclops's vision of the X-Men and feature a more covert group of characters, with Colossus, Domino, Jubilee, Psylocke, Storm and Warpath being the initial lineup. The team-up aspect of the title remained, with the first arc featuring War Machine. This was followed by the return of Raizo Kodo for an arc dealing with Jubilee's vampirism.

The title then took on a change in direction; with the exits of Warpath and Jubilee from the cast and the addition of Pixie, the storyline focused on Storm leading a "security team" of X-Men dealing with potential threats to mutants.

Issue #38 featured a return to the team-up elements of the book and features Domino and Daredevil.

=== Volume 5 (2019 series) ===
Following the events of House of X and Powers of X, the mutants of Earth adjust to life on Krakoa and work to build a new society. Cyclops, now living on the Moon, invites his father Corsair for a family dinner and gifts him a Krakoan flower for free travel to the island. Meanwhile, Orchis, weakened after its defeat in House of X/Powers of X, suffers another setback when Cyclops, Storm, Magneto and Polaris liberate captured mutants from one of their vaults. Orchis' director, Devo, remains determined to retaliate.

A new sentient island, Arakko, appears near Krakoa, and the two landmasses move toward each other. Cyclops, Prestige and Cable investigate, battling monsters before Prestige mediates peace with Arakko's envoy. The envoy meets Apocalypse and warns of a coming danger.

Krakoa's defenses are compromised when Pixie and Anole are attacked by elderly women with advanced tech who somehow bypass the gates. Their assault causes Krakoa physical pain, sensed by the island's telepaths. Cyclops, Emma Frost and Sebastian Shaw confront the culprits—an eco-terrorist group called Hordeculture. The group, radical botanists seeking control of the world's food supply, defeats the X-Men and escapes with stolen Krakoan flowers. Cyclops and his team report the threat to the Krakoan Council.

Elsewhere, Professor X, Magneto, Apocalypse, Cyclops and Gorgon attend an economic summit in Switzerland. As Professor X detects approaching strike teams, Cyclops and Gorgon dispatch them while Magneto addresses the dignitaries, criticizing humanity's failings. Xavier warns that aggression against Krakoa will not be tolerated.

Later, Wolverine tracks a posthuman fugitive from Orchis but is recalled when she re-enters a secure vault. With Professor X and Magneto's approval, Wolverine joins Cyclops, Storm and Armor to distract the vault's defenses while X-23, Darwin and Synch infiltrate it. Five months pass with no word from the infiltration team, leaving Cyclops to regret the mission.

During the earlier attack on Orchis, Mystique planted a Krakoan gateway for intelligence gathering, on the condition that her wife Destiny would be resurrected. After dying during the mission and being revived, Mystique is informed by Magneto that Destiny's resurrection will be delayed until Mystique proves her success. Disguised as a scientist on the Orchis station, she delivers a component from Devo to Doctor Gregor, who is attempting to revive her late husband, killed by the X-Men. Mystique reports back but is told she must do more, fueling her anger.

Mystique recalls Destiny's prophecy that she would be denied the one thing she wanted most. Destiny's words urge her to ensure her return "at any cost", even if it means burning Krakoa to the ground.

== List of characters ==
=== Appearing in Volume 3 (2010 series) ===
Issues	Characters	Guest star
#1–6	"Curse of the Mutants" crossover storyline	Blade the Vampire-Slayer
#7–10	Emma Frost, Gambit, Storm, Wolverine	Spider-Man
#11	Jubilee, Professor X	Raizo Kodo
Giant-Size #1, #12–15	Archangel, Colossus, Cyclops, Emma Frost, Iceman, Magneto, Namor the Sub-Mariner, Pixie, Psylocke, Storm, Wolverine	the original X-Men
#15.1	Colossus, Cyclops, Gambit, Danielle Moonstar, Pixie, Storm	Ghost Rider (Alejandra Jones)
#16–19	Cyclops, Doctor Nemesis, Emma Frost, Magneto, Pixie, Wolverine	The FF and Skull the Slayer
#20–23	Colossus, Domino, Jubilee, Psylocke, Storm, Warpath	War Machine
#24–27	Colossus, Domino, Jubilee, Psylocke, Storm, Warpath	Raizo Kodo and the Forgiven
#28–29	Domino, Pixie, Storm, Warpath	The FF and Spider-Man
#30–37	Colossus, Domino, Pixie, Psylocke, Storm	none
#38–39	Domino	Daredevil
#40–41	Angel, Chamber, Iceman, Pixie, Storm	none

=== Appearing in Volume 4 (2013 series) ===
Issues	Characters
#1–4	Jubilee, Kitty Pryde, Psylocke, Rachel Grey, Rogue, Storm
#5–6	"Battle of the Atom" crossover
#7–12	Jubilee, Karima Shapandar, M, Psylocke, Rachel Grey, Storm
#13–17	Jubilee, M, Psylocke, Rachel Grey, Storm
#18–22	Cecilia Reyes, Jubilee, M, Psylocke, Rachel Grey, Storm
#23–26	Beast, Gambit, Jubilee, M, Psylocke, Rachel Grey, Storm

=== Appearing in Volume 5 (2019 series) ===
Issues	Characters
#1	Cable; Cecilia Reyes; Corsair; Cyclops; Havok; Jean Grey; Magneto; Polaris; Rachel Summers (Note: credited as Prestige); Storm; Vulcan; Wolverine
#2	Cable; Cyclops; Rachel Summers
#3	Cyclops; Emma Frost (Note: credited as the White Queen); Sebastian Shaw (Note: Credited as Black King)
#4	Apocalypse; Cyclops; Gorgon; Magneto; Professor X
#5	Armor; Cyclops; Darwin; Professor X; Storm; Synch; X-23; Wolverine
#6	Magneto; Mystique; Professor X
#7	Aero; Apocalypse; Cannonball; Cypher; Cyclops; Exodus; Husk; Icarus; Nightcrawler; Wolverine
#8	Broo; Cyclops; Havok; Jean Grey; Magma; Magik; Mirage; Oya; Sunspot; Vulcan; Wolfsbane
#9	Broo; Cannonball; Corsair; Cyclops; Havok; Jean Grey; Sunspot; Vulcan
#10	Petra; Sway; Vulcan
#11	Anole; Exodus; Iceman; Loa; Magik; Magma; Magneto; Rockslide; Summoner
#12	Anole; Apocalypse; Loa; Rockslide; Summoner
#13	Apocalypse; the Banshee; Beast; Cecilia Reyes; Gorgon; Healer; Hope Summers; Magneto; Polaris; Professor X
#14	Apocalypse; Genesis
#15	Apocalypse; Cyclops; Emma Frost; Exodus; Genesis; Jean Grey (Note: Credited as Marvel Girl); Kate Pryde; Magneto; Mister Sinister; Mystique; Nightcrawler; Professor X; Saturnyne; Sebastian Shaw
#16	Cable; Cyclops; Cypher; Emma Frost; Exodus; Isca the Unbeaten; Jean Grey; Kate Pryde; Magneto; Mister Sinister; Mystique; Nightcrawler; Professor X; Rachel Summers; Sebastian Shaw; Storm
#17	Cannonball; Cyclops; Deathbird; Gladiator; Jean Grey; Oracle; Smasher; Storm; Sunspot; Xandra
#18–19	Darwin; Synch; Wolverine
#20	Magneto; Mystique; Professor X; Forge
#21	Cyclops; Emma Frost; Jean Grey; Magneto; Namor; Professor X

=== Appearing in Volume 6 (2021 series) ===
Issues	X-Men members	Other credited characters
# 1–3	Cyclops; Jean Grey; Polaris; Rogue; Sunfire; Synch; X-23 (Note: credited as Wolverine) (Note: Krakoan duplicate of X-23)	
# 4	Cyclops; Jean Grey; Sunfire; X-23	
#5	Cylops; Jean Grey; Polaris; Rogue; Sunfire; Synch; X-23	
#6	Cyclops (Note: also credited as Captain Krakoa); Sunfire; Synch	Feilong
#7	Cyclops; Jean Grey; Sunfire; Synch; X-23	Doctor Stasis (Note: credited as Dr. Stasis)
#8	Cyclops (Note: credited as Captain Krakoa); Jean Grey; Polaris; Rogue; Synch; X-23	
#9	Rogue; Sunfire	Destiny; Doctor Stasis; Gambit; Isca; MODOK; Nimrod; Professor X; Storm; Tarn the Uncaring
#10	Cyclops; Jean Grey; Rogue; Sunfire; Synch	Destiny; Gambit; Feilong
#11	Cyclops; Jean Grey; Rogue; Sunfire; Synch; X-23	Cordyceps Jones; Doctor Stasis
#12	Cyclops; Jean Grey; Polaris; Rogue; Sunfire; Synch; X-23	Cordyceps Jones; Doctor Stasis; Feilong; M.O.D.O.K.
#13	Cyclops; Jean Grey; Firestar; Forge; Havok; Iceman; Magik; Synch	Ikaris
#14-17, Annual #1	Cyclops; Jean Grey; Firestar; Forge; Havok; Iceman; Magik; Synch	
#18	Cyclops; Jean Grey; Firestar; Forge; Iceman; Magik; Synch; X-23	Dazzler; Jubilee; Tabitha Smith (Note: credited as Boom-Boom); X-23
#19	Cyclops; Jean Grey; Firestar; Forge; Iceman; Magik; Synch; X-23 (Note: credited as Talon)	Penance
#20-21	Cyclops; Jean Grey; Firestar; Forge; Iceman; Magik; Synch; X-23	Broo; Penance
#22	Cyclops; Firestar; Forge	Doctor Stasis; Karima Shapandar (Note: credited as Omega Sentinel); Nimrod; M.O.D.O.K.
#23	Cyclops; Jean Grey; Firestar; Forge; Iceman; Magik; Synch; X-23	Doctor Stasis; Mother Righteous
#24	Cyclops; Jean Grey; Firestar; Forge; Iceman; Magik; Synch; X-23	Destiny; Doctor Stasis; Cable (Note: credited as Kid Cable); Karima Shapandar; Nimrod; Moira MacTaggert (Note: credited as Moira X); Rogue
#25	Kamala Khan (Note: credited as Ms. Marvel); Kate Pryde; Rasputin IV; Synch; X-23	Cyclops; Firestar; Doctor Stasis
#26	Kamala Khan; Kate Pryde (Note: credited as Shadowkat)	Emma Frost (Note: also credited as Hazel Kendal); Feilong; Firestar; Kingpin; Iron Man (Note: credited as Tony Stark)
#27	Kamala Khan; Kate Pryde; Synch; X-23	Cyclops; Juggernaut
#28	Juggernaut; Kamala Khan; Kate Pryde; Rasputin IV; Synch; X-23	Cyclops; Firestar; Redroot; Sunfire
#29	Kamala Khan; Kate Pryde; Wolverine	Doctor Doom
#30	Kamala Khan; Synch; X-23	Cyclops; Doctor Stasis; Firestar; Norman Osborn (Note: credited as Gold Goblin); Iron Man; Jean Grey; Spider-Man
#31	Kamala Khan; Kate Pryde; Nightcrawler; Synch; Wolverine; X-23	Nimrod; Spider-Man
#32	—N/a	
#33	—N/a	
#34	—N/a	

== List of creators ==
Regular writers

- Victor Gischler (2010–2012)
- Chris Yost (2011)
- Brian Wood (2012)
- Seth Peck (2012–2013)
- Brian Wood (2013–2014)
- Marc Guggenheim (2014)
- G. Willow Wilson (2015)
- Jonathan Hickman (2019–2021)
- Gerry Duggan (2021–2024)
- Jed MacKay (2024–present)

Regular artists

- Paco Medina (2010–2011)
- Chris Bachalo (2011)
- Jorge Molina (2011)
- Will Conrad (2012)
- David López (2012)
- Paul Azeceta (2012–2013)
- Olivier Coipel (2013)
- David Lopez (2013)
- Terry Dodson (2013–2014)
- Harvey Tolibao (2014)
- Roland Boschi (2015)
- Leinil Yu (2019–2020)
- R.B. Silva (2020)
- Matteo Buffagni (2020)
- Mahmud Asrar (2020–2021)
- Phil Noto (2020)
- Brett Booth (2021)
- Francesco Mobili (2021)
- Nick Dragotta (2021)
- Russell Dauterman (2021)
- Lucas Werneck (2021)
- Sara Pichelli (2021)
- Pepe Larraz (2021–2022)
- Javier Pina (2021–2022)
- Joshua Cassara (2022–2024)
- C.F. Villa (2022–2024)
- Ryan Stegman (2024–present)

== Critical reception ==
=== Early volumes (2010–2015) ===
In May 2012, in a review of Gischler's final issue, Matthew Meylikhov of Multiversity commented that this volume was "less marketable" than the other X-Men titles, however, a "big part of the appeal of X-Men is really quite simple: screw it, let's just have some fun with it" and while it was sometimes "a bit too silly", it was "a comic that makes you smile". Meylikhov highlighted that "writer Victor Gischler used X-Men as less of a tool to appease to the litany of fans obsessed with Marvel continuity and has instead used it as an opportunity to accomplish the similar side-canon ideal formerly held by Astonishing X-Men. Unlike Astonishing, though, which focused on X-Men hanging out with X-Men, X-Men's basic goal was to insert the X-Men into the rest of the Marvel Universe. It had a wider scope in its vision, and every arc sought to raise the stakes and use a different enough cast to keep things fresh and lively without rocking any boats". Meylikhov felt that if a reader liked Gischler and "the idea of a story that you can read simply arc by arc, then X-Men works well" but if the reader wasn't looking for that, "the book could leave a lot to be desired, especially held to the quality of books like Uncanny X-Men and Wolverine and the X-Men". On the transition to Wood's run in June 2012, Meylikhov commented that "the adjectiveless title does inherently lose something by giving it such a sharper focus. The X-World did benefit by putting mutants out there a bit more and isolating them less, and taking that aspect away seems potentially detrimental. This isn't to doubt where Wood plans to take the book in the future, since it's not too evident at the moment, and yet with heavy exposition and the loss of little character moments that peppered Gischler's run, the book becomes less 'the fun X-Book' and leans more towards 'another X-Book'". When Multiversity named Wood writer of the month for September 2012, Walt Richardson commented that while "X-Men might not have been everything we hoped for, his other three books are doing just fine. [...] And even though X-Men is not particularly notable, it is hardly a bad comic". In a 2024 retrospective on the early 2010s X-Men comics, David Harth of CBR commented that the initial arc (Curse Of The Mutants) of volume 3 "is usually considered among the worst X-Men stories ever" and the volume "wasn't very popular as its opening story doomed the series". Harth highlighted that the other flagship titles post-Schism – Uncanny X-Men by writer Kieron Gillen and Wolverine and the X-Men by Jason Aaron – "sold very well and are still remembered fondly today, with X-Men (Vol. 3) falling further behind its fellows".

X-Men (vol 4.) was #45 on "CBR's Top 100 Comics of 2013" – Kelly Thompson of CBR opined that "while X-Men unfortunately (and unwisely) got pulled into a massive (and woefully unfulfilling) crossover early on in its run, the first arc of Brian Wood and Olivier Coipel's 'X-Men' was everything I have been wanting in a comic for nearly twenty years. [...] Wood is a character driven writer that knows how to protect characters while also growing them exponentially. He's also one of the best comic book writers when it comes to flawlessly blending the epic and the intimate – and there's no better book for the epic and the intimate crashing together so beautifully than an X-Men title". Casey Gilly, also for CBR, noted that despite Wood's "recent controversy", he "knows how to write female characters. His all-female X-Men team never felt like this pandering, desperate attempt to INCLUDE ALL GIRLS YAY CHEESECAKE, but instead felt thoughtful, powerful and right. He wrote heroes who just happened to be women, and who just happened to kick miles of ass".

In February 2014, Farid-ul-Haq of The Geekiary highlighted the first ten issues of X-Men (vol 4.) and stated that "you need to pick up the current X-Men series. I like the fact that the series isn't an excuse to give fans some monthly eye-candy and actually has a plot that affects the Marvel Universe. [...] The series shows the female cast in all its glory and kudos to Brian Wood, the writer. He has been careful when it comes to writing the characters as the strong women they are". However, by December 2014, his view had shifted – "the story started to feel like a mess as it went on. I didn't enjoy the rushed end to the Arkea arc and Storm's daughter, Kymera, showing up from the future really didn't add anything too exciting to Shogo's story". He also only enjoyed the first issue of Guggenheim's run as "the rest of the issues felt boring". In January 2015, ul-Haq praised Wilson's first issue, viewing it as "an amazing debut" and that "Wilson has indeed done a very impressive job her very first time writing for the X-Men title". In 2016, Elle Collins of ComicsAlliance commented that X-Men (vol 4.) "floundered between writer changes and crossovers before ending when Secret Wars came around in 2015. It was a great idea, though. There are so many female characters who are essential to the X-Men – Storm, Kitty Pryde, Rogue, Jubilee and so on – that putting a bunch them together in one book was a natural move. Unfortunately, since Secret Wars there's been no mention of a return to that concept".

=== Krakoan Age (2019–2024) ===
Rory Wilding, for AIPT in April 2020, reviewed the first six issues of Hickman's run on X-Men (Vol. 5) and highlighted that the "team roster changes" in each issue "which allows Hickman to show a variety of character dynamics. But if there is one character who is closest to being the main protagonist of the book, it would be Cyclops". Wilding felt that Hickman was able to balance the "seriousness" and "politics" with moments of "humor" and that while "there are some recurring threads throughout, each issue has its own identity, based on the sci-fi ideas Hickman wants to explore, some of which are heavy thinkers that set up big things in later issues". Wilding also highlighted the various artists on book – Leinil Francis Yu, with consistent work on the first four issues, who delivers "the big superhero/sci-fi spectacle, but does slightly struggle in the character domesticity" and R.B. Silva, on the fifth issue, "whose breathtaking visuals (colored by Marte Gracia) make me wish he drew more of the surroundings of Krakoa and Ecuador". However, Wilding thought the "standout" was the sixth issue "thanks to Matteo Buffagni's expressive artwork, how it ties into the events of House of X, and being a subtle character drama about one of the most iconic characters in X-Men lore". In November 2020, Vishal Gullapalli reviewed the next collection (issues #7–11) for AIPT and stated that it is "composed of mostly standalone stories with some connective tissue, although this one has a couple two-part stories". Gullapalli highlighted issue #7 as the standout and that it "was the source of some of the most spirited discussions and debates among the X-Fandom since House of X/Powers of X ended" since it "reveals the mechanism for controlled resurrections among mutants who lost their powers in the wake of House of M and want them back, and it's something that has become a really divisive issue in the community. Hickman does a fantastic job laying out both the proponents and opponents to this ritual, and really leaving it morality ambiguous". He also commented that "art-wise there isn't really anything stunning, but everyone does a good job executing what they're given".

In reviews of the final issue in July 2021, Jamie Lovett of ComicBook.com called the series "intense" and Dan Spinelli of AIPT called it an "outlier". Spinelli explained that most superhero story arcs are done in five to six issues while "Hickman made his series a de facto anthology, centered loosely around Cyclops and the Quiet Council of Krakoa. That atypical approach bore fruit in some surprising ways. [...] Hickman's X-Men series has been a reminder that delayed gratification often makes for the best stories". Lovett viewed issue #21 "like a coda" which "puts writer Jonathan Hickman's thoughts about the X-Men into more explicit focus. It's a story of dichotomies, where democracies and empires, dreams and realities sit side-by-side, making for an intriguing turning point in the larger mutant saga and a suitable punctuation mark that makes the often episodic series that preceded it more thematically coherent". In March 2022, Micheal Foulk of The Beat commented that Hickman's entire run "is non-linear and focuses on somewhat disconnected world-building vignettes set during the first few months after House of X. Following the timeline can be difficult but definitely not impossible" and that "Hickman is not one for holding the reader's hand through the big ideas, and he is a writer who deals in MASSIVE concepts. If it doesn't all make sense to you immediately, don't feel bad, I'm personally still connecting all the dots and I just reread all of it". Foulk opined that "Hickman's X-Men is expansive and almost overwhelming with all of its new ideas. I'm so excited to have this opportunity to reread these story arcs with a critical lens. This is an era that truly benefits from being read multiple times as each issue takes on new significance with more context".

Hickman's work on House of X (2019), Powers of X (2019), X-Men (Vol. 5), X-Men: Inferno (2022) was No. 2 on Nerdist's 2023 "The 10 Greatest X-Men Comic Book Runs of All Time, Rabked" list — Hickman "introduced new concepts and ideas to the Marvel mutant universe with practically every new issue. Because of this, the franchise became more exciting than it had been in years. Hickman worked with many artists during this time, primarily Pepe Larraz and Leinil Francis Yu, all of which elevated it to one of the best-looking X-Men runs, along with one of the most innovative and fresh. It might have only lasted three years, but Hickman's time on the X-Men franchise is one fans will still be talking about for decades to come". Hickman was nominated for the 2021 "Best Writer" Eisner Award for his work on X-Men (Vol. 5) along with his work on other series. Clayton Cowles was nominated for the 2022 "Best Lettering" Eisner Award for his work on both X-Men (Vol. 5) and X-Men (Vol. 6) along with his work on other series.

David Harth, for CBR in August 2023, highlighted that Hickman's volume 5 was the initial flagship title in the Krakoan Age where he "set down the building blocks that would flesh out" the era. However, when Hickman unexpectedly left, the series was rebooted as volume 6 with writer Gerry Duggan; while X-Men (Vol. 6) "sold well", the series felt "less important than when Hickman was writing" the previous volume. He viewed Pepe Larraz as "Marvel's heaviest-hitting penciler" but Gerry Duggan as a "steady hand" instead of a "superstar". Harth opined that the addition of Immortal X-Men by Kieron Gillen and X-Men Red by Al Ewing led to X-Men falling "further in readers' esteem" as "many fans" assumed the new titles "were the important books" because they had the more "A-list writers" even though all three titles had comparable art teams – "Immortal and Red gave readers more of the high-concept plots they were expecting and those books soon became the ones that most people thought of as flagships. X-Men (Vol. 6) was a fun superhero book, but it wasn't the center of the Krakoa Era anymore". However, Harth thought Dungan had the tools to "shine" in the upcoming Fall of X as a superhero story was what was needed which "should let X-Men (Vol. 6) retake its spot at the top". Then in March 2024, in overview of Fall of X for CBR, Harth commented the volume "hasn't exactly set the world on fire, besides its A-list art. Its simplistic plots, lackluster character development, and basic sense of humor hasn't worked for every X-Men fan, but issue 29 was the most entertaining issue in a long time" by including Doctor Doom. In contrast, Alexander Jones for Multiversity viewed the series' "unique tone" as a core aspect "that makes this modern run on X-Men great" – "Gerry Duggan writes relatable dialogue for his X-Men characters and has a knack for pairing them off in really strange scenarios. One of the other fantastic aspects about this run are the talented artists who have contributed to this series including Stefano Casselli, Pepe Larraz and Joshua Cassara" with Cassara's artwork showing improvement over the course of the series. Jones highlighted how this series has seeded multiple Krakoan Age events and "switched directions a number of times": it "established fascinating plot threads for Judgment Day with Ben Urich's involvement in the narrative", "carried a focus on Sins of Sinister with Dr. Stasis", and foreshadowed "the Fall of X heavily thanks to the influence of Orchis".

Ryan Sonneville, in his review of X-Men (Vol. 6) #19-24 for AIPT, commented that "overall, Gerry Duggan does a fine job getting all these characters to where they need to be prior to the Fall of X event, and their interpersonal interactions and action scenes are satisfying" and that "Stefano Caselli and Joshua Cassara deserve equal praise for the line work they do in this book". Sonneville opined that as the series approaches Fall of X it felt "like the X-Office didn't know what else to say about Krakoa"; however, "even when it feels like it is stalling, Duggan's X-Men was gratifying with plenty for fans to appreciate and enjoy". Sonneville, in his review of X-Men (Vol. 6) #25-29 for AIPT, commented that "Duggan has always excelled at being able to tell personal character stories that deliver those fan-favorite moments of comic book action and comradery. His X-Men run seemed to be a direct response to world-building focused storytelling of his predecessor, and these issues continue to add that same charm". Sonneville also highlighted the while there are multiple artist changes from issue to issue, "each issues looks great, while still feeling consistent with Duggan's script and the overall look for the title". Sonneville noted that he would miss Duggan's work when the series was rebooted after Fall of X – these issues "capture a love and interconnectedness between the cast that effortlessly weaves the larger line-wide plot into each issue. This isn't just a book to read to get caught up, but to celebrate the artistic power the X-Men continues to emanate into the comic community". X-Men (Vol. 6) was nominated for IGN's 2023 Best Comic Book Series or Original Graphic Novel — Jesse Schedeen commented that while Immortal X-Men won the award in 2022, "it was the flagship X-Men title that stood out the most" in 2023. Schedeen highlighted that following the Hellfire Gala (2023), the "new status quo has been explored brilliantly by writer Gerry Duggan and his artistic partners, with the series taking on a darker and more urgent edge in recent months" in the Fall of X phase. Austin Gorton of ComicsXF focused on the art of Krakoa from X-Men (vol. 6) #35 – "there's just something about the final image of Krakoa saying goodbye to the mutants staying behind on Earth to be churned up into the latest relaunch that I find achingly beautiful. There are few words on the page, yet it seems to say so much. It haunts me (in a good way)".

==== Print sales (2019–2021) ====
Issue	Publication date	Comic Book Roundup rating	Estimated sales to North American retailers (first month)	Notes
Volume 5 (2019 series)
#1	October 16, 2019	8.6 by 25 professional critics	255,724	None
#2	November 13, 2019	8.3 by 18 professional critics	117,538	None
#3	December 4, 2019	8.4 by 18 professional critics	105,708	None
#4	January 1, 2020	8.8 by 13 professional critics	93,342	None
#5	January 29, 2020	8.4 by 16 professional critics	80,443	None
#6	February 12, 2020	8.9 by 16 professional critics	92,287	None
#7	February 26, 2020	9.2 by 14 professional critics	76,691	None
#8	March 11, 2020	8.5 by 13 professional critics	75,080	None
#9	March 26, 2020	8.0 by 16 professional critics	70,208	None
#10	July 29, 2020	7.7 by 12 professional critics	Data not yet available	Empyre tie-in
#11	August 26, 2020	8.3 by 11 professional critics	Data not yet available	Empyre tie-in
#12	September 16, 2020	8.2 by 10 professional critics	Data not yet available	None
#13	October 21, 2020	7.8 by 12 professional critics	Data not yet available	X of Swords tie-in
#14	November 4, 2020	7.5 by 9 professional critics	Data not yet available	X of Swords tie-in
#15	November 25, 2020	8.2 by 11 professional critics	Data not yet available	X of Swords tie-in
#16	December 30, 2020	7.7 by 15 professional critics	Data not yet available	None
#17	January 27, 2021	7.6 by 13 professional critics	Data not yet available	None
#18	February 24, 2021	7.8 by 18 professional critics	Data not yet available	None
#19	March 31, 2021	9.0 by 13 professional critics	Data not yet available	None
#20	May 26, 2021	8.7 by 12 professional critics	Data not yet available	None
#21	June 9, 2021	8.0 by 13 professional critics	Data not yet available	Hellfire Gala tie-in

=== Relaunch (2024–present) ===
In 2024, X-Men Senior Editor Tom Brevoort revealed plans for 2025 including a storyline for March, a special project for May, a key one-shot for June, and a big X-line event in the fall.

Michael Guerrero, reviewing X-Men #1 (Vol. 7) for AIPT, viewed the opening issue as a "strong relaunch" which introduces a new X-Men era to readers and even though "it may be a bit familiar, I believe it does a great job of leaping over one of the hardest hurdles for the title: following up on the aftermath of the fall of Krakoa. [...] While nothing can last forever, including the prior era of the X-Men, it seems that this series is going to take the importance of Krakoa and what it stood for to use as a moral compass to guide the team to protect mutants from experiencing loss on that level again". Guerrero also highlighted the main cast of characters and thought MacKay delivered "an immediately lovable roster" – "while Scott is as cool and collected as ever, others like Magik and Juggernaut or Kid Omega and Temper have an enjoyable dynamic that adds some comedic relief to the series, while others such as Beast and Magneto provide sharp versatility to the team". In contrast, Jamie Lovett of ComicBook.com thought the first issue lacked "a strong hook" as "characters under familiar circumstances" were not enough to make a statement. Lovett commented that "with Cyclops leading a borderline paramilitary team of mutant heavy hitters with little regard for human rules, it has more in common with the Uncanny X-Men run that followed the events of Avengers vs. X-Men in the 2010s—much of the roster is the even same—but less bold. That may be down to MacKay's writing of Cyclops, who comes off as less revolutionary and more tired and embittered than the last time he played this role".

According to CBR, Marvel now publishes over a dozen X-titles each month.

In 2025, at the Marvel X-Men panel at New York Comic Con, a new series was announced launching out of the X-Men Age of Revelation called Magik & Colossus from the creative team of Ashley Allen and German Peralta.

== Collected editions ==
=== Volume 3 (2010 series) ===
Title	Material collected	Publication date	ISBN
X-Men: Curse of the Mutants	X-Men (vol. 3) #1–6	March 2, 2011	Hardcover: 978-0785148463 Paperback: 978-0785148470
X-Men: With Great Power	X-Men (vol. 3) #7–11; Marvel Team-Up Annual #1	July 6, 2011	Hardcover: 978-0785148487 Paperback: 978-0785148494
X-Men: First to Last	X-Men: Giant-Size #1; X-Men (vol. 3) #12–15	November 9, 2011	Hardcover: 978-0785152873 Paperback: 978-0785152880
X-Men: FF	X-Men (vol. 3) #15.1, 16–19	March 7, 2012	Hardcover: 978-0785160694 Paperback: 978-0785160700
X-Men: War Machines	X-Men (vol. 3) #20-23; Uncanny X-Men (vol. 2) #14	May 9, 2012	Hardcover: 978-0785161875 Paperback: 978-0785161882
X-Men: The Curse is Broken	X-Men (vol. 3) #24-29	November 28, 2012	Paperback: 978-0785161899
X-Men by Brian Wood Vol. 1: Blank Generation	X-Men (vol. 3) #30-33	February 12, 2013	Paperback: 978-0785164593
X-Men by Brian Wood Vol. 2: Reckless Abandonment	X-Men (vol. 3) #34-41	April 30, 2013	Paperback: 978-0785164616

=== Volume 4 (2013 series) ===
Title	Material collected	Publication date	ISBN
X-Men Volume 1: Primer	X-Men (vol. 4) #1-4; Uncanny X-Men #244	December 10, 2013	Paperback: 978-0785168003
X-Men: Battle of the Atom	X-Men: Battle of the Atom #1-2; All-New X-Men #16–17; X-Men (vol. 4) #5-6; Uncanny X-Men (vol. 3) #12-13; Wolverine and the X-Men #36-37	January 21, 2014	Hardcover: 978-0785189060 Paperback: 978-1846535727
X-Men Volume 2: Muertas	X-Men (vol. 4) #7-12	May 20, 2014	Paperback: 978-0785168010
X-Men Volume 3: Bloodline	X-Men (vol. 4) #13-17	October 21, 2014	Paperback: 978-0785189725
X-Men Volume 4: Exogenous	X-Men (vol. 4) #18-22	March 3, 2015	Paperback: 978-0785192336
X-Men Volume 5: The Burning World	X-Men (vol. 4) #23-26	July 28, 2015	Paperback: 978-0785197263

=== Volume 5 (2019 series) ===
Title	Material collected	Format	Publication date	ISBN
X-Men by Jonathan Hickman – Volume 1	X-Men (vol. 5) #1–6	Trade paperback	April 21, 2020	ISBN 978-1302919818
X-Men by Jonathan Hickman – Volume 2	X-Men (vol. 5) #7–12	Trade paperback	November 17, 2020	ISBN 978-1302919825
X-Men by Jonathan Hickman – Volume 3	X-Men (vol. 5) #16–20	Trade paperback	July 20, 2021	ISBN 978-1302924911
X-Men by Jonathan Hickman Omnibus (Leinil Francis Yu cover)	X-Men (vol. 5) #1–11 and #16–21; Giant-Size X-Men: Jean Grey and Emma Frost, Nightcrawler, Magneto, Fantomex, Storm; material from Incoming! #1	Hardcover	March 29, 2022	ISBN 978-1-302-92998-5
X-Men by Jonathan Hickman Omnibus (Russell Dauterman cover)	X-Men (vol. 5) #1–11 and #16–21; Giant-Size X-Men: Jean Grey and Emma Frost, Nightcrawler, Magneto, Fantomex, Storm; material from Incoming! #1	Hardcover	March 30, 2022	ISBN 978-1-302-93208-4

=== Volume 6 (2021) ===
Title	Material collected	Format	Publication date	ISBN
X-Men by Gerry Duggan – Volume 1	X-Men (vol. 6) #1–6	Trade paperback	March 1, 2022	ISBN 978-1302927233
X-Men by Gerry Duggan – Volume 2	X-Men (vol. 6) #7–12	Trade paperback	September 22, 2022	ISBN 978-1302927240
X-Men by Gerry Duggan – Volume 3	X-Men (vol. 6) #13–18, Annual #1	Trade paperback	February 28, 2023	ISBN 978-1302932503
X-Men by Gerry Duggan – Volume 4	X-Men (vol. 6) #19–24	Trade paperback	October 3, 2023	ISBN 978-1302947538
X-Men by Gerry Duggan – Volume 5	X-Men (vol. 6) #25–29	Trade paperback	March 5, 2024	ISBN 978-1302947545
X-Men by Gerry Duggan – Volume 6	X-Men (vol. 6) #30–34	Trade paperback	September 3, 2024	ISBN 9781302957216
