= Joshua Cassara =

American comic book artist (1980–2026)

- Born: 1980
- Died: September 22, 2026 (aged 46)
- Area: Comic book artist
- Spouse: Martha Cassara

Joshua Cassara (1980 – September 22, 2026) was an American comic book artist.

== Early life and career ==
Cassara was born in 1980. He played high school football and volleyball at La Mirada High School, and graduated in 1998. He began his career in 2015, where he drew for the Titan Publishing Group comic book The Troop, and in 2016, he drew for the comic book Mycroft Holmes and the Apocalypse Handbook. In the same year, he joined Marvel Comics, and drew the seventh issue of the New Avengers, written by Al Ewing.

Later in his career, in 2017, Cassara penciled the comic book series Falcon, written by Rodney Barnes. He drew and illustrated on numerous comics such as Mycroft Holmes, Sentry, Secret Empire, The Avengers, X-Men, X-Force, Hellfire Gala and Venom. In 2020, he was named to Marvel Comics talent distinction program, and in 2023, he drew the covers for the comic book series Planet of the Apes.

== Personal life and death ==
Cassara was married to Martha until his death. He died from heart complications on September 22, 2026, at the age of 46.
