= Jed MacKay =

Canadian comic book writer

- Born: Jed MacKay Stanley Bridge, Prince Edward Island, Canada
- Area: Writer
- Notable works: Black Cat, Taskmaster, Moon Knight, The Death of Doctor Strange, Avengers, X-Men

Jed MacKay is a Canadian comics writer mainly known for his work at Marvel Comics, writing characters such as the Black Cat, Moon Knight, and Doctor Strange.

== Career ==
Jed MacKay's first professional comic was an eight-page story in 2011's X-Men: To Serve and Protect #4. Four years later, he was invited to do another eight-page story in 2015's Spider-Verse #2 and then another story in 2018's Edge of Spider-Geddon #1. After that, he began getting steady work, writing a five-issue Man Without Fear mini-series and a Marvel Digital Original for the Daughters of the Dragon.

In 2019, he was announced as the writer for the first Black Cat ongoing series, with artwork by Travel Foreman. "We're meeting Felicia fresh as she gets drawn into a big and daring new scheme, but we're also digging into some unknown history—who put her on the thief's life, the connection between the Hardy family and the Drake clan, and how that past will tumble into Felicia's future." In August 2020, it was announced that the book was going on hiatus after issue 12, but it was then subsequently relaunched as part of a tie in to Marvel's "King in Black" crossover. This book came to an end after ten issues, but MacKay continued writing the character of Black Cat in a one-shot called Mary Jane & Black Cat: Beyond that then became a mini-series spinning out of the Spider-Man/X-Men "Dark Web" crossover. In 2022, MacKay also wrote a mini-series teaming up Black Cat and Iron Man titled Iron Cat.

In April 2021, MacKay and artist Alessandro Cappucio were announced as the new creative team for a relaunched Moon Knight book spinning out of Jason Aaron's Avengers "Age of Khonshu" arc. The book went on for thirty issues before ending in the death of Moon Knight. The book was then relaunched as Vengeance of the Moon Knight, with MacKay returning to the same characters, but with a mysterious new character posing as Moon Knight. In 2024, after the MacKay-written event Blood Hunt, the book was again relaunched as Moon Knight: Fist of Khonshu, with a newly resurrected Moon Knight.

In September 2021, MacKay and artist Lee Garbett were announced as the creative team for The Death of Doctor Strange. This event then led into the ten-issue Strange, about Clea Strange taking over the mantle of Sorcerer Supreme. The book was then relaunched in 2023 with artist Pasqual Ferry as Doctor Strange, with a resurrected Strange and Clea as leads. Also in 2023, MacKay and artist C.F. Villa were announced as the creative team for the new Avengers relaunch. MacKay was then the main writer and architect of the 2024 summer crossover, Blood Hunt, with artist Pepe Larraz. Blood Hunt would get "extra gory" Red Band editions available only in comic shops. The end of Blood Hunt also saw the end of MacKay's Doctor Strange, as the title came to an end with 18 issues.

In 2021, MacKay was announced as the initial writer for Boom!'s new Magic comic, based on the Magic: The Gathering TCG.

In 2024, MacKay and artist Ryan Stegman were announced as the new creative team for X-Men, one of the main books of the X-Men: From the Ashes relaunch. This will make MacKay the first person to write both the main Avengers and X-Men titles since Roy Thomas.

== Personal life ==
MacKay is a former junior high school teacher who grew up in Stanley Bridge, P.E.I., and now lives in Halifax, Nova Scotia.

== Bibliography ==
=== Marvel comics ===
- Absolute Carnage: Weapon Plus #1
- Alpha Flight: True North #1, short story "Monsters" (2019)
- Avengers
  - Avengers Mech Strike #1-5 (2021)
  - Avengers vol 8 #45, backup story "Moon Knight" (2021)
  - Avengers vol 9 #1-36 (2023–2026)
- Bizarre Adventures vol 2 #1, short story "The Star-Spawned Sorcerer" (2019)
- Black Cat
  - Black Cat #1-12, Annual (2019–2020)
  - Black Cat vol 2 #1-10, Annual (2020–2021)
  - Giant-Size Black Cat: Infinity Score #1 (2021)
  - Mary Jane & Black Cat: Beyond #1
  - Iron Cat #1-5 (2022)
  - Mary Jane & Black Cat #1-5 (2022–2023)
- Blood Hunt #1-5 (2024)
- Daughters of the Dragon - Marvel Digital Original #1-3 (2018–2019)
- Doctor Strange
  - Death of Doctor Strange #1-5 (2021–2022)
  - Strange vol 3 #1-10 (2022–2023)
  - Doctor Strange vol 6 #1-18 (2023–2024)
- Free Comic Book Day 2020: Spider-Man/Venom #1 (2020)
- Free Comic Book Day 2024: Blood Hunt/X-Men #1
- Extreme Venomverse #3, short story "Greatness and Catastrophe" (2023)
- Infinity Wars: Ghost Panther #1-2 (2018)
- Infinite Destinies
  - Iron Man Annual vol 3 #1 (2021)
  - Captain America Annual vol 3 #1, backup story (2021)
  - Black Cat Annual vol 2 #1 (2021)
  - Amazing Spider-Man Annual vol 4 #2, backup story (2021)
  - Thor Annual vol 5 #1, backup story (2021)
  - Guardians of the Galaxy vol 5 #1, backup story (2021)
  - Miles Morales: Spider-Man Annual #1 (2021)
  - Avengers Annual vol 4 #1 (2021)
- Man Without Fear #1-5 (2018–2019)
- Moon Knight
  - Moon Knight vol 9 #1-30, Annual (2021–2023)
  - Devil's Reign: Moon Knight #1 (2022)
  - Vengeance of the Moon Knight vol 2 #1-9 (2024)
  - Moon Knight: Fist of Khonshu #0-15 (2024–2025)
  - Phases of the Moon Knight #2, short story "Knight Time in the City" (2024)
  - Marc Spector: Moon Knight vol 2 #1-ongoing (2026–present)
- Spider-Verse
  - Spider-Verse #2, short story "With Great Power Comes No Future" (2015)
  - Edge of Spider-Geddon #1 (2018)
  - Spider-Geddon #0, short story "Check In" (2018)
  - Superior Octopus #1 (2018)
  - Vault of Spiders #1-2, stories "Prologue" and "Final Galaxy Battle!" (2018)
  - Spider-Verse vol 3 #1, 3, 6 (2019–2020)
  - King in Black: Spider-Man #1
  - Amazing Spider-Man vol 5 #78.BEY (2021), #87, #92, #92.BEY (2022)
  - Death of Doctor Strange: Spider-Man #1 (2021)
- Taskmaster vol 3 #1-5 (2021)
- Timeless vol 1 #1 (2021) and vol 2 #1 (2022)
- X-Men
  - X-Men: To Serve and Protect #4, short story "Disco Highway" (2011)
  - Wolverine: Black, White, & Blood #3, short story "Red Planet Blues" (2021)
  - X-Men vol 6 #35, short story "From the Ashes" (2024)
  - X-Men vol 7 #1-ongoing (2024–present)

=== Other companies ===
==== Boom! Studios ====
- Magic #1-25 (2021–2023)
