= Fresh Start (comics) =

2018 relaunch of comic book publications by Marvel Comics

- Teaser poster for the "A Fresh Start" relaunch. Art by Jim Cheung depicting Spider-Man, Wolverine, the Thing, Captain America, Black Panther, the Punisher, She-Hulk, Ant-Man and the Wasp, Ghost Rider (Robbie Reyes), Iron Man, Thor, Luke Cage, Jessica Jones, Daredevil, Hulk, Jean Grey, Captain Marvel, Venom, Doctor Strange, Gambit, Deadpool, Ms. Marvel and Miles Morales
- Publisher: Marvel Comics
- Publication date: May 2018 – Present
- Genre: Superhero
- Main character: Marvel Universe

Creative team
- Writer: Various
- Artist: Various

Fresh Start is a 2018 relaunch of comic book publications by Marvel Comics, following Marvel Legacy.

== Changes to the Marvel Universe ==
The relaunch saw the return of Tony Stark, Steve Rogers, Logan, Odinson and Bruce Banner to their classic identities of Iron Man, Captain America, Wolverine, Thor and Hulk respectively after all these characters had been replaced by legacy heroes in recent times. For example, Tony Stark ended up in a coma in Civil War II, and his armor was donned by both reborn-villain Doctor Doom in Infamous Iron Man and fifteen-year-old genius Riri Williams (who took on the codename Ironheart) in Invincible Iron Man; Sam Wilson, a longtime ally of Captain America as Falcon, had taken the mantle in All-New Captain America; Laura Kinney, the female clone of Logan who is also viewed as Logan's daughter, became the Wolverine in All-New Wolverine; Jane Foster, a longtime love interest of Thor, became 'Mighty Thor' in Thor vol. 4; Bruce Banner died in Civil War II, with Amadeus Cho becoming the 'Totally Awesome Hulk'.

The relaunch also saw the return of Marvel's first family, the Fantastic Four, which had broken up following the conclusion of the 2015 Secret Wars storyline. The relaunch marked Peter Parker and Mary Jane Watson resuming their relationship for the first time since their marriage was retconned out of existence in the "One More Day" storyline. The Fresh Start initiative also includes a new incarnation of the West Coast Avengers, consisting of Hawkeye, Kate Bishop, Gwenpool, America Chavez, Quentin Quire, and Kate's boyfriend Johnny. The teaser poster featured Jessica Jones and Miles Morales, characters created by Brian Michael Bendis. Bendis had recently moved to DC Comics; the poster was seen as confirmation that Marvel would keep publishing those characters.

On April 18, 2018, a sampler collection – Marvel Universe Magazine – was published, similar to Marvel Legacy #1 from the previous year. It included previews from several forthcoming new #1 issues. Many writers have been assigned with new titles; The Amazing Spider-Man's Dan Slott, Deadpool's Gerry Duggan and The Avengers' Mark Waid and others left their title due to the Fresh Start relaunch. The X-Men line was relaunched with six new titles as part of the Dawn of X relaunch in 2019. The time-displaced original X-Men who were brought into the present day during Bendis' run on the 2012 All-New X-Men series before starring in their own X-Men Blue title, were returned to the past during the Extermination miniseries.

== Criticism ==
David Barnett, from The Guardian in February 2018, pointed out that most of the characters involved have appeared in recent films or TV series, or are about to do so, and criticized that effort to emulate the feel of those productions instead of taking full advantage of the capabilities of the comic book medium to produce fantasy and sci-fi without the constraints of special effects budgets. He also considered that Marvel may be stepping back from its attempts to make comics featuring diverse female, black, Asian and LGBT characters, trying instead to appeal to its most conservative readership. Graeme McMillan, from The Hollywood Reporter in February 2018, pointed out that Marvel has been announcing wide relaunches annually since 2012, but have provided limited changes.

Dave Buesing, for Popverse in July 2022, commented on the longevity of the Fresh Start era – at four years old it is "the longest-running Marvel era of this time period". Buesing highlighted Google search analytics, with the caveat that "these metrics are not reflections of quality or sales", where "the peak of Marvel's 'Fresh Start' is 3.5x less searched than the previous year's 'Marvel Legacy' peaks" and that "searchers in 2022 are [...] 2-3x more likely to be looking for 'Marvel NOW!' than Marvel 'Fresh Start'". Buesing wrote that "when you look at the long reach of Google to represent one aspect of human curiosity, comic fans are simply not connecting with these initiatives anywhere near the degree they did at the start of the '10s". Buesing anticipated that the Fresh Start era would come to an end soon. As of 2025, this speculation has yet to come to fruition.

== Titles ==
=== Ongoing series ===
Title	Issues	Writer	Artist	Debut Date	Conclusion Date
Avengers (vol. 8)	#1–66	Jason Aaron	Ed McGuinness	May 2, 2018	March 8, 2023
Venom (vol. 4)	#1–35; Annual #1	Donny Cates	Ryan Stegman	May 9, 2018	June 16, 2021
Black Panther (vol. 7)	#1–25	Ta-Nehisi Coates	Daniel Acuña	May 23, 2018	May 26, 2021
Deadpool (vol. 7)	#1–15	Skottie Young	Nic Klein	June 6, 2018	July 17, 2019
Doctor Strange (vol. 5)	#1–20; Annual #1	Mark Waid	Jesus Saiz	June 6, 2018	October 2, 2019
Immortal Hulk	#0–50	Al Ewing	Joe Bennett	June 6, 2018	October 13, 2021
Thor (vol. 5)	#1–16	Jason Aaron	Mike del Mundo	June 13, 2018	August 28, 2019
Tony Stark: Iron Man	#1–19	Dan Slott	Valerio Schiti	June 20, 2018	December 18, 2019
Sentry (vol. 3)	#1–5	Jeff Lemire	Kim Jacinto	June 27, 2018	October 24, 2018
Captain America (vol. 9)	#1–30; Annual #1	Ta-Nehisi Coates	Leinil Francis Yu	July 4, 2018	July 7, 2021
The Amazing Spider-Man (vol. 5)	#1–93; Annual #1	Various		July 11, 2018	March 30, 2022
X-23 (vol. 4)	#1–12	Mariko Tamaki	Juan Cabal	July 11, 2018	May 29, 2019
Mr. & Mrs. X	#1–12	Kelly Thompson	Oscar Bazaldua	July 25, 2018	June 26, 2019
Fantastic Four (vol. 6)	#1–48	Dan Slott	Sara Pichelli	August 8, 2018	October 12, 2022
The Punisher (vol. 12)	#1–16	Matthew Rosenberg	Riccardo Burchielli	August 22, 2018	October 2, 2019
West Coast Avengers (vol. 3)	#1–10	Kelly Thompson	Stefano Caselli	August 22, 2018	April 17, 2019
Asgardians of the Galaxy	#1–10	Cullen Bunn	Matteo Lolli	September 5, 2018	June 12, 2019
The Unstoppable Wasp (vol. 2)	#1–10	Jeremy Whitley	Gurihiru	October 17, 2018	July 17, 2019
Shuri	#1–10	Nnedi Okorafor	Leonardo Romero	October 17, 2018	July 24, 2019
Spider-Gwen: Ghost Spider	#1–10	Seanan McGuire	Rosi Kampe	October 24, 2018	July 3, 2019
Uncanny X-Men (vol. 5)	#1–22; Annual #1	Ed Brisson, Kelly Thompson & Matthew Rosenberg	Mahmud A. Asrar, R.B. Silva, Yildiray Cinar & Pere Pérez	November 14, 2018	July 17, 2019
Ironheart	#1–12	Eve Ewing	Kevin Libranda	November 28, 2018	November 27, 2019
Miles Morales: Spider-Man	#1–42	Saladin Ahmed	Javier Garron	December 12, 2018	September 28, 2022
The Superior Spider-Man (vol. 2)	#1–12	Christos Gage	Mike Hawthorne	December 26, 2018	October 30, 2019
X-Force (vol. 5)	#1–10	Ed Brisson	Dylan Burnett	December 26, 2018	July 17, 2019
Champions (vol. 3)	#1–10	Jim Zub	Steven Cummings	January 2, 2019	October 2, 2019
Captain Marvel (vol. 10)	#1–50	Kelly Thompson	Carmen Carnero	January 9, 2019	June 14, 2023
Friendly Neighborhood Spider-Man (vol. 2)	#1–14	Tom Taylor	Juan Cabal	January 9, 2019	December 11, 2019
Invaders (vol. 3)	#1–12	Chip Zdarsky	Carlos Magno, Butch Guice, Rafael Alburquerque	January 16, 2019	December 18, 2019
Marvel Comics Presents (vol. 3)	#1–9	Charles Soule, Greg Pak & Ann Nocenti	Tomm Coker & Paulo Siqueira	January 16, 2019	September 25, 2019
Guardians of the Galaxy (vol. 5)	#1–12; Annual #1	Donny Cates	Geoff Shaw	January 23, 2019	December 18, 2019
Daredevil (vol. 6)	#1–36; Annual #1	Chip Zdarsky	Marco Checchetto	February 6, 2019	December 1, 2021
Magnificent Ms. Marvel	#1–18	Saladin Ahmed	Minkyu Jung	March 13, 2019	February 24, 2021
Marvel Team-Up (vol. 4)	#1–6	Eve Ewing	Joey Vazquez	April 3, 2019	September 25, 2019
Savage Avengers	#1–28; Annual #1	Gerry Duggan	Mike Deodato, Jr.	May 1, 2019	January 12, 2022
Black Cat (vol. 1)	#1–12; Annual #1	Jed MacKay	Travel Foreman	June 5, 2019	August 5, 2020
Aero	#1–12	Zhou Liefen & Greg Pak	Keng & Pop Mhan	July 3, 2019	October 21, 2020
Loki (vol. 3)	#1–5	Daniel Kibblesmith	Oscar Bazaldua	July 17, 2019	November 20, 2019
Sword Master	#1–12	Shuizhu & Greg Pak	Gunji & Ario Anindito	July 24, 2019	November 18, 2020
Valkyrie: Jane Foster	#1–10	Jason Aaron & Al Ewing	CAFU	July 24, 2019	August 19, 2020
Ghost-Spider	#1–10	Seanan McGuire	Takeshi Miyazawa	August 7, 2019	August 26, 2020
Future Foundation	#1–5	Jeremy Whitley	Will Robson	August 7, 2019	December 18, 2019
Black Panther and the Agents of Wakanda	#1–8	Jim Zub	Lan Medina	September 18, 2019	July 8, 2020
Strikeforce	#1–9	Tini Howard	German Peralta	September 25, 2019	August 5, 2020
Ghost Rider (vol. 9)	#1–7	Ed Brisson	Aaron Kuder	October 2, 2019	July 8, 2020
Doctor Doom	#1–10	Christopher Cantwell	Salvador Larroca	October 9, 2019	December 23, 2020
X-Men (vol. 5)	#1–21	Jonathan Hickman	Leinil Francis Yu	October 16, 2019	June 9, 2021
The Amazing Mary Jane	#1–6	Leah Williams	Carlos E. Gomez	October 23, 2019	March 18, 2020
Marauders (vol. 1)	#1–27; Annual #1	Gerry Duggan	Matteo Lolli	October 23, 2019	January 12, 2022
Excalibur (vol. 4)	#1–26	Tini Howard	Marcus To	October 30, 2019	December 15, 2021
New Mutants (vol. 4)	#1–33	Jonathan Hickman, Ed Brisson & Vita Ayala	Rod Reis	November 6, 2019	December 28, 2022
X-Force (vol. 6)	#1–50; Annual #1	Benjamin Percy	Joshua Cassara	November 6, 2019	March 27, 2024
Fallen Angels (vol. 2)	#1–6	Bryan Edward Hill	Szymon Kudranski	November 13, 2019	January 29, 2020
Morbius	#1–5	Vita Ayala	Marcelo Ferreira	November 13, 2019	March 18, 2020
Deadpool (vol. 8)	#1–10	Kelly Thompson	Chris Bachalo	November 20, 2019	January 27, 2021
Scream: Curse of Carnage	#1–6	Clay McLeod Chapman	Chris Mooneyham	November 27, 2019	June 3, 2020
Dr. Strange	#1–6	Mark Waid	Kev Walker	December 25, 2019	August 5, 2020
Thor (vol. 6)	#1–35; Annual #1	Donny Cates & Torunn Gronbekk	Nic Klein	January 1, 2020	June 28, 2023
Guardians of the Galaxy (vol. 6)	#1–18	Al Ewing	Juan Cabal	January 22, 2020	September 22, 2021
Wolverine (vol. 7)	#1–50	Benjamin Percy	Adam Kubert & Viktor Bogdanovic	February 19, 2020	May 22, 2024
Strange Academy	#1–18	Skottie Young	Humberto Ramos	March 3, 2020	July 6, 2022
Cable (vol. 4)	#1–12	Gerry Duggan	Phil Noto	March 11, 2020	July 28, 2021
Spider-Woman (vol. 7)	#1–21	Karla Pacheco	Pere Perez	March 18, 2020	March 30, 2022
Hellions	#1–18	Zeb Wells	Stephen Segovia	March 25, 2020	December 8, 2021
X-Factor (vol. 4)	#1–10	Leah Williams	David Baldeón	July 29, 2020	June 30, 2021
Black Widow (vol. 8)	#1–15	Kelly Thompson	Elena Casagrande	September 2, 2020	April 6, 2022
Iron Man (vol. 6)	#1–25	Christopher Cantwell	CAFU	September 16, 2020	November 16, 2022
Champions (vol. 4)	#1–10	Eve L. Ewing & Danny Lore	Simone Di Meo, Bob Quinn & Luciano Vecchio	October 7, 2020	October 6, 2021
S.W.O.R.D. (vol. 2)	#1–11	Al Ewing	Valerio Schiti	December 9, 2020	December 22, 2021
Black Cat (vol. 2)	#1–10	Jed MacKay	C.F. Villa	December 16, 2020	September 29, 2021
Eternals (vol. 5)	#1–12	Kieron Gillen	Esad Ribić	January 6, 2021	May 18, 2022
X-Men Legends (vol. 1)	#1–12	Various		February 17, 2021	March 9, 2022
Children of the Atom	#1–6	Vita Ayala	Bernard Chang	March 10, 2021	August 11, 2021
Non-Stop Spider-Man	#1–5	Joe Kelly	Chris Bachalo	March 10, 2021	September 29, 2021
Way of X	#1–5	Si Spurrier	Bob Quinn	April 21, 2021	August 18, 2021
The Marvels	#1–12	Kurt Busiek	Yıldıray Çınar	April 28, 2021	July 20, 2022
X-Corp	#1–5	Tini Howard	Alberto Foche	May 12, 2021	September 22, 2021
Shang-Chi (vol. 2)	#1–12	Gene Luen Yang	Dike Ruan	May 19, 2021	May 11, 2022
X-Men (vol. 6)	#1–35; Annual #1	Gerry Duggan	Pepe Larraz	July 7, 2021	June 5, 2024
Moon Knight (vol. 9)	#1–30; Annual #1	Jed MacKay	Alessandro Cappuccio	July 21, 2021	December 13, 2023
Venom (vol. 5)	#1–39	Al Ewing, Ram V & Torunn Gronbekk	Bryan Hitch	November 10, 2021	November 13, 2024
Hulk (vol. 5)	#1–14	Donny Cates & Ryan Ottley	Ryan Ottley	November 24, 2021	April 26, 2023
Black Panther (vol. 8)	#1–15	John Ridley	Juan Cabal	November 24, 2021	March 8, 2023
She-Hulk (vol. 4)	#1–15	Rainbow Rowell	Rogê Antônio	January 19, 2022	July 26, 2023
Ghost Rider (vol. 10)	#1–21	Benjamin Percy	Cory Smith	February 9, 2022	December 27, 2023
Strange (vol. 3)	#1–10	Jed MacKay	Marcelo Ferreira	March 2, 2022	January 18, 2023
Carnage (vol. 3)	#1–14	Ram V	Francesco Manna	March 16, 2022	June 14, 2023
Immortal X-Men	#1–18	Kieron Gillen	Lucas Werneck	March 30, 2022	December 27, 2023
X-Men Red (vol. 2)	#1–18	Al Ewing	Stefano Caselli	April 6, 2022	December 13, 2023
Marauders (vol. 2)	#1–12	Steve Orlando	Eleonara Carlini	April 6, 2022	March 22, 2023
Legion of X	#1–10	Simon Spurrier	Jan Bazaldua	April 20, 2022	February 1, 2023
The Amazing Spider-Man (vol. 6)	#1–70	Zeb Wells, Joe Kelly & Justina Ireland	John Romita Jr., Ed McGuinness & Gleb Melnikov	April 27, 2022	March 26, 2025
Savage Avengers (vol. 2)	#1–10	David Pepose	Carlos Magno	May 4, 2022	February 22, 2023
Captain America: Symbol of Truth	#1–14	Tochi Onyebuchi	R.B. Silva	May 11, 2022	June 28, 2023
Captain America: Sentinel of Liberty (vol. 2)	#1–13	Collin Kelly & Jackson Lanzing	Carmen Carnero	June 1, 2022	June 7, 2023
Daredevil (vol. 7)	#1–14	Chip Zdarsky	Marco Checchetto	July 13, 2022	August 16, 2023
Shang-Chi and the Ten Rings	#1–6	Gene Luen Yang	Marcus To	July 20, 2022	December 28, 2022
X-Men Legends (vol. 2)	#1–6	Roy Thomas, Ann Nocenti, Whilce Portacio, Brian Haberlin	David Wachter, Javier Pina	August 10, 2022	February 8, 2023
Spider-Man (vol. 4)	#1–11	Dan Slott	Mark Bagley	October 5, 2022	August 16, 2023
Strange Academy: Finals	#1–6	Skottie Young	Humberto Ramos	October 26, 2022	April 26, 2023
Deadpool (vol. 9)	#1–10	Alyssa Wong	Martin Coccolo	November 2, 2022	August 23, 2023
Fantastic Four (vol. 7)	#1–33	Ryan North	Iban Coello	November 9, 2022	June 25, 2025
Miles Morales: Spider-Man (vol. 2)	#1–42	Cody Ziglar	Federico Vicentini	December 7, 2022	January 28, 2026
Invincible Iron Man (vol. 5)	#1–20	Gerry Duggan	Juan Frigeri	December 14, 2022	July 17, 2024
Scarlet Witch (vol. 3)	#1–10	Steve Orlando	Sara Pichelli	January 4, 2023	November 1, 2023
Red Goblin	#1–10	Alex Paknadel	Jan Bazaldua	February 8, 2023	November 15, 2023
Betsy Braddock: Captain Britain	#1–5	Tini Howard	Vasco Georgiev	February 22, 2023	June 21, 2023
Doctor Strange (vol. 6)	#1–18	Jed Mackay	Pasqual Ferry	March 22, 2023	August 7, 2024
Guardians of the Galaxy (vol. 7)	#1–10; Annual #1	Collin Kelly & Jackson Lanzing	Kev Walker	April 12, 2023	January 17, 2024
Avengers (vol. 9)	#1–36	Jed MacKay	CF Villa	May 17, 2023	March 4, 2026
Black Panther (vol. 9)	#1–10	Eve L. Ewing	Chris Allen	June 14, 2023	March 20, 2024
Incredible Hulk (vol. 4)	#1–30	Phillip Kennedy Johnson	Nic Klein	June 17, 2023	October 15, 2025
Blade (vol. 5)	#1–10	Bryan Hill	Elena Casagrande	July 19, 2023	April 24, 2024
Immortal Thor	#1–25	Al Ewing	Martín Cóccolo	August 23, 2023	July 2, 2025
Daredevil (vol. 8)	#1–25	Saladin Ahmed	Aaron Kuder	September 13, 2023	September 24, 2025
Captain America (vol. 11)	#1–16	J. Michael Straczynski	Jesús Saiz	September 20, 2023	December 18, 2024
G.O.D.S.	#1–8	Jonathan Hickman	Valerio Schiti	October 4, 2023	June 12, 2024
Sensational She-Hulk (vol. 2)	#1–10	Rainbow Rowell	Andrés Genolet	October 18, 2023	August 14, 2024
Captain Marvel (vol. 11)	#1–10	Alyssa Wong	Jan Bazaldua	October 25, 2023	July 31, 2024
Spider-Boy	#1–20	Dan Slott	Paco Medina	November 1, 2023	June 25, 2025
Carnage (vol. 4)	#1–8	Torunn Grønbekk	Pere Pérez	November 1, 2023	June 5, 2024
Punisher (vol. 14)	#1–4	David Pepose	Dave Wachter	November 8, 2023	February 28, 2024
Superior Spider-Man (vol. 3)	#1–8	Dan Slott	Mark Bagley	November 15, 2023	June 26, 2024
Spider-Woman (vol. 8)	#1–10	Steve Foxe	Carola Borelli	November 29, 2023	August 21, 2024
Vengeance of the Moon Knight (vol. 2)	#1–9	Jed MacKay	Alessandro Cappuccio	January 3, 2024	September 11, 2024
Ultimate Spider-Man (vol. 3)	#1–24	Jonathan Hickman	Marco Checchetto	January 10, 2024	February 18, 2026
Ultimate Black Panther	#1–24	Bryan Edward Hill	Stefano Caselli	February 7, 2024	January 21, 2026
Ultimate X-Men (vol. 2)	#1–24	Peach Momoko		March 6, 2024	February 11, 2026
Spectacular Spider-Men	#1–15	Greg Weisman	Humberto Ramos	March 6, 2024	May 7, 2025
Ghost Rider: Final Vengeance	#1–6	Benjamin Percy	Danny Kim	March 13, 2024	August 21, 2024
Deadpool (vol. 10)	#1–15	Cody Ziglar	Rogê Antônio	April 3, 2024	June 25, 2025
Spider-Gwen: The Ghost-Spider	#1–15	Stephanie Phillips	Chris Campana	May 22, 2024	July 2, 2025
Ultimates (vol. 4)	#1–24	Deniz Camp	Juan Frigeri	June 5, 2024	May 27, 2026
Scarlet Witch (vol. 4)	#1–10	Steve Orlando	Jacopo Camagni	June 12, 2024	March 5, 2025
Moon Knight: Fist of Khonshu	#0–15	Jed MacKay	Alessandro Cappuccio	July 3, 2024	December 17, 2025
X-Men (vol. 7)	#1– Annual #1	Jed MacKay	Ryan Stegman	July 10, 2024	
Phoenix	#1–15	Stephanie Phillips	Alessandro Miracolo	July 17, 2024	September 17, 2025
NYX (vol. 2)	#1–10	Collin Kelly & Jackson Lanzing	Francesco Mortarino	July 24, 2024	April 23, 2025
X-Force (vol. 7)	#1–10	Geoffrey Thorne	Marcus To	July 31, 2024	April 23, 2025
Uncanny X-Men (vol. 6)	#1– Annual #1	Gail Simone	David Marquez	August 7, 2024	
X-Factor (vol. 5)	#1–10	Mark Russell	Bob Quinn	August 14, 2024	May 14, 2025
Werewolf by Night (vol. 4)	#1–10	Jason Loo	Sergio Dávila	August 14, 2024	May 14, 2025
Exceptional X-Men	#1–13	Eve L. Ewing	Carmen Carnero	September 4, 2024	September 10, 2025
Wolverine (vol. 8)	#1–	Saladin Ahmed	Martín Cóccolo	September 11, 2024	
Spirits of Vengeance (vol. 2)	#1–6	Sabir Pirzada	Sean Damien Hill	September 18, 2024	February 5, 2025
Storm (vol. 5)	#1–12	Murewa Ayodele	Lucas Werneck	October 2, 2024	September 24, 2025
Iron Man (vol. 7)	#1–10	Spencer Ackerman	Julius Ohta	October 23, 2024	July 23, 2025
Psylocke (vol. 2)	#1–10	Alyssa Wong	Vincenzo Carratù	November 13, 2024	August 20, 2025
West Coast Avengers (vol. 4)	#1–10	Gerry Duggan	Danny Kim	November 27, 2024	August 27, 2025
All-New Venom	#1–10	Al Ewing	Carlos Gomez	December 4, 2024	September 3, 2025
Laura Kinney: Wolverine	#1–10	Erica Schultz	Giada Belviso	December 11, 2024	September 3, 2025
Hellverine (vol. 2)	#1–10	Benjamin Percy	Raffaele Ienco	December 18, 2024	September 10, 2025
Deadpool/Wolverine	#1–10	Benjamin Percy	Joshua Cassara	January 1, 2025	October 1, 2025
Magik (vol. 2)	#1–10	Ashley Allen	Germán Peralta	January 8, 2025	September 17, 2025
New Champions	#1–8	Steve Foxe	Ivan Fiorelli	January 8, 2025	August 13, 2025
Ultimate Wolverine	#1–16	Chris Condon	Alessandro Cappuccio	January 15, 2025	April 15, 2026
Eddie Brock: Carnage	#1–10	Charles Soule	Jesus Saiz	February 12, 2025	November 12, 2025
Red Hulk	#1–10	Benjamin Percy	Geoff Shaw	February 26, 2025	November 12, 2025
The Amazing Spider-Man (vol. 7)	#1– Annual #1	Joe Kelly	Pepe Larraz & John Romita Jr.	April 9, 2025	
Spider-Man & Wolverine	#1–10	Marc Guggenheim	Kaare Andrews	May 7, 2025	February 25, 2026
New Avengers (vol. 5)	#1–10	Sam Humphries	Ton Lima	June 11, 2025	March 18, 2026
Spider-Girl (vol. 3)	#1–7	Torunn Grønbekk	André Risso	June 11, 2025	December 3, 2025
Captain America (vol. 12)	#1–	Chip Zdarsky	Valerio Schiti	July 2, 2025	
Fantastic Four (vol. 8)	#1–	Ryan North	Humberto Ramos	July 16, 2025	
All-New Spider-Gwen: The Ghost-Spider	#1–10	Stephanie Phillips	Paolo Villanelli	August 20, 2025	May 6, 2026
Black Cat (vol. 3)	#1–	G. Willow Wilson	Gleb Melnikov	August 20, 2025	
Mortal Thor	#1–13	Al Ewing	Pasqual Ferry	August 27, 2025	July 29, 2026
Venom (vol. 6)	#250–262	Al Ewing	Paco Medina	October 1, 2025	September 30, 2026
Planet She-Hulk	#1–6	Stephanie Phillips	Aaron Kuder	November 5, 2025	April 29, 2026
Nova: Centurion	#1–6	Jed MacKay	Álvaro López	November 19, 2025	April 1, 2026
Infernal Hulk	#1–10	Phillip Kennedy Johnson	Nic Klein	November 26, 2025	August 12, 2026
Doctor Strange (vol. 8)	#1–10	Derek Landy	Ivan Fiorelli	December 3, 2025	September 9, 2026
Sorcerer Supreme	#1–10	Steve Orlando	Bernard Chang	December 31, 2025	September 30, 2026
Inglorious X-Force	#1–10	Tim Seeley	Michael Sta. Maria	January 21, 2026	October 21, 2026
Iron Man (vol. 8)	#1–	Joshua Williamson	Carmen Carnero	January 28, 2026	
Marc Spector: Moon Knight (vol. 2)	#1–	Jed MacKay	Devmalya Pramanik	February 11, 2026	
Wade Wilson: Deadpool	#1–	Benjamin Percy	Geoff Shaw	February 11, 2026	
Generation X-23	#1–10	Jody Houser	Jacopo Camagni	February 18, 2026	November 11, 2026
The Punisher (vol. 16)	#1–	Benjamin Percy	José Luis Soares	February 25, 2026	
X-Men United	#1–	Eve L. Ewing	Tiago Palma	March 11, 2026	
Daredevil (vol. 9)	#1–	Stephanie Phillips	Lee Garbett	April 1, 2026	
Miles Morales: Spider-Man (vol. 3)	#1–	Bryan Edward Hill	Nico Leon & Val de Landro	August 12, 2026	
Thor (vol. 7)	#800–	Al Ewing	Pasqual Ferry	August 19, 2026	
Midnight Fantastic Four	#1–	Benjamin Percy	Kev Walker	October 7, 2026	
Midnight Spider-Man	#1–	Phillip Kennedy Johnson	ScieTronc	October 7, 2026	
Midnight X-Men	#1–	Jonathan Hickman	Matteo Della Fonte	October 7, 2026	
Venom (vol. 7)	#1–	Charles Soule	Tommaso Bianchi	October 14, 2026	
Spider-Woman (vol. 9)	#1–	Dan Watters	Andrea Broccardo	November 4, 2026	
Avengers (vol. 10)	#1–	Chip Zdarsky	Marco Checchetto	November 4, 2026	
Maximum X-Men	#1–	Christopher Yost	Tony Daniel	December 2, 2026	

=== Events ===
Title	Issues	Writer	Artist	Debut Date
2099
2099 Alpha	#1	Nick Spencer	Viktor Bogdanovic	November 20, 2019
Fantastic Four 2099	#1	Karla Pacheco	Steven Cummings	November 20, 2019
Conan 2099	#1	Gerry Duggan	Roge Antonia	November 27, 2019
Punisher 2099	#1	Zac Thompson & Lonnie Nadler	Matt Horak	November 27, 2019
Ghost Rider 2099	#1	Ed Brisson	Damian Couceiro	December 4, 2019
Venom 2099	#1	Jody Houser	Francesco Mobili	December 4, 2019
Doom 2099	#1	Chip Zdarsky	Marco Castiello	December 11, 2019
Spider-Man 2099	#1	Nick Spencer	Jose Carlos Silva	December 11, 2019
2099 Omega	#1	Nick Spencer	Gerardo Sandoval	December 18, 2019
Absolute Carnage
Absolute Carnage	#1–5	Donny Cates	Ryan Stegman	August 7, 2019
Absolute Carnage: Separation Anxiety	#1	Clay McLeod Chapman	Brian Level	August 14, 2019
Absolute Carnage: Scream	#1–3	Cullen Bunn	Gerardo Sandoval	August 14, 2019
Absolute Carnage: Miles Morales	#1–3	Saladin Ahmed	Federico Vincentini	August 21, 2019
Absolute Carnage vs. Deadpool	#1–3	Frank Tieri	Marcelo Ferreira	August 21, 2019
Absolute Carnage: Lethal Protectors	#1–3	Frank Tieri	Alberto Jimenez Alburquerque	August 28, 2019
Absolute Carnage: Symbiote Spider-Man	#1	Peter David	Francesco Mobili	September 4, 2019
Absolute Carnage: Symbiote of Vengeance	#1	Ed Brisson	Juan Frigeri	September 11, 2019
Absolute Carnage: Avengers	#1	Leah Williams	Salvador Larroca	September 25, 2019
Absolute Carnage: Immortal Hulk	#1	Al Ewing	Filipe Andrade	October 2, 2019
Absolute Carnage: Weapon Plus	#1	Jed MacKay	Stefano Raffaele	November 6, 2019
Absolute Carnage: Captain Marvel	#1	Emily Lerner	Andrea Broccardo	November 20, 2019
Age of Revelation
X-Men: Age of Revelation	#0	Jed MacKay	Humberto Ramos	July 16, 2025
X-Men: Age of Revelation Overture	#1	Jed MacKay	Ryan Stegman & JP Mayer	October 1, 2025
World of Revelation	#1	Various		October 8, 2025
Amazing X-Men (vol. 3)	#1–3	Jed MacKay	Mahmud Asrar	October 8, 2025
Binary	#1–3	Stephanie Phillips	Giada Belviso	October 8, 2025
Laura Kinney: Sabretooth	#1–3	Erica Schultz	Valentina Pinti	October 8, 2025
Longshots	#1–3	Gerry Duggan & Jonathan Hickman	Alan Robinson	October 8, 2025
Iron & Frost	#1–3	Cavan Scott	Ruairí Coleman & Roberto Poggi	October 15, 2025
Rogue Storm	#1–3	Murewa Ayodele	Roland Boschi	October 15, 2025
Sinister's Six	#1–3	David Marquez	Rafael Loureiro	October 15, 2025
Unbreakable X-Men	#1–3	Gail Simone	Lucas Werneck	October 15, 2025
Last Wolverine	#1–3	Saladin Ahmed	Edgar Salazar	October 22, 2025
Omega Kids	#1–3	Tony Fleecs	Andrés Genolet	October 22, 2025
Radioactive Spider-Man	#1–3	Joe Kelly	Kev Walker	October 22, 2025
X-Men: Book of Revelation	#1–3	Jed MacKay	Netho Diaz & Sean Parsons	October 22, 2025
Cloak or Dagger	#1–3	Justina Ireland	Lorenzo Tammetta	October 29, 2025
Expatriate X-Men	#1–3	Eve Ewing	Francesco Mortarino	October 29, 2025
Undeadpool	#1–3	Tim Seeley	Carlos Magno	October 29, 2025
X-Vengers	#1–3	Jason Loo	Sergio Dávila & Aure Jimenez	October 29, 2025
X-Men: Age of Revelation Finale	#1	Jed MacKay	Ryan Stegman, Netho Diaz & JP Mayer	December 31, 2025
Age of X-Man
Age of X-Man Alpha	#1	Zac Thompson & Lonnie Nadler	Ramon Rosanas	January 30, 2019
Age of X-Man: Marvelous X-Men	#1–5	Zac Thompson & Lonnie Nadler	Marco Failla	February 6, 2019
Age of X-Man: Nextgen	#1–5	Ed Brisson	Marcus To	February 13, 2019
Age of X-Man: The Amazing Nightcrawler	#1–5	Seanan McGuire	Juan Frigeri	February 20, 2019
Age of X-Man: X-Tremists	#1–5	Leah Williams	Georges Jeanty	February 27, 2019
Age of X-Man: Prisoner X	#1–5	Vita Ayala	German Peralta	March 6, 2019
Age of X-Man: Apocalypse and the X-Tracts	#1–5	Tim Seeley	Salva Espin	March 13, 2019
Age of X-Man Omega	#1	Zac Thompson & Lonnie Nadler	Simone Buonfantino	July 17, 2019
Annihilation - Scourge
Annihilation - Scourge Alpha	#1	Matthew Rosenberg	Juanan Ramirez	November 20, 2019
Annihilation - Scourge: Fantastic Four	#1	Christos Gage	Diego Olortegui	December 4, 2019
Annihilation - Scourge: Nova	#1	Matthew Rosenberg	Ibraim Roberson	December 4, 2019
Annihilation - Scourge: Beta Ray Bill	#1	Michael Moreci	Alberto Alburquerque	December 11, 2019
Annihilation - Scourge: Silver Surfer	#1	Dan Abnett	Paul Davidson	December 11, 2019
Annihilation - Scourge Omega	#1	Matthew Rosenberg	Manuel Garcia	December 18, 2019
A.X.E.: Judgment Day
A.X.E.: Eve of Judgment	#1	Kieron Gillen	Pasqual Ferry	July 13, 2022
A.X.E.: Judgment Day	#1–6	Kieron Gillen	Valerio Schiti	July 20, 2022
A.X.E.: Death to the Mutants	#1–3	Kieron Gillen	Guiu Vilanova	August 17, 2022
A.X.E.: Avengers	#1	Kieron Gillen	Federico Vincentini	September 28, 2022
A.X.E.: X-Men	#1	Kieron Gillen	Francesco Mobili	October 5, 2022
A.X.E.: Starfox	#1	Kieron Gillen	Daniele DI Nicuolo	October 5, 2022
A.X.E.: Eternals	#1	Kieron Gillen	Pasqual Ferry	October 12, 2022
A.X.E.: Iron Fist	#1	Alyssa Wong	Michael YG	October 12, 2022
A.X.E.: Judgment Day Omega	#1	Kieron Gillen	Guiu Vilanova	November 2, 2022
Blood Hunt
Blood Hunt	#1–5	Jed MacKay	Pepe Larraz & Marte Gracia.	May 1, 2024
Blood Hunters	#1–4	Mark Russell, Bob Quinn & Erica Schultz	Bernard Chang, Christos Gage & Javier Garrón.	May 8, 2024
Dracula: Blood Hunt	#1–3	Danny Lore	Luigi Zagaria	May 8, 2024
Strange Academy: Blood Hunt	#1–3	Daniel José Older	Farid Karami	May 8, 2024
Union Jack the Ripper: Blood Hunt	#1–3	Cavan Scott	Kev Walker	May 15, 2024
The Amazing Spider-Man: Blood Hunt	#1–3	Justina Ireland	Marcelo Ferreira	May 15, 2024
Black Panther: Blood Hunt	#1–3	Cheryl Lynn Eaton	Farid Karami	May 29, 2024
Midnight Sons: Blood Hunt	#1–3	Bryan Hill	Germán Peralta	May 29, 2024
Wolverine: Blood Hunt	#1–4	Tom Waltz	Juan José Ryp	June 5, 2024
X-Men: Blood Hunt – Jubilee	#1	Preeti Chhibber	Enid Balám	June 12, 2024
X-Men: Blood Hunt – Magik	#1	Ashley Allen	Jesús Hervás	June 26, 2024
Werewolf by Night: Blood Hunt	#1	Jason Loo	Adam Gorham	July 3, 2024
X-Men: Blood Hunt – Psylocke	#1	Steve Foxe	Lynne Yoshii	July 3, 2024
Hulk: Blood Hunt	#1	Philip Kennedy Johnson	Danny Earls	July 10, 2024
X-Men: Blood Hunt – Laura Kinney The Wolverine	#1	Stephanie Phillips	Robert Gill	July 17, 2024
Bring on the Bad Guys
Bring on the Bad Guys: Doom	#1	Marc Guggenheim	Stefano Raffaele	June 18, 2025
Bring on the Bad Guys: Green Goblin	#1	Ethan S. Parker & Griffin Sheridan	Matteo Della Fonte	July 2, 2025
Bring on the Bad Guys: Abomination	#1	Phillip Kennedy Johnson	Sergio Dávila	July 16, 2025
Bring on the Bad Guys: Loki	#1	Anthony Oliveira	Jethro Morales	July 30, 2025
Bring on the Bad Guys: Red Skull	#1	Stephanie Phillips	Tommaso Bianchi	August 13, 2025
Bring on the Bad Guys: Dormammu	#1	Alex Paknadel	Javier Pina	August 27, 2025
Bring on the Bad Guys: Mephisto	#1	Marc Guggenheim	Álvaro López	August 27, 2025
Carnage Reigns
Carnage Reigns Alpha	#1	Alex Paknadel & Cody Ziglar	Julius Otha	May 3, 2023
Carnage Reigns Omega	#1	Cody Ziglar	Julius Otha	June 28, 2023
Dark Web
Gold Goblin	#1–5	Christopher Cantwell	Lan Medina	November 2, 2022
Dark Web	#1	Zeb Wells	Adam Kubert	December 7, 2022
Dark Web: X-Men	#1–3	Gerry Duggan	Rod Reis	December 14, 2022
Mary Jane & Black Cat	#1–5	Jed McKay	Vincenzo Carratù	December 21, 2022
Dark Web: Ms. Marvel	#1–2	Sabir Pirzada	Francesco Mortarino	December 21, 2022
Dark Web Finale	#1	Zeb Wells	Adam Kubert	February 1, 2023
Death of Doctor Strange
Death of Doctor Strange	#1–5	Jed MacKay	Lee Garbett	September 22, 2021
Strange Academy Presents: Death of Doctor Strange	#1	Skottie Young	Mike del Mundo	November 3, 2021
Death of Doctor Strange: Avengers	#1	Alex Paknadel	Ryan Bodenheim	November 3, 2021
Death of Doctor Strange: Spider-Man	#1	Jed MacKay	Marcelo Ferreira	December 1, 2021
Death of Doctor Strange: White Fox	#1	Alyssa Wong	Andie Tong	December 1, 2021
Death of Doctor Strange: Blade	#1	Danny Lore	Dylan Burnett	December 8, 2021
Death of Doctor Strange: Bloodstone	#1	Tini Howard	Ig Guara	January 12, 2022
Death of Doctor Strange: X-Men/Black Knight	#1	Si Spurrier	Bob Quinn	January 19, 2022
Devil's Reign
Devil's Reign	#1–6	Chip Zdarsky	Marco Checchetto	December 8, 2021
Devil's Reign: Superior Four	#1–3	Zac Thompson	Davide Tinto	January 12, 2022
Devil's Reign: Villains for Hire	#1–3	Clay McLeod Chapman	Manuel Garcia	January 19, 2022
Devil's Reign: X-Men	#1–3	Gerry Duggan	Phil Noto	January 19, 2022
Devil's Reign: Winter Soldier	#1	Collin Kelly & Jackson Lanzing	Nico Leon	January 26, 2022
Devil's Reign: Spider-Man	#1	Anthony Piper	Zé Carlos	February 23, 2022
Devil's Reign: Moon Knight	#1	Jed Mackay	Federico Sabbatini	March 2, 2022
Devil's Reign Omega	#1	Chip Zdarsky, Rodney Barnes & Jim Zub	Rafael De Latorre, Guillermo Sanna & Luciano Vecchio	May 18, 2022
Empyre
Empyre: Avengers	#0	Al Ewing	Pepe Larraz	June 24, 2020
Empyre: Fantastic Four	#0	Dan Slott	R.B. Silva	July 8, 2020
Empyre	#1–6	Al Ewing & Dan Slott	Valerio Schiti	July 15, 2020
Empyre: Avengers	#1–3	Jim Zub	Carlos Magno	July 22, 2020
Empyre: X-Men	#1–4	Various		July 22, 2020
Lords of Empyre: Emperor Hulkling	#1	Chip Zdarsky & Anthony Oliveira	Manuel Garcia	July 22, 2020
Empyre: Captain America	#1–3	Phillip Kennedy Johnson	Ariel Olivetti	July 29, 2020
Empyre: Savage Avengers	#1	Gerry Duggan	Greg Smallwood	July 29, 2020
Lords of Empyre: Celestial Messiah	#1	Alex Paknadel	Alex Lins	August 5, 2020
Lords of Empyre: Swordsman	#1	Alex Paknadel	Thomas Nachlik	August 19, 2020
Empyre Aftermath: Avengers	#1	Al Ewing	Valerio Schiti	September 9, 2020
Empyre Fallout: Fantastic Four	#1	Dan Slott	Sean Izaakse	September 9, 2020
Extermination
Extermination	#1–5	Ed Brisson	Pepe Larraz	August 15, 2018
X-Men: The Exterminated	#1	Zac Thompson, Lonnie Nadler & Chris Claremont	Neil Edwards	December 5, 2018
Extreme Carnage
Extreme Carnage Alpha	#1	Phillip Kennedy Johnson	Manuel Garcia	July 7, 2021
Extreme Carnage: Scream	#1	Clay McLeod Chapman	Chris Mooneyham	July 14, 2021
Extreme Carnage: Phage	#1	Steve Orlando	Gerardo Sandoval	July 21, 2021
Extreme Carnage: Lasher	#1	Clay McLeod Chapman	Chris Mooneyham	August 4, 2021
Extreme Carnage: Riot	#1	Alyssa Wong	Fran Galan	August 25, 2021
Extreme Carnage: Toxin	#1	Steve Orlando	Gerardo Sandoval	September 8, 2021
Extreme Carnage: Agony	#1	Alyssa Wong	Fran Galan	September 15, 2021
Extreme Carnage Omega	#1	Phillip Kennedy Johnson	Manuel Garcia	September 29, 2021
Fantastic Four: Reckoning War
Fantastic Four: Reckoning War Alpha	#1	Dan Slott	Carlos Pacheco	February 2, 2022
Reckoning War: Trial of the Watcher	#1	Dan Slott	Javier Rodriguez	March 16, 2022
Gang War
Amazing Spider-Man – Gang War: First Strike	#1	Zeb Wells	Joey Vasquez	November 29, 2023
Luke Cage: Gang War	#1–4	Rodney Barnes	Ramon F. Bachs	November 29, 2023
Daredevil: Gang War	#1–4	Erica Schultz	Sergio Davila	December 13, 2023
Deadly Hands of Kung Fu: Gang War	#1–3	Greg Pak	Caio Majado	December 27, 2023
Jackpot	#1	Celeste Bronfman	Joey Vasquez	January 17, 2024
Giant-Size X-Men
Giant Size X-Men	#1–2	Collin Kelly & Jackson Lanzing	Adam Kubert	May 28, 2025
Giant-Size Dark Phoenix Saga	#1	Collin Kelly & Jackson Lanzing	Rod Reis	June 11, 2025
Giant Size Age of Apocalypse	#1	Collin Kelly & Jackson Lanzing	C.F. Villa & Rafael Loureiro	May 28, 2025
Giant-Size House of M	#1	Collin Kelly & Jackson Lanzing	Francesco Manna	July 16, 2025
Heroes Reborn
Heroes Reborn	#1–7	Jason Aaron	Ed McGuiness	May 5, 2021
Heroes Reborn: Hyperion and the Imperial Guard	#1	Ryan Cady	Michele Bandini	May 12, 2021
Heroes Reborn: Peter Parker, The Amazing Shutterbug	#1	Marc Bernardin	Rafael De Latorre	May 12, 2021
Heroes Reborn: Magneto and the Mutant Force	#1	Steve Orlando	Bernard Chang	May 26, 2021
Heroes Reborn: Siege Society	#1	Cody Ziglar	Paco Medina	May 26, 2021
Heroes Reborn: Young Squadron	#1	Jim Zub	Steven Cummings	May 26, 2021
Heroes Reborn: American Knights	#1	Paul Grist	Christopher Allen	June 2, 2021
Heroes Reborn: Marvel Double Action	#1	Tim Seeley	Dan Jurgens	June 2, 2021
Heroes Reborn: Night-Gwen	#1	Vita Ayala	Farid Karami	June 9, 2021
Heroes Reborn: Squadron Savage	#1	Ethan Sacks	Luca Pizzari	June 9, 2021
Heroes Reborn: Weapon X and Final Flight	#1	Ed Brission	Roland Boschi	June 16, 2021
Heroes Return	#1	Jason Aaron	Ed McGuiness	June 23, 2021
Imperial
Imperial	#1–4	Jonathan Hickman	Federico Vicentini & Iban Coello	June 4, 2025
Imperial War: Black Panther	#1	Victor LaValle & Jonathan Hickman	CAFU	August 27, 2025
Imperial War: Planet She-Hulk	#1	Stephanie Phillips & Jonathan Hickman	Emilio Laiso	August 27, 2025
Imperial War: Exiles	#1	Steve Foxe & Jonathan Hickman	Francesco Manna	September 3, 2025
Imperial War: Nova - Centurion	#1	Jed MacKay & Jonathan Hickman	Matteo Della Fonte	September 10, 2025
Imperial War: Imperial Guardians	#1	Dan Abnett & Jonathan Hickman	Cory Smith, Luca Maresca & Wayne Faucher	October 8, 2025
Infinity Wars
Infinity Wars: Prime	#1	Gerry Duggan	Mike Deodato	July 25, 2018
Infinity Wars	#1–6	Gerry Duggan	Mike Deodato	August 1, 2018
Thanos Legacy	#1	Donny Cates & Gerry Duggan	Brian Level	September 5, 2018
Infinity Wars: Soldier Supreme	#1–2	Gerry Duggan	Adam Kubert	September 19, 2018
Infinity Wars: Iron Hammer	#1–2	Al Ewing	Ramon Rosanas	September 26, 2018
Infinity Wars: Sleepwalker	#1–4	Chris Sims & Chad Bowers	Todd Nauck	October 3, 2018
Infinity Wars: Weapon Hex	#1–2	Ben Acker	Gerardo Sandoval	October 17, 2018
Infinity Wars: Arachknight	#1–2	Max Bemis	Alé Garza	October 24, 2018
Infinity Wars: Infinity Warps	#1–2	Various		November 14, 2018
Infinity Wars: Ghost Panther	#1–2	Jed MacKay	Jefte Palo	November 21, 2018
Infinity Wars: Fallen Guardian	#1	Gerry Duggan	Andy MacDonald	December 19, 2018
Infinity Wars: Infinity	#1	Gerry Duggan	Mark Bagley	January 2, 2019
Iron Man 2020
Iron Man 2020	#1–6	Dan Slott & Christos Gage	Pete Woods	January 15, 2020
2020 Machine Man	#1–2	Christos Gage & Tom DeFalco	Andy MacDonald	February 19, 2020
2020 Force Works	#1–3	Matthew Rosenberg	Juanan Ramirez	February 26, 2020
2020 Rescue	#1–2	Dana Schwartz	Jacen Burrows	March 4, 2020
2020 Iron Age	#1	Tom DeFalco, Christopher Cantwell & Fonda Lee	Nick Roche, Matt Horak & Damian Couceiro	March 18, 2020
2020 Ironheart	#1–2	Vita Ayala & Danny Lore	David Messina	May 20, 2020
2020 iWolverine	#1–2	Larry Hama	Roland Boschi	July 15, 2020
King in Black
Symbiote Spider-Man: King in Black	#1–5	Peter David	Greg Land	November 18, 2020
King in Black	#1–5	Donny Cates	Ryan Stegman	December 2, 2020
King in Black: Namor	#1–5	Kurt Busiek	Ben Dewey	December 9, 2020
King in Black: Immortal Hulk	#1	Al Ewing	Aaron Kuder	December 16, 2020
King in Black: Iron Man/Doctor Doom	#1	Christopher Cantwell	Salvador Larroca	December 30, 2020
King in Black: Return of the Valkyries	#1–4	Jason Aaron & Torunn Grønbekk	Nina Vakueva	January 6, 2021
King in Black: Gwenom vs Carnage	#1–3	Seanan McGuire	Flaviano	January 13, 2021
King in Black: Planet of the Symbiotes	#1–3	Clay McLeod Chapman & Frank Tieri	Guiu Vilanova & Danilo Beyruth	January 13, 2021
King in Black: Thunderbolts	#1–3	Matthew Rosenberg	Juan Ferreyra	January 13, 2021
King in Black: Black Knight	#1	Simon Spurrier	Jesus Saiz	February 3, 2021
King in Black: Marauders	#1	Gerry Duggan	Luke Ross	February 3, 2021
King in Black: Black Panther	#1	Geoffrey Thorne	Germán Peralta	February 10, 2021
King in Black: Captain America	#1	Danny Lore	Mirko Colak	March 3, 2021
King in Black: Wiccan and Hulkling	#1	Tini Howard	Luciano Vecchio	March 3, 2021
King in Black: Spider-Man	#1	Jed Mackay	Michele Bandini	March 17, 2021
King in Black: Scream	#1	Clay McLeod Chapman	Garry Brown	March 24, 2021
King in Black: Ghost Rider	#1	Ed Brisson	Juan Frigeri	March 31, 2021
Last Annihilation
Cable: Reloaded	#1	Al Ewing	Bob Quinn	August 25, 2021
Last Annihilation: Wiccan and Hulkling	#1	Anthony Oliviera	Jan Bazaldua	September 1, 2021
Last Annihilation: Wakanda	#1	Evan Narcisse	German Peralta	September 15, 2021
One World Under Doom
One World Under Doom	#1–9	Ryan North	R.B. Silva	February 12, 2025
Doom Academy	#1–5	Mackenzie Cadenhead	Pasqual Ferry	February 19, 2025
Doom's Division	#1–5	Yoon Ha Lee	Minkyu Jung	February 19, 2025
Thunderbolts: Doomstrike	#1–5	Collin Kelly & Jackson Lanzing	Tommaso Bianchi	February 19, 2025
Doctor Strange of Asgard	#1–5	Derek Landy	Carlos Magno	March 5, 2025
Superior Avengers	#1–6	Steve Foxe	Luca Maresca	April 16, 2025
Runaways	#1–5	Rainbow Rowell	Elena Casagrande	June 11, 2025
G.O.D.S: One World Under Doom	#1	Ryan North	Francesco Mortarino	July 30, 2025
Doomed 2099	#1	Frank Tieri	Delio Diaz & Frank Alpizar	August 27, 2025
Sins of Sinister
Sins of Sinister	#1	Kieron Gillen	Lucas Werneck	January 25, 2023
Storm & the Brotherhood of Mutants	#1–3	Al Ewing	Paco Medina, Patch Zircher, Alessandro Vitti	February 8, 2023
Nightcrawlers	#1–3	Si Spurrier	Paco Medina, Patch Zircher, Alessandro Vitti	February 15, 2023
Immoral X-Men	#1–3	Kieron Gillen	Paco Medina, Patch Zircher, Alessandro Vitti	February 22, 2023
Sins of Sinister: Dominion	#1	Kieron Gillen	Lucas Werneck & Paco Medina	April 26, 2023
Spider-Geddon
Edge of Spider-Geddon	#1–4	Various		August 15, 2018
Spider-Geddon	#0	Christos Gage	Clayton Crain	September 26, 2018
Superior Octopus	#1	Christos Gage	Mike Hawthorne	October 3, 2018
Spider-Geddon	#1–5	Christos Gage	Jorge Molina	October 10, 2018
Spider-Girls	#1–3	Jody Houser	Andres Genolet	October 24, 2018
Spider-Force	#1–3	Christopher Priest	Paulo Siquiera	October 31, 2018
Vault of Spiders	#1–2	Cullen Bunn & Jed MacKay	Javier Pulido & Sheldon Vella	October 31, 2018
Spider-Man 2099: Exodus
Spider-Man 2099: Exodus – Alpha	#1	Steve Orlando	Paul Fry	May 4, 2022
Spider-Man 2099: Exodus	#1–5	Steve Orlando	Dave Wachter & Marco Castiello	May 11, 2022
Spider-Man 2099: Exodus – Omega	#1	Steve Orlando	Paul Fry	July 6, 2022
Summer of Symbiotes
Cult of Carnage: Misery	#1–5	Sabir Pirzada	Francesco Mortarino	May 3, 2023
Carnage Reigns Alpha	#1	Alex Paknadel & Cody Ziglar	Julius Otha	May 3, 2023
Extreme Venomverse	#1–5	Ryan North	Paolo Siqueira	May 10, 2023
Carnage Reigns Omega	#1	Cody Ziglar	Julius Otha	June 28, 2023
Web of Carnage	#1	Ram V	Francesco Manina	July 2, 2023
Death of the Venomverse	#1–5	Cullen Bunn & David Micheline	Gerardo Sandoval	August 2, 2023
The Darkhold
The Darkhold Alpha	#1	Steve Orlando	Cian Tormey	September 29, 2021
The Darkhold: Iron Man	#1	Ryan North	Guillermo Sanna	October 13, 2021
The Darkhold: Blade	#1	Daniel Kibblesmith	Federico Sabbatini	October 27, 2021
The Darkhold: Wasp	#1	Jordie Bellaire	Claire Roe	November 17, 2021
The Darkhold: Black Bolt	#1	Mark Russell	David Cutler	December 1, 2021
The Darkhold: Spider-Man	#1	Alex Paknadel	Diogenes Neves	December 22, 2021
The Darkhold Omega	#1	Steve Orlando	Cian Tormey	January 5, 2022
Venom War
Venom War	#1–5	Al Ewing	Iban Coello	August 7, 2024
Venom War: Spider-Man	#1–4	Collin Kelly & Jackson Lanzing	Greg Land	August 14, 2024
Venom War: Venomous	#1–3	Erica Schultz	Luciano Vecchio	August 21, 2024
Venom War: Carnage	#1–3	Torunn Grønbekk	Pere Pérez	August 21, 2024
Venom War: Zombiotes	#1–3	Cavan Scott	Juan José Ryp	August 28, 2024
Venom War: Wolverine	#1–3	Tim Seeley & Tony Fleecs	Kev Walker	September 11, 2024
Venom War: Deadpool	#1–3	Cullen Bunn	Rob di Salvo	September 18, 2024
Venom War: Lethal Protectors	#1–3	Sabir Pirzada	Luca Maresca	September 18, 2024
Venom War: Daredevil	#1	Chris Condon	Lan Medina	September 25, 2024
Venom War: Fantastic Four	#1–3	Adam Warren	Joey Vasquez	October 30, 2024
Venom War: It's Jeff	#1	Kelly Thompson	Gurihiru	November 20, 2024
War of the Realms
War of the Realms	#1–6	Jason Aaron	Russell Dauterman & Matt Wilson	April 3, 2019
War of the Realms: Journey Into Mystery	#1–5	Clint McElroy, Justin McElroy, Travis McElroy & Griffin McElroy	André Lima Araújo	April 10, 2019
War of the Realms: War Scrolls	#1–3	Jason Aaron, Chip Zdarsky & Josh Trujillo	Andrea Sorrentino & Joe Quinones	April 17, 2019
War of the Realms: Punisher	#1–3	Gerry Duggan	Marcelo Ferreira	April 17, 2019
War of the Realms: Uncanny X-Men	#1–3	Matthew Rosenberg	Pere Perez	April 24, 2019
War of the Realms Strikeforce: The Dark Elf Realm	#1	Bryan Edward Hill	Leinil Francis Yu	May 1, 2019
War of the Realms: The New Agents of Atlas	#1–4	Greg Pak & Gang-Hyuk Lim	Billy Tan	May 8, 2019
Giant-Man	#1–3	Leah Williams	Marco Castiello	May 15, 2019
Spider-Man & the League of Realms	#1–3	Sean Rean	Nico Leon	May 15, 2019
War of the Realms Strikeforce: The War Avengers	#1	Dennis Hopeless	Kim Jacinto	May 15, 2019
War of the Realms Strikeforce: The Land of Giants	#1	Tom Taylor	Jorge Molina	May 22, 2019
War of the Realms Omega	#1	Jason Aaron, Al Ewing, Gerry Duggan & Daniel Kibblesmith	Juan Ferreyra	July 10, 2019
Weapons of Vengeance
Ghost Rider/Wolverine: Weapons of Vengeance Alpha	#1	Benjamin Percy	Geoff Shaw	August 9, 2023
Ghost Rider/Wolverine: Weapons of Vengeance Omega	#1	Benjamin Percy	Geoff Shaw	September 6, 2023
X of Swords
X of Swords: Creation	#1	Jonathan Hickman	Pepe Larraz	September 23, 2020
X of Swords: Stasis	#1	Jonathan Hickman & Tini Howard	Pepe Larraz & Mahmud A. Asrar	October 28, 2020
X of Swords: Destruction	#1	Jonathan Hickman & Tini Howard	Pepe Larraz	November 25, 2020
X-Men: Before The Fall
X-Men: Before The Fall – Sons of X	#1	Si Spurrier	Phil Noto	May 3, 2023
X-Men: Before The Fall – Mutants' First Strike	#1	Steve Orlando	Valentina Pinti	June 7, 2023
X-Men: Before The Fall – The Heralds of Apocalypse	#1	Al Ewing	Luca Pizzari	June 28, 2023
X-Men: Before The Fall – The Sinister Four	#1	Kieron Gillen	Paco Medina	July 5, 2023

=== Limited series ===
Title	Issues	Writer	Artist	Debut Date
1776	#1–5	J. Michael Straczynski	Ron Lim & Sean Damien Hill	November 12, 2025
Agents of Atlas (vol. 3)	#1–5	Greg Pak & Jeff Parker	Gang Hyuk Lim & Carlo Pagulayan	August 7, 2019
Alias: Red Band	#1–5	Sam Humphries	Geraldo Borges	March 11, 2026
All-Out Avengers	#1–5	Derek Landy	Greg Land	September 7, 2022
Alpha Flight (vol. 5)	#1–5	Ed Brisson	Scott Godlewski	August 16, 2023
Amazing Fantasy (vol. 3)	#1–5	Kaare Kyle Andrews		July 28, 2021
Amazing Spider-Man: Daily Bugle	#1–2	Mat Johnson	Mack Chater	January 29, 2020
Amazing Spider-Man: Spider-Versity	#1–5	Jordan Morris & Joe Kelly	Pere Pérez	April 22, 2026
Amazing Spider-Man: Torn	#1–5	J. Michael Straczynski	Pere Pérez	October 8, 2025
America Chavez: Made in the U.S.A.	#1–5	Kalinda Vasquez	Carlos Gomez	March 3, 2021
Annihilation 2099	#1–5	Steve Orlando	Ibraim Roberson	July 3, 2024
Ant-Man (vol. 2)	#1–5	Zeb Wells	Dylan Burnett	February 5, 2020
Ant-Man (vol. 3)	#1–4	Al Ewing	Tom Reilly	June 8, 2022
Ant-Man & the Wasp	#1–5	Mark Waid	Javier Garron	June 6, 2018
Astonishing Iceman	#1–5	Steve Orlando	Vincenzo Carratù	August 2, 2023
Atlantis Attacks	#1–5	Greg Pak	Ario Anindito	January 22, 2020
Avengers Assemble (vol. 3)	#1–5	Steve Orlando	Cory Smith	September 11, 2024
Avengers Beyond	#1–5	Derek Landy	Greg Land	March 29, 2023
Avengers Forever (vol. 2)	#1–15	Jason Aaron	Aaron Kuder	December 22, 2021
Avengers Inc.	#1–5	Al Ewing	Leonard Kirk	September 13, 2023
Avengers of the Wastelands	#1–5	Ed Brisson	Jonas Scharf	January 29, 2020
Avengers Twilight	#1–6	Chip Zdarsky	Daniel Acuña	January 17, 2024
Avengers: Mech Strike	#1–5	Jed MacKay	Carlos Magno	February 3, 2021
Avengers: No Road Home	#1–10	Al Ewing, Jim Zub & Mark Waid	Paco Medina	February 13, 2019
Avengers: Tech-On	#1–6	Jim Zub	Jeff 'Chamba' Cruz	August 11, 2021
Avengers: War Across Time	#1–5	Paul Levtiz	Alan Davies	January 11, 2023
Battleworld	#1–5	Christos Gage	Marcus To	September 24, 2025
Ben Reilly: Spider-Man	#1–5	J.M. DeMatteis	David Baldeón	January 19, 2022
Beta Ray Bill	#1–5	Daniel Warren Johnson		March 31, 2021
Bishop: War College	#1–5	J. Holtham	Sean Damien Hill	February 8, 2023
Black Knight: Curse of the Ebony Blade	#1–5	Simon Spurrier	Sergio Davila	March 17, 2021
Black Order	#1–5	Derek Landy	Philip Tan	November 1, 2018
Black Panther Intergalactic	#1–4	Victor LaValle	Stefano Nesi	December 17, 2025
Black Panther Legends	#1–4	Tochi Onyebuchi	Setor Fiadzigbey	October 13, 2021
Black Panther vs. Deadpool	#1–5	Daniel Kibblesmith	Ricardo Lopez Ortiz	October 24, 2018
Black Widow (vol. 7)	#1–5	Jen Soska & Sylvia Soska	Flaviano Armentaro	January 16, 2019
Black Widow & Hawkeye	#1–4	Stephanie Phillips	Paolo Villanelli	March 13, 2024
Blade: Red Band	#1–5	Bryan Edward Hill	C.F. Villa	October 9, 2024
Blood Hunters	#1–5	Erica Schultz	Bernard Chang	August 7, 2024
Bloodline: Daughter of Blade	#1–5	Danny Lore	Karen S. Darboe	February 1, 2023
Cable (vol. 5)	#1–4	Fabian Nicieza	Scot Eaton	January 17, 2024
Cable: Love and Chrome	#1–5	David Pepose	Mike Henderson	January 15, 2025
Captain America/Iron Man	#1–5	Derek Landy	Angel Unzueta	November 24, 2021
Captain Carter	#1–5	Jamie McKelvie	Marika Cresta	March 9, 2022
Captain Marvel: Dark Past	#1–5	Paul Jenkins	Lucas Werneck	April 1, 2026
Captain Marvel: Dark Tempest	#1–5	Ann Nocenti	Paolo Villanelli	July 5, 2023
Capwolf & The Howling Commandos	#1–4	Stephanie Phillips	Carlos Magno	October 11, 2023
Carnage: Black, White & Blood	#1–4	Various		March 24, 2021
Chasm: Curse of Kaine	#1–4	Steve Foxe	Andrea Broccardo	August 28, 2024
Children of the Vault	#1–4	Deniz Camp	Luca Maresca	August 9, 2023
Civil War: Unmasked	#1–5	Christos Gage	Edgar Salazar	May 6, 2026
Clobberin' Time	#1–5	Steve Skroce		March 29, 2023
Conquest 2099	#1–5	Steve Orlando	Ibraim Roberson & Jose Luis	October 9, 2024
Contagion	#1–5	Ed Brisson	Various	October 2, 2019
Cosmic Ghost Rider	#1–5	Donny Cates	Dylan Burnett	July 4, 2018
Cosmic Ghost Rider (vol. 2)	#1–5	Stephanie Phillips	Juan Cabal	March 1, 2023
Cosmic Ghost Rider Destroys Marvel History	#1–6	Paul Scheer & Nick Giovannetti	Gerardo Sandoval	March 6, 2019
Cyclops (vol. 4)	#1–5	Alex Paknadel	Rogê Antônio	February 11, 2026
Damage Control	#1–5	Adam F. Goldberg, Hans Rodionoff & Charlotte Fulerton	Will Robinson & Carlos Pacheco	August 24, 2022
Danny Ketch: Ghost Rider	#1–4	Howard Mackie	Javier Saltares	May 17, 2023
Daredevil & Echo	#1–4	Taboo & B. Earl	Phil Noto	May 24, 2023
Daredevil & Punisher: The Devil's Trigger	#1–5	Jimmy Palmiotti	Tommaso Bianchi	November 26, 2025
Daredevil: Black Armor	#1–4	D.G. Chichester	Netho Diaz	November 22, 2023
Daredevil: Cold Day in Hell	#1–3	Charles Soule	Steve McNiven	April 2, 2025
Daredevil: Unleash Hell	#1–5	Erica Schultz	Valentina Pinti	January 8, 2025
Daredevil: Woman Without Fear (vol. 1)	#1–3	Chip Zdarsky	Rafael De Latorre	January 12, 2022
Daredevil: Woman Without Fear (vol. 2)	#1–4	Erica Schultz	Michael Dowling	July 17, 2024
Dark Ages	#1–6	Tom Taylor	Iban Coello	September 1, 2021
Dark Agnes	#1–2	Becky Cloonan	Luca Pizzari	February 5, 2020
Dark X-Men (vol. 2)	#1–5	Steve Foxe	Jonas Scharf	August 16, 2023
Darkhawk (vol. 2)	#1–5	Kyle Higgins	Juanan Ramirez	September 25, 2021
Dazzler (vol. 2)	#1–4	Jason Loo	Rafael Loureiro	September 18, 2024
Dead Man Logan	#1–12	Ed Brisson	Mike Henderson	November 28, 2018
Dead X-Men	#1–4	Steve Foxe	Vincenzo Carratù, Bernard Chang & Jonas Scharf	January 31, 2024
Deadly Hands of K'un-Lun	#1–5	Yifan Jiang	Paco Medina	February 18, 2026
Deadly Neighborhood Spider-Man	#1–5	Taboo & B. Earl	Juan Ferreyra	October 19, 2022
Deadpool Team-up (vol. 3)	#1–5	Rob Liefeld		August 28, 2024
Deadpool & Wolverine: WWIII	#1–3	Joe Kelly	Adam Kubert	May 1, 2024
Deadpool: Assassin	#1–6	Cullen Bunn	Mark Bagley	June 13, 2018
Deadpool: Bad Blood	#1–4	Rob Liefeld, Chris Sims & Chris Bowers	Rob Liefeld	April 6, 2022
Deadpool: Badder Blood	#1–5	Rob Liefeld		June 7, 2023
Deadpool: Black, White & Blood	#1–4	Various		August 4, 2021
Deadpool Kills the Marvel Universe One Last Time	#1–5	Cullen Bunn	Dalibor Talajić	April 2, 2025
Death of the Inhumans	#1–5	Donny Cates	Ariel Olivetti	July 4, 2018
Death of the Silver Surfer	#1–5	Greg Pak	Sumit Kumar	June 11, 2025
Death's Head (vol. 2)	#1–4	Tini Howard	Kei Zama	July 31, 2019
Defenders (vol. 6)	#1–5	Al Ewing	Javier Rodriguez	August 11, 2021
Defenders: Beyond	#1–5	Al Ewing	Javier Rodriguez	June 16, 2022
Doctor Strange: Fall Sunrise	#1–4	Tradd Moore		November 23, 2022
Domino: Hotshots	#1–5	Gail Simone	David Baldeon	March 6, 2019
Dungeons of Doom	#1–3	Benjamin Percy & Phillip Kennedy Johnson	Carlos Magno, Georges Jeanty, Justin Mason & Robert Gill	January 14, 2026
Edge of Spider-Verse (vol. 2)	#1–5	Dan Slott	Mark Bagley	August 3, 2022
Edge of Spider-Verse (vol. 3)	#1–4	Karla Pacheco, Zander Cannon & David Hein	Pere Pérez, Guillermo Sana & Luciano Veccio	May 3, 2023
Edge of Spider-Verse (vol. 4)	#1–4	Collin Kelly, Jackson Lanzing & Nilah Magruder	Travel Foreman & Eric Gapstur	February 21, 2024
Elektra: Black, White & Blood	#1–4	Various		January 5, 2022
Emma Frost: The White Queen	#1–5	Amy Chu	Andrea Di Vito	June 18, 2025
Falcon & Winter Soldier	#1–5	Derek Landy	Federico Vicentini	February 26, 2020
Fall of the House of X	#1–5	Gerry Duggan	Lucas Werneck	January 3, 2024
Fantastic Four Fanfare	#1–4	Mark Waid, Alan Davis & Andrew Wheeler	Ramon Rosanas, Alan Davis & Sara Pichelli	May 7, 2025
Fantastic Four: Antithesis	#1–4	Mark Waid	Neal Adams	August 26, 2020
Fantastic Four: Grand Design	#1–2	Tom Scioli		October 16, 2019
Fantastic Four: Life Story	#1–6	Mark Russell	Sean Izaakse	May 19, 2021
Fearless	#1–4	Seanan McGuire & Leah Williams	Claire Roe	July 24, 2019
Gambit (vol. 6)	#1–5	Chris Claremont	Sid Kotian	May 11, 2022
Gamma Flight	#1–5	Al Ewing & Crystal Frasier	Lan Medina	June 23, 2021
Genis-Vell: Captain Marvel	#1–5	Peter David	Juanan Ramírez	June 1, 2022
Get Fury	#1–6	Garth Ennis	Jacen Burrows	May 1, 2024
Groot	#1–5	Dan Abnett	Damian Couceiro	May 3, 2023
Gwen Stacy	#1–2	Christos Gage	Todd Nauck	February 12, 2020
Gwenpool	#1–5	Cavan Scott	Stefano Nesi	May 14, 2025
Gwenpool Strikes Back	#1–5	Leah Williams	David Baldeon	August 14, 2019
Hallows' Eve	#1–5	Erica Schultz	Michael Dowling	March 1, 2023
Hawkeye: Freefall	#1–6	Matthew Rosenberg	Otto Schmidt	January 1, 2020
Hawkeye: Kate Bishop	#1–5	Marieke Nijkamp	Enid Balam	November 24, 2021
Hellcat	#1–5	Christopher Cantwell	Alex Lins	March 15, 2023
Hellhunters	#1–5	Phillip Kennedy Johnson	Adam Gorham	December 15, 2024
Hellverine	#1–4	Benjamin Percy	Julius Ohta	May 29, 2024
History of the Marvel Universe	#1–6	Mark Waid	Javier Rodríguez	July 24, 2019
House of X	#1–6	Jonathan Hickman	Pepe Larraz	July 24, 2019
How to Read Comics the Marvel Way	#1–4	Christopher Hastings	Scott Koblish	December 1, 2021
Hulk: Smash Everything	#1–5	Ryan North	Vincenzo Carratù	December 3, 2025
Hulkverines	#1–3	Greg Pak	Ario Anindito	February 20, 2019
I am Iron Man	#1–5	Murewa Ayodele	Dotun Akande	March 1, 2023
Iceman (vol. 4)	#1–5	Sina Grace	Nate Stockman	September 12, 2018
Imperial Guardians	#1–5	Dan Abnett	Marcelo Ferreira	March 11, 2026
Inferno (vol. 2)	#1–4	Jonathan Hickman	Valerio Schiti, R.B. Silva & Stefano Caselli	September 29, 2021
Infinity Watch	#1–5	Derek Landy	Ruairi Coleman	December 4, 2024
Invisible Woman	#1–5	Mark Waid	Adam Hughes	July 10, 2019
Iron Cat	#1–5	Jed MacKay	Pere Pérez	June 8, 2022
Iron Fist (vol. 6)	#1–5	Alyssa Wong	Michael YG	February 16, 2022
Iron Fist: Heart of the Dragon	#1–6	Larry Hama	David Wachter	January 20, 2021
Jackpot & Black Cat	#1–4	Celeste Bronfman	Emilio Laiso	March 27, 2024
Jane Foster & the Mighty Thor	#1–5	Torunn Grønbekk	Michael Dowling	June 1, 2022
Jean Grey (vol. 2)	#1–4	Louise Simonson	Bernard Chang	August 23, 2023
Jeff the Land Shark	#1–5	Kelly Thompson	Tokitokoro	June 4, 2025
Joe Fixit	#1–5	Peter David	Yildiary Cinar	January 4, 2023
Juggernaut (vol. 3)	#1–5	Fabian Nicieza	Ron Garney	September 23, 2020
Ka-Zar: Lord of the Savage Land	#1–5	Zac Thompson	German Garcia	September 8, 2021
Kang the Conqueror	#1–5	Collin Kelly & Jackson Lanzing	Carlos Magno & Espen Grundetjern	August 18, 2021
Kid Venom	#1–4	Taigami		July 10, 2024
Killmonger	#1–5	Bryan Edward Hill	Juan Ferreyra	December 5, 2018
King Conan	#1–6	Jason Aaron	Mahmud Asrar	December 22, 2021
King Thor	#1–4	Jason Aaron	Esad Ribić	September 11, 2019
Knights of X	#1–5	Tini Howard	Bob Quinn	April 20, 2022
Knull	#1–5	Al Ewing & Tom Waltz	Juanan Ramirez	January 14, 2026
Logan: Black, White & Blood	#1–4	Various		January 14, 2026
Loki (vol. 4)	#1–4	Dan Watters	Germán Peralta	June 7, 2023
M.O.D.O.K.: Head Games	#1–4	Jordan Blum & Patton Oswalt	Scott Hepburn	December 2, 2020
Maestro	#1–5	Peter David	Germán Peralta & Dale Keown	August 19, 2020
Maestro: War & Pax	#1–5	Peter David	Javier Pina	January 20, 2021
Maestro: World War M	#1–5	Peter David	Germán Peralta & Pasqual Ferry	February 9, 2022
Magik & Colossus	#1–5	Ashley Allen	Germán Peralta	February 4, 2026
Magneto (vol. 4)	#1–4	J.M. Dematteis	Todd Nauck	August 2, 2023
Major X	#1–6	Rob Liefeld	Whilce Portacio & Brent Peeples	April 3, 2019
Man Without Fear	#1–5	Jed MacKay	Danilo Beyruth	January 2, 2019
Marvel	#1–6	Various		March 4, 2020
Marvel Knights (vol. 3)	#1–6	Donny Cates	Travel Foreman	November 7, 2018
Marvel Knights: The Punisher	#1–4	Jimmy Palmiotti	Dan Panosian	October 8, 2025
Marvel Knights: The world to come	#1–6	Joe Quesada & Christopher Priest	Joe Quesada	June 4, 2025
Marvel Rising (vol. 2)	#1–5	Nilah Magruder	Roberto Di Salvo	March 27, 2019
Marvel Super Heroes Secret Wars: Battleworld	#1–4	Tom DeFalco	Pat Olliffe	November 22, 2023
Marvel Unleashed	#1–4	Kyle Starks	Jesús Hervás	August 23, 2023
Marvel Zombies: Black, White & Red	#1–4	Thomas Krajewski	Jason Muhr	October 25, 2023
Marvel Zombies: Dawn of Decay	#1–4	Garth Ennis, Alex Segura & Ashley Allen	Rachael Stott, Javi Fernández & Justin Mason	September 4, 2024
Marvel Zombies: Red Band	#1–5	Ethan S. Parker & Griffin Sheridan	Jan Bazaldua	September 17, 2025
Marvel Zombies: Resurrection (vol. 2)	#1–4	Phillip Kennedy Johnson	Leonard Kirk	September 2, 2020
Marvel: Black, White & Blood and Guts	#1–4	Various		October 8, 2025
Marvels X	#1–6	Alex Ross & Jim Krueger	Well-Bee	January 8, 2020
Mech Strike: Monster Hunters	#1–5	Christos Gage	Paco Diaz	June 19, 2022
Meet the Skrulls	#1–5	Robbie Thompson	Niko Henrichon	March 6, 2019
Midnight Suns	#1–5	Ethan Sacks	Luigi Zagaria	September 14, 2022
Miguel O'Hara - Spider-Man 2099	#1–5	Steve Orlando	Various	January 3, 2024
Monica Rambeau: Photon	#1–5	Eve L. Ewing	Michael Sta. Maria	December 14, 2022
Moon Girl and Devil Dinosaur (vol. 2)	#1–5	Jordan Ifueko	Alba Glez	December 7, 2022
Moon Knight: Black, White and Blood	#1–4	Various		May 11, 2022
Moon Knight: City of the Dead	#1–5	David Pepose	Marcelo Ferreira	July 19, 2023
Moonstar	#1–5	Ashley Allen	Edoardo Audino	March 4, 2026
Ms. Marvel: Beyond the Limit	#1–5	Samira Ahmed	Andrés Genolet	December 22, 2021
Ms. Marvel: Mutant Menace	#1–4	Sabir Pirzada & Iman Vellani	Scott Godlewski	March 6, 2024
Ms. Marvel: The New Mutant	#1–4	Sabir Pirzada & Iman Vellani	Carlos Gomez & Adam Gorham	August 30, 2023
Multiple Man	#1–5	Matthew Rosenberg	Andy MacDonald	June 27, 2018
Mystique (vol. 2)	#1–5	Declan Shalvey		October 16, 2024
Namor (vol. 2)	#1–8	Jason Aaron	Paul Davidson	July 17, 2024
Namor: Conquered Shores	#1–5	Christopher Cantwell	Pasqual Ferry	October 19, 2022
Nebula	#1–2	Vita Ayala	Claire Roe	February 12, 2020
New Fantastic Four	#1–5	Peter David	Alan Robinson	May 25, 2022
New Mutants Lethal Legion	#1–5	Charlie Jane Anders	Enid Balám	March 8, 2023
Night Thrasher (vol. 2)	#1–4	J. Holtham	Nelson Dániel	February 14, 2024
Old Man Quill	#1–12	Ethan Sacks	Robert Gill	February 6, 2019
Peter Parker & Miles Morales: Spider-Men Double Trouble	#1–4	Mariko Tamaki & Vita Ayala	Gurihiru	November 30, 2022
Peter Porker, the Spectacular Spider-Ham (vol. 2)	#1–5	Zeb Wells	Will Robson	December 25, 2019
Phases of the Moon Knight	#1–4	Erica Schultz & Benjamin Percy	Manuel García & Rod Reis	August 28, 2024
Phoenix Song: Echo	#1–5	Rebecca Roanhorse	Luca Maresca	October 20, 2021
Planet Hulk: Worldbreaker	#1–5	Greg Pak	Aaron Lopresti	November 30, 2022
Power Man: Timeless	#1–5	Collin Kelly & Jackson Lanzing	Juann Cabal	February 5, 2025
Power Pack (vol. 4)	#1–5	Ryan North	Nico Leon	November 25, 2020
Power Pack: Into the Storm	#1–5	Louise Simonson	June Brigman	January 24, 2024
Powers of X	#1–6	Jonathan Hickman	R.B. Silva	July 31, 2019
Psylocke: Ninja	#1–5	Tim Seeley	Nico Leon	January 21, 2026
Punisher (vol. 13)	#1–12	Jason Aaron	Jesús Saiz & Paul Azaceta.	March 9, 2022
Punisher: Kill Krew	#1–5	Gerry Duggan	Juan Ferreyra	July 31, 2019
Punisher: Red Band	#1–5	Benjamin Percy	Julius Ohta	September 10, 2025
Ravencroft	#1–5	Frank Tieri	Angel Unzueta	January 29, 2020
Realm of X	#1–4	Torunn Grønbekk	Diógenes Neves	August 23, 2023
Reptil	#1–4	Terry Blas	Enid Balam	May 26, 2021
Resurrection of Magneto	#1–4	Al Ewing	Luciano Vecchio	January 24, 2024
Return of Wolverine	#1–5	Charles Soule	Steve McNiven	September 19, 2018
Revenge of the Cosmic Ghost Rider	#1–5	Dennis Hopeless & Donny Cates	Scott Hepburn & Geoff Shaw	December 18, 2019
Rise of the Powers of X	#1–5	Kieron Gillen	R.B. Silva	January 10, 2024
Rogue (vol. 4)	#1–5	Erica Schultz	Luigi Zagaria	January 21, 2026
Rogue & Gambit (vol. 2)	#1–5	Stephanie Phillips	Carlos Gomez	March 1, 2023
Rogue: The Savage Land	#1–5	Tim Seeley	Zulema Lavina	January 15, 2025
Sabretooth (vol. 4)	#1–5	Victor LaValle	Leonard Kirk	February 2, 2022
Sabretooth & the Exiles	#1–5	Victor LaValle	Leonard Kirk	November 9, 2022
Sabretooth: The Dead Don't Talk	#1–5	Frank Tieri	Michael Sta. Maria	December 18, 2024
Sai: Dimensional Rivals	#1–5	Peach Momoko, Iban Coello & Stan Sakai		January 14, 2026
Sam Wilson: Captain America	#1–5	Greg Pak & Evan Narcisse	Eder Messias & Valentine De Landro	January 1, 2025
Savage Spider-Man	#1–5	Joe Kelly	Gerado Sandoval	February 2, 2022
Scarlet Witch & Quicksilver	#1–4	Steve Orlando	Lorenzo Tammetta	February 14, 2024
Secret Invasion (vol. 2)	#1–5	Ryan North	Francesco Mobili	November 2, 2022
Sentinels	#1–5	Alex Paknadel	Justin Mason	October 9, 2024
Sentry (vol. 4)	#1–4	Jason Loo	Luigi Zagaria	December 6, 2023
Sentry (vol. 5)	#1–4	Paul Jenkins	Christian Rosado	March 18, 2026
Shang-Chi (vol. 1)	#1–5	Gene Luen Yang	Dike Ruan and Philip Tan	September 30, 2020
Shatterstar	#1–5	Tim Seeley	Carlos Villa	October 3, 2018
Silk (vol. 3)	#1–5	Maurene Goo	Takeshi Miyazawa	March 31, 2021
Silk (vol. 4)	#1–5	Emily Kim	Takeshi Miyazawa	January 19, 2022
Silk (vol. 5)	#1–5	Emily Kim	Ig Guara	May 10, 2023
Silver Surfer Rebirth	#1–5	Ron Marz	Ron Lim	January 19, 2022
Silver Surfer Rebirth: Legacy	#1–5	Ron Marz	Ron Lim	September 6, 2023
Silver Surfer: Black	#1–5	Donny Cates	Tradd Moore	July 3, 2019
Silver Surfer: Ghost Light	#1–5	John Jennings	Valentine De Landro	February 1, 2023
Sinister War	#1–4	Nick Spencer	Mark Bagley	July 14, 2021
Spider-Gwen: Gwenverse	#1–5	Tim Seeley	Jodi Nishijima	February 9, 2022
Spider-Gwen: Shadow Clones	#1–5	Emily Kim	Kei Zama	March 1, 2023
Spider-Gwen: Smash	#1–4	Melissa Flores	Enid Balám	December 14, 2023
Spider-Man '94	#1–5	J.M. DeMatteis	Jim Towe	September 3, 2025
Spider-Man (vol. 3)	#1–5	J. J. Abrams & Henry Abrams	Sara Pichelli	September 18, 2019
Spider-Man & Venom: Double Trouble	#1–4	Mariko Tamaki	Gurihiru	November 6, 2019
Spider-Man 2099: Dark Genesis	#1–5	Steve Orlando	Justin Mason	May 3, 2023
Spider-Man Noir (vol. 2)	#1–5	Margaret Stohl	Juan Ferreyra	March 4, 2020
Spider-Man Noir (vol. 3)	#1–5	Erik Larsen	Andrea Broccardo	October 1, 2025
Spider-Man: Black Suit & Blood	#1–4	J.M. DeMatteis, J. Michael Straczynski & Dustin Nguyen	Dustin Nguyen, Elena Casagrande & Sumit Kumar	August 7, 2024
Spider-Man: India	#1–5	Nikesh Sukla	Abishek Malsuni	June 14, 2023
Spider-Man: Life Story	#1–6; Annual #1	Chip Zdarsky	Mark Bagley	March 20, 2019
Spider-Man: Shadow of the Green Goblin	#1–4	J.M. Dematteis	Michael Sta. Maria	April 3, 2024
Spider-Man: Spider's Shadow	#1–5	Chip Zdarsky	Pasqual Ferry & Matthew Hollingsworth	April 14, 2021
Spider-Man: The Lost Hunt	#1–5	J.M. Dematteis	Eder Messias	November 9, 2022
Spider-Punk	#1–5	Cody Ziglar	Justin Mason	April 6, 2022
Spider-Punk: Arms Race	#1–4	Cody Ziglar	Justin Mason	February 28, 2024
Spider-Society	#1–4	Alex Segura	Scott Godlewski	August 14, 2024
Spider-Verse (vol. 3)	#1–6	Jed MacKay	Juan Frigeri	October 2, 2019
Spider-Verse vs. Venomverse	#1–5	Kyle Higgins & Mat Groom	Luciano Vecchio	May 14, 2025
Spine-Tingling Spider-Man	#1–4	Salamid Ahmed	Juan Ferreyra	October 18, 2023
Spirits of Violence	#1–5	Sabir Pirzada	Paul Davidson	October 1, 2025
Star	#1–5	Kelly Thompson	Javier Pina	January 8, 2020
Storm (vol. 4)	#1–5	Ann Nocenti	Sid Kotian	May 24, 2023
Storm: Earth's Mightiest Mutant	#1–5	Murewa Ayodele	Federica Mancin	February 4, 2026
Strange Tales (vol. 6)	#1–4	Jeremy Whitley	Bayleigh Underwood	October 8, 2025
Symbiote Spider-Man	#1–5	Peter David	Greg Land	April 10, 2019
Symbiote Spider-Man 2099	#1–5	Peter David	Rogê Antônio	March 13, 2024
Symbiote Spider-Man: Alien Reality	#1–5	Peter David	Greg Land	December 11, 2019
Symbiote Spider-Man: Crossroads	#1–5	Peter David	Greg Land	July 28, 2021
Tarot	#1–4	Alan Davis	Paul Renaud	January 1, 2020
Taskmaster (vol. 3)	#1–5	Jed MacKay	Alessandro Vitti	November 11, 2020
Thanos (vol. 3)	#1–6	Tini Howard	Ariel Olivetti	April 24, 2019
Thanos (vol. 4)	#1–4	Christopher Cantwell	Luca Pizzari	November 8, 2023
The End 2099	#1–5	Steve Orlando	Ibraim Roberson	December 10, 2025
The Life of Captain Marvel (vol. 2)	#1–5	Margaret Stohl	Carlos Pacheco	July 18, 2018
The Mighty Valkyries	#1–5	Jason Aaron & Torunn Grønbekk	Mattia de lulis	April 21, 2021
The Thing (vol. 3)	#1–6	Walter Mosley	Tom Reilly	November 10, 2021
The Thing (vol. 4)	#1–5	Tony Fleecs	Leonard Kirk	May 21, 2025
The Union	#1–5	Paul Grist	Andrea Di Vito	December 2, 2020
The United States of Captain America	#1–5	Christopher Cantwell & Josh Trujillo	Dale Eaglesham & Jan Bazaldua	June 30, 2021
The Variants	#1–5	Gail Simone	Phil Noto	June 22, 2022
The Vision and the Scarlet Witch (vol. 2)	#1–5	Steve Orlando	Lorenzo Tammetta	May 21, 2025
The X-Cellent (vol. 1)	#1–5	Peter Milligan	Michael Allred & Laura Allred	February 2, 2022
The X-Cellent (vol. 2)	#1–5	Peter Milligan	Michael Allred & Laura Allred	March 15, 2023
Thor & Loki: Double Trouble	#1–4	Mariko Tamaki	Gurihiru	March 10, 2021
Thunderbolts (vol 4)	#1–5	Jim Zub	Sean Izaakse	August 31, 2022
Thunderbolts (vol 5)	#1–4	Collin Kelly and Jackson Lanzing	Geraldo Borges	December 6, 2023
Tiger Division	#1–5	Emily Kim	Crees Lee	November 2, 2022
TVA	#1–5	Kathryn Blair	Pere Perez	December 18, 2024
U.S. Agent (vol. 3)	#1–5	Christopher Priest	Stefano Landini	November 4, 2020
Ultimate Endgame	#1–5	Deniz Camp	Jonas Scharf & Terry Dodson	December 31, 2025
Ultimate Invasion	#1–4	Jonathan Hickman	Bryan Hitch	June 21, 2023
Ultimate Spider-Man: Incursion	#1–5	Deniz Camp & Cody Ziglar	Jonas Scharf	June 4, 2025
Uncanny Avengers (vol. 4)	#1–5	Gerry Duggan	Javier Garrón	August 16, 2023
Uncanny Spider-Man	#1–5	Si Spurrier	Lee Garbett	September 6, 2023
The Undead Iron Fist	#1–4	Jason Loo	Fran Galán	September 10, 2025
Venom: Black, White & Blood	#1–4	Various		August 20, 2025
Venom: First Host	#1–5	Mike Costa	Mark Bagley	August 29, 2018
Venom: Lethal Protector (vol. 2)	#1–5	David Michelinie	Ivan Fiorelli	March 23, 2022
Venom: Lethal Protector II	#1–5	David Michelinie	Farid Karami	March 29, 2023
Venom: Separation Anxiety	#1–5	David Michelinie	Gerado Sandoval	May 15, 2024
W.E.B. of Spider-Man	#1–5	Kevin Shinick	Roberto Di Salvo	June 9, 2021
Wakanda	#1–5	Stephanie Williams & Evan Narcisse	Paco Medina & Natacha Bustos	October 12, 2022
Warlock: Rebirth	#1–5	Ron Marz	Ron Lim	April 19, 2023
Wasp	#1–4	Al Ewing	Kasia Nie	January 18, 2023
Weapon X-Men (vol. 1)	#1–4	Christos Gage	Yildiray Çinar	March 6, 2024
Weapon X-Men (vol. 2)	#1–5	Joe Casey	ChrisCross	February 19, 2025
Web of Black Widow	#1–5	Jody Houser	Stephen Mooney	September 4, 2019
Werewolf by Night (vol. 3)	#1–4	Taboo	Benjamin Jackendoff	October 21, 2020
What If?... Miles Morales	#1–5	Cody Ziglar	Paco Medina	March 2, 2022
What If?... Venom	#1–5	Jeremy Holt	Jesús Hervás	February 28, 2024
White Widow	#1–4	Sarah Gailey	Alessandro Miracolo	November 1, 2023
Wiccan: Witches' Road	#1–5	Wyatt Kennedy	Andy Pereira	December 3, 2025
Winter Guard	#1–4	Ryan Cady	Jan Bazaldua	August 25, 2021
Winter Soldier (vol. 2)	#1–5	Kyle Higgins	Rod Reis	December 5, 2018
Wolverine and Kitty Pryde (vol. 2)	#1–5	Chris Claremont	Damian Couceiro	April 30, 2025
Wolverine: Black, White & Blood	#1–4	Various		November 4, 2020
Wolverine: Infinity Watch	#1–5	Gerry Duggan	Andy MacDonald	February 20, 2019
Wolverine: Madripoor Knights	#1–5	Chris Claremont	Edgar Salazar	February 7, 2024
Wolverine: Patch	#1–5	Larry Hama	Andrea Di Vito	March 16, 2022
Wolverine: Revenge	#1–5	Jonathan Hickman	Greg Capullo	August 21, 2024
Wolverine: The Long Night	#1–5	Benjamin Percy	Marcio Takara	January 2, 2019
Wolverine: Weapons of Armageddon	#1–4	Chip Zdarsky	Luca Maresca	February 18, 2026
Wolverines & Deadpools	#1–3	Cody Ziglar	Rogê Antônio	July 2, 2025
Wonder Man	#1–5	Gerry Duggan	Mark Buckingham	March 18, 2026
X Deaths of Wolverine	#1–5	Benjamin Percy	Joshua Cassara & Federico Vicentini	January 12, 2022
X Lives of Wolverine	#1–5	Benjamin Percy	Joshua Cassara & Federico Vicentini	January 5, 2022
X-23: Deadly Regenesis	#1–5	Erica Schultz	Edgar Salazar	March 8, 2023
X-Men '92: House of XCII	#1–5	Steve Foxe	Salva Espin	April 6, 2022
X-Men '97	#1–4	Steve Foxe	Salva Espin	March 27, 2024
X-Men of Apoclaypse	#1–4	Jeph Loeb	Simone Di Meo	November 19, 2025
X-Men Unlimited: X-Men Green	#1–2	Gerry Duggan	Emilio Laiso	May 18, 2022
X-Men: Forever	#1–4	Kieron Gillen	Luca Maresca	March 20, 2024
X-Men: Grand Design – Second Genesis	#1–2	Ed Piskor		July 25, 2018
X-Men: Grand Design – X-Tinction	#1–2	Ed Piskor		May 29, 2019
X-Men: Heir of Apocalypse	#1–4	Steve Foxe	Netho Diaz	June 5, 2024
X-Men: The Trial of Magneto	#1–5	Leah Williams	Lucas Werneck	August 18, 2021
X-Men/Fantastic Four (vol. 2)	#1–4	Chip Zdarsky	Terry Dodson & Rachel Dodson	February 5, 2020
X-Terminators (vol. 2)	#1–5	Leah Williams	Carlos Gómez	July 6, 2022
X-Treme X-Men (vol. 3)	#1–5	Chris Claremont	Salvador Larroca	November 30, 2022
Yondu	#1–5	Lonnie Nadler & Zac Thompson	John McCrea	November 6, 2019
Your Friendly Neighborhood Spider-Man	#1–5	Christos Gage	Eric Gapstur	December 11, 2024

=== Digital originals ===
Digital comics, first released as miniseries on Marvel Unlimited, and then collected as printed trade paperbacks.

Title	Issues	Writer	Artist	Debut Date	Printed Release
Cloak and Dagger: Shades of Gray	#1–3	Dennis Hopeless	David Messina	June 6, 2018	December 12, 2018
Cloak and Dagger: Negative Exposure	#1–3	Dennis Hopeless	Francisco Manna	December 26, 2018	March 27, 2019
Daughters of the Dragon: Deep Cuts	#1–3	Jed MacKay	Travel Foreman	November 14, 2018	February 13, 2019
Iron Fist: Phantom Limb	#1–3	Clay McLeod Chapman	Guillermo Sanna	October 3, 2018	January 2, 2019
Jessica Jones: Blind Spot	#1–3	Kelly Thompson	Mattia de Lulis	July 18, 2018	October 31, 2018
Jessica Jones: Purple Daughter	#1–3	Kelly Thompson	Mattia de Lulis	January 16, 2019	April 24, 2019
Luke Cage: Everyman	#1–3	Anthony Del Col	Jahnoy Lindsay	August 15, 2018	November 14, 2018

=== Infinity Comics ===
Infinity Comics are weekly stories told in an unpaginated vertical format exclusively released on Marvel Unlimited.

Title		Issues	Writer	Artist	Debut Date
Alligator Loki		#1–12	Alyssa Wong	Robert Quinn & Pete Pantazis	March 11, 2022
Amazing Fantasy Prelude		#1	Kaare Andrews		September 9, 2021
Astonishing Avengers		#1–	Alex Paknadel & Tim Seeley	Phillip Sevy	January 2025
Astonishing Spider-Man		#1–	Scott Aukerman	Salva Espin & Julian Shaw	October 17, 2024
Astonishing X-Men		#1–	Steve Orlando	Francesco Archidiacono	December 2024
Avengers Academy: Marvel's Voices		#1–	Anthony Oliveira	Carola Borelli	June 26, 2024
Avengers Forever		#1–4	Jason Aaron	Kev Walker & Dean White	March 23, 2022
Avengers Unlimited	Black Ledger	#1–6	David Pepose	Farid Karami	July 12, 2022
Avengers Unlimited	A Whole New World	#7–8	Jeremy Adams	Stefano Raffaele	August 16, 2022
Avengers Unlimited	The Kaiju War	#9–13	Murewa Ayodele	Akande Adedotun	August 30, 2022
Avengers Unlimited	Minding the Mansion	#14	Jim Zub	Leonardo Romero	October 3, 2022
Avengers Unlimited	Righteous Revenge	#15–16	Jim Zub	Enid Balam	October 11, 2022
Avengers Unlimited	Sabotage	#17–18	Jeremy Adams	Dante Bastianoni	October 25, 2022
Avengers Unlimited	Riptide	#19–20	Tochi Onyebuchi	Ray-Anthony Height	November 8, 2022
Avengers Unlimited	The Doomsday Man	#21–24	Patrick Zircher		November 22, 2022
Avengers Unlimited	She-Hulk: Home for the Holidays	#25	Ryan North	Javier Rodríguez	December 20, 2022
Avengers Unlimited	Midwest, Not Mid-Best	#26	Kyle Starks	David Baldeón	December 27, 2022
Avengers Unlimited	Key To A Mystery	#27–31	Jim Zub	Mike Bowden & Oren Junior	January 3, 2023
Avengers Unlimited	Darkness at the Edge of Town	#33–36	Alex Segura	Jim Towe	February 14, 2023
Avengers Unlimited	Rock and Troll!	#37	Tom DeFalco	Ron Frenz & Brett Breeding	March 14, 2023
Avengers Unlimited	If You Knew Uru...	#38	Tom DeFalco	Ron Frenz & Brett Breeding	March 21, 2023
Avengers Unlimited	In Too Deep	#39–42	Eve Ewing	Luciano Vecchio	March 28, 2023
Avengers Unlimited	Casino Andromeda	#43–48	David Pepose	Ze Carlos	April 25, 2023
Avengers Unlimited	Rick Jones' Locker	#49–51	Jeremy Adams	Alan Robinson	June 6, 2023
Avengers Unlimited	Civil Score	#52–54	Jeremy Adams	Patch Zircher	June 27, 2023
Avengers Unlimited	Helled Into Account	#55–57	Sean McKeever	David Baldeón	July 18, 2023
Avengers Unlimited	Asgard Confidential	#58–59	Kalinda Vazquez	Alba Glez & Walden Wong	August 8, 2023
Avengers Unlimited	Wishing on Stars	#60–62	Tim Seeley	Davide Tinto	August 22, 2023
Avengers Unlimited	Systemic Approach	#63–65	Matthew Groom	Caio Majado	September 12, 2023
Avengers United		#1–25	Derek Landy	Marcio Fiorito	October 12, 2023
Avengers: Electric Rain		#1	Young Koon Ko & Amy Chu	Young Koon Ko	November 2, 2022
Beastly Buddies		#1–6	Steve Foxe	Armand Bodnar	October 18, 2024
Black Panther: Who is the Black Panther?		#1-12	Reginald Hudlin	John Romita Jr.	October 27, 2022
Black Widow		#1	Mark Russell	Anny Maulina & Irma Kniivila	September 9, 2021
Blade: First Bite		#1-4	Bryan Edward Hill	Mack Chater	June 28, 2023
Brute Force		#1–6	Paul Scheer & Nick Giovannetti	Geoffo & Dee Cunniffe	July 7, 2023
Captain America		#1–4	Jay Edidin	Nico Leon	September 9, 2021
Catpool		#1	Mackenzie Cadenhead	Fernando Sifuentes & Enid Balám	July 30, 2024
Cosmo the Spacedog		#1–6	Jason Loo	David Cutler	May 5, 2023
Deadpool: Invisible Touch		#1–5	Gerry Duggan	Lucas Werneck	September 30, 2021
Deadpool Vs. Wolverine: Slash 'Em Up		#1-6	Christos Gage	Alan Robinson	June 18, 2024
Devil Dinosaur		#1–4	Stephen Byrne	Arianna Florean	January 27, 2023
Dogpool		#1–6	Mackenzie Cadenhead	Enid Balám	July 26, 2024
Dogpool Team-Up		#1	Mackenzie Cadenhead	Enid Balám	August 1, 2024
Doodlepool		#1	Nicky Nicotera		September 30, 2024
Edge of Venomverse		#1–12	Clay McLeod Chapman	Phillip Sevy, Gustavo Duarte, Dax Gordine, and Nathan Stockman.	June 13, 2023
Eternals: The 500 Year War		#1–7	Dan Abnett, Aki Yanagi, Jongmin Shin, Ju-Yeon Park, David Macho, Rafael Scavone & Yifan Jiang	Geoffo, Rickie Yagawa, Do Gyun Kim, Magda Price, Marcio Fiorito & Gunji	January 12, 2022
Fantastic Four		#1–4	Zac Gorman	Stefano Landini	November 9, 2021
Ghost Rider: Kushala		#1–8	Taboo and B. Earl	Guillermo Sana, Vanessa Del Rey & Jordie Bellaire	October 7, 2021
Giant Size Little Marvels		#1–8	Skottie Young	Dax Gordine	September 9, 2021
House of Harkness		#1–15	Preeti Chhibber	Jodi Nishijima	August 28, 2024
Hulkling & Wiccan		#1–4	Josh Trujillo	Jodi Nishijima	November 1, 2021
I Am Groot		#1-6	Chiya Toriko		September 8, 2023
Infinite Possibilities		#1	Geoffo	Stephen Wacker	January 5, 2022
Infinity Paws		#1–10	Jason Loo	Nao Fuji	April 5, 2024
It's Jeff!	Season One	#1–12	Kelly Thompson	Gurihiru	September 9, 2021
It's Jeff!	Season Two	#13–24	Kelly Thompson	Gurihiru	September 9, 2022
It's Jeff!	Season Three	#25–	Kelly Thompson	Gurihiru	October 20, 2023
Jeff Week		#1-5	Gustavo Duarte		September 23, 2024
Kid Juggernaut: Marvel Voices		#1–6	Emily Kim	Minkyu Jung	May 15, 2024
Life of Wolverine		#1–12	Jim Zub	Ramon Bachs & Java Tartaglia	January 20, 2022
Li'l Rocket		#1–6	Stephanie Renee Williams	Jay Fosgitt	April 10, 2023
The Lovable Lockheed		#1-6	Nathan Stockman	Triona Farrell	September 6, 2024
Love Unlimited	Ms. Marvel & Red Dagger	#1–6	Nadia Shammas	Natacha Bustos	June 9, 2022
Love Unlimited	Viv Vision	#7–12	Marieke Nijkamp	Federico Sabbatini	July 21, 2022
Love Unlimited	Millie the Spy	#13–18	Stephanie Phillips	Nick Roche	September 1, 2022
Love Unlimited	X Loves of Wolverine	#19–24	Sean McKeever	Diogenes Neves	October 13, 2022
Love Unlimited	Hulking & Wiccan	#25–30	Josh Trujillo	tokitokoro	November 24, 2022
Love Unlimited	Karma in Love	#31–36	Trung Le Nguyen		January 5, 2023
Love Unlimited	Deadpool Loves the Marvel Universe	#37–42	Fabian Nicieza	Salva Espin	February 14, 2023
Love Unlimited	Gwenpool	#43–48	Jeremy Whitley	Bailie Rosenlund	March 30, 2023
Love Unlimited	Aaron Fischer - Captain America	#49–54	Josh Trujillo	Cara McGee	May 11, 2023
Love Unlimited	Captain Marvel and War Machine	#55–60	Sean McKeever	Lorenzo Susi	June 22, 2023
Love Unlimited	Rogue & Gambit	#61–66	Preeti Chhibber	Carola Borelli	August 3, 2023
Love Unlimited	Spider-Man	#67–72	Magdalene Visaggio	Derek Charm & Rico Renzi	September 14, 2023
Lucky the Pizza Dog		#1	Jason Loo		November 24, 2021
Marvel Fairy Tales		#1–4	Ryan North	Jay Fosgitt, Dax Gordine & Gustavo Duarte	February 17, 2022
Marvel Meow		#1–	Nao Fuji		March 4, 2022
Marvel Meow & Pizza Dog		#1–4	Jason Loo		March 24, 2023
Marvel Mutts		#1–6	Mackenzie Cadenhead	Takeshi Miyazawa & Raúl Angulo	December 1, 2023
Marvel Rivals		#1-	Paul Allor	Dee Cunniffe & Luca Claretti	December 16, 2024
Marvel's Voices	Iceman	#1–4	Luciano Vecchio		June 1, 2022
Marvel's Voices	Young Avengers	#5–10	Anthony Oliveira	Jethro Morales & Dijjo Lima	June 29, 2022
Marvel's Voices	Amadeus Cho	#11	John Tsuei	Lynne Yoshii	August 10, 2022
Marvel's Voices	America Chavez	#12–17	Juan Ponce	Alba Glez	August 17, 2022
Marvel's Voices	Miles Morales	#18	Mohale Mashigo	Julian Shaw	September 28, 2022
Marvel's Voices	Werewolf by Night	#19	Owl Goingback	Alison Sampson	October 5, 2022
Marvel's Voices	Nova	#20–25	Terry Bias	Bruno Oliveira	October 12, 2022
Marvel's Voices	Black Panther	#26	Cheryl Lynn Eaton	Nelson Daniel	November 24, 2022
Marvel's Voices	The Family Snikt	#27–32	Stephanie Renee Williams	Alan Robinson	November 30, 2022
Marvel's Voices	Crescent & Io	#33–36	Danny Ko	Jodi Nishijima	November 30, 2022
Marvel's Voices	Reptil	#37	Daniel José Older	Michael Shelfer	January 25, 2023
Marvel's Voices	Moon Girl	#38–43	Stephanie Williams	Julian Shaw	February 1, 2023
Marvel's Voices	Negasonic Teenage Warhead	#44-49	Andrew Wheeler	Carola Borelli	March 15, 2023
Marvel's Voices	Wave	#50	Greg Pak	Luigi Teruel	April 26, 2023
Marvel's Voices	Iron Fist Pei - Wayward Warrior	#51–56	Jeremy Holt	Guillermo Sanna	May 3, 2023
Marvel's Voices	Ayo & Aneka	#57	Wyatt Kennedy	Sumeyye Kesgi & KJ Díaz	June 14, 2023
Marvel's Voices	Runaways	#58–63	Terry Blas	Bruno Oliveira	June 21, 2023
Marvel's Voices	Echo - Dream Descent	#64–69	Melissa Flores	Kyle Charles	August 16, 2023
Marvel's Voices	Miles Morales	#70	David Betancourt	Alba Glez	September 27, 2023
Marvel's Voices	Nightshade	#71–74	Stephanie Williams	Hector Barros	October 4, 2023
Marvel's Voices	Loki Presents Bifrost and Furious	#75 & 84	Karla Pacheco	Roberta Ingranata	November 1, 2023
Marvel's Voices	Spider-Man India and Black Cat	#76–77	Preeti Chhibber	Alti Firmansyah	November 8, 2023
Marvel's Voices	White Tiger and Kraven the Hunter	#78–79	Alex Segura	Alba Glez	November 22, 2023
Marvel's Voices	Misty Knight and the Prowler	#80–81	J. Holtham	Julian Shaw	December 6, 2023
Marvel's Voices	Terrax the Tamer and Shang-Chi	#82-83	Jason Loo	Rickie Yagawa	December 20, 2023
Marvel's Voices	A-Force	#85–94	Cheryl Lynn Eaton	Federica Mancin	January 3, 2024
Marvel's Voices	Unlike Any Other	#95–100	Anthony Oliveira	Bailie Rosenlund	April 3, 2024
Mighty Marvel Holiday Special	Ghost Ridin' to Love	#1	Jason Loo	Lebeau Underwood	February 14, 2022
Mighty Marvel Holiday Special	Happy Holidays, Mr. Howlett	#1	Ryan North	Nathan Stockman	December 16, 2021
Mighty Marvel Holiday Special	Halloween with the Rhino	#1	Ryan North	Tom Reilly	October 29, 2021
Mighty Marvel Holiday Special	Iceman's New Year's Resolutions	#1	Luciano Vecchio		December 31, 2021
Mighty Marvel Holiday Special	Year of the Wong	#1	Amy Chu	E. J. Su	February 1, 2022
Ms. Marvel: Bottled Up		#1	Samira Ahmed	Ramon Bachs	May 31, 2022
Mousepool		#1	Mackenzie Cadenhead	Fernando Sifuentes & Enid Balám	July 30, 2024
Patsy Walker		#1–4	Trina Robbins	Derek Charm	May 12, 2022
Savage Wolverine		#1-8	Tom Parkinson-Morgan	Javier Tartaglia & Dev Pramanik	August 7, 2024
Shang-Chi		#1-4	Alyssa Wong	Nathan Stockman	September 9, 2021
Spider-Bot		#1–12	Jordan Blum	Alberto Alburquerque	December 3, 2021
Spider-Man Unlimited		#1–12	Christos Gage	Simone Buonfantino & Fer Sifuentes	September 5, 2023
Spider-Verse Unlimited		#1–20	Anthony Piper	Bruno Oliveira & Pete Pantazis	March 16, 2022
Spine-Tingling Spider-Man		#1–8	Saladin Ahmed	Juan Ferreyra	October 26, 2021
Squirrel Girl: The Unbeatable Radio Show!		#1	Ryan North	Derek Charm & Rico Renzi	April 18, 2022
Strange Tales	Clea, Wong & America	#1	Al Ewing	Ramon Bachs & Javier Tartaglia	May 7, 2022
Strange Tales	Ghost Rider	#1	Rich Douek	Ramon Bachs & Javier Tartaglia	October 26, 2022
Strange Tales	Rocket Raccoon	#1	Al Ewing	Ramon Bachs & Javier Tartaglia	November 28, 2022
Strange Tales	She-Hulk	#1	Steve Foxe	Ramon Bachs & Javier Tartaglia	August 17, 2022
Strange Tales	Thor & Jane Foster	#1	Tim Seeley	Ramon Bachs & Javier Tartaglia	July 6, 2022
Strange Tales	Victor Strange	#1	Al Ewing	Ramon Bachs & Javier Tartaglia	June 15, 2022
Strange Tales	Wakanda	#1	Jason Holtham	Ramon Bachs & Javier Tartaglia	November 2, 2022
Strange Tales	Secret Invasion	#1	Jim Zub	Mark Basso	June 22, 2023
T.E.S.T. Kitchen		#1–4	Paul Eschbach	E. J. Su	August 8, 2022
T.E.S.T. Kitchen	Halloween Special	#1	Paul Eschbach	E. J. Su	October 31, 2022
T.E.S.T. Kitchen	Holiday Special	#1	Paul Eschbach	E. J. Su	December 24, 2022
T.E.S.T. Kitchen	Thanksgiving Special	#1	Paul Eschbach	E. J. Su	November 21, 2022
Venom/Carnage		#1–4	Karla Pacheco	Scott Hepburn & Ian Herring	September 22, 2021
Venom: Original Sin		#1–8	Steve Orlando	Scott Koblish	September 10, 2024
White Fox		#1–4	Alyssa Wong	Bruno Oliveira	April 6, 2022
Who is...	America Chavez	#1	Alex Segura	Carlos Gomez	April 18, 2022
Who is...	The Scarlet Witch	#1	Steve Orlando	Rye Hickman	April 18, 2022
Who is...	Jane Foster: Thor	#1	Torunn Grønbekk	Leonard Kirk	June 23, 2022
Who is...	She-Hulk	#1	Rainbow Rowell	Ig Guara	August 4, 2022
Who is...	Daredevil	#1	Ralph Macchio	Damian Couceiro	October 6, 2022
Who is...	Ironheart	#1	Eve Ewing	David Cutler	October 31, 2022
Who is...	Namor	#1	Ralph Macchio	Matt Horak	October 31, 2022
Who is...	A Flerken	#1	Jason Loo		November 10, 2023
Who is...	Monica Rambeau	#1	Cheryl Lynn Eaton	Alan Robinson	November 10, 2023
Who is...	Ms. Marvel	#1	Alex Segura	Noemi Vettori	November 10, 2023
Who is...	Kingpin	#1	Rich Douek	Damian Couceiro	January 5, 2024
Who is...	Kang	#1	Mark Basso		January 25, 2023
Who is...	M.O.D.O.K	#1	Jordan Blum	Damian Courciro	February 17, 2023
Who is...	Miracleman	#1	Ram V	Leonard Kirk	February 8, 2023
Who is...	Moon Girl	#1	Mohale Mashigo	Carlos Lopez & Jethro Morales	February 8, 2023
Who is...	Adam Warlock	#1	Ralph Macchio	Ruth Redmond & Damian Couceiro	May 5, 2023
Who is...	Kraven	#1	J.M. DeMatteis	Andrea Di Vito	October 20, 2023
X-Men: From the Ashes		#1–25	Alex Paknadel	Diogenes Neves	June 5, 2024
X-Men: Hellfire Gala Confessionals		#1	Steve Foxe	Alan Robinson	August 29, 2022
X-Men: Hellfire Last Rites		#1	Steve Foxe	Jim Towe	August 15, 2023
X-Men Unlimited	Latitude	#1–4	Jonathan Hickman	Declan Shalvey	September 9, 2021
X-Men Unlimited	X-Men Green	#5–12	Gerry Duggan	Emilio Laiso	September 27, 2021
X-Men Unlimited	X-Men Green	#29–33	Karla Pacheco	Emilio Laiso	April 4, 2022
X-Men Unlimited	X-Men Green	#44–49	Steve Orlando	Emilio Laiso	July 18, 2022
X-Men Unlimited	X-Men Green	#68–73	Steve Orlando	Emilio Laiso	January 2, 2023
X-Men Unlimited	X-Men Green	#86–91	Steve Orlando	Emilio Laiso	May 8, 2023
X-Men Unlimited	Paradise Lost	#13–20	Fabian Nicieza	Matt Horak	December 6, 2021
X-Men Unlimited	Downtime	#21, 27, 34	Jason Loo		February 7, 2022
X-Men Unlimited	Longitude	#22–25	Declan Shalvey		February 14, 2022
X-Men Unlimited	A Paddy's Day Yarn	#26	Declan Shalvey	Nick Roche	March 14, 2022
X-Men Unlimited	So I'm Dating a Pop Star!	#28	Jason Loo	E. J. Su	March 28, 2022
X-Men Unlimited	Eany Come Home	#35–40	Alex Paknadel	Julian Shaw	May 16, 2022
X-Men Unlimited	Birthday Side Quest	#41	Jason Loo		June 27, 2022
X-Men Unlimited	Cypher in The Cryptolect	#42–43	Alex Paknadel	Damian Couceiro	July 4, 2022
X-Men Unlimited	Secret X-Men 2022	#50–55	Steve Foxe	Alan Robinson	August 29, 2022
X-Men Unlimited	Ex-Friends	#56–58	Jason Loo		October 17, 2022
X-Men Unlimited	The Fall of the House of X	#59	Alex Paknadel	Nick Roche	October 31, 2022
X-Men Unlimited	In The Dark	#60–61	Torunn Grønbekk	Phillip Sevy	November 7, 2022
X-Men Unlimited	A World Without X	#62–67	Jordan Blum	Salva Espin	November 28, 2022
X-Men Unlimited	Et Tu, Crouton?	#74	Leah Williams	Bruno Oliveira	February 13, 2023
X-Men Unlimited	Unbreakable	#75–79	Zac Thompson	Phillip Sevy	February 20, 2023
X-Men Unlimited	Unofficial X-Men	#80–85	Grace Freud	Alberto Alburquerque	March 27, 2023
X-Men Unlimited	Madrox Family & Fantastic Four Team-Up	#92–95	Jason Loo		June 19, 2023
X-Men Unlimited	Control	#96–99	Alex Segura	Alberto Alburquerque	July 17, 2023
X-Men Unlimited	X-Men Vote Candidates	#100–105	Steve Foxe & Stephanie Williams	Noemi Vettori	August 14, 2023
X-Men Unlimited	The Redroot Saga	#106–111	Steve Foxe & Steve Orlando	Lynne Yoshii	September 25, 2023
X-Men Unlimited	Firestar, Agent of Orchis	#112–117	Steve Foxe & Steve Orlando	Guillermo Sanna	November 6, 2023
X-Men Unlimited	Red Winter Sun	#118–120	Steve Foxe & Steve Orlando	Phillip Sevy	December 18, 2023
X-Men Unlimited	The External Threat	#121–140	Steve Foxe & Steve Orlando	Nick Roche	January 15, 2024
Ziggy Pig and Silly Seal		#1–8	Frank Tieri, John Cerilli	Jacob Chabat	August 19, 2022

=== Gamerverse ===
Title	Issues	Writer	Artist	Published
Marvel's Avengers: Black Widow	#1	Christos Gage	Michele Bandini	March 25, 2020
Marvel's Avengers: Captain America	#1	Paul Allor	Georges Jeanty	March 18, 2020
Marvel's Avengers: Iron Man	#1	Jim Zub	Paco Diaz	December 11, 2019
Marvel's Avengers: Hulk	#1	Jim Zub	Ariel Olivetti	February 5, 2020
Marvel's Avengers: Thor	#1	Jim Zub	Robert Gill	January 8, 2020
Marvel's Spider-Man: The Black Cat Strikes	#1–5	Dennis Hopeless	Luca Maresca	January 15, 2020
Marvel's Spider-Man: City at War	#1–6	Dennis Hopeless	Michele Bandini	March 20, 2019
Marvel's Spider-Man: Velocity	#1–5	Dennis Hopeless	Emilio Laiso	August 28, 2019

=== One-shot series ===
Title	Writer	Artist	Published
Acts of Evil
Ms. Marvel Annual	Magdalene Visaggio	Jon Lim	July 3, 2019
Punisher Annual	Karla Pacheco	Adam Gorham	July 17, 2019
Venom Annual	Ryan Cady	Simone Di Meo	July 31, 2019
Deadpool Annual	Dana Schwartz	Reilly Brown	August 14, 2019
She-Hulk Annual	Alexandra Petri	Andy MacDonald	August 28, 2019
Ghost Spider Annual	Vita Ayala	Pere Perez	September 4, 2019
Moon Knight Annual	Cullen Bunn	Ibrahim Moustafa	September 11, 2019
Wolverine Annual	Jody Houser	Geraldo Borges	September 18, 2019
Contest of Chaos
Scarlet Witch Annual	Steve Orlando	Carlos Nieto	June 21, 2023
Spider-Man Annual	Stephanie Philips	Alberto Foche	August 9, 2023
Iron Man Annual	Jason Loo & Stephanie Philips	David Cutler & Alberto Foche	August 16, 2023
Fantastic Four Annual	Zac Gorman & Stephanie Philips	Alan Robinson & Alberto Foche	August 23, 2023
Moon Knight Annual	Jed Mackay & Stephanie Philips	Crees Lee & Alberto Foche	August 30, 2023
Spider-Gwen Annual	Karla Pacheco & Stephanie Phillips	Rosi Kämpe & Alberto Foche	September 6, 2023
Venom Annual	Alyssa Wong & Stephanie Phillips	Sergio Dávila & Alberto Foche	September 13, 2023
X-Men Annual	Paul Allor & Stephanie Phillips	Alessandro Miracolo & Alberto Foche	September 20, 2023
Avengers Annual	Stephanie Phillips	Alberto Foche	September 27, 2023
Curse of the Man-Thing
Avengers: Curse of the Man-Thing	Steve Orlando	Francesco Mobili	March 31, 2021
Spider-Man: Curse of the Man-Thing	Steve Orlando	Alberto Foche	April 28, 2021
X-Men: Curse of the Man-Thing	Steve Orlando	Andrea Broccardo	May 5, 2021
Demon Days
Demon Days: X-Men	Peach Momoko		March 3, 2021
Demon Days: Mariko	Peach Momoko		June 16, 2021
Demon Days: Cursed Web	Peach Momoko		September 1, 2021
Demon Days: Rising Storm	Peach Momoko		December 1, 2021
Demon Days: X-Men Creator's Cut	Peach Momoko		December 8, 2021
Demon Days: Blood Feud	Peach Momoko		March 23, 2022
Demon Wars
Demon Wars: Iron Samurai	Peach Momoko		July 13, 2022
Demon Wars: Shield of Justice	Peach Momoko		November 11, 2022
Demon Wars: Down in Flames	Peach Momoko		February 1, 2023
Demon Wars: Scarlet Sin	Peach Momoko		May 3, 2023
Giant-Size
Giant-Size Spider-Man	Cody Ziglar	Iban Coello	January 10, 2024
Giant-Size Fantastic Four	Fabian Nicieza	Creees Lee	February 28, 2024
Giant-Size Spider-Gwen	Melissa Flores	Alba Glez	March 6, 2024
Giant-Size Hulk	Phillip Kennedy Johnson	Andrea Broccardo	April 17, 2024
Giant-Size X-Men	Ann Nocenti	Lee Ferguson	May 8, 2024
Giant-Size Daredevil	Saladin Ahmed	Paul Davidson	June 12, 2024
Giant-Size Silver Surfer	Mat Groom	Tommaso Bianchi	July 10, 2024
Giant-Size Thor	Al Ewing	Brian Level	August 21, 2024
Giant-Size X-Men
Giant-Size X-Men: Jean Grey and Emma Frost	Jonathan Hickman	Russell Dauterman & Matt Wilson	February 26, 2020
Giant-Size X-Men: Nightcrawler	Jonathan Hickman	Alan Davis	March 25, 2020
Giant-Size X-Men: Magneto	Jonathan Hickman	Ben Oliver	July 15, 2020
Giant-Size X-Men: Fantomex	Jonathan Hickman	Rod Reis	August 5, 2020
Giant-Size X-Men: Storm	Jonathan Hickman	Russell Dauterman & Matt Wilson	September 16, 2020
Giant-Size X-Men: Thunderbird	Nyla Rose & Steve Orlando	David Cutler	May 4, 2022
Infinite Destinies
Iron Man Annual	Jed MacKay	Ibraim Roberson	June 2, 2021
Captain America Annual	Gerry Duggan	Marco Castiello	June 16, 2021
Black Cat Annual	Jed MacKay	Joey Vazquez	June 30, 2021
Amazing Spider-Man Annual (#2)	Karla Pacheco	Eleonora Carlini	July 7, 2021
Thor Annual	Aaron Kuder		July 21, 2021
Guardians of the Galaxy Annual	Al Ewing & Jed Mackay	Flaviano & Juan Ferreyra	August 4, 2021
Miles Morales: Spider-Man Annual	Saladin Ahmed & Jed Mackay	Luca Maresca & Juan Ferreyra	August 18, 2021
Avengers Annual	Jed Mackay	Travel Foreman	August 25, 2021
Infinity Watch
Thanos Annual	Derek Landy	Salvador Larroca & Sara Pichelli	June 26, 2024
Amazing Spider-Man Annual	Derek Landy	Ron Lim & Sara Pichelli	July 3, 2024
Immortal Thor Annual	Al Ewing	David Baldeón & Sara Pichelli	July 17, 2024
Ms. Marvel Annual	Iman Vellani & Sabir Pirzada	Giada Belviso & Sara Pichelli	July 31, 2024
Wolverine Annual	Ezra Claytan Daniels	Yildiray Cinar & Sara Pichelli	August 14, 2024
Incredible Hulk Annual	Derek Landy	Geoff Shaw & Sara Pichelli	August 28, 2024
Moon Knight Annual	Dan Watters & Derek Landy	Sara Pichelli	September 4, 2024
Spider-Boy Annual	Steve Foxe	Carlos Nieto	September 18, 2024
Avengers Annual	Derek Landy	Salvador Larroca	September 25, 2024
Marvel 80 Years
Crypt of Shadows	Al Ewing	Garry Brown, Stephen Green & Djibril Morissette-Phan	January 23, 2019
War is Hell	Howard Chaykin & Phillip Kennedy Johnson	Howard Chaykin & Alberto Jimenez Alburquerque	January 23, 2019
Journey into Unknown Worlds	Cullen Bunn	Francesco Manna	January 30, 2019
The Gunhawks	David Lapham & Maria Lapham	Luca Pizzari	February 6, 2019
Love Romances	Dennis Hopeless, Gail Simone & Jon Adams	Jon Adams, Annapaola Martello & Roge Antonio	February 20, 2019
Ziggy Pig – Silly Seal Comics	Frank Tieri	Jacob Chabot	March 6, 2019
Incredible Hulk: Last Call	Peter David	Dale Keown	June 5, 2019
Wolverine: Exit Wounds	Chris Claremont, Larry Hama & Sam Kieth	Salvador Larroca & Sam Kieth	June 26, 2019
Captain America & The Invaders: The Bahamas Triangle	Roy Thomas	Jerry Ordway	July 3, 2019
Sensational Spider-Man: Self-Improvement	Peter David, Randy Schueller & Tom DeFalco	Rick Leonardi & Ron Frenz	August 7, 2019
The Amazing Spider-Man: Going Big	Erik Larsen & Gerry Conway	Erik Larsen & Mark Bagley	September 4, 2019
New Mutants: War Children	Chris Claremont	Bill Sienkiewicz	September 18, 2019
Avengers: Loki Unleashed	Roger Stern	Ron Lim	September 25, 2019
Bizarre Adventures	Jed MacKay & Chris Onstad	Francesco Manna, Chris Mooneyham & Becky Cloonan	October 2, 2019
Marvel Rising
Marvel Rising #0	Devin Grayson	Marco Failla	April 25, 2018
Marvel Rising Alpha	Devin Grayson	Georges Duarte	June 13, 2018
Marvel Rising: Squirrel Girl / Ms. Marvel	Devin Grayson, G. Willow Wilson & Ryan North	Irene Strychalsk & Ramon Bachs	July 4, 2018
Marvel Rising: Ms. Marvel / Squirrel Girl	Devin Grayson, G. Willow Wilson & Ryan North	Irene Strychalsk & Ramon Bachs	August 1, 2018
Marvel Rising Omega	Devin Grayson	Georges Duarte & Roberto Di Salvo	September 12, 2018
Marvel Tales
Doctor Doom & Rocket Raccoon	J. Michael Straczynski	Will Robson	January 22, 2025
Captain America & Volstagg	J. Michael Straczynski	Bernard Chang	February 26, 2025
Nick Fury vs. Fin Fang Foom	J. Michael Straczynski	Elena Casagrande	March 12, 2025
Hulk & Doctor Strange	J. Michael Straczynski	Germán Peralta & Natacha Bustos	May 21, 2025
Ghost Rider vs. Galactus	J. Michael Straczynski	Juan Ferreyra	June 4, 2025
Spider-Man vs. The Sinister Sixteen	J. Michael Straczynski	Phil Noto	July 30, 2025
Marvel's Voices
Marvel's Voices	Various		February 19, 2020
Marvel's Voices: Indigenous Voices	Various		November 18, 2020
Marvel's Voices: Legacy (vol. 1)	Various		February 3, 2021
Marvel's Voices: Pride (vol. 1)	Various		June 23, 2021
Marvel's Voices: Identity (vol. 1)	Various		August 25, 2021
Marvel's Voices: Community (vol. 1)	Various		December 8, 2021
Marvel's Voices: Heritage	Various		January 12, 2022
Marvel's Voices: Legacy (vol. 2)	Various		February 16, 2022
Marvel's Voices: Identity (vol. 2)	Various		May 11, 2022
Marvel's Voices: Pride (vol. 2)	Various		June 15, 2022
Marvel's Voices: Community (vol. 2)	Various		September 28, 2022
Marvel's Voices: Wakanda Forever	Various		February 1, 2023
Marvel's Voices: Spider-Verse	Various		April 5, 2023
Marvel's Voices: Pride (vol. 3)	Various		June 14, 2023
Marvel's Voices: X-Men	Various		August 16, 2023
Marvel's Voices: Avengers	Various		December 6, 2023
Marvel's Voices: Legends	Various		January 31, 2024
X-Men: The Wedding Special	Various		May 29, 2024
Ghost Rider: Robbie Reyes Special	Various		October 2, 2024
Kahhori: Reshaper Of Worlds	Various		November 6, 2024
Storm: Lifedream	Various		January 29, 2025
Marvel United: A Pride Special	Various		June 11, 2025
White Tiger: Reborn	Various		October 1, 2025
Echo: Seeker of Truth	Various		November 5, 2025
Jubilee: Deadly Reunion	Various		April 29, 2026
Marvels Snapshots
Sub-Mariner: Marvels Snapshots	Alan Brennert & Kurt Busiek	Jerry Ordway	March 11, 2020
Fantastic Four: Marvels Snapshots	Evan Dorkin, Sarah Dyer & Kurt Busiek	Benjamin Dewey	March 25, 2020
Captain America: Marvels Snapshots	Mark Russell & Kurt Busiek	Ramón Pérez	June 24, 2020
X-Men: Marvels Snapshots	Jay Edidin & Kurt Busiek	Tom Reilly	September 16, 2020
Spider-Man: Marvels Snapshots	Howard Chaykin		October 7, 2020
Avengers: Marvels Snapshots	Barbara Randall Kesel & Kurt Busiek	Staz Johnson	November 18, 2020
Civil War: Marvels Snapshots	Saladin Ahmed	Ryan Kelly	December 2, 2020
Captain Marvel: Marvels Snapshots	Mark Waid	Colleen Doran	February 24, 2021
Ms. Marvel
Ms. Marvel & Wolverine	Jody Houser	Zé Carlos	August 13, 2022
Ms. Marvel & Moon Knight	Jody Houser	Ibraim Roberson	August 17, 2022
Ms. Marvel & Venom	Jody Houser	Dave Wachter	September 14, 2022
Moon Girl
Miles Morales and Moon Girl	Mohale Mishigo	Ig Guara	June 1, 2022
Avengers and Moon Girl	Mohale Mishigo	Diogenes Neves	July 13, 2022
X-Men and Moon Girl	Mohale Mishigo	Ig Guara	August 24, 2022
Murderworld
Murderworld: Avengers	Jim Zub & Ray Fawkes	Jethro Morales	November 16, 2022
Murderworld: Spider-Man	Jim Zub & Ray Fawkes	Farid Karami	December 28, 2022
Murderworld: Wolverine	Jim Zub & Ray Fawkes	Carlos Nieto	January 25, 2023
Murderworld: Moon Knight	Jim Zub & Ray Fawkes	Luca Pizzari	February 15, 2023
Murderworld: Game Over	Jim Zub & Ray Fawkes	Netho Diaz	March 1, 2023
Prodigal Sun
Fantastic Four: Prodigal Sun	Peter David	Francesco Manna	July 3, 2019
Silver Surfer: Prodigal Sun	Peter David	Francesco Manna	August 14, 2019
Guardians of the Galaxy: Prodigal Sun	Peter David	Francesco Manna	September 11, 2019
Punisher War Journal
Punisher War Journal: Blitz	Torunn Grønbekk	Lan Medina	June 1, 2022
Punisher War Journal: Brother	Torunn Grønbekk	Rafael Pimentel	October 12, 2022
Punisher War Journal: Base	Torunn Grønbekk	Djibril Morissette-Phan	February 2, 2023
Secret Warps
Secret Warps: Soldier Supreme Annual	Al Ewing & Mark Waid	Carlos Gomez & Alex Lins	July 3, 2019
Secret Warps: Weapon Hex Annual	Al Ewing & Tim Seeley	Carlos Villa & Bob Quinn	July 10, 2019
Secret Warps: Ghost Panther Annual	Al Ewing & Daniel Kibblesmith	Carlos Gomez & Ig Guara	July 17, 2019
Secret Warps: Arachknight Annual	Al Ewing & Jim Zub	Carlos Villa & Carlos Barberi	July 24, 2019
Secret Warps: Iron Hammer Annual	Al Ewing & Tini Howard	Carlos Gomez & Ario Anandito	July 31, 2019
Strange Academy
Strange Academy: Miles Morales	Carlos Hernandez	Juann Cabal	August 2, 2023
Strange Academy: Moon Knight	Carlos Hernandez	Ze Carlos	September 20, 2023
Strange Academy: Spider-Man	Carlos Hernandez	Vasco Georgiev	October 5, 2023
The Best Defense
Immortal Hulk: The Best Defense	Al Ewing	Simone Di Meo	December 5, 2018
Namor: The Best Defense	Chip Zdarsky	Simone Di Meo	December 5, 2018
Doctor Strange: The Best Defense	Gerry Duggan	Greg Smallwood	December 12, 2018
Silver Surfer: The Best Defense	Jason Latour		December 12, 2018
Defenders: The Best Defense	Al Ewing	Joe Bennett	December 19, 2018
The End
Miles Morales: The End	Saladin Ahmed	Damion Scott	January 8, 2020
Venom: The End	Adam Warren	Chamba	January 15, 2020
Captain Marvel: The End	Kelly Thompson	Carmen Carneo	January 29, 2020
Deadpool: The End	Joe Kelly	Mike Hawthorne	January 29, 2020
Doctor Strange: The End	Leah Williams	Filipe Andrade	January 29, 2020
Captain America: The End	Erik Larsen		February 5, 2020
The Ruins of Ravencroft
The Ruins of Ravencroft: Carnage	Frank Tieri	Guiu Villanova	January 8, 2020
The Ruins of Ravencroft: Sabretooth	Frank Tieri	Guillermo Sanna	January 15, 2020
The Ruins of Ravencroft: Dracula	Frank Tieri	Stefano Landini	January 22, 2020
Typhoid Fever
Typhoid Fever: Spider-Man	Clay McLeod Chapman	Stefano Landini	October 3, 2018
Typhoid Fever: X-Men	Clay McLeod Chapman	Will Robson	November 7, 2018
Typhoid Fever: Iron Fist	Clay McLeod Chapman	Paolo Villanelli	December 12, 2018
Unforgiven
Unforgiven: Spider-Man	Tim Seeley	Sid Kotian	March 1, 2023
Unforgiven: X-Men	Tim Seeley	Sid Kotian	March 29, 2023
Unforgiven: Captain America	Tim Seeley	Sid Kotian	April 19, 2023
Wakanda Forever
Amazing Spider-Man: Wakanda Forever	Nnedi Okorafor	Alberto Jimenez Alburquerque	June 27, 2018
X-Men: Wakanda Forever	Nnedi Okorafor	Ray-Anthony Height	July 25, 2018
Avengers: Wakanda Forever	Nnedi Okorafor	Oleg Okunev	August 22, 2018
Wastelanders
Wastelanders: Wolverine	Steven S. Deknight	Ibrahim Moustafa	December 15, 2020
Wastelanders: Hawkeye	Ethan Sacks	Ibraim Roberson	December 22, 2020
Wastelanders: Star-Lord	Rich Douek	Brent Peeples	December 29, 2020
Wastelanders: Doom	Torunn Grønbekk	Julius Ohta	January 5, 2021
Wastelanders: Black Widow	Steven S. Deknight	Well-Bee	January 12, 2021
Web of Venom
Web of Venom: Ve'nam	Donny Cates	Juanan Ramirez	August 29, 2018
Web of Venom: Carnage Born	Donny Cates	Danilo S. Beyruth	November 21, 2018
Web of Venom: Unleashed	Ryan Stegman	Kyle Hotz	January 9, 2019
Web of Venom: Cult of Carnage	Frank Tieri	Danilo S. Beyruth	April 10, 2019
Web of Venom: Funeral Pyre	Cullen Bunn	Alberto Jimenez Albuquerque & Joshua Cassara	July 24, 2019
Web of Venom: The Good Son	Zac Thompson	Diogenes Neves	January 22, 2020
Web of Venom: Wraith	Donny Cates	Guiu Vilanova	September 9, 2020
Web of Venom: Empyre's End	Clay McLeod Chapman	Guiu Vilanova	November 4, 2020
What If?
What If?: Flash Thompson Became Spider-Man	Gerry Conway	Diego Olortegui	October 3, 2018
What If?: The X-Men were .EXEmen	Bryan Edward Hill	Neil Edwards & Giannis Milonogiannis	October 3, 2018
What If?: Peter Parker Became The Punisher	Carl Potts	Juanan Ramirez	October 10, 2018
What If?: Marvel Comics Went Metal With Ghost Rider	Sebastian Griner	Caspar Wijngaard	October 17, 2018
What If?: Thor was Raised by Frost Giants	Ethan Sacks	Michele Bandini	October 24, 2018
What If?: Magik Became Sorcerer Supreme	Leah Williams	Filipe Andrade	October 31, 2018
What If? Dark
What If...? Dark: Loki	Walter Simonson	Scot Eaton	July 5, 2023
What If...? Dark: Spider-Gwen	Gerry Conway & Jody Houser	Ramon Bach	July 19, 2023
What If...? Dark: Venom	Stephanie Phillips	Jethro Morales	August 2, 2023
What If...? Dark: Moon Knight	Erica Schultz	Edgar Salazar	August 16, 2023
What If...? Dark: Carnage	Larry Hama	John McCrea	September 20, 2023
What If...? Dark: Tomb of Dracula	Marv Wolfman	David Cutler & Scott Hanna	November 8, 2023
X-Men: Black
X-Men: Black – Magneto	Chris Claremont	Dalibor Talajić	October 3, 2018
X-Men: Black – Mojo	Scott Aukerman	Nick Bradshaw	October 10, 2018
X-Men: Black – Mystique	Seanan McGuire	Marco Failla	October 17, 2018
X-Men: Black – Juggernaut	Robbie Thompson	Shawn Crystal	October 24, 2018
X-Men: Black – Emma Frost	Leah Williams	Chris Bachalo	October 31, 2018

=== One-shots ===
Title	Writer	Artist	Published
Alligator Loki	Alyssa Wong	Bob Quinn	September 13, 2023
Alpha Flight: True North	Jim Zub, Jed MacKay & Ed Brisson	Max Dunbar, Djibril Morisette-Phan & Scott Hepburn	September 4, 2019
Amadeus Cho 20th Anniversary Special	Greg Pak	Takeshi Miyazawa, Creees Lee & Jethro Morales	May 7, 2025
Amazing Fantasy #1000	Various		August 31, 2022
Amazing Spider-Man: Full Circle	Nick Spencer & Jonathan Hickman	Chris Bachalo & Chris Sprouse	October 23, 2019
Amazing Spider-Man: Sins of Norman Osborn	Nick Spencer	Federico Vincentini	September 16, 2020
Amazing Spider-Man: Sins Rising Prelude	Nick Spencer	Kim Jacinto	July 22, 2020
Avengers 1,000,000 B.C.	Jason Aaron	Kev Walker	August 17, 2022
Avengers Assemble: Alpha	Jason Aaron	Bryan Hitch	November 30, 2022
Avengers Assemble: Omega	Jason Aaron	Various	April 19, 2023
Avengers Halloween Special	Various		October 31, 2018
Avengers: Edge of Infinity	Ralph Macchio	Andrea Di Vito	April 24, 2019
Black Panther Anniversary Special	Various		February 11, 2026
Black Panther: Unconquered	Bryan Edward Hill	Alberto Foche Duarte	November 9, 2022
Black Widow: Venomous	Erica Schultz	Luciano Vecchio	July 31, 2024
Black Widow: Widow's Sting	Ralph Macchio	Simone Buonfantino	October 28, 2020
Blade: Vampire Nation	Mark Russell	Mico Suayan	November 16, 2022
Cable/Deadpool Annual	David F. Walker	Various	August 15, 2018
Captain America (vol. 10) #0	Tochi Onyebuchi, Collin Kelly & Jackson Lanzing	Mattia De Iulis	April 20, 2022
Captain America & The Winter Soldier Special	Collin Kelly & Jackson Lanzing	Kev Walker	November 16, 2022
Captain America Anniversary Tribute	Various		March 17, 2021
Captain America: Cold War Alpha	Collin Kelly, Jackson Lanzing & Tochi Onyebuchi	Carlos Magno	April 12, 2023
Captain Marvel Annual	Torunn Grønbekk	Carlos Gómez	April 6, 2022
Captain Marvel: Assault on Eden	Anthony Oliveira	Eleonora Carlini	October 11, 2023
Captain Marvel: Braver & Mightier	Jody Houser	Simone Buonfantino	February 27, 2019
Carnage Forever	Phillip Kennedy Johnson, Ram V & Ty Templeton	Ty Templeton & Edgar Salazar	February 23, 2022
Chris Claremont Anniversary Special	Chris Claremont	Brett Booth & Bill Sienkiewicz	December 16, 2020
Concert of Champions	Jason Loo	Rafael Loureiro	April 2, 2025
Crazy	Various		September 11, 2019
Crypt of Shadows (vol. 3)	Various		October 19, 2022
Crypt of Shadows (vol. 4)	Various		October 18, 2023
Crypt of Shadows (vol. 5)	Various		October 16, 2024
Darkhawk: Heart Of The Hawk	Danny Fingeroth, Dan Abnett & Kyle Higgins	Mike Mabley & Andrea Di Vito	April 14, 2021
Deadpool Nerdy 30	Various		March 10, 2021
Deadpool: Seven Slaughters	Various		November 15, 2023
Deadpool/Wolverine: Weapon X-Traction	Ryan North	Javier Garrón	December 4, 2024
Deathlok 50th Anniversary Special	Justina Ireland & Christopher Priest	Dale Eaglesham, Matthew Waite & Luke Ross	September 18, 2024
Doctor Strange (vol. 7) #450	Various		September 3, 2025
Doctor Strange: Nexus of Nightmares	Ralph Macchio	Ibrahim Moustafa	April 20, 2022
Doom	Jonathan Hickman & Sanford Greene	Sanford Greene	May 15, 2024
Doom 2099: Rage of Doom	Frank Tieri	Von Randal	April 29, 2026
Elektra #100	Ann Nocenti	Paulo Siqueira & Ty Templeton	April 13, 2022
Eternals 50th Anniversary	Various		April 1, 2026
Eternals Forever	Ralph Macchio	Ramón Bachs	October 13, 2021
Eternals: Celestia	Kieron Gillen	Kei Zama	October 6, 2021
Eternals: Thanos Rises	Kieron Gillen	Dustin Weaver	September 15, 2021
Eternals: The Heretic	Kieron Gillen	Ryan Bodenheim	April 16, 2022
Fallen Friend: The Death Of Ms. Marvel	G. Willow Wilson, Saladin Ahmed & Mark Waid	Humberto Ramos, Takeshi Miyazawa & Andrea Di Vito	July 12, 2023
Fantastic Four Anniversary Tribute	Stan Lee & Jack Kirby	Various	November 10, 2021
Fantastic Four: 4 Yancy Street	Gerry Duggan	Greg Smallwood	August 21, 2019
Fantastic Four: Grimm Noir	Gerry Duggan	Ron Garney	February 26, 2020
Fantastic Four: Negative Zone	Mike Carey & Ryan North	Stefano Caselli & Steve Uy	November 27, 2019
Fantastic Four: Road Trip	Christopher Cantwell	Filipe Andrade	December 2, 2020
Fantastic Four: Wedding Special	Various		December 12, 2018
Fury	Al Ewing	Various	May 24, 2023
Ghost Rider: Return of Vengeance	Howard Mackie	Javier Saltares	December 30, 2020
Ghost Rider: Vengeance Forever	Benjamin Percy	Juan Jose Ryp	April 10, 2022
Giant-Size Amazing Spider-Man: Chameleon Conspiracy	Nick Spencer	Carlos Gomez	June 30, 2021
Giant-Size Amazing Spider-Man: King's Ransom	Nick Spencer	Rogê Antônio	May 12, 2021
Giant-Size Black Cat: Infinity Score	Jed MacKay	C.F. Villa	December 8, 2021
Giant-Size Gwen Stacy	Christos Gage	Todd Nauck	August 10, 2022
Giant-Sized X-Statix	Peter Milligan	Mike Allred	July 10, 2019
Guardians of the Galaxy: Bane of Blastaar	Ralph Macchio	Davide Tinto	April 26, 2023
Guardians of the Galaxy: Cosmic Rewind	Kevin Shinick	Gerardo Sandoval	November 2, 2022
Hallow's Eve: The Big Night	Erica Schultz	Michael Dowling	October 25, 2023
Heroes At Home	Zeb Wells	Gurihiru	December 2, 2020
Howard the Duck (vol. 7)	Chip Zdarsky, Daniel Kibblesmith & Merritt K	Joe Quinones & Annie Wu	November 29, 2023
Hulk vs. Thor: Banner of War Alpha	Donny Cates	Martin Coccolo	May 11, 2022
Hulk: Grand Design – Madness	Jim Rugg		April 27, 2022
Hulk: Grand Design – Monster	Jim Rugg		March 30, 2022
Hulkling and Wiccan	Josh Trujillo	Jodi Nishijima	June 15, 2022
Immortal Hulk: Flatline	Declan Shalvey		January 27, 2021
Immortal Hulk: Great Power	Tom Taylor	Jorge Molina	February 5, 2020
Immortal Hulk: The Threshing Place	Jeff Lemire	Mike Del Mundo	September 30, 2020
Immortal Hulk: Time of Monsters	Al Ewing, Alex Paknadel & David Vaughan	Juan Ferreyra	May 19, 2021
Immortal She-Hulk	Al Ewing	Jon Davis Hunt	September 23, 2020
Incoming!	Various		December 25, 2019
Iron Fist 50th Anniversary Special	Various		August 14, 2024
Iron Man/Hellcat Annual	Christopher Cantwell	Ruairí Coleman	June 1, 2022
Ironheart: Bad Chemistry	John Jennings	Jethro Morales	April 2, 2024
Journey Into Mystery: The Birth of Krakoa	Dennis Hopeless	Djibril Morissette-Phan	September 12, 2018
Kid Venom: Origins	Taigami		January 3, 2024
Kidpool & Spider-Boy	Christopher Yost	Nathan Stockman, Jed Dougherty & Chris Campana	December 25, 2024
Legend of Shang-Chi	Alyssa Wong	Andie Tong	January 6, 2021
Life of Wolverine	Jim Zub	Ramón F. Bachs	July 3, 2024
Luna Snow: World Tour	Greg Pak	Ario Anindito & Takeshi Miyazawa	January 14, 2026
Marvel 85th Anniversary Special	Various		August 28, 2024
Marvel Age #1000	Various		August 30, 2023
Marvel All-On-One	Ryan North	Ed McGuinness	August 20, 2025
Marvel Comics #1000	Various		August 28, 2019
Marvel Comics #1001	Various		September 25, 2019
Marvel Monsters	Cullen Bunn	Various	August 28, 2019
Marvel Rivals: Ignite	Peach Momoko & Zack Davisson	Peach Momoko	June 11, 2025
Marvel Zero	Various		July 5, 2023
Marvel Zero (vol. 2)	Various		July 24, 2024
Marvel Zero (vol. 3)	Various		July 2, 2025
Marvel Zombie	Maxwell Prince	Stefano Raffaele	October 17, 2018
Marvel Zombies: Resurrection	Phillip Kennedy Johnson	Leonard Kirk	October 30, 2019
Marvels Epilogue	Kurt Busiek & Alex Ross	Alex Ross	July 24, 2019
Mary Jane & Black Cat: Beyond	Jed MacKay	C.F. Villa	January 19, 2022
Merry X-Men Holiday Special	Various		December 5, 2018
Moon Girl & Devil Dinosaur 10th Anniversary Special	Brandon Montclare & Justina Ireland	Natacha Bustos & Luca Clareti	April 2, 2024
Morbius: Bond of Blood	Ralph Macchio	Tom Reilly	February 10, 2021
Outlawed	Eve Ewing	Kim Jacinto	March 18, 2020
Original X-Men	Christos Gage	Greg Land	December 20, 2023
Planet-Size X-Men	Gerry Duggan	Pepe Larraz	June 16, 2021
Power Pack: Grow Up!	Louise Simonson	June Brigman	August 28, 2019
Red Goblin: Red Death	Patrick Gleason, Rob Fee & Sean Ryan	Pete Woods	October 30, 2019
Return to Planet Hulk	Greg Pak	Carlo Pagulayan	October 8, 2025
Roxxon Presents: Thor	Al Ewing	Greg Land	April 17, 2024
Season's Beatings	Various		December 19, 2018
Secret X-Men	Tini Howard	Francesco Mobili	February 9, 2022
Shang-Chi: Master of the Ten Rings	Gene Luen Yang	Michael Yg	January 4, 2023
Silver Surfer Annual	Ethan Sacks	André Lima Araújo	September 5, 2018
Spider-Man Annual	Jason Latour & Phil Lord	David Lafuente & Jason Latour	June 26, 2019
Spider-Man: Enter the Spider-Verse	Ralph Macchio	Flaviano Armentaro	November 21, 2018
Spider-Man: Reptilian Rage	Ralph Macchio	Christopher Allen	June 26, 2019
Spirits of Ghost Rider: Mother of Demons	Ed Brisson	Roland Boschi	February 12, 2020
Spirits of Vengeance: Spirit Rider	Taboo & B. Earl	Paul Davidson	August 4, 2021
Superior Spider-Man Returns	Dan Slott	Mark Bagley, Giuseppe Camuncoli & Humberto Ramos	October 11, 2023
Thanos: Death Notes	Various		November 30, 2022
Thor: The Worthy	Various		December 4, 2019
Thor: Lightning and Lament	Ralph Macchio	Todd Nauck	June 29, 2022
Timeless (vol. 1)	Jed Mackay	Various	December 29, 2021
Timeless (vol. 2)	Jed Mackay	Various	December 28, 2022
Timeless (vol. 3)	Collin Kelly & Jackson Lanzing	Juann Cabal	December 27, 2023
Timeslide	Steve Foxe	Ivan Fiorelli	December 25, 2024
Ultimate Hawkeye (vol. 2)	Deniz Camp, B. Earl & Taboo	Juan Frigeri & Michael Sta. Maria	September 24, 2025
Ultimate Universe	Jonathan Hickman	Stefano Caselli	November 1, 2023
Ultimate Universe Finale	Various		June 24, 2026
Ultimate Universe: One Year In	Deniz Camp	Jonas Scharf	December 11, 2024
Ultimate Universe: Two Years In	Deniz Camp & Alex Paknadel	Various	December 3, 2025
Uncanny X-Men: Winter's End	Sina Grace	Nathan Stockman	March 13, 2019
Weapon Plus: World War IV	Benjamin Percy	Georges Jeanty	January 28, 2020
Web of Spider-Man	Various		March 27, 2024
Web of Spider-Verse: New Blood	Various		March 5, 2025
Web of Venom	Jordan Morris	Ramon Rosanas & Luke Ross	April 8, 2026
Web of Venomverse: Fresh Brains	Various		April 2, 2025
Werewolf by Night	Derek Landy	Fran Galán	September 13, 2023
Werewolf by Night: Blood Moon Rise	Michael Giacchino & Jason Loo	David Messina	July 30, 2025
Widowmakers: Red Guardian and Yelena Belova	Devin Grayson	Michele Bandini	November 18, 2020
Will of Doom	Chip Zdarsky	CAFU	December 24, 2025
Wolverine & Captain America: Weapon Plus	Ethan Sacks	Diogenes Neves	July 10, 2019
Wolverine vs. Blade	Marc Guggenheim	Dave Wilkins	July 10, 2019
Women of Marvel (vol. 2)	Various		April 21, 2021
Women of Marvel (vol. 3)	Various		March 9, 2022
Women of Marvel (vol. 4)	Various		March 22, 2023
Women of Marvel (vol. 5)	Various		February 28, 2024
Women of Marvel: She-Devils	Stephanie Phillips & Alison Sampson	Alison Sampson	February 26, 2025
X-Force: Killshot	Rob Liefeld		November 3, 2021
X-Manhunt Omega	Gail Simone & Murewa Ayodele	Gleb Melnikov	March 26, 2025
X-Men Blue: Origins	Si Spurrier	Wilton Santos	November 29, 2023
X-Men Unlimited: Latitude	Jonathan Hickman	Declan Shalvey	March 16, 2022
X-Men: Hellfire Gala	Gerry Duggan	Various	June 29, 2022
X-Men: Hellfire Gala 2023	Gerry Duggan	Various	July 26, 2023
X-Men: Hellfire Vigil	Various		July 2, 2025
X-Men: The Onslaught Revelation	Si Spurrier	Bob Quinn	September 22, 2022

== See also ==
- List of current Marvel Comics publications
