= Kitty Pryde =

Marvel Comics fictional character

Kitty Pryde Shadowcat
- Kitty Pryde and Lockheed as depicted on a variant cover of Marauders #3 (December 2019). Art by Jeehyung Lee.

Publication information
- Publisher: Marvel Comics
- First appearance: The Uncanny X-Men #129 (January 1980)
- Created by: Chris Claremont (writer); John Byrne (artist)

In-story information
- Full name: Katherine Anne "Kitty" Pryde
- Species: Human mutant
- Team affiliations: X-Men; All-New X-Men; Excalibur; Marauders; S.H.I.E.L.D. Guardians of the Galaxy; Hellfire Trading Company; Quiet Council of Krakoa
- Notable aliases: Shadowcat; Ariel; Sprite; Star-Lord (Star-Lady); Captain Kate Pryde; Red Queen; Shadowkat
- Abilities: Intangibility: Projective intangibility; Intangible disruption; Intangible travel; Gifted intellect; Skilled martial artist

Katherine Anne "Kitty" Pryde is a character appearing in American comic books published by Marvel Comics, commonly in association with the X-Men. The character first appeared in The Uncanny X-Men #129 (January 1980) and was co-created by writer-artist John Byrne and writer Chris Claremont. A mutant, Pryde possesses a "phasing" ability that allows her to pass through objects, hence she is intangible while using this ability. This power also disrupts any electrical field she passes through, and lets her simulate levitation.

The youngest to join the X-Men, she was first portrayed as a "kid sister" to many older members of the group, filling the role of literary foil to the more established characters. She occasionally used the codenames Sprite and Ariel, cycling through several uniforms until settling on her trademark black-and-gold costume. In later comic books, she becomes schooled in fighting techniques and receives ninja stealth training, which combine with her powers to make her one of the X-Men's most proficient and reliable combatants. She is frequently deployed on surveillance and espionage missions.

During the miniseries Kitty Pryde and Wolverine, she was renamed Shadowcat, the alias she would be most associated with, and shifted to a more mature depiction in her subsequent appearances. Pryde would eventually abandon her nickname, "Kitty", and switch to "Kate". She was one of the main cast of characters depicted in the original Excalibur title. After momentarily joining the Guardians of the Galaxy, she assumed her then-fiancé's superhero identity as the Star-Lord (Star-Lady). In the series Marauders, she was informally known as Captain Kate Pryde and the Red Queen of the Hellfire Trading Company. After rejoining the X-Men in the "Fall of X" relaunch, she assumes the name Shadowkat.

In the 20th Century Fox X-Men film series, Kitty Pryde was initially portrayed by young actresses in cameos; Sumela Kay in X-Men (2000) and Katie Stuart in X2 (2003). Later, Elliot Page (Note: Credited as Ellen Page; both films were released before Page came out as transgender.) portrayed the character in X-Men: The Last Stand (2006) and X-Men: Days of Future Past (2014) in full-length appearances.

== Publication history ==
=== 1980s and 1990s: Creation and introduction ===
Kitty Pryde was introduced into the X-Men title as the result of a Marvel Comics editorial dictate that the series depict a school for mutant children. The Uncanny X-Men artist John Byrne named Kitty Pryde after a classmate he met in art school (Canada's Alberta College of Art and Design) in 1973. Byrne had told Pryde he liked her name and asked her permission to use it, promising to name his first original comics character after her. Byrne drew the character to slightly resemble an adolescent Sigourney Weaver.

The fictional Kitty Pryde first appeared in The Uncanny X-Men #129 (January 1980), by writer Chris Claremont and artist Byrne, as a highly intelligent 13-year-old girl. Claremont said several elements of the character's personality were derived from those of X-Men editor Louise Simonson's daughter, Julie. Claremont and Byrne made the new character a full-fledged X-Man in issue #139, where she was codenamed "Sprite". She was the main character in issues #141–142, the "Days of Future Past" storyline, where she is possessed by the consciousness of her older self, "Kate", who time travels from a dystopian future back to the present to get the X-Men to help her prevent an eventual mass extermination of mutants. The six-issue miniseries Kitty Pryde and Wolverine (1984–1985), written by Claremont, is a coming-of-age storyline in which she matures from a girl to a young woman, adopting the new name "Shadowcat".

In the late 1980s, Kitty joined the British-based super team, Excalibur, where she remained for roughly ten years before coming back to the X-Men.

Kitty Pryde appeared in three 3-issue miniseries in the 1990s; she teamed up with Pete Wisdom in 1996 for Pryde and Wisdom, recruited by S.H.I.E.L.D. in 1997 for Kitty Pryde, Agent of S.H.I.E.L.D., and with Rachel Summers for 1999's X-Men: True Friends. True Friends was initially planned as a 1984 graphic novel by Chris Claremont, starring Pryde and Magik, but it was never published.

=== 2000s and 2010s ===
In the early 2000s, she disappeared from the spotlight after semi-retiring from superhero work. She was featured in the 2002 mini-series Mekanix and came back to the main X-Men books in 2004 under the pen of Joss Whedon in Astonishing X-Men, while also appearing as a supporting character in X-Treme X-Men. In 2005, the 5 issue miniseries X-Men: Kitty Pryde - Shadow & Flame was published. She remained a part of the X-Men books until 2008 when she was absent for 2 years after the events of Giant-Size Astonishing X-Men.

After returning in Uncanny X-Men #521 (February, 2010), she was featured in Jason Aaron's Wolverine and the X-Men and Brian Michael Bendis' All-New X-Men books.

In early 2015, she joined the Guardians of the Galaxy. After the Secret Wars event, she adopted her new alias, Star-Lord (first believed to be Star-Lady). She was featured in the 2019 Age of X-Man crossover event.

=== 2020s: Krakoa and From the Ashes ===
Kitty Pryde was featured during the Krakoan Age of X-Men comics, notably as the star of Marauders. In 2020, Kitty Pryde was revealed to be bisexual. Her co-creator, Chris Claremont, said he had always intended this to be the case, considering Rachel Summers as a possible love interest for Pryde. However, Claremont said he was not allowed to show this at the time, as he claimed on the "Xplain the X-Men" podcast in 2016. She also featured in the 2023 third volume of X-Treme X-Men.

Pryde was featured during the Fall of X storyline. During the X-Men: From the Ashes relaunch, Kitty Pryde is teaching young mutants in the 2025 series Exceptional X-Men.

Shadowcat's popularity had a profound effect on the real-life Kitty Pryde, who became so overwhelmed by attention from fans that she abbreviated her name to K.D. Pryde to avoid association with the character. She has since stated she has mixed feelings about her fame, saying she values Byrne's comics for their entertainment and artistic value, but wishes more people would appreciate her as more than just Shadowcat's namesake.

== Fictional character biography ==
Katherine Anne "Kitty" Pryde was born in Deerfield, Illinois, to Carmen and Theresa Pryde. She is an Ashkenazi Jewish-American and her paternal grandfather, Samuel Prydeman, was held in a Nazi concentration camp during World War II. Kitty started to have headaches at age thirteen, signaling the emergence of her mutant powers. She was approached by both the X-Men's Charles Xavier and the Hellfire Club's White Queen, Emma Frost, both of whom hoped to recruit her for their respective causes. Kitty was unnerved by Frost, observing that the White Queen looked at her as if she were "something good to eat." She got along better with Xavier and the three X-Men who escorted him, quickly becoming friends with Ororo Munroe. Ororo told Kitty who she really was and about the X-Men, which made the teenager even more enthusiastic about attending Xavier's school.

Their conversation was cut short when they (along with Wolverine and Colossus) were attacked by armored mercenaries in the employ of Frost and the Hellfire Club. The X-Men defeated their assailants, but were subdued by the White Queen's telepathic powers immediately after. In the confusion, Kitty was separated from the X-Men, and not captured along with them. She managed to contact Cyclops, Phoenix, and Nightcrawler. With the help of Dazzler and Pryde, those X-Men rescued their teammates from the Hellfire Club.

The White Queen appeared to perish in the battle, which meant she was no longer competing with Xavier for the approval of Kitty's parents. Kitty's parents had not heard from her in more than a day, because during that time she was first being pursued by the Hellfire Club's men and then working with the X-Men to save their friends. All they knew was Kitty had left with Xavier's "students" to get a soda, there had been reports that the soda shop had been blown up, and Kitty had been missing since. Therefore, they were angry at Xavier when he finally returned with Kitty in tow. At first, it seemed like there was no chance of Kitty being allowed to attend the school and join the X-Men. Phoenix then used her considerable telepathic power to erase the memories of Kitty's parents and plant false ones, resulting in a complete shift in their attitude towards Xavier. Kitty was then allowed to enroll at Xavier's school with her parents' blessing, becoming the youngest member of the team.

=== Joining the X-Men ===
Kitty joined the X-Men, and assumed the costumed identity of Sprite. Early in her career as an X-Man, Kitty's adult self from an alternate future took possession of her body in the present to help X-Men thwart the assassination of Senator Robert Kelly by the second Brotherhood of Mutants. Kitty then singlehandedly defeated a N'Garai demon. Kitty also briefly attended the White Queen's Massachusetts Academy when her parents became convinced that she needed to be with students of her own age, but following a failed attempt to subdue the X-Men, Frost revoked Kitty's admission.

During her teen years, Kitty fostered a number of close relationships with others at the school and in the X-Men. She developed a crush on Colossus and became close friends with his little sister Illyana Rasputin. Initially uneasy around Nightcrawler and other mutants with physical deformities, Kitty finally overcame her fears and became close friends with him. Kitty also befriended Lockheed, an intelligent alien resembling a dragon, who followed her home after a mission in outer space. Lockheed is extremely loyal to Kitty, and the two of them share a psychic bond. Wolverine became something of a mentor to Kitty despite his usually gruff personality. Storm came to view Kitty as the daughter she never had.

Though Xavier has threatened to reassign Kitty to the New Mutants, a team of younger mutants he established in the absence of the X-Men, ever since the X-Men returned from outer space, she never ended up joining the group, who she derisively calls the "X-Babies". Kitty was later abducted by the Morlocks and nearly forced to wed Caliban. She was then abducted by the White Queen, but rescued by the New Mutants.

During this time, Kitty began to date Colossus, although this did not last long. Colossus developed feelings for an alien woman named Zsaji whom he met on the Beyonder's planet in the first Secret Wars. Colossus' feelings toward Zsaji were primarily a side effect of her own unique healing abilities, which she had used on him after he became injured. Regardless, Colossus' feelings were real and he returned to Earth consumed with grief after Zsaji's death. He admitted to Kitty that he loved Zsaji, which hurt her deeply and ended the budding romantic relationship. Kitty had made good friends with a local boy from Salem Central named Doug Ramsey around this time, but her feelings for him never went as deep as his for her, and they never actually dated. The two remained close, even more so after Doug's status as a mutant was revealed and he joined the New Mutants under the codename Cypher. They remained friends until his death some time later.

=== Possessed by Ogun ===
During the 1984–1985 Kitty Pryde and Wolverine miniseries, Kitty is possessed by a demon, the ninja Ogun. Ogun psychically bestows upon Kitty a virtual lifetime of martial arts training. Kitty was brainwashed by Ogun into becoming a ninja assassin, and was sent to attack Wolverine. Kitty is able to resist Ogun's influence with Wolverine's help, and the two form a strong teacher/student bond, which helps them in vanquishing Ogun. Kitty returns to the X-Men, no longer the innocent girl they once knew, and officially adopts the codename Shadowcat.

=== Morlock Massacre ===
While trying to save Rogue, Kitty was badly injured by Harpoon's energy spear during the Mutant Massacre story arc, in the massacre of the Morlocks, with the result that she lost control of her power and was stuck in an intangible state and could not regain her solidity. She was rushed to Muir Island along with other surviving casualties of the Massacre to be tended to by Moira MacTaggert. MacTaggert was able to keep Kitty's condition from deteriorating to the point where she completely lost physical substance and ceased to exist, but was not able to do any more to help her.

At this time, Kitty's natural state was to be intangible. Where she once had to make a conscious effort to phase, she could now only maintain her solidity through an act of conscious will. The X-Men went to Reed Richards, Mister Fantastic of the Fantastic Four, for aid, but Richards initially refused because he was not sure he would be able to help.

Having nowhere else to go, the X-Men turned to Richards' enemy Doctor Doom. This created a moral dilemma for both the X-Men and the Fantastic Four, and both teams fought each other because the Fantastic Four were trying to stop the treatment while the X-Men were determined to save Kitty's life. In the end, both the personal crisis of the Fantastic Four and the life of Shadowcat were saved after Franklin Richards, with the help of Lockheed, brought both teams to their senses. Kitty has since recovered from this state and now has full control over her power again.

=== Excalibur ===
Among the others injured and brought to Muir Isle were Colossus and Nightcrawler, although Colossus left the United Kingdom shortly after being released from MacTaggert's care to join the rest of the X-Men on their mission to battle the Adversary. The X-Men sacrificed their lives to defeat the Adversary, the battle and their sacrifice was televised and broadcast across the world. The X-Men were resurrected later in the same issue, unknown to the world at large, but chose to keep a low profile and perpetuate the belief that they were still dead. This strategy was enforced to more effectively fight their enemies. This meant avoiding contact with friends and family, including Kitty. Thinking the X-Men were dead, Kitty and Nightcrawler joined Rachel Summers, Captain Britain, and Meggan to form the Britain-based team Excalibur following an adventure in which they saved Rachel from Technet. For a brief time, Kitty studied at St. Searle's School for Girls in Britain. During her time with Excalibur, Kitty developed a crush on Professor Alistaire Stuart which went unreciprocated since Alistaire was attracted to Rachel. Later, she was romantically involved with former Black Air agent Pete Wisdom. At some point Kitty was recruited by the international law enforcement agency S.H.I.E.L.D. to repair the computer system of their flying headquarters. Kitty discovered the problem was due to Ogun's spirit having infiltrated the computer system, and with the aid of Wolverine, she managed to purge Ogun's presence. During this time, Kitty was attracted to a S.H.I.E.L.D. intern her own age, and this made her begin to doubt her relationship with Wisdom. Soon after, she broke off their relationship.

=== Back to the X-Men ===
Kitty Pryde on the cover of X-Treme X-Men #26 (July 2003); art by Salvador Larroca

After Excalibur's dissolution, Shadowcat, Nightcrawler, and Colossus return to the X-Men. While returning, they faced a group of imposters following Cerebro, in the guise of Professor X. While tracking Mystique, she stumbles onto prophetic diaries that belonged to Irene Adler, a precognitive. During the six-month gap, Kitty visited Genosha. Whatever she experienced there is unknown (although presumably connected to her father, living on Genosha at the time), but it had a profound effect on her. She cut her hair and began to act rebelliously, also using one of Wolverine's bone claws broken off during battle as a weapon. Kitty remained with the X-Men for a while before leaving after the apparent death of Colossus. Trying to give herself a normal life, she attended the University of Chicago. During this time, her father was killed when Cassandra Nova's Sentinels destroyed Genosha. Kitty later finds a recording of his death due to exploring footage of the attack. She is also kidnapped by William Stryker, but the X-Treme X-Men team helped her escape, and she assisted them on several missions.

At the start of Joss Whedon's run on Astonishing X-Men, Kitty once again rejoins the X-Men, despite having extreme reservations about working with the former White Queen, given their history. This was the primary reason why Frost herself wanted Kitty on the team, as a sort of "safety" should Frost ever revert to type. Frost reasoned that the person who trusted her least would be most likely to spot such behavior. On one of the team's first missions, Shadowcat discovered Colossus was alive. After some initial awkwardness, Kitty and Colossus resumed dating.

Kitty Pryde appeared alongside Colossus in the "Blinded by the Light" arc in X-Men. They are the two X-Men left to look after the students while the rest of the X-Men leave for Mystique's home in Mississippi to check up on Rogue, during which they are ambushed by the Marauders. Kitty and Colossus, meanwhile, attempt to protect the students from a faction of the Marauders led by Exodus. It is revealed over the course of the story that Kitty, worried of the Destiny Diaries' safety, devised a plan with Cyclops and Emma Frost to hide them and have Emma wipe the location from her mind. The location could only be revealed by a code word spoken to Kitty. The arc concludes with a battle between Iceman and Cannonball against the Marauders for the diaries, during which they are destroyed by Gambit.

In the "Torn" arc, the latest incarnation of the Hellfire Club begin an assault on Xavier's School. Kitty fulfilled the role that Emma Frost envisioned, personally taking down Frost and imprisoning her, only to fall under a telepathic delusion created by Hellfire member Perfection, who claimed to be the true, unreformed Emma Frost. Under this delusion, Kitty was made to believe that she and Colossus had conceived a child, which was later taken away by the X-Men because its potential mutant abilities were supposedly dangerous. Kitty reacts in the delusion by attempting to rescue the child from a near-inescapable "box" in the depths of the school, unaware that in reality she is freeing an alien entity, Stuff, who contains the trapped consciousness of Cassandra Nova, the apparent ringleader of this new Hellfire Club. A newly awakened Cyclops revealed that the new Hellfire Club, including Perfection and Nova, are actually mental projections created by a piece of Nova's consciousness; which became lodged in Emma's mind during the X-Men's last confrontation with her, playing on her survivor's guilt over the Genoshan massacre, and utilizing Emma's telepathy to both confound the X-Men and orchestrate her (Nova's) escape from the Stuff body. As Cyclops killed the mental projections, Emma tried to force Kitty to kill her to get rid of Nova. Undeterred, Nova switched her focus to attempt to transfer her mind to Hisako Ichiki. It appears that Nova did not succeed, as the team was transported to S.W.O.R.D.'s air station en route to Breakworld.

=== Breakworld ===
As the team prepares to end the confrontation with Ord, the team splits up—with Kitty on the team appointed to stop the missile pointed at Earth. Kitty phases into the missile to disrupt its circuitry noting that it is composed of the same material as the rest of Breakworld, a material that is difficult and exhausting for her to phase through. After phasing for a mile into the missile, Kitty finds the center only to discover it empty. The missile is fired, causing Kitty to pass out inside of it as Beast discovers too late that due to its shape, trajectory, and lack of internal circuitry, Breakworld's weapon is not a missile, but a bullet. As the bullet hurtles toward Earth, Kitty lies unconscious within it.

As the situation becomes increasingly dire, Emma establishes mental contact with Kitty, reassuring her that she will come out of this fine, though it eventually becomes clear to both that the situation will be grim. Kitty and Emma come to an understanding and reconciliation, Emma stating that she never wanted something like this to happen to her. Kitty then phases the bullet through Earth, but is trapped within. At the end of Giant-Size Astonishing X-Men, Scott Summers mentions that Doctor Strange, Reed Richards, and some "top men" tried to save her, but believe she has fused to the bullet, as it continues to hurtle through space. Whether she is alive or dead is unknown, though the X-Men consider her lost to them.

It was later confirmed by Abigail Brand that Kitty Pryde was still alive within the bullet, but because the bullet's design would harden as time went on, it would become increasingly difficult to break the bullet open.

=== Return ===
After the X-Men move to the island of Utopia, Magneto arrives on the island professing his desire to join and support the X-Men in their effort to unite the world's remaining mutants. The X-Men reluctantly let him stay, remaining wary of him despite his efforts to gain their trust. In a final bid to gain their trust, Magneto focuses his powers, attempting to divert the interstellar path of the metal bullet Kitty is trapped in and bring her home to Earth. Meanwhile, inside the bullet, Kitty is revealed to still be alive. Unbeknownst to the others, Magneto had encountered the bullet earlier while attempting to regain his powers with the High Evolutionary and surmised that Kitty was inside. Despite this and the High Evolutionary's apparent ability to retrieve the bullet and Kitty, Magneto chose to focus on regaining his powers, secretly keeping tabs on the bullet until his decision to draw it back to Earth. During her time trapped inside the bullet, Kitty keeps herself and the bullet phased to avoid collisions with any inhabited objects in its path.

Magneto brings Kitty Pryde safely down to Earth by cracking the bullet in two and levitating Kitty to the ground. When she and Colossus try to touch, it is revealed that she is trapped in her intangible form, unable to speak, and the X-Men place her in a protective chamber similar to the one used for her following the events of the Mutant Massacre. How Kitty survived her time in the bullet is unclear to the X-Men's science team, where the X-Men discover that all her bodily functions halted. An analysis by Kavita Rao hypothesizes that Kitty created an intense muscle memory to keep herself and the bullet phased and has "forgotten" how to un-phase.

During a conversation with Colossus, with Emma Frost acting as the psi-conduit, Kitty picks up Emma's stray thoughts on killing the captive Sebastian Shaw, to prevent Namor from discovering she previously lied to him. While disgusted at Emma's intentions, Kitty offers a compromise. Due to her current ghost state, she is the perfect tool for making Shaw disappear.

In a storyline in Uncanny X-Men, the Breakworlders make their way to Earth. During the conflict between the Breakworlder Kr'uun and the X-Men, Kitty is killed and resurrected by Kr'uun's mate in an alien ritual, which results in her powers returning to normal.

=== Regenesis ===
Shortly thereafter, Kitty breaks up with Colossus, and decides to return with Wolverine to Westchester to open the Jean Grey School for Higher Learning. In Wolverine and the X-Men #4, she appears to be suddenly pregnant, but the pregnancy was revealed to be a Brood infestation, and it was swiftly dealt with by a team of X-Men. Since returning to Westchester, Kitty has shared several kisses with Iceman. During the events of Avengers vs. X-Men, Kitty does not take a side, but instead decides to stay at the school to work with the students. Once Bobby returned from working with the X-Men after realizing that the Phoenix had corrupted them, he and Kitty finally decide to go on a date.

=== All-New X-Men ===
After Beast brings the original five X-Men into the future to stop Cyclops in the present, Kitty volunteers to take responsibility for the temporally relocated X-Men while they work to undo this dark future. This soon puts her at odds with the rest of her team as they believed the original five should go back to their own time to prevent any damage to the space-time continuity. Eventually, this leads Kitty to take the decision of abandoning the school with the time-displaced X-Men and join Cyclops's X-Men at the New Xavier School. During the first few weeks at the New Xavier School, Jean Grey is abducted by the Shi'ar Empire to stand trial for her future self's crimes. Kitty and the time-displaced X-Men team up with the Guardians of the Galaxy and succeed in rescuing Jean from the Shi'ar. At the conclusion of the storyline, Kitty begins a long-distance, flirtatious relationship with Starlord, Peter Quill.

=== The Black Vortex ===
In the following weeks, Kitty's relationship with Peter Quill evolves more and more as they develop stronger feelings for each other every day. At one point, Quill gets captured during one of their dates and she has no option but to go to his rescue, despite her fear of space as a result of her being trapped on the giant space bullet. After rescuing Peter, she decides to stay in space with him. Then, Kitty convinces Peter to steal a powerful artifact called the Black Vortex from his father J'son. Soon, they find themselves being chased by J'son's assassination squad, the Slaughter Lords. In despair, they request the aid of the X-Men and the Guardians of the Galaxy to protect the Vortex. After a few of their own friends cannot resist the temptation and submit to the Vortex, betray the team, and escape with the artifact; the team splits and Kitty stays in Spartax to help an orphanage. She is encased in amber after Thane (who was allied with J'son) freezes the whole planet along with the people inside it; but thanks to her phasing powers, she manages to get out of the amber. Then the Brood attacks Spartax, planning to use every encased person to lay eggs and create an army of Brood to start invading other planets and conquering them. Kitty feels the only way to stop them is by submitting to the Vortex herself as she's the only one who can resist the cosmic corruption. She reluctantly submits and becomes a being of unlimited power. After being reminded of the love between her and Peter Quill, she goes back and phases all the amber that encased Spartax, along with the Broods trying to infect the people, and sends them all to another dimension. Kitty does not give up the cosmic power but admits to Peter that she is afraid of it. Peter promises her that he will never abandon her no matter how much she changes. Then, Peter kneels and proposes marriage to Kitty. She, with tears in her eyes, accepts. Later when Star-Lord is declared Emperor of Spartax she is told she will become the first lady of Spartax.

=== Guardians of the Galaxy ===
Kitty takes on the mantle of Star-Lord and joins the Guardians of the Galaxy in Peter Quill's place so he can take on his royal duties. When Hala the Accuser massacres Spartax in an attempt to make Quill pay for J'son's actions against her people, she initially lays waste to the capitol and overpowers the Guardians. After the Guardians regroup and formulate a strategy to defeat her, Kitty manages to partially phase Hala into the ground so the rest of the Guardians can knock her out and separate her from her weapon. After Quill loses his title as king he and Kitty end up on a mission with the rest of the Guardians on a concentration camp prison planet owned by the Badoon after Gamora gave them information on it so they can free Angela. Once there, Kitty has a personal reaction upon seeing the prisoners and makes it her mission to liberate everyone there and defeat the captors, as it reminds her of Nazi concentration camps. After Quill gets captured and sentenced to death in an arena battle, Kitty finds and kills one of the Badoon leaders by phasing his heart out of his body. When Captain Marvel summons the Guardians to Earth to help her address Tony Stark, Kitty learns that Thanos is a prisoner on Earth and tries to convince Quill to tell Gamora. When fighting starts Kitty woefully realizes that some of her former students are on Tony Stark's side instead of fighting with Captain Marvel. During the battle the Guardians' ship was destroyed, effectively stranding them on Earth. After helping the Guardians stop Thanos from leading an invasion from the Negative Zone the Guardians are given a new ship; however, Kitty decides to stay on Earth and ends her time with the Guardians and Quill.

=== Leading the X-Men ===
Kitty on the cover of X-Men Gold #3. Art by Marc Guggenheim and Ardian Syaf.

Upon returning to Earth, Kitty hopes to finally regain a semblance of a normal life but ends up approached by Storm, who informs Kitty of everything the X-Men have gone through while Kitty was away. Storm announces to Kitty that she intends to step down as leader of the X-Men due to the guilt that she feels for leading the X-Men to war and offers Kitty her position. After touring X-Haven and seeing how much things have changed and how much things need to change for the better, Kitty agrees to lead the X-Men as long as Storm remains on the team. Her next act is to relocate the mansion from Limbo to Central Park, New York so the X-Men can refocus on being part of the world instead of fearing it under the belief that if the X-Men truly are to be seen as heroes, then they need to actually live in the world that they are trying to save instead of constantly worrying about their own survival.

Under Kitty's new leadership, the X-Men go through some small changes to shed their history and make new names for themselves, such as convincing Rachel Summers to change her code name to Prestige and renaming the mansion as The Xavier Institute for Mutant Education and Outreach. Kitty learns first-hand how hard it is to balance leading the X-Men as well as managing the mansion when there are many political factors trying to deliberately get in the way of the X-Men. She also begins to have awkward one-on-one moments with Colossus; they try to remain friends, but given their long history their interactions swiftly become complicated. Kitty's first case as field leader of the X-Men sees her and her team taking on a new Brotherhood of Mutants. After discovering that an outspoken anti-mutant politician brainwashed this new Brotherhood to work for her to publicly discredit mutants, Kitty threatened to expose her if she continued exploiting mutants for her own personal gain.

== Powers and abilities ==
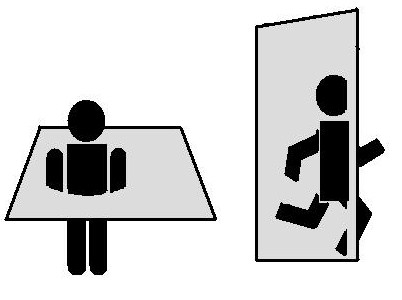
Physics professor James Kakalios has attempted to use quantum mechanics to explain Kitty Pryde's "phasing" power. He has described it as an ability to control her own "macroscopic quantum wave function, increasing her tunneling probability to near 100 percent at will."

Kitty is a mutant with the ability to pass through solid matter by passing her atomic particles through the spaces between the atoms of the object through which she is moving. In this way she and the object through which she is passing can temporarily merge without interacting, and each is unharmed when Shadowcat has finished passing through the object. This process is called "phasing" or quantum tunneling and it renders her almost completely intangible to physical touch. Shadowcat passes through objects at the same speed at which she is moving before entering them. Originally unable to breathe while inside an object, she can now phase through solid objects without needing to hold her breath such as when traveling underground or phasing buildings through the Earth’s surface. The use of her abilities also interferes with electrical systems by disrupting the flow of electrons from atom to atom when she passes through, including the bio-electric systems of living bodies if she concentrates in the right way. This typically causes machines to malfunction or be destroyed, and can induce shock and unconsciousness in living beings.

Using her power began as an optional ability, but for a period (over ten years of published comics, approximately two years in-continuity) Kitty existed in a naturally "phased" state, and had to consciously choose to become solid. Kitty has returned to her original form and is normally solid and must choose to use her power. While phasing, she does not physically walk on surfaces, but rather interacts with the molecules of air above them, allowing her to ascend and descend, causing her to seemingly walk on air. While phased, she is immune to most physical attacks and has some resistance to telepathy as her psyche may reside in other dimensions from where she phases. The density of some materials (such as adamantium) can prove deleterious to her phasing, causing her to be severely disoriented or experience pain if she tries to pass through them. Some energy attacks also prove problematic for Kitty. For example an energy blast fired by Harpoon, a member of the Marauders, caused her to lose her capacity to become and stay fully tangible for months. Magic and magical beings can harm her in her phased state, as demonstrated in a battle with a N'Garai demon whose claws left no visible marks but caused Kitty severe pain as they passed through her intangible body.

Kitty can extend her powers to phase other people and objects so long as they establish and maintain physical contact with her. She readily extends this to her own clothing, and has been shown to affect objects with mass up to that of a small truck. She has threatened to leave people phased into a wall, and used her power offensively to harm the Technarch Magus, and Danger.

Kitty's powers appear to have increased over the years. During an X-Treme X-Men story arc, she phases out of sync with Earth's rotation to move from one place in the world (east or west) to another seemingly instantaneously. At the climax of Astonishing X-Men, Kitty phases a 10 mi (16 km) long "bullet" composed of super-dense alien metals through the entire planet Earth. This feat caused her considerable strain and she was unable to phase out of the bullet. Originally, Kitty found it difficult to impossible to phase only part of her body at a time. In the Days of Future Past story arc, she is possessed by her older future self, allowing her to solidify only her shoulder while phasing the rest of her body through Destiny—a feat explicitly beyond the 13-year-old Kitty's abilities. By contrast, the Kitty Pryde of Joss Whedon's run can punch and kick someone standing on the other side of a wall, selectively phasing and unphasing body parts as necessary. She can even run and leap through an armed opponent, grabbing their weapon as she passes by, which presumably requires her to solidify only the surface area of the palms of her hands and then immediately phase both her palms and the weapon.

Besides her mutant powers, Kitty is educated in applied technology and computer science, particularly in the design and use of computer hardware. She can pilot both piston and jet engine aircraft, as well as certain advanced interstellar vehicles. Kitty has also previously shown a unique ability to wield, and be harmed by, the Soulsword. After her possession by the ninja demon Ogun, she became a skilled hand-to-hand combatant, having been endowed with the equivalent of a lifetime of training in Japanese martial arts.

She is a professional-level dancer in both ballet and modern dance. She speaks fluent English, Japanese, Russian, and the royal and standard languages of the alien Shi'ar and Skrull, and has moderate expertise in Gaelic, Hebrew, and German.

Kitty also shares a mental/empathic connection with her pet dragon Lockheed; both she and the alien dragon can "sense" each other's presence at times and generally understand one another's thoughts and actions.

When Kitty used the Black Vortex, her powers were augmented to a cosmic scale making her a god-like being. She can phase through any material of any density and can even phase a planet out of Thane's amber, whereas in her normal state it is an extremely difficult task to simply phase herself out of the amber. She can also apparently transverse between the planes of the multiverse and is immune to the effects of space. Her appearance can be changed but her natural form appears to be rather gaseous in look.

== Reception ==
=== Critical reception ===
Chris Arrant of Newsarama referred to Kitty Pryde as one of the "best Marvel characters of all time", writing that her introduc=tion in the Claremont/Byrne era provided readers with a grounded, human perspective on the X-Men. David Uzumeri of ComicsAlliance described Kitty Pryde as a "fan-favorite phasing mutant" whose moral resolution made her a beloved character of the franchise. Eric Diaz of Nerdist called Kitty Pryde "smart and resourceful," highlighting her evolution from a 14-year-old into a capable leader. Kat Vendetti of ComicsVerse called Kitty Pryde a "protector and a hero," noting that Kitty's characterization proves she is a "natural and worthy leader" for the team.

Jonathan Thompson of Comic Book Resources referred to Kitty Pryde as the "heart and soul of the X-Men" and a symbol of female empowerment. Nick Abadzis of Tor.com viewed her phasing power as an "ingenious metaphor" for adolescent alienation and the desire to disappear. Thomas Bacon of Screen Rant observed that her "youthful perspective heightened the narrative impact" of classic storylines. Finally, Hilary Goldstein and Richard George of IGN characterized her as the "mutant everyman" whose strong-willed loyality made her one of the universe's most endearing figures.

=== Accolades ===
- In 2011 Wizard ranked Kitty Pryde 13th in their "200 Greatest Comic Characters of All Time" list.
- In 2011, IGN ranked Kitty Pryde 47th in their "Top 100 Comic Book Heroes" list.
- In 2011, IGN ranked Kitty Pryde 3rd in their "Top 25 X-Men" list.
- In 2014, Entertainment Weekly ranked Kitty Pryde 18th in their "Let's rank every X-Man ever" list.
- In 2017, ComicBook.com ranked Kitty Pryde 9th in their "10 Best X-Men" list.
- In 2018, Comic Book Resources ranked Kitty Pryde 7th in their "X-Men's Greatest Leaders" list.
- In 2018, Comic Book Resources ranked Kitty Pryde 12th in their "20 Most Powerful Mutants From The '80s" list.
- In 2018, GameSpot ranked Kitty Pryde 21st in their "50 Most Important Superheroes" list.
- In 2019, Comic Book Resources ranked Kitty Pryde 7th in their "10 Deadliest Ninja In Marvel Comics" list.
- In 2019, ComicBook.com ranked Kitty Pryde 20th in their "50 Most Important Superheroes Ever" list.
- In 2021, Comic Book Resources ranked Kitty Pryde 1st in their "10 Best Characters John Byrne Created" list.
- In 2021, Comic Book Resources ranked Kitty Pryde 9th in their "Marvel: 10 Smartest Female Characters" list.
- In 2021, Comic Book Resources ranked Kate Pryde 4th in their "10 Smartest Marvel Sidekicks" list.
- In 2021, Screen Rant ranked Kitty Pryde 1st in their "10 Strongest X-Men" list.
- In 2022, Newsarama ranked Kitty Pryde 3rd in their "The best Marvel characters of all time" list, 4th in their "Best X-Men members of all time" list, and 17th in their "The best female superheroes" list.
- In 2022, Comic Book Resources ranked Kitty Pryde 7th in their "10 Greatest X-Men, Ranked By Experience" list and 10th in their "X-Men's Greatest Leaders, Ranked By Experience" list.
- In 2022, Screen Rant ranked Kitty Pryde 1st in their "10 X-Men Characters, Ranked By Likability" list and 6th in their "Top 10 X-Men, Ranked by Fighting Skills" list.

== Literary reception ==
=== Volumes ===
==== Star-Lord and Kitty Pryde - 2015 ====
According to Diamond Comic Distributors, Star-Lord and Kitty Pryde #1 was the 39th best selling comic book in July 2015.

Brian Delpozo of ComicsVerse stated, "Star-Lord and Kitty Pryde #1 is one of the best issues to come out of Marvel's "Secret Wars" storyline so far. While its plot is a bit exposition heavy at the start, it eventually starts moving at a brisk pace, with very strong characters and fun art. If the darkness of most of Battleworld is bringing you down, I'd definitely recommend giving this issue a read." Levi Hunt of IGN gave Star-Lord and Kitty Pryde #1 a grade of 8.8 out of 10, writing, "Star-Lord and Kitty Pryde is a Disney movie of a comic—and that's not just because Peter Quill spends half the issue singing Little Mermaid songs. Peter is one of the only survivors of the 616-Marvel Universe still alive and now he is hiding out among God Doom's people, just trying not to get caught. Suddenly his life changes when he meets an alternate-reality version of his fiancé – Kitty Pryde. This book has all the hijinks, humor, and heart of Tangled or Aladdin, and that's just where the Disney comparisons start. Alti Firmansyah draws this book with all of expressive, big-eyed, joy of Disney minimalism. It perfectly complements Sam Humphries's wonderful story and makes for an enjoyable read for (almost) all ages."

== Other versions ==
Shadowcat in Generation Next #1. Art by Chris Bachalo.

In addition to her mainstream incarnation, Kitty Pryde has been depicted in other fictional universes.

=== Age of Apocalypse ===
In Age of Apocalypse, Kitty was forcibly recruited into Apocalypse's army after her parents were killed. Magneto puts Shadowcat under Weapon X's training, hoping to turn her into the X-Men's assassin, and she is given artificial claws to better imitate her teacher's fighting style. After the fallout between Colossus and Magneto, Shadowcat sides with Colossus, whom she has married. Instead of leaving the fight against Apocalypse altogether, the couple become the teachers of Generation Next. Shadowcat assists the team in rescuing Illyana Rasputin from the Seattle Core, but is killed by Colossus in his ruthless obsession to protect Illyana.

=== Days of Future Past ===
In the Days of Future Past timeline (Earth-811), Kate Pryde attempts to go back in time to prevent the assassination of Senator Robert Kelly by Mystique and the Brotherhood of Mutants. She succeeds, only to create a separate timeline where the events of her past still come to pass. Captured by Sentinels, Kate escapes by phasing through her inhibitor collar and falls into a time warp, transferring her consciousness into a robotic body known as Widget. After a few adventures in that timeline, mostly in company with her Earth-616 counterpart's team Excalibur, Kate regains her memory and returns to her original timeline, where she reprograms the ruling Sentinels to protect life.

Cat, after "declawing" an alternative James Howlett. Art by Michael Golden.

=== Exiles ===
A version of Kitty Pryde codenamed Cat appears in Exiles as a member of the epoynmous team. Prior to joining the Exiles, this version of Kitty was recruited by Emma Frost as an agent of the Hellfire Club. Cat's skill with using her powers means she is not tied to any dimension and can see through various realities, including those of the mind (for instance, seeing the various personalities in Sage's mind as "ghosts" surrounding her). Her arrival in the Crystal Palace and connection to its computers has increased this, giving her the ability to "cascade" through different alternative versions of herself, altering her appearance and details of her powers.

=== Earth-597 ===
In Earth-597, an alternative universe where World War II was won by Nazi Germany, Kitty is forced to serve as Shadowcat alongside Nightcrawler, Meggan, and Hauptmann Englande as a member of the Lightning Force (a counterpart of Excalibur), made a virtual slave because of her Jewish heritage. She is easily identified by her shaved head and the Star of David tattooed on her forehead. It is indicated that this Shadowcat is a true ghost, raised from the dead by a combination of science and magic. This Shadowcat can disrupt life force by phasing, knocking others unconscious.

=== Pirate Kitty ===
Kitty tells Illyana a bedtime story and casts herself as the pirate captain of the Abdul Alhazred. Unlike her mainstream counterpart, she did not have any mutant powers and wore a classic pirate outfit which also included her Star of David necklace. Initially depicted as fictitious, this version of Kitty was later revealed to exist in an alternate universe.

=== Professor W's X-Men ===
In the native universe of Exiles member Nocturne, Kitty is a senior member of the X-Men led by Nightcrawler. She is a teacher and Nocturne refers to her as "Aunt Kate". During a fight with Apocalypse, Kitty is exposed to a machine that reverts her to a younger stage of her life when she had only been with the X-Men a few weeks. Nocturne helps Kitty fit into the school and becomes her best friend.

=== Secret Wars (2015) ===
During the Secret Wars storyline, a version of Kitty named Kitten resides on Battleworld. In this reality, Kitten is a martial artist who joins Callisto's band of outcasts after being expelled from her school for attempting a forbidden technique, a side effect of which left her intangible. Kitten and her fellow outcasts became pupils of Shang-Chi, the exiled son of Emperor Zheng Zu.

=== Spider-Gwen ===
On Earth-65, Kitty is an agent of S.H.I.E.L.D.'s Black Ops department, where she works closely with Wolverine to keep him in check and to help him fight his immortal curse. Like the Age of Apocalypse version, she also wields artificial claws on her wrists. Kitty works with Logan out of guilt, as Stryker forced her to use her powers to subject Logan to the Weapon X experiment.

=== Ultimate Marvel ===
Ultimate Kitty Pryde, with the costume designed by Stuart Immonen in the Ultimate Spider-Man comic book

An alternate universe iteration of Kitty Pryde appears in the Ultimate Marvel imprint. This version enrolled at the Xavier Institute after her mother, worried about her mutation, sought help from Charles Xavier. Initially not allowed to partake in the X-Men's missions, Kitty soon rebels against this and joins the X-Men as their youngest member. She idolizes Spider-Man and has a crush on him; she even dates Peter Parker for a time. After a fierce argument with Professor Xavier concerning Peter's secret identity, Kitty leaves the X-Men and enrolls in Peter's school. Their relationship is strained after their romantic involvement as superheroes becomes publicly known, making it impossible for them to date anymore in their civilian identities, and eventually comes to an end when Peter realizes he cannot get over his feelings for Mary Jane.

Following the events of "Ultimatum" and the subsequent ban of public use of mutant powers, Kitty assumes the identity of Shroud. Kitty also discovers that she can also decrease the space between her atoms to make herself super-dense, giving her superhuman strength and durability.

=== X-Men Forever ===
In the X-Men Forever series, Kitty and Nightcrawler have left Excalibur and rejoined the X-Men after the events of X-Men #1-3. Of the X-Men, she undergoes the most drastic changes from the events of X-Men Forever #1. (Note: This is excepting Storm, with her setup to betrayal apparently predating the issue.) During a battle with Fabian Cortez, she phases through Wolverine while he is being affected by Cortez's power. This drives her powers haywire as well, and she ends up with one of Wolverine's claws in her wrist. Following these events, Kitty develops similar abilities to Wolverine, including a healing factor, enhanced senses, and retractable claws on her left hand, while retaining her intangibility. She has also begun to take on Logan's personality and memories.

=== X-Men: Misfits ===
In the manga story X-Men: Misfits, Kitty is the newest and only female student of the all-male Xavier School for Gifted Youngsters, which is now experimenting with having a co-ed student body. As the sole girl, she becomes the center of attention and attraction for the rest of the students. She becomes a member and the mascot of the elitist fraternity, The Hellfire Club, and has a short-lived romantic relationship with the school troublemaker Pyro.

=== X-Men: The End ===
In the X-Men: The End future, Kitty Pryde becomes the mayor of Chicago and then President of the United States. She has three children: her eldest daughter, named Meredith, and twins 10 years younger than Meredith, Sara and Doug, with an unnamed partner who died protecting her from an assassination attempt.

== In other media ==
=== Television ===
- Kitty Pryde appears in Spider-Man and His Amazing Friends. She appears as Sprite in the episode "The X-Men Adventure" and as Ariel in the episode "The Education of a Superhero".
- Kitty Pryde appears in X-Men: Pryde of the X-Men, voiced by Kath Soucie. This version is the newest member of the X-Men. Due to the pilot's failure, Pryde fell out of prominence in the comics and was replaced with Jubilee in X-Men: The Animated Series.
- Kitty Pryde as Shadowcat appears in X-Men: Evolution, voiced by Maggie Blue O'Hara. This version is a "teenybopper" and member of the X-Men who develops a relationship with Avalanche over the course of the series.
- Kitty Pryde as Shadowcat appears in Wolverine and the X-Men, voiced by Danielle Judovits. This version was a student at the Xavier Institute before the X-Mansion was destroyed and Professor X and Jean Grey disappeared under mysterious circumstances. A year later, Wolverine re-recruits Pryde into the X-Men.
- Kitty Pryde as Shadowcat makes non-speaking appearances in The Super Hero Squad Show.

=== Film ===
- Kitty Pryde makes a cameo appearance in X-Men (2000), portrayed by Sumela Kay.
- Kitty Pryde makes a cameo appearance in X2, portrayed by Katie Stuart. This version is a student of the Xavier Institute and roommate of Siryn, whose powers she is partially immune to.
- Kitty Pryde appears in X-Men: The Last Stand, portrayed by Elliot Page. She serves as a romantic rival to Rogue while competing for Bobby Drake's affections and joins the X-Men in protecting Leech from the Brotherhood of Mutants.
- Kitty Pryde appears in X-Men: Days of Future Past, portrayed again by Elliot Page. As of a dystopian future controlled by the Sentinels, she has developed the ability to send a person's consciousness into their past self, which she uses to help the surviving X-Men combat the Sentinels. She later uses this ability to send Logan's mind back in time to his past self in 1973 to avert the Sentinels' creation as his mind is the only one capable of surviving the mental rigors of the journey. In the "Rogue Cut" of the film, Rogue takes over for Pryde in keeping Logan's mind in the past after Pryde is injured. During the final battle, Pryde saves Magneto from being killed by Sentinels. After Logan's mission succeeds and the timeline is successfully altered in both versions of the film, Pryde becomes a teacher at the Xavier Institute alongside Colossus.
- In January 2018, a Kitty Pryde solo film was announced to be in development at 20th Century Fox, with Tim Miller attached as the director and Brian Michael Bendis as the writer. However, following Disney's purchase of 21st Century Fox in March 2019, Fox executive Emma Watts described The New Mutants as the final film in the X-Men film series, which brought development on the Kitty Pryde film to an end.

=== Video games ===
- Kitty Pryde appears as a non-player character (NPC) in X-Men (1992). In the 2010 re-release, she is voiced by Mela Lee.
- Kitty Pryde as Shadowcat appears as a playable character in X-Men II: The Fall of the Mutants.
- Kitty Pryde as Shadowcat appears as an NPC in X-Men Legends II: Rise of Apocalypse, voiced by Kim Mai Guest.
- Kitty Pryde as Shadowcat appears in X-Men: The Official Game, voiced again by Kim Mai Guest.
- Kitty Pryde as Shadowcat appears as a playable character in Marvel Super Hero Squad Online, voiced by Tara Strong.
- Kitty Pryde appears as a playable character in Marvel: Avengers Alliance.
- Kitty Pryde appears as a playable character in Uncanny X-Men: Days of Future Past.
- Kitty Pryde appears as a playable character in Marvel Heroes, voiced again by Danielle Judovits.
- Kitty Pryde appears as a playable character in Marvel Future Fight.
- Kitty Pryde appears as a playable character in Marvel Puzzle Quest.
- Kitty Pryde appears as a playable character in Marvel Strike Force.

=== Merchandise ===
- Kitty Pryde has received numerous action figures in the Marvel Legends line, including her All-New X-Men outfit in the 2016 Juggernaut wave, her Age of Apocalypse outfit in the 2021 Age of Apocalypse Colossus wave, and her blue Shadowcat outfit in the 2022 Excalibur 3-pack.
- Kitty Pryde has received multiple Heroclix figures.
- Kitty Pryde has received multiple Pop! figures by Funko, all featuring Lockheed.
- Kitty Pryde and Lockheed received a Q-Fig figure from Quantum Mechanix.

=== Miscellaneous ===
- Kitty Pryde as Shadowcat appears in the Astonishing X-Men motion comic, initially voiced by Eileen Stevens and later by Laura Harris.

== Collected editions ==
Several of Kitty Pryde's earlier adventures were collected in paperback form.

| Title | Material collected | Publication date | ISBN |
|---|---|---|---|
| Kitty Pryde and Wolverine | Kitty Pryde and Wolverine #1–6 | June 2008 | 0-7851-3089-6 |
