= Destiny (Irene Adler) =

Marvel Comics character

Irene Adler Destiny
- Textless variant cover of A.X.E.: Judgment Day #5 (September 2022). Art by Lucas Werneck.

Publication information
- Publisher: Marvel Comics
- First appearance: Uncanny X-Men #141 (October 21, 1980)
- Created by: Chris Claremont (writer); John Byrne (artist)

In-story information
- Full name: Irene Adler
- Species: Human mutant
- Place of origin: Salzburg, Austria
- Team affiliations: Brotherhood of Mutants; Freedom Force; Quiet Council of Krakoa
- Abilities: Precognition

Destiny is a fictional character appearing in American comic books published by Marvel Comics. Created by writer Chris Claremont and artist/co-writer John Byrne, the character first appeared in Uncanny X-Men #141, published on October 21, 1980.

Destiny's civilian identity is Irene Adler, a blind mutant with precognitive abilities that allow her to accurately predict future events. Initially, Destiny was depicted as an adversary of the X-Men and member of the Brotherhood of Mutants, led by her wife Mystique, the two having raised Rogue together. Although originally portrayed as one of the X-Men's enemies, in other storylines Destiny has functioned as an ally.

Decades after her death, Destiny was resurrected by Mystique during the "Krakoan Age" in 2021. In this era, it was confirmed that Destiny was the Irene Adler featured in Sherlock Holmes stories (created by Sir Arthur Conan Doyle), her rivalry with Moira MacTaggert was established, and it was revealed she plays a pivotal role in the history and future of mutantkind. A 2023 storyline revealed it was Destiny who gave birth to the X-Men superhero Nightcrawler, rather than Mystique; the two conceived him after Mystique used her abilities to take on a male form. In 2024, Destiny and Mystique renewed their vows, marking the first depiction of a female same-sex wedding in Marvel Comics.

Destiny has received attention for her relationship with Mystique, being one of Marvel's earliest queer characters; their relationship has often received praise. Destiny has also garnered attention for the revelation of her status as Nightcrawler's mother, which was praised for adhering to Claremont's original design for the characters.

== Publication history ==
Created by writer Chris Claremont and artist/co-writer John Byrne, the character first appeared in The Uncanny X-Men #141 (Jan. 1981).

As far back as 1981, Claremont had intended Destiny to be the lover of Brotherhood of Mutants teammate Mystique, and for them to be Nightcrawler's biological parents, with Mystique taking the form of a man for the conception. However, at that time, the Comics Code Authority and Marvel policy prohibited the explicit portrayal of gay or bisexual characters. Destiny was simply referred to as the only member of the new Brotherhood that Mystique saw as a friend; all the other members being male and prone to arguing amongst each other.

Destiny died at the hands of Legion in a 1989 storyline in The Uncanny X-Men #255. In the 2000s (decade) series X-Treme X-Men, years after Destiny died it was revealed that she filled several diaries with the future history of mutantkind, and the search for these diaries was a main storyline in the series. She was resurrected with a techno-organic virus during the 2009 "Necrosha" storyline.

In November 2021, Marvel announced a new storyline titled "Destiny of X", which began in 2022 and features Destiny as one of its central characters. The Immortal X-Men by Kieron Gillen in November 2022 also explicitly established her as Irene Adler from Sherlock Holmes stories for the first time, with Holmes confirmed as having been Mystique.

In November 2023, Claremont's intended storyline of Mystique and Destiny being Nightcrawler's parents, with Mystique having morphed into a male body for the act of conception, was made canon.

== Fictional character biography ==
Irene Adler was born into a wealthy household in late 19th-century Salzburg, Austria. Although she was more accurate in predicting near-future events concerning her present environment, when her mutant powers of precognition initially emerged in adolescence, she worked tirelessly for thirteen months to record prophecies concerning the late 20th and early 21st centuries. Upon completing the thirteen and final volume, Irene was struck with physical blindness while her mind was haunted by disturbing images of uncertain meaning.

Traveling to London, she first met Mystique, who at the time lived as a man and engaged in detective work using the name "Sherlock Holmes". Destiny sought her help in understanding the precognitive visions recorded in her diaries. Revealing her knowledge that "Sherlock" was both a woman and a mutant, she enlisted her services in pursuit of two goals: the deciphering of her recorded prophecies and a mission to prevent the most terrifying of them from ever being fulfilled.

The two women would soon become lifelong friends and lovers but discovered that their set goals were difficult to achieve. Their abilities would easily allow them to achieve personal success but to shape the future was stated to be "next to impossible" as it would require "social engineering." Although they remained romantically involved for years to come, there were periods where they were separated from one another, allowing them both to have other romantic relationships and even families. Together, the two later raised adopted daughter Rogue in their home in fictional Caldecott County, Mississippi.

=== Brotherhood ===
Mystique and Destiny form the second Brotherhood of Mutants, a group of ideologically motivated terrorists. She attempted to assassinate Senator Robert Kelly with a crossbow, but was thwarted by the X-Men and taken into custody. Eventually, the members of Mystique's Brotherhood went to work for the United States government as Freedom Force in exchange for a pardon and protection from anti-mutant sentiment. While on a mission with Freedom Force to Muir Island to stop the Reavers, Destiny is killed by Legion.

=== The Books of Truth ===
When Destiny's mutant power first manifested, she filled several diaries called "The Books of Truth" with prophecies of the future that, when in the wrong hands, posed a major threat to humanity. After the events of "House of M", the diaries are sought out by Mister Sinister, who believed that a specific book contained information on the fate of mutants in the wake of Decimation. Exodus and his Acolytes attack the Xavier Institute, only to find forgeries of the books. The real diaries are hidden in Flint, Michigan by Shadowcat and Emma Frost, but are burned by Gambit before the Marauders or the X-Men can retrieve them.

=== Necrosha ===
After getting hold of the Transmode Virus during the Necrosha storyline, Selene resurrects Destiny to question her about the future. After telling Selene what she wants to hear, Destiny is taken back to her cell, where she telepathically contacts Blindfold by accident while trying to reach her foster daughter Rogue. After showing Blindfold she means no harm and saving her life from falling rubble caused by Warpath, she gives Blindfold information about Selene. After breaking contact, she realizes she made a grave mistake.

The mistake is revealed to be Proteus who is now in possession of Blindfold. Rogue, along with a group of X-Men go to Muir Island to battle Proteus, and it is through the combined efforts of Rogue, Magneto and Psylocke that he is defeated. Afterwards Destiny explains to Blindfold that she is not her mother, but rather a distant relative. Destiny then takes a moment to share a final good-bye with Rogue before leaving, apparently dying.

=== Dawn of X ===
Moira MacTaggert demands Professor X and Magneto to remove Mystique from the Quiet Council and erase Destiny's genetic and psychological data to prevent her resurrection. Mystique disguises herself as Magneto to acquire Destiny's psychological data from the Cradle on Island M, then assumes Professor X's identity to acquire Destiny's genetic data from Mister Sinister and get the Five to resurrect Destiny, who is voted into the Quiet Council.

=== Uncanny Spider-Man ===
During the time Nightcrawler operates as "Spinnenmann" (German for Spider-Man), an alternate identity used with Spider-Man's permission, he re-encounters Mystique, whose mind has been shattered by Professor X and who was left raving over her guilt of having lost Nightcrawler as a baby, and restores her using his Hopesword. Mystique then reveals that during her time as Christian Wagner's wife, she and Destiny, who was working as a household maid, decided to have a child together. When Wagner caught them in an intimate moment, Raven killed him and impersonated him until Kurt was born. When Mystique's real nature was revealed to the villagers, they went after the two women; Irene, having had a vision of Kurt's future role in thwarting Azazel, disappeared and enabled Margali Szardos to find and adopt Kurt. Years later, after having adopted Anna Marie, she and Mystique reunited, and to become a family for the girl, they asked Professor X to remove most of their memories of what happened in Bavaria.

== Powers and abilities ==
Destiny is a mutant with the ability to see future probabilities and interpret them to best select or manipulate what was likely to happen. This allowed her to compensate for her blindness by seeing where objects in her path would be. The accuracy of Destiny's ability to foresee the future decreases in direct proportion to the distance ahead in time.

She carried a small crossbow with her that she used offensively, and had good aim because she "saw" where it would land in her precognitive visions.

In Necrosha, Destiny was shown to utilize telepathic abilities as she mentally searched for Rogue (instead finding Blindfold) and then projecting her image into Blindfold's mind. This was explained later that she had fragments of the mutant Proteus inside her. After making physical contact with Blindfold, Proteus appeared to take full possession of Blindfold and vacate Destiny's body. As such, she may or may not still have telepathy.

== Reception ==
=== Critical reception ===
Alex Schlesinger of Screen Rant described Destiny and Mystique as "one of X-Men's most iconic couples of all time," writing, "What makes Irene and Raven's relationship so perfect for Pride Month is because it is so representational of how media has treated queer relationships for decades, constantly pushing them into the shadows and making them subtextual - a fate which Mystique and Destiny's relationship has survived and overcome." Samantha Puc of Newsarama called Destiny and Mystique's relationship one of the "most iconic LGBTQIA+ comics romances," writing, "Though it remains to be seen whether it's a good thing or a bad thing, longtime villains-turned-Krakoan politicians Mystique and Destiny are mutantkind's current power couple, following Destiny's resurrection and their upending of the Quiet Council's status quo in the recent Inferno limited series. And they've certainly earned their place as mutant matriarchs." Beat Staff of ComicsBeat wrote, "Mystique and Destiny have been written as lovers from the beginning. From their first appearances, the love and loyalty they felt for each other was so palpable that it has to date inspired fanfiction and critical commentary that takes their status as one of comics' most epic love stories as text. Wherever their story might go, Mystique and Destiny have always had the kind of love that transcends the thoughts, desires, and expectations of the outside world." Peter Eckhardt of CBR.com stated, "While the Marvel Universe has often changed around them, Destiny and Mystique's relationship has been a staple of comics. Together, the two have survived Sentinels, the X-Men, and alternate timelines. When she was killed, Mystique worked tirelessly to return her lover to life. Despite their apparent amorality, Destiny and Mystique's relationship is an inspiring part of Marvel Comics."

The storyline involving the revelation of Destiny as Nightcrawler's mother was positively received. George Marston of Newsarama was pleased that Marvel finally established Claremont's original backstory for the characters as canon. James Whitbrook of Gizmodo also praised the storyline for making "one of the greatest, often unspoken queer loves of X-Men comics [...] to be woven back through history as it [was] always intended to be".

=== Accolades ===
- In 2018, Nerdist ranked Destiny 6th in their "7 Unsung X-Men Heroes That Would Be Perfect for The Gifted" list.
- In 2021, Screen Rant ranked Destiny and Mystique 6th in their "10 Best Relationships in The X-Men Comics" list.
- In 2022, CBR.com ranked Destiny 4th in their "X-Men: 10 Queer and Awesome Mutants" list and 10th in their "10 Most Heroic Marvel Villains" list.

== Other versions ==
=== Age of Apocalypse ===
An alternate universe version of Destiny appears in Age of Apocalypse. This version is retired and lives in Avalon.

=== Millennial Visions ===
An alternate universe version of Destiny appears in X-Men: Millennial Visions as a member of the Brotherhood of Mutants.

== In other media ==
- Destiny appears in X-Men: Evolution, voiced by Ellen Kennedy. This version is Mystique's best friend who took care of Rogue during the latter's childhood. While it is never stated in the series, series character designer and director Steven E. Gordon confirmed that she was intended to have been Mystique's lover as in the comics.
- Destiny appears in X-Men Legends II: Rise of Apocalypse, voiced by Marsha Clark. This version is a former member of the Brotherhood of Mutants who relocated to Avalon in the Savage Land.

== See also ==
- LGBT themes in comics
