= Fall of X =

American comic books line

- Publisher: Marvel Comics
- Publication date: August 2023 – June 2024
- Genre: Superhero
- Main character(s): Alpha Flight; Brotherhood of Arakko; Iron Man; Orchis; Uncanny Avengers; X-Force; X-Men

Creative team
- Writer: Various
- Artist: Various

"Fall of X" is a 2023 relaunch of the X-Men line of American comic books published by Marvel Comics. It is the sequel to the "Destiny of X" publishing initiative, and is the final initiative in the Krakoan Age of the X-Men. The phase started with the third annual Hellfire Gala (July 2023) and culminated in the dual interconnected miniseries Fall of the House of X and Rise of the Powers of X (January 2024 – May 2024). The phase's final issue, X-Men #35 (legacy Uncanny X-Men #700) was released in June 2024. It is followed by the line relaunch X-Men: From the Ashes.

During the Fall of X, mutantkind's unparalleled growth and prosperity on the island nation Krakoa is threatened by the human supremacist organization Orchis.

== Publication history ==
The final phase was kicked off in the third annual Hellfire Gala (July 2023), which drastically altered the status quo of the series; this event was written by Gerry Duggan, with art by Adam Kubert, Luciano Vecchio, Matteo Lolli, Russell Dauterman, Javier Pina, R.B. Silva, Joshua Cassara, Kris Anka, and Pepe Larraz. In August 2023, Kieron Gillen commented that "part of the idea from Sins of Sinister to Fall of X was a lot of the small things going wrong. Obviously, what happened at the Hellfire Gala was big, but those events are based upon a series of small catastrophes that added up".

This phase then culminated in the dual interconnected miniseries Fall of the House of X and Rise of the Powers of X (January 2024 – May 2024); Duggan wrote Fall of the House of X with art by Werneck. Gillen continued as a main writer on multiple series in this phase such as Rise of the Powers of X with artist R.B. Silva, the ongoing Immortal X-Men conclusion and the limited series X-Men: Forever (March 2024) with artist Luca Maresca. Al Ewing concluded the ongoing X-Men Red with artist Yildiray Çinar.

The final issue X-Men #35 (legacy Uncanny X-Men #700) was published in June 2024; the end of the issue previews the next publishing initiative X-Men: From The Ashes with Xavier telepathically "witnessing mutants trying to re-integrate into human society and facing the same fear and hatred they always have" in the post-Krakoan Age. X-Men: The Wedding Special celebrated the relationship between Mystique and Destiny; while the issue was published in May 2024, Gillen commented that it "is set between the incoming and outgoing administrations - I'm both giving a little after credit scene to my Immortal X-Men stories, and setting up what's coming next".

In May 2024, X-Men group editor Jordan D. White commented that the anthology collection "format was shelved" and there would not be compiled trade paperbacks for Destiny of X or Fall of X.

== Titles ==
=== Prelude ===
Title	Writer	Artist	Colorist	Release date
Free Comic Book Day 2023 Avengers/X-Men	Gerry Duggan	Joshua Cassara; Javier Garrón	Marte Gracia; Morry Hollowell	May 6, 2023
X-Men: Before the Fall – Sons of X #1	Si Spurrier	Phil Noto		May 3, 2023
X-Men: Before the Fall – Mutant First Strike #1	Steve Orlando	Valentina Pinti	Frank William	June 7, 2023
X-Men: Before the Fall – Heralds of Apocalypse #1	Al Ewing	Luca Pizzari; Stefano Landini; Raphael Pimento	Ceci De La Cruz	June 28, 2023
X-Men: Before the Fall – Sinister Four #1	Kieron Gillen	Paco Medina	Edgar Delgado Protobunker's Fer Sifuentes-Sujo	July 5, 2023

=== Ongoing series ===
Title	Issues	Writer(s)	Artist(s)	Colourist(s)	Debut date	Conclusion date
X-Men (vol. 6)	#25–35	Gerry Duggan	Stefano Casseli; Javier Pina; Jim Towe; Joshua Cassara	Marte Gracia; Federico Blee; Guru-eFX	August 2, 2023	June 5, 2024
Immortal X-Men	#14–18	Kieron Gillen	Lucas Werneck	David Curiel	August 9, 2023	December 27, 2023
Ghost Rider (vol. 9)	#17	Benjamin Percy	Geoff Shaw	Rain Beredo	August 16, 2023	
X-Men: Red (vol. 2)	#14–18	Al Ewing	Yıldıray Çınar	Federico Blee	August 16, 2023	December 13, 2023
Invincible Iron Man (vol. 5)	#9–13	Gerry Duggan	Juan Frigeri	Bryan Valenza	August 23, 2023	December 6, 2023
X-Force (vol. 4)	#43–50	Benjamin Percy	Robert Gill	Guru-eFX	August 23, 2023	March 27, 2024
Wolverine (vol. 7)	#36–50	Benjamin Percy	Geoff Shaw; Juan Jose Ryp	Rain Beredo; Frank D'Armata	August 30, 2023	May 22, 2024

=== Limited series ===
Title	Issues	Writer(s)	Artist(s)	Colourist(s)	Debut date	Conclusion date
Astonishing Iceman	#1–5	Steve Orlando	Vincenzo Carratù	Javier Tartaglia	August 2, 2023	December 20, 2023
Children of the Vault	#1–4	Deniz Camp	Luca Maresca	Carlos Lopez	August 9, 2023	November 15, 2023
Alpha Flight (vol. 5)	#1–5	Ed Brisson	Scott Godlewski	Matt Milla	August 16, 2023	December 6, 2023
Dark X-Men (vol. 2)	#1–5	Steve Foxe	Jonas Scharf	Frank Martin	August 16, 2023	December 13, 2023
Uncanny Avengers (vol. 4)	#1–5	Gerry Duggan	Javier Garrón	Morry Hollowell	August 16, 2023	December 20, 2023
Jean Grey (vol. 2)	#1–4	Louise Simonson	Bernard Chang	Marcelo Maiolo	August 23, 2023	November 15, 2023
Realm of X	#1–4	Torunn Grønbekk	Diógenes Neves	Rain Beredo	August 23, 2023	November 29, 2023
Ms. Marvel: The New Mutant	#1–4	Iman Vellani; Sabir Pirzada	Carlos Gómez; Adam Gorham	Erick Arciniega	August 30, 2023	November 29, 2023
Uncanny Spider-Man	#1–5	Si Spurrier	Lee Garbett	Jordie Bellaire	September 20, 2023	December 20, 2023

=== One-shots ===
Title	Writer(s)	Artist(s)	Colourist(s)	Release date
X-Men: Hellfire Gala 2023 #1	Gerry Duggan	Adam Kubert; Luciano Vecchio; Matteo Lolli; Russell Dauterman; Javier Pina; R.B. Silva; Joshua Cassara; Kris Anka; Pepe Larraz	Rain Beredo; Ceci De La Cruz; Matthew Wilson; Erick Arciniega; Marte Gracia	July 26, 2023
Ghost Rider/Wolverine: Weapons of Vengeance Alpha #1	Benjamin Percy	Geoff Shaw	Rain Beredo	August 9, 2023
Ghost Rider/Wolverine: Weapons of Vengeance Omega #1	Benjamin Percy	Geoff Shaw	Rain Beredo	September 6, 2023
X-Men Blue: Origins #1	Si Spurrier	Marcus To; Wilton Santos	Ceci de la Cruz	November 29, 2023
Giant-Size X-Men (Vol. 2) #1	Ann Nocenti	Lee Ferguson	Bryan Hitch	May 8, 2024

=== Fall of the House of X ===
The Fall of X continued into 2024 across ongoing series and new limited series under a new banner, 'Fall of the House of X'.

Title	Issues	Writer(s)	Artist(s)	Colourist(s)	Debut date	Conclusion date
Fall of the House of X	#1–5	Gerry Duggan	Lucas Werneck	Brian Valenza	January 3, 2024	May 22, 2024
Rise of the Powers of X	#1–5	Kieron Gillen	R.B. Silva	David Curiel	January 10, 2024	May 29, 2024
Cable (vol. 5)	#1–4	Fabian Nicieza	Scot Eaton	Javier Tartaglia	January 17, 2024	May 1, 2024
Invincible Iron Man (vol. 4)	#14–20	Gerry Duggan	Andrea Di Vito	Bryan Valenza	January 17, 2024	July 17, 2024
X-Men (vol. 6)	#30–35	Gerry Duggan; Kieron Gillen; Al Ewing; Chris Claremont; Gail Simone; Jed MacKay	Phil Noto; Joshua Cassara; Lucas Werneck; Jerome Opeña; Stefano Caselli; Walter Simonson; Leinil Francis Yu		January 17, 2024	June 5, 2024
Resurrection of Magneto	#1–4	Al Ewing	Luciano Vecchio	David Curiel	January 24, 2024	April 11, 2024
Dead X-Men	#1–4	Steve Foxe	Vincenzo Carratù; Bernard Chang; Jonas Sharf	Frank Martin	January 31, 2024	April 18, 2024
Ms. Marvel: Mutant Menace	#1–4	Iman Vellani; Sabir Pirzada	Scott Godlewski	Erick Arciniega	March 6, 2024	June 5, 2024
X-Men: Forever	#1–4	Kieron Gillen	Luca Maresca	Federico Blee	March 20, 2024	May 15, 2024
Avengers (vol. 9)	#12–13	Jed MacKay	Francesco Mortarino	Federico Blee	April 3, 2024	April 24, 2024

== List of issues ==
=== Release order ===
Prelude series

1. Free Comic Book Day 2023 Avengers/X-Men
2. X-Men: Before the Fall – Sons of X #1
3. X-Men: Before the Fall – Mutant First Strike #1
4. X-Men: Before the Fall – Heralds of Apocalypse #1
5. X-Men: Before the Fall – Sinister Four #1

Fall of X commences

1. X-Men: Hellfire Gala 2023 #1
2. Astonishing Iceman #1
3. X-Men #25
4. Children of the Vault #1
5. Immortal X-Men #14
6. Alpha Flight #1
7. Dark X-Men #1
8. Uncanny Avengers #1
9. Deadpool #10
10. X-Men: Red #14
11. Invincible Iron Man #9
12. Jean Grey #1
13. Realm of X #1
14. X-Force #43
15. Ms. Marvel: New Mutant #1
16. Immortal X-Men #15
17. Uncanny Spider-Man #1
18. X-Men #26
19. Astonishing Iceman #2
20. X-Force #44
21. X-Men Red #15
22. Children of the Vault #2

== Related materials ==
Title	Issues	Writer(s)	Artist(s)	Colourist(s)	Debut date	Conclusion date
X-Men Unlimited Infinity Comic	#100-105	Steve Foxe; Stephanie Williams	Noemi Vettori	Pete Pantazis	August 14, 2023	September 18, 2023
X-Men Unlimited Infinity Comic	#106–111	Steve Foxe; Steve Orlando	Lynne Yoshii	Fer Sifuentes-Sujo	September 25, 2023	October 30, 2023
X-Men Unlimited Infinity Comic	#112–117	Steve Foxe; Steve Orlando	Guillermo Sanna	Java Tartaglia	November 6, 2023	December 11, 2023
X-Men Unlimited Infinity Comic	#118–120	Steve Foxe; Steve Orlando	Phillip Sevy	Ceci De La Cruz	December 18, 2023	January 1, 2024
X-Men Unlimited Infinity Comic	#121–142	Steve Foxe; Steve Orlando	Nick Roche; Phillip Sevy	Yen Nitro	January 8, 2024	June 3, 2024
X-Men: The Wedding Special	#1	Kieron Gillen; Tini Howard; Tate Brombal; Yoon Ha Lee; Wyatt Kennedy	Rachel Stott; Phillip Sevy; Emilio Pilliu; Stephen Byrne; Jenn St-Onge	Michael Bartolo; KJ Díaz; Irma Kniivila; Stephen Byrne; Brittany Peer	May 29, 2024	

== See also ==
- X-Men: From the Ashes
