= Immortal X-Men =

Comic book title

- Wraparound cover to Immortal X-Men #1 by Mark Brooks. From left to right: Lactuca, Colossus, Sobunar, Storm, Nightcrawler, Mister Sinister, Death, Exodus, Black King, White Queen, Red Queen, Lockheed, Xilo, Professor X, Mystique, Destiny.

Publication information
- Publisher: Marvel Comics
- Schedule: Monthly
- Format: Ongoing series
- Genre: Superhero
- Publication date: March 2022 – December 2023
- No. of issues: 18
- Main character: List: Askani Black King Black Priestess Colossus Cypher Destiny Doctor Stasis Enigma Exodus Hope Summers Krakoa Magneto Manifold Marvel Girl Mister Sinister Mother Righteous Mystique Nightcrawler Professor X Red Queen Storm White Queen

Creative team
- Written by: List: Kieron Gillen
- Penciller: List: Lucas Werneck Michele Bandini Paco Medina Juan Jose Ryp
- Inker: List: Lucas Werneck Michele Bandini Paco Medina Juan Jose Ryp
- Letterer: List: Clayton Cowles
- Colorist: List: David Curiel Dijjo Lima Erick Arciniega
- Editor: List: Jordan D. White Lauren Amaro

Immortal X-Men is an American superhero comic book series written by Kieron Gillen and published by Marvel Comics, which followed the Quiet Council of Krakoa during the Krakoan Age.

== Publication history ==
Writer-editor Jonathan Hickman and artist/co-plotter Pepe Larraz created the Quiet Council of Krakoa in House of X #6 (October 2019). The Council appeared in many comics in the Dawn of X and Reign of X relaunches, creating and enforcing the laws of Krakoa; prosecuting and delivering judgement on mutants accused of breaking those laws.

In March 2022, the council headlined Immortal X-Men as part of the Destiny of X relaunch. The series also served continuation of Inferno (vol. 2). It was written by Kieron Gillen and drawn by Lucas Werneck, building plot points for the event Sins of Sinister. After being briefly transformed into the Immoral X-Men limited series during the event, Immortal X-Men continued from issue #11.

The series then continued during the Fall of X phase which started with third annual Hellfire Gala (July 2023) event; during this event, the nation of Krakoa was destroyed in a multi-prong attack by Orchis which seemingly killed most of the populace. Gillen explained that the "Quiet Council was ruined" by the end of issue #13 but the events of the Hellfire Gala prevent them from announcing their mistakes. During the Fall of X phase, Gillen wanted to continue following the thread of it being "too late" for the Quiet Council to confess or recover from the problems they created – "that's what the book is about; failure of leadership. It's about these 12 people collapsing in on themselves". He highlighted the tensions between Xavier, Shaw, and Selene as "half the plot" and

Then there's this whole separate plot about, "What does leadership mean, and can we have a better form of it? What is government? What do we owe each other? Why do we protect each other?"

In December 2023, Issue #18 concluded the series. The four issue limited series X-Men: Forever (March – May 2024) by Gillen and artist Luca Maresca continues the narrative of Immortal X-Men and resolves lingering questions. When these issues were collected as a trade paperback, it was released as the fifth Immortal X-Men volume. Gillen commented that the X-Men: The Wedding Special (May 2024) "is set between the incoming and outgoing administrations – I'm both giving a little after credit scene to my Immortal X-Men stories, and setting up what's coming next".

In July 2024, as part of the X-Men: From the Ashes relaunch, a new version of the Quiet Council debuted in NYX (vol. 2) #1. This iteration consists of the Krakoan (formally Hellion), Empath, and four of the Stepford Cuckoos.

== Fictional team biography ==
=== Dawn & Reign of X ===
During the events of House of X, Professor X and Magneto establish the island of Krakoa as a sovereign homeland for mutants. They design the Quiet Council, with Moira MacTaggert becoming a hidden partner. MacTaggert uses her memories of how mutant nations failed in other timelines to not repeat the same mistakes.

Unlike previous mutant nations of Genosha and Utopia, Krakoa invests heavily in developing and exporting medicine to humans. Professor X and Magneto invite White Queen to join the council, along with her fellow Hellfire Club member Black King, to facilitate Krakoa's economic activity. As per deal to join, White Queen also reserves the right to recruit a council member. White Queen requests Kitty Pryde for the position of Red Queen. After accepting the offer, Pryde takes an initially undetermined seat in the council, where she oversees the Marauders' efforts to rescue mutants who cannot freely travel to Krakoa. Apocalypse joins the council after promising to obey Krakoa's laws.

The Quiet Council assembles for the first time after Krakoa's recognition by the United Nations to govern the mutant nation; establish and interpret its laws; and determine its official policies on a broad range of topics. The council establishes the three laws that govern the nation: do not harm humans, respect the sacred land of Krakoa, and make more mutants. Any mutant guilty of breaking these laws is sent to the Pit of Exile and held in stasis deep within Krakoa.

The council also sanctions several groups like S.W.O.R.D.; the intelligence-gathering team X-Force; the mutant investigations team X-Factor; and the Hellions, a team of potentially dangerous and problem-causing mutants overseen by Mister Sinister.

At the end of the storyline "X of Swords", Marvel Girl leaves the council to reform the X-Men, needing to act without the council's politics. Apocalypse leaves Krakoa and the Council to join his family in Amenth. The council votes to approve Magneto's plans to terraform Mars, declaring it the capital of the Solar System. As a result, Destiny takes Apocalypse's seat on the council while Colossus takes Marvel Girl's seat.

After Mystique resurrects Destiny against MacTaggert's wishes, Professor X and Magneto reveal their relationship with MacTaggert to White Queen, who feels betrayed. Mystique subsequently attacked and depowered Moira so she went on the run and started working against Krakoa. MacTaggert's role in Krakoa's founding remains secret, but the rest of the Council learns of her involvement from White Queen.

== Team roster ==
The Quiet Council of Krakoa consisted of four tables named for the four seasons, along with an adjunct section:

- The Autumn table consisted of the most influential mutant leaders, including those who oversaw mutant-human relations.
- The Winter table consisted of the most radical and amoral mutants. Professor X and Magneto believed these mutants could create problems for Krakoa so they put them on the council to keep a close watch.
- The Spring table consisted members of Hellfire Trading Company, which oversaw the official and illicit distribution of Krakoan medicine as well as the imports/exports.
- To balance out the Winter table's influence, the Summer table consisted of the X-Men to represent Krakoa's most fair-minded mutants.
- Adjunct seats consisted of non-voting members on the council, who represented the interests of the island itself.

Character codename	Real Name	Issue joined in	Section of seat	Notes
Professor X	Charles Francis Xavier	House of X #6 (October 2019)	Autumn	Left as the first council dissolved in Immortal X-Men #13 (August 2023).
Magneto	Max Eisenhardt / Erik Magnus Lehnsherr	House of X #6 (October 2019)	Autumn	Left to retire in Immortal X-Men #1 (March 2022).
Apocalypse	En Sabah Nur	House of X #6 (October 2019)	Autumn	Left to be with his family in X of Swords: Destruction #1 (November 2020).
Exodus	Bennet du Paris	House of X #6 (October 2019)	Winter	Left as the first council dissolved in Immortal X-Men #13.
Mister Sinister	Nathaniel Essex	House of X #6 (October 2019)	Winter	Removed in Sins of Sinister: Dominion #1 (April 2023)
Mystique	Raven Darkhölme	House of X #6 (October 2019)	Winter	Left as the first council dissolved in Immortal X-Men #13.
White Queen	Emma Grace Frost	House of X #6 (October 2019)	Spring	Left as the first council dissolved in Immortal X-Men #13.
Black King	Sebastian Hiram Shaw	House of X #6 (October 2019)	Spring	Left as the first council dissolved in Immortal X-Men #13.
Nightcrawler	Kurt Wagner	House of X #6 (October 2019)	Summer	Left as the first council dissolved in Immortal X-Men #13.
Marvel Girl	Jean Elaine Grey	House of X #6 (October 2019)	Summer	Left to reform X-Men in X-Men vol. 5 #15 (November 2020).
Storm	Ororo Munroe	House of X #6 (October 2019)	Summer	Left as the first council dissolved in Immortal X-Men #13.
Cypher	Douglas "Doug" Aaron Ramsey	House of X #6 (October 2019)	Adjunct	Left as the first council dissolved in Immortal X-Men #13.
Krakoa		House of X #6 (October 2019)	Adjunct	Current member of the council.
Red Queen	Katherine "Kate" Anne Pryde	Marauders #1 (November 2019)	Spring	Left as the first council dissolved in Immortal X-Men #13.
Destiny	Irene Adler	Inferno vol. 2 #2 (October 2021)	Autumn	Left as the first council dissolved in Immortal X-Men #13.
Colossus	Piotr "Peter" Nikolaievitch Rasputin	Inferno vol. 2 #2 (October 2021)	Summer	Left as the first council dissolved in Immortal X-Men #13.
Hope Summers		Immortal X-Men #1 (March 2022)	Summer	Represented the Five; left as the first council dissolved in Immortal X-Men #13.
Black Priestess	Selene Gallio	Immortal X-Men #12 (July 2023)	Winter	Left as the first council dissolved in Immortal X-Men #13.
Kafka		X-Men, vol. 6 #35 (June 2024)	Unrevealed	Current member of the council.

== Reception ==
Ratings
- Issue: AIPT
1-2	—N/a
3	10/10
4	9/10
5	8/10
6	9/10
7	8/10
8	8.5/10
9	8/10
10	9.5/10
11	—N/a
12	8.5/10
13	8.5/10
14	9.5/10
15	8/10
16	8/10
17	7.5/10
18	—N/a

According to review aggregation website Comic Book Roundup, Immortal X-Men received an average rating of 8.7 out of 10 based on 133 critics review. Many times, it had also been compared to A Game of Thrones. In 2022, Immortal X-Men won the IGN's Best Comic Book Series or Original Graphic Novel as well as Dragon Awards for Best Comic Book. It was also nominated for the GLAAD Media Award for Outstanding Comic Book at the 34th GLAAD Media Awards.

In 2023, CBR ranked Immortal X-Men 2nd in their "Top 100 Comics of 2022" list. The series won ComicBook.com's Golden Issue for "best ongoing comic book of 2023". Timothy Adams of ComicBook.com stated that "artist Lucas Werneck jumped to another level while illustrating Immortal X-Men. Werneck masterfully balanced emotional beats with hard-hitting action set pieces, with writer Kieron Gillen also creating some of his most impactful work at Marvel. It's not easy following Jonathan Hickman and everything he set up during his time on the X-Men franchise, but Gillen more than held his own and took a lot of Hickman's ideas and both utilized them and added his own special flare to Marvel's merry mutants. [...] Each X-Man's time in the spotlight has felt warranted and earned, which is all you can ask for when dealing with a cast this large".

Following the release of the final issue, Jamie Lovett of ComicBook.com highlighted that "for its final act, Gillen took Immortal X-Men in an eschatological direction, treating the 'Fall of X' like mutantkind's Biblical last days". Lovett commented that it features "the always killer artwork of Juan José Ryp" and it is "a swan song not to be missed".

== Collected editions ==
Title	Material collected	Pages	Publication date	ISBN
Immortal X-Men by Kieron Gillen Volume 1	Immortal X-Men #1-6	184	December 6, 2022	9781302928018
Immortal X-Men by Kieron Gillen Volume 2	Immortal X-Men #7-10	112	May 23, 2023	9781302928025
Immortal X-Men by Kieron Gillen Volume 3	Immortal X-Men #11-13, X-Men: Before the Fall - Sinister Four #1	128	November 28, 2023	9781302951009
Immortal X-Men by Kieron Gillen Volume 4	Immortal X-Men #14-18	136	March 26, 2024	9781302953423
Immortal X-Men Volume 5: X-Men Forever	X-Men: Forever #1-4	120	December 17, 2024	9781302958015
