= Destiny of X =

Marvel Comics storyline

- Publisher: Marvel Comics
- Publication date: March 2022 – July 2023
- Genre: Superhero
- Main character(s): Brotherhood of Arakko; Great Ring of Arakko; Knights of X Legionaries; Marauders; Quiet Council of Krakoa; New Mutants; X-Force; X-Men

Creative team
- Writer: Various
- Artist: Various

Destiny of X is a 2022 relaunch of the X-Men line of comic books published by Marvel Comics. It is the sequel to "Reign of X" following the end of the dual miniseries X Lives of Wolverine and X Deaths of Wolverine. It was the third phase of the Krakoan Age, and the first following the departure of Jonathan Hickman at the end of "Reign of X." "Destiny of X" included the crossover events A.X.E.: Judgment Day and Sins of Sinister. A sequel, "Fall of X," was launched in August 2023.

== Publication history ==
The previous phase Reign of X concluded with X Lives of Wolverine and X Deaths of Wolverine (January – March 2022) which led into Destiny of X.

This phase included the crossover event A.X.E.: Judgment Day (July – November 2022) which focused on humanity's discovery of the mutant resurrection protocols and the subsequent conflict between the Avengers, the X-Men, and the Eternals. This event was written by Kieron Gillen with art by Valerio Schiti. X-Men Red by writer Al Ewing, with art by Stefano Caselli, focuses on the terraformed Mars, which serves as the home to millions of mutants who were freed during the X of Swords crossover. The Marauders series was relaunched with writer Steve Orlando, artist Eleonora Carlini, and colorist Matt Milla as the new creative team. Screen Rant commented that in the first volume the Marauders were "tasked with protecting the interests of the Hellfire Trading Company's black-market and rescuing mutant refugees feeling from unfriendly nations, returning them to safety on Krakoa. Now that most of the world's mutants have been relocated to Krakoa from dangerous territories, and X-Force taking on more responsibility with retrieving stolen Hellfire goods, Pryde is repositioning her Marauders team as a mutant Search and Rescue squad". Additionally, Gilleon began writing the Immortal X-Men series with artist Lucas Werneck which focused on the Quiet Council of Krakoa; this series built plot points for the Sins of Sinister event (January – April 2023), which concluded the phase.

In May 2024, X-Men group editor Jordan D. White commented that the anthology collection "format was shelved" and there would not be compiled trade paperbacks for Destiny of X or Fall of X.

== Titles ==
=== Prelude series ===
Title	Issues	Writer	Artist	Colorist	Debut date	Conclusion date
X Lives of Wolverine	#1–5	Benjamin Percy	Joshua Cassara	Frank Martin	January 19, 2022	March 16, 2022
X Deaths of Wolverine	#1–5	Benjamin Percy	Federico Vicentini	Federico Blee	January 26, 2022	March 23, 2022

=== Ongoing series ===
Title	Issues	Writer(s)	Artist(s)	Colourist(s)	Debut date	Conclusion date
Immortal X-Men	#1–13	Kieron Gillen	Lucas Werneck; Michele Bandini	David Curiel; Dijjo Lima	March 30, 2022	July 12, 2023
Marauders (vol. 2)	#1–12	Steve Orlando	Eleonora Carlini; Andrea Broccardo	Matt Milla	April 6, 2022	March 22, 2023
X-Force (vol. 6)	#27–42	Benjamin Percy	Robert Gill; Christopher Allen; Edgar Salazar	Guru-eFX; Carlos Lopez	April 6, 2022	July 12, 2023
X-Men Red (vol. 2)	#1–13	Al Ewing	Stefano Caselli; Juann Cabal; Andrés Genolet; Michael Sta. Maria; Madibek Musabekov	Federico Blee	April 6, 2022	July 19, 2023
X-Men (vol. 6)	#10–24	Gerry Duggan	Javier Pina; Pepe Larraz; C.F. Villa; Joshua Cassara	Marte Gracia; Matt Milla; Guru-eFX	April 13, 2022	July 5, 2023
Wolverine (vol. 7)	#20–35	Benjamin Percy	Adam Kubert; Federico Vicentini	Frank Martin; Frank D'Armata	April 20, 2022	July 19, 2023
Knights of X	#1–5	Tini Howard	Bob Quinn	Erick Arciniega	April 27, 2022	August 31, 2022
New Mutants (vol. 4)	#25–33	Vita Ayala; Danny Lore; Charlie Jane Anders	Rod Reis; Jan Duursema; Guillermo Sanna; Alberto Alburquerque	Rod Reis; Ruth Redmond; Dan Brown; Carlos Lopez	May 18, 2022	December 28, 2022
Legion of X	#1–10	Si Spurrier	Jan Bazaldua; Rafael Pimentel; Netho Diaz	Federico Blee; Javier Tartaglia	May 25, 2022	February 1, 2023
Deadpool (vol. 9)	#1–10	Alyssa Wong	Martin Coccolo	Neeraj Menon	November 2, 2022	August 23, 2023
Betsy Braddock: Captain Britain	#1–5	Tini Howard	Vasco Georgiev	Erick Arciniega	February 22, 2023	June 21, 2023

=== Limited series ===
Title	Issues	Writer	Artist(s)	Colourist	Debut date	Conclusion date
Sabretooth (vol. 4)	#1–5	Victor LaValle	Leonard Kirk	Rain Beredo	February 2, 2022	July 6, 2022
A.X.E.: Judgment Day	#1–6	Kieron Gillen	Valerio Schiti	Marte Gracia	July 20, 2022	October 19, 2022
X-Terminators	#1–5	Leah Williams	Carlos Gómez	Bryan Valenza	September 21, 2022	January 25, 2023
Sabretooth & the Exiles	#1–5	Victor LaValle	Leonard Kirk	Rain Beredo	November 9, 2022	March 29, 2023
Dark Web: X-Men	#1–3	Gerry Duggan	Rod Reis; Phil Noto		December 14, 2022	January 18, 2023
Bishop: War College	#1–5	J. Holtham	Sean Damien Hill	Espen Grundetjern	February 8, 2023	June 7, 2023
Storm & the Brotherhood of Mutants	#1–3	Al Ewing	Paco Medina; Andrea Di Vito; Alessandro Vitti	Jay David Ramos; Jim Charalampidis; Rain Beredo	February 8, 2023	April 12, 2023
Nightcrawlers	#1–3	Si Spurrier	Paco Medina; Andrea Di Vito; Lorenzo Tammetta; Phillip Sevy	Jay David Ramos; Jim Charalampidis; Rain Beredo	February 15, 2023	April 19, 2023
Immoral X-Men	#1–3	Kieron Gillen	Paco Medina; Andrea Di Vito; Alessandro Vitti	Jay David Ramos; Jim Charalampidis; Rain Beredo	February 22, 2023	April 5, 2023
Rogue & Gambit	#1–5	Stephanie Phillips	Carlos Gómez	David Curiel	March 1, 2023	July 12, 2023
New Mutants Lethal Legion	#1–5	Charlie Jane Anders	Enid Balám	Matt Milla	March 8, 2023	July 19, 2023

=== One-shots ===
Title	Writer	Artist	Colorist	Release date
Marauders Annual #1	Steve Orlando	Creees Lee	Rain Beredo	January 26, 2022
X-Force Annual #1	Nadia Shammas	Rafael Pimentel	Carlos Lopez	April 6, 2022
Giant-Size X-Men: Thunderbird #1	Nyla Rose & Steve Orlando	David Cutler	Irma Kniivila	May 4, 2022
FCBD Avengers/X-Men #1	Kieron Gillen; Gerry Duggan	Dustin Weaver; Matteo Lolli	Marte Garcia; Ian Herring	May 7, 2022
X-Men: Hellfire Gala #1	Gerry Duggan	Matteo Lolli; C.F. Villa; Kris Anka; Russell Dauterman	Frank Martin; Matt Milla; Matthew Wilson; Rain Beredo	July 13, 2022
A.X.E.: X-Men #1	Kieron Gillen	Francesco Mobili	Frank Martin	October 5, 2022
X-Men Annual #1	Steve Foxe	Andrea Di Vito	Sebastian Cheng	December 21, 2022
Sins of Sinister #1	Kieron Gillen	Lucas Werneck	Bryan Valenza	January 25, 2023
Sins of Sinister: Dominion #1	Kieron Gillen	Lucas Werneck	Bryan Valenza	April 26, 2023
X-Men: Before the Fall – Sons of X #1	Si Spurrier	Phil Noto		May 3, 2023
X-Men: Before the Fall – Mutant First Strike #1	Steve Orlando	Valentina Pinti	Frank William	June 7, 2023
X-Men: Before the Fall – Heralds of Apocalypse #1	Al Ewing	Luca Pizzari	Ceci De La Cruz	June 28, 2023
X-Men: Before the Fall – Sinister Four #1	Kieron Gillen	Paco Medina	Edgar Delgado; Protobunker's Fer Sifuentes-Sujo	July 5, 2023

== Related material ==
Title	Issues	Writer	Artist	Colourist	Dates	Notes
Marvel's Voices: Iceman Infinity Comic	#1–4	Luciano Vecchio			June 2022	Infinity Comics exclusive focused on Iceman exploring his Omega-level status.
(Dis)qualifications		Steve Foxe	Alan Robinson	Carlos Lopez	July 11, 2022	A series of online exclusive short stories revealing the outcome of the votes to determine who would join the Krakoan X-Men.
Small Chance		Steve Foxe	Alan Robinson	Carlos Lopez	July 11, 2022	A series of online exclusive short stories revealing the outcome of the votes to determine who would join the Krakoan X-Men.
Get Out the Vote		Steve Foxe	Alan Robinson	Carlos Lopez	July 12, 2022	A series of online exclusive short stories revealing the outcome of the votes to determine who would join the Krakoan X-Men.
Their Loss		Steve Foxe	Alan Robinson	Carlos Lopez	July 12, 2022	A series of online exclusive short stories revealing the outcome of the votes to determine who would join the Krakoan X-Men.
Never Say Never		Steve Foxe	Alan Robinson	Carlos Lopez	July 13, 2022	A series of online exclusive short stories revealing the outcome of the votes to determine who would join the Krakoan X-Men.
Ms. Marvel & Wolverine	#1	Jody Houser	Zé Carlos	Erick Arciniega	August 3, 2022	
X-Men & Moon Girl	#1	Mohale Mashigo	David Cutler	Rachelle Rosenberg	September 7, 2022	
Generations		Steve Foxe	Jim Towe	Erick Arciniega	July 25, 2023	A series of online exclusive short stories about Prodigy, Jubilee, Frenzy, Cannonball, Dazzler, and Juggernaut trying to join the Krakoan X-Men team.
Grounded		Steve Foxe	Jim Towe	Erick Arciniega	July 25, 2023	A series of online exclusive short stories about Prodigy, Jubilee, Frenzy, Cannonball, Dazzler, and Juggernaut trying to join the Krakoan X-Men team.
Flawless		Steve Foxe	Jim Towe	Erick Arciniega	July 26, 2023	A series of online exclusive short stories about Prodigy, Jubilee, Frenzy, Cannonball, Dazzler, and Juggernaut trying to join the Krakoan X-Men team.

== Collected editions ==
The following collected editions were only released in French:

Title	Material Collected	Format	Publication date	ISBN
Destiny of X Volume 1	X-Force Annual #1, X-Men #9, Immortal X-Men #1, X-Men Red #1	Paperback	December 7, 2022	To be confirmed
Destiny of X Volume 2	X-Men #10, Knights of X #1, X-Force #27, Wolverine #20, Marauders #1	Paperback	January 4, 2023	To be confirmed
Destiny of X Volume 3	Legion of X #1, New Mutants #25, Immortal X-Men #2, X-Men Red #2, Marauders #2	Paperback	January 4, 2023	To be confirmed
Destiny of X Volume 4	Giant-Size X-Men: Thunderbird #1, X-Men #11, X-Force #28, Marauders #3, Knights of X #2, Wolverine #21	Paperback	February 8, 2023	To be confirmed
Destiny of X Volume 5	Immortal X-Men #3, Knights of X #3, Legion of X #2, New Mutants #26, Wolverine #22, X-Men Red #3	Paperback	February 8, 2023	To be confirmed
Destiny of X Volume 6	X-Men Red #4, Wolverine #23, X-Force #29, New Mutants #27, Marauders #4, X-Men #12	Paperback	March 8, 2023	To be confirmed
Destiny of X Volume 7	X-Men: Hellfire Gala (2022) #1, Immortal X-Men #4, New Mutants #28, Knights of X #4, Legion of X #3	Paperback	March 8, 2023	To be confirmed
Destiny of X Volume 8	Immortal X-Men #5, X-Men Red #5, Legion of X #4-5, Marauders #5, Knights of X #5	Paperback	April 5, 2023	To be confirmed
Destiny of X Volume 9	X-Men #13, Immortal X-Men #6, Wolverine #24, X-Force #30-31, X-Men Red #6	Paperback	April 5, 2023	To be confirmed
Destiny of X Volume 10	X-Men #14, Marauders #6, Wolverine #25, X-Force #32-33, Legion of X #6	Paperback	May 10, 2023	979-1039115100
Destiny of X Volume 11	Sabretooth #1, Immortal X-Men #7, X-Men Unlimited: X-Men Green #1, New Mutants #29, X-Men Red #7	Paperback	May 10, 2023	979-1039115124
Destiny of X Volume 12	X-Men #15, Immortal X-Men #8, Wolverine #26, Sabretooth #2, X-Men Unlimited: X-Men Green#2	Paperback	June 7, 2023	
Destiny of X Volume 13	Sabretooth #3, X-Men #16, Wolverine #27, New Mutants #30, X-Men Red #8	Paperback	June 7, 2023	
Destiny of X Volume 14	Sabretooth #4, Immortal X-Men #9, X-Force #35, Marauders #7, New Mutants #30	Paperback	July 5, 2023	
Destiny of X Volume 15	Sabretooth #5, X-Men #17, Wolverine #28, Legion of X #8-9, X-Men Red #9	Paperback	July 5, 2023	
Destiny of X Volume 16	X-Terminators #1, Immortal X-Men #10, X-Force #36, Marauders #8, Legion of X #10, X-Men Red #10	Paperback	August 9, 2023	
Destiny of X Volume 17	Sabretooth and the Exiles #1, X-Men Annual(2022), X-Terminators #2, Wolverine #29, New Mutants #31	Paperback	September, 2023	
Destiny of X Volume 18	Sabretooth and the Exiles #2, X-Terminators #3, X-Men #18, X-Force #37, Marauders #9, New Mutants #32	Paperback	September, 2023	
Destiny of X Volume 19	Sabretooth and the Exiles #3, X-Force #38, X-Terminators #4, Wolverine #30, Marauders #10, New Mutants #33	Paperback	October 4, 2023	
Destiny of X Volume 20	X-Men #19, Marauders #11-12, X-Terminators #5, Sabretooth and the Exiles #4, Wolverine #31	Paperback	November 2, 2023	
Destiny of X Volume 21	X-Men #20, Sabretooth and the Exiles #5, Immortal X-Men #11, Wolverine #32, X-Men Red #11, Free Comic Book Day: Uncanny Avengers (2023)	Paperback	November 2, 2023	
Destiny of X Volume 22	X-Men: Before the Fall – Sons of X #1, Betsy Braddock: Captain Britain #1, New Mutants: Lethal Legion #1, X-Men #21, X-Force #39	Paperback	December 6, 2023	
Destiny of X Volume 23	Bishop: War College #1, New Mutants: Lethal Legion #2, Rogue & Gambit #1, X-Force #40, Betsy Braddock: Captain Britain #2-3	Paperback	December 6, 2023	
Destiny of X Volume 24	Wolverine #33, X-Force #41, Bishop: War College #2-3, Rogue & Gambit #2, New Mutants: Lethal Legion #3	Paperback	January 3, 2024	
Destiny of X Volume 25	Immortal X-Men #12, X-Men Red #12, Bishop: War College #4, Rogue & Gambit #3, Betsy Braddock: Captain Britain #4, New Mutants: Lethal Legion #4	Paperback	January 3, 2024	
Destiny of X Volume 26	Wolverine #34, X-Men #22, Bishop: War College #5, Rogue & Gambit #4, New Mutants: Lethal Legion #5, X-Men Before the Fall: Mutant's First Strike #1	Paperback	February 7, 2024	
Destiny of X Volume 27	X-Men Before the Fall: Heralds of Apocalypse #1, X-Men Before the Fall: Sinister Four #1, X-Men #23, X-Force #42, Betsy Braddock: Captain Britain #5	Paperback	February 7, 2024	
Destiny of X Volume 28	Wolverine #35, X-Men #24, Immortal X-Men #13, Rogue & Gambit #5, X-Men Red #13	Paperback	March 5, 2024	
