= X Lives of Wolverine and X Deaths of Wolverine =

Comic book storyline

Publication information
- Publisher: Marvel Comics
- Format: Limited series
- Publication date: January – March 2022
- No. of issues: X Lives: 5 X Deaths: 5
- Main character(s): Wolverine; X-Men; Omega Red

Creative team
- Written by: Benjamin Percy
- Artist(s): X Lives: Joshua Cassara; X Deaths: Federico Vicentini
- Colorist(s): Frank Martin; Federico Blee
- Editor(s): Mark Basso

"X Lives and Deaths of Wolverine" is a comic book storyline during the Krakoan Age which was published by Marvel Comics from January to March 2022. The story takes place between the Reign of X and Destiny of X relaunches and focuses on Wolverine. The storyline also ties into Volume 7 of the main Wolverine title.

== Conception ==
Being divided into two sets of five issues, the story is written by Benjamin Percy, with X Lives artwork provided by Joshua Cassara and X Deaths artwork Federico Vicentini. The color for the miniseries is being separately provided by Frank Martin and Federico Blee.

== Plot ==
The plot marks the beginning of the Second Krakoan Age, with Wolverine traveling in time to save the life of an important figure to the mutant race, the professor Charles Xavier. In the midst of his travels, Wolverine will relive certain moments from his own long-forgotten past as well. At some point, it is revealed that Wolverine was present during the birth of Charles Xavier and indirectly Cassandra Nova, having saved his family from an invading Omega Red, when the Russian mutant possessed some of Xavier family's butlers and nurse. It is revealed that Omega Red's plan is to assassinate Xavier, which would prevent the formation of the X-Men.

== Series ==
Title	Issues	Writer	Artist	Colorist	Debut date	Conclusion date
X Lives of Wolverine	#1–5	Benjamin Percy	Joshua Cassara	Frank Martin	January 19, 2022	March 16, 2022
X Deaths of Wolverine	#1–5	Benjamin Percy	Federico Vicentini	Dijjo Lima	January 26, 2022	March 23, 2022

== Collected edition ==
Title	Material collected	Publication date	ISBN
X Lives Of Wolverine/X Deaths Of Wolverine	X Lives of Wolverine #1-5, X Deaths of Wolverine #1-5	July 2022	978-1302931223
