= Sins of Sinister =

Comic book storyline

Publication information
- Publisher: Marvel Comics
- Genre: Superhero
- Publication date: January – April 2023
- Main character(s): X-Men; Mister Sinister; Chimeras

Creative team
- Written by: Kieron Gillen; Al Ewing; Si Spurrier
- Penciller(s): Lucas Werneck; Paco Medina; Patch Zircher; Alessandro Vitti

"Sins of Sinister" is a 2023 comic book crossover storyline during the Krakoan Age published in the X-Men franchise of books by Marvel Comics. The event involves a dark future brought about by Mister Sinister's corrupt machinations and his experiment in creating a batch of Mutants called Chimeras.

Sins of Sinister kick-offed with a one-shot written by Kieron Gillen and artist Lucas Werneck. Immortal X-Men by Kieron Gillen, X-Men Red by Al Ewing and Legion of X by Si Spurrier were transformed into three limited series: Immoral X-Men, Storm & the Brotherhood of Mutants and Nightcrawlers. The story was told across three different time periods: 10 years, 100 years and 1000 years in the future. The series' writers would then continue their current story plans after the finale one-shot, Sins of Sinister: Dominion.

== Publication history ==
In August 2022, Marvel comics posted a teaser "S.O.S." for the next big X-Men crossover. A later teaser revealed the crossover's official name, Sins of Sinister, and the involvement of Mister Sinister. In the Next Big Thing panel at the New York Comic-Con in October 2022, the X-Men epic is officially announced after months of teases. “Sinister's lurked around, being sinister for all the Krakoan Age. Eventually, he was going to make a play. This is it, and it's bigger than you can imagine, stretching across 1000 years of nightmares,” Gillen explained.

Sinister's machinations will create a horrifying timeline that will extend into several other spin-off limited series, each running for three issues. In Storm & the Brotherhood of Mutants from writer Ewing, Storm leads a new Brotherhood of Arakko across the wrecked landscape of Mars. Nightcrawlers from writer Spurrier features Sinister's private army of chimera assassins. And in Immoral X-Men from writer Gillen, the X-Men are sworn to crush a world that adores and respects them.

During the Professing X: An X-Men Panel in the Thought Bubble comic art festival, the writers talked about the upcoming event and showed off the designs of new characters appearing in the dark future including Wagnerine (a Chimera of Nightcrawler and Wolverine), a new Captain America whose DNA is mixed with those of Mister Sinister, Xible (a future version of Cable merged with Xilo), Rasputin IV from Hickman's Powers of X, Auntie Fortune (a Chimera of Nightcrawler and Domino), and Jon Ironfire.

== Main characters ==
Issues	Characters
Sins of Sinister; Storm and the Brotherhood of Mutants #1-3; Nightcrawlers #1-3; Immoral X-Men #1-3; Sins of Sinister: Dominion	Auntie Fortune; Destiny; Cable; Doctor Stasis; Exodus; Forge; Hope; Ironfire; Khora; Mister Sinister; Mother Righteous; Mystique; Nightcrawler; Orbis Stellaris; Professor X; Storm; Vox Ignis; Wagnerine; Wallcrawler; White Queen; Wiz Kid

== Issues involved ==
=== Prelude issues ===
Title	Issues	Writer	Artist	Colorist	Debut date	Conclusion date
Immortal X-Men	9–10	Kieron Gillen	Lucas Werneck	David Curiel	December 7, 2022	January 18, 2023

=== Main series ===
Title	Issues	Writer	Artist	Colorist	Debut date	Conclusion date
Sins of Sinister	1	Kieron Gillen	Lucas Werneck	Bryan Valenza	January 25, 2023	
Storm & the Brotherhood of Mutants	1–3	Al Ewing	Paco Medina Patch Zircher Alessandro Vitti	TBA	February 8, 2023	April 12, 2023
Nightcrawlers	1–3	Si Spurrier	Paco Medina Patch Zircher Alessandro Vitti	TBA	February 15, 2023	April 19, 2023
Immoral X-Men	1–3	Kieron Gillen	Paco Medina Patch Zircher Alessandro Vitti	TBA	February 22, 2023	April 5, 2023
Sins of Sinister: Dominion	1	Kieron Gillen	Lucas Werneck & Paco Medina	TBA	April 26, 2023	
