= Krakoan Age =

Four-part X-Men publishing initiative from 2019 to 2024

- The Krakoan nation seen in a panel from X-Men #35, the final issue of the Krakoan Age
- Publisher: Marvel Comics
- Publication date: July 2019 – June 2024
- Genre: Superhero
Title(s)
- House of X and Powers of X (July – October 2019)
- Dawn of X (October 2019 – November 2020)
- X of Swords (September – November 2020)
- Reign of X (December 2020 – March 2022)
- Hellfire Gala (June 2021)
- Inferno (September 2021 – January 2022)
- X Lives and Deaths of Wolverine (January – March 2022)
- Destiny of X (March 2022 – July 2023)
- A.X.E.: Judgment Day (July – November 2022)
- Sins of Sinister (January – April 2023)
- Fall of X (August 2023 – June 2024)
- Hellfire Gala (July 2023)
- Fall of the House of X and Rise of the Powers of X (January 2024 – May 2024)
- Main characters: Alpha Flight; Avengers Unity Division; Dark X-Men; Excalibur; Fallen Angels; Hellions; Marauders; Quiet Council of Krakoa; New Mutants; S.W.O.R.D.; X-Corporation; X-Factor; X-Force; X-Men; X-Terminators

Creative team
- Writer: Various
- Artist: Various

The Krakoan Age was a series of X-Men storylines published by Marvel Comics from 2019 to 2024. The Krakoan Age began with the Jonathan Hickman limited series House of X and Powers of X (July – October 2019) and it consists of four major publishing initiatives: Dawn of X (October 2019 – November 2020), Reign of X (December 2020 – March 2022), Destiny of X (March 2022 – July 2023) and Fall of X (August 2023 – June 2024). These phases were interspersed with crossover and event storylines. The Krakoan Age spans "more than 500 issues of X-Men comic books" published "across more than 80 different series". The subsequent publishing initiative, X-Men: From the Ashes, relaunched the X-Men line in a post-Krakoan Age.

The Krakoan Age was defined by the creation of a sovereign mutant nation on the living island of Krakoa and the effective immortality of mutantkind via the newly established resurrection protocols. It featured storylines across multiple timelines. Throughout the phases, mutants faced opposition from the human supremacist organization Orchis who would orchestrate the downfall of Krakoa. The Dominion, god-like entities who exist outside of normal space and time, also threatened the existence of mutants.

Critical reception has been generally positive, with critics praising it as a departure from the usual status quo of many mutant stories. It also received praise for its world-building, story arcs, and its willingness to shed light on lesser-known characters. However, reception became more mixed as the era progressed, with some aspects of later storylines falling short of expectations.

In 2025, the Krakoan Age's Hellfire Gala was loosely adapted to the video game Marvel Rivals as the season of the same name, with Emma Frost voiced by Laura Post and Krakoa being added to the game as a playable map.

== Publication history ==
After Jonathan Hickman completed his run on Avengers and New Avengers with the 2015 crossover "Secret Wars", he stepped away from Marvel Comics for a time to focus on creator-owned projects. His return was announced in March 2019. It was then revealed that he would write two interlocking miniseries called House of X and Powers of X (HOX/POX), with penciling by Pepe Larraz and R. B. Silva respectively. This miniseries also marked a company-wide relaunch of the X-Men. To this end, all ongoing X-Men comics – Uncanny X-Men, Mr. and Mrs. X, X-Force, X-23, and the Age of X-Man miniseries – were cancelled. It was subsequently announced in July 2019 at San Diego Comic-Con that there would be six new X-titles as part of Marvel's Dawn of X campaign; Hickman wrote the flagship title, X-Men (vol 5), during this storyline. Entertainment Weekly highlighted that the Krakoan Age marked a shift in the X-Men mission statement – "the X-Men stopped being superheroes, and became nation-builders". On creating a new society, Hickman stated:

I think one of the interesting things about taking all the mutants and making a culture out of it is that a lot of the pre-culture roles that were defined by external forces have to be revisited when the whole thing gets rejected, or replaced, by new ones. Some people who the world called monsters would reveal themselves not to be, and some who were angels would turn out to eventually do the devil's bidding.

In February 2022, Micheal Foulk of The Beat commented that while Hickman was called "Head of X" that he insisted the "new era of X-Men was not his vision alone. The X-Office introduced a human 'power circuit' where writers, editors, and artists worked collectively on every aspect of the new launch, including the direction and execution of the full X-line. The 'X-slack' where writers and artists discussed story arcs and traded characters for books became a common topic in interviews". Following the X of Swords (September – November 2020) crossover event which concluded Dawn of X campaign, the Reign of X publishing initiative was launched in December 2020. Hickman characterized Dawn of X's theme as "foundation" with Reign of X characterized as "expansion". X-Men Group Editor Jordan D. White stated that "'Dawn of X' was the start of something big for the mutants, they stopped playing the game the way the humans said they had to play. [...] During 'Dawn' there was still a bit of the shock of 'Is this really happening?' and now in 'Reign' the reality of it has set in and the scope of it can be realized. They have big plans and the resources to carry them out". The Reign of X phase saw the line come together for the Hellfire Gala (June 2021) event, as well as Jonathan Hickman's departure from the line with the miniseries Inferno (September 2021 – January 2022). Following Hickman's departure, X-Men continued as the flagship title but was relaunched as new volume written by Gerry Duggan with art by Larraz.

Reign of X concluded with the twin event series X Lives of Wolverine and X Deaths of Wolverine (January – March 2022), written by Benjamin Percy with X Lives artwork by Joshua Cassara and Federico Vicentini; the majority of the line (aside from X-Men, New Mutants, and Sabretooth) was put on pause during this event. This event served as the foundation of the next phase titled "Destiny of X". This phase included the crossover event A.X.E.: Judgment Day (July – November 2022) which focused on humanity's discovery of the mutant resurrection protocols and the subsequent conflict between the Avengers, the X-Men and the Eternals. This event was written by Kieron Gillen with art by Valerio Schiti. X-Men Red by writer Al Ewing, with art by Stefano Caselli, focused on the terraformed Mars now known as Arakko, which became the home of millions of mutants freed during the X of Swords crossover. Additionally, Gillen began writing the Immortal X-Men series with artist Lucas Werneck which focused on the Quiet Council of Krakoa; this series built plot points for the Sins of Sinister (January – April 2023) event which concluded the phase.

Mutantkind's unparalleled growth and prosperity on the island nation Krakoa was then threatened by the human supremacist organization Orchis during the Fall of X phase. At New York Comic-Con 2022, Duggan commented that "the X-Men have been winning for a long time. How long did you think the villains were going to leave them alone". The final phase was kicked off in the third annual Hellfire Gala (July 2023) which drastically altered the status quo of series; this event was written by Duggan, with art by Adam Kubert, Luciano Vecchio, Matteo Lolli, Russell Dauterman, Javier Pina, R.B. Silva, Joshua Cassara, Kris Anka, and Pepe Larraz. This phase then culminated in the dual interconnected miniseries Fall of the House of X and Rise of the Powers of X (January 2024 – May 2024); Duggan wrote Fall of the House of X with art by Werneck. Gillen continued as a main writer on multiple series in this phase such as Rise of the Powers of X with artist R.B. Silva, the ongoing Immortal X-Men conclusion and the limited series X-Men: Forever (March 2024) with artist Luca Maresca. Ewing concluded the ongoing X-Men Red with artist Yildiray Çinar. The Marvel solicitations for May 2024 showed that every X-Men series would conclude with that month billed as "the 'penultimate' month of the Krakoan Age".

Popverse highlighted that the Krakoan Age, from the conclusion of HOX/POX to the last issue X-Men #35 (June 2024), consists of "more than 500 issues" which were released over 56 months "across more than 80 different series. As with Hickman's core ideas for the Krakoa-era relaunch, much of this material remixed existing ideas, tropes, and titles, reusing titles like 'X-Men: Red,' 'Inferno,' and 'Exiles' to new ends, all while advancing the set-up Hickman had created; even when Hickman himself moved on from the franchise midway through the Krakoa era, the line continued as if nothing had changed, thanks to the creative hive mind of writers including Gerry Duggan, Kieron Gillen, Al Ewing, Tini Howard, Si Spurrier, and editor Jordan White". On the change in editorial direction with the next publishing phase, X-Men: From the Ashes, White compared it to Marvel's hard pivot after Grant Morrison's New X-Men run and that ideas from that era "came back around" when "people who loved it started writing comics. And that is where my hope for the future of Krakoa lies – that the people who love it are going to share that love in the future".

== Key fictional elements ==
=== Data pages ===
The data pages in each issue contain in-universe "insider information" on "different organizations, teams and characters". They also "include small hints and teases in code-like formatting on the tops and bottoms of the pages". Data pages are a trademark design choice of Hickman which he brought to the series in House of X and Powers of X; these pages would then appear throughout the Krakoan Age. Tom Mullers worked with Hickman on "creating the design approach, page layouts and defining the typefaces" used in the Krakoan Age. The pages are mostly black and white to keep a clear "contrast against the art pages", however, each data page also includes a single accent color "to focus readers' attention on content that needs highlighting". In October 2020, Mullers commented that "Jonathan is very well known for his design and use of data in his storytelling as well – so the lines blur when it comes to say where my work stopped and his began. Safe to say that all the amazing diagrams and stats you see in the Data pages are of Jonathan’s hand". In a January 2021 interview, Hickman stated that he thought data pages "should reflect the particular book and the particular creator". He highlighted that "everyone's data pages are all put together by the bullpen who are working from templates we’ve created. If someone has a special design, like a map or something like that, then the bullpen will give it a shot. Occasionally, I do some of that".

For decades, no firm definition for the term "Omega-level mutant" was offered by Marvel Comics. The term was widely used when a writer wanted to show the audience that a character was extremely powerful, which led to several conflicting opinions and debates among fans on who qualified as omega-level. In July 2019, Jonathan Hickman provided an official definition with the help of a data page in House of X #1 and listed 14 Omega-level mutants (depicted as assets of the Krakoan Age) alongside their respective power.

Dana Forsythe of SyFy Wire called the inclusion of the data pages "a very Hickman move" and that while "it's been done before (including by Hickman himself in his acclaimed Avengers run)", the "use of non-traditional comics storytelling techniques feel especially intriguing for a Big Two comic". Zachary Jenkins, for ComicsXF, viewed the data pages as a "staple of the Krakoan era" serving as "scene breaks" that "often [recontextual] what readers just saw, or [provide] exposition for what readers are about to see". Alex Schlesinger of Screen Rant highlighted that data pages are used "to convey complex information that couldn't reasonably be put into conversation bubbles on page. These data pages have ranged from Sage's internal analysis of the Krakoan islands operations, to information about the secrets of Moira X's expansive 10 lives, as well as deep dives into the inner workings of one of the X-Men's main enemies, the mutant-hating Orchis". A data page on the Summer House in Hickman's X-Men #1 (vol. 5) drew widespread attention as Jean Grey's bedroom was directly between the bedrooms of Cyclops and Wolverine with internal connecting doors unlike all the other bedrooms in the house. Critics highlighted further subtext that appeared in the Krakoan Age which implied a throuple between these characters. Tom Brevoort, the X-Men group editor in the subsequent X-Men: From the Ashes publishing era, stated in 2024 that the throuple did not occur because it was not explicitly stated during the Krakoan Age.

=== Krakoa ===
Krakoa is a fictional living island with its main body in the Pacific Ocean not far from Australia; other parts of its landmass are located off the coast of Africa in the mid-Atlantic Ocean. The House of X and Powers of X storyline transformed Krakoa into a sovereign nation state for the entire mutant race. Krakoa created additional "Habitat" structures which are self-sustaining environments that are part of its interconnected consciousness. Some of this structures served as embassies around several countries on Earth; Krakoa also expanded to the Blue Area of the Moon, the Green Area on Mars and beyond the solar system, all the while remaining connected to its hive mind via Gateways, which provided ways to instantly travel from one part of Krakoa to another. The gateways can only be accessed by mutants but if a mutant brings a human with them voluntarily, that human must ask for permission from Krakoa to use the gateway.

Various pharmaceuticals could also only be produced from flowers grown on Krakoa such as special pills that extend human life by five years, a "universal" antibiotic and a cure for "disease of the mind, in humans" – these pharmaceuticals were only available to nations that recognized Krakoa's sovereignty. Oliver Sava of The A.V. Club highlighted that "Krakoa's big play for international influence comes via its main exports, miracle drugs for humans"; however, "not every country is interested in these drugs or letting their oppressed mutants escape to Krakoa. Enter: the Marauders, a team of mutant pirates that take these super-drugs into anti-Krakoa countries and pull mutants out". Academic Brett Butler in the Journal of Science Fiction viewed Krakoa as "an integral part of the narrative" commenting that while "Xavier has established the mutant society on Krakoa, the island itself actually controls all of the major aspects of that society". Butler highlighted that "Hickman and other writers show how mutants declare independence through exclusive trade, create laws and punishment, establish mass transit routes, identify a national language, and negotiate property rights—none of which would be possible without the island of Krakoa providing the means and/or permitting them to do so".

==== The Quiet Council ====
The Quiet Council of Krakoa is a fictional council of mutant superheroes and supervillains which governed mutantkind during the Krakoan Age. The twelve-member governing body was divided up into four sections (with three seats each) along with an adjunct section.

==== Mutant resurrection protocols ====
The House of X and Powers of X storyline also introduced the mutant resurrection protocols. A group of mutants known as The Five (Hope Summers, Elixir, Proteus, Egg, and Tempus) working in tandem could resurrect any fallen mutant. Susana Polo of Polygon explained that "the Five prepare a viable egg, imbue it with a fallen mutant's DNA – as collected by Mister Sinister's mutant genetic database – and accelerate the growth of the new mutant body to the age the person was when they died. Then Professor X steps in and uses Cerebro to imbue this mutant husk with a 'backup' mind. Apparently he's been creating a backup copy of every mutant mind on the planet every week". Alex Abad-Santos of Vox commented that the reinterpretation of the mutants in The Five shows that Hickman "is constantly thinking of news ways to think about these dead-end beings. Like he did with Moira, Hickman has turned Goldballs and his crew of forgotten X-Men into full-fledged characters with intriguing powers. He and his cohort, along with other forgotten mutants, have seemingly become more powerful, but not to the point where their existence breaks storytelling. To do what Hickman did with these esoteric characters offers fidelity to the larger X-Men canon".

During the X-Men: Trial of Magneto (August – December 2021) storyline, Scarlet Witch worked with the mutants Polaris, Legion, and Proteus to increase the capabilities of the resurrection protocols. She was able to create a pocket dimension "Waiting Room" which now allows all mutants to be resurrected, including those who never manifested their X-gene and those whose minds were not able to be copied to the computer Cerebro. This added twenty million mutants to the queue, including everyone who died on Genosha. Learning this, the mutants of Krakoa who once referred to Wanda as a "Pretender" have forgiven her for the M-Day incident and Exodus himself has given her the new title of "The Redeemer". The protocols remained a secret from the world until X-Men #12 (June 2022), during the Destiny of X phase, when reporter Ben Urich broke the news of the mutant resurrection in the Daily Bugle. Following the Hellfire Gala (July 2023), The Five were trapped in the White Hot Room, which effectively ended the mutant resurrection protocols on Earth. During the subsequent X-Men: From the Ashes relaunch in 2024, Resurrection Linked Degenerative Sickness (R-LDS) was introduced as a negative consequence resulting from the use of the mutant resurrection protocols. R-LDS was later revealed to not exist, with its apparent link to the protocols being a misdiagnosis given by Beast.

=== Opposition ===
==== Dominion ====
Dominion are the highest fictional forms of "interstellar intelligence within the Marvel Universe" which have "ascended to a plane that is beyond both space and time" – Dominionhood has mostly been achieved by machine-based artificial intelligence. Ascension allows it to exist "in its most advanced state across all points in time simultaneously" with "seemingly divine powers". POX showed both the might and the threat of Dominion in the various timelines Moira MacTaggart lived through. Throughout the Krakoan Age, Mister Sinister (Nathaniel Essex) is obsessed with achieving Dominionhood before machine life. During Immortal X-Men and Sins of Sinister, the knowledge of various Sinister clones "about mutant genes, human augmentation, alien/A.I. potential, and mystical power were all compiled into a master A.I. entity based on Nathaniel Essex himself"; it was later revealed that this entity becomes the Dominion known as Enigma. Enigma emerges as a major threat across multiple timelines while the X-Men are simultaneously at war with Orchis.

==== Orchis ====
Orchis is a fictional organization created by writer Jonathan Hickman and artist Pepe Larraz; the organization first appeared in House of X #1 (July 2019). They are a human supremacist group that has antagonized the X-Men at the time when they settled on Krakoa. Throughout the Krakoan Era, Orchis worked towards ending mutantkind which culminates in a devastating attack during the third Hellfire Gala (July 2023) – this launched the final Krakoan Era phase, Fall of X. Alex Schlesinger of Screen Rant commented that the end of the Fall of X storyline "revealed to the X-Men, Avengers, and the human cohorts within Orchis that the AI faction of Orchis has been working against both humanity and mutantkind all along, attempting to reach ascension through a Dominion. Now, the X-Men, Avengers, and parts of Orchis – like Dr. Alia Gregor and Feilong – are all fighting a multi-front war against the remnants of Orchis. [...] What sets World War Orchis apart is that this war is completely shifting the future of mutantkind, destroying the mutant nation of Krakoa and forcing the mutants of Earth to recalibrate their entire existence".

=== White Hot Room ===
The White Hot Room is a fictional dimension within the M'Kraan Crystal; it "debuted in a Classic X-Men (1986) #8 story by Chris Claremont, John Bolton, and Glynis Oliver, and it was named for the first time in New X-Men (2001) #152 by Grant Morrison, Marc Silvestri, Joe Weems, and Billy Tan. A dying Jean Grey bonded with the Phoenix Force for the first time in the White Hot Room, which serves as a kind of afterlife and astral waiting room for all past and future hosts of the Phoenix".

During the third Hellfire Gala (July 2023), the mutants of Krakoa were forced through Gateways and initially thought to be lost. However, "Hope Summers, Destiny, Exodus, and thousands of other mutants landed in an arid wasteland. They wandered through the desert until they found Mother Righteous, an ambitious clone of Mister Sinister's late wife". Unbeknownst to them, Mother Righteous had transported Atlantic Krakoa into the White Hot Room which allowed the surviving mutants to rebuild. The X-Men trapped in the White Hot Room managed to escape back to Earth and defeat Orchis due to the efforts of Cypher and Rachel Summers. Additionally, Hope Summers sacrificed herself in X-Men: Forever (March 2024 – May 2024) "to rebirth Jean Grey and the Phoenix Force, and while this saved the universe from destruction at the hands of Enigma, it also meant the stranded mutants remained stuck".

It's a bittersweet ending. It's a sad ending because their child moved on beyond them. Krakoa outgrew the X-Men — but they did save it. People wanted it dead and they fought for it and they won. And now, the thing that they made gets to be what it wants to be. And that’s not with them right now. But hopefully, it will return someday.

— X-Men Group Editor Jordan White

X-Men #35 (June 2024), legacy Uncanny X-Men #700, marked the official end of the Krakoan Age with a brief opening to the White Hot Room. Fifteen years had passed for the mutants within and during this time jump, they flourished in "New Krakoa" while continuing the vision of the original mutant nation. During this time, "approximately 15 million" mutants were resurrected, including all of the mutants who died at the Hellfire Gala and all of "the Genosha mutants that were slaughtered back in New X-Men #115 (2001)". After briefly visiting Earth, New Krakoa and the majority of its inhabitants return to the White Hot Room permanently. White commented that Gillen pitched changing "the nature of what Krakoa would be" and then "it took a little while to land on it living in the White Hot Room". Bleeding Cool highlighted that in the post-Krakoan Age, the mutants on Earth will mostly be "the fighting X-Men and other hangers-on".

== Critical reception ==
=== During the Krakoan Age (2019 – 2023) ===
Critics praised the Krakoan Age for shifting the status quo for the X-Men and pushing the publishing line towards new storytelling opportunities. Following the release of House of X and Powers of X, Ryan Sonneville of AIPT commented that while the direction "has not been universally loved", it had reinvigorated his "love for the X-Men [...]. Everything felt fresh, different, and for the first time in many years, the Dawn of X launch felt like it was taking the X-Men into new territory". Sonneville noted that while a sovereign mutant state is not "novel" to Marvel Comics, "Krakoa differed from previous attempts at mutant safe spaces by making clear that this nation would be treated as an equal with other states on the international stage" since they "had the means of demanding this level of acceptance in ways previous mutant homelands could not. This nation of Krakoa has been one of the most intriguing elements of the new X-Men books, and the one I have spent hours pondering over the last few months". Academic Kevin Chiat of the University of Western Australia presented a paper on how the Krakoan Age mutants conquered death. He viewed the resurrection protocols as enhancing the drama since it "has opened new science fictional questions for X-Men to explore such as the meaning of spirituality for an Eternal people, questions of identity and the geo-political implications of an oppressed minority suddenly becoming the most powerful nation on the planet. For the X-Men's Krakoan Age, curing death may have secured mutankind's future but it has also created a whole new set of crises to challenge the superhero genre". Micheal Foulk of The Beat commented on the "life-altering" impact of the resurrection protocols and how it is also a "metatextual commentary on the revolving door of death in superhero comics". Foulk elaborated:

Superheroes, especially of the mutant variety, had been dying and resurrecting for years with often flimsy explanations. Hickman writes resurrection into the narrative as a physical process that requires specific resources and has both rules and limitations. Resurrection for mutants is especially poignant because while many heroes die in the Marvel Universe, it is only the mutants who are actively hunted, terrorized, and murdered just for existing. While many heroes opt into dangerous situations, the mutants have never been allowed to opt-out.

Oliver Sava of The A.V. Club highlighted that "Dawn Of X has impressively expanded on plot points introduced in HOX/POX". In contrast, Lia Williamson of AIPT felt "the series started to stall a lot" after HOX/POX while Chandler Poling of AIPT viewed X of Swords as "the first misstep" of series with next phase feeling "a little sluggish" until the Hellfire Gala which "brought out all the elements that I love about the X-Men in a way that I never knew I needed". Poling also stated that when "reflecting on the Hickman run, what stands out to me most is the introduction to the incredible talent that surrounds this era. The incredible work by Leah Williams, Vita Ayala, Russell Dauterman, Pepe Larraz, Al Ewing, Rod Reis, Phil Noto, Gerry Duggan, and others, certified that I will be sticking around".

On the end of Hickman's run in January 2022, Susana Polo of Polygon commented that Hickman's X-Men era was marked by the "misfortune" of beginning right before the COVID-19 pandemic as comics distribution was disrupted and Marvel Comics paused publication for months. However, the era also had good fortune such as a "thriving 'writers room' of creative talent" who dug "deep into the possibilities of the setting's new status quo" and "blockbuster sales". She highlighted how the Krakoan Age evolved from Hickman's original plan:

It's no secret that the powerhouse of the Krakoan era has been a tightly knit group of writers and artists who built out from the ground rules Hickman established [...] to the point where sticking around for a while to play in that world became appealing. And the writer has also spoken candidly about how the Diamond Comics shutdown and Marvel's pause demanded a change in priorities: Any book that ended meant at least two creators out of a job in a very scarce time. Keeping his collaborators in work took precedence over his initially planned timing.

Polo opined that Hickman's "extreme" changes were "perhaps comparable only to the work of Len Wein, Chris Claremont, and Dave Cockrum in their 1975 push to change the series from an allegorical story about a teen superteam to a sci-fi soap opera. The X-Men have not been the same since 2019, and as with all changes to a classic superhero formula, it was exciting to some and infuriating to others". In April 2022, during the launch of Destiny Of X, Oliver Sava of The A.V. Club viewed the next year of the series as an indication of "Jonathan Hickman's big X-periment" longevity and thought that "the line has the creative power to maintain this status quo for at least a few more years", however, it faced corporate obstacles. Sava also highlighted one the "delightful" aspects of the Krakoan Age was its "fan engagement" since the initial series "got people invested in mutants again" – "Marvel has capitalized on the franchise's passionate fanbase with the annual X-Men election and Hellfire Gala".

In May 2023, George Marston of Newsarama highlighted that "the Krakoa era instantly moved the metaphor of mutantkind as a self-identified reflection of the experiences of marginalized people in a new direction. Rather than being hated and feared by humans, mutants now had to face the perils of not evolving fast enough, not being advanced enough, not taking big enough swings toward the future". However, after Hickman left the series, Marston thought the story was shifting back towards the traditional conflict with humanity and he hoped that the Fall of X would not lead to the return of the X-Mansion status quo. Marston wrote that while the Krakoan Age was "flawed", it "at least grappled with taking that story a step further. By moving on from the classic 'hated and feared by the humans they protect' theme and redirecting away from humanity as mutantkind's greatest enemy toward the evil future AI Nimrod and the Phalanx, a new fantasy took root in the franchise – one where those who feel the most endangered will outlive their tormentors to face radical and mystifying new horizons under their own agency".

David Harth, for CBR in August 2023, commented that while X-Men (Vol. 6) "sold well", the series felt "less important than when Hickman was writing" the previous volume. He viewed Pepe Larraz as "Marvel's heaviest-hitting penciler" but Gerry Duggan as a "steady hand" instead of a "superstar". Harth opined that the addition of Immortal X-Men by Kieron Gillen and X-Men Red by Al Ewing led to X-Men falling "further in readers' esteem" as "many fans" assumed the new titles "were the important books" because they had the more "A-list writers" even though all three titles had comparable art teams – "Immortal and Red gave readers more of the high-concept plots they were expecting and those books soon became the ones that most people thought of as flagships. X-Men (Vol. 6) was a fun superhero book, but it wasn't the center of the Krakoa Era anymore". However, Harth thought Dungan had the tools to "shine" in the upcoming Fall Of X as a superhero story was what was needed which "should let X-Men (Vol. 6) retake its spot at the top".

=== End of an era (2024) ===
Following the conclusion of the Rise of the Powers of X miniseries, Jesse Schedee of IGN highlighted the "immense" cost of defeating both Orchis and Enigma – "the mutant nation is effectively gone, and the vast majority of the world's mutants are still trapped inside the White Hot Room. Earth's mutant population has dwindled once more, and humanity hates and fears them as much as ever". Schedee commented that "on the bright side, while the era of Krakoa has ended, this isn't entirely a return to the usual status quo for the X-Men". Following the conclusion of X-Men #35, Rich Johnston of Bleeding Cool stated that he and many fans would have trouble letting the Krakoan Age go but "with the time jump, Marvel Comics has placed it in a sealed coffin. There is no going back". Johnston commented that Marvel Comics understands how fans cling "to a previous state of storytelling when the comic book moves on". In this case, an in-canon explanation is given for moving the story forwards in the last issue of era – the old Krakoa was heading towards burnout because it was on an unsustainable path even without the interference of Orchis. Whereas, the new Krakoa within the White Hot Room had avoided burnout with "sustainable, low impact growth" with the New Krakoan mutants preferring it to Earth. Alex Schlesinger of Screen Rant highlighted that labelling the mutant society within the White Hot Room as New Krakoa "gives hope to anyone depressed over the transformative era's conclusion with just two simple words". Schlesinger commented that the era ending "is tragic for fans of the transformative reinvention of the X-Men franchise, but the words 'New Krakoa' bring light to a dark period. Even though the Krakoan Age has ended, Krakoa will never be truly destroyed".

Austin Gorton of ComicsXF focused on the art of Krakoa from X-Men (vol. 6) #35 – "there's just something about the final image of Krakoa saying goodbye to the mutants staying behind on Earth to be churned up into the latest relaunch that I find achingly beautiful. There are few words on the page, yet it seems to say so much. It haunts me (in a good way)". Isaac Jansons, also for Screen Rant, highlighted the "metatexual level" of building stories around conflict and that Marvel can never truly let the X-Men win because they "will never stop publishing X-Men stories". Jansons stated that "what the Krakoan Era posits, however, is that said bigotry shouldn't mean that the X-Men can never be happy. That something beautiful, and fragile, and necessarily messy like Krakoa can, and should, be built in opposition to hate, if only for a day". Brandon Zachary of CBR commented that the X-Men for years were splintered and "sidelined in the Marvel Universe" until the Krakoa Age. Zachary highlighted that the formation of a new mutant nation "introduced an openly political subtext into a franchise that has always been rooted in heavy thematic exploration of redemption, hatred, and acceptance" and that the scale of the new direction "gave creators plenty of room to experiment, resulting in an X-Men line that defied expectations and felt wholly unique". He opined that:

The Krakoa Era proves that the X-Men can work in all sorts of styles and genres, all while retaining a core thematic throughline that elevates this series above the rest of the genre. [...] As it approaches its end – and, notably, the era is coming to a close on its own terms – it's worth noting just how successful Krakoa has been in reminding readers of the sheer potential afforded by this corner of the Marvel Universe – and celebrating it for also being a phenomenal piece of comics creation and storytelling across the board".

In contrast, Graeme McMillan of PopVerse thought that the "bold new direction" of the Krakoan Age "might have been a little too bold, in retrospect". McMillan viewed it as an "uneven" era with an "increasingly messy" second half although he preferred that the Krakoan Age was ambitious with "enough fun touches to enjoy even when the overarching stories fall flat". McMillan highlighted the amount of work that has to be undone to return the line to the basics and the "final year, in which the many dangling plot threads are tied up, feels especially rushed and, at times, anti-climactic – but that might be because it was struggling with an arguably impossible task. [...] The problem, ultimately, might lie at the feet of Jonathan Hickman and the original set up for the Krakoa era. There are a lot of big swings in both House of X and Powers of X that, arguably, were too big for the X-Men to continue to exist in the shared Marvel Universe". Jude Jones of ComicsXF stated that "Krakoa's appeal was less in what it achieved – the main characters and writers were still largely white (though not at all straight [...]), but the themes around culture and assimilation and assertion – these were analogous to the way in which I perceived and interacted with my culture. Krakoa as a concept was messy and incomplete (and, it should be noted, largely conceived and directed by a heterosexual white man); and yet, despite all of that, maybe even because of some of that, it felt genuine and honest in a way so many other comics hadn't". Jones viewed the "grandiose ideas" as "enticing" but was disappointed by how they were "executed inconsistently" – "what bothered me, especially toward the end, was the lack of originality with which things ended. Big robots and bigots upended by a scrappy, small group of mutants. To begin an era with a paradigm shift, only to end it with a regression to the norm – this, this low aim was sinful". Joe George, for Den of Geek, also highlighted the shortcomings of the Krakoan Age; it had the typical franchise problems such as "messy continuity", too many spin-off books and "needless crossovers". George commented that "Krakoa began with so much more promise" but thought the "primary problem" was that "it never fully embraced or explored its big ideas". George opined that "the Krakoa era offered a brief chance for the franchise to grow in compelling ways, but it fell short, refusing to fully embrace the conceit of mutation and change itself".

Mahmoud Salem of News Line Magazine highlighted that to return the X-Men to the status quo "the Marvel writers' solution to the 'Krakoa mutants problem' seems to be the annihilation of their state and their planetary deportation, with them returning to live in a world that continues to construct a culture of hatred against them". He also reported that, throughout the Krakoan Age, readers have been divided as to whether the storyline is intended as an extended allegory for the state of Israel. Salem opined that "the parable of Krakoa is really a Greek tragedy, one that mirrors the promise of Israel when it was first founded (as a leftist egalitarian nation that even the Egyptian Communist Party supported publically [sic] at its inception) and what it has become over time". Asher Elbein of Defector viewed the Krakoan Age as "an impressively precision-engineered setup, something that can be plausibly read in multiple ways" where "you can, if you like, interpret it as a metaphor for the promises and failures of Zionism, or ethnonationalism more generally". Elbein commented that "as time goes on, the beautiful Krakoan dream is brutally undercut by the agendas of the monsters they allow in [...]. You can also read Krakoa just as easily as an invocation of the original Zionist nightmare: a small nation surrounded on all sides by enemies bent on its elimination, who poison its reputation and are ultimately successful in destroying it via brutal sneak attack".

== Awards and nominations ==
Year	Award	Category	Creator(s)	Work(s)	Result	Ref.
Note: When a creator is nominated for multiple works, works in **bold** are part of the Krakoan Age.
2021	Eisner Awards	Best Writer	Jonathan Hickman	Decorum (Image); **Giant-Size X-Men**, **X-Men** (Marvel)	Nominated	
2021	Eisner Awards	Best Writer	Chip Zdarsky	Stillwater (Image/Skybound); Daredevil, **Fantastic Four/X-Men** (Marvel)	Nominated	
2021	Eisner Awards	Best Coloring	Marte Gracia	Empyre, **X of Swords** (Marvel)	Nominated	
2021	Eisner Awards	Best Lettering	Clayton Cowles	Aquaman, Batman, Batman and the Outsiders, Strange Adventures, Superman: Man of Tomorrow, Superman's Pal Jimmy Olsen (DC); Adventureman, Bitter Root, Bog Bodies, Die (Image); Reaver (Image/Skybound); Morbius, **X Of Swords** (Marvel)	Nominated	
2022	Eisner Awards	Best Coloring	Matt Wilson	Undiscovered Country (Image); Fire Power (Image/Skybound); Eternals, Thor, **Wolverine** (Marvel); Jonna and the Unpossible Monsters (Oni)	Won	
2022	Eisner Awards	Best Lettering	Clayton Cowles	The Amazons, Batman, Batman/Catwoman, Strange Adventures, Wonder Woman Historia (DC); Adventureman (Image); Daredevil, Eternals, King in Black, Strange Academy, Venom, **X-Men Hickman**, **X-Men Duggan** (Marvel)	Nominated	
2022	Dragon Awards	Best Comic Book	Kieron Gillen, Mark Brooks	Immortal X-Men	Won	
2022	GLAAD Media Awards	Outstanding Comic Book	Leah Williams	X-Factor	Nominated	
2022	Golden Issue Awards (ComicBook.com)	Best Ongoing Comic Series	Al Ewing, Stefano Caselli	X-Men Red	Nominated	
2022	Golden Issue Awards (ComicBook.com)	Best Limited Comic Series	Kieron Gillen, Valerio Schiti	A.X.E.: Judgment Day	Nominated	
2022	Golden Issue Awards (ComicBook.com)	Best Writer	Vita Ayala	New Mutants	Nominated	
2022	Golden Issue Awards (ComicBook.com)	Best Writer	Al Ewing	X-Men Red	Nominated	
2022	Golden Issue Awards (ComicBook.com)	Best Writer	Simon Spurrier	Legion of X	Nominated	
2022	Golden Issue Awards (ComicBook.com)	Best Colorist	Marte Gracia	A.X.E.: Judgment Day	Won	
2022	IGN Awards	Best Comic Book Series or Original Graphic Novel	Kieron Gillen, Lucas Werneck, Michele Bandini	Immortal X-Men	Won	
2023	GLAAD Media Awards	Outstanding Comic Book	Kieron Gillen, Lucas Werneck, Michele Bandini, David Curiel, Dijjo Lima, Clayton Cowles	Immortal X-Men	Nominated	
2023	GLAAD Media Awards	Outstanding Comic Book	Vita Ayala, Danny Lore, Charlie Jane Anders, Danilo Beyruth, Rod Reis, Jan Duursema, Guillermo Sanna, Alex Lins, Alberto Alburquerque, Ro Stein, Ted Brandt, Dan Brown, Ruth Redmond, Carlos Lopez, Tamra Bonvillain, Travis Lanham	New Mutants	Nominated	
2023	Golden Issue Awards	Best Ongoing Comic Series	Kieron Gillen, Lucas Werneck	Immortal X-Men	Won	
2023	IGN Awards	Best Comic Book Series or Original Graphic Novel	Gerry Duggan	X-Men (vol. 6)	Nominated	
2024	GLAAD Media Awards	Outstanding Comic Book	Tini Howard	Betsy Braddock: Captain Britain	Nominated	
2024	GLAAD Media Awards	Outstanding Comic Book	Charlie Jane Anders	New Mutants: Lethal Legion	Nominated	

== List of titles ==
=== Flagship titles ===
Team	Details	Ref
X-Men, vol. 5	The flagship title launched during Dawn of X featuring world-building stories of the mutant renaissance.	
X-Men, vol. 6	The flagship title launched during Reign of X featuring a new team of chosen champions of mutantkind.	
Immortal X-Men	One of the flagship titles launched during Destiny of X focusing on the politics within the Quiet Council of Krakoa. The title is replaced by Immoral X-Men during the Sins of Sinister event. The storyline is concluded in the limited series X-Men Forever.	
X-Men Red, vol. 2	One of the flagship titles launched during Destiny of X featuring the Planet Arakko under the guidance of the conflicting factions of Storm's Brotherhood and Brand's X-Men Red, and later with Genesis' Great Ring. The title is replaced by Storm & the Brotherhood of Mutants during the Sins of Sinister event. The storyline is concluded in the limited series Resurrection of Magneto.	

=== Other titles ===
Team	Details	Ref
Dawn of X
Marauders, vol. 1	Captain Kate Pryde led a pirate team traveling the world for the supply and trade of the Krakoan drugs and smuggling of mutants into and out of nations hostile to Krakoa.	
Excalibur, vol. 4	Betsy Braddock (as Captain Britain) and her team explore the connection between mutant powers and magic in the Otherworld. The storyline is continued in the series Knights of X.	
New Mutants, vol. 4	Magik led a spacefaring team of classic New Mutants and Generation X members, and later acts as mentor to younger mutants in Krakoa; a second team of outreach party seek young mutants who have chosen not to come to Krakoa. The resident New Mutants' adventure continued in New Mutants: Lethal Legion.	
Fallen Angels, vol. 2	Kwannon (as Psylocke) recruits Cable and X-23 for a personal mission which could jeopardize all of mutantkind.	
X-Force, vol. 6	The mutant black-ops team dealing with the security of Krakoa.	
Hellions	A team of mutant troublemakers given an outlet for their gene-given desires.	
X-Factor, vol. 4	A team investigating and enforcing the Resurrection Protocols. The storyline in continued in the series X-Men: Trial of Magneto.	
Reign of X
S.W.O.R.D., vol. 2	The mutant nation's forefront representatives to the outer universe.	
Children of the Atom	A group of young vigilantes operating in New York City posing as mutants.	
Way of X	Nightcrawler assembled a team focused on the path of answers for mutantkind's spirituality. The title is concluded in the one-shot X-Men: The Onslaught Revelation.	
X-Corp	A corporate team headed by CXOs Warren and Monet staffed with some of the brightest and most deviant minds in mutantkind.	
Destiny of X
Marauders, vol. 2	Captain Pryde leads a new crew for rescuing mutants.	
Knights of X	Captain Britain leads a team of ten knights into Otherworld in a quest to search the Siege Perilous. The title concluded in the series Betsy Braddock: Captain Britain.	
Legion of X	The mutant police force formed by Nightcrawler and Legion. During the Sins of Sinister event, the title is replaced by Nightcrawlers featuring Sinister's private army of chimera assassins.	
X-Terminators, vol. 2	A limited series featuring Wolverine, Dazzler, Jubilee, and Boom-Boom battling armies of vampires.	
Sabretooth & the Exiles	The mutants exiled in The Pit are in pursuit of an escaped Sabretooth. The title is a continuation of the Sabretooth solo series and is concluded in the Sabretooth War arc of the Wolverine series.	
Bishop: War College	Bishop training young mutants as War Captains in training for Krakoa.	
Fall of X
Uncanny Avengers, vol. 4	A new lineup of the Unity Squad formed to foster the unity between humanity and the mutant nation of Krakoa.	
Dark X-Men, vol. 2	Madelyne Pryor formed a team based out of Limbo to fill the void left by the X-Men.	
Realm of X	A team of mutantkind's fiercest warriors sent on a mystical mission in Vanaheim to fight the White Witch.	
Alpha Flight, vol. 5	Two Alpha Flight squads, split between human and mutant members, are secretly working together to transport mutants to Chandilar.	
Dead X-Men	The fallen heroes murdered in the Hellfire Gala are guided by Askani on a sacred mutant mission to find for an intact biological Moira mind in one of Sinister's close-engine timelines.	

== In other media ==
In April 2025, the Krakoan Age's Hellfire Gala was loosely adapted to the video game Marvel Rivals as the season of the same name, with Emma Frost voiced by Laura Post, and Krakoa being added to the game as a playable map.
