= Exodus (character) =

- Exodus drawn by John Romita, Jr.

Publication information
- Publisher: Marvel Comics
- First appearance: X-Factor #92 (July 1993)
- Created by: Scott Lobdell; Joe Quesada

In-story information
- Alter ego: Bennet du Paris
- Species: Human mutant
- Team affiliations: Marauders; Acolytes; The 198; Crusaders; Brotherhood of Mutants; Quiet Council of Krakoa
- Notable aliases: Paris Bennet
- Abilities: Telekinesis; Telepathy; Teleportation; Immortality; Accelerated healing factor

Exodus is a supervillain appearing in American comic books published by Marvel Comics. Created by writer Scott Lobdell and artist Joe Quesada, he first appeared in X-Factor #92 (July 1993). His real name was initially given as Paris Bennett, but this was uncovered as an alias when he was revealed to have been born in 12th-century France under the name of Bennet Du Paris.

== Fictional character biography ==
Born in the 12th century, Bennet du Paris is a crusader and best friends with Eobar Garrington, the Black Knight. The two set out to find the Tower of Power, the domain of the mythic "Eternal Pharaoh" in Aqaba. When Dane Whitman (the 20th-century Black Knight) and Sersi are transported to the 12th century, Whitman possesses Garrington's body. Eobar retains control, but feels that something is wrong. He abandons his quest, angering du Paris, who leaves to find the tower alone. After traveling through the desert for hours, du Paris collapses. A voice speaks to him, asking him if he was willing to risk everything to become one of the strong. Du Paris manifests his mutant abilities and disappears.

Apocalypse captures du Paris and transforms him into Exodus. Black Knight and Sersi, who have also been captured, recognize Exodus due to having encountered him in the 20th century. Apocalypse commands Exodus to destroy the Black Knight, but he refuses. As punishment, Apocalypse seals Exodus in a crypt in the Swiss Alps.

In the 20th century, Magneto frees Exodus and recruits him into his Acolytes. When Charles Xavier wipes Magneto's mind, Exodus assumes leadership of the Acolytes. Soon after, Fabian Cortez kidnaps Magneto's granddaughter Luna amidst an ongoing conflict between humans and mutants in Genosha. Exodus arrives in Genosha and confronts the Avengers and X-Men, but is wounded by Black Knight and forced to retreat.

Exodus forms a new version of the Brotherhood of Mutants consisting of Avalanche, Nocturne, Sabretooth, Mammomax, and Black Tom Cassidy. Exodus leads an attack on a group of humans, but is thwarted by the X-Men.

Exodus is among the 198 mutants who retain their powers following M-Day, when the Scarlet Witch removes the powers of most mutants on Earth. He leads a new team of Acolytes with Frenzy, Random, and Tempo as followers. After learning that no mutants have been born post-Decimation and that mutants are now an endangered species, he leaves. In Antarctica, Exodus meets Mister Sinister, who reveals that he has a plan to save mutants from extinction.

Exodus assists in healing Professor X after he is shot in the head by Bishop. Despite being in a weakened state, Xavier is resisting Exodus' efforts, which requires rebuilding Xavier's damaged brain atom by atom and temporarily removing his memories. Exodus succeeds, but Xavier's mind refuses to have his memories returned. Exodus and Emma Frost confront Xavier in the astral plane and force him to stand down. After the battle, Xavier convinces Exodus to disband the Acolytes and find a new way to help mutantkind. Exodus renounces the name Magneto gave him and decides to embark on a personal pilgrimage.

Following the events of "House of X", Exodus becomes a citizen of Krakoa and member of its ruling council, the Quiet Council of Krakoa. Alongside Mister Sinister, Mystique, and Selene, Exodus is a member of the Council's Winter table, which consists of radical mutants. When Krakoa relocates to the White Hot Room, Exodus remains on Earth rather than accompany Krakoa.

== Powers and abilities ==
Exodus is an Omega-level mutant who possesses a vast array of psionic abilities including telekinesis, telepathy, and teleportation, as well as superhuman durability and healing.

Exodus is able to use his telekinetic abilities to lift heavy objects, generate highly durable force fields around him, project damaging blasts, and disassemble and reassemble complex technological devices. His telekinesis has sufficient fine control that he could perfectly reform Charles Xavier after Xavier's brain and skull were obliterated.

== Other versions ==
An alternate universe version of Exodus appears in Age of Apocalypse as a member of Magneto's X-Men.

== In other media ==
=== Television ===
Exodus appears in X-Men '97, voiced by Bo Poraj.

=== Video games ===
- Exodus appears as a boss in X-Men: Mutant Apocalypse.
- Exodus appears as a boss in X-Men 2: Clone Wars.
- Exodus appears as a boss in X-Men: Gamesmaster's Legacy.
- Exodus makes a non-speaking appearance in X-Men: Children of the Atom.
- Exodus makes a non-speaking appearance in Magneto's ending in Marvel vs. Capcom 3: Fate of Two Worlds.

=== Novels ===
Exodus appears in the Mutant Empire novel trilogy, written by Christopher Golden.

=== Merchandise ===
- An action figure of Exodus was produced by Toy Biz as part of the merged X-Men/X-Force line.
- Exodus received a mini-figure from HeroClix.
- In the card game Marvel Champions, Exodus appears as a Villain modular set in the Gambit hero pack and a Nemesis set in the Magneto hero pack.
