= X-Men: Shadows of Tomorrow =

Comics event

- Publisher: Marvel Comics
- Publication date: January 2026
- Genre: Superhero
- Main character: See below

Creative team
- Writer: Various
- Artist: Various
- Colorist: Various

X-Men: Shadows of Tomorrow is a 2026 relaunch of the X-Men line of comic books published by Marvel Comics that follows X-Men: From the Ashes and the Age of Revelation storyline.

== Publication history ==
The Shadows of Tomorrow relaunch was first revealed on September 19, 2025. The announcement confirmed the continuation of X-Men (vol. 7), Uncanny X-Men (vol. 6), and Wolverine (vol. 8) from From the Ashes in January 2026, and the launch of Cyclops and Wade Wilson: Deadpool in February 2026.

The Shadows of Tomorrow era was officially announced by Marvel Comics' Editor-in-Chief C. B. Cebulski and VP, Executive Editor Tom Brevoort at the "Marvel Comics: X-Men Panel" at New York Comic Con on October 10, 2025. The announcement confirmed that Jed MacKay, Gail Simone, and Saladin Ahmed would continue writing X-Men (vol. 7), Uncanny X-Men (vol. 6), and Wolverine (vol. 8), respectively. It also revealed that Cyclops would be a five-issue limited series written by Alex Paknadel with art by Rogê Antônio, while Wade Wilson: Deadpool would launch as an ongoing series written by Benjamin Percy and illustrated by Geoff Shaw. Other ongoing titles announced at the panel included Inglorious X-Force (written by Tim Seeley and illustrated by Michael Sta. Maria), Storm: Earth's Mightiest Mutant (written by Murewa Ayodele and illustrated by Federica Mancin), and Generation X-23 (written by Jody Houser and illustrated by Jacopo Camagni). Other limited series announced at the panel included Rogue (five issues; written by Erica Schultz and illustrated by Luigi Zagaria) and Magik and Colossus (five issues; written by Ashley Allen and illustrated by Germán Peralta).

== Titles ==
=== Ongoing series ===
Title	Issues	Writer	Artist	Colorist	Debut date	Conclusion date
X-Men (vol. 7)	#23–	Jed MacKay	Tony S. Daniel	Fernando Sifuentes-Sujo	January 7, 2026	TBA
Wolverine (vol. 8)	#14–	Saladin Ahmed	Martín Cóccolo	Jesus Aburtov	January 7, 2026	TBA
Uncanny X-Men (vol. 6)	#22–	Gail Simone	David Marquez	Matt Wilson	January 14, 2026	TBA
Inglorious X-Force	#1–10	Tim Seeley	Michael Sta. Maria	Romulo Fajardo Jr.	January 21, 2026	October 21, 2026
Wade Wilson: Deadpool	#1–	Benjamin Percy	Geoff Shaw	Alex Sinclair	February 11, 2026	TBA
Generation: X-23	#1–10	Jody Houser	Jacopo Camagni	Erick Arciniega	February 18, 2026	November 11, 2026
X-Men United	#1–	Eve L. Ewing	Tiago Palma	Brian Reber	March 11, 2026	TBA
X-Orcists	#1–	Ashley Allen	Germán Peralta	TBA	November 18, 2026	TBA
Maximum X-Men	#1–	Christopher Yost	Tony S. Daniel	TBA	December 2, 2026	TBA

=== Limited series ===
Title	Issues	Writer	Artist	Colorist	Debut date	Conclusion date
Rogue	#1–5	Erica Schultz	Luigi Zagaria	Espen Grundetjern	January 21, 2026	May 20, 2026
Magik and Colossus	#1–5	Ashley Allen	Germán Peralta	Arthur Hesli	February 4, 2026	June 17, 2026
Storm: Earth's Mightiest Mutant	#1–5	Murewa Ayodele	Federica Mancin	Javier Tartaglia	February 4, 2026	June 3, 2026
Cyclops	#1–5	Alex Paknadel	Rogê Antônio	Fernando Sifuentes-Sujo	February 11, 2026	June 3, 2026
Moonstar	#1–5	Ashley Allen	Edoardo Audino	Arthur Hesli	March 4, 2026	July 22, 2026
Bishop	#1–5	Saladin Ahmed	Mario Santoro	Federico Blee	June 10, 2026	October 28, 2026
Tomb of Apocalypse	#1–5	Ashley Allen	Domenico Carbone	Fernando Sifuentes-Sujo	August 26, 2026	TBA
DNX	#1–5	Jed MacKay	Federico Vicentini	David Curiel	September 16, 2026	November 18, 2026
Jean Grey	#1–5	Jed MacKay	Rogê Antônio	TBA	November 25, 2026	TBA
Fugitive X-Force	#1–5	Tim Seeley	Áthila Fabbio	TBA	December 9, 2026	TBA

=== One-shots ===
Title	Writer(s)	Artist(s)	Colorist	Release date	Ref
X-Men Annual #1	Ryan Stegman	Ryan Stegman; Steve Skroce; Sanford Greene	Arthur Hesli	March 4, 2026	
Uncanny X-Men Annual #1	Gail Simone; Mikki Kendall	Francesco Mortarino	Mattia Iacono	April 8, 2026	
X-Men: The Hellfire Murder #1	Saladin Ahmed; Jed MacKay; Gail Simone; Eve L. Ewing; Erica Schultz	Tony Daniel; Luciano Vecchio; Federica Mancin	Fernando Sifuentes-Sujo	July 22, 2026	

== Events and crossovers ==
Part	Issue	Release date
DNX
Prologue	Comics Giveaway Day 2026: Armageddon/X-Men #1	May 2, 2026
Prologue	X-Men (vol. 7) #35	August 12, 2026
Prologue	X-Men (vol. 7) #36	August 26, 2026
1	DNX #1	September 16, 2026
2	X-Men (vol. 7) #37	September 16, 2026
3	DNX #2	September 30, 2026
4	X-Men (vol. 7) #38	September 30, 2026
5	Fantastic Four (vol. 8) #17	September 30, 2026
6	DNX #3	October 14, 2026
7	X-Men (vol. 7) #39	October 14, 2026
8	X-Men (vol. 7) #40	October 28, 2026
9	Fantastic Four (vol. 8) #18	October 28, 2026
10	DNX #4	November 4, 2026
11	X-Men (vol. 7) #41	November 11, 2026
12	DNX #5	November 18, 2026
