= Amazing X-Men =

Comic book series

- Cover art for Amazing X-Men #1. Art by Ed McGuinness.

Publication information
- Publisher: Marvel Comics
- Format: (vol. 1); Limited series (vol. 2); Ongoing series
- Genre: Superhero
- Publication date: (vol. 1); 1995 (vol. 2); 2013-2015
- No. of issues: (vol. 1); 4 (vol. 2); 19
- Main character(s): Beast; Colossus; Firestar; Iceman; Nightcrawler; Northstar; Storm; Wolverine

Creative team
- Written by: (vol. 2); Jason Aaron (issues 1–6); Kathryn Immonen (issue 7); Christopher Yost & Craig Kyle (issues 8-19)
- Artist(s): (vol. 2); Ed McGuinness (issues 1–)

Amazing X-Men is the name of three X-Men comic book series from Marvel Comics. The first was a limited series published during the Age of Apocalypse storyline. The subsequent ongoing series began in November 2013 in the aftermath of "Battle of the Atom" and was initially written by Jason Aaron with art by Ed McGuinness, featuring a lineup of long-time X-Men characters led by Wolverine. The first story arc features the return of Nightcrawler, who was killed in the 2010 story arc X-Men: Second Coming. The second series ended in 2015, with issue 19 being the last issue. The third series debuted in October 2025 as part of the "Age of Revelation" event.

== Publication history ==
=== Limited series (1995) ===
The original Amazing X-Men was a four-issue limited series that replaced X-Men during the 1995 alternate universe storyline Age of Apocalypse, in which all X-titles were given new names and issue numbers. The Amazing X-Men consisted of team leader Quicksilver and Storm, Dazzler, Banshee, Iceman, and Exodus. The team is sent to Maine by Magneto to aid in the evacuation of humanity to Europe. During this mission, the team fights Apocalypse's Brotherhood of Chaos, as well as the Horseman Abyss, who is defeated by Banshee. During their absence from the Xavier Mansion, Magneto and Bishop are attacked by Apocalypse himself, who captures them both. Fulfilling their mission, Quicksilver splits up his team to help the other X-Men: sending Iceman to rendezvous with Rogue's team (the Astonishing X-Men) and Dazzler and Exodus to find Magneto's son, Charles. Quicksilver, Storm, and Banshee go to rescue Bishop, who is in the hands of the Madri, Apocalypse's priests.

=== Ongoing series (2013–2015) ===
Starting in 2013, Marvel began using the title Amazing X-Men for an ongoing X-Men series written by Jason Aaron and illustrated by Ed McGuinness. The first arc of the book is a continuation of a storyline in Wolverine and the X-Men and sees a team of X-Men searching for deceased member Nightcrawler in the afterlife. With All-New X-Men featuring time-displaced original X-Men, Uncanny X-Men featuring Cyclops's renegade X-Men team, Wolverine and the X-Men featuring the Jean Grey School's staff and students in the school setting, and X-Men featuring an all-female X-Men team, Amazing X-Men became the main title to feature Wolverine's X-Men team, replacing Marjorie Liu's Astonishing X-Men, which ended a month before. The premiere issue featured Firestar in her first appearance as a member of the X-Men, though she made her Marvel Comics debut in Uncanny X-Men #193 (1985) as a member of the X-Men's rival team, the Hellions.

Starting with issue #8, Aaron was replaced by former New X-Men and X-Force writers Craig Kyle and Christopher Yost as series writers. In issue #8, Colossus rejoins the X-Men after being last seen being part of Cable's X-Force. This series was cancelled with issue #19.

=== 2025 ===
In July 2025, Marvel Comics announced the "Age of Revelation" event, which debuted in October 2025. Amazing X-Men (vol. 3), by writer Jed MacKay and artist Mahmud Asrar, was the flagship title for the X-Men line during the event. The first issue released on October 8, 2025.

Set ten years in the future, "Age of Revelation" focuses on a new mutant utopia led by Apocalypse's heir Doug Ramsey; however, the Revelation Territories were "built on a lie and threatens to overwhelm the earth and destroy humanity, leading a band of X-Men to foment rebellion". ComicsXF explained this event has a similar format to previous events such as Age of X-Man (2019) and Sins of Sinister (2023) where Marvel shuts "down a bunch of ongoing series" to relaunch "them with new names and concepts".

== Team roster ==
| Issues | Years | Roster |
|---|---|---|
| 1-6 | 2013 | Beast, Firestar, Iceman, Nightcrawler, Northstar, Storm, Wolverine |
| 7 | 2014 | Firestar, Iceman, Spider-Man |
| 8-12 | 2014 | Colossus, Firestar, Iceman, Marvel Girl, Nightcrawler, Northstar, Rockslide, Storm, Wolverine |
| 13 | 2014 | Anole, Nightcrawler, Northstar |
| 14 | 2014 | Mystique, Nightcrawler |
| 15-19 | 2015 | Colossus, Firestar, Iceman, Pixie, Marvel Girl, Nightcrawler, Northstar, Rockslide, Storm |

== Collected Editions ==
=== Volume 1 ===
| Title | Material Collected | Publication Date | ISBN |
|---|---|---|---|
| Amazing X-Men: Ultimate Edition | Amazing X-Men (vol. 1) #1-4 | 1995 | |
| X-Men: The Complete Age Of Apocalypse Epic Book 2 | Amazing X-Men (vol. 1) #1-2 | August 2006 | 0785122648 |
| X-Men: The Complete Age Of Apocalypse Epic Book 3 | Amazing X-Men (vol. 1) #3 | April 2006 | 0785120513 |
| X-Men: The Complete Age Of Apocalypse Epic Book 4 | Amazing X-Men (vol. 1) #4 | November 2006 | 0785120521 |
| X-Men: The Age of Apocalypse Book 1 - Alpha | Amazing X-Men (vol. 1) #1 | September 2015 | |
| X-Men: The Age of Apocalypse Book 2 - Reign | Amazing X-Men (vol. 1) #2-3 | October 2015 | |
| X-Men: The Age of Apocalypse Book 3 - Omega | Amazing X-Men (vol. 1) #4 | January 2016 | |
| X-Men: The Age of Apocalypse Omnibus (New Printing) | Amazing X-Men (vol. 1) #1-4 | April 2016 | |

=== Volume 2 ===
| # | Title | Material Collected | Pages | Publication Date | ISBN |
|---|---|---|---|---|---|
| 1 | The Quest for Nightcrawler | Amazing X-Men (vol. 2) #1-6 | 136 | July 1, 2014 | 978-0785188216 |
| 2 | World War Wendigo | Amazing X-Men (vol. 2) #7-12 | 136 | January 6, 2015 | 978-0785188223 |
| 3 | Once and Future Juggernaut | Amazing X-Men (vol. 2) #13-19, Annual #1 | 184 | July 7, 2015 | 978-0785192480 |
