= Howl's Moving Castle =

Howl's Moving Castle may refer to:

- Howl's Moving Castle (novel), 1986, by Diana Wynne Jones
- Howl's Moving Castle (film), 2004, directed by Hayao Miyazaki, loosely based on Jones' novel
