= Castle in the Air (novel) =

1990 fantasy novel by Diana Wynne Jones

- First edition (UK)
- Author: Diana Wynne Jones
- Cover artist: Alan Fraser
- Language: English
- Series: Howl's Castle
- Genre: Fantasy, children's novel
- Publisher: Methuen Publishing
- Publication date: 1990
- Publication place: United Kingdom
- Media type: Hard & paperback
- ISBN: 0-416-15782-3
- OCLC: 47840983
- Preceded by: Howl's Moving Castle
- Followed by: House of Many Ways

Castle in the Air is a young adult fantasy novel written by Diana Wynne Jones and first published in 1990. The novel is a sequel to Howl's Moving Castle and is set in the same fantasy world, though it follows the adventures of Abdullah rather than Sophie Hatter. The plot is based on stories from the Arabian Nights. The book features many of the characters from Howl's Moving Castle as supporting characters, often under some sort of disguise.

== Plot summary ==
Castle in the Air follows the adventures of Abdullah, a handsome young carpet salesman from Zanzib, who daydreams constantly about being a stolen prince. One day a strange traveler comes to his stand to sell a magic carpet. During the night, Abdullah goes to sleep on the carpet but wakes up to find himself in a beautiful garden with a young woman. He tells the woman, Flower-in-the-Night, that he is the stolen prince of his daydreams, believing that he is in fact dreaming. Flower-in-the-Night, who has never seen a man other than her father, first believes that Abdullah is a woman, so Abdullah agrees to return the next night with portraits of many men so that she can make a proper comparison. He does so, and Abdullah and Flower-in-the-Night decide to get married.

Abdullah returns the next night, but he arrives just as Flower-in-the-Night is snatched away by a huge flying djinn. Soon after, the Sultan of Zanzib captures Abdullah who then discovers that Princess Flower is actually the Sultan's daughter. Enraged that his daughter is missing, the Sultan blames Abdullah and throws him in jail, threatening to impale him on a 40-foot stake if his daughter is not found. Fortunately, Abdullah is saved by his magic carpet and escapes from Zanzib.

Abdullah ends up in the desert and stumbles upon a group of bandits, who have in their possession a particularly cranky genie who grants only one wish a day. In the night, Abdullah steals the genie and flees. After a wish, Abdullah is transported to Ingary and ends up traveling with a bitter Strangian soldier whose country was recently taken in a war with Ingary. While traveling to Kingsbury in search of a wizard, the two stumble upon a cat and her kitten, whom the soldier names Midnight and Whippersnapper, respectively.

As they travel, Abdullah wishes for the return of his flying carpet, who brings with it the very Djinn that kidnapped Princess Flower-in-the-Night. It is revealed that the Djinn, Hasruel, is being forced to kidnap princesses from all over the world by his brother, Dalzel. The two proceed on the carpet to Kingsbury, which is where they find Wizard Suliman, who, upon realizing that Midnight is actually a person in cat form, returns her to being a human. As the spell is lifted from the woman, who turns out to be Sophie Pendragon, her baby, Morgan, is returned to his normal self as well. When they go to collect the baby, however, he is no longer in the inn, where he was left with the soldier.

Abdullah and Sophie then order the carpet to take them to Morgan. The carpet does so, taking them far into the sky, to the castle in the air, which is merely Wizard Howl's castle, having been greatly enlarged. There they meet the abducted princesses and plot with them to escape the flying moving castle. Led by Abdullah, they overpower the two Djinn, freeing Hasruel, who banishes his brother. Flower-in-the-Night had by then wished the Genie free, who turned out to be Sophie's husband and little Morgan's father, the topmost-level wizard Howl Pendragon.

== Characters ==
- Abdullah is the protagonist of the story, a carpet merchant who is very unlucky with fate. He loves to daydream and dream that he is the long-lost prince of a far-away kingdom. He buys an enchanted, flying carpet from a shifty man. He is constantly pestered by his father's first wife's relations, and feels that he is always at the bottom of "the pecking order" no matter what company he is in.
- Jamal is Abdullah's one-eyed friend who owns the stall next to Abdullah that sells cooked squid. He is later wished into becoming the cook at the djinn's castle, but later secures a job as the cook for Hilda of High Norland, one of the kidnapped princesses. He has a very protective dog that hates all of mankind, save for Abdullah and Jamal.
- Princess Flower-in-the-Night is Abdullah's true love who is kidnapped by the djinn. A well-educated young woman, Princess Flower-in-the-Night is as beautiful as she is clever, but she knows almost nothing beyond what she has read in books. At birth, she was prophesied to marry the first man she saw who was not her father. Because her father wanted her to marry a powerful man from another nation, he ensured that she would not see any man until he had brought a prince from a powerful kingdom. As a result, she initially mistakes Abdullah for a woman.
- The Strangian Soldier is a wandering Strangian soldier who is cunning, selfish, and opportunistic. He treats the cats unusually well, but doesn't bother with helping other people unless it benefits him. When Hasruel is freed, it is revealed that the soldier is Prince Justin, enchanted by Hasruel into believing he was a defeated Strangian soldier after the Battle of Strangia, and had been looking for the missing Princess Beatrice, to whom he had been reluctantly betrothed.
- The Genie is a troublesome genie whose wishes normally cause trouble, rather than fortune. The genie is eventually revealed to be none other than Wizard Howl, who had fallen under Hasruel's spell. The flying moving castle belongs to Howl; Hasruel stole it from him to hold the princesses.
- Dalzel is a weak and feeble djinn who chooses wickedness rather than goodness. He forces Hasruel to find for him all the princesses to be his wives, as no female djinn will have him. He is thwarted and banished, not altogether unhappily as the two fat women agree to be his brides.
- Hasruel is Dalzel's brother and a holy djinn. His "life", the one part of a djinn that can be killed, has been stolen and hidden by his brother Dalzel, and he must obey his brother and kidnap princesses from around the world or Dalzel will destroy his "life". At the end of the story, he is unable to rejoin the good djinn due to enjoying his evil acts.
- Princess Beatrice is the Princess of Strangia, a strong-minded young woman capable of rugged activities. After the Battle of Strangia, she is engaged to Prince Justin to solidify Ingary's control of the nation, but she runs away and is subsequently kidnapped by Hasruel. Among the kidnapped princesses, she is most vocal and defiant, acting as their apparent leader, while Princess Flower-in-the-Night acts as their strategist. She agrees to marry the Strangian Soldier to secure his cooperation in the princesses' plot to defeat Dalzel and follows through, even after he is disenchanted and revealed to be Prince Justin. She is mentioned in House of Many Ways as the Queen of Strangia.
- Benjamin Sullivan/Wizard Suliman is one of two of the topmost royal sorcerers. With Howl gone mysteriously, he is tasked with keeping Princess Valeria safe from the Djinn. He is able to restore Midnight (Sophie) and Whippersnapper (baby Morgan) to their human forms, but is distracted at a crucial moment when Hasruel attacks, allowing Valeria to be taken. He is married to Leticia "Lettie" Hatter, making him Sophie and Howl's brother-in-law.
- Letitia "Lettie" Suliman, formerly Lettie Hatter from Howl's Moving Castle, is now a fully qualified top sorceress and married to Ben Sullivan. Though qualified, her husband prefers to hide her strong magic from the general public. She is expecting their first child.
- Midnight is a highly intelligent, spoiled black cat who is cherished by the soldier and regarded with suspicion by Abdullah. She is able to grow to the size of a panther to defend herself and her kitten. She is later revealed to be Sophie Hatter, a returning character from the first book Howl's Moving Castle. As a human she is a beautiful red-haired witch that can weave magic into items talking to them, such as scolding an archway to not allow for eavesdropping. She is married to High Wizard Howl, and was turned into a black cat by him right before the castle was stolen.
- Whippersnapper is a Midnight/Sophie's kitten, but actually the human child Morgan, who was born as a kitten due to his mother being transformed into a cat during labour and would ride under the soldier's hat from place to place. He is at the top of the pecking order and fairly capable as a kitten.

Other characters that appear in the novel include the members of Abdullah's father's first wife's family, Fatima, Assif, and Hakim, who inherited a very large carpet emporium upon Abdullah's father's death. After Abdullah escapes from the Sultan's prison they are targeted due to being his only family but they escape into the desert and aren't heard from again. Two fat women are introduced by the family to Abdullah to be his first two wives as a man of his age should already be married. Abdullah manages to talk his way out of being married to them at that time and they are not mentioned again until the end of the story when they are revealed to have been imprisoned by the Sultan of Zanzib in the place of the family. Abdullah has Hasruel magically transport them to the castle in the air where they agree to marry Dalzel who is ecstatic to have two beautiful and fat brides. In the novel, many princesses kidnapped by Hasruel are also introduced.
