= House of Many Ways =

Book by Diana Wynne Jones

- First US edition
- Author: Diana Wynne Jones
- Illustrator: Tim Stevens
- Cover artist: Cover designers include John Rocco, Nina Tara, Duncan Smith, Marie-Alice Harel, and Paul Zakris.
- Language: English
- Series: Howl's Castle
- Subject: When Charmain is asked to housesit for Great-Uncle William, the Royal Wizard of Norland, she is ecstatic to get away from her parents, only to find that his house is much more than it seems.
- Genre: Fantasy, young adult literature
- Publisher: Greenwillow Books
- Publication date: 7 June 2008 (USA)
- Publication place: Great Britain
- Media type: Hardback
- Pages: 335
- ISBN: 978-0-06-147795-9 (United States hardback)
- OCLC: 175053441
- LC Class: PZ7.J684 Hq 2008
- Preceded by: Castle in the Air

House of Many Ways is a young adult fantasy novel written by Diana Wynne Jones. The story is set in the same world as Howl's Moving Castle and Castle in the Air.

== Summary ==
Charmain Baker has had no experience with household chores. She was assigned to care for the house of her relative, William, who is also the Royal Wizard of Norland, and the house contains spatial and temporal anomalies.

Though she is supposed to clean up the mess William has left the house in, Charmain knows next to nothing about magic, and yet she seems to work it in the most unexpected way. The house's single door can lead to almost any place – from other rooms like the kitchen, to faraway places like the Royal Palace, and even other time periods. In her first days in the magical house she ends up looking after a magical stray dog named Waif, encounters a horrible lubbock, has to share a roof with a confused young apprentice wizard named Peter, tries to work some spells from William's library, and deals with a clan of small blue creatures called Kobolds.

When Charmain is caught up in an intense royal search to remedy the kingdom's financial troubles, she encounters Sophie Pendragon, her son Morgan, a beautiful child named Twinkle, and their fire demon Calcifer. One of the messes Twinkle gets Charmain into results in Twinkle climbing onto the roof of the Royal Mansion. She is soon involved in curing the kingdom of its ills and rediscovering the long-lost mystical Elfgift.
