= List of fictional Welsh people =

The following notable Welsh characters have appeared in fictional works.

== Novels ==
- Wizard Howl in the fantasy novel Howl's Moving Castle
- William Herondale in the young adult fiction book trilogy The Infernal Devices of The Shadowhunter Chronicles franchise.

== Comics ==
Marvel characters:

- Jessica Jones (although adopted, her adoptive surname, "Jones", is of Welsh origin)
- Pixie (X-Men) (Megan Gwynn).
- Damian Tryp (Dafydd ap Andras).
  - Andras Tryp (Damian's son).
- Red dragon ([Female]? & [Male] Gareth Thomas).
- Sir Gawain (Dai Thomas).
- Stinger (Blodwen Reese).
- Doctor Claw (Dafydd ap Rhys).
- Arthur Pendragon (Dafydd ap Iorwerth).
- Captain Wales (Huw Gruffydd).
- Captain Cymru (Morwen Powell).
- Captain Prydain (Lloyd Thomas).
- Bryn (Bryan Hengist)
- Captain Francis Percy Blake (Blake & Mortimer Belgian comic book series)

== Children's books ==
- Fireman Sam a Welsh fire-fighter

== Video games ==
- Richard Wesley is a spy in the game Wolfenstein: The Old Blood.
- Knight L. Rhys is a soldier of the Brotherhood of Steel in the game Fallout 4. His surname suggests he is of Welsh descent.
- Lisa Trevor is a test subject at the Umbrella Corporation in Resident Evil. She is a pinnacle character within the story as she helped the corporation create the G-Virus.
- Edward Kenway is the protagonist of Assassin's Creed IV: Black Flag. He is voiced by Welsh actor Matt Ryan, and was rewritten to be Welsh following Ryan's casting. The character is explicitly referred to as a Welshman from Swansea within the game, with his Cardiff upbringing expanded upon in the games' novelisation.
- Nia is a Driver in the game Xenoblade Chronicles 2. She originates from the fictional nation of Gormott, but speaks in a Welsh accent.
- Mio is one of the main protagonists of Xenoblade Chronicles 3. She originates from the fictional nation of Agnus, equivalent to the world of Xenoblade Chronicles 2, and sports a Welsh accent.

== Film ==
- Larry Talbot, a character in the 1941 film The Wolf Man
- Princess Eilonwy, a character in the 1985 film The Black Cauldron

== TV shows ==
- List of Fireman Sam characters
- Mr. Cheeseman (Dad's Army)
- Huw Edwards (EastEnders)
- Andy Davidson (Torchwood)
- Tom Price (Survivors)
- Rhys Williams (Torchwood)
- Gwyn Davies (Legends of Tomorrow)
