= DNX (comics) =

2026 comic book crossover storyline

- Publisher: Marvel Comics
- Publication date: September – November 2026
- Main character(s): X-Men; Fantastic Four; 3K

Creative team
- Writer: Jed MacKay
- Artist: Federico Vicentini

"DNX" is a 2026 five-issue comic book crossover storyline published in the X-Men franchise of books by Marvel Comics. The event involves the mutant group 3K planning to unleash the mutagenic X-Virus as they end up contending with the X-Men and the Fantastic Four.

== Publication history ==
On April 30, 2026, the DNX storyline was announced. The series involves the X-Men and the Fantastic Four working to prevent 3K from releasing the mutagenic X-Virus, which was first seen during the "Age of Revelation" storyline. The X-Virus was recreated in the present day by the Chairman of 3K (Beast).

== Plot ==
The chairman of 3K (the original Beast) prepares to release the X-Virus from 3K's airship headquarters above Philadelphia. In the Baxter Building, Beast's clone and Ben Liu meet with Mister Fantastic to tend to Magneto, who is in critical condition after being attacked by the Chairman. Mister Fantastic states that he will help save Magneto's life. However, he believes Magneto to be too dangerous and refuses to restore his powers, which were weakened by an illness apparently related to his past resurrection. Meanwhile, in Philadelphia, Quentin Quire locates 3K's airship, allowing the X-Men to attack. Juggernaut sabotages the X-Virus's release, but the Chairman activates a backup that releases the X-Virus in Juniper, Pennsylvania.

During the X-Men's attack on 3K, most of 3K's forces are taken out, with Cassandra Nova being left brain-dead after a battle with Quire and Jean Grey. Meanwhile, in the X-Men's absence, their home base in the Factory is attacked by Z*E*R*O*. Xorn contacts John Greycrow, enlisting him to protect the Factory. Greycrow goes on the attack and kills several of the Z*E*R*O* agents. He also finds that Xorn took out the Z*E*R*O* agents who tried to attack the comatose Glob Herman. However, Xorn reveals that he never went to the medical wing where Herman was held. A flashback reveals that Herman briefly regained consciousness and took out his attackers.

At the launch bay, Wyre takes out the airship's engines, which will cause it to crash into Philadelphia. Meanwhile, Cyclops tries to enlist Frank Bohannan and the Office of National Emergency to quarantine Juniper. After Thing and Human Torch return from the airship, Invisible Woman states that the Fantastic Four will enter Magneto's body in a shrunken state to treat him. Quire works on evacuating Philadelphia as Liu holds back the falling airship. The Fantastic Four succeed in curing Magneto, who helps stop the airship from crashing. At the Baxter Building, Mister Fantastic reveals that he has the information necessary to stop the X-Virus.

Beast and Mister Fantastic use data recovered from Magneto's body to create a micro-organism that will neutralize the X-Virus. In Juniper, the Chairman finds that the X-Virus did not work as intended, successfully mutating civilians but leaving them deformed. The X-Men and the Fantastic Four find that the Chairman has erected a force field around Juniper, which inadvertently contains the X-Virus. Believing the mutated residents of Juniper to be beyond saving, the Chairman intends to kill them and destroy Juniper with a fusion bomb. Cyclops persuades the Chairman to let him come in, intending to kill him.

In a flashback to the earlier days of the X-Men, Cyclops meets Beast for the first time, comforting him when he states that he fears his own potential. In the present, Cyclops confronts the Chairman, who states that he put himself first before the advancement of mutants. As Cyclops brings a building down on the Chairman, he manages to get out and knock off Cyclops' visor. Cyclops manages to stab the Chairman in the left eye and fire an optic blast to take him down. The fusion bomb goes off, but is weakened due to Cyclops removing its power cells. Psylocke leaves the decontamination process to the Fantastic Four as the X-Men leave. Cyclops survives the explosion, but is taken away by the Chairman.

== Issues involved ==
=== Lead-up issues ===
- X-Men (vol. 7) #35-36

=== Main issue ===
- DNX #1-5

=== Tie-in issues ===
- DNX: True Believers Blind Bags #1
- Fantastic Four (vol. 8) #17-18
- X-Men (vol. 7) #37-41

=== Aftermath issue ===
- Jean Grey (vol. 3) #1
- X-Men (vol. 7) #42-44
- X-Men United #11
