= Pixie (X-Men) =

Marvel Comics superheroine

- Pixie as depicted in Way of X #3 (June 2021). Art by Felipe Massafera.

Publication information
- Publisher: Marvel Comics
- First appearance: New X-Men: Academy X #5 (November 2004)
- Created by: Nunzio DeFilippis; Christina Weir; Michael Ryan

In-story information
- Alter ego: Megan Gwynn
- Species: Human mutant / fairy hybrid
- Team affiliations: Jean Grey School Students; Paragons training squad X-Men-In-Training; Xavier Institute; New X-Men; The Lights; X-Men
- Notable aliases: Winged Witch
- Abilities: Hallucinogenic "pixie dust" power causing auditory and visual hallucinations; Flight via insectoid wings; Spell casting granting: Inter-dimensional teleportation; Demons banishment; Sleeping spell; Souldagger granting: Ability to harm both magical and non-magical beings and entities; Ability to disrupt magical spells, objects, and constructs

Pixie (Megan Gwynn) is a superheroine appearing in American comic books published by Marvel Comics. Hailing from Wales, Pixie belongs to the subspecies of humans called mutants, who are born with superhuman abilities, and to the species of humanoid magical beings named fairies, who are born with supernatural powers. Her hybrid mutation grants her pixie-like eyes, colorful wings that allow her to fly, and "pixie dust" that causes hallucinations.

After a confrontation with the revived former member of the New Mutants, Magik, she gains the ability to use magic and a magical weapon called the "Souldagger." Her main use of magic is a massive teleportation spell, which makes her a key asset to various X-Men missions and teams and places her as one of the titles' primary magic users. She was first introduced as a student on the Paragons training squad at the Xavier Institute in New X-Men: Academy X #5 (November 2004), later joining the New X-Men team, and then graduating to the Uncanny X-Men team.

Pixie has been described as one of Marvel's most notable and powerful female heroes. Since her original introduction in comics, the character has been featured in various other Marvel-licensed products, including video games, animated television series, and merchandise.

== Publication history ==
=== 2010s ===
Pixie debuted in New X-Men: Academy X #5 (November 2004), created by Nunzio DeFilippis, Christina Weir, and Michael Ryan. She appeared in the 2008 X-Men: Pixies and Demons one-shot, her first solo comic book one-shot. She appeared in the 2010 X-Men: Pixie Strikes Back series, her first solo comic book series. She appeared in the 2010 Avengers vs. X-Men anthology series. She appeared in the 2019 Age of X-Man: Nextgen series.

=== 2020s ===
Pixie appeared in the 2020 Cable series. She appeared in the 2021 Children of the Atom series. She appeared in the 2022 Legion of X series.

== Fictional character biography ==
Megan Gwynn is a Welsh teenager from the fictional mining town of Abergylid. After her father died in a mining accident, Gwynn left Wales. She would later discover that the villainous Mastermind was her real father. Originally, Gwynn had short pink hair, pure black eyes, and rainbow butterfly-like wings.

After enrolling at the Xavier Institute, Gwynn joins the Paragons under the tutelage of Rahne Sinclair. Following the events of "House of M", almost all of the Institute's students are depowered, with Gwynn being one of only twenty-seven students to retain their powers.

=== Quest For Magik ===
Gwynn, Blindfold and her classmates are sucked into the realm of Limbo, where they are attacked by demons. After Darkchilde saves the group, she asks N'astirh to bring Gwynn to her. Despite her friends' pleas, Gwynn submits to Magik's request to use her soul to create a Soulsword and Bloodstones, magical stones forged from an innocent soul. Anole's intervention saves her, but leaves the spell unfinished, resulting in the creation of only one Bloodstone and a "Souldagger" instead. Magik explains that the Souldagger is a portion of Gwynn's own soul and that the remainder of her soul has been filled with black magic.

=== Messiah Complex ===
When the first new mutant since M-Day appears, Gwynn joins X-23, Hellion, Anole, Surge, Armor, and Rockslide in attacking the Purifiers' base. Outnumbered, Gwynn panics and cannot teleport the team out until Rictor, who infiltrated the Purifiers as a spy, helps her concentrate. She manages to cast a hazardous "blind teleport", which scatters the X-Men between Washington, D.C., and the Xavier Institute. Predator X later attacks the Institute, going after the weaker, wounded students in the infirmary. Gwynn, realizing that X-23 had killed this type of creature before, attempts to teleport Predator X to X-23's location. However, she mistakenly takes the majority of the students and Beast alongside her and the creature, dropping them in the middle of the X-Men's fight for the mutant baby with the Marauders on Muir Island. During the fight, Gwynn is brutally beaten by the Malice-possessed Omega Sentinel, but stabs her with the Souldagger, exorcising Malice from Omega Sentinel's body.

=== Pixies and Demons ===
Gwynn returns to her hometown after the X-Men disband following the conclusion of Messiah Complex. However, she finds the demonic N'Garai are plaguing the town and are kidnapping people to feed their leader Kierrok. She calls in the X-Men to help defeat the N'Garai, and Gwynn has to face her fear of the mine in which her father was killed to defeat the demons. After defeating Kierrok, Cyclops and the rest of the X-Men take Gwynn back to America and she joins the newly reformed X-Men in San Francisco.

=== X-Infernus ===
Despite her cheerful persona, Gwynn begins to reveal her anger and bitterness over her initial experience in Limbo and her incomplete soul, feeling that she is less than human. During a training session, Nightcrawler points out that her personality changes when she uses the Souldagger. This causes her to summon it and her personality turns sinister. She stabs him in the chest, causing him to pass out. Upon regaining her senses and removing the dagger, she finds that it has freed the Soulsword housed within Nightcrawler's body. Sensing the Soulsword, Magik teleports to Earth to reclaim it. However, Gwynn engages her in a fight, demanding to have the stolen portion of her soul returned, and refuses to hand over the sword. Magik defeats Gwynn and regains her Soulsword, teleporting away.

While the X-Men battle demons in Limbo, Witchfire defeats Magik and adds Gwynn's Bloodstone to her amulet, causing her to lose control and teleport to Belasco's castle. There, Witchfire forces her to become her new apprentice and begins forging another Bloodstone from Gwynn's soul, causing her to transform into a demon. Witchfire uses the Bloodstones to summon the Elder Gods to her aid. Gwynn is reluctantly forced to work together with Magik to defeat Witchfire. While the X-Men battle the Elder Gods, Magik fights Witchfire and strips her of the amulet containing the Bloodstones. Magik and Gwynn use their blades to destroy the amulet, but Witchfire escapes.

=== Pixie Strikes Back ===
Gwynn finds herself and several of her teenage teammates under a spell, causing them to live under the impression that they are ordinary high school girls. However, the illusion begins to fade, with Gwynn finding herself in confrontation with the demon Saturnine. Meanwhile, a woman arrives on Utopia claiming to be her mother, demanding to see her. Later, her mother shows up in the Wyngarde mansion, where Lady Mastermind is fighting with Martinique. She tells them to stop acting like the babies of the family and that they have been usurped while Gwynn is seen in the next panel, revealing that Jason Wyngarde is her biological father, and the Mastermind sisters are her siblings.

=== X-Men: Second Coming ===
When Cable and Hope Summers return from the future, Bastion starts putting his plans into action in taking her out. He first begins by taking out the X-Men's teleporters, sending Magik to Limbo with a weaponized spell. Gwynn is placed on a rescue team to get Magik back from Limbo, where she encounters N'astirh. He tries to convince her to kill Magik and in exchange he will restore Gwynn's soul. However, Gwynn turns on N'astirh and frees Magik.

=== X-Men: Schism ===
During the events of "Schism", Gwynn has been teleporting various teams of X-Men around the world to combat Sentinels. During one fight she injures her hands and has to sit out as she can no longer teleport. According to her, without painkillers, it hurts too much to concentrate, and with them, she cannot think straight enough but will still stand by her fellow students to help take on the giant sentinel approaching Utopia.

=== Regenesis ===
Recovering from the events of Schism, Gwynn approaches Velocidad at first to get help with her medication but when they start talking, things become quite flirty between them and eventually start kissing. Hope walks in and catches them in the act and storms out. Gwynn then slaps Velocidad and leaves. She is later packing to return to Westchester when Hope approaches and begs her to join her team, as they need a teleporter.

After a training exercise, Hope finds a new light on Cerebra and has Gwynn teleport the group to Pakistan to locate the mutant. The group splits up with Pixie teamed with Velocidad. They are ambushed by soldiers and separated. Gwynn ends up captured by them and after being rescued, teleports the team and an amnesic Sebastian Shaw back to Utopia.

=== Wolverine and the X-Men ===
Gwynn graduated from the Jean Grey School for Higher Learning and became an official X-Man in the final issue of Wolverine and the X-Men.

== Powers and abilities ==
Megan Gwynn possesses insect-like wings (depicted of various colors depending on the artist) that allow her to fly. Initially, her wings were broad and multicolored, similar to a butterfly's, but recent depictions show her to have iridescent, translucent wings, more like those of a dragonfly. It has been suggested that her wings' appearance is affected by her psychological state. In addition, her mutation allows her to produce a "pixie dust" that causes hallucinations, often with comedic effects, such as demons seeing bright bubbles and teddy bears, or in one instance, causing Wolverine to see and try to fight a herd of unicorns. In another instance, Gwynn uses her dust seemingly harmlessly to enhance the audience's perceptions of Dazzler's light show during a concert. She states that she has no idea what individuals affected by her dust are seeing.

After Magik takes part of Gwynn's soul in an attempt to create a Soulsword, Gwynn gained the ability to detect the supernatural, describing the dark portion of her soul as a compass that detects other sources of dark magic.

Because the spell to steal Megan Gwynn's soul was interrupted, a new Soulsword could not be formed. Instead, Gwynn can summon a Souldagger, a mystical item that disrupts magic and harms magical beings. Because of her connection with Magik, as Gwynn uses the Souldagger, her personality changes and becomes darker.

Though untrained in the mystic arts, Megan Gwynn is able to wield magic, largely due to black magic which has filled the missing portions of her soul. She is capable of teleporting herself and large groups over vast distances and across dimensions with relative ease, though teleporting without focusing can be hazardous, causing those transported to be scattered and potentially harming herself. Gwynn has also been able to banish demons using magic.

== Reception ==
=== Critical response ===
Mike Fugere of Comic Book Resources wrote, "Megan Gwynn, the adorably cheerful mutant with rainbow fairy wings known as Pixie, was created by husband and wife writing team Nunzio DeFilippis and Christina Weir along with artist Michael Ryan (Mystique, New Excalibur). Pixie made her first appearance in New X-Men: Academy X #5 back in 2004. Her exuberant attitude towards her fellow classmates at the Xavier Institute earned the title of Xavier's “Friendliest Student.” Considering Pixie's effervescent attitude and pink haired, iridescent-winged exterior, there's really no better candidate for the superlative. Even Jubilee, at her most jovial, was never as warm and welcoming as Pixie. But don't let her adorable veneer lead you astray. Megan Gwynn packs quite a punch." Deirdre Kaye of Scary Mommy called Pixie a "role model" and a "truly heroic" female character. Chris Condry of Looper stated, "Pixie, whose real name is Megan Gwynn, is just as fun and fascinating as her older, bluer counterpart and has far more potential in the coming decades. Unlike Nightcrawler, Gwynn is far from a one-trick pony. In addition to teleportation, Gwynn's powers include flight, emitting hallucinogenic pixie dust, daggers made from her own soul, and most importantly, spell-casting. As a budding sorcerer, Gwynn's potential is almost limitless. During the "Dark Reign" event, she was even considered as a candidate to replace Doctor Strange as the next Sorcerer Supreme. Both mutant and magic, Pixie has a rare place in multiple Marvel arenas and could slot into the MCU in a few different ways. Though Pixie has mostly been relegated to the kids' table and considered a "Young X-Men" or "New Mutant," her power, personality, and promise are starting to make her too big for her highchair."

Timothy Adams of ComicBook.com called Pixie a "fan-favorite." Robert Mclaughlin of Den of Geek said, "While Cyclops, Storm, Wolverine, Gambit and some of the more popular characters have already made their screen debut, there's still over one hundred-and-ninety-eight mutants for the filmmakers to play with, and if Riptide and Azazel can be made to look cool, then some more of these more obscure, yet visually exciting mutants can too. Megan Gwynn is a Welsh mutant with a visually fun physical mutation. Sporting pink hair, large fairy wings and pointy ears, her mutant power is the ability to teleport and to sprinkle hallucination-based pixie dust on her opponents. A current fan favourite, she's a relatively recent addition to the X-Men team, having originally appeared in the continually re-titled X-Men Academy/New X-Men. The addition of a bright, visually appealing and fun character with a jovial light-hearted 'bubble gum pop' personality would replace the flying character of Angel from the first movie. And having an upbeat, positive member of the team would make a break from the angst of the rest of the team," while Marc Buxton included her in their "40 X-Men Characters Who Haven't Appeared in the Movies But Should" list. George Marston of Newsarama included Pixie in their "20 X-Men Characters That Should Make The Jump From Marvel Comics To The MCU" list and said, "Marvel Studios is doubling down on its magical wing as one of the tentpoles of its current era, and there are few better mutants to connect a new X-Men team to that corner of the MCU than the ethereal, effervescent Pixie—whose fae codename is a perfect indicator of her powers, which include a pair of gossamer wings, teleportation, and a natural aptitude for magical skill. And not for nothing, if the MCU needs some youthful mutants for a younger-skewing X-Men team—or even some students in some capacity—Pixie makes for a spot-on addition as an ingenue for a team that always has at least one young, impressionable mutant in its ranks." ComicsAlliance gave Pixie a score of 38 out of 50 in their "100 X-Men: How Do Sunspot, Pixie, Leech, Revanche And Quicksilver Rate As Great X-Men?" list.

Trudy Graham of Zavvi included Pixie in their "10 Characters From Marvel Comics We Want To See In The MCU" list, writing, "There are several X-Men that act as a supportive glue for teams, and she's one of them. Her powers are also a lot of fun" Andrew Ceco of Sideshow included Pixie in their "Marvel's Most Masterful Witches" list. John Tibbetts of WhatCulture ranked Pixie 2nd in their "Marvel Phase 4: 10 Mutants Who Should Be MCU X-Men" list and said, "Pixie is one of those characters that you have to actually be dead inside to not absolutely love. She's bubbly, friendly, has boundless optimism, but is also the first one to kick your ass six ways from Sunday if you cause trouble. Her pixie wings give her the ability to fly, almost twice as fast as Angel when she sets her mind to it, she can release "pixie dust" that gives anyone it hits powerful hallucinations, and also she's a witch. Like a straight up candidate for sorcerer supreme should Doctor Strange ever bite it. Sure right now she can just barely conjure up a sleeping spell and the ability to teleport, but all of this alone makes her a natural fit for the X-Men should Marvel be smart enough to realize the money printer Pixie could prove to be in marketing if they pull her off right." Anya Crittenton of Gay Star News ranked Pixie 3rd in their "7 LGBTI Heroes We Want to See in Marvel's New All-Female TV Series" list. Alyssa Gawaran of MovieWeb ranked Pixie 8th in their "8 LGBTQ+ Marvel Comics Characters That Need to Be in the MCU" list. Matthew Perpetua of BuzzFeed ranked Pixie 41st in their "95 X-Men Members Ranked From Worst To Best" list, saying, "Pixie is basically like a mashup of Magik and Jubilee—she's got the former's teleportation and magical powers, but has the spunky, sarcastic qualities of the latter. For a while it seemed like she was brought into the cast to fill the obligatory "teenage girl" role, but she's developed into a more nuanced character over time despite having an increasingly smaller role in the franchise." Darren Franich of Entertainment Weekly ranked Pixie 64th in their "Let's Rank Every X-Man Ever" list.

Screen Rant ranked Pixie 6th in their "15 Most Powerful X-Men Members Who Joined in the 2000s (Ranked)" list. Comic Book Resources ranked Pixie 9th in their "10 Best Fights From Avengers Vs X-Men" list, 20th in their "20 Most Powerful Supernatural Marvel Characters" list, 20th in their "20 X-Men Who Are Much More Powerful Than They Look" list, and 25th in their "25 Most Powerful Young X-Men" list.

== Literary reception ==
=== Volumes ===
==== X-Men: Pixies and Demons (2008) ====
According to Diamond Comic Distributors, X-Men: Pixies and Demons #1 was the 123rd best selling comic book in November 2008.

==== X-Men: Pixie Strikes Back (2010) ====
===== Issue 1 =====
According to Diamond Comic Distributors, X-Men: Pixie Strikes Back #1 was the 114th best selling comic book in February 2010.

James Hunt of Comic Book Resources called X-Men: Pixie Strikes Back #1 an "interesting spin on the character," saying, "One of the reasons Pixie has been steadily growing in popularity is that the character's visual is rather more striking than many of her peers. The fairy wings, pink hair and dark eyes make her as iconic as any of the "classic" X-Men, and Sara Pichelli does the character justice with her artwork. Indeed, all the characters. In Immonen and Pichelli, Marvel have managed to find a fantastic creative team (and, letterer aside, an all-female at that) with a distinctive and original take on the X-Men. Compared to the rather dour and homogenous feeling most of the line has at the moment, this can't help but stand out. It might not have an event to piggyback on, but it is, undoubtedly, a worthwhile purchase for all current X-fans." Bryan Joel of IGN gave X-Men: Pixie Strikes Back #1 a grade of 7.2 out of 10, writing, "All signs point to Pixie Strikes Back veering more into traditional territory down the line, but as far as this issue's concerned, it's a welcomed alternate take on the junior team with some unexpected wit from Immonen and more than a few charming qualities. Basically, if you were put off by the idea of a mini-series called Pixie Strikes Back, issue #1 is probably not going to change your tune. If you can get past that, however, it's a cool little X-curio."

==== Issue 2 ====
According to Diamond Comic Distributors, X-Men: Pixie Strikes Back #2 was the 154th best-selling comic book in March 2010.

Greg McElhatton of Comic Book Resources described X-Men: Pixie Strikes Back #2 as an "enticing read," asserting, "X-Men: Pixie Strikes Back! may look like another disposable mutant mini-series, but Immonen's snappy script is strong enough that it's quietly beating the odds. If all mini-series and one-offs were this strong, I think we'd have a lot more happy customers in the store buying them." Dan Iverson of IGN ranked the cover of the comic book X-Men: Pixie Strikes Back #2 78th in their "Top 100 Comic Book Covers of 2010" list, writing, "Our picks for best cover of the year were chosen based on artistic quality, representation of the content within, entertainment value, and our editors' personal leanings."

== Other versions ==
=== "Age of X" ===
An alternate version of Megan Gwynn from Earth-11326 appears in "Age of X". She is known as Nightmare and possesses bat-like wings.

=== Ultimate Marvel ===
An alternate universe version of Pixie from Earth-1610 appears in the Ultimate Marvel universe. This version possesses rainbow wings and hair and innate teleportation abilities. The X-Men find Pixie and a group of survivors she managed to save in the ruins of Tian. A mutant named Amp, who can amplify others' powers, gives Pixie a boost and she attempts to teleport everyone back to Utopia, only to accidentally teleport them into a barren dimension filled with Gah Lak Tus drones. The X-Men and Rick Jones hold off the swarm until Pixie can recharge, but she is stabbed by a drone before she can teleport the group away.

=== "Secret Wars" ===
An alternate universe version of Pixie appears in the 2015–16 "Secret Wars" storyline. This version is a member of the Runaways, student at the Victor Von Doom Institute for Gifted Youths, and former lover of Jubilee.

== In other media ==
=== Television ===
- Pixie appears in Wolverine and the X-Men, voiced by Kate Higgins.
- Pixie makes non-speaking cameo appearances in X-Men '97.

=== Video games ===
- Pixie appears in X-Men: Destiny, voiced by Aileen Casas. This version is an associate of Caliban in rescuing mutants until she is captured and eventually killed by the Purifiers who seek to acquire her teleportation powers.
- Pixie appears as a playable character in Marvel Contest of Champions.
- Pixie appears as a playable character in Marvel Super War.
- Pixie appears as a playable character in Marvel Snap.

== See also ==
- List of fictional Welsh people
