= Ashley Allen =

American comics writer

- Born: Orono, Minnesota, U.S.
- Area: Writer
- Notable works: Magik

Ashley Allen is an American comic book writer who has written for Marvel and DC Comics. She has written Magik, Magik and Colossus, and Moonstar at Marvel.

== Early life and education ==
Allen is from Orono, Minnesota, and grew up with apraxia. She graduated from Macalester College in 2021. She is currently working on her MBA at the University of Virginia Darden School of Business.

== Career ==
Allen was a member of the inaugural class of the Milestone Initiative Program, which was announced in March 2022. As part of the program, she contributed a story to the one-shot New Talent Showcase: The Milestone Initiative in 2023. She also wrote a story for the anthology DC's Legion of Bloom.

In June 2023, she was announced as one of the writers for the first issue of Marvel Zombies: Black, White & Blood, her first story for Marvel. In February 2024, she was announced to be writing the one-shot comic X-Men: Blood Hunt -- Magik. This led, in September 2024, to the announcement that she would be writing a new Magik ongoing series with artist Germán Peralta. The book will feature a new villain designed by Peach Momoko. During New York Comic Con 2025, a new Magik & Colossus mini-series was announced that will be written by Allen, with the first issue to be released in February 2026. This will be part of the wider "Shadows of Tomorrow" wave of X-Men books. In November 2025, it was also announced that she would be writing Moonstar, a five-issue mini-series about Danielle Moonstar.

== Bibliography ==
=== DC Comics ===
- DC's I Know What You Did Last Crisis #1, short story "Dearly Departed" (2024)
- DC's Legion of Bloom #1, short story "Growing Pains" (2023)
- New Talent Showcase: The Milestone Initiative #1, short story "Third Wheel" (2023)

=== Marvel Comics ===
- Marvel Zombies: Black, White & Blood #1, short story "Deliverance" (2023)
- X-Men:
  - X-Men: Blood Hunt – Magik #1 (2024)
  - Magik vol. 2 #1-10 (2025)
  - Magik & Colossus #1-5 (2026)
  - Moonstar #1-5 (2026)
  - X-Men: Tomb of Apocalypse #1-5 (2026)
  - X-Orcists #1- (2026-present)
