= Belasco (Marvel Comics) =

- Belasco from New X-Men #37. Art by Niko Henrichon.

Publication information
- Publisher: Marvel Comics
- First appearance: Ka-Zar the Savage #11 (February 1982)
- Created by: Bruce Jones (writer); Brent Anderson (artist)

In-story information
- Full name: Belasco of the Corrupted
- Species: Demon
- Team affiliations: Demons of Limbo; Elder Gods
- Partnerships: Darkchylde; N'astirh; S'ym
- Notable aliases: Red King; Lucifer
- Abilities: Commands legion of demons; Skilled in magic; Invulnerability

Belasco is a supervillain appearing in American comic books published by Marvel Comics. Created by writer Bruce Jones and artist Brent Anderson, the character first appeared in Ka-Zar the Savage #11 (February 1982). Belasco is a demonic lord of Limbo. He is the former ruler of the Hell dimension. He is responsible for luring into the same hellish realm the superhero Illyana Rasputin / Magik.

== Publication history ==
Belasco debuted in Ka-Zar the Savage #11 (February 1982), and was created by Bruce Jones and Brent Anderson. He appeared in the 1983 Magik (Illyana and Storm) series, the 2021 X-Men: Curse of the Man-Thing one-shot, and the 2023 Mary Jane & Black Cat series.

== Fictional character biography ==
Belasco and Magik by Niko Henrichon

Belasco is alleged to have once been a sorcerer in 13th-century Florence, Italy who forged a pact with the Elder Gods that would allow them to cross the barrier to Earth. In exchange, Belasco was given immortality, mystical powers, and a demonic appearance. Intending to create a new race of demons, Belasco kidnapped Beatrice Portinari and fled with her to Mt. Flavius, where he would summon the Elder Gods. While en route, Belasco raped Beatrice. By the time they arrived at Mt. Flavius, Beatrice was due to give birth. However, she died in childbirth. Dante Alighieri, Beatrice's beloved, attacked Belasco. During the battle, Belasco was exposed to an unknown liquid that placed him in suspended animation.

In the present day, Belasco escapes his imprisonment after Mt. Flavius becomes active again. He finds a new sacrifice, Shanna O'Hara, and intends to finish what he had started by making her the mother of a demonic race. However, Shanna's mate Ka-Zar appears and hurls Belasco's locket into the volcano, sealing away the Elder Gods and apparently destroying Belasco. Rather than dying, Belasco is trapped in Limbo and spends years conquering it.

Belasco draws the young Illyana Rasputina to Limbo, intending to make her his disciple and use her to open a gateway for the Elder Gods. The X-Men follow to save Illyana. Due to the warping of space and time in Limbo, there are two alternate but equally valid outcomes to the rescue attempt. In one, the X-Men transport Illyana back to Earth, but are trapped in Limbo and killed by Belasco and his minions over the course of several decades. In the other, the X-Men escape to Earth, but fail to rescue Illyana. Belasco makes Illyana his apprentice in the dark arts and forcibly shapes part of her soul, giving her great potential for power and allowing him to hold sway over her. After receiving guidance from the remaining X-Men, Illyana rebels against Belasco, driving him from Limbo.

== Powers and abilities ==
Belasco is a sorcerer who can manipulate magic for a variety of effects, including the ability to fire bolts of mystical energy, create energy shields, transmute matter, travel across dimensions, control minds, and raise the dead. He was endowed by the Elder Gods with immortality and a degree of invulnerability. Additionally, he is a skilled swordsman and tactician and was seen wielding a battle axe with great skill.

== Other versions ==
=== Earth X ===
In the series Universe X, Belasco is Nightcrawler of the X-Men, who had become amnesiac and was displaced in time.

=== Ultimate Universe ===
An alternate universe version of Belasco appears in Ultimate Wolverine #15. This version was the ruler of Limbo until he was overthrown and killed by Magik.
