= Howl's Moving Castle (novel) =

1986 fantasy book by Diana Wynne Jones

- Front cover of first edition (US)
- Author: Diana Wynne Jones
- Cover artist: Joseph A. Smith
- Language: English
- Series: Howl's Castle
- Genre: Children's fantasy novel
- Publisher: Greenwillow Books (US), Methuen (November 1986)
- Publication date: April 1986
- Publication place: United Kingdom
- Media type: Print (hardcover)
- Pages: 212 pp (first edition)
- ISBN: 0-688-06233-4
- OCLC: 12582402
- LC Class: PZ7.J684 Hp 1986
- Followed by: Castle in the Air

Howl's Moving Castle is a fantasy novel by British author Diana Wynne Jones, first published in 1986 by Greenwillow Books of New York. It was a runner-up for the annual Boston Globe–Horn Book Award, and won the Phoenix Award twenty years later. It was adapted into a Studio Ghibli animated film of the same name in 2004, which was nominated for the Academy Award for Best Animated Feature.

Howl's Moving Castle is the first novel in the series of books called the Howl series. This series also includes Castle in the Air, published in 1990, and House of Many Ways, published in 2008. Howl's Moving Castle is the author's work most widely held in Worldcat participating libraries, followed by its first sequel Castle in the Air.

For the idea Jones "very much" thanked a boy in a school she was visiting, whose name she had noted but lost and forgot. He asked her to write a book titled The Moving Castle.

== Plot summary ==
Eighteen-year-old Sophie Hatter is the eldest of three sisters living in Market Chipping, a town in the magical kingdom of Ingary, where fairytale tropes are accepted ways of life, including that the eldest of three will never be successful. As the eldest, Sophie is resigned to a dull future running the family hat shop. Unbeknownst to her, she is able to talk life into objects. When the powerful Witch of the Waste considers her a threat and turns her into a crone, Sophie leaves the shop and finds work as a cleaning lady for the notorious wizard Howl. She strikes a bargain with Howl's fire demon, Calcifer: if she can break the contract between Howl and Calcifer, then he will return Sophie to her original youthful form. Part of the contract, however, stipulates that neither Howl nor Calcifer can disclose the main clause, leaving Sophie to figure it out on her own.

Sophie learns that Howl, a rather self-absorbed and fickle but ultimately good-natured person, spreads malicious rumours about himself to avoid work and responsibility. The door to his castle is actually a portal that opens onto four places: Market Chipping, the seaside city of Porthaven, the royal capital of Kingsbury, and Howl's boyhood home in modern day Wales where he was named Howell Jenkins. Howl's apprentice Michael Fisher runs most of the day-to-day affairs of Howl's business, while Howl chases his ever-changing paramours.

When Prince Justin, the King's younger brother, goes missing while searching for Wizard Suliman, the King orders Howl to find them both and kill the Witch of the Waste. Howl has his own reasons to avoid the Witch; this jilted former lover has laid a dark curse on him. He successfully continues to avoid her until she lures Sophie into a trap; believing the Witch has taken Howl's current love interest, Miss Angorian, Sophie has gone to save her and been captured by the Witch.

Howl spends hours in the bathroom every day primping himself to look handsome for girls; Michael had said that the day he does not do this is the day Michael will believe that Howl is truly in love. When Howl comes to save Sophie, unshaven and a mess, it demonstrates his love for her. He kills the Witch and reveals that Miss Angorian was actually the Witch's fire demon in disguise; the fire demon had taken control of the Witch and was attempting to create a "perfect human" by fusing Wizard Suliman and Prince Justin. It was to be completed by the addition of Howl's head.

At the castle, Miss Angorian takes hold of Calcifer to capture Howl's heart. Howl had given his heart to Calcifer. This was the contract between them; the heart kept Calcifer alive and in return Calcifer put his magic at Howl's disposal. Sophie uses her ability of bringing things to life to free Calcifer, thus breaking the contract between him and Howl. With his heart restored Howl destroys the witch's fire demon, freeing Suliman and Justin. Calcifer, as promised, breaks Sophie's spell and she returns to her proper age. Howl had realized early on that Sophie was under a spell and secretly attempted to remove the curse; when he had met with failure, he concluded that Sophie simply enjoyed "being in disguise".

Calcifer returns, preferring to stay with Howl. Sophie and Howl admit they love each other when Howl suggests they live happily ever after.

== Setting ==
=== Ingary ===
Most of the novel is set in a fictional monarchy, Ingary, whose capital is Kingsbury. Much of south-eastern Ingary is harsh wilderness referred to as "The Waste". Ingary is bordered by Strangia to the east and the Sultanates of Rashpuht to the south. Nearby is the country of High Norland; in the middle of the novel, the King of Ingary mentions that Ingary will likely be attacked by both Strangia and High Norland soon.

Before the move, the castle wanders over the hills between Market Chipping and Upper Folding in the north. Howl's house is in fact based in a seaside town named Porthaven; Howl also occupies a disguised stable in Kingsbury. Chapter eleven takes place in Wales. After the move, the castle sits at the edge of the Waste and Howl's house is moved to Sophie's childhood home in Market Chipping; they also occupy a grand but derelict mansion in Vale End (which is in the same valley as Market Chipping).

== Characters ==
=== Sophie Hatter ===
Sophie Hatter, the eldest of the Hatter sisters (18), has red hair and is rather pretty, though she doesn't perceive herself as such. She becomes more lovely as her confidence grows. While her siblings' lives become adventurous and exciting, she finds herself resigned to run her father's old hat shop, as it is her "fate" as the oldest sister. One day the Witch of the Waste, mistaking Sophie for Lettie, turns her into an old woman. Sophie leaves the shop and becomes a cleaning lady in Howl's castle, hoping that he might be able to lift the curse placed on her by the Witch. As the story progresses, she starts to fall in love with Howl, though she does her best to deny it. When Howl begins "courting" Miss Angorian, Sophie is hurt by this.

Though Sophie is initially reserved and lacking confidence, she demonstrates herself to be a strong-minded individual after she is transformed into an old woman, becoming less afraid of what others think of her. Dutiful, kind, and considerate, Sophie also has a tendency to be impulsive in her actions and often feels guilty when she does something wrong, though her attempts to rectify matters are usually disastrous. She can be temperamental and argumentative. She possesses some magic of her own – she is capable of imbuing magic into items by simply talking to them, though she initially is unaware of her abilities.

=== Wizard Howl ===
Wizard Howl (27) is a mysterious, reclusive wizard, with a terrible reputation. He is known by a number of aliases; by birth, he is Howell Jenkins, but he goes by "Wizard Jenkins" in Porthaven and his preferred "Howl Pendragon" in Kingsbury. When Howl was young, he gave Calcifer his heart in order for the fire demon to continue living because he felt sorry for him; this is implied to have sapped his humanity somewhat, and will continue to do so till he ends up like the Witch of the Waste. He is 27 (he states that he will soon be 10,000 days old, which is part of the Witch's curse) and known for being "wicked". He comes from Wales, a country unknown to most in the book, where his family remains unaware of his activities in Sophie's world or of its existence; his sister is annoyed by his disappearances, but he often visits them when troubled. He confesses to Sophie that he is a real coward and the only way he can get himself to do something he doesn't want to is to tell himself that he won't do it.

Despite his reputation, Howl is in reality an endearing, charming man who is intelligent, considerate, if somewhat self-appreciative, dishonest, and careless at times. He enjoys "slithering out" of uncomfortable situations, often in comical ways. Despite his cowardice, he is an incredibly powerful wizard, capable of matching the Witch of the Waste and is only not known as such because he wants to avoid the work that comes with the respect. His bond with Calcifer increases his powers.

Howl is tall and suave, fond of both dyeing his hair and wearing impressive suits. He spends at least two hours in the bathroom every morning. He is described by Calcifer as "vain for a plain man with mud-coloured hair". His vanity causes him to throw hysterical fits when Sophie meddles with his clothes or potions. Howl is not naturally handsome, but has "charm", both literally and figuratively. He is modelled on the Byronic hero.

=== Calcifer ===
Calcifer is Howl's resident fire-demon. As the result of a mysterious bargain with Howl some years ago, he agrees to heat and power the castle. Although he is bound to the hearth, he has a great amount of magic. He promises to use his magic to break the curse on Sophie, providing she breaks the contract between him and Howl. Howl describes Calcifer as "his weakest point", because Calcifer wouldn't give away another demon if it entered the castle, even if it had hostile intentions, although Howl's statement is true in more ways than one.

Calcifer is powerful, but can be just as cowardly as Howl, preferring to run from the Witch rather than fight her, but also like Howl, will fight when the need arises. He is also fairly crabby and a little mean-spirited, which stems from being bound to the hearth in the moving castle for over five years. He has a natural fear of water, and also worries quite frequently about running out of logs, which are essentially his food. Sophie seems to be the only one capable of forcing him to do anything he doesn't want to do, a trait she also extends to Howl, and to a lesser extent, Michael as well.

He is also the first one to recognise Sophie's incredible ability to talk life into the world around her, which is the reason he allowed her into the castle in the first place and was so eager to make a bargain with her – if anyone but she were to break the contract he had with Howl, then Calcifer would die. Fortunately, she is able to talk life into him, and he survives losing Howl's heart, even deciding to continue living with them after he is freed. Despite his misgivings, Calcifer is the most perceptive and intelligent character in the Castle, repeatedly dropping clever hints regarding Howl being "heartless" (which he uses in literal and figurative meanings), and not hesitating to give clues on Howl's capricious nature.

Calcifer's appearance is described as having a thin blue face, a thin blue nose, curly green flames for hair and eyebrows, a purple flaming mouth, and savage teeth. His eyes are described as orange flames with purple pupils. He does not have any evident lower body.

=== Michael Fisher ===
Michael Fisher is Howl's 15-year-old apprentice. He originally lived in Porthaven until both his parents died, leaving him an orphan. He had to leave his house because he couldn't pay the rent and slept on Howl's doorstep. Howl found him there one morning and told him to stay inside whilst he went out. Michael started talking to Calcifer and he believes that Howl was impressed with this when he returned. Howl did not tell him to stay but he also never told him to leave, so Michael started helping out of his own accord. He eventually became Howl's apprentice, and he does his best to make sure that Howl doesn't spend all their money. He often goes to Cesari's, a bakery in Market Chipping, where he buys pies and other baked goods. He met Martha there and fell in love with her. Sophie later realises that she saw Michael at Cesari's on May Day before she was cursed by the Witch of the Waste. He is described by Sophie as "a nice boy, but a bit helpless in a crisis". He is rather nice and patient but isn't quite as fast-thinking as Howl, therefore making Mrs. Penstemmon say he was "not clever enough to cause her concern".

=== The Witch of the Waste ===
The Witch of the Waste is one of the most powerful magicians in all of Ingary. She was banished by the late King to The Waste fifty years before the story starts for causing havoc in the country. She and Howl had a brief relationship (while she was disguised as a beautiful young woman) which led to him leaving her hurriedly. Angered by this, the Witch cursed Howl, so that after a sequence of unlikely events he would have to return to the Witch. She also puts a spell on Sophie at the start of the story, turning her into an old crone. The Witch is also revealed to have made a supposedly perfect man out of the combined parts of Wizard Suliman and Prince Justin, intending to complete the body with Howl's head and make the man King of Ingary and herself queen. She is killed by Howl at the end of the book.

=== Other characters ===
- Lettie Hatter is Sophie's seventeen-year-old sister. She is considered the most beautiful of the three Hatter sisters, and has dark hair and blue eyes. Initially, she is an apprentice at Cesari's, a pastry shop in Market Chipping, but because she wishes to learn magic, she and Martha switch places using a temporary appearance altering spell. A strong minded young woman, Lettie becomes fond of a stray dog which is in fact a bespelled Wizard Suliman. When she finds out Sophie has been bespelled and lives in Howl's castle, she sends the dog to protect Sophie from Howl's charm. Howl tries to woo Lettie, but upon discovering that Lettie is the bespelled Sophie's sister, he begins approaching Lettie to ask questions about Sophie instead. At the end of the novel, she is taken as an apprentice by Ben Sullivan, where a romantic attachment is hinted.
- Martha Hatter is Sophie's youngest sister and thought of as the smartest of the three. She is slender and fair with big grey eyes. Fanny arranges her to become Mrs Fairfax's apprentice, though Martha and Lettie switch appearances temporarily to switch places. Martha happily works as an apprentice at Cesari's, a renowned pastry shop, and her ambition is to get married and have ten children. She loves Michael Fisher. When Howl laments that he loves Lettie Hatter, Michael hurries to Cesari's to learn if Martha, still disguised as Lettie, has been courted by Howl. Martha assures him she has never met Howl and Michael knows she isn't lying because she 'twiddled her thumbs the whole time', and she only stops doing that when she lies.
- Fanny Hatter is Mr Hatter's second wife. She used to be the youngest, prettiest shop assistant in the hat shop. She is Martha's mother and is kind to all three girls. When she is widowed, she takes charge of the hat shop and places Lettie and Martha in promising apprenticeships, whilst keeping Sophie to trim hats. Shortly after Sophie disappears, she marries a wealthy man, Mr Sacheverell Smith (possibly thanks to a hat Sophie charmed), moves to a grand mansion in Vale End and sells the hat shop to Howl. She continues to worry about Sophie, who mysteriously disappeared, and is relieved and happy when they meet again.
- The King of Ingary employs Howl to produce transport spells. When the Witch of the Waste threatens his baby daughter Valeria, he sends Suliman the Royal Wizard to the Waste to deal with the Witch. When the King's brother disappears whilst looking for Wizard Suliman, he asks Howl to look for the missing men and get rid of the Witch of the Waste. He then appoints Howl as the Royal Wizard, a move which creates a bad mood in the household of the moving castle.
- Prince Justin is the younger brother of the King of Ingary. Unsettled by Suliman's disappearance, he sets off to find him only to go missing himself. The King of Ingary describes Justin as a brilliant general; with threats of war looming from both Strangia and High Norland, the King of Ingary becomes anxious and insists that Prince Justin must be found.
- Mrs Penstemmon is a grand, talented old witch. She taught Mrs Fairfax, Suliman, and finally Howl; she is also mentioned as the teacher of Matilda, the Witch of Montalbino, in House of Many Ways. She is proud of Howl's talent and wants him to be a good person but she is concerned he is heading the same way as the Witch of the Waste. When Sophie visits her while pretending to be Howl's mother, Mrs Penstemmon encourages Sophie to break the contract between Howl and Calcifer. She detects Sophie's magical gift and sees instantly that she's cursed, but cannot lift the Witch's spell. She is killed by the Witch of the Waste when she refuses to tell the Witch where Howl is.
- Wizard Suliman is the Royal Wizard and personal advisor to the King of Ingary. He originally comes, like Howl, from Wales, where he was known as Benjamin Sullivan. He was Mrs Penstemmon's second-to-last pupil. When the Witch threatens the King of Ingary's young daughter, he is dispatched to the Waste by the King. There he starts growing bushes and flowers in an attempt to reduce her power, but the Witch catches him. He projects most of his magic onto a scarecrow, which Sophie will talk life into. The Witch puts him to pieces and sells off his skull and guitar. She reassembles his body with parts of Prince Justin's (the head in particular) and calls him Gaston. She uses him to find out about Wales to get to Howl, then casts a spell on him that turns him into a dog. Calcifer guesses that one of his aliases is Percival. He takes on Lettie as an apprentice, because he is at least as strong-willed as she is.
- Mrs Annabel Fairfax is a witch and a former pupil of Mrs Penstemmon's. A widow, she lives in Upper Folding and is a friend of Fanny's. She is "a plump, comfortable lady, with swathes of butter-coloured hair". She is chatty and uses home-made honey in her spells. She discovers quickly that Martha and Lettie have switched places, but accepts Lettie as her apprentice anyway and encourages her to accept Howl's advances and become his pupil, though Lettie eventually chooses Suliman instead. Though she tries, she is unable to lift the curse placed on Percival.
- Lily Angorian is an attractive schoolteacher in Wales who claims to be Benjamin Sullivan's fiancée. As such, she refuses to allow Howl to court her, though Sophie comes to believe that Howl is infatuated with her. She is later revealed to be the Witch of the Waste's fire demon, and tries to take Howl's heart when the Witch of the Waste is killed. With the destruction of the Witch's heart, she is killed.
- Percival is the witch's footman in the beginning, constructed from Suliman and Justin, though she calls him "Gaston", but she later curses him to be a dog. For this reason, he is called "dog-man" before his name is revealed. He can briefly turn into a man, but can barely get a few sentences out before turning back into a dog, though always a different breed than he was before. In human form he is a nervous red-headed man with a crinkled brown suit. He, for a brief time, was with Lettie and Mrs. Fairfax before being sent to Sophie. When he and Lettie meet later, they seem to get along swimmingly.

== Major themes and genre ==
Howl's Moving Castle explores several themes, such as destiny, youth, courage and love. The first two are central to Sophie's progression. Early on, her perceived notion of destiny makes her believe that she is doomed to fail because she is the eldest of three sisters. This is in contrast to Howl, who sees himself as the master of his own fate, unafraid of what society thinks of him or what their conventions demand. Sophie's self-perceived failure is reflected in the Witch of the Waste's spell, which causes her outward appearance to become old and dull.

=== New Mythology ===
Many scholars have referred to Howl's Moving Castle as New Mythology. New Mythology is largely defined by the emergence of a new heroic archetype that transcends old cultural contexts and confronts them with modern ideals. Proponents of classifying Howl's Moving Castle as New Mythology present Sophie Hatter as one such heroine who follows this archetype. While Howl's Moving Castle builds on its predecessor myths such as Cupid and Psyche, Cinderella, Bluebeard, and Beauty and the Beast, it often subverts many of the tropes within them. For example, in the first few lines of the novel, Jones situates Sophie's position in mythology as being born the eldest of three and doomed to "fail first". This contrasts with the sisters of Cupid and Psyche, Cinderella, and Beauty and the Beast, where the youngest prevails in each tale. An additional characteristic of New Mythology that is also present in Howl's Moving Castle is its proximity to the real world. Jones often depicts this by using feelings of heterotopia as a feature within her stories. One such example is the door in the castle that opens to what is eventually recognized as Wales. This allows characters within the story to view our world from an outsiders perspective.

=== Inversion of the crone archetype ===
Traditionally, the binary typology of the characters in fairy tales is strictly based on representations of good and evil. In Howl's Moving Castle, both Howl and Sophie's distinction between being good or evil is often blurred. This is exemplified in Jones reversing the roles of 'Beauty' and 'Beast' within the novel by depicting Howl as young and handsome, while having Sophie be cursed and transformed into a crone. Representations of the witch or crone in western European mythology have been stereotypically negative as they are often depicted as ugly and malevolent. Sophie at one point in the story is even misidentified as villain, The Witch of the Waste. In having Sophie take on the role of a crone, she is freed from several traditional myth archetypes such as maiden, wife, or mother. Many moments in the novel highlight Sophie's newfound freedom in old age. One such example noting she would have been "shriveled with embarrassment" at her actions if she were still a young girl. Rather, it is the loss of her girlhood that empowers Sophie to recover her own agency and start her heroine's journey. Unlike stories of the past, Howl's Moving Castle presents the role of witch/crone in a heroic light. Though Sophie breaks her curse and returns to normal, she retains the power and insight she has gained throughout the story.

== Allusions and references to other works ==
The novel makes references to many other works of literature.

John Donne is alluded to twice, first in Chapter 10 when Howl refers to the first line of John Donne's poem The Sun Rising, saying "Busy old fool, unruly Sophie". Howl makes a reference to Donne again in Chapter 11, when Miss Angorian reads from his poem Song: "Go and catch a falling star". The poem also serves as the inspiration for the terms of Howl's curse, and is even referenced by name in the novel.

In Chapter 11 there is a sign on Megan's house labelled "Rivendell", the "Last Homely House" in J. R. R. Tolkien's The Lord of the Rings. In Chapter 12 there is a reference to Alice's Adventures in Wonderland when Howl tells Sophie "We can't all be Mad Hatters". Howl refers to Hamlet in Chapter 17 when he quotes "Alas, poor Yorick!" and "She heard mermaids, so it follows that something is rotten in the state of Denmark. I have an everlasting cold, but luckily I'm terribly dishonest. I cling to that"; another Hamlet reference occurs at the beginning of Chapter 11 referring to the nothingness in the doorway to Wales as being "only an inch-thick after all".

The names of Suliman's alias Percival, and Howl's brother-in-law Gareth are two of the Knights of the Round Table, while Howl's own alias, Pendragon, is derived from King Arthur's father, King Uther's epithet. The Witch of the Waste's name is a possible pun on the Witch of the West from the novel The Wonderful Wizard of Oz and its subsequent film.

A traditional Welsh folk song, Sosban Fach, is referred several times in the novel as "Calcifer's silly saucepan song".

== Adaptations ==
=== Film ===
The novel was adapted into a 2004 animated film, written and directed by Hayao Miyazaki and produced by Studio Ghibli. The film was critically acclaimed, broke box office records in Japan, and was nominated for the Academy Award for Best Animated Feature.

=== Radio ===
Robert Valentine wrote an adaptation for Bafflegab and BBC Radio 4, which broadcast on 12 December 2021. It starred Julia McKenzie and Dakota Blue Richards as the old and young Sophies respectively, Iwan Rheon as Howl, Angus Imrie as Michael Fisher, and Dan Starkey as Calcifer.

=== Stage ===
- A theatrical adaptation of the novel premiered in London at the Southwark Playhouse from 28th November 2011 to 7 January 2012, and received mixed reviews. It was adapted by Mike Sizemore and was directed by Davy and Kirsten McGuire. It was narrated by Stephen Fry and starred Daniel Ings as Howl.
- A musical adaptation of the novel premiered in Seattle in 2017. Similarly to its 2011 predecessor, it received mixed reviews, praising its production values and charm but with much criticism dedicated to its convoluted narrative, its runtime, forgettable melodies and lack of intricate special effects.
- A German-language stage adaptation entitled Sophie im Schloss des Zauberers premiered in Dresden in 2018, adapted by Katrin Breschke and Mina Salehpour, and starring Ursula Hobmair as Sophie, David Kosel as Howl and Denis Geyersbach as Calcifer.

== Reception ==
Wendy Graham reviewed Howl's Moving Castle for Adventurer magazine and stated that "As with most of Diana Wynne Jones' fiction, it's far too good for kids. She is quite simply the best at what she does."

=== Awards and nominations ===
In 1986 Howl's Moving Castle was one of two runners-up for the annual Boston Globe–Horn Book Award in Fiction, behind In Summer Light by Zibby Oneal. It was also named one of that year's ALA Notable Books for Children.

Jones and Howl won the annual Phoenix Award from the Children's Literature Association in 2006. The award recognises the best children's book published twenty years earlier that did not win a major award at the time; named for the mythical bird phoenix, which is reborn from its ashes, suggesting the winning book's rise from obscurity.

== See also ==
- List of fictional Welsh people
