= Erica Schultz =

American comic book writer, letterer, and editor

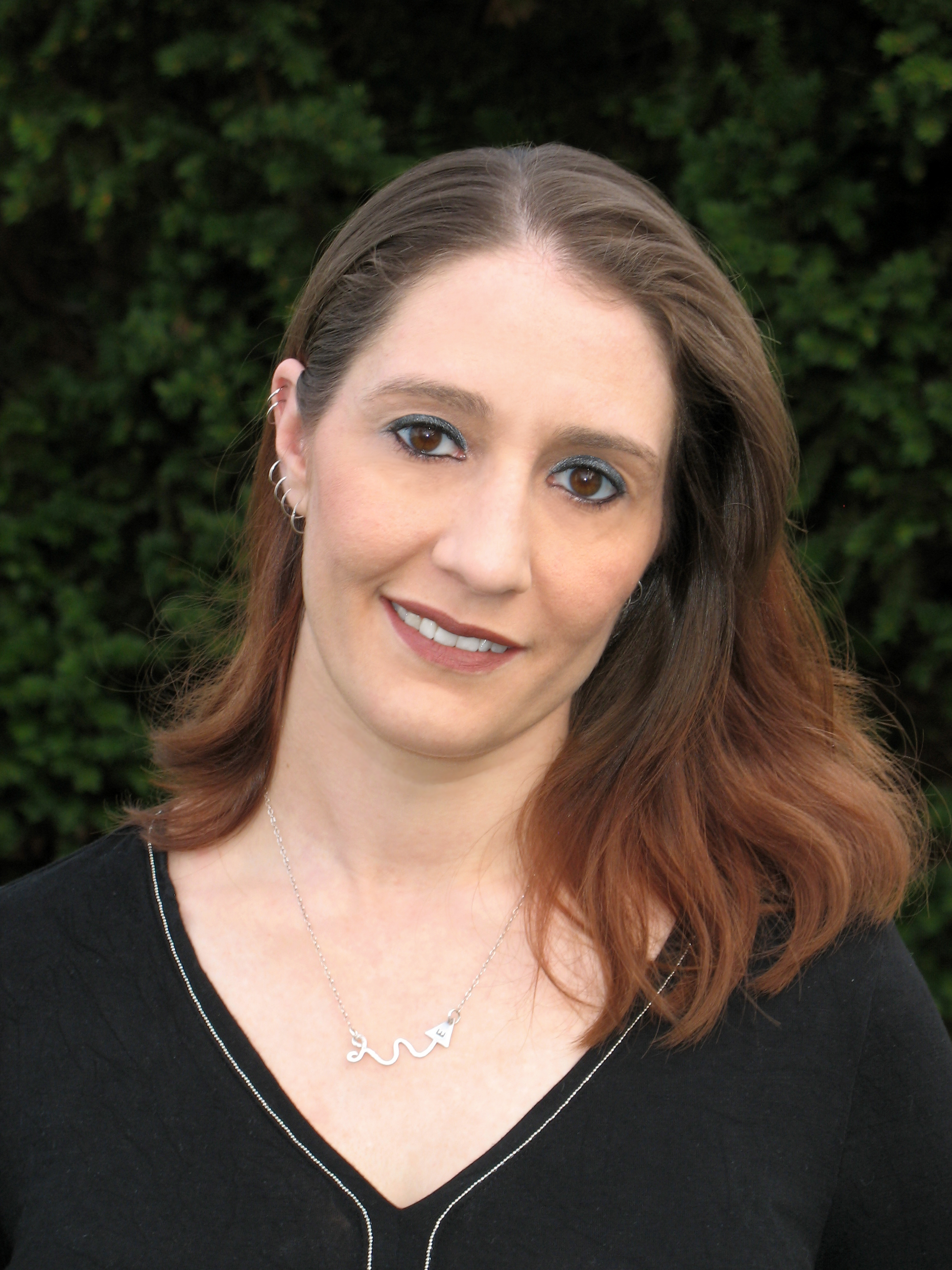
- Schultz in 2019
- Born: June 29, 1977 (age 49)
- Occupations: Comic book writer, letterer, and editor

Erica Schultz (born June 29, 1977) is an Inkpot Award winning, American comic book writer, letterer, and editor. She is the first woman to write a Spawn comic, and is best known for her writing work at Marvel on titles like Daredevil, X-23, and Hallows' Eve.

== Career ==
=== Art and design ===
Schultz worked as an art director at an advertising agency in New York City, and then started working at Neal Adams' Continuity Studios. Originally she was an animator on Marvel Comics's Astonishing X-Men motion comic, but continued doing art and design work, including inking and coloring on books such as Batman: Odyssey, The First X-Men, The Coming of the Supermen, and Blood.

Schultz has also served as a letterer on multiple comic books, including Neal Adams' "Batman Zombie" in DC's Batman: Black and White #1, Alan Moore's "Big Nemo" and Garth Ennis' "Red Horse" for Electricomics, and she lettered the entire Swords of Sorrow series. Schultz lettered Dynamite's Red Sonja, Dejah Thoris, and Vampirella titles in 2016. In April 2019, Schultz was announced as lettering instructor for Comics Experience.

=== Writing ===
In 2010/2011, Schultz co-created the Vices Press crime series M3, with Vicente Alcázar. It won the 2012 award for Best Comic Book at the Burbank International Film Festival.

In 2014, Schultz scripted Revenge: The Secret Origin of Emily Thorne, Marvel's Original Graphic Novel based on ABC's Revenge, in collaboration with TV series writer Ted Sullivan. In 2015, Schultz was chosen by Gail Simone as one of the many female writers to be involved with Dynamite Entertainment's Swords of Sorrow crossover series. Schultz wrote the Swords of Sorrow: Black Sparrow & Lady Zorro One-Shot and also co-wrote the Swords of Sorrow: Masquerade & Kato One-Shot with G. Willow Wilson. Schultz also wrote a story titled "Pop Goes the World" for the Vertigo Comics anthology Vertigo Quarterly: SFX #1.

In 2016, Schultz participated in the first DC Writers Workshop class taught by Scott Snyder. She was also published in DC Comics' New Talent Showcase #1 for her Hawkgirl story with artist Sonny Liew. In December 2016, Dynamite Entertainment announced Schultz, along with artist Maria Sanapo, would be relaunching the Charmed comic book series, based on the television show that ran from 1998 to 2006. In addition to the release of Schultz's Charmed: A Thousand Deaths in 2017, she was a contributing writer to Space Between Entertainment's Destiny, NY Volume 2.

In March 2018, Schultz was announced as a contributor to Image Comics' Where We Live Las Vegas Shooting Benefit Anthology, and in April, Action Lab Comics announced that Schultz's Twelve Devils Dancing comic series with artist Dave Acosta would premiere under their Action Lab/Danger Zone imprint. In May 2018, Schultz was announced as the new writer for Dynamite Entertainment's Xena: Warrior Princess beginning with issue #6 and as the writer for Marvel's 2018 Daredevil Annual.

In August 2019, Schultz was announced as a writing and storytelling teacher for the Kubert School. Schultz's story, "Future Shocks: The Switch" was included in 2000 AD Prog 2145, published in August 2019. In October, ComiXology announced Schultz's mini-series Forgotten Home would be exclusive to the platform's ComiXology Originals digital comic books. Forgotten Home has since gone on to be nominated for five 2020 Ringo Awards including Best Writer (Schultz), Best Inker (Marika Cresta), Best Cover Artist (Natasha Alterici), Best Letterer (Cardinal Rae), and Best Series.

In February 2020, Schultz was announced as an editor for Mad Cave Studios. In May 2021, Schultz launched a Kickstarter campaign to fund an original graphic novel titled The Deadliest Bouquet. Near the end of 2021, Aftershock Comics announced a new series for 2022 titled Bylines in Blood co-written by Schultz and Van Jensen. Then in December 2021, Marvel provided a free digital comic book in collaboration with Citizen titled The Power of Light written by Schultz.

In May 2022, Image Comics announced that The Deadliest Bouquet would be re-released as monthly issues published by Image in August. In July, Marvel Comics released Moon Knight Black, White & Blood #3 featuring Schultz's short story "Wrong Turn" focused on Jake Lockley, illustrated by artist David Lopez. This issue was nominated for a 2023 Eisner Award for Best Single Issue. During the 2022 New York Comic Con, Marvel revealed that Schultz would write a five-issue miniseries, X-23: Deadly Regenesis as well as a new miniseries called Hallows' Eve, with both comic books to release in March 2023.

In April 2023, Marvel revealed that Schultz would write What If...? Dark: Moon Knight #1 with art by Edgar Salazar to be released in August of that year. Then in May 2023, Marvel announced that Schultz would write Amazing Spider-Man Annual #1 also coming in August 2023, with art by Julian Shaw. Also in May, Schultz, along with other colleagues, received a 2023 Will Eisner Comic Industry Award nomination for their comic book Moon Knight Black, White & Blood #3 in the category of Best Single Issue/One Shot. In the latter half of 2023, Mad Cave Studios released Jennie Wood and Dozerdraws' graphic novel Paper Planes under their Maverick imprint, edited by Schultz. In the fall of 2023, Schultz was revealed to be the writer of Daredevil: Gang War as part of the larger, Amazing Spider-Man crossover event. At NYCC 2023, the Todd McFarlane panel announced that Schultz would be the first woman to write a Spawn book in the history of the franchise. The new series Rat City with artist Zé Carlos would launch in Spring 2024.

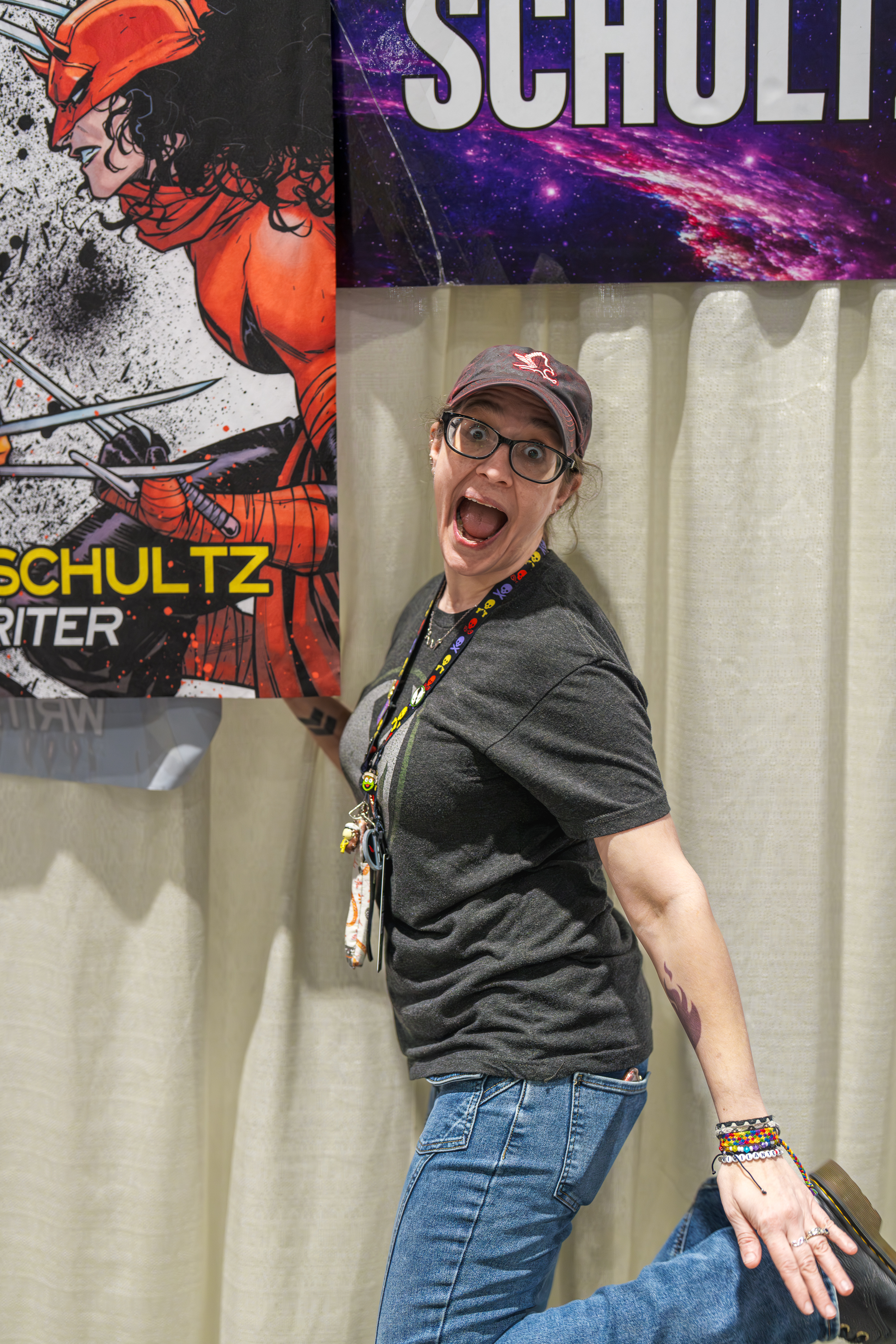
Schultz clowning around at GalaxyCon Richmond in 2026

At SDCC 2024, Marvel announced that a solo ongoing series focusing on Laura Kinney will be spun out of events of NYX (vol. 2). Schultz, with artist Giada Belviso, returned to write Laura Kinney: Wolverine, which began publication in December 2024.

In 2025, Marvel released Schultz's Daredevil: Unleash Hell as part of the Red Band line of poly bagged comics, with artist Valentina Pinti. In July, Schultz was announced as writer on Marvel's Laura Kinney: Sabretooth, part of the "Age of Revelation" storyline. At the 2025 New York Comic Con, it was announced that Schultz would write a new Rogue miniseries launching in January 2026. In 2025, Schultz would be a recipient of the Inkpot Award at the annual San Diego Comic Con.

In early 2026, Todd McFarlane announced that Schultz would take over writing duties on Gunslinger Spawn beginning with issue #54.

In March 2026, it was announced that Schultz would contribute to X-Men: The Hellfire Murder, which released in July.

== Bibliography ==
Writing credits

- M3 (#1-#12) (Vices Press, 2011) - M3 #1 won Best Comic for the 2012 Burbank International Film Festival -
- Odyssey Presents: Valkyrie vs. Venus #1 (TidalWave Productions, 2012)
- Revenge: The Secret Origin of Emily Thorne (Marvel, 2014) - Co-writer with Ted Sullivan
- The Unauthorized Biography of Winston Churchill: A Documentary (Vices Press, 2014)
- Rise #2 "Brothers In Arms" (Northwest Press, 2015)
- Vertigo Quarterly: SFX #1 "Pop Goes The World" (Vertigo/DC, 2015)
- Swords of Sorrow: Masquerade & Kato (Dynamite Entertainment, 2015) - Co-writer with G. Willow Wilson
- Swords of Sorrow: Black Sparrow & Lady Zorro (Dynamite Entertainment, 2015)
- Cheese: A Love Story (Vices Press, 2015)
- The 27 Club: A Comics Anthology "A Seminal Vintage" (Action Lab Entertainment and Red Stylo Media, 2015) - Nominated for a 2016 Harvey Award for Best Anthology
- Swords of Sorrow: The Complete Saga TPB (Dynamite Entertainment, 2016)
- Aw Yeah Comic! #12 "Boss Appreciation Day" (Aw Yeah Comics! 2016)
- New Talent Showcase #1 "Hawkgirl: Weapons of War" (DC Comics, 2016)
- Charmed: A Thousand Deaths (#1-#5 & TPB) (Dynamite Entertainment, 2017)
- Where We Live: A Benefit for the Survivors in Las Vegas "Daddy's Little Girl" (Image Comics, 2018) - Winner for the 2019 Ringo Award for Best Anthology
- Oneshi Press Quarterly Anthology #4 "Heartbreaker" (Oneshi Press, 2018)
- Oneshi Press Quarterly Anthology #5 "Gabrielle" (Oneshi Press, 2018)
- Twelve Devils Dancing (#1-#6) (Action Lab Danger Zone, 2018)
- Xena: Warrior Princess Vol. 2 (Dynamite Entertainment, 2018)
- Daredevil Annual (Marvel, 2018)
- Corpus: A Comic Anthology of Bodily Ailments "This is How it Feels" (Corpus, 2018)
- Destiny, NY Vol. 2 "Sister, Sister" (Space Between Entertainment, 2018)
- This Nightmare Kills Fascists "Bishop Takes Rook; Knight Takes Pawn" (A Wave Blue World, 2018)
- Twelve Devils Dancing TPB (Action Lab Danger Zone, 2019)
- The Good Fight "Long Overdue" (Adam Ferris Productions, 2019)
- Marvel Universe: Time and Again TPB (Marvel, 2019)
- 2000 AD Prog 2145 "Future Shock: The Switch" (2000 AD, 2019)
- Bettie Page Halloween Special "War of the Worlds" (Dynamite Entertainment, 2019)
- Strange Tails (Vices Press, 2019) - Nominated for a 2020 Ringo Award for Best Anthology
- Forgotten Home (Vices Press, comiXology Originals, 2019) - Nominated for five 2020 Ringo Awards for Best Writer, Best Inker, Best Cover Artist, Best Letterer, and Best Series
- The Silver Spurs of Oz (Capstone Publishing, 2020)
- Aw Yeah Comics! #14 "All The World's A Stage" (Aw Yeah Comics! 2020)
- Maybe Someday "Ghost in the Apartment" (A Wave Blue World 2020) - Nominated for a 2021 Ringo Award for Best Anthology
- Legacy of Mandrake (Red 5 Comics, Stonebot Comics, King Features, 2020)
- The Deadliest Bouquet (Vices Press, 2021; Image Comics, 2022)
- The Power of Light (Marvel, 2021)
- Bylines In Blood (AfterShock, 2022) - Co-writer with Van Jensen
- Moon Knight: Black, White, and Blood (Marvel, 2022)
- X-23 DEADLY REGENESIS (Marvel, 2023)
- Hallows' Eve (Marvel, 2023)
- What If...? Dark: Moon Knight #1 (Marvel, 2023)
- Hallows' Eve The Big Night #1 (Marvel, 2023)
- Daredevil: Gang War (Marvel, 2023)
- Marvel Zombies: Black, White & Blood #2 (Marvel, 2023)
- Rat City (Image, 2024)
- Women of Marvel (Marvel, 2024
- Black Widow Venomous (Marvel, 2024)
- Venom War Venomous (Marvel, 2024)
- Daredevil Woman Without Fear (Marvel, 2024)
- Blood Hunters (Marvel, 2024)
- DARTH MAUL BLACK WHITE & RED #3 (Marvel, 2024)
- Spider-Man Black Suit & Blood #2 (Marvel, 2024)
- Phases of the Moon Knight #1 (Marvel, 2024)
- Laura Kinney: Wolverine (Marvel, 2024)
- Daredevil: Unleash Hell (Marvel, 2025)
- Web of Venomverse (Marvel, 2025)
- Laura Kinney: Sabretooth (Marvel, 2025)
- Rogue (2026) (Marvel, 2026)
- Gunslinger Spawn (Image, 2026)
