= Age of Revelation =

Comic book storyline

Publication information
- Publisher: Marvel Comics
- Genre: Superhero
- Publication date: October – December 2025
- Main character(s): X-Men (Note: The following were X-Men after establishment of Revelation Territories: Animalia, Archangel, Beast, Cyclops, Forge, Glob Herman, Magneto, Schwarzschild, and Xorn); Revelation

Creative team
- Written by: Jed MacKay
- Penciller(s): Ryan Stegman; Netho Diaz

"X-Men: Age of Revelation" is a 2025 comic book crossover storyline published in the X-Men franchise of books by Marvel Comics during the X-Men: From the Ashes publishing phase. The event involves a dark future and features a new mutant utopia led by Apocalypse's heir Doug Ramsey under his new name of Revelation. During the entirety of the event, the ongoing X-Men comics are replaced by a group of limited series, focusing on various teams and individuals in the alternate timeline.

"X-Men: Age of Revelation" begins with the one-shot X-Men: Age of Revelation Overture (October 2025) followed by the core title X-Men: Book of Revelation. The other flagship titles are Amazing X-Men (vol. 3) and Unbreakable X-Men.

== Publication history ==
In July 2025, Marvel Comics released a teaser for "X-Men: Age of Revelation", which would launch in October 2025. Marvel then announced that the Age of Revelation event will commemorate the 30th anniversary of "Age of Apocalypse" (1995) and begins with Age of Revelation Overture #1. The event is preceded by X-Men: Age of Revelation #0, a one-shot issue that was released in July 2025, written by Jed MacKay and illustrated by Humberto Ramos. MacKay is also credited as the "event architect" and will write the core title X-Men: Book of Revelation with artist Netho Diaz.

Set ten years in the future, X-Men: Age of Revelation focuses on a new mutant utopia led by Apocalypse's heir Revelation (Doug Ramsey); however the Revelation Territories were "built on a lie and threatens to overwhelm the earth and destroy humanity, leading a band of X-Men to foment rebellion". Several titles for the event were also announced in July 2025, including the flagship titles Amazing X-Men (vol. 3), written by MacKay with art by Mahmud Asrar, and Unbreakable X-Men, written by Gail Simone with art by Lucas Werneck. The following are all the titles in the event:

- Amazing X-Men — A team of X-Men leading the resistance against Revelation
- Binary — Features Carol Danvers wielding the power of the Phoenix following the death of Jean Grey
- Laura Kinney: Sabretooth — Featuring Laura Kinney taking the name of Sabretooth as Revelation's assassin
- Longshots — Featuring Bishop, Hellcat, Kraven the Hunter, Rhino and Wonder Man starring in a Mojoworld series
- World of Revelation — An anthology one-shot featuring Apocalypse and Professor X, Wiccan and Hulkling, and the fate of the Fantastic Four
- Iron & Frost — Centered around the Heartless Queen, the Iron King, and the Hellfire Club
- Rogue Storm — Revealing the fate of Storm and how Rogue was split into Rogue Green and Rogue Red
- Sinister's Six — An X-Force/Sinister Six-type team assembled by Mister Sinister
- Unbreakable X-Men — Featuring the X-Men of Haven House guarding the Penumbra
- Omega Kids — Featuring Quentin Quire and his students running a spy network
- Radioactive Spider-Man — Featuring Spider-Man transformed into a mutant in New York, which has been decimated by the X-Virus
- The Last Wolverine — Featuring Wendigo on a mission to uphold his mentor's legacy
- X-Men: Book of Revelation — Featuring the Revelation's operation in Philadelphia
- Cloak or Dagger — Featuring Cloak and Dagger, who are unable to exist on the same plane at the same time after being exposed to the X-Virus
- Expatriate X-Men — Featuring Ms. Marvel and her team in control of the Mississippi River waters that divide mutantkind from the rest of humanity
- Undeadpool — Transformed into a mutant, Deadpool has insatiable hunger for the life force of mutants
- X-Vengers — Featuring Dani Moonstar leading a new team of Avengers transformed into mutants
- X-Men: Age of Revelation Infinity Comic — An anthology limited series featuring Cable and Revelation, Magik's journey in Limbo, and Glob Herman's shift to his current combative personality and training under the Punisher.

ComicsXF explained that X-Men: Age of Revelation has a similar format to previous events such as "Age of X-Man" (2019) and "Sins of Sinister" (2023) where Marvel shuts "down a bunch of ongoing series" in order to relaunch "them with new names and concepts". ComicsXF also noted that Age of Revelation would keep X-Men: From the Ashes' writers (Note: These writers include Jed MacKay, Gail Simone, Eve Ewing, Stephanie Phillips, Erica Schultz, Saladin Ahmed, Murewa Ayodele and Jason Loo, and artist David Marquez writing Sinster's Six.) while also bringing back Krakoan Age writers such as Jonathan Hickman (former Head of X), Gerry Duggan, Al Ewing, and Steve Foxe.

X-Men: Age of Revelation ended in December 2025 in a Finale issue done by Jed MacKay and Ryan Stegman.

== Plot ==
=== Lead-up ===
When Apocalypse sought an heir to succeed him on Earth, Doug Ramsey was chosen and became Apocalypse's successor: Revelation. Doug discusses with Bei the Blood Moon and Warlock about his newly upgraded powers and his intention of not following in Apocalypse's footsteps. Doug, Bei, and Warlock are attacked by the black ops group Z.E.R.O. and head to Alaska after defeating them, deciding they could use some X-Men as allies.

Cyclops decides to put Doug, Bei and Warlock's membership to a vote. With a majority accepting, Cyclops is about to welcome Doug and his group into the X-Men when Cyclops' consciousness is swapped with his future counterpart.

=== Prelude ===
Ten years in the future, Apocalypse's heir Revelation establishes a tightly controlled mutant utopia after his X-Virus wiped out much of humanity while turning the survivors into mutants. As Revelation rules the newly formed Revelation Territories with militant factions like the Seraphim and the Omega Kids network. Anyone who opposes Revelation is punished by having all language removed from them, turning them into a Babel. With escalating oppression, a secret X-Men resistance (consisting of Jennifer Starkey / Animalia, Archangel, Beast, Cyclops, Forge, Glob Herman, Magneto, and Schwarzschild) emerges, with Xorn ultimately joining their cause.

=== Plot ===
==== Age of Revelation: Overture ====
Cyclops' consciousness is projected into his future body; he learns from Magneto that Revelation has altered the minds of Cyclops and Beast, replacing their future selves with their past consciousnesses. Revelation's wife Bei the Blood Moon is on the run while Revelation himself prepares his next move. Beast also arrives in the future, and Magneto reveals that Revelation unleashed the X-Virus that wiped out most of humanity. Revelation commands the release of the Angel of Death (a mind-controlled Wolverine) who kills Magneto, Forge, and Archangel. As Xorn sacrifices himself to create a black hole to stop Wolverine, Bei is mortally wounded by Kwannon, but manages to send a telepathic message to Mars for Apocalypse.

==== Amazing X-Men ====
With their teammates dead, Glob Herman tells Cyclops that they have to make sure Schwarzschild stays alive until they can get to an agent in Philadelphia. Elsewhere, Revelation and his Choristers Fabian Cortez, Khora of the Burning Heart, and Chance recover Wolverine. The X-Men arrive at the remains of Graymalkin Prison and are confronted by Deathdream. When the Angel of Death attacks, Cyclops teleports the X-Men away. The teleporter malfunctions and transports the X-Men to Providence, where they are confronted by Darkchild, Juggernaut, and Kwannon.

When Cyclops tries to persuade Darkchild to help them get to Philadelphia, she tells them that she will have a duel to determine if she will help them. If Darkchild wins, one of their own must stay with Magik. Cyclops manages to best her. Darkchild honors the deal as Kwannon defects to their side, claiming that Revelation is trying to end the world.

Psylocke states that she was hunting a traitor who leaked information to the X-Men, which led to the death of Topaz. Animalia states that what happened to Topaz was justified since the Choristers are legitimate targets. As Cyclops breaks up the argument, Psylocke states that the traitor she was after was Bei the Blood Moon, who stated that Revelation wanted to remake the world in his own image. The X-Men begin making their way towards Philadelphia. Meanwhile, in the "X-Mansion" below Philadelphia, Wiz Kid meets with the X-Men and learns what happened to Archangel, Magneto, and Xorn. Wiz Kid tells Cyclops that his plan is not going to work because Apocalypse has arrived in Philadelphia with Professor X.

==== X-Men: Book of Revelation ====
Revelation learns of the death of Topaz and announces it to his crown with the Choristers, inducting Elbecca into the group. The next morning, Death arrives carrying a message from Apocalypse stating that he has squandered his inheritance and prevented his purpose. Revelation is told to surrender the territories and face judgement on Arakko. When Revelation refuses, Death states that what he is doing is an abomination and states what happened to Bei. Using his Choristers, Revelation makes Death kneel and has him tell Apocalypse that he had abdicated his plans for Earth to him while sending him on his way. Later that evening, Cortez admits to Elbecca that he was just jealous of her and refuses to be replaced as he throws Elbecca off the building. Elbecca is rescued by the "Ghost of Philadelphia", Kitty Pryde.

Kitty states that she was rendered invisible and intangible by Revelation after opposing his actions. Elbecca accuses Cortez of trying to murder her and claims that he leaked information on Topaz's location to the X-Men. Cortez is intimidated to admit to Revelation as he makes him feel pain. Several days later, Elbecca kills Cortez by kicking him down multiple flights of stairs, making his death appear to be a suicide.

When Elbecca attacks him, Revelation intercepts her and figures out that she killed Cortez and that Apocalypse planted her into his ranks. Revelation pins Elbecca down and states that he plans to merge with Earth, absorbing everyone infected by the X-Virus into himself. Elbecca stabs Revelation, who retaliates and stabs her in turn. Elbecca reveals that she planted a Krakoan gateway at Cortez's grave, which Apocalypse uses to arrive on Earth.

=== Finale ===
Beneath Philadelphia, Animalia, Beast, Schwarzschild, and Wiz Kid work on a device that will get Cyclops and Beast back to the past and prevent Revelation from releasing the X-Virus. Despite the X-Men's efforts, Revelation activates his final attack and succeeds in fusing with the Earth. Before Revelation fully transforms, Beast and Cyclops return to their own time and Beast arranges to have data sent to the past to help the X-Men. Cyclops awakens in the Factory and finds a helmet preventing him from using his optic beams. The chairman of 3K reawakens, revealing him to be the original Beast. Beast had been sent to the future in place of his Krakoan duplicate and intends to use the data he gained from the future for his own benefit.

== Characters ==
Series	Characters	Ref
Amazing X-Men (vol. 3)	Animalia; Beast; Cyclops; Glob Herman; Schwarzschild	
Binary	Carol Danvers	
Laura Kinney: Sabretooth	Akihiro; Alex Kinney; Gabby Kinney; Sabretooth; Sage; Apocalypse	
Longshots	Mojo; Bishop; Wonder Man; Rhino; Hellcat; Kraven the Hunter	
Rogue Storm	Akujin; Fantomex; Gateway; Iceman; Rogue (Red); Storm; Warpath	
Iron & Frost	Emma Frost; Firestar; Iron Man; Marrow; War Machine; Landslide; Phasar	
Sinister's Six	Black Cat; Domino; Havok; Lady Fantomex; Mister Sinister; Omega Red; Venom	
Unbreakable X-Men	Dome; Gambit; Ransom; Rogue (Green); Sentinel Boy; Spider-Girl; Temper	
The Last Wolverine	Wonderful Wolverine/Wendigo/Leonard Two Bears; Kurt Wagner; Vindicator; Logan	
Omega Kids	Quentin Quire; Curtis Terrill Jr.; Nell Widows; Alya Bozkurt; Bailey Quinn	
Radioactive Spider-Man	Spider-Man; Cecilia Reyes; May Parker	
Cloak or Dagger	Cloak and Dagger	
Expatriate X-Men	Bronze; Melee; Ms. Marvel; Mystique; Rift; Lyrebird	
Undeadpool	Deadpool	
X-Men: Book of Revelation	Chance; Fabian Cortez; Khora of the Burning Heart; Revelation; Elbecca Voss; Kitty Pryde	
X-Vengers	Danielle Moonstar; Hawkeye; Vision; Variable Man; Water Widow; Cannonball; Shang-Chi	

== Issues involved ==
=== Event issues and main titles ===
Title	Issues	Writer	Artist	Colorist	Debut date	Conclusion date	Ref
X-Men: Age of Revelation #0 (Note: Prelude issue released before the start of the event.)	1	Jed MacKay	Humberto Ramos	Edgar Delgado	July 16, 2025		
X-Men: Age of Revelation Overture	#1	Jed MacKay	Ryan Stegman	TBA	October 1, 2025		
Amazing X-Men (vol. 3)	#1–3	Jed MacKay	Mahmud Asrar	TBA	October 8, 2025	December 3, 2025	
X-Men: Book of Revelation	#1–3	Jed MacKay	Netho Diaz	TBA	October 22, 2025	December 17, 2025	
X-Men: Age of Revelation Finale	#1	Jed MacKay	Ryan Stegman	TBA	December 31, 2025		

=== Other limited series ===
Title	Issues	Writer(s)	Artist	Colorist	Debut date	Conclusion date	Ref
Binary	#1–3	Stephanie Phillips	Giada Belviso	TBA	October 8, 2025	December 3, 2025	
Laura Kinney: Sabretooth	#1–3	Erica Schultz	Valentina Pinti	TBA	October 8, 2025	December 3, 2025	
Longshots	#1–3	Gerry Duggan; Jonathan Hickman	Alan Robinson	TBA	October 8, 2025	December 3, 2025	
World of Revelation	#1	Ryan North; Al Ewing; Steve Foxe	Adam Szalowski; Jesus Merino	TBA	October 8, 2025		
Rogue Storm	#1–3	Murewa Ayodele	Roland Boschi	TBA	October 15, 2025	December 10, 2025	
Iron & Frost	#1–3	Cavan Scott	Ruairí Coleman	TBA	October 15, 2025	December 10, 2025	
Sinister's Six	#1–3	David Marquez	Rafael Loureiro	TBA	October 15, 2025	December 10, 2025	
Unbreakable X-Men	#1–3	Gail Simone	Lucas Werneck	TBA	October 15, 2025	December 10, 2025	
The Last Wolverine	#1–3	Saladin Ahmed	Edgar Salazar	TBA	October 22, 2025	December 17, 2025	
Omega Kids	#1–3	Tony Fleecs	Andrés Genolet	TBA	October 22, 2025	December 17, 2025	
Radioactive Spider-Man	#1–3	Joe Kelly	Kev Walker	TBA	October 22, 2025	December 17, 2025	
Cloak or Dagger	#1–3	Justina Ireland	Lorenzo Tammetta	TBA	October 29, 2025	December 31, 2025	
Expatriate X-Men	#1–3	Eve. L Ewing	Francesco Mortarino	TBA	October 29, 2025	December 31, 2025	
Undeadpool	#1–3	Tim Seeley	Carlos Magno	TBA	October 29, 2025	December 31, 2025	
X-Vengers	#1–3	Jason Loo	Sergio Dávila	TBA	October 29, 2025	December 31, 2025	

=== Epilogue issue ===
Title	Issues	Writer(s)	Artist	Colorist	Debut date	Conclusion date	Ref
X-Men (Vol. 7)	#23-25	Jed MacKay	Tony S. Daniel		January 7, 2026	–	

== Reception ==
Ratings
Title	Issue	Comic Book Roundup
X-Men: Age of Revelation	#0	9/10
X-Men: Age of Revelation Overture	#1	8.3/10

According to David Brooke of AIPT Comics, X-Men: Age of Revelation Overture is a powerful, event-level beginning that redefines both the X-Men and the Marvel Universe. He praises Jed MacKay's writing for immediately pulling readers in, subverting expectations, and clearly revealing the true villain behind the chaos. Brooke compares the story to Age of Apocalypse, noting the thrill of seeing reimagined characters—such as Glob Herman (now a PTSD-affected soldier), and Magneto (whose purpose has shifted after X-Virus). He highlights how MacKay smartly introduces only a few characters from each side, keeping the story clear and focused, while exploring complex moral questions about freedom and control. Brooke also commends Ryan Stegman's "out of this world" art, supported by JP Mayer's inks and Edgar Delgado's colors, calling it some of Stegman's best work—dynamic, detailed, and emotionally charged, especially in the story's powerful closing moments.
