= Magik =

Marvel Comics superheroine

- Various incarnations of Illyana Rasputina/Magik as depicted on the variant textless cover of Magik vol. 2 #8 (August 2025). Art by Russell Dauterman.

Publication information
- Publisher: Marvel Comics
- First appearance: As Illyana Rasputina: Giant-Size X-Men #1 (May 1975); As Magik: Magik (Storm and Illyana) #1 (December 1983)
- Created by: Illyana Rasputina: Len Wein; Dave Cockrum; Magik: Chris Claremont; Sal Buscema

In-story information
- Alter ego: Illyana Nikolaievna Rasputina
- Species: Human mutant
- Team affiliations: Phoenix Five; New Mutants; Hellions; X-Men; Swordbearers of Krakoa
- Notable aliases: The Darkchilde; Archimage; Lightchilde
- Abilities: Stepping discs granting inter-dimensional teleportation and time-travel; Sorcery powers; Eldrich armor which deflects physical and magical attacks; Soulsword which disrupts magical energies, constructs, and creatures

Magik (Illyana Nikolaievna Rasputina; Russian: Ильяна Николаевна Распутина) is a superhero appearing in American comic books published by Marvel Comics. Created by writer Len Wein and artist Dave Cockrum, the character first appeared in the Giant-Size X-Men #1 (May 1975). Illyana Rasputina is a member of a fictional species of humanity known as mutants, who are born with superhuman abilities, and has also possessed magical abilities as well, as a result of her interactions with the demonic supervillain Belasco. Illyana Rasputina is the younger sister of the Russian X-Men member Colossus and X-Men enemy Mikhail Rasputin. She became a powerful sorceress due to her time imprisoned in (and later ruling) Limbo. Her mutant power, which first manifested in that Limbo, is the ability to teleport via stepping discs utilizing that dimension's magic. Following her escape from Limbo, she became part of the New Mutants. She later joined the X-Men. In 2024, Marvel debuted an ongoing series starring Magik, written by Ashley Allen with art by Germán Peralta.

The character has been featured in various Marvel-licensed products, including video games, animated television series, and merchandise. Anya Taylor-Joy portrayed Illyana Rasputina in the 2020 film The New Mutants.

== Publication history ==
Illyana Rasputina debuted in Giant-Size X-Men #1 (May 1975), created by Len Wein and Dave Cockrum. Her first name was not revealed until The Uncanny X-Men #145 (May 1981). For the first eight years of the character's existence, she was an infrequently appearing background character known as Colossus' little sister. The means of changing this was set in The Uncanny X-Men #160 (August 1982), in which she ages seven years while in a paranormal dimension called Limbo, becomes a sorceress, and develops the mutant ability to create "teleportation discs." These changes were not immediately explored or explained, and for the next year she remained essentially a background character.

In December 1983, the limited series Magik (Illyana and Storm) was launched, chronicling Illyana's years in Limbo, which is also her origin story. Magik #1 (December 1983) is her first cover appearance as young Illyana, her second full appearance and the first time she received the name Magik. Magik #2 (Jan. 1984) is her first cover appearance as an adult. Immediately following the end of the series, she was added to the cast of the New Mutants, appearing regularly in that comic from The New Mutants #14 (April 1984), the first cover appearance of adult Magik in costume, to The New Mutants #77 (July 1989), in which she returns to her family in Russia after having reverted to childhood. As the younger sister of Colossus and a member of the New Mutants, she also sporadically appeared as a guest star in Uncanny X-Men.

In The Uncanny X-Men #303 (1993), she dies of the Legacy Virus. Other than flashbacks and alternate realities, she was absent from regular publication for most of the 1990s, though she does appear as a time-traveler in The New Mutants: Truth or Death #1-3 (1997). After being resurrected by Belasco, she returned to regular publication in 2007, in New X-Men #38-41 (2007), X-Infernus #1-4 (2009), X-Men: Hellbound #1-3 (2010) and New Mutants vol. 3 #1-29 (2009-2011). As a member of Cyclops' Extinction Team, she appears in The Uncanny X-Men vol. 2 #1-20 (2012), Avengers vs. X-Men #1-12 (2012), AVX: Versus #3 (2012), and AVX: Consequences #1-5 (2012). She appears in All-New X-Men, The Uncanny X-Men vol. 3, Extraordinary X-Men, and The New Mutants: Dead Souls (2018), as a regular character. She appears in Strange Academy #1 (2020) as a teacher in Dr. Strange's Sorcerer School.

== Fictional character biography ==
=== Early life ===
Illyana Rasputina was born in the Ust-Ordynski Collective farm, near Lake Baikal, Siberia, Russian SFSR, Soviet Union to Nikolai Rasputin and his wife Alexandra Rasputina. The 2006 comic mini-series Colossus: Bloodline established that the family was descended from Grigori Rasputin and a Romani woman named Elena. Illyana's two older brothers, Mikhail Rasputin and Colossus (Piotr Rasputin) are also mutants. Colossus' superhuman powers manifest while saving Illyana from a runaway tractor.

At six years old, Illyana is abducted and brought to the United States by Arcade, who uses her and several other hostages to coerce the X-Men into opposing Doctor Doom. She is rescued and brought back to the X-Mansion.

A transformed Illyana becomes a powerful sorceress and ruler of Limbo in the first Magik limited series in 1983

=== Limbo ===
Shortly thereafter, Illyana is called to the Limbo dimension by Belasco, who seeks to bring forth the Elder Gods to rule Earth. She is raised there, frequently bullied and tormented by Belasco's underling S'ym. To free himself, Belasco needs to fill the Beatrix Medallion with five bloodstones. The bloodstones are created by corrupting Illyana's soul, with a new stone appearing as her corruption deepens. She is rescued and tutored in the practice of white magic by that dimension's version of Storm, who turned to magic when her mutant powers waned. Finding the use of magic abhorrent, Limbo's version of Shadowcat, known as Cat, kidnaps and trains Illyana in hand to hand and sword combat. Cat, along with Illyana, storms Belasco's citadel. They are overwhelmed by Belasco, who further transforms Cat into a demonic feline creature. With Illyana back under his control, Belasco instructs her in the art of black magic in the hopes that it will further corrupt her soul. However, Illyana plots Belasco's defeat and continues to resist the dark influence on her soul.

Belasco succeeds in creating three parts of Illyana's bloodstone pendant. Illyana creates the Soulsword and takes over Limbo as its new ruler. While wielding the Soulsword, she manifests horns, a tail and fangs. She banishes Belasco from Limbo and claims S'ym as her servant. She then returns to Earth a decade older, although no time has passed on Earth since her kidnapping. She subsequently joins the New Mutants.

A strange armor begins to appear on her body each time she wields the Soulsword. The armor appears only on one of her shoulders and arms at first, but appears on more of her body each time that she wields the sword. A routine trip through Limbo goes awry, leaving the New Mutants stuck in Limbo. To open an escape route for her teammates, Illyana embraces her demonic nature and opens a colossal teleportation disc between Earth and Limbo, which N'astirh uses to facilitate an invasion of Earth by demons from Limbo. Ashamed of herself, Magik flees into Limbo and decides to end the demonic invasion by assuming rule of Limbo. However, her teammate Rahne Sinclair persuades her against this, and she instead gives up her demonic powers by creating a massive stepping disc that banishes the demons back to Limbo. Afterwards, the New Mutants find a seven-year-old Illyana inside the husk of her eldritch armor. She still possesses the bloodstone locket.

Illyana returns to Russia, where she lives with her parents for some months until they are murdered by the Russian government to secure Illyana's abilities to defeat a psionic being known as the Soul Skinner. Illyana then returns to the X-Mansion to live with her brother and the other X-Men. Not long afterwards, Illyana contracts the Legacy Virus, and dies in the X-Mansion, despite all efforts to save her made by Charles Xavier and Moira MacTaggert. Colossus sacrifices himself to disperse the cure for the Legacy Virus.

Belasco eventually deposes Amanda Sefton and, after seeing Illyana reappear during "House of M" and realizing he carries a torch for her, creates a powerful spell to return her to him. The spell pulls forth the remaining essence of Illyana still held within Limbo's dimension, taking shape as Darkchilde, the semi-demonic version of Illyana corrupted and transformed by dark magic. Belasco is not satisfied with his creation, claiming that it is not the true Illyana due to lacking a soul, and banishes her to the outer parts of Limbo.

Illyana, now with her Darkchilde persona, discovers some of the teenage New X-Men being attacked by a horde of demons. After aiding the mutants against the demons, she uses a spell to immobilize them and steal a portion of Pixie's soul, in the hopes of creating both a bloodstone and a new Soulsword, as Illyana felt Pixie had the most innocent of souls present. Anole breaks free from Illyana's confinement and dispatches her. Pixie's soul extraction is partially successful, creating one part of a bloodstone pendant and a soul dagger. Illyana attempts to complete the process and destroy those who wished to interfere, but Rockslide thwarts her, and causes Illyana's human memories of her friends and life among the X-Men to return to her.

Illyana succumbs to her Darkchilde persona and announces her desire to create several more bloodstones to become god-like in power. She is interrupted by the arrival of Colossus, investigating Illyana's apparent return to life. A pained Illyana rejects her brother's offers of help, and sends everyone back to Earth, before reclaiming Limbo's throne and informing S'ym and N'astirh, now once more her servants, that her next move is to reclaim her soul. Motivated by her friendship with Shadowcat and love for Colossus, Illyana tries to reclaim her soul through love and teleports to the Xavier Institute, only to find it destroyed and abandoned.

Cover art for X-Infernus #1. Magik as Darkchilde. Art by David Finch.

While in Limbo, Illyana attacks various demons in her search for the Bloodstone amulet. Belasco's daughter, Witchfire appears during the meeting and reveals she is the current owner of Illyana's Bloodstone amulet and vows to take her father's place as ruler of Limbo. Back at the X-Men's base in San Francisco, Pixie accidentally discovers Magik's Soulsword is hidden inside Nightcrawler. Sensing its presence, Illyana teleports in and reclaims her sword, transforming from the Darkchilde into her Magik persona. She strikes Colossus when he enters the Danger Room and calls out to her, realizing that something is wrong when she does not feel any emotions, and returns to Limbo. Witchfire has conquered Limbo and Magik's armies during her absence. Claiming everything that Belasco ever owned, Witchfire captures Magik, takes her bloodstone and adds it to the amulet.

The X-Men arrive at the castle; Nightcrawler finds Illyana chained to a pillar. At her direction, he stabs her with Pixie's soul dagger, re-releasing the Soulsword inside of her. Witchfire completes the set of Bloodstones via another portion of Pixie's soul and releases the Elder Gods. Illyana and the other mutants hold back Witchfire and the Elder Gods. Using a combination of magic and the powers of the Soulsword and Souldagger, Illyana and Pixie remove one of Pixie's bloodstones. The Elder Gods are swept back to their dimension, along with Witchfire and the remaining bloodstones. Pixie's Souldagger merges with the bloodstone that was pried loose by Illyana. Saddened by the loss of her and Pixie's remaining bloodstones, Illyana teleports the mutants back to the X-Base, and they convince her to stay with them.

=== Return to X-Men/New Mutants ===
When Hope Summers and Cable return to the present during the 2010 "X-Men: Second Coming" storyline, Bastion begins eliminating all mutant teleporters to trap the mutant population on Utopia. While trying to bring Hope and Cable to Utopia, Illyana is fired upon by one of the Purifiers with a supernatural weapon that opens a portal to Limbo that she cannot control; she is drawn into the portal by a cluster of demonic tentacles. She is eventually freed from her restraints by Pixie, and Illyana and her rescue team return to Earth.

In a reversal of fortune, Pixie is kidnapped by Project Purgatory, and Magik returns to Limbo with the New Mutants to rescue her. While in Limbo, the New Mutants encounter the Inferno Babies - mutants who were taken as infants by the government and raised and trained in Limbo. This now-adult team attacks and overwhelms the New Mutants. While the rest of the team is captured, Magik escapes to Earth with Karma and Pixie. After hiding the Soulsword inside Karma, Magik teleports the rest of the X-Men to Portal Epsilon, Project Purgatory's gateway to Limbo, for what the X-Men believe to be a rescue mission. They arrive just as Limbo's Elder Gods breach the gateway to Earth. Karma releases Legion's mind with the Soulsword, freeing him to use his powers to destroy the Elder Gods and return the bloodstones belonging to Magik and Pixie, thus restoring their souls.

Confronted by Cyclops afterward, Magik admits to putting the world in danger and manipulating the X-Men for the sake of a personal vendetta against the Elder Gods. Cyclops decides that she must be restrained. While she remains unrepentant, she accepts his decision. Magik is placed in the X-Brig 2, a newly constructed, ultra-high security prison 500 ft. below sea level. She is controlled by devices that detect and prevent the use of teleportation and magic.

Following the events of Schism, Magik is selected to be a member of Cyclops' "Extinction Team." Despite this status, she remains a prisoner. She is only released from the X-Brig for missions, and while in the field, her suit contains lethal failsafes that prevent her escape.

In Avengers vs. X-Men, Illyana is chosen as one of the "Phoenix Five", a group of X-Men granted additional powers by the Phoenix Force. After Ms. Marvel is defeated by Rogue, Magik appears and gags the Avenger before teleporting her into Limbo, trapping her and terrifying Rogue. Following the defeat of Cyclops, Magik and the other former members of the Phoenix Five are reported to have fled. The Phoenix apparently has damaged Magik's powers, like it apparently did to the other five; Illyana initially thinks her ability to channel increased energies from Limbo is a power upgrade, but Dormammu pulls her into Limbo, and demonstrates that her newfound ability to effortlessly summon Limbo energies is destroying Limbo. Dormammu later pulls the entire Uncanny team into Limbo, intending to kill them in front of Magik before he kills her. They fight back and Illyana absorbs all of Limbo's mystic energy, causing it and its creatures to disappear. She sends the X-Men back to Earth, and travels back through time to become the protégé of a past version of Doctor Strange.

Magik is employed by Karma to lead a new New Mutants team along with Wolfsbane, Rictor, Strong Guy, Prodigy, and Boom-Boom.

=== Dawn of X ===
After the formation of the mutant sovereign state of Krakoa, Magik is granted the rank of Captain in the Quiet Council. She joins Sunspot and the other New Mutants in travelling to Shi'ar space to locate Cannonball. Magik and the rest of the New Mutants are arrested once the Starjammers arrive at a space station to rob a highly valued object, having been believed to be behind the attempted thievery. The New Mutants are quickly bailed out by Cannonball's wife, Smasher, under the order that they are to protect Deathbird in transit to the Shi'ar homeworld to instruct her niece in the way of rule. The team was attacked by the Death Commandos who Oracle had ordered to keep Xandra of the throne, Magik excitedly defeated several of them all knowing she was not human and therefore was not violating Krakoa's laws. With Deathbird's help they defeated them all and took control of their ship. Once they arrived on Chandilar they ambushed Oracle for trying to have them killed leading to a fight between the New Mutants and the Imperial Guard. Xandra put a stop to the fight by announcing that Oracle and Deathbird will both be her mentors and the New Mutants return to Krakoa. Sunspot stays behind to spend more time with Cannonball.

After this she went on many more missions with the New Mutants to bring more Mutants to Krakoa, and developed a fondness for teaching and mentoring, training the islands youth at the Akadamos Habitat, teaching Magic at Strange Academy, and forming her own version of the Dark Riders.

==== "X of Swords" ====
In the 2020 "X of Swords" storyline, Magik is one of nine Krakoan mutants chosen by Saturnyne to fight against Krakoa's sister island Arakko in a tournament in Otherworld. She prepares by training Cypher in swordfighting. In the tournament she is twice pitted against Pogg Ur-Pogg. The first time is an arm wrestling match, in which Pogg easily beats her due to his strength. In their second fight, she outsmarts him by realizing "Pogg" means "sword" in Arakkii, and allowing him to swallow her so that she can pull the actual Pogg Ur-Pogg, a tiny goblin-like creature, out of his armor.

==== The Labors of Magik ====
Magik decides she does not want to balance her teaching jobs and being a captain of Krakoa while also being queen of Limbo. Wanting to transcend her traumatic past, she decides to distance herself from Limbo. Needing a new ruler for the demonic dimension, Magik (over the objections of her fellow New Mutants) offers the role to Madelyne Pryor based on her past connection to Limbo. And because, like Magik, she too has survived painfully traumatic experiences and is still a damaged soul. Illyana declares anyone normal and "untouched by darkness" to be ill-suited to rule Limbo. Due to their objections, Illyana offered to take Rahne and Dani with her to witness the handover of power. However, they were invaded by an army of demons led by S'ym, who wanted to take Limbo for himself and had his own weapon which was able to disarm Magik's soulsword. The four women were forced to flee back to Krakoa but Magik's portal failed and they found themselves stranded in a different part of Limbo. Magik found she could not teleport out of Limbo or summon her Soulsword and concluded S'ym must have destroyed it. Due to Limbo's temporal nature, they discovered an older version of herself living in a castle and using Warlock in place of her Soulsword. She revealed to them that she had been trapped in Limbo for many years fighting Technarchy-infected Demons and she and Warlock were the last two Mutants alive. She got a message from the demons offering her safe passage home for herself and her friends on the condition that she leaves her weaker older self. The two Magik's laugh in the demons face. The next day, the whole horde of demons comes in giving the younger Illyana one more chance to accept their offer. Instead, the older Illyana made her own offer - a one on one, winner takes all fight with their leader S'ym. To everyone's shock he agrees. He seems to get the upper hand but immediately after he stabs her, she reveals she is bonded to Warlock and used the stab to remove the techno-organic virus from S'ym and his allies. After watching her defeat S'ym once and for all, the team went further into Limbo, finding themselves in a fairytale world based on Alice in Wonderland. They were ambushed by guards of the Red King (Belasco) and Magik was separated from the rest of the group. She was woken up by her younger self who was still Belasco's apprentice. She told her where her friends were being held and performed a spell to summon someone who could help, bringing Colossus to them from Krakoa, much to the older Illyana's dismay. Arriving at the Red King's castle where the others were being held, Magik took great pleasure in defeating a weaker version of Belasco. In turn, this inspired the younger Illyana to undo her spell, turning the fairytale world back into Belasco's castle. Illyana said goodbye to her younger self who was happy to know she would eventually become strong enough to escape and once again the group set forth further into Limbo. After months of waiting in a cave where she continued training Pryor, the group stages an assault on the castle hoping to take Limbo back from S'ym. While initially successful, once they get inside the wall they realize S'ym is being helped by another version of Magik created by Limbo because the original spent to much time on Earth and neglected her duties. Magik allows her doppelganger to think she has the upper hand so Pryor can defeat her while she is distracted. This causes the two to merge together making Illyana once again powerful enough to send them home. Pryor becomes the new Queen of Limbo.

== Powers and abilities ==
=== Teleportation ===
Illyana Rasputina possesses the mutant ability to teleport herself and others through time and space from one location to another. She initially did this by summoning what she calls "stepping discs," which were part of a dimension known as Limbo. When she calls for a stepping disc she has to use Limbo as a midway point before she can teleport to an alternate location. Rasputina has succeeded in teleporting herself across continents, from one continent to another, and even interplanetary and intergalactic distances on occasion. Unlike most teleporters in the Marvel Universe, she can teleport through time as well as space. After Rasputina absorbed all of Limbo, the stepping discs ceased to exist; now when she teleports, hellish images of ghosts, dragons, or other supernatural creatures appear.

=== Sorcery ===
Textless cover of X-Men: Return of Magik #1 (November 2008). Art by Olivier Coipel and Mark Morales.

Illyana Rasputina is the sorceress supreme of her Limbo dimension. In Limbo, she is able to cast any magic spell that Belasco could, having had access to his store of sorcerous knowledge. Her sorcery is a unique mix of black magic and white magic. Belasco taught her Black magic, while she learned white magic from Ororo Munroe.

On Earth, Rasputina demonstrates astral projection, sensing mystical presences, scrying, and casting very simple spells. She uses magic of a seemingly greater strength than she could previously use in Earth's dimension. Since absorbing Limbo and becoming Doctor Strange's disciple, her magic on Earth has been considerably stronger, such as when she used spells she learned from Doctor Strange to destroy advanced Sentinels.

The more Rasputina uses her magical power, the more mystical armor appears on her body, in addition to demonic features such as horns and hooves. The armor deflects or limits attacks, both physical and magical. Her armor also provides protection from the Transmode Virus. The armor also provides Rasputina with superhuman strength, which she displayed by being able to toss the giant demon S'ym off of her several feet.

Rasputina created the Soulsword during her imprisonment in Limbo. She magically caused her own life force energy to manifest before her. Once this happened she cast her hand into a pool of eldritch energy and imagined a weapon in her mind. When she withdrew her hand she was holding the Soulsword, created from her own soul. A simple looking blade upon its origin, it develops intricate designs and forms upon itself the more Illyana uses it, becoming more powerful with each use.

Her Soulsword disrupts magical energies, constructs, and creatures. It also augments the power level of any magic user who holds it. The Soulsword generally has no physical effect, but disrupts even the most powerful magic as it passes through. Since Rasputina's resurrection, the Soulsword seems to affect psychic beings like Legion's personalities, whereas in the past the sword only affected magical creatures and spells. The only exception to this has been Kitty Pryde, who can still be cut by the Soulsword even when Pryde is using her phasing power to become intangible. Rasputina can make her Soulsword appear and vanish at will. After Avengers vs. X-Men, she has used her Soulsword against physical beings, including a Sentinel.

=== Other abilities ===
Illyana Rasputina displays formidable psionic shields, which block anyone from reading her mind, even such powerful telepaths as Professor X, the Shadow King, and Rachel Summers. Since her revival, Rasputina is able to lower her psionic shields. Due to Belasco creating the magical bloodstones with their souls, Rasputina has a psychic bond with X-Man Kitty Pryde. Because of this, a similar connection could be considered between Rasputina and Storm.

== Reception ==
=== Critical response ===
Alex Schlesinger of Screen Rant said that Illyana Rasputina has "not only seen a meteoric rise to fame over the past decade, but also has the best long-term character arc of any hero in Marvel Comics," writing, "Magik's story powerfully shows that trauma is not necessary for growth or empowerment, but one can also not undo the trauma of their past. Instead, the path forward is to reconcile your past with your present and gain strength from the freedom you have desperately fought for. Magik's story of heroic redemption, escape from abuse, and acceptance of one's identity has given this X-Men fan-favorite the best character arc in Marvel Comics." Deirdre Kaye of Scary Mommy called Illyana Rasputina a "role model" and a "truly heroic" female character. Sara Century of Syfy referred to Illyana Rasputina as one of the X-Men's most "surprisingly popular characters," saying that Rasputina is a "brave, dynamic character whose hope was crushed out of her by a much older man when she was only a child. The trauma she underwent is extreme, even by X-Men standards. Though she finds her ability to hope has been crushed, Illyana's saving grace is that she does everything in her power to keep her friends safe from harm. No longer trusting herself, she surrounds herself with good people and puts her faith in them, instead. For anyone who has been made to feel like a lesser person for the abuse they've undergone, Illyana is a surprisingly poignant character. Her continuous struggle against her evil impulses might not always work out to everyone's advantage, but the fact that she continues to try even when all hope seems to be lost is still inspirational." David Harth of Comic Book Resources stated, "She looks great, with her anime-inspired costume and giant swords making her a memorable visual. The magic side of Marvel is pretty much just her, Doctor Strange, and Scarlet Witch, and she's a more fun character than either of them. Magik has got it all: she's powerful, entertaining, looks cool, and can handle herself in battles against supervillains, demons, and dark gods."

=== Popularity and impact ===
Kofi Outlaw of ComicBook.com stated, "The character has been gaining more and more mainstream appeal in recent years – and even though the New Mutants movie adaptation became an infamous quagmire, the meteoric rise of actress Anya Taylor-Joy (who played Magik in the film) has helped make the character famous on a mainstream stage." Drew Swanson of Game Rant asserted that the tragic backstory of Illyana Rasputina in Marvel's Midnight Suns turned her into a "standout character" who would become a "fan-favorite addition" to Insomniac Games' X-Men games. Multiple fans have cosplayed Illyana Rasputina through time. In 2022, American influencer Olivia Pierson cosplayed as Illyana Rasputina for Halloween alongside Kim Kardashian as Mystique and Natalie Halcro as Selene.

== Other versions ==
=== Age of Apocalypse ===
In the Age of Apocalypse timeline, Illyana was presumed dead after Apocalypse's attacks on Russia. In reality, Illyana was taken to a slave camp known as the Core, which provides energy for Apocalypse's empire. Colossus, Shadowcat and Generation NeXt rescue her, with the members of Generation NeXt dying in the process.

=== Excalibur ===
In the Excalibur storyline "Cross-Time Caper", the team encounters a childlike version of Illyana who runs an organized crime cartel in partnership with Shadowcat. When authorities attempt to search Illyana's apartment, an altercation occurs and she is shot dead, but merely resurrects in a demonic form. Phoenix performs an exorcism on Illyana and restores her to her human state.

=== Exiles ===
The Illyana of Earth-4210 is a member of the Exiles, having been recruited to replace Blink. Illyana is killed by Hyperion, who intends to test the Timebroker's process of replacing Exiles members.

=== House of M ===
In "House of M", Illyana is a member of a S.H.I.E.L.D. squadron of mutants called the Hellions.

=== Ultimate Universe ===
In the Ultimate Universe imprint, Illyana is a member of the Rasputin family who are the leaders of the Eurasian Republic and a member of Maker's Council. She is later killed by Wolverine.

== In other media ==
=== Television ===
- Illyana Rasputina appears in the X-Men: The Animated Series episode "Red Dawn", voiced by Tara Strong.
  - Illyana Rasputina / Magik appears in X-Men '97, voiced by Courtenay Taylor. This version was killed during the destruction of Genosha.
- Illyana Rasputina / Magik was intended to appear in Wolverine and the X-Men before the series was cancelled.

=== Film ===
Illyana Rasputin / Magik appears in The New Mutants, portrayed by Anya Taylor-Joy as a young adult and Colbi Gannett as a child. This version was sold into child slavery, is at odds with terrifying creatures called the Smiling Men, did not like Danielle Moonstar at first, and is accompanied by a puppet of Lockheed.

=== Video games ===
- Illyana Rasputina appears as a non-playable character in X-Men Legends, voiced by Jeannie Elias.
- Illyana Rasputina / Magik appears as an unlockable character in Marvel: Avengers Alliance.
- Illyana Rasputina / Magik appears as a playable character in Marvel Heroes, voiced by Tara Strong.
- Illyana Rasputina / Magik appears as a playable character in Marvel Contest of Champions.
- Illyana Rasputina / Magik appears as a playable character in Marvel Future Fight.
- Illyana Rasputina / Magik appears as a playable character in Marvel Puzzle Quest.
- Illyana Rasputin / Magik appears as a playable character in Marvel Future Revolution.
- Illyana Rasputina / Magik appears as a playable character in Marvel's Midnight Suns, voiced by Laura Bailey. This version is a graduate of the Xavier Academy, former member of the X-Men, the ruler of Limbo, and a member of the titular Midnight Suns.
- Illyana Rasputina / Magik appears in Marvel Snap.
- Illyana Rasputina / Magik appears as a playable character in Marvel Rivals, voiced by Abby Trott.
- Illyana Rasputina / Magik appears as a playable character in Marvel Tokon: Fighting Souls, voiced by Jesse Vilinsky in English and by Fairouz Ai in Japanese. In the game's story, she fights in the Challenge of the Champion as part of the Unbreakable X-Men, with her powers and personality becoming more aggressive due to the Champion's presence affecting Limbo.

=== Merchandise ===
In 2024, Hasbro released an Illyana Rasputina / Magik action figure as part of the Marvel Legends action figure line.
