= Captain Britain (comic) =

British comic book feature

Captain Britain is a British comic feature published by Marvel UK – the British division of Marvel Comics between 1976 and 1985, in various anthology magazines.

The first of these was named after the strip and debuted the first incarnation of Captain Britain, Brian Braddock. The strip was revived in 1980 and appeared in various British comics before headlining a second eponymous series in 1985. After this was cancelled in 1986, many of the characters and concepts were incorporated into the Marvel Comics series Excalibur.

== Creation ==
Marvel UK had been established in 1972. In order to fit in with the style of British weeklies, titles such as The Mighty World of Marvel consisted of reprinted Marvel material in an anthology magazine format, with much of the colour removed. However, these failed to make a major impression on the market, which was dominated by titles of original British material from Fleetway Publications and DC Thomson. In response, Marvel decided the line needed a British character as a flagship title. As Marvel UK itself was effectively a packaging operation at the time with no experienced creative staff the character was devised at Marvel's American headquarters. London-born Chris Claremont - at the time a rising star in the company following his successful work on the revival of X-Men - was one of the few Anglophiles on staff, and was assigned to the title. He came up with the name, origin and cast for the new title, Captain Britain. Art duties went to experienced Incredible Hulk artist Herb Trimpe, who lived in Cornwall at the time and would recall the 8-page strips typically only took him a couple of days to draw. The designer of the character's patriotic costume, complete with Heraldic lion rampant, is unknown; Trimpe has speculated it was John Romita. The character's origin tied into British Arthurian myths, seeing 'Thames University' science student and part-time laboratory assistant Brian Braddock granted the powers and identity of Captain Britain by Merlyn and his daughter Roma after a motorcycle accident on Darkmoor. The latter was inspired by Dartmoor, site of a fact-finding vacation for Claremont and Trimpe. The new character debuted in Captain Britain #1. After the first two issues covering Braddock's origin, Captain Britain #3 introduced the initial supporting cast - love interest Courtney Ross; campus bully Jacko Tanner; and Inspector Dai Thomas, a Scotland Yard CID officer with a deep hatred of superheroes who continually tried to expose Captain Britain as a menace and discover his secret identity, and who was often gently undermined by more reasonable subordinate Kate Fraser. Claremont would later note the set-up was deliberately reminiscent of Spider-Man, considering the format to be "intro to Marvel 101".

== Publishing history ==
=== Initial run (1976-1977) ===
Captain Britain
- Captain Britain #1 cover art by Herb Trimpe

Publication information
- Publisher: Marvel UK
- Schedule: Weekly
- Title(s): Captain Britain #1-39; Super Spider-Man #231-253
- Formats: Magazine
- Genre: Superhero
- Publication date: October 13, 1976 - July 6, 1977 (Captain Britain); July 13 - December 14, 1977 (Super Spider-Man)

Creative team
- Writer(s): Chris Claremont; Gary Friedrich; Larry Lieber; Bob Budiansky; Jim Lawrence
- Penciller(s): Herb Trimpe; John Buscema; Ron Wilson; Pablo Marcos
- Inker(s): Fred Kida; Tom Palmer
- Editor(s): Larry Lieber

The title launched with some fanfare, even garnering reviews (albeit a negative ones) in The Financial Times and The Daily Record. The strip was in full colour, and in keeping with the anthologies common on the British market featured only eight pages of Captain Britain, with the magazine being filled out by reprints of Fantastic Four and Nick Fury, Agent of S.H.I.E.L.D.. In common with another quirk of the British market, the first issue featured a free gift - a cut-out-and-wear paper version of the hero's mask. Marvel arranged a visit to the UK by Stan Lee to promote the title; however, it was ill-timed as British comics were soon to be caught up in a moral panic. Fleetway's anarchic Action had rapidly grabbed British tabloid attention with its violent content, and was soon on the radar of Mary Whitehouse, a self-appointed moral guardian of the British public. This led to questions about the medium being asked in the House of Commons and Fleetway editor John Sanders being excoriated by host Frank Bough on the prime-time BBC One magazine show Nationwide. The British press, with little knowledge or interest in the medium, lumped Captain Britain in with Action despite its more wholesome content, and Lee's whistle-stop tour also saw him questioned about the violence in comics.

Captain Britain #8 would introduce Brian's twin sister, model Elizabeth "Betsy" Braddock, who was revealed to have psychic powers, with the following issue debuting Jamie Braddock, their playboy racing-car-driving older brother. However, Claremont left the title after the tenth issue; accounts differ as to whether this was due to the logistical difficulties of working on the title when fax and courier services were in their infancy, or through disputes with title editor Larry Lieber. His replacement was Gary Friedrich, best known for his role in the creation of Ghost Rider. Friedrich had also had a stint writing Sgt. Fury and his Howling Commandos and added the modern incarnation of the lead to Captain Britain as a guest character; subsequent storylines featured Captain America and the Red Skull, firming up the strip's connection to the Marvel Universe. In Captain Britain #17, Friedrich also established the British equivalent of S.H.I.E.L.D. - Special Tactical Reserve for International Key Emergencies or S.T.R.I.K.E. for short.

Due to most of the staff involved having only visited Britain as tourists, stories attempted to appeal to a British audience by featuring prominent London location such as Heathrow Airport, Regent Street and Big Ben, or figures such as the Queen, especially the forthcoming Silver Jubilee and then-British Prime Minister James Callaghan, who made several guest appearances. Paul Neary would later note that these were a major weakness of the series, doing nothing to tie the character to modern-day British readers. Sales were moribund, and Captain Britain went to black-and-white from #24 to cut costs, attempting to soften the blow with another free gift - Captain Britain's lesser-spotted 'Superjet'. Alan Davis would also recall that - unknown to the American creative team - the 'lion mark' had previously been used by the Egg Marketing Board to denote the quality of eggs, leading to many jokes at the character's expense. In a 1986 article for Amazing Heroes, N.A. Collins named Captain Britain's first costume among the six worst male superhero looks in comic history up to that point, noting the "weird sunroof mask" and the "tacky Avon jewellery".

Sales failed to improve, and after 39 issues Captain Britain was merged with Marvel UK's Spider-Man reprint title, at the time called Super Spider-Man. Captain Britain was initially featured on the front page of Super Spider-Man and Captain Britain #231 alongside the web-slinging hero, but as the weeks went on would occupy only a small corner of a handful covers. By this point Friedrich and Trimpe had also left and the strip would be subject to several creative teams made up of Marvel staffers, with contributors including Lieber, Bob Budiansky and Ron Wilson, leading to a drastic fall in quality and consistency. A hardback annual, compiling selected reprints from the weekly title, was also produced.

Meanwhile, Captain Britain had already appeared alongside Spider-Man in America. Claremont was working on Marvel Team-Up with John Byrne and decided to use the format as an introduction for Braddock via the device of him briefly rooming with Peter Parker. The two-issue storyline also saw the debut of Arcade and his Murderworld. However it was not enough to raise any immediate interest in the character from American readers, and in Britain a black-and-white reprint of the Marvel Team-Up issues (split into three episodes apiece) ended Captain Britain's run in the pages of Super Spider-Man, concluding in #253 (dated December 14, 1977) a little over a year after the character's debut.

=== Revival (1979-1986) ===
The character had been a conclusive failure for Marvel. As a result, they realised that they needed to recruit from the British comic scene, and in August 1978 Stan Lee headhunted Dez Skinn, the force behind the Eagle Award-winning House of Hammer horror anthology. In what the specialist press called "the Marvel Revolution", Skinn insisted on funds being made available to make homegrown material. Among his efforts was Hulk Comic, a weekly styled like Marvel UK's rivals boys' comics. The title mixed reprints with new material, including a fantasy strip starring the Black Knight, a character Skinn had always liked but felt was a poor fit with the modern day America. Skinn believed readers at the time would take to Marvel superheroes better if they could be blended with more popular boys' comic genres, such as fantasy. The serial was written by Steve Parkhouse, who was deeply interested in Celtic and Arthurian myths, also drawing on the works of Ursula K. Le Guin, Larry Niven and J. R. R. Tolkien. This gave a perfect opportunity to reintroduce Captain Britain, now under a British-based creative team, with veteran John Stokes on art duties, later joined by Paul Neary.

Brian Braddock made a cameo as an as-yet-unnamed figure of mystery in the first three-page episode. His identity was made clear in the fourth instalment, and after positive reader response Captain Britain's role in the story gradually increased, filling in some of the fictional backstory explaining his absence in the process. Hulk Comic failed to sell as well as hoped and the number of original strips dwindled (with the title twice modifying its name in the process) but the popularity of The Black Knight saw it (aside from occasional breaks, at one point being replaced by a reprint of Captain Britain's origin from Captain Britain #1-2) continue until the title was finally folded into Spider-Man Comics in May 1980. It was the only strip to occasionally displace the Hulk from the front cover. The same year did also see the publication of a one-off Captain Britain Summer Special, reprinting selected issues of the 1976 series and some extant Black Knight material. Skinn would later describe the serial as "epic" and felt it was one of his proudest achievements at Marvel.

==== Captain Britain strip ====
Captain Britain
- Captain Britain (Vol.2) #3 cover by Alan Davis

Publication information
- Publisher: Marvel UK
- Schedule: Monthly
- Formats: Original material for the series has been published as a strip in the comics anthology(s) Marvel Superheroes; The Daredevils; The Mighty World of Marvel; Captain Britain.
- Genre: Superhero
- Publication date: September 1981 - February 1986
- Number of issues: Marvel Superheroes #377-388; The Daredevils #1-11; The Mighty World of Marvel (Vol. 2)#7-16; Captain Britain (Vol. 2) #1-14

Creative team
- Writer(s): Dave Thorpe; Alan Moore; Jamie Delano; Alan Davis
- Artist(s): Alan Davis
- Editor(s): Paul Neary; Bernie Jaye; Ian Rimmer

By then Skinn had quit Marvel UK, with Neary taking over as the offshoot's editor-in-chief. He wanted to keep producing new material but there was very little money to fund it. Neary paused commissioning covers to free up resources to make a new Captain Britain feature for flagship anthology Marvel Superheroes (renamed from Mighty World of Marvel in September 1979). Even then he was only able to hire newcomers and turned to editor Dave Thorpe, who had never written before, and Alan Davis, an acquaintance of Neary's who had only recently turned professional with some short pieces published in Rampage and 2000 AD. Thorpe and Neary had already devised the idea of sending the character to a parallel Earth when Davis came on board, while the character of Jackdaw from The Black Knight was kept on at the editor's suggestion. Davis was tasked with redesigning the lead character's costume with the stipulation to lose the clumsy sceptre, with the artist taking a cues from military uniforms in the new look and bulky out his physique. His unused concepts for the character would later be used for some of the Captain Britain Corps. The new team debuted in Marvel Super-Heroes #377, in September 1981; it had initially been advertised as appearing in #375, but was hit by delays.

The combination of Thorpe and Davis initially seemed to work well, though Davis would later recall Thorpe's work was very experimental for the genre, reflecting he was ahead of his time. Among Thorpe's creations were the Crazy Gang, Mad Jim Jaspers and Saturnyne, as well as coining the use of the title "Earth-616" as the Marvel Universe's 'home' dimension (though it would not be used in print until after he had left). However, Thorpe would fall out with Davis and Marvel after only a few months when he wrote a story featuring Captain Britain resolving the Troubles in Northern Ireland. Davis felt this trivialised the issue to the point of offensiveness; Neary agreed and ordered Thorpe to re-write the story. The writer turned in the same script, modified only to use obvious anagrams in place of real names associated with the Troubles. Davis was infuriated and Neary again backed the artist, leading to Thorpe leaving the strip. It would be his only published comics work. His replacement was Alan Moore, who had contributed stories to Marvel UK's Doctor Who Weekly and Star Wars Weekly licensed titles. The new team moved the strip in a darker tone, reconfiguring Jaspers as a powerful reality-warping mutant and introducing the unstoppable hero-killing cybiote The Fury. Jackdaw was killed off, and in Marvel Super-Heroes #388 Captain Britain seemed to join him.

This allowed the strip to cover the character's resurrection and history in a new title, The Daredevils, in January 1983. The title's critical success allowed for an increase in the page-count of the Captain Britain strip. In keeping with the heavier tone of the "Jaspers' Warp" storyline at the time, the anthology also featured reprints of Frank Miller's acclaimed Daredevil run and appearances by Marvel UK's masked vigilante Night Raven. Despite both the new title and the ongoing strip receiving good notices, including an Eagle Award, The Daredevils was a sales disappointment and was cancelled after 11 issues in November 1983, with Captain Britain transferring back to the relaunched Mighty World of Marvel. Following the conclusion of the "Jaspers' Warp" storyline in June 1984, Moore left the series. The writer has stated that this was due to Marvel firing editor Bernie Jaye; however, Davis recalled that Jaye had resigned on her own terms, and that Moore had departed due to a financial dispute. Despite this, Moore still recalled enjoying the results of his work on the title, feeling it was overshadowed at the time by his work on Marvelman and V for Vendetta.

Meanwhile the character was also selected for a sizeable role in Marvel Super Hero Contest of Champions, a crossover limited series published by Marvel UK's parent company. However, delays saw the title - originally created as to tie in with the 1980 Summer Olympics - held back until 1982. Captain Britain was parachuted in to take the place of Captain Marvel in the story after the latter had been killed off in The Death of Captain Marvel; however, at the time Marvel's New York bullpen was unaware of the redesign of the character, who appeared in his original costume throughout. A similar error was committed by Steve Ditko when Captain Britain made a brief cameo in 1985's ROM: Spaceknight #65.

Davis would briefly take over writing the story himself until being joined by Jamie Delano, an up-and-coming writer recommended by Moore, and Meggan was incorporated as a major supporting character. Neary had also left Marvel UK, being replaced by Ian Rimmer. In January 1985 the serial was transferred back to a new Captain Britain monthly series; due to a growing interest in the resurgent British industry issues of this series were exported to America, unlike the first series. The series is notable for Betsy Braddock briefly taking over the role of Captain Britain - which would become a permanent change in 2019 - and for Captain Britain killing the villain Slaymaster by crushing his head with a large rock. Davis defended this, feeling it was justified due to the villain showing he would kill again - something he contrasted with Batman's unwillingness to kill The Joker.

Sales were initially respectable but began to fall, while Davis felt Delano wasn't interested in the superhero genre and was also finding his own time to be taken up by a lucrative role as artist for DC's Batman and the Outsiders. As a result, he was given extra pages in Captain Britain #14 to tie up the storyline as the series ended in February 1986. The serial's acclaim and the growing reputation of its creators saw Marvel plan a reprint of the revival in anthology title Marvel Premiere. However, British copyright law at the time was different to that of America; while Marvel owned Captain Britain, their British employees owned copyright to the stories they created for the title, and had to give permission for reprints. Moore, irritated to find out this had been bypassed for some of his Doctor Who work and a dispute over the character of Marvelman, refused to sign off on the reprints, ending both the plans for American reprints and his professional relationship with Davis. As a reconciliatory gesture, Moore would eventually give permission for the material to be reprinted in 1995, and his storylines along with Thorpe's would be reprinted in the deluxe mini-series X-Men Archives featuring Captain Britain. The strips were coloured, and have since been collected in trade paperback form. Captain Britain meanwhile would appear as a guest character in Captain America #305-306, with art from Neary.

== After cancellation ==
Following the end of the Captain Britain series, most of the cast would appear in the Marvel Comics spinoff series Excalibur.

== Collected editions ==
| Title | ISBN | Release date | Issues |
|---|---|---|---|
| Captain Britain | 9781854000200 | 17 November 1988 | Material from The Mighty World of Marvel (Vol. 2) #14-16 & Captain Britain (Vol. 2) #1-14 |
| Captain Britain | 9780785108559 | January 2002 | X-Men Archives featuring Captain Britain #2-7 |
| Captain Britain Vol. 1 - Birth of a Legend | 9781905239306 | 2 February 2007 | Material from Captain Britain (Vol. 1) #1-23 |
| Captain Britain Vol. 2 - A Hero Reborn | 9781905239726 | 28 November 2007 | Material from Captain Britain (Vol. 1) #24-39 & Spider-Man & Captain Britain #231-245. |
| Captain Britain Vol. 3 - The Lion and the Spider | 9781846534010 | 26 March 2009 | Material from Spider-Man & Captain Britain #246-53 & Hulk Comic #1 & #3-30 |
| Captain Britain Vol. 4 - Siege of Camelot | 9781846534331 | 16 April 2010 | Material from Hulk Comic #42-55 & #57-63 & X-Men Archives featuring Captain Britain #1-6 |
| Captain Britain Vol. 5 - End Game | 9780785108559 | 6 December 2010 | Material from X-Men Archives featuring Captain Britain #1-6 & Captain Britain (1988 TPB) |
| Captain Britain: Legacy of a Legend | 9781302906689 | 23 November 2016 | Material from Captain Britain (Vol. 1) #1-2, Marvel Team-Up (Vol. 1) #65-66, Hulk Comic #1, #3-5, #57-59, Marvel Super-Heroes #377-384 & #386, The Daredevils #3-4, The Mighty World Of Marvel #8-12 & Captain Britain (Vol. 2) #14. |
