= Jaspers' Warp =

Comic book storyline

- The cover to Marvel Super-Heroes #387, art by Alan Davis
- Publisher: Marvel UK; Marvel Comics
- Publication date: September 1981 – June 1984
- Genre: Superhero
- Title(s): Marvel Superheroes #377–388; The Daredevils #1-11; The Mighty World of Marvel (Vol. 2) #7-13
- Main character(s): Captain Britain; Betsy Braddock; Captain UK; Saturnyne; Roma; Merlyn; Mad Jim Jaspers; The Fury

Creative team
- Writer(s): Alan Moore; Dave Thorpe
- Artist: Alan Davis
- Inker(s): Jenny O'Connor; John Aldrich; Steve Craddock

Jaspers' Warp, sometimes referred to as Crooked World, (Note: The story has never been given an official name by Marvel or its creators.) is a superhero comic book storyline from the British Captain Britain strip printed across several Marvel UK titles between 1981 and 1984.

The story is noted as one of the few Marvel Comics works by writer Alan Moore, and among the earliest works by artist Alan Davis. It has received consistent critical acclaim and been reprinted by Marvel on several occasions. The storyline is also credited with officially coining the designation "Earth-616" in reference to the events of the mainstream shared fictional Marvel Universe. While it was first used in print by Moore in the episode "Rough Justice" (in The Daredevils #7) it is generally agreed to have been devised by the strip's initial writer, Dave Thorpe.

== Creation and publication history ==
Captain Britain had originally been created in 1976 for the British comics market but his original weekly title, created by Marvel's New York staff, was a failure. The character was resurrected by Dez Skinn in 1979 as a guest star in The Black Knight, a serial in Hulk Comic, with the story now created in-house by Marvel UK, written by Steve Parkhouse with art from John Stokes and Paul Neary. While well received by readers, Hulk Weekly and other parts of Skinn's "Marvel Revolution" were not a sales success, and he left the company after only a year. Neary took over as Marvel UK editor-in-chief and strove to keep new Captain Britain material going. However, budgetary restrictions meant he was only able to afford novices. Editor Dave Thorpe was given the job of writer – his first and, as it would turn out, last professional comics work. He and Neary devised a story span out of the Black Knight strip, featuring Captain Britain on an alternate world in order to allow Thorpe's ambitious plans without disrupting the main Marvel Universe. Neary also decided that the character's Star Sceptre needed to go, and instead the character's source of power was internalised in his revised suit, which was designed by Alan Davis. The latter had begun professional comics work only a short while before, and the work on Captain Britain would be his first regular, ongoing serial.

The new Captain Britain feature debuted in Marvel Superheroes #379 in September 1981, and initially was only five black-and-white pages per monthly instalment. Thorpe introduced some concepts that would run in Captain Britain-related titles such as Excalibur for years to come – the Alice's Adventures in Wonderland-influenced Crazy Gang and amoral Saturnyne, who was visually modelled on actress Lauren Bacall. However, the team only lasted nine months before a disagreement broke out when Thorpe planned to have the characters travel to Northern Ireland and resolve the Troubles. Davis felt this was crass, and after Thorpe made what he saw as a disingenuous modification to the story took the dispute to Neary. The editor sided with the artist and Thorpe left. As an interim measure a fill-in story set before the events of the first chapter, written by Neary and Davis, would follow.

Thorpe's replacement was Alan Moore, had contributed short stories to Marvel UK's Doctor Who Weekly and Star Wars Weekly, as well as well-received material for the Tharg's Future Shocks feature in 2000 AD. Moore rewrote the final page of Thorpe's final completed chapter, retconning Crazy Gang leader Mad Jim Jaspers into a powerful reality-warping mutant who turned the world upside down. In two short episodes Moore introduced the hero-slaying cybiote Fury, killed off Jackdaw and saw the injured superhero executed by the Fury. Captain Britain would instead be resurrected the following month in a new Marvel UK anthology, The Daredevils – so called for the magazine also featuring reprints of Frank Miller's award-winning Daredevil run. This new home saw Captain Britain expanded to eight pages, while Davis introduced a method whereby he would draw multiple pages in landscape orientation which would then be pasted together to form a single page, allowing considerable detail.

While both the strip and publication drew acclaim (including an Eagle Award for 'Best Comic'), The Daredevils would only run for 11 issues before low sales saw it cancelled in November 1983. By then the story had transferred the action – including the Fury – to Captain Britain's home dimension; reintroduced original series characters Betsy Braddock, Dai Thomas, Mastermind and Slaymaster; featured a guest appearance from Moore's Doctor Who Weekly creations the Special Executive, their line-up expanded by Davis creations; and introduced the multiversal Captain Britain Corps, female crime lord Vixen and Linda McQuillan, the fugitive Captain Britain analogue Captain UK, originally from the crooked world. Another sequence saw the heroes of Captain UK's Earth massacred by the Fury in flashback; rather than using alternate versions of Marvel characters Moore and Davis used renamed versions of classic British comic characters, including Tom Rosetta (Tim Kelly from Kelly's Eye), Robot Andy (Robot Archie), Gaath (Garth), the Arachnid (The Spider) and Roy Risk (Dan Dare). It also included an analogue of Marvelman, a character Moore and Davis were working on in rival publication Warrior; for copyright reasons the Captain Britain version was renamed "Miracleman", some two years before legal reasons would see Marvelman take on the name. Following the end of The Daredevils, the strip would transfer to the recently rebooted Mighty World of Marvel, where after seven more chapters the story finished – having introduced Meggan and killed off Merlyn.

== Plot ==
Captain Britain and Jackdaw are transported from Otherworld to Earth-238 by Merlyn, immediately stumbling on a bank robbery being committed by Mad Jim Jaspers and the Crazy Gang, driving them off. They soon find they are in a Britain where the population are downtrodden and impoverished under the totalitarian British National Party, police are armed and superheroes are banned. Captain Britain successfully saves London from an attack by a strange animated junkyard creature but the feat fails to convince the authorities, particularly the brutal armed paramilitary Status Crew, of his good motives. He finds a mysterious liquid that has created an intelligent rat called Algernon, and traces the source to Majestrix Saturnyne of the Dimensional Development Council. She and her agents the Avant Guard are attempting to use life-enhancing fluid to advance the development of Earth-238, which is so regressive it is corrupting other parallel worlds. Having seen the miserable people of Earth-238, he agrees to help her with the push. Captain and Britain help the Avant Guard distribute the fluid, which has an immediate effect. However, at the moment of the push itself Jaspers uses his mutant reality-altering power to twist London into a nightmare.

Believing Captain Britain is responsible, the Status Crew unleash the Fury, a bio-mechanoid that had previously purged Earth-238 of superhumans. Saturnyne and the Avant Guard abandon them and Jackdaw is killed. The Fury is impervious to Captain Britain's furious attacks and easily breaks his arm. After a surreal encounter with the Fury's creator Jaspers he finds himself in a graveyard for the Fury's victims and berates Merlyn for sending him to such a place before the Fury obliterates him. Merlyn and Roma recover his remains and rebuild him in Otherworld and return him to Darkmoor on Earth-616, unaware of his death and resurrection. He returns to Braddock Manor and finds it has been rebuilt by Mastermind; after the computer attempts to talk him into suicide he is able to reprogramme it to be more benevolent. Soon after he receives a phone call from his sister Betsy in London. She has put her telepathic abilities to use as a member of S.T.R.I.K.E.'s Psi Division, but it had been infiltrated by agents of Vixen, and now Betsy and her friends are under attack from the hired assassin Slaymaster. Captain Britain is able to defeat Slaymaster after a battle on Denmark Street, and takes Betsy and two other surviving telepaths – her lover Tom Lennox and their friend Alison Double – back to Braddock Manor.

Soon after he is abducted by the Special Executive and reluctantly taken to the Dimensional Development Court, where Saturnyne is on trial for her alleged failures on Earth-238. Despite her deserting him he feels compelled to tell the court of Jaspers – but is infuriated when Judge Lord Mandrake simply wipe Earth-238 out of existence, and is able to act as judge and prosecutor at Saturnyne's trial. He comes into conflict with the members of the Captain Britain Corps acting as bailiffs, leading to the Special Executive coming to his aid and helping to evacuate the hero and Saturnyne back to Braddock Manor. There they are visited by Linda McQuillan – formerly Captain UK, the equivalent to Captain Britain of Earth-238 and now sole human survivor of the planet. She was sent to Earth-616 by her late lover and is alarmed to find the dimension's version of Sir James Jaspers is espousing exactly the same firebrand anti-hero rhetoric that led to the purge in her home dimension. However, it is soon revealed that something else escaped the destruction of Earth-238 – the Fury. It attacks Linda, who is saved by Merlyn's intervention, then aided by Captain Britain and the Special Executive. However, in the resulting battle two members of the Executive are killed, leader Wardog has his cybernetic arm torn off and further casualties are only avoided when the Fury is briefly unable to register Zeitgeist, giving Captain Britain and Fascination the chance to bury the machine. At Zeitgeist's insistence Wardog then reluctantly orders the Special Executive to leave.

Jaspers meanwhile has rapidly seized control of Britain, with S.T.R.I.K.E. having rounded up anyone with any hints superhuman talents into concentration camps. Captain Britain and his remaining allies head to London to help but are largely forced underground, with Jasper's warping abilities causing problems for Allison and Betsy, and Linda still traumatised by the return of the Fury. Vixen meanwhile attempts to assassinate Jaspers before he attracts the attention of The Avengers or S.H.I.E.L.D., but he is too powerful and simply turns her into a docile animal. Captain Britain sets off to confront him but Jaspers' enforcers kill Tom before capturing Betsy and Alison. Despite his best efforts, Captain Britain finds Jaspers' ability to change reality on a whim makes him impossible to fight, and things get worse when the Fury – having escaped the chasm near Braddock Manor – arrives. After trouncing the hero it moves on to Jaspers, who has also created a new Crazy Gang. Realising that the immunity the mutant's Earth-238 version built in does not apply to the Earth-616 version, the Fury attacks Jaspers and a reality-bending battle begins; their duel causes so much damage to reality that Merlyn is killed. The Fury finally transports Jaspers to un-space, where there is no reality for him to alter, and is able to kill him. Returning to Earth-616 drained, it is attacked by Captain Britain. When the damaged machine fights back Captain UK – snapped out of her malaise by Saturnyne – finishes the Fury off.

The crisis is over, and Roma transports Captain Britain, Captain UK and Saturnyne to Otherworld to attend Merlyn's funeral with the rest of the Captain Britain Corps. After the ceremony she reveals to Captain Britain that Earth-616 is already rapidly healing from Jasper's warp, and that Saturnyne has returned to the Dimensional Development Council, rapidly blackmailing her way back into power. She then returns Brian and Linda to Darkmoor, where they briefly kiss before parting.

== Reception ==
Jackson Ayres praised Moore's impact on the strip, noting the apparent moment of salvation for Earth-238 being instantly turned into its downfall. Christian Holub of Entertainment Weekly would refer to the storyline as a "classic". Comic Book Resources would later identify the impact it had on subsequent X-Men comics. Despite his subsequent enmity towards Marvel Comics, Moore still thinks positively of the storyline, calling it "fun" and feeling it was overshadowed at the time by his work on Marvelman and V for Vendetta.

== Legacy ==
=== Aftermath ===
The conclusion of the story would be Moore's last work on both the character and for Marvel UK. Differing reasons have been given for his departure; in 2001, Moore himself recalled he was unhappy with the firing of Daredevils editor Bernie Jaye. However, in 2007 Davis attributed it to a payment dispute and recalled Jaye had chosen to resign some months previously. Davis would take over as writer himself briefly before being joined by Jamie Delano on the series, which would continue in The Mighty World of Marvel before becoming the lead strip of a new monthly Captain Britain magazine in January 1985.

Despite a fictional conceit where few were left with detailed memories of the events, subsequent storylines would follow up on several ideas developed for the "Jaspers' Warp" storyline. The storyline's return to Betsy Braddock, previously a minor supporting character in the original Captain Britain series, would continue to play a large part in subsequent stories, even briefly taking on the mantle of Captain Britain herself before going on to cross over with a major role in the best-selling Uncanny X-Men. Having made a brief introductory cameo in the "Jaspers' Warp" story, Meggan was given a large supporting role and would go on to be Captain Britain's partner for much of his subsequent fictional adventures. Both the Crazy Gang and Saturnyne would reappear both in Captain Britain's solo adventures and in Excalibur, which would also feature the Warpies – a group of children mutated by the effects of Jasper's powers.

=== Earth-616 ===
Thorpe devised the term "Earth-616" as a narrative device to differentiate between the two Earths featured in the storyline. He intended it as a reference to the number of the beast, and to refer to the hellish alternate dimension. However, when Moore used it in print the definition referred to the characters' "home" reality. The term was subsequently used in Excalibur and has since been picked up intermittently by other Marvel publications and media. Both Joe Quesada and Tom Brevoort have since gone on the record to state they dislike the term.

=== Reprints ===
Due to both the story's critical success and the growing reputation of its creators (Moore having swiftly found wider acclaim on DC Comics' Swamp Thing and Davis on Batman and the Outsiders), Marvel UK's parent company wanted to print the stories in Marvel Premiere. However, Marvel UK contracts and British copyright law required creators to sign off on any reprints of their work. Moore, whose earlier grievance had been compounded by this permission having been bypassed for some of his Doctor Who Weekly material and what he perceived as bullying tactics by Marvel in their legal action over Marvelman's name, refused – much to Davis' chagrin.

Moore would eventually consent to reprinting of the work some years after the event, in what he has referred to as a conciliatory gesture towards Davis. As a result, the stories – including Thorpe's run – were repackaged as a seven-issue deluxe mini-series called X-Men Archives featuring Captain Britain from 1995 to 1996; these colour versions of the story would effectively become the masters for future reprints. In 2001, Joe Quesada would enter discussions with Moore in an attempt to persuade him to return to Marvel. As a result, in 2002 Moore's part of the run only was collected in a trade paperback simply titled Captain Britain; however, the volume was missing promising indicia crediting Moore and Davis as creators for certain characters and as a result Moore reaffirmed his vow to never work for Marvel again. In 2010 the complete storyline was split across Panini Comics' collections of Captain Britain material.

==== Collected editions ====
Title	ISBN	Release date	Issues
Captain Britain	9780785108559	January 2002	X-Men Archives featuring Captain Britain #2-7
Captain Britain Vol. 4 – Siege of Camelot	9781846534331	16 April 2010	Material from Hulk Comic #42-55 & #57-63 & X-Men Archives featuring Captain Britain #1-6
Captain Britain Vol. 5 – End Game	9780785108559	6 December 2010	Material from X-Men Archives featuring Captain Britain #1-6 & Captain Britain (1988 TPB)

=== Sequels ===
Original Captain Britain creator Chris Claremont's read the storyline, and was impressed with the development of the characters and immediately planned a sequel to "Jasper's Warp" featuring Jaspers, the Fury and the rest of the Captain Britain cast that would be a major X-Men plot arc. Betsy was featured in New Mutants Annual #2 in 1986, soon joining the X-Men as Psylocke, while Jaspers made what was planned to be a teaser appearance in Uncanny X-Men #200, with the plot line of Charles Xavier's exile to the Shi'ar Empire intended to serve as a catalyst. However, Claremont was then made aware of the dispute then in progress between Alan Moore and Marvel, and with the publisher wary of litigation the storyline was retooled. The Jaspers cameo – during which the character had not demonstrated his powers – was not followed up on, while the role intended for the Fury was instead filled by new character Nimrod. Some of the planned storylines would later be used for the X-Men arcs "Mutant Massacre" and "Fall of the Mutants". Claremont's desire to work with the characters was fulfilled when he co-created Excalibur with Davis in 1987.

Instead in 2007 a sequel to the story was told in the X-Men: Die by the Sword series, which brought the death of Roma and the end of the New Excalibur title.
