= List of Exiles characters =

Exiles and New Exiles were comic book series which featured an ensemble cast of Marvel Comics characters. Exiles vol. 1 featured the fictional teams of the eponymous Exiles and rival Weapon X, both of which had a revolving cast, most often rotating under the plot device of character death. The characters were either previous established or new re-imagings of established characters.

== Founding members ==
Character	Real Name	Joined in	Notes
Blink	Clarice Ferguson	Exiles #1, rejoins in #37	The character is from Age of Apocalypse-universe. She is shown to possess the Tallus, and is team leader. The characters notably in the series is sent "home"; returns to the team after the death of Sunfire. She then leads the second team of Exiles and is recruited again by Nick Fury to lead the third team.
Nocturne	Talia Josephine "TJ" Wagner	Exiles #1	The alternate-reality daughter of the Scarlet Witch and Nightcrawler. Becomes pregnant by Thunderbird but miscarries after his injury; ends up being swapped for Beak and spends time on Earth-616. Rejoins the team in Exiles vol. 2 #6 after Blink goes to lead a third team.
Morph	Kevin Sidney	Exiles #1	Only long-standing member; was offered to be sent home once but declines, saying he needs the team and cannot abandon them or the Earths in peril. Becomes possessed by Proteus, but continues as a member of the team.
Thunderbird	John Proudstar	Exiles #1, rejoins in #98	From a reality where he is made into War of the Horsemen of Apocalypse; ended up brain-dead in Exiles #10. He still remains in the stasis, dreaming, until he awakes and rejoins the team. He later leaves to be with Nocturne. He was last heard of as still residing on Heather Hudson's Earth.
Mimic	Calvin Montgomery Rankin	Exiles #1	Introduced in Exiles #1. The character hails from a seeming paradise for superheroes, where he is a premiere hero. Mimic is shown to wear the Tallus and briefly leads the team. Dies after being consumed by Proteus.
Magnus	Magnus Lehnsherr	Exiles #1	The alternate-reality son of Rogue and Magneto. Anyone he touches skin-to-skin is lethally turned into solid steel. Dies in Exiles #2 containing a nuclear explosion in a reality where Magneto was good and Xavier was evil; replaced by Sunfire. He is sent home with a note explaining his story; until then, his parents had thought he had run away.

== Replacements ==
Character	Real Name	Joined in	Notes
Sunfire	Mariko Yashida	Exiles #2	Replaces Magnus after he sacrifices himself; revealed to be a lesbian; died from a collapsing building when Mimic went on a rampage while being possessed by a Queen Brood egg. Her ashes are taken back to Legacy World where she had a relationship with Mary-Jane Watson (that reality's Spider-Woman) during a mission detour.
Sasquatch	Heather McDaniel Hudson	Exiles #10	Replaces Thunderbird after he is rendered brain-dead. She is a super-humanly strong beast, possessed by Tanaraq after she is gravely injured; Tanaraq is purged from her body, leaving her powerless. Is replaced by Sabretooth. Served as the teams' coordinator in the Panoptichron until she believed the entire Exiles team died. She gets very drunk and returns to her home planet, where she becomes pregnant by her husband. Rejoined the Exiles in Exiles vol. 2 #6, no longer pregnant.
Magik	Illyana Nikolievna Rasputin	Exiles #22	Replaces Blink. She is a magically powered teleporting mutant. Killed by Hyperion.
Namora	Namora McKenzie	Exiles #46	Alternate female version of Namor. The 'Queen of Atlantis' conquers her planet prior to joining the team. She is killed by Hyperion.
Beak	Barnell Bohusk	Exiles #48	Trades places with Nocturne; only to be replaced by Holocaust. He is recruited to the team to save the multiverse from Hyperion, which he successfully does by making friends. After he does so, he is allowed to return home, where he is immediately depowered during the Decimation.
Sabretooth	Victor Creed	Exiles #59	Originating from the Age of Apocalypse, Sabretooth is Blink's father figure. He is initially placed on the team to distract Blink from leaving. He wears the Tallus during the end of the first series, assuming the role of leader following the end of the first series Sabretooth later returns home and dies trying to save the rest of his team, the "X-Terminated", during the "X-Termination" event.
Holocaust	Nemesis	Exiles #60	Also from the Age of Apocalypse reality as Sabretooth and Blink; he is introduced as a replacement for Beak, as well as to serve as a distraction to the team by Hyperion. Killed by Hyperion.
Longshot		Exiles #74	As part of a bargain Heather Hudson made with Mojo which allowed the semi-memory wiped Longshot to join the team in exchange for Mojo to have the ability to view more dimensions in the Multiverse than he had access to previously and receive video feed of the Exiles to turn into a "reality show". Longshot left the team to try and resume his life with Dazzler.
Spider-Man	Miguel O'Hara	Exiles #76	From the 2099 approximation. Joined when Proteus, in the body of Hulk 2099, publicly unmasked him, ruining his life in his home universe. With the desire to help the Exiles track down and catch the villain who did this to him, Spider-Man was the first member to join the team voluntarily. Spider-Man later revisited his home reality, making sure his family was safe after his identity was exposed. Later quit the Exiles after settling on Earth-6375 with a Mary Jane Watson. Killed during the Spider-Verse event by Morlun.
Power Princess	Zarda	Exiles #78	From Squadron Supreme. Joined in Hyperion's place to help the Exiles catch Proteus and a Squadron appointed liaison to watch the Exiles. Quit the team to return to the Squadron Supreme.
Proteus	Kevin MacTaggert	Exiles #69	From the visit to House of M, Proteus has been the first enemy the Exiles had to hunt through realities and their second antagonist. He was successful in attempting to possess Morph, but was brainwashed by Blink with help from a device from the Squadron Supreme. As a result, Proteus only has access to Kevin Sidney's memories, therefore believing that he is the real Morph. He later merged with Morph, but the two are later split when Panoptichron absorbs the new Exiles.
Psylocke	Elizabeth "Betsy" Braddock	Exiles #90	From New Excalibur. Powers and abilities include: telekinesis, a mastery of ninjutsu, and an immunity to telepathy, reality alterations, and spells. Eventually, she rejoined the X-Men.
Cat	Katherine "Kitty" Pryde	Exiles #98	Somehow appeared in the Panoptichron at the end of Exiles #96, joined with Thunderbird in #98. Keeps shifting from one alternate Kitty Pryde shape to another. She was selected (or even perhaps created) by the Panoptichron to direct it, but refused. Died while killing Madame Hydra.
Mystiq	Raphael-Raven Darkholme	Exiles #99	A male version of Mystique who had a child with Destiny (though both the child and her died). Was saved by Sabretooth when he was attacked by soldiers at his lover's grave. Joined the team when they went to pick him up again. Was absorbed by Panoptichron.
Rogue	Anna Raven	Exiles #99	An apparent criminal who lived in Japan. Was saved from the Avengers by Morph and tagged along when the team went to get him. She has the powers of flight, super-strength and disintegrating matter through her hands. She apparently can call any power she has absorbed during her life. Quit the team to stay with a lover from an alternate reality the Exiles visited.
Sage	Tessa	X-Men: Die by the Sword #5	New resident of the Panoptichron and liaison of the team to it. Now merged with the Panoptichron itself, replacing the "Cockrums". She eventually left the team and turned up on another alternate Earth.
Gambit	Remy LeBeau	New Exiles#4	Son of a Sue Storm and a black Namor. Joined the Exiles willingly. Quit the team to succeed as the king of his world after his father's death. Was later absorbed by Panoptichron.
Valeria Richards		Exiles #93	Met the Exiles in her reality and then created a device to hop from realities to realities. In one of those, she called the Exiles for help, in order to save the world for villains known as the Fearsome Quintet and wanted to join them, but they refused as they were hunting Empress Hydra, her mother, and did not want her involved. Later reaches the Panoptichron by herself and joins the team. Was later absorbed by Panoptichron.

== Weapon X, Wolverines, Quentin Quire, and other teams ==
Weapon X was an alternate, more violent team recruited by the Timebroker to deal with more gruesome missions. After the Timebreakers fired the original Exiles Team, they gathered multiple squads consisting solely of alternate versions of Wolverine. The last Wolverine squad was formed in Exiles #85 and consisted the members listed below. Another team led by Quentin Quire was created by Blink to fix a world where heroes had died but this time was left in one dimension and was never meant to travel through other. Finally, several teams were shown in Exiles (vol 3) #6 but responded to other Timebrokers.

=== Weapon X ===
Character	Real Name	Joined in	Notes
Kane	Garrison Kane	Founding member	First appeared in Exiles #5. Killed by Namor and replaced with the Vision off-panel in Exiles #12.
Deadpool	Wade Wilson	Founding member	First appeared in Exiles #5. Was first "killed" by Sabretooth who snapped his neck in Exiles #13. He was killed in the Crystal Palace by She-Hulk in Exiles #68.
Sabretooth	Victor Creed	Founding member	First appeared as a Weapon X member in Exiles #5. Stayed behind on a world ruled by Sentinels in Exiles #13; he is from the same reality as Blink; former leader of Weapon X. Joined the Exiles in Exiles #59.
Mesmero	Vincent	Founding member	First seen in #62. He was killed off panel before Exiles #5 and confirmed dead in Exiles #68. He was not immediately replaced but after some mission by the second wave of recruits (Hulk, Storm, and Daredevil).
Wolverine	"Logan"	Founding member	First seen in #62. He was killed off panel before Exiles #5 and confirmed dead in Exiles #68. He was not immediately replaced but after some mission by the second wave of recruits (Hulk, Storm, and Daredevil). Was somehow romantically involved with Mariko Yashida on his world.
Maverick	Christoph David Nord	Founding member	First seen in #62. Killed off panel before Exiles #5 when he was impaled by a razor-pointed throwing shield from Captain America. He was not immediately replaced but after some mission by the second wave of recruits (Hulk, Storm, and Daredevil). He was Nick Fury's best agent.
Daredevil	Matthew Michael Murdock	Second wave of recruits	First seen in #62. Taken away off panel between Exiles #6 and #12. Confirmed dead in #68. He is one of the Kingpin's agents.
She-Hulk	Jennifer Walters	Second wave of recruits	First appeared in Exiles #12. Was pulled in the Negative Zone in Exiles #24 but was actually in stasis in the Panoptichron; sided with the Exiles during the battle with Deadpool, killed him.
Storm	Ororo Munroe	Second wave of recruits	First appeared in Exiles #12. Killed during a mission to stop an alternate Bruce Banner in Exiles #38; was replaced by Hyperion.
The Spider	Peter Parker	Daredevil's replacement	First appeared in Exiles #12. Killed by Firestar with a mega-blast from her powers in Exiles #44.
Vision		Kane's replacement	First appeared in Exiles #12. Killed when an alternate reality was devastated in Exiles #40.
Iron Man	Anthony Stark	Exiles #13	Replaced Deadpool. Was sent to the Crystal Palace and replaced off-panel. He was in stasis in the Panoptichron's Crystal Palace showing stable life-signs.
Gambit	Remy LeBeau	Sabretooth's replacement	First appeared in Exiles #23. He replaced Sabretooth as the team leader and wore the Tallus. Sacrificed himself to kill Hyperion with Magik's sword charged with kinetic energy in Exiles #45.
Archangel	Warren Kenneth Worthington III	Iron Man's replacement	First appeared in Exiles #23. He was replaced off-panel. Was in stasis showing stable life-signs in the Panoptichron.
Colossus	Piotr Nicoleivitch Rasputin	Exiles #24	Replaced Hulk. Died when he ran out of oxygen after being blasted into the vacuum of space by Hyperion in Exiles #40.
Ms. Marvel	Carol Danvers	Archangel's replacement	First appeared in Exiles #38. Killed in battle with Morph in Exiles #45.
Hyperion	Mark Milton	Exiles #38	Replaced Storm. Questioned the Timebroker's motive and decided to rule Earths instead of fulfilling the team's missions. Was first "killed" by Gambit and the Exiles in Exiles #45; ended up in the Crystal Palace where he escaped and started playing with the Exiles including replacing Heather by Sabretooth and Beak with Holocaust; was sent back to his reality where Earth was devastated by the nuclear war in Exiles #63 by alternate versions of himself, one of which was from the Squadron Supreme.
Hulk	Robert Bruce Banner	Exiles #40	Replaced Colossus, was there to kill Hyperion and failed. Killed by Hyperion in Exiles #40.
Firestar	Angelica Jones	Exiles #40	Replaced Vision, was there to kill Hyperion and failed. Killed in the backlash of her own powers while killing the Spider in Exiles #44.

=== Wolverine squads ===
Character	First appearance	Notes
Patch	Exiles #85	From the same Earth as Weapon X's Daredevil. Killed by Brother Mutant.
Zombie Wolvie	Exiles #85	Not the same Zombie Wolverine who first appeared in Ultimate Fantastic Four #22-23 and Marvel Zombies #1-5. The original Marvel Zombies version became a member of The Galactus as of Marvel Zombies #5. Killed when Elsie-Dee's internal bomb went off.
Albert Dee	Exiles #85	An android built to destroy Wolverine, Elsie-Dee's acolyte. Killed in the blast when Logan attacked Brother Mutant.
Elsie-Dee	Exiles #85	A gynoid built to destroy Wolverine, Albert Dee's acolyte. Detonated her internal bomb to weaken Brother Mutant.
Weapon X	Exiles #85	Logan, right after his adamantium was implanted on him by the Weapon X Program. Assumed dead in the Exiles attack on Brother Mutant.
James Howlett	Exiles #85	He has just discovered his powers and thus has assumed neither Logan's nor Wolverine's identity. The only Wolverine Exile to return home alive from the team introduced in Exiles #85.
Major Logan	Uncanny X-Men #141/Exiles #85 (as an Exile)	Snatched by the Timebroker moments before his apparent demise at the hand of the Sentinels. He, Marvel Girl, and Kate Pryde are the only known survivors from the X-Men in this timeline. Killed by an energy blast as he nearly killed Brother Mutant, his death echoes the one featured in his own timeline (although a Sentinel, not another mutant, killed him in that timeline). He was subsequently resurrected by X-51 of the Earth X universe.
Others	Exiles #85-86	43 other Wolverine versions were to be seen on issue #86 cover, a Hulk, a clown, and a Thing version were featured in the comics and at least three were on the Panoptichron's screen at the end of #86. 27 of them died, according to Heather Hudson (including 6 of the 7 main). Other versions included female Wolverines, Brother Xavier, and a Deadpool-like version.

The mission of these Wolverine Teams was to eliminate the Brother Mutant, but Brother Mutant captured and hypnotized them. Finally, the last Wolverine team manages to kill the Brother Mutant, with the help of the first Exiles team. In the end, seventeen Wolverines perished during the fight. James Howlett was the only member sent home.

=== Quentin Quire's Exiles ===
Character	First appearance	Notes
Power Fist	Exiles #23	Leader of Mary Jane's Avengers. Later recruited by the Exiles to replace another Earth's self who should not have died.
Nighthawk	Exiles #45	Took Morph away from the rubble after his fight with Weapon X's Ms. Marvel and was inspired by the Exiles to become a hero. Was later recruited by Quentin Quire in order to replace another Earth's Nighthawk who should not have died.
Quentin Quire	Exiles: Days of Then and Now	From an Earth where Hulk took control of the Annihilation Wave, killing almost every hero. Led by Blink to recruit some heroes to save his own Earth.
Spitfire	Exiles: Days of Then and Now	Chosen by Blink to replace an Earth's Iron Man after being led to become a hero by Quentin Quire.
Wild Child	X-Men: Alpha	Sabretooth's "dog". Driven mad by the loss of his master, he was saved by Quentin and sent to replace another Earth's self who should not have died. Eventually, both Sabretooth and Wild Child return home to the Age of Apocalypse and are reunited; however, Wild Child dies while helping Earth-616's X-Force take on a corrupt Archangel.

Their mission was to save Quentin's world by replacing heroes who had died.

=== Other teams (Exiles #6) ===
- First team: Kang the Conqueror, Silver Surfer, Iron Man, Daredevil, Spider-Man, The Thing, later on an overweight Colossus, a male and female Sentry, a male and female Quentin Quire, Archangel and Prodigy.
- Captain America, Wolverine, Spider-Man, The Hulk, two unknown members. Timebroker: Impossible Man
- MODOK, The Lizard, Deadpool, Venom, Selene, one unknown member. Timebroker: Mojo
- The Thing, Namor, four unknown members. Timebroker: Howard the Duck
- Match, Icarus, two unidentified members, two unknown members. Timebroker: Silver Surfer

== Exiles vol. 2 recruits ==
Character	Real Name	Joined in	Notes
Polaris	Lorna Dane	Exiles #1	Recruited while battling Sentinels
Beast	Dr. Hank McCoy	Exiles #1	Recruited while battling M.O.D.O.K.
Panther	T'Chaka	Exiles #1	Recruited while fighting Klaw. T'Challa and Storm's son.
Witch	Wanda	Exiles #1	Recruited while trying to resurrect her brother.
Forge		Exiles #1	Married to Storm. Recruited while about to sacrifice himself to get rid of the Skrulls.
Scarlet Witch		Exiles #6	Managed to switch places with the Exiles' Wanda and took her place when she was killed by Emma Frost.

== Exiles vol. 3 recruits ==
Character	Real Name	Joined in	Notes
Khan	Kamala Khan	Exiles #1	Sacrifices herself to stop the Time Eater.
Iron Lad	Nathaniel "Nate" Richards	Exiles #1	
Valkyrie		Exiles #2	Her horse, Elendil, is killed during a battle with an alternate version of Professor X.
Wolvie	James "Logan" Howlett	Exiles #2	
Peggy Carter	Margaret "Peggy" Carter	Exiles #8	

== Other characters ==
In Exiles there has been a number of other characters including special heroes and villains; some of them are even significant in more than one reality or story.

Character	First appearance	Notes
Timebroker/Icon/Lady/Morph	Exiles #1	The apparent founder of the Exiles, supposedly a construct of the Exiles and Weapon X'ers collective subconsciousness, later revealed to be an interface created by the Timebreakers to lure conscripts into cooperating. The Timebroker interface is now used for communication when the Tallus can not be used. It has been seen in four forms: a butler for the Exiles, a lady for Weapon X and Icon, a mini-Heather for when she was in charge, a Wolverine-look-alike butler for the Wolverines and an ever-changing Morph for the second Exiles team.
Mojo	Exiles #18	Ruler of Mojoworld. Managed to make the Exiles come to his world and tortured Nocturne to get Morph to star in a show. Later made a deal with Heather to give her Longshot while he got access to the Panoptichron's data and as such could broadcast any reality.
Spider Woman	Exiles #23	Sunfire's lover from the Earth that had been infected by the Vi-Locks. It was to her Earth that Nocturne and Sunfire were sent when the Vampire King disrupted their teleport in Exiles #32 and #34. Considered Sunfire's true love, it's on her Earth that Morph had her buried.
Timebreakers	Exiles #63	A race of insectoid aliens. They recruited both the Exiles and Weapon X teams. They have a hive-like societal structure. They used to maintain the systems in the Crystal Palace.
Hyperion	Exiles #64	From Squadron Supreme. Battled Hyperion from Weapon X in Exiles #65 and asked Beak to keep an eye on the Exiles. Proteus took advantage of it to slow the Exiles down in Exiles #76-78 and he almost joined the team, but Power Princess stepped in instead.
Hyperion	Exiles #64	Blind Hyperion who was recruited by Beak to help defeat Weapon X's Hyperion. He then returned to his Earth after leaving the Exiles in Beak's "care".
Doctor Strange	Exiles #65	Did not go to Tibet and thus did not have any powers, but in turn was the best doctor of the Multiverse. Helped heal Morph and Mimic after the second fight against Hyperion. He was killed by Deadpool, who tried to escape from the Panoptichron.
Madame Hydra	Exiles #91	An evil version of Sue Storm who can go from reality to reality, killed by Cat in New Exiles #16.
Slaymaster	Exiles #92	From Madame Hydra's team. Killing Psylocke after Psylocke since the 616 version escaped him.
Wolverine	Exiles #92	Madame Hydra's new lover, killed by Cat in New Exiles #12.
The elderly pair	Exiles #96	Dave Cockrum lookalikes who claimed to be the former owners of the Panoptichron. They have appeared to Psylocke to warn her about an impending threat (Rouge-Mort's army and Mad Jim Jaspers) and have brought Blink back from the future after a teleportation gone wrong. They temporarily stayed at the Panoptichron with the team.
New Excalibur	X-Men: Die by the Sword #1	Psylocke's brother's team. Consists of Nocturne and 616 versions of Dazzler (Longshot's wife), Pete Wisdom, Captain Britain, and Sage.
Roma and Opal Luna Saturnyne	X-Men: Die by the Sword #1	Majestrix of the multiverse, guardian of all reality and a Courtney Ross counterpart, Roma's servant.
Mad Jim Jaspers	X-Men: Die by the Sword #1	A former British Prime Minister fused with Fury during the House of M, turned mad and attacked Roma.
Rouge-Mort and her squad	X-Men: Die by the Sword #1	A strike force apparently linked to Mad Jim Jaspers.
Captain Britain Corps	X-Men: Die by the Sword #2	Defenders of the Multiverse, one for each reality.
Venger	New Exiles #6	Recruited by Madame Hydra after he faced off against the Exiles.
The Unseen	Exiles Vol. 3 #1	Recruits Blink to lead a new team of Exiles.

== Line-ups ==
The Exiles' line-up is known to change quite often, here is a list of its various compositions: By issue number

Issues	Characters	Notes
Exiles (Volume 1)
#1	Nocturne, Blink, Morph, T-Bird, Mimic, Magnus	
#2–11, 42	Nocturne, Blink, Morph, T-Bird, Mimic, Sunfire	Magnus sacrificed himself to save a world and was replaced by Sunfire.
#12–22, X-Men Unlimited #41	Nocturne, Blink, Morph, Mimic, Sunfire, Sasquatch	T-Bird was left brain dead after stopping Galactus and replaced by Sasquatch.
#22, 26–37	Nocturne, Morph, Mimic, Sunfire, Sasquatch, Magik	Blink was (secretly) sent to help Sabretooth and replaced by Magik.
#37, 43–45	Nocturne, Morph, Mimic, Sasquatch, Magik, Blink	Mimic, possessed by a Brood egg, kills Sunfire and Blinks returns.
#45–46	Nocturne, Morph, Mimic, Sasquatch, Blink	Magik is killed by Hyperion.
#46–48	Nocturne, Morph, Mimic, Sasquatch, Blink, Namora	Namora replaces Magik.
#48–57	Morph, Mimic, Sasquatch, Blink, Namora, Beak	Nocturne is swapped for Beak.
#57–59	Morph, Mimic, Blink, Namora, Beak, Tanaraq	Tanaraq takes over Sasquatch.
#59–62	Morph, Mimic, Blink, Namora, Beak, Sabretooth	Heather, purged from Tanaraq is lost during the jumped and replaced by Sabretooth.
#62–64	Morph, Mimic, Blink, Namora, Sabretooth, Holocaust	Beak is lost and replaced by Holocaust.
#65	Morph, Mimic, Blink, Sabretooth, Beak, Heather Hudson	Both Holocaust and Namora are killed by Hyperion, while Beak and Heather are freed from the crystal wall.
#66–68	Morph, Blink, Sabretooth, Beak	An injured Mimic is put into stasis, Heather stays at the Panoptichron.
#68–71	Morph, Blink, Sabretooth, Beak, Mimic	Mimic takes his place back after copying Deadpool's powers.
#71–74	Morph, Blink, Sabretooth	Beak is left home while Mimic is taken over by Proteus.
#74–76	Morph, Blink, Sabretooth, Longshot	Longshot is recruited by Heather.
#76–78	Morph, Blink, Sabretooth, Longshot, Spider-Man 2099	Spider-Man voluntarily joins the team.
#78–82	Morph, Blink, Sabretooth, Longshot, Spider-Man 2099, Power Princess	Power Princess joins to watch the Exiles for the Squadron Supreme.
#82–84	Blink, Sabretooth, Longshot, Spider-Man 2099, Power Princess	Morph is taken over by Proteus.
#84–90	Blink, Sabretooth, Longshot, Spider-Man 2099, Power Princess, Proteus	Proteus is brainwashed and joins the team, believing himself to be Morph.
#90–98	Blink, Sabretooth, Longshot, Spider-Man 2099, Proteus, Psylocke	Power Princess leaves, Heather Hudson recruits Psylocke. She then leaves when she believes the team to be dead. Psylocke takes her spot over.
#98	Blink, Sabretooth, Longshot, Spider-Man 2099, Proteus, Psylocke, T-Bird, Cat	T-Bird awakens and rejoins the team, Cat appears at the Panoptichron and becomes part-time liaison to it.
#99, X-Men: Die by The Sword #1–5	Blink, Sabretooth, Longshot, Proteus, Psylocke, T-Bird, Cat, Rogue, Mystiq	Spider-Man is left on his own Earth to live happily with a new girlfriend after a mission mishap. Rogue and Mystiq voluntarily join.
New Exiles
#1–4	Sabretooth, Proteus, Psylocke, Cat, Rogue, Mystiq, Sage	Longshot reunites with Dazzler and leaves, Blink, Nocturne and T-Bird take a leave. Sage joins.
#4–17	Sabretooth, Proteus (then Morph), Psylocke, Cat, Rogue, Mystiq, Sage, Gambit	Gambit joins voluntarily. During the annual, Morph and Proteus fuse their essences.
#17–18	Sabretooth, Morph, Psylocke, Rogue, Mystiq, Sage, Gambit	Cat dies to kill Hydra, Sage fuses her essence to the Panoptichron.
#18; X-Men: Sword of the Braddocks	Sabretooth, Morph, Psylocke, Mystiq, Sage, Valeria Richards	Rogue stays in a world where she found love, Gambit returns to his world to inherit his father's throne, and Valeria Richards arrives at the Panoptichron to join the team.
Exiles (Volume 2)
#1–6	Polaris, Beast, Panther, Forge, The Witch, Blink	Morph acts as the Timebroker, all the members but Blink are snatched right before their deaths.
#6	Polaris, Beast, Panther, Forge, Scarlet Witch, Nocturne	Scarlet Witch secretly takes over The Witch's slot and Nocturne replaces Blink.
Exiles (Volume 3)
#1	Blink, Khan, Iron Lad	
#2–5	Blink, Khan, Iron Lad, Valkyrie, Wolvie	Khan dies to stop the Time-Eater.
#6–7	Blink, Iron Lad, Valkyrie, Wolvie	
#8–12	Blink, Iron Lad, Valkyrie, Wolvie, Captain America, Sgt. Becky Barnes, King	

== See also ==
Exiles
