= Lehnsherr (disambiguation) =

Lehnsherr is a type of feudal lord.

It may also refer to several fictional characters:

- Erik Lehnsherr, a.k.a. Magneto
- Edie Lehnsherr
- Magnus Lehnsherr
- Charles Lehnsherr
