= Magnum (comics) =

Magnum, in comics, may refer to:

- Magnum, a member of the Elementals in Marvel Comics
- Moses Magnum, a Marvel Comics villain

== See also ==
- Magnum (disambiguation)
- Magnus (comics)
