= X-Men: Die by the Sword =

- Cover to X-Men: Die by the Sword #1

Publication information
- Publisher: Marvel Comics
- Format: Limited series
- Genre: Superhero
- Publication date: December 2007 – February 2008
- No. of issues: 5

Creative team
- Written by: Chris Claremont
- Penciller: Juan Santacruz
- Inker: Raul Fernandez

Collected editions
- X-Men: Die by the Sword: ISBN 0-7851-2791-7

X-Men: Die by the Sword is a five-issue comic book limited series published by Marvel Comics in 2007. It was written by Chris Claremont, drawn by Juan Santacruz, and inked by Raul Fernandez.

The story featured the teams New Excalibur and Exiles.

== Publication history ==
The events of the mini-series take place following New Excalibur #24 (the last issue of that series) and between the issues of Exiles #99 and #100. Due to a minor delay in publishing New Excalibur #24 was actually released one week after X-Men: Die by the Sword #1.

This mini-series served as a conclusion to both Exiles vol. 1 and New Excalibur, though Captain Britain and some of New Excalibur continue on in Captain Britain and MI: 13, part of the Secret Invasion crossover event. Exiles was later restarted as New Exiles.

=== U.S. release dates ===
- Exiles #99: October 3, 2007
- New Excalibur #24: October 17, 2007
- Issue 1: October 10, 2007
- Issue 2: October 24, 2007
- Issue 3: November 14, 2007
- Issue 4: December 5, 2007
- Issue 5: December 12, 2007
- Exiles #100: December 19, 2007

== Plot ==
=== Issue 1 "The Sword is Drawn" ===
The story starts with all of the members of New Excalibur celebrating their recent defeat of Albion. Captain Britain answers the door and is surprised that it is his sister, Psylocke, because he believed her dead after she defeated the Shadow King. She tells him that she was part of the Exiles for a while, and she introduces her teammate, Thunderbird, to Captain Britain. Thunderbird wanders through the party, and when Nocturne sees him she jumps on him and gives him a kiss while expressing her surprise that he is alive. The last time she saw him, he was lying in a bed apparently brain dead while she was pregnant with his child. Psylocke explains to Captain Britain what the Exiles do, and he is slightly offended because protecting the multiverse is something that he, as the leader of the Captain Britain Corps, is in charge of, and he was angry that someone else had taken over the job.

Most of the first issue focuses on Mad Jim Jaspers, who was attacked by his creation Fury and inexplicably survived. He is approached by Merlyn for a deal, but before the deal is explained their meeting is interrupted by three members of the Captain Britain Corps. Jaspers is easily able to defend himself, and he turns two of the Captains into green creatures resembling The Fury. The third Captain is killed by one of the Fury-like creatures. After the battle is over, Merlyn proposes an alliance between the two of them.

There is a one-page interlude where Roma tells Saturnyne to summon the Captain Britain Corps and prepare them for battle, because "The time has come to face the reality that all things—perhaps even all people—are ultimately finite. And must someday come to their end."

Back at the party Pete Wisdom gives Dazzler a new motorcycle, Thunderbird and Nocturne have a long conversation as they restart their relationship, and Captain Britain goes to answer another knock at the door where he is stabbed by Rouge-Mort, who is accompanied by multiple figures in black military gear.

=== Issue 2 "First Blood" ===
The second issue starts with Psylocke attacking Rouge-Mort in retaliation for attacking Captain Britain. Psylocke is able to hit Rouge-Mort numerous times but they do not seem to affect her, and Rouge-Mort sends Psylocke flying with a hard hit. Sage and Thunderbird join in and are able to easily defeat the henchmen in black while Nocturne gets all of the civilians out of the club. Nocturne tries to possess Rouge-Mort, but her armor prevents that from happening. However, Captain Britain is bleeding profusely because the stab wound is very close to his heart. Dazzler uses her power to create a blinding flash of light as a diversion so New Excalibur and the two Exiles can all be teleported to the Panoptichron.

In the Panoptichron, Nocturne is reunited with her friends Morph and Blink, who are extremely happy to see her. Dazzler is reunited with Longshot, but his memory has been erased by Mojo so he does not remember that they are married. Because of this Dazzler contemplates jumping to her death but Mystiq talks her out of doing so. Sage is able to work with the computer of the Panoptichron to help save Captain Britain's life and bring him to a stable condition. Cat checks Roma's headquarters to see what is happening to the rest of the Captain Britain Corps, and the issue ends with the entire Corps attacking Jaspers and his two Fury-like monsters.

=== Issue 3 "When Falls a Dream" ===
Issue 3 starts a few moments before the last scene of issue 2; the Captain Britain Corps are preparing to fight and Roma tells them that they are fighting to protect all reality. It is revealed that James Jaspers is not necessarily who he appears to be, and that Merlyn was driven mad by his job of protecting the omniverse and now he is attacking to regain what he believes Roma unjustly stole from him. The Captain Britain Corps attacks and gives everything they have. They are making progress against Jaspers' army of Furies, but the Furies are able to kill many of the Corps. Saturyne joins the fight and is able to severely hurt Jaspers, and as he is about to retaliate some of the Exiles join the fight. Blink, Sabretooth, Thunderbird, and Morph start a team attack that appears to be beating Jaspers. Meanwhile, Rouge-Mort attacks the bodyguards of Roma, but Dazzler appears to protect her.

Meanwhile, Captain Britain is struggling to stay alive, so Cat visits an alternate dimension set of X-Men (Nightcrawler, Storm, and Colossus) who are very gifted doctors. Psylocke and Sage fight with Pete Wisdom about letting Albion free so that he can help in the fight. Reluctantly Wisdom agrees.

=== Issue 4 "When Is Born the Nightmare" ===
Psylocke, Sage, and Wisdom go to Crossmore and come to an agreement with Albion that he will help them, but not try to escape afterwards. Dazzler fights Rouge-Mort and the Janissaries (this is the name for the soldiers in black with Rouge-Mort that is finally revealed) while Longshot leads Roma to a secure area. Along the way they are ambushed by more Janissaries and Sage joins the fight to help Longshot defeat them. Unfortunately Roma is stabbed during the fight. Also Longshot's feelings for Dazzler start to return, but he does not understand why since his memories are still not there. Longshot helps Dazzler defeat Rouge-Mort, but they are both knocked out by Merlyn.

The fight against Jaspers is no longer going well, and Jaspers is winning. He is starting to try to turn Morph into a Fury, but Albion arrives in time to stop him. Albion is able to land some heavy blows, but it seems to have no effect. Then Jaspers slowly turns into the original Fury and kills almost all of the few remaining members of the Captain Britain Corps. The final page of the issue shows Captain Britain ready to join the fight.

=== Issue 5 "Dawn of a New Day?" ===
Captain Britain battles the Fury, shaking Roma's Starlight Citadel apart and trapping Albion and the Exiles. Roma, on the verge of dying, transfers her knowledge into Sage's brain, nearly driving her mad. Merlyn finds Roma and kills her. Psylocke then fights Merlyn and easily gains the upper hand. Albion aids Captain Britain in battling the Fury. Blink teleports a full quill of javelins into the Fury, disassembling it. However, a small piece of the Fury enters Merlyn through a wound given by Longshot. Everyone corners Merlyn, who retreats. Longshot leaves the Exiles to live with Dazzler. Saturnyne chooses Albion to lead the Captain Britain Corps, since he is a tougher warrior. She dismisses Captain Britain, telling him to stay with his Earth, saying it is just too dangerous. Psylocke finds Sage, who is barely coherent and sane after the data transfer. She ends up leaving with the Exiles, telling Psylocke that the wrong people could get their hands on the data if she went back to Earth. Psylocke tells Captain Britain that she is staying with the Exiles, saying that Xavier has too many X-Men that he does not know what to do with all of them and he will not need her. Nocturne also returns to the Exiles to be with Thunderbird. The elderly couple at the Panoptichron departs, telling Psylocke that she and her crew have to guard the multiverse now. They vanish, and everyone watches as Roma is about to be buried.

== Collected editions ==
The series and related issues have been collected in trade paperbacks:

- New Excalibur Volume 3: Battle for Eternity (December 2007, ISBN 0-7851-2455-1, collects New Excalibur #16-24)
- Exiles Vol. 16: Starting Over (February 2008, ISBN 0-7851-2391-1, collects Exiles #95-100 and Exiles: Days of Then and Now)
- X-Men: Die by the Sword (March 2008, ISBN 0-7851-2791-7, collects X-Men: Die by the Sword 1-5)
- Exiles Ultimate Collection Book 6 (December 2010, ISBN 978-0-7851-3892-1, collects Exiles #90–100, Exiles: Days of Then and Now, and X-Men: Die By the Sword #1-5)
