= Lionheart (Marvel Comics) =

- Lionheart. Art by Olivier Coipel.

Publication information
- Publisher: Marvel Comics
- First appearance: The Avengers vol. 3 #77 (March 2004)
- Created by: Chuck Austen (Writer); Olivier Coipel (Artist)

In-story information
- Alter ego: Kelsey Leigh Kirkland
- Species: Human mutate
- Team affiliations: The Avengers; Captain Britain Corps; New Excalibur
- Notable aliases: Captain Britain, Lionheart of Avalon
- Abilities: Superhuman physical attributes, Flight, Sword of Might grants: Force field generation, Energy bolts

Lionheart (Kelsey Leigh Kirkland), formerly called Captain Britain, is a fictional character appearing in American comic books published by Marvel Comics.

== Publication history ==
Creators Chuck Austen and Olivier Coipel first featured her in The Avengers #77-81 (March–June 2004); in the story she sacrifices her life to protect Captain America, only to be resurrected as the new Captain Britain, but with the condition that she does not reveal her identity to her children. She went on to appear in Austen and Scott Kolins' The Avengers #82-84 (July–Aug. 2004) and Austen, Allan Jacobsen and C.P. Smith's The New Invaders #0 (Aug. 2004); in a story-line which begins with her getting angry at her own funeral causing her new teammates to begin to suspect her true identity. She made a brief supporting appearance in Brian Michael Bendis and David Finch's The Avengers #500-501 (Sept.–Oct. 2004); in which she is hospitalized in critical condition following the initial battle. Bendis and Michael Gaydos concluded her run in the Avengers with a brief appearance in Avengers Finale (Jan. 2005); in which she announces her intention to return home.

== Fictional character biography ==
Kelsey Leigh is a former schoolteacher who taught English literature and history. When she was married, thugs invaded her home, robbing her family and gang-raping her. She fought back, hurting one of her rapists, and he cut her face with a broken bottle in revenge, scarring her permanently. Her husband, Richard, was too paralyzed with fear to help her. His guilt over that incident led to the dissolution of the marriage.

Leigh and her family are caught in a battle between the Avengers and the Wrecking Crew. After Thunderball renders Captain America unconscious, Leigh is killed protecting Captain America and Wasp. Leigh is transported to Otherworld, where she encounters Brian Braddock and Meggan. Leigh is resurrected and given a choice between the Sword of Might or the Amulet of Right. However, she is not informed of the items' symbolic importance. Leigh chooses the Sword of Might and becomes the new Captain Britain. She later discovers that her decision meant that if she ever revealed who she was to her children, they would be killed.

The new Captain Britain returned to Earth, where she helped the Avengers defeat Morgan and her cronies, proving herself to be far more ruthless in battle than her predecessor, using lethal force against Thunderball (soon after revealed to be Black Knight in disguise). With her children now in the Avengers' care, Leigh accepts an offer to join the team.

Leigh remains a member of the Avengers until the events of Avengers Disassembled. When She-Hulk goes crazy after an attack by Ultron robots, Leigh steps up, once again putting herself in the path of danger to rescue Captain America. She-Hulk knocks out Leigh, who is hospitalized in critical condition. Leigh leaves the Avengers after they disband, returning home to England fully recovered.

=== New Excalibur ===
Going under the codename of Lionheart, Leigh seeks revenge and blames Captain Britain for what happened to her; for not warning her of the consequences of choosing the Sword of Might and for losing her children. After a fight between Albion and Captain Britain, Lionheart and Albion flee.

Albion returns with an army of Shadow Captains and Lionheart at his side. Using a mystical device, he neutralises all forms of modern technology, plunging Britain into a pre-industrial state. Soon after Sage joins Albion's ranks undercover, Lionheart sees the error of her ways. She joins forces with Excalibur and helps defeat Albion, restoring Britain. In acknowledgment of her help against Albion, the government of the United Kingdom gives Lionheart a second chance working with them. Braddock suggests that it is time to set things right with her family and she is reunited with her children and mother.

== Powers and abilities ==
Lionheart possesses super strength, speed, stamina, reflexes and reactions, endurance, senses, and flight. The Sword of Might gives her the ability to form energy blasts or shields.
