= Saturnyne =

Publication information
- Publisher: Marvel Comics; Marvel UK
- First appearance: UK: The Mighty World of Marvel: Marvel Superheroes #381 (January 1982); US: Excalibur Special Edition (1987) #1
- Created by: Dave Thorpe; Alan Davis

In-story information
- Alter ego: Opal Luna Saturnyne
- Species: Human
- Team affiliations: Captain Britain Corps
- Notable aliases: Omniversal Majestrix; Her Royal Whyness; White Witch

Opal Luna Saturnyne is a character appearing in American comic books published by Marvel Comics. The character was created by Dave Thorpe and Alan Davis for their Captain Britain stories. Formerly the servant of Roma, she is currently the Omniversal Majestrix and rightful Ruler of Otherworld, charged with the safety of the Omniverse.

== Publication history ==
Her first appearance was in Marvel Superheroes #381, playing a major part in Alan Moore and Alan Davis' Jaspers' Warp storyline. She later had a recurring role in the pages of Excalibur.

According to Davis, Dave Thorpe's original script had specified Saturnyne's appearance to be based on actress Veronica Lake. Davis has explained that Saturnyne "enjoys power, and she's a bit of an ice princess, which is why she's silver and blue, with a cold appearance". The Official Handbook of the Marvel Universe A-Z of 2008/09 describes Saturnyne as having a Machiavellian mind and being a cunning strategist, and while not being outright brilliant (listed as a three on a scale of seven in intelligence), her indomitable strength of will and ambition has allowed her to ascend to her lofty position through hard work without being born into it. (Note: "Saturnyne". Official Handbook of the Marvel Universe A-Z. Vol. 1, no. 10. Marvel Comics. September 2009. ISBN 978-0-7851-3028-4.)

== Fictional character biography ==
Saturnyne originally hails from Earth 9, one in a myriad of alternative universes. She is a highly intelligent and ambitious woman and ends up on Otherworld as the Omniversal Majestrix. In this role she is part of the Dimensional Development Court, overseeing the Captain Britain Corps and charged with the safekeeping and maintenance of order and reality of the entire Omniverse. Saturnyne reports to Merlyn, the Omniversal Guardian. Saturnyne feels no moral or ethical conflict in sacrificing anybody, even an entire universe, if it means the preservation of the Omniverse.

Saturnyne first comes into contact with Brian Braddock, also known as Captain Britain, on the alternate Earth known as the Crooked World. This Earth is deemed to be a threat to the Omniverse and Saturnyne convinces Captain Britain to help evolve the backwards planet, hoping to eliminate its threat. They are opposed by the Status Crew, a group charged with maintaining the status quo. Saturnyne and Captain Britain manage to evolve the world, but are surprised when a bigger threat take its place: an alternate reality Mad Jim Jaspers uses his powers to create the Jaspers' Warp, causing widespread insanity and the collapse of reality. Captain Britain and Saturnyne intend to stop Jaspers, but are killed by Fury.

The Dimensional Development Court arrest Saturnyne and replace her with Mandragon, who destroys Earth-238 to prevent Jaspers' Warp from spreading. After being resurrected, Captain Britain and the Special Executive help Saturnyne escape to Earth-616. On Earth-616, Mad Jim Jaspers, an even more powerful version than the one on Earth-238, comes into power and threatens the world. Fury kills Jaspers and is killed shortly afterwards by Captain Britain and Captain UK from Earth-238.

Saturnyne comes into conflict with Captain Britain when she sends the bounty-hunters known as the Technet after Phoenix. The Technet fail to capture her and Phoenix joins Captain Britain, Shadowcat, Meggan and Nightcrawler to form Excalibur. Saturnyne later meets Phoenix in person, but does not capture her. Saturnyne rescinds her warrant against Phoenix but indefinitely extends the Technet's exile on Earth. She also delivers a message from Roma asking the other Captain Britains to free Excalibur's Captain Britain.

During the Spider-Verse storyline, Saturnyne and Lady Roma express their concerns about the Incursions that are destroying many dimensions as Spider-UK arrives to express his concern about all the spiders across the multiverse being hunted and killed. Saturnyne rebuffs him, but Roma sympathizes with him and gives him a talisman that allows him to travel through the web of life in order to save all the remaining spiders. Saturnyne captures a Map Maker and attempts to use it to determine the cause of the Incursions, but this summons an army of Map Maker robots who kill her and the Captain Britain Corps.

As of the 2019 series Excalibur (v4), Saturnyne has been restored to life and is now referred to by some characters as the White Witch, and has gained a new enemy, Apocalypse. She has replaced Roma Regina as the Omniversal Guardian, but remains referred to as the Omniveral Majestrix by her minions.

== Other versions ==
=== Courtney Ross ===
Courtney Ross

Publication information
- Publisher: Marvel Comics
- First appearance: Captain Britain Weekly #3 (1976)
- Created by: Chris Claremont; Herb Trimpe; Fred Kida

In-story information
- Species: Human
- Team affiliations: Excalibur
- Notable aliases: The Ice Queen
- Abilities: None

Courtney Ross is a fictional character appearing in American comic books published by Marvel Comics. The character originated in the Captain Britain comics as Brian Braddock's college girlfriend, and was created by Chris Claremont and drawn by artists Herb Trimpe and Fred Kida.

Ross came from a wealthy family and attended Thames University, London, where she met and dated Brian Braddock, not knowing that Braddock was Captain Britain. She later found out about his secret life, but the two remained lovers. Captain Britain went missing shortly afterwards and Ross assumed that he had died. During Braddock's absence, Ross becomes a successful city banker nicknamed the Ice Queen. Ross previously dyed her hair, but has given up doing so, making her look exactly like Saturnyne.

Courtney Ross is killed by Sat-Yr-9, who takes her place. Art by Alan Davis.

Braddock and Ross resume their friendship, shortly before she is attacked by Arcade and the Crazy Gang. Arcade, hiding in a fake police car, captures Ross and takes her to a new Murderworld. There, Ross is forced to improvise comedy to stall Arcade until she is rescued by Excalibur. Returning home after surviving Arcade's assassination attempt, Ross is attacked and killed by Sat-Yr-9.

=== Sat-Yr-9 ===
Sat-Yr-9

Publication information
- Publisher: Marvel Comics/Marvel UK
- First appearance: (UK) Captain Britain vol. 2 #2 (Feb. 1985) (US) Excalibur #3 (1988)
- Created by: Alan Davis; Jamie Delano

In-story information
- Alter ego: Opul Lun Sat-Yr-9
- Species: Human
- Team affiliations: Hellfire Club
- Notable aliases: Courtney Ross, White Queen
- Abilities: Pheromone and hypnosis-based mind-control

Opul Lun Sat-Yr-9 is the dictator of Earth-794, along with her lover Kaptain Briton. As a child, Sat-Yr-9 exhibited psychopathic behavior such as killing animals for amusement and later killed her parents and siblings at the age of 18, always dreaming about becoming Mastrex of the dictatorship True Briton. Her political rivals followed the same fate until she had achieved her goals. Unlike Saturnyne and Courtney Ross, Sat-Yr-9 possesses mind-control abilities possibly derived from pheromone manipulation and hypnosis skills.

After murdering Courtney Ross, Sat-Yr-9 takes on her identity. Sat-Yr-9 knew about Jamie Braddock's reality warping powers before anyone else, since she has already encountered Jamie's alternate reality counterpart. Sat-Yr-9 challenges Ross's coworker Nigel Frobisher to a high-stakes card game at the Hellfire Club, and wins. Frobisher agrees to serve her, and she orders him to rescue the Earth-616 Jamie Braddock from Doc Croc, intending to use him as a weapon. Sat-Yr-9 later unmasks herself, revealing to Brian that she murdered Courtney and has taken her place; he swears revenge on the impostor for the crime as she and Jamie leaves. Still posing as Courtney Ross, Sat-Yr-9 joins the Hellfire Club as its White Queen.

=== Sat'neen ===
Sat'neen is a princess and sorceress from Earth-148. She was killed by Necrom.

=== Queen Mother ===
Queen of England in Earth-1193, a world filled with magic and mystical creatures, who coexist with humans. She is described by Brian Braddock as an "older and kinder" version of Saturnyne.
