= Fury (Marvel Comics) =

Marvel Comics supervillain

- Linda McQuillan (Captain UK) and Fury from The Daredevils #9; Art by Alan Davis

Publication information
- Publisher: Marvel Comics
- First appearance: Marvel Super-Heroes #387 (July 1982)
- Created by: Alan Moore and Alan Davis

In-story information
- Partnerships: Mad Jim Jaspers
- Abilities: Superhuman strength and durability Regeneration; Energy blasts Adaptive learning and self-modification

Fury is a fictional android character appearing in American comic books published by Marvel Comics, initially in the UK and later in the US. The character is usually depicted as an adversary of Captain Britain and the X-Men. The character was created by writer Alan Moore and artist Alan Davis, and first appeared in Marvel Super-Heroes #387 (July 1982).

== Fictional character biography ==
Fury is a deadly "cybiote" built by the reality-manipulating psychic Mad Jim Jaspers of the parallel timeline of Earth-238 and programmed to destroy all superhumans but himself. It is immensely powerful, capable of generating lethal energy blasts and of adapting and regenerating its mechanical body.

Fury kills all of Earth-238's superheroes except for Captain UK, who flees to another world after Fury kills her husband Rick. After succeeding in its mission, Fury is deactivated until Captain Britain and his sidekick Jackdaw are sent to Earth-238 by Merlyn. In response, Jaspers reactivates Fury and has it kill Captain Britain and Jackdaw.

Captain Britain is retrieved by Merlyn and resurrected in Otherworld. Fury senses Captain Britain's resurrection and develops the ability of interdimensional travel, intending to hunt him down. Meanwhile, the temporal overseer Mandragon destroys Earth-238 to kill Jaspers; Fury barely escapes to Captain Britain's native world, Earth-616. There, Fury kills several more of Captain Britain's allies, growing ever more powerful as it did so. Tracking Captain Britain and disabling him, it finally confronts Earth-616's counterpart of Mad Jim Jaspers, who is organizing a program against his own world's superhumans. Fury determines that this Jaspers was not its creator and is thus not exempt from its directive to kill superhumans. Fury and Jaspers battle until Fury transports them both to the void that was Earth-238. Jaspers, unable to use his powers with no reality to manipulate, is incapacitated by Fury. Fury returns to Earth-616, where it is ambushed and destroyed by Captain Britain and Captain UK.

A recreation of Fury created by Jamie Braddock appears in Uncanny X-Men. It takes control of X-Men member Sage and has her attack her teammates, but its control over her is severed by an electrical field created by Storm. Fury is destroyed when Rachel Summers creates a black hole inside its body, collapsing it into a singularity.

== Powers and abilities ==
Fury can adapt to anything and everything without limit, making it near-invincible. Its left arm fires energy blasts that are potent enough to kill literally every superhero in its original reality. Fury can also fire poisonous, barbed darts, which are tipped with a powerful sedative and mutagen. If damaged, it has self-repair systems, and is capable of developing new powers to deal with unexpected situations. Fury develops limited teleportation abilities, and when it continues to track the resurrected Captain Britain across realities, it acquires the ability to cross dimensions.

== Collections ==
Fury's appearances have been collected into a number of trade paperback:

- Captain Britain (by Alan Moore and Alan Davis, collects Marvel Super-Heroes #386-388, The Daredevils #1-11, & The Mighty World of Marvel #7-13, 1982–1984, 208 pages, Marvel Comics/Marvel UK, 2002, ISBN 0-7851-0855-6)
- Uncanny X-Men: The New Age, Volume 1: The End Of History (collects The Uncanny X-Men #444-449, 144 pages, Marvel Comics, December 2004, ISBN 0-7851-1535-8)
- X-Men: Die By The Sword (128 pages, Marvel Comics, April 2008, ISBN 0-7851-2791-7)
