= Captain Britain =

Marvel Comics fictional character

- Textless variant cover of Excalibur (vol. 4) #14, depicting Brian Braddock as Captain Avalon (left) and Betsy Braddock as Captain Britain (right). Art by Jesus Saiz.

Publication information
- Publisher: Marvel Comics
- First appearance: Brian Braddock: Captain Britain #1 (October 1976); Betsy Braddock: Captain Britain #8 (December 1976); Debut as Captain Britain: Captain Britain (vol. 2) #13 (January 1986); Kelsey Leigh Kirkland: The Avengers (vol. 3) #77 (Mar. 2004); Debut as Captain Britain: The Avengers (vol. 3) #80 (May 2004)

Captain Britain is a title used by various superheroes in comic books published by Marvel Comics, commonly in association with the Excalibur team of superheroes. The moniker was first used in publication by Brian Braddock in Captain Britain #1 by writer Chris Claremont and artist Herb Trimpe, and is currently held by Brian's twin sister, Betsy Braddock.

The designation of the primary continuity of the Marvel universe as "Earth-616" originated in Dave Thorpe, Alan Davis and Alan Moore's Marvel UK Captain Britain stories. The strip also established the multiversal Captain Britain Corps, members of which act as the champions of their own respective versions of the British Isles, which act as a nexus point between dimensions via Otherworld.

== Creation ==
Marvel UK, the British wing of Marvel Comics, was established in 1972. In order to fit in with the style of British weeklies, titles such as The Mighty World of Marvel consisted of reprinted Marvel material in an anthology magazine format, with much of the colour removed. However, these failed to make a major impression on the market, which was dominated by titles of original British material from Fleetway Publications and DC Thomson. In response, Marvel decided the line needed a British character as a flagship title. As Marvel UK itself was effectively a packaging operation at the time with no experienced creative staff, the character was devised at Marvel's American headquarters. London-born Chris Claremont - at the time a rising star in the company following his successful work on the revival of X-Men - was one of the few Anglophiles on staff, and was assigned to the title. He came up with the name, origin and cast for the new title, Captain Britain. Art duties went to experienced Incredible Hulk artist Herb Trimpe, who lived in Cornwall at the time and would recall that the 8-page strips typically only took him a couple of days to draw. The designer of the character's patriotic costume, complete with heraldic lion rampant, is unknown; Trimpe has speculated it was John Romita.

== Publishing history ==
=== British comics ===
The Captain Britain title launched with some fanfare, even garnering reviews (albeit negative ones) in The Financial Times and The Daily Record. Captain Britain #8 would introduce Brian's twin sister, model Elizabeth "Betsy" Braddock, who was revealed to have psychic powers, with the following issue debuting Jamie Braddock, their playboy racing-car-driving older brother. However, Claremont left the title after the tenth issue. His replacement was Gary Friedrich, best known for his role in the creation of Ghost Rider. Sales were moribund, and Captain Britain went to black-and-white from #24 to cut costs, attempting to soften the blow with another free gift - Captain Britain's lesser-spotted 'Superjet'. Alan Davis would also recall that - unknown to the American creative team - the 'lion mark' had previously been used by the Egg Marketing Board to denote the quality of eggs, leading to many jokes at the character's expense (which is likely a bit of nonsense on Davis' part, as the lion on the eggs was an Heraldic "lion passant" (on three legs with a front paw raised) while that on the chest of Captain Britain is a "lion rampant" (rearing on the hind legs and pawing the air). In a 1986 article for Amazing Heroes, N.A. Collins named Captain Britain's first costume among the six worst male superhero looks in comic history up to that point, noting the "weird sunroof mask" and the "tacky Avon jewellery".

After 39 issues Captain Britain was merged with Marvel UK's Spider-Man reprint title, at the time called Super Spider-Man. Meanwhile, Captain Britain had already appeared alongside Spider-Man in America. Claremont was working on Marvel Team-Up with John Byrne and decided to use the format as an introduction for Braddock via the device of him briefly rooming with Peter Parker. The two-issue storyline also saw the debut of Arcade and his Murderworld. The character had been a conclusive failure for Marvel. As a result, they realised that they needed to recruit from the British comic scene, and in August 1978 Stan Lee headhunted Dez Skinn. In what the specialist press called "the Marvel Revolution", Skinn insisted on funds being made available to make homegrown material. Among his efforts was Hulk Comic, a weekly styled like Marvel UK's rivals boys' comics. The title mixed reprints with new material, including a fantasy strip starring the Black Knight. The serial was written by Steve Parkhouse, who was deeply interested in Celtic and Arthurian myths, also drawing on the works of Ursula K. Le Guin, Larry Niven and J. R. R. Tolkien. This gave a perfect opportunity to reintroduce Captain Britain, now under a British-based creative team, with veteran John Stokes on art duties, later joined by Paul Neary.

Skinn quit Marvel UK, with Neary taking over as the offshoot's editor-in-chief. Neary paused commissioning covers to free up resources to make a new Captain Britain feature for flagship anthology Marvel Superheroes. Even then he was only able to hire newcomers and turned to editor Dave Thorpe, who had never written before, and Alan Davis, an acquaintance of Neary's who had only recently turned professional. Thorpe and Neary had already devised the idea of sending the character to a parallel Earth when Davis came on board. Davis was tasked with redesigning the lead character's costume with the stipulation to lose the clumsy sceptre, with the artist taking a cues from military uniforms in the new look and bulk out his physique. His unused concepts for the character would later be used for some of the Captain Britain Corps. The new team debuted in Marvel Super-Heroes #377, in September 1981; it had initially been advertised as appearing in #375, but was hit by delays.

Thorpe would fall out with Davis and Marvel after only a few months when he wrote a story featuring Captain Britain resolving the Troubles in Northern Ireland. Neary backed the artist, leading to Thorpe leaving the strip. His replacement was Alan Moore. The new team moved the strip in a darker tone, reconfiguring Mad Jim Jaspers as a powerful reality-warping mutant and introducing the unstoppable hero-killing cybiote The Fury. Jackdaw was killed off, and in Marvel Super-Heroes #388 Captain Britain seemed to join him. This allowed the strip to cover the character's resurrection and history in a new title, The Daredevils, in January 1983. Despite both the new title and the ongoing strip receiving good notices, including an Eagle Award, The Daredevils was a sales disappointment and was cancelled after 11 issues in November 1983, with Captain Britain transferring back to the relaunched Mighty World of Marvel. Following the conclusion of the "Jaspers' Warp" storyline in June 1984, Moore left the series. Meanwhile, the character was also selected for a sizeable role in Marvel Super Hero Contest of Champions, a crossover limited series published by Marvel UK's parent company. However, delays saw the title - originally created as to tie in with the 1980 Summer Olympics - held back until 1982.

Davis would briefly take over writing the story himself until being joined by Jamie Delano, an up-and-coming writer recommended by Moore, and Meggan was incorporated as a major supporting character. In January 1985 the serial was transferred back to a new Captain Britain monthly series. Sales were initially respectable but began to fall, while Davis felt Delano wasn't interested in the superhero genre and was also finding his own time to be taken up by a lucrative role as artist for Captain Britain. Captain Britain meanwhile would appear as a guest character in Captain America #305-306, with art from Neary.

=== Excalibur (1987-1998) ===
When Claremont read the reinvigorated Captain Britain stories he was impressed with the development of the characters. The result was Claremont and Davis creating the super-team Excalibur, picking up Captain Britain and Meggan from where Captain Britain had left them and adding X-Men refugees Nightcrawler, Shadowcat and the Rachel Summers incarnation of Phoenix. The group initially came together in the lavish Excalibur Special Edition in 1987, and soon became the stars of a regular series, with Captain Britain playing a major role. The success also led to Marvel printing a trade paperback compiling the material Davis had produced for the character after Moore's departure, which was coloured by several artists. Davis would redesign the character's costume again for Excalibur #13; previously it had largely been depicted in black-and-white, with Davis himself colouring the colour cover appearances. However, he found the American colourists were frequently making mistakes and so simplified it. Parallel to these storylines the character also appeared in new British material, featuring as a supporting character in Marvel UK's Knights of Pendragon series.

Captain Britain was lost in the time-steam off-panel before Excalibur #68, and when he did return was rechristened Britannic, with a redesigned costume. Warren Ellis became writer for the title in 1994, and one of his storylines involved revitalising Brian, who reclaimed the identity and costume of Captain Britain in Excalibur #100. However, Ellis would leave the series soon afterwards and his successor Ben Raab swiftly ended the title. Sales were falling and the title was cancelled in 1998, ending with Brian returning to marry Meggan. Captain Britain then spent several years without a regular title, though in 2001 Raab wrote the four-issue Excalibur limited series that involved the Captain Britain Corps and ended with Braddock as King of Otherworld.

=== New Excalibur, Captain Britain and MI: 13 and Secret Avengers ===
Brian was later featured as the team leader of New Excalibur in 2005, culminating with the X-Men: Die by the Sword limited series. Following the Secret Invasion crossover, Brian headlined the 2008 series Captain Britain and MI: 13, written by Paul Cornell, which included some characters from New Excalibur, as well as members of MI: 13 who appeared in Cornell's Wisdom limited series. The character later appeared as a regular character in the 2010-2013 Secret Avengers series, from issue #22 (April 2012) through its final issue #37 (March 2013), reappearing with the Avengers as a part of the Time Runs Out storyline.

Around the same time the character made his first appearance in a British-made comic since the end of Knights of Pendragon when Panini Comics, who had taken over Marvel UK following the latter's mid-1990s collapse following an ill-advised rapid expansion under Neary, began producing small indigenous strips for the young reader-orientated Spectacular Spider-Man. Captain Britain guest-starred in #114, dated March 2005, and written by Jim Alexander with art by John Haward and a returning Stokes. Positive reader response saw a second appearance the following year in Spectacular Spider-Man #133.

=== Dawn of X and Beyond ===
During the 2019 X-Men franchise relaunch Dawn of X, following Brian's corruption by Morgan le Fey, Betsy Braddock claimed the mantle of Captain Britain in a new volume of Excalibur written by Tini Howard. Leading a new Excalibur roster including Gambit, Rogue, Jubilee, Rictor and Apocalypse, the team comes into conflict with Morgan le Fey and the anti-mutant Coven Akkaba, as well as Saturnyne, who had usurped the role of omniversal magisitrix and refuses to accept Betsy as Captain Britain. During X of Swords, Apocalypse's secret plans of reuniting Krakoa with Arakko come to fruition, leading Saturnyne to arrange a tournament between both sides to avoid a war in Otherworld. Betsy is apparently killed in a duel with Isca the Unbeaten, shattering along with the Starlight Sword. Saturnyne reconstitutes the shards to revive the Captain Britain Corps, but is distraught when the new Captains Britain are variants of Betsy rather than of Brian. After the tournament, Betsy's consciousness becomes lost in the multiverse, returning with the assistance of Kwannon, during which the two begin to come to peace with their complicated relationship. After the revival of Morgan le Fey, Betsy leads Excalibur against Merlyn and King Arthur. As Avalon falls to Merlyn and Arthur, the mutants escape to Earth, severing the connection to Otherworld, while uses the Starlight Sword to return to the fight herself, knowing she will be trapped without the protection of Krakoan resurrection.

In the follow-up series Knights of X, also written by Howard, Betsy and the Corps take up refuge with Merlyn's daughter and former magistrix Roma, rescuing mutants facing danger in Otherworld. Refusing Betsy's request for an army, Roma instead sends her on a quest for the Siege Perilous alongside Gambit, Rachel Summers, Bei the Blood Moon, Gloriana, Kylun, Rictor, Shatterstar, Shogo Lee, and Arthur's mutant son Mordred. After being tested by the Siege Perilous, Betsy and her knights forge a pathway to Krakoa, bringing an army of Krakoan mutants to fight against Merlyn and Arthur, with Betsy finally executing Merlyn and decreeing that the Corps will not be bound by any one ruler and will instead defend the multiverse on their own terms. During this ordeal, Betsy also cemented her romantic relationship with Rachel Summers, sharing a kiss as Rachel helps the knights overcome the Siege Perilious.

Throughout the Dawn of X and subsequent stories, Betsy had been contending with an increasingly-fraught political situation at home, with forces within the British government and populace opposing the legitimacy of a mutant holding the role of their champion. This conflict worsens in Howard's series Captain Britain: Betsy Braddock, which features Betsy's further conflicts with Morgan le Fey as the villain attempts to conquer Britain with the assistance of Doctor Doom. Betsy is assisted in this series by Rachel, Brian, and Meggan (now going by the monikers of Askani, Captain Avalon, and Gloriana, respectively), as well as revived members of Pete Wisdom and the S.T.R.I.K.E. PSI Division, together defeating le Fey by forging a true respectful connection between le Fey and the land. As Brian reconstitutes the Braddock Academy, Betsy continues on with her responsibilities to Britain and the multiverse as Captain Britain and leader of the Corps.

== Fictional character biography ==
In the main continuity of Marvel Comics, three characters have used the Captain Britain title in regular publication.

=== Other ===
Modred the Mystic briefly assumed the mantle of Captain Britain by syphoning off Braddock's energies in an effort to defeat Merlyn.

=== Captain Britain Corps ===
Captain Britain Corps

Publication information
- Publisher: Marvel Comics
- First appearance: The Mighty World of Marvel #13 (June 1984)
- Created by: Alan Moore; Alan Davis

In-story information
- Base(s): Starlight Citadel, Avalon
- Member(s): Captain Britain (Betsy Braddock); Saturnyne (see member list)

==== Publication history ====
The Captain Britain Corps is a fictional league of super-heroes appearing in American comic books published by Marvel Comics. The characters are all known as, or appear as an alternative version of, Captain Britain, each coming from an alternative reality. Created by writer Alan Moore and artist Alan Davis, the corps first appeared in The Daredevils #6 (June 1983). Founded by Merlyn, his daughter Roma and Sir James Braddock, the organization is tasked with defending the multiverse. The power wielded by members of the corps is derived from absorbing and metabolizing energy generated by the matrix of "exotic particles" naturally occurring at weak points between dimensions, which are present at each dimension's equivalent of the British Isles in unusual quantity and proximity; members are tasked with safeguarding the gateways between dimensions and being the highest champion of each earth's respective morality codes. In addition to the Captains themselves, the organization has included administrators such as Merlyn, Roma, and Saturnyne.

==== Fictional organisation biography ====
Merlyn and Roma had arranged for each chosen member of the Corps to gain superpowers, often using unscrupulous means. Following Merlyn's funeral, Roma took control over the corps, making Saturnyne her subordinate and bringing Corps members to the Starlight Citadel for training. Roma also tasked Corps members to take turns in defending Otherworld. Corps members would continue to gather in for important occasions. The corps rarely fought as a unit in these stories, with an exception occurring when Roma dispatched them against Franklin Richards and the Fantastic Four.

The Corps was nearly wiped out by Mastermind, a villainous computer belonging to Brian Braddock, and a group of mutated children known as the Warpies, who were once the wards of Captain UK. Roma stepped down as omniversal guardian, giving the title to Brian Braddock, who became King of Otherworld and rebuilt the Corps. Another wave of destruction tore through Otherworld due to Wanda Maximoff's alterations to reality in House of M, which nearly led to Roma and Saturnyne erasing that universe. It once again it came under attack, this time from Mad Jim Jaspers and Corps members which he began to turn into Furys. The end of the battle saw Roma dead, along with most of the Corps along with her. Saturnyne appointed Albion the new leader as they rebuilt the corps once again. Later, the Captain Britain Corps investigate universal Incursions which are causing the destruction of various realities, and the deaths of twenty Corpsmen. After the members of the Corps capture a Mapmaker, the Ivory Kings send their entire forces to overrun the Starlight Citadel, destroying the entire Corps. Saturnyne is able to teleport Brian Braddock to safety, leaving him as the Corps' only survivor.

==== Membership ====
The Captain Britain Corps spans the multiverse; the exact number of members is unclear. Many members are simply named Captain Britain, while some others use names such as Captain U.K. or Lady London or names reflective of the specific characteristics of their respective universes (such as Hauptmann Englande or The Violet Swan) or individual circumstances (such as Spider-UK). Of the corps members depicted in publication, most, but not all, have been alternate versions of Brian or Betsy Braddock.

==== Known members ====
A number of individuals are known in-story to have been members of the Captain Britain Corps at some point in their fictional portrayals.

Title (real name)	Universe of origin	First appearance as member of corps	Additional notes
Captain Britain (Beth Braddock)	Earth-6		
Justicar Druidica	Earth-14		
Captain Britain (Elizander Braddock)	Earth-15		
Captain Amphibian	Earth-22		
Alpha Briton	Earth-33		
Sister Britain	Earth-65		
Captain Krakoica	Earth-78		
The Green Woman	Earth-99		
Captain Angland	Earth-305		
Captain Albion	Earth-523		
Captain Britain (Betsy Braddock)	Earth-616	Captain Britain (vol. 2) #13 (temporary); Excalibur (vol. 4) #1 (permanent)	
Captain Britain (Liz Braddock)	Earth-812		
Captain Bretland	Earth-904		
Captain Granbretan	Earth-1812		
Captain Plumdragon	Earth-2112		
High Priestess Celtia	Earth-2113		
Crusader X (Bran Braddock)	Earth-2122		
Centurion Britannia	Earth-4100		
Captain Baboon	Earth-8101		
The Violet Swan	Earth-8311		
Elspeth Braddock	Earth-13059		
Britannica Rex	Earth-99476		
Brother Brit-Man (Gilles Weill)	Earth-65	Excalibur #44	Killed by a Fury.
Yeoman U.K. (Brion Burdack)	Earth-148 (Ee'rath)	Excalibur #1	He was a member of an alternative Excalibur. After dying, he returned briefly as a reanimated corpse.
Captain Britain (Brian Braddock)	Earth-58163	The Uncanny X-Men #462	Ruled Britain as King in the House of M.
Hauptmann Englande	Earth-597	Excalibur #9	He was a member of Lightning Force.
Captain Avalon (Brian Braddock)	Earth-616	Captain Britain Comics #1	Brian, son of Sir James Braddock, is from the main Marvel Universe and a former ruler of Otherworld. He was the first character to use the Captain Britain title in publication and has been the leader of three incarnations of Earth-616's Excalibur as well as the Corps has worked with MI: 13. He currently uses the title Captain Avalon as defender of Avalon.
Lionheart (Kelsey Leigh Shorr)	Earth-616	The Avengers (vol. 3) #77	She is from the main Marvel Universe and was given the role as Captain Britain for a brief time before becoming Lionheart. She is a former member of the Avengers and currently lives in her home reality.
Captain Empire (Robert Doherty)	Earth-741	Mighty World of Marvel (vol. 2) #13 (June 1984)	He wore a pith helmet and a monocle.
Captain Airstrip-One (George Smith)	Earth-744	Daredevils #7 (July 1983, mentioned); Mighty World of Marvel (vol. 2) #13 (June 1984)	He appeared in a one-off solo strip written by Alan Moore for the small press title Mad Dog in 1986. His Earth is portrayed as a similar type of world to that of Orwell's novel 1984. He was among the members of the Corps slaughtered by Mastermind and the Warpies.
Kaptain Briton (Byron Brad-Dhok)	Earth-794	Mighty World of Marvel (vol. 2) #13 (June 1984)	He was killed by Betsy Braddock
Captain Britain (Brian Braddock)	Earth-811	Excalibur #66	He was killed by Sentinels.
Spider-UK (Billy Braddock)	Earth-833	Edge of Spider-Verse #2 (September 2014)	A former member of the Captain Britain Corps, he became the leader of the Web Warriors during the Spider-Verse event, but dying in Spider-Geddon.
Captain Commonwealth (Doug Andrews)	Earth-920	Daredevils #7 (July 1983, mentioned); Mighty World of Marvel (vol. 2) #13 (June 1984)	He is killed by Doctor Doom
Captain Britain (Brian Braddock)	Earth-1189	Excalibur #15	His world was devastated by nuclear war until he was killed in battle.
Captain Marshall (Bryon Bradek)	Earth-1193	Excalibur #12	Died years before the Cross-Time Caper during which his costume was handed over to Earth-616's Captain Britain.
Captain Granbretan (Paul Peltier)	Earth-1812	Captain Britain (vol. 2) #13	He eventually attempted to retire due to dissatisfaction with the Corps, but was forced to continue his activities for a brief time by his suit even past his own death.
Captain Wales (Huw Gruffydd)	Earth-6200	X-Men/Red Skull: Chaos Engine: Book Three	Killed by Doctor Doom and was posthumously honored by the Corps for his actions.
Lord Goldstar (Seamus O'Rourke)	Earth-7123	X-Men: Die by the Sword #3	Not seen, only mentioned as being present. Presumably died along with the majority of the Captain Britain Corps members present for the battle against Mad Jim Jaspers.
Captain Prydain (Lloyd Thomas)	Earth-7580	New Excalibur #18	Traveled to Earth-70518 to defeat alien slavers before being killed by Albion.
Cap'n Brit (Barry Braddock)	Earth-8910	Excalibur #14	He was from a world that was devastated by Galactus and repopulated by the Impossible Man.
Captain Britain (Brian Braddock)	Earth-9620	Excalibur #94	
Striker Llewellyn (Owein Llewellyn)	Earth-20712	X-Men: Die By The Sword #1	One of the first of the Corps to encounter Mad Jim Jaspers on his return, who transformed him into a Fury.
Lord High Justicer (Brian Braddock)	Earth-23238	Excalibur #23	He was Chief Justicer Bull's superior.
Flight Leader (Dan Hampson)	Earth-59462	The Uncanny X-Men #462	He was assimilated by Sir James Jaspers into a new Fury.
Captain Britannia (Elsbeth Braddock)	Earth-79596	Exiles #97	Mentioned by Cat Pryde.
Sir James Braddock	Otherworld	Captain Britain (vol. 2) #7 (July 1985)	Member of the original Corps, Braddock was sent by Merlyn to Earth-616 shortly after the end of World War II to replace its James Braddock and father a hero. He fathered Jamie, Brian and Betsy Braddock and was a member of the Hellfire Club (London) before he was killed in an explosion.
Alecto	Otherworld	X-Men/Dr. Doom Chaos Engine: Book One (2000)	Formerly the personal guard of Roma at the Starlight Citadel.
Gorka	Otherworld	X-Men/Dr. Doom: Chaos Engine: Book One	He was a personal guard of Roma at the Starlight Citadel.
Merlyn	Otherworld	Captain Britain #1 (October 1976)	Merlyn began safeguarding the total of all universes in existence when he established himself as Omniversal Guardian and founded the Corps. He later went mad and his daughter usurped his position.
Roma	Otherworld	Captain Britain #1 (October 1976)	Founding of the Corps alongside her father Merlyn and Sir James Braddock. Took the position of Omniversal Guardian after her father went mad but was later killed during an attack on the Starlight Citadel.
Saturnyne (Opal Luna Saturnyne)	Earth-9	Mighty World of Marvel #381 (January 1982)	Was the Omniversal Majestrix; overseer of the Captain Britain Corps. Since losing that position she has stayed with the Corps.
Captain U.K. (Linda McQuillan)	Earth-238	Marvel Super Heroes #388 (August 1982)	The sole survivor of Earth-238, Linda was transported to Earth-616 to escape the Fury and eventually helped destroy it. Afterwards, Roma assigned her to Earth-794 (to deal with Opul Lun Sat-Yr-Nin) and later reassigned her to Earth-839.
Captain Angleterre (Paul-Henri Spencer)	Earth-305	Mighty World of Marvel (vol. 2) #13 (1984)	
Captain England (Henric Lockwood)	Earth-522 ("The Hub")	Daredevils #6 (1983)	He is from The Hub, where the trial of Saturnyne took place and often carries a staff.
Captain Albion (Katherine Huggen)	Earth-523	Daredevils #6 (1983)	
Spider-UK (William "Billy" Braddock)	Earth-833	The Amazing Spider-Man (vol. 3) #7	A British version of Spider-Man.
Kommandant Englander (Helga Geering)	Earth-846	Mighty World of Marvel (vol. 2) #13 (1984)	She is from a German dominated world.
Cap'n Saxonia (Frideswide Lawley)	Earth-924	Excalibur #49 (1992)	Also a member of Calibur alongside that dimension's versions of Spider-Girl, Iron Fist, Hulk, and Doctor Strange. She was sometimes known as Captain Saxonia.
Captain Britain (Meggan)	Earth-1189[23]	Excalibur #44 (1991)	Her world was devastated by war between superheroes and villains. She took over the mantle after her version of Braddock died and became part of the Corps.
Captain Cymru (Morwen Powell)	Earth-1282	Excalibur #24 (1990)	One of the few known Captains who uses a gun with Plastrix.
Captain Britain (Kymri)	Earth-1289	Excalibur #16	Never confirmed as official Corps member. She and Lockheed jointly took the mantle of Captain Britain. Her planet was conquered and her people enslaved. She was bound to Kyllian as his personal hound by Tullamore Vogue.
Captain Britain (Lockheed)	Earth-1289	Excalibur #16	Never confirmed as official Corps member. He and Kymri jointly took the mantle of Captain Britain.
Chevalier Bretagne (René de Bragelonne)	Earth-1508	Excalibur #24 (1990)	He wears a purple and green suit similar to a Musketeer.
Captain Britain (Brian Braddock)	Earth-1610	Ultimate X-Men #19 (2002)	Never confirmed as official Corps member. Ultimate Marvel version of character.
Maasai Marion (Sadiki Namuntaya)	Earth-1857	Excalibur #43 (1991)	
Crusader X (Bran Braddock)	Earth-2122	Excalibur #21 (1990)	
Captain Britain (Brian Braddock)	Earth-2149	Marvel Zombies #2 (2006)	Never confirmed as official Corps member. Was infected with the zombie virus by Quicksilver.
Right Honorable Captain Winston Faneshawe-Sinclair	Earth-3208	Excalibur #44 (1991)	
Captain Britain (Brian Braddock)	Earth-3913	Excalibur #44 (1991)	He was accused of murdering a police officer.
Centurion Britannus (Thracius Scipio Magnus)	Earth-4100	Excalibur #24 (1990)	His costume resembles that of the Roman Empire. He invokes Mithras, a god worshiped in both India and Ancient Rome.
Captain Colonies (Stephen Rogers)	Earth-4103	Excalibur #44 (1991)	
Captain Britain (Brian Braddock)	Earth-4400	Exiles #43 (2004)	
Madam Sussex (Francesca Grace)	Earth-4811	Excalibur #44 (1991)	
Major Commonwealth (Byron Falsworth)	Earth-4904	Mighty World of Marvel (vol. 2) #13 (1984)	
Mercian Marsh'al (C'rta M'ller)	Earth-5511	Excalibur #44 (1991)	
Anglo-Simian (Joseph Cornelius)	Earth-5905	Excalibur #44 (1991)	
Skrull Lord: Colony UK7 (Kl'rt)	Earth-6309)	Excalibur #49 (1992)	
Samurai Saxonai (Kendra Matsumoto)	Earth-6315	Excalibur #44 (1991)	
Chieftain Justice (T'Challa)	Earth-6606	Excalibur #44 (1991)	
Centurionous Britainicosarus (Magnus Rex)	Earth-6993	Excalibur #44 (1991)	
Albion (Bran Bardic)	Earth-70518	X-Men: Die By The Sword #5 (2007)	
Will Of The People (John Raven)	Earth-7305	Excalibur #50 (1992)	
Captain Britain (Brian Braddock)	Earth-7475	Alpha Flight #74	Runs the common market, all of Western Europe and North Africa.
Maid Britannia (Guinevere Wren)	Earth-8406	Mighty World of Marvel (vol. 2) #13 (1984)	
Gotowar Konanegg (Kavin Plundarr)	Earth-8413	Mighty World of Marvel (vol. 2) #13 (1984)	
Captain Britain (Brian Braddock)	Earth-8545	Exiles #20	
Lady London (Sybil Sherman)	Earth-9006	Excalibur #24 (1990)	
Captain Britain (Betsy Braddock)	Earth-9012	Excalibur #43 (1991)	
Officer Saxon (Peter Hunter)	Earth-9106	Excalibur #43 (1991)	
Sister Gaia (Serena Foster)	Earth-9111	Excalibur #44 (1991)	
Captain Britain (Brian Braddock)	Earth-9411	Spectacular Spider-Man (UK) #114	
Pookie Pendragon (Kozfran)	Earth-9246	Excalibur #24 (1990)	
Friar Albion (Petros Wisdom)	Earth-9586	Excalibur #44 (1991)	
Caledonia (Alysande Stuart)	Earth-9809	Fantastic Four (vol. 3) #9	She was a prisoner in the Starlight Citadel before becoming Franklin Richards' nanny on Earth-616 as well as a spy for Roma.
Privateer Albion (Jack Turner)	Earth-9890	Excalibur #124 (1998)	
King Britain (Brian Braddock)	Earth-9997	Paradise X: X (2003)	Captain Britain became King of England and resides in the Realm of the Dead.
Agent Albion (Victoria Whitman)	Earth-10221	Excalibur (vol. 2) #1 (2001)	
Captain Britain (Brian Braddock)	Earth-21993	What If? (vol. 2) #46 (1989)	
Rifleman (Lance Hunter)	Earth-22110	Excalibur (vol. 2) #1 (2001)	
Justicer Bull (Cassandra Bull)	Earth-23238	Excalibur #23 (1990)	She is one of the few Captains to have survived the Warpies attack and led the Corps against Jim Jaspers.
Britannic (Brian Braddock)	Earth-28927	Excalibur Annual #2 (1994)	
Captain Britain (Brian Braddock)	Earth-32000	X-Men Unlimited #26 (2000)	
Gizmo (William "Billy" Ransom)	Earth-40121	Excalibur (vol. 2) #1 (2001)	
Percy Penfold	Earth-81289	Excalibur #44 (1991)	
Enforcer Capone (Adolfo Costa)	Earth-89947	Excalibur #44 (1991)	
Britanotron	Earth-91418	Excalibur #43 (1991)	
Captain Britain (Brian Braddock)	Earth-98125	Marvel Vision #25 (1998)	Chose both the Amulet of Life and the Sword of Death.
Britanicus Rex (Brian Braddock)	Earth-99476	Excalibur #51 (1992)	Resided in the dimension also known as Dino-World.

== Other versions ==
=== Marvel 2099 ===
In the unified Marvel 2099 reality of Earth-2099, an unidentified Captain Britain appears as a member of the 2099 version of the New Avengers.

=== Ultimate Universe ===
An original incarnation of Captain Britain appears in the Ultimate Universe imprint. This version is Henri Duggary, a French nobleman, ruler of the European Coalition, and member of the Maker's Council. It is implied that he took the mantle by force and is keen on suppressing Britain's culture and its symbols.

== Collected editions ==
Title	ISBN	Release date	Issues
Captain Britain	9781854000200	17 November 1988	Material from The Mighty World of Marvel (Vol. 2) #14-16 & Captain Britain (Vol. 2) #1-14
Captain Britain	9780785108559	January 2002	X-Men Archives featuring Captain Britain #2-7
Captain Britain Vol. 1 - Birth of a Legend	9781905239306	2 February 2007	Material from Captain Britain (Vol. 1) #1-23
Captain Britain Vol. 2 - A Hero Reborn	9781905239726	28 November 2007	Material from Captain Britain (Vol. 1) #24-39 & Spider-Man & Captain Britain #231-245.
Captain Britain Vol. 3 - The Lion and the Spider	9781846534010	26 March 2009	Material from Spider-Man & Captain Britain #246-53 & Hulk Comic #1 & #3-30
Captain Britain Vol. 4 - Siege of Camelot	9781846534331	16 April 2010	Material from Hulk Comic #42-55 & #57-63 & X-Men Archives featuring Captain Britain #1-6
Captain Britain Vol. 5 - End Game	9780785108559	6 December 2010	Material from X-Men Archives featuring Captain Britain #1-6 & Captain Britain (1988 TPB)
Captain Britain: Legacy of a Legend	9781302906689	23 November 2016	Material from Captain Britain (Vol. 1) #1-2, Marvel Team-Up (Vol. 1) #65-66, Hulk Comic #1, #3-5, #57-59, Marvel Super-Heroes #377-384 & #386, The Daredevils #3-4, The Mighty World Of Marvel #8-12 & Captain Britain (Vol. 2) #14.
