= Magnus (comics) =

Magnus, in comics, may refer to:

- Magnus Lehnsherr, an alternate reality Marvel Comics character; the son of Rogue and Magneto
- Magnus the Sorcerer, a fictional character in the Marvel Universe
- Magnus, Robot Fighter, a comics character created by Russ Manning
- Will Magnus, a scientist character in the DC Comics universe

== See also ==
- Magnus (disambiguation)
- Roberto Raviola, an Italian comic book artist who used Magnus as a pseudonym
