= Jamie Braddock =

- Promotional artwork of Jamie Braddock

Publication information
- Publisher: Marvel Comics
- First appearance: Captain Britain Weekly #9 (Dec. 1976)
- Created by: Chris Claremont; Herb Trimpe

In-story information
- Alter ego: James "Jamie" Braddock Jr.
- Species: Human mutant/Otherworlder hybrid
- Partnerships: Betsy Braddock; Foursaken; Sat-Yr-9
- Abilities: Reality warping; Geokinesis; Power manipulation; Mind control; Matter manipulation; Healing; Transmutation; Teleportation

James Braddock Jr. is a character appearing in American comic books published by Marvel Comics. The elder brother of the twin superheroes Brian and Betsy Braddock, he is a mutant possessing the ability to manipulate reality in a variety of ways. Though his mutant powers are very powerful, he is limited in that he is also a schizophrenic who believes that reality to be his own dream. Originally a supporting character in his brother's solo comic book series, his powers and subsequent mental illness have led him to act as a supervillain at times.

== Publication history ==
Jamie Braddock first appeared in the UK title Captain Britain Weekly #9 (Dec. 1976), and was created by Chris Claremont, Herb Trimpe, and Fred Kida.

== Fictional character biography ==
Jamie is the oldest son of Dr. James and Elisabeth Braddock. Nearly a decade older than his siblings, the twins Brian and Elisabeth ("Betsy"), Jamie had a relatively isolated childhood.

Jamie becomes a financial genius and successful race car driver. He is the head of Braddock Industries, a company that flourishes under his leadership. Eventually, Jamie discovers Brian's secret identity as Captain Britain and assists him on several occasions. In his spare time, Jamie begins making illegal bets and accumulates debt. Soon, he becomes involved with various illegal activities to pay his debts. Starting out with minor crimes, Jamie eventually becomes involved with robbery, murder, and slave-trading in Africa, resulting in him being kidnapped by the scientist Doctor Crocodile. Jamie's treatment at the hands of Doctor Crocodile activates his latent mutant ability to warp reality in his immediate environment. Sat-Yr-9 learns of Jamie's recently emerged powers and hires Technet to free him. However, Jamie easily defeats Technet and transforms Doctor Crocodile into a crocodile before leaving with Sat-Yr-9.

Brian resurrects his sister Betsy one year after she is killed in Spain. Uatu the Watcher also appears inexplicably, implying that something of cosmic significance is about to happen. Jamie mentions a "cosmic threat" known as the Foursaken that has reappeared on Earth. He is pulled through a mysterious portal which the X-Men follow him through. Most of the team is captured, with the exception of Betsy, who was invisible to the Foursaken thanks to Jamie's alterations. During the conflict that follows, Jamie decides that he cannot allow his sister to be used as a pawn again, sacrificing himself to save the universe from the First Fallen, the Foursaken's master.

Jamie appears alive once more, alongside his brother and the Captain Britain Corps defending Otherworld from the forces of a powerful sorcerer called the Goat. He offers to "cleanse" Betsy of the changes made to her mind and body over the course of her time with the X-Men, but she refuses. Though he initially appears to be reformed and cured of his insanity, it is eventually revealed that the Goat is a future incarnation of Jamie intent on consuming the multiverse to achieve godhood. As his power grows, Betsy forces Brian to kill Jamie by breaking his neck, erasing the Goat from existence.

Jamie is resurrected by a group of magicians who become his followers. He begins searching for the Space Gem under Black Widow's care. Using the dark arts, he twists two young boys to track the Gem. When Black Widow confronts him in his hideout, Brian has an asp from the Sixth Dimension inject her with lethal venom. After Black Widow takes out Jamie's followers, she stabs him several times and severs his legs, causing more asps to emerge from his body. With help from Merlin, Black Widow deals with the asps while Jamie dies from his wounds, freeing the children from his control. Black Widow herself is saved from the asp venom by Merlin. Jamie is eventually resurrected on Krakoa by the Five and reunited with Betsy.

== Powers and abilities ==
Jamie Braddock is an omega-level mutant with the ability to manipulate quantum strings to alter the fabric of reality to his whims. Jamie's reality-warping power is immense in scope, limited only by his imagination and fluctuating sanity. He can create portals out of ordinary objects that can transport him across the planet or into other dimensions instantaneously, transform living beings into entirely different forms, grant various superhuman abilities to others (though they tend to fade over time), and can even resurrect the dead, however this particularity apparently can only be used on his own bloodline, as he only demonstrated this ability with his family.
