= Avalon (Marvel Comics) =

Fictional kingdom in Marvel Comics

Otherworld
- Map of Otherworld from Thor & Hercules: Encyclopædia Mythologica #1 (July 2009). Art by Eliot R. Brown.
- First appearance: Fantastic Four #54 (September 1966)
- Created by: Stan Lee; Jack Kirby
- Characters: Captain Britain; Meggan; Merlyn; Roma; Opal Luna Saturnyne; Captain Britain Corps; Leir
- Publisher: Marvel Comics

Avalon, also known as Otherworld, is a fictional dimension appearing in American comic books published by Marvel Comics. It is based on the mythical Avalon from Celtic, Irish, and Welsh mythology.

Avalon first appeared in Fantastic Four #54 (September 1966) by Stan Lee and Jack Kirby. The dimension was first referred to as 'Otherworld' in Captain Britain #1 (October 1976) by Chris Claremont, Herb Trimpe, and Fred Kida.

== General description ==
Avalon is a small other-dimensional planetary body located in a pocket dimension adjacent to Earth. It is formed by the collective subconscious of the inhabitants of the United Kingdom and the Republic of Ireland. Other places within this dimension include Fomor (home of the Fomorians), Annwn (home of the dead), and other locales associated with Celtic mythology. This pocket dimension also contains the Starlight Citadel, home of Roma, and the base of the Captain Britain Corps.

Otherworld is a high fantasy world; gods, elves, dragons, and many other beings live in small towns and large castles with no heavy industry. Sorcery and magic are a part of daily life, though the Captain Britain Corps and Avalon also possess highly advanced technology.

== History ==
Within the fictional historical setting of Avalon, there previously existed many ways to travel from Earth to Avalon and back during ancient times, which were created by the Twelve Walkers. Six of the Twelve Walkers created false paths that would lead travelers to dangerous places or drive them to the point of insanity, which resulted in a backlash from the human inhabitants of Earth against all magical creatures. At this point, many of the magical creatures relocated to Avalon and left most of the paths between Earth and Avalon destroyed, with only a few remaining functional.

=== Merlyn, Roma, and the Starlight Citadel ===
From the Starlight Citadel, Merlyn establishes the Captain Britain Corps, a group of superhuman heroes who patrol the omniverse. Merlyn becomes the Omniversal Guardian, assisted in his task by the Omniversal Majestor/Majestrix. Years later, Mastermind conquers the Starlight Citadel, destroying most of the Captain Britain Corps and disguising himself as Roma. Mastermind intends to claim the Amulet of Right and the Sword of Might, two mystical artifacts which empowered Brian Braddock. However, Braddock finds the artifacts before Mastermind and discovers that he is their rightful heir. Through the use of those artifacts, Braddock defeats Mastermind and is named the ruler of Avalon. Braddock leaves the throne after the events of "House of M" and returns to Earth.

=== The Island of Avalon and the Celtic Gods ===
One of the Celtic gods, the Lady of the Lake, safeguards Excalibur, King Arthur's sword. She becomes a close ally of the Black Knight and gives him Excalibur when he loses his weapon, the Ebony Blade. Years later, the Lady of the Lake gives the Black Knight two more weapons: the Sword of Light and the Shield of Night. Avalon is also the home of the Green Knight, a primordial nature spirit who empowers select warriors as his Pendragons.

=== The Manchester Gods ===
The druid Master Wilson spontaneously materializes in the north of the Otherworld as a personification of the industrialization and urbanization of present-day Britain. Wilson believes that the monarchies who predominated the Otherworld for centuries were unjust for the townsfolk, and that Avalon should urbanize and modernize to more accurately reflect the collective subconscious of present-day Britain. To achieve this, Wilson makes a deal with the fire demon Surtur, who provides him the power to construct massive mechanized cities known as the "Manchester Gods" and wage war on the ruling elite of Avalon. Following a destructive war, Wilson and the Manchester Gods force the leaders of Avalon to sign an armistice and surrender, establishing a democracy. When Surtur attacks Asgard using the technology of the Manchester Gods, Wilson sacrifices himself to stop Surtur.

== Notable inhabitants ==
=== Individuals ===
- Captain Britain and Meggan: After Brian Braddock becomes ruler of Otherworld, he relocates there with Meggan. After Meggan's disappearance during "House of M", Braddock returns to Earth.
- Green Knight: Lord Bercilak de Hautdesert is the Green Knight of unknown origin.
- King Arthur: The ruler of Camelot.
- The Lady of the Lake: A Celtic goddess who lives both on Camelot and on Earth at the same time.
- Merlin: The wizard who was an ally of King Arthur.
- Merlyn: Former Omniversal Guardian who posed as the Merlin of legend.
- Roma: Omniversal Guardian, current leader of Otherworld.
- Opal Luna Saturnyne: Omniversal Majestrix, servant of Roma and former inhabitant of Earth 9.

=== Groups ===
- The Captain Britain Corps is based on Otherworld, though most Captain Britains live on their own Earth and only come to Otherworld for meetings.
- The Celtic Gods reside on the island of Avalon, including Leir.
- The Knights of Pendragon of Marvel Comics were transported together with Camelot to the island of Avalon.

== Other versions ==
In Avataars: Covenant of the Shield, Eurth's Avalon is a kingdom that is ruled by Captain Avalon and protected by the Champions of the Realm.

== See also ==
- Multiverse (Marvel Comics)
