= The Mighty World of Marvel =

Comic book series

- The Mighty World of Marvel #1 published in 1972

Publication information
- Publisher: Marvel UK & Panini Comics
- Schedule: Vol. 1: Weekly (to 329) then monthly Vol. 2: Monthly; Vols. 3–4: Every 4 weeks
- Format: Ongoing series
- Genre: Superhero
- Publication date: October 1972 – May 1983; June 1983 – October 1984; February 2003 – August 2009; October 2010 – November 2019
- No. of issues: Vol 1: 329; Vol 2: 17; Vol 3: 86; Vol 4: 62; Vol 5: 30; Vol 6: 19; Vol 7: 22
- Editor(s): Vol 1: Stan Lee, Tony Isabella, Matt Softly, Neil Tennant, Dez Skinn, Paul Neary; Vol 2: Bernie Jaye, Tim Hampson; Vols. 3–7: Scott Gray

The Mighty World Of Marvel (commonly shortened to MWOM) was a British comic book series published first by Marvel UK and then by Panini Comics. Debuting on 30 September 1972, it was the first title published by Marvel UK and ran until 1984. The series was revived in 2003 by Panini Comics, who are licensed to reprint Marvel US material in Europe, and was published monthly until November 2019.

Spending much of the 1970s as Marvel UK's flagship title, MWOM published black & white reprints of American Marvel four-colour material. Thanks in large part to the success of MWOM, Marvel UK gained a foothold in the (at the time) vast UK weekly comic market, allowing the company to cross-market and later introduce non-superhero UK-reprint titles such as Planet of the Apes and Star Wars.

== Publication history ==
=== Vol. 1 (1972–1983) ===
MWOM started out publishing reprints of 1960s stories featuring Marvel's existing characters — including Spider-Man, The Hulk, and the Fantastic Four. The monthly format of the American material was adapted to fit the British weekly format, with stories being split up over several weeks. As was the custom with British weekly titles, the first issue of MWOM featured a free gift, in this case a Hulk iron-on T-shirt transfer.

After Spider-Man left to star in his own publication, Spider-Man Comics Weekly, replaced by Daredevil in the third strip, who was himself replaced by the original X-Men and then the Avengers. Eventually the title settled with the Hulk as cover star, backed up by Daredevil and the Fantastic Four.

Early during the comic's run a type of fan club, FOOM (Friends Of Ol' Marvel), was started and readers were invited to join and receive exclusive items.

As MWOM passed its hundredth issue (August 31, 1974) a galaxy of different characters began to be featured in the publication (with the Hulk still holding the top spot), many of these coming via the merger of other titles into MWOM. The Avengers returned to MWOM, bringing Conan the Barbarian with them in issue #199 (July 21, 1976) following the cancellation of their own magazine. The Avengers had joint cover billing with the Hulk, and over time the green giant would share it with other characters. From issue #233 (March 1977), the Hulk co-starred with Planet of the Apes (after their own 1974–1977 weekly folded) and subsequently with Dracula and Nick Fury. (The former was left over from the last merger, when the title then called Planet of the Apes and Dracula Lives merged into MWOM; while the latter was from Fury weekly, an unsuccessful March–August 1977 attempt to follow the popularity of boys' war comics in the UK.) The final strip to share the masthead with the Hulk was the Fantastic Four, who returned to MWOM after starring in their own magazine, The Complete Fantastic Four.

==== Marvel Comic ====
The comic changed when in 1978 Dez Skinn was hired by Stan Lee to head Marvel UK. Skinn revamped all of Marvel UK's titles, including The Mighty World of Marvel, changing the title to Marvel Comic at #330 (January 24, 1979). This saw a move towards more traditional UK boys' adventure-type comics as Daredevil was joined (or re-joined) by Dracula, Conan the Barbarian, Shang-Chi, Skull the Slayer, and Godzilla, who replaced the Hulk three issues after the re-launch.

==== Marvel Superheroes ====
In September 1979, however, the title returned to its roots when it became the monthly Marvel Superheroes with issue #353, starring the Avengers. Supporting the Avengers were other superhero teams, initially the original X-Men but later the Champions, while the third and final strip, Superhero Spotlight, featured a new character every few issues. Initially, it ran Ms. Marvel's adventures, which were continued from Marvel Comic. Issue #377 (September 1981) saw the first of a new series of original Captain Britain stories started, continued from the Black Knight strip in Hulk Weekly, which had also featured original material. These stories were written by Dave Thorpe and drawn by Alan Davis. Captain Britain ended with issue #388 (August 1982), just as yet another merger occurred — Rampage joined Marvel Superheroes, and the new X-Men arrived to replace Captain Britain.

Erratic distribution affected sales, and eventually Marvel Superheroes was cancelled in the summer of 1983. Issue #397 ended the continuous run of what was at the time Marvel UK's longest-running title (it was later to be supplanted by Spider-Man weekly, which eventually ran 666 continuous issues).

=== Volume 2 (1983–1984) ===
Shortly afterwards, in June 1983, Mighty World of Marvel was re-launched and re-numbered, again as a monthly. The new series mainly concentrated on reprint material, initially the X-Men (continued from Marvel Superheroes) as well as such American limited series as The Vision and the Scarlet Witch, Wolverine, Cloak and Dagger, and a somewhat out-of-chronology X-Men and the Micronauts, set some years after the recent X-Men series. MWOM vol. 2 also featured the end of Alan Moore and Alan Davis's Jaspers' Warp Captain Britain storyline, after The Daredevils was cancelled and merged with MWOM (from vol. 2, issue #7, December 1983). After Moore left, Alan Davis took over writing duties for the Captain Britain stories, but the strip stopped in issue #16 as the Captain left for his own new monthly title in 1985.

Despite some strong material, the merger of the more adult-orientated The Daredevils with the more mainstream MWOM was not an overriding success, and #17 was MWOM vol. 2's final issue. Issue #17 saw the beginning of the limited series Magick, which was continued in the Marvel UK series Savage Sword of Conan, with which MWOM merged.

=== Volume 3 (2003–2009) ===
The Mighty World of Marvel vol. 3, #38, published in 2006

The title remained in limbo until Panini Comics (which had obtained the Marvel UK license in 1995) began publishing it as a "Marvel Collectors' Edition" in February 2003. The new MWOM featured reprints of American Marvel material from all eras of Marvel history; a typical issue was 76 pages long, with most stories lasting 22 pages.

Initially, the title reprinted a Hulk and a Daredevil story each issue with a revolving guest spot. This format was eventually replaced with three revolving guest spots; generally a full story arc was printed before being replaced by something else, or there was a break in a run (which was often revisited at a later date). In addition to Daredevil and the Hulk, characters featured included She-Hulk, Blade, Ghost Rider, Captain Britain, the Fantastic Four, Nick Fury, and the Defenders. The title also printed many Marvel team-up stories featuring multiple superheroes, from such series as Marvel Team-Up vol. 3, the Contest of Champions II, and Beyond!. MWOM also regularly printed spotlights on the more obscure characters featured. These spotlights were a page long and featured a fictional character biography with pictures and a description of their abilities.

Issue #50 was 100 pages long to celebrate the milestone. It was mentioned in issue #67 that the editors were aiming to get closer to the US chronologically.

Volume 3 ended in August 2009, after 86 issues, following Civil War and Planet Hulk.

=== Volume 4 (2009–2014) ===
The Mighty World of Marvel vol. 4 debuted in September 2009, following the relaunch of all other Collectors' Editions as part of signalling the end of Civil War. Issues #1–#5 featured the World War Hulk storyline. Issue #8 signaled the first tie-in to the Secret Invasion event that runs across all seven of the Panini Collectors' Editions. Mighty World of Marvel printed tie-ins from Captain Britain and MI13, Hercules, The Thunderbolts, and Ms. Marvel.

Volume 4 ended in June 2014 with issue 62.

=== Volume 5 (2014–2016) ===
The Mighty World of Marvel vol. 5 was launched in July 2014 to tie-in with the arrival of Marvel Now! branded stories in the UK. The initial line-up includes Guardians of the Galaxy to tie-in with their film. Avengers Arena was also in the initial lineup. The main storyline for Original Sin was also featured. Mighty World of Marvel also reprinted Silver Surfer and Agents of S.H.I.E.L.D. along with Daredevil.

Volume 5 ended in September 2016 with issue #30.

=== Volume 6 (2016–2018) ===
The Mighty World of Marvel vol. 6 was launched in October 2016. The initial line was Doctor Strange, Ms. Marvel and Black Widow followed by Silver Surfer and Guardians of the Galaxy. Later issues featured Ms. Marvel & Nick Fury's Civil War II stories. The following is a summary of characters featured in this volume:

- issues #1 - #6: Doctor Strange, Ms. Marvel, Black Widow
- issue #7: Guardians of the Galaxy, Silver Surfer, Doctor Strange
- issue #8: Guardians of the Galaxy, Silver Surfer, Tales of The Pet Avengers
- issue #9: Guardians of the Galaxy, Silver Surfer, Ms. Marvel
- issues #10 - #11: Guardians of the Galaxy, Silver Surfer, Ms. Marvel, Nick Fury
- issues #12 - #13: Guardians of the Galaxy: Mother Entropy, Ms. Marvel, Nick Fury
- issue #14: Champions, Guardians of the Galaxy: Mother Entropy, Black Widow, Marvel 75th Anniversary (Captain America), Nick Fury
- issues #15 - #17: Champions, All-New Guardians of the Galaxy, Black Widow
- issues #18 - #19: Black Panther, Champions, All-New Guardians of the Galaxy, Black Widow, Doctor Strange

=== Volume 7 (2018–2019) ===
This volume started publication in April 2018 — appearing every 28 days — and ended in November 2019 with issue 22. Panini had planned to relaunch it. Volume eight was to star 'The Immortal Hulk', and issue 1 was advertised, but ultimately the end of volume 7 was also the end of the title.

Issue 1: 100-PAGE-SPECIAL!

- Silver Surfer Vol. 8 #9
- Black Panther Vol. 4 #3
- Champions Vol. 2 #6
- New Avengers Annual #1
- Strange Tales #118
- Release: 5 April 2018

Issue 2:

- Silver Surfer Vol. 8 #10
- Black Panther Vol. 4 #4
- Champions Vol. 2 #7
- Strange Tales #119
- Release: 3 May 2018

Issue 3:

- Silver Surfer Vol. 8 #11
- Black Panther Vol. 4 #5
- Champions Vol. 2 #8
- Strange Tales #120
- FREE MARVEL TRADING CARDS!
- Release: 31 May 2018

Issue 4:

- Silver Surfer Vol. 8 #12
- Black Panther Vol. 4 #6
- Champions Vol. 2 #9
- Strange Tales #121
- FREE MARVEL TRADING CARDS!
- Release: 28 June 2018

Issue 5

- 100-PAGE-SPECIAL!
- Secret Empire begins!
- The Guardians of the Galaxy return in an all-new adventure!
- Silver Surfer!
- Champions in Secret Empire!
- Classic Action with Doctor Strange!
- FREE MARVEL TRADING CARDS!

Issues #5-6 were part of the Secret Empire event and feature Champions vol. 2, #s 10-11.
