= Roma (comics) =

- Uncanny X-Men #462, art by Alan Davis.

Publication information
- Publisher: Marvel Comics
- First appearance: Captain Britain #1 (October 1976)
- Created by: Chris Claremont; Herb Trimpe; Fred Kida

In-story information
- Species: Human
- Team affiliations: Superior to the Captain Britain Corps
- Notable aliases: Lady of the Northern Skies, the Goddess of the Northern Skies
- Abilities: Immortality; Mystic powers Energy manipulation

Roma is a fictional character appearing in American comic books published by Marvel Comics. She is the daughter of Merlyn. Roma is the Omniversal Guardian, charged with the safety of the Omniverse. She is assisted in her task by Saturnyne (the Omniversal Majestrix), and the Captain Britain Corps.

== Publication history ==
Roma first appeared in Marvel UK's Captain Britain, in the first issue in October 1976, and subsequently appeared in the second volume of Captain Britain's series. The second volume was reprinted in the U.S. in the Captain Britain trade paperback.

In 1978, Chris Claremont introduced Captain Britain to an international audience, fully integrating him into the Marvel Universe via a story that starred Captain Britain and Spider-Man, with Roma in a small role. Initially published as a black & white story in the UK's Super Spider-Man & Captain Britain comic, this was then coloured and reprinted in an American title, Marvel's long-running Marvel Team-Up series, issue #65.

== Fictional character biography ==
=== Captain Britain ===
Brian Braddock, a research assistant at the Darkmoor Research Centre nuclear complex, is attacked by Joshua Stragg (the Reaver), who chases him over a cliff. Roma, then calling herself "the Lady of the Northern Skies", appears to Braddock, along with Merlyn, and offers him the chance to become a hero. Roma offers Braddock a choice of weapons: the Sword of Might or the Amulet of Right. He chooses the Amulet, earning Roma's gifts.

Roma and her father exist in a dimension called Otherworld and operate out of Roma's Starlight Citadel. When a battle with Lord Hawk leaves Captain Britain in a coma, his spirit meets them in this dimension.

Roma gves Captain Britain great physical strength and a quarterstaff that could be used for direct attack or emit a protective force field. Merlyn eventually replaces the staff with Captain Britain's Star Scepter.

Believing that Merlyn has died, Roma takes his place as the Omniversal Guardian and ruler of Otherworld. In fact, Merlyn had faked his death so he could manipulate events while being safe from his enemies.

=== X-Men/Siege Perilous ===
Roma appears in human form while reaching out to Colossus, who is recovering from his battle with the Marauders shortly after the events of "Mutant Massacre". Roma approaches him and asks him to draw a sketch of her; she offers to pay him by telling him his fortune. When Colossus finishes his sketch, Roma hints at things that would happen in the X-Men's future, but remains vague enough to anger him. She disappears from the scene, leaving behind a figurine of Colossus in his steel form.

Roma is held captive in her Starlight Citadel by the Adversary, a deity who plans on destroying and remaking the Earth. The X-Men sacrifice themselves to stop the Adversary and trap him in a portal. However, Roma retrieves the X-Men's souls and resurrects them.

Roma also entrusts the X-Men with a mystical portal called the Siege Perilous. Those who walk through the portal have their lives and deeds judged on a cosmic scale and are eventually reborn if they are deemed worthy.

=== Excalibur ===
One of the X-Men who died in the battle against the Adversary is Psylocke, Captain Britain's sister. Captain Britain's grief unites him his girlfriend Meggan with the surviving X-Men Shadowcat and Nightcrawler, who form Excalibur. To keep the individualistic Captain Britain a part of Excalibur, Roma places a jinx on him that causes him to make mistakes and fail whenever he tried to act independently of the team. Roma had foreseen that Excalibur would become essential to the safety of the multiverse; only a group with their specific talents could stop an unknown threat.

Roma eventually discovers that Merlyn is still alive. Merlyn, in disguise, manipulates Captain Britain into confronting Roma. She removes the jinx she had placed on him and tells him about the secret threat. Excalibur encounters the threat shortly afterwards: Necrom, Merlyn's teacher, who had been planning for millennia to use the Phoenix Force to increase his own power. Roma persuades Excalibur to destroy Merlyn's tower in the multiversal energy matrix, but prevents Merlyn from killing Excalibur. The combined powers of Excalibur defeat Necrom as Merlyn had planned. Roma told Excalibur that from now on, they would be free to determine their own destiny.

Roma is captured and impersonated by the villain Mastermind, who plans to use the Sword of Might and the Amulet of Right to reshape the Omniverse. Mastermind is defeated by Captain Britain and his allies. Captain Britain begins using both the Sword and the Amulet and is given Roma's position as the leader of Otherworld, though Roma retains her role as the omniverse's guardian.

=== Fantastic Four/Franklin Richards ===
Roma is attacked by the cosmic entity Abraxas while he is seeking the Ultimate Nullifier. She summons Valeria Richards and Franklin Richards to protect them from Abraxas, but is ultimately killed. Franklin reveals that Roma had taught him for an unknown period of time and that Valeria and himself would be needed in resurrecting Galactus. They use up all their powers to resurrect Galactus and end the threat of Abraxas. In the process, Roma is resurrected.

=== The Floating Kingdom ===
As the result of a deal she made with Saturnyne in the future Otherworld province Blightspoke, Roma loses her position as ruler. They agreed that she would rebuild Otherworld with the Mapmakers' power and become Omniversal Magestrix in exchange for making the Fair Courts for her to rule and the Foul Courts for her father to rule, allowing her to finally achieve power outside her father's control.

When Merlyn unites most of the nations together and invades the Starlight Citadel, Saturnyne and her allies are forced into hiding. The floating kingdom of Roma Regina, one of the only parts of Otherworld not under Merlyn's control, becomes a refuge for mutants who are being hunted down by Furies. Roma brings together ten specific mutants to help stop her father, declaring them the "Knights of X" and sending them to find the Siege Perilous.

== Powers and abilities ==
Roma is the youngest member of the extra-dimensional race of Otherworld, but still millennia old and immortal. She has been highly trained in the mystical arts, with an extensive knowledge of sorcery rivaling that of her father Merlyn. She has extraordinary prowess in manipulating the vast magical powers at her disposal, which she can use in countless ways, including interdimensional teleportation, astral projection, healing, mind-reading, and energy manipulation. As the Omniversal Guardian she also has access to the technology and power of Otherworld, which has devices capable of destroying complete universes. The Captain Britain Corps obeys her commands.
