= Brian Braddock =

Marvel Comics fictional character

- Brian Braddock as Captain Avalon in Excalibur (vol. 4) #13. Art by R.B. Silva.

Publication information
- Publisher: Marvel Comics
- First appearance: As Captain Britain: Captain Britain #1 (Oct. 1976); As Britanic: Excalibur #75 (Mar. 1994); As Captain Avalon: Excalibur (vol. 4) #13 (Oct. 2020)
- Created by: Chris Claremont (writer); Herb Trimpe (artist)

In-story information
- Species: Human mutate/Otherworlder hybrid
- Team affiliations: Secret Avengers; MI-13; Excalibur; Captain Britain Corps; Knights of Pendragon; Hellfire Club; New Excalibur; Illuminati; Champions of Europe; Empire State University; Swordbearers of Krakoa
- Notable aliases: Captain Britain; Britanic; Captain Avalon
- Abilities: Superhuman strength, speed, endurance, agility, durability, reflexes, and senses; Force fields; Energy beams; Flight; Genius-level intellect

Brian Braddock is a superhero appearing in British and American comic books published by Marvel Comics. Created in 1976 by writer Chris Claremont and artist Herb Trimpe, with later contributions from Alan Moore and Alan Davis, he first appeared in Captain Britain Weekly #1. He is the first character in publication to use the Captain Britain moniker, later adopting the title Captain Avalon.

As Captain Britain, Brian was empowered by the legendary wizard Merlyn and his daughter Roma and assigned to be the champion of the British Isles and its peoples, as well as the defender of Earth-616 as a member of the multiversal Captain Britain Corps. Following his corruption by Morgan le Fay, his twin sister Betsy reclaimed the mantle of Captain Britain, with Brian taking up the moniker Captain Avalon as defender of Avalon.

== Publication history ==
Captain Britain debuted in the first issue of Captain Britain Weekly (cover-dated the week ending 13 October 1976), an anthology comic published exclusively in the United Kingdom by the Marvel Comics imprint known as Marvel UK. The comic represented the first original content published by Marvel UK, who had previously only handled reprints of Marvel Comics' U.S. publications. However, the new content was still created by Marvel's American staff (the initial team being London-born writer Chris Claremont, penciller Herb Trimpe, and inker Fred Kida) under the supervision of U.S. editor Larry Lieber, then shipped to the UK for publication. (In addition, the new 8-page Captain Britain installments in each issue of Captain Britain Weekly were supplemented by more reprinted material, featuring Nick Fury and the Fantastic Four).

The character's creators are unknown, though Trimpe has remarked that the visual design looks like the work of John Romita, Sr., who was designing many of Marvel's characters at the time.

The first two issues of the comic were also bundled with "free gifts", a cardboard Captain Britain mask in the first issue and a Captain Britain boomerang in the second, such novelties being a tradition with British comic book launches. Chris Claremont left the series after ten issues, midway through the "Doctor Synne" storyline, due to creative differences with the editor. Trimpe recalled that Claremont and his replacement, Gary Friedrich, while "miles apart in personality and approach to a story", were both flexible writers who allowed him considerable free rein in laying out and pacing the stories.

With sales slowly declining, Captain Britain went to black-and-white with issue #24 (23 March 1977) and was cancelled entirely with issue #39 (6 July 1977), though the Captain Britain serial was immediately transferred to Marvel UK's Spider-Man comic, which was then retitled Super Spider-Man & Captain Britain. In 1978, Chris Claremont and John Byrne introduced Captain Britain to an American audience for the first time with Marvel Team-Up #65-66. The Marvel Team-Up story was reprinted as the last six installments of the UK serial, ending with Super Spider-Man & Captain Britain #253. This marked the end of Captain Britain's exploits until March 1979, when Captain Britain appeared with the Black Knight in the "Otherworld Saga" which ran in Hulk Comic. These guest appearances were the first time Captain Britain was written and drawn by British creators.

The character was relaunched, in a redesigned costume, in the Marvel Superheroes anthology title, starting with issue #377 (September 1981). The relaunch was written by Dave Thorpe and illustrated by Alan Davis, who redesigned the costume at editor-in-chief Paul Neary's behest. Neary's chief concern was the original costume's lion chest emblem; though the emblem is a heraldic symbol, it is better known in the UK as a sign to denote the quality and freshness of eggs. Davis noted that his depiction of Brian Braddock was visually based on Garth, "an exaggerated Greek god, perfect in every way" and that:

I decided to base his costume on military uniforms. If you've ever seen the mounted guards outside Buckingham Place, you'll recognise the components. The white leggings and the tall boots with the flaps over the knees were easy. The headgear took a bit more time because I wanted it to look like a helmet rather than a mask. The stripes across his chest started as two crossed sashes and underwent numerous changes.

The political commentaries in Thorpe's stories ignited conflicts with the editors, leading to his being replaced by Alan Moore with Marvel Superheroes #387 (July 1982). Moore used Thorpe's stories as a springboard for the "Jaspers' Warp" storyline. Captain Britain appeared as one of the characters in Marvel US's 1982 Contest of Champions limited series, albeit wearing his already-discarded original costume.

After Marvel Superheroes #388 (August 1982), the series moved into a new monthly comic, The Daredevils. When The Daredevils was canceled after eleven issues, Captain Britain was continued in The Mighty World of Marvel volume 2 #7 (December 1983). After the run of Alan Moore, who left because of a dispute over unpaid invoices, the serial continued for a few more issues with different writers (Steve Craddock, Alan Davis, and Mike Collins) before moving to the new Captain Britain Monthly. Jamie Delano took over writing duties with the first issue (cover-dated January 1985) on the recommendation of Moore and with the agreement of Davis. However, Davis later said "Initially I gave plot ideas to Jamie [Delano] but I was never happy with the direction he wanted to take things so I took more and more control until I eventually took over as writer."

In the meantime, Captain Britain's long absence from American comics ended with a series of 1985 guest appearances, starting with Captain America #305-306. Following the cancellation of Captain Britain's solo series, Claremont and Davis created the one-shot special Excalibur: The Sword is Drawn (December 1987), which served to launch the American monthly Excalibur in 1988, featuring an eponymous team which included Captain Britain. Marvel UK incorporated Captain Britain as the main attraction of their own group series, Knights of Pendragon, which initially met with positive critical response and strong sales, but declined to the point of cancellation with issue #18.

New Excalibur was introduced in 2005, with Captain Britain as team leader. This series ran until issue #24 and the team was disbanded in the X-Men: Die by the Sword limited series. In 2008, using the Secret Invasion crossover storyline as a launchpad, Brian was featured as the protagonist of Captain Britain and MI: 13, written by Paul Cornell, which included some characters from New Excalibur, as well as members of MI: 13 who appeared in Cornell's Wisdom limited series.

Panini Comics bought Marvel UK and in 2006 renewed and broadened their licence with Marvel which allows them to produce original comic stories for the British and European markets. This has included Captain Britain's first original appearance in UK comics in thirteen years, with a story that ran in Spectacular Spider-Man Adventures and Panini plan to have more in their new all-ages title Marvel Heroes.

Captain Britain made several cameo appearances in Marvel Comics publications then would feature in a Heroic Age tie in anthology limited series and a Deadpool Team Up issue.. He appeared as a regular character in the 2010-2013 Secret Avengers series, from issue #22 (April 2012) through its final issue #37 (March 2013). Beginning in November 2014, Captain Britain reappeared with the Avengers as a part of the Time Runs Out storyline.

Following the 2019 X-Men franchise relaunch Dawn of X, Betsy Braddock became the new Captain Britain following Brian's corruption by Morgan le Fay, with Brian taking up the new mantle of Captain Avalon.

== Fictional character biography ==
=== Origins ===
Born and raised in the small town of Maldon, Essex and educated at Fettes College in Edinburgh, Brian was a shy and studious youth, living a relatively quiet life and spending a lot of time with his parents and siblings (older brother Jamie and fraternal twin Betsy). The family was an aristocratic one that was no longer rich enough to fraternise with their former academic peers, leaving Brian (too proud to fraternise with lower classes) a lonely child who immersed himself in the study of physics.

After the death of his parents (Sir James and Lady Elizabeth) in what seemed to be a laboratory accident, Brian takes a fellowship at Darkmoor nuclear research centre. When the facility is attacked by the technological criminal Joshua Stragg (alias "The Reaver"), Brian tries to find help by escaping on his motorcycle. Although he crashes his bike in a nearly fatal accident, Merlyn and his daughter, the Omniversal Guardian Roma, appear to the badly injured Brian. They give him the chance to be the superhero Captain Britain. He is offered a choice: the Amulet of Right or the Sword of Might. Considering himself to be no warrior and unsuited for the challenge, he rejects the Sword and chooses the Amulet. This choice transforms Brian Braddock into Captain Britain.

It is later revealed that Braddock is only one member of a much larger, inter-dimensional corps of mystical protectors. Every Earth in Marvel Comics' Multiverse has its own Captain Britain who is expected to defend that version of Britain and uphold its local laws. They are collectively called the Captain Britain Corps. Captain Britain protects "Earth-616" of the Marvel Universe. Later still, it was retconned that Brian's father, Sir James Braddock, was himself from Otherworld and a member of an earlier Corps; Merlyn had sent him to Earth-616 to take a carefully chosen mate and father a hero who would be far greater even than he (other comics still have the Braddock family as old and established: they've been in the Hellfire Club for generations and Braddock Manor is a "quarter millennium" old in its first appearance).

=== Early career as Captain Britain ===
As his career as a superhero begins, Brian fights as the champion of Great Britain, often clashing with S.T.R.I.K.E. and Welsh anti-superhero police officer Dai Thomas, and would develop a rogues gallery including the assassin Slaymaster and the crime matriarch Vixen. He tried to keep his studies going and court fellow student Courtney Ross while also working as a superhero, and (as with other Marvel heroes) was viewed as a coward by others because he always vanished whenever trouble started. (Note: Both times with supporting character Jacko Tanner.)

During one episode, his siblings Betsy and Jamie became aware of his secret identity after he saved them from Dr. Synne, a villain terrorizing the land around Braddock Manor. Synne turned out to be the patsy of the sentient computer Mastermind, a device Brian's father had created; it was then Brian learned that his parents did not die in an accident but had been deliberately killed by the machine.

Brian's greatest achievement in this time was preventing a neo-Nazi takeover of the country with the aid of Captain America, Nick Fury, and S.T.R.I.K.E. commander Lance Hunter. He was responsible for both saving Prime Minister Jim Callaghan from the Red Skull and from stopping the Skull's germ bomb from killing London. The Nazis' first strike had actually happened during the battle with Mastermind, when the Red Skull took the plans for the computer and had Braddock Manor bombed to rubble (a later retcon said Mastermind had created a hologram that was bombed instead); Captain Britain was briefly believed dead and an empty coffin was laid in state at St Paul's Cathedral.

As time goes on, Brian begins fighting more supernatural enemies rather than regular supervillains: this was part of Merlin's overall plan to mentally prepare him for Jaspers’ Warp.

Soon afterwards, Brian travels to America to study. By a strange twist of fate, he rooms with Peter Parker (the hero Spider-Man) at Empire State University. A brief misunderstanding caused Brian to battle Spider-Man, before the two of them were captured by the assassin Arcade. They then tackled various challenges in Murderworld, rescued Brian's love interest Courtney who was kidnapped and placed in a sealed cocoon with limited air, and became the first victims to survive Murderworld. Near the end of this stay, homesickness and stress saw him drink heavily. He stopped after, when drunk and embarrassed by a defeat, he beat a supervillain so badly she was put in hospital; ashamed, Brian paid for her hospital bills and therapy.

On a flight home from America, he came under mental attack by the demonic Necromon, causing Brian to leap out of the plane; he spent two years as a hermit on the Cornish coast, repairing his psyche. He was eventually called to Merlyn's service again, fighting alongside the Black Knight and the elf Jackdaw to defend Otherworld from Necromon. With his memories partially restored Brian and the Knight, allied with Vortigen the Proud Walker, battled Mordred. Both the Black Knight and Captain Britain were snatched out of time to join the Grandmaster's Contest of Champions, where Captain Britain fought against the Arabian Knight, but they were soon returned to resume their quest. At the entrance to Otherworld, Brian was slain by the spectral White Rider, and his corpse claimed by Mandrac: Nethergod Lord of the Slain and the Rider's master, though Merlyn and the Knight swiftly recovered it. Merlyn reunited Captain Britain's departed spirit with his body, resurrecting him. While the hero healed, Merlyn restored his remaining memories and informed him of the Nethergod's involvement with his early foes. Now recalling the location of King Arthur's body, the Black Knight, Captain Britain, and Jackdaw were sent to awaken the King. Succeeding in this quest, Arthur then sent Brian and Jackdaw magically away through the dimensions, stating Brian had a destiny to fulfill elsewhere. As a reward, he and Jackdaw were sent back to Earth.

=== Jaspers' Warp ===
With Necromon defeated, Merlyn merges the powers of the Amulet of Right and the Star Scepter into a uniform to be worn by Braddock. Captain Britain is sent with Jackdaw to Earth-238, a dictatorship run by the British National Party, whose rule was enforced by the Status Crew, where he works with the extra-dimensional Saturnyne to jump-start the reality's development.

Braddock witnesses both this Earth's descent into madness at the hands of Mad Jim Jaspers and Jackdaw's death, while he himself is murdered by the monstrous Fury before being resurrected back on Earth-616. This turns out to have been a deliberate plan by Merlyn to prepare him for the battle against the Jim Jaspers of Earth-616, a far more powerful being. Merlyn, who had previously resurrected Jackdaw, avoids doing so a second time to increase his chances of successfully reviving Captain Britain.

Brian would find himself saving his sister Betsy and the former Psi-Division of S.T.R.I.K.E. from his old enemy Slaymaster. He is also drafted by the mercenary group the Special Executive to save Saturnyne from a show trial, during which he witnessed the destruction of Earth-238's reality to prevent the Jaspers' Warp there from spreading out across the multiverse. He also encountered members of the pan-dimensional Captain Britain Corps, an organization of Captain Britains from various dimensions. However, he and his assembled allies were unable to prevent Earth-616's Jim Jaspers from expanding his influence over Earth, and though Brian fought bravely it fell to the Fury to kill the villain - Roma is of the opinion Merlyn intended all along for Brian to lead the Fury to Earth-616 to do this, but this was unconfirmed. Captain Britain also valiantly fights against the Fury, but although he comes close, is unable to best it. Now close to being killed by the Fury, Captain Britain is saved by Captain UK, a member of the Captain Britain Corps and on whose world the Fury killed all superheroes, including Captain UK's husband. Just as the Fury is about to land the killing blow on Captain Britain, Captain UK attacks it in a primal rage, tearing the Fury apart with her bare hands.

=== Post-Warp and replacement ===
Following this and battles against conventional villains the Crazy Gang, Slaymaster, and Vixen, Braddock was captured by Gatecrasher's Technet on behalf of Sat-Yr-9, and then fought his interdimensional counterpart Kaptain Briton. Brian is captured by Modred the Mystic, and teams with Captain America to defeat Modred. He also got caught up in the affairs of intelligence agency R.C.X., the British government's replacement for S.T.R.I.K.E. He also met his future lover Meggan.

Due to the pressures put on him after the Warp, Braddock travels abroad for a while. R.C.X. recruits his sister Betsy to become Captain Britain while he is overseas, angering Brian enough to make him quit when he learns this upon his return. She manages in the role for a while, but unfortunately she proves no match for Slaymaster, who tears out her eyes. Aware of his twin's pain through their telepathic bond, Brian rushes back to fight Slaymaster, whom he eventually kills. After this episode, Brian resumes the mantle of Captain Britain. In real-world terms, these events took place over twelve pages across two issues, though more than five months pass for the characters while Betsy is Captain Britain. Their effect on Betsy, and her future with the X-Men, was profound.

=== Excalibur ===
When the X-Men appeared to perish in Dallas (see Fall of the Mutants), a group of heroes including Nightcrawler, Shadowcat, Phoenix, and Meggan joined Brian to form Excalibur - Great Britain's premier super-team - in an effort to continue the work of the X-Men. Excalibur fought Gatecrasher's Technet in their first meeting together.

Brian was soon reunited with Courtney Ross. He then first battled the Juggernaut. He clashed with old foes Arcade, and the Crazy Gang, and was caused to temporarily switch bodies with the Crazy Gang's Tweedledope. Brian also encountered and fought his other-dimensional Nazi counterpart Hauptmann Englande. With Excalibur, he battled Arcade's "Loonies". With Excalibur, he battled Thor, believing Thor to be Juggernaut due to Loki's magic. Brian then journeyed with Thor into a dimension ruled by Juggernaut.

During this period, Braddock teamed up with police inspector Dai Thomas and journalist Kate McClellan to investigate a series of grisly murders that are finally revealed to be the work of mythical creature the Green Knight. During this story, Braddock was implied to share a strong mystical connection between Braddock and Sir Lancelot.

Brian quits costumed adventuring for a time and concentrates on research, building the Midnight Runner for Excalibur. Eventually, he and Meggan become engaged. However, Brian, Meggan, and the rest of Excalibur are soon captured by the R.C.X. and Brian is severely beaten while resisting. Dying, broken and bloody, he is healed by Roma, who fixes the arcane circuitry in his costume to match his body's frequencies. She also removes the "blunder factor" she had secretly cast over him (a curse she had cast ensuring that he would need the help of the entire team until he saw the innate value in it). The evil members of R.C.X. are cleared out in a joint effort by Excalibur and the members of an internal mutiny.

Immediately afterward, Phoenix reappears and Excalibur journeys into the future to save the world from the Sentinels. On the way back, Brian is lost in the time-stream. Eventually, his body parts start reappearing in the same space as Rachel's - first his arms, then his chest - for brief flickers. Eventually, a rift is opened in which Brian and Rachel switch places. Rachel is flung to the far future to become the Mother Askani and Brian returns home. He is flooded, however, with memories of the far future and remains disconnected from the real world. He calls himself "Britanic" for some time, but eventually re-acclimates himself to his old life. It changes slightly, as Excalibur moves to Muir Island and new members join the team. Brian has a prophetic vision concerning the London Branch of the Hellfire Club's plan to take over the United Kingdom. Brian infiltrates the club by claiming his father's position as Black Rook and, again with Excalibur's help, thwarts its efforts at domination.

In a battle with the Dragons of the Crimson Dawn, Brian expends all of his power to stop a dimensional portal from opening. Having lost his powers, he leaves the team for some time, but returns to fulfill his dream of marrying Meggan. After the ceremony on Otherworld, the team disbands and its members return to the United States.

Brian soon finds work at the Darkmoor research facility. During one of his tests on the new blade and armor of his friend the Black Knight, Widget appears with warriors who begin to attack on Roma's behalf. The heroes (including his sister Betsy, who is also visiting England) drive the attackers off, then follow them to Otherworld where they discover that the Captain Britain Corps has been decimated. Together with the survivors - Crusader X and Captain UK - Brian and his comrades attempt to stop Roma from acquiring the Sword of Might. This, together with the Amulet of Right, would have the ability to remake the cosmos. Brian searches for the Sword but finds a computer-filled shrine in a cavern built by his father. A hologram of James Braddock, Sr. explains to Brian that he is the savior and rightful heir of Otherworld with the innate right to wield Excalibur. The hologram re-activates Brian's powers and as he draws the sword, a fiery cross (similar to the British flag) appears as a mask on his face. Brian then confronts Roma, who is revealed to be his father's sentient and insane computer Mastermind. With the aid of the real Roma, Braddock defeats the powerful computer. Roma then relinquishes control of Otherworld to Captain Britain. He and Meggan remain in Otherworld as effective rulers of the multiverse. Unbeknownst to Brian, the events leading up to his assumption of the Otherworld were orchestrated by Kang the Conqueror, for reasons yet to be revealed.

In the "Lionheart of Avalon" storyline in The Avengers, the sorceress Morgan Le Fay captures Brian and Meggan. Le Fay hopes that by killing Braddock and severing his mystical ties to the land, she will destroy all of Great Britain. However, Brian appears to Kelsey Leigh, a British mother who dies protecting both her children and Captain America from the Wrecking Crew. Braddock offers her the choice between the Amulet and the Sword and, feeling that she could better defend her children with a weapon, she chooses the latter. Although she is changed into a new Captain Britain, she remains cursed by the inability to ever reveal herself to her children. Because he transfers his power to Kelsey, the plan to destroy Britain fails.

=== New Excalibur ===
Returning to Otherworld, Braddock and Meggan become rulers of the realm. However, Captain Britain is forced to come back to Earth to stop the House of M reality-shift from destroying all dimensions. During this time, his wife Meggan apparently sacrifices her life to close a rip in time that would have destroyed all existence. This results in Brian becoming active as Captain Britain again and the formation of a new Excalibur, along with Peter Wisdom, Sage, Juggernaut, Dazzler, and Nocturne. Captain Britain also believes his sister Betsy to be dead, unaware that she has joined the Exiles.

He also assisted Pete Wisdom and British intelligence agency MI-13 in their battle against a Martian invasion.

After the defeat of Albion by New Excalibur, Braddock is reunited with his sister and the Exiles in the miniseries X-Men: Die by the Sword before he is severely injured by Rouge-Mort.

=== Captain Britain and MI: 13 ===
A new series, written by Paul Cornell and drawn by Leonard Kirk, features Captain Britain, Pete Wisdom, and other British superheroes working for MI: 13. The series opened with a Skrull onslaught on Britain, part of the "Secret Invasion" storyline, that saw every British hero drafted into MI:13.

After fighting Skrull forces in London, Brian was dispatched with Pete Wisdom, John the Skrull, and Spitfire to the Siege Perilous (a gateway to the Otherworld) to secure Avalon and thus the world's magic from Skrull conquest. Brian is left uncomfortable by having to kill Skrulls and being separated from the Corps, and simply desires to represent his country (believing, despite Wisdom's statements to the contrary, that he stopped doing so). When the Skrulls shot a missile at the Siege to destroy Earth's access to magic, he attempted to divert it and was killed in a vicious explosion - every inhabitant of the United Kingdom became instantly aware of his death.

Captain Britain was once again resurrected by Merlin in the center of Britain, and after taking possession of the sword Excalibur, confronted the Skrulls in London; his resurrected form is stated by Merlin to be no longer plagued with doubts and a unified symbol of the United Kingdom, "like their flag, one thing that contains many!". He has increased powers and theoretically has no limits, but this is reliant on his level of confidence - he can just as easily become weak and vulnerable. While he has chosen to work with MI:13 and their superhero team, he has stated that the superheroes will no longer kill.

In battle against Doctor Plokta, creator of the Mindless Ones, he was temporarily trapped in Plokta's "Dream Corridor" - a magical construct trapping you in your heart's desire - where he briefly believed he had found Meggan again. He got free and defeated Plokta by forcing him into his own Corridor (presented as a supremely powerful act), but was left unaware that the real Meggan had tried to make contact and was now stuck in Hell. Later, however, during a conflict with Dracula, Doctor Doom gives Meggan to Dracula to use as a bargaining chip. After Captain Britain and MI13 defeat Dracula, Meggan and Captain Britain are reunited.

=== Avengers tenure and Revolutionary War ===
During an international meeting between Steve Rogers and MI13, Captain Britain was offered a job with the Avengers. Captain Britain accepted despite mixed reactions from his MI13 teammates.

He then disappeared from view to fight a war in Otherworld against the demonic Goat, who had attempted to subjugate the multiverse. His brother Jamie, now cured of madness, was a key ally and Brian tried to cajole Betsy into joining as well. Relations with his sister deteriorated as the Corps tried to put her teammate Fantomex on trial for murdering a young Apocalypse, arguing that it was still a crime to kill a child for what they may become. Ironically, in the end it turned out the Goat was a future version of Jamie who had been turned evil and Betsy, who had been forced to sacrifice her emotions to win in battle, stopped the villain by killing the contemporary Jamie; she then berated Brian for leaving the choice to her. He was left bitter by the loss and estranged from his sister.

Later, he becomes one of the new members of the Secret Avengers. He left when the team disbanded after a battle with a race of robotic beings known as the Descendants. Relations were salvaged with Betsy after X-Force was disbanded and she admitted he had been right to try to convict Fantomex for murder, while he admitted that it had been a testament to character that Fantomex had ever been able to fight off his murderous Sentinel urges. He is later seen as the head of the Braddock Academy (the British answer to the Avengers Academy), running it alongside Meggan, Spitfire, Union Jack, and Elsa Bloodstone. One of the students is a young alternate version of himself, Kid Briton.

At an unspecified time, Captain Britain and an army of British heroes defeated Mys-Tech in battle; the agency came close to sending all of Britain to hell to pay off their debts to Mephisto. Following the battle, S.H.I.E.L.D. was secretly called in to clean up the remains of Mys-Tech's bases and technology as MI-13 didn't have the resources to do it. Brian was made a member of S.H.I.E.L.D.'s European Division. Years later, Pete Wisdom learned about this and sarcastically remarked he was proud that Brian was acting like him.

Brian, MI-13, and S.H.I.E.L.D. began investigating a suspected return of Mys-Tech but he was swiftly beaten down and captured by Death's Head II. This was actually a ruse by Death's Head II to plant a tracking device and find out why the Psycho-Wraiths wanted the captain (he didn't bother to tell Brian). The Prime Wraith wanted the hero to be part of six living batteries for a monotrace core, opening a portal to Hell for Mephisto's armies (led by the brainwashed hero Killpower) to ravage the Earth. Captain Britain was freed and fought to hold back the demons, and tried to find a solution other than killing Killpower. "We're heroes, we don't [kill]--" was all he could say before Killpower was gunned down by the anti-heroes Major Hauer, Death's Head, and Colonel Liger. Afterwards, on a whim Captain Britain placed a union flag on top of a damaged Big Ben, deciding that surviving the battle gave them "the right to celebrate a little"

Eight months later, during the "Time Runs Out" storyline, it is revealed that the Multiverse is suffering from violent incursions between parallel Earths. Captain Britain is seen as a new member of the Illuminati. He is shown to be missing one of his eyes and states that he is the last surviving member of the Captain Britain Corps with the other members having all perished due to the collapse of the Multiverse.

=== Dawn of X and Captain Avalon ===
Following the events of Dawn of X, Brian was corrupted by Morgan le Fay and turned into her champion. Betsy resumed the role of Captain Britain and the leadership of a new Excalibur team. While Brian was freed from le Fay's thrall, the torture he suffered at Morgana's hands left him so angry that when he was given the choice between the Sword and Amulet once again, he took up the blade this time. Out of fear of what could happen, since the sword is capable of great good in the right hands, but it could also prove to be a dangerous weapon if Brian improperly unleashed on the world, he briefly gave the Sword of Might over to his sister for safe-keeping.

Later when the Sword of Might was foretold to have a role in the coming battle against the swordbearers of Arakko, Brian has finally taken it back up since part of the prophecy about the ten blades needed to save Krakoa and by extension, the entire world, implied that Betsy and Brian Braddock would both be among the champions of Krakoa. While the Sword of Might is a clear choice for one of the blades, there is a question about the second, the mysterious Starlight Sword. To this end, Brian and Betsy accompany their brother Jamie to Otherworld and the Starlight Citadel, home of Saturnyne and key capital of Otherworld. But even when they are attacked by the pocket-dimension Captain Britains created by Jamie, Brian refuses to draw the Sword of Might out of anger. He does not get a choice in the matter though, as an unintended attack by the Captain Britain - Gambit destroys the scabbard containing the blade, unleashing its magics onto Brian. The former Captain Britain is transformed, but since he did not embrace his rage and hate while wielding the sword, he is given seemingly slightly more control over the blade and his actions. He also receives a new costume, with a white, gold, and black color scheme topped with a mask reminiscent of the one he wore as Captain Britain. Dubbed Captain Avalon by Jamie, Brian announces that he stands in the defense of the Braddock family and serves at the behest of his brother, Jamie. Even Saturnyne's attempts to seduce him away from this decision fail to contend with his commitment to his wife, his brother and his sister. Brian stands as a new champion for Krakoa, even if he is not a mutant, and is last seen joining the circle of champions with their blades drawn after helping Betsy make off with the newly forged Starlight Sword.

== Powers and abilities ==
Originally, Captain Britain's powers were linked to the mystical Amulet of Right, worn around his neck. When Brian Braddock rubbed the amulet he was transformed from an ordinary mortal into a superhero version of himself, complete with a more muscular physique. The amulet could also mystically replenish his superhuman energies. He possessed a telescoping staff to vault which had other functions, the most heavily relied upon being the ability to project a force field. Later, Merlyn changed the staff into the mace-like Star Sceptre, which Captain Britain could utilize like a quarterstaff and which gave him the ability of flight. Merlyn changed his costume just before he entered the alternate Earth-238, fusing the powers of the Amulet and the Scepter into the new uniform and then later put these powers within Captain Britain himself when he was forced to rebuild Captain Britain following Captain Britain's death at the hands of the Fury, making the suit a regulatory device for his powers. Eventually, Captain Britain no longer required even the battle-suit for the full use of his powers, as his heritage of being the son of a denizen of the extra-dimensional Otherworld became enough to power him.

Brian Braddock has superhuman strength, speed, stamina, durability, reflexes, senses, and the ability to fly at supersonic speeds. He possesses enhanced perceptions that allow him to be aware of things others may miss (such as objects cloaked by spells of illusion). When he and Meggan destroyed the Otherworld energy matrix at Roma's prompting, the energies that allowed him to retain his power within the UK without his costume were dissipated. Hence, to retain his powers anywhere on Earth, he must wear the costume at all times. His costume acts as an antenna and battery, allowing him to retain his powers wherever he goes.

However, the conditions of his power were once again changed during his death and resurrection in the first story arc of Captain Britain and MI: 13 as explained by writer Paul Cornell,

As we reveal in issue five, the limits of Captain Britain's powers are now tied into his emotions. So if he's feeling very determined and confident, then he's very powerful, but if he's losing it then he'll really be losing it. He's as strong as he used to be, and he can fly, and that's all due to his magical nature, not to his costume. I've always seen him as something like the Shazam Captain Marvel, a hero formed through magic. Which means the subjective nature of what he can now do feels apt to me. As he himself says about great feats depending on whether or not he can gather all his courage together, he says: "well, I am Captain Britain."

Captain Britain is the fraternal twin of Betsy Braddock, a telepath and his ultimate successor, resulting in a strong psychic bond between the two. As described by writer Chris Claremont in the Uncanny X-Men House of M storyline, the two are in fact immune to each other's powers because of their genetic connection.

Beyond his superhuman abilities, Braddock is a trained physicist holding a doctorate in physics from the fictional Thames University.

== Reception ==
=== Critical reception ===
IGN wrote, "America has Captain America, so it's only fair that England has Captain Britain. But Brian Braddock is no mere super-soldier. He's empowered by the magic of Merlin and his daughter Roma to defend England from threats both mystical and mundane. These days, Braddock leads the members of MI:13. And as the only Marvel hero to receive the benefit of Alan Moore's pen, Captain Britain enjoys very rarefied status in the Marvel universe." Max Nason of CBR.com stated, "Plenty of people assume that Brian Braddock, otherwise known as Captain Britain, is just a British knockoff of Captain Steve Rogers. Well, that couldn't be further from the truth. Captain Britain has a wholly unique and fascinating origin story, much different than that of Captain America. To go along with his incredible backstory, Braddock's powers also help set him apart from not just Rogers, but most Marvel heroes. The evolution of Captain Britain's abilities is just as, if not more, interesting than the powers themselves." Jack Malvern of The Times stated, "Captain Britain's nemesis turned out to be lack of popularity [...] and his adventures ended after a year."

=== Accolades ===
- In 2011, IGN ranked Brian Braddock 79th in their "top 100 comic book characters" list.
- In 2012, IGN ranked Brian Braddock 34th in their "Top 50 Avengers" list.
- In 2014, Entertainment Weekly ranked Captain Britain 47th in their "Let's rank every X-Man ever" list.
- In 2015, Entertainment Weekly ranked Brian Braddock 64th in their "Let's rank every Avenger ever" list.
- In 2015, Gizmodo ranked Brian Braddock 36th in their "Every Member Of The Avengers, Ranked" list.
- In 2019, CBR.com ranked Brian Braddock 5th in their "10 Most Powerful Members Of Excalibur" list.
- In 2020, CBR.com ranked Brian Braddock 2nd in their "10 Most Powerful British Characters In Comics" list.
- In 2022, CBR.com ranked Brian Braddock 19th in their "30 Strongest Marvel Superheroes" list and 14th in their "Top 15 British Superheroes in the Marvel Universe" list.

== Literary reception ==
=== Volumes ===
==== Captain Britain and the MI: 13 - 2008 ====
According to Diamond Comic Distributors, Captain Britain and the MI: 13 #1 was the 51st best selling comic book in May 2008.

Timhyot Callahan of CBR.com called Captain Britain and the MI: 13 #1 a "very strong debut issue," saying, "Paul Cornell's "Wisdom" mini-series from 2006 to 2007 was one of my favorite Marvel comics of the past couple of years. It was full of wit, energy, and madcap ideas, mashing superheroes with faeries and Jack the Ripper duplicates. It had a vast sense of scale, and it was one of the few comics in this decompressed era that felt packed with events. So when it was announced that Cornell was going to take over as writer of "Excalibur," I was enthusiastic. This series, "Captain Britain and MI:13" is his version of "Excalibur," I guess, and I'm glad Marvel decided to launch it under this new name. It's a bit more unwieldy, but it's more appropriate. This is not "Excalibur." It's better." Bryan Joel of IGN gave Captain Britain and the MI: 13 #1 a grade of 9 out of 10, writing, "Following behind the Avengers titles, Captain Britain And MI: 13 #1 continues the string of surprisingly good Secret Invasion tie-ins. But unlike Bendis's flashback work, Captain Britainsucceeds by doing the complete opposite. It doesn't hurt that it's a fantastic book on its own terms, either. [...] What's important to note is the degree of black comedy that pervades these pages. Make no mistake: for all Captain Britain's posturing about in immorality of killing Skrulls, the characters (and, by extension, Cornell) seem to be having a grand time. It's surprisingly awesome to watch the John Lennon Skrull fly around the battlegrounds, or see Spitfire rip a Skrull's throat out with her teeth. And there's a brilliant retool of Black Knight's personality that is nothing short of perfect. Suffice it to say, there are things going on in Captain Britain And MI: 13 #1 you can't find anywhere else. I don't know if I've made this clear enough: this book is crazy. But it's crazy in all the right ways. Captain Britain And MI: 13 #1 is as good a debut to a superhero story as I can remember, and if the quality continues, this is going to be a stellar series long after the Skrulls have been beaten back."

== Other versions ==
=== Albion ===
Bran Bardic is from a world ravaged by war for almost a century. This version of Braddock chose the Sword of Might over the Amulet of Right and would later travel to Earth-616 and ally himself with Black Air and Shadow-X before creating an army of Shadow Captains in an attempt to take over England and overthrow the Captain Britain Corps.

=== Age of Apocalypse ===
In the Age of Apocalypse, Brian Braddock is a member of the Human High Council and an ally of Bolivar Trask who helps him produce Sentinels. and is also the most vocal advocate for the extermination of mutants, much to the weariness of Council members Yashida and Frost, who seem much less fanatical in their beliefs. It is later revealed that Braddock had become a victim of a mind control device that forced him to act as a mole for Donald Pierce and his Reavers. He is killed by Pierce after overcoming the device's influence and refusing to kill Emma Frost.

In an alternate AoA timeline, from What If?: Age of Apocalypse, Captain Britain is a member of the Defenders (their version of the Avengers), and uses Iron Man's armor. During the final offensive against Apocalypse, Captain Britain is killed by the Hulk (one of Apocalypse's Horsemen).

=== Marvel Zombies ===
A zombie version of Captain Britain makes minor appearances in Marvel Zombies.

=== Ultimate Marvel ===
In the Ultimate Marvel universe, Captain Britain is a member of the European Defense Initiative (the EU equivalent of the Ultimates). The group's members derive their powers from exo-suits developed by James Braddock, who oversees the EDI super soldier program.

During the Ultimatum storyline, Captain Britain (along with the other Captains) is discussing how to take action against Magneto in the Houses of Parliament. However, Multiple Man bursts in and sets off a bomb, destroying the Houses of Parliament and everyone inside. Captain Britain survives, but later dies from cancer caused by his suit.

=== Age of Ultron ===
During the Age of Ultron storyline, Captain Britain and MI-13 join Captain Marvel in fighting the Ultron Sentinels that invade London. Captain Marvel and Brian sacrifice their lives to destroy the invading Ultron Sentinels, with Faiza Hussain tasked to become the next Captain Britain.

== In other media ==
=== Television ===
- Brian Braddock as Captain Britain makes a non-speaking cameo appearance in the X-Men: The Animated Series episode "The Starjammers".
- Brian Braddock as Captain Britain appears in The Super Hero Squad Show episode "O Captain, My Captain!", voiced by Charlie Adler. This version is a member of the All-Captains Squad.
- Brian Braddock as Captain Britain makes a non-speaking cameo appearance in the Marvel Anime: X-Men episode "Destiny - Bond" as an associate of the titular X-Men.
- In March 2016, it was reported in British media that Marvel had plans to start a new series starring Brian Braddock as Captain Britain.

=== Video games ===
- Brian Braddock as Captain Britain makes a non-speaking cameo appearance in Marvel: Ultimate Alliance.
- Brian Braddock as Captain Britain appears as a playable character in Marvel Avengers Alliance.
- Brian Braddock as Captain Britain appears in Lego Marvel Super Heroes, voiced by JB Blanc.
- Brian Braddock as Captain Britain appears in Lego Marvel's Avengers, voiced by Travis Willingham.

=== Miscellaneous ===
Brian Braddock as Captain Britain was included in the Royal Mail Marvel stamp collection, illustrated by Alan Davis (penciller) and Mark Farmer (inker).

== Collected editions ==
A number of trade paperbacks have been released collecting both the early run and Alan Moore's updated version (his run being reprinted after Jamie Delano's which followed it. However, the 2005 Panini reprint renumbers it as volume 1).

Title	Format	Authors	Contents	Page Count	Publisher	ISBN	Date
Captain Britain Annual 1978	Hardcover	by Chris Claremont, with pencils by Herb Trimpe and inks by Fred Kida	reprints Captain Britain Weekly #1-7		World Distributors	ISBN 0-7235-0456-3	1977
Captain Britain Volume 1: The Birth of a Legend	Paperback	by Chris Claremont	collects Captain Britain Weekly #1-23	196 pages	Panini	ISBN 1-905239-30-0	February 2007
Captain Britain Volume 2: Hero Reborn	Paperback	by Gary Friedrich	collects Captain Britain Weekly #24-39 and Super Spider-Man and Captain Britain #231-238	204 pages	Panini	ISBN 1-905239-72-6	November 2007
Captain Britain Volume 3: The Lion and the Spider	Paperback		collects Super Spider-Man and Captain Britain #239-247, Marvel Team-Up #65-66, and Hulk Comic Weekly #1, 3-30	204 pages	Panini	ISBN 1-84653-401-1	November 2008
Captain Britain Volume 4: The Siege of Camelot	Paperback	by Alan Moore, Alan Davis and Steve Parkhouse	collects Hulk Comic Weekly #42-55, 57–63, Marvel Superheroes #377-388 and The Daredevils #1-11	258 pages	Panini	ISBN 1-84653-433-X	November 2009
Captain Britain Volume 5: End Game	Paperback	by Alan Moore, Jamie Delano and Alan Davis	collects The Mighty World of Marvel (vol. 2) #7-16 and Captain Britain Monthly #1-14	292 pages	Panini	ISBN 1-84653-459-3	December 2010
Captain Britain: Legacy of a Legend	Paperback	by Chris Claremont, Steve Parkhouse, Alan Moore and Jamie Delano	collects Captain Britain Weekly #1-2, Marvel Team-Up #65-66, material from Hulk Comic Weekly #1, 3–5, 57–59, Marvel Superheroes #377-384, 386, The Daredevils #3-4, The Mighty World of Marvel (vol. 2) #8-12 and Captain Britain Monthly #14	208 pages	Marvel US	978-1-302-90668-9	December 2016
Captain Britain Volume 1: Before Excalibur...	Paperback	by Jamie Delano and Alan Davis	collects The Mighty World of Marvel (vol. 2) #14-16 and Captain Britain Monthly #1-14	196 pages	Marvel UK	ISBN 1-85400-020-9	1988
Captain Britain Volume 2	Paperback	by Alan Moore and Alan Davis	collects Marvel Superheroes #387-388, The Daredevils #1-11 and The Mighty World of Marvel (vol. 2), #7-13	204 pages	Marvel US Panini	ISBN 0-7851-0855-6 ISBN 1-905239-10-6	2002 2005
Captain Britain Volume 1: Birth Of A Legend	Oversized Hardcover	by Chris Claremont, Gary Friedrich, Herb Trimpe and Fred Kida	collects Captain Britain Weekly #1-39 and Super Spider-Man and Captain Britain #231-232	376 pages	Marvel US	978-0-7851-5728-1	2011
Captain Britain Volume 2: Siege Of Camelot	Oversized Hardcover		collects Super Spider-Man and Captain Britain #233-247, Marvel Team-Up #65-66, and material from Hulk Comic Weekly #1, 3-55, 57-63	376 pages	Marvel US	978-0-7851-5753-3	2011
Captain Britain By Alan Moore & Alan Davis Omnibus	Oversized Hardcover	by Alan Moore, Jamie Delano, Alan Davis and Steve Parkhouse	collects Marvel Superheroes #377-388, The Daredevils #1-11, Captain America #305-306, The Mighty World of Marvel (vol. 2) #7-16, Captain Britain Monthly #1-14, New Mutants Annual #2, and Uncanny X-Men Annual #11	672 pages	Marvel US	ISBN 0-7851-3760-2	April 2009
Captain Britain Omnibus	Hardcover	by Alan Moore, Jamie Delano, Alan Davis and Steve Parkhouse	collects Marvel Superheroes #377-388, The Daredevils #1-11, Captain America #305-306, The Mighty World of Marvel (vol. 2) #7-16, Captain Britain Monthly #1-14, New Mutants Annual #2, and Uncanny X-Men Annual #11	686 pages	Panini	978-1-8465-3314-3	October 1, 2021
Captain Britain Omnibus	Oversized Hardcover	by Chris Claremont, Gary Friedrich, Alan Moore, Jamie Delano, Herb Trimpe, Fred Kida, Alan Davis and Steve Parkhouse	collects Material from Captain Britain Weekly #1-39, Super Spider-Man and Captain Britain #231-247, Hulk Comic Weekly #1, 3-55, 57–63, Marvel Superheroes #377-388, The Daredevils #1-11, The Mighty World of Marvel (vol. 2) #7-16, Captain Britain Monthly #1-14, Marvel Tales #131-133, Marvel Team-Up #65-66, New Mutants Annual #2, and Uncanny X-Men Annual #11	1368 pages	Marvel US	978-1-302-93226-8	November 9, 2021
House of M: Uncanny X-Men	Paperback	by Chris Claremont, Alan Davis and Mark Farmer	collects Uncanny X-Men #462-465	128 pages	Marvel US	ISBN 0-7851-1663-X	February 2006
X-Men: Die by the Sword'	Paperback	by Chris Claremont	collects 6-issue miniseries	128 pages	Marvel US	ISBN 0-7851-2791-7	March 2008

== See also ==
- Marvel Comics Multiverse
