= Valentina Allegra de Fontaine =

Fictional Marvel Comics character

- Valentina Allegra de Fontaine taken from the cover of Secret Warriors #3 (April 2009); Art by Jim Cheung

Publication information
- Publisher: Marvel Comics
- First appearance: Strange Tales #159 (August 1967)
- Created by: Jim Steranko

In-story information
- Alter ego: Valentina Allegra de la Fontaine
- Species: Human
- Team affiliations: Leviathan; Hydra; S.H.I.E.L.D. J.A.N.U.S. Thunderbolts
- Notable aliases: Madame Hydra; Citizen V
- Abilities: Skilled markswoman; Skilled martial artist

La Contessa Valentina Allegra de la Fontaine is a fictional character appearing in American comic books published by Marvel Comics. Created by writer-artist Jim Steranko, she first appeared in the "Nick Fury, Agent of S.H.I.E.L.D." feature in Strange Tales #159 (August 1967).

Lisa Rinna portrayed the character in the 1998 film Nick Fury: Agent of S.H.I.E.L.D., and Julia Louis-Dreyfus portrays Fontaine in the Marvel Cinematic Universe.

== Publication history ==
Valentina Allegra de la Fontaine appeared prominently throughout creator Jim Steranko's run of the Nick Fury, Agent of S.H.I.E.L.D. feature that ran through Strange Tales #168 (May 1968) and in the same-name comic-book series that began the following month.

An agent who threw S.H.I.E.L.D. chief Nick Fury for a loop upon their initial meeting, de Fontaine quickly became his love interest, and was featured in a silent, one-page seduction sequence in Nick Fury, Agent of S.H.I.E.L.D. #2 that had two panels changed, at the behest of the Comics Code Authority. In the third-to-last panel, Marvel Comics art director John Romita Sr. redrew a telephone that had been taken off the hook for privacy, placing the receiver back in the cradle; in the last panel, an image was removed and replaced with a closeup of an item from earlier in the page — a phallic long-barreled gun in a holster:

So one panel had the stereo in Fury's apartment to show there was music playing, cigarettes in the ash tray in one, there was a sequence of intercut shots where she moved closer to him, much more intimately, there was a kiss, there was a rose, and then there was one panel with the telephone off the hook, which the comic book code [sic; "Comics Code"] made him put back on ... [T]he last panel on that page had Nick and his old lady kneeling, with their arms around each other, and that was entirely too much for the Code, so the panel was replaced with a picture of a gun in its holster.

The story was reprinted as published in Nick Fury, Agent of SHIELD Vol. 2, #1 (Dec. 1983). When reprinted again, in Nick Fury, Agent of S.H.I.E.L.D.: Who Is Scorpio? (Marvel Enterprises, 2001; ISBN 978-0-7851-0766-8), however, Steranko's original final panel was reinserted. In a black-and-white long shot with screentone shading, the couple is beginning to embrace, with Fury standing and de Fontaine on one knee, getting up.

== Fictional character biography ==
Page from Strange Tales #168 (May 1968). Art by Jim Steranko and Joe Sinnott.

Contessa Valentina Allegra de la Fontaine was a member of the European jet set and a citizen of Italy. After both her parents were killed for aiding an unspecified resistance movement, de Fontaine found her life meaningless. Desiring to carry on in their places so their deaths would not be in vain, she eventually was contacted by the international espionage agency S.H.I.E.L.D. and entered a training program to be an agent.

De Fontaine first encounters S.H.I.E.L.D. director Nick Fury aboard the Helicarrier toward the end of her training, impressing Fury by tossing him head-over-heels with a judo throw after an uttering of an untoward remark about female agents. The two eventually become lovers, and their relationship continues for many years.

Thanks to her remarkable talents and skills in many areas, de Fontaine becomes a leading member of S.H.I.E.L.D. alongside others, such as Dum Dum Dugan and Clay Quartermain. She is later appointed as the leader of S.H.I.E.L.D.'s Femme Force.

De Fontaine is eventually reassigned to the position of S.H.I.E.L.D. Liaison to the United Kingdom. In that capacity, she is tasked with providing support to Union Jack, Sabra, and Arabian Knight in thwarting a Radically Advanced Ideas in Destruction (RAID) terrorist attack on London.

Shortly thereafter, she works with Lance Hunter and Alistaire Stuart to create the British version of the Superhuman Registration Act. She then met with Joseph Hauer, Pete Wisdom, Captain Britain, and Union Jack to brief the three on the ramifications on the British superhuman population.

Shortly after "Secret War", it is revealed that a Skrull posed as de Fontaine. Fury grew suspicious and killed the Skrull who reverted to her true shape, thus revealing the Skrulls' conspiracy to Fury. Additionally, another Skrull occasionally posed with her likeness. De Fontaine is freed by Iron Man along with the other humans who were kidnapped and replaced by Skrulls.

In Secret Warriors, it is revealed that Hydra has been controlling S.H.I.E.L.D. De Fontaine uses the Madame Hydra identity, and is revealed to have been a Russian mole working for Leviathan.

In the "Ravencroft" miniseries, de Fontaine appears as a member of J.A.N.U.S., a group seeking to utilize the super-human potential inside the Ravencroft medical facility for their own ends.

In Thunderbolts (vol. 5), de Fontaine is presumed dead after being imprisoned in a Russian gulag, with a Life Model Decoy subsequently impersonating her.

During the "One World Under Doom" event, de Fontaine is revealed to have survived, assumed the Citizen V identity, and joined the Fulgur Victoris, an anti-terrorism force formed by Doctor Doom from the original members of the Thunderbolts.

== Powers and abilities ==
Valentina Allegra de Fontaine is a skilled markswoman. She is also an expert at hand-to-hand combat.

== Other versions ==
=== Earth X ===
An alternate universe version of Valentina Allegra de Fontaine from Earth-9997 appears in Earth X. This version became a host for Norman Osborn's Hydra parasite, which controlled her body and removed her soul. De Fontaine's spirit later assists Mar-Vell in battling Death, Thanos, and Mephisto.

=== MC2 ===
An alternate universe version of Valentina Allegra de Fontaine from Earth-982 appears in The Amazing Spider-Girl: Comes the Carnage!.

=== Mutant X ===
An alternate universe version of Valentina Allegra de Fontaine from Earth-1298 appears in Mutant X #1.

=== Ultimate Marvel ===
An alternate universe version of Valentina Allegra de Fontaine from Earth-1610 appears in the Ultimate Marvel imprint. This version is the chairman of the OXE Group holding company as well as a member of the Kratos Club, a secret group of multimillionaires.

== In other media ==
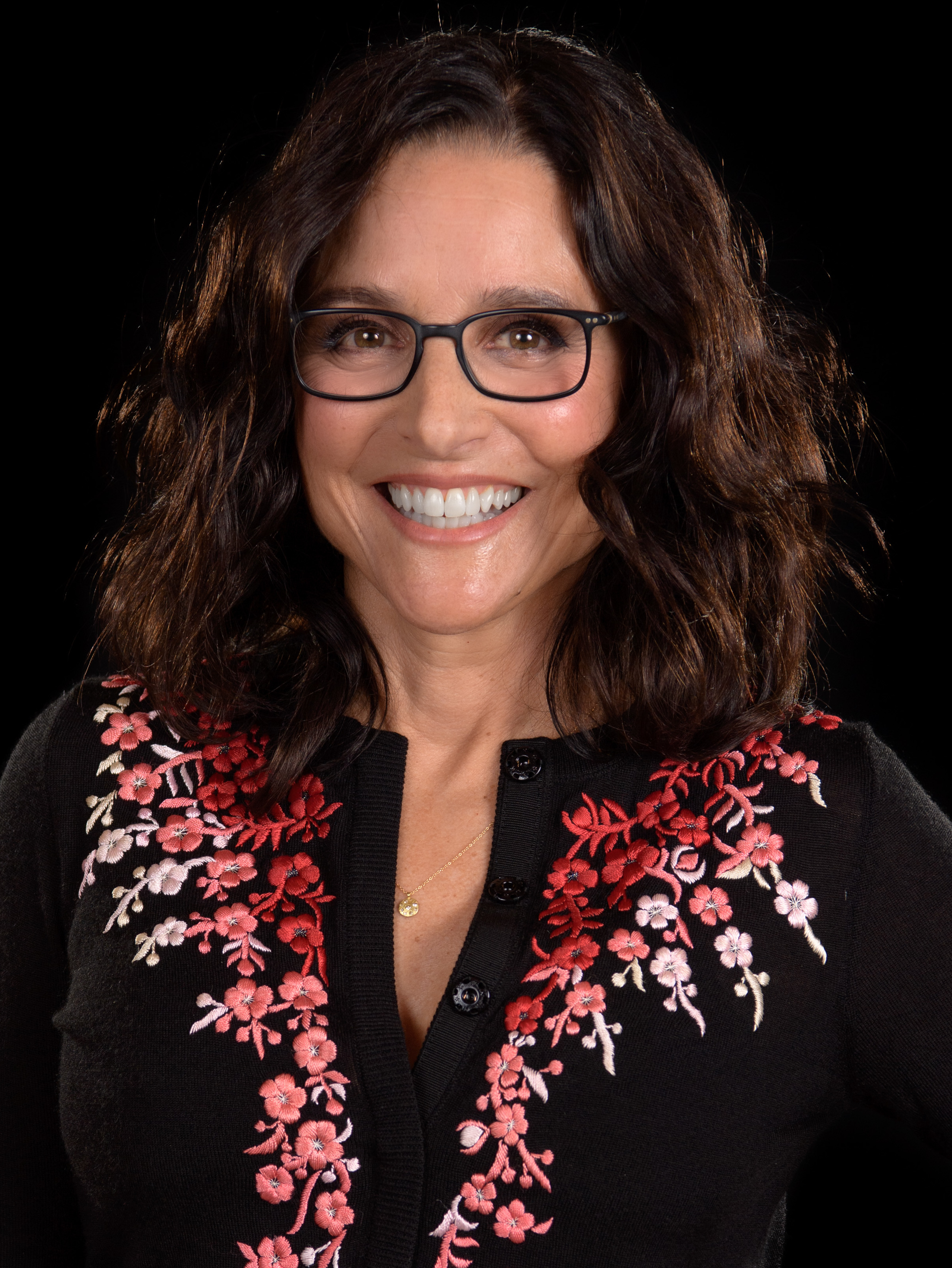
Valentina Allegra de Fontaine is portrayed by Julia Louis-Dreyfus in the Marvel Cinematic Universe.

- Valentina Allegra de Fontaine appears in Nick Fury: Agent of S.H.I.E.L.D., portrayed by Lisa Rinna.
- Valentina Allegra de Fontaine appears in media set in the Marvel Cinematic Universe, portrayed by Julia Louis-Dreyfus. In an article published in Vanity Fair, it was revealed that de Fontaine was supposed to make her first appearance in Black Widow (2021) before it was delayed due to the COVID-19 pandemic.
  - First appearing in the miniseries The Falcon and the Winter Soldier (2021), de Fontaine approaches John Walker and convinces him to become U.S. Agent.
  - De Fontaine appears in the post-credits scene of Black Widow. She approaches Yelena Belova and contracts her to target Hawkeye, claiming that he was responsible for Natasha Romanoff's death.
  - De Fontaine appears in Black Panther: Wakanda Forever (2022). She is the new director of the CIA and ex-wife of Everett K. Ross.
  - De Fontaine appears in Thunderbolts* (2025). While facing impeachment due to her work with the O.X.E. Group's "Sentry" superhuman project, she has Belova, U.S. Agent, and Ghost form the Thunderbolts, which she later rebrands as the New Avengers.

== See also ==
- List of S.H.I.E.L.D. members
