= Captain Britain and MI13 =

American comic book series

- Cover art for Captain Britain & The MI: 13 #1. Art by Bryan Hitch.

Publication information
- Publisher: Marvel Comics
- Schedule: Monthly
- Genre: Superhero
- Publication date: May 2008 – July 2009
- Main character(s): Captain Britain; Pete Wisdom; Black Knight; Blade; Spitfire; Faiza Hussain

Creative team
- Created by: Paul Cornell; Leonard Kirk
- Written by: Paul Cornell
- Penciller: Leonard Kirk
- Inker(s): Jesse Delperdang; Paul Neary; Michael Bair; Jay Leisten
- Colorist: Brian Reber

Collected editions
- Secret Invasion: ISBN 0-7851-3344-5
- Hell Comes To Birmingham: ISBN 0-7851-3345-3
- Vampire State: ISBN 0-7851-3952-4

Captain Britain and MI13 is an American comic book series published by Marvel Comics and written by Paul Cornell, with art by Leonard Kirk. The series centers on the fictional British government agency MI: 13, which is dedicated to protecting the United Kingdom from supernatural threats. The main strikeforce is led by the superhero Captain Britain (Brian Braddock), and consists of various Marvel Comics characters that are of British descent or have a connection to the country. The series launched as a tie-in to the Secret Invasion event in May 2008 and ceased publication with issue #15.

== Publication history ==
The idea for the series grew out of Cornell's first Marvel MAX limited series Wisdom, which is centered around Pete Wisdom and MI: 13. Editor Nick Lowe said, "I loved working with Paul on Wisdom and wanted to expose more readers to his writing."

In August 2007 it was announced that Cornell was going to take over writing New Excalibur, another series with close links to MI: 13, but, over time, the project morphed into a new series. Cornell explained, "I think there have been so many Excaliburs lately that Nick [Lowe] just wanted to underline that this is a fresh start. And it shows that we have a purpose firmly in mind. And it spotlights Cap, which is fine by me."

The New Excalibur team was wound up in the 2007 crossover mini-series X-Men: Die by the Sword and the major Marvel summer event of 2008, Secret Invasion, was used as a launchpad for the new Captain Britain and MI: 13 series, much like how the fallout of the 2005 summer event, House of M, was used to launch New Excalibur which after issue #4, separated from the event to become an ongoing series.

To help keep the series on schedule after the completion of the first story arc, Pat Olliffe and Paul Neary took over the art duties for issue #5 (the prologue to second storyline Hell Comes to Birmingham) from Leonard Kirk and inker Jesse Delperdang. Paul Cornell has stated that Kirk is with the series "for the duration". Michael Bair, with Jay Leisten and Craig Yeung, took over from Delperdang in issues 7 and 8 before Jay Leisten, at first with Cam Smith, took on the inking duties.

Rumors that the title might have been cancelled, when sales dropped after the Secret Invasion tie-in ended, dropping from estimates of 36,805 to 22,185 by issue #7, were denied by a Marvel spokesman who revealed plans for numerous upcoming storylines, including appearances by Doctor Doom, Dracula and the return of Meggan.

Doom and Dracula feature in the third storyarc "Vampire State" which runs for six issues and an annual.

Outside of the comic series, several members of the team make cameo appearances in Mighty Avengers #22-23, and Paul Cornell wrote an in canon Twitter micro-blog page as Captain Britain for a while, where Captain Britain describes character interactions and missions that take place off-panel between storyarcs.

The series also had additional artistic contributions by Mike Collins, Adrian Alphona and Ardian Syaf. Also received a nod in the Best Graphic Story category for Hugo Award for Best Graphic Story in 2010.

On May 19, 2009 Paul Cornell announced that issue #15 would be the last one saying:

while we didn’t know this would be the last arc until comparatively recently, I had it in mind that it was possible it would be from the time I started plotting it. Indeed, the end of this arc marks the end of what I had planned for the book when I started. One of the images right at the finish is what I always felt I was heading towards, and I’m very pleased I got there.

After the end of the series, the final battle from The Guns of Avalon story makes an appearance during a scene from Cornell and Kirk's following series Dark X-Men. Marvel announced that Cornell and Kirk would reunite to write an MI:13 story in the first issue of the Age of Heroes anthology limited series which would be followed by a Spitfire one-shot written by Cornell.

== Characters ==
The initial main cast of characters included superheroes with British backgrounds like Captain Britain, The Black Knight, and Spitfire working for MI: 13 alongside its field agents Pete Wisdom and John the Skrull. Dr. Faiza Hussain, a character first seen in this series, was introduced as a new agent of MI: 13. Former head of MI: 13, Alistaire Stuart, returns as the scientific adviser, while Tink, a MI: 13 field agent from Wisdom, returns in issue #2, although not in an official agent role.

Other British superheroes made appearances in the title, including Captain Midlands and Union Jack, Cornell has intentions to further explore a variety of other British superheroes:

One of the great things about this title is that, because all British superheroes are de facto part of MI-13, we can visit disparate parts of the Marvel UK scene without it being a big deal

When quizzed about if other British characters like some of the Knights of Pendragon, Elsa Bloodstone, Motormouth, and Killpower, Cornell stated an interest of looking at other British heroes as the series progresses. Cornell had also stated a character would be appearing who was British, even if they were not commonly thought to be, and this was revealed to be Blade, who would join the cast in issue #5. He later confirmed that the series will be featuring Motormouth and Killpower.

In issue #3, readers saw the return of Merlin, a version of the Merlyn usually seen in stories with Captain Britain (who is the physical amalgamations of all his interdimensional counterparts), specifically an 'aspect' that appeared in Marvel UK's Doctor Who comics. This fits with the mention of "Higher Evolutionaries" having imprisoned him, a group who appeared in Alan Moore's "Time War" storyline and who have Rassilon as a member. Cornell has a strong Dr Who connection and explained his choice of this 'aspect' of Merlyn:

I think we just all liked the look of Merlin with a metal skullcap, as seen in the film Excalibur. The coolest thing about Merlin being that every version of him is him. Apart from those ones in the 1950s that weren't.

== Plot ==
=== The Guns Of Avalon ===
During the Skrull Invasion, Britain comes under heavy attack by Super Skrulls, which forces a loose coalition of British superheroes to come together to fight them off under the aegis of MI: 13. The Skrulls launch an assault on the Siege Perilous, preventing access into the Otherworld (Avalon) through its portal while breaking through into Otherworld via another portal located in one their ships. While in Avalon, the Skrulls gather together mystical items and convert them for their own use to make a magically empowered Super Skrull to face the remaining British resistance in London. With all the magic gone from Avalon, Wisdom, in a last-ditch effort, releases the dark and evil magics along with Merlin who resurrects Captain Britain to aid the resistance.

Captain Britain uses Excalibur to defeat the magic empowered Super-Skrull while the dark magic beings lay claim to Great Britain and at the request of Wisdom exterminate the rest of the Skrull invaders. Standing in the devastation, Captain Britain and Wisdom announce that a team of superheroes should be brought together to face any new threat to the country including the dark magic beings while Faiza Hussain became the new wielder of Excalibur.

=== Hell Comes to Birmingham ===
The evil released by Wisdom in "Guns of Avalon" starts to cause trouble, chiefly thanks to Plokta, a new character:

He's a lovely new Leonard design, in a rather Steve Ditko vein. He's a Lord of Hell. He's not exactly humanoid," Cornell said. "He's got an important and so far unseen function in the mystical side of the Marvel Universe. And he's decided to conquer the world exponentially from a tower block in Birmingham. He's also so got our team's number, only they go in without knowing that."

Using the tower block in Birmingham, Plokta captures many people within its rooms by giving them an illusion of their hearts desire. Using the collected magical energy of these people, Plokta creates an army of Mindless Ones. When challenged by Captain Britain, Plokta reveals he has something Brian may want; Meggan. Captain Midlands betrayed his remaining comrades, allowing them to be captured by Plokta briefly. When the team eventually defeated Plokta, Midlands was taken into custody.

=== Vampire State ===
Dracula, "the greatest general of his generation", and his vampire minions leave their Moon sanctuary for a planned assault on the United Kingdom; with help from Doctor Doom. Cornell has said that it would be "a spy game, a clash of intellects, as Dracula tries to strategize and trick his way into a full on takeover of the British Isles". Black Knight and Faiza Hussain head to the African nation of Wakanda to retrieve the true Ebony Blade from Wakanda's queen, Ororo T'Challa. The team members are each intercepted by enhanced vampires, while Dracula heads directly to Faiza Hussain's family home. Kidnapping and converting Faiza's father and others while seemingly using his powers over Spitfire to bring her into his inner circle, that includes Lilith and Captain Fate where Dracula uses magic to prepare for an invasion. Britain's intelligence services begin purging themselves of vampire infiltrators, one of which manipulates MI:13 into trying to take the enchanted skull of Quincy Harker - which ensures all vampires need to be invited into the United Kingdom - into custody; this enables Dracula to learn where it is and have it destroyed, leaving the way open for a mass invasion in Fate's warships.

Using Plokta, MI:13 allow Dracula to experience his invasion plan with everything going his way; with magical barriers blocking off Britain from the rest of the world, Dracula's armies begin their invasion; disposing of most of the heroes of MI:13 and anyone else in their path. Dracula and his armies sweeps across the UK leaving only a pocket of resistance to fend off the invaders. (Cornell has stated that he checked with Marvel which characters they would allow to be killed and which they would not so that he could give the impression that Britain was genuinely falling) Dracula soon realizes this to be too easy and breaks free of the dream, but this has prevented him from sending in scouts every hour like he planned. Leading up to the invasion, Spitfire, along with Julius Mullarkey and Faiza's father, reveal that they were not, in fact, under control by Dracula and have been working under cover, and instigate an attack on board Dracula's ship. Bringing other members of MI:13 on board they help dispose of Captain Fate and free some of the converted hostages. Unable to stop Dracula fully and with Brian being harmed by Lilith, the team escapes but without Faiza's father, and, thanks to Doom, Dracula now has Captain Britain's wife Meggan.

However, this is then revealed to be an attack by Doom, as Meggan uses her powers to cause rebellion among Dracula's less loyal conscripts. Brian launches a second attack to assist her, this time showing his full power against Lilith, just in time for Dracula to learn that Wisdom had not led him to the skull of Quincy Harker but had instead led him to a fake; every action by MI:13 was to ensure Dracula wouldn't know the protection spell around the country was still active, leading to the vampire army being mostly wiped out as they remain uninvited. Dracula and his remaining loyal soldiers retreat to their fortress, trying to protect Lilith, but are pursued by MI:13, MI:13's reserves, and a Special Air Service team. Union Jack and Blade take out Dracula's coffin, Faiza destroys the Count with Excalibur, and Brian is able to destroy Lilith.

In the aftermath, Faiza has achieved knight status, Dane Whitman's stone heart curse has worn off, and the two of them (along with Brian & Meggan and Spitfire & Blade) have officially paired up. Faiza's father is returned to Earth, with Brian encouraging him to not give up but to keep on living in "a very British compromise - living with something terrible, dealing with it in domestic terms. Tragedy right up against sitcom, in a way other cultures don't really get."

=== Diplomatic Incident ===
Members of MI-13 attend an official reception in America, presided over by Steve Rogers, given in their honor for being the first country in the world to get rid of the Skrulls. Rogers offers Brian membership in the Avengers. Reactions from the MI-13 team are mixed, but Wisdom eventually, reluctantly declares that Brian will accept, and they can work out some sort of time-share.

=== Spitfire ===
While the other core members of MI-13 attend an official reception in America, Spitfire and Blade (on MI-13 orders) hunt for someone in New York

== Collected editions ==
Title	Material collected	Published date	ISBN
Captain Britain and MI:13 Vol. 1: Secret Invasion	Captain Britain and MI:13 #1-4	February 2009	978-0785133995
Captain Britain and MI: 13 Vol. 2: Hell Comes To Birmingham	Captain Britain and MI:13 #5-9	July 2009	0785133453
Captain Britain and MI: 13 Vol. 3: Vampire State	Captain Britain and MI:13 #10-15 and Annual #1	October 2009	0785139524

== Reception ==
Reviews of the first issue were largely positive, noting Cornell's solid characterization and tight plotting as well as the vein of black comedy that runs through proceedings and the smooth transition from his Wisdom limited series, despite the differences in the scale of the action, which may make the issue "a little new reader unfriendly." Comic Book Resources called it "a splendid new series," Comics Bulletin conclude "I haven't read a stronger first issue than this in a long time" and IGN agreed, stating "Captain Britain And MI: 13 #1 is as good a debut to a superhero story as I can remember." Given the good reviews and the tie-in with Secret Invasion (the first issue of which sold an estimate quarter of a million copies) the sales were high, with the first printing selling out immediately and being followed by a second printing with a variant cover based in Kirk's interior art which, in turn, sold out requiring a third printing.

The May 2008 direct sales estimates for the first issue were 47,527 making it the 51st top-selling comic title that month, more than twice the 20,000 sales for the first issue of the Wisdom limited series. Estimates fell for the second issue to 37,968 (55th place) then stayed fairly steady through issue #3 (36,934 sales estimate, 58th) and #4 (36,805, 63rd). Following the end of the Secret Invasion tie-in the sales dipped again to 32,989 (69th place) for issue #5, to 28,030 (96th) for #6 and to 22,185 (95th) with #7. Sales stabilised somewhat with issue #8 (21,233 sales and 130th ranking) but dropped further with issue #9 (18,478 and 101st in ranking).

When talking about the close of the title, Cornell stated "Our audience really left at issue four... People protest about events, but try and write a comic now without them. The audience is actually more concerned with what’s going on, with the big news, than they are with story. I’d be part of an event every issue if I could, if it meant I could keep the title going. ... after [Hell Comes to] Birmingham I realised that the only way the book would survive would be huge event stories of our own." He also said he might've had the characters visit America early on if he'd known how long he had, or put more action into Hell Comes To Birmingham.

Following 'Hell Comes To Birmingham', issue #10 recovered sales (20,626 98th in ranking), but the issues releases after did not: 17,753 (108th) for #11, 19,989 (117th) for #12 and 17,947 (111th) for #13. In June, two issues were released, and sold about the same amount: 17,754 (124th) for #14 and 16,090 (135th) for the Annual. The last issue of the series, #15, was placed 122nd, with 16,544 sales.

Comic Book Resources placed the series at #10 in their top 100 comics of 2008, describing it as the "best thing to come out of Secret Invasion" and that it is "the best new superhero title of 2008." Newsarama named Cornell one of their "nine to watch in 2009," saying that he might be "the lead in the next British invasion of writers into American comics."

The appearance of British Prime Minister Gordon Brown got considerable attention from the press. Cornell said "I'm quite a fan of Gordon Brown. I'm pleased we've given him a PR boost on both sides of the Atlantic and around the world. I feel quite sorry for him, so I'm glad I've contributed a bit."

== Awards ==
Captain Britain and MI13, Volume 3: Vampire State was nominated for the 2010 "Best Graphic Story" Hugo Award.
