= Faiza Hussain =

- Faiza Hussain wielding Excalibur. Art by Bryan Hitch.

Publication information
- Publisher: Marvel Comics
- First appearance: Captain Britain and MI: 13 #1 (May 2008)
- Created by: Paul Cornell; Leonard Kirk

In-story information
- Alter ego: Faiza Hussain
- Species: Human mutate
- Team affiliations: MI-13; Champions of Europe; Mighty Medics
- Partnerships: Black Knight (Dane Whitman)
- Notable aliases: Excalibur
- Abilities: Psionic bio-deconstruction: Ability to manipulate, assemble, and disassemble anything on an atomic level; Ability to heal the wounds of others; Ability to paralyze others; Wielder of the Excalibur Sword; Skilled sword user; Magic detection; Trained doctor

Dr. Faiza Hussain is a superheroine appearing in American comic books published by Marvel Comics. Created by writer Paul Cornell and artist Leonard Kirk, the character first appeared in Captain Britain and MI: 13 #1 (May 2008). Faiza Hussain uses the codename Excalibur. She is used as the title's "point of view character."

== Publication history ==
Faiza Hussain was created by Paul Cornell and Leonard Kirk, with the character debuting in Captain Britain and MI: 13 #1 (May 2008).

Cornell has been aided in the development of this character by a panel of Muslim women, Mona Bayoumi, Safiya Sayed Baharun, Farida Patel, and Sohere Roked.

Faiza Hussain, originally written in early scripts as "Faisa", is named after the former England cricket Captain Nasser Hussain and although she is a British Muslim character, creator Paul Cornell has stated he does not want Faiza to be a pillar for the entire British Muslim community:

I think superheroes are too prone to being standard bearers for whole communities.

— Paul Cornell

He also did not want her to say anything religious until in a situation where an everyday religious person would and steered her away from the normal clichés associated with Muslim characters.

== Fictional character biography ==
Faiza Hussain is the only daughter of a family of Pakistani heritage who lives in Chelmsford in Essex. A London-based Muslim medical doctor, and British superhero fangirl, Faiza initially gets caught up in the Skrull invasion as she is performing battlefield triage while the Skrull attack is going on around her. While tending to the wounded alongside Black Knight, Faiza is struck by a Skrull laser weapon. This weapon seemingly gives Faiza powers which she uses to help Black Knight fend off the Skrulls.

After the defeat of the Skrulls, Faiza Hussain became the wielder of Excalibur, and joined MI:13 as Black Knight's steward. When Dracula attacked the United Kingdom he personally attacked Faiza's family, injuring her mother while kidnapping her father and sending forces to attack the members of MI:13. In the aftermath of the attack, Pete Wisdom deduced that attack's aim was to keep Faiza (and Excalibur) out of the battle. He gives Faiza the codename "Excalibur" because he wants Dracula and his forces to hear and know that the mythical blade is still an active part of MI:13.

During the Secret Empire storyline, Faiza appears as a member of the Champions of Europe alongside Ares, Captain Britain, Guillotine, Outlaw, and Peregrine. Alongside Squirrel Girl and Enigma, the Champions free Paris, France from a Hydra invasion force.

== Powers and abilities ==
Faiza Hussain has the power to manipulate, assemble, and disassemble anything on an atomic level. She can disassemble a living body into its component parts while keeping the subject alive. She stopped a horde of Skrulls by preventing their bodies from moving with her powers. She is seen to use these powers not only on living organisms, but also on other kinds of materials, like Black Knight's clothes. She can also use her powers to heal the wounds of others. The extent and classification of these powers are yet to be revealed, but Black Knight described them as purely defensive.

In an interview, Paul Cornell outlined her powers:

She can safely open up a body, see what's wrong with it, and sort it out on a subatomic level. This has the incidental effect of halting shape-changers like Skrulls in their tracks (and anyone else who knows what's good for them). She has trouble doing this to magic beings.

Additionally, Faiza Hussain wields the sword of Excalibur. The sword allows her to sense magic near herself. She is also a trained doctor.

== Reception ==
=== Critical reception ===
Kieran Shiach of ComicsAlliance asserted, "Britain needs someone who represents the very best of our nation; our multiculturalism, our stiff upper lip and affable self-deprecation, even our National Health Service. Faiza Hussain is everything I love about Great Britain, and she makes me proud to be British, and if someone is going to represent my nation in superhero comic books, there's no better candidate."

=== Accolades ===
- In 2019, CBR.com ranked Faiza Hussain 4th in their "Top 15 British Superheroes in the Marvel Universe" list.
- In 2020, Scary Mommy included Faiza Hussain in their "Looking For A Role Model? These 195+ Marvel Female Characters Are Truly Heroic" list.
- In 2021, Screen Rant included Faiza Hussain in their "10 Best British Heroes Fans Would Love To See In The MCU" list.
- In 2022, Screen Rant included Faiza Hussain in their "10 Best Doctors In Marvel Comics" list.

== Other versions ==
=== Age of Ultron ===
In the Age of Ultron crossover, Faiza Hussain briefly adopts the mantle of Captain Britain from Brian Braddock in case he dies fighting Ultron.

=== Secret Wars ===
Faiza Hussain / Captain Britain appears in the two-part Secret Wars tie-in, Captain Britain and the Mighty Defenders.

== In other media ==
Faiza Hussain appears as a playable character in Marvel: Avengers Alliance.
