= MI13 =

MI13 or variant may refer to:

- Michigan's 13th congressional district
- Michigan's 13th House of Representatives district
- M-13 (Michigan highway)
- MI-13 (comics)
- An unused or classified section of the United Kingdom Directorate of Military Intelligence
