= Super Soldiers =

Comic book series

Publication information
- Publisher: Marvel UK
- Schedule: Monthly
- Format: Ongoing series
- Publication date: April - November 1993
- No. of issues: 8
- Main character(s): Alec Dalton; Dragonfly; Gog; The Guvnor; Joseph Hauer; Sarah Wilde; Xantia

Creative team
- Written by: Michael W. Bennent; Lee Stevens
- Penciller: Andrew Currie
- Inker: Rodney Ramos
- Colorist: Steve Whitaker

Super Soldiers was a comic book published by the Marvel UK imprint of Marvel Comics in 1993. Part of the shared Marvel Universe setting, it centered on a team of superhuman British soldiers, with some plot aspects drawing on the background of Marvel's successful Captain America character.

== Publication history ==
The series was canceled after eight issues, after the first part of a new storyline, when Marvel UK abruptly ceased publishing new material.

== Fictional team history ==
The Super Soldiers consisted mostly of individuals modified using biotechnology based on the American supersoldier codenamed Nuke. These characters were part of a British supersoldier program, which had been officially disbanded due to a mission gone wrong, and years later reformed along with other characters such as the rowdy mutant Guvnor, the Savage Land warrior woman Xantia, and the revived (after hibernating since the 1970s) martial artist Dragonfly, to work alongside S.H.I.E.L.D. and the U.S. Agent. In the eighth and final issue of the series, the unit found themselves privatised and their contracts sold to the Mercy Corporation as an "autonomous superhero response unit".

Team leader Joseph Hauer, appeared during a briefing alongside Pete Wisdom, Captain Britain and Union Jack on the details of the British Superhuman Registration Act by Contessa Valentina Allegro de Fontaine, Alistaire Stuart and Commander Lance Hunter as part of the superhuman Civil War.

Years later the Super Soldiers had retired and written a book about their exploits; a (bad) movie was made of their book, with Gog, Guvnor, and Dalton playing themselves (as part of the contract and they could barely act) and Hauer as advisor. Most people considered them embarrassing relics, including Pete Wisdom who came to warn them about attacks on British superheroes but had no interest in recruiting them. When Mephisto's Psycho-Wraiths attacked the area to capture Hauer, the Super-Soldiers refused to withdraw but instead sacrificed themselves to allow civilians to escape. Hauer was freed and helped defeat Hell's invasion of Earth, gunning down a demonic Killpower. (The other three appear to be dead) S.H.I.E.L.D. recruited him as their new European Division head.
