= Slaymaster =

- Slaymaster as depicted in Uncanny X-Men #256 (October 1989). Art by Jim Lee (penciler), Scott Williams (inker), and Glynis Oliver (colorist).

Publication information
- Publisher: Marvel Comics
- First appearance: Super Spider-Man and Captain Britain #243 (October 1977)
- Created by: Jim Lawrence (writer); Larry Lieber (writer); Ron Wilson (artist)

In-story information
- Species: Human
- Abilities: Exceptional hand-to-hand combatant and tactician

Slaymaster is a fictional character appearing in American comic books published by Marvel Comics. The character has appeared in the Captain Britain series.

== Publication history ==
Slaymaster's first appearance was in Super Spider-Man and Captain Britain #243 (October 1977), a weekly Marvel UK title which featured a mix of reprint and original material. He was created by Jim Lawrence, Larry Lieber, and Ron Wilson. Slaymaster was killed off in the 1985 Captain Britain series.

== Fictional character biography ==
Slaymaster is hired by Vixen to kill all of the members of S.T.R.I.K.E.'s psi-division, including Captain Britain's sister Betsy Braddock. Slaymaster manages to kill most of the psi-division except for Alison Double, Tom Lennox and Braddock. Captain Britain's intervention on behalf of his sister results in a rematch between himself and Slaymaster, which ends in Slaymaster's defeat.

Slaymaster manages to capture Captain Britain and steals his costume, which is thought to be the source of Captain Britain's powers. However, he discovers that the costume that Captain Britain wears is a regulatory device. Captain Britain retains his powers without the suit, though in a less controlled state, and manages to kill Slaymaster.

In the series Deadpool Team-Up, mercenary Jasper Bateman becomes the second Slaymaster, having obsessed over the original Slaymaster his entire adult life. He spends years hunting down the security designer for Slaymaster's lair and acquires the necessary clearance codes to safely enter and obtain all of the equipment and weapons of his predecessor. He is eventually defeated by the combined efforts of Deadpool and Captain Britain and taken into custody.

== Powers and abilities ==
Slaymaster is a master hand-to-hand combatant and a world class assassin, on various occasions he is depicted as having more than normal balance and reflexes.

He has demonstrated unknown defenses to both telepathy and telekinesis.

His preferred weapons are specialized high tech needles with which he can shower a deadly barrage upon opponents. He has also used swords, armor, laser cannons, and an inter-dimensional teleportation device. Using a ninja technique, Slaymaster toughened the striking surfaces of his left hand to produce a tough callous and sharpened it to produce a deadly razor edge, providing him with a built-in bladed weapon.

Slaymaster has been depicted as gaining strength and speed at a superhuman level by killing his alternate-reality analogues and absorbing their essence.

== Other versions ==
An alternate version of Slaymaster appears in Exiles. This version is an ally of Hydra. He collaborates with Hydra member Madame Hydra to kill alternate universe versions of Psylocke until the main universe Psylocke tracks him down and kills him in combat.

== Awards ==
- 1986: Nominated for "Favourite Villain" Eagle Award
