= Dermot Power =

Irish artist

- Area: Artist
- Notable works: Judge Dredd; Digitek; Sláine

Dermot Power, originally from County Waterford, Ireland, is a movie concept artist who started his career as a comic book artist working for British anthology comic 2000 AD.

== Biography ==
He got his break in comic books when he was commissioned to do the cover of a Judge Dredd video game back in 1990. His painterly covers quickly established him as a major talent. He then worked for 2000 AD on flagship titles like Judge Dredd and Sláine up until 1997, when he successfully pursued a career in the film industry as a storyboard and concept artist.

He has served as a conceptual artist on movies such as Star Wars: Episode II – Attack of the Clones, Charlie and the Chocolate Factory, Batman Begins, the Harry Potter series, and Alice in Wonderland.

He has also painted the artwork for several Batman trading cards, and a number of illustrations for the Magic: The Gathering and Warcraft card games.

== Bibliography ==
- Judge Dredd:
  - "The Apartment" (with John Wagner, in 2000 AD #722, 1991)
  - "Muzak Killer" (with Garth Ennis, in 2000 AD #746–748, 1991)
  - "Teddy Choppermitz" (with Garth Ennis, in 2000 AD #760, 1991)
  - "Muzak Killer: Live!" (with Garth Ennis, in 2000 AD #837–839, 1993)
  - "Book of the Dead" (with Grant Morrison and Mark Millar, in 2000 AD #859–866, 1993, tpb, Hamlyn, 1996, ISBN 0-7493-9692-X)
  - "The Big Sleet" (with Peter Hogan, in 2000 AD #920, 1994)
- Digitek (with co-authors John Tomlinson and Andy Lanning, 4-issue mini-series, Marvel UK, 1992)
- Sláine (with Pat Mills):
  - "Demon Killer" (with Glenn Fabry, in 2000 AD #852–859, 1993)
  - "Queen of Witches" (in 2000 AD #889–896, 1994)
  - "Treasures of Britain, Part I" (in 2000 AD #1001–1010, 1996)
  - "Treasures of Britain, Part II" (in 2000 AD #1024–1031, 1997)
- Sonic the Comic:
  - Various covers
