= Digitek (character) =

Publication information
- Publisher: Marvel Comics
- First appearance: Digitek #1 (December 1992)
- Created by: John Tomlinson and Andy Lanning (writers); Dermot Power (artist)

In-story information
- Alter ego: Jonathan Bryant
- Team affiliations: Nakasoni Corporation; MI-13; Psi-Key
- Notable aliases: The Singularity
- Abilities: Energy analogue; can create armor and a vast amount of weapons, establish psi-links with others, travel through phone lines, create holograms.

Digitek (Jonathan Bryant) is a character appearing in American comic books published by Marvel Comics. He first appeared in Digitek #1 (December 1992), the first issue of a limited series published by Marvel UK. The strip was also published in Marvel UK's weekly anthology title Overkill. The character was created by writers John Tomlinson and Andy Lanning and artist Dermot Power.

== Publication history ==
Digitek was initially published in two different formats - as a four-issue limited series, using the standard Marvel Comics format, and as one of the strips in the UK anthology Overkill, published in a format similar to that of 2000 AD. The inside front covers of the limited series featured 'in-universe' text pieces (such as memos from the fictional Nakasoni Corporation) that established links between Digitek and the other Marvel UK titles (such as Warheads and Genetix). These documents were not reprinted in the Overkill anthology.

At the time, this was a standard publication method for Marvel UK, with the intention that Overkill would be better suited to the UK market, whereas the 'standard' Marvel format would be better suited to comic shops in other countries. As with most of the other Marvel UK titles, Digitek also attempted to attract existing Marvel Comics fans by including a prominent Marvel character in the initial storyline - the cyborg Deathlok.

After the initial limited series, Digitek made no further appearances in Marvel UK comics. The character made no other actual appearances until 2009. The final issue of Captain Britain and MI13 included a cameo appearance by Digitek, who is now working as a reserve agent for MI-13.

== Fictional character biography ==
Kether Troop, a team of Mys-Tech mercenaries tasked with recovering alien technology from alternate dimensions, manage to retrieve a product called Protosilicon from an unknown source and install it on an item known as Jump 61. Technological analysis of the item follows, and Jonathan Byrant is assigned as the project leader. His supervisor, Mr. Grant, sabotages the project with a computer virus, but Byrant receives a vision of these events and rushes back to the facility. He arrives just as the building explodes, and is believed to have been killed. Byrant survives and finds that the suit has bonded with him. Choosing to use his powers for good, Byrant decides to call himself after the project: Digitek.

=== Civil War and MI:13 ===
Digitek is among the heroes opposing the Superhero Registration Act during the Superhuman Civil War. After being apprehended by S.H.I.E.L.D., Digitek seemingly commits suicide by transforming his arm into a gun and shooting himself. S.H.I.E.L.D. considers Digitek's suicide to be a possible hoax to allow him to escape from Negative Zone Prison Alpha.

Digitek later appears, alive and unharmed, as a reserve agent of the intelligence agency MI-13. The caption accompanying his reintroduction stated that he is "back from intelligence gathering in the USA".
