= MI-13 (comics) =

Fictional comic book British government agency

Publication information
- Publisher: Marvel Comics
- First appearance: New Excalibur #1
- Created by: Warren Ellis; Chris Claremont; Michael Ryan

In-story information
- Base(s): MI-13 HQ, Portwell House, Whitehall
- Member(s): Black Knight; Blade; Captain Britain; Dark Angel; Death's Head (Minion); Digitek; Excalibur; Gloriana; Micromax; Motormouth; Spitfire; Alistaire Stuart; Tangerine; Union Jack; Pete Wisdom

MI-13, sometimes written MI13, is a fictional British intelligence agency appearing in American comic books published by Marvel Comics. MI-13 is depicted as operating out of Portwell House in Whitehall. It was introduced in Excalibur #101, by Warren Ellis under the call sign "The Department" for ten years until New Excalibur #1 explicitly mentioned the term "MI13"; although invariably referred to as such, the agency's official name is the Extraordinary Intelligence Service (EIS).

The department is closely associated with Marvel characters Alistaire Stuart and Pete Wisdom, and, after being named MI-13, it would subsequently appear in Wisdom, and most recently, the ongoing Captain Britain and MI13; both written by Paul Cornell.

It was originally overseen by Sir Mortimer Grimsdale, the Joint Intelligence Committee Chair in the Marvel Universe. After he was revealed to have been replaced by a Skrull, MI-13 became far more autonomous; he was replaced as JIC Chair by Lance Hunter. Other intelligence chiefs shown as Sir Clive Reston KBE, Director of MI6; and Annabel Warner, newly appointed Director of MI5.

== Fictional team history ==
MI-13 is the latest in a long line of fictional British intelligence agencies dealing with "weird happenings" within the United Kingdom. It followed the likes of Special Tactical Reserve for International Key Emergencies (S.T.R.I.K.E.), Resource Control Executive (R.C.X.), Department of Unknown and Covert Knowledge (D.U.C.K.), and the Weird Happenings Organisation (W.H.O.). It evolved from the remnants of W.H.O. when Alistaire Stuart was asked by the government in Excalibur #101 (September 1996) to take the old W.H.O., Black Air (a corrupt department that had usurped W.H.O.'s and others' mandate), and all other related paranormal organisations and rationalise them into a single department.

This department was next seen in X-Force #115 (June 2001) with Stuart standing alongside Pete Wisdom. However, it went unnamed until 2006 when Wisdom revealed himself to be an agent of MI-13 in New Excalibur #1 (January 2006). In the New Excalibur series, M-13 funded the reforming of Excalibur superhero team.

Later that year, MI-13 were later explored in Paul Cornell's Marvel MAX limited series Wisdom in which the department became involved in a military operation against Otherworld before signing a peace treaty, which includes a mutual defense pact, and facing an invasion of other dimensional Martians. The series also highlighted the clashes MI-13 have with other intelligence agencies, including MI6 who wish to have jurisdiction over "weird happenings" and believe all the specialist groups like MI-13 are doomed to fail. MI6 had convinced Stuart leave MI-13 to work for them as scientific adviser, leaving Pete Wisdom as the only senior officer reporting directly to the Chair of the Joint Intelligence Committee.

Most recently in the first story arc of Paul Cornell's Captain Britain and MI13 (July 2008) series, Britain is attacked by a Skrull armada and a wave of empowered Super Skrulls during the Secret Invasion crossover event. The JIC Chair, Sir Mortimer Grimsdale, is revealed to be a Skrull, leaving Wisdom in command of MI-13, with the Prime Minister stating the all British superheroes are now members of the agency "like it or not". While other superheroes face the Skrull onslaught on London, Spitfire and Captain Britain are dispatched, along with John the Skrull (a turncoat loyal to MI-13) and Wisdom, to link up with the forces of Avalon and protect Earth's magic from Skrull attack. In order for the mission to succeed, Pete Wisdom had to release the dark magic and demons imprisoned in Avalon; while this led to the dark forces, headed by Satannish, creating an anti-Skrull barrier around the United Kingdom, it also meant demonic forces would now be trying to conquer the nation. John does not survive the mission.

MI-13 was restructured to support a semi-autonomous and public superhero team, headed by Captain Britain, while keeping the precise nature of the supernatural threat hidden from the public. The intention is to be both effective while ensuring the superheroes feel uncompromised (a frequent problem with the American Superhero Registration Act).

When Dracula moved to conquer the United Kingdom, he opened with a pre-emptive strike on MI:13's superhero team. The agency swiftly regrouped along with MI5 and MI6, and began the elimination of all vampire agents within the British intelligence agencies. However they were (seemingly) unwittingly manipulated into leading Dracula to the location of Quincy Harker's remains, which were enchanted to ensure vampires needed to be invited (individually) into the country. Dracula was now able to lead his full army to the country and magically seal it off from the rest of the world. Unknown to Dracula, Pete Wisdom had deliberately led Dracula to fake remains and MI-13 then used the captive demon Dr. Plokta to trap the vampire in his own victorious fantasies, both to gain intelligence on him and to ensure he couldn't send in advance troops and find out the protection spell was still active. With the help of this, direct strikes, and actions by undercover agents, MI-13 ensured that Dracula was unaware until his forces entered UK airspace and were mostly wiped out. They then invaded his fortress, backed up by their reserves and the Special Air Service, and comprehensively destroyed Dracula's assets, his army, and the count himself.

Members of MI-13 later attend an official reception in America presided over by Steve Rogers, given in their honor for being the first country in the world to get rid of the Skrulls.

MI-13 would move its offices to the Shard.

When Mys-Tech tried to send Britain to Hell, MI-13 were left out of the loop and the British government had S.H.I.E.L.D. (who had greater resources) deal with the cleanup; years later, Pete Wisdom was furious to learn the incident had been completely covered up even from him and with the approval of Lance Hunter. S.H.I.E.L.D. Europe's boss (at the time possessed Msy-Tech's Psycho-Wraith Prime) would remark that S.H.I.E.L.D. simply wanted to reverse-engineer the villain's technology and didn't care about the British heroes, "forcing MI-13" to deal with them instead. Wisdom and MI-13 worked to hold off Prime's planned invasion from Hell, with Wisdom snarking "here come the Yanks, just in time to save us all" when S.H.I.E.L.D. arrived at the end of the battle.

== Members ==
All superheroes native to the British Isles are considered part of MI-13, meaning they can be called by the government at any time. Paul Cornell said, "One of the great things about [Captain Britain and MI13] is that, because all British superheroes are de facto part of MI-13, we can visit disparate parts of the Marvel UK scene without it being a big deal."

Heroes such as The Black Knight, Captain Britain, Union Jack and Spitfire have been shown/stated to work on behalf of MI-13. When the superhero team (New) Excalibur was revived, it was also funded by MI-13. its members included Captain Britain and MI-13 spy and field team leader Pete Wisdom along with Juggernaut, Sage, Dazzler and Nocturne.

Vampire hunter Blade joined MI-13 in Captain Britain and MI13 #5, while Faiza Hussain, a new character first introduced in that series, joined after the Secret Invasion tie-in issues. Motormouth and Killpower were shown to be reservist of MI-13 in Captain Britain and MI13 #11, and later so were Dark Angel, Digitek, Death's Head II, and Tangerine in #15.

Other shown members with official positions within the agency have included:

Name	Position	Status	Additional notes
Black Knight (Dane Whitman)	Field agent	Active	Returned to England wielding the Ebony Blade
Blade	Field agent	Active	
Rory Campbell	Mutant liaison and Management	Inactive	The first person Stuart recruited for the then-unnamed department, Campbell later defected when he took the role of Famine as part of Horsemen of Apocalypse.
Captain Britain	Field agent	Active	
Captain Midlands (Sid Ridley)	Field agent	Inactive	An elderly and right-wing Captain America analogue. Turned on the team and led them into a trap; later imprisoned.
Constance	Agent	Unknown	
Dark Angel	Reserve	Inactive (depowered)	
Death's Head (Minion)	Reserve	Active	
Digitek	Reserve	Active	Superhuman; spent time on an intelligence gathering mission in the US.
Excalibur	Field agent	Active	A young doctor, wielder of the legendary sword, Excalibur, and steward to the Black Knight. Progressed to knight status after slaying Dracula.
Farisa	Agent	Unknown	
John the Skrull	Field agent	Inactive (deceased)	A Skrull infiltrator in the form of John Lennon, who went native in the 1960s. Killed during the Skrull invasion of Earth.
Killpower (Julius Mullarkey)	Reserve	Inactive (deceased)	
Gloriana	Field agent	Active	
Micromax (Scott Wright)	Field agent	Active	Micromax is a mutant who has been sent to the United States to assist O*N*E
Rana Mousabi	Special agent	Inactive (deceased)	Killed by Warwolves.
Motormouth (Harley Davis)	Reserve	Inactive (retired)	
O	quartermaster and part-time occult physics researcher	Active	The character's design and name are based on Charles Hawtrey's character in Carry On Spying, while his position is an analog of James Bond's Q
Maureen Raven	Field agent	Inactive (deceased)	Mother of Jonathan Raven. Had affair with Pete Wisdom and was used by James Ransom to form a link with the Martian Masters of Earth-691 that allowed them to form a portal to Earth-616; Wisdom was forced to kill her to terminate the link. She was a clairsentient who had the power to take control of people.
Spitfire	Field agent	Active	
Alistaire Stuart	(Former) Director Scientific Adviser	Active	Left to work as Scientific Adviser for MI6 after being convinced MI-13 could not stand against an other dimensional Martian invasion. Has seemingly returned to 13 in a scientific role, with tension between him and Wisdom Left dimensionally inflexible after an unspecified encounter with Morgan le Fey.
Tangerine	Reserve	Active	
Tink (Tinkabelinos Hardleg)	Field agent	Inactive	Otherworld fairy and daughter of Oberon
Pete Wisdom	Director	Active	Mutant, formerly the field team leader; agent of several of the previous agencies.
Union Jack (Joseph Chapman)	Field agent	Active	Joined team in X-Men Legacy 13.
Unnamed teleporter	Undercover Agent	Active	

== Other versions ==
In the Age of Ultron storyline, MI-13 members Black Knight, Excalibur, and new members Computer Graham and Magic Boots Mel assist Captain Marvel and Captain Britain into fighting the Ultron Sentinels that were invading London. During the battle, Computer Graham and Magic Boots Mel were killed in the fight against the Ultron Sentinels.

== Collected editions ==
Title	Material collected	Published date	ISBN
Captain Britain and MI:13 Vol. 1: Secret Invasion	Captain Britain and MI:13 #1-4	February 2009	978-0785133995
Captain Britain and MI: 13 Vol. 2: Hell Comes To Birmingham	Captain Britain and MI:13 #5-9	July 2009	0785133453
Captain Britain and MI: 13 Vol. 3: Vampire State	Captain Britain and MI:13 #10-15 and Annual #1	October 2009	0785139524
