= Lance Hunter =

Fictional character

- Lance Hunter

Publication information
- Publisher: Marvel Comics
- First appearance: Captain Britain Weekly #19 (February 16, 1977)
- Created by: Gary Friedrich (writer); Herb Trimpe (artist)

In-story information
- Species: Human
- Team affiliations: Royal Navy; MI-13; MI6; S.T.R.I.K.E. S.H.I.E.L.D.
- Partnerships: Mockingbird
- Abilities: Trained special agent Spy and munitions expert

Lancelot "Lance" Hunter is a fictional character appearing in American comic books published by Marvel Comics. He first appeared in Captain Britain Weekly #19 (February 16, 1977) and was created by writer Gary Friedrich and artist Herb Trimpe.

Hunter is a Royal Navy Commander who became Director of S.T.R.I.K.E. before later gaining the rank of Commodore and becoming Joint Intelligence Committee Chair.

The character made his live-action debut in the Marvel Cinematic Universe television series Agents of S.H.I.E.L.D., portrayed by Nick Blood.

== Publication history ==
Created by Gary Friedrich, and first penciled by Herb Trimpe, Hunter made his debut in Captain Britain Weekly #19 on February 16, 1977. He was the UK, and S.T.R.I.K.E., counterpart to Marvel's Nick Fury, Agent of S.H.I.E.L.D. Hunter continued to appear within the pages of Captain Britain Weekly throughout the rest of 1977 but would not appear on panel again until 30 years later in the Civil War: Battle Damage Report one-shot in 2007.

== Fictional character biography ==
After Tod Radcliffe, a S.T.R.I.K.E. traitor secretly working for the Red Skull, is exposed, Commander Lance Hunter introduces himself as the director of S.T.R.I.K.E. to Nick Fury. The agents of S.T.R.I.K.E. and S.H.I.E.L.D. worked together to track down the Red Skull's Nazi activities. It was then revealed that Red Skull has kidnapped the British Prime Minister, James Callaghan, and set a germ bomb on Big Ben to be detonated at midnight. Hunter, aided by Fury, Captain Britain, and Captain America, stops the bomb.

Hunter aids Captain Britain in the capture of villain Lord Hawk, and takes him to S.T.R.I.K.E. headquarters to recover. However, Captain Britain's spirit is summoned away by Merlin to another realm, where he battles a monstrous giant. Injuries suffered in this spirit realm transfer to Captain Britain's real body. When Hunter finally admits defeat at the bed side of Captain Britain's lifeless body, the Captain returns to Earth.

Sometime after S.T.R.I.K.E. is dissolved, Hunter gained the rank of commodore and was seen alongside Contessa Valentina Allegro de Fontaine, and Alistaire Stuart briefing British superhumans on the details of the British Superhuman Registration Act. Following the Skrull invasion of Earth, and the revelation that the then-Joint Intelligence Committee chair person was a Skrull impostor, Hunter was made the new JIC Chair.

Hunter then appears as a supporting character in the 2016 Mockingbird series. He is reintroduced as a much younger man and given a romantic connection to Mockingbird, echoing the character's live-action adaptation in Agents of S.H.I.E.L.D..

== Powers and abilities ==
Lance Hunter has years of Naval training, with an expertise in munitions, as well as experience in espionage from working for British Intelligence.

== Other versions ==
In Earth-22110, Lance Hunter is Rifleman. He is a Captain Britain Corps member.

== In other media ==
Nick Blood as Lance Hunter in the television series, Agents of S.H.I.E.L.D.

- Lance Hunter appears in Agents of S.H.I.E.L.D., portrayed by Nick Blood. This version is a decorated member of the SAS, freelance mercenary, and ex-husband of Bobbi Morse who works for Phil Coulson's reconstituted S.H.I.E.L.D.
- During the airing of the second season of Agents of S.H.I.E.L.D., it was reported that Blood and Morse would appear in the spin-off series Marvel's Most Wanted. However, the series was put on hold indefinitely and eventually cancelled.
