= S.T.R.I.K.E. =

Fictional intelligence agency in the Marvel Comics Universe

Publication information
- Publisher: Marvel Comics
- First appearance: Captain Britain Weekly #17 (February 2, 1977)
- Created by: Gary Friedrich (writer); Larry Lieber (editor)

In-story information
- Type of organization: Intelligence agency

Roster

S.T.R.I.K.E., an acronym for Special Tactical Reserve for International Key Emergencies, is a fictional counter-terrorism and intelligence agency appearing in American comic books published by Marvel Comics. The organization often deals with superhuman threats, and was introduced in Captain Britain Weekly #17 as the United Kingdom's counterpart to the United States' anti-terrorism agency S.H.I.E.L.D.

This team appeared in the films Captain America: The Winter Soldier (2014) and Avengers: Endgame (2019). This version of the team were actually undercover Hydra agents. In various MCU film and television appearances, S.T.R.I.K.E. is a unit within S.H.I.E.L.D., not an independent organization.

== Publication history ==
S.T.R.I.K.E. first appeared in Captain Britain Weekly #17 and was created by Gary Friedrich and Larry Lieber.

== Bases of operation ==
S.T.R.I.K.E.'s original headquarters, as seen in the organization's first appearances, was an undersea air base which contained several of S.T.R.I.K.E.'s planes that were considered superior to their American counterparts at the time.

S.T.R.I.K.E.'s Psi division had their own headquarters.

Another headquarters was in a closed university, located in London, England; this headquarters was later used by D.U.C.K (Department of Unknown and Covert Knowledge).

== Members ==
Like S.H.I.E.L.D., S.T.R.I.K.E. had hundreds of agents throughout several divisions.

=== Executive directors and deputy directors ===
- Tod Radcliffe - Director of S.T.R.I.K.E.
- Commander Lance Hunter - Hunter is a former SAS soldier and mercenary and the second director of S.T.R.I.K.E.

=== Psi-division ===
- Elizabeth Braddock - Twin sister of Captain Britain. She later joins the X-Men as Psylocke and is a former member of the Exiles.
- Tom Lennox (Ghast) - A telepath and a telekinetic; he was Betsy Braddock's lover. During the Jasper's Warp saga, Lennox is gunned down by S.T.R.I.K.E.'s armored anti-superhuman "Beetle" squad. He was revived on Krakoa.
- Alison Double (Albedo) - An albino telepath, clairvoyant, and aura reader. She later resided in Switzerland before dying in a car crash. She was revived on Krakoa.
- Kevin Mulhearn (Xanth) - A telepath; he took an outside job as a mentalist using the name Doctor Destiny. He was performing his mind reading act at a theater in London, using his powers to tell what people had in their possession. Xanth was killed by Slaymaster, who had been charged with killing all of S.T.R.I.K.E.'s Psi-Division and infiltrated his audience as a volunteer. Xanth was revived on Krakoa.
- Vicki Reppion (Rubedo) - Killed by Slaymaster. Revived on Krakoa.
- Avril Davis - Killed by Slaymaster.
- Dennis Rush - Killed by Slaymaster.
- Andrew Hornby - Killed by Slaymaster.
- Leah Mickleson - Killed by Slaymaster.
- Stuart Hattrick - Killed by Slaymaster.

=== Sci-Tech division ===
- "Matthew" (codename) - Recruited Betsy Braddock to join S.T.R.I.K.E.'s Psi-division. He later was recruited into R.C.X. as a regulator and given the new codename of Gabriel.

== Other versions ==
An alternate universe iteration of S.T.R.I.K.E. appears in the Ultimate Marvel imprint, with Betsy Braddock and Dai Thomas as prominent members.

== In other media ==
- S.T.R.I.K.E. appears in media set in the Marvel Cinematic Universe, with Brock Rumlow and Jack Rollins as prominent members. This version of the organization is S.H.I.E.L.D.'s counter-terrorism tactical unit, with its members being secretly aligned with Hydra as sleeper agents. They first appear in the live-action film Captain America: The Winter Soldier while alternate timeline versions of S.T.R.I.K.E. appear in the live-action film Avengers: Endgame and the animated Disney+ series What If...? episode "What If... the Watcher Broke His Oath?"
- S.T.R.I.K.E. agents appear as playable characters in Marvel Strike Force. This version of the organization's acronym stands for the Special Tactical Reserve for Interdimensional Key Events.
