= Pete Wisdom =

Fictional character

- Cover art for Captain Britain & MI:13 #2. Art by Bryan Hitch.

Publication information
- Publisher: Marvel Comics
- First appearance: Excalibur vol.1 #86 (February 1995)
- Created by: Warren Ellis (writer); Ken Lashley (artist)

In-story information
- Alter ego: Peter Paul "Pete" Wisdom
- Species: Human mutant
- Team affiliations: MI-13; Black Air; MI6; X-Force; New Excalibur
- Notable aliases: Winston
- Abilities: Able to throw "hot knives" of shearing energy from his fingertips Great leaping Experienced spy

Peter "Pete" Wisdom is a fictional secret agent appearing in American comic books published by Marvel Comics. He first appeared in Excalibur #86 (February 1995), and was created by Warren Ellis and Ken Lashley. Wisdom is a British Secret Service agent with the mutant ability to throw "blades" of energy ("hot knives") from his fingertips.

== Publication history ==
Pete Wisdom was initially created by Ellis and drawn by Ben Dilworth, in a pitch for Electric Angel for publisher Trident Comics. Wisdom was an angry young Essex man, with the power to summon electricity. Ellis said at Toronto Comicon 2005 that the character is based on Jack Regan from The Sweeney. Later, at Marvel, Wisdom formally debuted, his first appearance was as an agent for the British covert organization Black Air in Excalibur #86 (February 1995).

Along with Kitty Pryde, Peter starred in the Pryde and Wisdom three-issue miniseries, which introduced Wisdom's sister Romany, as well as his father Harold, a retired Scotland Yard inspector. Soon after, Warren Ellis became the 'plotmaster' of X-Force (Ian Edginton was the actual scripter). He next appeared in New Excalibur scripted by Chris Claremont. Originally, the series' mandate was to explore the fallout from House of M in Britain.

In November 2006, Pete Wisdom also starred in a six-issue limited series titled Wisdom under the MAX comics imprint. From May 2008 to July 2009 Wisdom appeared as one of the main characters in the series Captain Britain and MI: 13.

== Fictional character biography ==
Pete Wisdom was born to Scotland Yard detective-sergeant Harold Wisdom. He has a sister, Romany, who is an occultist, a former employee of the police's Department of Unusual Deaths (Dept F.66) and ally of Union Jack. His mother was killed by mass murderer Michael Robert Ryan while waiting for Pete to visit, a visit he had blown off after an argument with her (both he and his father blame him for her death). He went on to join MI6 and later transferred to its fellow intelligence agency Black Air, where he alluded to having been in a relationship with his superior, Michelle Scicluna.

Due to being constantly sent out on wetworks (assassination assignments), he grows to hate his job and asks for a transfer. Scicluna tasks him to act as a non-combat adviser to Excalibur, who Black Air had requested to investigate in Genosha for them, and in return he will be permitted to leave Black Air. He borrows Excalibur transport to reach and help an old friend, being forced to take Kitty Pryde with him; the two of them end up investigating Black Air's "Dream Nails" facility and the horrors within, and Wisdom is almost tortured to death by one of his employer's agents. Following this he is invited to join Excalibur by Kitty and they start a relationship (leading to an ongoing feud between him and Lockheed).

Both Wisdom and Excalibur are able to expose Black Air's links to the Hellfire Club, cripple the organization, and prevent its grand scheme. With Kitty, he teams up his father, his sister, and Department F.66 to track down an occult serial killer. A remnant cell of Black Air hires a contract killer and former girlfriend of Wisdom's to assassinate him. He manages to escape, but has Nightcrawler briefly captured by the cell; the guilt causes him to become far more anti-social, driving Kitty away. Unwilling to see if the relationship can be salvaged, he leaves Excalibur.

After Excalibur, and now sporting an unnecessary eye patch to look sexy, he organizes a group of former intelligence operatives to strike out at black-ops agencies and individuals, and requests X-Force's aid in recovering a cybernetic brain from Genosha, fighting Magneto in the process. Wisdom is later seen as the new leader of the team. He acts as a mentor and shows the team members how to use their mutant powers in new ways. When his sister Romany Wisdom returns as a villain, Pete Wisdom is apparently murdered. When the remainder of X-Force (with the exception of Domino) are presumed killed, Wisdom is revealed to still be alive. Wisdom's survival is supposedly not known to any members of X-Force.

After M-Day, Wisdom retains his powers and is later ordered by MI-13 to find and team with Captain Britain. He joins New Excalibur. Outside of Excalibur, he works in a strike team for MI-13 that deals with "weird happenings", clashing with MI-6, who feel that is their jurisdiction. As a result of his work, he ends up in an arranged marriage with his teammate Tink (a fairy) to cement a treaty between the United Kingdom and Otherworld. He begins a romance with teammate Maureen Raven, an Ulster-born psychic, but is eventually forced to kill her to end the Martian invasion of Britain.

Following the invasion, Wisdom once again teams with Captain Britain and other heroes to stop the Skrull invasion of Earth. He is contacted by Merlin, who directs Wisdom into setting him free to resurrect a (temporarily) deceased Captain Britain; in doing so, Wisdom has to knowingly open a prison for evil magics (as well as entities like Satannish). Now owed a boon by the dark forces, Wisdom is able to have a magical anti-Skrull shield erected around the British Isles, which leaves the nation under constant threat of the supernatural. Wisdom has to cope with the death of his friend, John the Skrull, who had worked with him and Spitfire to repel the invasion.

MI-13's first battle is against the Duke of Hell Dr Plokta, who gains power when people willingly sell their souls to live in their heart's desire; Wisdom is tempted with the fantasy of Kitty, Maureen and everyone he had gotten killed still being alive. His teammate Captain Midlands betrays them to Plokta in order to live in a fantasy where his wife had not died; disgusted and angry, Wisdom deliberately destroys his fantasy and has him arrested. Understanding how Midlands feels (due to his own losses), Pete shows him some mercy and gives him the chance to commit suicide.

In the United Kingdom's war against Count Dracula, Wisdom takes a key command role. Despite an initial routing, he devises a successful tactic of using misinformation, a staged defeat, a blackmailed Plokta's dream corridors, and pre-emptive strikes to prevent Dracula and his invasion force from realising the UK still has a magical spell that requires a vampire to be invited into its borders. The bulk of the vampire army is destroyed in an instant: Wisdom says that Dracula thought he was playing chess but you would only do so if you "don't care about the pieces... [otherwise] you cheat".

== Powers and abilities ==
Peter Wisdom has the power to absorb ambient heat and solar radiation, and release the absorbed energy from his fingertips as "hot knives" of pure thermal energy, said to be as "hot as the surface of the sun". He can leap from high distances and use the thermal energy to slow his descent. He can fire his hot knives as projectiles, or leave them attached to his fingertips like claws for close physical combat. He also has years of experience in espionage from working for Black Air and British Intelligence.

== Reception ==
In 2014, Entertainment Weekly ranked Pete Wisdom 97th in their "Let's rank every X-Man ever" list.

== Other versions ==
=== Age of Apocalypse ===
An alternate universe version of Pete Wisdom from Earth-295 appears in Age of Apocalypse #7. This version is a member of the Knights of Pendragon.

=== Earth-9586 ===
Petros Wisdom / Friar Albion, a member of the Captain Britain Corps from Earth-9586 inspired by Pete Wisdom, appears in Excalibur.

=== House of M ===
An alternate universe version of Pete Wisdom from Earth-58163 appears in Uncanny X-Men. This version is a servant of Brian Braddock, the King of Great Britain.

=== Ultimate Marvel ===
An alternate universe version of Pete Wisdom appears in the Ultimate Marvel series Ultimate Human. This version is a former member of MI6 who was fired after experimenting on himself and transforming into the Leader. This gives him enhanced intelligence, but his enlarged cranium leaves him unable to walk, and requires him to use a head-mounted brace to support his body. After battling the Hulk, Wisdom is killed in an unsuccessful attempt to attack him.
