= Skrull =

Fictional extraterrestrial race

- The Skrulls posing as different characters as seen on the cover of Secret Invasion: Who Do You Trust? #1 (June 2008). Art by Phil Jimenez.

Publication information
- Publisher: Marvel Comics
- First appearance: Fantastic Four #2 (January 1962); Amazing Adult Fantasy #7 (December 1961, retroactive)
- Created by: Stan Lee (writer); Jack Kirby (artist)

Characteristics
- Place of origin: Skrullos; later moved capital to Tarnax IV (destroyed)
- Pantheon: Kly'bn, Sl'gur't, and Zorr'Kiri; Amatsu-Mikaboshi
- Notable members: Known Skrulls
- Inherent abilities: Advanced shapeshifting

The Skrulls (/skrʌlz/) are a fictional race of extraterrestrial shapeshifters appearing in American comic books published by Marvel Comics. They first appeared in Fantastic Four #2 and were created by Stan Lee and Jack Kirby. They originated from the planet Skrullos and their empire is located in the Andromeda Galaxy. Their infiltration of Earth was a major event in the Marvel Comics universe as shown in the crossover event Secret Invasion.

The Skrulls have made numerous appearances in animated television and video games before making their live-action cinematic debut in the Marvel Cinematic Universe film Captain Marvel (2019). Skrulls have also appeared in Spider-Man: Far From Home (2019) and the Disney+ series WandaVision, What If...? (both 2021) and Secret Invasion (2023), and the film The Marvels (2023).

== Publication history ==
Cover of Fantastic Four #2 vol. (Jan, 1962) Featuring the first appearance of the Skrulls, art by Jack Kirby.

The Skrulls first appeared in Fantastic Four #2 and were created by Stan Lee and Jack Kirby. The Skrulls next appear in Fantastic Four #18. The four who impersonated the members of the Fantastic Four next appear in The Avengers #92. The concept of the Skrulls would be explored and used throughout multiple storylines, spin-off comics, and derivative projects.

The Secret Invasion storyline involving the Skrulls technically began with Secret Invasion #1 in April, 2008 and concluded with Secret Invasion #8 in December, 2008, several tie-ins featuring Skrulls (either openly or in disguise) date as early as 2004.

According to the official Marvel website, "The Complete Event" consists of 98 comics set during the invasion and an additional 5 in the immediate aftermath. Of these, 35 have Secret Invasion or a variant thereof in the title. An omnibus of all these titles was published in 2018 and consists of 728 pages.

== Fictional history ==
Millions of years ago, the Celestials perform genetic experiments on the reptilian ancestors of the Skrulls, resulting in three branches of Skrulls: the Prime, the Deviants, and the Eternals. Eventually, the three branches battled with one another and the Deviant branch – due to possessing the innate ability to shapeshift – were triumphant, and wiped out all members of the other two races until only two were left: the Skrull Eternal Kly'bn, and the Prime Skrull of the original non-Deviant Skrull race. Kly'bn implored them to spare his life, as killing him would kill part of their heritage. The Deviants' leader Sl'gur't eventually fell in love with Kly'bn, with the two eventually becoming the gods of the Skrull pantheon. Taking the name the Prime Skrull, the last original Skrull escaped to Earth in the 20th century and later became a member of the Underground Legion. From that point on, the Skrulls began to expand their territory. The Deviant branch later split into two more groups, the modern Skrulls and an anomaly called the Dire Wraiths.

The Skrulls originated from the planet Skrullos, and were originally a mercantile civilization, primarily interested in free trade and willing to share their technology with all races they deemed worthy.

=== Kree–Skrull War ===
Eventually, the Skrulls developed long-distance space travel; a great tour of the universe was undertaken, led by Emperor Dorrek. Finally, the Skrull delegation reached the planet Hala, home to the then-barbaric Kree and the peaceful Cotati, and held a contest to determine which of the races would represent Hala to the Skrull Empire. Seventeen members of each race were taken to different uninhabited planetoids, where they were left with sufficient supplies for one year. At the end of that period, whichever group had done the most with themselves would be adjudged the most worthy. The Kree were taken to Earth's Moon where they built a great city, while the Cotati were taken to another barren world in a different solar system and used their abilities to create a beautiful park. Realizing that the Cotati were going to win, the enraged Kree killed all of them. When the Kree revealed that they had solved the question of who would represent Hala to the Skrulls by destroying their opposition, the Skrull delegates were appalled and vowed that Hala would be banned from their circle of favored worlds—so the Kree massacred them as well, took over the Skrull landing spaceship by force, and developed their own technology from it.

The Kree–Skrull War continued for thousands of years with only brief interruptions. The Skrull Throneworld is later moved from Skrullos to the more central Tarnax IV, with their empire encompassing over fifty worlds. The Skrulls also created the first Cosmic Cube, which later became the Shaper of Worlds; upon attaining self-awareness, the Shaper lashed out blindly, destroying two-thirds of the Skrull Empire and casting the civilization back into barbarism.

The Kree Accuser Ronan wrests control of the Kree Empire from the Supreme Intelligence and attacks the Skrulls, reigniting hostilities. The Avengers become involved once the Super-Skrull kidnap Captain Marvel. The Supreme Intelligence ends the conflict by revealing to the Avengers' ally Rick Jones that he has vast mental potential, which is then used to freeze all combatants in place. It is revealed years later that the conflict produced a Kree-Skrull hybrid, Hulkling, who was the child of one-time lovers Captain Marvel and Skrull princess Anelle.

=== Empire-changing events ===
In 1958, Skrulls attempt to sabotage Earth's space program. They battle the 3-D Man and set the Cold Warrior against the 3-D Man. In retaliation, Skrull emperor Dorrek VII dispatchs Kl'rt, a Skrull transformed into the Super-Skrull, to Earth to defeat the Fantastic Four. The Super-Skrull poses as Franklin Storm after transporting him to the Skrull Throneworld, and battles the Fantastic Four as the Invincible Man. Another Skrull, Morrat, kills Storm by attaching a bomb to his chest before he is transported back. The Fantastic Four later travel to Tarnax IV and encounter Morrat.

Uatu adjudicates a duel between champions from both races, Colonel Bel-Dann of the Kree and Warlord Raksor of the Skrulls. After one year of conflict, the duel remains deadlocked and is ultimately abandoned without resolution. Years later, during a conflict with Xandar that includes the Fantastic Four and the Champions of Xandar, Dorrek VII's wife R'klll, stages a coup, killing him and becoming ruling Empress. R'klll's reign is short-lived, however, as Galactus destroys Tarnax IV and kills seven billion Skrulls, including R'klll and Princess Anelle.

=== Second Kree–Skrull War ===
Mister Fantastic discovers that another Governor-turned-Emperor, Zabyk, had created a genetics bomb. When it explodes, all Skrulls lose their shapeshifting abilities. In desperation, since they are vulnerable without their powers, the Skrulls kidnap Nova. The Skrull-Xandarian war ends with Nebula destroying Xandar.

=== Cadre K ===
A group of Skrulls travel to Earth, where they begin plotting to invade the planet once again. During this time, they are approached by Apocalypse, who wants to lure together 12 powerful mutants to ascend himself to godhood. At the same time, the body of the Living Monolith, who had been hurled out into the far reaches of space by Thor, is found and brought back to Earth. After the eventual defeat of Apocalypse, Professor X travels into space to train the Skrulls, giving them the name Cadre K.

=== Annihilation ===
The Skrull Empire is the first of the major interstellar empires to be invaded by the forces of Annihilus. The Annihilation Wave's superweapon, the Harvester of Sorrow, physically destroys dozens of Skrull planets. In the aftermath, the Skrulls unsuccessfully attempt to convince Hulkling to become their new Emperor.

=== Secret Invasion ===
In Secret Invasion, a flailing Skrull Empire, under the leadership of newcomer Queen Veranke, make an all-out effort to infiltrate and conquer Earth. It was revealed that the Skrulls had infiltrated Earth by capturing and replacing many of Earth's heroes. They follow this infiltration with their main assault group. This wave of Skrulls forms new versions of the Super-Skrull, with each possessing the abilities of several different heroes. Their invasion ultimately fails, costing the life of Veranke, and reducing their numbers even further. Several of the Skrulls' gods are killed and the god Amatsu-Mikaboshi takes over their Pantheon, leading to the events of Chaos War.

=== Re-establishing the Empire and Infinity ===
The Skrulls, now reduced in numbers, became very segmented with various factions rising up around Warlords. During the Infinity storyline, several planets that the Skrulls settled are attacked and the Skrulls' population is once again decimated. Kl'rt the Super-Skrull represents the Skrull Empire as a member of the Galactic Council. After the Avengers' victory over the Builders and Thanos, Kl'rt becomes the new Emperor of the Skrulls as they settle on Tarnax II. Meanwhile, Cadre K settle on a ranch in South Dakota.

=== Empyre ===
In the prelude to the "Empyre" storyline, Teddy Altman (Hulkling) is made a mysterious offer at the cost of leaving Billy Kaplan. He accepts the offer which was to become the new ruler of the Kree-Skrull alliance, adopting the mantle of Dorrek VIII and beginning the preparations of invading the Earth for "the final war." The Kree and Skrull armies unite to confront the Cotati, who threaten Earth.

== Biology ==
Skrulls are green-skinned reptilian humanoids with large pointed ears, red or green eyes, and chins with several vertical folds in the skin below their mouths. Skrulls are known for genetic and molecular instability and genetic diversity, due to Celestial experimentation creating the Skrull Deviants. The Skrulls are known for their physical malleability and ability to shapeshift to any size, shape, or color at will, taking on the appearance but not the characteristics of other beings and objects. Skrulls are able to assume virtually any form, be it organic (e.g., cows) or inorganic (e.g., lamps). As a result, the Skrulls excel at spying and infiltration. Skrulls are also able to use their shapeshifting abilities to form weapons (e.g., blades and clubs) with parts of their bodies, making them dangerous hand-to-hand combatants. Their sexual dimorphism is roughly the same of a human being, with the exception that the males are mostly bald and have no facial hair, while females have full head of greenish-black hair, but their sexual orientation is more complex, since they can change their genders at will. Indeed, Xavin once casually said that, for a Skrull, changing gender is comparable to a human being changing their hair color. As for their reproductive system, just like the other reptilians, the females do not give live birth, but instead lay eggs and the newborns are known as "hatchlings". Despite being reptilian, the females also possesses hair and mammary glands.

The Skrulls later developed the ability to render themselves undetectable when using their shapeshifting abilities, even from telepaths and those with superior senses. Reed Richards discovered a method to use technology to negate this ability and reveal a disguised Skrull's true form.

Courtesy of their advanced technology, the Skrulls have also been able to augment their abilities in certain warriors, such as the Super-Skrull, Power Skrull and the Warskrulls—all elite groups who, with special encoding, are able to emulate the powers as well as the appearance of their biophysical templates or are bestowed entirely unique supertropical abilities all their own (in the case of Paibok).

The Skrulls have been shown to suffer from various diseases. Some Skrulls are born with a defect that makes them unable to shapeshift, however, this defect also enhances their strength to those Skrulls including Titannus, Talos and Raze.

Just like the Kree, the Skrull were evolutionarily stagnant, unable to evolve. However, over the millennia Skrull mutants have been born with the K-gene (as opposed to the human mutant X-Gene), meaning that they may no longer be stagnant.

After a Skrull dies, they revert to their original form.

== Culture ==
=== Language ===
The Skrull species speak a variety of languages and dialects, including: Skrullos, Skrullian, the Irdu dialect, the Tligi dialect and the Frti dialect. While the Prime Skrulls had their own language, however, it was forgotten as their species was extinct.

=== Art ===
Since the Skrulls are a warrior race, it is hard for them to grasp almost any kind of representational art.

=== Religion ===
The main Skrull religion is the "Dard'van Sect", their "True Faith", which worships Sl'gur't and Kly'bn. It is unknown about the relation between Zorr'Kiri and the actual pantheon.

In Deadpool vs. Thanos #3, it is revealed that the Skrull equivalent of Hell is called the Shapeless Wastes.

== Known Skrulls ==
- Al'arok – A Skrull who posed as a Zenn-Lavian known as "Tallian Pay" to gain entrance for Skrulls to Shalla-Bal; deported after his attempt to kill the Silver Surfer failed; committed suicide to prevent capture by Kree who had disabled the Skrull starship he was on.
- Anelle – Skrull princess and the only child of Emperor Dorrek VII and Empress R´Klll; heir to the Skrull Empire and the mother of the Hulkling (Dorrek VIII/Teddy Altman). Killed when Galactus consumed their Throneworld.
- Aptak – A Skrull trapped in a female Waziliah form by the Hyper-Wave Bomb. She is the lover of Nenora.
- Akilll – A Skrull representative to witness the fate of Phoenix, on trial by the Shi'ar.
- Ard'ran – A fourth-rank Skrull engineer who participated in the Skrull's invasion upon San Francisco. She had the telepathic abilities of any telepathic member of the X-Men.
- Bag'le –
- Bartak – A Skrull who posed as the Silver Surfer.
- Baryn – A Skrull who helped in liberating Prince Dezan.
- Bellok – Member of the "S-Men" also known as the Ice-Boy.
- Broodskrulls – A group of Brood/Skrull hybrids.
- Cadre K – A group of "K-Class Deviant Skrulls" who have powers and physical appearances unlike other Skrulls. They oppose the killing of their kind by the Empire in the name of racial purity. Cadre K was led by Professor X.
  - Fiz – A mutant Skrull who journeyed to Earth to join the X-Men. Fix assisted in the battle against Apocalypse. He led Skrull mutants to rebel against the Slave-Drivers. He left Earth with the others and Professor X to find a new homeworld. Fiz could alter his size and mass.
  - Goroth – A Skrull who possesses elasticity.
  - Nuro – A Skrull who possesses elasticity.
  - R'Tee – A Skrull who can project spikes from his arms and head.
  - Spunje – A Skrull who can absorb and reflect energy.
  - Z'Cann – The leader of Cadre K. She was captured by the Intergalactic Council. Z'Cann is a telepath.
- Carnival – Slavers who were using a carnival to attract and capture humans as slaves. They were encountered by the New Mutants and fled in their starship, but left one behind.
  - Gragnon – Skrull slaver.
  - Rekxorm Sebastian – Skrull slaver.
- Ch'gra – A delegate in Queen Veranke's court.
- Ch'rith – A Skrull Lieutenant who participated in the Skrull's invasion upon San Francisco.
- Chrell – A Skrull Commander entrusted by Queen Veranke to train her army and kill Hulkling. Chrell possessed the combined powers of Mister Fantastic, the Invisible Woman, the Human Torch, and the Thing. Chrell self-destructed trying to eliminate the Young Avengers and the Runaways.
- Criti Noll – A Skrull who was chosen to pose as Hank Pym. The first version tried to warn the diner owner that served her good food, only to be killed by the Skrull posing as Dum Dum Dugan. A second version stays with the cause, also having the combined powers of Black Panther and Vision.
- Dakr't –
- Dalx – Skrull diplomat and cultural attaché.
- De'Lila – A Skrull thief who sought the Inorganic Technodrone. She was then taken by the Skrulls.
- Dezan – The brother of Dorrek VII. He was imprisoned due to his pacifist nature and branded a traitor to the Skrull Empire.
- De'zean – The father of Xavin and the current Prince of Tarvax VII.
- Dharr – A Skrull Lieutenant.
- Dorrek I – A Skrull King who reigned during the Skrull's first encounter with the Kree.
- Dorrek VII – Former Emperor of the Skrulls. Killed by his wife R'Klll.
- Dro'ge – The Skrull Royal Priest of Science. A Skrull scientist who experimented and discovered the advancements that allowed the Skrull Empire to infiltrate Earth on a massive scale.
- Dzirot – A Skrull who participated in the Skrull invasion upon San Francisco. He died in battle.
- Ethan Edwards – A Skrull who was a Marvel Comics pastiche of Superman.
- Evh'ser – A Skrull adjutant who participated in the Skrull invasion upon San Francisco.
- Ewe'fareek – Uncle to Xavin in the comic book Runaways.
- Flaw – A Skrull who served in the Shi'ar's Death Commandos.
- Fremn –
- Fry'lu – A Skrull telepath who existed during the reign of Dorrek VII.
- Galan – The Skrull Priest of Science.
- G'iah –
- Godkiller – A specially-bred female Super-Skrull who has the powers of Battleaxe, Thundra, Titania, and Volcana. She was also genetically modified to wield Beta Ray Bill's hammer, Stormbreaker.
- Gorth – A Skrull who was the governor of a Skrull colony.
- Granok –
- Grrix – The Skrull Ambassador at S.W.O.R.D.
- H. Warren Craddock Impostor – A Skrull who impersonated H. Warren Craddock.
- Hagar – A Skrull who serves as the High Judicator in the Skrull courts.
- Henkor –
- H'kurrek – Fanatical Skrull Commander who commanded the part of the Secret Invasion directed against the X-Men.
- Hokk Algol – A Skrull who is a member of the War Crimes Tribunal.
- Host –
- H'rpra – A Skrull who posed as Mockingbird.
- Hs'fld –
- Hulkling (Dorrek VIII/Teddy Altman) – Theodore "Teddy" Altman, a Kree/Skrull hybrid, the son of Anelle and Mar-Vell. He is a member of the Young Avengers, with the codename "the Hulkling".
- Intelligencia – A Skrull being who was a composite of the greatest Skrull minds. It was created by the Skrulls to serve as their version of the Supreme Intelligence.
- Jaketch – A Skrull who served as an apprentice executioner of the Skrull jury.
- Jaq –
- Jash – A Skrull Lieutenant who participated in the Skrull invasion upon San Francisco.
- Jazinda – A Skrull bounty hunter and the daughter of Kl'rt the Super-Skrull.
- Jora'thrll – A Skrull who participated in the Skrull invasion upon San Francisco.
- K'eel R'kt – A Royal Science Officer of the Skrull Empire and only survivor of the Builders' destruction of the Skrull planet Hy'lt Minor. He was saved by the Silver Surfer and transported to the orbital headquarters of S.W.O.R.D., where he offered his services to them against the war with the Builders.
- K'and'rr – A Skrull Commander of the 7th Fleet.
- K'arr'N –
- K'rtem – A Skrull who was an old comrade of Z'Reg.
- K'Targh –
- Knights of the Infinite – A group of Kree/Skrull hybrids who believed in a prophecy about uniting the two empires and becoming their protectors.
  - Dorrek Supreme – The group's leader and the first wielder of the sword "Excelsior".
  - M'ryn - A member of the group who founded the prophecy and father of Mur-G'nn. Killed by the wizard Moridun to be used as body for the latter.
  - K'kyy – A female member of the group. She assisted in kidnapping Dorrek VIII in order for the latter to become King of the new Empire.
  - Lan-Zarr – A member of the group. He guided Dorrek VIII through the test to see if he was Dorrek Supreme reincarnated.
  - Mur-G'nn – A female member of the group. She assisted in kidnapping Dorrek VIII.
  - Varra – A female member of the group. She is killed by Moridun, who wanted to possess the Wiccan.
- K'vvvr – A Skrull Commander who is the son of K'and'rr. He led the Skrull attack upon Wakanda.
- Kalamari – A Skrull General and ally of Paibok.
- Kalxor – A Skrull who serves as a Commander for Dorrek's armada.
- Karant Kiar – A Skrull Prelate of the Skrull Empire's 7th Quadrant who was a witness at the trial of Galactus.
- Karza –
- K'thron –
- Kerth – A Skrull who was a slave of the Broker.
- Kholdsor –
- Khn'nr – A Skrull who posed as the original Captain Marvel (Mar-Vell). He turned against the other Skrulls.
- Kl'rt/Super-Skrull – A Skrull who had the combined powers of the Fantastic Four and became the first Super-Skrull.
- Kly'bn – The last surviving Skrull Eternal, who became a Skrull god.
- Korya – A female Skrull and the lover of the Yeti.
- Kradhal –
- Kravo –
- Kreddik –
- Krellek Council –
- Krillik –
- Krimonn the Power Prism – A Skrull transformed into a sentient power object after a failed coup d'état.
- Kylak –
- Kylor – A Skrull Governor who was a competitor for the title of Skrull Emperor.
- Lyja – A Skrull who infiltrated the Fantastic Four and married Johnny Storm while impersonating Alicia Masters.
- Magnitude – A Super-Skrull who has the combined powers of Banshee, Havok, Polaris, and Sunfire. He was sent to infiltrate the Point Men until he was exposed and killed by Delroy Garrett.
- Meg'ror –
- Melugin –
- Moloth - A Skrull who is the handler of G'iah and Klrr.
- Morfex – A Skrull who is a member of the Star Masters.
- Morrat – A Skrull Warlord who is responsible for the death of Franklin Storm.
- Mrok – A Skrull soldier.
- M'Lanz – A Skrull Warbride, she was tasked to stop Tel-Kar from retreating his symbiote (Venom) and getting a Skrull bio-weapon after Tel-Kar killed her two sisters. She teamed up with Eddie Brock as the Sleeper to defeat Tel-Kar.
- Muraitak – A Skrull who joined the Xandarian Nova Corps and served under Queen Adora.
- Myrn – A Skrull who is a longtime friend of Zabyk and Dezan and the creator of the Hyper-Wave Bomb. After Myrn had Zabyk don an insulated armor that is said to protect him from the bomb's effects, Myrn was killed by Zabyk.
- N'ala –
- Nenora – A former Skrull spy who was trapped in Kree form after being hit by a Hyper-Wave Bomb. She is the lover of Aptak.
- Nogor – A Skrull who posed as Longshot. He is the talisman of the Skrulls and the representation of the Skrulls' gods.
- Nuro –
- Orf –
- Pagon – A Skrull who posed as Elektra after Siri's demise. Killed by Echo as part of a suicide mission.
- Paibok/Power Skrull –
- Pitt'o Nili – A Skrull who posed as Captain America (and was brainwashed to be him) who came from a downed ship in the Savage Land. Killed by Shanna the She-Devil after being hit by a poisonous dart.
- Prime Skrull – Only surviving member of the original non-Deviant Skrull race.
- Prime Ten – Ten unnamed Skrulls who sought to obtain Mister Fantastic's matter/energy transmitter.
- Ptakr –
- Purnlr – A Warskrull who was killed in battle with the Kree.
- R'Tee –
- Raava – A rogue Skrull pirate who struck back against the Skrull Empire following the deaths of her off-spring, Skragg and Raavaka. In the wake of her carnage, she was sentenced to a lifetime at a secret deep-space torture prison. There, she made acquaintances with fellow prisoners Metal Master, Blinky, Absorbing Man, and Black Bolt, with whom she eventually tried to escape.
- Rachman –
- Raksor – A Skrull who oversaw the Phoenix trial.
- Rale –
- Raze – A Skrull bounty hunter who cannot shapeshift, but is capable with hand-to-hand combat, athletic abilities, and carries an assortment of knives and guns. He is the brother of Vranx.
- Replica – A young female Skrull who was part of the Guardians of the Galaxy.
- Ripan – A Skrull who was a second-in-command to Kylor.
- R'Klll – Wife of Dorrek VII. She killed her husband and took over the Empire in his place. She was apparently killed when Galactus consumed Tarnak IV but turned up alive, having posed as Tanalth the Pursuer.
- R'Kin – A short Skrull who served as fleet mechanic. Even though he is small, he has super-strength.
- Rl'nnd – Son of Rm'twr. Rl'nnd is an undercover X-Skrull agent participating in the Secret Invasion. He has displayed the combined powers of several X-Men. Killed by Ms. Marvel.
- Rm'twr – Father of Rl'nnd. He was killed by Ms. Marvel.
- Ryga'a – Wife of Kree Soh-Larr and mother of Dorrek Supreme.
- S'Bak – A Skrull Baroness.
- Samuel J. Skrull –
- Sar T'llrk – A Skrull "Soul Shepherd" who participated in the Skrull invasion upon San Francisco. Killed by Cyclops.
- S'Byll – A Skrull Empress who restored the Skrull's shapeshifting ability.
- Sarnogg – A Skrull who is the son of Kl'rt.
- The Sensational Hydra – A Skrull spy who works for Hydra.
- She-Thing Impostor – An unnamed Skrull who posed as the She-Thing. Killed by the Skrull Kill Krew.
- Siri – A Skrull who impersonated Elektra. She was killed by the real Elektra.
- Skragg – A Skrull pirate/mercenary who served Thanos.
- The Skrull Beatles – A group of Skrulls who posed as the Beatles.
  - John the Skrull – A member of the Skrull Beatles who impersonated John Lennon and also served as a member of MI: 13.
- Skrull-X – A Skrullian robot who can mimic the powers of the X-Men in a manner similar to Mimic.
- The Skrulls of Kral – A group of Skrulls the planet Kral.
- "Skrullverine" – An unnamed Skrull working for Apocalypse who was used to replace Wolverine at the time when Apocalypse turned Wolverine into the Horseman Death. This Skrull was later killed by Death.
- Skypii – An elderly Skrull mechanic who was friends with Hercules 2300. Often assumed female form and was working as a human female model when he and Hercules first met. As the "retirement plan" for Skrull workers was execution, he went into hiding in the form of a human female. Skypii chose a statue of Hercules to be his "death-form" in eternal tribute to his friend.
- Sl'gur't – A Skrull Deviant who became a Skrull Goddess and mate to Kly'bn.
- Ssrov – A Skrull Dropshift Captain who participates in the Skrull invasion upon San Francisco.
- St'kr –
- Syrro – A Skrull major.
- Talos the Untamed – A Skrull who cannot shapeshift. However, the mutation that left him unable to shapeshift gave him an enormous amount of strength.
- Tarna – A Skrull who is part of the Agents of Cosmos. She had a symbiote partner until Agent Venom became enraged and nearly killed it while stealing a ship, burning it with the ship's engine.
- Tenelle –
- Titannus – A Skrull who cannot shapeshift, but has been bio-engineered to possess immense strength and regeneration ability.
- Trall –
- Trl'k –
- Valth –
- Velmax (Effigy) – Founder of the superhero team the First Line; posing as a human hero, Effigy, with shape-shifting powers.
- Veranke – The current Skrull Queen. She posed as Spider-Woman. Killed by Norman Osborn.
- V'lrym –
- Vranx – A Skrull technology user and brother of Raze.
- Warpriest Kh'oja – A ruthless fanatic and an enemy of Power Pack.
- The Warners – A group of Skrull spies posing as an ordinary American family to make way for a future invasion.
  - G'iah - A Skrull General who operated on Earth as Gloria Warner.
  - Klrr - A Skrull Colonel and G'iah's wife, who operated on Earth as Carl Warner. He was later killed by Moloth.
  - Alkss - The middle daughter of G'iah and Klrr, who operated on Earth as Alice Warner.
  - Ivy Warner - The youngest daughter of G'iah and Klrr.
  - Madison Warner - The oldest daughter of G'iah and Klrr.
- The Warskrulls – A bunch of genetically-bred Skrulls who infiltrated the Shi'ar's culture to obtain power for the Skrull race.
- Wor'il – Delegate in Dorrek's War Council.
- Xalxor –
- Xavin – A Super-Skrull in training and a member of the teenage superpowered group the Runaways. Xavin is the child of Prince De'zean of the Skrull planet Tarvax VII.
- X'iv – A Super-Skrull assassin sent to assassinate the Hulkling. She has the combined powers of Cloak and Dagger as well as Daredevil and Elektra.
- Yorak –
- Y'tll –
- Zabyk – A Skrull warrior who was a childhood friend of Dezan and Myrn. He had Myrn construct a Hyper-Wave Bomb to use on his enemies. Under the advice of Myrn, he donned an insulated armor (even shifting his form to fit the unusual shape of its interior) that would protect him against its effects, but it failed, leaving his contorted body frozen inside and placing him in agony.
- Zankor – An alien retconned into a Skrull.
- Zedrao – A high-ranking Skrull General, notable for being on good terms with Earth's superhumans. He gave the dying Mar-Vell the Royal Skrull Medal of Honor, the highest honor in the Skrull military, for being a worthy rival.
- Zirksu – A Skrull spy who assumed the alias of Diabolik.
- Zkrodd – A Skrull General.
- Z'Reg – A Skrull who deserted his kind. He was formerly a member of the Initiative as Crusader.
- Zuhn – A Skrull who was the partner of Velmax.
- Zorr'Kiri – The Skrull goddess of love. Killed by Gorr the God Butcher.

== Reception ==
- In 2018, CinemaBlend included Skrulls in their "5 Marvel Villains We'd Love To See In Black Panther 2" list.
- In 2022, CBR.com ranked The Skrulls 9th in their "Black Knight's 10 Strongest Villains" list.

== Other versions ==
=== Amalgam ===
In Amalgam Comics, the Skrull are the native inhabitants of Mars (having amalgamated DC's Green Martians with the Skrulls).

=== Earth X ===
In the alternate universe limited series Earth X, Thanos dwelled in the Realm of the Dead with the entity Death. It is revealed his mother was a Skrull and Death used her secret to make him believe that Death was his mother.

=== Squadron Supreme ===
The Skrullian Skymaster (real name Skymax) is a founding member of the Squadron Supreme and possesses abilities matching the Super-Skrull from Earth-616. The character first appeared in flashback in Squadron Supreme #1 (1989), and appeared in more detail in Squadron Supreme: New World Order.

On Earth-712, the Skrull Empire has been at war with the Kree Empire. In an attempt to end the bloodshed, the Skrull Empire created a means to imbue their soldiers with extraordinary powers to vanquish the Kree. Skymax was the first and the only soldier subjected to the experiments, because the World Devourer destroyed the Skrull homeworld. Sk'ym'x was in the vicinity of Earth when his starship malfunctioned. He was rescued by American astronaut Joe Ledger (who would later become Doctor Spectrum). Grateful for his rescue, Skymax gave Ledger a Power Prism, which Ledger used to become the costumed adventurer Doctor Spectrum, while Skymax became the costumed adventurer known as the Skrull. Skymax and Ledger both became founding members of the Squadron Supreme, and Skymax remained with the team until member Tom Thumb repaired his ship, allowing him to return to space. Skymax realized that the damage to his ship was beyond repair despite Tom Thumb's efforts, and he chose to remain on Earth in secret, searching for any possibility of other Skrull survivors. Not finding any, Skymax concluded that he was indeed the last of his race; he remained on Earth.

=== Ultimate Marvel ===
In the Ultimate Marvel reality, Skrulls are led by the billion-year-old Skrull Emperor Kl'rt, as their off shoot Chitauri exist whom they call terrorists. They have extremely advanced technology, but have not been observed to shapeshift. These Skrulls were seen only in an alternate timeline in which Reed Richards contacted their world via his teleporter; the events leading to that timeline were altered in Ultimate Fantastic Four #29 so that contact was never made.

=== MC2 ===
In the MC2 universe, Torus Storm, the son of Lyja and Johnny Storm, is a Skrull/human hybrid who inherited the powers of both his parents.

=== Thirty years into the future ===
In an alternate timeline set 30 years into the future, the Skrull Empire was united with the Kree empire under the rulership of Emperor Dorrek VIII and they were successful in eliminating all life on Earth.

=== What If? ===
==== Secret Invasion ====
On Earth-10021, the Skrulls were victorious in the end of Secret Invasion and the heroes were defeated. In this reality, the Skrulls were coexisting along with the humans on Earth and were seen by humans as people with good intentions. Despite helping the humans in medical care and technology, in reality, they are secretly turning the humans into Skrulls like themselves, including Norman Osborn, who had married Queen Veranke, while the heroes had been hiding in Wakanda, since now they were seen as criminals. In the end, the heroes spread a virus which killed every Skrull and the humans who had been turned into Skrulls, except for Osborn, who had been disguised as Iron Man. Osborn revealed that he had orchestrated the plan all along, but he was killed by Bucky Barnes. The heroes were then taken by the U.S. government as world criminals.

== In other media ==
=== Television ===
- The Skrulls appear in Fantastic Four (1967).
- The Skrulls appear in Fantastic Four (1978).
- The Skrulls appear in X-Men: The Animated Series.
- The Skrulls appear in Fantastic Four (1994).
- The Skrulls appear in Silver Surfer.
- The Skrulls appear in Fantastic Four: World's Greatest Heroes.
- The Skrulls appear in The Super Hero Squad Show.
- The Skrulls appear in The Avengers: Earth's Mightiest Heroes as part of an adaptation of the Secret Invasion storyline.
- The Skrulls appear in the Avengers Assemble episode "Mojo World".
- The Skrulls appear in Hulk and the Agents of S.M.A.S.H..

=== Marvel Cinematic Universe ===
The Skrulls appear in media set in the Marvel Cinematic Universe:

- They are introduced in the film Captain Marvel (2019). A faction of Skrull refugees led by Talos seek to escape a genocidal war waged by the Kree by coming to Earth to seek the aid of renegade Kree scientist Mar-Vell in devising a light-speed engine that could take the Skrulls to safety. On Earth, they meet Maria Rambeau and Nick Fury. After Kree warrior "Vers" learns of her true identity as Carol Danvers, she helps defend Talos, his wife Soren, and the other Skrull refugees from a Kree attack before they leave Earth to find a new planet to settle on.
- In the film Spider-Man: Far From Home (2019), Talos and Soren pose as Fury and Maria Hill respectively while Fury is working with other Skrulls in space.
- A Skrull appears in a mid-credits scene of the WandaVision (2021) episode "The Series Finale", portrayed by Lori Livingston. They appear in Westview, New Jersey disguised as an FBI agent to inform Monica Rambeau that an old friend of Maria's needs help for an upcoming mission.
- Alternate timeline versions of the Skrulls appear in the What If...? episode "What If... Thor Were an Only Child?" They attend Thor's Earth party alongside various other aliens and amuse Thor by assuming his appearance.
- The Skrulls appear in the series Secret Invasion. Fury and Talos join forces to tackle a plot by a rogue Skrull sect led by Gravik (portrayed by Kingsley Ben-Adir) to infiltrate and take over Earth that also involved enlisting scientists to help establish the Super-Skrull project. These rogue Skrulls have kidnapped world officials and replaced them, including James Rhodes/War Machine and Everett Ross. Talos tells Fury that following the Blip, he summoned one million Skrull refugees to live on Earth. Angry that Fury failed in his promise to take care of them, Gravik orchestrates several terrorist attacks across many continents, kills Hill, Soren, Talos, and other Skrulls who try to rebel against him, and attempts to instigate World War III. He and G'iah, Talos's daughter, use a machine to acquire the DNA from some Avengers, some Guardians of the Galaxy, the Black Order, and other enhanced individuals to become Super-Skrulls. G'iah ultimately kills Gravik, Fury kills Raava, Rhodes's imposter, and the rogue faction becomes defunct. In response to the invasion, the U.S. President initiates the Anti-Alien Act deeming Skrulls and other aliens public enemies. G'iah is recruited into MI6 while Fury's wife, Varra, joins him in space with S.A.B.E.R..
- The Skrulls appear in the film The Marvels (2023). They were refugees on the planet Tarnax and made a peace conversation with the Kree, organized by Fury, but before the arrival of Danvers, Monica Rambeau, and Kamala Khan, the treaty was dissolved. After Kree leader Dar-Benn makes a jump point with a Quantum Band by mining Tarnax's atmosphere into Hala to restore its air, the remaining Skrulls are evacuated by Valkyrie.
- Alternate timeline versions of the Skrulls appear in Marvel Zombies. In the second episode, they are a motorcycle bandit gang who attack Shang-Chi's survivor crew to steal their cows, only to be killed by them.

=== Video games ===
- Skrull Governor Kylor, identified as "Emperor", appears as a boss in Silver Surfer (1990).
- The Skrulls appear in Marvel: Ultimate Alliance. When Galactus attacks the Skrulls' homeworld, the heroes are forced to fight his Punishers and Skrulls who refuse to believe that the heroes came to stop Galactus. After helping the Skrull Empress escape the planet, the player has the option of destroying Galactus' Optonic Drills before they destroy the Skrull homeworld. If the player stops the drills, the Skrulls will form a tentative partnership with Earth and will later come to their aid when the Kree threaten to enslave humanity. Otherwise, the loss of their homeworld will destabilize the sector of space it originally occupied and the Kree and Skrull go to war for decades, at the cost of millions of lives.
- The Skrulls appear in Fantastic Four: Rise of the Silver Surfer.
- The Skrulls appear in Marvel Super Hero Squad: The Infinity Gauntlet.
- The Skrulls appear in Marvel Heroes.
- The Skrulls appear in Pinball FX 2.
- The Skrulls appear in Marvel Avengers: Battle for Earth.
