= Revolutionary War (comics) =

Comic book storyline

- Cover to the Revolutionary War collected edition, art by Mark Brooks.

Publication information
- Publisher: Marvel Comics
- Title(s): Revolutionary War: Alpha; Revolutionary War: Dark Angel; Revolutionary War: Knights of Pendragon; Revolutionary War: Death's Head II; Revolutionary War: Super Soldiers; Revolutionary War: Motormouth; Revolutionary War: Warheads; Revolutionary War: Omega
- Formats: Original material for the series has been published as a set of one-shot comics.
- Genre: Superhero
- Publication date: March - May 2014
- Number of issues: 8

Creative team
- Writer(s): Alan Cowsill; Glenn Dakin; Andy Lanning; Rob Williams
- Artist(s): Brent Anderson; Rich Elson; Gary Erskine; Tom Palmer; Nick Roche; Will Sliney
- Editor(s): Stephen Wacker

Revolutionary War is a comic book storyline published by Marvel Comics. It was released as a set of eight one-shot issues between March and May 2014, and was created to celebrate the 20th anniversary of the end of Marvel UK's short-lived attempt to break into the American comic market, addressing several story points that had been left unresolved due to the mass cancellation of the imprint in 1994.

== Creation ==
In 1992, Paul Neary took over as editor-in-chief of Marvel's British division. He planned an ambitious expansion for the company that included exporting a large number of titles to the booming American market. After initial success the line was expanded but encountered problems by 1993, when the American direct market rapidly collapsed. Marvel UK attempted to weather the storm by cancelling many series; however, this was not enough and the company cancelled the remaining titles in 1994, going out of business shortly afterwards. The abrupt nature of rescheduling and cancellation left numerous series without resolution. Following the end of the imprint the majority of the characters launched went into a long period of dormancy.

Some 15 years later several Marvel UK characters reappeared in the acclaimed Captain Britain and MI13 in 2008, followed by several prominent appearances by Captain Britain in series such as Secret Avengers and Uncanny X-Force. Revolutionary War meanwhile followed up on characters from cancelled titles Dark Angel, Knights of Pendragon, Death's Head II, Super Soldiers, Motormouth and Killpower and Warheads. Editor Stephen Wacker teased the series via Twitter in September 2013. Writer Andy Lanning claimed he had been agitating Wacker to greenlight the series for a year, ever since he realised the anniversary was approaching. The series was announced at 2013's San Diego Comic-Con.

Former Marvel UK editor Alan Cowsill joined Lanning as to write the storyline. He also created the character Agent Keller for the story, who was later used as a character in the 2019 Marvel Cinematic Universe film Captain Marvel. Irish artist Nick Roche, a self-confessed fan of the original Death's Head, was assigned to draw the Death's Head II issue. Due to most of the characters having spent two decades in obscurity the duo were given considerable creative freedom by Marvel in terms of story content. However, for space reasons they were unable to feature all the characters they wanted, with Black Axe, Death Wreck and Wild Thing among those that missed the cut. While Captain Britain and Pete Wisdom were created separately from the 1990s-era Marvel UK characters, Lanning included both in the story as he felt it would be "sacrilege" to do a British-set series without them. The more recently created MI-13 would also feature in the storyline. Lanning hoped that the series would be successful enough to see the characters feature in future Marvel comics.

== Publication history ==
The storyline was released across eight one-shots - Revolutionary War: Alpha was issued in January 2014, followed by the six individual titles and closer Omega in March. Simon Coleby was originally announced as artist for the Knights of Pendragon issue, but instead Will Sliney drew the issue.

== Plot ==
Workers at a Crossrail construction site in Canary Wharf come under attack from Mys-Tech Psycho-Wraiths. Captain Britain and Pete Wisdom arrive and make short work of the creatures, but their return has attracted the attention of S.H.I.E.L.D. Captain Britain, Wisdom and M.I.13's Commander Hunter meet with S.H.I.E.L.D.'s Nick Fury and Agent Keller at The Shard, where they explain the incident is one of several recent revivals of Mys-Tech bases, despite the organisation having seemingly been defeated when an alliance of British superheroes foiled their attempt to sacrifice the population of Britain to Mephisto at the Battle of London Bridge. The group decides to recruit the surviving veterans of the conflict to combat the resurgence of Mys-Tech; Wisdom and Keller locate Colonel Tigon Liger, the sole surviving member of the Kether Troop. Initially a drunken mess, Liger pulls himself together after being reunited with his sentient gun Clementine. Captain Britain meanwhile travels to Darkmoor Castle to recruit Dark Angel - only to be attacked and captured by erstwhile ally Death's Head II.

Inside the castle, Dark Angel is troubled by a series of visions and learns of Captain Britain's kidnapping. She is still paying off her father's debt to Mephisto and has to attend to him before she can begin a search, and is further delayed when Psycho-Wraiths attack Darkmoor. She drives them off, though her friend Doris is injured in the battle. She attempts to make a new deal with Mephisto for more power to fight Mys-Tech but he instead sells her out to the Psycho-Wraith Prime.

In the Lake District, former Knights of Pendragon Dai Thomas and Kate McLellan are investigating an Omni Corporation fracking operation, while their old team-mate Union Jack takes Wisdom to Avalon so they can warn Albion of Mys-Tech's return. They find the Green Knight overgrown just as Kate and Dai discover the real reason for Omni's fracking - a door containing Zombie King Arthur and his Zombie Knights of the Zombie Round Table. Albion, Jack and Wisdom arrive from Avalon to help in the battle. Wisdom grabs Zombie Excalibur and takes it to Avalon, using it to free the Green Knight - who takes on the aspect of Mo Farah and crushes the Zombie Knights.

Death's Head II delivers Captain Britain to Psycho-Wraith Prime at Darkmoor Research Centre, only for Mys-Tech to renege on the deal and send their troops to attack him. Overwhelmed, he sends a distress call thousands of years in the future to his companion Tuck, who is destroying an illegal robot research facility on the planet Eopia with aid from the original Death's Head, who head back in time after receiving the signal. In Darkmoor, A.I.M. scientist Doctor Evelyn Necker is allowed to investigate Death's Head II for her Minion project, and spots her future self in the cyborg's memories before she is interrupted by the arrival of Tuck and Death's Head. She sets Death's Head II on them, having reactivated the Minion core programming, but Death's Head's attempts to kill his successor instead restore his usual personality. Necker unleashes her mass-produced Death's Head 3.0 robots on the trio, but Death's Head II destroys them all after installing a Trojan programme in them. Necker escapes, capturing Death's Head. Death's Head II reveals discovering the Mys-Tech base was his reason for betraying Captain Britain.

Three of the Super Soldiers - Guvnor, Gog and Dalton - are starring in a film about themselves in Scotland, with their leader Major Hauer as technical advisor. Wisdom arrives on set to warn them of Mys-Tech's return shortly before the Psycho-Wraiths Killmuzzle, Big Gunz and Andrea DWarKin attack Edinburgh. The chance to get in on some real action delights the Super Soldiers - though it is a ploy to draw Hauer out. Realising this, he attempts to draw them away while Wisdom evacuates nearby civilians. The rest of the Super Soldiers refuse to leave him behind, but Hauer is captured.

After her partner Killpower was lost during the Battle of London Bridge, Harley Davis (Motormouth) is living under the radar in poverty with her telepathic daughter Victoria and son Albert in South London. Keller and Liger search for her but she avoids their calls, and the Psycho-Wraiths discover Harley first. She gives her children her teleporting trainers so they can get to safety before fighting off the intruders. Her resolve strengthened, she takes Liger's call, hoping to find a way to recover Killpower.

The Psycho-Wraiths succeed in capturing the Pendragons, though Dai is able to get a warning to Liger first. He is haunted by the loss of his team, and meets with occultist ally Master Key (a.k.a. Albert Swinburne) who believes he has located the rest of Kether Troop in Hell. They locate a gateway to the team at the hidden thirteenth floor of the Shard. However, it is a trap - Keller has also been taken over by Mys-Tech, who plan to use the captured Captain Britain, Dark Angel, Dai Thomas, Death's Head, Albion and Hauer to power a new Monotrace Core, only needing Swinburne to complete the process of bringing Hell to London - led by Mephisto's new chosen one, the corrupted Killpower.

Killpower leads Mephisto's army through the Core's main wormhole into the Shard, opposed by Wisdom and a rag-tag group of British-based heroes. Mephisto's forces also prevent the X-Men, the Avengers and the Guardians of the Galaxy from intervening. Liger is able to free the heroes captured at the Core, and a pummelling from Captain Britain allows Keller's personality to resurface. However, the group are attacked by the embittered Killpower. Motormouth turns the battle, returning from Hell with Kether Troop and the other heroes lost in the Battle of London Bridge. Her scream allows Killpower to briefly shake off Mephisto's influence and he begs to be killed before the group guns him down. Dark Angel uses the last of her power to close the wormhole to Hell. Afterwards, Motormouth loudly rebuffs Fury's attempts to recruit her; Liger and Keller slip away to search for Kether Troop; Mephisto tells Dark Angel that the release of the energies from the banished Mys-Tech servants clears her debt; Tuck, Death's Head and Death's Head II leave the planet; Dai returns to policing while the rest of the Pendragons head to cleanse Avalon and Hauer meanwhile receives a new post as head of S.H.I.E.L.D.'s European division. While in France the Guardians of the Galaxy are incorrectly credited with saving the world, the British heroes celebrate in London.

== Collected editions ==
Title	ISBN	Release date	Contents
Revolutionary War	9780785190165	28 May 2014	Revolutionary War: Alpha, Dark Angel, Knights of Pendragon, Death's Head II, Super Soldiers, Motormouth, Warheads, Omega

== Reception ==
Jesse Schedeen reviewed Revolutionary War: Alpha for IGN and was also broadly impressed, feeling the issue did well to deliver a large amount of exposition required for the story. Zack Wilkerson of Multiversity Comics was more reserved; despite enjoying the premise he felt the opening issue lacked impact.

Philip Tibbetts of Den of Geek was positive about the complete series, especially for its political commentary of "the changing nature of Britain and Britishness", and enjoyed the way the series was structured to show off the various characters.
