= Spider-Man Comics Weekly =

- Spider-Man Comics Weekly #1 published in 1973.

Publication information
- Publisher: Marvel UK
- Schedule: Weekly
- Format: Ongoing series
- Genre: Superhero
- Publication date: Feb. 10, 1973 - Dec. 1985
- No. of issues: 157
- Main character: Spider-Man

Spider-Man Comics Weekly was a Marvel UK publication which primarily published black-and-white reprints of American Marvel four-color Spider-Man stories. Marvel UK's second-ever title, Spider-Man Comics Weekly debuted in 1973, initially publishing "classic" 1960s Spider-Man stories (as well as Thor backup stories).

The title proved to be a great success. Along with Marvel UK's flagship title, The Mighty World of Marvel, Spider-Man Comics Weekly helped Marvel gain a foothold in the (at the time) vast UK weekly comic market, allowing the company to cross-market and later introduce non-superhero UK-reprint titles such as Planet of the Apes and Star Wars.

Although it changed its title name several times over the years (mostly due to other less successful Marvel UK comics merging with it), the Spider-Man weekly comic eventually became the longest-running Marvel UK publication, publishing 666 issues from 1973 to 1985.

== Publication history ==
During the course of its run, the book was successively known in the indicia as:

- Spider-Man Comics Weekly — issues #1–#157 (Feb. 10, 1973 – Feb. 14, 1976)
- Super Spider-Man issues #158–#310 (Feb. 21, 1976 – Jan. 17, 1979)
  - with the Super-Heroes — issues #158–#198 (Feb. 21, 1976 – Nov. 24, 1976)
  - and the Titans — issues #199–#230 (Dec. 1, 1976 – July 6, 1977)
  - and Captain Britain — issues #231–253 (July 13, 1977 – Dec. 14, 1977)
- Spider-Man Comic — issues #311–333 (Jan. 24, 1979 – July 25, 1979)
- Spectacular Spider-Man Weekly — issues #334–#375 (Aug. 1, 1979 – May 1980)
  - and Marvel Comic — issues #334–#336 (Aug. 1, 1979 – Aug. 15, 1979)
- Spider-Man and Hulk Weekly — issues #376–#449 (May 1980 – Oct. 1981)
  - (incorporating) Team Up — issues #418–#449 (March 1981 - Oct. 1981)
- Super Spider-Man TV Comic — issues #450–#499 (Oct. 1981 – Oct. 1982)
- Spider-Man — issues #500–#633 (Oct. 1982 – May 20, 1985)
  - and His Amazing Friends — issues #553–#578 (Oct. 12, 1983 – Apr. 4, 1984)
- The Spider-Man Comic — issues #634–#651 (May 27, 1985 – Aug. 1985)
- Spidey Comic — issues #652–#666 (Aug. 1985 – Dec. 1985)

=== Spider-Man Comics Weekly ===
Due to the character's popularity in Marvel UK's first title, The Mighty World of Marvel, Spider-Man was made the star of his own weekly comic in early 1973. A full story from the monthly The Amazing Spider-Man was published each week. The backup strip featured Thor reprints, from Journey into Mystery, including some of the Tales of Asgard. From #50, Spider-Man stories would be split, usually running over two consecutive weekly issues. Iron Man stories from Tales of Suspense were added from issue #50, with occasional filler strips from Amazing Adult Fantasy, World of Suspense, Mystic and Not Brand Echh. The first issue also promoted the UK branch of Marvel's new in-house fan club, FOOM.

=== Super Spider-Man ===
In early 1976 the short-lived Marvel UK title The Super-Heroes was merged into Spider-Man Comics Weekly, which at that point changed its title to Super Spider-Man with the Super-Heroes. The book also changed orientation to become a landscape-format comic, following the lead of another relatively new Marvel UK title, The Titans. Although this format allowed two pages of Marvel US artwork to fit onto one (magazine-sized) Marvel UK page, reader reaction was mixed, as it made the text small and often difficult to read.

In addition to the continuing stories of Spider-Man, Thor, and Iron Man, Super Spider-Man with the Super-Heroes started out with X-Men backup stories. It soon, however, continued The Super-Heroes comic’s tradition of rotating less-popular characters like Doctor Strange, Tales of Asgard, and Moon Knight; before settling with The Invaders. Also from The Super-Heroes came reprint stories from Marvel Two-in-One starring the Thing, which had been running in later issues of the comic before the merger (as well as Spider-Man stories from Marvel Team-Up).

In late 1976, the Spider-Man weekly comic absorbed another cancelled Marvel UK title into its pages: The Titans. Following the precedent of the earlier merger with The Super-Heroes, with issue #199 the book changed its title again, to Super Spider-Man and the Titans. A line-up of Spider-Man, Thor, Iron Man, Invaders, Captain America, and the Avengers meant that some weeks Captain America appeared in three different strips. The book continued using the landscape orientation until the penultimate edition of Super Spider-Man and the Titans (#229), when it reverted to the traditional "portrait" format — just in time for the next merger.

In 1976 Marvel UK had debuted its first original weekly series, starring the British superhero Captain Britain. Captain Britain Weekly lasted 39 issues, to July 6, 1977. With Super Spider-Man's July 13, 1977, issue, #231, it absorbed the lead strip of Captain Britain Weekly and changed its title again, to Super Spider-Man & Captain Britain.

The title's main features were now black-and-white reprints of stories from the American The Amazing Spider-Man comic, with new eight-page black-and-white Captain Britain stories. The last six issues under the title Super Spider-Man and Captain Britain (issues #248-253) replaced the new Captain Britain strips with a reprinting of Marvel Team-Up #65 & #66. (Note: Marvel Team-Up #65 bears a cover date of January 1978. During this period, comics published by Marvel Comics carried a cover date three months in advance of the actual date of publication. This means the actual publication date of Marvel Team-Up #65 was October 1977. The first issue of Super Spider-Man and Captain Britain to feature the storyline was published on November 8, 1977.)

As well as Spider-Man and Captain Britain, Thor and the Avengers continued from Super Spider-Man and the Titans while the Fantastic Four joined from Captain Britain weekly, only to depart after a few months to headline their own comic, The Complete Fantastic Four. With issue #254 (Dec. 21, 1977), the Captain Britain feature was dropped and the Captain America stories continued; the book's title became simply Super Spider-Man, retaining that name until issue #310.

=== Spider-Man Comic ===
In 1978, British editor Dez Skinn was hired by Stan Lee to take over the now ailing Marvel UK. Skinn revamped all of Marvel UK's titles, including Super Spider-Man. He changed the title to Spider-Man Comic and gave it a new look, more similar to the outward appearance of "traditional" British weekly comics. Although original US artwork was reprinted, as in previous publications, panels were often chopped up, re-arranged, removed or reduced in size to both meet the lower page count and look more like existing British comics.

In addition to Spider-Man, the title featured five backup strips, starring the Fantastic Four, the Avengers, Thor, the Sub-Mariner, and Nova. The Avengers went on to become the longest-running backup series in the weekly Spider-Man comic.

=== Spectacular Spider-Man Weekly ===
The summer of 1979 saw the demise of the weekly comic formerly known as The Mighty World of Marvel (changed since the Skinn era to Marvel Comic), and the cancelled weekly was merged into Spider-Man Comic. The new title was called The Spectacular Spider-Man Weekly and Marvel Comic for three issues, and then reverted to the shorter Spectacular Spider-Man Weekly for the rest of its 41 issues. Backup stories now featured Daredevil and Godzilla (who moved over from the defunct Marvel Comic), but no longer included the Avengers (who moved to the new Marvel UK monthly title, Marvel Superheroes Monthly).

=== Spider-Man and Hulk Weekly ===
The Hulk was another Marvel character with great popularity in the UK. After co-starring for many years in the pages of The Mighty World of Marvel, the Hulk was given his own weekly title, Hulk Comic, in 1979. However, with the May 1980 cancellation of Hulk Comic after 63 issues, it was merged into the Spider-Man title, which became Spider-Man and Hulk Weekly from issues #376–449. Backup stories featured the two main characters' female counterparts, Spider-Woman and She-Hulk, as well as The Defenders (which was continued from Hulk Comic). Spider-Woman and The Defenders were later replaced by Spider-Man team-up stories and Showcase (a strip that spotlighted superheroes who had not had a solo strip before) after the Marvel Team-Up UK weekly merged with the Spider-Man weekly comic. The cover initially indicated the merger by being titled Spider-Man and Hulk Weekly Incorporating Marvel Team-Up, but this was later abbreviated to Spider-Man and Hulk Team-Up.

=== Super Spider-Man TV Comic ===
Spider-Man #500 (Oct. 6, 1982)

The 1977–1979 The Amazing Spider-Man live-action television series inspired yet another title change, in October 1981; the Spider-Man weekly also changed to more of a magazine format, with photo essays, reader comments, contests, and the like (as well as the obligatory reprints of Marvel US material). The format also changed to 28 pages with 8 pages of colour - a marked difference to others titles when almost all UK comics were still black and white except for their covers and perhaps the centre spread. The colour pages were printed on a glossier paper. Only the Spider-Man strip ran during these issues.

=== Spider-Man (and His Amazing Friends) ===
With issue #500, the title changed its name again, to just Spider-Man, with the page count now increased to 36. Back-up stories returned, as well; initially this was the Hulk following the merger of the second volume of The Incredible Hulk Weekly into Spider-Man. Spider-Woman backup stories returned with issue #517 and the Fantastic Four returned in issue #529.

The debut of the animated series Spider-Man and His Amazing Friends (1981–1983) on BBC One inspired the latest title change in October 1983. The logo remained the same, but the words "and His Amazing Friends" were added around it. Initially the back-up strips were an adaption of the first episode of the cartoon (co-starring Iceman and Firestar) and the continuing Fantastic Four strips. Later these were replaced by Thor, and the X-Men from issue #567 (Jan. 1984). With issue #578, the title again reverted to Spider-Man and eventually began continuing stories from the short-lived Marvel UK title The Thing is Big Ben (referring to the Thing).

Issues #607–#610 featured original Spider-Man stories by Mike Collins, Barry Kitson and Mark Farmer. The stories took place in London and featured Spider-Man battling Assassin-8.

=== The Spider-Man Comic ===
At the time, in late 1984, the British audience for the comic was skewing younger, just as the readers of the American Spider-Man comics were skewing older. With issue #631, the series began reprinting stories featuring Spider-Man's controversial black costume, and fearful of losing readers, Marvel shortly thereafter stopped running reprints of the American material. Initially the title reprinted Spider-Man stories from give-away issues in US newspapers — starting with the 1983 Spider-Man, Firestar and Iceman comic from the Denver Post — but shortly after these stories were replaced with tales for younger readers from the pages of the American title Spidey Super Stories, backed up by strips such as Wally the Wizard — renamed Willy the Wizard for the UK — and Fraggle Rock from the Marvel US children's imprint Star Comics. These were supplemented by short comedy strips by Lew Stringer, such as Snail-Man. Later issues also featured reprints of the two-page The Dukes of Hazzard strip from TV Comic coinciding with repeats of the TV series being aired in the UK.

=== Spidey Comic ===
With the August 1985 name change to Spidey Comic, the title solidified its targeting of younger children. Finally, in December 1985, the Spider-Man weekly published its last issue, #666.

== Annuals and specials ==
Even after the demise of Spider-Man Comics Weekly, Spider-Man annuals continued to appear on a yearly basis, continuing from their 1974 debut through 1986, and then from 1990–1992, with a Spider-Man and Hulk Omnibus annual in 1983. Spider-Man Summer Specials were published from 1979–1987, and Winter Specials from 1979-1985. A Spider-Man Poster Collection was issued as a Winter Special in 1991. A Spider-Man Holiday Special was published in 1992.

Marvel UK published 28 issues of a digest-sized book titled Spider-Man Pocket Book between March 1980 and July 1982. Following that title's cancellation, the early Spider-Man stories it was then reprinting continued for a few months in the pages of the short-lived Marvel UK title The Daredevils.

== Successor titles ==
=== Spider-Man and Zoids ===
On March 8, 1986, Marvel UK launched a new Spider-Man reprint weekly comic, called Spider-Man and Zoids, with new numbering. In a link with Spider-Man Comics Weekly, Spider-Man and Zoids was described as "volume 2". The only original material featured the Zoids, a tie-in with the toys of the same name. Spider-Man and Zoids was notable for featuring early work by Grant Morrison, including the epic and apocalyptic Black Zoid storyline. The new title lasted only 51 issues until February 16, 1987.

=== The Complete Spider-Man ===
Marvel UK tried other vehicles for Spider-Man, including 1990's The Complete Spider-Man (a US-comic-sized monthly reprinting material from the American monthlies running at the time: Spider-Man, Amazing Spider-Man, Spectacular Spider-Man and Web of Spider-Man). The Complete Spider-Man was launched shortly after the first issue of Todd McFarlane's adjectiveless Spider-Man title in the US.

=== The Exploits of Spider-Man ===
The Exploits of Spider-Man was a UK-comic-sized monthly featuring current Spider-Man stories, classic Spider-Man stories, Spider-Man 2099 and Motormouth reprints.

== The Astonishing Spider-Man & other Panini UK titles ==
As from issue six of The Astonishing Spider-Man, all of Marvel UK's titles were produced by Panini UK. At the time Marvel had acquired Panini which absorbed all European reprints. Marvel later divested Panini but it retained the license to publish comics under the Marvel brand in the UK. Panini UK added several biweekly and monthly titles, including The Spectacular Spider-Man (for younger readers), Ultimate Spider-Man (later Ultimate Spider-Man and X-Men after a merger), and Spider-Man and Friends (for very young readers). The Spectacular Spider-Man, was launched to accompany Spider-Man: The Animated Series, which began broadcasting in the UK in the mid-90s. Initially, the stories were simply reprints of the US comics based on the series, but eventually the title moved to all-new UK-originated stories, marking the first Marvel UK material featuring classic Marvel characters to be produced since early 1994. Following Marvel's divestment of Panini, the latter was asked to stop producing new Marvel superhero material.
