= Bernie Jaye =

British comics creator and editor

Bernie Jaye (born Bernadette Jakowski) is a British writer, editor, colorist, and letterer in the comic book industry. She was editor-in-chief of Marvel UK in the early 1980s, and is the co-creator of Dark Angel.

In the spring of 1980, Jaye was named editor-in-chief of Marvel UK, replacing Dez Skinn. Under Jaye's supervision, Captain Britain got his own strip in the pages of the relaunched monthly title Marvel Superheroes (formerly The Mighty World of Marvel), as written by Dave Thorpe and drawn by Alan Davis. (Thorpe left in 1982, to be replaced by Alan Moore in one of Moore's first major ongoing strips.) In October 1981, inspired by the success of its Doctor Who title, Marvel UK began publishing a monthly Blake's 7 title, initially edited by Stewart Wales (and later by Jaye). However, as the television series itself went off the air in late 1981, the magazine itself lasted less than two years. Despite initially launching a flurry of new weeklies, by 1982 the company moved mainly to monthly titles such as Jaye's The Daredevils. The Daredevils featured Moore and Davis's Captain Britain; it subsequently won the 1984 Eagle Award for "Best New Title (UK)." However, many of Marvel UK's titles wouldn't last long before being combined or canceled outright due to poor sales. Jaye left the company in 1983.

During the rest of the 1980s, Jaye freelanced as a writer, colorist, and letterer. For Marvel Comics, she colored Nick Fury vs. S.H.I.E.L.D.and then Nick Fury, Agent of S.H.I.E.L.D.. Returning to British comics in the early 1990s, she lettered stories for Revolver and Crisis, both published by Fleetway.

Reuniting with Marvel UK in 1992, Jaye co-created Dark Angel with artist Geoff Senior, and wrote the Hell's Angel/Dark Angel title from 1992 to 1993. She co-created the strip Mother Earth with Paul Neary and Cliff Robinson, which ran in 2000 AD in 1993.

Jaye has not worked in the comics industry since the mid-1990s.

== Bibliography ==
As writer.

- (with Geoff Senior) Overkill #1–6 (Marvel UK, Apr. 24, 1992–July 3, 1992)
- (with Geoff Senior and Bryan Hitch) Hell's Angel #1-5 (Marvel UK, 1992)
- (with Salvador Larroca and David Hine) Dark Angel #11–13 (Marvel UK, 1993)
- (with Paul Neary and Cliff Robinson) Mother Earth, 2000 AD #867-872, 1993
