= Cam Smith (artist) =

British comics artist

- Areas: Penciller, Inker
- Notable works: Supergirl; The Incredible Hulk; The Amazing Spider-Man

Cam Smith is a British comic book artist and inker known to British comic book readers for his work on 2000 AD and in the American comic book market for his collaborations with Ed McGuinness and Gary Frank, inking that would earn him an Eisner Award nomination.

== Biography ==
Cam Smith, also known as Smudge, is a British comic book artist. He began his career in 1988 working for Harrier on their title Harrier Preview. He has worked for almost every major comic book company, from Dark Horse Comics to Marvel Comics. His first work with DC Comics was in 1995 on the Batman Chronicles title. His work on Supergirl earned him a Will Eisner Comic Industry Awards nomination in 1997. Working as a comic book artist was something he would continue to do over the years, moving on to work on 2000 AD. Here, he got his big break inking the pencil art of fellow British artist Gary Frank on the Motormouth title, that would be renamed Motormouth and Killpower. The inking talent from this work would go on earn Smith an Eisner Award nomination. From this collaboration, Smith became widely known to the American comic book market as well. Their art team would quickly move on to join writer Peter David for a long run on The Incredible Hulk at Marvel Comics in 1993, and then in 1997 they reunited over to DC Comics for the start of the Supergirl series. The artists then moved on to the Image Comics imprint Wildstorm where they began work on Gen^{13} in late 1997.

His other work includes Action Comics, Bishop Vol.1, Detective Comics, Green Lantern, Superman and X-Men.

== Bibliography ==
Comics work includes:

- The Transformers #254 (with Simon Furman, Marvel UK, January 1990)
- "Teenage Kicks" (with Paul Cornell, in Doctor Who Magazine #163, August 1990)
- Motormouth #1-4 (inks, with writer Graham Marks, and pencils by Gary Frank, Marvel UK, June–August 1992)
- Motormouth and Killpower #4-7 (inks, with writer Graham Marks, and pencils by Gary Frank, Marvel UK, September–December 1992)
- Bloodseed (inks, with writer Paul Neary, and pencils by Liam Sharp, 2-issue mini-series, Marvel UK, October–November 1993)
- The Incredible Hulk #403-422 (inks, with writer Peter David, and pencils by Gary Frank, Marvel Comics, March 1993 - October 1994)
- X-Men #43, 45-47, 50, 52-53 (inks, with writer Fabian Nicieza, and pencils by Paul Smith, Marvel Comics, August 1995 - June 1996)
- Detective Comics #711 (inks, with writer Chuck Dixon and pencils by Graham Nolan, DC Comics, July 1997)
- Supergirl #1-9, 13-20 (inks, with writer Peter David (1-9) and Darren Vincenzo (13-20), and pencils by Gary Frank (1-9) and Leonard Kirk (13-20), September 1996 - May 1997, September 1997 - April 1998)
- Gen^{13} #25-42 (inks, with writer John Arcudi (25-41) and Joe Casey (42), and pencils by Gary Frank (25-41) and Kevin Maguire (42), Wildstorm (Image Comics), December 1997 - August 1999)
- Superman #154-157, 159-168, 170-173, 175, 177-178, 181-186 (inks, DC Comics, March 2000 - November 2002)
- Tharg's Future Shocks:
  - "Holed Up" (with Richard McTighe, in 2000 AD #1249, 2001)
  - "Given to Fly" (with Simon Spurrier, in 2000 AD #1257, 2001)
- Sinister Dexter (with Dan Abnett):
  - "Night of the Living Dude" (in 2000 AD #1269, 2001)
  - "Animal Firm" (in 2000 AD #1296-98, 2002)
  - "Big Game" (in 2000 AD #1343-1344, 2003)
  - "Scare Tactics" (in 2000 AD #1397-1399, 2004)
- Action Comics #793.798, 800, 803-810 (inks, DC Comics, September 2002 - February 2004)
- Gen^{13} (vol. 2) #2-3 (inks, with writer Chris Claremont, and pencils by Alé Garza, Wildstorm (DC Comics), December 2002 - January 2003)
- Detective Comics #790-794, 798-800 (inks, DC Comics, March 2004 - January 2005)
- Tharg's Terror Tales: "Keeping it Real" (with Al Ewing, in 2000 AD #1386, 2004)
- The Dark Judges: "Judge Fear's Big Day Out " (with Simon Spurrier, in Judge Dredd Megazine #224, 2004)
- The Last Defenders (inks, with co-authors Joe Casey/Keith Giffen, and pencils by Keith Giffen/Jim Muniz, 6-issue limited series, Marvel Comics, May–October 2008)
- Fantastic Four #535-543, 561-568 (inks, Marvel Comics, April 2006 - March 2007, January–August 2009)
- New Mutants #1-4 (inks, with writer Zeb Wells, and pencils by Diogenes Neves, Marvel Comics, July–October 2009)
- The Incredible Hulk #603-604 (inks, with writer Greg Pak, and pencils by Giuseppe Camuncoli, Marvel Comics, December 2009 - January 2010)
- X-Necrosha: The Gathering: "Mortis" (inks, with writers Craig Kyle/Christopher Yost and pencils by Kalman Andrasofszky, Marvel Comics, February 2010)

== Awards ==
- 1997: Nominated for "Best Inker" Eisner Award, for Supergirl
