= Overkill (comic book) =

Publication information
- Publisher: Marvel UK
- Schedule: Bi-Weekly, later monthly
- Format: Ongoing series
- Publication date: 24 April 1992 – 24 August 1994.
- No. of issues: 52

Overkill was a Marvel UK anthology published during the 1990s, deliberately designed as a Marvel equivalent to 2000AD.

Originally there was an editorially-directed policy of no Marvel US superheroes appearing in Overkill (meaning it could only reprint 11 pages of each Marvel UK story, excising 11 that had deliberate US guest-stars) - market research indicated this was counter-productive and the policy was dropped, with Death's Head taking a prominent role in the comic.

== Titles ==
- Death's Head II
- Knights of Pendragon
- Motormouth
- Dark Angel
- Digitek
- Warheads
