= Geoff Senior =

British artist (born 1960)

- Born: 1960 (age 65–66)
- Area: Artist
- Notable works: Transformers

Geoff Senior (born 1960) is a British artist, best known for his work in the comic book field in the 1980s, mainly for Marvel UK. Senior is perhaps best known for his art for the Marvel Transformers series.

== Biography ==
Senior illustrated the 1985 book Space Assassin. He debuted on the British Transformers title drawing #42, and became one of the title's most prolific and popular artists (always inking his own pencils), thanks to his geometric style, which perfectly suited the dynamics of the series. He worked on a number of other titles for Marvel UK, including Doctor Who Magazine (1988), Dragon's Claws (which he co-created with Simon Furman, and drew all ten issues of), Death's Head (another character he helped create, initially as a guest star for Transformers) and Action Force Weekly, as well as several Marvel UK annuals. He followed Furman across to Marvel USA in 1989, drawing Transformers US #61, and four more issues before the title's cancellation, including the classic #75. He drew several other titles in the early 1990s, including Hell's Angel (later renamed as Dark Angel) and several issues of What If...?, as well as returning to Transformers for the final few issues of Transformers Generation 2.

Since then, Senior has largely worked in advertising, though he has returned to Transformers on occasion, for the 1997 BotCon convention comic Reaching the Omega Point, two illustrations for the Transforce convention book Alignment, several covers for Titan Publishing's series of Transformers trade paperbacks, and the cover of issue 1 for Panini's 2003 UK title Transformers Armada.

The Senior/Furman team returned for the first issue of Titan Comics' (UK) Transformers in August 2007, in which Senior produced the art for a new story based on the live-action movie characters and events (subsequently reprinted by IDW Publishing in the US).

From 2012 to 2014, Senior provided retailer-incentive variant covers for IDW's Transformers: Regeneration One comics, which continued the Marvel U.S. Transformers series, and was a contributing interior artist to Regeneration One #0.

In 2019 Senior and Simon Furman published their own comic, To the Death, which lasted for ten issues.

== Bibliography ==
Comics include:

- Doctor Who (Marvel UK):
  - "The Fabulous Idiot" (with Steve Parkhouse in Doctor Who Magazine Special Summer 1982)
  - "The Crossroads of Time" (with Simon Furman in Doctor Who Magazine #135)
  - "Once in a Lifetime" (with John Freeman, in The Incredible Hulk Presents #1, Marvel UK, 1989)
  - "A Switch in Time!" (with John Freeman, in The Incredible Hulk Presents #6, Marvel UK, 1989)
  - "Slimmer" (with Mike Collins and Tim Robins, in The Incredible Hulk Presents #11, Marvel UK, 1989)
- The Spiral Path (with Steve Parkhouse, in Warrior #3, 1982)
- Time Twisters: "Jogging" (with Alan Grant, in 2000 AD #348, 1983)
- Tharg's Future Shocks:
  - "The Castaway" (with Peter Milligan, in 2000 AD #390, 1984)
  - "The Revenge of the Yallop Cringe" (with Peter Milligan, in 2000 AD #438, 1985)
  - "Mind How You Go" (with Oleh Stepaniuk, in 2000 AD #444, 1985)
  - "Hotel Harry Felix" (with Grant Morrison, in 2000 AD #463, 1986)
  - "Video" (with John Smith, in 2000 AD #478, 1986)
  - "Wheels of Fury" (with Grant Morrison, in 2000 AD #481, 1986)
  - "Brief Encounter" (with Alex Stewart, in 2000 AD #513, 1987)
- Transformers UK #42-43, 83-84, 86, 98, 101, 113, 116, 120, 125, 134, 138, 146-147, 233, 235, 239, 244, 247, 1986 Annual (with Simon Furman, Marvel UK, 1986–1990)
- Zoids (with Grant Morrison, Marvel UK):
  - "Old Soldiers Never Die" (in Spider-Man and Zoids #19, 1986)
  - "Deserts" (in Spider-Man and Zoids #30, 1986)
- Action Force #24-27 (1987)
- Dragon's Claws #1-10 (with Simon Furman, Marvel UK, 1988–1989)
- Death's Head #9 (with Simon Furman, with some pencils by John Higgins, Marvel UK, 1989)
- Transformers #61-62, 65-66, 75 (with Simon Furman, Marvel Comics, 1989-1990)
- Harlem Heroes: "Death Sport" (with Michael Fleisher, in 2000 AD #745-749, 1991)
- Judge Dredd:
  - "The Sleeper" (with John Wagner, in Judge Dredd Yearbook 1992, 1991)
  - "Heatwave" (with Simon Furman, in Judge Dredd: Lawman of the Future #1-2, 1995)
  - "Block War" (with Gordon Rennie, in Judge Dredd: Lawman of the Future #9-10, 1995)
  - "Perp Running" (with Gordon Rennie, in Judge Dredd: Lawman of the Future #10-11, 1995)
  - "In Cold Blood" (with Simon Furman, in Judge Dredd: Lawman of the Future #11-12, 1995)
  - "Cybernetic Jungle" (with Robbie Morrison, in Judge Dredd: Lawman of the Future #15-17, 1996)
  - "Wish You Were Here" (with John O'Donoghue, in Judge Dredd: Lawman of the Future #17, 1996)
  - "First Strike" (with Gordon Rennie, in Judge Dredd: Lawman of the Future #18-20, 1996)
  - "Invasion" (with Gordon Rennie, in Judge Dredd: Lawman of the Future #21-23, 1995)
- Hell's Angel #1-5 (with writer Bernie Jaye and sharing art duties with Bryan Hitch, Marvel UK, 1992)
- Warheads #3 (with John Freeman, Marvel UK, 1992)
- Battletide (with Dan Abnett/Andy Lanning):
  - Battletide (4-issue mini-series, Marvel UK, 1992)
  - Battletide II (4-issue mini-series, Marvel UK, 1993)
- Transformers: Generation 2 #0, 10-12 (with Simon Furman, Marvel Comics, 1993-1994)
- War Machine #9-10 (pencils, with writer Len Kaminski and inks by Pam Eklund, Marvel Comics, 1994)
- Nova vol 2 #8-11 (with writer and co-penciller Chris Marrinan and some inking by Mark Stegbauer, Marvel Comics, 1994)
- Transformers: Saga of the Allspark #1: "Optimus Prime" (with Simon Furman, IDW Publishing, 2008)
- To the Death #1–10 (with Simon Furman, 2019)

Preceded by José Delbo	The Transformers artist 1990	Succeeded by José Delbo
Preceded by José Delbo	The Transformers artist 1990	Succeeded by Dwayne Turner
Preceded by Andrew Wildman	The Transformers artist 1991	Succeeded by Andrew Wildman
