= Knights of Pendragon =

Fictional comic book heroes

The Knights of Pendragon are a fictional team of heroes featuring in comic books published by Marvel Comics. The characters appeared in two series published by imprint Marvel UK between 1990 and 1993. The first incarnation was written by Dan Abnett and John Tomlinson, with art by Gary Erskine. The series featured a mixture of new and existent characters, and takes place in the shared Marvel Universe.

== Creation and publication history ==
The Knights of Pendragon
- The cover to Knights of Pendragon #2, art by Alan Davis.

Publication information
- Publisher: Marvel UK
- Schedule: Monthly
- Format: Ongoing series
- Genre: Fantasy
- Publication date: July 1990 – December 1991
- No. of issues: 18

Creative team
- Written by: Dan Abnett; John Tomlinson
- Penciller: Gary Erskine
- Inker: Andy Lanning
- Editor: Steve White

=== First series ===
The Knights of Pendragon was Marvel UK's third attempt at producing an American-format 'book length' comic series, following Dragon's Claws and Death's Head. Whereas those titles had been science fiction-based action-adventure series, Knights of Pendragon was a highly political and environmental comic, its themes borrowing heavily from British folklore and the growing New Age and neopagan subcultures. Heavy reference was made to Sir Gawain and the Green Knight, a 14th-century chivalric romance. The series was also influenced by growing coverage of environmental activist groups such as Greenpeace; as a result the comic itself was printed on Scangloss, an environmentally friendly paper stock that used half the trees and minimum whitening bleach. The series was Gary Erskine's first ongoing series, following a short story in Marvel UK's anthology Strip.

The series featured extant British-based characters including former Captain Britain supporting character Dai Thomas and Union Jack, a costumed hero originally created by Roy Thomas and Frank Robbins for The Invaders, as well as new creations. It also featured appearances by Captain Britain himself and the Weird Happenings Organisation, both then featuring in the popular American Excalibur series. Promotional adverts featured art by Alan Davis and prominently featured Captain Britain, leading to some complaints when the character's role was more peripheral. Davis himself would later criticise the portrayal of Captain Britain in the series. Union Jack's costume was redesigned to play down similarities between his costume and apparel worn by right-wing groups such as the National Front.

Davis was initially planned to do the series' covers, but after being misinformed about the front page graphic layout withdrew after completing the first five, feeling it was making his work look bad. Instead, a variety of prominent British artists contributed – including Simon Bisley, Mark Farmer, John Bolton, Doug Braithwaite, Colin MacNeil, Dermot Power and Liam Sharp. Initial sales were reportedly strong, leading to the initial planned six issue limited series being extended to an ongoing title. In the title's letters page, "Pendragon to Paper", editor Steve White noted the title had received criticism it was attempting to "batter [the] readers into an ecological submission with saturation attacks each issue". The series received limited distribution in America.

Later issues featured guest appearances by several prominent Marvel superhero characters including Iron Man, the Black Panther, Mister Fantastic and the Invisible Woman. As noted ruefully by the publication's own letters pages, these appearances were not reciprocated by Marvel UK's parent companies beyond a sideways reference in the pages of Excalibur. The series lasted 18 issues – eight more than Dragon's Claws and Death's Head – before finally being cancelled in December 1991.

=== Collected editions ===
Plans to collect the first six issues in a trade paperback while the series was still running ultimately failed to come to fruition. In 2009 Panini Comics, owner of Marvel UK since the company's mid-1990s collapse, issued the first nine issues in a trade in 2009. The rest of the series would be uncollected until 2020, when Marvel issued an oversized omnibus collecting both series of the title.

Knights of Pendragon
- The cover to Knights of Pendragon (vol. 2) #6, art by Alan Davis and Paul Neary.

Publication information
- Publisher: Marvel UK
- Schedule: Monthly
- Format: Ongoing series
- Genre: Superhero
- Publication date: July 1992 – September 1993
- No. of issues: 15

Creative team
- Written by: Dan Abnett; John Tomlinson
- Penciller(s): Phil Gascoine; John Royle
- Inker: Adolfo Buylla

=== Second series ===
Partway through the first series Paul Neary took over from Ian Rimmer as Marvel UK editorial director (effectively the imprint's editor-in-chief). He planned an aggressive tilt at the lucrative American market, and rapidly commissioned a slew of American-format titles, material from which would be featured in anthology Overkill for the domestic market. John Freeman pitched a follow-up called Armageddon Knights in late 1993, but never received a response; the story, which featured Grace and Union Jack, would have wrapped up loose-ends from the preceding series. Instead, Neary instigated a different revival of Knights of Pendragon, initially called (and occasionally referred to for clarity in later material as) Pendragon II. Neary liked the concept of the original series but felt it had lost focus as it progressed. He commissioned original writers Abnett and Tomlinson to make a sequel that made the theme reborn Arthurian heroes more explicit and consistent, while retaining the ecological themes. The new series began in summer 1992.

Erskine was moved over to another new title, Warheads, with Phil Gascoine and Adolfo Buylla the initial art team. The characters were redesigned by Alan Davis to fit the aesthetic Neary was aiming for, while the editor directed the series to tie in with the overarching Mys-Tech plot linking the new Marvel UK series. Like several Marvel UK titles of the period the series crossed over with other Marvel UK titles, including Warheads and Death's Head II, and also featured guest appearances from the parent company's big hitters – with Iron Man in the first four issues, and later Spider-Man. However, like most of the Marvel UK series, the latter went unacknowledged by the American series for the most part, though the characters did feature in a one-off strip in anthology Marvel Comics Presents #122 – written by Skip Dietz and drawn by Hoang Nguyen rather than the usual creative team, and some of the team were used in Davis' take on the Days of Future Past storyline in Excalibur.

The series ended abruptly in 1993 after 15 issues after the summer collapse of the comic market led to mass cancellations of Marvel UK titles.

== Fictional history ==
The team was formed to be agents of the Green Knight, an aspect of the Green Man; a mystical entity representing the natural cycle and spiritual growth. The Knight is in ageless conflict with the Bane, an unnatural destructive force of warfare and winter. The Green Knight invests power, in the form of a possessing spirit bestowing powers, to various groups throughout British history, to protect nature; one such group were the original Knights of the Round Table; the Knights of Pendragon are a modern-day incarnation.

Widowed Scotland Yard inspector Dai Thomas, a sometime antagonist and more recently ally of Captain Britain, is contacted by the W.H.O. (Weird Happenings Organisation) to solve a series of gruesome murders of ecologically based criminals (corrupt farmers, ivory hunters, exotic bird smugglers, and so on). He is soon joined by satellite TV reporter Kate McClellan. Soon both become obsessed with fighting the criminals themselves, and after a series of visions, Dai becomes superhumanly strong and battle-savvy, taking on the aspect of Gawain. The crimes share a common factor – the sinister multinational Omni Corporation, owned by the Bane-controlled Francesca Grace. As Thomas' investigation becomes messier and draws negative attention to Omni, Grace initially assigns heavy Dolph to kill the pair. When he fails, Grace leans on her government connections to have the WHO remove Thomas from the case. He ignores them, so Grace arranges for the British government to send Captain Britain to retrieve the apparently insane Thomas from a cut-down section of the Amazon rainforest, they instead fight, and Britain kills Thomas. However, Thomas and the Captain were possessed by the spirits of Gawain and Lancelot respectively from the time of King Arthur; as such the Captain was destined to kill Thomas in accordance to Arthurian lore, and Thomas is then resurrected. The three of them travel to the Green Knight's citadel, whilst Thomas/Gawain recounts the Green Knight's poem, a pact between man and nature:

"A bargain between man and the great wild force that should stand forever, that neither should take more than he can give back...destroy more than he can replace...strike deep, and refuse to accept a blow in return."

Man had forgotten that pact, and so the Knight was lashing out in pain. Gawain sacrifices his Pendragon power to partially heal the Knight, and also to spark the creation of another Pendragon group.

Thomas' next assignment is to find the identity of vicious, misogynistic serial killer The Jigsaw Man, who is butchering successful women in London. After conferring with Kate and Brian Braddock, they realise the killer is Dolph. Their investigation is side-tracked when Kate's son Cam is imbued with the spirit of the Pendragon and goes missing from his boarding school in Wiltshire. One of the masters at the school is Peter Hunter, a former avatar of the Pendragon himself and secretly the World War I-era patriotic superhero Albion, who aids the search; another ally is the vigilante Joe Chapman, also known as Union Jack. Formerly an unpowered crime-fighter, he has also come under the influence of the Pendragon and contacts Kate searching for answers. Kate discovers she is also gaining powers when she comes under attack from Dolph, but Cam is found by Grace and falls under the influence of Grace. Meanwhile, bestselling author Ben Gallagher is also imbued with the Pendragon after coming across a brutal whale culling while in Orkney. Dai meanwhile is hospitalised when Cam leads a mission to free Dolph from police custody. After an abortive raid on Omni, the current Pendragons – Peter, Kate, Ben and Joe – pool their resources, and realise Grace plans to use a deal with Stark Industries to manifest the Red Knight in Joselito, Spain. However, the Green Knight appears instead, but is little match for the power of the Bane. With the aid of Iron Man, the group are able to keep the Bane at bay long enough for Peter to reach Cam and draw the Pendragon from the boy into himself. Cam returns to normal, and in gratitude Tony Stark funds the group to build a headquarters in Chapman's Cameliard Farm base.

Kate and Ben begin a relationship, much to the chagrin of the jealous Joe, while Grace and the Bane continue their attacks. The Omni Corporation targets Hippopotami near the Congo River in Wakanda, an atrocity that also draws the attention of the Black Panther, fitting new anti-poaching detection units with the help of Mr. Fantastic and the Invisible Woman. Forewarned by visions, Ben, Joe and Kate are in the area investigating, while Peter researches the Bane in Bonn. After stopping the ivory thieves, Union Jack and the Black Panther follow a lead to Hong Kong, while Kate and Ben head to Australia to follow another. However, neither mission goes well – in Kowloon the Black Panther is critically injured and Union Jack is killed by a horribly mutated Dolph, while Ben is mortally injured by another of the Bane's avatars. Albion meanwhile is captured by Grace and used as a sacrifice to manifest the Red Lord. In anticipation, the Green Knight gathers Pendragons from all through time at the Green Chapel, resurrecting Ben, Joe and Peter in the process. Among the others called are the Black Panther, Captain Britain, Iron Man, Dai and Little John, as well as Adam Crown – a young man possessed by the spirit of King Arthur. In the resulting battle the Red Lord and his forces are driven back and Adam purges the Bane from Grace, though the cost is high and Ben is among those killed.

Grace's conversion and subsequent membership in the Knights of Pendragon attracts the attention of Omni's owners, Mys-Tech. While Grace, Adam and Peter explore the Green Chapel in Avalon, Union Jack comes under attack from malfunctioning robots at Questworld, a new Arthurian theme park in Darkmoor. The robot facsimile of Gawain at the park, meanwhile, becomes the vessel for the spirit of Gawain himself. As Questworld features robotics from Stark Industries, Union Jack calls in Iron Man to assist. Afterwards, Union Jack convenes with the other Pendragons, who have found powerful armour in the Green Chapel. The rampaging Gawain robot is tracked by the Black Knight, observed by Mys-Tech agent Magpie and journalist Jane Breeze. When they try to seize the robot the Pendragons and Iron Man intervene, and Gawain joins the team – while Jane explains she had been duped by Mys-Tech. The group convenes at the Green Chapel. Meanwhile, a man called Iain Guthrie is tricked into triggering a nuclear leak at Cape Wrath by the Bane; following Jane's visions the Pendragons arrive and Gawain is able to talk Guthrie into not triggering a full meltdown.

Breeze joins the group. The Pendragons respond to a call for help from the world of Arakne, being attacked by the Warheads. Envoy Arrakyl took the Pendragons to the Gossamer Tower where they found the world's Spider-God resembled Spider-Man, who was under attack from Malekyth. The group were ultimately able to persuade Liger, Misha and Stacy of the Warheads that their attack on Arakne was wrong, and Malekyth was driven off. The Pendragons also battled Shadow Wing, one of the Bane, foiling his plans to complete a devastating spell known as the Seeds of Winter.

Mys-Tech stepped up their campaign against the team by allying with Union Jack's old enemy Baron Blood. Grace feigned returning to the service of the Bane and pretended to lure Union Jack to the Omni Corporation tower as a human sacrifice. However, once he arrived the pair worked together to defeat the vampire. Next Mys-Tech used the Un-Earth to poison the Green Knight, causing chaos in London via the monster Skire, who Adam was eventually able to defeat. With the aid of Death's Head, Wolverine, Dark Angel, Doctor Strange and Professor X the Pendragons were able to prevent Un-Earth from activating.

The Pendragons' work on Arakne had inadvertently damaged Earth-313, and the Lemurians of that world hired Death's Head to kill them in return. The biomechanoid attacked the Green Chapel, briefly allying with Magpie, but eventually realised he had been misled. Death's Head destroyed Magpie and the Pendragons were able to foil another attempt to manifest the Red Lord before aiding the people of Earth-313 in repairing the damage they had done.

When the alien Skrulls invaded Avalon the Green Knight was decapitated by a Super-Skrull and the Pendragon Force was briefly controlled by the Skrulls and redistributed to empower the Skrull soldiers attacking London. With the failure of their invasion, the Green Knight was restored and the Skrulls lost control of the Pendragon Force.

The Pendragons were part of the final battle against Mys-Tech. Years later, Dai, Kate, Union Jack, an elderly Albion, and new ally Pete Wisdom united to stop Omni-Corporation from digging up an old Mys-Tech base in the Lake District. The base contained perverted zombie clones of the original Round Table (complete with "Zombie Excalibur") who wanted to slaughter and return Britain to a distorted Dark Ages, and sent a defeated Albion to Psycho-Wraith Prime. Wisdom turned the tide by reawakening the Green Knight in a new form, representing the best of modern Britain. Albion was used as part of a portal to bring Mephisto's Hell to Earth but the Knights helped stop it. Afterwards, the team disbanded again.

== Collected editions ==
Title	ISBN	Release date	Issues
Knights of Pendragon Volume 1 – Once and Future	9781846534317	October 2009	Knights of Pendragon (Vol. 1) #1–9
Knights of Pendragon Omnibus	9781302931834	13 September 2022	Knights of Pendragon (Vol. 1) #1–18, (Vol. 2) #1-15, Mys-Tech Wars #1-4, Dark Guard #1-4

== Reception ==
Alan Stewart's Arthurian comic guide Camelot in 4 Colors felt the first series was "one of the most intriguing and original Arthurian comics series that has yet appeared", but that the second was much less successful as it strove to be "a more conventional (and commercial) superhero team comic book". In a retrospective review for Now Read This, Win Wiacek described the collection of the first nine issues as "a pivotal moment in British mainstream comics".

Comic Book Resources listed the Pendragons as one of '10 Marvel Teams Built Around Magic'.
