= The Daredevils =

Comic book series

- Cover art for The Daredevils #1 by Paul Neary

Publication information
- Publisher: Marvel UK
- Schedule: Monthly
- Format: Anthology
- Genre: Superhero
- Publication date: January - November 1983
- No. of issues: 11
- Editor: Bernie Jaye

The Daredevils was a comics magazine and anthology published by Marvel UK in 1983. Aimed for a more sophisticated audience than typical light superhero adventures, The Daredevils featured Captain Britain stories by Alan Moore and Alan Davis paired with reprints of Frank Miller's Daredevil stories. It has been speculated this was in response to Dez Skinn's new anthology Warrior.

== Publishing history ==
Editor Bernie Jaye gave writer Alan Moore and artist Alan Davis, rising stars in the comics industry at the time, considerable freedom in terms of the material they produced. Aside from the occasional pull-out posters, all contents were printed in black-and-white, not colour. The magazine had a circulation of around 25,000 copies, and lasted eleven issues before merging with The Mighty World of Marvel.

== Content ==
=== Comic strips ===
==== Captain Britain ====
Always the first story in any issue, Captain Britain continued the "Jaspers' Warp" storyline from Marvel Super-Heroes, which Alan Moore had recently taken over writing with Alan Davis as artist. The strip would be continued in The Mighty World of Marvel after The Daredevils was cancelled.

==== Daredevil ====
Issues from Frank Miller's Daredevil run were reprinted in black and white, giving the series its title. The stories were originally printed in Daredevil (Vol. 1) #159-170.

==== The Amazing Spider-Man ====
Black-and-white reprints of Stan Lee and John Romita material, continued from Marvel UK's Spider-Man Pocketbook series. This feature was dropped after four issues.

==== "Star Death"/"4-D War"/"Black Sun Rising" ====
Reprints of Moore's Doctor Who Monthly strips that introduced the Special Executive, running in #5-7.

==== "Grit" ====
One-off Daredevil spoof by Moore and Mike Collins featured in #8. It was Collins' first professional work.

==== The Origin of the Crusader ====
One-off humour strip by Davis and Paul Neary featured in #9. Originally printed in Hulk reprint title Rampage Monthly #41 in 1981, this was Davis' first published professional work.

==== Earth 33⅓ ====
An occasional three-panel humour strip by Tim Quinn and Dicky Howett.

=== Prose stories ===
==== Night Raven ====
New stories featuring the masked vigilante introduced in Hulk Comic, written by Moore and illustrated by Davis, ran from #6-11.

=== Text features ===
- Moore penned opinion columns including an analysis of Frank Miller's Daredevil in #1, "an affectionate character assassination" of Stan Lee in #4-5 and Invisible Girls and Phantom Women, a text feature on sexism in #4-6.
- Steve Moore contributed pieces on Asian comics in #6-8.
- Convention reports from Hasan Yusuff
- Fanzine Reviews: pieces on comic-related fanzines, again written by Moore.
- Early artwork: profiles of artists including Garry Leach (#1), Jerry Paris (#2) John Higgins (#4), Dave Gibbons (#5) and Alan Davis (#8).
- News Feature: American comic industry news column from Frank Plowright.
- Comic Mart: where readers could post the comics they had on offer and those they wanted.
- Letters: reader letters, including a cartoon sent in by Lew Stringer that would lead to his first professional commission.

== Reception ==
The comic won 'Favourite U.K. Comic' at the 1984 Eagle Awards.
