= MyS-TECH =

Fictional comic book organization

Publication information
- Publisher: Marvel UK
- First appearance: Warheads #1 (June 1992)
- Created by: John Freeman; Nick Vince; Gary Erskine; John Beeston

In-story information
- Owner(s): Algernon Crowe; Bronwen Gryffn; Ranulph Haldane; Eadmund Porlock; Brendan Rathcoole; Gudrun Tyburn; Ormond Wychwood
- Employee(s): Warheads

MyS-TECH (or Mys-Tech (Note: In its original appearances in comics published by Marvel UK, the organization's name was spelled and trademarked as "MyS-TECH". Later publications by Marvel Comics spell its name as "Mys-Tech".)) is a fictional technology company appearing in British comic books published by Marvel UK and American comic books published by Marvel Comics. It is usually depicted as a shadowy Faustian organization. It first appeared in Warheads #1 (June 1992) and was created by John Freeman, Nick Vince, Gary Erskine, and John Beeston.

== Fictional origins ==
The board of MyS-TECH, a multinational corporation, was originally seven mages who in 987 sold their souls to the demon Mephisto in exchange for immortality. The MyS-TECH board members must provide a steady stream of souls to Mephisto to maintain their immortality and contracts with Mephisto. Over the years, the board accumulated power and wealth and in the modern age this power and wealth became a business empire.

== Board members ==
The seven mages who became the board of MyS-TECH were:

- Algernon Crowe
- Bronwen Gryffn
- Ranulph Haldane
- Eadmund Porlock
- Brendan Rathcoole
- Gudrun Tyburn
- Ormond Wychwood

== Headquarters ==
MyS-TECH operated as a respectable business but hidden beneath one of their front organizations, the Museum of Pagan Antiquities at Canary Wharf in London, was a sprawling underground headquarters. These headquarters were used to house the arcane magical technologies the board used to increase their power and keep the supply of souls flowing to Mephisto. Chief amongst these was Un-Earth, a macabre microcosm of the planet used in a similar fashion to a voodoo doll. The headquarters also housed extensive biotech labs. It was in one of these labs that the genetically engineered assassin named Julius Mullarkey, also known as Killpower, was created by MyS-TECH scientist Oonagh Mullarkey. The headquarters were also the base for the Warheads, MyS-TECH's mercenaries who travel through wormholes collecting sophisticated technology for their masters.

== Enemies ==
MyS-TECH featured as villains in many of the titles launched by Marvel UK during their 1990s expansion into the United States. The characters featured in these titles included Dark Angel (previously known as Hell's Angel), Death's Head, the partners Motormouth and Killpower, and the Knights of Pendragon. The Warheads Kether Troop also later went on to rebel against their masters.

The scarred cyborg Badhand has confronted MyS-TECH forces multiple times. Notably, he has spied on the Warheads, allied himself with Nick Fury, and assisted Cable with a theft from MyS-Tech's vaults.

MyS-TECH also came up against other Marvel Comics characters such as the X-Men, although they never appeared outside of the Marvel UK imprint.

== MyS-TECH Wars ==
In the mini-series MyS-TECH Wars (1993) by Dan Abnett and Bryan Hitch, their forces fought most of the Marvel Universe's assembled heroes. In the resulting demonic invasion, many of Earth's heroes (including a majority of the Avengers, Fantastic Four, X-Men, Spider-Man, Ghost Rider, and Nick Fury) were killed. However, due to the surviving heroes' efforts, the entire event was erased from history. As such, only a few, such as Doctor Strange, Professor X, and Motormouth, remember what happened.

In a later attempt to destroy all superheroes, the board transform themselves into younger versions. In the same issue, they cause the formation of the Anti-Being, a psychic being that is the result of their centuries of malice. They try to team up in a bid to dominate all reality but lose the being to Death's Head.

Finally, they attempt to get out of their contract with Mephisto by sending all of Britain to Hell. The country's heroes fought them back at the Battle of London Bridge (later covered up) and took the Museum of Pagan Antiquities, sending the board to Hell instead and leaving the group seemingly gone for good. S.H.I.E.L.D. stepped in to handle the clean-up, keeping MI-13 out of the loop so they could hoard the technology for themselves.

Years later, various MyS-TECH bases became active again and it was believed the group was returning; it turned out instead to be Killpower leading a second demonic invasion, all an elaborate move by Mephisto to end all his MyS-TECH contracts and return all the energies he had tied up in abandoned bases and weaponry.
