= Dark Angel (Marvel Comics) =

Publication information
- Publisher: Marvel Comics
- First appearance: Hell's Angel #1 (July 1992)
- Created by: Bernie Jaye; Geoff Senior

In-story information
- Alter ego: Shevaun Haldane
- Team affiliations: MI-13
- Notable aliases: Hell's Angel
- Abilities: Energy blasts, detection and absorption; Flight; Use of weapons

Dark Angel (Shevaun Haldane), originally Hell's Angel, is a superheroine appearing in American comic books published by Marvel Comics under their imprint Marvel UK. Created by Bernie Jaye and Geoff Senior, the character first appeared in Hell's Angel #1 (July 1992).

== Publication history ==
Dark Angel first appeared in Hell's Angel #1 (July 1992), created by Bernie Jaye and Geoff Senior.

The character and the comic book were both renamed to Dark Angel with issue #6 due to legal threats from the Hells Angels biker club. Their lawsuit was settled by Marvel agreeing to pay $35,000 as a charitable gift to Ronald McDonald House in the name of both Marvel and the Hell's Angels, in addition to renaming the character.

== Fictional character biography ==
In the Middle Ages, the sorcerers who would become the Mys-Tech Board of Directors were granted immortality by the demon Mephisto in exchange for the continued sacrifice of mortal souls. One of these men, Ranaulph Haldane, had a daughter named Shevaun in the modern period. When Shevaun was 21 years old, Mephisto killed her father for betraying him. Shevaun then saw the Angel of Death arrive for her father. The angel placed a fragment of the universe itself within Shevaun and gave her a suit of high-tech body armor to control her new power. She fought Mys-Tech's agents and other techno-magical monsters across the Earth, in other dimensions, and in the afterlife.

She teamed up with numerous other American heroes and anti-heroes in the process, including the X-Men (particularly Wolverine and Psylocke), Hercules, Sabretooth, Doctor Strange, the Fantastic Four and the Avengers, as well as the "soul fragments" of the deceased Nuke and Nighthawk of the Squadron Supreme. She also teamed up with or fought characters Death's Head II, the Knights of Pendragon, the Warheads, Genetix, Wild Thing, and Motormouth and Killpower, and joined several of these heroes in the short-lived team called the Dark Guard.

Shevaun was one of the many superheroes who gathered to fight Mys-Tech in a literal apocalyptic showdown. The organization had created a double of the Earth, which would grant them absolute power over the original one. The heroes would fight their way to the core of Mys-Tech, losing dozens of their own to death and destruction. Shevaun not only had to fight, but she also had to maintain her wildly fluctuating and painful powers to help the cosmos on a level few of her companions understood. In the end, only a small number of heroes were left alive and an even smaller number made it to the devices that could reverse time. Shevaun joined with the group, which included Professor X, Doctor Strange, Albion of the Knights of Pendragon, Death's Head, and Motormouth (the last out of pure need more than anything else) and managed to reverse time just enough so that none of the heroes died and the Earth was not in real danger. The Counter-Earth was blocked off from Mys-Tech and only the heroes who made it to the end actually remembered all the chaos and death that had gone on before.

Dark Angel later reappeared as one of British intelligence agency MI:13's reserve agents, battling against an army of vampires on the Moon. The caption accompanying her reintroduction stated that she was "back from space".

Years later, she fought the Battle of London Bridge against Mys-Tech: the board was trying to get out of their deal with Mephisto by sending all of Britain to Hell. She was forced to have her allies Killpower and Kether Troop trapped in Hell to stop the demons from coming to Earth.

Shevaun found herself stuck with her father's 'karmic debts', as it turned out he'd signed her "in perpetuity" into his deal for power with Mephisto in order to get extra power and wealth; she was forced to work for Mephisto by putting down demonic rebellions which left her with exhausted powers and unable to do much superhero work. Instead, she was left slumped in front of DVD boxsets. Mephisto and the Psycho-Wraith Prime manipulated her into despair and tried to sign a deal of her own, giving up the Dark Angel powers. This saw her tricked and captured, itself a trick so Mephisto could return her full power in the enemy's base and stop a Hell invasion that he had helped set up: it got all his energies tied up in Mys-Tech contracts returned to himself, his debts nullified, and Shevaun left as a near-powerless "Miss Tech Hacker" who would have to deal with the inevitable problems for him.

== Reception ==
=== Accolades ===
- In 2017, CBR.com chose the Hell's Angel version of the character as one of their "15 Superheroes Marvel Wants You To Forget" list.
- In 2020, Scary Mommy included Dark Angel in their "Looking For A Role Model? These 195+ Marvel Female Characters Are Truly Heroic" list.
- In 2022, CBR.com ranked Dark Angel 9th in their "Top 15 British Superheroes in the Marvel Universe" list.
