= Hulk Comic =

1979 comic book ongoing series

Publication information
- Publisher: Marvel UK
- Schedule: Weekly
- Format: Ongoing series
- Genre: Superhero
- Publication date: March 1979 – May 1980
- No. of issues: 63
- Main character(s): Hulk; Nick Fury; Black Knight; Captain Britain; Night Raven

Creative team
- Created by: Dez Skinn
- Editor: Dez Skinn

Collected editions
- Night Raven: The Collected Stories: ISBN 1-85400-227-9

Hulk Comic (later The Incredible Hulk Weekly) was a black-and-white Marvel UK comics anthology published under the editorship of Dez Skinn starting in 1979.

== Publication history ==
After starring for many years in the Marvel UK flagship title, The Mighty World of Marvel, the Hulk was given his own weekly publication. Explaining the thinking behind the comic Dez Skinn said: "I was wanting an adventure anthology title more than a super-hero one. Super-heroes had never been big sellers in the UK, we had plenty of legends of the past to spin fantasies about. So I went that route, picking existing Marvel characters who weren't really cut from the super-hero cloth."

Like many titles published by the company under Dez Skinn, Hulk Comic featured new material produced by British creators such as Steve Dillon, David Lloyd and Steve Parkhouse—along with a smattering of American reprints drawn from the Lee/Kirby Marvel back-catalogue. Once Skinn was replaced by Paul Neary, however, the title's original output dwindled, being supplanted by an increasing number of reprints, in part because the company’s limited creative resources were being redirected towards Doctor Who Weekly.

The title included new Hulk material drawn by Dave Gibbons and Steve Dillon. This material portrayed the inarticulate, wandering Hulk of the 1970s television series. Once the title began featuring American reprints, it featured the Marvel Universe Hulk as depicted by Sal Buscema.

Other original work included Nick Fury also drawn by Steve Dillon and a new Black Knight strip which also featured Captain Britain. These original stories were mostly restricted to the first 20 issues of the title, after which they were replaced by U.S. reprints due to low sales, with only the popular Black Knight strip running through most further issues until the title's cancellation. Hulk Comic launched the character Night Raven by Steve Parkhouse and David Lloyd. Night Raven is one of several Marvel UK characters who eventually made the jump to American comics.

The title lasted 63 issues before merging with Marvel UK's Spider-Man weekly title.

== Original material ==
The following is a list of all the UK-originated strips in the title together with their respective issue numbers.

- The Incredible Hulk, #1-6, 9-20, 26-28
- The Black Knight, #1, 3-30, 42-55, 57-63
- Nick Fury, Agent of S.H.I.E.L.D., #1-19
- Night-Raven, #1-20
- Ant-Man, #48-49

=== Collected editions ===
Some of the original material has been collected into trade paperbacks:

- Hulk: From the UK Vaults (360 pages, Marvel Comics, July 2013, ISBN 9780785159742)
- Night Raven: From The Marvel UK Vaults (280 pages, Marvel Comics, April 2017, ISBN 9781302904623)
- Night Raven: The Collected Stories (64 pages, Marvel Comics, October 1990, ISBN 1-85400-227-9)
- Captain Britain (Panini Comics):
  - Volume 3: The Lion and the Spider (includes Hulk Comic Weekly #1, 3-30, 204 pages, November 2008, ISBN 1-84653-401-1)
  - Volume 4: The Siege of Camelot (includes Hulk Comic Weekly #42-55, 57-63, 258 pages, November 2009, ISBN 1-84653-433-X)
