= Amazing Fantasy =

Comic book anthology

- Amazing Adult Fantasy #7 (Dec. 1961). First issue following title change from Amazing Adventures, cover art by Steve Ditko

Publication information
- Publisher: Marvel Comics
- Schedule: Monthly
- Format: Ongoing
- Publication date: Amazing Adventures #1–6 (June 1961 – Nov. 1961); Amazing Adult Fantasy #7–14 (Dec. 1961 – July 1962); Amazing Fantasy #15 (August 1962); Amazing Fantasy #16–18 (Dec. 1995 – March 1996); Amazing Fantasy (vol. 2) (Aug. 2004 – April 2006); Amazing Fantasy (vol. 3) (Sept. 2021 – Feb. 2022)
- Main character(s): Spider-Man debuted in AF #15 (Aug. 1962); Anya Corazon #1–6; Carmilla Black #7–12; Vegas #13–14; Death's Head #16–20

Creative team
- Written by: (1961–62): Stan Lee, et al. (1995): Kurt Busiek (2004): Fiona Avery, Fred Van Lente, Simon Furman, et al. (2021): Kaare Andrews
- Artist(s): (1961–62): Steve Ditko, Jack Kirby, Don Heck, Paul Reinman, et al. (1995): Paul Lee (2004): Various (2021): Kaare Andrews
- Inker(s): (1961–62): Dick Ayers, et al.

Amazing Adult Fantasy, retitled Amazing Fantasy in its final issue, is an American comic book anthology series published by Marvel Comics from 1961 through 1962, with the latter title revived with superhero features in 1995 and in the 2000s. The final 1960s issue, Amazing Fantasy #15 (cover-dated Aug. 1962), introduced the popular superhero Spider-Man who would go on to become one of the most famous superheroes of all time. Amazing Adult Fantasy premiered with issue #7, taking over the numbering from Amazing Adventures.

== Publication history ==
Spider-Man debuts: Amazing Fantasy #15 (Aug. 1962); cover art by Jack Kirby (penciler) and Steve Ditko (inker).

The science fiction-fantasy anthology Amazing Adult Fantasy began with issue #7 (cover-dated Dec. 1961), having taken over the number of the similar anthology Amazing Adventures. The earlier issues before the title change featured stories drawn by a number of artists including Jack Kirby, Don Heck and Steve Ditko. Amazing Adult Fantasy featured exclusively the quick, quirky, twist-ending tales of artist Ditko and writer-editor Stan Lee that had appeared in Amazing Adventures and sister titles primarily featuring rampaging monsters. The cover of the comic carried the motto "The magazine that respects your intelligence".

Lee in 2009 described these "short, five-page filler strips that Steve and I did together", originally "placed in any of our comics that had a few extra pages to fill", as "odd fantasy tales that I'd dream up with O. Henry-type [twist] endings". Giving an early example of what would later be known as the "Marvel Method" of writer-artist collaboration, Lee said: "All I had to do was give Steve a one-line description of the plot and he'd be off and running. He'd take those skeleton outlines I had given him and turn them into classic little works of art that ended up being far cooler than I had any right to expect".

With issue #15 (Aug. 1962) Amazing Adult Fantasy was retitled Amazing Fantasy. This issue's lead feature introduced the superhero Spider-Man, written by Lee and drawn by Ditko, although Lee rejected Ditko's cover art and commissioned Jack Kirby to pencil a cover that Ditko inked. As Lee explained in 2010: "I think I had Jack sketch out a cover for it because I always had a lot of confidence in Jack's covers". In numerous interviews Lee has recalled how the title had been slated for cancellation, and so with nothing to lose, publisher Martin Goodman reluctantly agreed to allow him to introduce Spider-Man, a new kind of superhero – one who would be a teenager, but not a sidekick, and one who would have everyman doubts, neuroses and money problems. However, while this was indeed the final issue, its editorial page anticipated the comic continuing and that "the Spiderman [sic] ... will appear every month in Amazing".

Regardless, sales for Amazing Fantasy #15 proved to be one of Marvel's highest at the time, so the company launched the series The Amazing Spider-Man seven months later.

The DVD release of the collector's edition of the Spider-Man film included a copy of Amazing Fantasy #15. In 2001, Marvel published the 10-issue historical overview The 100 Greatest Marvels of All Time, with Amazing Fantasy #15 topping the list.

In 2008, an anonymous donor gave the original 24 pages of Ditko art for Amazing Fantasy #15 to the Library of Congress, which included Spider-Man's debut and the stories "The Bell-Ringer", "Man in the Mummy Case", and "There Are Martians Among Us".

=== Continuation in 1995 ===
For decades, no attempts were made to relaunch the title or to continue it with an issue #16. However, in 1995, Marvel editor Danny Fingeroth decided a story gap existed between Amazing Fantasy #15 and The Amazing Spider-Man #1. In an attempt to fill that gap, Marvel published three Spider-Man flashback stories in Amazing Fantasy #16–18 (Dec. 1996 – March 1998), each written by Kurt Busiek and painted chiefly by Paul Lee.

=== Volume 2 ===
Amazing Fantasy #1 (Aug. 2004), featuring Araña; cover by Mark Brooks and Jamie Mendoza.

The second volume of the series ran 20 issues (cover-dated Aug. 2004 – June 2006).

The first arc ran through (vol. 2) #1–6 and featured a new teenaged heroine, Araña. The second arc, in (vol. 2) #7–12, published after a short hiatus, featured a revamped, female version of the supervillain the Scorpion. A back-up feature in (vol. 2) #10–12 (Sept.-Nov. 2005) starred the character Nina Price, the Vampire by Night, and (vol. 2) #13–14 (both Dec. 2005) led with the modern-West feature "Vegas", backed up by "Captain Universe". In an attempt to replicate history, Marvel announced that the new issue #15 would introduce a new generation of heroes in a 48-page standalone issue. These heroes included Amadeus Cho, Blackjack, the Great Video, Monstro, the Heartbreak Kid, and Positron. The cover to #15 was a revamped version of the original Amazing Fantasy #15 cover, complete with Spider-Man swinging through a modern-day New York City, while the new heroes watch in awe in the background.

The final arc, in (vol. 2) #16–20 (Feb.-June 2006), introduced Death's Head 3.0, a revamp of the Marvel UK character, written by the original version's creator, Simon Furman. Issues #18–19 contain two "Tales of the New Universe" stories as backup features, while #20 featured a Western backup, "Steamrider".

=== Volume 3 ===
The third volume ran for five issues (cover dated September 2021 - February 2022). Written and drawn by Kaare Andrews, it follows Captain America, Black Widow, and Spider-Man who wake up on a mysterious island with no memory of how they arrived.

It's revealed that the three main characters underwent a near-death experience; with Captain America going down with a ship, Black Widow being shot in the snow, and Spider-Man being crushed by falling rubble.

On the island, Captain America meets a woman and her unnamed son, which he nicknames America. Spider-Man is found by Uncle Ben and his allies, including a woman named Fey. Black Widow is brought in to act as the island's queen in order to restore peace amongst the warring factions.

The book culminates in an all-out war between the many island factions, and it's revealed that the overarching villain is an alternate version of Peter Parker. He transports Spider-Man to a false version of the past and gives him the chance to save Uncle Ben, but he refuses. Spider-Man has a final conversation with Ben, before the false reality dissipates.

Spider-Man awakens from beneath a large amount of rubble and swings off to stop the Green Goblin. Captain America washes ashore, having saved all of the ship's men, and the cargo; Dr. J. Robert Oppenheimer. Black Widow wakes up in the snow and escapes with her fellow Red Room spies.

On the island, a grown up America fathers a child, the proclaimed prince of the island, named Aether. Meanwhile, Wolverine washes ashore and greets Ben, telling him tales about Peter's adventures as Spider-Man.

== Collected editions ==
=== Volume 1 ===
| Title | Material collected | Published date | ISBN |
|---|---|---|---|
| Amazing Fantasy Omnibus | Amazing Adventures #1–6, Amazing Adult Fantasy #7–14, Amazing Fantasy #15 | July 2020 | 978-1302922702 |
| Untold Tales of Spider-Man Omnibus | Amazing Fantasy #16-18, Untold Tales of Spider-Man #1-25, -1, Annual 1996-1997, Strange Encounter and material from Amazing Spider-Man Annual #37 | May 2021 | 978-1302928612 |
| Untold Tales of Spider-Man: The Complete Collection Vol 1 | Amazing Fantasy #16-18, Untold Tales of Spider-Man #1-14 | November 2021 | 978-1302931773 |

Amazing Fantasy #15 has been reprinted many times, sometimes just reprinting the Spider-Man story.

=== Volume 2 ===
| Title | Material collected | Published date | ISBN |
|---|---|---|---|
| Arana Volume 1: Heart Of The Spider | Amazing Fantasy (vol. 2) #1-6 | January 2005 | 978-0785115069 |
| Arana: Here Comes the Spider-Girl | Amazing Fantasy (vol. 2) #1-6, Arana #1-6 | October 2020 | 978-1302926465 |
| Scorpion: Poison Tomorrow | Amazing Fantasy (vol. 2) #7-12 | November 2005 | 978-0785117124 |
| Captain Universe: Universal Heroes | Material from Amazing Fantasy (vol. 2) #13-14 and Captain Universe: Daredevil, Incredible Hulk, Invisible Woman, Silver Surfer, X-23 | February 2006 | 978-0785118572 |
| Amadeus Cho: Genius At Work | Material from Amazing Fantasy (vol. 2) #15, Incredible Hulk (vol. 2) #100, Incredible Hercules #126,133,135,137 | April 2016 | N/A |
| Death's Head 3.0: Unnatural Selection | Amazing Fantasy (vol. 2) #16-20 | August 2006 | 978-0785121084 |

=== Volume 3 ===
| Title | Material collected | Published date | ISBN |
|---|---|---|---|
| Amazing Fantasy | Amazing Fantasy (vol. 3) #1-5 | April 2022 | 978-1302931483 |

== Sales of Amazing Fantasy (vol. 1) #15 ==
- In September 2000, Metropolis Comics in New York City brought the only known CGC-graded 9.6 (near-mint plus) copy to market and sold it for $140,000.
- In October 2007, a near-mint copy sold for $210,000 in an online auction on ComicLink.com and in 2017 a NM- 9.2 sold on ComicLink.com for $460,000.
- Price results accelerated leading up to Spider-Man: Homecoming and a CGC 8.0 sold for three times the price it has ever sold for before when it hit $261,000 in a ComicLink.com auction in May 2017.
- A near-mint CGC-graded 9.6 copy sold for $1.1 million to an unnamed collector on March 7, 2011, making the issue one of only three comic books to have broken the million-dollar mark (the others being the debut of Superman in Action Comics #1, of which three copies have sold for more than $1 million each; and the first appearance of Batman in Detective Comics #27).
- In June 2015, a record price of $200,000 was paid for an example of Amazing Fantasy #15 in CGC 9.0 condition on ComicLink.com.
- In September 2021, a CGC NM+ 9.6 copy sold at Heritage Auctions for $3,600,000, making Amazing Fantasy #15 hold the Guinness World Record for most expensive comic.

== In other media ==
The first episode of the Disney+ series Your Friendly Neighborhood Spider-Man is named after the comic book series, which also has a reproduction of the last issue ("Amazing Adult Fantasy #14") before Spider-Man's introduction falling off of Peter Parker's face as he is awakened by Aunt May.
