= Paul Neary =

British comic book artist (1949–2024)

- Born: 18 December 1949 Bournemouth, England
- Died: 10 February 2024 (aged 74)
- Areas: Writer, Penciller, Inker, Editor
- Notable works: Doctor Who; The Ultimates; Nick Fury vs. S.H.I.E.L.D.
- Awards: "Best Art Team" Eisner Award (1989) "Favourite Inker" Eagle Award (1989 and 2006)

Paul Neary (18 December 1949 – 10 February 2024) was a British comic book artist, writer and editor.

His first work was for Warren Publishing in the 1970s before working with Dez Skinn at Marvel UK as well as work for 2000 AD. He later became editor-in-chief of Marvel UK in the 1990s but is now best known for inking Bryan Hitch's work on The Ultimates for Marvel Comics.

== Biography ==
His first published work was in Warren's anthology title, Eerie, working on various stories and series including "Hunter" and its sequels, before drawing various Future Shocks for 2000AD for various writers, including Alan Moore.

In 1979 he started working on Hulk Weekly for Marvel UK which had just been drastically revamped by Dez Skinn. During this time he drew various strips for Marvel UK, including Hulk and Nick Fury, plus helping new artists such as Alan Davis. Neary pencilled the Captain America series for Marvel Comics from 1984 to 1987. He drew the first appearances of Mother Superior and the Serpent Society.

During the early 1980s he created Madman for Dez Skinn's Warrior before becoming a regular inker for Alan Davis's work for DC Comics. Their most notable work at this time being a run drawing Batman for Detective Comics.

Neary became closely associated with Davis, inking his work from titles such as Uncanny X-Men to Captain Britain. Their working partnership lasted until his death.

Neary became editor-in-chief of Marvel UK from c. 1990–1993, helping launch a number of US-sized titles in addition to the company's ongoing UK range. This began with Death's Head II and was followed by titles such as Hell's Angel (changed to Dark Angel after a copyright battle with the Hells Angels), Warheads, Digitek and Motormouth (later Motormouth and Killpower). Sales of the comics were initially high but over-expansion soon brought an end to Marvel UK's US line, with Panini Comics buying the company's assets, including Doctor Who Magazine.

Neary had been concentrating on inking since then. He has inked Bryan Hitch's work on The Authority and regularly worked with Hitch on The Ultimates for Marvel Comics.

Paul Neary died after a long illness on 10 February 2024, at the age of 74.

== Awards ==
- 1989:
  - won Best Art Team Eisner Award for Excalibur (with Alan Davis)
  - won Favourite Artist (inker) US Eagle Award
- 1999: nominated for Favourite Comic Book Artist (inking) Eagle Award
- 2000: nominated for Favourite Comic Book Artist (inks) Eagle Award
- 2005: won Favourite Comic Story Eagle Award for The Ultimates volume 2 #1–9 (with Mark Millar and Bryan Hitch)
- 2006: won Favourite Comic Artist: Inks Eagle Award

== Bibliography ==
His comic work (both drawing and writing) include:

- Hulk: "Dr Scarabeus" (pencils, with Steve Moore, and inks by David Lloyd, in Hulk Comic #15–20, Marvel UK, 1979)
- Doctor Who:
  - "The Return of the Daleks" (pencils, with Steve Moore, and inks by David Lloyd, in Doctor Who Weekly #1–4, 1979)
  - "The Final Quest" (with Steve Moore, in Doctor Who Weekly #8, 1979)
  - "K-9's Finest Hour" (with Steve Moore, in Doctor Who Weekly #12, 1980)
  - "Timeslip" (art and script, with co-author Dez Skinn, in Doctor Who Magazine #17–18, 1980)
  - "The Touchdown on Deneb 7" (script), with art by David Lloyd, in Doctor Who Magazine #48, 1981)
  - "Voyage to the Edge of the Universe" (script), with art by David Lloyd, in Doctor Who Magazine #49, 1981)
  - "The Stockbridge Horror" (with Steve Parkhouse, and split art duties with Mick Austin, in Doctor Who Magazine #74, 1983, collected in The Tides of Time, Panini, 212 pages, 2005, ISBN 1-904159-92-3)
- Tharg's Future Shocks (art, with Alan Moore):
  - A Cautionary Fable (in 2000 AD #240, 1981)
  - Twist Ending (in 2000 AD #246, 1982)
  - All of Them Were Empty (in 2000 AD #251, 1982)
  - An American Werewolf in Space (in 2000 AD #252, 1982)
- Madman (script and art, with additional art by Mick Austin, in Warrior #2–7, 1982)
- Abelard Snazz: The Multi-Storey Mind Mellows Out! (art, with Alan Moore, in 2000 AD #254, 1982)
- Ka-Zar the Savage #31–34 (pencils, with writer Mike Carlin and inks by John Beatty/Carlos Garzon, Marvel Comics, April–October 1984)
- The Thing (vol. 1) #34–36 (pencils, with writer Mike Carlin and inks by Kim DeMulder/Sam De La Rosa, Marvel Comics, April–June 1986)
- Adventures of the Outsiders #34 (pencils with Alan Davis and writer Mike W. Barr, DC Comics, June 1986)
- Captain America (pencils or breakdowns, #292–329 & #331, 1984–1987)
- Nick Fury vs. S.H.I.E.L.D. (pencils, with writer Bob Harras, Marvel Comics, 1988)
- Excalibur:
  - Special Edition (1987) #1–9, 12–17, 23–24 (inks, with Chris Claremont, and pencils by Alan Davis, Marvel, 1988–1990)
  - #104–105 (inks, with John Arcudi and Keith Giffen, and pencils by Bryan Hitch, Marvel, 1997)
- Happenstance and Kismet (script, with co-author Steve Parkhouse):
  - Happenstance and Kismet (in Revolver #1–7, 1990)
  - Happenstance and Kismet (continued) (in Crisis #56–61, 1991)
- Bloodseed (script, with pencils by Liam Sharp and inks by Cam Smith, 2-issue mini-series, Marvel UK, 1993)
- Mother Earth (script, with co-author Jaye, and art by Cliff Robinson, in 2000 AD #867–872, 1993)
- The Ultimates (inks, with Mark Millar, and pencils by Bryan Hitch, Marvel):
  - The Ultimates #8–13 (2002–2004)
  - The Ultimates 2 #1–13 (2005–2007)
- Fantastic Four #554–555 (inks, with Mark Millar, and pencils by Bryan Hitch, Marvel Comics, 2008)
- The Authority #1–12 (inks, with Warren Ellis, and pencils by Bryan Hitch, Wildstorm, 1999)

== Notes ==
Preceded by Dez Skinn	Doctor Who Magazine editor 1980–1981	Succeeded by Alan McKenzie
Preceded by Herb Trimpe	Captain America penciller 1984–1987	Succeeded by Tom Morgan
Preceded by Klaus Janson	Detective Comics inker 1986–1987	Succeeded by Alfredo Alcala
Preceded by n/a	Excalibur inker 1988–1990	Succeeded by Al Milgrom
