= Spider-Man and Zoids =

British comic book series

- Cover of Spider-Man and Zoids #49, published Feb. 7, 1987.

Publication information
- Publisher: Marvel UK
- Schedule: Weekly
- Format: Ongoing series
- Publication date: March 1986 - February 1987
- No. of issues: 51

Spider-Man and Zoids was a British comic book series by Marvel UK that was a tie-in with the toys of the same name. The comics anthology included reprints of Spider-Man stories from the US and an original series of Zoids tales to go along with the original UK model kit releases. Spider-Man and Zoids is notable for featuring early work by Grant Morrison, including the Black Zoid storyline.

== Publication history ==
The 1985–1986 Marvel UK title Marvel Super Heroes Secret Wars reprinted the vast majority of the Secret Wars and Secret Wars II sagas (incorporating the Secret Wars II cross-overs in chronological order). Featuring Zoids stories in issues #20–#26, the success of the Zoids storyline prompted the release of their own title, Spider-Man and Zoids.

The series' cancellation with issue #51 occurred during the heart of the Black Zoid storyline, meaning that none of the unfinished plot-lines were ever followed up. A proposed monthly continuation (again written by Grant Morrison, with art by Steve Yeowell) was shelved before publication—however, at least the first half of the aborted issue exists.

== Plot ==
=== Back-story ===
The Zoids were created by a blue-skinned humanoid race named the Zoidaryans, native to the planet Zoidstar. They used these mechanical behemoths to conquer and enslave other worlds in a Zoidaryan empire that stretched into the Earth sector of space. However, the Zoidaryans were a warlike species, and delighted in battle. With no other enemy left to fight, they used their battle machines to fight each other in epic duels to the death. This was considered their golden age, the era of "Heroic Combat", but it began to lead to the extinction of their race. So it was decreed that androids should pilot the Zoids to battle each other, and the Zoidarians would sate their battle-hunger vicariously.

On the outer rim of the Zoidaryan Empire, battle fleets still periodically patrolled their subdued populations. One such battlefleet miscalculated its return to the home system due to a meteor shower, and crashed onto the Blue Moon of Zoidstar. There was a single Zoidaryan survivor, pulled from the wreckage by android technicians, and given a protective exoskeleton to restore his crippled body.

The frigid temperatures of the icy moon incapacitated the marooned Zoids of the battlefleet, and so their androids set about converting them to more resilient forms. It was the conversion of heating up the Zoids for survival that turned them from their original blue to red: the Red Zoid mutants were born. Eventually, the surviving Zoidaryan is able to return to Zoidstar, to find his people had been wiped out by the meteor shower, and that the Zoidaryan automated factories are producing legions of Zoids that continue to battle on, even though their creators have disappeared.

Realizing that he is the last of his kind, the Zoidaryan adopts the moniker "Namer", and gives each of the warring machines an apt title to describe its capabilities. With his naming, the Namer issues a stark prophecy, that when the remodeled Zoids from the Blue Moon return, there will be an ultimate battle.

=== The strip adventures ===
The Red Zoids, led by Redhorn, land on Zoidstar and attempt to seize control of it. Threatened by these outsiders, the Blue Zoids temporarily cease their combat and unite under the mighty Zoidzilla to drive them off. Total war breaks out, with Redhorn forcibly converting Blue Zoids into red. He soon gains a general in Mammoth, a Blue Zoid traitor who willingly converts to Red.

Into this melee crashes the Celeste, a terran starship, in the year 2274. The cargo ship and crew was commandeered to transport prison convicts to Zoidstar, believed to be an uninhabited world where they could build a prison. Arriving in orbit around the planet, the ship was blasted by a fireball, stranding the survivors on Zoidstar, most of whom are quickly gunned down by Zoids. Under the leadership of Captain Drew Heller, the remaining ones band together and are joined by the Namer, and attempt to survive on, and find a way to escape from Zoidstar. Early on, they manage to capture a Spiderzoid and Heller's son Griff becomes its pilot - being the only one who can fit in it - to defend them against other Zoids.

While the Blue and Red Zoids clash, a third force is looming over them. Krark, the ultimate Red Zoid mutation and proclaimed the Prince of Darkness by the Namer, is attempting to band together all of the Zoids. While the two armies are content on beating each other to oblivion, Krark wants to leave Zoidstar behind and build a new Zoid Empire, ruling over the entire Galaxy. He has some success but his plans face resistance from the fact that most of the Zoids do not understand his ideals and just want to keep fighting each other.

Plots would be split between the machinations of Krark, the battles between the Blue and the Red Zoids, and the humans' struggle to survive. There were occasional offbeat tales. One story tells of an elderly Cosmozoid who, now tired of fighting, searches for the fabled Metalon where Zoids go to be granted eternal peace; too late, he discovers Metalon is actually a place for Zoids to spend an eternity of unending combat, and is trapped forever. Another story had a Blue Zoid android and a Red Zoid android realizing the horror of what the Zoids had done to the planets they conquered for the Zoidaryans, but the Blue Zoid android was reduced to impotent protests as his comrades continued their war around him.

The strip later reveals that Silverman, the head of the convict program for which the Celeste was used, is actually an android. He attempts to kill the crew when his identity is revealed and be the only one to escape Zoidstar. It turns out the United States government and the corrupt Cybersol Corporation had known about the Zoids, and the Celeste mission was intended to use everyone on board the ship as guinea pigs, prior to a full-scale operation to capture and duplicate the Zoids for military purposes, all for Cybersol's gain. Heller and Silverman battle in an abandoned Zoid production facility and it is believed Silverman is dead.

Other stories would reveal a second surviving Zoidaryan - Clada - who is self-proclaimed commander of the Blue Zoid army (though considered a mere factory commander by Zoidzilla). An annual story would show Namer and Clada knew each other of old, with the former building the invincible Zrk Zoid that Clada piloted to victory over victory. Clada's arrogance led the Namer to challenge him to Heroic Combat and - knowing Zrk's weak points - defeat him. Their feud would come to a head in the present day, with Namer successful in killing Clada but temporarily losing the trust of the Celeste crew in the process.

Mammoth tricks Redhorn into being gunned down by both Zoidzilla and Krark, allowing for him to assume command of the Red Zoids. Redhorn's android survives though, and he attempts to rebuild his Zoid form, battling the Celeste crew in the process. As the humans gain control of the Great Gorgon, Heller is plagued by nightmares of Silverman and the discovery that one of his arms is bionic, shaking his sense of identity. It is also revealed Cybersol gave him the bionic arm after they caused an accident that severely injured him and killed his wife, Celeste, and that they are now preparing to send a mercenary team to Zoidstar to capture Zoids.

=== The Black Zoid saga ===
Silverman had not been killed and, using the technology from the Zoid factory, constructed a titanic Black Zoid: a being with incredible firepower which constantly sheds an outer shell to reveal a new foe underneath. From issues 40–46, Silverman rampaged across Zoidstar, reduced to a seething hatred and desire to make Heller suffer. Zoidzilla's android pilot is destroyed; the Blue army is reduced to disarray, so the Namer takes command and has them rebuild their leader. The Black Zoid attacks and massacres the Blue forces. The mighty Gore manages to strike it down, but it sheds its outer shell and uses its inner form—armed with a bladed weapon—to behead Gore, and a terrified Heller attempts and fails to stop it in Gorgon. Meanwhile, Krark takes advantage of this (and of Mammoth's incompetent leadership of the Red Zoids) to form his united Zoid army.

Griff pilots Zoidzilla against the Black Zoid, almost losing his mind in the process due to a dangerous mental interface, and his firepower initially takes down the Black Zoid, only for its next inner form—armed with wings—to bring him down. At this point, Krark turns up with his alliance and a vicious air battle brings down the Black Zoid. However, the Black Zoid revives with its final inner form—a walking head—but is finally struck down by a giant welding device from a Blue Zoid factory that the Namer and the Celeste crew managed to use as a weapon. Silverman then emerges from the wreckage to attack Heller directly, but is beaten to death by Heller.

The next few issues involve the mercenaries preparing to invade Zoidstar on behalf of the Cybersol Corporation; Griff battling for control of his mind against Zoidzilla's influence from the mental interface and suffering amnesia; The Celeste crew and Heller continuing to work to survive with the Namer on Zoidstar; Redhorn making his return and killing Mammoth for control of the Red Zoids, but with the possibility that he too will return; the Blue Zoids rebuilding; a new kind of "Renegade" Zoids that are created by automated Zoid factories to fight Krark's army; and Krark gaining new recruits as his plans begin to move forward. Issue 50 also revealed a strange alien lifeform was behind the Zoid Wars, and assumingly using it for something worse, all as part of "a game", with the entire universe as "their playroom", with everyone and everything in it "nothing but toys", and that, most daunting of all, "the game is about to begin".
