= Killpower =

- Killpower promotional artwork

Publication information
- Publisher: Marvel UK
- First appearance: Motormouth #1 (June 1992)
- Created by: Gary Frank; Graham Mark

In-story information
- Alter ego: Julius Mullarkey
- Team affiliations: MI-13

Killpower (Julius Mullarkey) is a fictional character appearing in American comic books published by Marvel Comics. The character appears primarily in British comic books from Marvel UK. He is the partner of Motormouth and first appeared in Motormouth #1 (June 1992). Killpower was created by Gary Frank and Graham Mark.

== Publication history ==
After his initial appearance in Motormouth, Killpower starred in a self-titled limited series. After that, his series and Motormouth's were combined and renamed Motormouth and Killpower, often with Killpower's name appearing handwritten or scrawled below Motormouth's as if an afterthought, possibly as a reference to Motormouth's view of him as being a hanger-on.

He, along with Motormouth, appeared in Paul Cornell's Captain Britain and MI13 in 2009, and then later in the 2014 Revolutionary War miniseries.

== Fictional character biography ==
Killpower is a genetically engineered super-being created by Gena-Sys Labs, a subsidiary of Mys-Tech. He was made by the mad scientist Dr. Oonagh Mullarkey using human and animal DNA and was designed as an expendable super-soldier, maturing at a rapid rate. He was given the name Julius Mullarkey by his creator, and by the age of 18 months reached his adult size of 6 feet 8 inches (2.03 m) and 325 pounds. Killpower has a childlike mentality, but ias not taught any morals and has no understanding of concepts like the value of human life.

Killpower works as an operative of Gena-Sys until he encounters Motormouth, who teaches him that killing is wrong. When Motormouth is shot in the throat, Julius heals her with technology, giving her a sonic scream and integrating her MOPED device into her body. Motormouth and Killpower become traveling partners and adventurers.

Killpower, Death's Head, Dark Angel, Hulk, and other heroes are kidnapped to take part in brutal gladiatorial games. They continue on far longer than they would because powerful pacifist doctors have been enslaved to heal all fighters. Killpower uses his technological skills to help the heroes overthrow the leader of the games and destroy his plans to conquer all reality. Killpower dies in the final battle, but is resurrected by doctors.

When Mys-Tech tries to send all of Britain to Hell, Killpower participates in a battle at London Bridge and enters Hell to save Motormouth. The other heroes are unable to rescue him and Killpower is trapped in Hell, where he is manipulated by Mephisto into believing his friends did not care to rescue him. Years of manipulation turn Killpower into a rage-driven, murderous beast who, at Mephisto's urgings, leads a demonic invasion on Earth. Killpower tries to kill Motormouth in revenge, but her sonic scream clears his mind. Realising he had been made into "a bad man", Killpower allows himself to be killed.

== Other versions ==
In the alternate universe of Days of Future Past, Killpower is one of the few survivors of the anti-Sentinel front, the Resistance Coordination Execution.

== Powers and abilities ==
Killpower has a combination of human and animal DNA as well as "bio-occult conditioning" provided by Mys-Tech. He possesses enhanced strength, speed, stamina, reflexes, senses, and agility. He was shown shrugging off the impact of 20 tons of debris. He also has an instinctive affinity for all sorts of technology, a "mecha-psychometry" that allows him to use, repair, and rebuild devices that he has never seen before.

Killpower received training in various forms of combat and the use of numerous firearms.
