= Warheads (comics) =

Comic book series

Publication information
- Publisher: Marvel UK
- Schedule: Monthly
- Format: Ongoing series
- Genre: , science fiction, superhero
- Publication date: January 1992–May 1993
- No. of issues: 14

Creative team
- Created by: Paul Neary; Gary Erskine
- Written by: Nick Vince; John Freeman; Craig Houston
- Artist(s): Gary Erskine; Simon Coleby; Dave Taylor; Stuart Jennett; Charlie Adlard

Warheads was a Marvel UK comic book series which ran for 14 issues in the early 1990s (January 1992–May 1993) and was followed by the two-issue mini-series Warheads: Black Dawn. The stories contained in the comic were also serialised in the UK comics anthology Overkill. The Warheads were mercenaries employed by the nefarious and Faustian Mys-Tech organisation to capture advanced technology or mystical artifacts from alien worlds, time periods, or other dimensions.

The book had guest appearances, such as the X-Men, Silver Surfer, Mephisto, X-Force, and agents of S.H.I.E.L.D. It features many backup 'flashback' stories.

== Publication history ==
Paul Neary was instrumental in creating the whole Mys-Tech concept for Marvel UK, including the original Warheads outline. The characters in Warheads were first visualised by artist Gary Erskine with the first scripts for the strips provided by Nick Vince, followed by John Freeman and Craig Houston, who is now a computer game scriptwriter whose credits include Call of Duty 3.

Unlike most of the other Marvel UK titles tied into the Mys-Tech concept, the Warheads were not enemies of Mys-Tech—instead, they were portrayed as expendable soldiers employed by a callous corporation. They did, eventually, turn against Mys-Tech, having had enough.

Other Warheads artists included Simon Coleby, Dave Taylor, Stuart Jennett, and Charlie Adlard. Mark Harrison painted an unpublished spin-off, called Loose Cannons, available online, about the all-female Virago Troop (Holly, Elan, Nix (who is killed and replaced with the genetically enhanced Lamia, a creation of Dr. Oonagh Mullarkey), team psychic Syster Sphynx, and team leader Bodecia "Bo" Kildare) and provided Warheads several covers for Overkill.

== Fictional team biography ==
The Warheads find themselves in a seemingly abandoned Australian town. Liger, the leader, realizes he is on the 'downside' of a time loop, where the team has not gone to other dimensions or other planets, but back in time on Earth. A subtle memory indicates three of his team must die and Liger realizes he must allow this to preserve the timeline. The town belongs to the X-Men and three of his team members do indeed die in battle with Wolverine. Liger's first step towards rebellion is taken when his bosses say the loss of three Warheads is worth the information they ultimately stole from the X-Men.

The story then focuses on Leona McBride, a rookie brought in to replace one of the dead members slain by Wolverine. Her first mission involves exploring an alien spaceship. Leona is distressed when it seems one of her newfound friends vanishes and dies but he turns up alive, as Iron Man had been impersonating him. Later, the Warheads fight S.H.I.E.L.D. operatives, X-Force, and the X-Men again and deal with their boss gaining vast, cosmic powers. With X-Force, it ends up being that the women of the team have to save the day, as the men (on both sides) are transforming into powerful beasts. The Warheads women are assisted by Feral, who gains vast powers due to magical influence.

The troops also struggle with the bureaucratic processes of their bosses. For example, Gregory is fined for screaming during a simple nightmare.

Again and again, Liger sees new recruits and troop replacements die and he is angry that they do not seemingly receive enough training. Some die during training, which is that much more frustrating to him.

Gregory is recruited for a side-mission by one of his bosses in an attempt to slay Mephisto. For his effrontery, he is merged with a demon. The team would confront Mephisto again when they travel to his realm to 'rescue' the source of Misha's precognitive voices. This would turn out to be Mephisto's son Blackheart. While Gregory finds the other half of his body and slays the demon, the Troop loses Perez.

=== Rebellion ===
In the Mys-Tech Wars series, the troop is sent to a mystical copy of Earth, which was created by their bosses to gain control of the real Earth. They fight the cyborg Death's Head and encounter a lost little girl. In a bit of magic which saves their lives, the girl is overcome by the stress and dies. This is the last straw for the troop, who rebel with the aid of Death's Head. Ultimately the troop escapes control, having discovered a way to travel through dimensions. Unfortunately, the first trip takes them to a world populated by vampires, where Leona and another member die. Though the troop escapes this world, their ultimate fate is unknown.

=== Revolutionary War ===
The team were key players when Mys-Tech were defeated in the Battle of London Bridge - the organisation had tried to buy off Mephisto by sending all of Britain to Hell, and Liger's rebel Warheads went into the infernal realm to shut down the portal. They were betrayed by Gregory and forced to remain in Hell to succeed, and Kether Troop forced Liger back to Earth. He spent the next few years as a traumatized, homeless alcoholic separated from his gun Clementine.

When Mys-Tech returned, S.H.I.E.L.D.'s European Division head Keller brought Liger back in from the cold and tasked him to dig up intelligence. Keller turned out to be possessed by Mys-Tech's old Psycho-Wraith Prime, and Liger had been brought in just to find Warhead's old Master Key, so the Key could be forced to open a portal for Mephisto's armies; Psycho-Wraith Prime taunted Liger that S.H.I.E.L.D. simply hadn't cared enough to bring him back before or find his lost troops. However, the wounded Liger was able to help free some of Prime's captured superheroes and helped gun down Mephisto's general Killpower, saving the world. Afterward, he disappeared with the now-cured Keller on a trip to Hell to find Kether Troop.

== Warheads Kether Troop ==
=== Colonel Tigon Liger ===
The comic focused on the Kether Troop led by Colonel Tigon Liger, whose most notable feature was prominent facial scarring from being slashed by Wolverine. He carried a very large semi-intelligent gun named Clementine that, while helpful to the troop, sometimes endangered them when Liger's orders were unclear. The creators of Warheads named Colonel Liger after two hybrid animals; a tigon is a crossbreed between a male tiger and a female lion crossbreed, a liger being its reverse.

=== Other members ===
The membership varied over the course of the series, with frequent inclusion of trainee characters, new recruits, or "loaner" members from other Troops, who usually died in the course of action (like redshirts on Star Trek). In rough sequential order, the Kether Troop included:

Issue 1:

- Stacy Arnheim (in charge of troop defence and who was normally depicted wearing a large exoskeleton of combat armour)
- Cale (a retriever and expert at scavenging; Col. Liger's lover, killed in the first story)
- Corey (technician, killed in the first story)
- Draft (described as a hit-man, killed in the first story)
- Gregory (hit-man, replacement for Draft)
- Johnny Heaven (technician, replacement for Corey, killed by Leona in issue #2)
- Leona McBride (retriever, replacement for Cale, turned into a vampire at the end of Warheads: Black Dawn #2)
- Misha (a Psi-Scout, with precognitive abilities)
- Perez (the troop medic, killed in issue #10)

Issue 3:

- Chalmers (new recruit, killed)
- Grierson (technician, on loan from Ubu Troop)
- Peters (new recruit, killed)
- Samuels (new recruit, female retriever, killed)

Issue 6:

- Athena (killed)
- Che (martial artist, sole survivor of Malkuth troop, reassigned to Kether)
- Desmond (killed)

Issue 9:

- Bell (on loan from another troop)
- Jenna (troop defence, on loan from another troop)
- Moxham (technician, on loan from another troop)
- Ross (killed)

Issue 12:

- Connor (trainee, killed)
- Dreyfus
- MacManus (trainee, killed)
- Martinez (new recruit, killed)
- O'Leary (new recruit, killed)
- Sapperstein (new recruit, killed)

Issue 13:

- DeCosta (medic, killed in Warheads: Black Dawn #1)
- Duncan (new recruit, technician)

Other series:

- Desdemona
- Evone
- Prizzi

== Other Warheads troops ==
The following is a list of other Warheads Troops employed by Mys-Tech and mentioned in Warheads, Overkill, or other Marvel titles:

- Bina Troop
  - Leader: Colonel Matt Travers
  - Cover: Archeological Expedition
  - Membership: Diana Rogers (deceased), Matt Travers (deceased)
- Cesad Troop
  - Leader: Colonel Jane Sumner
  - Cover: The Cirque de Chaos
- Gebu Troop
  - Leader: Colonel James Cleveland
  - Cover: Film Crew
- Hesod Troop
  - Leader: Colonel Mary Kidd
  - Cover: Search and Rescue Squad
- Hod Troop
  - Leader: Colonel Henry Morgan
  - Cover: Satellite Recovery
- Kockmar Troop
  - Leader: Colonel James Sands
  - Cover: The Cirque de Chaos
- Malkuth Troop
  - Membership: Boot, Che
- Net Troop
  - Leader: Colonel Arthur Drake
  - Cover: Survey Team
- Tifaret Troop
  - Leader: Colonel Bonnie Reid
  - Cover: Fairground
- Ubu Troop
  - Leader: Colonel Bonnie Reid
  - Cover: Fairground
  - Membership: Grierson
- Omega Troop
- Gevurah Troop
- Virago Troop

The names of the original Warheads troops are a direct reference to the names of the 10 Sephiroth emanations of God in the Kabbalah. This is known to be a direct reference, as the Warheads were originally depicted as entering wormholes on a model of the cabalistic Tree of Life, and they entered the wormhole where the Sephiroth Kether is situated. Significantly, "Kether" is the Sephiroth at the top of the tree of life and "Kether" means "crown". "Kether" also is the Sephiroth closest to God and represents ultimate goodness.

The Kether Troop eventually showed their goodness by turning upon the evil Mys-Tech organisation. Several other troops did not—Omega, Gevurah, and a replenished Malkuth Troop were all specifically named as fighting for Mys-Tech until the end (and taking part in “the genocide on Lionheart”) in the Revolutionary War comics.

Later troops, including Omega, Virago, and Ubu, are not named after a Sephiroth.

== Headquarters ==
The Warheads' base of operations was Mys-Tech's subterranean headquarters deep beneath the Museum of Pagan Antiquities, Canary Wharf, London, England and they traveled to other planets, time periods, locations, or dimensions by means of unstable wormholes opened by Mys-Tech's techno-wizards.
