= Motormouth (comics) =

Marvel comics character

Publication information
- Publisher: Marvel UK
- First appearance: Motormouth 1 (June 1992)
- Created by: Paul Neary; Graham Marks; Gary Frank

In-story information
- Alter ego: Harley Davis
- Species: Human Cyborg
- Team affiliations: MI-13
- Partnerships: Killpower
- Abilities: Sonic scream; Multiversal teleporation (via MOPED technology); Energy identification

Motormouth (Harley Davis) is a fictional character appearing in American comic books published by Marvel Comics. The character was created by Paul Neary and developed by writer Graham Marks, with initial designs by Gary Frank. As the title character of her own series, Motormouth (later Motormouth & Killpower) was part of a line of original comics released in the early-to-mid 1990s by Marvel UK. She is a teenage street rat from London, England, with a fierce temper who curses constantly. She later gains the ability to emit a sonic scream and jump across realities using technology.

== Publication history ==
Motormouth ran for 12 issues, with Harley and later her partner Killpower going to various alternative realities from the regular Marvel Universe.

== Fictional character biography ==
Harley Davis was orphaned at age 11 and grew up as part of a gang in the East End of London. They survive by foraging and stealing. Her incredibly foul language earns her the nickname "Motormouth." When she is 17, Harley is discovered by Laarson, an agent of Mys-Tech. Harley is a candidate for his MOPED (Mind-Operated Personal Dematerialization) technology, which allows people to jump between alternative realities, but it will only operate on people with certain strands of DNA. The unit is disguised as a pair of training shoes, which Harley finds and tries on. At the same time, Laarson is being executed by Mys-Tech's techno-wizards, and agents are sent to find the MOPED units. To save her and the units, Laarson's subordinates activate the technology and send her to another universe.

While on the run from Mys-Tech, Harley is sent to a future in which the world is covered in shopping malls. She purchases a Soni-Muta 500 Unit, a microchip that allows her to mentally tune in to any radio station she wants. Harley returns to her own universe and is captured and put to work by Mys-Tech. She escapes after a mission to Tokyo.

=== Killpower ===
Harley makes a random jump to escape and ends up on the planet Tekron. Killpower, an agent of Mys-Tech, is sent to find her. Unable to escape him, Harley reasons with the man instead. Killpower is intrigued by Harley and joins her as her partner. While on Tekron, Harley is injured when a stray bullet hits her in the throat. Killpower uses her Soni-Muta 500 and MOPED technology to cure her, giving her a sonic scream and the ability to travel between universes without the aid of technology. Both are then forced to flee from Mys-Tech's influence.

Motormouth and Killpower then appear in the Battletide mini-series. Death's Head is hired by Mys-Tech to retrieve Killpower. While the two fight, Motormouth and Tuck (Death's Head's partner) go on a shopping spree on an alien planet. Motormouth and Killpower later plan an attack on Tyburn, a powerful Mys-Tech agent. Harley is able to steal their MOPED unit and neutralize the tracking devices Mys-Tech has implanted in the duo. Tyburn survives the attack.

=== Saving the world ===
Motormouth becomes an essential part of the Mys-Tech Wars mini-series. At first, she is just one of many superheroes attacking the main Mys-Tech complex, hoping to take down the Techno-Wizards, the heads of Mys-Tech.

The wizards fight back successfully, slaughtering most of the heroes. Death-Head kills them in return. Unfortunately, this endangers all of Earth. A fortunate fall from Killpower allows six heroes, Motormouth included, to break free of the melee and patch themselves into the required equipment so they can save the Earth from destruction. The others, such as Doctor Strange and Professor X, bring powerful forces to the mix. Motormouth ends up simply sitting in the sixth chair to fill out the required number of entities.

The Earth is saved and time is reversed, undoing all the deaths that have occurred. Only the last six remember any of which had happened.

=== Time Guardian and the Hulk ===
In the Dark Guard mini-series, Motormouth and Killpower are recruited by the Time Guardian to help stop a war on the planet Eopia caused by Tyburn. Motormouth is instrumental in stopping Mys-Tech agent Collapsar, who had captured Killpower. Her extra-sensory vision allows her to see microfractures in his torso, which in turn allows Death's Head to smash him.

Motormouth and Killpower guest-star in an issue of Incredible Hulk, illustrated by Motormouth co-creator Gary Frank. Killpower and the Hulk briefly fight, though Hulk proves himself more than a match for Motormouth's obscene language. The trio team up to rescue Prince Charles from Madman, who had taken him up Big Ben. Though he is dropped to the side, Charles escapes injury. In the ensuing battle, Harley accidentally brings down London Bridge, and Madman escapes.

=== Post-series appearances ===
Two new stories were planned before the end of Marvel UK. Motormouth versus Removal Man was partially drawn and had her fighting a Mys-Tech assassin who made his targets never exist in the first place (boasting one of his finest jobs as the Fantastic Five). Motormouth Remix would have had her hopping through alternate realities looking for Killpower and running into versions of Marvel US characters to connect Marvel UK more to their parent company.

Sometime later, she becomes a reserve agent for MI:13. When Mys-Tech tries to send all of Britain into Hell, Motormouth and Killpower participate in a battle at London Bridge. Motormouth is also sucked into Hell, but Killpower saves her and the other heroes, leaving himself trapped in the inferno. Harley is left depressed and quits MI:13, living instead on a council estate in London. She became the single mother to two children, Victoria and Albert (named after pubs), and is occasionally targeted by Mys-Tech monsters. After one attack, she learned her children were psychic mutants who were removing her memories of the monsters to stop her from being sad.

Motormouth temporarily rejoins MI:13 and leads an army of British heroes to fight an invasion from Hell. To Harley's shock, Hell's leader is a transformed Killpower, who had been manipulated by Mephisto into believing she abandoned him. Killpower tries to kill Motormouth, but her sonic scream manages to clear his mind. Realizing he had been made into "a bad man", Killpower allows Britain's super-soldiers to kill him. A distraught Harley is approached by Nick Fury to join S.H.I.E.L.D., but refuses.

== Other versions ==
A future version of Harley appears in Excalibur #67 (July 1993). Working with other heroes to protect an enclave of innocent people, she steps up to battle a wave of Sentinels, only to be killed by them. A version appears as the neighbour of an alternate reality Peggy Carter, and another appears in X-Men '92.

== Powers and abilities ==
Harley can create deafening sounds and force blasts by screaming or shouting. By humming at a high pitch, she can use ultrasound to see through solid objects. She can also jump between alternate universes using the MOPED technology built into her. This technology also allows her to sense threats outside her normal field or range of senses. She also seems to have some ability to sense various forms of energy.
