= Marvel UK =

Defunct imprint of Marvel Comics

- Company logotype
- Type: Private
- Industry: Publishing
- Genre: Science fiction, action, superhero
- Founded: 1972; 54 years ago
- Defunct: 1995; 31 years ago
- Key people: Neil Tennant, Dez Skinn, John Freeman, Paul Neary
- Products: Comics
- Parent: Marvel Comics; Panini Comics

Marvel UK was an imprint of Marvel Comics formed in 1972 to reprint US-produced stories for the British weekly comic market. Marvel UK later produced original material by British creators such as Alan Moore, John Wagner, Dave Gibbons, Steve Dillon, and Grant Morrison.

There were a number of editors in charge of overseeing the UK editions. Although based in the United States, Jenny Blake Isabella oversaw the establishment of Marvel UK. She was succeeded by UK-based editors Peter L. Skingley (a.k.a. Peter Allan) and then Matt Softly – both of whom were women who adopted male pen names for the job (in reality, they were Petra Skingley and Maureen Softly). They were then replaced by Neil Tennant, who later found fame with the pop group the Pet Shop Boys. Nick Laing succeeded him, but with a turbulent market and falling sales, Laing was let go and Dez Skinn took over. Paul Neary was editor in chief in 1995, when Marvel UK was shut down.

Panini Comics obtained the license to print Marvel material in 1995 and took over the UK office's remaining titles.

== Publishing history ==
=== Predecessors ===
After World War II, the UK was intent on promoting homegrown publishers, and thus banned the direct importation of American periodicals, including comic books; that ban was lifted in 1959. The British company Thorpe & Porter became the sole UK distributor of both DC and Marvel comics. Thus it was that in the early 1960s brand-new American-printed copies of Fantastic Four #1, Amazing Fantasy #15, and countless others appeared in the UK. Alan Class Comics also reprinted select Marvel superhero stories during this period. Thorpe & Porter, however, went bankrupt in 1966 and was purchased by Independent News Distributors (IND), the distribution arm of National Periodical Publications (DC Comics). As a result, T & P's output became almost exclusively reprints of DC titles.

At that point, in early 1966, Odhams Press (a division of IPC Magazines) acquired the Marvel license, and reprints of American Marvel superhero material — including the Hulk, the Fantastic Four, Spider-Man, Thor, and the X-Men — began to be published in the UK in Odhams' Power Comics line of titles. Titles such as Wham!, Smash!, and Pow! featured a mix of Marvel reprints and original UK comics; while the titles Fantastic and Terrific were dominated by Marvel superhero stories. This arrangement lasted till March 1969, when the last Marvel strip was removed from Smash!.

Beginning about a year and a half later, from late November 1970 to late September 1971, reprints of Spider-Man and the Silver Surfer appeared in TV21, published by City Magazines (a company closely associated with IPC). From that point, no Marvel titles were being regularly reprinted in the UK (although IPC released a Marvel Annual, featuring Marvel superhero reprints, in autumn 1972).

=== Origins: MWOM and Spider-Man Comics Weekly ===
In 1972, seeing a gap in the popular weekly comics market of the UK, Marvel Comics formed their own British publishing arm, Marvel UK (under the corporate name of Magazine Management London Ltd.). Though publishing comics in the UK for a British audience, Marvel UK was under the editorial direction of Marvel's New York offices, overseen by the then 21-year-old American writer/editor Jenny Blake Isabella. Pippa Melling (née King), a British former staffer at Odhams who was familiar with the adjustments needed to transform stories from the monthly American comics to the weekly British ones, was employed on a six-month contract to help set the whole thing up.

Marvel UK started with The Mighty World of Marvel, which featured mainly black-and-white art with spot colouring (except for the front and back pages which were in full colour). Originally the weekly comic was created by slicing up storylines from the monthly American versions of The Incredible Hulk, The Amazing Spider-Man, and the Fantastic Four.

A few months later Spider-Man Comics Weekly was released. Again this carried on reprinted American Spider-Man material originally started in MWOM, with the adventures of Thor starting as a back-up feature. The new title allowed an entire issue of the US The Amazing Spider-Man to be reprinted every week in the UK publication. Both of these initial series were huge successes and became the mainstays of the Marvel UK lineup; The Mighty World Of Marvel, in one form or another, was published continuously until 1984, while the Spider-Man weekly comic (under many different name changes) would continue until 1985.

=== Expansion: Skingley and Softly era ===
In 1973, the US-based editor Isabella was replaced by the UK-based Petra Skingley (credited in the comics as "Peter L. Skingley" and "Peter Allan.") That year, Marvel UK launched The Avengers — starting with material from issue #4 of the US series which reintroduced Captain America (issues #1-3 had been reprinted in The Mighty World of Marvel). The new title introduced glossy covers around a smaller 36-page comic, down from the previous 40-page format of MWOM and Spider-Man Comics Weekly. Doctor Strange was the back-up feature. Glossy covers were to be a distinctive feature of Marvel UK weeklies until the "Marvel Revolution" in 1979. The other two titles also changed to this new format. In Spider-Man the decrease to 36 pages marked the reduction of Spider-Man material so that now only half a US issue was reproduced in the UK weekly, and Iron Man was added to the lineup. (MWOM and SMCW had started at 40 pages but dropped to 32 before the launch of The Avengers.)

In 1974, two new weeklies were added that departed from the usual superhero fare. These were Dracula Lives! and Planet of the Apes, the latter reprinting material from the American black & white Marvel Monster Group brand. In 1976 Dracula Lives! was canceled and merged with Planet of the Apes as of issue #88. The Apes adventures lasted until 1977, the final months as a co-feature with the Hulk, in MWOM from issue #231. The non-superhero launches continued in March 1975 as Savage Sword of Conan was added as a weekly title.

Concurrently with Savage Sword of Conan, Marvel UK launched a new weekly title called The Super-Heroes. Although it originally starred popular characters like the Silver Surfer and the X-Men, The Super-Heroes eventually began reprinting stories starring such obscure characters as Doc Savage, Ant-Man, The Cat, Scarecrow, and Bloodstone. Maureen Softly (using her son's name Matt in the credits). replaced Skingley as editor in late 1975.

Marvel UK's fifth superhero title, also debuting in 1975 (October), was The Titans, which was notable for its use of a "landscape" orientation. Although this format allowed two pages of Marvel U.S. artwork to fit onto one (magazine-sized) Marvel UK page, reader reaction was mixed, as it made the text small and often difficult to read. The Titans featured well-known characters like Captain America, Captain Marvel, the Sub-Mariner, the Inhumans, and Nick Fury. With issue 27 the Fantastic Four were moved over from The Mighty World of Marvel to headline the title.

The Super-Heroes lasted fifty issues before being canceled in early 1976, at which point it was merged into Spider-Man Comics Weekly, which changed its title to Super Spider-Man with the Super-Heroes. At this point, the book also changed orientation to become a landscape-format comic like The Titans. Just six issues before the end of The Titans' run, with issue 58 in November 1976, the Avengers had moved over from The Mighty World of Marvel to be its lead strip so that the Fantastic Four could join the line up of a new comic called Captain Britain. As with The Super-Heroes, on The Titans' cancellation it was merged with Spider-Man weekly, becoming Super Spider-Man and the Titans.

=== Tennant and Laing era ===
Marvel UK began to establish itself as a major publisher of weekly comic titles (along with D.C Thomson and IPC) under the direction of editor-in-chief Neil Tennant (later one of the Pet Shop Boys). Tennant was responsible for anglicising the dialogue of the comics to suit British readers, and for indicating where women needed to be redrawn "more decently" for the British editions.

However, with the exception of some new covers drawn by Marvel Comics' American staff, no original material had yet been produced by Marvel UK. This changed in 1976 when Captain Britain Weekly was launched, featuring a hero created for the British market. Captain Britain Weekly featured new stories in colour as well as reprints of Nick Fury and Fantastic Four strips as backup. It was initially a success but eventually combined with Marvel UK's Spider-Man reprint title from #39.

It was Neil Tennant's suggestion to create an original British Marvel war comic to compete with titles such as Warlord and Battle Picture Weekly. While no original material was commissioned the concept of a war comic found fruition as Fury which ran from March to August 1977 before merging with MWOM. It reprinted Sgt. Fury and his Howling Commandos and Captain Savage and his Leatherneck Raiders.

Tennant left in 1977 and was replaced by Nick Laing. In early 1978, Laing oversaw the launch of Marvel UK's Star Wars Weekly title, soon after the film was released in the UK. The weekly issues split the stories from the US monthly issues into smaller installments, and it usually took three weekly issues to complete a US monthly issue. In May 1980 the title became known as The Empire Strikes Back Weekly, and in November 1980 it transformed into a monthly publication. Marvel UK's Star Wars comic also published original Star Wars stories by British creators as well as reprinting the US comics material. Many, but not all, of these original British stories were reprinted in the 1990s by Dark Horse Comics. The format changed back to a weekly in June 1983 with the adaptation of Return of the Jedi (which also became the new name of the publication), and remained so until its last issue in 1986. Prior to the Return of the Jedi comic, the strips in the UK Star Wars comics were printed in black and white, even those taken from the American color versions. The UK comics also reprinted several other supporting strips in each issue from other Marvel properties (such as The Micronauts, Tales of the Watcher, Star-Lord, etc.). While the comic was in a weekly format, the supporting strips often made up the bulk of each issue.

=== Skinn era ("The Marvel Revolution") ===
By the late 1970s, sales of Marvel UK titles had begun to fall and it was on a visit to the UK that Stan Lee headhunted Dez Skinn to revamp the ailing company. Knowing Skinn had significant experience in British comic publishing, Lee gave him the freedom to do what he felt best. Skinn had his own catchphrase in "Dez Sez," which was inspired by Lee's catchphrases from the 1960s. Skinn set out to change Marvel UK as he saw fit, dubbing the changes "The Marvel Revolution". Taking over in late 1978, the first major change he brought was to have original material produced by British creators. Many of these creators had already worked with Skinn on his title The House of Hammer a few years earlier, plus some new young talent.

Skinn wrote: "[T]raditional British comics were at the time selling 150,000+ a week, firm sale, no returns. If Marvel and Spider-Man could look British enough for some of that to rub off, everybody would be happy ... But fixing the covers to resemble the non-glossy generic look of weekly anthology titles was one thing ... Having "splash" pages and then five or six frames a page just didn't stack up against Warlord, Action, Battle, and the rest with their nine to 12 a page." So the US artwork was re-sized to fit several pages onto one and emulate the look of the more established UK boys' weeklies.

Skinn reasoned that Marvel superhero weeklies had been effectively competing with each other in an already crowded market. So while the Spider-Man Comic was to be the flagship superhero comic (with Thor, Iron Man, Avengers, Fantastic Four, and Nova), The Mighty World of Marvel was re-launched as Marvel Comic, in the tradition of UK boys' adventure titles. Dracula, Conan the Barbarian, and Skull the Slayer joined (or re-joined) established strips Daredevil and Hulk (although the Hulk was replaced three issues after the re-launch by Godzilla, as the Hulk left for his own title).

The Hulk was a popular character – Rampage Weekly which starred The Defenders had been added to Marvel's list of publications under Tennant's editorship as a second vehicle for the green giant – and now with his own TV series Skinn saw the Hulk as the lead feature of another adventure style comic. Hulk Comic started out with originally produced Hulk stories by Steve Dillon, Paul Neary, and John Stokes, among others, which reflected the green-skinned behemoth as depicted on the TV. Skinn explained: "As with Marvel Comic, I was wanting an adventure anthology title more than a superhero one. Super-heroes had never been big sellers in the UK, we had plenty of legends of the past to spin fantasies about. So I went that route, picking existing Marvel characters who weren't really cut from the super-hero cloth." Originally produced stories were included, such as Nick Fury drawn by Steve Dillon, and Night Raven by Steve Parkhouse and David Lloyd. Also included was the Black Knight, a Marvel character revamped to take in Arthurian concepts, as well as feature the return of Captain Britain from comic book limbo. As well there was the usual US reprint material, such as Ant-Man and in later issues the Beast from Amazing Adventures, and even The Defenders were moved in from Rampage Monthly to increase the dose of Hulk action (a house ad showed a stern doctor holding out a handful of pills and saying, "Boredom is a sickness... and there's only one cure. More Hulk action!!!").

Arguably Skinn's most important decision was to launch Doctor Who Weekly in 1979. Based on the BBC TV series (which at that point had already been running for 16 years), Doctor Who Weekly featured original comics stories by John Wagner, Pat Mills, and Dave Gibbons, among many others, plus articles and features on the show itself. It proved a huge success, and by now Skinn had transformed Marvel UK back to being a major publisher of not just weekly comics but monthly titles such as Starburst. Starburst had been created by Skinn before he joined Marvel UK, but was purchased by Marvel when he joined the company.

Skinn left Marvel UK in 1980 (eventually forming Quality Communications in 1982).

==== Pocket Books ====
In March 1980, as part of the "Marvel Revolution," Skinn launched the Marvel Pocket Books line with four 52-page titles. The line began with Spider-Man, the Fantastic Four, Star Heroes (featuring TV tie-in Battlestar Galactica and the toy-based strip the Micronauts continued from their previous run in Star Wars Weekly), and Chiller (starring Dracula and the Man-Thing with occasional appearance from other horror-related characters). Following Skinn's belief that much of Marvel's strongest material was that published in the 1960s and early 70s, many of these titles showcased strips from that period.

Skinn drew on the design of the traditional UK Picture Library titles (such as Thriller Picture Library and War Picture Library), which boomed in the 1960s, to establish a definitive look for the Pocket Books. Skinn wrote that they "emulated the look in their Combat Picture Library covers ... that was the look I wanted, to pull the line of pocket books together visually and make them different to any of our other titles ..."

The first four titles were later joined by Hulk, The Titans (reprinting the 1960s stories of Captain America, Thor and Iron Man), Marvel Classics Comics (featuring comic book adaptations of classic literature), Conan, and Young Romance. Some titles were not a success in terms of sales: Hulk, Conan, The Titans, Marvel Classics Comics, and Young Romance were cancelled after 13 issues, while Star Heroes (which had replaced The Micronauts with the original X-Men from issue #10) was re-launched as X-Men Pocket Book from #14. All other Pocket Books were cancelled after issue 28 in July/August 1982.

The Hulk strips continued in a newly launched The Incredible Hulk Weekly and similarly the classic Fantastic Four strips resurfaced in a weekly title in October 1982. Both of these eventually folded into Spider-Man, where the strips continued on and off until it changed into The Spider-Man Comic, aimed at younger readers. The classic Spider-Man material continued in the first few issues of The Daredevils.

=== 1980s ===
In September 1981, Captain Britain got his own strip in the pages of Marvel Superheroes (the by-then firmly established monthly version of The Mighty World Of Marvel/Marvel Comic), as written by Dave Thorpe and drawn by Alan Davis. (Thorpe left in 1982, to be replaced by Alan Moore in one of Moore's first major ongoing strips.) In October 1981, inspired by the success of its Doctor Who title, Marvel UK began publishing a monthly Blake's 7 title, initially edited by Stewart Wales. However, as the television series itself went off the air in late 1981, the magazine itself lasted less than two years.

Despite a flurry of new weeklies post-Skinn (Forces in Combat, Marvel Team-Up, Future Tense and Valour), by 1983 Marvel UK moved mainly to monthly titles such as The Daredevils (featuring Moore and Davis's Captain Britain). Many of Marvel UK's titles wouldn't last long, however, before being combined or cancelled outright due to poor sales.

In January 1985, the first issue of Captain Britain Monthly appeared with its titular strip written by Jamie Delano and drawn by Alan Davis. This title lasted 14 issues before cancellation and would prove to be Marvel UK's last major new title for several years. New material was still being produced, such as the Zoids stories (written by Grant Morrison) for Secret Wars and Spider-Man and Zoids, but not on the scale or diversity previously seen.

For the remainder of the 1980s the company published only a small handful of titles that appealed to superhero fans, but had considerable success on the UK newsstands with licensed titles such as Care Bears, Lady Lovely Locks, The Real Ghostbusters, ThunderCats, Transformers, and many others. These all featured original strips as well as some US reprints.

Transformers, in particular, was a major seller for Marvel UK, selling 200,000 copies a week at its height. Its main writer, Simon Furman, would eventually take over the Marvel US version of the title as well, and continues to work on the franchise to this day, though it is no longer published by either branch of Marvel Comics. The Marvel UK Transformers series, running 332 issues, is, besides Bob Budiansky's run on the American comic, regarded as the most important collection of Transformers fiction. As such, Transformers remains one of Marvel UK's most important historical titles. (The Marvel UK Transformers series was reprinted by Titan Books in the 2000s with some omissions, notably all of the UK exclusive stories prior to issue 45. Although these have now been reprinted by IDW Publishing along with the rest of the weekly and Annual stories as part of The Transformers Classics UK collections.)

From 1988, it was The Real Ghostbusters that became the top seller; it ran for 193 issues, four annuals, and a Slimer spinoff, and its characters were used to anchor several other titles like Wicked! and The Marvel Bumper Comic.

In 1988, Marvel UK letterer/designer Richard Starkings pushed for the company to publish its own US-format comics, beginning with Dragon's Claws and Death's Head (a spin-off character from Marvel UK's Transformers title). The Sleeze Brothers (1989–1990) was a creator-owned title by John Carnell and Andy Lanning. It was Steve White who launched the first critically acclaimed volume of Knights of Pendragon (1990–1991), written by Dan Abnett and John Tomlinson with art by Gary Erskine, which mixed superheroes and Arthurian myth. It also featured Captain Britain among many other Marvel Comics heroes, such as Iron Man.

Strip was a short-lived comics anthology published by Marvel UK in 1990. It ran for 20 issues (February - November 1990) and featured work by many British comics creators, including Alan Grant, Ian Gibson, Pat Mills, Kevin O'Neill, Si Spencer and John Wagner. Strips include Marshal Law by Pat Mills and Kev O'Neill and Grimtoad by Grant, Wagner and Gibson.

By 1990, Marvel had told its UK branch that long miniseries were too expensive and that it should produce four-issue minis (John Freeman recalled "some legal or distribution restriction in the US on publishing three-part miniseries, which the company would have preferred") that would try out new characters. Freeman and Dan Abnett first wanted to revive Death's Head, give a miniseries to Strip character Rourke of the Radlands, and spin-off Doctor Who Magazine's Abslom Daak as an original character. This last one was dropped as Marvel felt Doctor Who was "a 'dead' franchise and there was no value to Marvel in seeking to extend a brand they did not themselves own."

=== Neary era ===
Paul Neary became Marvel UK editor-in-chief circa 1990, appointed to revamp the company and make another attempt at the US market. As a stop-gap, he had two short-lived reprint titles created: Havoc and Meltdown (which reprinted Akira).

The US-format titles began with Death's Head II, a recreation of Simon Furman's cyborg bounty hunter. The titles were set in the existing Marvel Universe but with more of a focus on cyberpunky science fiction and magic than the traditional superhero fare. Titles such as Warheads (wormhole-hopping mercenaries), Motormouth (later Motormouth and Killpower, a streetwise girl and escaped genetically modified super-assassin hop around the universe having adventures) and a second volume of Knights of Pendragon. These were all linked by plots featuring the organization Mys-Tech, a shadowy group of Faustians bent on world domination. Some of these titles were also reprinted in the UK anthology Overkill.

At some point during Neary's run but before the market crash, Marvel UK was running low on money. They requested an emergency meeting with Marvel Entertainment executives Bill Bevin and Terry Stewart to approve a £1m last-ditch strategy. While they got the money, writer Sean Howe would later be told that Bevin was livid about being called to London for a mere one million, asking "why are you wasting my time?"

Neary instituted a deliberate policy to feature Marvel US guest-stars in the Marvel UK stories. However, they would only be featured on eleven pages, and these pages were designed to be able to cut from the main story; the eleven pages without the guest-star were run in Overkill. This policy was dropped after market research showed people expected to see superheroes in Marvel ("that included watching a group of teenagers rip Overkill apart from behind a two-way mirror", according to Freeman). Where US Marvel characters were featured, all the storylines were approved by the American editor in charge of that book. Some were more responsive than others to the outlines, with editors such as Bobbie Chase offering useful feedback for Marvel UK's editors. Very few Marvel US comics referenced any of the original characters or major events that occurred within the Marvel UK comics, with an exception being The Incredible Hulk in August 1993.

Nevertheless, in the US, these comics were initially immensely successful, with some issues being reprinted to keep up with demand. Marvel UK massively expanded, and trading cards were made of their characters. During this flush period, Tom DeFalco requested they make a new hero called Red Squirrel Man. An entire sub-imprint called Frontier Comics was created in 1993, patterning itself after DC's Vertigo Comics and Marvel UK even showed up at the Lord Mayor's Show in 1993, with staff members dressed as superheroes and Death's Head II.

Despite a lineup that included Liam Sharp, Simon Coleby, Bryan Hitch, Carlos Pacheco, Graham Marks, Salvador Larroca, Dan Abnett, and many others, too many titles were launched too quickly in a market which was already swamped by the early 1990s comics boom. In late 1993, Marvel UK would be devastated by the comics market glut and subsequent crash; on 29 September, their new Director of Sales, Lou Bank, reported that they were being hurt by "inadequate display of product" at retail "[that] has hindered sale through" and that it was failed there was "simply no room to display" all the comics being made.

Dark Guard, Cyberspace 3000, Wild Thing, Black Axe, Super Soldiers, and the entire Frontier imprint were cancelled. A large number of projects in the works, from those just proposed to some that had been solicited, were also canceled. The Red Mist 20:20 crossover was killed so late that Roid Rage #1, a Super Soldiers spinoff, was canceled while at the printers. Mark Harrison's Loose Cannons was canceled shortly before it was meant to run (January 1994), despite being almost complete; was later put online by Harrison. Paul Neary told Comic World that this was a "trimming of fat" to allow Marvel UK to focus its marketing efforts on "our strongest characters" and claimed the canceled projects would see the light of day in 1994. Two titles that did still run were spinoffs of Death's Head II in November, with house ads brashly comparing them to other popular comics as part of a marketing strategy to portray the new Marvel UK as a lean, hungry company that could hold its own against the larger (and implicitly duller) competition.

In 1994, Marvel UK had ceased publishing in the US market and was now only printing a handful of titles — mostly reprints — for the UK market, as well as licensed titles like the long-running Doctor Who Magazine. Death's Head II was canceled at #16, of which distributor Capital only sold 7,400 copies. Various creators began looking elsewhere for work and Lou Banks left for Dark Horse Comics. Neary planned a four-title relaunch of their US format line, including Nocturne (an updated Night Raven), The Golden Grenadier, and new titles for Captain Britain and Death's Head. (David Leach's proposal for Death's Head started as a Third Doctor joke, "that we should completely overhaul him, reduce his power, lose the time travel aspect and set it in present-day England".) The Golden Grenadier would have been a 1950s superhero, a grenadier guardsman who worked for a secret organisation run by the Queen Mother. The launch never took place.

Eventually, Nocturne and ClanDestine saw print in America, while Wild Angels (a Dark Angel/Wild Thing team-up) was published in Italy in black-and-white format. Loose Cannons, a canceled Warheads spin-off about the all-female Virago Troop, and painted by Mark Harrison, was released online in 2005 by its own creator.

=== Panini takeover ===
With the failure of its US titles the company was folded into Marvel's Panini Comics business, who at the time was part of Marvel Europe, and had already been reprinting American material across Europe for several years. Casualties of the merger included editor-in-chief Paul Neary and managing director Vincent Conran.

Thanks to this licensing deal, reprints of American Marvel Comics material continued to be published in the UK by Panini from the mid-1990s. They continued printing two existing Marvel UK titles Astonishing Spider-Man and Essential X-Men and followed the continuity of the US comics, however it was approximately two–three years behind the current run in America. Each book contained approximately two or three Marvel US strips in one issue with possibly a "classic" comic printed as a substitute for a comic in the current run, whilst being priced at a reasonable level. In addition to this Panini continued Doctor Who Magazine.

In addition to reprinting the mainstream US comics, Panini started publishing a monthly (later every three weeks) oversized comic, entitled The Spectacular Spider-Man, for younger readers to accompany Spider-Man: The Animated Series, which began broadcasting in the UK in the mid-1990s. Initially, the stories were simply reprints of the US comics based on the series, but eventually the title moved to all-new UK-originated stories, marking the first Marvel UK material featuring classic Marvel characters to be produced since early 1994.

Eventually, the Marvel UK logo itself was dropped. One of the final comics to have it was a licensed Rugrats comic in May 1996. Doctor Who Magazine continued to carry the Marvel UK logo and indicia up to the December 1999 issue (#285), after which it was changed to only Panini UK.
