= Death's Head (Marvel Comics) =

Marvel Comics character

- Death's Head in The Transformers #113

Publication information
- Publisher: Marvel Comics
- First appearance: The Transformers #113 (1987)
- Created by: Simon Furman; Geoff Senior

In-story information
- Team affiliations: Autobots; Time Variance Authority; Imperial Guardians

Death's Head is a fictional character appearing in British and American comic books published by Marvel Comics. He is a time-travelling robotic alien bounty hunter known for his idiosyncratic speech pattern and his greed. Created by Simon Furman and Geoff Senior, the character initially debuted in the Marvel UK publication of The Transformers. The original incarnation of Death's Head has had notable appearances in the Transformers series, Doctor Who Magazine comics, and the Marvel Universe, as both a hero and a villain.

The character has seen iterations from multiple writers. In the 1990s, he was rewritten as a new cyborg character called Death's Head II, and a version called Death's Head 3.0 debuted in the 2000s.

== Publication history ==
=== 1980s ===
Death's Head was initially created as a one-off character to serve as a bounty hunter in The Transformers storyline "Wanted: Galvatron – Dead or Alive" published by Marvel UK in issue #113 from May 1987. According to writer Simon Furman, to prevent the rights to the character being owned by Hasbro (the owners of the Transformers franchise) rather than Marvel, he enlisted Bryan Hitch to create a one-page Western story for Death's Head titled "High Noon, Tex" that was intended to be published prior to his first appearance in the Transformers comic. However, "High Noon, Tex" was first published in 1988, one year after the character's first appearance in The Transformers. The exact nature of why Marvel continues to hold the rights to Death's Head is unclear.

After appearing in The Transformers, he appeared in Marvel UK's Doctor Who Magazine #135 as an opponent of the Seventh Doctor. After his Doctor Who appearance, he was reused again in Dragon's Claws (a British science fiction comic), his own comic series, a graphic novel titled Death's Head: The Body in Question, and other Marvel Universe comic series.

In November and December 1988, Marvel UK held a Death's Head promotional tour, with Furman and Senior going to comic shops in the United Kingdom and signing copies of the first issue of the Death's Head solo comic. The tour was very successful, with over 100 people attending each signing. Every comic shop on the tour had to order extra copies of the comic for the event. Death's Head's solo series was cut short owing to distribution and formatting issues due to differences between American and British comic formats at the time.

According to Simon Furman, Death's Head was envisioned as "pure and concentrated commercialism", and "a child of Thatcher's Britain", in reference to Margaret Thatcher's conservative economic policies. While he was initially designed as a one-off character, Furman stated that the design by Geoff Senior had captured "an elusive 'wow' factor", and that he would eventually serve a more important story role. His initial role was inspired by Spaghetti Western films directed by Sergio Leone. After seeing Senior's design for Death's Head, Furman rewrote the comic to give him a more humorous personality, mannerisms, and a tendency to end sentences as tag questions with the interjection "yes?".

=== 1990s ===
In the 1990s, Death's Head was redesigned as the cybernetic Death's Head II, who killed his previous self.

In the early 1990s, Marvel UK editor-in-chief Paul Neary commissioned Furman and Senior to work on a new comic series involving Death's Head. The series would have been about Death's Head facing the death penalty and what he did to get to that position, and it would have featured the Fantastic Four. In 1992, Liam Sharp approached Neary with a new design for Death's Head inspired by the designs of the Terminator and Predator. Neary loved the design and removed Furman and Senior from the comic, cutting short their work. The new iteration of the character was named Death's Head II. Neary hired Dan Abnett to write the new comic, Sharp for illustrations, and Andy Lanning for inking. Death's Head II starred in his own comic miniseries, in which he killed the original incarnation of Death's Head.

The first issue of the four-part Death's Head II miniseries was highly successful, selling almost 500,000 copies. The rest of the miniseries sold approximately 200,000 copies per issue, prompting Marvel UK to expand it into a full series. It was the highest-ever selling Marvel UK comic miniseries. A costume of Death's Head II was produced and appeared at the Marvel stand at the 1992 San Diego Comic-Con. The extended Death's Head II comic series featured crossover appearances of the Avengers and X-Men. It ended in 1994.

In 1993, Furman wrote issue #54 of Marvel's What If. In this comic, the original version of Death's Head returns and kills Death's Head II.

=== 21st century ===
In 2005, Marvel put out a fan poll for a character to be included in the anthology comic book Amazing Fantasy, and Death's Head won the vote. Furman returned and wrote the new version of the character, dubbed Death's Head 3.0, who is an assassin robot that gains a conscience over the course of the story. Furman originally planned for Death's Head 3.0 to slowly develop into the original version of Death's Head, with the Amazing Fantasy comic serving as his origin story, but Marvel rejected this idea.

After this, Death's Head saw minimal use in 2000s comics, having brief cameos in Captain Britain and MI13 and S.W.O.R.D. comics. In 2007, Sharp and Hitch collaborated to pitch a series called Ultimate Death's Head to Marvel, but it was rejected. A 2008 comic by Dan Abnett and Andy Lanning retroactively established an in-universe connection between Death's Head II and Death's Head 3.0.

In the 2010s, the character saw a revival because of writers that grew up reading the original comics as children. The original version of Death's Head and Death's Head II both appeared in the Revolutionary War comic story line. Writer Kieron Gillen, a fan of the original 1980s version of the character, used him for a key role in his Iron Man comics, and Christopher Yost used him in Avenging Spider-Man #17 as an opponent of Spider-Man. In 2012, Death's Head won a fan vote for inclusion in the tabletop game HeroClix, and he was added to the game in 2013.

A new Death's Head limited series written by Tini Howard and illustrated by Kei Zama was released in 2019. In this series, Death's Head crosses over with the Young Avengers and clashes with an upgraded version of his younger self. Tini Howard stated that the series is about a "fear of obsolescence". Another alternate version of the character, named Death's Head 22, appears in Marvel's Ultimate Universe in the 2026 series Ultimate Endgame. In issue #5 the 2026 series Imperial Guardians, Death's Head appears as the leader of a team called the Imperial Guardians comprising Quasar, Knightwatch, Century, and U.S. Agent.

== Fictional character biography ==
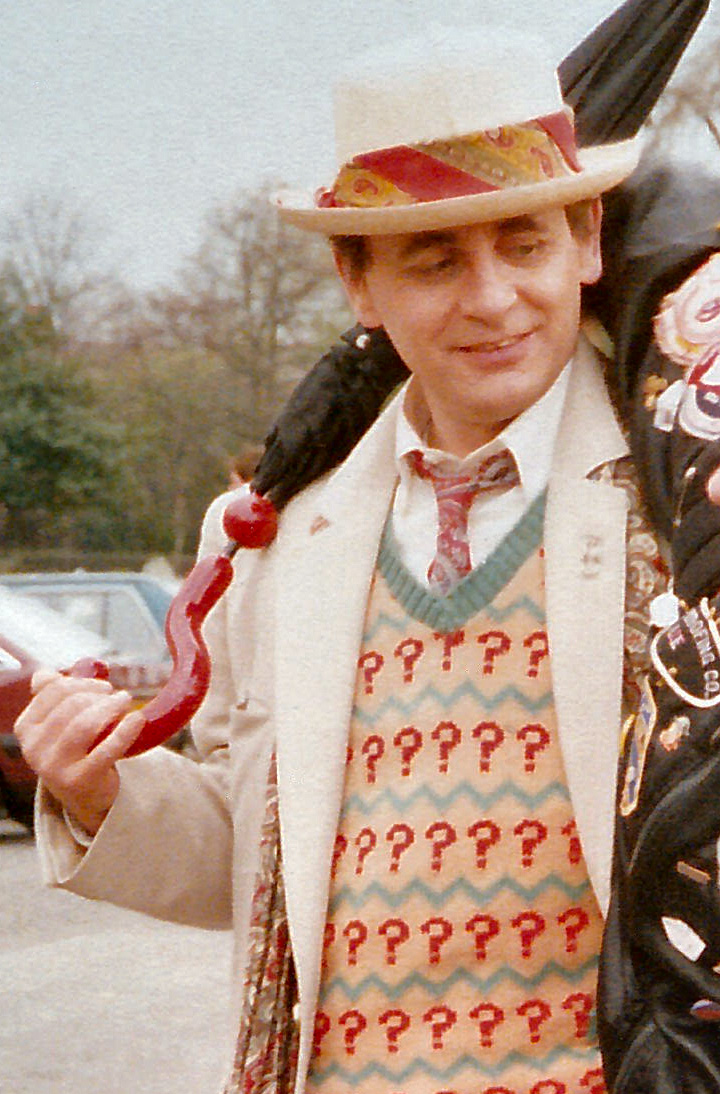
After leaving the Transformers universe, Death's Head becomes an opponent of the Seventh Doctor (pictured) from the Doctor Who universe.

Death's Head is a time-traveling and universe-hopping robotic bounty hunter, although he rejects that label and insists on being called a "freelance peacekeeping agent". Owing to his tendency to travel through time and across universes, Kieron Gillen stated that Death's Head is "probably a walking paradox several times over", but that "he really doesn't seem to care". Furman characterized Death's Head as someone that can "never change or compromise or grow or repent".

In his first appearance in The Transformers, Death's Head is hired by Rodimus Prime, the leader of the Autobots, to hunt down Galvatron, the leader of the Decepticons. Death's Head hunts down Galvatron's lieutenants, Scourge and Cyclonus, traveling back in time to chase them down. Rodimus Prime ultimately captures Galvatron himself, depriving Death's Head of his payment for the job. In response, Death's Head tries to kill Rodimus Prime, but Rodimus pays him off and ends the conflict.

After facing off against the planet-devouring Unicron, he falls through spacetime into the Doctor Who universe in the year 8162 and fights the Seventh Doctor, who shrinks him down to the size of a human and drops him off on the Earth of the Dragon's Claws series in the Marvel Universe. Later, Death's Head is hired by the villain Josiah W. Dogbolter to hunt down and kill the Doctor. Dogbolter equips Death's Head with a time machine to find his target, although the Doctor realizes that the time machine is also a thermo-nuclear bomb, as Dogbolter secretly plans to kill Death's Head as well. The Doctor and Death's Head work together and succeeded in removing the bomb and destroying Dogbolter's lair, after which point the Doctor dumps Death's Head on top of the Baxter Building, the headquarters of the Fantastic Four. Mister Fantastic tries to send Death's Head back to 8162, but accidentally sends him to the year 2020, and Death's Head battles against Iron Man 2020.

After various adventures in the Marvel Universe, including working for the Time Variance Authority, Death's Head is killed in the year 2020 by Minion, a cyborg created by Advanced Idea Mechanics. Minion has the power to absorb the personalities of those that it kills, and it absorbs Death's Head. However, Death's Head's personality takes over Minion's body, becoming Death's Head II. Death's Head II pursues a villain named Charnel to Earth-616 where he teams up with the Avengers from an alternate future. Charnel kills the Avengers, but Death's Head II manages to kill him by sending him simultaneously to the past and future, ripping him in half. He is also transported back in time again by the Doctor to help his past self battle against the robot villain Hob. Death's Head II has multiple potential futures: Phaedra, a character with precognition, foresees that he will rule a galaxy and bring about a millennium of peace, and that he will become the godlike being Psyphon, whom he had previously met. Death's Head is also shown dying in multiple timelines, including the Days of Future Past timeline. Owing to his nature as a universe-traveling temporal paradox, these futures may all come true across the Marvel Multiverse. Canonically, Death's Head 3.0 is considered a separate character from the previous versions. Death's Head 3.0's robotic race served as an experimental basis for Minion, the cyborg that became Death's Head II.

== Reception and legacy ==
Death's Head was impactful on British Marvel fans of the 1980s, with Kieron Gillen stating that "Death's Head was our Wolverine". Stan Lee was also a fan of Death's Head, and he wrote a letter to Furman and Senior describing their work as "sensational". Comic artist Nick Roche stated that Death's Head is his favorite Marvel character. GamesRadar+ listed Death's Head as the best Marvel character to debut in 1987, saying that he is "a welcome face whenever he appears in comics" and one of Marvel's "quirkiest" characters. On Marvel's website, writer Ryan Penagos noted that despite Death's Head having multiple incarnations such as Death's Head II and 3.0, "the original is still most beloved". An action figure of the character debuted at the 2024 San Diego Comic-Con through Hasbro's Marvel Legends toy line.

Outside of Marvel Comics, Death's Head served as the inspiration for the Transformers villain Lockdown. Lockdown debuted in Transformers: Animated and served as the antagonist of the 2014 live-action film Transformers: Age of Extinction.
