= Spitfire (character) =

- Spitfire as depicted in Spitfire #1 (August 2010). Art by Jenny Frison.

Publication information
- Publisher: Marvel Comics
- First appearance: As Jacqueline Falsworth: The Invaders #7 (July 1976); As Spitfire: The Invaders #12 (December 1976)
- Created by: Roy Thomas (writer); Frank Robbins (artist)

In-story information
- Alter ego: Lady Jacqueline Falsworth Crichton
- Species: Human mutate
- Team affiliations: MI-13; Invaders; Hellfire Club
- Abilities: Superhuman strength, speed, stamina, and sense; Regenerative healing factor; Sharp fangs; Expert hand-to-hand combatant; Trained airplane pilot; Expert athlete

Spitfire (Lady Jacqueline Falsworth Crichton) is a superhero appearing in American comic books published by Marvel Comics. Created by Roy Thomas and Frank Robbins, the character first appeared in The Invaders comic book series as an intended replacement for the Union Jack character, but the costume design did not fit the female torso. Instead, the character of Spitfire, named after the Supermarine Spitfire fighter plane, was created.

== Publication history ==
=== 1970s publications ===
Roy Thomas and Frank Robbins featured Jacqueline Falsworth in The Invaders #7-9 (July–October 1976). In the story she is drained of blood by her vampiric uncle, Baron Blood, as part of his plan to take revenge against her father, Lord Falsworth. Thomas and Robbins concluded the plot-line in The Invaders #11 (December 1976); in the story a life-saving transfusion from original Human Torch Jim Hammond reacts with the vampire bite to give her super-speed, which she uses to take her recently invalided father's place on the team.

Thomas and Robbins continued to feature her in issues of The Invaders, including; #12-13 (January–February 1977), which sees her joining the team on a rescue mission to the Warsaw Ghetto; #14-15 (March–April 1977), which sees her absconding with her father and new hero Dyna-Mite; #18-19 (July–August 1977), which sees the three parachuting into Germany, #20-21 (September–October 1977), which sees them being rescued by her brother, Brian, as the new Union Jack, and #22 (November 1977); which shows her safely returned to England. Thomas and Robbins also featured her in What If? #4 (August 1977); in the story she and Union Jack save Winston Churchill from a Nazi assassination attempt.

Thomas and Robbins continued to feature her in issues of The Invaders, including; #23 (December 1977) & #25 (February 1978), which sees her joining a mission to Egypt; and #26 (March 1978), in which she is introduced to the restored Aubrey in his role as the new Destroyer.

=== 1980s publications ===
Roger Stern and John Byrne gave her a contemporary appearance as an aging dowager whose powers have faded for Captain America #253-254 (January–February 1981); in the story, which features the first appearances of her son Kenneth Crichton and future love interest Joey Chapman, she dismisses the idea of putting on her old costume to join Captain America's final battle against the resurrected Baron Blood.

=== 1990s publications ===
She makes a brief appearance in Fabian Nicieza and Kieron Dwyer's story "The Establishment" for Marvel Comics Presents Vol. 1 #42 (February 1990); in a flashback to events following her previous appearance she is shown to be reluctant to her son Kenneth's suggestion that Joey Chapman continues as Union Jack. While Scott Lobdell and Ian Akin featured her in "Ember When" for the Marvel Super-Heroes Winter Special (vol. 2) #4 (December 1990); the story sees her in wheelchair recovering from cancer until called upon to use her powers to save a young nurse from a mutant ex-boyfriend.

John Byrne featured her again in a fiftieth-anniversary celebration in Namor the Sub-Mariner #12 (March 1991); the story sees the reunion of the Invaders for a mission to rescue Namor, in which she is shot while using her speed to defeat a Nazi scientist and receives a second life-saving blood transfusion from original Human Torch Jim Hammond restoring her youth and powers. Byrne reused the character as support in subsequent volumes, including; #13 (April 1991), to give evidence at Namor's trial; #15 (June 1991), to provide unwelcome relationship advice; Annual #1 (June 1991), to attempt kidnapping Namor for a surprise party; #19 (October 1991), to take over as temporary head of Namor's business; #21 (December 1991), to complete a hostile takeover; #23 (February 1992), to close down the acquired company; and #27 (June 1992), to discuss her own failing business with her son.

Dan Slott and Rita Fagiani featured her and her son Kenneth in "Young Blood" for Marvel Comics Presents #89 (November 1991); the story is about an attempt to steal the secret of youth from her, in which she is depicted as slowly returning to a life of super-heroics and dating following her rejuvenation. While Ron Marz and Tom Raney featured her in "Good Girl" for Namor the Sub-Mariner Annual #2 (July 1992); the story picks up on Namorita's attempts to update her style from Namor the Sub-Mariner #21 and sees her using her powers against a sleazy fashion photographer trying to trick her. She also makes a brief supporting appearance in Fabian Nicieza and Craig Brasfield's The New Warriors #35-36 (May–June 1993); the story sees her having a night out with Namorita and calling her in the morning to check up on her.

She appears as a supporting character in Nicholas Vince and Mark Buckingham's four-issue Mortigan Goth: Immortalis (September 1993-October 1994) mini-series for Marvel UK; the story is about a world-weary immortal and old family friend, who she hopes can cure the vampirism inflicted on another family friend by her long dead uncle.

She appears as a supporting character in Ben Raab and John Cassaday's three-issue Union Jack (December 1998-February 1999) mini-series; the story is about Jack's battle against a sect of vampires that threaten her son Kenneth, in which she is depicted as a wealthy socialite who uses her powers only to rescue Jack from an explosion at Falsworth Manor.

=== 2000s publications ===
She appears as a supporting character in Ben Raab and Charlie Adlard's X-Men: Hellfire Club #3 (March 2000); in the story she tells a reporter about an old friend of her father's, whose modern-day descendant is the leader of the Hellfire Club. She also appears as a supporting character in Fabian Nicieza and Lewis LaRosa's Citizen V and the V-Battalion: The Everlasting #1 (March 2002); the story begins with a flashback showing her and her future husband at Brian Falsworth's funeral in 1953 and reveals she assisted the titular fictional secret organization run by her brother's lover, Roger Aubrey.

She next appears as a supporting character in Chuck Austen and Scott Kolins' Avengers #82-84 (July–August 2004); the story sees the re-formation of the Invaders. Austen along with Allan Jacobsen and C.P. Smith concluded this story in The New Invaders #0 (August 2004), which launched a new ongoing series featuring Spitfire as a regular character. During this run Jacobson and Smith featured her in a number of issues, including; #1-3 (October–December 2004), which reunites her with Jim Hammond and reveals her to be romantically involved with Joey Chapman; #4-5 (January–February 2005), which reveals a psychic connection between her and Hammond and the existence of a vampiric grandson born to her late son and Baroness Blood; and #7-9 (April–June 2005), which sees the dissolution of the team following Hammond's death.

Ed Brubaker and Steve Epting featured her and Joey Chapman in Captain America #18-21 (July–October 2006); in the story Captain America recruits the two heroes, who are no longer dating, to battle old enemy the Red Skull in London.

She briefly appears in Jeph Loeb’s Fallen Son: The Death of Captain America #5 (June–August 2007) alongside Union Jack attending the public funeral of Captain America following his death in Civil War.

=== 2010s publications ===
Paul Cornell and Elena Casagrande featured her in the Women of Marvel one-shot Spitfire (October 2010).

== Fictional character biography ==
=== Birth and early life ===
Jacqueline "Jackie" Falsworth was born in Maidstone, England, and is the daughter of the original Union Jack (and the sister of Union Jack II).

=== Life during World War II ===
As a teenager during World War II, she met the superhuman team the Invaders. Baron Blood attacked her, and the original Human Torch rescued her. She was revealed to have been bitten by Baron Blood, who abducted her again; this time she was rescued by Captain America. She received a transfusion of artificial blood from the Human Torch, which endowed her with superhuman speed. She used these new powers to save the Torch from the Blue Bullet. She became an adventurer and took the name Spitfire and joined the Invaders, and went on her first mission with the Invaders. She operated as a special agent for the United Kingdom and Allied Forces during World War II, as well as the United Kingdom's Home Guard.

With the Invaders, she parachuted into Nazi Germany. She was captured by the Nazis, and was about to be executed when she was rescued by Union Jack. She battled Warrior Woman, and escaped from Germany with the Invaders. With the Invaders, she fought the Teutonic Knight, and helped prevent the assassination of Winston Churchill by Baron Von Strucker. Alongside the Invaders, she clashed with Master Man, and freed the Mighty Destroyer from captivity. After some time off, she returned to active duty with the Invaders. At the war's end, Jacqueline retired from costumed activity.

=== Semi-retirement ===
After the war Lady Falsworth, her brother and her father assisted a secret organization called V-Battalion up until her brother's death in a car accident in 1953. Around this time she married a British nobleman, Lord Crichton, and together they had a son, Kenneth Crichton. She also became the CEO of Falsworth Industries. During this period, her super-speed faded as she grew older.

She was present during Captain America's final battle with the original Baron Blood at Falsworth Manor, during this battle her son's friend Joey Chapman took over the role as Union Jack. Following the death of her father in the aftermath of the incident, she reluctantly agreed to allow Chapman to continue in the role of Union, formerly held by her father and brother. Although she had dismissed the idea of putting on her costume to assist Captain America defeat Baron Blood, she was able to summon her super-speed for the first time in a decade to save a nurse at the hospital where she was receiving treatment from a mutant ex-boyfriend.

Jacqueline later aided Namorita and Union Jack in a mission to rescue Namor from the original Master Man and Warrior Woman, during which she was shot. She received another life-saving blood transfusion from the Human Torch which not only restored her youth and powers, but also established a psychic link between her and the Torch. After going public to explain her rejuvenation in the media, her son Kenneth was kidnapped by Selene, who wished to vivisect her to learn the secret of eternal youth; but as Spitfire she was able to rescue Kenneth just as the bomb he had been strapped to was triggered.

While planning a Christmas party at Falsworth Manor, Jacqueline called for a doctor to care for her ailing son, Kenneth, but ignored warnings from Union Jack, that Joey Chapman was being led down a dark path. The Christmas party was disrupted by a vampire cult led by Baroness Blood, and when the cult set off a bomb, Jacqueline used her powers to rescue Chapman from the explosion. Jacqueline spent the next eight months mourning the death of her son who had been seduced, turned into the new Baron Blood and ultimately left to die by the Baroness.

=== Return to action with the New Invaders ===
She later joined The New Invaders, but resigned with most of the other members after the Torch's death. She also had a brief relationship with Chapman, but they broke up due to the large age difference.

She joins MI-13 as part of Britain's response to the Secret Invasion by the Skrull Empire. She befriends, and later suffers the loss of 'John', a Skrull that had been on earth for decades and was fighting for England. In battle with two Super-Skrulls, Spitfire rips out their throats with her teeth, displaying vampire traits from her Baron Blood bite that have been previously unseen. Captain Britain and MI13 writer Paul Cornell commented on her new traits, stating that:

In recent years she's realized that she has actually started to be able to use certain vampiric abilities, and that the fangs appear when she gets angry. But she feels no blood lust, and has no need to drink it, and it's all completely under her control.

— Paul Cornell

Even Spitfire herself shows some reservations about using her vampiric powers, as seen in the aforementioned attack on the Super-Skrulls:

This is not how I am. But sometimes, this is how I have to be.

—

When new MI13 recruit and vampire hunter Blade first meets Spitfire, he stakes her. She survives only thanks to the powers of fellow MI13 member Faiza Hussain and later begins a romantic relationship with Blade. During Dracula's attack on Britain, Jacqueline's vampire son Kenneth visited her and led her into a trap, where Dracula magically forced her into servitude. While she initially resisted, it seemed that he was eventually able to convince her to become one of his minions; it was later revealed that Spitfire has been a double-agent the whole time, always helping Wisdom in gaining intelligence on Dracula's whereabouts.

As part of the Marvel NOW! event, Spitfire was seen assisting Captain Britain in running the Braddock Academy (the British answer to the Avengers Academy).

== Powers and abilities ==
Jacqueline received superhuman powers as a result of a mutagenic reaction to a vampiric bite by the original Baron Blood, and a subsequent transfusion of artificial blood from the original Human Torch. As Spitfire, she possesses the ability to run at lightning-fast speeds, with reflexes, reactions, coordination, agility, and endurance to match. When she runs, a trail of non-damaging fire appears behind her. She can create cyclones by running in circles, and can run up walls and across water. Her skin is also hardened to withstand the rigors of such speed, providing a type of body armor, and her costume is synthetic stretch fabric chemically treated for protection from friction and other hazards of superhuman speed.

In the years after World War II, as Spitfire aged she ceased the use of her superhuman speed. Due to a second transfusion of artificial blood from the original Human Torch, Spitfire today has the body of a teenage girl, although she is chronologically many decades older. Her hair was originally still white from age, but it began turning blonde again.

It is said by the mutant sorceress, Selene, that Spitfire seems to possess a mutant regenerative power triggered by her transfusion of synthetic blood. With intensive study of her metabolism, blood stream, and glandular system, Selene hoped to one day duplicate the process.

She has some vampire abilities including fangs that appear when she is angry. However, she feels no blood lust and has no need to drink blood. She has shown superhuman strength sufficient to break a sword made out of titanium, and also displayed a healing factor, as she was able to heal a broken back and ribs in a few panels.

Spitfire is a trained airplane pilot and exceptional athlete and hand-to-hand combatant, utilizing her ability to move at superhuman speeds, due to training by the original Union Jack and Captain America.

== Reception ==
=== Accolades ===
- In 2018, CBR.com ranked Spitfire 22nd in their "25 Fastest Characters In The Marvel Universe" list.
- In 2019, CBR.com ranked Spitfire 6th in their "Top 15 British Superheroes in the Marvel Universe" list.
- In 2020, Scary Mommy included Spitfire in their "Looking For A Role Model? These 195+ Marvel Female Characters Are Truly Heroic" list.
- In 2021, Screen Rant included Spitfire in their "10 Best British Heroes Fans Would Love To See In The MCU" list.
- In 2021, CBR.com ranked Spitfire 14th in their "Marvel: The 20 Fastest Speedsters" list.

== In other media ==
- Spitfire appears as a playable character in Marvel Avengers Alliance.
- Spitfire appears as a playable character in Lego Marvel's Avengers.

== Collected editions ==
Spitfire's major appearances have been collected in a number of trade paperbacks:

- Invaders Classic (written by Roy Thomas, with pencils by Frank Robbins and inks by Vince Colletta/Frank Springer):
  - Volume 1 (includes Invaders #1-9, July - October 1976, tpb, 248 pages, July 2007, ISBN 0-7851-2706-2)
  - Volume 2 (includes Invaders #10-21, November 1976 - October 1977, tpb, 240 pages, July 2008, ISBN 0-7851-3120-5)
- Captain America: War and Remembrance (by John Byrne and Roger Stern, with pencils by John Byrne and inks by Josef Rubinstein, TPB includes Captain America #253-254, 1981, 208 pages, July 2007, ISBN 0-7851-2693-7)
- Union Jack (written by John Cassaday and Ben Raab, with art by John Cassaday, 3-issue mini-series, December 1998 - February 1999, TPB, 96 pages, April 2002, ISBN 0-7851-0934-X)
- New Invaders: To End All Wars (written by Allan Jacobsen, with art by Jorge Lucas and C. P. Smith, TPB collects New Invaders #1-9, October 2004 - June 2005, 216 pages, July 2005, ISBN 0-7851-1449-1)
- Captain America: Red Menace Volume 2 (written by Ed Brubaker with art by Steve Epting, TPB collects Captain America #18-21, July - October 2006, 104 pages, December 2006, ISBN 0-7851-2225-7)
- Spitfire (2010) #1 (October 2010) one-shot collected in Women of Marvel (Mighty Marvel) TPB that also collects X-23 (2010 3rd Series) #1 (November 2010) and the Women of Marvel one-shots Sif (2010) #1 (June 2010) Firestar (2010) #1 (June 2010) Rescue (2010) #1 (July 2010) Dazzler (2010) #1 (July 2010) Galacta: Daughter of Galactus (2010) #1 (July 2010) Namora (2010) #1 (August 2010) Lady Deadpool (2010) #1 (September 2010) Valkyrie (2010) #1 (November 2010) and Women of Marvel (2010) #1 - 2 (January - February 2011) 352 pages, February 2011, ISBN 0-7851-4953-8
