= Warrior woman =

Warrior woman or Woman Warrior may refer to:

== Literature and comics ==
- Women warriors in literature and culture, an archetype in legend and literature
- The Woman Warrior (1975), a memoir by Maxine Hong Kingston
- Warrior Woman (Marvel Comics), a Marvel Comics supervillain character
- Hippolyta (Marvel Comics), a Marvel Comics supervillain turned superhero, who also uses the alias "Warrior Woman"

== Other uses ==
- "Warrior Woman", a single by Carol Kenyon
- War Goddess, a 1973 Italian adventure fantasy drama, directed by Terence Young

== See also ==
- Women in ancient warfare
- List of women warriors in folklore
