= Union Jack (Marvel Comics) =

- James Falsworth as the original Union Jack as appeared on the cover of Invaders #8 (September 1976). Art by Jack Kirby.

Publication information
- Publisher: Marvel Comics
- First appearance: (James); The Invaders #7 (July 1976) (Brian) (as Destroyer); The Invaders #18 (July 1977) (as Union Jack); The Invaders #21 (October 1977)
- Created by: (James and Brian); Roy Thomas; Frank Robbins

In-story information
- Alter ego: -Lord James Falsworth -Brian Falsworth -Joseph Chapman
- Team affiliations: (All); Invaders (James); British Army; Freedom's Five (Brian); V-Battalion (Joey); The Union
- Notable aliases: (Brian); The Mighty Destroyer
- Abilities: (James); Superb athlete, expert hand-to-hand combatant, espionage training, skilled in the use of a dagger and a handgun (Brian); Enhanced peak human condition, superb athlete, expert hand-to-hand combatant, ability to project bolts of magical lightning

Union Jack is the name of three superheroes appearing in American comic books published by Marvel Comics. Created by Roy Thomas and Frank Robbins, the first Union Jack (James Montgomery Falsworth) first appeared in Invaders #7 (July 1976). A second incarnation (Brian Falsworth) from the same creators appeared in The Invaders #21, and a third incarnation (Joseph Chapman) was created by Roger Stern and John Byrne for Captain America Vol. 1 #254 (February 1981).

Following The Invaders, Union Jack has been featured as a regular character in the ongoing series Knights of Pendragon, New Invaders and Invaders Now, as well two self-titled mini-series.

JJ Feild portrayed James Falsworth in the Marvel Cinematic Universe film Captain America: The First Avenger, where the character is depicted as a member of the Howling Commandos.

== Publication history ==
=== 1970s publications ===
Roy Thomas and Frank Robbins introduced the original Union Jack, James Montgomery Falsworth, as a retired country squire in The Invaders #7-9 (July–October 1976); in the story flashbacks show him in action in World War I as part of Freedom's Five and battling the original Baron Blood, later revealed to be his own brother, while in the present day his brief membership of the Invaders ends when he is invalided saving his daughter, Jacqueline Falsworth, from his vampiric brother. Thomas and Robbins concluded the plot-line in The Invaders #11 (December 1976); in the story his newly empowered daughter takes his place on the team as Spitfire.

Thomas and Robbins continued to feature Lord Falsworth in a number of volumes, including #12 (January 1977), which sees him watching his daughter head off on her first mission with the team; #14-15 (March–April 1977), which sees him absconding with her and new hero Dyna-Mite and #18-19 (July–August 1977), which sees the three parachuting into Nazi Germany on a mission to restore the latter's memory; flashback reveals that Dyna-Mite is Roger Aubrey, the best friend of Lord Falsworth's son, and that the two had been imprisoned by the Nazis while on a peace mission to Berlin.

Thomas and Robbins also first featured Lord Falsworth's son and successor Brian in his previous guise as the Destroyer in Invaders #18-19 (July–August 1977); in the story he explains how he received a variation of the super-soldier formula from a fellow inmate while in a Nazi prison. Thomas and Robbins concluded the plot-line in The Invaders #20-21 (September–October 1977); in the story Brian takes over his father's role of Union Jack to rescue his sister and the rest of the team while Lord Falsworth helps to steal a plane to get them home, and in Invaders #22 (November 1977); in which they are both safely returned to England. Thomas and Robbins also featured Brian in What If? #4 (August 1977); in the story he and Spitfire save Winston Churchill from a Nazi assassination attempt.

Thomas and Robbins continued to feature both Falsworths in the series, with the younger becoming a semi-permanent member of the team with issues #23 (December 1977) & #25 (February 1978); in which he joins them on his first mission, while the older appeared in a supporting role in issue #23 (December 1977), in which he helps Dyna-Mite's search for a cure to his size reduction, and #26 (March 1978); in which he introduces Brian to the restored Aubrey in his role as the new Destroyer.

=== 1980s publications ===
Roger Stern and John Byrne gave Lord Falsworth a contemporary appearance as an elderly country gentleman using a wheelchair for Captain America Vol. 1 #253-254 (January–February 1981); in the story, which features the first appearances of his second successor Joey Chapman, he tries to put on his old costume to join Captain America's final battle against his vampiric brother, Baron Blood, and dies of natural causes in the epilogue; the story also reveals that Brian Falsworth had died in a car crash in 1953.

=== 1990s publications ===
Dan Slott and James W. Fry III featured Brian Falsworth in a World War II-era story for Midnight Sons Unlimited #9 (May 1995); in the story he teams up with the Blazing Skull to defend a fundraiser he is hosting from a Nazi attack.

=== 2000s publications ===
Lord Falsworth appears as a supporting character in Fabian Nicieza and Lewis LaRosa's Citizen V and the V-Battalion: The Everlasting #1 (March 2002); the story begins with a flashback showing him at Brian Falsworth's funeral in 1953 and reveals he assisted the titular fictional secret organization run by his son's lover, Roger Aubrey.

=== 2010s publications ===
Kyle Higgins, Alec Siegel and Pepe Larraz featured the Brian Falsworth incarnation in the World War II flashback story Crossfire for the 70th Anniversary Issue Captain America #616 (May 2011); in the story Captain America and Union Jack defend a French town under Nazi siege.

=== 2020s publications ===
Union Jack is a member of the British super team The Union created by Paul Grist and Andrea Di Vito.

== Fictional character biography ==
=== James Montgomery Falsworth ===
A peer of the realm as Lord Falsworth, James Montgomery Falsworth is first active as the adventurer and British government operative Union Jack during World War I. During his adventures as a member of Freedom's Five, he encounters the mysterious Baron Blood, a vampire saboteur for the Germans. After the war, Lord Falsworth retires to his ancestral home in England to raise a family.

He is active again as Union Jack during World War II. He becomes a member of the Invaders after the original Human Torch saves his daughter — Jacqueline Falsworth — from Baron Blood. Jacqueline is revived by a blood transfusion from the Human Torch which grants her the power of super-speed. As a result, she becomes the costumed hero Spitfire (a title she still holds in the 21st Century). After the attack, Lord Falsworth offers up his mansion as the Invaders' base of operations. After Baron Blood's attack on Jacqueline, James discovers the vampire is actually his brother, John. During a battle, Blood crushes Union Jack's legs under a boulder, effectively ending his career as a hero. Before the battle ends, James is able to impale Blood on a silver-veined stalagmite. Soon after, he quits the Invaders.

Although unable to use his legs, James later travels with Spitfire and Dyna-Mite, parachuting into Nazi Germany. There they meet up with James' son, Brian, whom they were searching for. Falsworth and Dyna-Mite were captured by the Nazis, but are then rescued by Brian. Originally thinking his son a traitor, James learns that Brian fights against the Nazis as the costumed hero, the Destroyer. As a result, the two reconcile their differences and James passes the mantle of Union Jack on to Brian, at which point Brian abandons his Destroyer identity.

Years later, James contacts Captain America to combat Baron Blood. Falsworth finally sees the end of Baron Blood with the help of Captain America and the third incarnation of Union Jack (Joey Chapman). After this episode, James dies from natural causes.

=== Brian Falsworth ===
Brian Falsworth as Union Jack, as appeared on the cover of Invaders #20 (September 1977). Art by Gil Kane.

Brian Falsworth is the son of James Montgomery Falsworth. Initially, Brian and his friend Roger are sympathetic toward Germany and supportive of peace between it and the United Kingdom. Toward the end of the 1930s, the pair go into Germany, but quickly discover the evil nature of the Nazi regime. Brian is thrown in prison, and Roger is given to German scientists.

Brian gains the peak of human potential through the help of a dying German scientist who tried to recreate the Super Soldier Formula that resulted in Captain America. Brian escapes prison and becomes a costumed Nazi-fighter within Germany, calling himself the Destroyer. Meanwhile, Roger is used for experiments; he is brainwashed and his body reduced in size. Standing one foot tall but with the strength of a full-sized man, he is given the name Dyna-Mite. With his memory gone, the Nazis unleash Dyna-Mite against the Allies, in a plot which involves the Crusaders.

In the wake of the foiled attack, Lord Falsworth and Spitfire deduce Dyna-Mite's identity and sneak into Germany to look for Brian. Ultimately, they find out the truth behind Dyna-Mite, and Roger's memory is restored. Brian, reuniting with his family and reconciling with his father, learns of his father's former costumed identity as Union Jack, dons the costume and battles Nazi soldiers and Master Man alongside Captain America. Brian subsequently adopts the Union Jack identity as an adventurer and British government operative in place of his disabled father, joining the Invaders. Roger, in turn, takes on the mantle of the Destroyer after his normal size is restored.

Brian is hit by magical lightning during a confrontation with Thor, who had been disguised as Joseph Stalin, and gains electrical superpowers. Following the war, Brian remains active as Union Jack, and is instrumental in founding the V-Battalion alongside Roger Aubrey, who was revealed to be his lover in the 2002 series Citizen V and the V Battalion. In 1953, Brian is killed in a car crash.

== Powers and abilities ==
James Montgomery Falsworth was an athletic man who possessed no superhuman powers. However, he was trained in the field of espionage, a veteran of two world wars, and highly trained in armed and unarmed combat. He wore a bullet-proof costume and carried a 6-inch dagger and a Webley .455 revolver, both of which he used with great skill. Falsworth began using a wheelchair in 1942 and was debilitated by extreme old age at the time of his death.

During his initial career as the second Union Jack, Brian Falsworth possessed no superhuman powers. He was a superbly athletic man, but, having been exposed to a variant of the Super Soldier Formula, was enhanced to the peak of human potential, and was highly trained in armed and unarmed combat. Like his father, he wore bulletproof fabric and primarily used a Webley .455 revolver and a 6-inch dagger. After an encounter with Thor later in his career, he gained the ability to discharge bolts of mystic lightning from his fingertips after his body was energized by a lightning strike.

Like those who held the title of Union Jack before him, Joey Chapman is an athlete in peak physical condition. In addition, his strength, speed, and stamina are enhanced by the Power of the Pendragon. Chapman usually carries a handgun of some variety (changing it as appropriate to the mission) and a silver-edged dagger used for supernatural foes.

== Other versions ==
On Earth 4904, Brian Falsworth exists as Byron Falsworth / Major Commonwealth, a Captain Britain Corps member who appeared in Mighty World Of Marvel (vol. 2) #13.

== In other media ==
=== Film ===
James Montgomery Falsworth appears in Captain America: The First Avenger (2011), portrayed by JJ Feild. This version is one of several POW's who were held at a Hydra factory before they are liberated by Captain America and subsequently join his Howling Commandos.

=== Video games ===
- James Montgomery Falsworth appears in Captain America: Super Soldier, voiced by JJ Feild.
- The James Falsworth incarnation of Union Jack appears as a playable character in Marvel: Avengers Alliance.
- The James Falsworth incarnation of Union Jack appears as a playable character in Lego Marvel Super Heroes.
- The James Falsworth incarnation of Union Jack appears as a playable character in Lego Marvel's Avengers.
- The Brian Falsworth incarnation of Union Jack appears as a playable character in Marvel Avengers Academy.

== Collected editions ==
Union Jack's major appearances have been collected in a number of trade paperbacks:

- Invaders Classic (written by Roy Thomas, with pencils by Frank Robbins and inks by Vince Colletta/Frank Springer):
  - Volume 1 (includes Invaders #7-9, July - October 1976, tpb, 248 pages, July 2007, ISBN 0-7851-2706-2)
  - Volume 2 (includes Invaders #10-21, November 1976 - October 1977, tpb, 240 pages, July 2008, ISBN 0-7851-3120-5)
  - Volume 3 (collects Invaders #22-23 and #25-34, 224 pages, February 2009, ISBN 0-7851-3720-3)
- Captain America: War and Remembrance (by John Byrne and Roger Stern, with pencils by John Byrne and inks by Josef Rubinstein, tpb includes Captain America #253-254, 1981, 208 pages, July 2007, ISBN 0-7851-2693-7)
- Union Jack (written by John Cassaday and Ben Raab, with art by John Cassaday, three-issue miniseries, December 1998 - February 1999, tpb, 96 pages, April 2002, ISBN 0-7851-0934-X)
- New Invaders: To End All Wars (written by Allan Jacobsen, with art by Jorge Lucas and C. P. Smith, tpb collects New Invaders #1-9, October 2004 - June 2005, 216 pages, July 2005, ISBN 0-7851-1449-1)
- Captain America: Red Menace Volume 2 (written by Ed Brubaker with art by Steve Epting, tpb collects Captain America #18-21, July - October 2006, 104 pages, December 2006, ISBN 0-7851-2225-7)
- Union Jack: London Falling (written by Christos Gage, with pencils by Mike Perkins and inks by Drew Hennessy, four-issue miniseries, November 2006 - February 2007, tpb, 96 pages, July 2007, ISBN 0-7851-2181-1)
- Avengers/Invaders (collects Avengers/Invaders #1-4, hardcover, 96 pages, September 2009, ISBN 0-7851-2942-1)
