= Ten-Eyed Man =

The Ten-Eyed Man
- Philip Reardon in his first appearance as depicted in Batman #226 (Nov. 1970). Art by Irv Novick

Publication information
- Publisher: DC Comics
- First appearance: Batman #226 (November 1970)
- Created by: Frank Robbins (writer); Irv Novick (artist)

In-story information
- Alter ego: Philip Reardon
- Species: Metahuman
- Notable aliases: "Three-Eye" Reardon "Ten-Eyed" Reardon
- Abilities: 360° and limited periscopic vision Superb hand-to-hand combatant Skilled marksman Magic user

The Ten-Eyed Man (Philip Reardon) is a fictional character in DC Comics. Philip Reardon started out as a Vietnam War veteran-turned-security guard who was blinded in a warehouse explosion and gained the ability to see through his fingertips thanks to an experimental procedure by a brilliant ophthalmologist.

== Publication history ==
Ten-Eyed Man first appeared in Batman #226 (Nov. 1970) and was created by Frank Robbins and Irv Novick.

He would later undergo a redesign with a supervillain costume, Ten-Eyed Man codename, and special equipment in Man-Bat #2 (March 1976).

== Fictional character biography ==
=== Pre-Crisis ===
Philip Reardon was a soldier in the U.S. Special Forces during the Vietnam War until he was honorably discharged after a grenade fragment hit him between the eyes, leaving a scar which gave him the nickname "Three-Eyed Reardon". He returned to civilian life as a warehouse security guard. One night, he was knocked out by thieves who planted a bomb to destroy the warehouse. When Batman arrived at the scene, Reardon recovered, but his vision was blurred. Mistaking Batman for one of the thieves, Reardon battled him. When he recognized Batman, the warehouse exploded and Reardon's retinas were burned, blinding him. Wanting to make use of Reardon, the thieves take him to a doctor, who states that his eyes cannot be repaired. Ophthalmologist Dr. Engstrom tends to Reardon, performing an experimental procedure that connects his optic nerves to the sensory cells in his fingertips and enables him to see through them. Reardon blames Batman for what had happened and tries to take revenge on him. As Batman was also affected by the blast, he uses black contact lenses to aid his vision. As Reardon attacks Batman, Alfred Pennyworth helps Batman by coordinating instructions to him through the microphone in his mask. After finding out that Reardon can see through his hands, Batman wraps up Reardon's hands in his cape and then knocks him unconscious. After regaining consciousness, Reardon escapes.

Waking up one night in his apartment following a nightmare involving Batman attacking him with a flamethrower, Philip Reardon finds himself unable to see, thinking that Batman blinded him again, only to remember that he had placed gloves on his hands to protect his nerves, since his "eyes" lack eyelids. He then goes to apply for a job as an air marshal, which he passes with his talents and starts making plans to get revenge on Batman. After hijacking an airplane to lure Batman to Vietnam, Reardon leads Batman on a chase through the jungle before being defeated.

=== Redesign as a Man-Bat villain ===
When incarcerated at Gotham State Penitentiary, Readon has his hands locked in a special opaque box to restrict his vision. Director Lowell has him released from prison. While Reardon's nerve grafts were failing him, Lowell has him go after Man-Bat and capture him. Reardon is given a costume that includes opaque goggles and goes after Man-Bat. Ten-Eyed Man is defeated by Man-Bat and falls off the building to his apparent death.

During the "Crisis on Infinite Earths" storyline, Ten-Eyed Man is killed by Anti-Monitor's shadow demons.

=== The New 52 ===
In September 2011, The New 52 rebooted DC's continuity. In this new timeline, Ten-Eyed Man first appears among the inmates at Arkham Asylum who attack Batwing and Jim Corrigan.

=== DC Rebirth ===
In 2016, DC Comics implemented a relaunch of its books called "DC Rebirth", restoring its continuity to a form much as it was prior to "The New 52". In the series Batman Eternal, Ten-Eyed Man kidnaps a girl named Jade who is under Killer Croc's protection and plans to sacrifice her to find out the doom that is coming for him. He sees Batman, Killer Croc, and Jason Bard above as they leap down towards him. Batman, Bard, and Killer Croc stop Ten-Eyed Man before he can sacrifice Jade so that he can open an inter-dimensional portal.

Following Arkham Asylum's destruction, its inmates are transferred to the Gotham City Police Department. Maggie Sawyer tries to get the answers on what happened there from the inmates, starting with Ten-Eyed Man. He tells Maggie that he can help her with the answers she needs if she would remove the hand masks from his hands. After being unable to get answers from Ten-Eyed Man, Sawyer attempts to get answers from Maxie Zeus, Magpie, and other inmates.

In the miniseries "Arkham City: The Order of the World", which takes place before the "Fear State" storyline, Ten-Eyed Man is incarcerated in Arkham Asylum. At one point, he had learned how to use magic and sported a new costume. Ten-Eyed Man is later attacked by Azrael and rendered blind in one hand.

Ten-Eyed Man visits the pizzeria Eat By the Slice and finds it closed. Upon entering it, Ten-Eyed Man confronts Pete and sees a hole in his head. Unable to make out what caused the hole, Ten-Eyed Man knocks out Pete with a spell from his finger and heads to the hospital. He then chases after a nurse upon seeing what she had in her hand and was subdued by security guards. Ten-Eyed Man relates his story to Commissioner Renee Montoya, who has the guard give him a pizza. Then Ten-Eyed Man uses his finger to see that there is a "hole" in Montoya's head and escapes his cell through a hole, which Montoya describes as the "hole in the world".

== Powers and abilities ==
Ten-Eyed Man can see through optic nerves in his fingertips, giving him a complete 360 view and limited periscopic vision. His enhanced vision augments his Special Forces training, making him a superb fighter and marksman. In the "DC Rebirth" continuity, he is also a skilled magic user.

=== Equipment ===
During his fight with Man-Bat, Ten-Eyed Man was provided a jet pack and a latex spray.

=== Weakness ===
As a side-effect of his optic nerves being in his fingertips, Ten-Eyed Man's hands are sensitive and vulnerable to any kind of excessive force.

In the "DC Rebirth" continuity, Ten-Eyed Man has schizophrenia.

== Alternative versions ==
The Ten-Eyed Men of the Empty Quarter, a Middle Eastern tribe of demon hunters inspired by Ten-Eyed Man, appear in 52.

== In other media ==
- Ten-Eyed Man appears in Batman: The Brave and the Bold, voiced by Robin Atkin Downes.
- Ten-Eyed Man makes a non-speaking cameo appearance in Scooby-Doo! & Batman: The Brave and the Bold.
- Ten-Eyed Man appears in Teen Titans Go! #9.
- Ten-Eyed Man appears in The Batman & Scooby-Doo Mysteries #12.

== See also ==
- List of Batman family enemies
