= The Union (Marvel) =

The Union (Britannia Project)

Publication information
- Publisher: Marvel Comics
- First appearance: The Union #1 (2020) (part of King in Black)
- Created by: Paul Grist (writer); Andrea Di Vito (illustrator)

In-story information
- Type of organisation: Superhero
- Base(s): United Kingdom
- Agent(s): Britannia (Tanya); Union Jack; Kelpie; The Choir (Ruth); Snakes; Bulldog

Roster

The Union is a UK superhero team that appears in comic books published by Marvel Comics. The Union debuted during a crossover event called "King in Black" in 2020–2021. As of 2026, the original five-issue limited series remains their only lead appearance.

== Publication history ==
The Union is a five issue mini series that first appeared in December 2020 with Union #1. It was originally due to be released as a part of the "Empyre" event, but was moved and rewritten to fit into the "King in Black" event due to issues caused by the COVID-19 pandemic.

The series was written by Paul Grist, known for his work on Judge Dredd and Jack Staff, with art by Andrea Di Vito, known for Annihilation and Conan. Inks were provided by Drew Geraci and Le Beau Underwood, with colours by Nolan Woodard. In an interview, Grist described the team's political backdrop as intentional, framing the Britannia Project as a government attempt to restore unity at a time when the UK's national bond is "being seriously tested."

=== The Union (comics) ===
King in Black
Issue No	Release	Publisher	Created by
1	2 December 2020	Marvel	Paul Grist (writer) Andrea Di Vito (illustrator)
2	13 January 2021	Marvel	Paul Grist (writer) Andrea Di Vito (illustrator)
3	24 February 2021	Marvel	Paul Grist (writer) Andrea Di Vito (illustrator)
4	31 March 2021	Marvel	Paul Grist (writer) Andrea Di Vito (illustrator)
5	5 May 2024	Marvel	Paul Grist (writer) Andrea Di Vito (illustrator)

Special releases
Name	Release	ISBN	Publisher	Created by	Type	Citation
The Union: The Britannia Project	7 July 2021	ISBN 9781302938680	Marvel	Paul Grist (writer) Andrea Di Vito (illustrator)	Trade Paper Back (TPB)	

== Publication history ==
- On 2 December 2020, The Union appeared in The Union #1 as part of the King in Black crossover event.
- On 29 September 2021, The Union appeared in Marvels #5. (Note: Cameo appearance only in flashbacks)
- On 15 May 2024, The Union appeared in Union Jack the Ripper: Blood Hunt #1-3 with Bulldog featuring as a supporting character.

== Fictional team history ==
The Union was formed by the British government as publicity attempt to restore faith in the UK. The team's formation is funded by billionaire Steve Darwin and was the dream of superhero Britannia who wished to see super-powered representatives from across the UK serve Queen and country.

The members, who represent different parts of the UK, work together to face a variety of enemies. These include Knull, Doc Croc, Sponge, assorted vampires, and Baron Blood. Led by Britannia, the Union has protected the nation and united the super-powered heroes of its past and future.

The team's first mission immediately goes awry when their public debut is interrupted by the symbiote invasion led by Knull. Britannia is killed by a symbiote dragon, leaving the team leaderless and demoralised. Her spirit subsequently takes up residence within Union Jack, guiding him and enhancing his abilities. Bulldog is later recruited to fill the vacancy left by Britannia's death. The team eventually overcomes internal divisions—including the betrayal of The Choir, who defects to the villains—and successfully defeats the Doc Croc Gang.

== Characters ==
- **Britannia** – Britannia, representing the United Kingdom as a whole, was the initial leader of the team. She was a powerful warrior that wore a dark and light contrasting blue outfit with a red cloak. She was seen wielding a sword and shield, as well as a trident. After being killed by a symbiote dragon, her spirit resided within Union Jack, to protect him from harm and enhance his strength.
- **Union Jack** – Representative of England in the team and current leader, he is the only pre-existing character in the Union, and the latest man to bear the name of a character who first appeared in The Invaders.
- **Kelpie** – Representative of Scotland in the team. She is referred to as "an ancient water demon found living in a Scottish lake." She has the power to control water, as well as being able to transform her hands into sharp claws.
- **The Choir** – Representative of Wales in the team. She has black hair with a bright green strip across the top, and she is dressed in a glowing green and black contrasting outfit with a blue cloak and she wields a dagger. She is described as having "a voice that can shatter stone." During the attack on Earth by Knull, the Choir is infected by a symbiote. She is freed of Knull's control through the efforts of the Union, but later defects to work alongside Doc Croc and his team.
- **Snakes** – Representative of Northern Ireland in the team. Snakes is a sentient collection of snakes formed together in the shape of a human. He is described as having "the strength of ten men."
- **Bulldog** – Joining the team as a replacement for Britannia after her death, Bulldog was a short man who displays super-strength and enhanced agility. He wore a red and grey jumpsuit and black boots. In Union Jack the Ripper #2, Bulldog is turned into a vampire. Bulldog is killed in Union Jack the Ripper #3.

=== Roster ===
The Union roster has gone through a number of changes, including members leaving and joining the team and being present in a spirit form. Current member are indicated in bold, leaders are highlighted in gold.

==== Current roster ====
The Union
Team Member	The Union (Comic)					The Marvels	Union Jack: Blood Hunt		
Team Member	1	2	3	4	5	5	1	2	3
**Union Jack**	Yes	Yes	Yes	Yes	Yes	Yes	No	(Note: appears as cameo)	No
**Kelpie**	Yes	Yes	Yes	Yes	Yes	Yes	No	(Note: appears as cameo)	No
**The Choir**	Yes	Yes	Yes	No (Note: see other characters (Enemies) section)	Yes	Yes	No	No	No
**Snakes**	Yes	Yes	Yes	Yes	Yes	Yes	No	No	No
No of Members	5	4	5	4	6	5	N/A	2 (Note: See deceased members that feature as cameos in Union Jack: Blood Hunt #2)	N/A

==== Deceased members ====
Team Member	The Union (Comic)					The Marvels	Union Jack: Blood Hunt		
Team Member	1	2	3	4	5	5	1	2	3
**Britannia**	Yes	No	No	No	(Note: but in The Union #5 he is eventually stopped through the combined efforts of Union Jack and the spirit of Britannia.)	No	No	(Note: appears as a cameo)	No
**Bulldog**	No	No	Yes	Yes	Yes	Yes	Yes	Yes (Note: Bulldog is turning into a vampire in Union Jack: Blood Hunt #2)	No (Note: see other characters (Enemies) section)

== Supporting characters ==
=== Allies ===
- Selwyn James (Government Minister with special responsibility for super heroes), the head of the Britannia Project, and the Union's government liaison. Later revealed to be ex-supervillain The Sponge
- Steve Darwin (Leader of the Britannia Project)
- Mara Syal
- Captain America
- Captain Britain

=== Enemies ===
- Knull
- Doc Croc Gang – A group of criminals, introduced in The Union #3.
  - Doc Croc/Croker Dyle – A criminal who shoots solid light bands from his wrist-mounted gauntlets, introduced in The Union #3.
  - Sponge/Selwlyn James – A power-draining criminal, introduced in The Union #1.
  - Skreem/The Choir – A criminal with a sonic wave scream, introduced in The Union #1, first full appearance in The Union #4.
  - Volcanna/Anna – A female criminal who wears an armoured suit to help her control her combustion abilities and is also an expert at hand-to-hand combat, introduced in The Union #4.
  - Lady Shimmering Lights – A female supervillain who uses the lights she emits to hypnotise and captivate anyone, introduced in The Union #4.
  - Shifter – A shapeshifting criminal who can transform into different animals, introduced in The Union #3, later killed by Sponge.
  - Craig – The cybernetically enhanced Corgi created by Doc Croc who can release sleeping gas, introduced in The Union #4.
- Hunger
- Baron Blood

== Reception ==
The Union received mixed reviews from readers across the United Kingdom, with some of the Scottish and Welsh people disagreeing with the name of the group and how their characters Kelpie (Scotland) & The Choir (Wales) portray the two countries.

The announcement of the team also attracted attention on social media, with some Scottish and Welsh readers objecting to the team's name—"The Union"—given its political connotations, particularly in the context of Brexit and Scottish independence.

== See also ==
- List of Marvel Comics teams and organizations
- Lists of Marvel Comics characters
- Union Jack (Marvel Comics)
