= Golem (Marvel Comics) =

Marvel Comics fictional character

The Golem is the name of a number of fictional characters appearing in American comic books published by Marvel Comics. These include:

== Monster ==
Golem
- Cover to Strange Tales #174 (June 1974). Pencils by Gil Kane, inks by Dick Giordano, or possibly Tony DeZuniga and John Romita.

Publication information
- Publisher: Marvel Comics
- First appearance: Strange Tales #174 (June 1974)
- Created by: Len Wein; John Buscema

In-story information
- Alter ego: not applicable
- Team affiliations: S.H.I.E.L.D. Howling Commandos
- Abilities: Supernatural strength and durability

=== Publication history ===
The Golem first appeared in Strange Tales #174 (June 1974), and was created by Len Wein and John Buscema.

The character also appears in Strange Tales #176-177 (October, December 1974), Marvel Two-in-One #11 (September 1975), The Hood #3 (September 2002), #5-6 (November–December 2002), and Nick Fury's Howling Commandos #2 (February 2006).

=== Fictional character biography ===
Golem is a humanoid creature that was made in the 16th century by Judah Loew Ben Bezalel. It was made from purple stone or clay and protected the Jewish people from persecutors in Prague. In later years it was reanimated by Professor Abraham Adamson’s life force as Adamson died.

Golem later became a member of S.H.I.E.L.D.’s Howling Commandos Monster Force.

=== Powers and abilities ===
Golem is 8 ft (2.4 m) tall and has superhuman strength which it draws from the land as long as it is in contact with the Earth.

== Invaders ally ==
Golem
- The Golem makes his first cover appearance. From The Invaders #13

Publication information
- Publisher: Marvel Comics
- First appearance: Invaders #12 (January, 1977)
- Created by: Roy Thomas, Frank Robbins and Frank Springer

In-story information
- Alter ego: Jacob Goldstein
- Team affiliations: Invaders
- Abilities: Super strength Invulnerability

=== Publication history ===
This character first appeared in Invaders #12 (January 1977) as Goldstein, and was created by Roy Thomas, Frank Robbins and Frank Springer; he appeared in Invaders #13 (February 1977) as Golem.

The character subsequently appears in The Invaders #2-4 (June–August 1993).

=== Fictional character biography ===
Jacob Goldstein, the brother of the Blue Bullet, was a resident of the Jewish Warsaw Ghetto in Poland during World War II. He mystically transformed himself into a Golem to combat the Nazis. He assisted the Invaders when his brother was kidnapped by Doctor Death.

=== Powers and abilities ===
In Golem form, Jacob was a hulky humanoid of 3 m (9.8 ft) in height. His skin was hard as stone, giving him a good degree of invulnerability. His strength was greater than Captain America's but less than Namor's.

== Hood foe ==
Golem

Publication information
- Publisher: Marvel Comics
- First appearance: Hood #2 (August 2002)
- Created by: Eric Powell, Kyle Hotz and Brian K. Vaughan

In-story information
- Alter ego: Dennis Golembuski
- Team affiliations: Kingpin

Dennis Golembuski was the grandson of a Polish freedom fighter who immigrated to America. Dennis may or may not have killed a man at the age of eight. He spent some time working as an underboss for Kingpin, but he quit. He began to work for a mysterious new master.

Later he had Mosh brought to him for robbing a liquor store under his "protection". Mosh refused to hand over a percentage of his take from the robbery. So Golem and his assistant Madame Rapier kill Mosh. He recruited the Constrictor, Shocker and Jack O'Lantern to help protect a batch of "bloodstones". After the Hood arrived and stole half the diamonds, he gave Madam Rapier a list of pawn shops for them to scout, in case Hood tried to sell them. Hood arrived at the Golem's office and asking for a cut of the diamonds if he returned the rest undamaged. Golem agreed, but after the Hood left, told Rapier to kill the thief at their rendezvous.

After the Hood double-crossed Rapier, knowing she planned to double-cross him, she was killed in a hail of police gunfire. The Hood confronted Jack O'Lantern and the other super villains. He handed the diamonds over to them, telling them to tell Golem to just leave him alone. After they reported back to him, he promised that nothing was ended between him and the Hood.

=== Powers and abilities ===
Dennis apparently possesses no powers beyond those of a normal man his age.

== Other Golems ==
- Joseph, a resident of Yancy Street, was known as Golem. Joseph was brought over to the United States from the old country by Loew, the creator of the original Golem. Joseph was buried under a building as persecutors dropped away and unearthed decades later with the building's destruction. He began mimicking the protective/defensive actions of the Yancy Street Gang against outsiders but was confronted by the Thing. He was then sent to sleep in the East River by Grimm. Golem first appeared in Marvel Knights 4 #22 (November, 2005). He was created by Roberto Aguirre-Sacasa (writer) and Valentine De Landro (artist).
- In Warheads #2, a being known as Golem briefly possessed Leona MacBride and then Mr. Grant.
- A member of the Vampire Hunters is Inspector Judiah Golem. He first appeared in Tomb of Dracula vol. 3 #4.
- Agents of Cagliostro were known as the Golems. They first appeared in Dr. Strange Annual #2.

== Reception ==
The Golem was ranked #26 on a listing of Marvel Comics' monster characters in 2015.

== Bibliography ==
- Incredible Hulk vol. 2 #134
- Marvel Handbook: The 1970
- Marvel Two-In-One #11
- Nick Fury's Howling Commandos #1-6
- Strange Tales #174, 176-177
