= Batman Eternal =

Comics series

- Cover of Batman Eternal #1 (April 2014) by Jason Fabok

Publication information
- Publisher: DC Comics
- Schedule: Weekly
- Format: Limited series
- Genre: Superhero
- Publication date: April 2014 – April 2015
- No. of issues: 52
- Main characters: Batman; Batman family; James Gordon; Jason Bard; Carmine Falcone; Hush

Creative team
- Written by: Issues 1–21: Scott Snyder, James Tynion IV, John Layman, Ray Fawkes, Tim Seeley; Issues 22–52: Scott Snyder, James Tynion IV, Ray Fawkes, Kyle Higgins, Tim Seeley
- Artists: Multiple: Issues 1–3, 14, 21, 32–34: Jason Fabok; Issues 4, 15–17, 23: Dustin Nguyen, Derek Fridolfs; Issues 5, 18, 24: Andy Clarke; Issue 6: Trevor McCarthy; Issues 7, 19–20: Emanuel Simeoni; Issues 8–9: Guillem March; Issue 10: Riccardo Burchielli; Issue 11: Ian Bertram; Issue 12: Mikel Janin; Issue 13: Mikel Janin, Guillermo Ortego; Issue 22: Jorge Lucas; Issues 25–26: R. M. Guéra; Issue 27: Javier Garron; Issue 28: Meghan Hetrick; Issue 29: Simon Coleby; Issues 30–31: Fernando Pasarin, Matt Ryan; Issues 35–36, 48–49: Fernando Blanco; Issues 37–38: Andrea Mutti; Issue 39: Ramon Perez; Issue 40: Juan José Ryp; Issues 41–42: Joe Quinones; Issue 43: David Lafuente; Issue 44: Aco; Issue 45: Javi Fernandez; Issue 46: Alessandro Vitti; Issue 47: Juan Ferreyra; Issues 50–51: Alvaro Martinez, Raul Fernandez; Issue 52: Paulo Siqueira, others

Batman Eternal is a year-long weekly limited series published by DC Comics, that began in April 2014. The series featured Batman, his allies, and Gotham City, with a writing team led by Scott Snyder, James Tynion IV, Ray Fawkes, Kyle Higgins, and Tim Seeley. John Layman was initially involved but departed after the tenth issue, being replaced by Higgins. The series ran through April 2015, after which it took a hiatus before returning in October 2015 for a 26-issue weekly sequel series titled Batman and Robin Eternal, celebrating the 75th anniversary of Robin. The success of the series led to spin-off series like Arkham Manor and Gotham by Midnight, both of which emerged from events within the main series of Batman Eternal.

The story begins with a major incident that reshapes Gotham City, exploring various subplots and characters, including the Bat Family, James Gordon, and several villains. The narrative is divided into different arcs, each showcasing the unique styles of the contributing writers. Notable plot points include the transformation of Wayne Manor into Arkham Manor and the rise of new threats in Gotham.

The series was praised for its engaging plot and strong character development. Critics appreciated the depth and complexity of the story, as well as the way it handled multiple characters and their arcs. However, there were occasional pacing issues, with some parts of the story feeling slow or disjointed. The series consistently ranked among the top-selling comics, with several issues appearing in Diamond Comic Distributors' monthly top ten lists.

== Publication history ==
In October 2013, DC Comics announced the series would launch in early 2014, with Scott Snyder heading the story. Additional writers include James Tynion IV, John Layman, Ray Fawkes, and Tim Seeley, with art at the beginning handled by Jason Fabok. Snyder and Tynion co-wrote the first story arc, which lays the groundwork for the series. The story lines then move to a bigger story that includes Snyder's Batman title, once it finishes the "Zero Year" story line. The series is part of the 75th anniversary celebration of Batman.

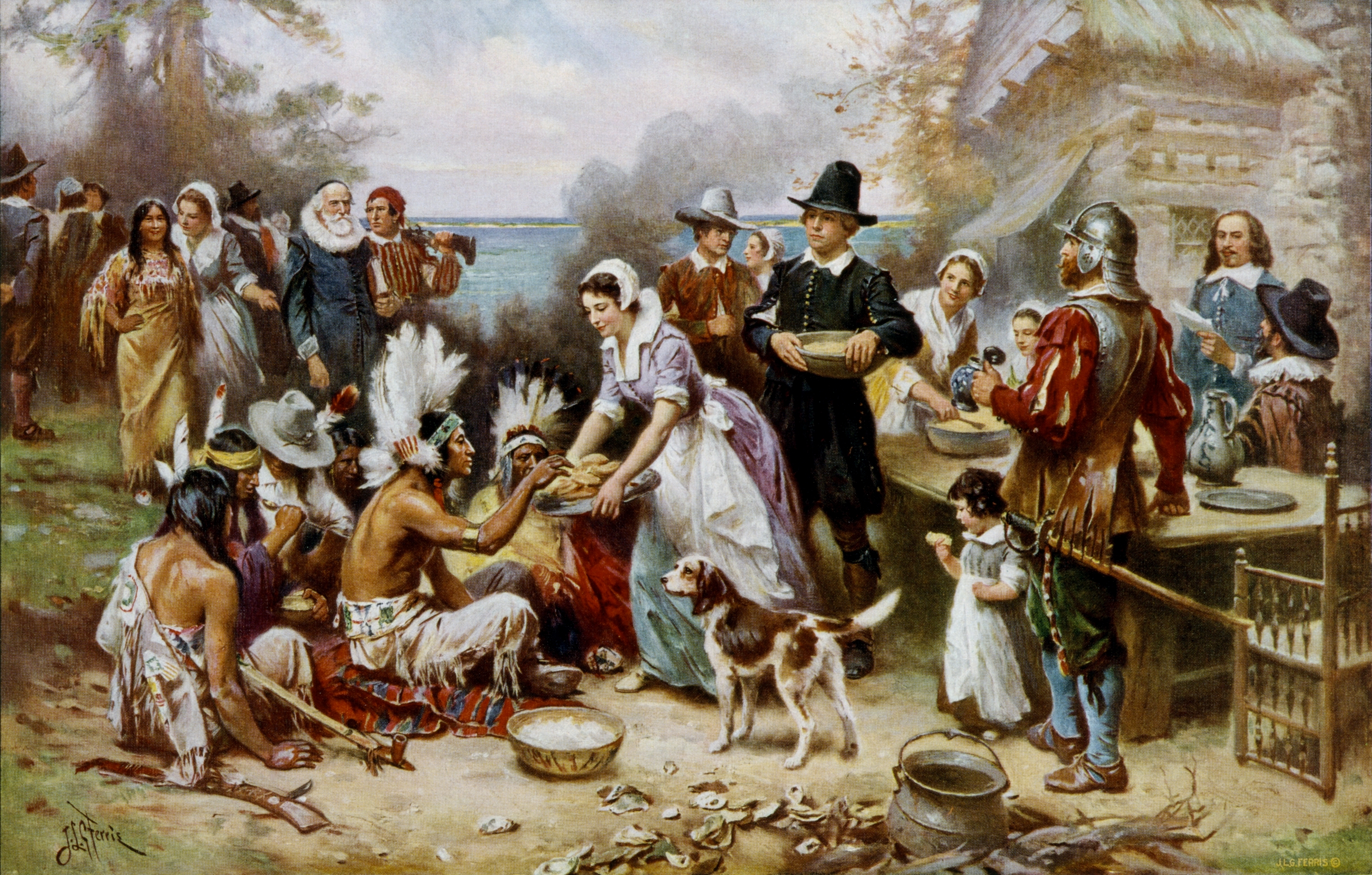
The "Happy Batsgiving" teaser, (top) which was inspired by Jean Leon Gerome Ferris' The First Thanksgiving 1621 (bottom)

In November 2013, Snyder released a teaser image by Fabok, titled "Happy Batsgiving", inspired by Jean Leon Gerome Ferris' The First Thanksgiving 1621. The image was intended to be "full of Easter eggs and teases" for the series. In December 2013, Seeley stated that Snyder and Tynion created the overarching plot threads of the series to keep each writer progressing, but then further broke the whole story down to different genres for each writer to work in. Fawkes also added that each writer takes turns being the "lead" on the issue, while the others continue to contribute their parts to the issue.

In January 2014, Snyder revealed that each writer is writing arcs to the series, opposed to each writer working together on a single issue. Snyder said, "it might be more difficult or tricky to do a series where each one of us is doing an arc that leads to the next arc, but we liked that idea. We liked that challenge." To aid in this, a large document containing the whole story was created to help map out where large moments needed to occur, and how to aid in connecting each writer's arcs. It was also announced in January that the series would launch in April 2014, and that Layman had left the project. Layman's final issue was issue 10, though he still received "contributing writer" credit through issue 21. Later in the month, DC confirmed the addition of Kyle Higgins on the writing team, who wrote The New 52 series Nightwing up to its penultimate issue in March 2014.

The series starts with a three-issue arc that features a glimpse at the series' end, as well as establishing the incident that drastically reshapes Gotham. Then, issues 4–7 set up smaller plots branching out from the overarching story, before shifting into three-issue arcs by the various creative teams. On the arcs, Snyder said, "Each arc reflects the tastes and the real talent of each writer, and yet at the same time it will feel really seamless and singular — like one bombastic game-changing story that rolls forward through these different neighborhoods of writing in an interesting way." Seeley called issue 20 the end of "season one" of Eternal.

In July 2014, Snyder revealed the story arc after "Zero Year" in Batman, "Endgame", would take place after the events of Eternal. He revealed that issue 34 would act as a way to catch readers up to the events of Eternal, without spoiling the conclusion, while also setting up the new story arc that will run from Batman #35-40. Starting in October 2014, along with the "Endgame" storyline, most New 52 titles in the "Batman" family take place at the end of the Eternal storyline ending in April 2015. At the end of October, Snyder confirmed the series would go on hiatus after April 2015, and would return for a second year.

=== Batman (vol. 2) #28 ===
In December 2013, Snyder announced that Batman (vol. 2) #28, originally scheduled to be part of the "Zero Year" story, would instead act as a preview issue to Batman Eternal and the future story line in Batman. The issue was written by Snyder and Tynion, with Dustin Nguyen and Derek Fridolfs providing the artwork. Snyder stated that, if Batman (vol. 2) #28 was an issue of Eternal, it would be issue 39.5, which equates to a year's time from the continuity seen at the end of "Forever Evil" and the start of Eternal, and was done as a way to tease where Eternal would lead in 2014. However, the solicitations for issue #43 indicated that that issue would have close ties to Batman (vol. 2) 28.

The issue introduces a Gotham where the police are no longer allies to Batman and a curfew is being enforced. Harper Row is able to gain access to The Egyptian, the last remaining nightclub in New Gotham, where she reveals to security that her brother is sick in the Narrows at "ground zero" and was hoping to meet the new "kingpin" of Gotham to get help. When security starts to question her reason for being there, she shuts off the lights to allow Batman to enter. Learning where to go next from a mysterious girl in the Batcave, Harper begins to help Batman remove the remaining security teams, working under the name Bluebird. Batman and Bluebird learn that the new "kingpin" is Selina Kyle, who has taken control of the underworld. They request to get something from her safe that will help the people dying in Gotham. At the safe, it is revealed Selina has Stephanie Brown tied up and she is the only one who knows how to stop what is coming next.

== Premise and characters ==
Each of the writers spoke about the different aspects of Batman and Gotham City they would be exploring in their arcs. With the main plot occurring in Snyder's and Tynion's arcs, each writer was able to incorporate different genres and aspects of the Batman universe into their stories:

- Tynion stated he would be focusing on some of the younger members of the Bat Family, including former Robins Tim Drake and Stephanie Brown. Additionally, Tynion will be introducing a larger role for the Gotham Gazette and Vicki Vale, and will examine how their roles as reporters affect Gotham.
- Seeley revealed he would be working within the action, espionage, and adventure genres, with his arc focused on Batgirl and Red Hood.
- Fawkes covers the horror genre and aspect of Gotham, while focusing on Batwing and Jim Corrigan. He also brought back Ten-Eyed Man, Doctor Double X, and Maxie Zeus, among other characters who have not appeared in years, and thought to introduce Julia Pennyworth, which the creative team felt strongly about, they rerouted "everything to make [her place in the story] one of the key parts of the series."
- Layman, before leaving the project, was to focus on "the colorful aspects of Gotham" and the villains. Layman's replacement, Kyle Higgins, will continue this focus while also taking his approach from a cinema background. Higgins also revealed that he would introduce Zachary Gate, also known as The Architect, from his Batman: Gates of Gotham series.

Snyder stated after the release of Batman (vol. 2) #28, that Harper Row "is all over this book" and later said that one of the "spines" of the series is the relationship between Batman and Jim Gordon, putting "them in situations you've never ever seen before where the conflicts and challenges they're up against are different than anything they've experienced on the page." On the characters that will appear in the series, Tynion said, "Gotham is the best toy box in the comics industry, and we're getting to play with all of the toys, even the ones that are sort of in the bottom of the bin that have been forgotten about."

Tynion later added that Dick Grayson would not appear in his series, due to the Bat Family believing he is dead from the events of Forever Evil and the character appearing in his new role as a superspy in the series Grayson. However, the effect of the Bat Family thinking Nightwing is dead and not knowing where he is will be explored. At the 2014 Chicago Comic & Entertainment Expo, Tynion revealed that the creative team almost included Renee Montoya, who had yet to appear in The New 52, but they decided against it, saying, "We cut her out because we didn't want her to just be in the background of the GCPD. We want to bring her back for her own big story."

Additional characters that saw their New 52 debut in the series, played a significant role overall or within an individual writer's arc, or were included in the "Batsgiving" teaser, include: Batwoman, Jason Bard, Harvey Bullock, Catwoman, Deacon Blackfire, Carmine Falcone, Jack Forbes, Hush, Joker's Daughter, Killer Croc, the Penguin, Alfred Pennyworth, Professor Pyg, Road Runner, Maggie Sawyer, and Tiger Shark.

== Plot ==
In the near future, Batman is seen tied to the Bat-Signal while Gotham City burns around him. In the present, Commissioner Gordon fights Professor Pyg before being joined by Batman. The two give chase to Pyg, with Gordon cornering one of his henchmen and ordering him to lower his weapon. The henchman states he does not have one. Gordon fires, but the bullet hits a transformer and causes a massive explosion and makes two trains collide. The Gotham City Police Department and Jason Bard, who had just arrived in Gotham, arrest Gordon, who is denied bail for his crimes and assigned to Blackgate Penitentiary until his trial. Batman reviews the footage of the accident and learns that the henchman worked for Carmine Falcone, who has been talking to Sebastian Hady about returning Gotham to the time before the rise of Batman. Meanwhile, Falcone's men attack on Penguin's weapons caches. This makes Penguin prepare to go to war. Hady, under the guidance of Falcone, promotes Major Jack Forbes to interim commissioner of the GCPD, who shifts the department's priority to stopping Batman.

Doctor Phosphorus destroys Pyg's lab, while Catwoman visits Penguin at the Iceberg Lounge to learn about disappearances in the Gotham Underground. Suddenly Falcone, Tiger Shark and Road Runner begin an attack on the casino. Catwoman saves Penguin and bystanders before the Lounge sinks to the bottom of Gotham Harbor. Meanwhile, Pyg destroys Road Runner's car dealership, believing he was connected to destroying the lab. Batman apprehends multiple of Falcone's thugs throughout the night for the GCPD. He then meets Forbes and Bard at the Bat–Signal, hoping to form an alliance similar to the one he had with Gordon. When Forbes threatens to shoot, Bard orders the SWAT members to fire their smoke grenades, allowing Batman to escape. To learn more about Falcone's past, Batman heads to Hong Kong, where is aided by the Batman of Japan. While there, Shen Fang reveals to having been bought out by Falcone to end the gang war in Hong Kong to return to Gotham. Batman returns home with Julia Pennyworth, who was injured while fighting Fang. In Gotham, Catwoman is captured by Falcone after attempting a heist. While Alfred helps nurse Julia back to health at Wayne Manor, Pyg takes Falcone and Catwoman hostage, hoping to turn Falcone into one of his henchmen for blowing up his lab, though Batman is able to stop him and rescue Catwoman.

With no end to the gang war in sight, Bard approaches Harvey Bullock, Maggie Sawyer, Vicki Vale and Batman with an idea on how to stop it: lead an assault on Falcone's men to capture them, and wire tap Forbes to learn more about his role in the fight. Elsewhere, Gordon begins his trial and learns that his son, James Gordon Jr., is alive. Penguin arrives at Falcone's hideout to finish him, only for both to be arrested by Bard and sent to Blackgate. Once inside Blackgate, a fight between Falcone's and Penguin's men ignites a riot and takeover in the prison. Gordon sets out to save the guards and receives help from his cellmate, former crime boss Rex Calabrese. With Bard and Batman working together now, the two witness someone head underground in the Narrows and go to investigate. They are eventually joined by Killer Croc, where they encounter Ten-Eyed Man and a captured victim. Batman, Croc and Bard save the victim and defeat the villain, as the underground caves-in on him.

Batgirl uses the Batcomputer to recreate the train station surveillance and notices a man connected with the trains' collision. She identifies him as a Brazilian soap opera star with drug cartel connections, and heads to South America to find him. She is quickly confronted by Scorpiana. With the aid of Red Hood, Starfire, and El Gaucho, she defeats Scorpiana and learns that the man she is looking for is an impersonator. Searching for the actual person, Red Hood, Batgirl and Batwoman reach a toy factory in Rio de Janeiro and find Dr. Falsario. His mind altering technology makes Batgirl temporarily attack Red Hood and Batwoman, who she sees as the Joker and James Jr., respectively. The heroes eventually subdue Falsario and learn that he supplied his devises to have Gordon see a gun. Falsario escapes to the rain forest, where he is killed by an unknown assassin.

During the gang war, Stephanie Brown overhears her father talking with other villains about rising to power in Gotham. Her dad attempts to kill her, but she narrowly escapes. Stephanie heads to the library and begins to post articles alerting the public to her father and his comrades' villainous deeds. She also researches the history of her father and how he became Cluemaster. To draw her out, Cluemaster sends a bomb to one of Stephanie Brown's friend's house, setting it ablaze. She creates the Spoiler costume to go after her father and other bad guys.

Red Robin investigates the infected children who were present during Pyg's fight with Gordon. He learns the infection was caused by nanobots and originated from a single building in the Narrows. While investigating, he accidentally activates the nanobots in a child. Elsewhere, Vicki Vale follows a lead on potential gang wars in the Narrows, and, upon confronting them, is saved by Harper Row. The gang members follow Harper and Vale back to Harper's apartment, which is below Red Robin, who falls through the floor fighting the nanobots. The nanobots attack the gang members before Red Robin is able to stop them. Harper's brother Cullen, who was also infected, has the nanobots enter his body. Red Robin heads to Tokyo to find Sergei, one of Bruce's teachers, and learns that Harper has stowed away on his plane. The duo shows Sergei the nanobot design, which turns out to resemble a design that was stolen from him. Red Robin also begins to consider training Harper.

Batman sends Batwing to assist Jim Corrigan at Arkham Asylum to investigate a magical disturbance, while Joker's Daughter prepares a summoning ritual below Arkham, using its inmates that have the "dark dream". Corrigan and Batwing enter Arkham only to be attacked, with Batwing captured by Joker's Daughter. Batwing is able to escape and meets back up with Corrigan to discover that a resurrected Deacon Blackfire is the cause of the Arkham disturbance, who is able to unleash his attack on Gotham.

When word is released that Gordon is receiving a life sentence for his murders, Bard becomes the new police commissioner and arranges Falcone to be released from Blackgate. Batman meets with Falcone and accuses him of framing Gordon, as the knife that killed Dr. Falsario belongs to the crime lords of Hong Kong. Falcone denies the accusations. Batman later gives Bard evidence that can clear Gordon. At Wayne Manor, Hush injects Alfred with fear toxin. Bard goes to Blackgate, retrieves Falcone and releases Zachary Gate, giving him his Architect costume. Bard tells Hush the evidence clearing Gordon was destroyed, the Architect is free and Batman does not suspect anything. The Architect starts destroying the Beacon Tower. Julia Pennyworth enters the Batcave, contacts Batman, tells him about Alfred's condition and assists him in rescuing the hostages held in the Tower. Batman confronts the Architect, who helps him realize that Hush has been one of the masterminds since the beginning.

Hush has been manipulating the city, both overtly, through the gang war between Carmine Falcone and the Penguin and the Architect's attack on Beacon Tower; and covertly, using the Cluemaster to trigger rolling blackouts, infesting the city with rats and strangling the road network with traffic jams. All of this brings tensions to a head so that when Hush has Jason Bard leak a story about an imminent terrorist attack to the Gotham Gazette, rioting breaks out, forcing Bard to introduce a state of martial law.

With the help of Jade, a girl living on the streets under the protection of Killer Croc, Selina Kyle enters Blackgate Prison to meet with her father, Rex Calabrese. Calabrese suggests that she alone can end the gang war by showing herself to be his daughter, but Selina refuses. When Jade is taken by child services and placed with her only living relatives, a group of Romanian mobsters, Selina makes it her mission to rescue her. The Romanians use Jade to lure her into a trap, capturing her and intending to beat and torture her to death in front of a paying crowd. Selina escapes when Killer Croc arrives, looking for Jade, but is horrified when a bullet aimed at her kills Jade instead. She returns to Calabrese who repeats his suggestion that Selina could end the gang war, and she takes up the cause.

Meanwhile, Hush—as Thomas Elliott—has Alfred moved to Arkham Asylum, which remains under the control of the inmates. Although Deacon Blackfire's plan to open Gotham up to the influence of hell has been thwarted, he still retains corporeal form and is able to overpower Jim Corrigan. Having been separated previously, Batwing reawakens and tries to rescue Corrigan, only to witness the Spectre emerging and stopping Blackfire. However, this causes the caves under Arkham Asylum to collapse, destroying the facility and allowing a mass break-out of the inmates. Alfred is among the survivors and joins with Bane in trying to locate other survivors. Alfred leads him to a satellite Batcave and uses its defence systems to knock him out.

While Batman tries to track down the Arkham escapees, Hush has Jason Bard deploy soldiers to specific locations around the city. While on a routine patrol, an explosion destroys a police convoy, killing several police officers. The explosion is revealed to have been a Wayne Enterprises weapons cache, one of seventeen placed around the city to assist Batman Incorporated. Batman joins Julia Pennyworth in rendering each cache safe by activating its failsafe, destroying its contents. He finally confronts Hush in the final cache, and the two fight. Although Batman prevails, Hush directs his attention to a news broadcast in which Lucius Fox announces that in light of the explosion, the federal government has seized upon Wayne Enterprises' assets, effectively rendering Bruce Wayne bankrupt.

With Hush in custody, order is temporarily restored until Jason Bard tries to capture Batman with seized Wayne Enterprises assets, leading Batman to believe that Hush was simply another pawn in a wider scheme. He starts searching for the mastermind, first tracking down the Riddler and later Ra's al Ghul—the only people he believes who have the ability carry out such a sophisticated plan—only for both of them to convince him of their innocence, arguing that they could easily destroy a weakened Batman, but that they must vanquish him at the height of his powers in order to prove their power over him.

Meanwhile, Red Robin enlists Harper Row's aid in locating the source of the nanomachine infestation sweeping the city. They identify Jervis Tetch as the source, and Harper—adopting the name "Bluebird"—is forced into the field when Red Robin, Batgirl and Red Hood are all overwhelmed by the nanomachines. Harper tricks Tetch into giving up the device that controls the nanomachines, shutting down the infestation. They realise that a variant of Tetch's mind-control technology was used to manipulate Jim Gordon into firing the shots that triggered the subway accident.

Following the collapse of Arkham Asylum, several high-value inmates remain at large. After regrouping and arguing over their leadership, they find an anonymous backer has supplied them with unlimited resources, enabling them to unleash havoc on the city at will. Selina Kyle is made the same offer, but turns it down and instead focuses on finding Stephanie Brown, who is still on the run from assassins. Selina locates her quickly and turns her over to Batman. Stephanie refuses to talk, believing that Bruce Wayne is responsible for backing the criminal activity that has taken hold in Gotham. As each of Batman's allies heads off to thwart the individual criminals, the Penguin starts a riot at Blackgate Penitentiary to try and kill James Gordon. Gordon is saved by Harvey Bullock and Jason Bard, who has had a change of heart. They escape the prison to find Gotham on fire following an attack by Firefly.

Batman initially prepares to engage Firefly, but realises that it is a distraction. He moves to Beacon Tower and is confronted by the real mastermind of the plan: Arthur Brown. He is the Cluemaster, a costumed villain largely regarded as a third-rate criminal. Brown reveals that his entire plan hinged on Batman believing his own legend—that if his enemies appeared to be co-ordinated, then he would always look for the bigger threat behind it all, never considering a small-time criminal like Brown as the mastermind. Brown prepares to kill Batman, but is himself killed by his silent partner, Lincoln March; also known as the Talon. On the Night of the Owls, Brown approached the Court of Owls with his plan to ruin Batman, only to find that they have been slaughtered by March, who agrees to support his plan.

March and a physically and mentally exhausted Batman fight as Jim Gordon rallies the people of Gotham to rise up and support him. The entire Batman family converges on Beacon Tower to apprehend March, but he escapes through the sewers. In the aftermath, Bard resigns as commissioner with his career in ruins, while Stephanie Brown moves in with Harper Row and her brother Cullen. Meanwhile, the Court of Owls gets its revenge by catching March and putting him into an induced hypothermic coma. In the epilogue, Batman meets with Gordon, who reveals that Scarecrow has launched another attack on the city. Batman asks if he is ready for one more fight; Gordon replies that he is willing to find out.

== Reception ==
According to Comicbook Roundup, the entire series received an average rating of 7.2 out of 10 based on 709 reviews. In February 2014, Batman Eternal, along with DC's second weekly title launching in 2014, The New 52: Futures End, were featured on IGN's "Most Anticipated Comics of 2014".

The first issue received positive reviews. Comic Book Resources' Jim Johnson gave the issue 4.5 stars out of 5, saying the issue "is a tremendous start, not just for a weekly series, but for any comic series." Michael Moccio of Newsarama added, "From beginning to end of this issue, you won't want to stop turning the pages and, at the final page, you'll be on the edge of your seat anticipating the next issue", giving it an 8 out of 10. Despite some "clunky dialogue" at the start of Batman Eternal #1, Mike Logsdon of IGN gave the issue an 8.6 out of 10, due to its "cinematically-scaled layouts, strong themes, an interesting use of a new character, and an intriguing new mystery."

John Layman's first issue in the series, Batman Eternal #4, was met with generally positive reviews. Logsdon gave the issue a 9.0 out of 10, saying, beyond a few art distractions, it was "the strongest issue of this series so far." Newsarama's Pierce Lydon added that, despite "another solid installation in this weekly series... the plot is starting to spin its wheels. We are less than 10% through this series, but we're not seeing enough effective payoff yet. The World's Greatest Detective is really taking his time doing any detecting", giving the issue a 6 out of 10. Jennifer Cheng of Comic Book Resources said the issue felt "like a well put-together TV show, and not just in its faster week-to-week pacing. There are many interlocking parts to the plot, and each part holds its own," awarding the issue 3.5 stars out of 5.

Issue #5, James Tynion IV's first issue, continued the generally positive trend, receiving 4 stars out of 5 from Comic Book Resources' Greg McElhatton. He said, "A weekly series needs to have three to four times as much plot as a monthly book, in order to keep from feeling padded. With this issue, we're starting to enter the outskirts of "epic" levels of plot, and that's a relief. Tynion takes on the scripting for this issue and it flows well, introducing the new elements without feeling like we've been left hanging for what's come before." Logsdon gave the issue a 7.8 out of 10, saying "It seems that this weekly series might be presenting us with a series of one-shots that tie into the larger story. If this really is the start of a trend, so far it has been quite successful. James Tynion IV takes on scripting duties and he does a good job of capturing Tim Drake's new personality." Lydon, however, said, "I'm always partial stories that take into account more than just the police and capes side of a story and Tynion taps Vicki Vale for a starring role as well. But we're still just moving pawns in this game of chess, and the strategy has been yet to be fully realized," giving the issue a 5 out of 10.

Batman Eternal #6, the first for Ray Fawkes, had more mixed reviews. IGN's Jeff Lake said the series "is starting to feel a bit like Game of Thrones. Each week offers a snapshot view of a few characters, only to switch to a different set the following week. Issue #6 is a Batwing issue, and while it's fun to see him working alongside Jim Corrigan (and facing the always awesome Gentleman Ghost), it's hard to see how it fits into the main story," awarding the issue a 7.8 out of 10. Lydon expressed similar sentiments, giving the issue a 6 out of 10 and adding, "We're still firmly in building mode but we're starting to lose sight of the inciting incident. Gordon's mishap and the return of the Roman feel like they happened so long ago because we've seen an attempt to weave so many other storylines in."

Logsdon gave issue #7, Tim Seeley's first, an 8.0 out of 10, feeling Seeley gave each of the characters he dealt with the proper spotlight. Marykate Jasper of Comic Book Resources gave the issue 4 stars out of 5, saying the issue was "an explosion-packed, game-changing issue that keeps up the pace of its predecessors and continues to expand the scope of the story." Lydon also spoke positively, giving the issue an 8 out of 10, and saying, "The chains are really starting to move in Eternal... [and the series] is changing the landscape of Gotham quite literally, and it's exciting to watch."

Issue #22, Kyle Higgins' first issue, received a 5 out of 10 from Lydon. He said, "Kyle Higgins' scripting serves really only to get us to the ending and have the Architect reveal his motivations a bit... This chapter almost feels extraneous, but it's not the worst this title has been." McElhatton gave the issue 2.5 stars out of 5, saying, "The problem with Batman Eternal #22 is that this recent shift, bringing the Architect and Hush back into continuity, hasn't had time to settle in with everything else around it. Dealing with the crime war or the strangeness under Arkham Asylum, bringing the characters in feels out of place, almost like an entirely different comic. While the connection is there, it's still such a thin line that for the moment it's hard to adjust to a proverbial jumping of the tracks into something else. The tone is different, the characters we've been reading about are suddenly all absent, and this just doesn't quite work."

Batman (vol. 2) #28

Comic Book Resources' Doug Zawisza gave Batman (vol. 2) #28 4.5 stars out of 5, saying he was "onboard and locked in to see how Snyder and crew weave the not-so-distant past with the near future... [and the] issue is a nice break from "Zero Year," a change of pace, a switch in visual impact, a breath of fresh air and a sign of hope for the Gotham of tomorrow as Snyder continues to construct and deepen the legend of Gotham City and its role in the mythology of Batman." David Pepose of Newsarama gave the issue an 8 out 10. He said, "With this preview to the upcoming Bat-event Batman Eternal, the creative team adds just enough to Gotham's mythology to hold your interest." IGN's Melissa Grey gave the issue an 8 out of 10 as well, calling it "a fun issue," but one that "doesn't comfortably ground the reader in its timeline."

== Sales ==
For April 2014, Diamond Comic Distributors announced that Batman Eternal issues #1–4 were the fourth, sixth, ninth and 10th best selling titles of the month, respectively. Batman Eternal #5–8 ranked 10th, 11th, 17th and 15th, respectively for May 2014. In June 2014, Batman Eternal #9-12 ranked 14th through 17th, respectively. For July 2014, Eternal #13-17 ranked 17th, 18th, 22nd, 23rd and 25th, respectively. Eternal #18 in August 2014 ranked 10th, while issues #19-21 ranked 14th-16th, respectively. In September 2014, Batman Eternal #22-25 ranked 31st, 34th, 35th and 37th, respectively. In October 2014, issues #26-30 ranked 29th, 32nd, 39th and 38th, respectively. The final issue, #52, reached the rank of 39th.

== Collected editions ==
Title	Contents	Publication date	ISBN
Batman Eternal Vol. 1	Batman Eternal #1–21	December 2014	978-1401251734
Batman Eternal Vol. 2	Batman Eternal #22–34	July 2015	978-1401252311
Batman Eternal Vol. 3	Batman Eternal #35–52, Batman (vol. 2) #28	October 2015	978-1401257521
Batman Eternal Omnibus	Batman Eternal #1-52, Batman (vol. 2) #28	September 2019	978-1401294175

== Spinoff series ==
In June 2014, DC announced a new title within the "Batman" family of New 52 titles, Arkham Manor, written by Gerry Duggan, with art by Shawn Crystal for release in October 2014. In August, they also announced Gotham by Midnight for release in November 2014, written by Ray Fawkes and art by Ben Templesmith. Both spin out of the events of Eternal, with Arkham Manor focusing on Wayne Manor becoming the new Arkham Asylum, and Gotham By Midnight exploring Corrigan and "The Midnight Shift" of the Gotham Police Department that handle supernatural occurrences. Arkham Manor takes place after the events of Eternal #30, with Gotham by Midnight occurring at the end of the Eternal storyline ending in March 2015.

== Sequel ==
At the 2015 San Diego Comic-Con, DC announced a followup series, Batman and Robin Eternal. It features Tynion as the lead writer, along with Snyder, Seeley, Genevieve Valentine, Steve Orlando, Jackson Lanzing, Collin Kelly and Ed BrissonIt, with art from Tony Daniel, Paul Pelletier and Scot Eaton. Batman and Robin Eternal was set to begin in October 2015 until April 2016, running weekly for 26 issues, and is intended to celebrate the 75th anniversary of the Robin character, just as Batman Eternal celebrated the 75th anniversary of the Batman character. Tynion stated, "Part of it will be Dick Grayson as Robin in the past alongside Batman. This is Dick's first international mysteries, he thought it was the most harrowing case of his life but he didn't know who he was up against. He's going to stumble into a mystery that shakes the foundation of the concept of Robin. This is the series where we will bring back Cassandra Cain to the DC Universe. She's been one of my favorite characters, I came up in the era when she was front and center. Bringing her into continuity in this story in particular -- the three leads in this story are Dick Grayson and Harper Row and Cassandra Cain. It's going to take us all over the world and bring in all of the Robins. The whole Bat family."
