= Master Man (Marvel Comics) =

- Master Man as depicted in The Invaders #16 (May 1977). Art by Jack Kirby.

Publication information
- Publisher: Marvel Comics
- First appearance: Wilhelm: Giant-Size The Invaders #1 (June 1975); Nacht: Namor the Sub-Mariner #11 (Feb. 1991); Max: Captain America #18 (July 2006)
- Created by: Wilhelm: Roy Thomas; Frank Robbins; Nacht: John Byrne; Max: Ed Brubaker; Steve Epting

In-story information
- Alter ego: Wilhelm Lohmer; Axl Nacht; Max Lohmer
- Species: Human mutate
- Team affiliations: Super-Axis
- Abilities: Superhuman strength, speed, stamina and durability Flight

Master Man is the name of three different supervillains that appear in American comic books published by Marvel Comics.

== Publication history ==
The original Master Man (Wilhelm Lohmer) first appears in the title Giant-Size The Invaders #1 (June 1975) and was created by Roy Thomas and Frank Robbins.

The second version (Axl Nacht), first appears in Namor the Sub-Mariner #11 (Feb. 1991) and was created by John Byrne.

The third version (Max Lohmer) debuts in Captain America #18 (July 2006) and was created by Ed Brubaker and Steve Epting.

== Fictional character biography ==
=== Wilhelm Lohmer ===
Wilhelm "Willie" Lohmer first appears in the title Giant-Size Invaders. Originally a physically frail American Bundist and Nazi sympathiser, Lohmer agrees to participate in an experiment in which he is subjected to the Nazi version of the Super-Soldier Serum. Endowed with physical abilities exceeding those of Captain America, Lohmer is given a costume and the alias Master Man, intended to be the first of a new Aryan "master race". As Master Man, Lohmer battles the Allied superheroes the Invaders, but is defeated when his new abilities prove to be temporary.

Master Man reappears in a two-part story in the title Marvel Two-in-One, and with Nazi allies Brain Drain, U-Man, and Skyshark plans to sabotage New York City with a new super weapon. The plan is foiled by time-traveling Fantastic Four member the Thing and the Liberty Legion.

A revitalised Master Man, now possessing even greater abilities, ambushes the Invaders while they are flying over Europe. During the course of a multi-issue storyline involving the Invaders' incarceration and eventual escape from a prison in Berlin, Master Man meets Julia Koenig, who courtesy of an accident gains abilities similar to his own and becomes the Nazi heroine Warrior Woman. At the insistence of Adolf Hitler, leader of the Third Reich, the two are to be married, his logic being that they are the progenitors of a new race. The ceremony is interrupted when the priest is killed by rubble from a building damaged during a battle between the Invaders and German troops. Master Man and Warrior Woman retreat when confronted by the Human Torch, who becomes enraged when his ward Toro is wounded by gunfire.

Master Man continues to be a perennial foe for the Invaders, battling the team while disguised as the hero the Destroyer and as part of Super-Axis, a team formed by the Japanese spy Lady Lotus.

Willie Lohmer reappears in the title Cable, now an old man living in Switzerland and wishing to make amends for his past actions. He dies shielding Cable from a bullet fired by a member of the Hellfire Club.

=== Axl Nacht ===
Near the end of World War II, Baron Strucker placed Master Man and Warrior Woman in suspended animation in a hidden laboratory, thereby "preserving" the Nazi dream for use at a later time. Master Man is revived by scientist Axl Nacht, and at Nacht's direction, abducts the original Human Torch and Ann Raymond (Toro's widow) – their blood being necessary to help revive Warrior Woman, who had suffered brain damage. Nacht betrays Master Man when it is revealed that his father first cared for the two superbeings while in suspended animation, and unknowingly instilled in the younger Nacht an obsession with Warrior Woman. When Namor, former founding member of the Invaders, finds the laboratory, he battles Master Man until he loses his powers. Nacht steals Master Man's abilities for himself, and has apparently also won the affections of the revived but unstable Warrior Woman. Namor rescues the prisoners as Lohmer destroys the laboratory, although no bodies are found in the wreckage.

=== Max Lohmer ===
The grandnephew of Lohmer, Max Lohmer, appears in the fifth volume of Captain America. Lohmer leads a gang of Neo-Nazis called the Master Men, who are empowered with a weaker version of the Super-Soldier Serum by Red Skull. The gang embark on a rampage in London until they are defeated by Captain America and heroes Union Jack and Spitfire.

== Powers and abilities ==
Wilhelm Lohmer was a frail human until exposed to the Nazi variation of Abraham Erskine's Super-Soldier Serum, and receives enhanced physical abilities. The Nazi version of the process is amplified and as a result Lohmer receives greater abilities than those of Captain America, including superior strength, stamina, durability, speed, and flight. The serum, however, was unstable and at times Lohmer would revert to his normal self.

== Other versions ==
In the "Heroes Reborn" universe, a version of Master Man named Alexander appears as a Neo-Nazi and ally of the Red Skull. This version of Master Man later develops the delusion that he is the Christian God and forms a cult of gamma-powered minions who enslave the population of California.
