= Blue Bullet =

Jonathan Goldstein Blue Bullet

Publication information
- Publisher: Marvel Comics
- First appearance: Invaders #11 (December 1976)
- Created by: Roy Thomas and Frank Robbins

In-story information
- Alter ego: Jonathan Goldstein
- Species: Human
- Notable aliases: Blue Bullet

Blue Bullet (Johann Goldstein) is a character appearing in American comic books published by Marvel Comics. Created by writer Roy Thomas and artist Frank Robbins, the character first appeared in Invaders #11 (December 1976).

== Development ==
=== Concept and creation ===
Blue Bullet was created as an homage to the Fawcett comics character Bullet Man.

=== Publication history ===
Blue Bullet debuted in Invaders #11-12 (December 1976–January 1977), created by Roy Thomas and Frank Robbins. The character subsequently appeared in Captain America (vol. 1) #253 (January 1981), and in The Invaders #4 (August 1993), in which he dies.

== Fictional character biography ==
Johann Goldstein was a Polish Jew who studied science in the 1930s, with his older brother Jacob. When the German army invaded Poland in 1939 and began to persecute the Jews, Johann fled to the USA while his brother remained in Poland. He changed his name to Professor Jonathan Gold and began working on a secret project. He designed a suit of steel armor that was capable of flight. When the Nazis learned of his project in 1943, they captured his brother Jacob and ordered John to betray the USA and kill the Invaders in exchange for Jacob's life.

As the Blue Bullet, John fought the Invaders but was defeated. When John told them what happened, they journeyed to Warsaw to free Jacob. The German army prevented the Invaders from taking Jacob away by firing at a group of Jews, obliging the Invaders to surrender. Using some ancient books of the Cabala, Jacob transformed into the Golem and freed the Invaders.

Later, Doctor Death (formerly known as Doctor Nemesis) kidnapped John to employ him in his Project Mojave, and Jacob was obliged to obey his orders in exchange for John's life. This time, the Golem was forced to attack the Invaders in Doctor Death's plan to force the USA out of involvement in World War II. When the Invaders attacked Doctor Death's base, the Golem remained neutral to keep from putting his brother in danger. John escaped during the battle, but was shot and killed by Sky Shark.

== Powers and abilities ==
Johann Goldstein is a scientific genius who worked on several secret government projects over the years, including the Blue Bullet and an oscillotron. The Blue Bullet is a one-person armored vehicle equipped with powerful engines on its back and feet. It is described as a human rocket and is capable of flying at extremely high speeds. The Blue Bullet can easily tear through walls, and its armor protects Goldstein from gunfire and attacks by superhuman beings such as the Sub-Mariner.
