= Union Jack (Joseph Chapman) =

- Joseph "Joe" Chapman as Union Jack, as appeared on the cover of Union Jack #2 (October 2006). Art by Mike Perkins.

Publication information
- Publisher: Marvel Comics
- First appearance: Captain America #253 (January 1981); The Union #1 (December 2021)
- Created by: Roger Stern; John Byrne

In-story information
- Alter ego: Joseph "Joe" Chapman
- Species: Human mutate
- Team affiliations: Knights of Pendragon; New Invaders; MI5; Invaders; MI-13; The Union (Note: Union Jack is the current leader of The Union.)
- Abilities: Skilled athlete Peak physical condition Use of handguns and a steel dagger As a Pendragon: Mystically enhanced strength, speed and endurance Superhuman acuity sense Superhuman strength via magical/cybernetic exoskeleton armor Carries a 6' striking staff Rides a computerized motorcycle-like vehicle Ability to sense the presence of agents of the Bane

Union Jack (Joseph "Joey" Chapman) is a character appearing in American comic books published by Marvel Comics. He is the third person to take on the role of Union Jack. He first appeared in Captain America #253 (January, 1981).

== Publication history ==
=== 1980s publications ===
Roger Stern and John Byrne introduced Chapman in Captain America #253 (January 1981); in the story he visits his friend Kenneth Crichton, grandson of original Union Jack Lord Falsworth, at Falsworth Manor and ends up putting on the costume to help Captain America in his final battle against Baron Blood.

=== 1990s publications ===
Fabian Nicieza and Kieron Dwyer featured him in the story The Establishment for Marvel Comics Presents #42 (February 1990); in the story, set one year after his previous appearance, Chapman finds his allegiance to a group of thugs opposed to the Thatcher Government tested when they decide to terrorize Falsworth Manor; a flashback also reveals that the original Union Jack's daughter Lady Jacqueline had initially been opposed to his permanently adopting the Union Jack identity.

Dan Abnett and Gary Erskine featured Chapman in Knights of Pendragon #7-8 (January–February 1991); in the story he is shown seeking help after receiving the mystical power of the Pendragon. While John Byrne featured him again in a fiftieth anniversary celebration in Namor the Sub-Mariner #12 (March 1991); the story is about the reunion of the Invaders for a mission to rescue Namor.

Skip Dietz and Hoang Nguyen featured him in a Knights of Pendragon story for Marvel Comics Presents #122 (February 1993); the story is about an investigation into the cause of crop circles.

John Freeman pitched a follow-up to Knights of Pendragon called Armageddon Knights in late 1993, but never received a response; the story, which featured Chapman, would have wrapped up loose-ends from the preceding series.

Ben Raab and John Cassaday featured him in the three-issue Union Jack (December 1998-February 1999) mini-series; in the story he loses his friend Kenneth to the vampiric Baroness Blood.

=== 2000s publications ===
Chapman appears as a supporting character in Ben Raab and Charlie Adlard's X-Men: Hellfire Club #3 (March 2000); in the story he rescues a reporter from assassins.

Chapman also appears as a supporting character in Chuck Austen and Scott Kolins' Avengers #82-84 (July–August 2004); the story sees the re-formation of the Invaders. Austen along with Allan Jacobsen and C. P. Smith concluded this story in New Invaders #0 (August 2004), which launched a new ongoing series featuring Chapman as a regular character. During this run Jacobson and Smith featured him in a number of volumes, including, #1-3 (October–December 2004), which sees him in conflict with U.S. Agent over doubts about his membership and reveals him to be romantically involved with Lady Jacqueline, #4-5 (January–February 2005), which sees him once again battle the vampiric Baroness Blood and overcome initial animosity from his predecessor's lover, Roger Aubrey; and #7-9 (April–June 2005), which sees the dissolution of the team following the death of the original Human Torch.

Ed Brubaker and Steve Epting featured Chapman and Lady Jacqueline in Captain America (vol. 5) #18-21 (July–October 2006); in the story Captain America recruits the two heroes, who are no longer dating, to battle old enemy the Red Skull in London.

Chapman stars in yet another self-titled mini-series in late 2006, spun off from his appearance in Ed Brubaker's run on Captain America, written by Christos Gage with pencils and inks by Mike Perkins and Andrew Hennesy, respectively.

The character would then make brief appearances alongside Spitfire in Captain Britain & MI:13 #5 and 13, before becoming a member of a re-formed Invaders in Invaders Now.

Union Jack is a member of the British super team The Union created by Paul Grist and Andrea Di Vito.

== Fictional character biography ==
=== Origin ===
Joey Chapman is an art student and the working class son of a shipbuilder, born in Manchester, England. Chapman was visiting his friend Kenneth Crichton, grandson of original Union Jack, Lord James Montgomery Falsworth, when he learned of Baron Blood, who was conducting a revenge campaign against his old family at that time, and donned the costume to help Captain America fight the vampire. Chapman was allowed to keep the costume and carry on the tradition despite initial resistance from Falsworth family matriarch Jacqueline Crichton; he would repay the family by defending Falsworth Manor against a group of his anti-establishment friends one year later.

=== Knights of Pendragon ===
Chapman is later possessed by the Pendragon spirit, resulting in him taking on the Union Jack mantle. Alongside Kate McClellan and Captain Britain, he battles the minions of Bane, who kidnapped Kate's son Cam. He also joins the other Pendragons in the search for the Holy Grail at Kitsford tumnus, and fight fellow Pendragon, Iron Man. With Iron Man, Captain Britain, and the Knights of Pendragon, he battles Bane and rescues Cam McClellan. After the battle, the Pendragons are formed, establishing the Pendragon base at Camelaird Farm.

When the villainous company Mys-Tech resurrect Baron Blood, Chapman infiltrates the company, inadvertently starting the Mys-Tech wars.

Shortly after the defeat of Mys-Tech, Chapman, alongside the Pendragons fought Death's Head, Magpie, and the Lemurians of Earth-313. Upon the villains' defeat, the Pendragons disband.

=== Post-Pendragons ===
After the Pendragons disbanded, Chapman carries on protecting Britain. However, he failed to prevent Baroness Blood from using the Holy Grail to become immune to sunlight, and lost his friend Kenneth Falsworth (the true heir to the Union Jack mantle) from vampirism and death.

Joey shares a relationship with Romany Wisdom, the sister of X-Men ally Pete Wisdom. Although the relationship ends, Chapman stays in contact with Wisdom as she provides him with vital research on the occult.

=== New Invaders ===
Wearing an updated, militaristic version of his old costume Chapman joins the New Invaders, led by Jim Hammond. Chapman becomes romantically involved with his New Invaders teammate, Spitfire. However, the relationship does not last and they part because of the vast age difference. They still remain good friends and partners.

=== Terrorism in London ===
At the request of S.H.I.E.L.D., Chapman would help his good friend Captain America in searching the London Underground for the Red Skull's agents. Chapman, Rogers, Spitfire, and Sharon Carter worked together to prevent neo-Nazis and the Red Skull from devastating London.

Moving on from his vampire hunting days, he leads a makeshift team of heroes - including Valentina Allegra de Fontaine, Sabra and the third Arabian Knight - to defeat a group of super-powered terrorists intent on blowing up London.

=== MI:13 ===
Chapman appeared in Captain Britain and MI: 13, as explained by writer Paul Cornell, "One of the great things about this title is that, because all British superheroes are de facto part of MI-13, we can visit disparate parts of the Marvel UK scene without it being a big deal. Joe (not 'Joey', who's called Joey? Okay, kangaroos in Aussie, but apart from that...) is going to want to check in with [his former girlfriend Spitfire] soon. Because they parted amicably, and that's still fine with him. Right?". However, Chapman did not leave MI5 to become part of the permanent team, although he is seen working along Spitfire (who is in MI:13) to clear out a nest of "Sons of the Serpent".

=== Blood Hunt ===
During the "Blood Hunt" storyline, Union Jack saves several people from vampires who have nicknamed him "The Ripper". After being wounded, he directs them to a specific building with weapons that are effective against vampires. In addition, he is shown to have a vampiric bulldog chained up in a lower level. Vampires attack the building with a message for "The Ripper" telling him to join them or die.

== Powers and abilities ==
Like those who held the title of Union Jack before him, Joseph Chapman is an athlete in peak physical condition. He carries on the Union Jack tradition by using a Webley .455 revolver (though often uses other pistols depending on the mission he is completing) and a silver dagger which he uses for supernatural foes. His costume is also bullet-resistant.

For a time, Chapman was possessed by the spirit of Lancelot, enhancing his strength, speed, and endurance, and providing him with superhuman sensory acuity, as well as giving him the ability to sense the presence of agents of the Bane and to recognize them as such despite disguises, and access to knowledge of past incarnations of the Pendragon. He also wore a suit of magical/cybernetic exoskeleton armor composed of unknown materials that increased his strength to superhuman levels. He carried a 6' striking staff of unknown materials. Chapman could also ride Beryl, a computerized motorcycle-like vehicle equipped with extensive information databanks, recording memory files, radiation detectors, tracking sensors, automated navigation system, medical analysis instruments, remote guidance system, and the capacity for inter-dimensional travel. All of this equipment was provided by the Green Chapel, of the dimension of Avalon.

Since being possessed by the Pendragon, he has retained a portion of the powers it endowed him, to low superhuman levels.

== Collected editions ==
Joseph Chapman's major appearances have been collected in a number of trade paperbacks:

- Captain America: War and Remembrance (by John Byrne and Roger Stern, with pencils by John Byrne and inks by Josef Rubinstein, tpb includes Captain America #253-254, 1981, 208 pages, July 2007, ISBN 0-7851-2693-7)
- Union Jack (written by John Cassaday and Ben Raab, with art by John Cassaday, 3-issue mini-series, December 1998 - February 1999, tpb, 96 pages, April 2002, ISBN 0-7851-0934-X)
- New Invaders: To End All Wars (written by Allan Jacobsen, with art by Jorge Lucas and C. P. Smith, tpb collects New Invaders #1-9, October 2004 - June 2005, 216 pages, July 2005, ISBN 0-7851-1449-1)
- Captain America: Red Menace Volume 2 (written by Ed Brubaker with art by Steve Epting, tpb collects Captain America #18-21, July - October 2006, 104 pages, December 2006, ISBN 0-7851-2225-7)
- Union Jack: London Falling (written by Christos Gage, with pencils by Mike Perkins and inks by Drew Hennessy, 4-issue mini-series, November 2006 - February 2007, tpb, 96 pages, July 2007, ISBN 0-7851-2181-1)
- The Union: The Britannia Project (Trade Paperback)(written by Paul Grist, Art by Andrea Di Vito, Character Design by R.B Silva, 5-issue, December 2020, ISBN 978-1-302-92441-6

== In other media ==
- The Joseph Chapman version of Union Jack appears in Lego Marvel Super Heroes.
- The Joseph Chapman version of Union Jack appears in Lego Marvel's Avengers.
