= Tiger Shark (DC Comics) =

Tiger Shark is the name of three characters who appear in American comic books published by DC Comics.

== Fictional character biographies ==
=== Lt. Tiger Shark ===
The first Tiger Shark appeared in Military Comics #9 (May 1942), a Quality Comics publication (years before that company was purchased by DC Comics) in a Blackhawk story set in World War II. The character was more specifically called Lt. Tiger Shark, who is the skipper of the US vessel called the Phantom Clipper.

=== Tiger Shark (Dr. Gaige) ===
Tiger Shark

Publication information
- Publisher: DC Comics
- First appearance: Detective Comics #147 (May 1949)
- Created by: Bill Finger (writer); Dick Sprang (artist)

In-story information
- Alter ego: Dr. Gaige
- Species: Human
- Abilities: Brilliant criminal mastermind Array of underwater-use weapons Use of a handgun and special jet water ski

The second Tiger Shark is Dr. Gaige, who first appeared in Detective Comics #147 (May 1949). He is a famed oceanographer known for many discoveries in his field. Gaige becomes the criminal Tiger Shark out of boredom and greed, utilizing a striped diving outfit with tiger-like stripes. Tiger Shark became a brilliant criminal mastermind plotting a series of crime sprees at sea and Gotham City's waterfront. In May 1949, Batman and Robin take interest in Tiger Shark's crime spree and use the "sub-batmarine" to help them apprehend Tiger Shark. The sub-batmarine that Batman and Robin used to captured Tiger Shark had been designed especially for their use by Dr. Gaige himself, much to the surprise of both parties after Tiger Shark is unmasked by Batman and his identity exposed.

=== Tiger Shark (pirate) ===
A new Tiger Shark appears in the "Hungry City" story in Detective Comics #878 (August 2011). This version is a murderous pirate who tried to invest "dirty money" in the GGM Bank, owned by Sonia Zucco. One day, the corpse of a orca is found in the lobby of the GGM Bank, with Zucco claiming that one of her employees was found dead inside the orca's body. Commissioner Gordon suspects that someone is intimidating Zucco into opening her bank to a criminal element. Batman learns from the criminal Roadrunner that the person who tipped him off was a woman who worked for Tiger Shark. When Roadrunner is brought to Gotham City Police Department, he makes a deal for a reduced sentence in exchange for providing information. He states that Tiger Shark is planning to sell animals over the black market. Batman and Robin stake out and find Tiger Shark's yacht, learning that he had stolen exotic birds from the Gotham City Aviary. Tiger Shark knocks Batman into the yacht's pool, which contains a crazed orca. Robin defeats Tiger Shark's men, but Tiger Shark manages to escape and activates a bomb to detonate the yacht. Batman and Robin rescue the birds and return the orca to the ocean before the yacht explodes.

== Powers and abilities ==
The second Tiger Shark was a brilliant criminal mastermind able to plan spectacular crimes at sea and on Gotham's coast. He possessed an array of underwater-use weapons. Tiger Shark also almost always carried a handgun. Also, Tiger Shark and his henchmen used special jet water skis that enable them to maneuver on and under water.

== In other media ==
The second incarnation of Tiger Shark makes non-speaking appearances in Batman: The Brave and the Bold.

== See also ==
- List of Batman family enemies
