= Warrior Woman (Marvel Comics) =

- Julia Koenig as Warrior Woman on the cover of Invaders Now! #3 (January 2011). Art by Alex Ross.

Publication information
- Publisher: Marvel Comics
- First appearance: The Invaders #16 (May 1977) (as Julia Koenig); The Invaders #17 (June 1977) (as Warrior Woman)
- Created by: Roy Thomas (writer); Frank Robbins (artist)

In-story information
- Alter ego: Julia Frieda Koenig Lohmer
- Species: Human
- Team affiliations: Super-Axis
- Abilities: Superhuman strength and stamina; Longevity; Marksmanship; Skilled combatant

Warrior Woman is a supervillain appearing in American comic books published by Marvel Comics. The character was created as an homage to the DC Comics character Wonder Woman.

== Publication history ==
Julia Koenig as Warrior Woman on the cover of Invaders #17 (June 1977). Art by Gil Kane.

Warrior Woman first appears in The Invaders #16 (May 1977), in a story titled "The Short Happy Life of Major Victory", and was created by Roy Thomas and Frank Robbins. She is brought back later in Namor the Sub-Mariner.

== Fictional character biography ==
Julia Koenig first appears in a multi-issue storyline in the title Invaders, posing as a servicewoman dating an American soldier in London during World War II. Koenig is revealed to be a Nazi spy, code-named Madame Rätsel (Madame Mystery), who is sent to obtain information from a soldier, who was also a cartoonist and is suspected of knowing the secret of the Super-Soldier Serum, which originally empowered hero Captain America. The soldier is captured and interrogated by Koenig, who attempts to replicate the experiment. The materials used are unstable. When a superior officer intervenes, trying to stop Koenig from using the formula on herself, she whips him, accidentally throwing him into the machinery. This causes an explosion that gives Koenig similar abilities to Master Man.

To celebrate the capture of the Invaders, Adolf Hitler insists Koenig and Master Man marry, his logic being that they are the progenitors of a new race. The ceremony is interrupted when the priest is killed by rubble from a building damaged during a battle between the Invaders and German troops. Warrior Woman and Master Man retreat when confronted by the Human Torch, who becomes enraged when his ward, Toro, is wounded by gunfire. The character reappears in the final issue of the Invaders as part of the team Super-Axis.

Near the end of World War II, Baron Strucker placed Warrior Woman and Master Man in suspended animation in a hidden laboratory, thereby "preserving" the Nazi dream for use at a later time. Master Man is revived by Axl Nacht's scientists and abducts the original Human Torch and Ann Raymond (Toro's widow) in a bid to revive Warrior Woman, who had suffered brain damage. Nacht betrays Master Man when it is revealed that his father first cared for the two superbeings while in suspended animation, and unknowingly instilled in the younger Nacht an obsession with Warrior Woman. When Namor finds the laboratory, he battles Master Man until the Nazi loses his abilities and reverts to Wilhelm Lohmer. Nacht steals Master Man's abilities for himself, and has apparently also won the affections of the revived, but unstable, Warrior Woman.
