= Jason Bard =

Fictional character in the DC Universe

- Art from Batman Eternal #52 (April 2015) by Tim Seeley.

Publication information
- Publisher: DC Comics
- First appearance: Detective Comics #392 (October 1969)
- Created by: Frank Robbins

In-story information
- Full name: Jason Bard
- Team affiliations: Gotham City Police Department; United States Marine Corps
- Supporting character of: Batman; Robin; Barbara Gordon

Jason Bard is a fictional character appearing in American comic books published by DC Comics. He first appeared in Detective Comics #392, which was published in 1969. He appeared in several back-up stories throughout the 1970s and 1980s in Detective Comics.

== Fictional character biography ==
=== Pre-Crisis ===
As a young boy, Jason Bard vowed to exact revenge on his father, who had murdered his mother. However, Jason did not know who his father was as his mother had destroyed all of the pictures that she had of him. This would make finding his father very difficult. After giving up his quest for revenge, Bard joined the Marines and was deployed to serve in the Vietnam War. While in Vietnam, he received a crippling injury to his right knee. He left the service and attended college on the G.I. Bill, majoring in criminology. Jason utilized his new degree and opened a Private Investigations office in Gotham City, where he earned a reputation for being an intelligent and ethical private investigator. Bard's services have been used by Batman on several occasions and he also became a professional acquaintance of Commissioner Gordon. Jason became very close to Barbara Gordon and the two dated for some time, during which time he occasionally worked alongside her alter-ego, Batgirl. During this first adventure with Barbara/Batgirl, his war disability was emphasized as he was occasionally incapacitated when his knee gave out.

=== Post-Crisis ===
After the mini-series Crisis on Infinite Earths, much of DC Comics continuity was rebooted. Jason Bard's history had undergone some changes. This version is a police officer with the GCPD working under James Gordon, where he met Barbara Gordon. Killer Moth shoots Jason in the knee, forcing him to leave the GCPD and pursue other ventures. It was after this that he opened up his own Private Investigations and his relationship with Barbara began. The two dated for sometime and they were even engaged to be married at one point. After the events of The Killing Joke, when Barbara is shot and crippled by the Joker, she breaks up with Jason.

In Birds of Prey, Barbara Gordon (now known as Oracle), sends Black Canary on a mission to the island of Rheelasia. She meets Jason Bard, who is working undercover in Rheelasia. Both he and Black Canary are captured and forced to work in the fields on the island. Black Canary was planning to escape with Jason's help, but it was revealed that the attack caused Jason to lose his eyesight. Together the two escape the island after a fight with Hellhound and some Rheelasian mercenaries.

=== The New 52 ===
In The New 52, Jason Bard makes his first appearance in Batman Eternal, as a cop from Detroit hired by Jim Gordon and put into the Major Crimes Unit. He experiences his own rise to power after Gordon is fired for seeming incompetence, exposing the corruption of the new commissioner's alliance with Carmine Falcone to take the position himself. Bard is soon revealed to be allied with Hush, destroying evidence gathered by the Bat-Family that proved that Gordon was set up to cause the accident that led to his arrest and using Hush's insight and resources to identify various weapons caches Batman has hidden around Gotham and detonate them, ruining Batman and Wayne Enterprises' reputation. Vicki Vale's research reveals that Bard has a vendetta against vigilantes ever since an amateur Batman wannabe in Detroit led to the death of Jodie Hawkins, Bard's partner and potential romantic interest.

== Powers and abilities ==
Jason Bard is a capable fighter, criminologist and marksman.

== In other media ==
Jason Bard appears in Young Justice, voiced by Jeff Bennett. This version is a private in the United States Marine Corps and an acquaintance of John Jones. In the fourth season, Phantoms, Bard leaves the Marines, becomes a detective, and enters a relationship with Artemis Crock.

== See also ==
- List of Batman supporting characters
