= Frank Robbins =

American cartoonist (1917–1994)

- Frank Robbins c. 1968
- Born: Franklin Robbins; September 9, 1917 Boston, Massachusetts, U.S.
- Died: November 28, 1994 (aged 77) San Miguel de Allende, Mexico
- Areas: Writer, Penciller
- Notable works: Batman; Detective Comics; The Invaders; Johnny Hazard; Superboy
- Spouse: Bertha Robbins (m. 1945, divorced)
- Children: Michael Robbins, Laurie R. Cox

Franklin Robbins (September 9, 1917 – November 28, 1994) was an American comic book and comic strip artist and writer, as well as a prominent painter whose work appeared in museums including the Whitney Museum of American Art, where one of his paintings was featured in the 1955 Whitney Annual Exhibition of American Painting.

== Early life ==
Born in Boston, Robbins was in his teens when he received a Rockefeller grant and scholarships to the Boston Museum and the National Academy of Design in New York. Robbins was married to his wife, Bertha in 1945; they had two children, Michael and Laurie Robbins.

== Career ==
Robbins' early career included work as an assistant to Edward Trumbull on his NBC building murals, and creating promotional materials for RKO Pictures.

=== Comic strips ===
Between February and April 1939, Frank Robbins illustrated the western comic strip Lightnin’ and Lone Rider for the Associated Features Syndicate, owned by Robert W. Farrell, the strip had been initiated by Jack Kirby and written by Farrell, later reprinted in Eastern Color Printing's Famous Funnies. That same year, the Associated Press hired Robbins to take over the aviation strip Scorchy Smith which he drew until 1944. Robbins created his Johnny Hazard strip in 1944 and worked on it for more than three decades until it ended in 1977. Robbins' Johnny Hazard comic book was published by Standard Comics from August 1948 to May 1949. The Sunday strips were reprinted in a full-color volume published by the Pacific Comics Club. Other reprints were published by Pioneer Comics and Dragon Lady Press.

=== Comic books ===
Cover for Johnny Hazard #7 (April 1949)

In 1968, Robbins began working as a writer for DC Comics. His first story for that publisher appeared in Superman's Girl Friend, Lois Lane #83 (May 1968). He became the writer of Superboy as of issue #149 (July 1968) and began writing Batman and Detective Comics the following month. Robbins and artist Irv Novick crafted the story which revealed the last name of Batman's butler Alfred Pennyworth in Batman #216 (Nov. 1969). It was later revealed that Robbins had simply used the name created by former DC editor Whitney Ellsworth for the Batman syndicated comic strip. The Robbins and Novick team was instrumental in returning Batman to the character's gothic roots as in the story "One Bullet Too Many".

Working with editor Julius Schwartz and artists Neal Adams and Irv Novick, he would revitalize the character with a series of noteworthy stories reestablishing Batman's dark, brooding nature. He introduced Jason Bard as a supporting character in Detective Comics #392 (Oct. 1969) and later wrote a series of backup stories featuring the character. Man-Bat was co-created by Robbins and Neal Adams in Detective Comics #400 (June 1970). Robbins and Novick created the Ten-Eyed Man in Batman #226 (Nov. 1970) and the Spook in Detective Comics #434 (April 1973). Robbins helped launch the Plop! title and briefly drew DC's licensed version of The Shadow before moving to Marvel Comics. There he launched the Invaders series with writer Roy Thomas in 1975 and co-created the characters Union Jack, Spitfire, and the Kid Commandos. Other Marvel work included Captain America and Ghost Rider as well as the licensed characters Human Fly and Man from Atlantis. His final new comics work was published in the black-and-white magazine The Tomb of Dracula vol. 2 #2 (Dec. 1979).

== Later life and death ==
Robbins moved to San Miguel de Allende, Mexico, and spent his final years focusing on painting. He died of a heart attack on November 28, 1994.

== Legacy ==
The Frank Robbins collection at Syracuse University has 1,090 original Johnny Hazard strips, consisting of 934 daily strips and 156 Sunday strips. Comic creators who cite his influence include Chris Samnee.

== Bibliography ==
Interior pencil work (except where noted) includes:

=== DC Comics ===
- Atom #38 (writer) (1968)
- Batman #204–207, 209–212, 214–217, 219–222, 226, 230–231, 236, 246, 249–250, 252, 254 (writer) (1968–1974)
- Detective Comics #378–383, 386, 388–436 (writer); #416, 420–421, 426, 429, 435 (writer/artist) (1968–1973)
- The Flash #180–181, 183–185 (writer) (1968–1969)
- G.I. Combat #170 (writer) (1974)
- House of Mystery #224, 226, 228, 233, 241–242, 252 (1974–1977)
- House of Secrets #125 (1974)
- Plop! #1 (writer); #4, 17 (1973–1975)
- The Shadow #5, 7–9 (1974–1975)
- Sinister House of Secret Love #3 (writer) (1972)
- Star Spangled War Stories #172–182 (Unknown Soldier) (writer) (1973–1974)
- Strange Sports Stories #1–3, 5 (writer) (1973–1974)
- Superboy #149–155, 157–164, 166–172, 181 (writer) (1968–1972)
- Superman #208, 211 (writer) (1968)
- Superman's Girl Friend, Lois Lane #83 (writer) (1968)
- Weird Mystery Tales #16 (1975)
- Weird War Tales #21, 27, 35–36 (1974–1975)

=== Marvel Comics ===
- Adventure into Fear #25–28, 31 (Morbius) (1974–1975)
- Captain America #182–183, 185–187, 189–192 (1975)
- Daredevil #155 (1978)
- Ghost Rider #12, 17–19 (1975–1976)
- Human Fly #5–6, 8–9, 13–14 (1978)
- Invaders #1–4, 6–9, 11–15, 17–23, 25–28, Annual #1, Giant-Size #1 (1975–1978)
- Man from Atlantis #1–7 (1978)
- Marvel Chillers #4 (Tigra) (1976)
- Marvel Premiere #28 (Legion of Monsters) (1976)
- Power Man #32–34 (1976)
- The Tomb of Dracula vol. 2 #2 (1979)
- Unknown Worlds of Science Fiction #2 (1975)
- What If...? #4 (1977)

=== Standard Comics ===
- Johnny Hazard #5–8 (1948–1949)

Preceded by Leo Dorfman	Superboy writer 1968–1972	Succeeded by Leo Dorfman
Preceded by Gardner Fox	Batman writer 1968–1974	Succeeded by Len Wein
Preceded by Gardner Fox	Detective Comics writer 1968–1973	Succeeded by Archie Goodwin
Preceded by Archie Goodwin	Star Spangled War Stories writer 1973–1974	Succeeded by David Michelinie
Preceded by Michael Kaluta	The Shadow artist 1974–1975	Succeeded by E. R. Cruz
Preceded by n/a	The Invaders artist 1975–1978	Succeeded by Alan Kupperberg
Preceded by Sal Buscema	Captain America artist 1974–1975	Succeeded by Jack Kirby
