= List of X-Men limited series and one-shots =

The X-Men are a group of superheroes in the Marvel Comics universe. The X-Men first appeared in the self-titled X-Men comic, cover-dated September 1963. Due to the X-Men's immense popularity, Marvel has launched dozens of spin-off limited series.

Like Uncanny X-Men, most X-books feature mutants, humans born with extraordinary powers due to a genetic mutation. Some X-books feature mutant superhero teams while others feature solo adventures of characters who became popular in Uncanny X-Men or another X-book. Occasionally, X-books use mutants as a metaphor for racial, religious and other minorities oppressed by society.

For the purpose of this list, "X-Men miniseries" will be defined by the following criteria:

- The series was not meant to continue indefinitely. For ongoing titles, see List of X-Men comics.
- One-shot issues are included ("minus one" issues do not count).
- Graphic novels with original content are included. Reprints are not.
- The series featured mostly characters associated with and/or concepts originating in Uncanny X-Men or another X-book; thus The Defenders and The Champions, which featured both X-Men-related and non-X-Men-related characters will not be counted, and neither will all series which occasionally featured X-Men characters, such as Marvel Comics Presents, Marvel Team-Up and What If?, though some relevant issues of those series may be included.

== Graphic novels ==
- Dazzler: The Movie (1984)
- Deadpool: Bad Blood (2017)
- Excalibur: Weird War III (1990)
- The New Mutants (1982)
- Wolverine: Bloodlust (1990)
- Wolverine: Bloody Choices (1991)
- Wolverine: Knight of Terra (1995)
- Wolverine: Rahne of Terra (1991)
- Wolverine/Nick Fury: The Scorpio Connection (1989)
- X-Men: God Loves, Man Kills (1982)
- X-Men: No More Humans (2014)

== Main limited series ==
=== 1970s ===
Date/Year	Title	Issues	Creative Team	Notes
1972	Amazing Adventures vol. 2	11–17	Various writers and artists	story of Beast
1975	Giant-Size X-Men	1–4	#1: Len Wein (W) Dave Cockrum (A) #2: Roy Thomas (W) Neal Adams (A) #3: Joss Whedon (W) Neal Adams (A) #4: Chris Claremont (W) Neal Adams (A)	issues #3-4 published in 2005
1979	Amazing Adventures vol. 3	1–14	Various writers and artists	reprints early X-Men comics

=== 1980s ===
Date/Year	Title	Issues	Creative Team	Notes
1982	Wolverine vol. 1	1–4	Chris Claremont (W) Frank Miller (A)	
1982	X-Men Companion	1–2	Peter Sanderson (E) Michael Golden, Gil Kane (CA)	Includes interviews with the X-Men creators
1983	Magik vol. 1	1–4	Chris Claremont (W); John Buscema (A)	
1983	X-Men Classics	1–3	Roy Thomas (W) Neal Adams (A)	
1984	Beauty and the Beast	1–4	Ann Nocenti (W) Don Perlin (A)	
1984	Kitty Pryde and Wolverine vol. 1	1–6	Chris Claremont (W); Al Milgrom (A)	
1984	X-Men and the Micronauts	1–4	Chris Claremont, Bill Mantlo (W) Butch Guice, Bob Wiacek (A)	
1984	Iceman vol. 1	1–4	J. M. DeMatteis (W); Al Kupperburg, Mike Gustovich (A)	
1985	Nightcrawler vol. 1	1–4	Dave Cockrum	
1985	Longshot vol. 1	1–6	Ann Nocenti (W); Arthur Adams, Whilce Portacio, Scott Williams (A)	
1985	X-Men/Alpha Flight vol. 1	1–2	Chris Claremont (W) Paul Smith (A)	
1986	Firestar vol. 1	1–4	Tom DeFalco (W) Mary Wilshire, Steve Leialoha, Bob Wiacek (A)	
1987	X-Men vs. the Avengers vol. 1	1–4	Roger Stern (W); Marc Silvestri (A)	
1987	Fantastic Four vs. the X-Men vol. 1	1–4	Chris Claremont (W); Jon Bogdanove, Terry Austin (A)	
1987	Fallen Angels vol. 1	1–8	Jo Duffy (W); Jon Bogdanove, Terry Austin, Marie Severin, Val Mayerik, Tony Dezuniga (A)	
1987	Official Marvel Index to the X-Men vol. 1	1–7	Howard Mackie (E)	
1988	Havok and Wolverine: Meltdown vol. 1	1–4	Walter Simonson, Louise Simonson (W) Jon J. Muth, Kent Williams (A)	
1988	Marvel Comics Presents vol. 1	1–142 150–155	Various writers and artists	featuring Wolverine, Colossus, Cyclops, Havok and Excalibur
1988	X-Terminators vol. 1	1–4	Louise Simonson (W); Jon Bogdanove (A)	
1989	Wolverine Saga vol. 1	1–4	Peter Sanderson (W) Terry Austin (A)	

=== 1990s ===
Date/Year	Title	Issues	Creative Team	Notes
1990	X-Men Spotlight on...Starjammers	1–2	Terry Kavanagh (W) Dave Cockrum (A)	
1991	Alpha Flight Special vol. 1	1–4	Fabian Nicieza (W) Michael Bair, Chris Ivy (A)	reprints Alpha Flight vol. 1 #97-100
1992	Cable: Blood and Metal	1–2	Fabian Nicieza (W) John Romita Jr., Dan Green (A)	
1993	Deadpool: The Circle Chase	1–4	Fabian Nicieza (W) Joe Madureira (A)	
1993	Gambit vol. 1	1–4	Howard Mackie (W) Lee Weeks (A)	
1993	Sabretooth vol. 1	1–4	Larry Hama (W); Mark Texeira (A)	
1993	Wolverine and the Punisher: Damaging Evidence vol. 1	1–3	Carl Potts (W); Gary Erskine (A)	
1993	X-Men Collector's Edition	1–4	Scott Lobdell (W) John Hebert, Bill Anderson, Andrew Wildman, Stephen Baskerville, Jim Craig, Dan Day (A)	promotional comics from Pizza Hut
1993	X-Men Creators' Choice	1–2	Scott Lobdell (W) Alex Saviuk, Greg Adams, Ron Lim, Bill Anderson (A)	promotional comics from Pizza Hut
1994	The Adventures of Cyclops and Phoenix vol. 1	1–4	Scott Lobdell (W); Gene Ha (A)	
1994	Bishop vol. 1	1–4	John Ostrander (W); Carlos Pacheco (A)	
1994	Deadpool vol. 1	1–4	Mark Waid (W); Ian Churchill, Lee Weeks, Ken Lashley (A)	
1994	Marvel X-Men Collection	1–3	Jim Lee (A)	reprints from X-Men trading cards
1994	Official Marvel Index to the X-Men vol. 2	1–5	Murray Ward (E) Steven Butler, Brian Stelfreeze, Bill Sienkiewicz, Jordan Raskin, Claudio Castellini (CA)	
1994	Rogue vol. 1	1–4	Howard Mackie (W); Mike Wieringo, Terry Austin (A)	
1994	Spider-Man and X-Factor: Shadowgames	1–3	Kurt Busiek (W) Pat Broderick, Bruce Patterson, Sam dela Rosa, Keith Williams (A)	
1994	X-Men: The Ultra Collection	1–5	Various contributors	collecting the Fleer ULTRA X-MEN trading cards
1995	Age of Apocalypse Limited Series			
1995	Astonishing X-Men vol. 1	1–4	Scott Lobdell (W) Joe Madureira, Tim Townsend, Dan Green (A)	replaces Uncanny X-Men vol. 1
1995	Amazing X-Men vol. 1	1–4	Fabian Nicieza (W) Andy Kubert, Matt Ryan (A)	replaces X-Men vol. 1
1995	Factor X vol. 1	1–4	John Francis Moore (W) Steve Epting, Terry Dodson, Al Milgrom (A)	replaces X-Factor vol. 1
1995	Gambit and the X-Ternals vol. 1	1–4	Fabian Nicieza (W) Salvador Larroca, Al Milgrom (A)	replaces X-Force vol. 1
1995	Generation Next vol. 1	1–4	Scott Lobdell (W) Chris Bachalo (A)	replaces Generation X vol. 1
1995	Weapon X vol. 1	1–4	Larry Hama (W) Adam Kubert (A)	replaces Wolverine vol. 1
1995	X-Calibre vol. 1	1–4	Warren Ellis (W) Ken Lashley, Roger Cruz, Renato Arlem (A)	replaces Excalibur vol. 1
1995	X-Men Chronicles	1–2	Howard Mackie (W) Terry Dodson, Klaus Janson (A)	
1995	X-Universe	1–2	Terry Kavanagh (W) Carlos Pacheco, Terry Dodson, Cam Smith, Robin Riggs (A)	
1995	Starjammers vol. 1	1–4	Warren Ellis (W) Carlos Pacheco (A)	
1995	Wolverine/Gambit: Victims vol. 1	1–4	Jeph Loeb (W); Tim Sale (A)	
1995	X-Men Archives	1–4	Chris Claremont (W) Bill Sienkiewicz (A)	reprint New Mutants
1995	X-Men Archives Featuring Captain Britain	1–7	Paul Neary, Dave Thorpe (W) Alan Davis (A)	
1995	X-Men: Time Gliders	1–4	Ben Raab (W) Mike Gustovich, Dan McConnel, David Boller, John Hebert, Bill Anderson (A)	Kid's Meal giveaway by the Roy Roger's food chain and Hardee's Hamburger chain
1995-96	Storm vol. 1	1-4	Warren Ellis (W) Terry Dodson (A)	
1996	Adventures of Spider-Man / Adventures of the X-Men	1–12	Ralph Macchio (W) Ben Herrera, Mike Christian (A)	flip book
1996	Askani'son vol. 1	1–4	Scott Lobdell (W); Jeph Loeb, Gene Ha, Andrew Pepoy (A)	
1996	The Further Adventures of Cyclops & Phoenix	1–4	Peter Milligan (W) John Paul Leon (A)	
1996	Magneto vol. 2	1–4	Peter Milligan (W); Jorge Gonzalez, Kelley Jones, John Beatty (A)	
1996	Pryde and Wisdom vol. 1	1–3	Warren Ellis (W); Terry Dodson, Karl Story (A)	
1996	The Rise of Apocalypse vol. 1	1–4	Terry Kavanagh (W); James Felder, Adam Pollina, Mark Morales (A)	
1996	Sabretooth and Mystique vol. 1	1–4	Jorge Gonzalez (W); Ariel Olivetti, Pier Brito (A)	cover reads Sabretooth and Mystique, but indicia is Mystique & Sabretooth
1996	Wolverine Encyclopedia	1–2	Paul Benjamin, Peter Sanderson, Dave Rios, Mark Bourne, Jerald DeVictoria (W) Various (A)	
1996	X.S.E. vol 1	1–4	John Ostrander (W); Chris Gardner, Terry Austin (A)	
1996	X-Men vs. Brood: Day of Wrath vol. 1	1–2	John Ostrander (W); Bryan Hitch (A)	
1996	X-Men: ClanDestine vol. 1	1–2	Alan Davis (W/A)	
1996	X-Nation 2099	1–6	Tom Peyer, Ben Raab, Terry Kavanagh (W) Humberto Ramos, Jimmy Palmiotti, Roberto Flores, Mike S. Miller, Ralph Cabrera, Harry Candelario, Eric Battle, Jon Holdredge, Ed McGuinness (A)	
1997	Beast vol. 1	1–3	Keith Giffen, Terry Kavanagh (W); Cedric Nocon (A)	
1997	Daydreamers vol. 1	1–3	J.M. DeMatteis, Todd Dezago (W); Martin Egeland, Howard M. Shum (A)	
1997	Domino vol. 1	1–3	Ben Raab (W); David Perrin, Harry Candelario (A)	
1997	Deathblow/Wolverine vol. 1	1–2	Aron Wiesenfeld (W) Richard Bennett (A)	
1997	Gambit vol. 2	1–4	Howard Mackie, Terry Kavanaugh (W); Klaus Janson (A)	
1997	Imperial Guard vol. 1	1–3	Brian Augustyn (W); Chuck Wojtkiewicz (A)	
1997	Kitty Pryde, Agent of S.H.I.E.L.D. vol. 1	1–3	Larry Hama (W); Jesus Redondo, Sergio Melia (A)	
1997	New Mutants: Truth or Death vol. 1	1–3	Ben Raab (W); Bernard Chang, Mark Pennington (A)	
1997	Psylocke & Archangel: Crimson Dawn vol. 1	1–4	Ben Raab (W); Salvador Larroca, Art Thibert (A)	
1997	Wolverine: Days of Future Past vol. 1	1–3	John Francis Moore, Joe Casey (W); Joe Bennett, Jon Holdredge (A)	
1997	X-Men: Lost Tales vol. 1	1–2	Chris Claremont (W); John Bolton (A)	
1998	Bishop: Xavier Security Enforcer	1–3	John Ostrander (W) Steve Epting, Nick Napolitano, Mark Prudeaux, Robert Jones, Andrew Pepoy, Steve Moncuse (A)	
1998	Sunfire & Big Hero Six	1–3	Scott Lobdell, Steve Seagle, Duncan Rouleau (W) Gus Vazquez, Bud LaRosa (A)	
1998	Marvel Collectible Classics: X-Men	1–6	Stan Lee, Chris Claremont, Fabian Nicieza, Len Wein, Jim Lee (W) Jack Kirby, John Byrne, Andy Kubert, Gil Kane, Dave Cockrum, Scott Williams(A)	all comics have chromium covers, also incorrectly spelled as "collectible" instead of "collectable
1998	X-Men/Alpha Flight vol. 2	1–2	Ben Raab (W) John Cassaday (W/A)	
1998	X-Men: Liberators	1–4	Joe Harris Phil Jimenez, Keith Aiken, Andrew Pepoy, Rob Leigh, John Stokes (A)	
1999	Magneto Rex	1–3	Joe Pruett (W) Brandon Peterson, Matt Banning (A)	
1999	Wolverine/Punisher: Revelation	1–4	Tom Sniegoski, Christopher Golden (W) Pat Lee (A)	
1999	X-Men: Children of the Atom vol. 1	1–6	Joe Casey (W) Steve Rude, Paul Smith, Michael Ryan, Andrew Pepoy, Esad Ribić (A)	
1999	X-Men: Phoenix vol. 1	1–3	John Francis Moore (W) Pascal Alixe, Lary Stucker (A)	
1999	X-Men: True Friends	1–3	Chris Claremont Rick Leonardi, Jimmy Palmiotti (A)	

=== 2000s ===
Date/Year	Title	Issues	Creative Team	Notes
2000	Avengers Two: Wonder Man & Beast	1–3	Roger Stern (W) Mark Bagley, Greg Adams (A)	
2000	Before the Fantastic 4: Ben Grimm and Logan	1–3	Larry Hama (W) Kaare Andrews, Walden Wong (A)	
2000	Iron Fist: Wolverine	1–4	Jay Faerber (W) Jamal Igle, Rich Perrotta (A)	
2000	Magik vol. 2	1–4	Dan Abnett, Andy Lanning (W) Liam Sharp (A)	
2000	Magneto: Dark Seduction	1–4	Fabian Nicieza (W) Roger Cruz (A)	
2000	X-Men: Black Sun	1–5	Chris Claremont, Len Wein, Louise Simonson (W) Thomas Derenick, Sean Parsons, Mark McKenna, Karl Waller, Pablo Raimondi (A)	
2000	X-Men: Millennial Visions	1–2	Various writers and artists	issue #2 was published in 2002
2000	X-Men: The Hellfire Club	1–4	Ben Raab (W) Charlie Adlard (A)	
2000	X-Men: The Search for Cyclops	1–4	Joseph Harris (W) Tom Raney, Scott Hanna (A)	
2001	Blink	1–4	Scott Lobdell (W) Trevor McCarthy (A)	
2001	Cyclops vol. 1	1–4	Brian K. Vaughan (W) Mark Texeira, Jimmy Palmiotti (A)	
2001	Elektra and Wolverine: The Redeemer	1–3	Greg Rucka (W) Yoshitaka Amano (A)	
2001	Excalibur vol. 2	1–4	Ben Raab (W) Pablo Raimondi, Jason Martin (A)	
2001	Gambit and Bishop	1–6	Scott Lobdell, Joe Pruett (W) Georges Jeanty, Cary Nord, Thomas Derenick (A)	
2001	Iceman vol 2	1–4	Dan Abnett, Andy Lanning (W) Skottie Young, Greg Titus (A)	
2001	Rogue vol. 2	1–4	Fiona Avery (W) Aaron Lopresti, Randy Emberlin (A)	
2001	Wolverine: The Origin	1–6	Paul Jenkins (W) Andy Kubert (A)	
2001	X-Men Forever vol. 1	1–6	Fabian Nicieza (W) Kevin Maguire (A)	
2001	X-Treme X-Men: Savage Land	1–4	Chris Claremont (W) Kevin Sharpe, Danny Miki, Larry Stucker (A)	
2002	Chamber	1–4	Brian K. Vaughan (W) Lee Ferguson, Norm Rapmund (A)	
2002	Mekanix	1–6	Chris Claremont (W) Juan Bobillo, Marcelo Sosa (A)	
2002	Morlocks	1–4	Geoff Johns (W) Shawn Martinbrough (A)	
2002	Muties	1–6	Karl Bollers (W) Peter Ferguson, Max Douglas (A)	
2002	Nightcrawler vol. 2	1–4	Chris Kipiniak (W) Matt Smith (A)	
2002	Sabretooth: Mary Shelley Overdrive	1–4	Dan Jolley (W) Greg Scott (A)	
2002	Wolverine: Netsuke	1–4	George Pratt (W/A)	
2002	Wolverine/Hulk	1–4	Sam Keith (W/A)	
2002	X-Factor vol. 2	1–4	Jeff Jensen (W) Arthur Ranson (A)	
2003	Domino vol. 2	1–4	Joe Pruett (W) Brian Stelfreeze (A)	
2003	Hulk/Wolverine: Six Hours	1–4	Bruce Jones (W) Scott Kolins (A)	
2003	NYX	1–7	Joe Quesada (W) Robert Teranishi, Joshua Middleton (A)	
2003	Spider-Man & Wolverine	1–4	Zeb Wells (W) Joe Madureira (A)	
2003	Wolverine: Snikt!	1–5	Tsutomu Nihei (W/A)	
2003	Wolverine: Xisle	1–5	Bruce Jones (W) Jorge Lucas (A)	
2003	Wolverine/Doop	1–2	Peter Milligan (W) Darwyn Cooke, J. Bone (A)	
2003	X-Men: Phoenix – Legacy of Fire	1–3	Ryan Kinnaird (W/A)	
2003	X-Men: Ronin	1–5	J. Torres (W) Makoto Nakatsuka (A)	
2003	X-Treme X-Men X-Posé	1–2	Chris Claremont (W) Arthur Ransom (A)	
2004	Jubilee	1–6	Robert Kirkman (W) Derec Donovan (A)	
2004	Madrox	1–5	Peter David (W) Pablo Raimondi (A)	
2004	Sabretooth vol. 2	1–4	Daniel Way (W) Bart Sears (A)	
2004	Secret War	1–5	Brian Michael Bendis (W) Gabrielle Dell'Otto (A)	
2004	Starjammers vol. 2	1–6	Kevin J. Anderson (W) Ale Garza, Jorge Lucas (A)	
2004	Wolverine: The End	1–6	Paul Jenkins (W) Claudio Castellini (A)	
2004	Wolverine/Captain America	1–4	Tom Derenick (W/A)	
2004	Wolverine/Punisher	1–5	Peter Milligan (W) Lee Weeks (A)	
2004	X-23: Innocence Lost vol 1.	1–6	Craig Kyle, Christopher Yost (W) Billy Tan (A)	
2004	X-Force vol. 2	1–6	Fabian Nicieza (W) Rob Liefeld (A)	
2004	X-Men: The End vol. 1	1–6	Chris Claremont (W) Sean Chen (A)	
2005	Colossus: Bloodline	1–5	David Hine (W) Jorge Lucas (A)	
2005	Fantastic Four: House of M	1–3	John Layman (W) Scot Eaton (A)	part of House of M
2005	Generation M	1–5	Paul Jenkins (W) Roman Bachs (A)	part of Decimation
2005	House of M	1–8	Brian Michael Bendis (W) Olivier Coipel (A)	part of House of M
2005	Iron Man: House of M	1–3	Greg Pak (W) Pat Lee (A)	part of House of M
2005	Mutopia X	1–5	David Hine (W) Lan Medina (A)	
2005	New X-Men: Hellions	1–4	Nunzio DeFilippis, Christina Weir (W) Clayton Henry (A)	
2005	Ororo: Before the Storm	1–4	Marc Sumerak (W) Carlo Barberi (A)	
2005	Spider-Man: House of M	1–5	Mark Waid, Tom Peyer (W) Salvador Larroca (A)	
2005	Weapon X: Days of Future Now	1–5	Frank Tieri (W) Bart Sears (A)	
2005	Wolverine: Soultaker	1–5	Akira Yoshida (W) Shin Nagasawa (A)	
2005	X-Force: Shatterstar	1–4	Rob Liefeld, Brandon Thomas (W) Marat Mychaels (A)	
2005	X-Men and Power Pack	1–4	Marc Sumerak (W) Gurihiru (A)	
2005	X-Men: Age of Apocalypse	1–6	Akira Yoshida, Scott Lobdell, Tony Bedard, Larry Hama (W) Chris Bachalo, Adam Kubert, Andy Kubert, Tony Daniel, Mark Brooks, Paco Medina, Talent Caldwell, Roger Cruz, Kia Asamiya (A)	
2005	X-Men: Deadly Genesis	1–6	Ed Brubaker (W) Trevor Hairsine (A)	
2005	X-Men: Kitty Pryde – Shadow and Flame	1–5	Akira Yoshida (W) Paul Smith (A)	
2005	X-Men: Phoenix - Endsong	1–5	Greg Pak (W) Greg Land (A)	
2005	X-Men: The End vol. 2	1–6	Chris Claremont (W) Sean Chen (A)	
2005	X-Men/Fantastic Four vol. 1	1–5	Akira Yoshida (W) Pat Lee (A)	
2006	Civil War: X-Men	1–4	Cullen Bunn, Gerry Conway (W) Andrea Broccardo, Mike Sekowsky, Bill Everett (A)	part of Civil War
2006	Marvel Milestones: Jim Lee and Chris Claremont X-Men & The Starjammers	1–2	Chris Claremont (W) Jim Lee (A)	reprints Uncanny X-Men vol. 1 (1981) #275–276
2006	Scholastic X-Men Marvel Encyclopedia	1–2	Eric J. Moreels, Ronald Byrd, Stuart Vandal (W) Mike Deodato (CA)	does not have the word Scholastic on the cover
2006	Sentinel vol. 2	1–5	Sean McKeever (W) Udon (A)	
2006	Sentinel Squad O*N*E	1–5	John Layman (W) Aaron Lopresti (A)	part of Decimation
2006	Son of M	1–6	David Hine (W) Roy Allan Martinez (A)	part of Decimation
2006	Ultimate Wolverine vs Hulk: Director's Cut vol. 1	1–6	Damon Lindelof (W) Leinil Yu (A)	
2006	Ultimate Wolverine vs. Hulk vol. 1	1–6	Damon Lindelof (W) Leinil Yu (A)	
2006	Ultimate X-Men/Fantastic Four - Ultimate Fantastic Four/X-Men	1–2	Mike Carey (W) Pasqual Ferry (A)	the two books in this limited series were titled differently
2006	X-Men Fairy Tales	1–4	C. B. Cebulski (W) Sana Takeda, Kyle Baker, Kei Kobayashi, Bill Sienkiewicz (A)	
2006	X-Men: Apocalypse vs. Dracula	1–4	Frank Tieri (W) Clayton Henry (A)	
2006	First Class vol. 1	1–8	Jeff Parker (W) Roger Cruz (A)	
2006	X-Men: Phoenix—Warsong	1–5	Greg Pak (W) Tyler Kirkham (A)	
2006	X-Men: The 198	1–5	David Hine (W) Jim Muniz (A)	part of Decimation
2006	X-Men: The End vol. 3	1–6	Chris Claremont (W) Sean Chen (A)	
2006	X-Statix Presents: Dead Girl	1–5	Peter Milligan (W) Nick Dragotta, Michael Allred (A)	
2007	Claws	1–3	Jimmy Palmiotti, Justin Gray (W) Joseph Michael Linsner (A)	
2007	Onslaught Reborn	1–5	Jeph Loeb (W) Rob Liefeld (A)	
2007	Wisdom	1–6	Paul Cornell (W) Trevor Hairsine, Manuel Garcia (A)	
2007	World War Hulk: X-Men	1–3	Dan Slott, Robert Kirkman, Christos N. Gage, Daniel Way (W) Stefano Caselli, Butch Guice, Javier Saltares, Andrea Di Vito (A)	part of World War Hulk
2007	X-23: Target X	1–6	Craig Kyle, Christopher Yost (W) Mike Choi (A)	
2007	X-Men: Die by the Sword	1–5	Chris Claremont (W) Juan Santacruz (A)	
2008	Angel: Revelations	1–5	Roberto Aguiire-Sacasa (W) Adam Pollina (A)	
2008	Astonishing X-Men: Ghost Boxes	1–2	Warren Ellis (W) Alan Davis, Adi Granov (A)	
2008	Logan	1–3	Brian K. Vaughan (W) Eduardo Risso (A)	
2008	NYX: No Way Home	1–6	Marjorie Liu (W) Kalman Andrasofszky (A)	
2008	Secret Invasion: X-Men	1–4	Mike Carey (W) Cary Nord (A)	part of Secret Invasion
2008	Wolverine and Power Pack	1–4	Marc Sumerak (W) Chris Giarrusso (W/A) Gurihiru (A)	
2008	Wolverine: Manifest Destiny	1–4	Jason Aaron (W) Stephen Segovia (A)	
2008	X-Men: Divided We Stand	1–2	Mike Carey, Matt Fraction, Craig Kyle, Christopher Yost, Skottie Young, C.B. Cebulski, Duane Swierczynski, Andy Schmidt (W) Brandon Peterson, Jamie McKelvie, Sana Takeda, Skottie Young, Scott Eaton, David Lafuente, Frazer Irving (A)	
2008	X-Men: Emperor Vulcan	1–5	Christopher Yost (W) Paco Diaz (A)	
2008	X-Men: Magneto Testament	1–5	Greg Pak (W) Carmine Di Giandomenico (A)	
2008	X-Men: Manifest Destiny	1–5	Jason Aaron, Mike Carey, James Asmus, Frank Tieri (W) Stephen Segovia, Michael Ryan, Takeshi Miyazawa, Ben Oliver, Chris Burnham (A)	
2008	X-Men: Worlds Apart	1–4	Christoper Yost (W) Diogenes Neves (A)	
2009	Dark X-Men	1–5	Paul Cornell (W) Leonard Kirk (A)	
2009	Dark X-Men: Beginnings	1–3	Paul Cornell, James Asmus, Shane Mccarthy (W) Leonard Kirk, Jesse Delperdang, Ibraim Roberson, Jay Leisten, Andy Lanning (A)	part of Utopia
2009	Deadpool: Suicide Kings	1–4	Mike Benson, Adam Glass (W) Carlo Barberi (A)	
2009	Exiles vol. 2	1–6	Jeff Parker (W) Salvador Espin, Casey Jones (A)	
2009	Nation X	1–4	Matt Fraction, Simon Spurrier, James Asmus, Scott Snyder, C.B. Cebulski, Becky Cloonan, Tim Fish, John Barber, Chuck Kim, Grace Randolph, Corey Lewis, Peter Milligan, Roberto Aguirre-Sacasa, Joe Caramagna, AIvan Brandon (W) Greg Land, Terry Dodson, David Lopez, Stephen Thompson, Becky Cloonan, Tim Fish, Gabriel Hernandez Walta, James Harren, Corey Lewis, Mike Allred, Niko Henrichon, Harvey Talibao, Rael Lyra (A)	
2009	Psylocke	1–4	Christopher Yost (W) Harvey Tolibao (A)	
2009	Timestorm 2009-2099	1–4	Brian Reed (W) Eric Battle, Wesley Craig (A)	
2009	Uncanny X-Men: First Class	1–8	Jeff Parker, Scott Gray (W) Craig Rousseau, Cameron Stewart, Dennis Calero, Sean Galloway, David Williams, Roger Cruz (A)	
2009	Weapon X: First Class	1–3	Marc Sumerak (W) Mark Robinson, Tim Seeley (A)	
2009	Wolverine Noir	1–4	Stuart Moore (W) C. P. Smith (A)	
2009	X-Babies	1–4	Gregg Schigiel (W) Jacob Chabot (A)	
2009	X-Infernus	1–4	C.B. Cebulski (W) Giuseppi Camuncoli (A)	
2009	X-Men Noir	1–4	Fred Van Lente (W) Dennis Calero (A).	
2009	X-Men vs. Agents of Atlas	1–2	Jeff Parker (W) Carlo Pagulayan, Chris Samnee, Jason Paz (A)	
2009	X-Men: First Class Finals	1–4	Jeff Parker (W) Roger Cruz, Colleen Coover (A)	
2009	X-Men: Kingbreaker	1–4	Christopher Yost (W) Dustin Weaver (A)	part of War of Kings
2009	X-Men: The Times and Life of Lucas Bishop	1–3	Duane Swierczynksi (W) Larry Strohman (A)	
2009	X-Men/Spider-Man	1–4	Christos Gage (W) Mario Alberti (A)	

=== 2010s ===
Date/Year	Title	Issues	Creative Team	Notes
2010	Astonishing Spider-Man & Wolverine	1–6	Jason Aaron (W) Adam Kubert (A)	
2010	Astonishing X-Men: Xenogenesis	1–5	Warren Ellis (W) Kaare Andrews (A)	
2010	Deadpool Pulp	1–4	Adam Glass, Mike Benson (W) Laurence Campbell (A)	
2010	Deadpool: Wade Wilson's War	1–4	Duane Swierczynski (W) Jason Pearson (A)	
2010	New Mutants Forever	1–5	Chris Claremont (W) Al Rio (A)	
2010	Prelude to Deadpool Corps	1–5	Victor Gischler (W) Rob Liefeld (A)	
2010	S.W.O.R.D. vol. 1	1–5	Kieron Gillen (W) Nico Leon, Valerio Schiti, Ray-Anthony Height, Bernard Chang (A)	
2010	Ultimate X: Origins	1–5	Jeph Loeb (W) Arthur Adams (A)	
2010	Wolverine & Black Cat: Claws	1–3	Justin Gray (W) Joseph Michael Linsner	
2010	World War Hulks: Wolverine vs. Captain America	1–2	Paul Tobin, Brian Clevinger (W) Jacopi Camagni, Ig Guara, Iban Coello, Gurihiru (A)	part of World War Hulks
2010	X-Campus	1–4	Francesco Artibani (W) Denis Medri, Roberto Di Salvo, Michele Medda, Marco Failla, Alessandro Vitt (A)	
2010	X-Factor Forever	1–4	Louise Simonson (W) Dan Panosian, Eric Nguyen, Aluir Almancino (A)	
2010	X-Force: Sex and Violence	1–3	Craig Kyle, Christopher Yost, Grant Morrison (W) Gabrielle Dell 'Otto, Leinil Yu (A)	
2010	X-Men Noir: Mark of Cain	1–4	Fred Van Lente (W) Dennis Calero (A)	
2010	X-Men: Curse of the Mutants - X-Men vs. Vampires	1–2	James Asmus, Peter David, Chris Sequeria, Rob Williams (W) Micj Bertilorenzi, Doug Braithwaite, Sana Takeda, Tom Raney (A)	part of Curse of the Mutants
2010	X-Men: Hellbound	1–3	Chris Yost (W) Harvey Tolibao, Tom Raney, Sandu Florea, Scott Hanna (A)	part of Second Coming
2010	X-Men: Pixie Strikes Back	1–4	Kathryn Immonen (W) Sara Pichelli (A)	
2010	X-Men: Second Coming	1–2	Christopher Yost, Craig Kyle (W) David Finch (A)	
2010	X-Men: To Serve and Protect	1–4	Chris Yost, James Asmus, Brian Reed, Joshia Hale Fialkov, Ray Fawkes, Stuart Moore, Simon Spurrier (W) Derec Donovan, Jon Buran, Pepe Larraz, James Harren, Ron Chan, Craig Yueng, Garry Brown, Ed Tadeo, David Lafuente (A)	
2011	Age of X: Universe	1–2	Simon Spurrier, Jim McCann, Chuck Kim (W) Khoi Pham, Tom Palmer, Paul Davidson, Gabriel Hernandez Walta (A)	part of Age of X
2011	Alpha Flight vol. 4	1–9	Greg Pak, Fred Van Lente (W) Ben Oliver, Dale Eaglesham (A)	
2011	Chaos War: X-Men	1–2	Chris Claremont, Louise Simonson, Jim McCann, Marc Sumerak, Brandon Montclare (W) Doug Braithwaite, Reilly Brown, Dan Panosian, Michael W.M. Kaluta (A)	part of Chaos War
2011	Deadpool Max 2	1–6	Dave Lapham (W) Kyle Baker (A)	
2011	Fear Itself: Deadpool	1–3	Christopher Hastings (W) Bong Dazo (A)	part of Fear Itself
2011	Fear Itself: Uncanny X-Force	1–3	Rob Williams, Cullen Bunn (W) Simone Bianchi, Lee Garbett (A)	part of Fear Itself
2011	Fear Itself: Wolverine	1–3	Dan Abnett (W) Roland Boschi (A)	part of Fear Itself
2011	Marvel Universe vs. Wolverine	1–4	Jonathan Maeberry (W) Laurence Campbell (A)	
2011	Onslaught Unleashed	1–4	Sean McKeever (W) Filipe Andrade (A)	
2011	Wolverine and Jubilee	1–4	Kathryn Immonen, Chris Claremont (W) Phil Noto, Marc Silvestri (A)	
2011	Wolverine, Punisher & Ghost Rider: Official Index to the Marvel Universe	1–8	Daron Jensen, Stuart Vandal, Jeph York, Paul Bourcier, Chris Buchner, Russ Chappell, Chris McCarver, Sean McQuaid, Jacob Rougemont, Kevin Wasser (W)	
2011	Wolverine/Hercules: Myths, Monsters, and Mutants	1–4	Frank Tieri (W) Juan Roman Cano Santacruz (A)	
2011	X-Men: Prelude to Schism	1–4	Paul Jenkins (W) Robert La Torre, Laurence Campbell (A)	part of Schism
2011	X-Men: Schism	1–5	Jason Aaron, Kieron Gillen (W) Carlos Pacheco, Frank Cho, Daniel Acuña, Alan David, Adam Kubert (A)	part of Schism
2012	Avengers vs. X-Men	0–12	Jason Aaron, Brian Michael Bendis, Ed Brubaker, Matt Fraction, Jonathan Hickman (W) John Romita Jr., Ed McGuinness, Adam Kubert, Olivier Coipel, Stuart Immonen (A)	
2012	Avengers: X-Sanction	1–4	Jeph Loeb (W) Ed McGuinness (A)	
2012	AvX: Consequences	1–5	Kieron Gillen (W) Tom Raney, Steve Kurth, Allen Martinez, Scot Eaton, Andrew Hennessy, Mark Brooks, Gabriel Hernandez Walta (A)	part of Avengers vs. X-Men
2012	AvX: VS	1–6	Jason Aaron, Kathryn Immonen, Kieron Gillen, Steve McNiven, Jeph Loeb, Christopher Yost, Rick Remender, Kaare Andrews, Matt Fraction, Skottie Young (W) Adam Kubert, Stuart Immonen, Salvador Larroca, Steve McNiven, Ed McGuinness, Terry Dodson, Brandon Peterson, Kaare Andrews, Leinil Francis Yu, Tom Raney, Gerry Alanguilan, Leinil Francis Yu, John Romita, Gurihiru (A)	part of Avengers vs. X-Men
2012	Deadpool Kills the Marvel Universe	1–4	Cullen Bunn (W) Dalibor Talaji (A)	
2012	The First X-Men	1–5	Neal Adams (W/A) Christos N. Gage (W)	
2012	Magneto: Not a Hero	1–4	Skottie Young (W) Clay Mann (A)	
2012	Wolverine & the X-Men: Alpha & Omega	1–5	Brian Wood (W) Mark Brooks, Roland Boschi (A)	
2012	X-Club	1–5	Simon Surrier (W) Paul Davidson (A)	
2013	Deadpool Kills Deadpool	1–4	Cullen Bunn (W) Salva Espin (A)	
2013	Deadpool: Killustrated	1–4	Cullen Bunn (W) Matteo Lolli (A)	
2013	Fantomex Max	1–4	Andrew Hope (W) Shawn Crystal (A)	
2013	Marvel Knights: X-Men	1–5	Brahm Revel (W/A)	
2013	Ultimate Comics Wolverine vol. 1	1–4	Cullen Bunn (W) Ramon Rosanas, David Messina (A)	
2013	X-Men: Battle of the Atom	1–2	Brian Michael Bendis (W) Frank Cho, Stuart Immonen, Wade Von Grawbadger (A)	part of Battle of the Atom
2013	X-Termination	1–2	David Lapham (W) David Lopez (A)	part of X-Termination
2014	All-New Doop	1–5	Peter Milligan (W) David Lafuente (A)	
2014	Avengers & X-Men: AXIS	1–9	Rick Remender (W) Adam Kubert, Leinil Francis Yu, Rachel Dodson (A)	
2014	AXIS: Revolutions	1–4	Dennis Hopeless, Simon Spurrier, Frank Tieri, Kevin Maurer, Ray Fawkes, Frank Barbiere, John Barber, Howard Chaykin (W) Ken Lashley, Tan Eng Huat, Paul Davidson, David Lafuente, Pepe Larraz, Victor Santos, Guillermo Mogorron, Howard Chaykin, Felix Ruiz, Rodrigo Zayas, Craig Yeung (A)	part of AXIS
2014	Cataclysm: Ultimate X-Men	1–3	Joshua Hale Fialkov (W) Alvaro Martinez (A)	
2014	Deadpool vs. Carnage	1–4	Cullen Bunn (W) Salva Espin, Aaron Kim Jacinto (A)	
2014	Deadpool vs. X-Force	1–4	Duane Swierczynski (W) Pepe Larraz (A)	
2014	Deadpool: Dracula's Gauntlet	1–7	Gerry Duggan, Brian Posehn (W) Reilly Brown (A)	
2014	Deadpool's Art of War	1–4	Peter David (W) Scott Koblish (A)	
2014	Death of Wolverine	1–4	Charles Soule (W) Steve McNiven (A)	
2014	Hawkeye vs. Deadpool	1–5	Gerry Duggan (W) Matteo Lolli (A)	
2014	Longshot Saves the Marvel Universe	1–4	Christopher Hastings (W) Jacopo Camagni (A)	
2014	Night of the Living Deadpool	1–4	Cullen Bunn (W) Ramon Rosanas (A)	
2014	Origin II	1–5	Kieron Gillen (W) Adam Kubert (A)	
2015	Age of Apocalypse vol. 2	1–5	Fabian Nicieza (W) Gerardo Sandoval (A)	part of Secret Wars
2015	Deadpool vs. Thanos	1–4	Tim Seeley (W) Elmo Bondoc (A)	
2015	Deadpool's Secret Secret Wars	1–4	Cullen Bunn (W) Matteo Lolli (A)	part of Secret Wars
2015	Death of Wolverine: The Logan Legacy	1–7	Charles Soule, Tim Seeley, Marguerite Bennett, Ray Fawkes, James Tynion IV (W) Oliver Nome, Ariela Kristantina, Juan Doe, Elia Bonetti, Andy Clarke, Peter Nguyen, Sandu Florea (A)	part of Death of Wolverine
2015	Death of Wolverine: The Weapon X Program	1–5	Charles Soule (W) Salvador Larroca, Angel Unzueta, Marc Deering, Juan Vlasco, Iban Soria, Drew Geraci (A)	part of Death of Wolverine
2015	E Is For Extinction	1–4	Chris Burnham (W) Ramon Villalobos (A)	part of Secret Wars
2015	Giant-Size Little Marvel: AVX	1–4	Skottie Young (W/A)	part of Secret Wars
2015	House of M vol. 2	1–4	Dennis Hopeless (W) Marco Failla (A)	part of Secret Wars
2015	Inferno vol. 1	1–5	Dennis Hopeless (W) Javier Garron (A)	part of Secret Wars
2015	Mrs. Deadpool and the Howling Commandos	1–4	Gerry Duggan (W) Salvador Espin (A)	part of Secret Wars
2015	Old Man Logan vol. 1	1–5	Brian Michael Bendis (W) Andrea Sorrentino (A)	part of Secret Wars
2015	Return of the Living Deadpool	1–4	Cullen Bunn (W) Nicole Virella (A)	
2015	Star-Lord and Kitty Pryde	1–3	Sam Humphries (W) Alti Firmansyah (A)	part of Secret Wars
2015	X-Men '92 vol. 1	1–4	Chris Sims and Chad Bowers (W) Scott Koblish (A)	part of Secret Wars
2015	X-Tinction Agenda	1–4	Marc Guggenheim (W) Carmine Di Giandomenico (A)	part of Secret Wars
2015	Years of Future Past	1–5	Marguerite Bennett (W) Mike Norton (A)	part of Secret Wars
2016	Civil War II: X-Men	1–4	Cullen Bunn (W) Andrea Broccardo (A)	part of Civil War II
2016	Deadpool & Cable: Split Second	1–3	Fabian Nicieza (W) Reilly Brown (W/A)	
2016	Deadpool & the Mercs for Money vol. 1	1–5	Cullen Bunn (W) Salvador Espin (A)	
2016	Deadpool vs. Gambit	1–5	Ben Acker, Ben Blacker (W) Danilo Beyruth (A)	
2016	Deadpool: Back in Black	1–5	Cullen Bunn (W) Salvador Espin (A)	
2016	Death of X	1–4	Jeff Lemire, Charles Soule (W) Aaron Kuder (A)	
2016	X-Men: Worst X-Man Ever	1–5	Max Bemis (W) Michael Walsh (A)	
2017	Deadpool Kills the Marvel Universe Again	1-5	Cullen Bunn (W) Dalibor Talajić (A)	
2017	Deadpool vs. Old Man Logan	1-5	Declan Shalvey (W) Mike Henderson (A)	
2017	Deadpool vs. the Punisher	1-5	Fred Van Lente (W) Pere Pérez (A)	
2017	IVX	0–6	Charles Soule, Jeff Lemire (W) Yu Leinil (A)	
2018	Dead Man Logan	1–12	Ed Brisson (W) Mike Henderson (A)	
2018	Deadpool: Secret Agent Deadpool	1–6	Christopher Hastings (W) Salva Espin (A)	
2018	Extermination	1–5	Ed Brisson (W) Pepe Larraz (A)	
2018	Hunt for Wolverine: Adamantium Agenda	1–4	Tom Taylor (W) R. B. Silva (A)	part of Hunt for Wolverine
2018	Hunt for Wolverine: Claws of a Killer	1–4	Mariko Tamaki (W) Butch Guice (A)	part of Hunt for Wolverine
2018	Hunt for Wolverine: Mystery in Madripoor	1–4	Jim Zub (W) Thony Silas (A)	part of Hunt for Wolverine
2018	Hunt for Wolverine: Weapon Lost	1–4	Charles Soule (W) Matteo Buffagni (A)	part of Hunt for Wolverine
2018	Iceman vol. 4	1–5	Peter Milligan (W) Wilfredo Torres (A)	
2018	Infinity Wars: Weapon Hex	1–2	Ben Acker, Ben Blacker (W) Gerardo Sandoval (A)	part of Infinity Wars
2018	Legion	1–5	Peter Milligan (W) Wilfredo Torres (A)	
2018	Multiple Man	1–5	Matthew Rosenberg (W) Andy MacDonald (A)	
2018	New Mutants: Dead Souls	1–6	Matthew Rosenberg (W) Adam Gorham (A)	
2018	Phoenix Resurrection: The Return of Jean Grey	1–5	Matthew Rosenberg (W) Leinil Yu (A)	
2018	Return of Wolverine	1–5	Charles Soule (W) Steve McNiven (A)	
2018	Rogue & Gambit	1–5	Kelly Thompson (W) Pere Perez (A)	
2018	Mr. & Mrs. X	1–12	Kelly Thompson (W) Oscar Bazaldua & Javier Pina (A)	
2018	Shatterstar	1–5	Tim Seeley (W) Carlos Villa (A)	
2018	X-Men: Grand Design	1–2	Ed Piskor (W/A)	
2019	Age of X-Man: Apocalypse and the X-Tracts	1–5	Tim Seeley (W) Salva Espin (A)	part of Age of X-Man
2019	Age of X-Man: Nextgen	1–5	Ed Brisson (W) Marcus To (A)	part of Age of X-Man
2019	Age of X-Man: Prisoner X	1–5	Vita Ayala (W) German Peralta (A)	part of Age of X-Man
2019	Age of X-Man: The Amazing Nightcrawler	1–5	Seanan McGuire (W) Juan Frigeri (A)	part of Age of X-Man
2019	Age of X-Man: The Marvelous X-Men	1–5	Lonnie Nadler, Zac Thompson (W) Marco Failla (A)	part of Age of X-Man
2019	Age of X-Man: X-Tremists	1–5	Leah Williams (W) Georges Jeanty (A)	part of Age of X-Man
2019	Domino: Hotshots	1–5	Gail Simone (W) David Baldeon (A)	
2019	Fallen Angels vol. 2	1–6	Bryan Edward Hill (W) Szymon Kudranski (A)	part of Dawn of X
2019	House of X	1–6	Jonathan Hickman (W) Pepe Larraz (A)	part of Dawn of X
2019	Hulkverines	1–5	Greg Pak (W) Ario Anindito (A)	
2019	Major X	1–6	Rob Liefeld (W) Whilce Portacio, Brent Peeples (A)	
2019	Marvel Comics Presents vol. 3	1–9	Various writers and artists	featuring Wolverine
2019	Powers of X	1–6	Jonathan Hickman (W) Pepe Larraz (A)	part of Dawn of X
2019	The War of the Realms: Uncanny X-Men	1–3	Matthew Rosenberg (W) Pere Perez (A)	part of The War of the Realms
2019	Wolverine: Infinity Watch	1–5	Gerry Duggan (W) Andy MacDonald (A)	
2019	Wolverine: The Long Night	1–5	Benjamin Percy (W) Marcio Takara (A)	comic adaptation of the podcast
2019	X-Men: Grand Design – Second Genesis	1–2	Ed Piskor (W/A)	
2019	X-Men: Grand Design – X-Tinction	1–2	Ed Piskor (W/A)	

=== 2020s ===
Date/Year	Title	Issues	Creative Team	Notes
2020	Empyre: X-Men	1–4	Jonathan Hickman, Tini Howard, Gerry Duggan, Ben Percy, Leah Williams, Ed Brisson, Vita Ayala, Zeb Wells (W) Matteo Buffagni, Lucas Werneck, Andrea Broccardo, Jorge Molina (A)	part of Empyre
2020	Juggernaut vol. 2	1–5	Fabian Nicieza (W) Ron Garney (A)	
2020	Wolverine: Black, White and Blood	1–4	Gerry Duggan, Declan Shalvey, Matthew Rosenberg, Vita Ayala, Chris Claremont, Saladin Ahmed, Donny Cates, Jed MacKay, John Ridley, Steven S. DeKnight, Kelly Thompson, Ed Brisson (W) Declan Shalvey, Joshua Cassara, Greg Land, Kev Walker, Chris Bachalo, Jesus Saiz, Paulo Siqueira, Leonard Kirk (A)	
2020	X-Men/Fantastic Four vol. 2	1–4	Chip Zdarsky (W) Dexter Vines, Karl Story, Terry Dodson, Ransom Getty (A)	
2020	X-Men: God Loves, Man Kills Extended Cut	1–2	Chris Claremont (W) Brent Anderson (A)	
2021	Deadpool: Black, White and Blood	1–5	Tom Taylor (W)	
2021	Inferno vol. 2	1–4	Jonathan Hickman (W) Valerio Schiti, R.B. Silva, Stefano Caselli (A)	
2021	X-Men: The Trial of Magneto	1–5	Leah Williams (W) Lucas Werneck (A)	
2022	Sabretooth vol. 4	1–5	Victor LaValle (W) Leonard Kirk (A)	
2022	Devil's Reign: X-Men	1–3	Gerry Duggan (W) Phil Noto (A)	part of Devil's Reign
2022	X Lives of Wolverine	1–5	Benjamin Percy (W) Joshua Cassara (A)	
2022	X Deaths of Wolverine	1–5	Benjamin Percy (W) Federico Vincentini (A)	
2022	Wolverine: Patch	1–5	Larry Hama (W) Andrea Di Vito (A)	
2022	Deadpool: Bad Blood	1–4	Rob Liefeld, Chris Sims, Chad Bowers (W) Rob Liefeld (A)	serialized version of the Original Graphic Novel
2022	X-Men '92: House of XCII	1–5	Steve Foxe (W) Salva Espin (A)	
2022	X-Men Unlimited: X-Men Green	1–2	Gerry Duggan (W) Emilio Laiso (A)	collects X-Men Unlimited Infinity Comic #5–12
2022	Gambit vol. 6	1–5	Chris Claremont (W) Sid Kotian (A)	
2022	A.X.E.: Judgment Day	1–6	Kieron Gillen (W) Valerio Schiti (A)	
2022	A.X.E.: Death to the Mutants	1–3	Kieron Gillen (W) Guiu Vilanova (A)	part of Judgment Day
2022	X-Terminators vol. 2	1–5	Leah Williams (W) Carlos E. Gomez (A)	
2022	X-Treme X-Men vol. 3	1–5	Chris Claremont (W) Salvador Larroca (A)	
2022	Sabretooth and the Exiles	1–5	Victor LaValle (W) Leonard Kirk (A)	
2022	Dark Web: X-Men	1–3	Gerry Duggan (W) Rod Reis (A)	part of Dark Web
2023	Storm & the Brotherhood of Mutants	1–3	Al Ewing (W) Paco Medina, Patch Zircher, Alessandro Vitti (A)	part of Sins of Sinister
2023	Nightcrawlers	1–3	Si Spurrier (W) Paco Medina, Patch Zircher, Alessandro Vitti (A)	part of Sins of Sinister
2023	Immoral X-Men	1–3	Kieron Gillen (W) Paco Medina, Patch Zircher, Alessandro Vitti (A)	part of Sins of Sinister
2023	Bishop: War College	1–5	J. Holtham (W) Sean Damien Hill (A)	
2023	Rogue & Gambit vol. 2	1–5	Stephanie Phillips (W) Carlos Gomez (A)	
2023	X-23: Deadly Regenesis	1–5	Erica Schultz (W) Edgar Salazar (A)	
2023	Deadpool: Badder Blood	1–5	Rob Liefeld (W/A)	
2023	X-Cellent vol. 2	1–5	Peter Milligan (W) Michael Allred & Laura Allred (A)	
2023	New Mutants Lethal Legion	1–5	Charlie Jane Anders (W) Enid Balám (A)	
2023	Storm vol. 4	1–5	Ann Nocenti (W) Sid Kotian (A)	
2023	X-Men: Days of Future Past - Doomsday	1–4	Marc Guggenheim (W) Manuel García (A)	
2023	Alpha Flight vol. 5	1–5	Ed Brisson (W) Scott Godlewski (A)	
2023	Astonishing Iceman	1–5	Steve Orlando (W) Vincenzo Carratù (A)	part of Fall of X
2023	Children of the Vault	1–4	Deniz Camp (W) Luca Maresca (A)	part of Fall of X
2023	Dark X-Men vol. 2	1–5	Steve Foxe (W) Jonas Scharf (A)	part of Fall of X
2023	Jean Grey vol. 2	1–4	Louise Simonson (W) Bernard Chang (A)	part of Fall of X
2023	Ms. Marvel: The New Mutant	1–4	Sabir Pirzada & Iman Vellani (W) Carlos Gomez & Adam Gorham (A)	part of Fall of X
2023	Realm of X	1–4	Torunn Grønbekk (W) Diógenes Neves (A)	part of Fall of X
2023	Uncanny Spider-Man	1–5	Si Spurrier (W) Lee Garbett (A)	part of Fall of X
2024	Cable vol. 5	1–4	Fabian Nicieza (W) Scot Eaton (A)	part of Fall of X
2024	Dazzler vol. 2	1–4	Jason Loo (W) Rafael Loureiro (A)	
2024	Dead X-Men	1–4	Steve Foxe (W) Vincenzo Carratù, Bernard Chang & Jonas Scharf (A)	part of Fall of X
2024	Deadpool & Wolverine: WWIII	1–3	Joe Kelly (W) Adam Kubert (A)	
2024	Fall of the House of X	1–5	Gerry Duggan (W) Lucas Werneck (A)	part of Fall of X
2024	Ms. Marvel: Mutant Menace	1–4	Sabir Pirzada & Iman Vellani (W) Scott Godlewski (A)	part of Fall of the House of X
2024	Mystique vol. 2	1–5	Declan Shalvey (W/A)	
2024	Resurrection of Magneto	1–4	Al Ewing (W) Luciano Vecchio (A)	part of Fall of X
2024	Rise of the Powers of X	1–5	Kieron Gillen (W) R.B. Silva (A)	part of Fall of X
2024	Sabretooth: The Dead Don't Talk	1–5	Frank Tieri (W) Michael Sta. Maria (A)	
2024	Sentinels	1–5	Alex Paknadel (W) Justin Mason (A)	
2024	Venom War: Wolverine	1–3	Tim Seeley & Tony Fleecs (W) Kev Walker (A)	part of Venom War
2024	Venom War: Deadpool	1–3	Sabir Pirzada (W) Luca Maresca (A)	part of Venom War
2024	Wolverine: Blood Hunt	1–4	Tom Waltz (W) Juan José Ryp (A)	part of Blood Hunt
2024	Wolverine: Deep Cuts	1–4	Chris Claremont (W) Edgar Salazar (A)	
2024	Wolverine: Madripoor Knights	1–5	Chris Claremont (W) Edgar Salazar (A)	sequel to Uncanny X-Men #268
2024	Wolverine: Revenge	1–5	Jonathan Hickman (W) Greg Capullo (A)	
2024	Weapon X-Men	1–4	Christos Gage (W) Yıldıray Çınar (A)	spinoff from The Original X-Men one-shot
2024	X-Men '97	1–4	Steve Foxe (W) Salvador Espin (A)	
2024	Hellverine vol. 1	1–4	Benjamin Percy (W) Julius Ohta (A)	spinoff from the Ghost Rider/Wolverine: Weapons of Vengeance Alpha one-shot
2024	X-Men: Forever	1–4	Kieron Gillen (W) Luca Maresca (A)	part of Fall of X
2024	X-Men: Heir of Apocalypse	1–4	Steve Foxe (W) Netho Diaz (A)	
2025	Cable: Love and Chrome	1–5	David Pepose (W) Mike Henderson (A)	
2025	Emma Frost: The White Queen	1–5	Amy Chu (W) Andrea Di Vito (A)	
2025	Rogue: The Savage Land	1–5	Tim Seeley (W) Zulema Lavina (A)	
2025	Wolverine and Kitty Pryde	1–5	Chris Claremont (W) Damian Couceiro (A)	
2025	Wolverines and Deadpools	1–3	Cody Ziglar (W) Rogê Antônio(A)	
2025	X-Men of Apocalypse	1–4	Jeph Loeb (W) Simone Di Meo (A)	
2025	Amazing X-Men vol. 3	1–3	Jed MacKay (W) Mahmud Asrar (A)	part of Age of Revelation
2025	Binary	1–3	Stephanie Phillips (W) Giada Belviso (A)	part of Age of Revelation
2025	Laura Kinney: Sabretooth	1–3	Erica Schultz (W) Valentina Pinti (A)	part of Age of Revelation
2025	Longshots	1–3	Gerry Duggan & Jonathan Hickman (W) Alan Robinson (A)	part of Age of Revelation
2025	Unbreakable X-Men	1–3	Gail Simone (W) Lucas Werneck (A)	part of Age of Revelation
2025	Rogue Storm	1–3	Murewa Ayodele (W) Roland Boschi (A)	part of Age of Revelation
2025	Iron & Frost	1–3	Cavan Scott (W) Ruairí Coleman (A)	part of Age of Revelation
2025	Sinister's Six	1–3	David Marquez (W) Rafael Loureiro (A)	part of Age of Revelation
2025	The Last Wolverine	1–3	Saladin Ahmed (W) Edgar Salazar (A)	part of Age of Revelation
2025	Omega Kids	1–3	Tony Fleecs (W) Andrés Genolet (A)	part of Age of Revelation
2025	Radioactive Spider-Man	1–3	Joe Kelly (W) Kev Walker (A)	part of Age of Revelation
2025	X-Men: Book of Revelation	1–3	Jed MacKay (W) Netho Diaz (A)	part of Age of Revelation
2025	Cloak or Dagger	1–3	Justina Ireland (W) Lorenzo Tammetta (A)	part of Age of Revelation
2025	Expatriate X-Men	1–3	Eve L. Ewing (W) Francesco Mortarino (A)	part of Age of Revelation
2025	Undeadpool	1–3	Tim Seeley (W) Carlos Magno (A)	part of Age of Revelation
2025	X-Vengers	1–3	Jason Loo (W) Sergio Dávila (A)	part of Age of Revelation
2026	Logan: Black, White & Blood	1–4	Tom Waltz (W) Alex Lins (A)	
2026	Wolverine: Weapons of Armageddon	1–4	Chip Zdarsky (W) Luca Maresca (A)	
2026	Sai: Dimensional Rivals	1–5	Peach Momoko (W/A) Iban Coello (W/A) Stan Sakai Penciler (W/A)	
2026	Cyclops vol. 4	1–5	Alex Paknadel (W) Rogê Antônio (A)	part of Shadows of Tomorrow
2026	Magik & Colossus	1–5	Ashley Allen (W) Germán Peralta (A)	part of Shadows of Tomorrow
2026	Rogue vol. 4	1–5	Erica Schultz (W) Luigi Zacharia (A)	part of Shadows of Tomorrow
2026	Storm: Earth's Mightiest Mutant	1–5	Murewa Ayodele (W) Federica Mancin (A)	part of Shadows of Tomorrow
2026	Moonstar	1–5	Ashley Allen (W) Edoardo Audino (A)	part of Shadows of Tomorrow
2026	X-Men Outback	1–5	Steve Orlando (W) Stephen Segovia (A)	
2026	Bishop	1–5	Saladin Ahmed (W) Mario Santoro (A)	
2026	X-Men '97: Season Two	1–5	Steve Foxe (W) Salva Espin (A)	
2026	Gambit: Wanted	1–5	Chris Claremont (W) Robert Gill (A)	
2026	DNX	1–5	Jed MacKay (W) Federico Vicentini (A)	crossover with the Fantastic Four
2026	Tomb of Apocalypse	1–5	Ashley Allen (W) Domenico Carbone (A)	
2026	Wolverine: Paradise	1–5	Dan Panosian (W/A)	
2026	X-Orcists	1–5	Ashley Allen (W) Germán Peralta (A)	
2026	Jean Grey	1–5	Jed MacKay (W) Rogê Antônio (A)	
2026	Wolverine: Origin III – The Dark Age	1–4	Paul Jenkins (W) CAFU (A)	
2026	Fugitive X-Force	1–5	Tim Seeley (W) Áthila Fabbio (A)	

== One-shots ==
=== 0–9 ===
- 100th Anniversary Special: X-Men (2014)

=== A ===
- A-Babies vs X-Babies (2012)
- Age of Apocalypse: The Chosen (1995)
- Age of X Alpha (2011)
- Age of X-Man: Alpha (2019)
- Age of X-Man: Omega (2019)
- All-New Exiles vs. X-Men (1995)
- All-New Wolverine Saga (2010)
- All-New X-Men Special (2013)
- Alpha Flight Special vol. 2 (1992)
- Alpha Flight: True North (2019)
- Amazing Spider-Man and the X-Men in Arcade's Revenge (1992)
- Amazon (1996) – Amalgam Comics title
- Archangel (1996)
- Astonishing Spider-Man & Wolverine: Another Fine Mess (2011) – collects Astonishing Spider-Man & Wolverine #1-3
- Astonishing X-Men Saga (2006)
- Astonishing X-Men Sketchbook (2008)
- Astonishing X-Men/Amazing Spider-Man: The Gauntlet Sketchbook (2009)
- Avengers & X-Men: Time Trouble (2006) – title on the cover is The New Avengers
- Avengers vs X-Men Program (2012)
- A.X.E.: Eve of Judgment (2022)
- A.X.E.: Judgment Day Omega (2022)
- A.X.E.: X-Men (2022)

=== B ===
- Baby's First Deadpool Book (1998)
- Badrock/Wolverine (1996)
- Be X-Tra Safe with the X-Men (1996)
- Black Knight: Exodus (1996)

=== C ===
- Cable: Reloaded (2021)
- Captain Universe/X-23 (2006) – "Chapter 3 in a 5-Part Epic"
- Cerebro's Guide to the X-Men (1997)
- Chaos War: Alpha Flight (2011)
- Colossus (1997)
- Cyberforce/X-Men (2007)
- Cyclops vol. 2 (2011)

=== D ===
- Daken: Dark Wolverine - Empire (2011) – collects Daken: Dark Wolverine #1-3
- Dark Avengers/Uncanny X-Men: Exodus (2009)
- Dark Avengers/Uncanny X-Men: Utopia (2009)
- Dark Claw Adventures (1997) – Amalgam Comics title
- Dark Reign: The List - Wolverine (2009)
- Dark Reign: The List - X-Men (2009)
- Dark X-Men: The Confession (2009)
- Darkness/Wolverine (2006)
- Dazzler (2010)
- Dazzler: X-Song (2018)
- Deadpool #0 (1998) Wizard #0 comic
- Deadpool & Cable (#26) (2011)
- Deadpool #1,000 (2010)
- Deadpool #900 (2009)
- Deadpool Bi-Annual (2014)
- Deadpool Corps: Rank and Foul (2010)
- Deadpool Family (2011)
- Deadpool Max X-Mas Special (2012)
- Deadpool Max: A History of Violence (2011)
- Deadpool/GLI - Summer Fun Spectacular (2007)
- Deadpool Role-plays the Marvel Universe (2024)
- Deadpool Team-Up vol. 1 (1998)Deadpool: Games of Death (2009)
- Deadpool/Wolverine: Weapon X-Traction (2024)
- Deadpool: April Pools Day (2026)
- Deadpool: Last Days of Magic (2016)
- Deadpool: The Gauntlet (2014)
- Deadpool: Seven Slaughters (2023)
- Death of Doctor Strange: Black Knight/X-Men (2022)
- Death of Wolverine: Captain America and Deadpool (2014)
- Death of Wolverine: Life After Logan (2014)
- Decimation: House of M—The Day After (2006)
- Demon Days: Blood Feud (2022)
- Demon Days: Cursed Web (2021)
- Demon Days: Mariko (2021)
- Demon Days: Rising Storm (2021)
- Demon Days: X-Men (2021)

=== E ===
- Encyclopedia Deadpoolica (1998)
- Excalibur Special Edition (1988)
- Excalibur: Air Apparent (1991)
- Excalibur: Mojo Mayhem (1989)
- Excalibur: The Possession (1991)
- Excalibur: XX Crossing (1991)
- Exiles: Days of Then and Now (2008)

=== F ===
- Firestar vol. 2 (2010)
- Free Comic Book Day 2003: Ultimate X-Men (2003)
- Free Comic Book Day 2006: X-Men & Runaways (2006)
- Free Comic Book Day 2008: X-Men (2008)
- Free Comic Book Day 2009: Wolverine: Origin of an X-Man (2009)
- Free Comic Book Day 2020: X-Men (2020)
- Free Comic Book Day 2022: Avengers/X-Men (2022)

=== G ===
- Gambit 1/2 (sometimes listed as 0.5) (1999) – Wizard mail-away exclusive
- Gambit & Bishop: Genesis (2001)
- Gambit and the Champions: From the Marvel Vault (2011)
- Gambit and Bishop: Alpha (2001)
- Generation Hex #1 (1997) – Amalgam Comics title
- Generation X #1/2 (sometimes listed as #0.5) (1998) – Wizard mail-away exclusive
- Generation X Collector's Preview (1994)
- Generation X Holiday Special (1998)
- Generation X Underground (1998)
- Generation X/Gen^{13} (1997) – this comic also had a 3D edition
- Generation X: Ashcan (1994)
- Ghost Rider and Cable: Servants of the Dead (1991)
- Ghost Rider/Wolverine/Punisher: Heart of Darkness (1991)
- Ghost Rider/Wolverine/Punisher: The Dark Design (1994)
- Giant Size X-Men 40th Anniversary (2015)
- Giant-Size Astonishing X-Men (2008)
- Giant-Size Wolverine (2006)
- Giant-Size X-Men (2024)
- Giant-Size X-Men: Fantomex (2020)
- Giant-Size X-Men: Jean Grey and Emma Frost (2020)
- Giant-Size X-Men: Magneto (2020)
- Giant-Size X-Men: Nightcrawler (2020)
- Giant-Size X-Men: Storm (2020)
- Giant-Size X-Men: Thunderbird (2022)
- Giant-Size X-Men: Tribute To Wein & Cockrum (2020)
- Giant-Sized Gambit (1999)
- Giant-Sized X-Statix (2019)
- Guardians of the Galaxy & X-Men: The Black Vortex Alpha (2015)
- Guardians of the Galaxy & X-Men: The Black Vortex Omega (2015)

=== H ===
- Heroes for Hope Starring the X-Men (1985)
- Heroes Reborn: Magneto and The Mutant Force (2021)
- Heroes Reborn: Weapon X and Final Flight (2021)
- Heroic Age: X-Men (2011)
- Hotshots: X-Men (1995)
- House of M Sketchbook (2005)
- Hunt for Wolverine (2018)
- Hunt for Wolverine: Dead Ends (2018)

=== I ===
- Iceman & Angel (2011)
- Incredible Hulk and Wolverine (1986)

=== J ===
- Jubilee: Deadly Reunion (2026)
- Juggernaut vol. 1 (1997)
- Juggernaut: The Eighth Day (1999)

=== K ===
- King-Size Cable Spectacular (2008)
- King in Black: Marauders (2021)

=== L ===
- Lady Deadpool (2010)
- Legends of the Dark Claw #1 (1996) – Amalgam Comics title
- LEGO Marvel Super Heroes: Guardians of the Galaxy / LEGO Marvel Super Heroes: X-Men (2014) – mini-comic included with the following LEGO Sets: LEGO Guardians of the Galaxy #76019, 76020 & 76021 and LEGO X-Men #76022
- Life of Wolverine (2024)
- Logan: Path of the Warlord (1996)
- Logan: Shadow Society (1996)
- Longshot vol. 2 (1998)

=== M ===
- Magneto and the Magnetic Men (1996) – Amalgam Comics title
- Magneto Ascendant (1999)
- Magneto vol. 1 (1993)
- Magneto vol. 3 (2011)
- Marvel Collector's Edition vol. 2 (1993)
- Marvel Comics Presents the X-Men (1988) – reprints X-Men (1963) #53
- Marvel Girl (2011)
- Marvel Legends: The Beast (2006)
- Marvel Mangaverse: X-Men (2002)
- Marvel Milestone Edition: Giant-Size X-Men (1997) – reprints Giant-Size X-Men #1
- Marvel Milestone Edition: X-Men (3 one-shot issues, 1991, 1993 & 1994) – reprints X-Men vol. 1 (1963) #1, 9 & 28
- Marvel Milestones: Beast & Kitty Pryde (2006) – reprints stories from Amazing Adventures (1970) #11 and Uncanny X-Men (1981) #153
- Marvel Milestones: Onslaught (2006) – reprints Onslaught: Marvel Universe (1996)
- Marvel Milestones: Ultimate Spider-Man, Ultimate X-Men, Microman & Mantor (2006) – reprints Ultimate Spider-Man #1/2, Ultimate X-Men #1/2, and Human Torch vol. 1 #2
- Marvel Milestones: Wolverine, X-Men & Tuk: Caveboy (2005) – reprints Marvel Comics Presents #1, Uncanny X-Men #201 and Captain America Comics #1-2
- Marvel Must Haves: Astonishing X-Men #1–3 (2004)
- Marvel Must Haves: Ultimate X-Men #34–35 (2003)
- Marvel Must Haves: Wolverine #1–3 (2003)
- Marvel Must Haves: Wolverine #20–22 (2004)
- Marvel Must Haves: Ultimate X-Men #1–3 (2003)
- Marvel Spotlight: Deadpool (2009)
- Marvel Spotlight: Heroes Reborn/Onslaught Reborn (2006)
- Marvel Spotlight: New Mutants (2009)
- Marvel Spotlight: Uncanny X-Men - 500 Issues (2008)
- Marvel Spotlight: Wolverine (2009)
- Marvel Spotlight: X-Men - Messiah Complex (2008)
- Marvel Tales: Wolverine (2020)
- Marvel Tales: X-Men (2019)
- Marvel X-Men Collection (3 issues, 1994)
- Marvel & DC Present (1982) – crossover featuring The Uncanny X-Men and The New Teen Titans
- Marvel: Shadows & Light (1997)
- Marvelous Adventures of Gus Beezer: X-Men (2003)
- Marvels Comics: X-Men (2000)
- Marvel's Voices: X-Men (2023)
- Maverick (1997)
- Merry X-Men Holiday Special (2018)
- Ms. Marvel & Wolverine (2022)
- Murderworld: Wolverine (2023)
- Mutant 2099 (2004)
- Mutant X: Dangerous Decisions (2002)
- Mutant X: Origin (2002)
- Mutants vs Ultras: First Encounters (1995)
- Mythos: X-Men (2006)

=== N ===
- New Mutants Saga (2009)
- New Mutants Special Edition (1985)
- New Mutants Summer Special (1990)
- New Mutants: War Children (2019)
- New X-Men: Academy X Yearbook (2005)
- Night Man vs. Wolverine (1995)

=== O ===
- Obnoxio the Clown (1983) – front cover has Obnoxio the Clown vs. the X-Men as the title
- Official Handbook of the Marvel Universe: Wolverine 2004 (2004)
- Official Handbook of the Marvel Universe: X-Men - Age of Apocalypse 2005 (2005)
- Official Handbook of the Marvel Universe: X-Men 2004 (2004)
- Official Handbook of the Marvel Universe: X-Men 2005 (2005)
- Official Handbook of the Ultimate Marvel Universe 2005: The Ultimates & X-Men (2005)
- Onslaught: Epilogue (1997)
- Onslaught: Marvel Universe (1996)
- Onslaught: X-Men (1996)
- The Original X-Men (2023)
- Origins of Marvel Comics: X-Men (2010)

=== P ===
- Phoenix: Resurrection (1996)
- Phoenix: Resurrection - Aftermath (1996)
- Phoenix: Resurrection - Genesis (1995)
- Phoenix: Resurrection - Revelations (1995)
- Phoenix: The Untold Story (1984)
- Pizza Hut Super Savings Book Featuring X-Men (1993) – giveaway item from Pizza Hut restaurants
- Planet-Size X-Men (2021)
- The Pulse: Special Edition—House of M (2005)

=== R ===
- Rampaging Wolverine (2009)

=== S ===
- Sabretooth: Back to Nature (1997)
- Sabretooth: Special (1995)
- Secret X-Men (2022)
- Secrets of the House of M (2005)
- Sentry/X-Men (2001)
- Sins of Sinister (2023)
- Sins of Sinister: Dominion (2023)
- Special Edition X-Men (1983) – reprints Giant-Size X-Men #1
- Spider-Man and the New Mutants (1990)
- Spider-Man vs. Wolverine (1987)
- Spider-Man/Punisher/Sabretooth: Designer Genes (1993)
- Spider-Man, Firestar & Iceman (1983)
- Spider-Man, Firestar & Iceman at the Dallas Ballet Nutcracker (1983)
- Spidey/Marrow (2001)
- Star Trek/X-Men (1996)
- Star Trek/X-Men: Second Contact (1998)
- Strong Guy Reborn (1997)
- Stryfe's Strike File (1993)

=== T ===
- Taco Bell/X-Men (2011)
- Tales from the Age of Apocalypse (1996)
- Tales from the Age of Apocalypse: Sinister Bloodlines (1997)
- Target X-Men and Power Pack (2006)
- Target X-Men Encyclopedia (2005)
- Target X-Men: First Class - New Beginnings (2007)
- Team X 2000 (1999)
- Team X/Team 7 (1997)
- The Exciting X-Patrol (1997) – Amalgam Comics title
- The Magnetic Men featuring Magneto (1997) – Amalgam Comics title
- Timeslide (2024)
- Timestorm 2009/2099: X-Men One-Shot (2009) – Timestorm tie-in
- True Believers: Age of Apocalypse (2015)
- True Believers: All-New Wolverine (2017)
- True Believers: Astonishing X-Men #1 (2017)
- True Believers: Cable & The New Mutants #1 (2017)
- True Believers: Deadpool - Deadpool vs. Sabretooth (2016)
- True Believers: Deadpool (2016)
- True Believers: Deadpool - Origins (2016)
- True Believers: Deadpool - The Musical (2016)
- True Believers: Deadpool - The Variants (2016)
- True Believers: Death of Phoenix (2017)
- True Believers: Detective Deadpool (2016)
- True Believers: Enter the Phoenix (2017)
- True Believers: Evil Deadpool (2016)
- True Believers: Extraordinary X-Men - Burning Man (2016)
- True Believers: Generation X #1 (2017)
- True Believers: Giant-Size X-Men #1 (2017)
- True Believers: New Mutants #1 (2017)
- True Believers: Old Man Logan (2015)
- True Believers: Phoenix - Bizarre Adventures (2017)
- True Believers: Phoenix Classic (2017)
- True Believers: Phoenix featuring Cyclops & Marvel Girl (2017)
- True Believers: Phoenix - Origins (2017)
- True Believers: Phoenix Returns (2017)
- True Believers: Phoenix vs. Sabretooth (2017)
- True Believers: Phoenix - The Wedding (2017)
- True Believers: Phoenix - What If? (2017)
- True Believers: The Groovy Deadpool (2016)
- True Believers: The Meaty Deadpool (2016)
- True Believers: The Wedding of Deadpool (2016)
- True Believers: Uncanny Deadpool (2016)
- True Believers: What If Legion Had Killed Magneto? (2018)
- True Believers: Wolverine - Enemy of The State (2017)
- True Believers: Wolverine - Old Man Logan (2017)
- True Believers: Wolverine - Origin (2017)
- True Believers: Wolverine - Weapon X (2017)
- True Believers: Wolverine - X-23 (2017)
- True Believers: Wolverine (2017)
- True Believers: Wolverine and The X-Men (2017)
- True Believers: Wolverine vs. Hulk (2017)
- True Believers: Wolverine: Save the Tiger (2017)
- True Believers: X-Factor - Mutant Genesis #1 (2017)
- True Believers: X-Force #1 (2017)
- True Believers: X-Men #1 (2017)
- True Believers: X-Men – Apocalypse #1 (2019)
- True Believers: X-Men – Besty Braddock #1 (2019)
- True Believers: X-Men – Bishop #1 (2019)
- True Believers: X-Men – Cypher #1 (2020)
- True Believers: X-Men – Empath #1 (2020)
- True Believers: X-Men – Greycrow #1 (2020)
- True Believers: X-Men – Havok #1 (2020)
- True Believers: X-Men – Jubilee #1 (2019)
- True Believers: X-Men – Karima Shapandar, Omega Sentinel #1 (2019)
- True Believers: X-Men – Kitty Pryde & Emma Frost #1 (2019)
- True Believers: X-Men – Kwannon #1 (2019)
- True Believers: X-Men – Magik #1 (2020)
- True Believers: X-Men – Mister Sinister #1 (2020)
- True Believers: X-Men – Moira MacTaggert #1 (2019)
- True Believers: X-Men – Nanny & Orphan Maker #1 (2020)
- True Believers: X-Men – Pyro #1 (2019)
- True Believers: X-Men – Rictor #1 (2019)
- True Believers: X-Men – Saturnyne #1 (2020)
- True Believers: X-Men – Soulsword #1 (2020)
- True Believers: X-Men – Wild Child #1 (2020)
- True Believers: X-Men Blue #1 (2017)
- True Believers: X-Men Gold #1 (2017)
- Typhoid Fever: X-Men #1 (2018)

=== U ===
- Ultimate Comics X-Men Must Have (2012) – reprints Ultimate Comics X-Men #1–3
- Ultimate Spider-Man/Ultimate X-Men vol. 1 (2009)
- Ultimate X-Men #1/2 (sometimes listed as #0.5) (2002) – Wizard mail-away exclusive
- Ultimate X-Men vol. 2 (2001)
- Ultimate X-Men: Collected Edition (2001) – reprints Ultimate X-Men #1–3
- Ultimatum: X-Men Requiem (2009)
- Uncanny X-Force: Apocalypse Solution (2011)
- Uncanny X-Men at the State Fair of Texas (1983)
- Uncanny X-Men Special (2014)
- Uncanny X-Men Winter Special (UK) (1981) – Marvel UK comic
- Uncanny X-Men: First Class Giant-Sized Special (2009)
- Uncanny X-Men: NFL Pro Action Giveaway Insert Comic (1994)
- Uncanny X-Men: The Heroic Age (2010)
- Uncanny X-Men: Winter's End (2019)

=== W ===
- Wakanda Forever: X-Men (2018)
- Wastelanders: Wolverine (2021)
- Weapon X #1/2 (sometimes listed as #0.5) (2002) – Wizard mail-away exclusive
- Weapon X Noir (2010)
- Weapon X: The Draft - Agent Zero (2002)
- Weapon X: The Draft - Kane (2002)
- Weapon X: The Draft - Marrow (2002)
- Weapon X: The Draft - Sauron (2002)
- Weapon X: The Draft - Wild Child (2002)
- Weapons of Mutant Destruction: Alpha (2017)
- What If? Magik (2018)
- What If? X-Men (2018)
- What If...? Uncanny X-Men (2026)
- What If...? X-Men (2026)
- WildC.A.T.s/X-Men: The Dark Age (1998) – this comic was also printed in 3D
- WildC.A.T.s/X-Men: The Golden Age (1997) – this comic was also printed in 3D
- WildC.A.T.s/X-Men: The Modern Age (1997) – this comic was also printed in 3D
- WildC.A.T.s/X-Men: The Silver Age (1997) – this comic was also printed in 3D
- Witchblade/Wolverine (2004)
- Wizard X-Men Pre-Press Edition (2001)
- Wolverine #1/2 (sometimes listed as #0.5) (1997) – Wizard mail-away exclusive
- Wolverine and Captain America: Weapon Plus (2019)
- Wolverine and Ghost Rider in Acts of Vengeance (1993)
- Wolverine Art Appreciation (2009)
- Wolverine Battles the Incredible Hulk (1989)
- Wolverine Comic Reader (2013) – reprints Wolverine: First Class #2 and material from Wolverine and Power Pack #1
- Wolverine Halloween Special Edition (1993)
- Wolverine Saga vol. 2 (2009)
- Wolverine Special: Firebreak One-Shot (2008)
- Wolverine vs. Blade (2019)
- Wolverine vs. Spider-Man (1995)
- Wolverine and Cable: Guts & Glory (1999)
- Wolverine/Nick Fury: Scorpio Rising (1994)
- Wolverine/Cable (1999)
- Wolverine/Deadpool: The Decoy (2011)
- Wolverine/Ghost Rider: Weapons of Vengeance Alpha (2023)
- Wolverine/Ghost Rider: Weapons of Vengeance Omega (2023)
- Wolverine/Shi: Dark Night of Judgment (2000)
- Wolverine: Best There Is - Contagion (2011) – collects Wolverine: The Best There Is #1-6
- Wolverine: Black Rio (1998)
- Wolverine: Bloodlust (1990)
- Wolverine: Bloody Choices (1993)
- Wolverine: Carni-Brawl (2010) – this is a digital comic
- Wolverine: Chop Shop (2008)
- Wolverine: Danger on the Docks (1993) – #2 of Drake's Cakes four-issue series of mini-comics.
- Wolverine: Dangerous Games (2008)
- Wolverine: Debt of Death (2011)
- Wolverine: Doombringer (1997)
- Wolverine: Evilution (1994)
- Wolverine: Exit Wounds (2019)
- Wolverine: Flies to a Spider (2008)
- Wolverine: Giant-Size Old Man Logan (2009)
- Wolverine: Global Jeopardy (1993)
- Wolverine: In the Flesh (2013)
- Wolverine: Inner Fury (1992)
- Wolverine: Killing Made Simple (2008)
- Wolverine: Killing (1993)
- Wolverine: Knight of Terra (1995)
- Wolverine: Mr. X (2010)
- Wolverine: Rahne of Terra (1992)
- Wolverine: Revolver (2009)
- Wolverine: Road to Hell (2010)
- Wolverine: Saudade (2008)
- Wolverine: Savage (2010)
- Wolverine: Save the Tiger! (1992)
- Wolverine: Son of Canada (2001)
- Wolverine: Switchback (2009)
- Wolverine: The Amazing Immortal Man and Other Bloody Tales (2008)
- Wolverine: The Anniversary (2009)
- Wolverine: The Jungle Adventure (1990)
- Wolverine: The Nuke Hunters (1994) – #4 in a five-issue mini-comic series giveaway by Drake's Cakes
- Wolverine: Under the Boardwalk (2009)
- Wolverine: Weapon X Files (2009)
- Wolverine: Wendigo (2010)
- Wolverine: Wolverine Goes to Hell (2011) – reprints Wolverine #1–3
- World of Revelation (2025) – part of Age of Revelation

=== X ===
- X-23 vol 2. (2010)
- X-23: The Killing Dream (2011) – collects X-23 vol. 3 #1–3
- Xavier Institute Alumni Yearbook (1996)
- X-Babies: Murderama (1998)
- X-Babies: Reborn (2000)
- X-Factor Special: Layla Miller (2008)
- X-Factor: Prisoner of Love (1990)
- X-Factor: The Quick and the Dead (2008)
- X-Force & Spider-Man: Sabotage (1992)
- X-Force Megazine (1996)
- X-Force Special: Ain't No Dog (2009)
- X-Force/Cable: Messiah War (2009)
- X-Force/Youngblood (1996) – second part of a two-part crossover; Part 1 is: Youngblood/X-Force
- X-Force: Legacy of Vengeance (2008)
- X-Force: Killshot (2021)
- X-Man: All Saints Day (1997)
- X-Men #1/2 (Sometimes listed as #0.5) (1998) – Wizard mail-away exclusive
- X-Men 2 Movie (2003)
- X-Men 2 Prequel: Nightcrawler (2003)
- X-Men 2 Prequel: Wolverine (2003)
- X-Men 2099 Special (1995)
- X-Men 2099: Oasis (1996)
- X-Men Alpha (1995)
- X-Men and Captain Universe: Sleeping Giants (1994) – this was a mail-away custom comic where your name was printed in the comic
- X-Men and Moon Girl (2022)
- X-Men Animation Special: The Pryde of the X-Men (1990)
- X-Men Archives Sketchbook (2000)
- X-Men Black: Emma Frost (2018)
- X-Men Black: Juggernaut (2018)
- X-Men Black: Magneto (2018)
- X-Men Black: Mojo (2018)
- X-Men Black: Mystique (2018)
- X-Men Blue: Origins (2023)
- X-Men Easter Special (UK) (1992) Marvel UK comic
- X-Men Evolutions (2011)
- X-Men First Class Magazine (2011)
- X-Men Firsts (1996)
- X-Men Forever Giant-Size (2010)
- X-Men Giant-Size (2011)
- X-Men iConnect Edition (2001) – free comic sent to new subscribers of Marvel's ISP "marvelonline.net"
- X-Men Interactive Comic Book (1996)
- X-Men Legends II: Rise of Apocalypse (2005)
- X-Men Movie Adaptation (2000)
- X-Men Movie Prequel: Magneto (2000)
- X-Men Movie Prequel: Rogue (2000)
- X-Men Movie Prequel: Wolverine (2000)
- X-Men Movie Special Edition (2000)
- X-Men Movie Special Premiere Prequel Edition (2000)
- X-Men Mutant Search R.U. 1? (1998)
- X-Men Omega (1995)
- X-Men Origins: Beast (2008)
- X-Men Origins: Colossus (2008)
- X-Men Origins: Cyclops (2010)
- X-Men Origins: Deadpool (2010)
- X-Men Origins: Emma Frost (2010)
- X-Men Origins: Gambit (2009)
- X-Men Origins: Iceman (2010)
- X-Men Origins: Jean Grey (2008)
- X-Men Origins: Nightcrawler (2010)
- X-Men Origins: Sabretooth (2009)
- X-Men Origins: Wolverine (2009)
- X-Men Prelude to Perdition (1995)
- X-Men Premium Edition (1993) – Toys R Us promo comic
- X-Men Prime (1995)
- X-Men Revolution Genesis Edition (2000)
- X-Men Seventy-Five Cent Ashcan Edition (1994)
- X-Men Spotlight (2011)
- X-Men Spring Special (UK) (1994) Marvel UK comic
- X-Men Summer Special (UK) (1995) Marvel UK comic
- X-Men the Movie Special Edition (2000)
- X-Men Ultra III Preview (1995)
- X-Men Universe: Past, Present and Future (1999)
- X-Men Unlimited: Latitude (2022) – collects X-Men Unlimited Infinity Comics #1–4
- X-Men vs. Dracula (1993)
- X-Men vs. Hulk (2009)
- X-Men Yearbook 1999 (2000)
- X-Men/Alpha Flight: The Gift (1998)
- X-Men: Age of Apocalypse One-Shot (2005)
- X-Men: Age of Revelation Overture (2025)
- X-Men: Age of Revelation Finale (2025)
- X-Men: Ashcan (1994)
- X-Men: Before The Fall – The Heralds of Apocalypse (2023)
- X-Men: Before The Fall – Mutants' First Strike (2023)
- X-Men: Before The Fall – The Sinister Four (2023)
- X-Men: Before The Fall – Sons of X (2023)
- X-Men: Blind Science (2010)
- X-Men: Blood Hunt – Jubilee (2024)
- X-Men: Blood Hunt – Laura Kinney The Wolverine (2024)
- X-Men: Blood Hunt – Magik (2024)
- X-Men: Blood Hunt – Psylocke (2024)
- X-Men: Books of Askani (1995)
- X-Men: Children of the Atom vol. 2 (2005) – reprints X-Men (1963) #1–3
- X-Men: Curse of the Man-Thing (2021)
- X-Men: Curse of the Mutants - Blade (2010)
- X-Men: Curse of the Mutants - Smoke and Blood (2010)
- X-Men: Curse of the Mutants - Storm & Gambit (2010)
- X-Men: Curse of the Mutants Saga (2010)
- X-Men: Curse of the Mutants Spotlight (2011)
- X-Men: Declassified (2000)
- X-Men: Demons and Death (2025) – collects X-Men from the Ashes Infinity Comics #7–12
- X-Men: Earthfall (1996)
- X-Men: Earth's Mutant Heroes (2011)
- X-Men: Endangered Species (2007)
- X-Men: Evolution vol. 2 (2002) – reprints X-Men: Evolution #1-2
- X-Men: First Class Giant-Size Special (2008)
- X-Men: First Class Special (2007)
- X-Men: Future History - The Messiah War Sourcebook (2009)
- X-Men: Gold (2013)
- X-Men: Halloween Special Edition (1993)
- X-Men: Hellfire Gala (2022)
- X-Men: Hellfire Gala (2023)
- X-Men: Hellfire Murder (2026)
- X-Men: Hellfire Vigil (2025)
- X-Men: Hope (2010)
- X-Men: Life Lessons (2003)
- X-Men: Manifest Destiny - Nightcrawler (2009)
- X-Men: Marvel Snapshots (2020)
- X-Men: Messiah Complex - Mutant Files (2008)
- X-Men: NFL Pro Action Giveaway Insert Comic (1994) – issue is #2, issues #1 & #3 are Spider-Man Insert Comics
- X-Men: Odd Men Out (2008)
- X-Men: The Onslaught Revelation (2021)
- X-Men: Original Sin (2008)
- X-Men: Phoenix Force Handbook (2010)
- X-Men: Pixies and Demons Director's Cut (2008)
- X-Men: Prelude to Future Past (2025)
- X-Men: Regenesis (2011)
- X-Men: Return of Magik Must Have (2008)
- X-Men: Road to Onslaught (1996)
- X-Men: Siege and Destroy (1994) – Part 5 in a five-part Drake's Cakes giveaway
- X-Men: Survival Guide to the Mansion (1993)
- X-Men: Sword of the Braddocks (2009)
- X-Men: Tales from the Age of Apocalypse (2025) – collects Astonishing X-Men #1, Factor X #1, Weapon X #1 and Astonishing X-Men #1
- X-Men: The 198 Files (2006)
- X-Men: The Coming Of Triplikill (1994)
- X-Men: The Exterminated (2018)
- X-Men: The Magneto War (1999)
- X-Men: The Onslaught Revelation (2021)
- X-Men: The Undertow (2025) – collects X-Men from the Ashes Infinity Comics #19–25
- X-Men: The Wedding Album (1994)
- X-Men: The Wedding Special (2018)
- X-Men: The Wedding Special (2024) – Marvel Voices Pride Special
- X-Men: Tooth and Claw (2025) – collects X-Men from the Ashes Infinity Comics #13–18
- X-Men: Unforgiven (2022)
- X-Men: With Great Power (2011)
- X-Men: Wrath of Apocalypse (1996)
- X-Men: Xavier's Secret (2025) – collects X-Men from the Ashes Infinity Comics #1–6
- X-Men: Year of the Mutants Collector's Preview (1995)
- X-Men of Apocalypse Alpha (2025)
- X-Patrol (1996) – Amalgam Comics title
- X-Women (2010)
- X of Swords: Creation (2020)
- X of Swords: Destruction (2020)
- X of Swords: Stasis (2020)
- X of Swords Handbook (2020)

=== Y ===
- Youngblood/X-Force (1996) – first part of a two-part crossover; Part 2 is: X-Force/Youngblood

== See also ==
- List of Marvel Comics publications
- List of X-Men comics
