= Kelly Thompson =

American novelist and comic book writer

- Education: Savannah College of Art and Design
- Occupations: Author; comic book writer; comics critic
- Years active: 2009–present
- Notable work: Hawkeye; A-Force; Jessica Jones; Captain Marvel; Rogue & Gambit; West Coast Avengers; X-Men; Mr. & Mrs. X It's Jeff! Absolute Wonder Woman
- Awards: Eisner Award
- Website: 1979semifinalist.com

Kelly Thompson is an American writer of novels and comic books. She is best known for the Jem and the Holograms comic with co-creator and artist Sophie Campbell, a modern re-imagining of the 1980s series of the same name; the Eisner-nominated Marvel comic Hawkeye with artist Leonardo Romero, which stars Kate Bishop; and Captain Marvel featuring Carol Danvers with artist Carmen Carnero and colorist Tamra Bonvillain. Her other works include the novel The Girl Who Would Be King and comic series A-Force (vol. 2), West Coast Avengers (vol. 3), Jessica Jones (vol. 2), Mr. & Mrs. X (vol. 1), and Black Widow (vol. 8).

She is also the co-creator of the character Jeff the Land Shark and writer of his digital Infinity Comics series It's Jeff!.

Thompson has won three Eisner Awards – Best New Series for Black Widow (vol. 8) in 2021, Best Humor Publication for It's Jeff: The Jeff-Verse in 2024, and Best New Series for Absolute Wonder Woman in 2025.

== Early life ==
Thompson stated she had "been writing in some way shape or form for about as long as [she] can remember." Thompson graduated from the Savannah College of Art and Design with a degree in Sequential Art.

== Comics career ==
What is life but laughing and crying? It's what we got [...] I want to lighten things up with jokes because I want to make you laugh and then I want to break your heart and then I want to make you laugh again.

— Kelly Thompson, 2016 interview with Vox

=== CBR ===
Thompson got her start in the comics industry as staff writer for the website CBR, where she worked from 2009 to 2015 writing reviews and She Has No Head!, a column centered around women in comics.

=== IDW Publishing ===
In 2014, IDW Publishing announced Thompson would write their new Jem and the Holograms comic with artist Sophie Campbell, a modern re-imagining of the animated series. Thompson wrote the comic for two years, with the first issue released in March 2015 and concluding with issue #26 on June 14, 2017.

=== Marvel Comics ===
During the 2015 "Secret Wars" storyline, Thompson co-wrote her first Marvel comic, a four issue tie-in series titled Captain Marvel and the Carol Corps with Kelly Sue DeConnick. She also wrote the solo series of Kate Bishop, the second Hawkeye. It followed Bishop, who opened her own detective company on the west coast of the United States. For her work on Hawkeye, Thompson was nominated for an Eisner for best continuing series in 2018. The series was cancelled by Marvel after 16 issues in 2018.

In January 2018, Marvel Comics announced it had signed Thompson to an exclusive contract. That same month, the first issue of Thompson's Rogue & Gambit was released, which had been announced ahead of New York Comic Con 2017. It followed Rogue and Gambit, who reignite their relationship while investigating the disappearance of mutants at a vacation resort. Following the success of Rogue & Gambit, Thompson wrote the series Mr. and Mrs. X about Rogue and Gambit as a married couple following their surprise wedding in X-Men Gold #30.

Starting July 2018, Thompson took over Jessica Jones from Brian Michael Bendis. Jessica Jones was the first line of 'digital original'-only titles, which were primarily focused on Marvel characters who have their own television series in the Marvel Cinematic Universe. They were 40-page sized issues released every month over the course of three months, and were later released as physical trade paperbacks. In August 2018, as part of Marvel's Fresh Start relaunch, Thompson wrote the new West Coast Avengers (vol. 3) ongoing series; it ran for ten issues. Thompson and artist Daniele di Nicuolo co-created the character Jeff the Land Shark who first appeared in West Coast Avengers (vol. 3) #7.

In October 2018, Marvel announced Thompson also would write the new ongoing Captain Marvel series featuring Carol Danvers with artist Carmen Carnero and colorist Tamra Bonvillain. The first issue was released on January 9, 2019 and sold more than a hundred thousand copies, Thompson's first comic to reach this milestone.

Thompson was also co-writer of the X-Men storyline "X-Men: Disassembled". In 2019, Thompson wrote the story "Unusual Suspects" for the first issue of the all-female Marvel Fearless anthology, alongside Captain Marvel artist Carnero and colorist Bonvillain. Part of a mini-series created entirely by women, Thompson's contribution focused on Jessica Jones. Thompson was one of the writers on a Spider-Man story called Amazing Spider-Man: Full Circle #1. The comic followed Peter Parker, who goes on a globe-hopping adventure. It was released on October 23, 2019.

Starting in 2020, Thompson wrote the ongoing Black Widow (vol. 8) series with artist Elena Casagrande. The series ran for fifteen issues, ending in 2022.

In 2021, Thompson started to write It's Jeff!, with artists Gurihiru, for Marvel's Infinity Comics. This comedy series, which follows Jeff the Land Shark being raised by Gwen Poole and Kate Bishop, has no dialogue and was released digitally in the vertical scrolling format. A second season of It's Jeff! returned in September 2022, running until January 2023. A third season of It's Jeff! launched on October 20, 2023. The series was later published in a physical format. Thompson is also the writer, with artist Tokitokoro, for the five-issue limited series Jeff The Land Shark (vol. 1), with the first issue released in June 2025.

=== DC Comics ===
In 2023, Thompson announced she would be writing a new Birds of Prey series for DC Comics. In October 2024, she started to write, with artist Hayden Sherman, the ongoing Absolute Wonder Woman series for DC Comics' Absolute Universe (AU) imprint.

=== Other work ===
In 2016, Thompson and Brenden Fletcher wrote a spin-off six-issue Power Rangers mini-series titled Mighty Morphin Power Rangers: Pink for Boom! Studios.The mini-series was focused on the Pink Ranger.

In 2018, Thompson wrote a five-issue Nancy Drew comic miniseries titled Nancy Drew: The Palace of Wisdom, which follows the title character as a 17-year-old girl returning to her old home when she receives a mysterious letter and reuniting with her friends to solve the murders of multiple women. It was published by Dynamite Entertainment. Starting in March 2019, Thompson wrote a five-issue Sabrina the Teenage Witch miniseries for Archie Comics, which concluded in September of that same year. The miniseries was met with critical acclaim and it won 2019's IGN People's Choice award.

In 2021, Thompson launched a deal with Substack to create exclusive comics, such as Black Cloak, with artwork done by her Jem collaborator Meredith McClaren, and The Cull, with art done by Mattia de Lulis. In 2022, it was announced that Black Cloak would receive a print release via Image Comics in January 2023. In May 2023, it was announced that The Cull would also receive a print release via Image, with the first issue set to release August that same year.

In July 2025, Dynamite Entertainment announced that Thompson would write the forthcoming Buffy the Vampire Slayer and Angel comic series.

=== Awards ===
For her work on Hawkeye, Thompson was nominated for an Eisner Award for Best Continuing Series in 2018. A year later, she was nominated for an Eisner Award for Best Writer for her work on Nancy Drew (Dynamite); Hawkeye, Jessica Jones, Mr. & Mrs. X, Rogue & Gambit, Uncanny X-Men and West Coast Avengers (Marvel). In 2021, she won an Eisner Award for Best New Series for her work on Black Widow. Her series It's Jeff! was nominated for Best Digital Comic at the 2022 Eisner Awards.

At the 2024 Eisner Awards, she received the most nominations with being up for five awards, including Best Limited Series, Best New Series, Best Continuing Series, Best Humor Publication and Best Writer. She, with artists Gurihiru, won Best Humor Publication for It's Jeff: The Jeff-Verse #1. In 2025, Thompson was nominated for an Eisner Award for Best Writer for her work on Absolute Wonder Woman, Birds of Prey (DC); Scarlett (Image Skybound); Venom War: It's Jeff #1 (Marvel). Additionally, Absolute Wonder Woman won Best New Series. The first collected edition of Absolute Wonder Woman was nominated for the Hugo Award for Best Graphic Story or Comic in 2026. At the 2026 Eisner Awards, she was nominated for Best Writer for her work on Absolute Wonder Woman, Birds of Prey (DC); Jeff the Land Shark (Marvel). Furthermore, Absolute Wonder Woman was nominated for Best Continuing Series and Jeff the Land Shark was nominated for Best Humor Publication at the Eisner Awards.

=== Activism ===
In June 2019, Thompson joined the Shots Fired project to raise money to combat gun violence. The comic was published by Comicker Press, and was scheduled to be released later that year after a successful Kickstarter funding campaign. The proceeds from the book's sale went to the Coalition to Stop Gun Violence and the Community Justice Reform Coalition.

== Works in other media ==
In 2012, she launched a Kickstarter campaign for her first novel, The Girl Who Would Be King. The crowdfunded campaign reached $26,478, 330% of its original goal, and was released in September of that same year. The story involves two girls with extraordinary powers, one who uses them for good, one for bad, who are about to meet for the first time. In 2014, the novel was optioned for a movie adaptation by Logan Pictures. Thompson told io9, "We had a lot of interest in the book. I think we had at least half a dozen legitimate companies inquiring about the rights. We also had some more intimate interest from writers and smaller producers, a couple film agents also came calling."

== Bibliography ==
=== Books ===
- The Girl Who Would Be King 368 pages, 2012, ISBN 978-0-9882697-3-6
- Storykiller 286 pages, 2014, ISBN 978-0-9916492-5-9

=== Comics ===
==== IDW Publishing ====
- Jem and the Holograms #1-26 (March 2015-June 2017)
  - Volume 1: Showtime (tpb, 152 pages, 2015, ISBN 1-63140-395-8) collects:
    - "Showtime" (with Sophie Campbell, in #1-6, 2015)
  - Volume 2: Viral (tpb, 152 pages, 2016, ISBN 1-63140-579-9) collects:
    - "Viral" (with Emma Vieceli, in #7-9, 2015)
    - "Rio Pacheco Boy Reporter" (with Corin Howell, in #10, 2015)
    - Jem and the Holograms Outrageous Annual 2015 (with among other artist, 2015)
    - Jem and the Holograms Holiday Special (with Amy Mebberson, 2015)
  - Volume 3: Dark Jem (tpb, 136 pages, 2016, ISBN 1-63140-683-3) collects:
    - "Dark Jem" (with Sophie Campbell, in #11-16, 2016)
  - Volume 4: Enter The Stingers (tpb, 152 pages, 2017, ISBN 1-63140-837-2) collects:
    - "Ch-ch-changes" (with Jen Bartel, in #17-18, 2016)
    - "Enter the Stingers" (with Meredith McClaren, in #19-23, 2016-2017)
  - Volume 5: Truly Outrageous (tpb, 124 pages, 2017, ISBN 1-63140-914-X) collects:
    - "Truly Outrageous" (with Gisele Lagace, in #24-26, 2007)
    - Jem and the Holograms Outrageous Annual 2017 (with various artists, 2017)
- Ghostbusters: Deviations, one-shot (with Nelson Daniel, March 2016) collected in Deviations: In a World... Where Everything Changed (tpb, 136 pages, 2016, ISBN 1-63140-675-2)
- Constance & Nano: Engineering Adventure #1, one-shot (with by Nicoletta Baldari, October 2016)
- Jem: The Misfits #1-5 (with Jenn St-Onge, December 2016-June 2017)

==== Image Comics ====
- The Cull #1-5 (August 2023-January 2024)

==== Dark Horse Comics ====
- Creepy #20, "Verto" (with Ramon Bachs, April 2015)
- Heart in a Box (seven-issue limited series with Meredith McClaren, May–July 2015, tpb, 160 pages, 2015, ISBN 1-61655-694-3)

==== Marvel Comics ====
- Captain Marvel and the Carol Corps #1-4 (co-written with Kelly Sue DeConnick, illustrated by David López, Laura Braga, Paolo Pantalena, June–September 2015, collected in Captain Marvel and the Carol Corps, tpb, 120 pages, 2015, ISBN 0-7851-9865-2)
- A-Force vol. 2 #2-10 (February 2016-October 2016)
  - Volume 1: Hypertime (#2-4, co-written with G. Willow Wilson and illustrated by Jorge Molina, tpb, 146 pages, 2016, ISBN 0-7851-9605-6)
  - Volume 2: Rage Against the Dying of the Light (#5-10, illustrated by Ben Caldwell and Paulo Siqueira, tpb, 136 pages, 2017, ISBN 0-7851-9606-4)
- Star Wars Annual vol. 2 #2 (with Emilio Laiso, November 2016)
- Hawkeye vol. 5 #1-16 (November 2016-March 2018)
  - Volume 1: Anchor Points (#1-6, illustrated by Leonardo Romero and Michael Walsh, tpb, 136 pages, 2017, ISBN 1-302-90514-7)
  - Volume 2: Masks (#7-12, illustrated by Leonardo Romero and Michael Walsh, tpb, 136 pages, 2018, ISBN 1-302-90515-5)
  - Volume 3: Family Reunion (#13-16 and Generations: Hawkeye & Hawkeye #1, illustrated by Leonardo Romero and Stefano Raffaele, tpb, 112 pages, 2018, ISBN 1-302-91097-3)
    - Generations: Hawkeye & Hawkeye #1 (with Stefano Raffaele, August 2017) also collected in Generations (hc, 328 pages, 2017, ISBN 1-302-90847-2)
- America #5-6 (July 2017-August 2017)
  - Volume 1: The Life and Times of America Chavez (#5-6, co-written with Gabby Rivera and illustrated by Ramon Villalobos, tpb, 136 pages, 2017, ISBN 978-1302908812)
- Journey to Star Wars: The Last Jedi - Captain Phasma #1-4 (illustrated by Marco Checchetto, September–October 2017) collected in Star Wars: Journey to Star Wars: The Last Jedi - Captain Phasma (tpb, 112 pages, 2017, ISBN 0-7851-9455-X)
- Rogue & Gambit #1-5 (with Pere Pérez, January–May 2018) collected in Rogue & Gambit: Ring of Fire (tpb, 112 pages, 2018, ISBN 1-302-91160-0)
- X-Men: The Wedding Special #1, "Something Old" (with Marika Cresta, May 2018)
- Mr. & Mrs. X #1-12 (July 2018-June 2019)
  - Volume 1: Love And Marriage (#1-6, illustrated by Oscar Bazaldua, tpb, 136 pages, 2019, ISBN 1-302-91351-4)
  - Volume 2: Gambit and Rogue Forever (#7-12, illustrated by Oscar Bazaldua, tpb, 136 pages, 2019, ISBN 1-302-91352-2)
- Jessica Jones (July 2018-May 2019)
  - Volume 1: Blind Spot (#1-3, illustrated by Mattia de Iulis, tpb, 192 pages, 2018, ISBN 1-302-91292-5)
  - Volume 2: Purple Daughter (#1-3, illustrated by Mattia de Iulis, tpb, 136 pages, 2019, ISBN 1-302-91511-8)
- West Coast Avengers (vol. 3) #1-10 (August 2018-April 2019)
  - Volume 1: Best Coast (#1-5, illustrated by Stefano Caselli, tpb, 144 pages, 2019, ISBN 1-302-91345-X)
  - Volume 2: City of Evils (#6-10 illustrated by Daniele di Nicuolo and Gang Hyuk Lim, tpb, 112 pages, 2019, ISBN 1-302-91346-8)
- Uncanny X-Men #1-10 (co-written with Matthew Rosenberg and Ed Brisson, and illustrated by Mahmud Asrar and R. B. Silva, November 2018 - January 2019) collected in Uncanny X-Men: X-Men Disassembled (tpb, 248 pages, 2019, ISBN 1-302-91486-3)
- Merry X-Men Holiday Special #1, "Christmas Cat-Astrophe!" (with David López, December 2018)
- Captain Marvel #1-50 (January 2019-June 2023)
  - Volume 1: Re-Entry (#1-5, illustrated by Carmen Carnero & Annapaola Martello, tpb, 144 pages, 2019, ISBN 1-302-91687-4)
  - Volume 2: Falling Star (#6-11, illustrated by Carmen Carnero & Annapaola Martello, tpb, 136 pages, 2020, ISBN 1-302-91688-2)
  - Volume 3: The Last Avenger (#12-16, illustrated by Lee Garbett, tpb, 112 pages, 2020, ISBN 1-302-92308-0)
  - Volume 4: Accused (#17-21, illustrated by Francesco Manna & Cory Smith, tpb, 2020, ISBN 1-302-92562-8)
  - Volume 5: The New World (#22-26, illustrated by Lee Garbett and Belen Orgeta, tpb, 2021, ISBN 1-302-92595-4)
  - Volume 6: Strange Magic (#27-30, illustrated by David Lopez and Jacopo Camagni, tpb, 2021 ISBN 1-302-92596-2)
  - Volume 7: The Last of the Marvels (#31-36, illustrated by Takeshi Miyazawa and Sergio Davila, tpb, 2022, ISBN 1-302-92884-8)
  - Volume 8: The Trials (#37-41, illustrated by Julius Ohta and Juan Frigeri, tpb, 144 pages, 2022, ISBN 1-302-93264-0)
  - Volume 9: Revenge of the Brood - Part 1 (#42-46, illustrated by Andrea Di Vito, Sergio Davila and Javier Pina, tpb, 112 pages, 2023, ISBN 1-302-94762-1)
  - Volume 10: Revenge of the Brood - Part 2 (#47-50, illustrated by Sergio Davila, David Lopez and Javier Pina, tpb, 112 pages, 2023, ISBN 1-302-94763-X)
- Fearless #1, "Unusual Suspects" (with Carmen Carnero, July 2019)
- Marvel Comics #1000, "Monsters" (with Pepe Larraz, August 2019)
- Amazing Spider-Man: Full Circle #1 (co-written with Jonathan Hickman, Gerry Duggan, Nick Spencer, Al Ewing, Chip Zdarsky, Jason Aaron, October 2019)
- Deadpool #1-10 (November 2019-January 2021)
  - King Deadpool Volume 1: Hail to the King (#1-6, illustrated by Chris Bachalo & Gerardo Sandoval, tpb, 112 pages, 2019, ISBN 1-302-92103-7)
  - King Deadpool Volume 2: (#7-10, illustrated by Gerardo Sandoval, tpb, 112 pages, 2021, ISBN 1-302-92104-5)
  - Deadpool Nerdy 30 #1, "Best There Is" (with Kevin Libranda, March 2021)
- Incoming! #1 (December 2019)
- Star #1-5 (with Javier Pina & Filipe Andrade, January 2020-July 2020) collected in Star: Birth of a Dragon (tpb, 112 pages, 2020, ISBN 1-302-92458-3)
- Captain Marvel: The End #1 (with Carmen Carnero, January 2020)
- Black Widow (vol. 8) #1-15 (September 2020-April 2022)
  - Volume 1: The Ties That Bind (#1-5, illustrated by Elena Casagrande, tpb, 112 pages, 2021, ISBN 1-302-92483-4)
  - Volume 2: I Am the Black Widow (#6-10, illustrated by Elena Casagrande, tpb, 112 pages, 2021, ISBN 1-302-93013-3)
  - Volume 3: Die by the Blade (#11-15, illustrated by Elena Casagrande, tpb, 112 pages, 2022, ISBN 1-302-93254-3)
- Wolverine: Black, White & Blood #4, "The Art of Loss" (with Khary Randolph, March 2021)
- It's Jeff! Infinity Comic #1-present (with Gurihiru, September 2021 – present)
  - It's Jeff! #1 (includes Infinity Comic #1-12, March 2023)
  - Extreme Venomverse #5, "The Rhythm of the Night" (July 2023)
  - It's Jeff!: The Jeff-Verse #1 (includes Infinity Comic #13-24, November 2023)
  - Venom War: It's Jeff! #1 (November 2024)
- The Amazing Spider-Man #75, 77-78, 91-92 (October 2021-March 2022)
  - Beyond Volume 1: (#75, 77-78, illustrated by Travel Foreman, Sara Pichelli, Jim Towe, tpb, 216 pages, 2022, ISBN 1-302-93211-X)
  - Beyond Volume 4: (#91-92, illustrated by Sara Pichelli, Fran Galán, José Carlos Silva, tpb, 168 pages, 2022, ISBN 1-302-93259-4)

==== DC Comics ====
- Harley Quinn: Black, White, and Redder #2 ("Origin Stories for Dummies", with Annie Wu, 2023)
- Birds of Prey #1−Present (September 2023−December 2025)
  - Volume 1: Megadeath (#1−6, illustrated by Leonardo Romero and Arist Deyn, tpb, 160 pages, 2024, ISBN 978-1779525581)
  - Volume 2: Worlds Without End (#7−13, illustrated by Javier Pina and Gavin Guidry, tpb, 176 pages, 2025, ISBN 978-1779528575)
  - Volume 3: Bird Undercover (#14−19, illustrated by Sami Basri and Adriano Lucas, tpb, 176 pages, 2025, ISBN 978-1799501190)
- Absolute Wonder Woman #1−Present (October 2024−Present)
  - Volume 1: The Last Amazon (#1−7, illustrated by Hayden Sherman, tpb, 176 pages, 2025, ISBN 9781799505303)

==== Dynamite Comics ====
- Nancy Drew #1-5 (with Jenn St-Onge, June – October 2018) collected in Nancy Drew: The Palace Of Wisdom (tpb, 128 pages, 2019, ISBN 1-5241-0849-9)
- Buffy the Vampire Slayer #1– (with Stephen Byrne, July 2026–Present)
- Angel #1– (with Giulia Giacomino, August 2026–Present)

==== Boom! Studios ====
- Lumberjanes: Makin' the Ghost of It (with Jen Wang, Christine Norrie and Savanna Ganucheau, May 2016)
- Mighty Morphin Power Rangers: Pink (six-issue limited series with Brenden Fletcher, Tini Howard and Daniele di Nicuolo, June–December 2016, tpb, 160 pages, 2017, ISBN 1-60886-952-0)
- Adventure Time Comics #3 (with other artists, September 2016)
- Mega Princess #1-5 (with Brianne Drouhard, November 2016 - April 2017) collected in Mega Princess (tpb, 128 pages, 2017, ISBN 1-68415-007-8)

==== Archie Comics ====
- Sabrina the Teenage Witch #1-5 (with Veronica Fish, March - September 2019) collected in Sabrina the Teenage Witch (tpb, 144 pages, 2019, ISBN 1-68255-805-3)
