= Rogue: The Savage Land =

2025 Marvel Comics five-issue limited series

- Cover of Rogue: The Savage Land #1 (January 2025). Art by Kaare Andrews.

Publication information
- Publisher: Marvel Comics
- Format: Limited series
- Publication date: March – July 2025
- No. of issues: 5

Creative team
- Written by: Tim Seeley
- Artist(s): Zulema Lavina; Von Randal
- Letterer(s): Ariana Maher; Joe Caramagna
- Colorist: Rachelle Rosenberg
- Editor: Darren Shan

Collected editions
- Rogue: The Savage Land: ISBN 978- 1302964412

Rogue: The Savage Land is a 2025 Marvel Comics five-issue limited series featuring Rogue. The series takes place in the Savage Land during Chris Claremont's run of the X-Men and is written by Tim Seeley with art by Zulema Lavina.

== Publication history ==
The series was first announced in September 2024. It is written by Tim Seeley and features art by Zulema Lavina. Seeley described the writing as "a dream job, and probably the absolute perfect Marvel gig". The fact that the series would feature the controversial Rogue and Magneto partnership, like the X-Men '97 animated series sparked some discussion, though Seeley commented on his social media that the comic would not tie into the show in any way, and there wouldn't be any romance in the story. The covers drawn by Kaare Andrews tries to resemble Jim Lee's X-Men art and feature corner boxes with mini cut-outs of the faces of characters appearing in the issue, as was customary of Marvel Comics during the original Claremont and Lee publications.

== Plot ==
The series serves as a intraquel to Chris Claremont's 1990s storyline of Uncanny X-Men #269 and 274-275, set in the Savage Land where the superhero Rogue and antagonist Magneto briefly sparked something.

== Reception ==
Upon the series announcement ComicBook.com's Jamie Lovett stated that he believed that it was likely created due to the interest around the Magneto-Rogue relationship stirred up by X-Men '97. He also noted that it is an installment of a long line of recent Marvel series that revisit nostalgic periods of the company's history.

The series has a 8.5 rating on the comic book review aggregator website Comic Book Roundup. Joshua Kazemi in his review of the first issue for Comic Book Resources described it as great but with flaws. However, the user rating was 5.5, with some readers criticizing the series for adding nothing to the original story, while others suggested that it relied on nostalgia and variant covers to attract buyers.

== Adaptations ==
This design of Rogue has appeared in Marvel Rivals with the Season 5.5 Love is a Battlefield update as a cosmetic skin.

== Collected editions ==
| Title | Material collected | Publication date | ISBN | Ref |
|---|---|---|---|---|
| Rogue: The Savage Land | Rogue: The Savage Land #1–5, Uncanny X-Men #269, #274 | September 2025 | 978- 1302964412 | |

== See also ==
- List of X-Men limited series and one-shots
