= Rogue & Gambit =

Marvel comic book series

- Cover to Rogue & Gambit #1 by Kris Anka

Publication information
- Publisher: Marvel Comics
- Schedule: Monthly
- Format: Limited series
- Genre: Superhero
- Publication date: (vol. 1); January 2018 – May 2018 (vol. 2); March 2023 – July 2023
- No. of issues: (vol. 1 & 2): 5
- Main character(s): Rogue & Gambit

Creative team
- Written by: (vol. 1); Kelly Thompson (vol. 2); Stephanie Phillips
- Penciller(s): (vol. 1); Pere Perez (vol. 2); Carlos Gomez
- Colorist(s): (vol. 1); Frank D’Armata (vol. 2); David Curiel
- Editor(s): (vol. 1); Darren Shan (vol. 2); Sarah Brunstad

Collected editions
- Ring of Fire: ISBN 978-1302911607
- Power Play: ISBN 978-1302948061

Rogue & Gambit is an American comic book limited series published by Marvel Comics in two volumes. The first volume, created by writer Kelly Thompson and artist Pere Pérez, a five issues released from January to May 2018. In this series, Rogue and Gambit reignite their relationship while investigating the mysterious disappearance of mutants at a vacation resort. This volume draws inspiration from the 90s X-Men comics, particularly in its portrayal of the characters' failed dates.

It was announced at New York Comic Con in October 2017, marking the first miniseries featuring the couple together, despite their previous individual stories. The first issue was released on January 3, 2018. Later, X-Men Gold #30, also written by Thompson, showcased the marriage of Rogue and Gambit, leading to the spin-off series Mr. & Mrs. X.

The second volume, released between May and September 2023, is written by Stephanie Phillips and illustrated by Carlos Gómez. This installment follows Rogue and Gambit as they navigate their complex relationship amid challenges on Krakoa, with Destiny foreseeing a threat that requires Rogue's help, ultimately putting their love and duties to the test.

== Publication history ==
Rogue and Gambit are one of the most popular couples in the X-Men franchise. Their relationship started in 1990, shortly after Gambit was introduced in comic books, and was a strong aspect of the X-Men TV series. Both characters come from the Southern United States and speak in over-the-top accents and slang.

The series was first announced in October 2017 at the New York Comic Con. Although both characters had previously been featured in self-titled comic series individually, this is the first miniseries starring them together. The five-issue limited series was written by Kelly Thompson with art by Pere Perez and covers by Kris Anka. Thompson considers herself a "little bit of an expert" on Rogue and Gambit and relied on editor Darren Shan to tell her when her writing was too steep in old continuity for newer readers to follow. Her primary influence for the series came from issues 4, 8, and 45 of the 1990s comic book X-Men showing failed dates between the characters.

The first issue was released on January 3, 2018. Comic shops ordered about 38,600 copies. By issue 3, orders had fallen to about 18,500. In a pre-release interview, Thompson hoped sales and fan response would be strong enough to warrant an ongoing series starring the characters. A softcover collection of the series is scheduled for release in June 2018 with the subtitle "Ring of Fire".

X-Men Gold #30, also by Thompson, was released some months later. It was advertised as a comic featuring the marriage of Kitty Pryde and Colossus, but it featured the marriage of Rogue and Gambit instead. This led to a new comic book starring the duo, Mr. & Mrs. X.

== Plot summary ==
When the X-Men suspect foul play at a vacation resort, former romantic partners Rogue and Gambit infiltrate the resort by pretending to be a couple needing marriage counseling. They discover the resort is managed by the villain Lavish, who is taking mutant visitors captive and replacing them with robot duplicates. Rogue and Gambit destroy all the robots and free the captive people. During this mission, Rogue and Gambit become a couple again.

== Critical reception ==
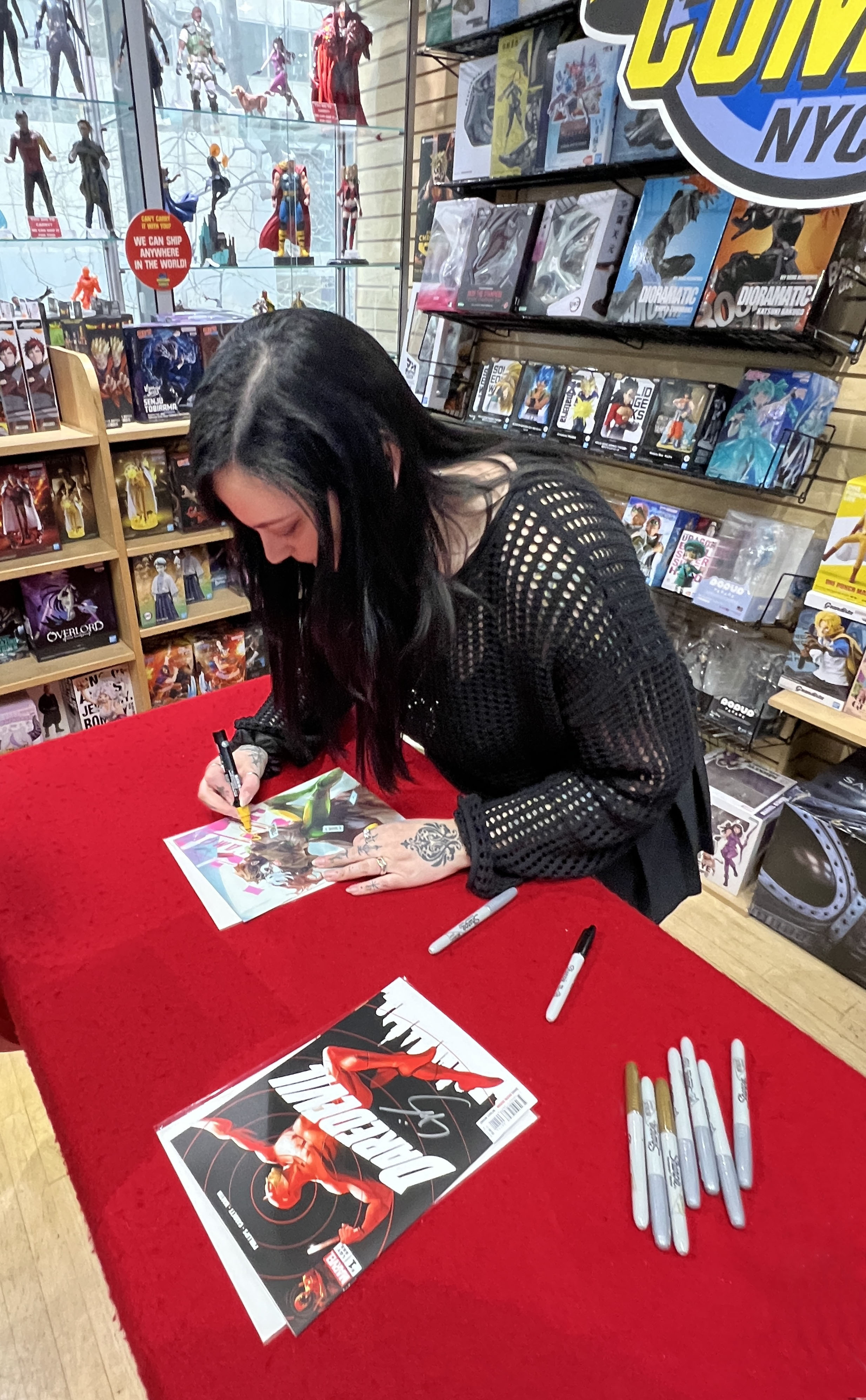
Writer Stephanie Phillips autographing a copy of the series at an April 2026 signing at Midtown Comics in Manhattan

=== Volume 1 – 2018 ===
The series has received mostly positive reviews, with critics praising its character focus, humor, and emotional depth. In Issue 1, IGN rated it 9.0, commending the lively tone and the blend of humor with romantic tension, emphasizing Thompson's strong grasp of the characters’ history. Bleeding Cool gave it an 8.5, highlighting its warmth and wit, and suggested that Thompson could excel in writing a broader X-Men series. Another review from Bleeding Cool, which gave it a lower rating of 6.0, pointed out that while fans of the couple might enjoy it, those unfamiliar with them might not be convinced. CBR found some of his characters to be stiff and sexless. This opinion is in contrast with Thompson, who said she was "surprised" by how sexy the artwork was.

Issue 2 maintained the positive momentum, with IGN again giving it a 9.0. While acknowledging the light story, they appreciated the deeper connection developing between the characters. ComicBook.com rated it 6.0, noting that while the humor was enjoyable, the mission primarily served as an excuse to bring the characters together.

Issue 3 saw ComicBook.com rate it 8.0, emphasizing the strong partnership between Rogue and Gambit and praising the vibrant artwork that enhanced the storytelling. Issue 4 also received an 8.0 from ComicBook.com, recognized for its heartbreaking examination of the couple’s struggles, which reinforced the series' emotional depth. The final installment, Issue 5, garnered high praise with a perfect 10 from ComicBook.com, described as a fitting conclusion that celebrates the couple’s journey and growth.

=== Volume 2 – 2023 ===
The review for Rogue & Gambit Volume 2 from ComicBook.com present a mixed reception of the series. The first issue attempts to rejuvenate the characters of Rogue and Gambit. Reviewer Chase Magnett felt the artwork was being energetic and fitting within Marvel's style, but felt the story lacked depth, leaving readers questioning the future of the characters’ dynamic. Kevin Lainez, reviewing the second issue for Comic Book Revolution, noted the book's attempt to highlight tension between the couple but felt it failed to clarify their relationship status, resulting in a disjointed narrative and a rating of 2.5 out of 5. Magnett, reviewing the third and fourth issues, felt that they offered standard superhero action and cater to die-hard fans, but opined that they lacking originality, and gave each issue a rating of 6 out of 10. The final issue has some notable moments, particularly with Destiny, but follows a predictable narrative.

== Collected editions ==
Title	Material collected	Pages	Publication date	ISBN
Rogue & Gambit: Ring of Fire	Rogue & Gambit Vol. 1 #1–5	112	July 2018	978 1302911607
Rogue & Gambit: Power Play	Rogue & Gambit Vol. 2 #1–5	136	January 2023	978-1302948061

== See also ==
- List of X-Men comics
