= Mr. & Mrs. X =

2018–19 limited series comic book

- #1 Variant. Art by Humberto Ramos.

Publication information
- Publisher: Marvel Comics
- Schedule: Monthly
- Format: Limited series
- Genre: Superhero
- Publication date: September 2018 – June 2019
- No. of issues: 12
- Main character(s): Rogue, Gambit

Creative team
- Written by: Kelly Thompson
- Pencillers: Jan Bazaldua; David Lopez; Javier Pina; Terry Dodson (cover artist)
- Editor: Darren Shan

Collected editions
- Love & Marriage: ISBN 978-1-3029-1351-9
- Gambit & Rogue Forever: ISBN 978-1-3029-1352-6

Mr. & Mrs. X is a 12-issue comic book limited series published by Marvel Comics between September 2018 and June 2019. Created by writer Kelly Thompson and artists Jan Bazaldua, Javier Pina, and David Lopez, it starred the X-Men characters Gambit and Rogue as they settle into married life. The series received generally positive reviews from comic critics.

== Publication history ==
X-Men Gold #30 was advertised as a comic featuring the marriage of Kitty Pryde and Colossus, but instead featured the surprise marriage of Gambit and Rogue. This led to a new comic book starring the duo, Mr. & Mrs. X. This followed on from the storyline of the five-issue miniseries Rogue & Gambit, also written by Thompson.

== Plot ==
Gambit and Rogue decide to get married. Beast creates a power-dampening necklace to allow Rogue to kiss at the wedding ceremony and enjoy their honeymoon in space, which is cut short by a distress signal from Kitty Pryde. There was a distress signal from Cerise, who is transporting a package from the Imperial Guard. They are rescued by Deadpool and discover the egg is the progeny of Lilandra Neramani and Professor X. They continue to protect the offspring, which chooses to be called Xandra, from Technet and Warbird's Shi'ar rebellion. A large battle ensues between all four factions, but Xandra is able to create a psychic illusion that she died, but then goes under the care of Cerise. During this psychic explosion, Rogue realizes she can now absorb powers without physical contact.

Gambit and Rogue try to enjoy their wedding reception, but are teleported to the Mojoverse. Rogue is comatose due to the fear gripping her with her new uncontrollable powers, so Spiral, who is enslaved by Mojo, helps her review her inner psyche in exchange for Gambit finding her missing soul shard. Rogue is called away from Captain Marvel, so Gambit then travels to meet with his father Jean-Luc, but is captured by Candra, the new head of the Assassin's Guild and Bella Donna, his ex-wife and chief of the Thieves' Guild. Candra betrays Bella Donna, and Rogue and Jean-Luc come to the rescue. The series concludes with Rogue and Gambit finally able to enjoy some time alone.

== Critical reception ==
According to Diamond Comic Distributors, Mr. & Mrs. X was the 15th best selling comic book in July 2018. Mr. & Mrs. X #1 was the 141st best selling comic book in 2018.

The critical reception for Mr. and Mrs. X was largely positive, with reviewers such as Jamie Lovett from ComicBook.com and Joshua Davison from Bleeding Cool giving the first issue an 8.5. Early issues 1–4 were commended for their energetic storytelling and engaging character dynamics, with Lovett frequently rating them 8.0, he noted Thompson’s writing and Bazaldua’s artwork as key strengths, capturing the charm and humor of Rogue and Gambit's relationship.

As the series progressed, Lovett continued to review the issues positively, particularly around issue 5, where the narrative slowed down to focus on the newlyweds' relationship. However, by issues 8 to 10, Lovett’s reviews dipped slightly, with ratings of 6.0, pointing out that these installments felt more like setup and lacked the tight execution of earlier issues. In the final issues 11 and 12, Lovett praised the series for its action-packed conclusion and the focus on both Gambit and Rogue's marriage, with ComicBook.com's Chase Magnett also highlighting the satisfying wrap-up to their story. It was celebrated for its entertaining mix of superhero action and heartfelt romantic drama.

=== Mr. & Mrs. X ===
	Title	Material collected	Pages	Publication Date	ISBN
1	Love & Marriage	Mr. & Mrs. X #1–6	136	March 12, 2019	978-1-3029-1351-9
2	Gambit & Rogue Forever	Mr. & Mrs. X #7–12	136	August 27, 2019	978-1-3029-1352-6

== See also ==
- List of X-Men comics
