= Rogue (Marvel Comics) =

Marvel Comics character

- Various incarnations of Rogue, as depicted in textless variant cover of Excalibur #18 (April 2021). Art by Russell Dauterman.

Publication information
- Publisher: Marvel Comics
- First appearance: The Avengers Annual #10 (October 1981)
- Created by: Chris Claremont; Michael Golden

In-story information
- Full name: Anna Marie (maiden name unknown)
- Species: Human mutant
- Place of origin: Caldecott County, Mississippi, United States
- Team affiliations: X-Men; Brotherhood of Evil Mutants; X-Treme X-Men; Avengers Unity Squad
- Partnerships: Gambit
- Notable aliases: Anna Raven; Anna Marie LeBeau
- Abilities: Attribute, memory, and energy absorption through tactile contact; Superhuman strength, speed, durability, and flight

Rogue is a character appearing in American comic books published by Marvel Comics, commonly in association with the X-Men. She first appeared in The Avengers Annual #10 (1981). In the Marvel Universe, Rogue is depicted as a mutant, a subspecies of humans born with an "X-gene" that grants superhuman abilities. She is capable of absorbing the life force, attributes, memories, and superpowers of anyone through physical touch. The character is initially portrayed as a reluctant supervillain, but she soon joins the X-Men as a superhero and has since endured as one of its most prominent members.

Rogue's early history was only revealed over twenty years after her introduction. The backstory established her real name as Anna Marie, although her surname remains unknown. A runaway from the fictional Caldecott County, Mississippi, Rogue is adopted by Mystique and Destiny and inducted into the Brotherhood of Evil Mutants. She permanently absorbs Ms. Marvel's psyche and abilities and, fearing for her sanity, defects from the Brotherhood to join the X-Men to use her powers for good. Although she would later gain full control of her mutant abilities, Rogue considers them a curse for many years as they prevent her from getting close to others, including her on-off love interest and eventual husband Gambit, with whom she stars in the team series Rogue & Gambit and Mr. and Mrs. X.

Often listed as one of the most notable and powerful female characters in Marvel Comics, Rogue has been adapted in various media incarnations. Lenore Zann voiced the character in X-Men: The Animated Series (1992–1997) and its revival X-Men '97 (2024–present). Anna Paquin portrayed the character in 20th Century Fox's X-Men film series (2000–2014). Inde Navarrette will portray the character in the Marvel Cinematic Universe, starting with the untitled X-Men film (2028).

== Publication history ==
=== Creation and development ===
Rogue was first slated to appear in Ms. Marvel #25 in 1979 (and artwork for the first half of the story was completed), but the book's abrupt cancellation left her original introduction story unpublished for over a decade until it was printed in Marvel Super Heroes (vol.2) #11 in 1992. The character was created by writer Chris Claremont and artist Michael Golden. In an interview conducted in 2016, Claremont declared that the only advice he gave to Golden in designing the character was that Rogue should be inspired by Grace Jones and that she should have streaks of white in her hair.

=== 1980s ===
Rogue's first published appearance was in Avengers Annual #10 (1981). In contrast to her later appearances, in this first story Rogue is depicted as having no conscience. In the story, Mystique acts as the adoptive mother of Rogue, whom she has recruited to the Brotherhood of Mutants. Mystique instigates her to steal the powers of Carol Danvers.

Her second appearances and first cover appearances were Rom #31 and in Uncanny X-Men #158, both published in June 1982. She next appeared as an antagonist in Dazzler #22-24 (Aug-Oct 1982) before joining the X-Men in Uncanny X-Men #171 (1983). Initially, Wolverine distrusts and dislikes Rogue, because of the harm she has done to his friend Danvers. Claremont, Rogue's co-creator, explained that he had the character join the X-Men because he was disturbed that other writers were using her in Rom and Dazzler; bringing her into the group meant that no other writer could use her without consulting him.

=== 1990s and after ===
In Uncanny X-Men #269 (Oct 1990), Rogue journeys to the Savage Land; her costume is shredded into a kind of bikini, leading to a much more sexualized depiction of the character. Beginning with X-Men #1 in 1991, Rogue was part of the X-Men's Blue Team, along with Wolverine, Cyclops, Beast, Gambit, Psylocke, and Jubillee. In X-Men vol. 2 #4 (January 1992), Gambit begins to romantically pursue Rogue.

In 1994 Rogue received her own limited series, a sequel to the 1993 Gambit limited series which starred Rogue's love interest. It was created under the Marvel method and was the first work by Mike Wieringo for Marvel Comics.

Rogue's real name and early history were not revealed until more than 20 years after her introduction. Until the backstory provided by Robert Rodi in the ongoing Rogue series, begun in September 2004, her background was only hinted at. This resulted in Rodi's version of Rogue's origins inadvertently conflicting with earlier information. In X-Men Unlimited #4, Scott Lobdell indicates that Rogue ran away from her father after her mutant powers manifested, but in Uncanny X-Men #182, Rogue reflects that she never knew her father because he had left before she was born, and several issues, including Uncanny X-Men #178 and X-Men #93, indicate that Rogue was taken in by Mystique and Destiny before her mutation became active.

Chris Claremont said in June 2016 that, had he not left Marvel in 1991, Mystique would have been Rogue's real mother. It is a storyline that appeared in a 2009 run of the series X-Men Forever.

Rogue was a regular character in Uncanny Avengers (2012), beginning with issue #1.

Rogue had two limited solo series between 1995 and 2000, followed by an ongoing series from 2004 to 2005, and she is slated for a fourth volume set for release in 2026.

2025 saw the publication of a limited series titled Rogue: The Savage Land by writer Tim Seeley and artist Zulema Lavina.

== Characterization ==
=== Fictional character biography ===
Anna Marie (full name unknown) was originally presented as being born in Georgia, United States, though this was changed shortly afterward to a fictional place called Caldecott County, located in Mississippi. She was born in a commune near the Mississippi River to her hippie parents, Owen and Priscilla, who married early in their relationship. She grew up near the banks of the Mississippi River, and was raised speaking colloquial English and French. After her parents became involved in a plan to find the mythical "Far Banks", they performed a ceremony during which Anna's mother "crossed over", leaving her father alone. He asked his sister-in-law, Carrie, to help raise Anna; however, Carrie's strict nature led Anna to rebel, earning her the nickname "Rogue", and she eventually ran away from home. In the nearby swamps, the shape-shifting mutant Mystique found Rogue, offered to take her in, and soon Rogue came to see her as a surrogate mother.

Rogue's mutant powers first manifested during her teenage years. When she kissed Cody Robbins, Rogue unintentionally absorbed his memories, leaving him comatose. Terrified, Rogue fled and was chased by an angry mob who tried to lynch her, but she managed to escape after Nathan Summers helped her. Mystique then taught her how to use her powers, though she could not teach her how to control them. Accepting that she could never live a normal life, Rogue began participating in Mystique's criminal activities and eventually joined Mystique's Brotherhood of Mutants.

When Destiny foresaw that Ms. Marvel (Carol Danvers) was connected to a tragedy that could one day cost Rogue her life, Mystique tried to destroy Danvers. Wanting to please Mystique, Rogue attacks Ms. Marvel; during the fight, she permanently absorbs Danvers' powers and memories. Later, Mystique sets Rogue against Angel (Warren Worthington), hoping to locate the X-Men through him. During the mission, Rogue, growing frustrated by her inability to control her powers and rid her mind of Danvers' psyche, seeks help from Professor Charles Xavier and his team, the X-Men. Despite the team's objections, Rogue joined them.

Shortly after, Rogue enters the Siege Perilous, a mystical gateway that gives people a second chance at life. The gateway splits Rogue and the Danvers persona, who attacks her and forces her to flee to the Savage Land. Rogue eventually surrenders to Danvers, but both are rendered unconscious by Magneto. Magneto uses a device to transfer Danvers' powers back to Rogue, effectively destroying the construct. Rogue stays with Magneto until she witnesses his brutal murder of Savage Land priestess Zaladane.

As an act of penance, Rogue continues to visit Cody Robbins at a hospice run by a religious order. He is later abducted by assassins sent by Gambit's ex-wife, Bella Donna, as part of a revenge plot against Rogue. Cody is used as a pawn in the ensuing fight between Rogue and Candra and eventually dies. Rogue makes amends with Cody's spirit, who urges her to move on.

Rogue briefly falls under the Shadow King's control until his defeat by the X-Men and X-Factor. She then rejoins the X-Men and becomes attracted to a new recruit, Gambit. They eventually fall in love and share a kiss, during which Rogue absorbs Gambit's memories and learns about his past involvement with Mr. Sinister. Disturbed by what she discovered, Rogue flees to South Carolina and works as a waitress until she is attacked by the anti-mutant forces during the events of Operation: Zero Tolerance. She is saved by Magneto's clone Joseph and joins him in helping the X-Men battle Onslaught, remaining with the team afterward. Later, Rogue became an X-Men field leader, and was part of the X-Treme X-Men team led by Storm.

After Avengers vs. X-Men, Rogue accepts membership in the 'Avengers Unity' team, and the team makes its debut as the Avengers Unity Squad. Later on, Rogue becomes the field leader of the Avengers Unity Squad. Later, she returns to the Xavier Institute in New York after the incarceration of Kitty Pryde and forms a secondary team with Iceman, Armor, Ink, Magma, and Magik. Rogue eventually married Gambit. Following the Ashes era, and shortly after Xavier Institute was converted into a prison, Rogue becomes the leader of a team consisting of Wolverine, Gambit, Jubilee, and Nightcrawler. The team operates from a new base in New Orleans, Louisiana, which serves as both their headquarters and a training home for young mutants.

=== Powers and abilities ===
For many years, Rogue used a pair of gloves to regulate her uncontrollable mutant absorption abilities

Rogue is a mutant with the potential of reaching Omega-level. She was initially introduced as an antagonist to the X-Men and a rival to Carol Danvers, the original Ms. Marvel, before eventually becoming a hero. Rogue has the ability to gain superpowers through tactile contact, absorbing the abilities, energy, and memories of others, but this drains their life energy in the process. The longer she maintains physical contact, the more powers, memories, and emotions she can absorb. Most notably, she semi-permanently absorbed the powers and psyche of Carol Danvers. This largely established her standard power-set and gave her superhuman strength, speed, durability, flight, and (rarely used) limited pre-cognition. In later stories, Rogue lost the powers from Carol Danvers, but writers have had her permanently re-acquire them from other characters.

Her absorbing power makes her a "formidable and often feared member of any team she joins". She can use these powers both to defend against opponents and to attack in combat, with such abilities often described as "stolen", which highlights her reliance on others' powers and distinguishes her from traditional heroes who gain their abilities naturally or through personal merit. However, this power prevents her from maintaining close relationships, especially intimate ones, even though she still desires connection with others.

== Reception ==
Martyn Warren of Screen Rant referred to Rogue as "one of the greatest X-Men of all," writing, "Rogue made her first appearance in Avengers Annual #10 in 1981 and since her debut, she has become one of the most recognizable super-powered mutant members of the X-Men. Her power to absorb the life force of humans and the powers of mutants with physical contact does make her a potentially dangerous ally. But with such a caring heart and an upbeat personality, she always takes a challenge head-on, no matter how difficult it is. With multiple appearances in comics, television shows, and films, she has gained a huge fan base who treasure the many quotes she has delivered over the past 40 years." Michael Austin of CBR.com called Rogue "one of X-Men's most popular women," saying, "One of the most popular superhero teams of all time, the X-Men's roster is made up of many different iconic characters. Marvel has also used those characters to craft some of the best stories in comic book history. One of the most important of these characters is Rogue. Although initially a villain, Rogue quickly rose to become one of the most popular X-Men. She has come a long way since her villainous beginnings and has been a part in some of the best X-Men teams and stories ever." Darren Franich of Entertainment Weekly described Rogue as one of the characters "who left a significant footprint on X-history," asserting, "She's been a young villain-ingenue and a flowing-hair babe with a Gambit fixation, but there's always something fundamentally sad and fascinating about Rogue. Her superpower is tragic at the level of great science fiction: If she touches anyone, she absorbs their powers, their memories, and their whole life. (Touch them too long and they die.) Rogue is how you teach kids about melancholy." Jacob Threadgill of The Clarion-Ledger stated, "Hailing from fictional Caldecott County, Mississippi, the character Rogue has gone from misunderstood villain to one of the most beloved female characters in comic book history as a member of the X-Men. In popular culture, Rogue's backstory of isolation as a confused teen who has the ability to absorb fellow mutants' powers, memory and personality has struck a chord with fans worldwide."

George Marston of Newsarama referred to Rogue as one of the "best X-Men members of all time," asserting, "Rogue started out as a villain, but for the Avengers rather than the X-Men. Since reforming to heroism, Rogue has become one of the most long running and powerful members of the X-Men." Matthew Aguilar of ComicBook.com asserted, "Over the years the X-Man known as Rogue has seen many changes to her powers, costume, and even personality. Those are interesting in their own right, but today the focus is squarely on the many looks she's adopted over the years, each of which has its own cadre of fans. The character left quite the impression on the Avengers in her first appearance (1981's Avengers Annual #10), and ever since she's been a stalwart of the X-Men universe. Granted she started out on the wrong side of things, but hey, it doesn't matter where you start, only where you finish. Fortune cookie psychology aside, Rogue appeals to fans because of her unyielding charisma, her southern charm, and an intriguing powerset that comes with its own struggles. She can fly, lift a tank, and punch through a wall, but being cut off from physical contact with others has always been a fly in the ointment, and that struggle is an essential part of the character." Matthew Perpetua of BuzzFeed stated, "She's easily one of the best characters on a purely thematic level. She's a walking, talking metaphor for sexual anxiety, particularly during the AIDS epidemic of the '80s – she can't touch ANYONE without absorbing part of them and potentially killing them. The character has suffered a bit in recent years thanks to writers insisting on giving her control over her powers and reversing a lot of what makes her special, but Rick Remender has done a good job of reconnecting Rogue with her impulsive, surly roots over in Uncanny Avengers." Sara Century of Syfy said, "Gambit and Rogue are a couple that becomes infinitely more intriguing due to their ability to find stability with one another. The easier and more lighthearted the dynamic, the sexier it becomes. In more recent days, Rogue and Gambit have gone from being a hopelessly melodramatic and toxic pairing to being the X-Men's most endearing couple. They worked through their issues together in therapy and reunited in a surprisingly healthy way. When Kitty Pryde left Colossus at the altar, Gambit took the opportunity to propose to Rogue, and they turned attention from an exhausted relationship to a promising new future together. Without question, Gambit and Rogue are at their very best now, and it's refreshing to read a couple who are just flat-out good for one another in a mythos mired so often in frustration and personal tragedy."

In contrast to the "masculine American monomyth," which often depicts male heroes as solitary and independent figures who may enjoy the "occasional romantic dalliance" yet ultimately remain alone, Rogue is defined by her quest for "relational connection", a trait that positions her as relatively weaker than her male counterparts. This also aligns her with the alternative narrative structure Maureen Murdock calls the heroine's journey, in which female heroes often operate collaboratively, something traditionally not essential for male heroes, who are usually shown to act alone, neither out of necessity nor preference. Rogue is thus an illustrative example of the relative powerlessness and subordinate roles of women within mainstream comic books.

=== Accolades ===
- In 2006, IGN ranked Rogue 5th in their "Top 25 X-Men" list.
- In 2008, CBR.com ranked Rogue 1st in their "Top 50 X-Men of All Time" list.
- In 2011, Comics Buyer's Guide ranked Rogue 10th in their "100 Sexiest Women in Comics" list.
- In 2011, IGN ranked Rogue 5th in their "Top 25 X-Men" list.
- In 2014, BuzzFeed ranked Rogue 5th in their "95 X-Men Members Ranked From Worst To Best" list.
- In 2015, Bustle ranked Rogue 11th in their "14 Female Superheroes Who Deserve Stardom" list.
- In 2015, Entertainment Weekly ranked Rogue 4th in their "Let's rank every X-Man ever" list.
- In 2017, Comicbook.com ranked Rogue 8th in their "10 Best X-Men" list.
- In 2018, CBR.com ranked Rogue 10th in their "Age Of Apocalypse: The 30 Strongest Characters In Marvel's Coolest Alternate World" list and 6th in their "20 Most Powerful Mutants From The '80s" list.
- In 2018, GameSpot ranked Rogue 28th in their "50 Most Important Superheroes" list.
- In 2019, Mashable ranked Rogue 2nd in their "8 Badass Women of Marvel We Cannot Stop Fangirling Over" list.
- In 2019, Comicbook.com ranked Rogue 37th in their "50 Most Important Superheroes Ever" list.
- In 2020, Scary Mommy included Rogue in their "195+ Marvel Female Characters Are Truly Heroic" list.
- In 2021, CBR.com ranked Rogue 4th in their "10 Strongest Characters From X-Men Comics" list and 6th in their "20 Strongest Female Superheroes" list.
- In 2021, Women in the World ranked Rogue 15th in their "Best Female Marvel Characters" list.
- In 2021, Screen Rant ranked Rogue 1st in their "Marvel Comics: The 10 Greatest Redemptions" list, 4th in their "The 10 Strongest X-Men" list, and ranked Rogue and Gambit 9th in their "10 Best Relationships in The X-Men Comics" list.
- In 2022, CBR.com ranked Rogue 2nd in their "Marvel: 10 Best Reformed Villains" list, 5th in their "10 X-Men Characters Fans Want In the MCU" list, and 7th in their "The Avengers' Greatest Leaders" list.
- In 2022, Sportskeeda ranked Rogue 6th in their "10 best X-Men characters who also joined the Avengers" list.
- In 2022, Newsarama ranked Rogue 10th in their "Best X-Men members of all time" list.
- In 2022, Screen Rant ranked Rogue 2nd in their "Top 10 X-Men, Ranked by Fighting Skills" list, 5th in their "10 Best X-Men Characters Created By Chris Claremont" list, 6th in their "10 Best Marvel Comics Characters That Went From Villain To Friend" list, and included her in their "10 Most Powerful X-Men" list.
- In 2022, MovieWeb ranked Rogue 6th in their "X-Men Characters That Need Redemption In The MCU" list.
- In 2022, Digital Trends ranked Rogue 9th in their "Marvel's most powerful mutants" list.
- In 2023, CBR.com ranked Rogue 6th in their "10 Most Fashionable Marvel Heroes" list.

== Other versions ==
=== Age of Apocalypse ===
In the Age of Apocalypse reality, Rogue is brought to Magneto and his X-Men by Mystique to learn control of her powers. Rogue and Magneto's relationship develops after Xavier's death leads Magneto to lead the X-Men. Though Rogue is initially with Gambit, she chooses to save Magneto during a battle with Wolverine, causing Gambit to leave. After permanently absorbing Polaris's magnetic powers, Rogue becomes able to touch Magneto, and the two eventually marry and have a son named Charles.

=== Ultimate Marvel ===
Rogue also appears in the Ultimate Marvel continuity, where her real name is Marian. She is an orphan raised by Mystique and trained for the Brotherhood of Evil Mutants before eventually breaking away and joining the X-Men. In this universe, she is introduced as one of several mutants captured and experimented on by the government's Weapon X program before becoming part of the main team.

=== Ultimate Universe ===
An alternate universe version of Rogue appears in the Ultimate Universe.

== In other media ==
=== Television ===
Rogue has been adapted in several animated television series, first appearing in X-Men: The Animated Series (1992–1997), where she was voiced by Lenore Zann. Initially, series director Larry Houston planned an X-Men team without Rogue, with Shadowcat in the original lineup. However, Marvel requested that Shadowcat be replaced with Rogue. The character later appears in the revival X-Men '97 (2024–present), with Zann reprising her role. Rogue also appeared in the second season of Spider-Man: The Animated Series (1994–1998), voiced by Zann.

Rogue appeared in X-Men: Evolution (2000–2003), voiced by Meghan Black. This version is reimagined as a sullen and reclusive teenage goth, as the producers of the series believed her absorption powers would make her isolated, cynical, and insecure due to her desire to get close to others. She also appeared in Wolverine and the X-Men (2009), voiced by Kieren van den Blink. This version was an amalgamation that mixed traits from the earlier animated series with elements from the films. Rogue also made a non-speaking appearance in the Marvel Anime: X-Men (2011) episode "Destiny - Bond".

=== Films ===
Anna Paquin as Rogue in a promotional poster for X-Men: Days of Future Past - The Rogue Cut (2015)

A film adaptation of Rogue appeared in 20th Century Fox's X-Men film series (2000–2024), played by Anna Paquin. Paquin first appeared as a supporting character in X-Men (2000), and reprised the role in X2 (2003), and X-Men: The Last Stand (2006). She later returned in X-Men: Days of Future Past (2014), though only for a brief cameo in the theatrical release. According to director Bryan Singer, the majority of her scenes had been cut from this version of the film as her subplot "became extraneous". The scenes were later included in the director's cut, titled The Rogue Cut (2015).

The film series depicts a different version of the character compared to her in the comics. In the film, her role is reduced, her superpowers weakened, and she is depicted as a damsel in distress. This depiction has been examined as it reflects traditional cultural portrayals of women in comic books and illustrates the subordinate roles often assigned to them in mainstream comics, as well as the "marginalization of Marvel's female superheroes in films".

Inde Navarrette will portray Rogue in the Marvel Cinematic Universe, starting with untitled X-Men film (2028).

=== Video games ===
Rogue has appeared in numerous video games since 1990. Zann voiced the character in X-Men vs. Street Fighter (1997) and Marvel Rivals (2024). Jennifer Hale provided her voice in Spider-Man 2: Enter Electro (training mode, 2001), X-Men: Next Dimension (2002), and X-2: Wolverine's Revenge (2003). Megan Fahlenbock voiced Rogue in X-Men: Mutant Academy 2 (2001), while Erin Matthews voiced the character in X-Men Legends (2004) and Catherine Taber in X-Men Legends 2: Rise of Apocalypse (2005).

Rogue also appeared in other games without voice acting credits, including X-Men 2: Fall of Mutants (1990), Sega Genesis X-Men (1993), the X-Men Game Gear trilogy (X-Men in 1994; X-Men: Gamesmaster's Legacy, in 1995; X-Men: Mojo World, in 1996), Marvel vs. Capcom: Clash of Super Heroes (1998), Marvel vs. Capcom 2: New Age of Heroes (2000), X-Men: Reign of Apocalypse (2001), LittleBigPlanet (2008, DLC), Ultimate Marvel vs. Capcom 3 (2011), Marvel Super Hero Squad Online (2011), Marvel Avengers Alliance (2012), Deadpool (2013), Marvel Heroes (2013), Marvel Puzzle Quest (2013), Marvel Contest of Champions (2014), Marvel: Future Fight (2015), Fortnite Battle Royale (alternate skin), and Marvel Snap (2018).

=== Miscellaneous ===
The character appeared in the Marvel Knights: Wolverine versus Sabretooth motion comic, voiced by Kazumi Evans. She also appeared in the Death Battle! episode "Rogue vs. Wonder Woman". Additionally, Rogue appeared as a meet-and-greet character at Marvel Super Hero Island.

== Collected editions ==
Title	Material collected	Publication date	ISBN
Solo series (1995–present)
Rogue	Rogue (vol. 1) #1–4	November 1995	978-0752201030
X Men Icons: Rogue	Rogue (vol. 2) #1–4	May 2002	978-0785108764
Rogue Vol. 1: Going Rogue	Rogue (vol. 3) #1–6	March 2005	978-0785113362
Rogue Vol. 2: Forget Me Not	Rogue (vol. 3) #7–12	October 2005	978-0785117346
Rogue: The Complete Collection	Rogue (vol. 3) #1–12	September 2015	978-0785197218
Other series
X-Men: Gambit & Rogue	Rogue (vol. 1) #1–4 and Gambit (vol. 2) #1–4	October 2016	978-1302902483
Rogue & Gambit: Rings of Fire	Rogue & Gambit (vol. 1) #1–5	July 2018	978-1302911607
Mr. and Mrs. X Vol. 1: Love And Marriage	Mr. and Mrs. X #1–6	March 2019	978-1302913519
Mr. and Mrs. X Vol. 2: Gambit and Rogue Forever	Mr. and Mrs. X #7–12	August 2019	978-1302913526
Captain Marvel Vs. Rogue	Avengers Annual #10, Uncanny X-Men #158, 171, 269, Ms. Marvel #9–10, X-Men: Legacy #269–270, Captain Marvel #4–5 and material from Marvel Super-Heroes #11	June 2021	978-1302926519
Rogue & Gambit: Power Play	Rogue & Gambit (vol. 2) #1–5	January 2024	978-1302948061
Rogue: The Savage Land	Rogue: The Savage Land #1–5	September 2025	978- 1302964412
