= West Branch, Michigan =

- City
- City of West Branch
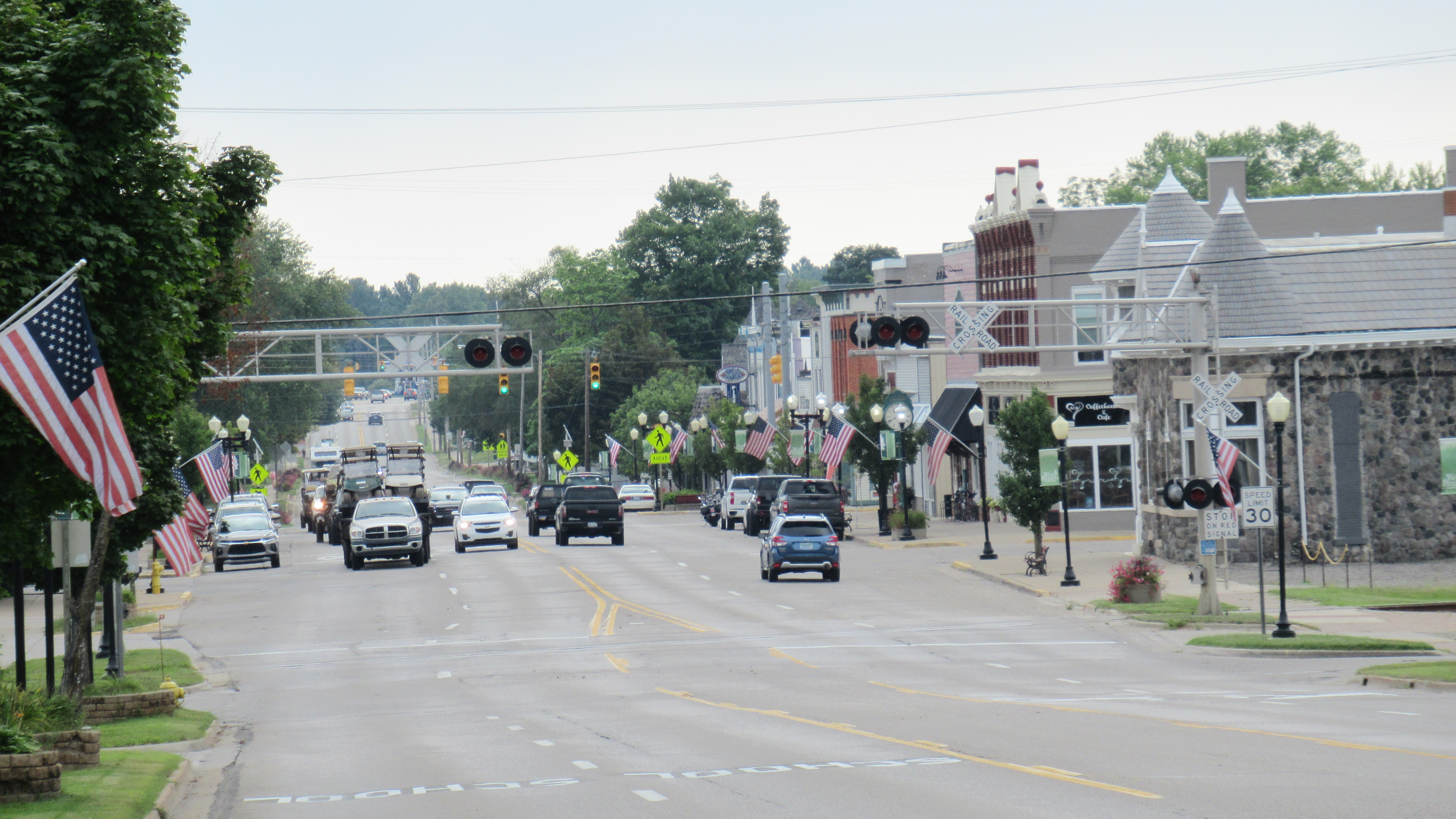
- Downtown West Branch along Houghton Avenue
- Motto: "Up North. Down Home."
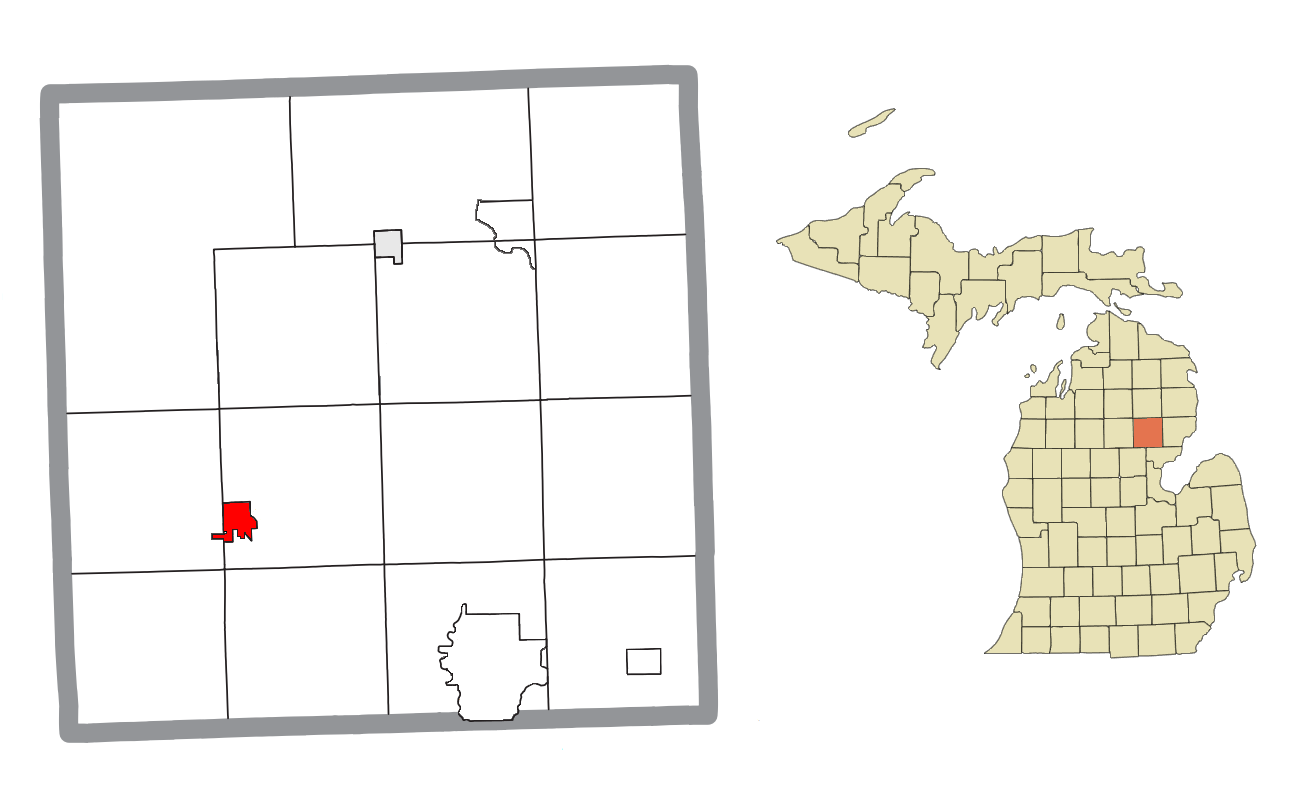
- Location within Ogemaw County

- Location within the state of Michigan Location within the United States
- Coordinates: 44°16′32″N 84°14′07″W
- Country: United States
- State: Michigan
- County: Ogemaw
- Incorporated: 1885 (village); 1905 (city)

Government
  - Type: Mayor–council
  - Mayor: Paul Frechette
  - Manager: John Dantzer

Area
  - Total: 1.54 sq mi (3.99 km^{2})
  - Land: 1.54 sq mi (3.99 km^{2})
  - Water: 0 sq mi (0.00 km^{2})
- Elevation: 955 ft (291 m)

Population (2020)
  - Total: 2,351
  - Density: 1,527.9/sq mi (589.92/km^{2})
- Time zone: UTC-5 (Eastern (EST))
  - Summer (DST): UTC-4 (EDT)
- ZIP code(s): 48661
- Area code: 989
- FIPS code: 26-85580
- GNIS feature ID: 1627248
- Website: Official website

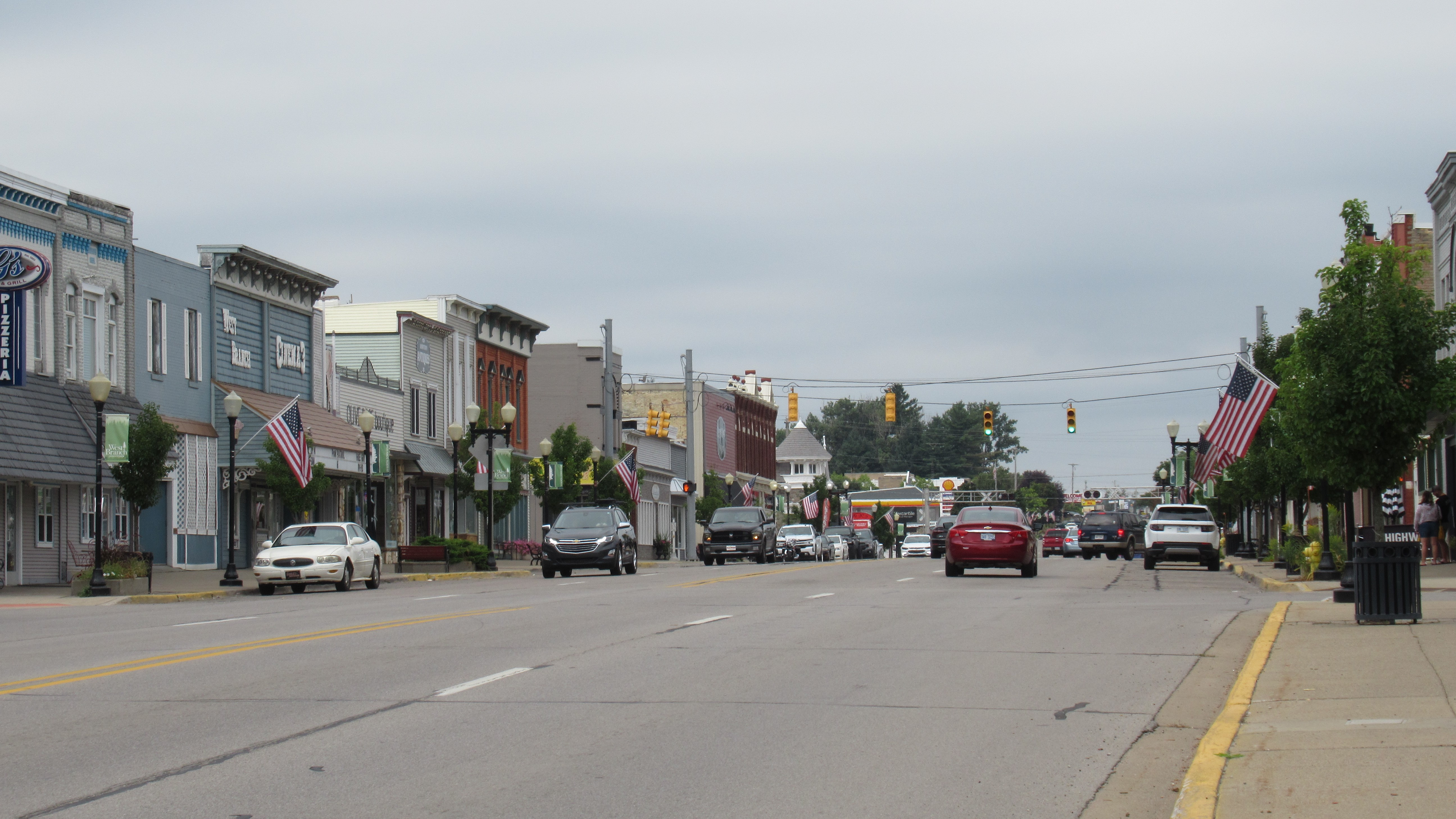
Looking east along Houghton Avenue

West Branch is a city in the U.S. state of Michigan. It is the county seat of and the largest incorporated settlement in Ogemaw County. The city had a population of 2,351 at the 2020 census, an increase from 2,139 at the 2010 census. West Branch is mostly surrounded by West Branch Township, but the two are administered autonomously.

== History ==
In 1875, a northerly extension of the Michigan Central Railroad was completed through present-day West Branch. The community, which originated as a station on the railroad, was named for its location near the west branch of the Rifle River, which flows southeasterly to Saginaw Bay, a bay of Lake Huron.

Ogemaw County was organized by an act of state legislature in 1873, with both West Branch and nearby Ogemaw Springs vying to become county seat. West Branch officially became the county seat in 1876. West Branch was incorporated as a village in 1885, and as a city in 1905.

== Geography ==
According to the U.S. Census Bureau, the city has a total area of 1.53 square miles (3.96 km^{2}), all land.

=== Climate ===
This climatic region is typified by large seasonal temperature differences, with warm to hot (and often humid) summers and cold (sometimes severely cold) winters. According to the Köppen Climate Classification system, West Branch has a humid continental climate, abbreviated "Dfb" on climate maps.

Climate data for West Branch, Michigan (1991–2020 normals, extremes 1900–present)
Month	Jan	Feb	Mar	Apr	May	Jun	Jul	Aug	Sep	Oct	Nov	Dec	Year
Record high °F (°C)	62 (17)	70 (21)	86 (30)	91 (33)	96 (36)	105 (41)	107 (42)	103 (39)	97 (36)	89 (32)	77 (25)	68 (20)	107 (42)
Mean maximum °F (°C)	45.6 (7.6)	48.8 (9.3)	63.8 (17.7)	77.0 (25.0)	86.1 (30.1)	90.6 (32.6)	91.3 (32.9)	89.9 (32.2)	86.5 (30.3)	77.7 (25.4)	62.8 (17.1)	50.0 (10.0)	93.4 (34.1)
Mean daily maximum °F (°C)	27.4 (−2.6)	30.4 (−0.9)	40.9 (4.9)	53.7 (12.1)	67.0 (19.4)	76.3 (24.6)	80.3 (26.8)	78.5 (25.8)	71.4 (21.9)	57.8 (14.3)	43.6 (6.4)	32.7 (0.4)	55.0 (12.8)
Daily mean °F (°C)	18.9 (−7.3)	20.3 (−6.5)	29.9 (−1.2)	42.0 (5.6)	54.6 (12.6)	64.2 (17.9)	68.3 (20.2)	66.5 (19.2)	58.9 (14.9)	46.9 (8.3)	35.3 (1.8)	25.5 (−3.6)	44.3 (6.8)
Mean daily minimum °F (°C)	10.4 (−12.0)	10.1 (−12.2)	18.9 (−7.3)	30.3 (−0.9)	42.2 (5.7)	52.2 (11.2)	56.4 (13.6)	54.5 (12.5)	46.4 (8.0)	36.0 (2.2)	26.9 (−2.8)	18.2 (−7.7)	33.5 (0.8)
Mean minimum °F (°C)	−11.2 (−24.0)	−10.8 (−23.8)	−2.7 (−19.3)	16.8 (−8.4)	27.9 (−2.3)	38.3 (3.5)	44.8 (7.1)	43.5 (6.4)	33.1 (0.6)	23.8 (−4.6)	11.7 (−11.3)	−1.5 (−18.6)	−15.0 (−26.1)
Record low °F (°C)	−30 (−34)	−36 (−38)	−33 (−36)	−11 (−24)	15 (−9)	25 (−4)	30 (−1)	30 (−1)	21 (−6)	5 (−15)	−15 (−26)	−27 (−33)	−36 (−38)
Average precipitation inches (mm)	2.05 (52)	1.61 (41)	1.83 (46)	3.40 (86)	3.48 (88)	3.53 (90)	3.48 (88)	3.44 (87)	2.73 (69)	3.31 (84)	2.55 (65)	2.15 (55)	33.56 (852)
Average snowfall inches (cm)	14.7 (37)	11.7 (30)	6.9 (18)	2.9 (7.4)	0.1 (0.25)	0.0 (0.0)	0.0 (0.0)	0.0 (0.0)	0.0 (0.0)	0.3 (0.76)	3.8 (9.7)	12.6 (32)	53.0 (135)
Average extreme snow depth inches (cm)	9.8 (25)	10.4 (26)	8.5 (22)	2.2 (5.6)	0.1 (0.25)	0.0 (0.0)	0.0 (0.0)	0.0 (0.0)	0.0 (0.0)	0.2 (0.51)	2.2 (5.6)	6.2 (16)	12.3 (31)
Average precipitation days (≥ 0.01 in)	13.1	9.5	9.0	11.4	12.3	11.4	10.6	10.5	11.0	13.4	11.8	13.3	137.3
Average snowy days (≥ 0.1 in)	10.7	8.8	5.0	1.6	0.1	0.0	0.0	0.0	0.0	0.1	3.3	9.4	39.0
Source: NOAA

=== Major highways ===
- I-75 is a major north–south freeway that passes to the southwest of the city.
- BL I-75 serves as a business route through the city of West Branch.
- M-30 is a north–south route with a northern terminus in the city.
- M-55 is an east–west route that traverses the Lower Peninsula from Manistee to Tawas City.

== Demographics ==
Historical population
Census	Pop.	Note	%±
1880	139		—
1890	1,302		836.7%
1900	1,412		8.4%
1910	1,276		−9.6%
1920	1,105		−13.4%
1930	1,164		5.3%
1940	1,962		68.6%
1950	2,098		6.9%
1960	2,025		−3.5%
1970	1,912		−5.6%
1980	1,785		−6.6%
1990	1,914		7.2%
2000	1,926		0.6%
2010	2,139		11.1%
2020	2,351		9.9%
U.S. Decennial Census

=== 2020 census ===
As of the 2020 census, West Branch had a population of 2,351. The median age was 42.6 years. 19.8% of residents were under the age of 18 and 25.1% of residents were 65 years of age or older. For every 100 females there were 77.4 males, and for every 100 females age 18 and over there were 75.8 males age 18 and over.

0.0% of residents lived in urban areas, while 100.0% lived in rural areas.

There were 1,126 households in West Branch, of which 22.9% had children under the age of 18 living in them. Of all households, 24.9% were married-couple households, 21.4% were households with a male householder and no spouse or partner present, and 45.4% were households with a female householder and no spouse or partner present. About 49.3% of all households were made up of individuals and 25.3% had someone living alone who was 65 years of age or older.

There were 1,219 housing units, of which 7.6% were vacant. The homeowner vacancy rate was 3.0% and the rental vacancy rate was 4.6%.

Racial composition as of the 2020 census
Race	Number	Percent
White	2,190	93.2%
Black or African American	17	0.7%
American Indian and Alaska Native	6	0.3%
Asian	13	0.6%
Native Hawaiian and Other Pacific Islander	2	0.1%
Some other race	5	0.2%
Two or more races	118	5.0%
Hispanic or Latino (of any race)	65	2.8%

=== Demographic estimates ===
The median household income was $30,508. The percentage of people who drove to work alone was 77.7%, while 12.5% carpooled and 5.06% walked; the most common way to commute was driving alone. Median earnings for men were $35,054 and for women were $24,234. The industries with the highest median earnings for men were Construction ($42,353), Entertainment, Arts, Recreation, Accommodations and Food Services ($42,188), and Manufacturing ($35,677). On average there were 2 cars per household, and average commute time was 19.1 minutes. Per capita personal health care spending in Michigan was $8,055 in 2014, a 4% increase from the previous year ($7,745). Insured persons by age were distributed as 18.3% under 18 years, 20.7% between 18 and 34 years, 31.9% between 35 and 64 years, and 29.1% over 64 years.

=== 2010 census ===
As of the census of 2010, there were 2,139 people, 1,006 households, and 489 families living in the city. The population density was 1,445.3 inhabitants per square mile (558.0/km^{2}). There were 1,147 housing units at an average density of 775.0 per square mile (299.2/km^{2}). The racial makeup of the city was 96.9% White, 0.5% African American, 0.6% Native American, 0.7% Asian, 0.2% from other races, and 1.1% from two or more races. Hispanic or Latino of any race were 1.7% of the population.

There were 1,006 households, of which 24.1% had children under the age of 18 living with them, 28.9% were married couples living together, 15.7% had a female householder with no husband present, 4.0% had a male householder with no wife present, and 51.4% were non-families. 45.2% of all households were made up of individuals, and 23.3% had someone living alone who was 65 years of age or older. The average household size was 1.99 and the average family size was 2.74.

The median age in the city was 44.3 years. 20.7% of residents were under the age of 18; 8.8% were between the ages of 18 and 24; 21% were from 25 to 44; 25.2% were from 45 to 64; and 24.3% were 65 years of age or older. The gender makeup of the city was 42.9% male and 57.1% female.

=== 2000 census ===
As of the census of 2000, there were 1,926 people, 833 households, and 475 families living in the city. The population density was 1,447.6 inhabitants per square mile (558.9/km^{2}). There were 916 housing units at an average density of 688.5 per square mile (265.8/km^{2}). The racial makeup of the city was 95.17% White, 0.10% African American, 0.52% Native American, 2.60% Asian, 0.16% from other races, and 1.45% from two or more races. Hispanic or Latino of any race were 0.73% of the population.

There were 833 households, out of which 29.7% had children under the age of 18 living with them, 38.8% were married couples living together, 14.5% had a female householder with no husband present, and 42.9% were non-families. 37.9% of all households were made up of individuals, and 18.1% had someone living alone who was 65 years of age or older. The average household size was 2.24 and the average family size was 2.95.

In the city, 25.6% of the population was under the age of 18, 8.6% from 18 to 24, 30.5% from 25 to 44, 19.7% from 45 to 64, and 15.6% was 65 years of age or older. The median age was 35 years. For every 100 females, there were 89.6 males. For every 100 females age 18 and over, there were 82.4 males.

The median income for a household in the city was $30,132, and the median income for a family was $35,385. Males had a median income of $30,677 versus $21,343 for females. The per capita income for the city was $17,852. About 9.9% of families and 14.0% of the population were below the poverty line, including 18.4% of those under age 18 and 15.7% of those age 65 or over.

== Education ==
West Branch-Rose City Area Schools is a local public school district. Residents are served by Surline Elementary and Middle Schools, as well as by Ogemaw Heights High School, which serves both West Branch and Rose City. The high school's mascot is the falcon. Saint Joseph Catholic School is a private parochial elementary school in West Branch, serving students from preschool through eighth grade. It is affiliated with the Diocese of Gaylord of the Roman Catholic Church, and is a member of the National Catholic Educational Association. Post-secondary education in the area is provided by Kirtland Community College.

== Medical facilities ==
MyMichigan Medical Center – West Branch (formerly West Branch Regional Medical Center before April 2, 2018) is located on 2463 S. M-30. They offer many different specialties, such as rehabilitation programs, condition-specific educational sources, and a wound care center. The rehabilitation programs offered range from neurological to physical. The three main programs offered are physical therapy, occupational therapy, and speech therapy. A couple of the physical therapy treatments offered are post-surgical hip rehabilitation and even a weight management program. Their occupational therapy program offers functional capacity evaluations and shoulder pain and post-surgical shoulder rehabilitation. Speech therapy programs help with speech and cognitive disorders and also swallowing disorders.

The Wound Care Center at West Branch Regional Medical Center offers many opportunities to patients who suffer from non-healing wounds or from chronic pain related to a wound. This program offers treatment such as debridement, specialized wound dressings, compression therapy, bio-engineered skin grafts, and hyperbaric oxygen therapy.

On July 1, 2010, West Branch Regional Medical Center closed its obstetrics ward, no longer serving expectant mothers in the community. No other units were anticipated to close at the time, and expectant mothers were referred to nearby hospitals in cities like Tawas, Saginaw, Midland, or Bay City for delivery, after consulting with their physician. On March 1, 2021, MidMichigan Medical Center – West Branch reopened its obstetrics ward with a virtual grand reopening.

== Local activities and attractions ==
West Branch contains Irons Park, a city park established in 1955 and named for former landowner Archie Irons. Many events are held in the park yearly, including an Easter egg hunt, the Humane Society Mutt March, the Summer Music Series, the Victorian Art Fair, a fishing derby, and duck races, to name a few. The park is also the home of Fort Austin, named in memory of Austin Clark, which consists of a large, complex, modern, wooden play-scape. The park has many activities available, including biking, fishing, bird-watching, and many children's activities; the park also has two tennis courts, basketball courts, picnic tables, grills, and two bathroom facilities. In the winter, Irons Park is often used for sledding.

In 2014, the John Tolfree Hospital installed the Tolfree Wellness Park on the West Branch Regional Medical Center’s campus. This was the first step to WBRMC's Go Outside! project to address childhood obesity in poverty-stricken families. The park houses a 3.3 mile trail, gardens, a greenhouse, and a pavilion. The park also sponsors the Soles for Cardio Run/Walk to promote fun and healthy lifestyles; all proceeds go to health and wellness programs at the medical center and to help maintain the Tolfree Wellness Park.

West Branch also has two bowling alleys, Ogemaw Lanes and Hi-Skore. West Branch Cinema 3, the local movie theater, is located in the downtown Victorian district. Special seasonal activities also abound in the area. Kirtland Community College hosts the R.O.A.R. (Rock Out Against Rape) Battle of the Bands to benefit Grayling's River House shelter, which serves survivors and victims of domestic violence and sexual abuse in Crawford, Ogemaw, Oscoda, and Roscommon counties. In February, West Branch is home to the Ogemaw County Winterfest. The Ogemaw County Fair is held on the third week in August on Rifle River Trail, just 8 miles east of the city. During the last week of July, West Branch hosts Relay for Life in Irons Park, supporting the fight against breast cancer, raising money for charities, and increasing awareness of breast cancer.

== Notable people ==
- Catherine Laurion, Miss Michigan Teen USA 2005 and first runner-up in the national Miss Teen USA 2005 pageant
- Alex Rose, athlete who represented Samoa at the 2016 and 2020 Summer Olympics
- Dita Von Teese, vedette, burlesque dancer, model, and businesswoman, known as the "Queen of Burlesque"
- Dave Walter, former NFL quarterback for the Cincinnati Bengals
- Daniel Way, comic book writer, known for his work on Wolverine: Origins and Deadpool
- Joy Williams, singer and songwriter who performed as half of the duo The Civil Wars
- Donny Winter, Pushcart Prize nominated poet
- Anthony Zettel, NFL defensive end who played for several teams and is currently a free agent

== Images ==
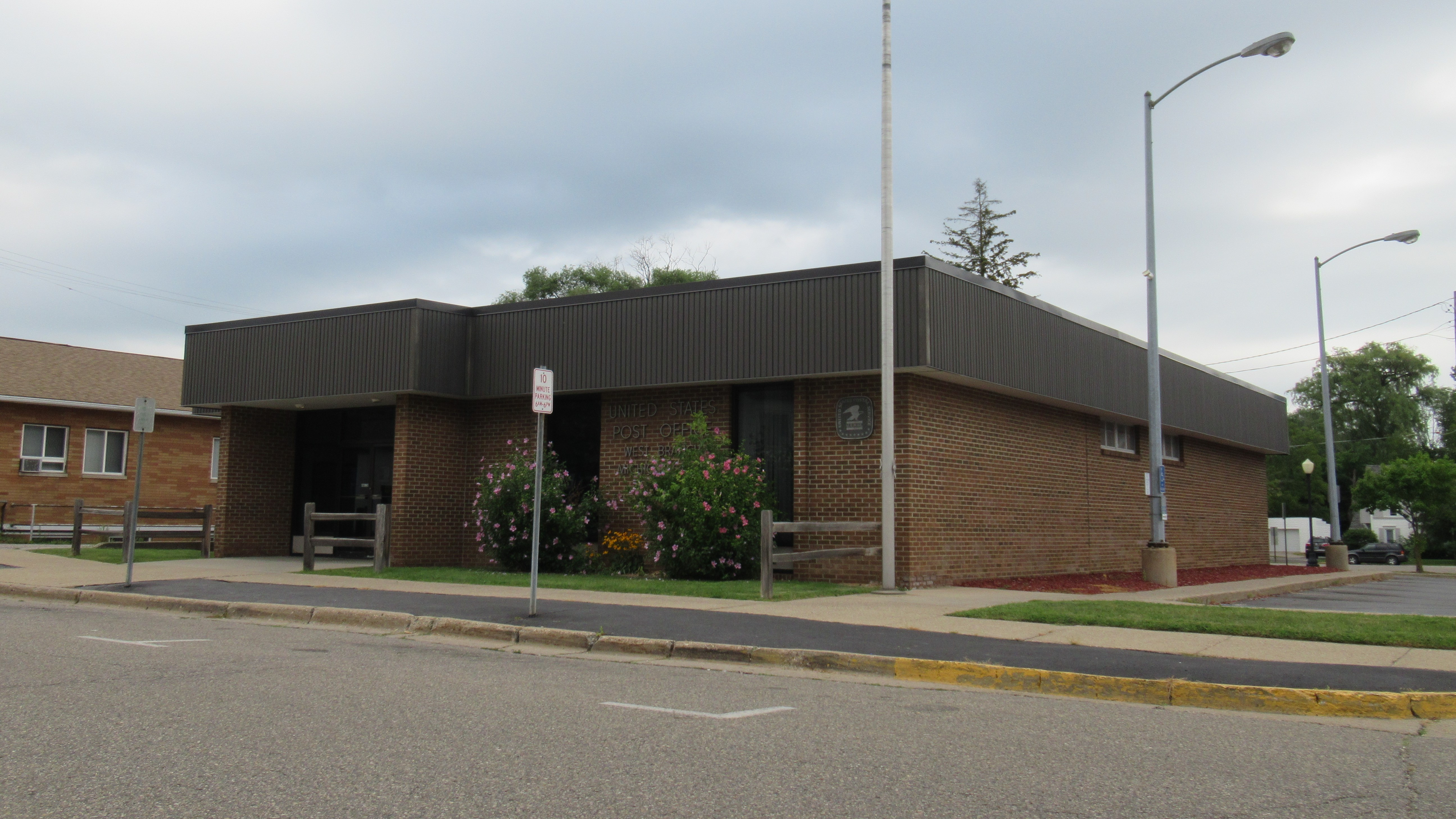
U.S. Post Office in West Branch

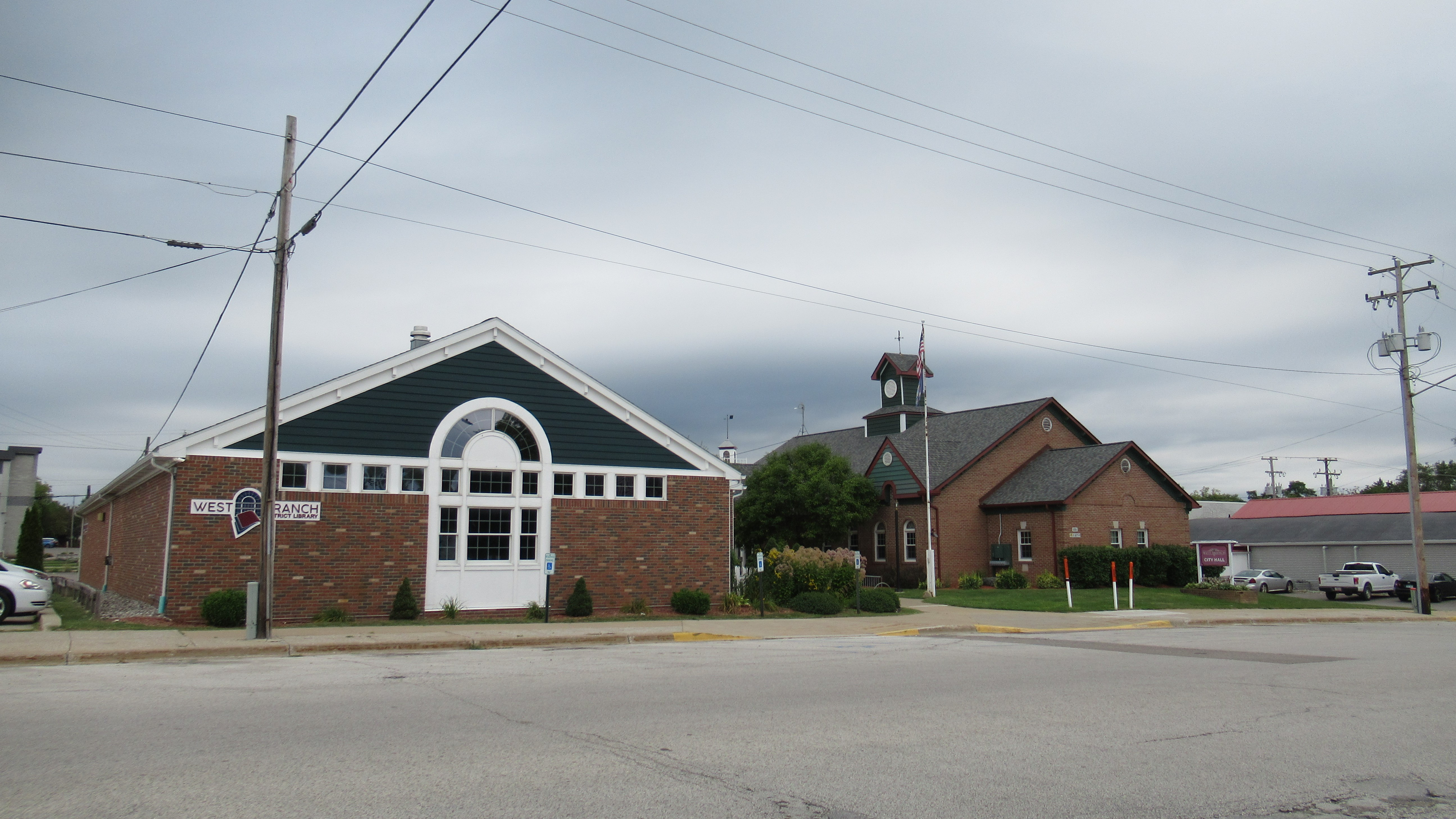
West Branch Library and City Hall

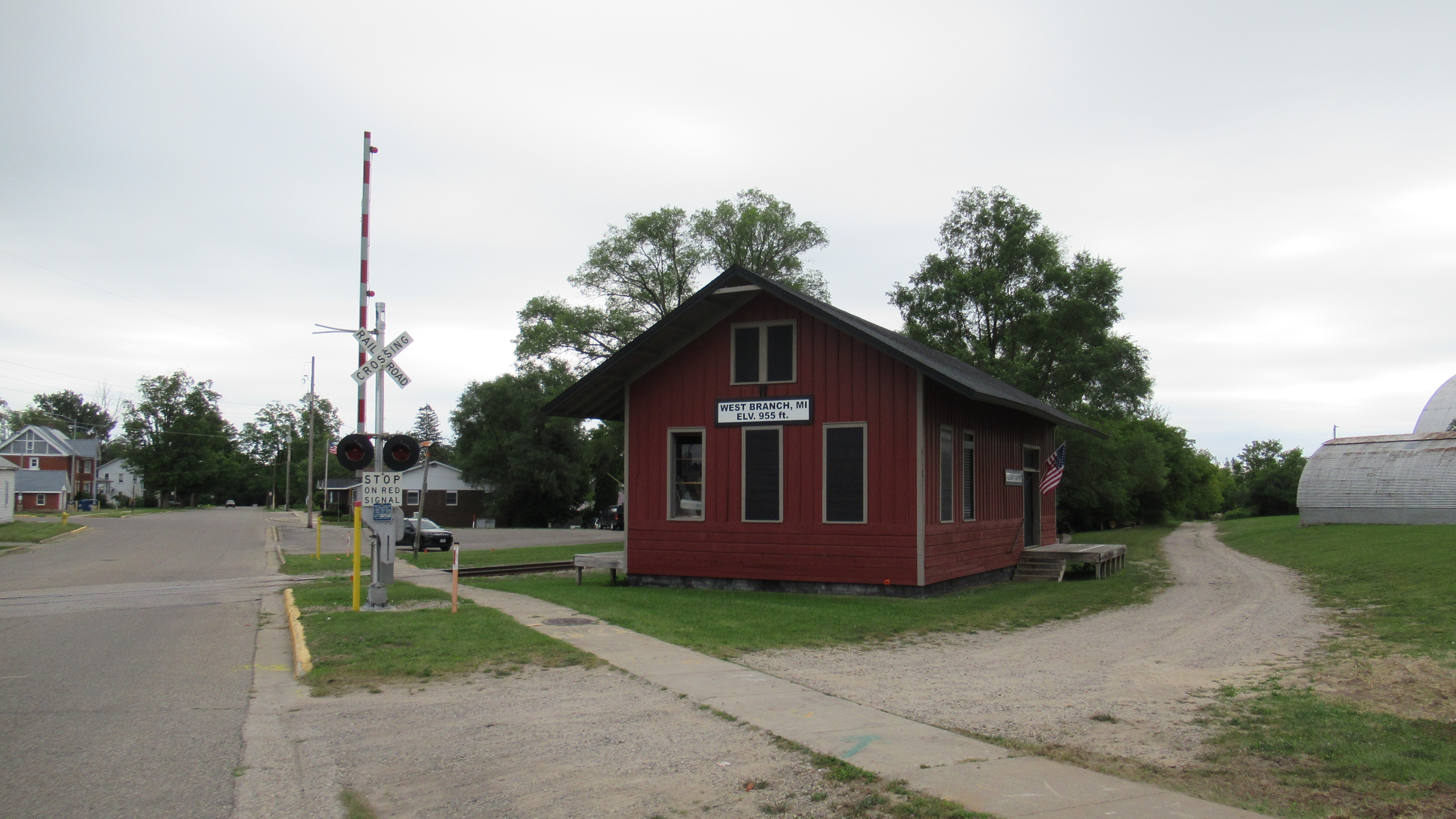
Former West Branch train depot
