= Romulus (comics) =

Marvel Comics supervillain

- Variant cover art for Wolverine: Origins #40. Art by Simone Bianchi

Publication information
- Publisher: Marvel Comics
- First appearance: Wolverine (vol. 3) #50 (March 2007) (shadowed); Wolverine: Origins #39 (August 2009) (Full appearance)
- Created by: Jeph Loeb (writer); Simone Bianchi (artist)

In-story information
- Species: Human mutant
- Team affiliations: Weapon X
- Abilities: Adamantium laced skeleton and claws Regenerative healing factor Superhuman senses, strength, stamina, speed, agility, reflexes, endurance and longevity Animalistic traits Telepathy; Skilled combatant and strategist

Romulus is a supervillain appearing in American comic books published by Marvel Comics. The character is featured in particular in those titles featuring Wolverine. He is a mutant and the leader of the Lupines, a species resembling humans that he claims evolved from canines instead of primates through convergent evolution. A shadowy character whose origin and motives remain a mystery, he is shown to have orchestrated most major events in the life of Wolverine, manipulating and controlling him for most of his life.

== Publication history ==
Created by writer Jeph Loeb and artist Simone Bianchi, the character first appeared obscured by shadow in Wolverine (vol. 3) #50 (March 2007), and made his first full appearance in Wolverine: Origins #39 (August 2009).

== Fictional character biography ==
Romulus is first seen in several flashbacks that Wolverine experiences, later explained by Wild Child to have been induced by Romulus himself. He is shown leading the Lupines in prehistoric and barbaric times, being an emperor in Ancient Rome, as well as being the main force behind Weapon X.

Romulus took Daken from his dead mother's womb and raised him as a ruthless killer. Nick Fury revealed to Wolverine that Romulus has been manipulating people from his family's bloodline for centuries, and that he plans for Daken to become the next-generation Weapon X.

After Wolverine subdues Omega Red, he is captured by Wild Child, who reveals that Romulus made Logan and several villains battle each other, his agenda being vaguely described as him needing a successor. After Wolverine uses the Muramasa blade to kill Omega Red, Romulus reveals himself in front of him, prepared for battle with his claws extended. Wolverine attacks Romulus but is easily overpowered since he is only using the sword at this point. Romulus slashes and attacks Wolverine from the shadows as he reveals his plans. Telling Wolverine that everything has led up to this moment. Romulus is what Wolverine will become. Pushing Wolverine to the breaking point, he drops the sword and pops his claws, much to Romulus' amusement. However, Wolverine fights back and gains the upper hand. Wolverine defeats Romulus, but leaves him alive saying that he will return when he is ready to finish the job.

Wolverine decides to confront Romulus one last time, with the help of various other heroes and his son Daken. As Daken is about to kill Romulus, Logan has Cloak teleport him into the Darkforce dimension. Wolverine considers killing Romulus, but decides to leave him stranded in the Darkforce.

However, thanks to Sabretooth's blackmailing life of Dagger, Romulus gets free from his prison. After a losing fight against Romulus, a mysterious woman with long red hair appears and tells Wolverine that the answers that he seeks are at the Weapon X facility. Following his fight with the Sabretooth clones, the mysterious woman appears to Wolverine again. She calls herself Remus and informs him that Romulus is her twin brother. Remus reveals to Wolverine that the Lupines were an elaborate hoax by Romulus to hide his real goal of creating a master race of mutants artificially enhanced by adamantium.

After tracking Romulus to his stronghold in Italy, Wolverine brutally attacks and incapacitates Sabretooth before confronting Romulus. Wolverine finds Romulus immersed within a tank similar to the one Wolverine was held in during the days of the Weapon X program. Wolverine breaks open the tank and mutilates Romulus' face, revealing that his bones have been bonded with adamantium. As Romulus heals, Wolverine asks what the purpose is of becoming an imitation of him. Romulus declares that he is not as he once was, as he has "taken the best from both Wolverine and Sabretooth". Romulus and Wolverine resume their battle with Wolverine ultimately proving victorious, resulting in Romulus being remanded to the Raft.

Romulus escapes from the Raft and joins forces with a mass of sentient adamantine to destroy all traces of adamantium throughout the world. Believing that killing Wolverine will make himself a worthy champion for the Adamantine, Romulus has the metal possess and transform Cyber, Lady Deathstrike, Constrictor and Donald Pierce. However, the Adamantine rejects Romulus and possesses Hercules, who kills Romulus.

== Powers and abilities ==
Little is known about the full extent of Romulus's powers. Like Wolverine, Romulus' primary power is an accelerated healing factor that allows him to rapidly regenerate from injury. Romulus' healing factor grants him virtual immunity to known diseases and renders him highly resistant to most forms of drugs. It also affords him greatly extended longevity by slowing his natural aging process to an extraordinary degree as he claims to be tens of thousands of years old. While he shows signs of aging, Romulus maintains the physical vitality and overall appearance of his prime. Romulus' senses of sight, smell and hearing are also enhanced to unknown superhuman levels. While they constitute a separate power, their efficiency is still somewhat linked to his healing factor. He is strong enough to lift Wolverine by the arm over his head with one hand and hurl him across a room. Romulus' speed, agility, and reflexes are similarly enhanced. His healing factor grants him partial immunity to the fatigue toxins generated by his muscles during physical activity, so he has much greater stamina and endurance than an ordinary human. He also possesses a single, retractable claw at the tip of each finger as well as elongated canine teeth. Romulus' claws are extremely sharp and are capable of cutting most known conventional materials and flesh.

Romulus displayed telepathic abilities during his encounters with Wolverine. He was able to enter Wolverine's mind and manipulate his memories - either creating false memories or to awakening suppressed ones.

Romulus underwent the process of bonding adamantium to his skeleton, making his bones virtually indestructible. Romulus has also had four adamantium claws implanted into each arm that have the same configuration as the claws mounted onto his gloves. As with his skeleton, these claws are virtually unbreakable and can cut nearly any known substance.

=== Skills ===
Romulus is extremely intelligent with detailed knowledge of genetics and other areas of science. A master manipulator that prefers to work behind the scenes, he controls a vast criminal empire spread throughout the world and has contacts throughout the criminal underworld. He is also a formidable hand-to-hand combatant with many thousands of years of experience, and has extensive knowledge of many foreign and ancient cultures as he has alleged to have participated in the rise and fall of many civilizations throughout his existence.
