= Hellverine (comic book) =

Marvel Comics limited series

- The cover to Hellverine #1 (May 2024), art by Ryan Stegman, JP Mayer and Marte Gracia.

Publication information
- Publisher: Marvel Comics
- Schedule: Monthly
- Format: (vol. 1); Limited series (vol. 2); Ongoing series
- Genre: Superhero
- Publication date: (vol. 1); May 2024 – August 2024 (vol. 2); December 2024 – September 2025
- No. of issues: (vol. 1): 4 (vol. 2): 10
- Main character(s): Hellverine; Wolverine

Creative team
- Written by: Benjamin Percy
- Artist(s): (vol. 1); Julius Ohta (vol. 2); Raffaele Ienco
- Letterer: Travis Lanham
- Colorist(s): (vol. 1); Frank D'Armata (vol. 2); Bryan Valenza
- Editor(s): Drew Baumgartner; Mark Basso

Hellverine is the name of a comic book title starring the character Hellverine (Akihiro) and published by Marvel Comics. The title refers to the name of a demon-possessed Wolverine.

The title is a sequel to the "Ghost Rider/Wolverine: Weapons of Vengeance" crossover.

== Publication history ==
In the summer of 2023, the comic books Wolverine vol. 7 and Ghost Rider vol. 10, both written by Benjamin Percy, had a crossover named "Ghost Rider/Wolverine: Weapons of Vengeance." This crossover introduced the demon Bagra-ghul, who would then go on to possess Wolverine and become the "Hellverine."

In February 2024, it was announced that there would be a Hellverine four-issue mini-series, also to be written by Percy, with art by Julius Ohta. Per Percy: "Readers really responded to the killer concept of Logan with a flaming skull and flaming claws on a flaming motorcycle, which is as heavy metal as it gets." The demon Bagra-ghul returned, but this time it was not possessing Logan, but rather his son, Akihiro.

In August 2024, it was announced that there would be a Hellverine ongoing series spin-off, with Percy returning as a writer and art by Raffaele Ienco, which would launch in December 2024. According to Percy, "People started seeking out that first appearance issue. Marvel Legends rolled out a Hellverine toy. I was asked to do a mini-series. The mini-series sold well enough that I was then asked to do an ongoing. It feels something like a Cosmic Ghost Rider moment in terms of energy, trajectory. So thank you, fans and retailers. This is awesome. Hopefully, Hellverine will be a colorful part of the Marvel canon in the years to come."

== Plot synopsis ==
=== Volume I ===
After being sealed away by Wolverine and Ghost Rider, (Note: As depicted in Ghost Rider/Wolverine: Weapons of Vengeance Omega #1 (November 2023)) the demon Bagra-ghul breaks free from his prison and resurfaces in a new host body as Hellverine. However, due to Bagra-ghul being influenced by Wolverine's heroic and honorable thoughts during the time he possessed him, (Note: As depicted in Wolverine vol. 7 #36 (October 2023) and Ghost Rider/Wolverine: Weapons of Vengeance Omega #1 (November 2023)) Hellverine hunts down evil doers throughout North America and continues his ritual of erecting grotesque statues of his victims' remains in honor of Mephisto. Meanwhile, Project Hellfire has been taken over by US General Harms, who oversees the creation of a group of Hellish super soldiers called the Destroyers from the bodies of five dead soldiers. When the Destroyers awaken, they immediately rampage throughout The Pentagon, until they are confronted and stopped by Hellverine, resulting in the deaths of two Destroyers. Harms and his men seek out Wolverine to question him over Hellverine's identity; when reviewing Harms' battle footage, Logan realizes Hellverine is his son Akihiro, who had previously been killed by Sabretooth. (Note: As depicted in Wolverine vol. 7 #41 (January 2024))

Bagra-ghul resurrected Akihiro at his gravesite in the North Pole, due to being drawn to Akihiro's similar scent as Logan's. Despite his resurrection, Akihiro is left amnesiac and Bagra-ghul compels him to hunt after the Destroyers. Desperate to reclaim the Destroyers as they are vital to his plans to usurp the US Government in order to fulfill his prior pact with Hell, Harms proposes an alliance with Logan. Disgusted and distrusting of Harms, Logan refuses and seeks out the Destroyers on his own in order to find his son. Meanwhile, Lieutenant Colonel Leon Townsend recognizes the Destroyers as his former squad mates after watching them on television. Logan manages to find one Destroyer at his former home but is forced to kill him when the Destroyer nearly kills his living family.

Townsend confronts General Harms at Project Hellfire's lab and demands to be turned into a Destroyer, believing that he could put a stop to their rampage. Harms meets with the secretary of state, who had been secretly funding Project Hellfire, until they are attacked by the two remaining Destroyers and one of them kills the Secretary. Hellverine appears and kills one Destroyer, but is shot and gravely wounded by Harms with a holy-water laced bullet. Logan arrives to find his son on the ground dying and takes Bagra-ghul back into his own body, believing that would save him. Instead, the act turns Akihiro into a desiccated corpse.

Dr. Spivey of Project Hellfire converts Townsend into a Destroyer, while Logan returns Bagra-ghul to Akihiro's body, bringing him back to life and restoring his memories. Despite Logan's insistence to leave, Akihiro resolves to put a stop to Project Hellfire. Harms orders Spivey to resurrect the Secretary as a Destroyer and after empowering himself with demonic energy, takes the converted Secretary with him to the Capitol Building to begin his demonic takeover. Meanwhile, Townsend finds the remaining Destroyer and convinces him to stand down. Hellverine and Wolverine track down Harms and kill him and the Secretary with the help of Townsend, the last Destroyer. Akihiro decides to leave Project Hellfire under the care of Spivey and the Destroyers. Akihrio and Logan part ways, Akihiro telling him he'll "catch him down the road."

=== Volume II ===
Despite his efforts, Akihiro struggles with containing Bagra-ghul, who influences him into hunting down evildoers for his rituals throughout the country. Akihiro is plagued by nightmares fueled from his traumatic past and fears of losing control of himself to Bagra-ghul, causing him to develop an existential crisis. Desperate for help, Hellverine seeks out Doctor Strange at the Sanctum Santorum; although Strange is no longer the Sorcerer Supreme, he reluctantly agrees to help. Frustrated by Strange's apparent lack of urgency, Akihiro forces him to read into his memories; Strange is shocked by what his witnesses. Strange reveals that Bagra-ghul is not fully reformed as believed and that the demon remains loyal to Mephisto, who has his own plans for Hellverine. Believing that this would put Akihiro at ease, Strange tasks him with uncovering Mephisto's plot, starting by sending Hellverine to the North Pole where Bagra-ghul had resurrected him. While investigating X-Force's abandoned Greenhouse, Hellverine encounters Evan, the lone survivor of a group of mutants who have taken refuge. Hellverine learns from Evan that a portal leading to Hell had been created at his resurrection site and was influencing mutant refugees into erecting a monument of corpses to empower Hell's influence onto Earth. Hellverine and Evan manage to destroy the monument despite resistance from the demon-possessed refugees and Bagra-ghul briefly taking over Akihiro's body; despite their success Evan is dragged into Hell. Akihiro despairs over his failure to save Evan and the refugees as Strange arrives to inform him that the magic being summoned from Hell is targeting mutants.

Back at the Sanctum Sanctorum, Strange reveals that every source of Hell magic targeting mutants throughout the world are all sites of Akihiro's personal tragedy, with Akihiro's suffering being used by Mephisto as a conduit for his power, and that the atrocities committed by the mutants under the influence is fueling more anti-mutant sentiment. As only Akihiro alone can stop Mephisto, Strange sends him off to continue his journey and provides him with the Book of Lamentation to decipher Bagra-ghul's ciphers. A week later, Akhiro travels to Jasmine Falls, Japan, where his mother Itsu was murdered many decades ago. Akihiro is accosted by the villagers, whose leader Haru informs him that a mysterious demonic entity named "Mother" had been kidnapping children from the village. When Haru's son Botan falls under Mother's thrall and flees towards the forest, Akihiro and Haru give chase and discover that Mother is Itsu, resurrected as a demon by Mephisto. Hellverine is forced to kill Itsu to end her suffering, freeing all the kidnapped children from her influence; Haru gifts Akihiro with an omamori as thanks. Akihrio later tracks down another demonic epicenter to Genosha, where Wolverine had previously drowned him in the past. (Note: As depicted in Uncanny X-Force #34 (November 2012)) While Hellverine encounters a group of anti-mutant bigots called the No-Mans, a demonic clone of him manifests from a nearby puddle, which kills several No-Mans and begins drowning Hellverine while a vision of Mephisto reveals himself to Akihiro.

Mephisto drags Akihiro to Hell, where he extracts Bagra-ghul from his body and proceeds to torture him. Mephisto reveals his goal of turning mutantkind into his own personal army on Earth by exploiting their evolving powers and humanity's fear and hatred of them and offers Akihiro the choice of either serving him as his most loyal servant or continue suffering eternal torture for his sins. Out of atonement for his past and for the sake of others, Akihro chooses to defy Mephisto. Drawing a demonic cipher he learned from the Book of Lamentation, Akihiro gains complete control over Bagra-ghul and absorbs him back into his body, allowing him to completely resist Mephisto's influence before attacking him. Unable to control Hellverine anymore, Mephisto casts him out of Hell. Akihiro finds himself back in Genosha, where Dr. Spivey is waiting for him and requests his aid with helping Project Hellfire with another problem.

Akihiro is taken back to the Pentangle, Project Hellfire's headquarters underneath Arlington National Cemetery and is introduced to their new half demon chief analyst, Severith. Severith explains that sometime been Bagra-ghul's release and Akihiro's resurrection, the disembodied body parts of a demon called the Hell Hulk emerged throughout Earth and have been causing those within range of each piece to fall into uncontrollable rages and murder. Due to his ability to sense the Hell Hulk while resisting his influence, Hellverine works with the Destroyers into recovering the pieces of the Hell Hulk. After the Hell Hulk's body is reassembled—while his head is kept separated to prevent him from awakening—Akihiro attempts to read his memories but is left severely weakened after being exposed to the Hell Hulk's radiation for too long. While he recovers, Akihiro is ambushed by Severith, who reveals himself as the Hell Hulk's creator, and traps Akihiro within a magic prison to prevent him from interfering with the Hell Hulk's awakening. While trapped, Akihiro sees a vision of the Hell Hulk's origin, in which shortly after his creation he nearly killed Mephisto in a fit of uncontrollable rage until Mephisto summoned Bagra-ghul from the prison Wolverine and Ghost Rider previously sealed him in to save him; after Bagra-ghul cut the Hell Hulk into pieces Mephisto had ordered him to spread the demon's parts throughout Earth, which infuriated Severith. Akihiro manages to free himself but is too late to stop Severith and the Hell Hulk from destroying the Pentangle and leaving a wake of destruction across Washington, D.C..

Due to the public fallout, the Pentagon threatens to shut down Project Hellfire and orders Hellverine and the Destroyers to remain at the Pentangle's ruins. While investigating Severith's private quarters, Akihiro discovers that Severith was tortured by Mephisto as punishment for the Hell Hulk realizes that Severith plans to lure Mephisto to Earth—where he will be weaker—to kill him and usurp him as the new king of Hell. Akihiro is visited by his former lover Aurora and while discussing their relationship and recent events, Akihiro deduces that Severith is traveling to Hell's Backbone in Utah—Project Hellfire's original site. Aurora leaves but when she fails to return, a worried Hellverine defies his orders and travels to Utah. Upon arriving, Hellverine discovers a pocket dimension between Hell and Earth and encounters Mephisto. Mephisto reveals that he captured Aurora and forces Hellverine into working with him to stop Severith together.

Hellverine and Mephisto confront Severith and the Hell Hulk, who have opened a gateway to hell and summoned a horde of demons. Although Hellverine manages to slay the demons, Severith uses his magic to restrain him while Mephisto is nearly overwhelmed by the Hell Hulk. Serverith attempts to extract Bagra-ghul from Akihiro to kill him, but is stopped by the recovered Destroyers and Aurora—who was never captured by Mephisto. Mephisto drags the Hell Hulk to Hell with him while Hellverine re-absorbs Bagra-ghul and incinerates Severith to death with his hellfire. With the crisis averted, Akihiro celebrates this victory with his friends and accepts his identity as Hellverine.

== Collected editions ==
The first volume was collected into a trade paperback:

- Hellverine: Resurrection (112 pages, January 2025, ISBN 9781302959982)

The second volume will be collected into two trade paperbacks:

- Hellverine Vol. 1: Lost Highways (120 pages, August 2025, ISBN 9781302964498)
- Hellverine Vol. 2: Hell Hulk Unleashed (112 pages, January 2026, ISBN 9781302964559)

== Reception ==
=== Volume I ===
AIPT.com gave the first issue an 8.5 out of 10 and stated, "The biggest selling point is the blend of action and horror. This issue does not skimp on gore or adult themes while offering a cool yet haunting flaming Wolverine. Given how hard Percy and Co have gone with grotesque visuals, you know this series won't disappoint. The blend of action and horror is quite good." They gave the second issue a 9.5 out of 10 and said, "Hellverine melds superheroes and horror perfectly with grisly sights and delightful monstrous creations." They gave the third issue an 8.5 out of ten and said it was a "another shockingly good horror fest."

ComicBook.com stated, "It's still goofy in how the story addresses occult-based government cover-up, cannibalistic aristocracies, twisted priests and undead soldiers infused with Hell-based energy (the DOOM franchise would like a word...) with complete seriousness. But artist Julius Ohta has an absolute blast bringing it all to life in his artwork. The biggest beneficiaries are Hellverine himself and the aforementioned undead soldiers, who look like the answer to the question, 'What if Jigsaw designed a team of Cenobites?'"

Comic-Watch.com gave the second issue a 7.9 out of 10 and stated, "Hellverine is much more than an excuse to bring back a flaming Wolverine. The first issue introduced a multi-layered plot that gave Logan multiple reasons to be involved. Hellverine #2 elevates the series by connecting the plot emotionally to the various characters involved, especially Logan. The result is an even more engrossing story–one that still features a flaming Wolverine." They gave the third issue an 8.1 out of 10 and stated, "Hellverine's visual intensity remains the series' key selling point. But the narrative impresses more and more with each issue."
