= Daken =

Marvel Comics character

- Akihiro as he appears on the cover of Daken: Dark Wolverine #1. Art by Giuseppe Camuncoli.

Publication information
- Publisher: Marvel Comics
- First appearance: As Daken: Cameo: Wolverine Origins #5 (August 2006); Full appearance: Wolverine Origins #10 (January 2007); As Wolverine: Dark Avengers #1 (March 2009); As Horsemen of Death: Uncanny Avengers #9 (June 2013); As Fang: Marauders vol. 2 #7 (October 2022); As Hellverine: Hellverine #1 (May 2024)
- Created by: Daniel Way (writer); Steve Dillon (artist)

In-story information
- Alter ego: Akihiro
- Species: Human mutant
- Team affiliations: Dark Avengers; Dark X-Men; Brotherhood of Mutants; Horsemen of Death; X-Factor; Marauders; Alpha Flight; X-Force
- Notable aliases: Wolverine, "Daken Akihiro", Death, Fang, Hellverine
- Abilities: Skilled martial artist; Regenerative healing; Retractable claws; Enhanced senses; Pheromone manipulation; Superhuman strength, speed, stamina, agility, reflexes, endurance, and durability; Fire and hellfire generation; Use of an enchanted motorcycle; Mystical chain projection; Sin perception; Supernatural awareness; Dark magic

Daken (Akihiro) is a fictional character appearing in American comic books published by Marvel Comics. Akihiro was created by writer Daniel Way and artist Steve Dillon and first appeared in Wolverine: Origins #5 (August 2006).

Akihiro is the mutant son of Wolverine and his deceased wife Itsu, possessing superhuman abilities similar to his father (e.g., healing factor, retractable claws) as well as pheromone manipulating powers. Raised by Romulus as a ruthless killer, Akihiro was conditioned to hate Wolverine, blaming his father for his supposed abandonment, his mother's death and traumatic childhood and took his childhood slur Daken as his codename. Akihiro was a member of the Dark Avengers under his father's moniker Wolverine, the Brotherhood of Mutants and at one point was a Horseman of Death. Originally depicted as a supervillain and antihero, Akihiro later reforms himself as a superhero after relocating to Krakoa, making peace with his father and becoming a member of X-Factor and the Marauders, eventually earning the title of Fang for his heroism. After becoming bonded to the demon Bagra-ghul, Akihiro becomes the newest Hellverine.

== Publication history ==
=== Creation and Wolverine: Origins ===
Akihiro first appeared in Wolverine: Origins #10 (March 2007), created by writer Daniel Way and artist Steve Dillon. Regarding Akihiro's role in Wolverine: Origins and his relationship with his father, Way stated that whereas Logan is attempting to "take control of his destiny", Akihiro is heading down the opposite direction, "hacking, slashing and going nuts". He also stated that what Akihiro needs in his life is guidance, something that Logan is struggling to offer him. But in order to achieve that they first must kill Romulus. Additionally, Way revealed that Akihiro's role would increase in 2009 and that by the end of Wolverine: Origins, his past would intentionally remain open to provide a "fertile ground for years ... worth of stories". In addition to appearing in Origins, and the fourth volume of the definitive Wolverine title, Akihiro was also given a solo series, Daken: Dark Wolverine. The series ran for 23 issues.

=== Dark Avengers ===
Following the conclusion of his story arc in Wolverine: Origins and the events of Dark Reign, Akihiro became a member of Norman Osborn's Dark Avengers and took up the mantle Wolverine in Dark Avengers #1 (March 2009). Regarding his use of Akihiro on the team and the character's motivation for joining the Dark Avengers, Brian Michael Bendis said:

Akihiro is one of the best things to come out of Origins, and what better way to piss off his father? He's an iconic and legacy character attached to a number of cool things in the Marvel Universe, but he really hasn't had a lot of face time with it. So we can really roll up our sleeves and see what we've got there and help create a character. I'm not taking anything away from Daniel Way, his creator, but I am saying once a character gets rolling it's interesting to see him interacting with different types of characters. You take him out of the Wolverine book to see what he's made of. It's much like with Wolverine, when you took him out of 'Hulk' [where he first appeared], he became something else.

During the Utopia crossover-event that lasted from June to September 2009, Osborn also assigned Akihiro as a member of the Dark X-Men. Matt Fraction, who wrote Akihiro in Dark Avengers / Uncanny X-Men: Utopia described Akihiro as erudite, cultured and flamboyant and as "the metrosexual Wolverine". Similarly to Bendis, Fraction stated that Akihiro's reasons for joining the Dark X-Men is both because he loves the attention and because it makes "his dad's blood boil". Akihiro remained a member of Osborn's team until Dark Avengers #16 (July 2010), where he managed to avoid capture.

=== Dark Wolverine and characterization ===
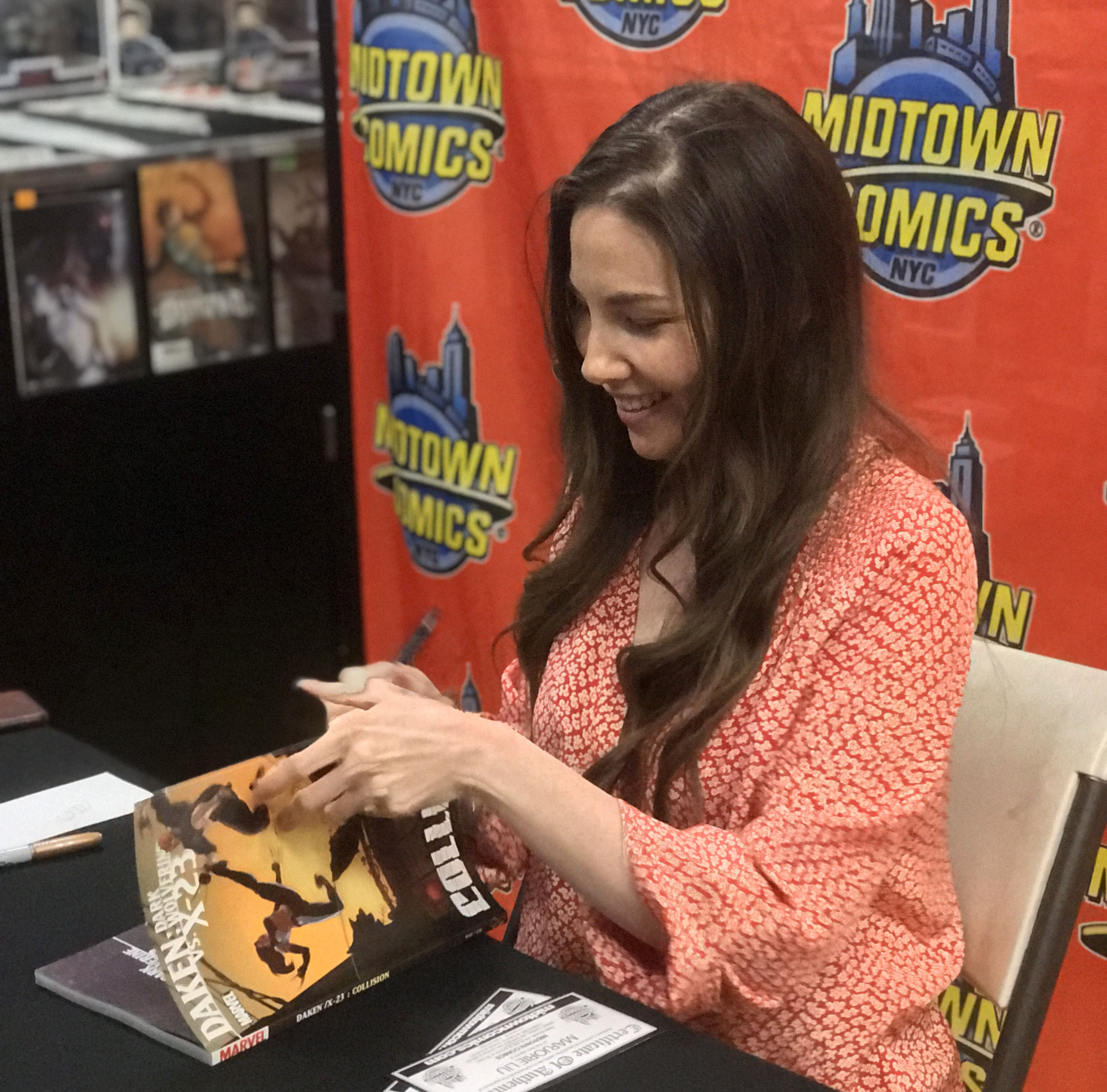
Writer Marjorie Liu autographing a copy of the Daken/X-23: Collision trade paperback at a signing at Midtown Comics in Manhattan

In conjunction to his role on Dark Avengers, Akihiro also took over the starring role in the fourth volume of Wolverine starting with issue 75 (Aug. 2009), where it was retitled to Dark Wolverine. The series was co-written by Way and Marjorie Liu. Liu, who hadn't written Akihiro before, decided to work on the series after being asked by Way due to Akihiro being "slightly psychotic, highly intelligent, very manipulative and ha[ving] daddy issues", traits which she found interesting to work with as a writer. Way stated that while the Dark Avengers appear as supporting characters in the series, Dark Wolverine is about what Akihiro does while away from the team. He further described Dark Avengers as Akihiro's grand entry into the Marvel Universe and that while his joining the Avengers was not part of his original plan for the character, he feels that it fits with his initial plans of having Akihiro "get out into the world" and encounter other characters. Regarding the character's personal reasons for joining the team, Way stated that it allows Akihiro to pervert and destroy the legacy built by his father.

Regarding Akihiro's characterization, Liu described him as someone who is confident in his own abilities and superiority, despite never having actually tested them "on the world stage". But since taking up the mantle of Wolverine means being in the public eye, he gets to "live a little and spread his wings [and] face the fact that there are people just a bit better at the game than him". Way stated that Akihiro's goal is to not simply kill Romulus for the role he played in his mother's death but also to become the new Romulus. On whether Akihiro joining the Dark Avengers means he's being redeemed or not, Liu stated that in order for someone to want to achieve redemption, they first need to believe they've committed an act that requires atonement, and Akihiro doesn't feel any guilt for his past actions. She also described him as elegant, preferring to use his brains over his brawn. She further stated that Akihiro is unable to form meaningful relationships, with the ones he does form being based on how he can use the people around him. His father is the one exception, who manages to "ruffle his emotions".

=== All-New Wolverine and Iceman ===
Following the events of "Secret Wars", Akihiro made his first appearance in All-New Wolverine #25.

=== Krakoan Age, redemption and name changes ===
As part of the Krakoan Age of X-Men storyline, Akihiro was given a starring role in X-Factor during the "Dawn of X" relaunch, with X-Factor writer Leah Williams explaining that Akihiro's inclusion was due to the team needing a "fucky thot enforcer". After X-Factor's cancelation, Akihiro would later star in 2022's Marauders series during the "Destiny of X" relaunch.

X-Factor and Marauders showcased Akihiro overcoming his villainous past and carving a more heroic identity for himself, ultimately culminating in Akihiro making peace with his father and dropping the pejorative "Daken" in favor of the honorific "Fang". Marauders writer Steve Orlando, acknowledging the discomfort with the name "Daken" and the derivativeness of "Dark Wolverine", said of Akihiro's name change and character development:

So he wanted to earn something. And as a character who, since Leah Williams had been working with him before, has sort of been trying to figure out how to rectify all that he's been through, all these toxic emotions, having a name that is really his, felt like the right moment. So it's a confluence as always of history and story, but also it's what felt right for the character. He doesn't want to be Wolverine's kid anymore. He doesn't want to be Wolverine's arch enemy. He needs something that is his own and making this an honorific within the Lupak culture just felt right. Specifically calling it honorific is something we did that was additive, but it's already been established that when someone in the Imperial Guard is killed, they get replaced by someone who suspiciously looks almost just like them. So what we did was build off what was there to give Akihiro something that was truly his own.

In 2023, Fang appeared in the Alpha Flight limited series, which was part of the "Fall of X" relaunch. In January 2024, Fang was killed off in Wolverine (vol. 7) #41, written by Victor LaValle and Benjamin Percy and drawn by Geoff Shaw and Cory Smith; Akihiro's death is used as a catalyst for the "Sabretooth War" storyline. Later that May, the first issue of the Hellverine miniseries written by Percy and drawn by Julius Ohta would reveal a resurrected Akihiro to be the true identity of the titular protagonist as a plot twist.

=== Hellverine and new solo series ===
After the Hellverine miniseries concluded in August 2024, it was announced that Hellverine would be starring in another self titled ongoing series beginning in December, with Percy returning as writer and Raffaele Ienco taking over for art. The new ongoing would focus on Akihiro embracing his new identity and struggling with his co-dependency with the demon Bagra-ghul while under the tutelage of Doctor Strange. Percy elaborated that moral complications would be the defining trait of the new series, which would delve into Akihiro's past history as a supervillain, and confirmed that Akihiro's love interest Aurora and other members of his friends and family and the supporting cast from the mini series would be making appearances along with hinting at Mephisto's involvement as a major antagonist.

Hellverine was intended to appear in the ongoing series Spirits of Violence in March 2025 until the series was canceled a month before its release. However, it was announced in July that Spirits of Violence would be revived as a five-issue limited series, set for an October release.

In October 2025, it was announced that Hellverine would appear in the ongoing series Inglorious X-Force as a new member of X-Force. Set for January 2026 release, the series will be written by Tim Seeley and illustrated by Michael Sta. Maria and will be part of the "Shadows of Tomorrow" event. Hellverine's inclusion to the book was done at the suggestion of Editor Mark Basso, which Steely was initially reluctant to do but relented after Jordan Blum and former Akihiro writers Orlando and Percy vouched for the character.

In September 2026, Marvel announced that Hellverine would return in Fugitive X-Force, a five-issue limited series continuing the events of Inglorious X-Force. Written by Seeley and illustrated by Áthila Fabbio, the series is scheduled to debut in December and follows Hellverine and his teammates as they go on the run after being framed for a crime, with Boom-Boom assuming leadership following Cable's disappearance.

=== Sexual orientation ===
Akihiro has been portrayed as bisexual, having engaged in sexual situations with both men and women. Akihiro kissed a man in Wolverine: Origins #11; however the encounter also served to further toy with a woman he had been romantically seeing and later, Akihiro killed the man in question. In Dark Wolverine #75 it is vaguely suggested Akihiro has had a sexual encounter with a male employee of Norman Osborn, but this was also shown as a means to access top-secret files. Later in the same issue, Akihiro makes a pass at Mac Gargan, but the context is ambiguous, possibly facetious. In the same issue, Akihiro uses his pheromones to "engage" a female H.A.M.M.E.R. agent. In Dark Avengers #7, Akihiro humorously states how he "...always did like playing for both teams", a double entendre referencing bisexuality and his membership in both the Dark Avengers and Dark X-Men. In Dark Wolverine #76, Akihiro uses his pheromones in order to manipulate the Thing, goading him with homoerotic remarks. During the Siege of Asgard, Akihiro also made a flirtatious pass at Bullseye dressed as Hawkeye, and kisses him on-panel. In Dark Reign: Young Avengers #5, Akihiro attempts to uses his pheromones during a fight against Hulkling, a gay male superhero. Akihiro has also been shown on numerous occasions engaging in heterosexual behavior and sleeping with female characters. In X-Factor, Akihiro expresses romantic interest in his female teammate, Aurora, who eventually reciprocates and enters a relationship with him after realizing his feelings for her are genuine.

At the 2009 San Diego Comic-Con, Marjorie Liu, commenting on Akihiro's sexuality, stated that "[Akihiro] will do anyone and anything [to achieve his goals] and he's past that kind of identification. He's beyond it". Daniel Way added that Akihiro's sexuality will be addressed later on, but it's more about his personality. "He's no more homosexual than he is heterosexual. It's about control". Liu later confirmed Akihiro's bisexuality in a 2011 video interview with Newsarama.

== Fictional character biography ==
=== Introduction and meeting his father: Wolverine: Origins (2007-2009) ===
In 1946 as Wolverine is living in Jasmine Falls, Japan with his pregnant wife Itsu, Romulus sends the Winter Soldier to kill Itsu. After Itsu's death, a mysterious man cuts the baby from his mother's womb, leaving her body lying on the floor. The infant survives this incident due to his mutant healing factor. Sometime in 1946, he is placed at the doorstep of Akihira and Natsumi, a wealthy young and traditional Japanese couple. They take his presence as an answer to their prayers and raise him as their own. Though he is named "Akihiro" by his father, the servants and other families of the province secretly refer to him as Daken (駄犬, "bastard dog" or "mongrel"), a slur on his obvious mixed heritage. As Akihiro grows, he is often teased by the other boys of the village. His harsh treatment over the years causes Akihiro to develop a very cold personality, directed at everyone except Akihira. One night, Natsumi confesses to Akihira that she does not love their adopted son and that, after long years of trying, she is pregnant. Akihiro overhears the talk and begins plotting. Within a year, after the birth of the baby, Akihiro confronts his mother and tells her that he has killed her son. Upon learning this, Akihira is furious and disowns Akihiro, who angrily responds that Akihiro is not his true name anyway. Natsumi suddenly appears and tries to run him through, triggering the unsheathing of his mutant claws. He waves his arm, accidentally slashing Natsumi. Akihira, unable to force himself to harm his son, commits suicide. Romulus then appears to the boy for the first time and tells him that he is what the boy will someday become; Akihiro embraces his childhood slur Daken as his own name. Akihiro is trained harshly, including nannies who show motherlike love to him before trying to kill him, forcing Akihiro to kill them ("After the third one I stopped falling for it", he says).

In the present, Akihiro disguises himself as a S.H.I.E.L.D. agent and infiltrates a facility where his father is imprisoned. He stabs Dum Dum Dugan and confronts his father for the first time. He slashes Logan across the stomach and leaves him to bleed on the floor, just as his mother was left many years before. Akihiro is revealed to have "aided" his father's escape, though not for benevolent reasons.

He is next seen in Berlin at the home of a woman with whom he has been cruelly, and romantically, toying. He allowed her to witness him kissing another man on a date, although unbeknownst to her, he later murdered the man to acquire a passport. Knowing that she would drink an entire bottle of burgundy, he secretly poisons it, resulting in her death, so that no loose ends are left to tie him to his crimes.

While still in Germany, Akihiro is contacted by an anonymous messenger who reminds him of his displeased master's "ultimate goal". Akihiro then dispatches the messenger to again make sure no trace of his presence is left. Later he appears on a train to Brussels, watching his father in a nearby stolen car. He then receives a phone call from an unknown "friend" (who is actually the resurrected Cyber), confirming his father's destination.

Shadowing his father into a bank vault in Brussels that contains the carbonadium synthesizer, Akihiro engages Wolverine in a bloody battle with Akihiro demonstrating great fighting prowess and similar speed and agility to his father. As Wolverine is hampered by his reluctance to kill his son and his fading belief that Akihiro can be redeemed, he quickly loses the upper hand despite his greater experience and training. Their fight is interrupted when Cyber breaks into the Vault and challenges Akihiro. It is then revealed that Akihiro trained under Cyber in the past. Cyber mentions that Akihiro is a better and faster fighter than he is, and was his finest student. However, Cyber's imperviousness and greater strength make that a moot point, as he later explains to Wolverine. Akihiro refuses to lead Cyber to his master and flees the fight, leaving his father and his mentor to deal with each other.

Akihiro is then seen in the presence of Wild Child, and a scarred, expressionless torturer who whips him with a gasoline soaked length of rope. He pleads for mercy, but receives only a warning from his "master" to stay away from his father.

Akihiro returns and fights Deadpool and Wolverine, managing to knock Deadpool unconscious after a long fight. Akihiro had spent the last couple of months being tortured under observation by Wild Child, who is acting on orders from their mutual master Romulus. Akihiro is then confronted by Wolverine, only to be shot in the back of the head by the Winter Soldier. Wolverine explains that he set up the entire scenario and leaves with the unconscious Akihiro, later revealed to have amnesia due to the bullet.

During the 2008 storyline "Manifest Destiny", Akihiro is tracked down by Sebastian Shaw and Mister Sinister to help Akihiro regain his memories. In the finale of Original Sin, Akihiro finally learns the truth behind Itsu's death and has joined Wolverine in seeking revenge against Romulus. However, Akihiro seemingly betrays Wolverine to Cyber afterward. It was later revealed it was all a plan to get to Cyber's secrets. After learning them, Akihiro apparently kills Cyber, leaving his body to Wolverine. During a conversation between Wolverine and Nick Fury, Fury reveals that he believes Akihiro is going after the Muramasa Blade that Wolverine left in Cyclops's care. The sword has various mystical properties, including the ability to disable superhuman regenerative powers. Fury believes that Akihiro intends to take the sword and have the metal bonded to his bone claws after stating that the Tinkerer would know how to do such a thing and had last been spotted in New York City.

=== Dark Reign: Member of the Dark Avengers (2009-2010) ===
During the 2008–2009 "Dark Reign" storyline, Norman Osborn puts together the Dark Avengers, recruiting Akihiro as a version of Wolverine, letting him wear a version of his father's brown and tan costume. Cyclops sees him as a liability and plans to kill him with the Muramasa Blade to protect the image of the X-Men. It is revealed, however, that he agreed to join the Dark Avengers as a way to draw out Cyclops to take the Muramasa Blade from his possession. When the X-Men attack him, he takes a piece of the blade and brings it to the Tinkerer who then bonds the metal to the claws on his wrists. After that, he is seen alongside the other Dark Avengers fighting Morganna le Fay's demons.

When Spider-Man enters Avengers Tower pretending to be Mac Gargan, he is first ambushed by Akihiro who knew he was not Mac via scent. However, Akihiro is eventually incapacitated by Spider-Man after being pummeled and thrown into an electric generator.

In Dark Reign: Sinister Spider-Man, Akihiro and Bullseye are sent by Osborn to kill Gargan. However, Akihiro is beaten badly by Gargan who throws him through a building.

In Dark Reign: The List – Punisher after repeated failed attempts to kill Frank Castle, Osborn sends Akihiro and a platoon of H.A.M.M.E.R. troops to complete this mission. After a bloody round of hand-to-hand combat, Akihiro decapitates and butchers Castle into pieces, before kicking his remains off a rooftop. Castle's body parts are collected and spirited away by Moloids seemingly operating under the protection of Man-Thing, where Castle's body is put back together and revived as Franken-Castle.

In The Incredible Hulk vol. 2 #603, Bruce Banner lures his son Skaar into a fight between him and Akihiro. Akihiro uses his pheromones to calm Skaar down, reducing him to his human form. Skaar then asks Akihiro to kill him, as he was guilty of the destruction he has caused, but Wolverine and Banner intervene. The two father-son teams battle, but the fight is stopped when Banner says that Skaar has learned his lesson and Akihiro abruptly leaves Wolverine behind.

Akihiro becomes a member of Osborn's Dark X-Men while remaining on the Dark Avengers team, though he takes the Dark X-Men's side in their quarrel with the Dark Avengers. When Bullseye asks him which side he was on, he replies that he "always did like playing for both teams".

However, Akihiro's loyalty to Osborn and true motives remain questionable, as Akihiro constantly mentions that "Osborn thinks I'm working for him". This puts him at odds with Bullseye and Ares. He secretly assists the Fantastic Four in helping them break into Avengers Tower to steal incriminating evidence against Osborn while trying to clear their name against Osborn, but was foiled by Bullseye. Ms. Marvel tries to psychoanalyze him and assuage her feelings for him, but Akihiro rebukes her and Osborn.

When Osborn brings his Avengers to bear against the dispossessed Olympians and their "Olympus Group" shell corporation, Akihiro encounters the god Pluto and receives from him a prophecy of Akihiro's own impending death: ". . .sooner than you think. And it will be bloody".

During Osborn's Siege of Asgard, it is revealed that Akihiro intends to turn on Osborn. He appears to murder his boss, but this was later revealed to be a hallucination caused by the Asgardian divinities who represent fate. Akihiro attempts to fight Thor, who strikes him down with a massive bolt of lightning before the two can even face off. Once the Siege ends with the Void's death, the Dark Avengers are rounded up and arrested. Akihiro is the only one to escape, doing so by killing and disguising himself as an army soldier.

=== Solo adventures and death (2010-2012) ===
Akihiro turns on Romulus because he figures out that Romulus really wanted Wolverine to take over his operation and not Akihiro. Akihiro stabs Romulus with his wrist-claws, but before he can deliver the killing blow, Wolverine has Cloak teleport Romulus to the Dark Force dimension. Logan thinks about simply cutting his head as he did with Sabretooth, but instead decides to leave him stranded forever.

He then goes back to Akihiro. They start to fight, but Logan stays calm. He parries Akihiro's angry attacks, then stabs him through with his claws. While Akihiro is unconscious, Logan rips out his Muramasa wrist claws. He then buries the claws with the remains of the Muramasa Blade in a grave near the Howlett estate, and Akihiro is shown with scars running up the insides of his forearms.

Akihiro, later seen at a nightclub, is attacked by Franken-Castle who is seeking revenge. After a brutal fight, Akihiro is defeated but decides to hunt Franken-Castle to continue the fight and retrieve the Bloodstone integrated into Fraken-Castle's new physical form. After following Franken-Castle's trail, Akihiro encounters a series of devastating traps before meeting his foe again. After a second brutal hand-to-hand battle, Akihiro is severely injured and retreats. Franken-Castle finds him and, after damaging Akihiro even more, is about to throw him into a mass of concrete foundation (presumably to kill him). However, Franken-Castle is stabbed in the chest from behind by Wolverine who states he is intervening in his plans to kill his son.

Escaping as the two fight, Akihiro gains the upper hand by incapacitating the Punisher (ramming him with a truck) and takes the Bloodstone, giving him increased strength and speed. It unfortunately accelerated his healing factor, which would create tumors after healing him. He is ultimately defeated when the Punisher shoves a phosphorus grenade into his chest, turning him into a tumor ridden monstrosity, simultaneously informing Akihiro that his attempts to taunt him failed because Punisher built his own reputation from the ground up while Akihiro is riding his father's reputation rather than trying to create his own. Wolverine removes the stone and returns it to Frank, but before Frank can give the coup de grace, Akihiro cuts himself out of the tumor mass and disappears.

Akihiro has a brief alliance with X-23, the female clone of his father. They confront the murderous Malcolm Colcord, the former director of Weapon X.

In the aftermath of the storyline "Collision" Akihiro is "cleaning up house" in Madripoor by either getting the rest of the criminal underworld to agree to serve him, or eradicating his enemies. A man named Tan Kim Seng falls into the latter category. Akihiro kills all of Tan's finest killers, leaving only a British entrepreneur named Hunt and Tan left cornered in his office. Tan is having a final drink as Akihiro breaks into the room. Tan states that he only trades with business men, not "Awun", which is Taiwanese for God of Destruction. Tan states that he knows that Akihiro is Patch's (aka Wolverine) son, and when he looks in Akihiro's eyes he tells him that his soul is gone. He berates Akihiro further by comparing him to his father Wolverine. This ultimately leads to his demise by a gunshot to his forehead. Tan's final words weigh heavy in Akihiro's mind later throughout the night. Akihiro decides to pay a visit to the Avengers Tower. He sets up a scenario that makes it look like the Tower is under attack. Wolverine picks up on Akihiro's scent and is ambushed by Akihiro. Akihiro states that he knew what Wolverine was planning by having the team split up so no harm would come to them. Akihiro lets Wolverine know that he did not come to kill him, but to say that he was going be missing for a while, and is going to live outside of Wolverine's shadow. Wolverine questions what he meant, but when Wolverine turns around, Akihiro is gone. Akihiro having a vast amount of money from his exploits in Madripoor, decides to start a new empire in the city of Los Angeles. He enters an expensive house that belonged to a previous couple that is lying dead on the steps at the entrance of the home. Akihiro looks at a marvelous view of Los Angeles and narrates to himself that he is not going to destroy, but create.

The story starts off with Akihiro wearing a Captain America mask, and is trying to pull off an "Italian Job" on the Los Angeles interstate 110 but is caught in a battle with the military. Akihiro makes it to the armored car, but begins to suffer withdrawal symptoms from a drug called "Heat". Akihiro promises to himself that he would not take the drug before the heist, but decides to take it anyway. Immediately after the drug is taken, he begins to hallucinate very heavily during the heist.

Seven days earlier, Akihiro is at a party in Hollywood with actors, directors, musicians, agents, executives, and beautiful women. Despite the lavish ambiance, Akihiro is extremely bored with the Hollywood facade. Akihiro's true motive for being at the party is to find a lead to who secretly controls Hollywood so he can take over. He was under the impression that Los Angeles was wide open due to "The Pride" losing control of the city. Akihiro was told by his fixer that the owner of the house and host of the party Marcus Roston, who also happens to be on Hollywood's A-List, has information as to who is pulling the strings in Hollywood. As Akihiro attempts to enter Roston's section, he is blocked by two bodyguards. Akihiro attempts to talk with one of them saying that he has a big deal. He is immediately disparaged by one of the guards. This causes Akihiro to attack him and break his nose. Immediately Akihiro is feeling the effects of the drug "Heat" and is disoriented even though his healing factor should have stopped it. He is knocked unconscious by the other bodyguard.

In an undisclosed part of Los Angeles, there is an up-and-coming actor who is being chased by some kind of serial killer. The actor is murdered during the night. The next day, the LAPD is investigating the crime scene. Two detectives are making jokes when one of them warns the other of "Narnia" approaching the scene. This happens to be F.B.I. agent Donna Kiel. Donna lets the detectives know as she is investigating the crime scene that she understands the not-so-subliminal joke, because she is ice cold like the witch in the children's story.

Akihiro regains consciousness in front of the two bodyguards and Marcus Roston himself. Akihiro is surprised about the pills. Marcus confirms that he knows about them. He also berates Akihiro, stating that he is not a big deal due to the fact that he does not know him. As he threatens him, Akihiro dispatches his guards. Marcus attempts to bargain with Akihiro. Akihiro tells him that he not only wants money, but he also wants power and validation. Marcus pleads with him, saying that he will do anything for his life to be spared. Akihiro grabs Marcus by his head, engages in a kiss and seduces the celebrity. Akihiro only did this to suit his needs, get connections to who is controlling the Los Angeles underworld and to gain access to more of "The Heat".

F.B.I. agent Donna Kiel confirms the identity of the victim of the serial killer, making a snide remark about one less actor in Hollywood. The victim was killed by wounds caused by claws. She walks back to her office and it shows numerous pictures of Akihiro on her wall, indicating that Akihiro is considered a prime suspect for the serial killings.

Six days earlier, Akihiro and Marcus are watching a final cut from an upcoming movie that Marcus is starring in. Akihiro tells him that he feels the movie is simplistic. Marcus explains to Akihiro that the audience loves things that are simple. He does wish to do an indie film which is more personal, but he has to strike while his fame is on the rise as a leading man in movies. Akihiro insults Marcus by suggesting that he should be a queen. Marcus replies that if he comes "out of the closet" his acting career will suffer, and he says that if Akihiro cannot understand that, he does not understand the movie business. Akihiro shows his claws and threatens Marcus to tell him his dealer of the "heat pills". Marcus asks Akihiro why he loves the pills so much.

Akihiro goes into a narration to the reader about the pills. As Akihiro is narrating, there are scenes of him in a state of euphoria as he meets up with Marcus's dealer, and shoots him twice in the thighs. The dealer gives up his supplier as Akihiro cuts him with his claws. Akihiro also states the supplier psychically told him the location of where the Los Angeles crime bosses are holding a secret meeting. Akihiro then goes to the nightclub where the dealer's supplier is enjoying a night out, and the situation worsens, but Akihiro does not care, because he loves the euphoria of the "heat pills".

During an investigation, Akihiro has a confrontation with the hero Moon Knight before he can discover the identity of the mysterious kingpin of Los Angeles.

A beaten up and broken Akihiro discovers the properties of the heat pills are from non-human blood, confirming his suspicions that the blood belongs to a member of the Pride. An angry Akihiro wonders how to kill a member of the Pride but realizes he does not know, so he seeks out the people who do - their children, the Runaways. The Runaways, however, do not take lightly to his appearance and immediately attack him. Akihiro manages to talk them down, and reveals that he believes Roston to be an exiled member of The Pride. Chase confirms that he recognizes Roston as "Uncle Eli", a distant relative he had not seen in some time. Akihiro asks the Runaways to prepare to fight while he tracks down Roston.

Akihiro meets Donna Kiel at a restaurant. Akihiro, attempting to make a joke, is stopped by a distressed and perturbed Donna. Donna forces Akihiro to admit why they are meeting, but Akihiro does not. An impatient Donna states to him that they were meeting up to find out if they are going to fall in love. Donna then calls him a coward, and a scared little boy due to him not saying this. Those comments anger Akihiro to the point of grabbing Donna and popping out his claws. Donna states that she was not part of the super hero, mutant, and clone club, and offered Akihiro a chance to admit who he truly is. She tells him that she is smart and Akihiro cannot hide himself from her. She says she does not want to be a cliché and wants to be real. Akihiro and Donna the share a long passionate kiss, before Donna stops the embrace. Akihiro questions why, and she tells him that he is a murderer, cop killer, and a monster. Akihiro laughs hysterically and then is smacked. Akihiro admits that this is who he is and has no compunctions regarding murder and sleeps well at night. Donna screams at him saying that he was not capable of feeling love, and just because they were both tortured by Roston and shared an addiction does not mean they should be together. She questions how she could ever fall in love with a man like that. Akihiro replies that she is the same as him. She denies this, saying that she has never killed anyone. Akihiro insists that Donna comes with him, so he can help her. He takes her to an underground basement. To Donna's surprise, she sees three men that are tied up and look like they have been tortured. Donna states that she is F.B.I. and that he is out of his mind. Akihiro says that she rationalizes her psychotic tendencies by catching other psychopaths. He gives her a gun and attempts to convince her to pull the trigger so she can release her repressed emotions and be free. Donna admits to Akihiro that this is true. Akihiro does achieve this goal, but not to the desired effect, as she points the gun towards Akihiro. She knows his healing factor is gone, and he can be killed. Before she can arrest him, Akihiro cuts off her hand in defense. Akihiro, in disbelief, asks her why she would do that. She replies that the world is better off without him. Akihiro covers her wound saying that she does not mean that, because she came back to save him and no one has ever done that for him. She says that she did not come back for him, but she was trying to stop a monster. Akihiro, in disbelief, turns and walks away after being rejected. As he enters the elevator, he makes a final attempt to gain her love by saying that he will change. She simply responds with "No you won't". Donna later walks to towards a police car asking for medical assistance. Akihiro had come to Los Angeles to build his empire, but after being rejected, lost his sense of self, purpose, and drive.

Akihiro seeks out Mister Fantastic who informs him that the Heat pills have destroyed his healing factor which will result in his death. He advises they could study Wolverine's healing factor to help but Akihiro refuses. Akihiro finds his father and doses him with Heat and sets off a chain of events that will bring his story to a brutal end. Akihiro went to Los Angeles to build something for himself. There, he tried to take over the city's criminal underworld becoming L.A.'s Kingpin. During his mission he meets and falls in love with FBI agent Donna Kiel, who shared some of the traits that made Akihiro unique, but he was rejected by her, and cut her arms.

After months of trying, he fails at becoming the head of the underworld in Los Angeles, and he is defeated using the powerful drug Heat, which gave him hallucinations and burned down his healing factor. Dying, he returned to New York to "go out with a bang", drugging his father and taking him to watch his "show". He bombed the headquarters of the Avengers and the Fantastic Four, installed bombs around the city and drugged and easily subdued Mister Fantastic. After a long battle with the heroes of the city and without a healing factor, he started to die. Akihiro asked for his father, hugged him and asked him to forgive him. But before Logan could say anything, Akihiro said he was actually sorry for putting a bomb at the Jean Grey School for Higher Learning and immolated himself with a bomb, leaving no body to bury. Wolverine rushed to his school to find nothing but a little doll of him, realizing that Akihiro's plan was just to leave him with nothing.

Though it has yet to be disclosed how Akihiro turns up alive, he is revealed to be the secret mastermind behind the latest incarnation of the Brotherhood of Mutants (consisting of Sabretooth, Mystique, Shadow King, Skinless Man, Blob of Earth-295, and the Omega Clan) in a plot to attack the members of X-Force. Wolverine and Akihiro face off in an emotionally charged battle. During the fight, there are flashes of how Akihiro wished his life had played out with Wolverine like living happily together with Akihiro's mother Itsu. Akihiro finally meets his end when his father drowns him. Wolverine tells Akihiro that he blames himself and wishes he could have protected Akihiro more. The issue ends with Wolverine imagining the happy life they could have had.

=== Marvel NOW!: Uncanny Avengers, Death of Wolverine: The Logan Legacy and Wolverines (2013-2015) ===
The Apocalypse Twins resurrect Akihiro through the use of a Celestial Death Seed, and make him part of their new Horsemen of Death. He sends a worm creature to capture Wolverine, and confronts his father when the creature returns with him. After the Twins are defeated, Akihiro escapes with the Grim Reaper. He expresses shock at having returned to the realm of the living and states that despite having failed to kill Logan yet again, at least the sun will rise the following day.

Some time after the events of his father's death, Akihiro resurfaces at an auction house in Madripoor, where two of his father's claws are being sold to the highest bidder. Akihiro proceeds to tell all present that he will not allow anyone to dishonor his father and whoever does so will be eliminated. After retrieving his father's claws, Akihiro proceeds to kill all of the bidders present with the exception of Madame Hydra, Mystique and one undercover Hydra scout, who was a former lover of Akihiro's.

=== Marvel Legacy: All-New Wolverine, Iceman and X-Men Blue (2017–2018) ===
Akihiro is persuaded to show up by S.H.I.E.L.D. to an isolated section of New York City. There, along with many other people with healing abilities, Akihiro draws a virus off of New Yorkers, willingly saving their lives. Akihiro shows compassion for Gabby, a clone of X-23, when Gabby is unable to save two citizens.

During the "Hunt for Wolverine" storyline, Akihiro is told that Wolverine may have survived. When they hear that Wolverine is sighted in Maybelle, Arizona, Sabretooth tells Akihiro that he will kill Wolverine again and then kill Akihiro. When the three of them arrive in Maybelle, Akihiro finds members of Soteira Killteam Nine there. Just then, Akihiro is attacked by Maybelle's citizens, who have been resurrected as zombies. Akihiro is captured by the Killteam, but manages to escape. When Akihiro catches up to them, Lady Deathstrike and Sabretooth are informed of a glowing green device in the power station that may be responsible for the zombie outbreak and that they must destroy the device before Maybelle is destroyed. In the ensuing battle, Akihiro is stabbed by Lord Dark Wind and dies. Soteira proceeds to acquire Akihiro's body and revive him to their cause.

=== Krakoan Age: X-Factor, Marauders, Alpha Flight, and Sabretooth War (2019–2024) ===
A fully resurrected Daken returns in the House of X series during the Dawn of X relaunch. Akihiro, along with several other villainous mutants led by Apocalypse, is welcomed to Krakoa by Charles Xavier, Magneto and Moira X and accepts Xavier's offer to join the new nation in order to heal mutantdom and start over a whole species together. During his time in Krakoa, Akihiro reconciles with Wolverine and is shown spending time with his father and "sister" Gabby in the Krakoan bar.

Akihiro offers his services when Northstar arrives on Krakoa for help in locating his missing sister Aurora. Despite a rocky start, Akihiro proves to be a valuable ally, and Northstar's team successfully recovers Aurora's body for resurrection by the Five on Krakoa. The Quiet Council of Krakoa approves the team's formation as X-Factor Investigations with Northstar chosen as leader and tasks them with assisting the Five in investigating missing mutants and locating the deceased for resurrection. Akihiro later takes up residence in X-Factor's new base of operations, naming it the Boneyeard. Akihiro begins romantically pursuing Aurora, who is reluctant to reciprocate his feelings despite her own growing attraction to him. In a later mission, Akihiro is tasked by Northstar in monitoring Siryn following her repeated suicides and uncooperative behavior after her resurrection on Krakoa. In reality, Siryn had been possessed by the Morrigan, who lures Akihiro into an abandoned Canadian village. Having earlier cut off his communication from the rest of X-Factor, the Morrigan brutally attacks Akihiro, taunting him for being abandoned by his teammates before impaling him on a wooden spike and leaving him for dead. Barely kept alive for days by his healing factor, Akihiro nearly succumbs to his wounds before being rescued by Northstar, who had just discovered the Morrigan's sabotage. Akihiro is visited by Aurora while he is recuperating and the two share their first kiss, consummating their relationship. When the Morrigan takes over the Boneyard and kills several members of X-Factor, Akihiro is killed during his second confrontation with the goddess and is promptly resurrected along with his teammates the following day. X-Factor launches a successful counterattack on the Morrigan, freeing Siryn from her control and de-haunting the Boneyard.

Akihiro and Aurora attend the Hellfire Gala as a couple, which leads to an altercation with Aurora's ex-boyfriend Wild Child. Akihiro reveals to Aurora that he knew about her split-personality and the circumstances surrounding her initial death and helps his teammates confront Prodigy's murderer and recovers his previously dead body. When Scarlet Witch's body is discovered near the end of the Gala, Akihiro and X-Factor investigate her death and along with the X-Men and X-Force conclude that Magneto is the prime suspect.

Akihiro comes across the obituary of his former lover from 1967, Carl Valentino, a mutant with the ability to manipulate dreams. Realizing that Carl spent his whole life without publicly revealing his sexuality and mutation, Akihiro has him resurrected on Krakoa as his younger self to enjoy a second chance at life. Carl rechristens himself as Somnus.

Akihiro is captured and tortured by Brimstone Love and is rescued by Aurora, Somnus and Kate Pryde's Marauders. Akihiro subsequently joins the team along with his former and current lovers and embarks with them to Shi'ar space on a mission to uncover a two billion year mystery of missing mutants. When the Marauders come into conflict with the Kin Crimson, Akihiro kills the Chronicle, a turncoat Lupak, in combat. During the Marauders' victory celebration with the Shi'ar, Akihiro is rewarded by the Imperial Guard with the attire, totems and title of Fang for his actions, something his father previously failed to earn.

During the "A.X.E.: Judgment Day" storyline, Akihiro faces judgement from the Celestial Progenitor, who lambasts him for "living out the names others put upon [him]." While recounting his judgement with Birdy, Akihiro accepts his new moniker Fang as it was the only name that he earned rather than have forced upon him.

Fang eventually tracks down Brimstone Love in Madripoor and defeats him with assistance from Lockheed and Johnny Dee.

Fang attends the Third Annual Hellfire Gala when it is attacked by the anti-mutant organization Orchis. Fang and several other mutant survivors escape and are forced underground when Orchis' propaganda renews anti-mutant sentiment throughout the world. Fang subsequently joins Alpha Flight to help protect mutant refugees from the Canadian government. Fang, along with Aurora and Northstar, travels to X-Force's new Arctic base, where he is reunited with Laura and Logan.

While outside of the base, Fang is ambushed and killed by Sabretooth and multiversal variants, who proceeds to spell out "Happy Birthday" with pieces of Fang's corpse to taunt Logan. After the Sabretooth Army is driven away from the Arctic Base but manage to slaughter many of its inhabitants and abduct Laura, Logan falls into despair and Aurora mourns Fang's death, which is rendered permanent as Krakoa's Resurrection Protocols are no longer an option. Akihiro's death is avenged when Wolverine kills Sabretooth at the end of the conflict.

=== From the Ashes: Hellverine and Spirits of Violence (2024-2026) ===
Shortly after Akihiro's death to Sabretooth, the demon Bagra-ghul, who previously fought and briefly possessed Logan, flies to Akihiro's gravesite at the North Pole, having been drawn to Akihiro's similar presence as his father's. Bagra-ghul stitches Akihiro's body back together, resurrects and possesses him, transforming him into Hellverine. Having been influenced by Wolverine's altruistic thoughts during the brief period of possessing him, Bagra-ghul compels Hellverine into targeting and slaughtering sinners and evildoers throughout North America to sate the demon's bloodlust. Hellverine's activities lead to an encounter with the Destroyers, occult-powered and undead Super Soldiers created by Project Hellfire but have just broken free of their programming. The rampaging Warriors and Hellverine's appearance prompt Project director General Harms to seek out Logan, believing him to be Hellverine, but after reviewing the battle footage Logan deduces Hellverine's identity to be Akihiro after noticing his distinctive tattoo. When initially resurrected by Bagra-ghul, Akihiro was left amnesic and semi-catatonic, only reacting to presence of sinners. Akihiro begins regaining his memories and sense of self just as he senses of the presence of the remaining Destroyers making their way to Washington, D.C.

After Hellverine kills one Destroyer and gives chase to the surviving one, Harms shoots Hellverine with a holy-water laced bullet, gravely wounding him. Hellverine collapses mid-chase just as Logan tracks him down and comes to his son's aid. Logan willingly allows Bagra-ghul to possess him again, believing it would save Akihiro's life. Unbeknownst to Logan, Bagra-ghul's influence was actually keeping Akihiro alive and Akihiro's body begins to deteriorate as Bagra-ghul leaves him to reclaim his former host. Sympathizing with Bagra-ghul's attempts to change, Logan returns Bagra-ghul to Akihiro's body, which revives him and completely restores his memories. Against Logan's advice, Akihiro vows to put an end to Project Hellfire and the two team up to track down Harms, who has empowered himself with demonic energy. With some unexpected help from the surviving Destroyer and his former commanding officer, lieutenant colonel Leon Townsend, Hellverine kills Harms. To prevent Project Hellfire from going rogue again, Hellverine decides to leave it under the supervision of the Destroyers and its sympathetic head researcher Dr. Spivey. Hellverine parts ways with Logan before promising to meet up with him in the future.

Despite his best efforts, Akihiro struggles with keeping Bagra-ghul contained and continues hunting down evildoers as Hellverine. Hellverine seeks out Doctor Strange, who discovers that Bagra-ghul is a small part of a larger scheme concocted by Mephisto. Strange sends Hellverine back to the North Pole at the site where Bagra-ghul resurrected him as part of the first step to uncovering Mephisto's plans. Hellverine discovers that a portal to Hell had been created at the spot where he was resurrected and empowered by another monument of corpses, which Hellverine destroys. Strange arrives and informs Akihiro that the magic being summoned from Hell is targeting mutants. Revealing that every source of Hell magic on Earth is a site of Akihiro's past tragedy and that Mephisto is using Akihiro's suffering as conduit for his power, Strange tasks him with foiling Mephisto's plot by destroying Mephisto's monuments around the world. Following the origin of his own suffering, Akihiro returns to Jasmine Falls in Japan, where he discovers that his mother Istu has been resurrected as a demon by Mephisto and was kidnapping the village children. Hellverine kills Itsu to save the children and to put an end to her suffering and is gifted with an omamori by the village leader. Akihiro then travels to Genosha, where Wolverine had previously drowned him, and encounters Mephisto. Mephisto drags Akihiro to Hell and reveals his plan to corrupt mutankind into serving as his personal army on Earth and offers Akihiro the choice of either serving him as his loyal servant or to suffer eternal torture for his past sins. Akihiro casts a spell he learned from Strange that binds Bagra-ghul to his will, allowing him to completely resist Mephisto's influence and attacks him. Mephisto casts Akihiro from Hell and he finds himself back in Genosha, where Dr. Spivey is waiting for him. Spivey informs Hellverine that Project Hellfire needs his help again with another problem.

Akihiro is taken back to the Pentangle, Project Hellfire's headquarters and meets their new half demon chief analyst, Severith. Severith explains that sometime been Bagra-ghul's release and Akihiro's resurrection, the disembodied body parts of a demon called the Hell Hulk emerged throughout Earth and have been causing those within range of each piece to fall into uncontrollable rages and murder. Due to his ability to sense the Hell Hulk while resisting his influence, Hellverine works with the Destroyers into recovering the pieces of the Hell Hulk. After the Hell Hulk's body is reassembled-while his head is kept separated to prevent him from awakening-Akihiro attempts to read his memories but is left severely weakened after being exposed to the Hell Hulk's radiation for too long. While he recovers, Akihiro is ambushed by Severith, who reveals himself as the Hell Hulk's creator, and traps Akihiro within a magic prison to prevent him from interfering with the Hell Hulk's awakening. Akihiro manages to free himself but is too late to stop Severith and the Hell Hulk from destroying the Pentangle and leaving a wake of destruction across Washington, D.C..

Due to the public fallout, the Pentagon threatens to shut down Project Hellfire and orders Hellverine to remain at the Pentangle. While investigating Severith's private quarters, Akihiro realizes that Severith plans to lure Mephisto to Earth—where he will be weaker—to kill him and usurp him as the new king of Hell. Akihiro is visited by Aurora and while discussing their relationship and recent events, Akihiro deduces that Severith is traveling to Hell's Backbone in Utah—Project Hellfire's original site. Aurora leaves but when she fails to return, a worried Hellverine defies his orders and travels to Utah alone. Upon arriving, Hellverine discovers a pocket dimension between Hell and Earth and encounters Mephisto. Mephisto reveals that he captured Aurora and uses her as leverage to force Hellverine into working with him to stop Severith together. Hellverine and Mephisto confront Severith and the Hell Hulk, who have opened a gateway to hell and summoned a horde of demons. Although Hellverine manages to kill the demons, Severith uses his magic to restrain him while Mephisto is nearly overwhelmed by the Hell Hulk. Akihiro is nearly killed when Severith extracts Bagra-ghul from him, but is saved by the Destroyers and Aurora—whose capture was revealed to be a ruse. Mephisto drags the Hell Hulk to Hell with him while Hellverine re-absorbs Bagra-ghul and incinerates Severith to death with his hellfire. With the crisis averted, Akihiro celebrates this victory with his friends and accepts his identity as Hellverine.

While hunting down a drug cartel in Culiacán Rosales, Hellverine is approached by Vengeance, who warns him of the Spirit of Violence, but he rebuffs Vengeance's proposal for an alliance against the new threat. Nonetheless, Hellverine and Vengeance join forces with the other Ghost Riders in New York when the Spirit of Violence's creator Corruption sends the Spirit of Corruption and demonic robots after them. Hellverine and the others succeed in banishing Corruption in another dimension and destroying most of her forces, including the Spirit of Violence.

=== Shadows of Tomorrow: Inglorious X-Force and Fugitive X-Force (2026-2027) ===
Hellverine is recruited by Cable into a new incarnation of X-Force to prevent the future assassination of Kamala Khan, who is destined to become the first mutant President of the United States. Unbeknownst to the team, Cable suspects Hellverine, Archangel, or Boom-Boom of being the assassin. During their missions, Hellverine uses his supernatural abilities to help rescue an angel who subsequently confirms his innocence. He also begins a romantic relationship with Boom-Boom and develops a rivalry with Archangel, although the two gradually gain mutual respect. After the team confronts Mister Sinister, Cable reveals his suspicions but exonerates all three recruits, redirecting his investigation toward the revived Mutant Liberation Front.

When Domino assembles a rival X-Force team to confront Cable after he believes her to be the future assassin, Hellverine reflects on his possession by Bagra-Ghul, whose influence he has come to regard as an opportunity to atone for his past rather than return to his former life. Domino and her team then reveal that Cable is possessed by Catharsix, a sentient bioweapon responsible for the future assassination attempt. Hellverine and his teammates subsequently pursue Cable into the future and prevent Kamala's murder and free him from Catharsix. Following Cable's departure and their return to the present, X-Force is framed by Catharsix for an attack on a mutant refugee camp and forced into hiding.

== Powers and abilities ==
Akihiro has inherited a potential of mutant abilities from his father, although he possesses certain powers Wolverine does not have.

Akihiro's primary mutant power is a rapid healing factor that allows him to recover damaged or destroyed parts of his body faster and more extensively than a normal human. As an example of his effective healing factor, Akihiro once instantly healed from a serious beating from the Thing, recovered from a massive explosive inflicted by the Punisher, and regenerated a lost arm he suffered from Mister Sinister. His healing factor also is powerful enough to significantly enhance his natural physical abilities, augment his immunity to poisons or diseases, and increase his longevity.

However, Akihiro's healing factor is different from his father. While Wolverine heals in an automated nature, Akihiro heals in cognitive fashion, through sentient thought and emotional control. It was revealed in All-New Wolverine 28#, Muramasa claimed that Akihiro's guilt of not preventing his father's death is what slowed down his healing factor. Inner meditation was required for Akihiro to become whole, such as regenerating a missing arm.

Like his father, Akihiro possesses three retractable claws, contained within his forearms; two on the top of knuckles and one underneath his wrist. These claws are much tougher and thicker than normal human bone, sharp and strong enough to easily cuts through durable metals that is equivalent to the likes of Iron Man's armor. At one point, Akihiro had the claws underneath his wrists coated with a piece of the Muramasa blade. To protect himself from the blade's anti-healing properties, Akihiro had adamantium housings implanted in his wrists to act as sheathes for his Muramasa claws. After these claws were ripped out by Wolverine, Akihiro's normal claws grew back in their place. Through the use of the Death Seed, Akihiro's claws radiate a blue-colored energy, greatly increasing their lethality. These energized claws possess the same anti-healing abilities of his old Muramasa claws. Upon further channelling the Death Seed, Akihiro can produce multiple jet black razor sharp protrusions from his forearms in addition to his six claws.

Akihiro has animal-like senses of sight, hearing, and smell at superhuman level. These senses make him a dangerous tracker or hunter, allowing Akihiro to detect people or objects by scent alone, track a target despite its scent being diminished by time or weather, or detect anyone lying.

Akihiro has the ability to manipulate the pheromones of others. With complete control over the pheromones (like the Purple Man), Akihiro can use his powers to manipulate a target's emotions and senses, allowing him to alter them, hinder their depth awareness and visual insight, causing them to act sluggishly or slowly. His powers also granted him empathic ability, allowing him to sense and understand the emotions, feelings, or intentions of people and animals around him. However, Akihiro's powers are limited to only influencing or adjusting a target's pre-existing emotions and senses, he cannot manufacture or create new emotions within them like how a telepath can.

Akihiro has a powerful mental defense to telepathy, for his mind is a trap for telepaths that attempt to enter his head. The trap turns a skilled telepath's powers against them.

After being resurrected by the Apocalypse Twins, who use the Death Seed to turn him into a Horsemen of Death, Akihiro had been granted with the power and potential to become the new repetition of Apocalypse on Earth. In Iceman #9, a new mutant named Zachary unintentionally helps Akihiro access the Death Seed's powers, which significantly amplified Akihiro's abilities, including amplifying his super senses and increasing his biomass, granting him superhuman strength and durability.

Akihiro is a superb martial artist and hand-to-hand combatant, acknowledged by his former instructor, Cyber. His combat prowess was demonstrated when he bested Wolverine, Deadpool, Skaar, Punisher, and Sabretooth in combat. Combined with his ability to manipulate pheromones, this grants Akihiro an incredible advantage over his opponents in combat. Akihiro is also a trained Samurai, acquiring great skill in both Japanese swordsmanship arts and Kyūdō.

Akihiro is a master strategist and tactician, as seen when he was able to infiltrate a heavily-guarded S.H.I.E.L.D. base to free his father without getting caught. He's also a master manipulator and deceiver, capable of fooling two of the most intelligent men, Norman Osborn and Reed Richards, at the same time.

When he was resurrected and possessed by the demon Bagra-ghul as Hellverine, Akihiro gained additional powers similar to those of a Ghost Rider. This includes superhuman strength, durability, stamina, speed, agility and reflexes; an improved healing factor; the ability to project mystical Hellfire, typically by imbuing it into his claws; use of a Hellfire-powered motorcycle; summoning a mystical chain; and sensing paranormal activity and the sins committed by evildoers. When he initially transformed into Hellverine, Akihiro's appearance took on that of his father's likeness as Hellverine, including Wolverine's brown and yellow uniform, his short and stocky physique, adamantium claws and a flaming skull whose projected flames resembled Wolverine's cowl and hairstyle. After regaining his memories and control over Bagra-ghul, Ahikiro's Hellverine transformation first consisted of his regular appearance and a flaming skull, with the skull's flames now resembling his mohawk hairstyle and flames projecting from his body tattoos. Eventually his controlled Hellverine transformation would include his Fang attire and the flames on his skull would revert to resembling Wolverine's flames.

However, Hellverine is highly susceptible to holy-water, which nullifies his healing factor and reverts his transformation. Since his resurrection, Akihiro is dependent on Bagra-ghul's possession for his survival, as he can die if the demon ever leaves his body. Entering a holy site or a place of worship can also cause Hellverine to experience pain and nausea although this can be negated when Hellverine possesses certain amulets.

After Doctor Strange provides him with the Book of Lamentation, Akihiro learns how to cast Hell magic by drawing out demonic ciphers and symbols found within the Book, typically by carving them out with his claws. Some of these spells have included fear inducement and mind control.

== Reception ==
- In 2018, CBR.com ranked Akihiro 10th (as worse than Wolverine) in their "8 X-Men Kids Cooler Than Their Parents (And 7 Who Are Way Worse)" list.

== Other versions ==
=== Earth-138 ===
In the Spider-Punk universe, Daken-Sama is a member of a Japanese biker gang called the Marauders.

=== Ultimate Universe ===
An alternate universe version of Akihiro appears in Ultimate X-Men. This version claims to be the first mutant and donated his blood to the Children of the Atom.

=== What If? ===
In What If? Wolverine: Father #1, Logan was present when his son was born and was able to save him from the people who would have raised him in the original course of events, taking him to live in seclusion in the mountains in the hope that he could raise John Howlett away from the kind of life he has lived himself. However, despite his attempts to ensure privacy by turning Professor X away when he came to recruit Logan to join the X-Men, Logan's attempts to suppress John's darker instincts failed when Sabretooth found them, revealing the truth about his father's past to John. Leaving his father, John became a brutal killer, roaming various cities and killing his opponents, proclaiming that Logan made him what he is by denying him his heritage. Concluding that he will never bring anything good into the world, Logan stabs John in the heart with the Muramasa Blade, subsequently impaling himself to end his own dark stain on the world.

== Collected editions ==
Title	Material collected	Published date	ISBN
Dark Wolverine Vol. 1: The Prince	Dark Wolverine #75-77 and material from Wolverine (vol. 3) #73-74	November 2009	978-0785139003
Dark Wolverine Vol. 2: My Hero	Dark Wolverine #78-81	March 2010	978-0785139775
Siege: X-Men	Dark Wolverine #82-84, New Mutants (vol. 3) #11, Siege: Storming Asgard - Heroes & Villains #1	August 2010	978-0785148159
Wolverine: The Reckoning	Dark Wolverine #85-87, Wolverine: Origins #46-50	October 2010	978-0785139782
Punisher: Franken-Castle	Dark Wolverine #88-89, Punisher (vol. 8) #11-16, Franken-Castle #17-21, Dark Reign: The List - Punisher #1	December 2010	978-0785147541
Daken: Dark Wolverine - Punishment	Dark Wolverine #75-89, Dark Reign: The List - Punisher #1, Wolverine: Origins #47-48, Franken-Castle #19-20, Dark Wolverine Saga #1	July 2017	978-1302906863
Daken: Dark Wolverine Vol. 1: Empire	Dark Wolverine #90, Daken: Dark Wolverine #1-4	February 2011	978-0785147053
Daken/X-23: Collision	Daken: Dark Wolverine #5-9, X-23 (vol. 3) #7-9	August 2011	978-0785147077
Daken: Dark Wolverine Vol. 2: Big Break	Daken: Dark Wolverine #9.1, 10-12	April 2012	978-0785156741
Daken: Dark Wolverine Vol. 3: The Pride Comes Before the Fall	Daken: Dark Wolverine #13-19	August 2012	978-0785152354
Daken: Dark Wolverine Vol. 4: No More Heroes	Daken: Dark Wolverine #20-23, What If? Wolverine: Father #1	December 2012	978-0785160885
Hellverine: Resurrection	Hellverine #1-4	January 2025	978-1302959982

== In other media ==
=== Video games ===
- Akihiro / Daken makes a cameo appearance in Marvel vs. Capcom 3: Fate of Two Worlds.
- Akihiro / Dark Wolverine appears as boss character in Marvel: Avengers Alliance. This version is a member of the Dark Avengers.
- Several versions of Akihiro appear as unlockable playable characters Marvel Puzzle Quest. In addition to his original Daken appearance, an older alternate version called Samurai Daken appears as well. This version of Akihiro is sent back in time to Feudal Japan by the Muramasa Blade after murdering his father with it. A remorseful Akihiro takes his father's moniker Wolverine for himself and roams the country as a heroic wandering samurai to repent for his sins and develops his own style of iaido the combines his swordsmanship with his claws.
- Akihiro / Daken and Hellverine appear as unlockable playable characters in Marvel Strike Force.
- Akihiro / Daken appears as an unlockable playable character in Marvel Future Fight.
- Akihiro / Daken appears in Marvel Duel.
