= Daniel Way =

American comic book writer

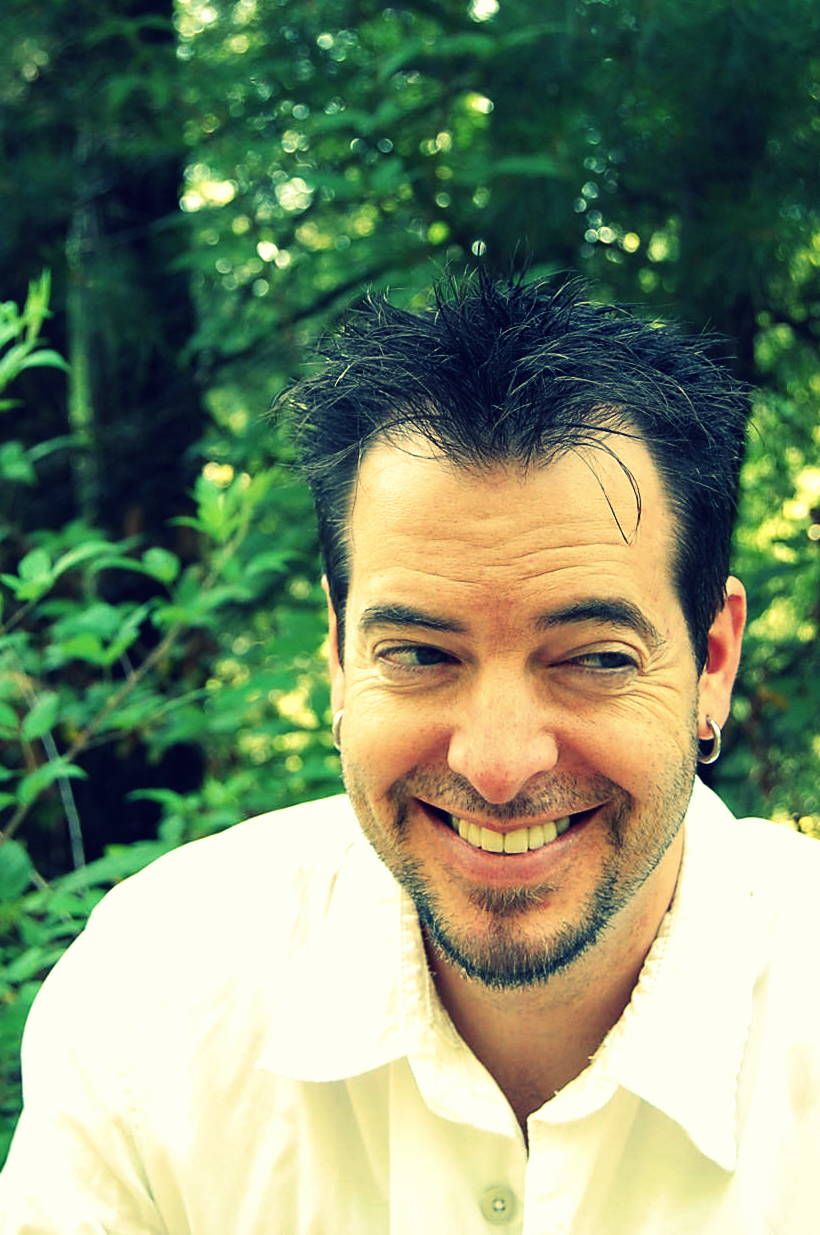
- Born: December 27, 1974 (age 51) West Branch, Michigan, U.S.
- Area: Writer
- Notable works: Venom; Wolverine: Origins; Deadpool; Hit-Girl In Hong Kong
- Awards: Xeric Grant

Daniel Way (born December 27, 1974) is an American comic book writer, known for his work on Marvel Comics series such as Wolverine: Origins and Deadpool, as well as the Deadpool video game.

== Career ==
Way received the Xeric Grant in 2000 for his debut publication, Violent Lifestyle. Through Violent Lifestyle, Way was introduced to Marvel Comics editor Axel Alonso, who hired Way for a Deathlok mini-series that was cancelled prior to publication.

Way's first published work for Marvel was a two-part storyline in Spider-Man's Tangled Web, followed by Gun Theory, a mini-series with artist Jon Proctor under the revived Epic Comics imprint that was cancelled after only two issues. Way continued to work for Marvel; his subsequent work for the publisher includes Wolverine, Agent X, Venom, Sabretooth: Open Season, Bullseye: Greatest Hits, Ghost Rider, The Incredible Hulk, Supreme Power: Nighthawk and Wolverine: Origins.

After Deadpool appeared in a Wolverine: Origins storyline, Way launched a new ongoing Deadpool series with artist Paco Medina. Artist Carlo Barberi joined the series after the Secret Invasion tie-in opening arc, followed by the Dark Reign tie-in storylines "How Low Can You Go?", which saw the return of Bob, Agent of Hydra, and "Magnum Opus", a four-issue crossover with Thunderbolts. In addition to writing the ongoing Deadpool series for four years, Way also contributed the script for the Deadpool video game, developed by High Moon Studios and published by Activision in 2013, and the same year wrote the new volume of the Thunderbolts series launched as part of the company-wide Marvel NOW! initiative.

== Bibliography ==
=== Early work ===
- Violent Lifestyle (with J. P. Dupras, self-published as Mad American Productions, 2000)
  - Despite being labeled as Volume One, Book One of Six, this issue was the only publication released in the series and by Mad American in general.
  - Way wanted to remake the story with "an improved script" and a new artist Jon Proctor, but Way and Proctor ended up working on another project instead:
    - Gun Theory, a graphic novel that was turned into a 4-issue limited series after being picked up for publication via the short-lived revival of Marvel's Epic imprint.
      - Gun Theory #1–2 (with the last two issues solicited but cancelled by Way and Proctor due to contractual disputes with Marvel, 2003)
      - Bye-Bye, Harvey: A Gun Theory Short Story (prequel one-shot, self-published as Bad Press, 2006)
        - This one-shot also featured a preview of Way's unreleased 5-issue limited series Heavier Than God (art by Ken Knudtsen)
      - In 2013, Way and Proctor launched a Kickstarter campaign to release an "updated" and complete version of Gun Theory in the form of a graphic novel.
      - While the campaign failed to get funded, the graphic novel was eventually published by Dark Horse as Gun Theory (160 pages, 2017, ISBN 1-61655-657-9)

=== Marvel Comics ===
- Spider-Man:
  - Spider-Man's Tangled Web #16–17: "Heartbreaker" (with Leandro Fernández, anthology, 2002)
    - Collected in Spider-Man's Tangled Web Volume 3 (tpb, 160 pages, 2002, ISBN 0-7851-0951-X)
    - Collected in Spider-Man's Tangled Web Omnibus (hc, 560 pages, 2017, ISBN 1-302-90682-8)
  - Venom #1–18 (with Francisco Herrera, Paco Medina (#6–10), Sean Galloway (#13) and Skottie Young (#14–18), Tsunami, 2003–2004)
    - Collected as Ultimate Collection: Venom by Daniel Way (tpb, 424 pages, 2011, ISBN 0-7851-5704-2)
    - Collected in Venomnibus Volume 3 (hc, 1,088 pages, 2020, ISBN 1-302-92632-2)
- X-Men:
  - Wolverine by Daniel Way: The Complete Collection Volume 1 (tpb, 504 pages, 2017, ISBN 1-302-90472-8) includes:
    - Wolverine:
      - "Down the Road" (with John McCrea, in vol. 2 #187, 2003)
      - "Good Cop/Bad Cop" (with Staz Johnson, in vol. 2 #188–189, 2003)
      - "Chasing Ghosts" (with Javier Saltares, in vol. 3 #33–35, 2005)
      - "Origins and Endings" (with Javier Saltares, in vol. 3 #36–40, 2006)
    - Sabretooth: Open Season #1–4 (with Bart Sears, 2004–2005)
    - I ♥ Marvel: My Mutant Heart: "The Promise" (with Ken Knudtsen, anthology one-shot, 2006)
  - Agent X #12: "Out with a Bang" (with Kyle Hotz, 2003)
    - Collected in Deadpool Classic Volume 10 (tpb, 272 pages, 2014, ISBN 0-7851-9046-5)
    - Collected in Deadpool Classic Omnibus (hc, 1,299 pages, 2016, ISBN 0-7851-9674-9)
  - Wolverine: Origins (with Steve Dillon, Stephen Segovia (#26–27), Mike Deodato, Jr. (#28–30), Yanick Paquette (#31–32), Doug Braithwaite, Scot Eaton (#37–40, 46) and Will Conrad (#47–50), 2006–2010) collected as:
    - Wolverine by Daniel Way: The Complete Collection Volume 1 (includes #1–5, tpb, 504 pages, 2017, ISBN 1-302-90472-8)
    - Wolverine by Daniel Way: The Complete Collection Volume 2 (collects #6–15 and Annual #1, tpb, 480 pages, 2017, ISBN 1-302-90738-7)
      - Includes the What If...? (featuring Wolverine) one-shot (written by Way, art by Jon Proctor, 2006)
    - Wolverine by Daniel Way: The Complete Collection Volume 3 (collects #16–32, tpb, 504 pages, 2018, ISBN 1-302-90472-8)
      - Includes the X-Men: Original Sin one-shot (co-written by Way and Mike Carey, art by Mike Deodato, Jr. and Scot Eaton, 2008)
      - Includes the "One Percenter" co-feature from Wolverine vol. 3 #74–75 (written by Way, art by Tommy Lee Edwards, 2009)
    - Wolverine by Daniel Way: The Complete Collection Volume 4 (collects #33–50, tpb, 480 pages, 2018, ISBN 1-302-90952-5)
      - Includes Dark Wolverine #85–86 (co-written by Way and Marjorie Liu, art by Stephen Segovia, 2010) as part of The Reckoning inter-title crossover.
  - Deadpool vol. 2 (with Paco Medina, Carlo Barberi, Shawn Crystal (#13–14, 55–57), Tan Eng Huat (#22), Bong Dazo (#30–31, 37–39), Sheldon Vella (#32 and 36), Jim Calafiore (#33.1), Salvador Espin (#45–49, 58–60), Scott Koblish (#49), John McCrea (#49.1), Alé Garza (#51–54, 61–62), Matteo Lolli (#62), Filipe Andrade (#63), 2008–2012) collected as:
    - Deadpool by Daniel Way: The Complete Collection Volume 1 (collects #1–12 and Wolverine: Origins #21–25, tpb, 472 pages, 2013, ISBN 0-7851-8532-1)
    - Deadpool by Daniel Way: The Complete Collection Volume 2 (collects #13–31, tpb, 464 pages, 2013, ISBN 0-7851-8547-X)
    - Deadpool by Daniel Way: The Complete Collection Volume 3 (collects #32–49, 33.1 and 49.1, tpb, 448 pages, 2014, ISBN 0-7851-8888-6)
    - Deadpool by Daniel Way: The Complete Collection Volume 4 (collects #50–63, tpb, 320 pages, 2014, ISBN 0-7851-6012-4)
    - Deadpool by Daniel Way: The Complete Collection Omnibus Volume 1 (collects #1–26, Wolverine: Origins #21–25 and the Hit-Monkey one-shot and limited series, hc, 896 pages, 2018, ISBN 1-302-91006-X)
    - Deadpool by Daniel Way: The Complete Collection Omnibus Volume 2 (collects #27–63, 33.1, 49.1 and the short story from Deadpool vol. 3 #27, hc, 880 pages, 2018, ISBN 1-302-91141-4)
  - Dark Wolverine (co-written by Way and Marjorie Liu, art by Giuseppe Camuncoli, Stephen Segovia, Paco Diaz (#80, 88–89) and Mirco Pierfederici (#87 and 90), 2009–2010) collected as:
    - The Prince (collects #75–78 and the co-features from Wolverine vol. 3 #74–75, hc, 112 pages, 2009, ISBN 0-7851-3900-1; tpb, 2010, ISBN 0-7851-3866-8)
    - My Hero (collects #79–81, hc, 112 pages, 2010, ISBN 0-7851-3977-X; tpb, 2010, ISBN 0-7851-3867-6)
    - Siege: X-Men (includes #82–84, hc, 136 pages, 2010, ISBN 0-7851-4815-9; tpb, 2011, ISBN 0-7851-4816-7)
    - Wolverine: The Reckoning (collects #85–87 and Wolverine: Origins #46–50, hc, 192 pages, 2010, ISBN 0-7851-3978-8; tpb, 2011, ISBN 0-7851-4038-7)
    - The Punisher: Franken-Castle (includes #88–89, hc, 344 pages, 2010, ISBN 0-7851-4754-3; tpb, 2011, ISBN 0-7851-4420-X)
  - Daken: Dark Wolverine (co-written by Way and Marjorie Liu, art by Giuseppe Camuncoli, Agustín Padilla (#7) and Marco Checchetto (#8–9), 2010–2011) collected as:
    - Empire (collects #1–4 and Dark Wolverine #90, hc, 168 pages, 2011, ISBN 0-7851-4705-5; tpb, 2011, ISBN 0-7851-4706-3)
    - Daken/X-23: Collision (includes #5–9, hc, 200 pages, 2011, ISBN 0-7851-4707-1; tpb, 2012, ISBN 0-7851-4708-X)
      - Includes the "Brace for Impact" short story (co-written by Way and Marjorie Liu, art by Giuseppe Camuncoli and Will Conrad) from Wolverine: Road to Hell (promotional one-shot, 2010)
  - Astonishing X-Men vol. 3 #36–37, 39, 41 (with Jason Pearson (#36–37), Sara Pichelli (#37) and Nick Bradshaw, 2011) collected as Astonishing X-Men: Monstrous (hc, 112 pages, 2011, ISBN 0-7851-5114-1; tpb, 2012, ISBN 0-7851-5115-X)
  - Deadpool vol. 3 #27: "The Space Racist" (with Carlo Barberi, co-feature, 2014) collected in Deadpool: The Wedding (tpb, 168 pages, 2014, ISBN 0-7851-8933-5)
  - Deadpool: Nerdy 30: "No Chill Whatsoever" (with Paco Medina, anthology one-shot, 2021)
- Ant-Man (with Clayton Crain, unreleased 5-issue limited series intended for publication under the Marvel MAX imprint, announced for 2003)
  - Four issues were solicited before the series was pulled off schedule.
  - A collected edition was solicited for a 2004 release but also subsequently cancelled: Ant-Man, Volume 1 (tpb, 120 pages, ISBN 0-7851-1329-0)
- Deathlok: Detour (with Darick Robertson, unreleased 5-issue limited series intended for publication under the Marvel MAX imprint, announced for 2004)
  - Two issues were solicited before the series was pulled off schedule.
  - When reached for comment on the book's status in late 2011, Marvel responded that they're still "waiting for the right time to launch the title."
- Bullseye: Greatest Hits #1–5 (with Steve Dillon, Marvel Knights, 2004–2005) collected as Bullseye: Greatest Hits (tpb, 120 pages, 2005, ISBN 0-7851-1512-9)
- Supreme Power: Nighthawk #1–6 (with Steve Dillon, Marvel MAX, 2005–2006) collected as Supreme Power: Nighthawk (tpb, 144 pages, 2006, ISBN 0-7851-1897-7; hc, 2009, ISBN 0-7851-3775-0)
- Punisher vs. Bullseye #1–5 (with Steve Dillon, Marvel Knights, 2006) collected as Punisher vs. Bullseye (tpb, 120 pages, 2006, ISBN 0-7851-1735-0)
- The Incredible Hulk vol. 2 #88–91: "Peace in Our Time" (with Keu Cha (#88–89) and Juan Santacruz (#90–91), 2006)
  - Collected as The Incredible Hulk: Prelude to Planet Hulk (tpb, 96 pages, 2006, ISBN 0-7851-1953-1)
  - Collected in Hulk: Planet Hulk Omnibus (hc, 656 pages, 2017, ISBN 1-302-90769-7)
- Amazing Fantasy vol. 2 #15: "The Man with X-Ray Eyes" (with Nick Dragotta, anthology, 2006)
- Ghost Rider vol. 5 (with Javier Saltares, Richard Corben (#6–7) and Mark Texeira (#8–11), 2006–2008) collected as:
  - Vicious Cycle (collects #1–5, tpb, 120 pages, 2007, ISBN 0-7851-2296-6)
  - Life and Death of Johnny Blaze (collects #6–11, tpb, 144 pages, 2007, ISBN 0-7851-2297-4)
  - Apocalypse Soon (includes #12–13, tpb, 96 pages, 2008, ISBN 0-7851-2556-6)
  - Revelations (collects #14–19, tpb, 144 pages, 2008, ISBN 0-7851-2965-0)
  - Ultimate Collection: Ghost Rider by Daniel Way (collects #1–19, tpb, 448 pages, 2012, ISBN 0-7851-6447-2)
- Marvel Adventures Fantastic Four #30: "Doing More" (with Steve Scott, Marvel Adventures, 2008) collected in Marvel Adventures Fantastic Four: Monsters, Moles, Cowboys and Coupons (digest-sized tpb, 96 pages, 2008, ISBN 0-7851-2486-1)
- Starr the Slayer #1–4 (with Richard Corben, Marvel MAX, 2009–2010) collected as Starr the Slayer: A Starr is Born (tpb, 96 pages, 2010, ISBN 0-7851-3271-6)
- Hit-Monkey: Bullets and Bananas (tpb, 168 pages, 2019, ISBN 1-302-92035-9) collects:
  - Hit-Monkey (with Dalibor Talajić, digital one-shot, 2010) published in print as Hit-Monkey (one-shot, April 2010)
  - Hit-Monkey #1–3: "Year of the Monkey" (with Dalibor Talajić, 2010)
- Thunderbolts vol. 2 (with Steve Dillon and Phil Noto, 2013) collected as:
  - No Quarter (collects #1–6, tpb, 136 pages, 2013, ISBN 0-7851-6694-7)
  - Red Scare (collects #7–11, tpb, 136 pages, 2013, ISBN 0-7851-6695-5)

=== Other publishers ===
- Crossed: Badlands #44–49: "Grave New World" (with Emiliano Urdinola, Avatar, 2013–2014) collected as Crossed Volume 9 (tpb, 176 pages, 2014, ISBN 1-59291-226-5)
- EVE: True Stories #1–4 (with Tomm Coker (#1), Alejandro Aragón (#2), Federico Dallocchio (#3) and Daniel Warren Johnson (#4), digital, Dark Horse, 2014) collected as EVE: True Stories (hc, 80 pages, 2014, ISBN 1-61655-272-7)
- Kill-Crazy Nymphos Attack! (co-written by Way with Jen and Sylvia Soska, art by Rob Dumo, graphic novel self-published via Kickstarter, 144 pages, 2018, ISBN 978-0-692-18920-7)
- Hit-Girl: Season Two #5–8: "Hong Kong" (with Goran Parlov, Image, 2019) collected as Hit-Girl in Hong Kong (tpb, 112 pages, 2019, ISBN 1-5343-1407-5)

Preceded by Frank Tieri	Wolverine writer 2003	Succeeded by Greg Rucka
Preceded by n/a	Venom writer 2003–2004	Succeeded by Rick Remender
Preceded by Mark Millar	Wolverine writer 2005–2006	Succeeded by Marc Guggenheim
Preceded by Peter David	Incredible Hulk writer 2006	Succeeded by Greg Pak
Preceded by Garth Ennis	Ghost Rider writer 2006–2008	Succeeded by Jason Aaron
Preceded by Fabian Nicieza (Cable and Deadpool); Gail Simone (Deadpool vol. 1)	Deadpool writer 2008–2012	Succeeded by Brian Posehn; Gerry Duggan (Deadpool vol. 3)
Preceded by Warren Ellis	Astonishing X-Men writer 2011 (with Christos Gage)	Succeeded by Greg Pak
Preceded by Jeff Parker	Thunderbolts writer 2013	Succeeded by Charles Soule
