= Wolverine: Origins =

Comic book series

- Cover for Wolverine: Origins #1; Art by Richard Isanove and Joe Quesada.

Publication information
- Publisher: Marvel Comics
- Schedule: Monthly
- Format: Ongoing series
- Genre: Superhero
- Publication date: June 2006 – September 2010
- No. of issues: 50; 1 Annual
- Main character: Wolverine

Creative team
- Created by: Daniel Way; Steve Dillon
- Written by: Daniel Way
- Artist(s): #1–25: Steve Dillon

Wolverine: Origins is an American comic book series written by Daniel Way, published by Marvel Comics and starring Wolverine. Steve Dillon drew the series from the first issue through issue #25. It is the first series to feature Daken, the son of Wolverine.

== Publication history ==
The series is a continuation of House of M and the "Origins and Endings" storyline from Wolverine (vol. 3) #36–40 (2006). It began publication in June 2006 and ran for fifty issues, including one annual. During its run, it crossed over with the Dark Reign storyline.

== Plot ==
=== Daken ===
In an attempt to prevent Wolverine from finding them, some members of the government send Nuke to stop him. Captain America, Cyclops, Emma Frost, and Hellion intervene. Frost reveals that Wolverine has a son, Daken, who is being controlled by the government the way Wolverine had been, and that he hates his father.

Hoping to rescue his son from whoever is controlling him, Wolverine plans to weaken Daken with adamantium power Dido's, eventually focusing his efforts on acquiring the substance from Maverick, a fellow victim/member with Logan in the secretive governmental Weapon X program during the 1960s. Before Wolverine can learn where the carbonadium is, they are attacked by Omega Red. Wolverine is briefly knocked unconscious, giving Omega Red a head start for the carbonadium, which is in Berlin.

Wolverine travels to Berlin and meets up with the Black Widow. Wolverine surrenders to agents of S.H.I.E.L.D. who have been following him. He is taken to a S.H.I.E.L.D. base and placed in restraints. Daken, disguised as a S.H.I.E.L.D agent, uses his bone claws to wound Wolverine. After healing, Wolverine escapes from the facility.

Wolverine catches up to his son, only to find Daken being attacked by Cyber. Wolverine saves Daken, allowing him to escape.

In an elaborate plan to draw Daken into the open, Wolverine arranges for the Winter Soldier to hire Deadpool to kill Wolverine. When Wolverine is incapacitated and Deadpool appears close to succeeding, Daken intervenes so he can be the one to kill his father. The Winter Soldier, who has been watching, shoots Daken in the head with a carbonadium bullet. This renders Daken unconscious, but does not kill him.

=== Romulus ===
Wolverine seeks out Professor X for help restoring his son's lost memories. Wolverine learns that Daken is being manipulated by a man named Romulus, the same man who manipulated Wolverine before Weapon X. Wolverine and Professor Xavier are able to save Daken and reveal to him the truth surrounding his mother's death. Father and son plan to track Romulus together and kill him. Daken later betrays Wolverine to ally with Cyber, and then betrays Cyber to hunt Romulus alone.

When Daken joins the Dark Avengers, Wolverine meets with Nick Fury. Fury shares his information on Romulus, including Wolverine's close connection to the Hudson family. Fury accompanies Wolverine to New York to stop Daken's attack on the X-Men, but Daken escapes again.

Wolverine tracks Daken, but is confronted by Victor Hudson, one of Romulus's henchmen. Forced to choose between chasing Romulus or Daken, Wolverine chooses Daken. Meanwhile, Daken has employed the Tinkerer to turn his claws more like his father's.

Wolverine continues to track down Romulus and Victor Hudson in Russia. Following Hudson, Wolverine believes he is close to Romulus when he discovers he has been led into a trap. He is attacked by and defeats Omega Red. He escapes the trap with the carbonadium synthesizer.

== Collected editions ==
Title	Material collected	Publication date	ISBN
Wolverine: Origins Vol. 1: Born in Blood	Wolverine: Origins #1–5	October 2006	978-0785122876
Wolverine: Origins Vol. 2: Savior	Wolverine: Origins #6–10	March 2007	978-0785122883
Wolverine: Origins Vol. 3: Swift and Terrible	Wolverine: Origins #11–15	November 2007	978-0785126133
Wolverine: Origins Vol. 4: Our War	Wolverine: Origins #16–20, Annual #1	February 2008	978-0785126386
Wolverine: Origins Vol. 5: Deadpool	Wolverine: Origins #21–27	December 2008	978-0785126157
X-Men: Original Sin	Wolverine: Origins #28–30; X-Men: Original Sin #1; X-Men: Legacy #217–218	August 2009	978-0785129561
Wolverine: Origins Vol. 6: Dark Reign	Wolverine: Origins #31–36	December 2009	978-0785135388
Wolverine: Origins Vol. 7: Romulus	Wolverine: Origins #37–40	December 2009	978-0785135395
Wolverine: Origins Vol. 8: Seven the Hard Way	Wolverine: Origins #41–45	April 2010	978-0785146490
Wolverine: The Reckoning	Wolverine: Origins #46–50; Dark Wolverine #85–87	October 2010	978-0785140382
Wolverine by Daniel Way: The Complete Collection Vol. 1	Wolverine (vol. 2) #187–189, (vol. 3) #33–40; Wolverine: Origins #1–5; Wolverine: Origins Director's Cut#1; Sabretooth(vol. 3) #1–4;"The Promise" story from I (heart) Marvel: My Mutant Heart #1	January 2017	978-1302904722
Wolverine by Daniel Way: The Complete Collection Vol. 2	Wolverine: Origins #6–15, Annual #1; Wolverine (vol. 3) #50–55; What If: Wolverine #1	September 2017	978-1302907389
Wolverine by Daniel Way: The Complete Collection Vol. 3	Wolverine: Origins #16–32; X-Men: Original Sin; X-Men: Legacy #217–218; "One Percenter" stories from Wolverine (vol. 3) #73–74	January 2018	978-1302907686
Wolverine by Daniel Way: The Complete Collection Vol. 4	Wolverine: Origins #33–50; Dark Wolverine #85–87	June 2018	978-1302909529
