= List of Wolverine titles =

== Marvel Essentials ==
Marvel Essential editions reprint material in black and white.

Title	Vol.	Material collected	Publication date	ISBN
Essential Wolverine	1	Wolverine (vol. 2) #1–23	February 2009	978-0-7851-3566-1
Essential Wolverine	2	Wolverine (vol. 2) #24–47	March 2002	978-0-7851-0550-3
Essential Wolverine	3	Wolverine (vol. 2) #48–69	March 2002	978-0-7851-0595-4
Essential Wolverine	4	Wolverine (vol. 2) #70–90	May 2006	978-0-7851-2059-9
Essential Wolverine	5	Wolverine (vol. 2) #91–110, Annual '96; Uncanny X-Men #332	December 2008	978-0-7851-3077-2
Essential Wolverine	6	Wolverine (vol. 2) #111–128, −1, Annual '97	November 2012	978-0-7851-6352-7
Essential Wolverine	7	Wolverine (vol. 2) #129–148; Hulk (vol. 1) #8	May 2013	978-0-7851-8408-9

== Epic Collection ==
Title	Vol.	Vol. title	Material collected	Publication date	ISBN
Wolverine Epic Collection	1	Madripoor Nights	Wolverine (vol. 2) #1–16; material from Marvel Comics Presents #1–10; Marvel Age Annual #4	December 2014	978-0-7851-8903-9
Wolverine Epic Collection	2	Back to Basics	Wolverine (vol. 2) #17–30; Wolverine/Nick Fury: The Scorpio Connection; Wolverine: The Jungle Adventure	March 2019	978-1-302-91609-1
Wolverine Epic Collection	3	Blood and Claws	Wolverine (vol. 2) #31–44 (1988), Wolverine: Bloodlust (1990) 1, Wolverine: Bloody Choices (1991) 1	July 2021	978-1-302-93089-9
Wolverine Epic Collection	6	Inner Fury	Wolverine (vol. 2) #69–75; Wolverine: Inner Fury; Wolverine: Killing; Wolverine: Global Jeopardy; Sabretooth (vol. 1) #1–4; X-Men (vol. 2) #25	March 2020	978-1-302-92390-7
Wolverine Epic Collection	7	To the Bone	Wolverine (vol. 2) #76-86; Wolverine: Evilution; Wolverine & Nick Fury: Scorpio Rising; Ghost Rider, Wolverine, Punisher: The Dark Design; Cable #16	June 2023	
Wolverine Epic Collection	8	The Dying Game	Wolverine (vol. 2) #87–100; Wolverine Annual '95; Wolverine: Knight of Terra	December 2015	978-0-7851-9261-9
Wolverine Epic Collection	9	Tooth and Claw	Wolverine (1988) #101-109, 102.5;Wolverine Annual '96; Uncanny X-Men (1981) #332; Venom: Tooth and Claw (1996) #1-3; Logan: Path of the Warlord (1996) #1; Logan: Shadow Society (1996) #1	June 14, 2022	
Wolverine Epic Collection	12	Shadow of Apocalypse	Wolverine (vol. 2) #133–149; Hulk (vol. 1) #8; Wolverine/Cable: Guts'n'Glory	February 2017	978-1-302-90385-5
Wolverine Epic Collection	13	Blood Debt	Wolverine (vol. 2) #150–158; Wolverine Annual '99; Wolverine: The Origin #1–6	March 2018	978-1-302-91022-8
Wolverine Epic Collection	14	The Return of Weapon X	Wolverine (vol. 2) #159-172, Wolverine Annual 2000–2001	March 26, 2024	978-1-302-95811-4
Wolverine Epic Collection	15	Law of the Jungle	Wolverine (vol. 2) #173-189	March 25, 2025	978-1-302-96413-9

== Wolverine Omnibus ==
#	Title	Years covered	Material collected	Pages	Released	ISBN
1	Wolverine Vol. 1	1974-1989, 1991	Marvel Comics Presents #1–10, 72–84; Incredible Hulk #180–182, 340; Marvel Treasury Edition #26; Best of Marvel Comics; Wolverine (1982) #1–4; Uncanny X-Men #172–173; Kitty Pryde and Wolverine #1–6; Captain America Annual #8; Spider-Man vs. Wolverine #1; Marvel Age Annual #4; Wolverine (1988) #1–10; The Punisher War Journal #6–7	1,064	1 Apr 2009	Frank Miller cover: 978-0-7851-3477-0
1	Wolverine Vol. 1	1974-1989, 1991	Marvel Comics Presents #1–10, 72–84; Incredible Hulk #180–182, 340; Marvel Treasury Edition #26; Best of Marvel Comics; Wolverine (1982) #1–4; Uncanny X-Men #172–173; Kitty Pryde and Wolverine #1–6; Captain America Annual #8; Spider-Man vs. Wolverine #1; Marvel Age Annual #4; Wolverine (1988) #1–10; The Punisher War Journal #6–7	1,064	1 Apr 2009	Steve McNiven DM cover: 978-0-7851-3665-1
1	Wolverine Vol. 1	1974-1989, 1991	Marvel Comics Presents #1–10, 72–84; Incredible Hulk #180–182, 340; Marvel Treasury Edition #26; Best of Marvel Comics; Wolverine (1982) #1–4; Uncanny X-Men #172–173; Kitty Pryde and Wolverine #1–6; Captain America Annual #8; Spider-Man vs. Wolverine #1; Marvel Age Annual #4; Wolverine (1988) #1–10; The Punisher War Journal #6–7	1,064	7 Apr 2020	Frank Miller cover: 978-1-302-92267-2
1	Wolverine Vol. 1	1974-1989, 1991	Marvel Comics Presents #1–10, 72–84; Incredible Hulk #180–182, 340; Marvel Treasury Edition #26; Best of Marvel Comics; Wolverine (1982) #1–4; Uncanny X-Men #172–173; Kitty Pryde and Wolverine #1–6; Captain America Annual #8; Spider-Man vs. Wolverine #1; Marvel Age Annual #4; Wolverine (1988) #1–10; The Punisher War Journal #6–7	1,064	7 Apr 2020	Steve McNiven DM cover: 978-1-302-92383-9
2	Wolverine Vol. 2	1989-1990	Wolverine (1988) #11–30; Havok & Wolverine: Meltdown #1–4; Wolverine/Nick Fury: The Scorpio Connection; Wolverine: The Jungle Adventure; Wolverine: Bloodlust; material from Marvel Comics Presents #38–71	1,248	4 Aug 2021	Jim Lee cover: 978-1-302-92995-4
2	Wolverine Vol. 2	1989-1990	Wolverine (1988) #11–30; Havok & Wolverine: Meltdown #1–4; Wolverine/Nick Fury: The Scorpio Connection; Wolverine: The Jungle Adventure; Wolverine: Bloodlust; material from Marvel Comics Presents #38–71	1,248	4 Aug 2021	Barry Windsor-Smith DM cover: 978-1-302-93052-3
2	Wolverine Vol. 2	1989-1990	Wolverine (1988) #11–30; Havok & Wolverine: Meltdown #1–4; Wolverine/Nick Fury: The Scorpio Connection; Wolverine: The Jungle Adventure; Wolverine: Bloodlust; material from Marvel Comics Presents #38–71	1,248	4 Aug 2021	John Byrne DM cover: 978-1-302-92996-1
2	Wolverine Vol. 2	1989-1990	Wolverine (1988) #11–30; Havok & Wolverine: Meltdown #1–4; Wolverine/Nick Fury: The Scorpio Connection; Wolverine: The Jungle Adventure; Wolverine: Bloodlust; material from Marvel Comics Presents #38–71	1,248	8 Nov 2022	Jim Lee cover: 978-1-302-94513-8
2	Wolverine Vol. 2	1989-1990	Wolverine (1988) #11–30; Havok & Wolverine: Meltdown #1–4; Wolverine/Nick Fury: The Scorpio Connection; Wolverine: The Jungle Adventure; Wolverine: Bloodlust; material from Marvel Comics Presents #38–71	1,248	8 Nov 2022	Barry Windsor-Smith DM cover: 978-1-302-94514-5
2	Wolverine Vol. 2	1989-1990	Wolverine (1988) #11–30; Havok & Wolverine: Meltdown #1–4; Wolverine/Nick Fury: The Scorpio Connection; Wolverine: The Jungle Adventure; Wolverine: Bloodlust; material from Marvel Comics Presents #38–71	1,248	8 Nov 2022	John Byrne DM cover: 978-1-302-94512-1
3	Wolverine Vol. 3	1990-1992	Wolverine (1988) #31-59; Wolverine: Bloody Choices; Wolverine: Rahne of Terra; Ghost Rider/Wolverine/Punisher: Hearts of Darkness; X-Men (1991) #4–7; material from Marvel Fanfare #54–55 and Marvel Comics Presents #85–108	1,264	17 Jan 2023	Marc Silvestri cover: 978-1-302-94651-7
3	Wolverine Vol. 3	1990-1992	Wolverine (1988) #31-59; Wolverine: Bloody Choices; Wolverine: Rahne of Terra; Ghost Rider/Wolverine/Punisher: Hearts of Darkness; X-Men (1991) #4–7; material from Marvel Fanfare #54–55 and Marvel Comics Presents #85–108	1,264	17 Jan 2023	Jim Lee DM cover: 978-1-302-94652-4
3	Wolverine Vol. 3	1990-1992	Wolverine (1988) #31-59; Wolverine: Bloody Choices; Wolverine: Rahne of Terra; Ghost Rider/Wolverine/Punisher: Hearts of Darkness; X-Men (1991) #4–7; material from Marvel Fanfare #54–55 and Marvel Comics Presents #85–108	1,264	17 Jan 2023	Michael Avon Oeming DM cover: 978-1-302-94839-9
4	Wolverine Vol. 4	1992-1993	Wolverine (1988) #60–75; Wolverine: Inner Fury; Wolverine: Killing; Wolverine: Global Jeopardy; Wolverine and the Punisher: Damaging Evidence #1–3; Sabretooth #1–4; Spider-Man/Punisher/Sabretooth: Designer Genes; X-Men (1991) #25; material from Marvel Comics Presents #109–142 and Marvel Holiday Special #2	1,176	12 Sep 2023	Adam Kubert cover: 978-1-302-95399-7
4	Wolverine Vol. 4	1992-1993	Wolverine (1988) #60–75; Wolverine: Inner Fury; Wolverine: Killing; Wolverine: Global Jeopardy; Wolverine and the Punisher: Damaging Evidence #1–3; Sabretooth #1–4; Spider-Man/Punisher/Sabretooth: Designer Genes; X-Men (1991) #25; material from Marvel Comics Presents #109–142 and Marvel Holiday Special #2	1,176	12 Sep 2023	Andy Kubert Magneto DM cover: 978-1-302-95400-0
4	Wolverine Vol. 4	1992-1993	Wolverine (1988) #60–75; Wolverine: Inner Fury; Wolverine: Killing; Wolverine: Global Jeopardy; Wolverine and the Punisher: Damaging Evidence #1–3; Sabretooth #1–4; Spider-Man/Punisher/Sabretooth: Designer Genes; X-Men (1991) #25; material from Marvel Comics Presents #109–142 and Marvel Holiday Special #2	1,176	12 Sep 2023	Mark Texeira Sabretooth DM cover: 978-1-302-95401-7
5	Wolverine Vol. 5	1993-1996	Wolverine (1988) #76-101; Wolverine Annual '95; Marvel Comics Presents #150-151, 152-155 (A stories); Cable #16; Wolverine: Evilution #1; Wolverine & Nick Fury: Scorpio Rising #1 Ghost Rider/Wolverine/Punisher: The Dark Design #1; Wolverine: Knight of Terra #1; Wolverine/Gambit: Victims #1-4; Uncanny X-Men #332; Logan: Path of the Warlord #1	1,296	14 May 2024	Adam Kubert cover: 978-1-302-95806-0
5	Wolverine Vol. 5	1993-1996	Wolverine (1988) #76-101; Wolverine Annual '95; Marvel Comics Presents #150-151, 152-155 (A stories); Cable #16; Wolverine: Evilution #1; Wolverine & Nick Fury: Scorpio Rising #1 Ghost Rider/Wolverine/Punisher: The Dark Design #1; Wolverine: Knight of Terra #1; Wolverine/Gambit: Victims #1-4; Uncanny X-Men #332; Logan: Path of the Warlord #1	1,296	14 May 2024	Ian Churchill Cyber DM cover: 978-1-302-95807-7
5	Wolverine Vol. 5	1993-1996	Wolverine (1988) #76-101; Wolverine Annual '95; Marvel Comics Presents #150-151, 152-155 (A stories); Cable #16; Wolverine: Evilution #1; Wolverine & Nick Fury: Scorpio Rising #1 Ghost Rider/Wolverine/Punisher: The Dark Design #1; Wolverine: Knight of Terra #1; Wolverine/Gambit: Victims #1-4; Uncanny X-Men #332; Logan: Path of the Warlord #1	1,296	14 May 2024	Tim Sale Gambit DM cover: 978-1-302-95810-7
6	Wolverine Vol. 6	1996-1997, 2000	Wolverine (1988) #102-118, -1, 1/2, 102.5; Wolverine Annual '96-97; Logan: Shadow Society (1996) #1; Venom: Tooth and Claw (1996) #1-3; Maverick (1997a) #1; Wolverine: Doombringer (1997) #1; Kitty Pryde: Agent of S.H.I.E.L.D. (1997) #1-3; Before the Fantastic Four: Ben Grimm and Logan (2000) #1-3; Wolverine: Days of Future Past (1997) #1-3; Wolverine Encyclopedia (1996) #1-2; material from Marvel: Shadows and Light (1997) #1	1,152	27 May 2025	Leinil Francis Yu cover: 978-1-302-96431-3
6	Wolverine Vol. 6	1996-1997, 2000	Wolverine (1988) #102-118, -1, 1/2, 102.5; Wolverine Annual '96-97; Logan: Shadow Society (1996) #1; Venom: Tooth and Claw (1996) #1-3; Maverick (1997a) #1; Wolverine: Doombringer (1997) #1; Kitty Pryde: Agent of S.H.I.E.L.D. (1997) #1-3; Before the Fantastic Four: Ben Grimm and Logan (2000) #1-3; Wolverine: Days of Future Past (1997) #1-3; Wolverine Encyclopedia (1996) #1-2; material from Marvel: Shadows and Light (1997) #1	1,152	27 May 2025	David Winn DM cover: 978-1-302-96432-0
	Weapon X: The Return	2001-2004, 2014	Wolverine (1988) #162–166, 173–174, 176; Deadpool (1997) #57–60; Weapon X (2002) #1–28, 1/2; Weapon X: The Draft - Sauron, Wild Child, Kane, Marrow and Agent Zero; Weapon X: Days of Future Now #1–5; material from Wolverine (1988) #175 and Deadpool (2012) #27	1,280	15 May 2018	Bart Sears cover: 978-1-302-91182-9
	Wolverine by Mark Millar	2004-2009	Wolverine (2003) #20–32, 66–72; Wolverine: Giant-Size Old Man Logan	576	2 Jul 2013	Joe Quesada cover: 978-0-7851-6796-9
1	Wolverine by Jason Aaron Vol. 1	2007-2010, 2002	Wolverine (2003) #56, 62–65; Wolverine: Manifest Destiny #1–4; Wolverine: Weapon X #1–16; Dark Reign: The List – Wolverine; material from Wolverine (2003) #73–74, Dark X-Men: The Beginning #3 and Wolverine (1988) #175	688	1 Jul 2011	David Finch cover: 978-0-7851-5639-0
1	Wolverine by Jason Aaron Vol. 1	2007-2010, 2002	Wolverine (2003) #56, 62–65; Wolverine: Manifest Destiny #1–4; Wolverine: Weapon X #1–16; Dark Reign: The List – Wolverine; material from Wolverine (2003) #73–74, Dark X-Men: The Beginning #3 and Wolverine (1988) #175	688	15 Apr 2025	David Finch cover: 978-1-302-96136-7
1	Wolverine by Jason Aaron Vol. 1	2007-2010, 2002	Wolverine (2003) #56, 62–65; Wolverine: Manifest Destiny #1–4; Wolverine: Weapon X #1–16; Dark Reign: The List – Wolverine; material from Wolverine (2003) #73–74, Dark X-Men: The Beginning #3 and Wolverine (1988) #175	688	15 Apr 2025	Adam Kubert Motorbike DM cover: 978-1-302-96137-4
	Wolverine and the X-Men by Jason Aaron	2011-2014	Wolverine and the X-Men #1–35, 38–42, Annual #1	928	17 Jun 2014	978-0-7851-9024-0
	Wolverine and the X-Men by Jason Aaron	2011-2014	Wolverine and the X-Men #1–35, 38–42, Annual #1	928	2 Feb 2022	Chris Bachalo cover: 978-1-302-93245-9
	Wolverine and the X-Men by Jason Aaron	2011-2014	Wolverine and the X-Men #1–35, 38–42, Annual #1	928	2 Feb 2022	Stuart Immonen DM cover: 978-1-302-93245-9
	Wolverine Goes To Hell	2010-2012	Astonishing Spider-Man and Wolverine #1–6; Wolverine (2010) #1–20, 5.1, 300–304; X-Men: Schism #1–5; material from Wolverine: Road to Hell	984	15 May 2018	Jae Lee cover: 978-1-302-91159-1
	Wolverine Goes To Hell	2010-2012	Astonishing Spider-Man and Wolverine #1–6; Wolverine (2010) #1–20, 5.1, 300–304; X-Men: Schism #1–5; material from Wolverine: Road to Hell	984	22 Jul 2025	Jae Lee cover: 978-1-302-96138-1
	Wolverine Goes To Hell	2010-2012	Astonishing Spider-Man and Wolverine #1–6; Wolverine (2010) #1–20, 5.1, 300–304; X-Men: Schism #1–5; material from Wolverine: Road to Hell	984	22 Jul 2025	DM cover: TBC
	Death of Wolverine	2013-2014	Wolverine (2013) #1-13, Wolverine (2014) #1-12, Annual #1, Marvel 75th Anniversary Celebration #1 (Wolverine story), Death of Wolverine #1-4, Death of Wolverine: The Weapon X Program #1-5, Death of Wolverine: The Logan Legacy #1-7, Death of Wolverine: Deadpool & Captain America #1, Death of Wolverine: Life After Logan #1, Nightcrawler (2014) #7, Wolverine & The X-Men (2014) #10-11, Storm (2014) #4-5	1,232	26 Nov 2024	Alex Ross cover: 978-1-302-95987-6
	Death of Wolverine	2013-2014	Wolverine (2013) #1-13, Wolverine (2014) #1-12, Annual #1, Marvel 75th Anniversary Celebration #1 (Wolverine story), Death of Wolverine #1-4, Death of Wolverine: The Weapon X Program #1-5, Death of Wolverine: The Logan Legacy #1-7, Death of Wolverine: Deadpool & Captain America #1, Death of Wolverine: Life After Logan #1, Nightcrawler (2014) #7, Wolverine & The X-Men (2014) #10-11, Storm (2014) #4-5	1,232	26 Nov 2024	Joe Quesada DM cover: 978-1-302-95988-3
	Wolverine: Sabretooth War	2022-2024	Sabretooth (2022) #1-5, Sabretooth & the Exiles (2022) #1-5, Wolverine (2020) #41-50	592	3 Jun 2025	Leinil Francis Yu cover: 978-1-302-96140-4
	Wolverine: Sabretooth War	2022-2024	Sabretooth (2022) #1-5, Sabretooth & the Exiles (2022) #1-5, Wolverine (2020) #41-50	592	3 Jun 2025	Greg Capullo DM cover: 978-1-302-96141-1

== Oversized hardcovers ==
Title	Vol.	Material collected	Publication date	ISBN
The Best of Wolverine	1	Wolverine (vol. 1) #1–4; Marvel Comics Presents #72–84; The Incredible Hulk #181; Uncanny X-Men #205; Captain America Annual #8	October 2004	978-0-7851-1370-6
House of M: Wolverine, Iron Man & Hulk		Wolverine vol.3 #33-35, Iron Man: House of M #1-3, Incredible Hulk #83-87, Captain America #10, Pulse #10, and Cable & Deadpool #17	February 2010	978-0-7851-3882-2
Acts of Vengeance Crossovers Omnibus		Wolverine vol.2 (1988) #19-20; Fantastic Four #334-336; Doctor Strange, Sorcerer Supreme #11-13; Incredible Hulk #363; Punisher (1987) #28-29; Punisher War Journal (1988) #12-13; Marc Spector: Moon Knight #8-10; Daredevil #275-276; Power Pack (1984) #53; Alpha Flight (1983) #79-80; New Mutants (1983) #84-86; Uncanny X-Men #256-258; X-Factor (1986) #49-50; Damage Control (1989, volume 2) #1-4; Web of Spider-Man (1985) #64-65	July 2011	0-7851-4488-9
X-Men: Fatal Attractions		Wolverine #75; Uncanny X-Men #298–305 and 315, Annual #17; X-Factor #87–92; X-Men Unlimited #1–2; X-Force #25; X-Men #25; Excalibur #71	April 2012	978-0-7851-6245-2
Wolverine: The Adamantium Collection		Origin #1-6; material from Marvel Comics presents (1988) #72-84; Uncanny X-Men (1963) #162, 205, 268; Wolverine (vol. 1) #1-4; Wolverine (vol. 2) #75, 119–122; Wolverine (1988) (vol. 2) #75, 119–122, Wolverine (2003) #32; Wolverine & The X-Men 1–3	June 2013	978-0-7851-6789-1
X-Men: Battle of the Atom		Wolverine and the X-Men vol.1 #36-37; X-Men: Battle of the Atom (vol. 1) #1-2; All-New X-Men #16-17; X-Men (vol. 4) #5-6; Uncanny X-Men (vol. 3) #12-13	January 2014	978-0-7851-8906-0
Wolverine: Japan's Most Wanted		Wolverine: Japan's Most Wanted #1-13	June 2014	
X-Men: Phalanx Covenant		Wolverine #85; Uncanny X-Men #306, #311–314 and #316–317; Excalibur #78–82; X-Men #36–37; X-Factor #106; X-Force #38; Cable #16	February 2014	978-0-7851-8549-9
X-Men / Avengers: Onslaught Omnibus		Wolverine #104-105; Cable #32-36; Uncanny X-Men #333-337; X-Force #55, #57-58; X-Man #15-19; X-Men #53-57, Annual '96; X-Men Unlimited #11; Onslaught: X-Men, Marvel Universe, Epilogue; Avengers #401-402; Fantastic Four #415; Incredible Hulk #444-445; X-Factor #125-126; Amazing Spider-Man #415; Green Goblin #12; Spider-Man #72; Iron Man #332; Punisher #11; Thor #502; X-Men: Road to Onslaught #1; material from Excalibur #100, Fantastic Four #416	July 2015	0-7851-9262-X
Marvel Universe by John Byrne Omnibus	1	Wolverine (1988) #17–23; Champions #11–15; Marvel Preview #11; Avengers (1963) #164–166, 181–191; Power Man #48-50; Marvel Premiere #47-48; Captain America (1968) #247-255; Silver Surfer (1982) #1; Incredible Hulk (1968) #314-319; Marvel Fanfare (1982) #29	April 2016	978-0-7851-9560-3
Deadpool: Beginnings Omnibus		Wolverine vol.2 #88, #154-155; New Mutants #98; X-Force #2, #11, #15, #47, #56; Nomad #4; Deadpool: The Circle Chase #1-4; Secret Defenders #15-17; Deadpool #1-4; Heroes For Hire #10-11; Deadpool Team-Up #1; material from Avengers #366; Silver Sable and the Wild Pack #23; Wolverine Annual '95, '99; Deadpool cameo pages	January 2017	978-1-302-90429-6
Wolverine: Origin – The Complete Collection		Origin #1–6; Origin II #1–5	January 2017	978-1-302-90471-5
Deadpool by Daniel Way Omnibus	1	Wolverine: Origins #21-25; Deadpool (2008) #1-26; Thunderbolts (1997) #130-131; Hit-Monkey (2010A) #1, (2010B) #1-3; Deadpool Saga	February 2018	978-1-302-91006-8
Hunt for Wolverine		Hunt For Wolverine #1, Hunt For Wolverine: Weapon Lost #1-4, Hunt For Wolverine: Adamantium Agenda #1-4, Hunt For Wolverine: Claws Of A Killer #1-4, Hunt For Wolverine: Mystery In Madripoor #1-4, Where's Wolverine pages	November 2018	978-1-302-91301-4
Marvel Universe by Rob Liefeld Omnibus		Wolverine vol.2 (1988) #154-157; X-Factor (1986) 40, Uncanny X-Men (1981) 245, What If? (1989) 7, Captain America (1996) 1–6, Avengers (1996) 1–7, Onslaught Reborn 1–5; Material From Amazing Spider-Man Annual 23; Marvel Comics Presents (1988) 51–53, 85–86, 99, Heroes Reborn 1/2	October 2019	978-1-302-92002-9
X-Men vs Apocalypse: The Twelve Omnibus		Wolverine vol.2 (1988) #145-149; Uncanny X-Men (1981) #371-380, Annual'99; X-Men (1991) #91-93, #94 (A STORY), #95-99, Annual'99; X-Men Unlimited (1993) #24(A STORY), #25-26; Gambit (1999) #8-9; Astonishing X-Men (1999) #1-3; Cable (1993) #71-78; X-Man (1995) #59-60; X-51 (1999) #8; X-Force (1991) #101; X-Men 1999 Yearbook	February 2020	978-1-302-92287-0

== Thick Trade Paperbacks (Complete / Ultimate Collections) ==
Title	Vol.	Vol. title	Material collected	Publication date	ISBN
Wolverine: Prehistory			Marvel Comics Presents #93–98; Wolverine (vol. 3) #32; Logan: Path of the Warlord, Shadow Society; Wolverine: Agent of Atlas #1–3; First X-Men #1–5; Wolverine: Hunger; Wolverine (vol. 2) #-1; Before The Fantastic Four: Ben Grimm & Logan #1–3; Wolverine/Cable; Wolverine: The Amazing Immortal Man & Other Bloody Tales; Wolverine #1000	February 2017	978-1-302-90386-2
The Return of Weapon X			Wolverine vol. 2, #159–176 (1988), and ANNUAL 2000–2001	October 8, 2013	978-0-7851-8523-9
Wolverine Vs. the Marvel Universe			Marvel Comics Presents #117–122; Captain America Annual #8; Daredevil (vol. 1) #249; Spider-Man Vs. Wolverine; Incredible Hulk (vol. 1) #340; Wolverine (vol. 2) #134; Wolverine Vs. Thor #1–3; Marvel Universe Vs. Wolverine #1–4	March 2017	978-1-302-90465-4
Wolverine by Greg Rucka Ultimate Collection			Wolverine (vol. 3) #1–19	January 2012	978-0-7851-5845-5
Wolverine: Enemy of the State Ultimate Collection			Wolverine (vol. 3) #20–32	June 2008; October 2006	SC: 978-0-7851-3301-8; HC: 978-0-7851-2206-7
Wolverine by Daniel Way: The Complete Collection	1		Wolverine (1988) #187-189, Wolverine (2003) #33-40, Wolverine: Origins #1-5 and #1 Director's Cut, Sabretooth (2004) #1-4, and Material From I (Heart) Marvel: My Mutant Heart #1	January 2017	978-1-302-90472-2
Wolverine by Daniel Way: The Complete Collection	2		Wolverine (vol. 3) #50–55; Wolverine: Origins #6–15, Annual #1; What If: Wolverine #1	September 2017	978-1-302-90738-9
Wolverine by Daniel Way: The Complete Collection	3		Wolverine: Origins #16–32; X-Men: Original Sin #1; X-Men: Legacy #217–218; "One Percenter" stories from Wolverine (vol. 3) #73–74	February 2018	978-1-302-90768-6
Wolverine by Daniel Way: The Complete Collection	4		Wolverine: Origins #33–50; Dark Wolverine #85–86	June 2018	978-1-302-90952-9
Wolverine by Jason Aaron: The Complete Collection	1		Wolverine (vol. 3) #56, 62–65; material from #73–74; Wolverine: Manifest Destiny 1–4; Wolverine: Weapon X 1–5; material from Wolverine (vol. 2) #175	December 2013	978-0-7851-8541-3
Wolverine by Jason Aaron: The Complete Collection	2		Wolverine: Weapon X #6–16; Dark Reign: The List – Wolverine #1; Dark X-Men: The Beginning #3; All-New Wolverine Saga	April 2014	978-0-7851-8576-5
Wolverine by Jason Aaron: The Complete Collection	3		Wolverine (vol. 4) #1–9, 5.1; Astonishing Spider-Man & Wolverine #1–6; material from Wolverine: Road to Hell #1	August 2014	978-0-7851-8908-4
Wolverine by Jason Aaron: The Complete Collection	4		Wolverine (vol. 4) #10–20, 300–304	December 2014	978-0-7851-8909-1
Death of Wolverine	Prelude: Three Months To Die		Wolverine (vol. 6) #1–12, Annual #1	April 2020	978-1-302-92283-2
Death of Wolverine	The Complete Collection		Death of Wolverine #1–4; Death of Wolverine: The Weapon X Program #1–5; Death of Wolverine: Logan Legacy #1–7; Death of Wolverine: Deadpool & Captain America #1; Death of Wolverine: Life After Logan #1	May 2018	978-1-302-91242-0
Death of Wolverine	Companion		Wolverine & the X-Men (vol. 2) #10–11; Nightcrawler (vol. 4) #7; Wolverines #1–20	March 2019	978-1-302-91610-7
Hunt for Wolverine			Hunt For Wolverine #1, Hunt For Wolverine: Weapon Lost #1-4, Hunt For Wolverine: Adamantium Agenda #1-4, Hunt For Wolverine: Claws Of A Killer #1-4, Hunt For Wolverine: Mystery In Madripoor #1-4, Where's Wolverine pages	November 2018	HC: 978-1-302-91301-4
X Lives of Wolverine and X Deaths of Wolverine			X Lives of Wolverine (2022) #1-5, X Deaths of Wolverine (2022) #1-5	December 2022	HC: 978-1-302-93122-3 SC: 978-1-302-93123-0
Wolverine by Benjamin Percy	1		Wolverine (2020) #1-5, 8–12	April 2022	
Wolverine by Benjamin Percy	2		Wolverine (2020) #13-25	March 2023	
Wolverine by Benjamin Percy	3		Wolverine (2020) #26-32, #33 (A story) and #34-35 and #37-40..	June 2024	

== Main series ==
Title	Vol.	Vol. title	Material collected	Publication date	ISBN
Wolverine			Wolverine #1–4; Uncanny X-Men #172–173	January 2007	HC: 978-0-7851-2329-3
Wolverine			Wolverine #1–4; Uncanny X-Men #172–173	March 2009	SC: 978-0-7851-3724-5
Wolverine			Wolverine #1–4; Uncanny X-Men #172–173	June 18, 2013	
Wolverine Classic	1		Wolverine vol. 2, #1–5	April 2005	978-0-7851-1797-1
Wolverine Classic	2		Wolverine vol. 2, #6–10	September 2005	978-0-7851-1877-0
Wolverine Classic	3		Wolverine vol. 2, #11–16	May 2006	978-0-7851-2053-7
Wolverine Classic	4		Wolverine vol. 2, #17–23	September 2006	978-0-7851-2054-4
Wolverine Classic	5		Wolverine vol. 2, #24–30	September 2007	978-0-7851-2739-0
Wolverine by Larry Hama & Marc Silvestri	1		Wolverine vol. 2, #31–37; Wolverine: The Jungle Adventure; Wolverine: Bloodlust	July 9, 2013	978-0-7851-8451-5
Wolverine by Larry Hama & Marc Silvestri	2		Wolverine vol. 2, #38–46; Wolverine: Rhane of Terra	February 4, 2014	978-0-7851-8871-1
Wolverine	Weapon X Unbound		Wolverine vol. 2, #47–57	January 24, 2017	978-1-302-90388-6
Wolverine Legends	6	Marc Silvestri	Wolverine vol. 2, #31–34, 41–42, 48–50	May 2004	978-0-7851-0952-5
Wolverine	Not Dead Yet		Wolverine vol. 2, #119–122	December 1998; May 2009	SC: 978-0-7851-0704-0; HC: 978-0-7851-3766-5
Wolverine	Blood Wedding		Wolverine vol. 2, #123–132, and Wolverine: Black Rio	December 1998; May 2009	978-0-7851-8524-6; 978-0-7851-8524-6
X-Men vs. Apocalypse	1	The Twelve	Wolverine vol. 2, #146–147; Cable #73–76; Uncanny X-Men #376–377; X-Men #96–97	March 2008	978-0-7851-2263-0
X-Men vs. Apocalypse	2	Ages of Apocalypse	Wolverine vol. 2, #148; Cable #77; Uncanny X-Men #378, Annual '99; X-51 #8; X-Men #98; X-Men Unlimited #26; X-Men: The Search for Cyclops #1–4	September 2008	978-0-7851-2264-7
Wolverine	Blood Debt		Wolverine vol. 2, #150–153	July 2001	978-0-7851-0785-9
Wolverine	The Best There Is		Wolverine vol. 2, #159–161, 167–169	September 2002	978-0-7851-1007-1
The Return of Weapon X			Wolverine vol. 2, #159–176 and Annual 2000-2001	October 8, 2013	978-0-7851-8523-9
Wolverine/Deadpool	Weapon X		Wolverine vol. 2, #162–166; Deadpool #57–60	August 2002	978-0-7851-0918-1
Wolverine Legends	3	Law of the Jungle	Wolverine vol. 2, #181–186	March 2003	978-0-7851-1135-1
Wolverine by Greg Rucka	1	The Brotherhood	Wolverine (vol. 3) #1–6	February 2004	978-0-7851-1136-8
Wolverine by Greg Rucka	2	Coyote Crossing	Wolverine (vol. 3) #7–11	May 2004	978-0-7851-1137-5
Wolverine by Greg Rucka	3	Return of the Native	Wolverine (vol. 3) #12–19	October 2004	978-0-7851-1397-3
Wolverine: Enemy of the State	1		Wolverine (vol. 3) #20–25	October 2006; May 2005	SC: 978-0-7851-1492-5; HC: 978-0-7851-1815-2
Wolverine: Enemy of the State	2		Wolverine (vol. 3) #26–32	June 2006; December 2005	SC: 978-0-7851-1627-1; HC: 978-0-7851-1926-5
Wolverine: Enemy of the State Ultimate Collection			Wolverine (vol. 3)#20–32	June 2008; October 2006	SC: 978-0-7851-3301-8; HC: 978-0-7851-2206-7
House of M	World of M, Featuring Wolverine		Wolverine (vol. 3) #33–35; Black Panther vol. 4, #7; Captain America vol. 5, #10; The Pulse #10	March 2006	978-0-7851-1922-7
Decimation	Origins and Endings		Wolverine (vol. 3) #36–40	December 2006; May 2006	SC: 978-0-7851-1979-1; HC: 978-0-7851-1977-7
Blood and Sorrow			Wolverine (vol. 3) #41, 49; Giant-Size Wolverine #1; X-Men Unlimited #12	July 2007	978-0-7851-2607-2
Civil War: Wolverine			Wolverine (vol. 3) #42–48	May 2007	978-0-7851-1980-7
Evolution			Wolverine (vol. 3) #50–55	March 2008; November 2007	SC: 978-0-7851-2256-2; HC: 978-0-7851-2255-5
The Death of Wolverine			Wolverine (vol. 3) #56–61	July 2008; April 2008	SC: 978-0-7851-2612-6; HC: 978-0-7851-2611-9
Get Mystique			Wolverine (vol. 3) #62–65	August 2008	978-0-7851-2963-9
Old Man Logan			Wolverine (vol. 3) #66–72; Wolverine: Old Man Logan Giant-Size	September 2010; October 2009	SC: 978-0-7851-3172-4; HC: 978-0-7851-3159-5
Dark Wolverine	1	The Prince	Wolverine (vol. 3) #73–74 (back stories); Dark Wolverine #75–77	March 2010; November 2009	SC: 978-0-7851-3866-2; HC: 978-0-7851-3900-3
Dark Wolverine	2	My Hero	Dark Wolverine vol. 3, #78–81	March 2010	SC: 978-0-7851-3867-9; HC: 978-0-7851-3977-5
Siege: X-Men			Dark Wolverine #82-84, New Mutants (vol. 3) #11, Siege: Storming Asgard - Heroes & Villains #1	August 2010	978-0-7851-4815-9
Wolverine: The Reckoning			Dark Wolverine #85-87, Wolverine: Origins #46-50	October 2010	978-0-7851-3978-2
Punisher: Franken-Castle			Dark Wolverine #88-89, Punisher (vol. 8) #11-16, Franken-Castle #17-21, Dark Reign: The List - Punisher #1	December 2010	978-0-7851-4754-1
Daken: Dark Wolverine - Punishment			Dark Wolverine #75-89, Dark Reign: The List - Punisher #1, Wolverine: Origins #47-48, Franken-Castle #19-20, Dark Wolverine Saga #1	July 2017	978-1-302-90686-3
Daken: Dark Wolverine	1	Empire	Dark Wolverine #90, Daken: Dark Wolverine #1-4	February 2011	978-0-7851-4705-3
Wolverine Goes to Hell			Wolverine (vol. 4) #1–5	January 2011; February 2011	SC: 978-0-7851-4785-5; HC: 978-0-7851-4784-8
Wolverine Vs. The X-Men			Wolverine (vol. 4) #6–9 & 5.1	June 2011	SC: 978-0-7851-4787-9; HC: 978-0-7851-4786-2
Wolverine's Revenge			Wolverine (vol. 4) #10–16	November 2011	SC: 978-0-7851-5279-8; HC: 978-0-7851-5279-8
Wolverine	Goodbye, Chinatown		Wolverine (vol. 4) #17–20	April 2012	HC: 978-0-7851-6141-7
Wolverine	Back in Japan		Wolverine #300–304	July 2012	HC: 978-0-7851-6143-1
Wolverine	Rot		Wolverine #305–309	September 2012	HC: 978-0-7851-6145-5
Wolverine	Sabretooth Reborn		Wolverine #310–313	February 2013	HC: 978-0-7851-6325-1
Wolverine	Covenant		Wolverine #314–317	April 2013	TPB: 978-0-7851-6467-8
Wolverine Volume 1: Hunting Season			Wolverine (vol. 5) #1–6	September 2013	978-0-7851-8396-9
Wolverine Volume 2: Killable			Wolverine (vol. 5) #6–13	March 25, 2014	SC: 978-0-7851-8397-6
Wolverine Volume 2: Three Months to Die Book 1			Wolverine (vol. 6) #1-7	August 2014	
Wolverine Volume 2: Three Months to Die Book 2			Wolverine (vol. 6) #8-12, Annual #1	December 9, 2014	SC: 978-0-7851-5420-4
Death of Wolverine	Prelude: Three Months To Die		Wolverine (vol. 6) #1–12, Annual #1	April 2020	978-1-302-92283-2
Death of Wolverine	The Complete Collection		Death of Wolverine #1–4; Death of Wolverine: The Weapon X Program #1–5; Death of Wolverine: Logan Legacy #1–7; Death of Wolverine: Deadpool & Captain America #1; Death of Wolverine: Life After Logan #1	May 2018	978-1-302-91242-0
Death of Wolverine	Companion		Wolverine & the X-Men (vol. 2) #10–11; Nightcrawler (vol. 4) #7; Wolverines #1–20	March 2019	978-1-302-91610-7
Hunt for Wolverine			Hunt For Wolverine #1, Hunt For Wolverine: Weapon Lost #1-4, Hunt For Wolverine: Adamantium Agenda #1-4, Hunt For Wolverine: Claws Of A Killer #1-4, Hunt For Wolverine: Mystery In Madripoor #1-4, Where's Wolverine pages	November 2018	HC: 978-1-302-91301-4
Return of Wolverine			Return of Wolverine #1-5	April 2019	978-1-302-91198-0
Wolverine: Infinity Watch			Wolverine: Infinity Watch #1-5	September 10, 2019	978-1-302-91581-0
Wolverine by Benjamin Percy Vol 1			Wolverine (vol. 7) #1-5	December 2020	978-1-302-92182-8
Wolverine by Benjamin Percy Vol 2			Wolverine (vol. 7) #8-12	September 2021	978-1-302-92183-5
Wolverine by Benjamin Percy Vol 3			Wolverine (vol. 7) #14-19	February 2022	978-1-302-92725-7
Wolverine by Benjamin Percy Vol 4			Wolverine (vol. 7) #20-25	December 2022	978-1-302-92726-4
Wolverine by Benjamin Percy Vol 5			Wolverine (vol. 7) #26-30	June 2023	978-1-302-93297-8
Wolverine by Benjamin Percy Vol 6			Wolverine (vol. 7) #31-35	October 2023	978-1-302-94764-4
Wolverine by Benjamin Percy Vol 7			Wolverine (vol. 7) #36-40	March 2024	978-1-302-95153-5
Wolverine by Benjamin Percy Vol 8			Wolverine (vol. 7) #41-45	June 2024	978-1-302-95472-7
Wolverine by Benjamin Percy Vol 9			Wolverine (vol. 7) #46-50	August 2024	978-1-302-95473-4

== Wolverine: Origins ==
Title	Vol.	Vol. title	Material collected	Publication date	ISBN
Wolverine: Origins	1	Born in Blood	Wolverine: Origins #1–5	April 2007; November 2006	SC: 978-0-7851-2287-6; HC: 978-0-7851-2285-2
Wolverine: Origins	2	Savior	Wolverine: Origins #6–10	October 2007; March 2007	SC: 978-0-7851-2288-3; HC: 978-0-7851-2286-9
Wolverine: Origins	3	Swift and Terrible	Wolverine: Origins #11–15	November 2007; August 2007	SC: 978-0-7851-2613-3; HC: 978-0-7851-2637-9
Wolverine: Origins	4	Our War	Wolverine: Origins #16–20, Annual #1	June 2008; February 2008	SC: 978-0-7851-2614-0; HC: 978-0-7851-2638-6
Wolverine: Origins	5	Deadpool	Wolverine: Origins #21–27	December 2008; September 2008	SC: 978-0-7851-2615-7; HC: 978-0-7851-2639-3
X-Men	Original Sin		Wolverine: Origins #28–30; X-Men: Original Sin #1; X-Men: Legacy #217–218	August 2009; February 2009	SC: 978-0-7851-2956-1; HC: 978-0-7851-3038-3
Wolverine: Origins	6	Dark Reign	Wolverine: Origins #31–36	December 2009; September 2009	SC: 978-0-7851-3538-8; HC: 978-0-7851-3628-6
Wolverine: Origins	7	Romulus	Wolverine: Origins #37–40	April 2010; December 2009	SC: 978-0-7851-3539-5; HC: 978-0-7851-3629-3
Wolverine: Origins	8	Seven the Hard Way	Wolverine: Origins #41–45	September 2010; April 2010	SC: 978-0-7851-4649-0; HC: 978-0-7851-4648-3
Wolverine: Origins	9	The Reckoning	Wolverine: Origins #46–50; Dark Wolverine #85–87	October 2010	HC: 978-0-7851-3978-2

== Wolverine: First Class ==
Title	Vol. title	Material collected	Publication date	ISBN
Wolverine: First Class	The Rookie	Wolverine: First Class #1–4; The Incredible Hulk #181	October 2008	978-0-7851-3316-2
Wolverine: First Class	To Russia With Love	Wolverine: First Class #5–8; The Uncanny X-Men #139–140	February 2009	978-0-7851-3317-9
Wolverine: First Class	Wolverine by Night	Wolverine: First Class #9–12	April 2009	978-0-7851-3534-0
Wolverine: First Class	Ninjas, Gods and Divas	Wolverine: First Class #13–16; X-Men and Power Pack #1	August 2009	978-0-7851-3535-7
Wolverine: First Class	Class Actions	Wolverine: First Class #17–21	February 2010	978-0-7851-3678-1
Weapon X: First Class	Wolverine: Tales of Weapon X	Weapon X: First Class #1-3, Wolverine: First Class #1-2 And Wolverine And Power Pack #2	November 2009	

== Wolverine: Weapon X ==
Title	Material collected	Publication date	ISBN
Wolverine: Weapon X, Vol. 1: The Adamantium Men	Wolverine: Weapon X #1–5; Wolverine vol. 3, #73–74	April 2010; November 2009	SC: 978-0-7851-4111-2; HC: 978-0-7851-4017-7
Wolverine: Weapon X, Vol. 2: Insane in the Brain	Wolverine: Weapon X #6–10	July 2010; March 2010	SC: 978-0-7851-4112-9; HC: 978-0-7851-4018-4
Wolverine: Weapon X, Vol. 3: Tomorrow Dies Today	Wolverine: Weapon X #11–16; Dark Reign: The List – Wolverine	October 2010; March 2011	SC: 978-0-7851-4651-3; HC: 978-0-7851-4650-6

== Wolverine and the X-Men ==
Title	Material collected	Publication date	ISBN
Wolverine and the X-Men, Vol. 1	Wolverine and the X-Men (vol. 1) #1–4	May 2, 2012	978-0-7851-5679-6
Wolverine and the X-Men: Alpha & Omega	Wolverine & the X-Men: Alpha & Omega (vol. 1) #1–5	July 2012	978-0-7851-6400-5
Wolverine and the X-Men, Vol. 2	Wolverine and the X-Men (vol. 1) #5–8	September 5, 2012	978-0-7851-5681-9
Wolverine and the X-Men, Vol. 3	Wolverine and the X-Men (vol. 1) #9–13	October 10, 2012	978-0-7851-5999-5
Wolverine and the X-Men, Vol. 4	Wolverine and the X-Men (vol. 1) #14–18	January 8, 2013	978-0-7851-6542-2
Wolverine and the X-Men, Vol. 5	Wolverine and the X-Men (vol. 1) #19–24	July 16, 2013	978-0-7851-6577-4
Wolverine and the X-Men, Vol. 6	Wolverine and the X-Men (vol. 1) #25–29	September 24, 2013	978-0-7851-6599-6
Wolverine and the X-Men, Vol. 7	Wolverine and the X-Men (vol. 1) #30–35	October 2013	978-0-7851-6600-9
X-Men: Battle of the Atom	X-Men: Battle of the Atom (vol. 1) #1–2; All-New X-Men (vol. 1) 16–17; X-Men (vol. 4) #5–6; Uncanny X-Men (vol. 3) #12–13; Wolverine and the X-Men (vol. 1) #36–37	January 21, 2014	Hardcover: 978-0-7851-8906-0 Paperback: 978-1-84653-572-7
Wolverine and the X-Men, Vol. 8	Wolverine and the X-Men (vol. 1) #38–42; Wolverine and the X-Men Annual (vol. 1) #1	September 24, 2013	978-0-7851-6601-6
Wolverine & the X-Men by Jason Aaron Omnibus	Wolverine and the X-Men (vol. 1) #1–35 & 38–42; Wolverine and the X-Men Annual (vol. 1) #1	June 17, 2014	978-0-7851-9024-0
Wolverine and the X-Men, Volume 1: Tomorrow Never Learns	Wolverine and the X-Men (vol. 2) #1–6	November 18, 2014	Paperback: 978-0-7851-8992-3
Wolverine and the X-Men, Volume 2: Death of Wolverine	Wolverine and the X-Men (vol. 2) #7–12	February 17, 2015	Paperback: 978-0-7851-8993-0

== Wolverine: The Best There Is ==
Title	Material collected	Publication date	ISBN
Wolverine: The Best There Is: Contagion	Wolverine: The Best There Is #1-6	July 2011	
Wolverine: The Best There Is: Broken Quarantine	Wolverine: The Best There Is #7-12	July 2012	
Wolverine: The Best There Is: The Complete Series	Wolverine: The Best There Is #1-12	May 2013	

== Savage Wolverine ==
Title	Material collected	Publication date	ISBN
Savage Wolverine Vol. 1: Kill Island; Wolverine by Frank Cho: Savage Land	Savage Wolverine #1-5	August 2013	
Savage Wolverine Vol. 2: Hands on a Dead Body	Savage Wolverine #6-11	February 2014	
Savage Wolverine Vol. 3: Wrath	Savage Wolverine #12-17	July 2014	
Savage Wolverine Vol. 4: The Best There Is	Savage Wolverine #18-23	August 2015	

== Marvel Comics Presents featuring Wolverine ==
Title	Material collected	Publication date	ISBN
Marvel Comics Presents: Wolverine, Vol. 1	Marvel Comics Presents #1–10	July 2005	978-0-7851-1826-8
Marvel Comics Presents: Wolverine, Vol. 2	Marvel Comics Presents #39–50	January 2006	978-0-7851-1883-1
Marvel Comics Presents: Wolverine, Vol. 3	Marvel Comics Presents #51–61	June 2006	978-0-7851-2065-0
Marvel Comics Presents: Wolverine, Vol. 4	Marvel Comics Presents #62–71	December 2006	978-0-7851-2066-7
Wolverine and Ghost Rider in Acts of Vengeance	Marvel Comics Presents #64-70	1993	0-7851-0022-9
Wolverine: Weapon X	Marvel Comics Presents #72–84	March 2009; March 2007	SC: 978-0-7851-3726-9; HC: 978-0-7851-2327-9
Wolverine: Blood Hungry	Marvel Comics Presents #85–92	December 1993	978-0-7851-0003-4
Wolverine: Prehistory	Marvel Comics Presents #93–98; Wolverine (2003) #32; Logan: Path of the Warlord, Shadow Society; Wolverine: Agent of Atlas #1-3; First X-Men #1-5; Wolverine: Hunger; Wolverine (1988) -#1; Before The Fantastic Four: Ben Grimm & Logan #1-3; Wolverine/Cable; Wolverine: the Amazing Immortal Man & Other Bloody Tales, Wolverine (2010) #1000	February 2017	978-1-302-90386-2
Wolverine: Typhoid's Kiss	Marvel Comics Presents #109–116	May 1994	978-0-7851-0056-0
Wolverine Vs. the Marvel Universe	Marvel Comics Presents #117–122; Captain America Annual #8; Daredevil (1964) #249; Spider-Man Vs. Wolverine, Incredible Hulk (1968) #340, Wolverine (1988) #134, Wolverine Vs. Thor #1-3, Marvel Universe Vs. Wolverine #1-4	March 2017	978-1-302-90465-4

== Other ==
Title	Material collected	Publication date	ISBN
Wolverine Legends, Vol. 1: Hulk/Wolverine	Hulk/Wolverine #1-4	March 2003	
Wolverine Legends, Vol. 2: Meltdown	Havok and Wolverine: Meltdown #1–4	March 2003	978-0-7851-1048-4
Wolverine Legends, Vol. 3: Law of the Jungle	Wolverine (Vol 2) #181-186	March 2003	
Wolverine Legends, Vol. 4: Xisle	Wolverine: Xisle #1–5	July 2003	978-0-7851-1221-1
Wolverine Legends, Vol. 5: Snikt	Wolverine: Snikt! #1–5	January 2004	
Wolverine: Soultaker	Wolverine: Soultaker #1–5	August 2005	978-0-7851-1505-2
Wolverine: Origin	Origin #1–6	March 2006; October 2006	SC: 978-0-7851-3727-6; HC: 978-0-7851-2328-6
Wolverine: Origin II	Origin II #1–5	August 2014; April 2015	SC: 978-0-7851-9032-5; HC: 978-0-7851-8481-2
Wolverine: The End	Wolverine: The End #1–6	May 2007	978-0-7851-1349-2
Wolverine: Dangerous Games	Wolverine: Deathsong; Wolverine: Dangerous Games; Wolverine: Firebreak; Wolverine: Killing Made Simple;	December 2008	978-0-7851-3471-8
X-Men: Manifest Destiny	Wolverine: Manifest Destiny #1-4; X-Men Manifest Destiny: Nightcrawler #1, and X-Men: Manifest Destiny #1-5	September 2009	978-0-7851-3951-5
X-Men: Wolverine/Gambit	Wolverine/Gambit: Victims #1–4	June 2002; November 2009	SC: 978-0-7851-0896-2; HC: 978-0-7851-3802-0
Kitty Pryde and Wolverine	Kitty Pryde and Wolverine #1–6	June 2008	0-7851-3089-6
Wolverine and Jubilee	Wolverine and Jubilee #1-4	June 29, 2011	HC: ISBN 0-7851-5775-1; SC: ISBN 978-0-7851-5775-5
Wolverine: The Amazing Immortal Man and Other Bloody Tales	Wolverine #900, #1000; Wolverine Annual (2007) #2; Rampaging Wolverine #1; Wolverine: The Amazing Immortal Man & Other Bloody Tales, Under The Boardwalk, Wendigo!, Carnibrawl, Savage, Mr. X, Dust From Above, Debt Of Death; Material From Wolverine: Switchback	June 2018	
Wolverine: Flies to a Spider	Wolverine: Chop Shop; Wolverine: Switchback; Wolverine Holiday Special: Flies to a Spider; Wolverine: Dead Man's Hand	August 2009	978-0-7851-3569-2
Wolverine Noir	Wolverine Noir #1–4	May 2010; November 2009	SC: 978-0-7851-3547-0; HC: 978-0-7851-3945-4
Elektra & Wolverine: The Redeemer	Elektra & Wolverine: The Redeemer #1-3	May 2002	
Hulk/Wolverine: 6 Hours	Hulk/Wolverine: 6 Hours #1–4; The Incredible Hulk #181	May 2003	978-0-7851-1157-3
Wolverine and Captain America	Wolverine and Captain America #1-4, Wolverine #124	2004	
Spider-Man Legends Vol 4: Spider-Man and Wolverine	Spider-Man and Wolverine #1-4	March 2004	
Astonishing Spider-Man & Wolverine	Astonishing Spider-Man & Wolverine #1-6	November 2012 August 2011	SC: HC:
Wolverine/Black Cat: Claws	Wolverine/Black Cat: Claws #1–3	February 2010; February 2007	SC: 978-0-7851-4285-0; HC: 978-0-7851-1850-3
Wolverine/Black Cat: Claws 2	Wolverine/Black Cat: Claws 2 #1–3; Killraven (2001) #1	May 2012 November 2011	SC: HC:
Wolverine/Hercules: Myths, Monsters & Mutants	Wolverine/Hercules: Myths, Monsters & Mutants #1-4, material from Marvel Treasury Edition #26	August 2011	
Wolverine & Nick Fury	Wolverine/Nick Fury: The Scorpio Connection, Wolverine: Bloody Choices And Wolverine & Nick Fury: Scorpio Rising	March 2012	
Wolverine and Power Pack	Wolverine and Power Pack #1-4	2009	
Marvel Platinum: The Definitive Wolverine	Origin #2; Marvel Comics Presents #79; Incredible Hulk #181; Uncanny X-Men #109; Wolverine #1–4; Spider-Man vs. Wolverine #1; X-Men #25; Wolverine #75, #145	April 2009	978-1-84653-409-6
Wolverine: Logan	Logan #1–3	April 2009; September 2008	SC: 978-0-7851-3414-5; HC: 978-0-7851-3425-1
Wolverine: Season One	Wolverine: Season One OGN	June 2013	
Wolverine vs. Punisher	Punisher War Journal #6-7, Wolverine/Punisher: Damaging Evidence #1-3, Punisher War Zone #19, Wolverine/Punisher: Revelation #1-4, Punisher #16-17, Wolverine #186, Wolverine/Punisher #1-5, Astonishing Tales: Wolverine/Punisher #1-6	April 2017	
Wolverine: The Long Night	Wolverine: The Long Night Adaptation #1-5	July 2019	
Wolverine: The Daughter of Wolverine	Material from Marvel Comics Presents (2019) #1-9	March 2020	
Wolverine: Black, White and Blood	Wolverine: Black, White and Blood #1-4	August 2021	
Wolverine: Patch	Wolverine: Patch #1-5	November 2022	978-1-302-93206-0
Wolverine: Madripoor Knights	Wolverine: Madripoor Knights #1-5	January 2025	
Wolverine: Deep Cut	Wolverine: Deep Cut #1-4	April 2025	
Wolverine: Revenge	Wolverine: Revenge #1-5	June 2025	
Deadpool and Wolverine: WWIII	Deadpool and Wolverine: WWIII #1-3	October 2024	
Venom War: Wolverine/Deadpool	Venom War: Wolverine #1-3, Venom War: Deadpool #1-3, Venom War: Carnage #1-3	April 2025	
