= Old Man Quill =

American comic book series

Publication information
- Publisher: Marvel Comics
- Schedule: Monthly
- Publication date: February 6 – December 4, 2019
- No. of issues: 12
- Main character(s): Old Man Quill / Star-Lord; Ashley Barton / Spider-Bitch

Creative team
- Created by: Old Man Logan created by Mark Millar
- Written by: Ethan Sacks
- Artist(s): Robert Gill; Ibraim Roberson

Collected editions
- Nobody's Fault But My Own: ISBN 1-3029-1669-6
- Go Your Own Way: ISBN 1-3029-1670-X

Old Man Quill is a 12-issue American comic book limited series published by Marvel Comics, written by Ethan Sacks and drawn by Robert Gill and Ibraim Roberson, as a spin-off of Old Man Logan (2016–2018) and Dead Man Logan (2018–2019). The series follows the elderly Peter Quill as he returns to a post-apocalyptic supervillain-ruled Earth years following the deaths of the Guardians of the Galaxy, as he seeks to prevent the planet from being consumed by Galactus. The series is set across two six-issue volumes: Nobody's Fault But My Own and Go Your Own Way.

The series received a generally positive critical reception, and was followed by Avengers of the Wastelands.

== Plot summary ==
=== Nobody's Fault But My Own ===
Following the conclusion of Old Man Logan (2016–2018) and Dead Man Logan (2018–2019), an elderly Peter Quill, former Star-Lord and current Emperor of Spartax, seemingly returns to Earth with the Guardians of the Galaxy on a mysterious quest through the Wastelands, seeking out a hidden weapon in the Baxter Building in order to prevent Galactus from consuming Earth. Over his journey, he unwittingly assists Ashley Barton / Spider-Bitch to regain power after she returned to her reality after Spider-Geddon to find seven years to have passed, oblivious to her being a supervillain.

=== Go Your Own Way ===
After finding the Ultimate Nullifier to have been destroyed, Quill realises he has been hallucinating all of the other Guardians over his quest, who were killed by Galactus. After bypassing Doctor Doom, who believes Quill came for him, and Spider-Bitch, who assumed Doom has come for her, Quill eventually defeats Galactus himself by shooting him in the head with the Time Stone, lobotomising him, before forming a new incarnation of the Guardians of the Galaxy to travel the galaxy and take down the Church of Galactus.

== Reception ==
=== Nobody's Fault But My Own ===
Issue #	Publication date	Critic rating	Critic reviews	Ref.
1	February 2019	7.2/10	12	
2	February 2019	7.1/10	3	
3	March 2019	7.5/10	3	
4	April 2019	7.2/10	2	
5	May 2019	6.7/10	3	
6	June 2019	4.0/10	1	
Overall		6.6/10	116	

=== Go Your Own Way ===
Issue #	Publication date	Critic rating	Critic reviews	Ref.
7	July 2019	6.0/10	1	
8	August 2019	5.2/10	2	
9	September 2019	6.0/10	2	
10	October 2019	4.0/10	1	
11	November 2019	4.0/10	2	
12	December 2019	5.3/10	2	
Overall		5.1/10	95	

== Collected editions ==
Title	Material collected	Format	Publication date	ISBN
Volume 1: Nobody's Fault But My Own	Old Man Quill #1–6	Trade paperback	August 6, 2019	978-1-302-91669-5
Volume 2: Go Your Own Way	Old Man Quill #7–12	Trade paperback	February 4, 2020	978-1-302-91669-5
