= Razor Fist =

Marvel Comics fictional character

- The Douglas Scott incarnation of Razor Fist as depicted in Daredevil (vol. 2) #102 (January 2008). Art by Michael Lark.

Publication information
- Publisher: Marvel Comics
- First appearance: William Young: Master of Kung Fu #29 (June 1975); William Scott: Master of Kung Fu #105 (October 1981); Douglas Scott: Master of Kung Fu #105 (October 1981)
- Created by: William Young: Doug Moench; Paul Gulacy; William Scott: Doug Moench; Gene Day; Douglas Scott: Doug Moench; Gene Day

In-story information
- Alter ego: William Young; Douglas Scott; William Scott
- Species: Human
- Team affiliations: Assassins Guild
- Abilities: Extensively trained hand to hand combatant and martial artist Peak-level physical attributes Wields steel blades

Razor Fist is the name of three different supervillains appearing in American comic books published by Marvel Comics. The original Razor Fist was killed off in the comic books many years ago; he first appeared in Master of Kung Fu #29 (June 1975).The next two characters to take the title were brothers. The current Razor Fist is the only surviving brother.

Florian Munteanu portrays Razor Fist in the Marvel Cinematic Universe film Shang-Chi and the Legend of the Ten Rings.

== Publication history ==
The first Razor Fist is William Young, an assassin, bodyguard, and enforcer employed by Carlton Velcro, who surgically replaced his hands with steel blades. Razor Fist battles Shang-Chi, during which he is accidentally shot to death by Velcro's guards. The character appears in Master of Kung Fu #29 (June 1975). Doctor Doom later creates two robot duplicates of Razor Fist, which he pits against Shang-Chi, in Master of Kung Fu #59–60 (December 1977 - January 1978).

In Master of Kung Fu #105 (October 1981), William and Douglas Scott, brothers, are servants of Carlton Velcro who each lost a hand in a car accident. They both become known as Razor Fist and pretend to be only one person. Each brother lost one hand in a car accident, which were subsequently replaced by long knife-like stabbing weapons by Velcro. After Velcro accidentally kills William, Douglas is defeated and captured by Shang-Chi and Pavane. In West Coast Avengers (vol. 2) #11 (August 1986), Douglas loses his other hand and replaces both his missing hands with blades. In Marvel Comics Presents #2–4 (September - October 1988), Razor Fist begins working for the crime lord Roche in Madripoor and is assigned to kill Wolverine. With the assistance of Sapphire Styx, he overpowers Wolverine and knocks him off a cliff.

In New Avengers #35 (December 2007), the Hood recruits Razor Fist, among other villains, into his gang to take advantage of the split in the superhero community caused by the Superhuman Registration Act. In The Deadly Hands of Kung Fu (vol. 2) #1–4 (July - October 2014), under the employ of White Dragon, Razor Fist murders undercover MI-6 agent Leiko Wu, the lover of his leader's rival Triad clan leader Skull-Crusher, in London's Chinatown. Razor Fist and some of White Dragon's men attempt to attack Shang-Chi, who was in London investigating Leiko's death but are thwarted by the Daughters of the Dragon. They flee the fight when Shang-Chi recognizes the tattoo of the Mao Shan Pai, a powerful black magic, on one of White Dragon's men. After Midnight Sun, Shang-Chi's brother and the true mastermind behind White Dragon, accidentally resurrects Leiko with the Mao Shan Pai, Razor Fist attempts to kill her a second time. However, he is beaten by Leiko, who rips his blades from his arms. Before she can kill Razor Fist, Leiko is stopped by Shang-Chi.

An alternate universe version of Douglas Scott / Razor Fist from Earth-13116 appears in Master of Kung Fu (vol. 2). This version is a student of the Ten Rings school and enforcer of Emperor Zheng Zu who wields the Mortal Blade, a technique that makes his hands razor sharp.

== Powers and abilities ==
Each Razor Fist has no known superhuman powers. However, each Razor Fist's physical strength, speed, stamina, agility, and endurance are honed to the peak of human conditioning. The first Razor Fist's hands were both surgically replaced with steel blades, while the former two Razor Fists initially had only one hand replaced with a steel blade. The last remaining Razor Fist eventually had his other hand replaced by a similar blade as well.

Each Razor Fist is highly skilled in multiple forms of combat, with extensive training in hand-to-hand combat and martial arts.

== In other media ==
- An original incarnation of Razor Fist appears in Shang-Chi and the Legend of the Ten Rings, portrayed by Florian Munteanu. This version is Matthias, a Romanian member of the Ten Rings and the adopted son of its leader Wenwu.
- The Douglas Scott incarnation of Razor Fist appears in Marvel Avengers Alliance. He is killed as part of a ritual sacrifice and later found by a group of heroes.
