= Femme Fatales (comics) =

Fictional comic book group

- The Femme Fatales as depicted on the cover of The Amazing Spider-Man #340 (October 1990). Art by Mike Machlan.

Publication information
- Publisher: Marvel Comics
- First appearance: The Amazing Spider-Man #340 (Oct. 1990)
- Created by: David Michelinie; Erik Larsen

In-story information
- Member(s): Knockout; Bloodlust; Mindblast; Whiplash

The Femme Fatales are a group of female supervillains appearing in American comic books published by Marvel Comics. They are often depicted as antagonists to the superhero characters Spider-Man and Captain America.

== Fictional team history ==
The Femme Fatales are a group of mutants who work as mercenaries for hire. Group members Bloodlust and Whiplash have a history of working together prior to joining the Femme Fatales, as members of a previous group called the Band of Baddies. They were hired by fellow villain Chameleon in the disguise of Dr. Turner to threaten an ambassador. Spider-Man intervenes and saves the ambassador, making him an enemy of the Femme Fatales.

The Femme Fatales later receive an invitation to join Superia and her organization of female criminals, the Femizons. They accept and battle Captain America and Paladin in the process.

The Femme Fatales splinter and disband sometime later. Bloodlust and Whiplash are seen attending the A.I.M. Weapons Expo.

Bloodlust loses her powers after the events of "Decimation". Mindblast retains her powers and briefly allies with Hammerhead during the "Civil War" storyline.

During the "Hunt for Wolverine" storyline, the Femme Fatales are joined by Viper and Sapphire Styx, with Whiplash changing her name to Snake Whip. The Fatales ambush Kitty Pryde, Rogue, Domino, Jubilee, and Psylocke in Madripoor. Sapphire Styx uses her lifeforce-draining ability on Psylocke, but this backfires and Styx is destroyed, enabling Psylocke to create a new body for herself. Viper escapes, while the other Femme Fatales are locked up.

== Members ==
Member	First appearance	Description
Bloodlust	Marvel Comics Presents #49 (May 1990)	Beatta Dubiel is a former mutant who possessed superhuman senses, speed, agility, durability, a healing factor, and powerful claws and fangs. She was one of the many mutants who were depowered after Decimation, though she continues to be a trained assassin without her powers.
Knockout	The Amazing Spider-Man #340 (Oct. 1990)	Elizabeth Rawson is the original leader of the Femme Fatales, and has superhuman strength and endurance. Cybernetic parts of her costume suggest that her already advanced strength is augmented when needed and also provides body armor.
Mindblast	The Amazing Spider-Man #340 (Oct. 1990)	Danielle Forte is a mutant with powerful telekinetic abilities which she usually fashions into "tractor beams". She was one of the few mutants to retain their powers after Decimation. At some point later, Mindblast gained the use of telepathy strong enough to combat Psylocke of the X-Men.
Sapphire Styx	Marvel Comics Presents #1 (Sept. 1988)	Sapphire Styx is a mutant who has the ability to absorb the life force of others. She was recruited into the Femme Fatales when Viper became their leader and relocated them to Madripoor. Styx was killed when Psylocke and a soul sliver of Wolverine overloaded her.
Snake Whip	Marvel Comics Presents #49 (May 1990)	Leeann Foreman is a mutant with unrevealed abilities. She previously went by the codename Whiplash, though changed it when Viper took over leadership. She is equipped with three built-in retractable whips that release from her wrists.
Viper	Captain America #110 (Feb. 1969)	Ophelia Sarkissian is the current leader of the Femme Fatales.

== Other versions ==
An alternate universe version of the Femme Fatales appears in All-New Ultimates, consisting of Bloodlust, Knockout, Mindblast, and Whiplash.

== In other media ==
- In Marvel: Ultimate Alliance, Femme Fatales is a team bonus for any four-person combination of Storm, Elektra, Spider-Woman, Invisible Woman, and Ms. Marvel.
- In Marvel: Future Fight, Femme Fatales is a team bonus consisting of Elektra, Black Cat, and Black Widow.

== See also ==
- List of Marvel Comics characters
