= Steve McNiven =

Canadian comic book artist

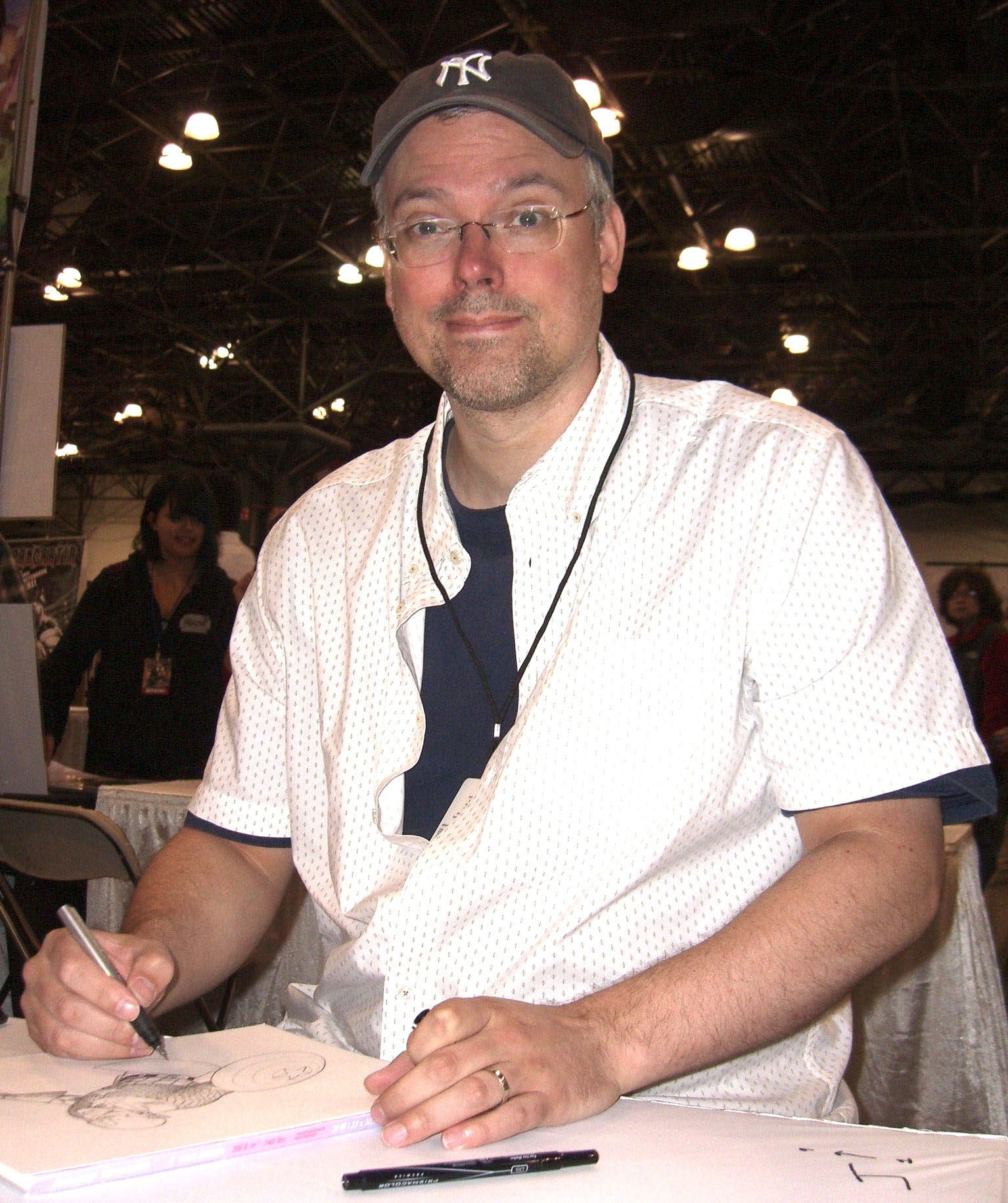
- McNiven at the October 10, 2010 New York Comic Con in Manhattan, New York
- Born: Steven McNiven
- Area: Penciller
- Notable works: Meridian; Ultimate Secret; New Avengers; Civil War "Old Man Logan"; Marvel Knights 4

Steven McNiven is a Canadian comic book artist. He first gained prominence on CrossGen's Meridian, before moving onto books such as Ultimate Secret, Marvel Knights 4, New Avengers, and Civil War, illustrating storylines such as "Old Man Logan."

== Early life ==
Steven McNiven is a native of Halifax, Nova Scotia.

== Career ==
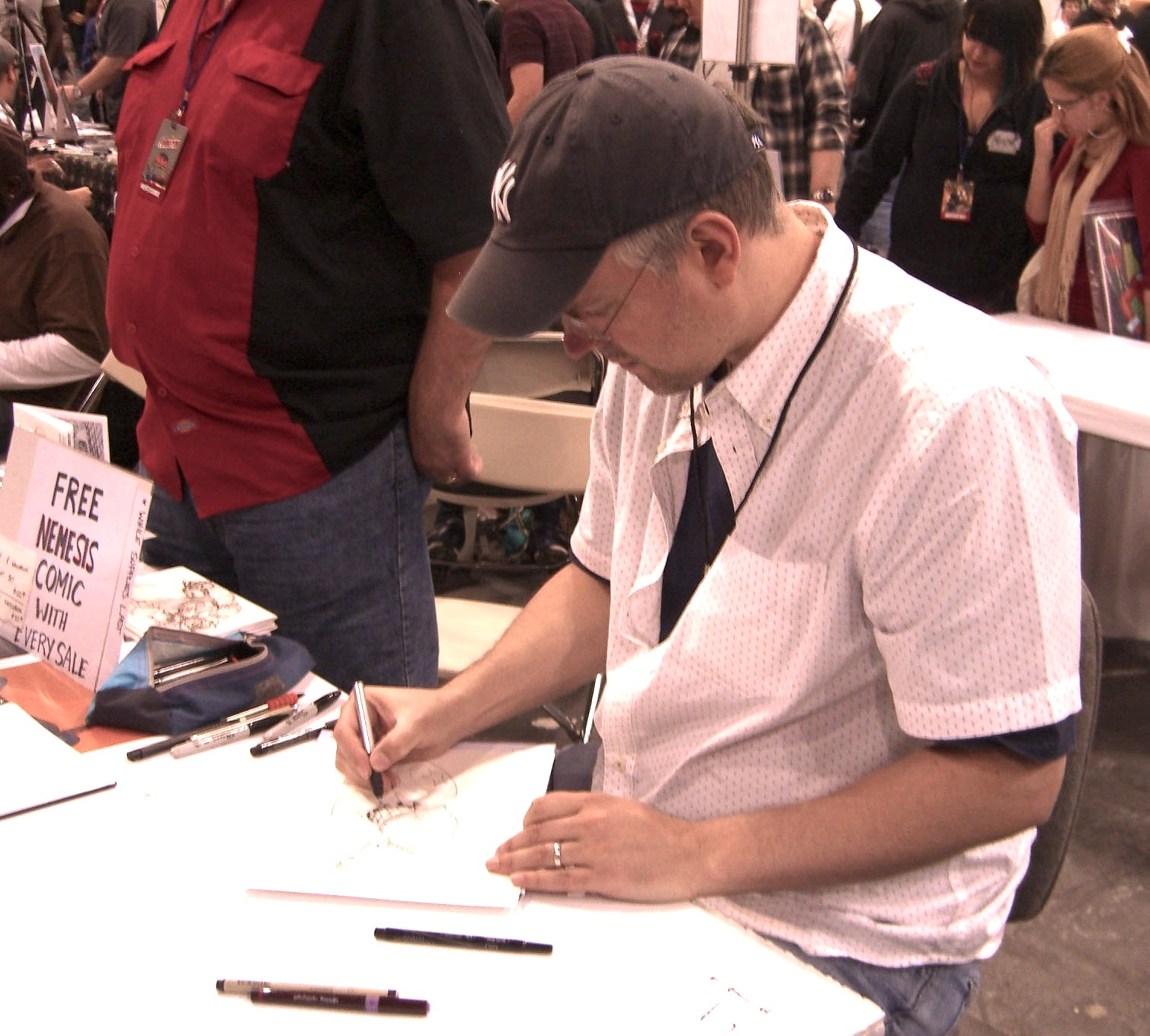
McNiven sketching at the New York Comic Con in Manhattan, October 10, 2010

McNiven first came into prominence after he took over as a penciller of CrossGen's Meridian title following the departure of Josh Middleton.

He subsequently gained worked for Marvel Comics as the penciller of Marvel Knights 4, Ultimate Secret and New Avengers.

In August 2005 he was named one of Marvel's "Young Guns", a group of artists that, according to Marvel Editor-in-Chief Joe Quesada, have the qualities that make "a future superstar penciller". Other "Young Guns" include Olivier Coipel, David Finch, Trevor Hairsine, Adi Granov and Jim Cheung.

McNiven was the penciller of the Marvel mini-series Civil War working with Mark Millar. He followed this by provided the art for the Wolverine storyline "Old Man Logan" and the Icon Comics mini-series Nemesis, both with Millar.

In 2011 Marvel relaunched a new volume of Captain America, with McNiven as artist. In 2012 he provided the Marvel NOW! poster for New York Comic Con. the art which feature The Avengers in an iconic New York setting. In 2013 he drew the Guardians of the Galaxy ongoing series with writer Brian Michael Bendis. McNiven drew the Uncanny Avengers from issue 14 to issue 17. McNiven was the artist for Marvel Comics' Limited series Death of Wolverine. In 2015 McNiven redesign costume of Black Bolt, Human Torch during Charles Soule's run on Uncanny Inhumans. He also penciled issue 0 to 4.

In 2017 McNiven penciled issues #1 and 10 of the Marvel miniseries Secret Empire. The series was a commercial success, with issues #0 and 1 being the third best-selling comic books of April and May, respectively.

In 2018 he worked on the miniseries Return of Wolverine with writer Charles Soule, as a follow-up to Death of Wolverine and Hunt For Wolverine.

At the 2024 New York Comic Con, it was announced that McNiven would reunite with Soule on a three-issue miniseries entitled Daredevil: Cold Day in Hell. The series debuted in April 2025 and ended in August 2025.

== Bibliography ==
=== Interior work ===
==== CrossGen ====
- Meridian #6-7, 9-12, 14-17, 19-21, 23-26, 29-30, 33-36 (with Barbara Kesel, 2001–03)
- Mystic #7 (with Ron Marz, 2000)
- Archard's Agents: Deadly Dare (with Chuck Dixon, one-shot, 2004)
- Sigil #6 (with Barbara Kesel, 2000)

==== Marvel ====
Marvel Knights 4 #2 cover art

- The Amazing Spider-Man #546-548: "Brand New Day" (with Dan Slott, 2008)
- AvX: VS #2: "Captain America vs. Gambit" (script and art, 2012)
- Avengers Finale (with Brian Michael Bendis, among other artists, one-shot, 2005)
- Captain America, vol 6, #1-5: "American Dreamers" (with Ed Brubaker, 2011)
- Captain America: Peggy Carter, Agent of S.H.I.E.L.D. (with various artists, 2014)
- Civil War #1-7 (with Mark Millar, 2006–07)
- Daredevil: Cold Day in Hell #1-3 (With Charles Soule, 2025)
- Death of Wolverine #1-4 (with Charles Soule, 2014)
- Marvel Knights 4 #1-7 (with Roberto Aguirre-Sacasa, 2004)
- Guardians of the Galaxy, vol. 3, #0.1-3 (with Brian Michael Bendis, 2013)
- Monsters Unleashed #1, (with Cullen Bunn, 2017)
- Nemesis, miniseries, #1-4 (with Mark Millar, Icon, 2010–11)
- Secret Empire #1, #10, (with Nick Spencer, 2017)
- New Avengers Vol. 1 (with Brian Michael Bendis):
  - "The Sentry" (in #7-10, 2005)
  - "The Collective" (in #16, 2006)
  - "Dark Reign" (with Billy Tan and various artists, in #50, 2009)
- New Avengers Vol. 2 #16 (with Brian Michael Bendis, Marvel, 2011)
- Return of Wolverine #1, #5 (with Charles Soul, Marvel, 2018)
- Ultimate Secret #1-2 (with Warren Ellis, Marvel, 2005)
- Uncanny Avengers #14-17 (with Rick Remender, 2013-2014)
- Uncanny Inhumans #0-4 (with Charles Soule, 2015–16)
- Wolverine #66-72 (with Mark Millar, Marvel, 2008–09)
- Wolverine: Old Man Logan Giant-Size (with Mark Millar, Marvel, 2009)

=== Cover work ===
- Marvel Knights 4 #8–12, 15, 17, 19 (Marvel, 2004–2005)
- District X #1-6, 8 (Marvel, 2004–2005)
- Spider-Man Unlimited #3 (Marvel, 2004)
- New Avengers #1, 17–18 (Marvel, 2005–2006)
- Powerless #6 (Marvel, 2005)
- What If... Jessica Jones Had Joined the Avengers? (Marvel, 2005)
- Ultimate Secret #3–4 (Marvel, 2005)
- Marvel Knights Spider-Man #13–18 (Marvel, 2005)
- Witchblade #95 (Top Cow, 2006)
- Civil War Files #1 (Marvel, 2006)
- Daredevil #82 (Marvel, 2006)
- Red Sonja #8, 15 (Dynamite, 2006)
- Battlestar Galactica #0 (Dynamite, 2006)
- The Dark Tower: The Gunslinger Born #4 (Marvel, 2007)
- The Order #1 (Marvel, 2007)
- Kick-Ass #1 (Icon, 2008)
- Wonderlost #2 (Image, 2008)
- The Last Defenders #1 (Marvel, 2008)
- Secret Invasion #1–4 (Marvel, 2008)
- Marvel Comics Presents #9 (Marvel, 2008)
- The Marvels Project #1–8 (Marvel, 2009–2010)
- Dark Avengers/Uncanny X-Men: Exodus #1 (Marvel, 2009)
- Wolverine vol. 4 #1 (Marvel, 2010)
- Superior #2 (Icon, 2011)
- Ultimate Comics: Spider-Man #154, 158 (Marvel, 2011)
- Fear Itself #1–7 (Marvel, 2011)
- The Amazing Spider-Man Annual #38 (Marvel, 2011)
- Deadpool Annual #1 (Marvel, 2011)
- Incredible Hulks Annual #1 (Marvel, 2011)
- The Avengers vol. 4 #24.1 (Marvel, 2012)
- Avengers Assemble #9 (Marvel, 2012)
- Avenging Spider-Man #6 (Marvel, 2012)
- A+X #1 (variant cover, Marvel, 2012)
- Wolverine vol. 1, #305 (Marvel, 2012)
- Infinity #1 (variant cover only, Marvel, 2013)
- Captain America #25 (variant cover only, Marvel, 2014)
- Civil War II #1 (variant cover, Marvel, 2014)
- SHIELD #1 (variant cover, Marvel, 2014)
- Wolverine vol. 6, #8–12 (Marvel, 2014)
- Legendary Star-Lord #1 (Marvel, 2014)
- Original Sin #1 (variant cover, Marvel, 2014)
- Uncanny Inhumans #1 (variant cover, Marvel, 2015)
- Empress #1 (variant cover, Icon, 2016)
- Return of Wolverine #2–3 (Marvel, 2018)
- Old Man Hawkeye #1 (variant cover, Marvel, 2018)
- Nemesis: Reloaded #1–5 (Image, 2023)
