= Hunt for Wolverine =

2018 comic book storyline

- Cover art for Hunt for Wolverine #1

Publication information
- Publisher: Marvel Comics
- Publication date: June 2018
- Main character(s): Wolverine; Daredevil; Iron Man; Sabretooth; Kitty Pryde; Soteira

Creative team
- Written by: Charles Soule
- Penciller: David Marquez

"Hunt for Wolverine" is a 2018 comic book storyline published by Marvel Comics, starring the character Wolverine. The storyline is the follow-up to the Death of Wolverine event, and is continued with Return of Wolverine.

== Background ==
The storyline detailed Wolverine's return from the dead following the "Death of Wolverine" storyline and how the X-Men would cope with this discovery. The lead-up included a "Where Is Wolverine?" mini-story at the end of different comic issues.

According to Marvel, each of the stories was designed to have a specific theme to it: Weapon Lost would have a noir theme, The Adamantium Agenda would be an action-adventure, Claws of a Killer aimed for a horror sensibility, and Mystery in Madripoor for a dark romance motif. Following the storyline, Marvel would launch the Return of Wolverine miniseries, which was followed by a new Wolverine series.

== Plot ==
=== Where is Wolverine? ===
Wolverine acquires the Space Gem after killing the Frost Giant Snarr, who was targeting it on Loki's behalf. Meanwhile, the time-displaced Jean Grey discovered the adamantium shell in Wolverine's tomb has been broken open and is empty. Keeping a low profile, Wolverine unsuccessfully attempts to rekindle his relationship with his old friends.

Wolverine also is attacked by minions of Ultron in the wilds of Canada. Easily dispatching them using the Space Gem's teleportation abilities, he is met by Loki. After losing an eye in the confrontation with Wolverine, Loki pleads unsuccessfully for the Space Gem. Wolverine later hides the Space Gem in a safehouse in Madripoor.

=== Hunt for Wolverine ===
The Reavers locate Wolverine's shrine and discover it empty; the X-Men arrive and defeat the Reavers. Kitty Pryde notices his burial shroud entangled in the nearby trees and discovers that Wolverine's body is no longer interred, and rallies the X-Men and his other close associates into finding him. Lady Deathstrike vows to hunt down Wolverine after she is notified via Reavers' intel of the empty state of the adamantium statue. Meanwhile, in an unknown location, Wolverine, clad entirely in black, is being commanded by a figure shrouded in shadows.

==== Weapon Lost ====
The X-Men have enlisted Daredevil into looking into the disappearance of Wolverine's body. While moving through the rooftops of New York City, Daredevil runs into Nur and persuades him to help. The next person Daredevil recruits is Misty Knight, who knows an information broker who can help them. The trail leads them to Cypher, who agrees to help them find Wolverine.

The Ranger Outpost Nine is attacked by a man with claws, and Cypher picks up the distress signal. Arriving in Saskatchewan, Daredevil, Knight, and Nur investigate the area while Cypher remains on the Skycharger. They find a dead men but no sign of a woman. Cypher steps out of the Skycharger to translate the man's phone.

Daredevil discovers that the Wolverine-like culprit is Albert, a robot double of Wolverine created by the Reavers. Daredevil kicks Albert off the roof, and Knight destroys his cloak but he wounds her. After being tripped by Daredevil, Albert grabs him by the neck and starts to ask what he did with Elsie-Dee. The group shuts him down and leaves a tip on where to find him for the Canadian authorities. While the group is flying back to New York, a bomb goes off nearby.

Knight protects them from the explosion, and the heroes evacuate the burning building. Nur discovers that the security guard worked for a group called Soteira, so they head to one of their offices in Chicago, where Daredevil's radar detects the people inside purging their records. In the Skycharger, Cypher deciphers the information - involving Wolverine being interviewed by Soteira. Daredevil calls Kitty to let her know of his findings.

==== The Adamantium Agenda ====
Iron Man assembles Jessica Jones, Luke Cage, and Spider-Man, who hear that the genetic material of a hero is going on sale at the black market and go undercover to investigate the auction, which takes place in a submarine. They find the subject of the auction is the genetic material of Danielle Cage, much to the surprise and anger of Luke and Jessica.

The masked attendees had hoped that the DNA would be from an actual hero. As the seller claims that Danielle will one day inherit her parents' powers, a masked Tony Stark wins the auction at $30,000. Stark meets with the seller in a room for the transaction, which is crashed by Mister Sinister - seeking to reclaim genetic material of Wolverine that was stolen from him. As Iron Man works to keep Sinister from killing the seller, he is assisted by one of the disguised auction attendees who turns out to be Laura Kinney (X-23/Wolverine).

Iron Man orders Spider-Man and Jessica Jones to contain Mister Sinister. After Sinister escapes, the submarine starts to sink. Iron Man raises the submarine to the surface of the ocean, allowing everyone on it to be evacuated. When being interrogated, the seller Declan Fay states that Sinister is putting together a database of DNA, though he does not know whose DNA it is and directs them to the Kerguelen Islands. There, Iron Man's group discovers that Mister Sinister has collected the genetic make-up of every person on Earth.

Iron Man objects to Laura wanting to destroy the genetic make-up until Spider-Man discovers that no mutant DNA is included. Just then, the group is attacked by more armed guards; they find a room filled with dead personnel, Jessica states that Mister Sinister would never kill his own people and that someone else is behind this while Iron Man discovers a digital mutant database. When Spider-Man suggests they destroy the databases, Sinister arrives and admits to Iron Man that a Killteam stole his work. When Laura asks if he has Wolverine's body, Sinister states that he does not. Iron Man has no choice but to destroy the database.

==== Claws of a Killer ====
Daken learns from Lady Deathstrike about what the Reavers have informed her as Sabretooth states the rumors that Wolverine may be alive. Four days prior in Maybelle, the Soteira Killteam Nine investigates the dead population. When the three arrive in Maybelle, Daken finds members of Soteira Killteam Nine there but is attacked and bitten by Maybelle's residents, who have been revived as zombies.

As Daken regains consciousness, he hears Soitera Killteam Nine reporting that they have taken him captive. Sabretooth and Deathstrike take refuge in a garage, while Daken flees from the Killteam. Daken reunites with Sabretooth and Lady Deathstrike and suspects that a green glowing device previously activated by Wolverine is the cause of the zombie outbreak. While fighting past the zombies and the soldiers, Lady Deathstrike discovers that one of the soldiers is her late father Lord Dark Wind who stabs her in the left shoulder. Daken is impaled through the heart by Lord Dark Wind, killing him. Lady Deathstrike and Sabretooth arrive at the building where the device is and destroy it. The next day, a Soteira group finds Daken's body and claims it.

==== Mystery in Madripoor ====
Kitty Pryde gathers Jubilee, Psylocke, Rogue, and Storm as they start to look for Wolverine's body. They suspect that Magneto excavated it, so they fly to Madripoor with the aid of Domino. Magneto agrees to speak to them without his helmet so that Psylocke can verify what he has to say. Unbeknownst to Kitty's group, they are being watched by Mindblast. At the Princess' Bar, Kitty is ambushed by the Femme Fatales. Rogue and Storm are taken captive.

Kitty shoots down Jubilee's suggestion to send an S.O.S. to the X-Mansion, as all of their transmissions are being monitored. Jubilee then comes up with a plan for them to hide in plain sight. Arriving at the casino Wheelers and Dealers, the trio see Bloodlust with a man, who Kitty Pryde abducts. He is a high roller and mathematician named Stenya Ubacowits who was hired to help in the flight trajectory of a satellite, which he agrees to take them to. Sapphire Styx sees Wolverine sitting near Psylocke as he plans to dish out the proper punishment on her.

Domino, Kitty, and Jubilee reach a secure location with Ubacowits as their captive. Meanwhile, Viper is contacted by a representative of Soteira, who was displeased that the launch was delayed. While reluctantly taking the representative's suggestion, Viper and Snake Whip check up on Sapphire Styx, who claims that Wolverine is present even though Styx is the only one who can see him. Knockout and Mindblast are ambushed by Kitty and Jubilee. When Domino and Ubacowits arrive at the launch site, Bloodlust appears and stabs Ubacowits. As Snake Whip recovers, she starts to see Wolverine as well.

Psylocke finds a soul sliver of Wolverine which leads to her overpowering Sapphire Styx from within. As Magneto is still recovering, he is unable to keep the rocket containing Rogue and Storm from launching. While Kitty Pryde phases into the rocket and frees Rogue and Storm, Psylocke joins the battle against the Femme Fatales. While Magneto denies any knowledge of taking Wolverine's body, he works to destroy the launch site and purge Madripoor of Viper's criminal empire. Snake Whip confesses that Soteira had hired them and Viper to find Wolverine.

=== Dead Ends ===
Tony Stark and Daredevil arrive at the X-Mansion, and compare notes with Kitty, who notes the connection to Soteira. Thanks to Daredevil's senses, Tony and Kitty find out that kinetic weapons are falling to Earth. Iron Man, Firestar and Storm head up to investigate while Daredevil aids in the mansion's evacuation. While Firestar, Storm, and Iron Man use their attacks to stop the three projectiles, the fourth gets by them as Iron Man works to intercept before it reaches the X-Mansion as Kitty works to phase the ground so that it would hit the magma layer of the Earth instead. Just then, a bespectacled bald-headed man appears and states that he needed a distraction so that he can set up ten corpses on their property; a hologram of a person identifying herself as Persephone thanks the assembled heroes for saving the world many times and states that she has Wolverine who is doing good work while also being behind Soteira. Persephone states that the copy of Mister Sinister's work contains the future's mutants. Before disappearing, she advises them to stop looking or the ten bodies before them are just the beginning. The strange man then collapses, dead. In Persephone's lair, tethered by energy ropes and suspended by his arms and legs before her, Wolverine reacts angrily to her and extracts his claws, which are shown to be glowing red hot. Persephone tells him that he need not worry as this will all be over soon.

== Collected issues ==
Title	Material collected	Publication date	ISBN
Hunt for Wolverine	Hunt For Wolverine #1, Hunt For Wolverine: Weapon Lost #1-4, Hunt For Wolverine: Adamantium Agenda #1-4, Hunt For Wolverine: Claws Of A Killer #1-4, Hunt For Wolverine: Mystery In Madripoor #1-4 and Where is Wolverine? stinger pages	November 2018	978-1302913014
Hunt for Wolverine: Mystery in Madripoor	Hunt for Wolverine #1, and Hunt for Wolverine: Mystery in Madripoor #1-4	December 2018	978-1302913052
Hunt for Wolverine: Adamantium Agenda	Hunt for Wolverine #1, and Hunt for Wolverine: Adamantium Agenda #1-4	December 2018	978-1302913038
Hunt for Wolverine: Claws of a Killer	Hunt For Wolverine #1, and Hunt For Wolverine: Claws Of A Killer #1-4	December 2018	978-1302913045
Hunt for Wolverine: Weapon Lost	Hunt For Wolverine #1, and Hunt For Wolverine: Weapon Lost #1-4	December 2018	978-130291302-1
