= Archie Corrigan =

Publication information
- Publisher: Marvel Comics
- First appearance: Wolverine vol. 2 #4 (Feb. 1989)
- Created by: Chris Claremont

In-story information
- Species: Human
- Partnerships: Patch

Archie Corrigan is a fictional character appearing in American comic books published by Marvel Comics.

== Fictional character biography ==
Archie Corrigan is a friend of Patch and is a pilot. He owns and operates South Seas Skyways, of which he is the sole employee. He lives in Madripoor.

Archie helps Patch out on several encounters with the criminal elements of Madripoor. Early on, he works with Patch in a confrontation with Madripoor's ruler, Prince Baran. Soon joined by Karma, they battle the super-powered enforcement duo of Bloodscream and Roughhouse. The three heroes proceed to save each other's lives multiple times.

Archie's father dies, leaving him thirty dollars - one dollar for every year of aggravation. His brother Burt, a mentally unstable man, gains the majority of the inheritance. Archie's aunt Ruth calls a competency hearing for Burt. Archie asks Patch to come with him as moral support. Archie, Patch, and Jessica Drew fly from Madripoor to San Francisco for the hearing and battle Ba'al-Hadad, a demonic Anunnaki who manifests vampire-like creatures to pursue them. After Ba'al-Hadad is killed, Burt moves on with his life; he is later seen breaking the bank at a casino.

An assassination attempt leads to Archie almost being killed. He is spared only because the Yakuza value his piloting skills. Archie works closely with underworld figure Tyger Tiger to expose a conspiracy targeting Logan and his allies. This falls apart when the Yakuza head is betrayed and killed by an operative from within.

General Coy and Prince Baran lead an attack on the Princess Bar, killing Archie and many of Wolverine's friends. Other fatalities are Rick O'Donnell and Rose Wu, a shapeshifting employee of Landau, Luckman, and Lake.

== Powers and abilities ==
Although he had no actual super powers, Archie was a good fighter, pilot, and smuggler. His piloting skills were widely renowned in the criminal underworld.
