= Marvel Knights 4 =

Comic book series

Publication information
- Publisher: Marvel Comics
- Schedule: Monthly
- Publication date: April 2004 – August 2006
- No. of issues: 30
- Main character: Fantastic Four

Creative team
- Written by: Roberto Aguirre-Sacasa
- Penciller(s): Steve McNiven; Jim Muniz; Valentine DeLandro; Mizuki Sakakibara; Clay Mann

Marvel Knights 4 is the name of a comic book series featuring the Marvel Comics superhero team, the Fantastic Four. The series was launched as part of the company's Marvel Knights imprint, and ran for 30 issues (Apr. 2004 – Aug. 2006). All issues in the series were written by playwright Roberto Aguirre-Sacasa, and presented stories that focused less upon science fiction themes than typical Fantastic Four tales.

== Publication history ==
In 2004, Marvel Comics' editor-in-chief Joe Quesada announced that playwright Roberto Aguirre-Sacasa would become the new writer for Fantastic Four, one of the company's flagship titles. Soon thereafter, Marvel announced that Aguirre-Sacasa would be given a new Fantastic Four title to be published under the "Marvel Knights" imprint, and that Mark Waid would continue on the primary series (along with artist Mike Wieringo). Aguirre-Sacasa's series, entitled Marvel Knights 4, ran for 30 issues until its cancellation in 2006.

== Collected editions ==
Title	Material collected	Publication date	ISBN
Marvel Knights Fantastic Four, Vol. 1: Wolf at the Door	Marvel Knights 4 #1–7	September 2004	978-0785114710
Marvel Knights Fantastic Four, Vol. 2: The Stuff of Nightmares	Marvel Knights 4 #8–12	January 2005	978-0785114727
Marvel Knights Fantastic Four, Vol. 3: Divine Time	Marvel Knights 4 #13–18	July 2005	978-0785116783
Marvel Knights Fantastic Four, Vol. 4: Impossible Things Happen Every Day	Marvel Knights 4 #19–24	January 2006	978-0785118084
Marvel Knights Fantastic Four, Vol. 5: The Resurrection of Nicholas Scratch	Marvel Knights 4 #25–30	September 2006	978-0785119593

== See also ==
- Fantastic Four comic book
