= Sapphire Styx =

Publication information
- Publisher: Marvel Comics
- First appearance: Marvel Comics Presents #1 (September 1988)
- Created by: Chris Claremont; John Buscema; Klaus Janson

In-story information
- Species: Human Mutant
- Team affiliations: Femme Fatales
- Abilities: Lifeforce absorption

Sapphire Styx is a supervillain appearing in American comic books published by Marvel Comics.

== Publication history ==
Sapphire Styx debuted in Marvel Comics Presents #1 (September 1988), created by Chris Claremont, John Buscema and Klaus Janson.

== Fictional character biography ==
At the Princess Bar on Madripoor, Sapphire Styx is first seen witnessing Wolverine defeating Roche's gang. She poses as a hostage, with Wolverine scaring away her tormentor. Before she can kiss him, Wolverine mentions the name Dave Chapel, causing Styx to pull out a gun. After putting away her gun, Styx bothers Wolverine until he leaves the bar. Later, Styx finds Wolverine lying on the street and offers him her place to stay for the night. When Wolverine refuses, Styx drains his life force. Styx grows bored with Roche's group torturing Wolverine and leaves with them when Wolverine falls unconscious.

Roche sends Styx after O'Donnell, owner of the Princess Bar. However, she is confronted and shot by Tyger Tiger. After defeating the Inquisitor, Tyger Tiger battles Styx, who attempts to drain her life force. Tyger Tiger breaks free and uses the Inquisitor's heating iron to burn Styx's face. Tyger Tiger collapses while Styx flees with the Inquisitor.

During the "Hunt for Wolverine" storyline, Sapphire Styx appears as a member of the Femme Fatales when they attack Psylocke. Styx captures Psylocke, stating that her spirit could keep her revitalized for years, only to learn that Psylocke has died. Kitty Pryde, Domino, and Jubilee catch up to Styx and learn that Psylocke has tricked her. In the psychic plane, Psylocke confronts Styx, whose body shatters.

== Powers and abilities ==
Sapphire Styx can drain the life force of anyone she comes in contact with. The more life force she absorbs, the stronger she becomes.

Styx is also an expert at armed combat, but rarely uses a gun in battle.
