= Death of Wolverine =

2014 comic book storyline

- Cover to Death of Wolverine #1 (Nov 2014). Art by Steve McNiven and Justin Ponsor.
- Publisher: Marvel Comics
- Publication date: September – October 2014
- Genre: Superhero; Crossover
- Main character: Wolverine

Creative team
- Writer: Charles Soule
- Penciller: Steve McNiven
- Inker: Jay Leisten
- Colorist: Justin Ponsor

"Death of Wolverine" is a 2014 comic book storyline published by Marvel Comics. The story has grown from both volume 5 (Marvel Now!) and volume 6 (All-New Marvel Now!) of the Wolverine main series, and also continued with "Hunt for Wolverine" and "Return of Wolverine".

== Premise ==
The start of the storyline (Wolverine vol. 5 #1–6) details how a virus from the Microverse caused Wolverine's healing factor to burn out and stop working, allowing enemies from his past to attempt to finally kill him.

The main series is followed by a number of aftermath mini-series that chronicle Wolverine's friends and family as they come to terms with the death of Logan. This series forms a lead-in to the weekly Wolverines title beginning in January 2015.

== Plot ==
A Microverse virus disables Wolverine's healing factor, rendering him mortal. Mister Fantastic offers to work on reactivating Wolverine's healing factor, but Wolverine accepts the vulnerability.

Wolverine learns that there is a bounty on his head and resolves to find the contractor. His search initially leads him to Viper, who directs him to "Lord Ogun"; Ogun is actually Abraham Cornelius, the founder of the Weapon X program. Wolverine travels to Paradise, where he finds Cornelius trying to replicate what he did to Wolverine, but he cannot replicate Wolverine's healing factor. Wolverine reveals to him that he no longer has a healing factor for the doctor to copy. Cornelius is enraged and sets his latest experiment on Wolverine. Wolverine defeats Cornelius' experiment and Cornelius, in desperation, tries to escape by activating the adamantium bonding process on the three other subjects. Wolverine slashes the adamantium container before the bonding process can begin, but is immersed in molten adamantium when the container shatters.

Cornelius is fatally injured during the conflict. As he dies, Cornelius claims rhetorically that Wolverine's life was nothing but violence. Wolverine reflects on a life of violence, love, friendship, and mentorship in equal measures, imagining it to be "Enough." He dies as well, encased in the hardening adamantium. Storm takes charge of the X-Men and the team is heartbroken over Wolverine's death.

== Aftermath ==
=== Death of Wolverine: Deadpool and Captain America ===
An elderly Steve Rogers and Deadpool are shown collecting anything which has Wolverine's DNA on it and destroying it, so no one would be able to clone the Wolverine. They infiltrate an A.I.M. base, where they steal a blade with Wolverine's blood on it. As they leave, Steve goes inside, leaving the blade with Deadpool and saying that Deadpool knows what to do with it. Deadpool then takes the blade to Butler's incubator, which could regrow an entire being. Deadpool scrapes the blood from the knife into a petri dish but hesitates before putting it in the machine, wondering whether he should resurrect Wolverine or let him rest and decides that he needs to think it over.

Cyclops is shown entering a bar and beating a couple of men who were insulting one man's son for being a mutant. After beating them, he raises a glass of beer as a toast to Wolverine.

=== Nightcrawler ===
Nightcrawler and Colossus travel to Mariko Yashida's grave, where they take out Wolverine's sword and slam it into the grave as a sign of them being together. The men guarding the grave take it as an insult and attack them. Nightcrawler says, "First we honor his love, then we honor what he did best," and fight the guards.

Hisako Ichiki (Armor) is shown in the Danger Room fighting villains when Hellion interrupts and tries to console her, saying that Wolverine would become a part of her armor and he would always be with her.

=== Spider-Man and the X-Men ===
As one of his last requests, Wolverine arranged for Spider-Man to become a member of the Jean Grey School for Higher Learning's staff, wanting Spider-Man to investigate a suspected double agent. Despite the initial hostility he faced from the rest of the team, Spider-Man soon exposed a plan by Mister Sinister to acquire genetic samples from the X-Men and create a clone army. Storm even noted after Sinister's defeat that Spider-Man's unconventional attitude made him more like Wolverine than she had acknowledged. This is shown in Spider-Man and the X-Men.

=== X-23 ===
A team formed by test subjects at Paradise awakes after Wolverine's life force has depleted and escapes from Paradise. They find that Cornelius experimented on them, giving them super powers. But since they were test subjects, they were designed to die quickly. In an attempt to stay alive, they go after X-23, Daken, Sabretooth, Mystique, Lady Deathstrike, and Elixir to obtain or copy their healing factors. The story is largely shown in the fourth volume of X-23.

== Titles involved ==
| Title | Issue(s) |
Lead up/Preludes
| Wolverine Volume Five | #1–13 |
| Wolverine Volume Six | #1–12 |
| Wolverine Volume Six Annual | #1 |
Core miniseries
| Death of Wolverine | #1–4 |
Aftermath Tie-ins
| Death of Wolverine: Deadpool & Captain America | #1 |
| Death of Wolverine: Life After Logan | #1 |
| Death of Wolverine: The Logan Legacy | #1–7 |
| Death of Wolverine: The Weapon X Program | #1–5 |
| Nightcrawler | #7 |
| Spider-Man and the X-Men | #1-6 |
| Storm | #4-5 |
| Wolverine and the X-Men | #10–11 |
| Wolverines | #1-20 |

== Reception ==
Core miniseries
| Issue | IGN rating |
|---|---|
| 1 | 8.6/10 |
| 2 | 8.3/10 |
| 3 | 8.2/10 |
| 4 | 7.1/10 |

Death of Wolverine received positive reviews. Matthew Mueller of comicbook.com gave the fourth issue 4 out of 5 stars. IGN gave the story and the overall graphic novel a positive review giving it a 6.0 rating out of 10 with a verdict, "Death of Wolverine is not a perfect story. The spartan approach to storytelling hurts as well as helps the book at times. But between Soule's clever take on writing Wolverine and the amazing work produced by the art team, this is a story every Wolverine fan should experience. The hardcover version only enhances the presentation quality". Eric Diaz of the Nerdist gave it a positive review rating it 3 out of 5 burritos (burritos being the equivalent to stars). However, Stew Shearer of The Escapist gave it 2 out of 5 stars stating that "Death of Wolverine is a lousy send-off for a character who is easily one of Marvel's most iconic. Setting aside the fact that this is most certainly all temporary, the book does little to draw the reader in or keep them interested."

== Collected editions ==
| Title | Material collected | Published date | ISBN |
|---|---|---|---|
| Death of Wolverine Prelude: Three Months to Die | Wolverine (vol. 6) #1-12, Wolverine Annual #1 | July 2020 | 978-1302922832 |
| Death of Wolverine | Death of Wolverine #1-4 | January 2015 | 978-0785193517 |
| Death of Wolverine: The Weapon X Program | Death Of Wolverine: The Weapon X Program #1-5, Death of Wolverine: Life After Logan #1 | March 2015 | 978-0785192602 |
| Death of Wolverine: The Logan Legacy | Death of Wolverine: The Logan Legacy #1-7 | March 2015 | 978-0785192596 |
| Death of Wolverine: The Complete Collection | Death Of Wolverine #1-4, Death Of Wolverine: The Weapon X Program #1-5, Death Of Wolverine: The Logan Legacy #1-7, Death Of Wolverine: Deadpool & Captain America #1, Death Of Wolverine: Life After Logan #1 | May 2018 | 978-1302912420 |
| Wolverine & the X-Men Vol. 2: Death of Wolverine | Wolverine & the X-Men (vol. 2) #7-12 | February 2015 | 978-0785189930 |
| Death of Wolverine Companion | Nightcrawler #7, Wolverine & the X-Men (vol. 2) #10-11, Wolverines #1-20 | March 2019 | 978-1302916107 |

== In other media ==
The Death of Wolverine served as one of the two "Wolverine" storylines alongside Old Man Logan as the main sources of inspiration for the 2017 film Logan. While featuring an original premise, the death of the titular character was taken from The Death of Wolverine.
