= Dead Man Logan =

American comic book series

Publication information
- Publisher: Marvel Comics
- Schedule: Monthly
- Publication date: November 28, 2018 – December 1, 2021
- No. of issues: 12
- Main character: Old Man Logan

Creative team
- Created by: Old Man Logan created by Mark Millar
- Written by: Ed Brisson
- Artist: Mike Henderson

Collected editions
- Sins of the Father: ISBN 1-8465-3979-X
- Welcome Back, Logan: ISBN 1-3029-1466-9
- The Complete Collection: ISBN 1-3029-2539-3

Dead Man Logan is a 12-issue American comic book limited series published by Marvel Comics, written by Ed Brisson and illustrated by Mike Henderson, as a continuation of the ongoing series Old Man Logan (2015–2018). The series follows the dying Old Man Logan as he finally returns to the Wastelands after being isekaied to Earth-616 for years following Secret Wars. The series is set across two six-issue volumes: Sins of the Father and Welcome Back, Logan.

The series received a generally positive critical reception, and was followed by Avengers of the Wasteland.

== Plot summary ==
=== Sins of the Father ===
Following the conclusion of Old Man Logan (2015–2018), the dying Old Man Logan (dying of adamantium poisoning) decides to murder Mysterio ahead of returning to his home dimension to ensure Earth-616 will not meet the same fate as his future. However, in doing so, Logan unwittingly leads Miss Sinister and Neo-HYDRA to learn of the future mutant massacre from his original future, and trying to get Mysterio to set it in motion.

=== Welcome Back, Logan ===
The dying Old Man Logan returns to the armageddon-like Wastelands he left behind to five seven years to have passed in that dimension. As he reunites with the autistic inbred young adult Hulk Bruce Banner Jr., Logan finds himself pursued by a variety of villains eager to settle old scores now that he is vulnerable, in particular a league of Sabretooths.

== Reception ==
=== Sins of the Father ===
Issue #	Publication date	Critic rating	Critic reviews	Ref.
1	November 2018	7.3/10	10	
2	December 2018	8.2/10	4	
3	January 2019	7.3/10	5	
4	February 2019	8.4/10	4	
5	March 2019	7.8/10	4	
6	April 2019	8.4/10	5	
Overall		7.9/10	125	

=== Welcome Back, Logan ===
Issue #	Publication date	Critic rating	Critic reviews	Ref.
1	May 2019	8.1/10	5	
2	June 2019	8.1/10	4	
3	July 2019	7.6/10	4	
4	August 2019	7.7/10	4	
5	September 2019	7.8/10	4	
6	October 2019	8.6/10	6	
Overall		8.0/10	110	

== Collected editions ==
Title	Material collected	Format	Publication date	ISBN
Volume 1: Sins of the Father	Dead Man Logan #1–6	Trade paperback	June 19, 2019	978-1-302-91465-3
Volume 2: Welcome Back, Logan	Dead Man Logan #7–12	Trade paperback	December 18, 2019	978-1-302-91466-0
Dead Man Logan: The Complete Collection	Dead Man Logan #1–12	Trade paperback	November 10, 2020	978-1-302-92539-0
