= Return of Wolverine =

2018 comic book miniseries

Publication information
- Publisher: Marvel Comics
- Format: Limited series
- Publication date: September 2018 – February 2019
- Main character(s): Wolverine; Soteira; X-Men

Creative team
- Written by: Charles Soule
- Penciller(s): Steve McNiven & Declan Shalvey

Return of Wolverine is a 2018 comic book miniseries published by Marvel Comics. This miniseries is a continuation on the events that transpired in the "Death of Wolverine" and "Hunt for Wolverine" storylines, and explains how Wolverine returned from the dead.

== Premise ==
As a follow-up to the "Hunt for Wolverine" storyline, Marvel released this five-part mini-series to precede a new "Wolverine" comic series.

== Plot ==
The story begins with Wolverine in agony, kneeling in a pool of blood as his claws glow red hot. He is surrounded by dead soldiers as well as a living caged Smilodon in the background. He gives water to Bernard Delacroix, a wounded scientist for Soteira brought into their service to work on their de-extinction project. He is shocked to see Wolverine alive and begs to be released from the will of Soteira by having Wolverine kill him with his claws. Suddenly, a grenade rolls into the laboratory, killing Bernard and freeing the Smilodon, who attacks Wolverine. Wolverine rides a motorcycle down to a work camp on the shore, which is soon engulfed in fire. He is attacked by a clone of Omega Red, who shoots out the front tire of Wolverine's motorcycle. Thrown from the wreck and hitting his head on a rock, he eventually loses consciousness and dreams about Soteira's leader Persephone. Wolverine is awakened by a worker from the camp's canteen named Ana, who recognizes him as a famous superhero and pleads for his help to rescue her son Perren, who has been ordered into custody by one of the soldiers. As Ana staples his wound, Wolverine theorizes that Ana's son may be used as an incubator of sorts, as she tells him that he was injected with something from their labs before it was destroyed. As Wolverine still has fragmented memories, even unable to recognize his own name, Ana recalls a story she heard about him where a man in machine gun armor attacked a hospital as Wolverine selflessly fought to stop him, without regard to his own safety. This memory causes Wolverine to remember his name.

Wolverine and Ana flee in a boat as they are attacked by Omega Red. Ana fires a harpoon gun through Omega Red's head, hurling him off the boat. Wolverine takes on an opponent who has the same claws as Daken until the fight causes rips in his outfit enough to expose his tattoos. As they fight, Wolverine has a vision of a tattooed Daken in a cell and sees a scarred Wolverine ordering to be let out, smashing his head against the bars of his cell door. As his ranting "out" becomes more intense, Wolverine's claws begin to glow red hot and he uses them to ignite the fuel from the outboard motor's fuel line and immolate Daken. Wolverine nearly slashes Ana, who pleads for him to stop. He has a vision of holding the key to the scarred Wolverine's cell, but regains his composure and refuses to unlock the door. With an engine lost in the fight, Soteira's boat has sped out of range, but Wolverine still has their scent. Ana thanks Logan for his selflessness with a kiss before they soon arrive at Soteira's island-city.

At the X-Mansion, Kitty Pryde informs Storm that Jean Grey used Cerebro to find Wolverine. Kitty Pryde, Storm, Jean Grey, Iceman, and Nightcrawler arrive to look for Wolverine, but are attacked by the police and a group of civilians. Wolverine finds an injured civilian who claims that the X-Men must be associated with Soteira. Wolverine has a vision of his X-Force persona telling him that he can help out due to his knowledge of their powers and weaknesses. Wolverine then recalls that under duress, Nightcrawler resorts to predictable patterns. Anticipating his next reappearance, Wolverine retracts his claws and punches Nightcrawler in the face. Attempting to attack Jean, he is suddenly encased in ice by Iceman, who pleads with him to calm down. Wolverine breaks free and cuts Iceman in half.

Following his battle with the X-Men, Wolverine wakes up strapped in a hospital bed to learn from Ana that Kitty called a retreat due to Iceman's injuries and Soteira's threat to release the berserker Wolverine on the city's population. She releases Wolverine's bonds and tells him that he killed about a third of the city's populace before collapsing from exhaustion. Zagreus enters from the shadows and fires a restraining device through Wolverine's chest that pins him to the wall while Persephone explains her entire world view, her disappointment with human society. She reveals that Ana and Perron are in fact mind-controlled undead entities under her will as is everyone in the island-city, which she is using as a test for her ultimate goal. Persephone reveals that she is a mutant with the ability to resurrect the dead while imbuing them with her own personality and can create mindless zombies as well as drones that are fully articulate enough to even fool the senses of Wolverine, depending upon her level of concentration. Ana collapses when Persephone releases her control and has Zagreus escort Wolverine to a launch pad where she invites him to her lair so that he may decide for himself to kill her or allow her to carry out her plans for world domination.

Arriving at Persephone's space station, Wolverine is met by her holographic projection. She gives him a guided tour of the facility, once again inviting him to join her in her plans to replace all dead end jobs with zombies. In a flashback, she is shown raising Wolverine out of his grave and taking control of his psyche. She claims however that at some point, his reactivated healing-factor nullified her mind control, thus setting the events seen in the de-extinction labs in motion. He refuses to participate in her schemes and she responds by flooding the room with gas, causing his skin to blister painfully. He uses his claws to break the glass observation window, ejecting him into the vacuum of space. He climbs the outer hull and reenters by cutting open an airlock. Back inside, he introduces himself to staff member Phil, who explains Persephone's entire plan to use orbiting satellites to attack the Earth with her zombie rays. Wolverine then runs amok throughout the station, cutting down all of Persephone's guards that stand in his way. He has visions of several memories of himself, each offering tactical advice for the fight at hand, including the berserker who orders him to release him from his cell lest he die in his losing battle with Zagreus. Bloodied and nearly defeated, Wolverine reaches up to unlock all of the cell doors at once, leaving only the berserker still incarcerated. With the bulk of his memories returned to him, he then easily slays Zagreus. Reaching the power core of the station, Persephone pleads with Wolverine to cease his destruction, threatening to haunt him forever. Unimpressed with the notion of yet one more ghost in his life, Wolverine uses his claws to destroy the nuclear reactor, killing Persephone. Sometime later in New York City, Wolverine arrives at the X-Mansion to reunite with the X-Men.
