= Old Man Logan =

Comic book character

- Artwork for the variant cover of Old Man Logan vol. 2, #50 (October 2018); Art by Mike Deodato Jr.

Publication information
- Publisher: Marvel Comics
- First appearance: Wolverine (Vol 3) #66 (June 2008)
- Created by: Mark Millar; Steve McNiven; (based upon Wolverine by Roy Thomas, Len Wein, and John Romita, Sr.)

In-story information
- Alter ego: James "Logan" Howlett
- Place of origin: Earth-807128
- Team affiliations: X-Men; Fantastic Force; Weapon X-Force
- Abilities: Superhuman senses, strength, speed, durability, reflexes, stamina; Regeneration and slowed aging; Adamantium-laced skeleton; Retractable bone-claws; Skilled martial artist and master hand-to-hand combatant
Old Man Logan
Publication information
- Schedule: vol. 1–3: Monthly
- Format: Ongoing series
- Main character: Wolverine
Creative team
- Written by: (vol. 1); Mark Millar (vol. 2); Brian Michael Bendis (vol. 3-5); Jeff Lemire (vol. 6-12); Ed Brisson
- Penciller(s): (vol. 1); Steve McNiven (vol. 2); Andrea Sorrentino (vol. 3); Andrea Sorrentino
Collected editions
- Wolverine: Old Man Logan: ISBN 0-7851-3159-0

Old Man Logan is an alternative version of the superhero Wolverine appearing in American comic books published by Marvel Comics. This character is an aged version of Wolverine set in an alternate future universe in which the supervillains overthrew the superheroes. Created by writer Mark Millar and artist Steve McNiven, the character first appeared in a storyline of the same name, which ran in Wolverine (Vol 3) #66–72 (June 2008 – June 2009) and which concluded in Wolverine Giant-Size Old Man Logan #1 (November 2009).

After the 2014 "Death of Wolverine" storyline, Laura Kinney took the Wolverine mantle but an Old Man Logan from the similar alternate universe was brought in to serve as an X-Man, and featured in his own ongoing series.

Old Man Logan was one of the inspirations for the 2017 film Logan, starring Hugh Jackman as the title character. The character later made a cameo appearance as Old Man Logan in the 2024 Marvel Cinematic Universe film Deadpool & Wolverine.

== Publication history ==
Old Man Logan debuted as a character in Mark Millar's run on Fantastic Four, which featured characters who are heavily implied to be the aged Wolverine and Bruce Banner Jr. as an adult. Wolverine: Old Man Logan started as an eight-issue storyline from the third volume of Wolverine ongoing series by writer Mark Millar and artist Steve McNiven, published by Marvel Comics in June 2008. The series ran through Wolverine (volume 3) #66–72 (June 2008 – June 2009) and ended in Wolverine Giant-Size Old Man Logan #1 on September 9, 2009.

Old Man Logan debuted in his solo series during the 2015 "Secret Wars" storyline, written by Brian Michael Bendis with art by Andrea Sorrentino. This story is continued in an ongoing series with the same name beginning in January 2016, written by Jeff Lemire with Sorrentino returning as artist.

== Fictional character biography ==
=== Original story ===
The United States and the world of Earth-807128 has been conquered and divided among supervillains, with territories belonging to the Abomination (later conquered by the Hulk), Magneto (later conquered by a new Kingpin), Doctor Doom, and the Red Skull, who has named himself president of the United States. Superheroes have been wiped out of existence, with the few survivors in hiding. Logan lives with his wife Maureen and young children Scotty and Jade on a barren plot of land in Sacramento, California, now part of the territory known as Hulkland. Needing money to pay rent to his landlords the Hulk Gang (the incestuous hillbilly grandchildren of the Hulk and his first cousin She-Hulk), Logan accepts a job from a blind Clint Barton to help him travel east to the capital of New Babylon and deliver a secret package (which Logan assumes to be drugs).

Logan and Barton encounter several diversions on their journey. They rescue Barton's estranged daughter Ashley (who seems to be an aspiring Spider-Girl) from the clutches of the new Kingpin. However, she then murders Kingpin and reveals her intention to seize his territory of Hammer Falls (formerly Las Vegas) herself as the new Kingpin and "Spider-Bitch" before attempting to kill her father. Logan rescues him and the pair escape, as Spider-Bitch sends her forces after them.

Throughout the story, it is reiterated that the "Wolverine" persona died the day the villains attacked and that since then, Logan has refused to use his claws. Flashbacks reveal that on the night the attack happened, a group of 40 supervillains attacked the X-Mansion. Unable to locate his teammates, Logan slaughtered the attackers to ensure the safety of the mutant children. As the last "attacker" Bullseye was killed, Logan realized that the entire assault was an illusion created by Mysterio and his perceived enemies were actually his fellow X-Men. This destroyed Wolverine emotionally and mentally and he fled the mansion and wandered away to a train track in shock and shame. Though he made a subsequent suicide attempt by allowing a freight train to run him over, Logan could not actually kill himself, but had effectively killed "Wolverine".

When they arrive at the capital, Hawkeye delivers his package to an underground resistance group hoping to begin a new team like the Avengers. The package contains super-soldier serum, enough to form an army, but Barton's clients expose themselves as undercover S.H.I.E.L.D. agents. They heavily injure Logan and kill Barton. Logan's body heals and he awakens in Red Skull's trophy room amongst the armaments and costumes of fallen superheroes. Without using his claws, he kills Red Skull's men and engages Red Skull himself, eventually decapitating him with Captain America's shield. He grabs a briefcase of money (their intended reward for the delivery) and uses pieces of Iron Man's armor to fly back home. Upon arriving, Logan discovers that the Hulk Gang murdered his family and left the bodies unburied in his absence. His neighbor Abraham Donovan states that Logan's family was killed when the Hulk Gang got tired of waiting for their payment. This results in Logan finally unleashing his claws.

Logan seeks out and slaughters the Hulk's grandchildren Beau, Bobbie-Jo, Charlie, Elrod, Eustace, Luke, Otis, Rufus, and Woody before encountering Old Man Banner himself who displays monstrous strength, even in his human form. It is implied that the gamma poisoning in his body had begun to deteriorate his sanity in his old age. Banner reveals that while the murder of Logan's family was intended as a message to others, he really just wanted to get Logan angry enough to fight him because he had gotten bored with being a "super-villain landlord" like the others. In his Hulk form, Banner easily defeats Logan and then consumes him. Logan recuperates within Banner's stomach and bursts out, killing the Hulk. Afterward, he discovers a baby Hulk named Bruce Banner Jr. A month later, Logan and his neighbors hold a small memorial for Logan's family. With nothing left of his old home, Logan then says he plans to defeat all the new world villains and bring peace to the land—with himself and Bruce Banner Jr. being the first members of a new group of superheroes—before riding off into the sunset.

After a fight with the Ghost Riders, Old Man Logan finds that Pappy Banner's head was placed on a gamma-powered robot made from adamantium by Tinkerer. He uses it in his revenge on Old Man Logan. Before Old Man Logan can be finished off by Pappy Banner, he is suddenly attacked by Bruce Banner Jr. who separates Pappy Banner's head from the adamantium armor. Rather than kill the head, Old Man Logan buries it and plants a tree over it so that its roots can slowly dig into his skull.

==== Fantastic Four ====
Some time later, Old Man Logan and the now adult Bruce Banner Jr. are featured during a scene when the new Defenders, led by an older Susan Storm, travel back in time to use cosmic energy to restore their dying Earth. Now calling himself the Hooded Man, Old Man Logan accompanies Gaia back to his original timeline in order to repopulate the now desolate Earth and keep her from going insane from the lack of inhabitants. He is later seen gardening with Gaia, who is now pregnant with his child.

=== Earth-21923 version ===
Old Man Logan

Publication information
- Publisher: Marvel Comics
- First appearance: Old Man Logan #1 (July 2015)
- Created by: Brian Michael Bendis; Andrea Sorrentino; (based upon the original Wolverine by Len Wein, John Romita, Sr., and Herb Trimpe); (based upon the original Old Man Logan by Mark Millar and Steve McNiven)

In-story information
- Alter ego: James "Logan" Howlett
- Place of origin: Earth-21923
- Team affiliations: X-Men
- Abilities: Superhuman senses, strength, speed, durability, reflexes, stamina; Regeneration and slowed aging; Adamantium-laced skeleton; Retractable bone-claws; Skilled martial artist and master hand-to-hand combatant

The history of this Old Man Logan is the same as the one on Earth-807128. When the multiverse was destroyed and Battleworld was created, a different version from an altered universe version of "Old Man Logan" called Earth-21923 (Note: Earth-21923 was designated in X of Swords Handbook #1.) is reborn on the Battleworld domain called the Wastelands, a recreation of his native reality with his memories still intact, although he does not know how he arrived in Battleworld. After having declared the intention to set his world right, Logan disrupts a poker game between the Gladiator and his Flying Devils, and he ends their human trafficking ring by killing them, freeing those imprisoned. While on the way back to meet with Danielle Cage, Logan witnesses the head of an Ultron Sentinel fall from above. Wishing to investigate further, he brings it along with him back home, where Bruce Jr. and Danielle also live. After explaining this new development, he investigates the head's origins. He visits Hammer Falls and meets with the dying Emma Frost, and he learns that the head is from beyond the Wastelands, so he begins traveling beyond his domain.

When Logan trespasses upon its borders, he is approached by an unidentified Thor of the Thor Corps. She attacks Logan with a lightning bolt for breaking Doctor Doom's laws, falling into the Domain of Apocalypse in the process. Already healed from the burns caused by the Thor's attack, Logan is attacked by Victor Creed (who is one of the Horsemen of Apocalypse) and his soldiers. Logan is rescued by the X-Men and taken to their hideout, where they are attacked by Apocalypse and his other Horsemen.

The battle that ensues is intervened by the Thor who attacked Logan earlier and as she argues with Apocalypse, Logan flees and hides. The Thor then demands to know to where he had run, but no one answers. Angry, she attacks both the X-Men and the Horsemen with a lightning bolt and then looks for Logan through the domain. When she is near the domain's walls, Logan climbs it and attacks her from behind. Enraged, the Thor attacks him with another lightning bolt and lets him fall into the neighboring domain of Technopolis as she is attacked by Apocalypse's Infinite Soldiers. Logan is taken to Stark Tower by Baron Stark and Grand Marshal Rhodes, the Thor of that domain. After healing from his injuries, Logan awakens only to find himself in a totally different domain from the one where he was. He ends up fighting Rhodes, but is defeated and sent to the Deadlands as punishment for breaking Doom's laws.

Due to his healing factor, Logan succeeds in fighting through hordes of zombies in the Deadlands. He takes shelter inside a cave, where he finds an uninfected She-Hulk. He tries to convince her to throw him out of the Deadlands when the zombies find them. In a desperate attempt to save Logan's life, She-Hulk grabs him and jumps as high as she can to throw him out of the Deadlands as he had suggested, ultimately sacrificing her own life to do so. Afterwards, Logan finds himself in the Battleworld domain called the Kingdom of Manhattan.

While wandering the city he has not seen in years, Logan meets this domain's Jean Grey and Emma Frost. They take him to meet the rest of the X-Men, as well as "his" son Jimmy Hudson. Logan later leads the superhero population of the Kingdom of Manhattan in a rebellion against God Emperor Doom. Subsequently, Logan finds himself in a new world.

==== All-New All-Different Marvel ====
Logan wakes up in the past on Earth-616 and decides to prevent his apocalyptic future. Logan experiences nightmares about a villain uprising, and Jean Grey convinces him to change his mind. He seeks help from experts to rescue Bruce Banner Jr. from the Wastelands. In the current time, he defeats the Hulk Gang with help from Hawkeye. He is also involved in the "Civil War II" and "Inhumans vs. X-Men" storylines. Logan becomes part of Kitty Pryde's Gold Team of X-Men and confronts the Weapon X organization.

==== Dead Man Logan ====
After defeating an alternate version of the Maestro, Logan recognizes that he is dying of old age, relying on Regenix to supplement his failing healing factor. He decides to return to his original timeline after sorting out a few loose ends, which include eliminating Mysterio so that the villain can never attempt the same feat he accomplished in Logan's past. Mysterio is recruited by Neo-Hydra and Miss Sinister when they learn about Logan's history, but Mysterio turns against Neo-Hydra to aid the Avengers when he learns that Neo-Hydra intends to kill him once they have won. After Logan and the Avengers defeat Neo-Hydra, Mysterio fakes his death.

Danielle Cage and Bruce Banner Jr. inform Logan that villains like the Punisher Gang are looking for him after what he did to Red Skull and Hulk, causing a power vacuum in the Wastelands. After a fight with the Tranquility Temple that tries to kill him and Bruce Banner Jr., Logan drives his group to the Badlands, where they meet with Forge and Dwight Barrett. Tracking Sabretooth to a Weapon X facility, Logan and Danielle discover that the head of the Weapon X facility is Mister Sinister, who created numerous clones of Sabretooth. Sinister claims that he orchestrated the villains' rise to power, which Red Skull took credit for. After Logan and Danielle Cage rescue Bruce Banner Jr., they are chased by the Sabretooth clones until Danielle picks up Mjolnir and becomes the new Thor. Logan dies after killing Sabretooth and Mister Sinister, weakly affirming that his healing factor has finally worn out and he has exhausted his final vial of Regenix. Danielle Cage, now acting as the new Thor, Bruce Banner Jr. as the new Hulk, and Dwight Barrett as the new Ant-Man, form a new incarnation of the Avengers and vow to keep fighting the opposition until they can find a place they can call home.

== Other versions ==
=== Venomverse ===
Old Man Venom, an alternate universe version of Old Man Logan from Earth-21923 who bonded to a Venom symbiote, appears in Venomverse. This version raised Bruce Jr. for 15 years before telling him his true parentage. In response, Bruce Jr. leaves Logan and joins forces with Archangel and Spider-Bitch to attack him. In the ensuing fight, Logan kills Spider-Bitch before Archangel and Bruce Jr. feed him to a Venom symbiote-infused Tyrannosaurus. Logan subsequently bonds with the symbiote and kills the Tyrannosaurus and Archangel. While scolding Bruce Jr., Logan is transported to another universe and recruited by an army of Venomized individuals to help them fight the Poisons.

== In other media ==
=== Film ===
Elements of Old Man Logan are incorporated into the X-Men film series' incarnation of Logan (portrayed by Hugh Jackman).

- In The Wolverine, Logan initially refrains from unsheathing his claws and is wracked with guilt and depression after he was forced to kill Jean Grey to stop the Phoenix Force years prior during the events of X-Men: The Last Stand. While in Japan, he becomes embroiled in a plot by Ichiro Yashida to steal his healing factor after the latter tasks Viper with secretly injecting Logan with a weaponized parasite to degrade his healing.
- In Logan, an aged Logan fights to protect Charles Xavier, later Laura, despite his failing powers before he is killed in combat by a clone of himself called X-24 while protecting Laura and a group of mutant children.
- In Deadpool & Wolverine, an alternate universe variant of Logan based on the comic book incarnation of Old Man Logan makes a cameo appearance.

=== Video games ===
- The Old Man Logan incarnations of Emma Frost, Hawkeye, and Wolverine appear as alternate skins for their respective characters in Marvel Heroes.
- Old Man Logan appears as a playable character in Marvel: Contest of Champions.
- Old Man Logan appears as a playable character in Marvel Puzzle Quest.
- Old Man Logan appears as an unlockable skin in Marvel Ultimate Alliance 3: The Black Order.
- The Old Man Logan incarnation of Hawkeye appears as an alternate skin for Hawkeye in Marvel Rivals

=== Miscellaneous ===
- Old Man Logan appears in Marvel's Wastelanders, voiced by Robert Patrick.
- In November 2021, author Eoin Colfer expressed interest in writing a future "super-violent" sequel to his Artemis Fowl series inspired by Old Man Logan.

== Collected editions ==
#	Title	Material collected	Publication date	ISBN
Wolverine: Old Man Logan		Wolverine vol. 3 #66–72, Giant-Size Wolverine Old Man Logan #1	September 22, 2010	978-0-7851-3172-4
0	Warzones	Old Man Logan vol. 1 #1–5	December 8, 2015	978-0-7851-9893-2
1	Berzerker	Old Man Logan vol. 2 #1–4, Giant-Size Wolverine Old Man Logan #1	July 26, 2016	978-0-7851-9620-4
2	Bordertown	Old Man Logan vol. 2 #5–8, Uncanny X-Men #205	October 25, 2016	978-0-7851-9621-1
3	The Last Ronin	Old Man Logan vol. 2 #9–13	December 27, 2016	978-1-302-90314-5
4	Old Monsters	Old Man Logan vol. 2 #14–18	June 13, 2017	978-1-302-90573-6
5	Past Lives	Old Man Logan vol. 2 #19–24	October 3, 2017	978-1-302-90574-3
6	Days of Anger	Old Man Logan vol. 2 #25–30	February 6, 2018	978-1-302-90575-0
7	Scarlet Samurai	Old Man Logan vol. 2 #31–35	July 24, 2018	978-1-302-91094-5
8	To Kill For	Old Man Logan vol. 2 #36–40	September 18, 2018	978-1-302-91095-2
9	The Hunter and the Hunted	Old Man Logan vol. 2 #41–45	December 18, 2018	978-1-302-91096-9
10	End of the World	Old Man Logan vol. 2 #46–50, Old Man Logan Annual	January 22, 2019	978-1-302-91342-7
1	Sins of the Father	Dead Man Logan #1–6	June 19, 2019	978-1-302-91465-3
2	Welcome Back, Logan	Dead Man Logan #7–12	December 18, 2019	978-1-302-91466-0
