= Madripoor =

Fictional comic book island

- First appearance: The New Mutants #32 (October 1985)
- Created by: Chris Claremont; Steve Leialoha

In-universe information
- Type: Asian city-state
- Publisher: Marvel Comics

The Principality of Madripoor or Madripoor is a fictional island appearing in American comic books published by Marvel Comics. The island is depicted as being located in maritime Southeast Asia, and has appeared mostly associated with stories from the X-Men series. Based on illustrations, it is in the southern portion of the Strait of Malacca between Singapore and Sumatra, Indonesia.

Madripoor has made several appearances in Marvel-related media, such as the Marvel Anime franchise and the Marvel Cinematic Universe series The Falcon and the Winter Soldier and VisionQuest.

== Publication history ==
Madripoor first appeared in The New Mutants #32 (October 1985), and was created by Chris Claremont and Steve Leialoha. It was featured heavily in the Wolverine solo series (starting 1988), written by Claremont with artwork by John Buscema.

Madripoor received an entry in the Official Handbook of the Marvel Universe Update '89 #4.

== History ==
Madripoor is a fictional location apparently modeled on Singapore. They are both wealthy maritime Asian island port nations at a strategic location with a single major city. Within the Marvel Universe, Madripoor is located south of Singapore. Madripoor is divided between a Hightown, a wealthy financial district and ground for the elite, and Lowtown, an impoverished, lawless slum controlled by the criminal underworld.

Its capital and single large city is also called Madripoor. Madripoor was once a haven for pirates, and that tradition is somewhat continued today with its lawless quality. The principality does not allow other nations to extradite criminals. However, it is one of the business capitals of the Pacific Rim, with its own Trade Center.

The nation was taken over by Hydra with Madame Hydra as de facto ruler, using the nation to finance terrorist plots against the world. With Hydra's terrorist operations causing deaths in the thousands, Iron Man and S.H.I.E.L.D. overthrow Hydra and place the nation in the hands of Tyger Tiger, as she was the only person—apart from the long-absent Patch—who the natives would follow in the event of a revolt.

Wolverine's son Daken manages to take power away from Tyger Tiger by acquiring control of various financial resources and key people. This results in several days of intense violence throughout the entire nation. Part of this chaos is caused by Malcolm Colcord, who wants free rein in Madripoor for his super-soldier experiments. Colcord is stopped by Daken, Tyger, X-23, and Gambit.

In the series Avengers World, it is revealed that Madripoor rests on the head of a giant dragon that is as large as an island continent. The giant dragon was awakened by a ritual performed by Gorgon and the Hand. The dragon is beaten and returned to its resting place by Shang-Chi.

Magneto and the time-displaced X-Men use Madripoor's Hightown as the location for their headquarters while Magneto is secretly trying to find a way to send the time-displaced X-Men to their own time. At the same time, the time-displaced X-Men secretly train themselves in case Magneto returns to his villainous roots and tries to kill them.

Wolverine learns that the pre-teen criminal conspiracy called "The Hellfire Club," has taken over the criminal underworld of Madripoor. This group, sometimes referred to as Homines Verendi, has taken direct hostile action against the mutant nation of Krakoa.

== Geography ==
Madripoor is estimated to be 100 miles (160 km) in diameter. Its coastline is pockmarked with deep water bays and inlets. The center of the island is a large plateau with steep cliffs. As mentioned above, Madripoor rests on the head of a giant dragon that is as large as an island continent.

=== Points of interest ===
- Buccaneer Bay - A bay frequented by Madripoor's pirates. It is also called Dagger Bay.
- Hightown - A district of Madripoor for the rich and powerful. Hightown is one of the wealthiest places in the world and sports advanced technology and architecture.
  - Imperial Hotel - A hotel where Wolverine once rescued Lindsay McCabe.
  - King's Impresario Restaurant - A popular restaurant in Hightown.
  - Madripoor Police Force Headquarters - The headquarters of the Madripoor Police Force.
  - Reavers Universal Robotics - A factory owned by Donald Pierce.
  - Royal Palace -
  - Sovereign Hotel - It is claimed to be the expensive yet finest hotel in the whole world.
  - X-Mansion - A base of operations in Madripoor used by Magneto and the time-displaced X-Men. The mansion is later used by the Raksha, a group of mutant vigilantes.
- Lowtown - A crime-impoverished district of Madripoor.
  - Brass Monkey Saloon - It is also called the Bronze Monkey and located on 332 Cyan Street.
  - Club Azimut - A nightclub that is a front for the Vladivostok mafia.
  - Dream Street - A street in Lowtown.
  - Foxy Den Strip Bar
  - Harbor Bar - Thunderbolt Ross once visited this bar before looking for recruits for his incarnation of the Thunderbolts.
  - Jade Dragon Triad's Factory - A factory owned by the Jade Dragon Triad, who use slave labor for their operations.
  - Madame Joy's Brothel - A brothel owned by Madame Joy.
  - Princess Bar - A restaurant and drinking establishment in Lowtown. It was run by O'Donnell and Wolverine (under the alias of "Patch"). At night, the Princess Bar becomes a gathering place for local residents from both Hightown and Lowtown. The bar later gained a hotel addition, financed by Krakoan interests.
  - Wharfside - One of the worst spots in Lowtown.
- Empty Quarter - A section of the city where streets do not consistently connect to each other. The only stable point is by the lighthouse. Attempted flight from the Empty Quarter leads directly to the Negative Zone.
- Stinger - A S.H.I.E.L.D. safehouse and second generation secret base whose location is only known to Nick Fury.

== Known residents ==
Notable current and former residents of Madripoor include:

- Aardwolf (Chon Li) - A mutant crime lord with the ability of lycanthropy.
- Angel (past) - Formerly living in Madripoor with Magneto. Later returned to his original timeline.
- Beast (past) - Formerly living in Madripoor with Magneto. Later returned to his original timeline.
- Bloodscream - Sadistic former Nazi with vampiric superpowers. Worked as an enforcer for General Coy and Viper alongside Roughhouse.
- Archie Corrigan (deceased) - An American expatriate living in Madripoor and working as a local pilot and smuggler. He is an associate and friend of Wolverine (known as Patch in Madripoor). Corrigan is a veteran and former pilot for the US military, and he is the owner of the local South Seas Skyways (a company that utilizes mostly small aircraft and cargo planes)
- General Nguyen Ngoc Coy - Former South Vietnamese general who became a powerful crime lord in Madripoor and a rival of fellow crime lord Tyger Tiger.
- Cyclops (past) - Formerly living in Madripoor with Magneto. Later returned to his original timeline.
- Dragoness - Former Mutant Liberation Front member and current resident of Krakoa.
- Jessica Drew - worked as a private investigator in Madripoor during her hiatus from her role as Spider-Woman.
- Harriers - A team of mercenaries.
- Iceman (past) - Formerly living in Madripoor with Magneto. Later returned to his original timeline.
- Karma - Member of the New Mutants, lived in Madripoor while trying to bring her uncle, General Coy, to justice.
- Magneto - Formerly living in Madripoor with the time-displaced X-Men. Later resided at Krakoa
- Marvel Girl (past) - Formerly living in Madripoor with Magneto. Later returned to her original timeline.
- Lindsay McCabe - An American actress and expatriate living in Madripoor. She became a close acquaintance of Wolverine.
- Mister X - Champion of Madripoor and also a mutant.
- O'Donnell (deceased) - The co-owner of the Princess Bar.
- Patch (alias of Wolverine) - Co-owner of the Princess Bar.
- Prince Baran - Former ruler. Murdered by General Coy.
- Raksha - A vicious team of mutant vigilantes operating out of the X-Mansion in Hightown. They strive to honor the memory of Patch.
- Roche (deceased) - A crime lord.
- Rose Wu (deceased) - A friend of Patch.
- Roughouse - Enforcer to General Coy and Viper.
- Sabretooth - He once lived in Madripoor in 1959.
- Scorpion - She was born in Lowtown, Madripoor.
- Sapphire Styx - A psychic vampire.
- Seraph (deceased) - Former lover and trainer of Wolverine.
- Tai - Chief of the Madripoor Police Force and ally of Logan.
- Tyger Tiger (Jessán Hoan) - Former revolutionary and current head of state. Close friend to Archie Corrigan.
- Viper - A member of Hydra who seized control of Madripoor on their behalf.

== Alternate versions ==
A future version of Madripoor is the site of a battle between the Guardians of the Galaxy and the criminal gang headed by Rancor.

== In other media ==
=== Television ===
- Madripoor appears in the Ultimate Spider-Man episode "Game Over".
- Madripoor appears in the X-Men '97 episode "Bright Eyes".

=== Marvel Anime ===
Madripoor appears in the Marvel Anime series Marvel Anime: Wolverine and Marvel Anime: Blade, and the film Avengers Confidential: Black Widow & Punisher.

=== Marvel Cinematic Universe ===
Madripoor appears in media set in the Marvel Cinematic Universe; specifically in The Falcon and the Winter Soldier episode "Power Broker", the film Deadpool & Wolverine, and VisionQuest.

=== Video games ===
Madripoor appears in Marvel's Wolverine.
