= Kimura (character) =

- Cover art to X-23: Target X #4. Art by Mike Choi.

Publication information
- Publisher: Marvel Comics
- First appearance: New X-Men vol. 2 #31 (Dec. 2006)
- Created by: Craig Kyle; Christopher Yost; Mike Choi

In-story information
- Species: Human Mutate
- Team affiliations: The Facility
- Abilities: Highly skilled armed/unarmed combatant Indestructible skin

Kimura is a supervillain appearing in American comic books published by Marvel Comics. She first appeared in New X-Men #31 as the main antagonist of Laura Kinney / X-23.

== Publication history ==
The character was created by writers Craig Kyle and Christopher Yost as well as artist Mike Choi. Her first appearance was in New X-Men #31 (Dec. 2006). She was introduced as the villainous handler of X-23. The name Kimura (木村) is a common Japanese surname, and means "tree village".

== Fictional character biography ==
=== Origin ===
Kimura was born to an abusive alcoholic father and a negligent mother. Her school life was similar, as she was abused and tormented by her peers. Kimura's grandmother, her caregiver, tried to heal the emotional damage inflicted upon Kimura through nurturing, love, and understanding, but was unsuccessful. After her grandmother's death, Kimura took off, eventually coming into contact with the Facility. She then underwent unspecified procedures that granted her physical invulnerability, density control, and reconstruction. She then exacted revenge against those in her past who had wronged her. At the Facility, Kimura eventually assumed the same abusive role as the people who victimized her in the past, particularly to Laura Kinney.

=== The Facility ===
As an agent of the Facility, Kimura became X-23's handler. She abused X-23, finding any excuse to bully her, regardless of whether X-23 failed or not. After X-23 escaped the Facility, Kimura made it her duty to track down X-23, bring back to the Facility, and kill anyone X-23 had come in contact with.

She eventually tracks X-23 to San Francisco, where Laura lives with Aunt Debbie and cousin Megan. During a raid on Debbie's house, Kimura breaks X-23's neck. She then uses adamantium handcuffs to handcuff herself to Laura and her downstairs to Debbie and Megan, where she threatens and begins to put her finger through Megan's heart. Laura recovers from these injuries, cuts off her own hand, and handcuffs Kimura to a pipe. Laura tells Megan and Debbie to get her duffel bag and flee. Laura reattaches her own hand while Kimura says that everyone Laura loves will die and that she will be the one who kills them. Laura cuts open a gas pipe and turns on the light, causing an explosion.

=== Encounter with the New X-Men ===
Eventually tracking X-23 to the Xavier Institute for Higher Learning, Kimura proceeds to lure her target out in the open so that she can capture, but it turns out that Kimura is actually after Mercury, whom she easily captures. She and X-23 fight but she injures Laura and gets away with Mercury.

The Facility experiments on Mercury, whose liquid metal is incorporated into Predator X. After X-23 and Hellion rescue Mercury, Kimura makes her way to the Xavier Institute and makes another attempt to kill X-23. Emma Frost detects Kimura and telepathically subdues her, revealing Kimura's history of child abuse and neglect at the hands of her parents and peers. Frost tells Kimura that she is nothing but a bully who harms others like Laura despite knowing how painful it is to make up for her own abusive childhood. Frost mind-wipes Kimura, making her forget about her grandmother—the only influential and positive person in her life—and creating "a deep void that will cause [her] pain for a lifetime." Frost then implants telepathic instructions in Kimura's mind to make her hunt down the Facility's leaders, particularly Professor Harkins, who oversaw Mercury's experimentation. Over the course of six months, Kimura has her brain rewired to stop Frost's psychic command, then begins selling clones of Predator X for the Facility.

=== All-New Wolverine ===
Kimura is seen in All-New Wolverine, being responsible for helping the four sisters (X-23's clones) escape Alchemax. She made a deal with Bellona (the white-haired X-23 clone) to exchange the nanites within Bellona's body, killing her, for her help escaping and destroying Alchemax's genetics division. She is killed by X-23 by being pinned down and drowned in water.

== Characterization ==
Kimura's main characteristic is her sadism towards others. As a character she has been presented in the comics as the one character X-23 has never been able to truly defeat.

== Powers and abilities ==
Kimura has indestructible skin, strong enough to withstand anything from grenade blasts to adamantium blades. She is also highly skilled in armed and unarmed combat. These abilities were given to her sometime after joining the Facility.

== Reception ==
Kimura has been widely identified as Laura Kinney's archenemy. Several publications, such as Screen Rant, Comic Book Resources, GamesRadar+ and PopMatters, have compared Kimura to Sabretooth, the archnemesis of Wolverine. Not all reactions of Kimura as X-23's biggest foe has been well received, Eric Nierstedt of ComicsVerse felt that the retroactive addition of Kimura to X-23's history seemed "like a lame attempt to give Laura an archenemy", also expressing that the character was annoying and could not match previous villain Zander Rice. Jessie Schedeen of IGN has stated that the rivalry between the two characters defined X-23 in her early days. Andy Kubai of Screen Rant has stated believing that the character would make an excellent adversary for X-23 in a film. Drew Kopp of Comic Book Resources described Kimura as "a dark reflection of the person that Laura could have become if she allowed her desire for vengeance to consume her".
