= X-23: Target X =

Comic book limited series published by Marvel Comics

Publication information
- Publisher: Marvel Comics
- Schedule: Monthly
- Format: Limited series
- Publication date: 2006
- No. of issues: 6
- Main character: X-23

Creative team
- Written by: Christopher Yost; Craig Kyle
- Artist: Mike Choi

X-23: Target X is a 2006 six issue comic book limited series published by Marvel Comics. It was the second self titled series for the character Laura Kinney, better known as X-23. It was written by Christopher Yost and Craig Kyle, who created the character, which was drawn by Mike Choi. The series helped fully reveal X-23's previously mysterious origins. The series also portrays the first meeting of X-23 with her father Wolverine.

== Publication history ==
Before the series was named Target X it was simply referred to as X-23 Vol 2 by most. It is a sequel to the previous series (Innocence Lost), detailing the time between her escape from the facility that held her up to her arrival in New York in the series NYX. Marvel used the tagline "The ghosts of X-23's past continue to haunt her - and hunt her!" for the series.

== Plot ==
Laura has escaped the program but lost her mother in the process and S.H.I.E.L.D. has captured her. Captain America and Matt Murdock are interrogating her. Captain America's dealt with Laura's handiwork before and wants Murdock to verify her story. Laura recounts the events that brought her to this point — finding her aunt and cousin in San Francisco and dodging the efforts of the Weapon X program. Afterwards, she sets out to find her cousin Megan and aunt Deborah. Megan does not remember Laura rescuing her last time they met, but she has had nightmares ever since. Treated as an outcast at school makes it easy for her to bond with Laura. She is also able to accept Laura's past as a child assassin with a mix of horror and sympathy. When Weapon X comes calling the family is forced to flee. Laura then separates from them to find her new mission — finally meeting Wolverine.

== Reception ==
The series currently holds an 8.5 out of 10 from four professional critics on the comic book review aggregator Comic Book Roundup. of ComicsVerse Peyton Hinckle described the series by the following "If you're trying to connect all the puzzle pieces that make up Laura's history, Target X is an important series to read. It's an intimate look into young Laura's disturbed psyche at a difficult time in her life. Without reading Target X, Laura's development in later series won't make a lot of sense. If you're looking to skip a few series' on our X-23 essential reading list, don't skip this one." Eric Nierstedt also of ComicsVerse praised the series as well. He described it as superior to the earlier series Innocence Lost since Target X gave Laura her own voice. Kevin Powers of the Comic Book Bin commended the artwork by Choi.

== Prints ==
=== Issues ===
Issue	Title	Cover date	Comic Book Roundup rating	Estimated sales (first month)
#1	Part One	February 2007	—N/a	58,121, ranked 32nd in North America
#2	Part Two	March 2007	9.0 by one professional critics.	43,997, ranked 38th in North America
#3	Part Three	April 2007	9.0 by one professional critics.	42,125, ranked 45th in North America
#4	Part Four	May 2007	—N/a	41,856, ranked 52nd in North America
#5	Part Five	June 2007	8.0 by one professional critics.	41,658, ranked 55th in North America
#6	Part Six	July 2007	8.0 by one professional critics.	41,546, ranked 64th in North America

=== Collected editions ===
Title [Tagline]	Format	Material collected	Pages	Publication date	ISBN	Estimated sales (North America) [Trades]	Rated
X-23: The Complete Collection Vol. 1	TPB	X-23: Target X #1-6	456	July 27, 2016	1302901168; 978-1302901165	Combined sales: 1803	—N/a

== See also ==
- List of X-Men comics
