= X-23 (one-shot) =

Comic book

- Cover

Publication information
- Publisher: Marvel Comics
- Format: One-shot
- Publication date: 2010
- No. of issues: 1
- Main character(s): X-23

Creative team
- Written by: Marjorie Liu

X-23 is a 2010 comic book one-shot published by Marvel Comics. It follows title character X-23 as she contemplates her existence. It was written by Marjorie Liu, who would later go on to write an ongoing series by the same name for the character due to the one-shot's success.

== Publication history ==
The one-shot was published in May 2010 and is 38 pages long. It was rated PA (Parental Advisory) and had the UPC id of 5960607108-00111. The story was collected in the trade paperback Mighty Marvel: Women of Marvel on March 16, 2017. It had an estimated print run of 27.325.

== Plot ==
X-23 (Laura Kinney), Wolverine, and Jubilee look for killers who hunt former mutants. Laura goes on off on her own and runs into old acquaintances.

== Reception ==
The comic holds an 8.0 out of 10 from professional critics on the comic book review aggregator Comic Book Roundup.

== See also ==
- List of X-Men comics
