= X-23 (2018 series) =

Comic book series

Publication information
- Publisher: Marvel Comics
- Schedule: Monthly
- Format: Ongoing series
- Publication date: 2018
- Main character: X-23

Creative team
- Written by: Mariko Tamaki
- Artist(s): Juann Cabal; Georges Duarte; Diego Olortegui

X-23 is a 2018 comic book series published by Marvel Comics. It is the fourth volume entitled X-23.

== Publication history ==
In June 2015, it was announced that following that year's "Secret Wars" storyline, Laura would take on the Wolverine mantle, as the main character in the series All-New Wolverine, by writer Tom Taylor and artist David López, and wearing a costume resembling Wolverine's but with the return of the original Wolverine her title was ended and a new volume was launched under X-23 written by Mariko Tamaki and drawn by Juann Cabal. Tamaki said, "This is a story about being in the very weird kind of family that someone like Laura finds herself in. It's about what it means to wrestle with legacy and identity when you were created to be a weapon and not someone with a birthday and a sister." The series ran for 12 issues before being folded into the new Dawn of X reboot by Jonathan Hickman.

== Plot ==
Laura Kinney gives up the Wolverine mantle and returns to her X-23 code name "X-23", then she, her little sister Gabby and pet Jonathan continue to fight as superheroes and balance their lives. While adjusting to being a part of each other's lives, the two must also with another new clone, which happens to be a cyborg and an X Assassin.

== Collected issues ==
The entire fourth volume has been collected into the two following paperbacks.

Title	Material collected	Pages	Publication Date	ISBN
X-23, Vol. 1: Family Album	X-23 (vol. 4) #1–6	136	January 22, 2019	Paperback: 978-1302913083
X-23, Vol. 2: X-Assassin	X-23 (vol. 4) #7–12	136	August 13, 2019	Paperback: 978-1302916862

== Reception ==
The series currently holds an 8.1 out of 10 from 93 professional critics on the comic book review aggregator Comic Book Roundup.

== See also ==
- List of X-Men comics
