= Predator X (character) =

Comic book character

- Predator X. Art by Trevor Hairsine.

Publication information
- Publisher: Marvel Comics
- First appearance: New X-Men #34 (2007)
- Created by: Christopher Yost; Craig Kyle; Paco Medina

In-story information
- Team affiliations: The Facility
- Abilities: Superhuman strength, speed, agility, reflexes, stamina, senses, and durability; Razor-sharp claws and teeth; Toxic saliva; Regenerative healing; Armored bio-metallic skin; X-gene detection; Genetic assimilation/adaptation

Predator X is a character appearing in American comic books published by Marvel Comics. The character is depicted as an adversary of Marvel's mutant characters, including the X-Men. Created by Christopher Yost, Craig Kyle, and Paco Medina, Predator X first appeared in New X-Men #34 (2007).

== Publication history ==
Predator X debuted in New X-Men #34 (2007), and was created by Christopher Yost, Craig Kyle, and Paco Medina. It later appeared in issues 36, 42-46, the 1981 Uncanny X-Men series, and the 2007 "X-Men: Messiah Complex" storyline.

== Fictional character biography ==
Before his death, William Stryker requested a living weapon to combat the mutant Anti-Christ, which resulted in the creation of three mutant-hunting creatures called "Predator X". Part of Mercury's metallic skin is removed to augment Predator X, leaving her traumatized. Two of the Predators are killed by Sentinels and X-23 respectively, while the third escapes.

Predator X heads toward the X-Mansion and is confronted by Surge, who instructs the students to head to the infirmary. In pursuit of the wounded mutants, Predator X overcomes Surge and attacks the infirmary. Wolverine destroys Predator X by letting it eat him, then tearing his way out of its stomach.

Following the events of Utopia, Scalphunter is kidnapped by a group of non-mutant superhumans. When the X-Men attempt to rescue him, several Predators attack them before being killed. A sixth Predator X operates in New York City before being killed by Fantomex.

== Powers and abilities ==
Predator X is highly resistant to physical damage, being able to draw in materials from the surrounding environment to reform itself. Predator X also possesses superhuman strength and endurance, as well as the ability to track mutants by their genetic signature and generate acid. Predator X was reported to run at speeds of 100 kilometres per hour (62 mph) for nineteen hours without slowing down.

== In other media ==
- Predator X drones appear in Marvel Heroes.
- Predator X appears in Marvel Disk Wars: The Avengers, voiced by Tarusuke Shingaki in Japanese and Steve Blum in English.
