= X-23 (2010 series) =

Comic book series

Publication information
- Publisher: Marvel Comics
- Schedule: Monthly
- Format: Ongoing series
- Publication date: 2010
- No. of issues: 21
- Main character: X-23

Creative team
- Written by: Marjorie Liu

X-23 is a comic book series written by Marjorie Liu, published by Marvel Comics. It was the first ongoing series for the character Laura Kinney, better known as X-23.

== Publication history ==
The series was prompted by the success of Liu's one-shot X-23 from earlier in the year. The series ran for 21 issues.

== Plot ==
=== "The Killing Dream" ===
X-23 begins having apocalyptic nightmares involving a demonic Wolverine asking her to be his "right hand in hell." Due to this, she sleeps outside as not to cause any alarm among her roommates. A rift has arisen between her and her former teammates, who are now wary of her due to her having been a part of X-Force. The only ones who side with her are Dust and Hellion. She pleasantly surprises Hellion when she tells him she has missed him, and the two share a brief moment. However, Surge's antagonizing of Laura forces Cyclops to intervene. He then tells her to visit a halfway house in San Francisco for former mutants who are trying to live normal lives. As she steps into the building, she suddenly experiences a vision similar to her dreams with the building on fire and her surrounded by dismembered corpses.

A flashback opening the second chapter of "The Killing Dream" shows Wolverine and X-23 at a theme park. While they are preparing for the roller coaster to launch, Wolverine states he is adopting her as his daughter. When brought back to the present, the fire was implied to be started by the devil possessing Wolverine. He meets X-23 in the hospital and seemingly "kills" Hellion before diving into her mind. He tries to convince her to join him as his queen in Hell. X-23 finds her inner "light" and banishes him from her mind. She awakes to find that there is blood everywhere but she and Hellion are fine. She also notices a symbol on her hand, which Marjorie Liu promised would be a long mystery. The X-Men are perplexed about her situation and want her to stay so that they can "fix" her, but Gambit convinces them otherwise. X-23 silently visits Hellion's room, unaware that he knows she was there, before she leaves Utopia.

=== "Songs of the Orphan Child" ===
X-23 begins her journey towards self-discovery. X-23, flanked by Gambit, encountered a young girl named Alice and witness her being murdered. However, they encounter Alice the next day, very much alive and well. Encouraging them to follow her to a peculiar desert laboratory, Alice introduces them to her employer/owner/adoptive mother: Claudine (Miss Sinister). Revealing herself openly to X-23, Claudine explains that Alice is also a clone, fourth of a series of five created by Essex as another experiment alongside several other children that live in the complex. She then expands upon her own origins, stating that the process of becoming what she is left her with vague, but invasive memories of Essex's life and that as a malignant presence within her mind. He is slowly killing her as a means of self-resurrection. He even manages to manifest briefly before being re-absorbed back into her. Claudine then incapacitates Gambit and straps X-23 to a peculiar chair, stating her aim to switch their bodies – thus inheriting Laura's healing factor. She has wanted the healing factor since her stabbing, and hopes it will free her of Essex. The plan backfires when Essex controls Laura's body and uses her to mortally wound Claudine again. Laura manages to overcome Essex's presence in her mind, expelling it through force of will. Laura, Alice and Gambit manage to escape the laboratory as it collapses and arrange for the children to be given new homes before setting off on their journey again. In the wreckage left behind, Claudine is still barely alive, and is being watched over by the fifth Alice clone – the new host of Essex.

=== "Collision" ===
During the "Collision" storyline, X-23 and Gambit travel to Madripoor in pursuit of Malcolm Colcord, who wants to revive the Weapon X program that created Wolverine. They pursue Daken in the belief that he can lead them to Colcord, and later enlist the help of the crime boss Tyger Tiger to concoct a plan to rid Madripoor of both Colcord and Daken, but after a fight between X-23 and Daken reaches a stalemate, she resolves that she does not need Daken's help, and is later taken captive. Daken helps to free her because, he says, he knew Colcord would want X-23 once he knew Colcord was rebuilding the Weapon X program, but allowed Colcord to capture her to see what he could learn. The two are badly burned by a bomb detonated by Colcord, before X-23 and Gambit depart for Paris.

In Paris, X-23 and Gambit pursue the person in possession of the "trigger scent" that sends X-23 into a berserk rage, and the DNA of her and Daken. When Gambit discovers that X-23 still causes bodily harm to herself, he contacts Wolverine, who counsels X-23 about filling her heart with better memories. Gambit questions Wolverine about why he never treated X-23 with the same compassion as Jubilee. Wolverine admits that he did not make the right decisions with X-23, a problem he intends to rectify it for both young women.

X-23 and Jubilee subsequently bond over their common experiences. Following her transformation into a vampire, Jubilee has come to feel that the people she once considered friends are now afraid of her, a pain with which X-23 sympathizes, because she was born and raised to be a killer, and found transitioning to civility difficult. During the storyline, Jubilee assists Wolverine and Gambit in their attempts to calm X-23 during her berserker rages.

=== "Chaos Theory" ===
While having a dream of a mysterious symbol, Laura wakes up in a cab with Gambit in New York. The two later meet with Cecilia Reyes, as Gambit was bleeding from his groin, and X-23 left him in Cecilia's care while she went to search Alex Cimini for information. After finding him in a lab in the University Physics Department, she leaves. Unknown to her, a bright light appears in the lab Alex was in. While walking on the street, Laura sees the same symbol from her dream in the sky and on a man. An earthquake follows and the building near her collapses. As Laura was helping an elderly woman come down from a building, Spider-Man appears and helps bring them down. Laura and Spider-Man later see the symbol appearing in the sky at the same time, and they both realize that they have been dreaming of the same symbol. After the two help save civilians from the collapsed building, Laura and Spider-Man are approached by Reed Richards, Susan Storm, and Ben Grimm. The Future Foundation then bring Laura back to the Baxter Building to run some tests and discover that she is emitting the same energy signatures that were responsible for the earthquake. Later, a device shows Reed and Valeria that Laura, Spider-Man and Sue were all emitting the same energy signature. Spider-Man realises that the energy emitting from them is involved with the Uni-Power that changes beings into Captain Universe. While discussing this, Valeria activates the device and Laura, Spider-Man and Sue are transported to an alien world. There they are confronted by monstrous warriors. The creatures are revealed to be the Whirldemons, creatures imprisoned by Prince Wayfinder, who eventually became the Enigma Force. During her confrontation with the Whirldemon King, Laura learns that the emblem on her hand from the first time they bonded is a mark associated with the Enigma force marking her as the ultimate heir to its power. She then bonds with the entity a second time to repair the seal preventing the demons from escaping into the world again.

=== "Misadventures In Babysitting" ===
X-23 babysits Reed and Susan's children Franklin and Valeria. She is trying to decide what direction to take in her life. Valeria and Franklin Richards play with a temporal window, that unleashes a dragon. Hellion appears as all of them are transported to a space junkyard. Hellion finally kisses X-23 only to be rejected by her saying that she no longer has feelings for him. Jubilee appears to tell her to come back to Utopia so that she can make a decision as to what side of the "schism" she wants to be on.

== Reception ==
The series currently holds an 8.1 out of 10 from 57 professional critics on the comic book review aggregator Comic Book Roundup.

== Collected editions ==
Title	Material collected	Publication date	ISBN
X-23: The Complete Collection Vol. 1	X-23 (vol. 1) #1–6, X-23: Target X #1–6, Captain Universe/X-23 #1, X-23 (vol. 2) #1, X-23 (vol. 3) #1–3, material from X-Men: To Serve and Protect #2	August 16, 2016	978-1302901165
X-23: The Complete Collection Vol. 2	X-23 (vol. 3)# 4–21, Daken: Dark Wolverine #8–9, material from Wolverine: The Road to Hell #1, All-New Wolverine Saga #1	December 20, 2016	978-1302901172

== See also ==
- List of X-Men comics
