= List of X-Men comics =

The X-Men are a team of superheroes appearing in American comic books published by the Marvel Comics. The X-Men first appeared in the self-titled X-Men comic, cover dated September 1963. Due to the X-Men's immense popularity, Marvel has launched dozens of spin-off series, called "X-Legs" throughout the years.

Like Uncanny X-Men, most X-books feature mutants, humans born with extraordinary powers due to a genetic mutation. Some X-Books feature mutant superhero teams while others feature solo adventures of characters who became popular in Uncanny X-Men or another X-Book. Occasionally, X-Books use mutants as a metaphor for racial, religious and other minorities oppressed by society.

For the purpose of this list, "X-Men Comics" will be defined by the following criteria:

- The series was meant to continue indefinitely, was not a limited series. For limited series, see List of X-Men limited series.
- The series featured mostly characters associated with and/or concepts originating in Uncanny X-Men or another X-Book, thus The Defenders and The Champions, which featured both X-Men-related and non-X-Men related characters will not be counted and neither will series which occasionally featured the X-Men characters, such as Marvel Comics Presents, Marvel Team-Up and What If?.

== A ==
- A+X (2012–2014), #1–18
- Adventures of the X-Men (1996–1997), #1–12 (all-new stories continuing the continuity of the Fox Network's X-Men animated series)
- Age of Apocalypse (2012–2013), #1–14
- Agent X (2002–2003), #1–15
- All New Exiles, vol. 1 (1995–1996), #1–11, Infinity
- All-New Wolverine, vol. 1 (2015–2018), #1–35, Annual #1
- All-New X-Factor (2014–2015), #1–20
- All-New X-Men, vol. 1 (2012–2015), #1–41, Annual #1
- All-New X-Men, vol. 2 (2016–2017), #1–19, Annual #1, #1.MU
- Alpha Flight, vol. 1 (1983–1994), #1–130, Annual #1–2
- Alpha Flight, vol. 2 (1997–1999), #1–20, #-1, Annual #1998
- Alpha Flight, vol. 3 (2004–2005), #1–12
- Alpha Flight, vol. 4 (2011–2012), #1–8, #0.1
- Amazing X-Men, vol. 2 (2013–2015), #1–19, Annual #1
- Astonishing X-Men, vol. 3 (2004–2013), #1–68, Giant-Size #1, Annual #1
- Astonishing X-Men, vol. 4 (2017–2018), #1–17, Annual #1

== B ==
- Bishop: The Last X-Man (1999–2001), #1–16
- The Brotherhood (2001–2002), #1–9

== C ==
- Cable, vol. 1 (1993–2002), #1–107, #-1, Annual '99
- Cable, vol. 2 (2008–2010), #1–26, King-Size Spectacular
- Cable, vol. 3 (2017–2018), #1–5, #150–159
- Cable, vol. 4 (2020–2021), #1–12
- Cable & Deadpool (2004–2008), #1–50
- Cable and X-Force (2013–2014), #1–19
- Children of the Atom (2021), #1–6
- Classic X-Men (1986–1990), #1–110 (reprinted late 1970s and early 1980s issues of X-Men, vol. 1, re-titled X-Men Classic from issue #46)
- Cyclops, vol. 3 (2014–2015), #1–12

== D ==
- Dazzler (1981–1986), #1–42
- Daken: Dark Wolverine (2010–2012), #1–23, #9.1
- Dark Wolverine (2009–2010), #75–90 (continued from Wolverine vol. 3)
- Deadpool, vol. 2 (1997–2002), #1–69, #-1, #0, Daredevil/Deadpool Annual 1997, Deadpool & Death Annual 1998
- Deadpool, vol. 3 (2008–2012), #1–63, #33.1, #49.1, Annual #1
- Deadpool: Team-Up, vol. 2 (2009–2011), #899-883
- Deadpool, vol. 4 (2012–2015), #1–45, Annual #1–2, Bi-Annual #1
- Deadpool, vol. 5 (2015–2017), #1–36, #3.1, Annual #1
- Deadpool, vol. 6 (2018–2019), #1–15 (LGY #301–315), Annual #1 (continued from Despicable Deadpool vol. 1)
- Deadpool, vol. 7 (2019–2021), #1–10
- Deadpool, vol. 8 (2022–2023), #1–10
- Deadpool Max (2010–2011), #1–12
- Deadpool & the Mercs for Money, vol. 2 (2016–2017), #1–10
- Deadpool: Merc with a Mouth, vol. 1 (2009–2010), #1–13
- Despicable Deadpool, vol. 1 (2017–2018), #287–300 (continued from Deadpool vol. 5)
- District X (2004–2005), #1–14
- Domino, vol. 3 (2018–2019), #1–10, Annual #1

== E ==
- Emma Frost (2003–2004), #1–18
- Excalibur comic series spans multiple volumes. Volume 1 (1988–1998) includes issues #1–125, along with two annuals (#1–2) and a special issue #-1. Volume 3 (2004–2005) consists of 14 issues (#1–14). Lastly, Volume 4 (2019–2021) runs for 26 issues (#1–26).
- Exiles comic series spans three volumes. Volume 1 (2001–2008) includes issues #1–100 and one annual (#1). Volume 2 (2009) runs for six issues (#1–6), while Volume 3 (2018–2019) consists of 12 issues (#1–12).
- Extraordinary X-Men (2016–2017), #1–20, Annual #1
- Exceptional X-Men (2024–2025), #1–13

== F ==
- Fallen Angels, vol. 2 (2020), #1–6

== G ==
- Gambit, volume 3 (1999–2001), #1–25, #½, Annuals '99 and 2000.
- Gambit, volume 4 (2004–2005) #1–12
- Gambit, volume 5 (2012–2013) #1–17
- Generation Hope (2011–2012), #1–17
- Generation X, vol 1 (1994–2001), #1–75, #-1, #½, Annual '95, '96, '97, Generation X/Dracula Annual '98, and '99.
- Generation X, vol 2 (2017–2018), #1–9, #85–87 (legacy numbers)
- Generation X-23 (2026), #1–10

== H ==
- Hellions (2020–2021), #1–18
- Hellverine (2024B), #1–10

== I ==
- Iceman, vol. 3 (2017–2018), #1–11
- Immortal X-Men (2022–2023), #1–18
- Inglorious X-Force (2026), #1–10

== J ==
- Jean Grey, vol. 1 (2017–2018), #1–11

== K ==
- Knights of X (2022), #1–5

== L ==
- Laura Kinney: Wolverine (2024–2025), #1–10
- Legion of X (2022–2023), #1–10

== M ==
- Magik, vol. 2 (2025), #1–10
- Magneto (2014–2015), #1–21
- Maverick (1997–1998), #1–12
- Marauders comic series is split into two volumes. Volume 1 (2019–2022) includes issues #1–27 and an annual (#1). Volume 2 (2022–2023) runs for 12 issues (#1–12).
- Maximum X-Men (2026–ongoing), #1–
- Midnight X-Men (2026–ongoing), #1–
- Mystique (2003–2005), #1–24

== N ==
- Namor: The First Mutant (2010–2011), #1–11, Annual #1
- New Excalibur (2006–2007), #1–24
- New Exiles (2008–2009), #1–18, Annual #1
- New Mutants series spans multiple volumes. Volume 1 (1983–1991) includes issues #1–100 and seven annuals (#1–7). Volume 2 (2003–2004) runs for 13 issues (#1–13). Volume 3 (2009–2012) consists of 50 issues (#1–50), while Volume 4 (2019–2023) contains 33 issues (#1–33).
- New X-Men vol. 1 (2001–2004), #114–156, Annual #1, previously titled X-Men vol. 2 becomes X-Men from issue #157, then X-Men: Legacy vol. 1 from issue #208
- New X-Men vol. 2 (2004–2008), #1–46, previously titled The New Mutants vol. 2 relaunches as Young X-Men
- Nightcrawler comic series spans two volumes. Volume 3 (2004–2005) consists of 12 issues (#1–12), and Volume 4 (2014–2015) also contains 12 issues (#1–12).
- NYX, vol. 1 (2003–2005), #1–7
- NYX, vol. 2 (2024–2025), #1–10

== O ==
- Old Man Logan, vol. 2 (2016–2018), #1–50, Annual #1

== P ==
- Phoenix (2024–2025), #1–15
- Professor Xavier and the X-Men (1995–1997), #1–18
- Psylocke (2024–2025), #1–10

== Q ==
- Quicksilver (1997–1998), #1–13, Heroes For Hire/Quicksilver Annual '98

== R ==
- Realm of X, #1-4 (2023)
- Rogue, vol. 3 (2004–2005), #1–12

== S ==
- Sabretooth Classics (1994–1995), #1–15 reprinted various appearances of the popular villain
- Savage Wolverine, vol. 1 (2013–2014), #1–23
- Sentinel, vol. 1 (2003–2004), #1–12
- Spider-Man/Deadpool, vol. 1 (2016–2019), #1–50, #1.MU
- Spider-Man and the X-Men, vol. 1 (2014–2015), #1–6
- Soldier X, vol 1 (2002–2003), #1–12
- Storm, vol. 2 (2006), #1–6
- Storm, vol. 3 (2014–2015), #1–11
- Storm, vol. 4 (2024–2025), #1–12
- S.W.O.R.D., vol. 2 (2020–2021), #1–11

== U ==
- Ultimate Comics: X-Men (2011–2013), #1–33, #18.1
- Ultimate Wolverine (2025–2026), #1–16
- Ultimate X-Men (2001–2009), #1–100, Annual #1–2, revitalization of the team in the "Ultimate Marvel Universe"
- Ultimate X-Men (2024–2026) #1–24
- Uncanny X-Force, vol. 1 (2010–2012), #1–35, #5.1, #19.1
- Uncanny X-Force, vol. 2 (2013–2014), #1–17
- Uncanny X-Men, vol. 1 (1981–2011), #142–544, #534.1, #-1, Annual #5–18, '95–'99, 2000, 2001, Annual #1–3, previously titled X-Men vol. 1
- Uncanny X-Men, vol. 2 (2011–2012), #1–20 (LGY #545-564)
- Uncanny X-Men, vol. 3 (2013–2015), #1–35 (LGY #565-599), #600, Annual #1
- Uncanny X-Men, vol. 4 (2016–2017), #1–19 (LGY #601-619), Annual #1
- Uncanny X-Men, vol. 5 (2018–2019), #1–22 (LGY #620–641), Annual #1
- Uncanny X-Men, vol. 6 (2024–ongoing), #1–

== W ==
- Wade Wilson: Deadpool (2026–ongoing), #1–
- Warlock (1999–2000), #1–9
- Way of X, vol. 1 (2021), #1–5
- Weapon X, vol. 2 (2002–2004), #0–28
- Weapon X-Men, vol. 2 (2025), #1–5
- Weapon H (2018–2019), #1–12
- Wolverine series includes multiple volumes. Volume 2 (1988–2003) features issues #1–189, including #102.5, #-1, and #½, along with annuals from 1995 to 1997, 1999, 2000, and 2001. Volume 3 (2003–2010) runs from #1–74 and includes two annuals (#1–2). It was re-titled Dark Wolverine from 2009 to 2010, starting with issue #75. Volume 4 (2010–2012) contains issues #1–20, #5.1, #300–317, #900, #1000, and an annual (#1). Volume 5 (2013–2014) includes 13 issues (#1–13). Volume 6 (2014) runs for 12 issues (#1–12) and has an annual (#1). Volume 7 (2020–2024) includes 50 issues (#1–50). Volume 8 is ongoing.
- Wolverine: First Class (2008–2009), #1–21
- Wolverine: MAX (2012–2014), #1–15
- Wolverine: Origins (2006–2010), #1–50, Annual #1
- Wolverine: The Best There Is (2010–2011), #1–12
- Wolverine and the X-Men, vol. 1 (2011–2014), #1–42, #27AU, Annual #1
- Wolverine and the X-Men, vol. 2 (2014), #1–12
- Wolverine: Weapon X (2009–2010), #1–16
- Wolverines (2015), #1–20

== X ==
- X-23, vol. 3 (2010–2012), #1–21
- X-23, vol. 4 (2018–2019), #1–12
- X-Cellent, vol. 1 (2022), #1–5
- X-Cellent, vol. 2 (2023), #1–5
- X-Corp (2021), #1–5
- X-Factor, vol. 1 (1986–1998), #1–149, -1, Annual #1–9
- X-Factor, vol. 3 (2005–2013), #1–50, #200–262, #224.1
- X-Factor, vol. 4 (2020–2021), #1–10
- X-Factor, vol. 5 (2024–2025), #1–10
- X-Force, vol. 1 (1991–2002), #1–129, #-1, Annual #1–3, 1999, X-Force and Cable Annual '95–'97, X-Force/Champions Annual '98
- X-Force, vol. 3 (2008–2010), #1–28, Annual #1
- X-Force, vol. 4 (2014–2015), #1–15
- X-Force, vol. 5 (2018–2019), #1–10 (LGY #231–240)
- X-Force, vol. 6 (2019–2024), #1–50, Annual #1
- X-Force, vol. 7 (2024–2025), #1–10
- X-Man (1995–2001), #1–75, #-1, Annual '96–'98
- X-Men, vol. 1 (1963–1981), #1–141, Annual #1–4, re-titled Uncanny X-Men from issue #142
- X-Men, vol. 2 (1991–2001), #1–113, #-1, #1/2, Annual #1–3, '95–'97, '99, 2000, X-Men and Dr. Doom Annual '98, re-titled New X-Men vol. 1 from issue #114
- X-Men, vol. 2 (2004–2008), #157–207, Annual #1, previously titled New X-Men vol. 1, re-titled X-Men: Legacy from issue #208
- X-Men, vol. 3 (2010–2013), #1–41, #15.1, Giant-Size #1
- X-Men, vol. 4 (2013–2015), #1–26
- X-Men, vol. 5 (2019–2021), #1–21
- X-Men, vol. 6 (2021–2024), #1–35
- X-Men, vol. 7 (2024–ongoing), #1–
- X-Men Infinity Comic (2026), #1–20
- X-Men 2099 (1993–1996), #1–35
- X-Men '92, vol. 2 (2016), #1–10
- X-Men Adventures, vol 1 (1992–1994), #1–15, retold stories from the Fox Network's X-Men animated series, Season 1
- X-Men Adventures, vol 2 (1994–1995), #1–13, retold stories from the Fox Network's X-Men animated series, Season 2
- X-Men Adventures, vol 3 (1995–1996), #1–13, retold stories from the Fox Network's X-Men animated series, Season 3
- X-Men Blue (2017–2018), #1–36, Annual #1
- X-Men Classic (1990–1995), #46–110, previously titled Classic X-Men, reprinted issues of Uncanny X-Men from the early to mid-1980s
- X-Men: Evolution, vol. 1 (2002), #1–9, retold stories from the Warner Brothers Network animated series of the same name
- X-Men: First Class, vol. 2 (2007–2008), #1–16
- X-Men Forever, vol. 2 (2009–2010), #1–24, Annual #1, Giant-Size #1
- X-Men Forever 2 (2010–2011), #1–16
- X-Men Gold, vol. 2 (2017–2018), #1–36, Annual #1–2
- X-Men United, (2026–ongoing), #1–
- X-Men: Legacy, vol. 1 (2008–2012), #208–275, #260.1, Annual #1, previously titled X-Men vol. 2
- X-Men: Legacy, vol. 2 (2012–2014), #1–24, #300
- X-Men Legends, vol. 1 (2021–2022), #1–12
- X-Men Legends, vol. 2 (2022–2023), #1–6
- X-Men: Red, vol. 1 (2018), #1–11, Annual #1
- X-Men: Red, vol. 2 (2022–2023), #1–18
- X-Men: The Early Years (1994–1995), #1–17, reprinted issues of X-Men, vol. 1 from the early 1960s
- X-Men: The Hidden Years (1999–2001), #1–22
- X-Men: The Manga (1998–1999), #1–26, a manga-style, Japanese X-Men series
- X-Men Unlimited, vol. 1 (1993–2003), #1–50
- X-Men Unlimited, vol. 2 (2004–2006), #1–14
- X-Men Unlimited Infinity Comics (2021–2024), #1–142, a Marvel Unlimited exclusive series.
- X-Statix (2002–2004), #1–26
- X-Treme X-Men, vol. 1 (2001–2004), #1–46, Annual 1
- X-Treme X-Men, vol. 2 (2012–2013), #1–13, #7.1

== Y ==
- Young X-Men (2008–2009), #1–12

== See also ==
- List of Marvel Comics publications
- List of X-Men limited series and one-shots
