= Craig Kyle =

American comic book writer

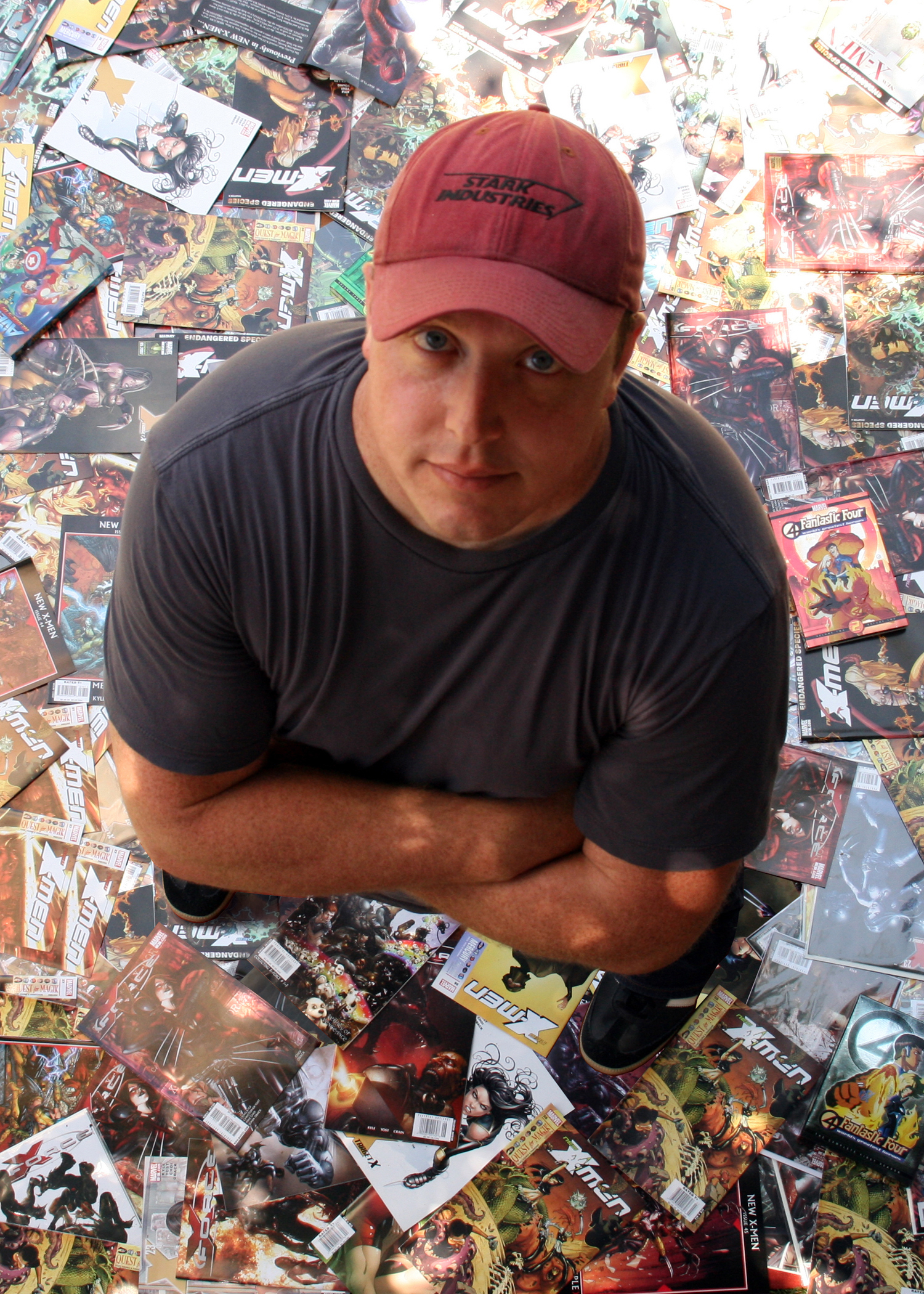
- Born: November 3, 1971 (age 55) Houston, Texas, U.S.
- Areas: Screenwriter, producer
- Pseudonym: J. D. Murray
- Notable works: X-23: Innocence Lost; X-23: Target X X-Force; Thor (Marvel Comics); Thor: The Dark World; Thor: Ragnarok; Hulk VS; Planet Hulk; Doctor Strange; New X-Men

Craig Paul Kyle (born November 3, 1971) is an American writer for Marvel Comics. He is best known for his creation of the character X-23. He has also produced several of Marvel's direct-to-DVD animated films and worked on several aspects of the Thor film series.

== Life and career ==
Kyle was born in Houston, Texas. He is a frequent collaborator with Christopher Yost, with whom he created X-23, a teenage female clone of Wolverine, for the animated series X-Men: Evolution. Marvel executives were impressed with X-23's reception on TV, and subsequently Yost and Kyle to adapt the character into comics, first by writing the character into a six-issue eponymous mini-series, and then by taking over writing chores (as of issue #20) on the New X-Men (formerly New X-Men: Academy X) title, bringing X-23 in as a regular character. The success of X-23's first miniseries (X-23: Innocence Lost) prompted Marvel to order a second six-issue miniseries with Kyle and Yost at the helm, titled X-23: Target X.

Kyle and Yost concluded their stint on the New X-Men title after the events of "X-Men: Messiah Complex" when the title turned into Young X-Men. Chris Yost and Kyle co-wrote the revamped X-Force with Clayton Crain on pencils; the cast featured Wolverine, Warpath, Wolfsbane, and X-23 as black ops agents on assassination missions per the orders of Cyclops. The series ended in 2010 and was replaced by Uncanny X-Force, written by Rick Remender.

== Filmography ==
=== Film ===
Theatrical

Year	Title	Credited as		Notes
Year	Title	Writer	Producer	Notes
2011	Thor	No	Executive	Part of the Marvel Cinematic Universe
2013	Thor: The Dark World	No	Executive	Part of the Marvel Cinematic Universe
2017	Thor: Ragnarok	Yes	No	Part of the Marvel Cinematic Universe; writer with Christopher Yost and Eric Pearson

Direct-to-video

Year	Title	Credited as		Notes
Year	Title	Writer	Producer	Notes
2006	Ultimate Avengers:The Movie	Story	Yes	Released as part of the Marvel Animated Features collection
2006	Ultimate Avengers 2: Rise of the Panther	Yes	Executive	Released as part of the Marvel Animated Features collection
2007	The Invincible Iron Man	Story	Executive	Released as part of the Marvel Animated Features collection
2007	Doctor Strange: The Sorcerer Supreme	Story	Executive	Released as part of the Marvel Animated Features collection
2008	Next Avengers: Heroes of Tomorrow	Story	Yes	Released as part of the Marvel Animated Features collection
2009	Hulk vs Thor	Story	No	Released as part of the Marvel Animated Features collection
2009	Hulk vs Wolverine	Yes	Yes	Released as part of the Marvel Animated Features collection
2010	Planet Hulk	No	Yes	Released as part of the Marvel Animated Features collection
2011	Thor: Tales of Asgard	Story	Yes	Released as part of the Marvel Animated Features collection

=== Television ===
Year	Title	Credited as		Notes
Year	Title	Writer	Producer	Notes
2000–2003	X-Men: Evolution	Yes	Yes	8 episodes
2003	Spider-Man: The New Animated Series	No	Associate	
2006	Fantastic Four	No	Yes	
2007	Fantastic Four: World's Greatest Heroes	Story	No	
2009	Wolverine and the X-Men	Yes	Yes	
2021	Pacific Rim: The Black	Yes	Executive	Web series Showrunner, alongside Greg Johnson
