= X-23 =

Marvel Comics superheroine

Laura Kinney X-23 / Wolverine
- Laura as Wolverine on the variant cover of Laura Kinney: Wolverine #6 (May 2025). Art by Simone Di Meo.

Publication information
- Publisher: Marvel Comics
- First appearance: X-Men: Evolution: "X23" (August 2, 2003)
- First comic appearance: NYX #3 (February 2004)
- Created by: Craig Kyle; Christopher Yost

In-story information
- Alter ego: Laura Kinney (born X-23)
- Species: Human mutant
- Place of origin: The Facility, unknown location in the United States
- Team affiliations: X-Men; X-Men in training; New X-Men; Avengers Academy; New Avengers; X-Force
- Notable aliases: Laura X; Talon; Captain Universe; X-23; Weapon X; Wolverine
- Abilities: Superhuman strength, durability, senses, reflexes, agility and animal-like attributes; Adamantium-plated retractable claws in hands and feet; Regenerative healing factor; Psychic resistance; Expert armed and unarmed combatant

Laura Kinney (designation X-23) is a superheroine appearing in American comic books published by Marvel Comics, commonly in association with Wolverine, whose codename she has also used, and the X-Men. The character was created by writer Craig Kyle for the X-Men: Evolution television series in 2003, before debuting in the NYX comic series in 2004. Since then she has headlined two six-issue miniseries written by Kyle and Christopher Yost, the X-23 (2010) one-shot and the 2010 X-23 (vol. 3) ongoing series written by Marjorie Liu, the 2015 All-New Wolverine ongoing series by writer Tom Taylor, the 2018 X-23 (vol. 4) ongoing series by writer Mariko Tamaki, and the 2024 Laura Kinney: Wolverine ongoing series by writer Erica Schultz. Starting in February 2026, Laura and her sister Gabby headline the ongoing series Generation X-23 by writer Jody Houser. Laura has also appeared in several team books such as Avengers Academy, New X-Men (vol. 2), X-Force (vol. 3 & 6), X-Men Red (vol. 1), X-Men (vol. 6), and NYX (vol. 2). The character also appears in other media from Marvel Entertainment.

Laura was apparently the clone and later the adoptive daughter of Wolverine, created to be the perfect killing machine. For years, she proved herself a capable assassin working for an organization called the Facility. A series of tragedies eventually led her to Wolverine and the X-Men. She attended school at the X-Mansion, and eventually became a member of X-Force. It is revealed later that she is not a clone, but the biological daughter of Wolverine. Like her father, Laura has a regenerative healing factor and enhanced senses, speed, and reflexes. She also has retractable adamantium-coated bone claws in her hands and feet. In 2015, the character succeeded her father in adopting the name and costume of Wolverine in the series All-New Wolverine. During the Krakoan Age, a duplicate of Laura is created via the mutant resurrection protocols after she is presumed dead. However, the original Laura is later discovered to be alive, leading to both versions coexisting – the original assumes the Talon codename and joins the X-Men, while the duplicate continues to use the Wolverine codename and joins X-Force. Talon then died during the Fall of X storyline.

Laura Kinney has been described as one of Marvel's most notable and powerful female heroes. In addition to comics, the character has appeared in various media, including animated film and TV series and video games. Dafne Keen portrayed the character in the film Logan (2017) and the Marvel Cinematic Universe (MCU) film Deadpool & Wolverine (2024).

== Creative origins ==
Promo shot for the "X-23" episode of X-Men: Evolution; the original design of Laura Kinney / X-23

Laura first appeared in season 3, episode 10 of the X-Men: Evolution animated television series, titled "X-23", voiced by Andrea Libman. She was later voiced by Britt Irvin in season 4, episode 3, titled "Target X".

Laura was created by Craig Kyle. He revealed that the character was his attempt to make a Wolverine to "connect more to the younger kids", as while X-Men: Evolution was a reinvention of the X-Men making the characters teenagers, "Wolverine was one of the old, grizzled guys". The characterization went for the opposite of Wolverine, where instead of a man "older than we know" with no memory of his past and the life that he lost, Laura Kinney was a young girl "shackled to the murders she's committed" whose entire life revolved around the project that made her a killer. Kyle added that the character is "Pinocchio for Marvel Comics, she's a samurai sword trying to become a real little girl". Kyle and Christopher Yost were the writers of the two episodes of X-Men: Evolution in which Laura appears ("X-23" and "Target X"), with Yost stating that Kyle "had all the beats of her origin in his head when I came on board".

== Transition to comic books and publication history ==
=== 2004–2014 ===
Laura Kinney's comic debut was in 2004 in the third issue of the Joe Quesada's NYX series, where her history and past were never divulged but her abilities were showcased. In X-23, her first miniseries, Laura's origin was fully explained. She became part of the X-Men supporting cast in Uncanny X-Men #450.

Craig Kyle and Christopher Yost also scripted X-23: Innocence Lost, a six-issue miniseries that details the character's origin, as well as X-23: Target X, a six-issue miniseries that covers the character's experiences between her origin story and her appearance in NYX. They continued to write for the character into their runs on New X-Men and X-Force as a member of the teams.

Laura Kinney starred in a monthly comic book series in 2010, written by Marjorie Liu. The series was prompted by the success of Liu's one-shot X-23 from earlier in the year. On November 15, 2011, Marvel announced that the X-23 (vol. 3) comic series would end at issue #21.

Laura Kinney appeared as a regular character in Avengers Academy from issue #23 (February 2012) through its final issue #39 (January 2013), and also appeared in Avengers Arena (2012) a series by Dennis Hopeless and Kev Walker.

In 2014, Laura joined the All-New X-Men in issue 19 after the team finds her in Florida being chased by anti-mutant religious zealots.

=== 2015–2024 ===
In June 2015, it was announced that following that year's "Secret Wars" storyline, Laura would take on the Wolverine mantle, as the main character in the series All-New Wolverine, by writer Tom Taylor and artist David López, and wearing a costume resembling Wolverine's.

After the return of Logan, Laura's title was relaunched as the fourth X-23 volume and written by Mariko Tamaki and drawn by Juann Cabal. Tamaki said, "This is a story about being in the very weird kind of family that someone like Laura finds herself in. It's about what it means to wrestle with legacy and identity when you were created to be a weapon and not someone with a birthday and a sister." The series ran for 12 issues before ending in May 2019.

In 2018, Laura—once again under the mantle of Wolverine—and her sister Gabby Kinney joined Jean Grey's X-Men Red team, written by Tom Taylor and illustrated by Mahmud Asrar. The series received critical acclaim, with several critics citing it as one of the best comics of the year.

During the Krakoan Age, as part of the Dawn of X relaunch of all X-Men-related titles, Laura joined the newest Fallen Angels series written by Bryan Edward Hill and drawn by Szymon Kudranski. The series ended after 6 issues. During Jonathan Hickman's X-Men (vol. 5) run in 2021, Laura goes on a mission into The Vault where time is accelerated and is seemingly killed after spending centuries within; the mutant resurrection protocols lead to Laura returning to life in a new body, however, her memories from The Vault were not stored so she is resurrected without them. During the Reign of X relaunch, debuting in the Hellfire Gala (2021), Laura as Wolverine is on the first team roster for Gerry Duggan's X-Men (vol. 6) run. In the Destiny of X relaunch, Laura (as Wolverine) had a starring role in the X-Terminators (2022) five-issue limited series by writer Leah Williams and artist Carlos Gómez. Also in 2022, it is revealed the original Laura had actually survived; the younger, duplicate Laura continued to use the Wolverine codename while the older, original Laura used the new Talon codename. Talon continued to be a member of Duggan's X-Men team until her death in X-Men #31 (February 2024) during Fall of X. The duplicate Laura, as Wolverine, joined the roster of Benjamin Percy's X-Force (vol. 6) in issue #39 (April 2023) until the run ended with issue #50 (March 2024); she also appeared in Percy's Wolverine (vol. 7) series which focused on Logan. Additionally in 2023, Laura was the focus of the five-issue limited series X-23: Deadly Regenesis by writer Erica Schultz and artist Edgar Salazar; this series was set in the past during the X-Men Utopia era.

=== 2024–present ===
In April 2024, it was announced that Laura would have a starring role in the ongoing series NYX (vol. 2), which began in July 2024 as part of the X-Men: From the Ashes relaunch. It was written by Collin Kelly and Jackson Lanzing with art by Francesco Mortarino. The new ongoing series centers on Laura and several other mutant young adults – Kamala Khan, Anole, Prodigy and Sophie Cuckoo – attempting to adapt to life in New York City in the post-Krakoan Age. Laura's updated Wolverine costume retains "some elements of the usual Wolverine suit, including the yellow and black color scheme", however, it also includes "a sharper cowl with more severe lines and edges" and some streetwear-inspired aspects such as "a cozy athletic jacket-type design on the top". Screen Rant highlighted that the "new NYX look blends her classic Wolverine suit with the casual-wear she often sported in her early appearances". At SDCC 2024, it was announced that a solo ongoing series focusing on Laura will be spun out of events of NYX. Schultz returned to write this series, titled Laura Kinney: Wolverine, with artist Giada Belviso; the first issue was released in December 2024.

NYX (vol.2) ended with issue #10 in April 2025. In May 2025, it was announced that the previously announced New Thunderbolts* ongoing series was retitled to New Avengers (vol. 5); it is written by Sam Humphries with art by Ton Lima and the first issue released in June 2025. This team book is led by Bucky Barnes with Laura (as Wolverine), Black Widow, Eddie Brock (as Carnage), the Hulk, Clea Strange, and Namor on the roster. Laura is also featured in the three-issue limited series Wolverines & Deadpools, by writer Cody Ziglar and artist Rogê Antônio, with the first issue released in July 2025. From October 2025 to December 2025, as part of the "Age of Revelation" event, Laura headlined the three-issue limited series Laura Kinney: Sabretooth by writer Schultz and artist Valentina Pinti. ComicsXF explained this event has a similar format to previous events such as Age of X-Man (2019) and Sins of Sinister (2023) where Marvel shuts "down a bunch of ongoing series" in order to relaunch "them with new names and concepts".

Batman/Deadpool #1, the DC Comics crossover issue with Marvel, was released in November 2025. It includes a back-up story by writer Tom Taylor and artist Bruno Redondo that features a team-up between Laura and Nightwing.

Starting in February 2026, Laura and Gabby headline the ongoing series Generation X-23 as part of the X-Men: Shadows of Tomorrow relaunch. It is written by Jody Houser with art by Jacopo Camagni. Following Camagni's death in March 2026, Houser stated that Generation X-23's second issue "is the last full issue drawn by Jacopo", adding that Jacopo "did draw part of #3, and there will be a tribute page with some of his initial designs of the Generated".

== Fictional character biography ==
=== Innocence Lost ===
Cover to X-23: Innocence Lost #2 (March 2005). Art by Billy Tan.

A top-secret program is tasked to replicate the original Weapon X experiment that bonded adamantium to the skeleton of Wolverine. The project is taken in a new direction: Dr. Martin Sutter recruits renowned mutant geneticist Dr. Sarah Kinney to develop a clone of Wolverine. Also on the team is Sutter's protégé, Dr. Zander Rice, who was raised by Sutter after his father was killed by the original Weapon X.

Since the only genetic sample from Weapon X is damaged, Kinney is unable to salvage the Y chromosome. Kinney proposes the creation of a female genetic twin. Her request is denied; Rice is opposed to the idea. After 22 failed attempts at reconstituting the DNA using a duplicate X chromosome, the 23rd sample yields a viable sample to combine with an embryo. Although Kinney is allowed to proceed, Rice exacts revenge for her insubordination by forcing her to act as the surrogate mother of the specimen. For nine months, Kinney's every move is monitored. Finally, she gives birth to "X-23".

After seven years, Rice subjects X-23 to radiation poisoning to activate her mutant gene. He extracts her claws, coats them with adamantium, and reinserts them back into her hands and feet – a procedure performed without affording the child any anesthetic. Rice creates a "trigger scent" that drives X-23 into a murderous rage when she detects it. X-23 is then trained to be a hired assassin, ordered to kill "anyone ... everyone ... for a price."

Kinney's niece Megan is abducted by a serial killer; she smuggles X-23 out of the facility to rescue her. X-23 tracks the abductor to his apartment, kills him, and frees Megan. Kinney is fired when she returns and is escorted off the base. Shortly thereafter, Rice assigns X-23 to eliminate Sutter and his family. He orders her to keep it secret. X-23 reveals to Sarah that Rice is responsible for the murders. Before Kinney leaves, Rice reveals a chamber containing the incubation pods for subjects X-24 through X-50.

Kinney drafts a letter to her daughter, assigning her a final mission: destroy the pods and kill Rice. X-23 succeeds and meets her mother, and they prepare to flee. However, prior to his death, Rice exposes Kinney to the trigger scent. X-23 goes into a murderous frenzy and kills her mother. As she lies dying, Kinney tells X-23 that her name is Laura and that she loves her, and hands her the letter and pictures of Charles Xavier, Wolverine, and the Xavier Institute.

=== Target X ===
After being arrested by S.H.I.E.L.D. agents, Laura awakens bound and gagged in the company of Captain America and Matt Murdock, who proceed to interrogate her about her past. Laura describes how she traveled to San Francisco and tracked down Megan and Debbie (her mother's sister). Introducing herself as Sarah's daughter, she moves in with them. Although Megan experiences vivid nightmares of her abduction, her family believes these to be utter fantasies. Laura informs Megan that the man in her nightmares was indeed real and that she killed him.

Debbie's boyfriend turns out to be an agent for the Facility who has been instructed to manipulate Laura into killing Megan and Debbie using the trigger scent to activate "X-23". The agent fumbles the assignment by spilling the trigger scent on himself and is killed by Laura. Facility agents storm the house, led by the woman who served as Laura's handler as X-23, Kimura, who had treated her harshly in the facility, punishing her even if the missions went according to plan.

Laura manages to get Megan and Debbie to safety by handcuffing Kimura to a radiator and then triggering an explosion in the house, buying some time. After Laura and Megan part, Laura decides to confront the man who made her creation possible, Wolverine. Laura tracks Wolverine to Xavier's mansion and engages him in a battle, defeating him using tactics and maneuverability. She does not kill Wolverine, instead telling him why she came. Wolverine reveals that he is aware of Laura's ordeal, having received a detailed letter from her mother. The talk is then interrupted when S.H.I.E.L.D. agents led by Captain America come to arrest Laura.

Despite the mayhem in her past, Matt Murdock accepts Laura's innocence. Captain America wants Laura to atone for the murders she has committed, but ultimately frees her both due to realizing the true situation of her brainwashing, and to avoid S.H.I.E.L.D. exploiting her as their own weapon. He takes Laura to a bus station and tells Laura to return to Logan. While on the bus, Laura pulls out letters from her mother and begins shedding tears as she reads them.

=== NYX ===
Laura surfaces in New York City and is again brainwashed, this time by a pimp named Zebra Daddy who exploits her as a prostitute catering to sadomasochistic patrons. In her spare time, Laura continues to cut herself with her own claws; unable to free herself from Zebra Daddy's control, she becomes mute and withdrawn. Upon meeting Kiden Nixon, a young mutant with the ability to freeze time when in danger, and Tatiana Caban, a mutant who can take on the physical attributes of whoever and whatever she comes into contact with via their blood, X-23 starts to come to her senses. Although she runs away from Zebra Daddy, he tracks her down. With the aid of her new-found friends (and the mutant named Bobby Soul), Zebra Daddy and his thugs are defeated: Laura kills him to save the lives of her friends. Laura abandons her new friends, but years later would eventually bump into them one last time when on an investigation with Wolverine.

=== X-Men ===
Laura takes a job as a waitress at the mutant-themed "Wannabee's" nightclub in the Mutant Town district of New York. She defends Jade Parisi, daughter of mob boss Don Parisi, against some thugs who berate her for having a mutant boyfriend. Laura kills some of the thugs and helps Jade escape and go into hiding. The deaths inadvertently implicate Wolverine, prompting his teammates to investigate. Laura attacks Wolverine on sight, but he eventually calms her down. She leads the X-Men to Parisi's daughter. After aiding the X-Men against Parisi's mutant enforcer Geech, Laura flees the scene. This encounter is later revealed to be partially arranged between Laura and Wolverine in order for her to encounter and ally with the X-Men without revealing her past.

She later returns to help the X-Men save victims of a car accident, after which she is enrolled at the Xavier Institute and assigned a room with Rachel Summers and Kitty Pryde. Laura behaves protectively towards Wolverine, observing him on the mansion's security monitors and even attacking his teammate Bishop after he floors Wolverine during a training session.

During one of her sessions at the mansion's monitors, an anomalous energy spike prompts Laura to investigate. She encounters Spider-Man at the source of the signal; mistaking him for an enemy, she attacks him. The pair ultimately team up to save the young mutant Paul Patterson from an alternate reality version of Iron Man known as Iron Maniac. The arrival of Captain America and the super-spy Black Widow help turn the tide, with Spider-Man and Laura destroying Iron Maniac's equipment using their own version of the classic Fastball Special.

Laura secretly follows Wolverine on his investigation of strange activity in the Canadian Rockies. Ambushed by the Hauk'ka, evolved Saurians from the Savage Land, Laura manages to escape and alert the X-Men. Traveling to the Savage Land, Laura and the X-Men team-up with the Savage Land's lord Ka-Zar and his allies, the Savage Land Mutates, to prevent the Hauk'ka from destroying human civilization by exerting control over the weather-manipulating X-Man, Storm.

=== Captain Universe ===
Laura is later empowered by the cosmic Uni-Power to become Captain Universe. She quickly learns that A.I.M. is seeking the Uni-Power in hopes of using it against their enemies. She agrees to help the Uni-Power, and travels with a S.H.I.E.L.D. agent called the Scorpion to a secret A.I.M. hideout. There, they discover information on the Uni-Power that is being transferred to another facility. The Scorpion attempts to copy the information, but is stopped by Laura. The Scorpion is then ordered to take her into custody, but covers for her instead and allows Laura to escape. At the close of the issue, the Uni-Power bids farewell to Laura, and parts ways with her.

=== Decimation ===
After the events of "House of M" and "Decimation", Laura was one of the few mutants to retain her powers. Having previously left the institute off-panel, she returns to the X-Mansion at Wolverine's insistence. Laura develops an attraction towards Julian Keller, aka Hellion. Following a bombing at the school by anti-mutant religious zealot William Stryker, Laura confronts Stryker at his compound, and kills three of his Purifiers, rescuing her comrades.

When Surge receives a distress call from Forge, Laura accompanies the New X-Men. Although the team disables the Nimrod unit, Laura is grievously wounded and is unable to heal herself. To save Laura, Hellion convinces Emma Frost to unlock his telekinetic potential, increasing his powers (and thus, his speed) to a level thought impossible by a Sentinel guard working for the Office of National Emergency. This allows them to fly back to the mansion in time for Laura to be healed by Elixir.

=== Mercury Falling ===
While Laura is bonding over coffee with Cessily Kincaid, the cafe is attacked by Kimura and her minions, who in turn capture Cessily. After Laura returns to the school, she and Hellion go off to locate the Facility's whereabouts. Laura interrogates a man at gun point, and upon securing the information, shoots him in the head. Hellion informs her that killing will no longer be a part of their interrogation technique.

Laura and Hellion infiltrate the Facility and after an encounter with Kimura, the two soon find Cessily in liquid form, barely able to compose herself. They are attacked by Predator X, who has absorbed Cessily's liquid mercury skin. Laura and Hellion decide to fall back, but are pursued by the Predators. The group is once again ambushed, only to be rescued by the Astonishing X-Men and New X-Men. The two teams turn the tables on the attackers, and defeat the remaining facility troops. During the scuffle, the remaining Predator escapes.

Sometime later, Emma Frost finds Kimura trying to assassinate Laura, and confronts her, erasing the one happy moment in Kimura's life from her memory, and psychically suggesting that Kimura's assignment now is to hunt down the remaining members of the Facility and kill them.

=== Messiah Complex ===
Cyclops assembles a new incarnation X-Force team that includes Laura, Wolverine, Wolfsbane, Caliban, Warpath, and Hepzibah. During the team's confrontation with Lady Deathstrike, Laura nearly kills her in revenge for Deathstrike's attack upon Hellion. Laura also saves Wolverine's life by killing Scrambler just before he scrambled Wolverine's healing factor.

Following the event of "Messiah Complex", Cyclops forms a black ops incarnation of X-Force to deal with threats preemptively. He drafts Laura Kinney for this team, though this puts him into conflict with Wolverine, whom he did not consult on this decision prior. Wolverine asks Laura to reconsider this, warning her of the life she is giving up should she continue on this path, but Laura ultimately decides to take her place on this team. Her conflict with Wolverine recurs over his observation that she is reckless with the lives of others.

=== Messiah War ===
The X-Men moved to San Francisco, where they are accepted as heroes by the mayor, having rejected the Fifty State Initiative. Laura is finally reunited with Kiden Nixon, who herself makes her first appearance outside the NYX series. This future version of Kiden is revealed to be a disruptor of time travel technology, which threatens to trap X-Force, Cable and Hope in this era. While Laura agonizes over whether to kill Kiden, Domino fatally shoots Kiden herself. In a subsequent storyline, Laura goes back in time to save Boom Boom when Domino and Warpath are neutralized. During the course of this mission, Laura's left arm is severed from her body. She is rescued by the X-Force, leading into the 2009 - 2010 "Necrosha" storyline, which sees Laura reunited with her friends from the NYX series.

=== "Second Coming" ===
Laura is shown to be part of Cyclops' "Alpha Roster" in the course of the "Second Coming" story arc. Along with the most of X-Force, Laura accompanies Cable and Cypher to the future in an attempt to shut down the Nimrod invasion. Following Cypher successfully over-riding the programming, Laura attempts to return through the temporal portal, only to sustain horrific injuries. The portal prevents any organic matter traveling through it. This leads Cable to sacrifice himself, allowing his techno-organic virus to overwhelm him, forcing the portal open and making it possible for the team to return to Utopia.

In the fallout of "Second Coming", Wolverine cuts Laura from the team, explaining to her that after a lifetime of following orders from others, she needs to learn to make her own choices and follow her own path. Laura subsequently tracks former Weapon X scientist Detlef Metzger, intending to capture him before he can perform experiments using a vial of Wolverine's blood. Instead, Metzger is kidnapped by a group of US soldiers, while Laura notices that Daken has been watching her.

=== X-23: Deadly Regenesis ===
During the time of schism between Wolverine and Cyclops, Laura is separated from the division. Wondering where she truly belongs in life, Laura decides to leave the island of Utopia. However, she shortly finds herself dealing with Kimura, The Kingpin, and a new deadly enemy harboring a personal vendetta against her.

=== X-23 (Volume 3) ===
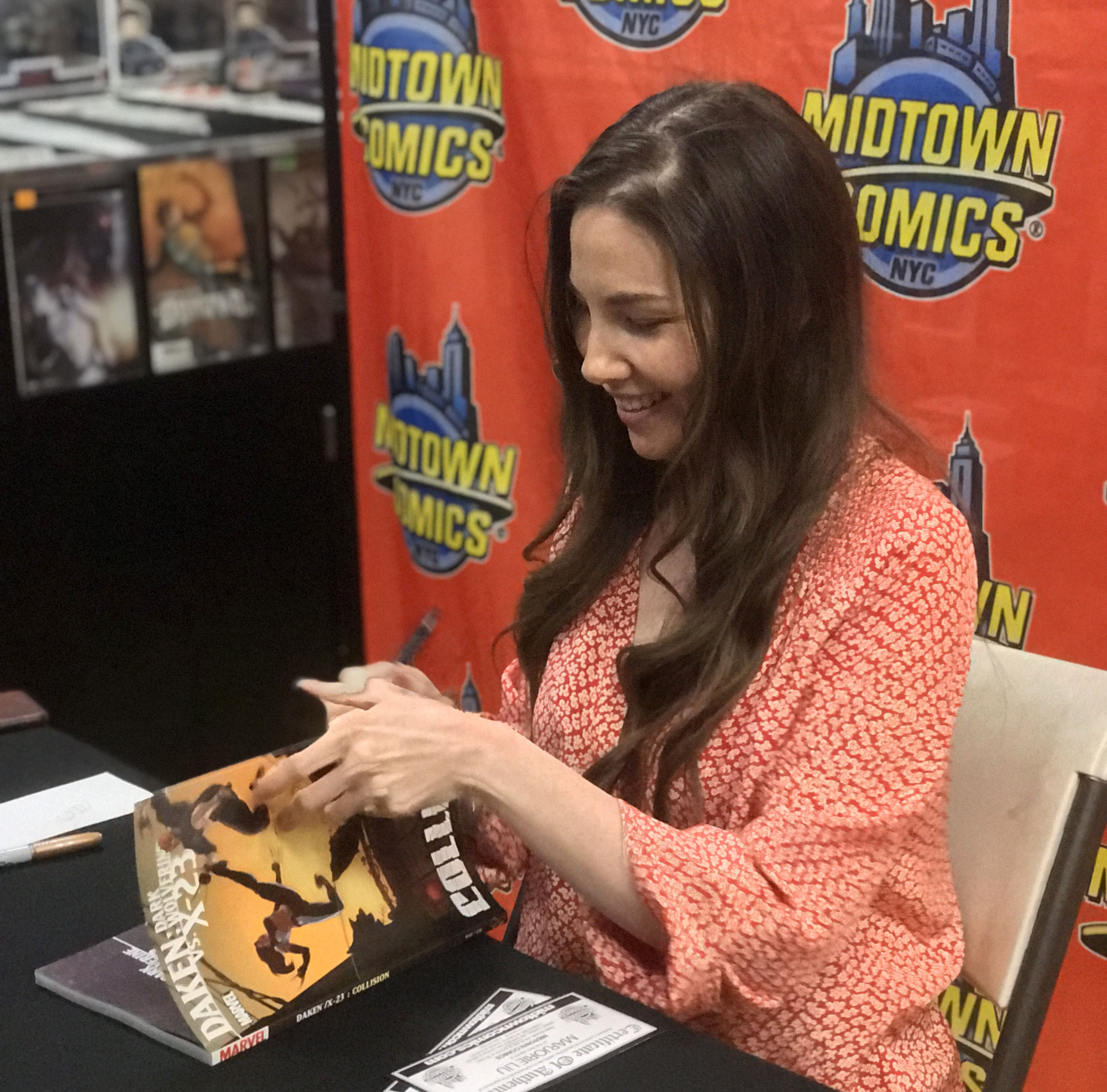
Writer Marjorie Liu autographing a copy of the Daken/X-23: Collision trade paperback at a signing at Midtown Comics in Manhattan

Laura begins having horrible nightmares for mysterious reasons, then finds herself on a journey to self-discovery and begins a friendship with Gambit. They eventually travel to Madripoor to find clues to her nightmares. Laura continues having strange dreams once again, this time about a strange symbol, so she befriends the Fantastic Four and gets the job of babysitting Franklin and Valeria Richards.

=== X-23: Girls Night Out ===
Laura is asked by Wolverine to join his side. She replies by asking if there is any other choice. While she thinks about what choice she will make, Laura goes for a walk with Jubilee and asks her why she chose Cyclops' side. Jubilee tells her she chose to stay with Cyclops because, as a vampire, she can hear the heartbeat of everyone around her, and it makes her hungry and wants to eat them. Laura tells her that she will not hurt them but Jubilee tells her that the urge is there and that she needs to fight as much she needs blood. She cannot be with Wolverine because she is afraid to violate his new philosophy: if you are a kid you do not fight, and he sees her as a kid. Jubilee tells Laura that Logan sees her the same way, they both agree that it sucks. Laura's phone rings as the others need an answer, but they ignore it and Jubilee tells Laura to go and have some fun and dance. Laura explains that she cannot dance, but Jubilee tells her it does not matter because she is hot. Laura tells her she is not hot. However, as they go, someone follows them. While Jubilee was dancing, Laura becomes distracted by looking at someone and recognized him as the person who took over Zebra Daddy's operation. She and Jubilee attack him and his men and take the girl who was with him since she knew where the other girls were and how to free them. As they think about what to do with the girls, because they cannot just call the police, the Black Widow and some S.H.I.E.L.D. agents appear and take the girls to help them. Natasha offers Laura to come to the Avengers Academy and she accepts. The next day she tells Logan what happened, and Wolverine tells her he is going to miss her and he is sorry he could not do better by her. She tells him she is going to miss him too, then she takes a motorcycle and drives to the academy.

==== Avengers Academy ====
Following the "Fear Itself" storyline, Laura appears as one of the students at the new Avengers Academy. The academy sees she does not need any combat training after she fought Tigra. After she introduced herself to the other students, she explained to Mettle the difference between killing an innocent and killing to protect an innocent, telling him that he is not a psycho killer, and that they can talk more about it another time. This makes Hazmat feel jealous. Finesse became friends with Laura due to their lack of emotion. Finesse also stood by Laura when she opposed the X-Men locking their students on the academy grounds during Avengers vs. X-Men. However, their friendship took a turn for the worse when Jeremy Briggs tried to release a superhuman cure. After Briggs took out Laura and tried to acid burn her, Finesse grabs Laura's arms and fatally stabs Briggs in the radial and femoral arteries, making him bleed to death. Laura first thought she killed him, but when she finds out it was Finesse, she was furious. Laura agrees to keep Finesse's secret, but declares they are no longer friends, upsetting Finesse.

==== Avengers Arena ====
After Avengers vs. X-Men and the conclusion of Avengers Academy, Laura was part of the students abducted by Arcade in Avengers Arena. Arcade turns them loose for 30 days in Murderworld to fight for survival. In a flash forward, it is shown that on the penultimate day, she attacks Hazmat and is badly burned, but the results are unknown as the flash forward then ends. The academy students set up camp and face off against the Runaways when Chase is framed, but Laura is soon separated from Reptil and Hazmat when Arcade covers the group in trigger scent and Reptil evacuates Hazmat. Laura then finds Juston Seyfert and helps him strip down his Sentinel. After Apex kills Juston and takes his Sentinel, Laura goes to track them and get them back. After nearly being killed by Apex, Arcade unleashes a trigger scent to send Laura in a berserker rage, causing her to injure Hazmat. Cullen Bloodstone turns into his Glartrox form and fights Laura, defeating her and powering her down from her rage. After that, Laura continues to injure Hazmat until Anachronism steps in. Angered over Nara's death and holding Laura responsible, Anachronism attacks Laura, inadvertently saving Hazmat. By this point, most of Laura's body is badly burned with radiation, and she is still in this state when the competition ends and Nico Minoru, Chase, Cammi, Death Locket, and Anachronism call Hank Pym, Abigail Brand, Maria Hill, Captain Britain, and Wolverine to pick up the kids. Laura is loaded onto a S.H.I.E.L.D. helicopter and is taken away to parts unknown, ending her affiliation with the Avengers Academy.

=== All-New X-Men ===
Laura as Wolverine on a variant cover of All-New Wolverine #6. Art by Emanuela Lupacchino.

Unlike the other Arena survivors, Laura did not join the group in infiltrating the Masters of Evil in Bagalia. After the events of Avengers Arena, Laura is found by Kitty Pryde and the time-displaced original X-Men. She is amnesiac and being hunted by the Purifiers.

After being found by Kitty, Laura was taken to their base to recover. When Laura wakes up, with her memories now returning, at the former Weapon X facility she immediately tries to escape. Teen Cyclops goes to talk to her, while he is gone Teen Jean mentions to the team that Teen Cyclops "fancies" Laura. As Laura makes it outside she's met by Teen Cyclops, who was waiting for her. Teen Cyclops tries to calm her down but Laura only ceases hostility after getting Teen Cyclops scent and figuring out that Teen Cyclops is who he says he is.

The two talk, with Laura telling him that she does not want to talk about her past or what happened to her. Suddenly Teen Cyclops awkwardly hugs her, when she was distracted and looking sad, because he thought she needed a hug. Laura tells him that she does not do hugs, especially not with an audience as Kitty, Teen Jean, and Teen Beast were watching them. Teen Jean expressed a very conflicted look upon her face due to the hug and having read part of Laura's mind, thus she knows what happened in Avengers Arena. Laura thanks them for helping her and suggests they take the fight to the Purifiers, but in order for her to track them down, they will have to return her to where they found her.

Upon finding the Purifier base they immediately set out to attack them. However, the fight does not go well and the entire team is knocked unconscious by Stryker Jr. when Teen Jean learns too late that Stryker Jr. has powers of his own. Laura is also with the All-New X-Men when Teen Jean is abducted by the Shi'ar and the X-Men team up with the Guardians of the Galaxy to save her. Later, she is attacked by Raze, who disguises himself as her to infiltrate Cyclops's base. She subsequently begins to date the younger Angel, and meets Jimmy Hudson—the son of the Wolverine of the Ultimate Marvel universe—when the team are transferred into the Ultimate Universe by accident. She and the All-New X-Men team up again with the Guardians of the Galaxy in search of The Black Vortex, during which Angel submits himself to the Vortex and almost dies, but instead is granted golden light wings. She asks him why he endangered himself, and he tells her that he wanted to change himself so he will not turn into Archangel and that he can stay himself forever since he is in love with her.

=== All-New Wolverine ===
The series opens approximately eight months after "Secret Wars", and reveals that her healing factor is working normally again after having been drained by Siphon in the Nexus of All Realities.

Laura later discovers that Robert Chandler of Alchemax Genetics had made three clones of her named Bellona, Gabby, and Zelda who did not manifest the same mutation as her. This led to a fight with Alchemax Genetics, during which Bellona escapes, Gabby is taken in by X-23, and Zelda is killed.

=== The Hunt for Wolverine ===
During the Hunt for Wolverine storyline, Laura attends a disguised black market auction in a submarine off the coast of Guam. After a disguised Tony Stark wins the genetic material of Luke Cage and Jessica Jones' daughter Danielle Cage in the auction, she advises Tony Stark to drop out of the auction afterwards. When the unidentified seller of the genetic material meets with Tony Stark, he is attacked by Mister Sinister for stealing the genetic material of the original Wolverine. Laura sheds her disguise and assists Iron Man in fighting Sinister, slicing off Sinister's left hand. Iron Man finds information in Sinister's database which reveals that part of her genetic material was provided by Sarah Kinney, the scientist who created her and carried her to term. This makes her the biological daughter of both Sarah and Logan, and not strictly just a clone.

=== X-Men Red ===
Laura and her sister Gabby Kinney appeared as members of Jean Grey's X-Men Red team.

=== X-23 (Volume 4) ===
Laura returns to the X-23 codename as she, her sister Gabby, and their pet Jonathan go on an adventure to prevent others from being experimented on.

=== Krakoan Age ===
Laura as Talon in her Hellfire Gala (2023) outfit on the variant cover of Wolverine (vol. 7) #35 by artist Mahmud Arsar.

Laura (back to her Wolverine moniker, now shared with her father figure) and Gabby moved to the mutant island-nation of Krakoa, starting a new chapter in their life alongside Logan and Akihiro. During the Fallen Angels (vol. 2) storyline, Laura Kinney joins young Cable and Kwannon on a hunt to find the evil Japanese spirit Apoth that is attacking mutants.

Laura, alongside Synch and Darwin, were tasked to venture into The Vault, as their powers assures their chances of surviving the temporal disparity created by said place. As soon as the three entered the Vault, they lost contact with the X-Men, and because time moved much quicker inside the Vault, the trio were stuck within for centuries. Confirming their assumptions, the trio went on to survive as centuries went on, fighting different iterations of the Children of the Vault and growing close to Synch, until Darwin got captured and experimented upon by the Vault's artificial intelligence in order to create an evolved batch of the Children, forcing Laura to sacrifice herself to give Synch enough time to escape and reach Xavier. With her status in doubt, Laura was revived by The Five without her memories of her time inside the Vault or the relationship developed between herself and Synch, who still had his memories intact. During the inaugural Hellfire Gala X-Men elections, both Laura and Synch were selected to join the team. There are some awkward encounters between the two because Laura is aware of the missing memories and relationship Synch had with the original version of her. At the next Hellfire Gala, Laura decides to leave the X-Men team.

It remained unknown to anyone that the newly-resurrected Laura was a duplicate, as the original Laura was not killed but instead captured and kept alive by the Children inside the Vault. Forge eventually discovered her on a rescue mission and took her back to Krakoa, where she was reunited with Synch. Afterwards, she moved with him into the X-Men's Treehouse in New York City. After some spending some time together with Synch, they went for a talk with the younger Laura whom until then everyone presumed to be the original in order to set up some rules for their now shared existence: the younger Laura forfeited her resurrection rights to the older Laura but insisted that she would keep the name "Wolverine". The older Laura agreed but warned that she was not looking for future socializing or even encounters between them. She then adopted her old codename "Talon" and begun serving with the X-Men, while the younger Laura joined X-Force.

During the Fall of X storyline, Talon and Synch would go on to lead the X-Men while they were part of the mutant resistance following the attack on Krakoa by Orchis. Talon and Synch successfully steal technology to nullify Orchis' poisoned medicine from the High Evolutionary, however, he retaliates and disintegrates Talon's body. Synch initially is able to support a psychic imprint of Talon's mind that he can communicate with but without a way to download it into a new body, there is no way to bring Talon back to life. The Talon in Synch's mind convinces him to let her go so that he has the power to fight Nimrod. Meanwhile, Wolverine has been similarly driven underground due to Orchis's attack and reunites with Logan, Fang (formally Daken), Aurora, Northstar and others at X-Force's new Arctic base. While outside of the base, Fang is ambushed and brutally killed by Sabretooth and his multiversal selves, which kicks off the Sabretooth War storyline. After the Sabretooth Army is driven away from the Arctic Base but manage to slaughter many of its inhabitants and abduct Laura, Logan falls into despair and Aurora mourns Fang's death, which is rendered permanent as Krakoa's Resurrection Protocols are no longer an option. Later in the conflict, during Sabretooth's absence, Laura escapes and kills the Savage Sabretooth before sending a distress signal to X-Force. Fang's death is avenged when Logan kills Sabretooth at the end of the conflict.

When Sync later teams up with Wolverine, they take a moment to grieve the loss of Talon.

=== From the Ashes ===
In the post-Krakoan Age, the surviving Laura (codenamed Wolverine) is now a hero in Brooklyn focused on "saving mutants from harm on the streets of Bushwick", starring in NYX. Laura attempts to warn off Kamala Khan, who as Ms. Marvel is investigating the anti-mutant bigot group called Truthseekers, since she believes Kamala is inexperienced in dealing with anti-mutant violence. Meanwhile, Wolverine investigates a criminal organization led by Mr. Friend, who is revealed to be Mojo, and is injured in the ensuing confrontation. The Krakoan attacks the Truthseekers who are saved by Ms. Marvel; the Krakoan is later revealed to be Julian Keller. Julian, along with Empath and the other Stepford Cuckoos, forms a new Quiet Council aiming to turn New York into a haven for mutants. The Truthseekers, secretly a front for the Purifiers, start protesting against the mutant presence while the New York City Council votes on a bill to relocate mutants into ghettos. The NYX mutants rally and organize a counterprotest with their allies. The council votes against the bill, and the Truthseekers are forced to stand down. Kiden Nixon emerges from her timestream to help Laura and her friends prevent Mojo's technopathic lieutenant Local from hijacking a Dazzler concert. While en route to Graymalkin Prison, the prison convoy escorting Julian is ambushed by Laura, Sophie and Kiden to rescue him. Although Julian is initially refuses to be rescued and is unrepentant for his actions as the Krakoan, he changes his mind after an emotional talk with Laura and leaves with the group. Later on, Mojo uses the last seed of Krakoa to transform New York into Mojo City; however, Laura, the other NYX mutants, and their allies break Mojo's influence over the city and defeat him.

She also headlines in Laura Kinney: Wolverine where she has decided to protect mutants on her own and follows up on hidden pleas for help that were inside the Krakoa Treehouse in New York City. Laura initially teams up with Elektra Natchios (as Daredevil) in Hell's Kitchen to investigate and stop the anti-mutant militia called Humanity First. While recovering in a safe house, Bucky Barnes (as Revolution) shows up which leads to a team-up as the two go on a cross-country trip to deal with a Hydra plot.

== Powers and abilities ==
Laura was apparently a female clone (later revealed as his biological daughter) created from Wolverine's genetic material. Consequently, her mutant powers are similar to his. Like Wolverine, Laura's primary mutant ability is an accelerated healing factor that allows her to regenerate damaged or destroyed tissues with far greater speed, efficiency, and finality than ordinary humans are capable of. Injuries such as gunshot wounds, slashes, and puncture wounds completely heal within a matter of seconds. She has also been shown to be able to reattach limbs; for example, she reattached her hand after she severed it to escape the restraints placed on her by Kimura. The effects of her accelerated healing powers extend to her body's immune system, rendering her immune to disease and infection. She is also immune to most drugs and toxins, although she can be affected by certain drugs if given sufficient dosage. Given the regenerative nature of her cells, she is potentially biologically immortal, just like her father.

Laura's mutant healing factor heightened her physical senses, speed, agility, reflexes/reactions, balance, and endurance to superhuman levels. Like Wolverine, Laura possesses retractable claws sheathed within her forearms. She releases the claws through the tissue of her knuckles, leaving small wounds which are healed by her healing factor. Unlike Wolverine, however, Laura has only two claws per hand which are her primary weapons of offence. She also has a single, retractable claw within each foot which she tends to use for defense. The claws were forcefully extracted by Zander Rice, sharpened, coated with adamantium, and reinserted into her body. Laura escaped before the procedure to fuse her entire skeleton with adamantium could be performed. Since the claws are laced with adamantium, they are virtually unbreakable and are capable of cutting almost any substance.

In addition to her own innate powers and skills, Laura has twice been the host of the Enigma Force, providing her with many special abilities particular to the entity. She is the first mutant to be chosen by the entity as its host, as well as being one of a handful of individuals to do so more than once. At the end of their second encounter, the Enigma Force named Laura as the heir to its power. This permanent association was first indicated by a mark appearing on the palm of her right hand at the conclusion of the "Killing Dream" arc of her solo series.

Born and raised in captivity, Laura has been trained to become a living weapon. She is highly trained in the use of long range weapons and explosives and is a formidable hand-to-hand combatant, with intensive training in numerous armed and unarmed martial arts techniques. She has also been subjected to conditioning in which a specific "trigger scent" has been used to send her into a berserker rage, killing anything in sight; Emma Frost is unsure if this will ever be fully suppressed. She has displayed fluency in French and Japanese, and Zander Rice once described her intellect as being "off the charts".

== Relationships ==
=== Wolverine ===
Laura and Logan talk and interact with each other in ways that are consistent with a father-daughter relationship (even though in New X-Men, Logan introduced her to the students as his sister). Logan acts protectively towards Laura and seems to have her well-being at heart, such as when he openly voiced his disapproval of Cyclops putting her on X-Force; he, however, did not force her to leave, though he told Gambit that he thinks he should have. When the pair first meet, Logan offers to help her start over at the Xavier Institute and says that he knows better than anyone what she is going through. Iron Man's recent research confirmed that Logan is actually Laura's biological father, rather than just being a female clone of Logan. After Logan's death, Laura officially adopts his codename of 'Wolverine' to honor his memory.

=== Sarah Kinney ===
Sarah was the first one to show Laura any sort of affection in spite of her orders from the Facility to not treat her like a child. Sarah would frequently read her Pinocchio as a child and showed concern when she noticed the cuts Laura inflicted on herself. It took Laura sparing the life of Henry Sutter for Sarah to realize that she was just as guilty of using Laura as the rest of the Facility was. Deciding to make things right, Sarah hatched a plan to escape with Laura, destroy the Facility's work, and start over with her. However, thanks to Zander Rice lacing the trigger scent on her, Sarah was killed by Laura. With her dying breaths, Sarah tells "X-23" her name is Laura. Sarah's final thoughts were left in a letter to Laura detailing her guilt, that she was Laura's mother, and the realization that she had come to love her. Sarah's death remains to this day the life that Laura regrets taking the most. Iron Man's research confirmed that Sarah is actually Laura's biological mother, rather than just being a surrogate. Writer Marjorie Liu has stated that she intended for Laura to be part Asian through her mother.

=== Megan Kinney ===
Laura's cousin on her mother's side. After escaping from the Facility Laura moved in with Sarah's sister Debbie and her daughter Megan. For a time the two connected and Megan even admitted to Laura being her best friend. However, when Facility agents came to take Laura back, Laura helped them escape and make new identities so that they could hide. Laura and Megan then went their separate ways and have not heard from each other since, though Megan remains one of the people closest to Laura's heart. In the 18th issue of All-New Wolverine, after killing Kimura by drowning her, Laura finds Megan's hideout and says they (Megan and Debbie) do not have to hide anymore.

=== Kiden Nixon ===
Kiden, a homeless mutant from New York City, met Laura when she was a prostitute under the pimp Zebra Daddy. Kiden helped Laura to escape from her life as a prostitute and quickly befriended her though at this point Laura had difficulty speaking. Laura recounts in the X-23 One Shot that Kiden and her friends did not know or care that she was a weapon. To them, Laura was their friend and part of their gang. Laura parts ways with them at the end of the one shot, returning with Wolverine. They leave on good terms, and Kiden says that Laura will always have a place with them.

=== Hellion ===
The first boy that Laura formed a crush on. At first Hellion was hostile towards her, but during the Mercury Rising arc the two grew closer. Mercury managed to pick up on Laura's feelings towards him though she did not get Laura to admit to it. Over time Hellion/Julian began to feel the same way, and their relationship became more serious. When Julian lost his hands during Second Coming, Laura stayed by him, watching him recover. After the Misadventures in Babysitting arc, Laura ended things between her and Julian saying that she no longer felt the same way towards him. However, in an illusionary world created by Beautiful Dreamer in which the X-Men were a story written by Laura, she and Julian were in a serious relationship in which he proposed marriage. Despite her protests it wasn't the life she wanted, Dreamer revealed the illusion was crafted from her own desires, leaving Laura wondering whether she still has feelings for him.

Ashley Fields, for Screen Rant in 2025, noted that NYX (vol. 2) #8 reminds "fans of Hellion's incredible impact on Wolverine's life" and that the issue "offers a solid look back at her and Hellion's past, but a couple of pages isn't quite enough to capture everything they meant to one another". Fields highlighted that when Laura joined "the Academy X class of students, she wasn't exactly met with a wealth of support. She was met with fear and suspicion, and Hellion stepped up as one of the first people to see beyond that". Fields commented that while their history "is hardly all roses", this issue showcases Laura's personal growth and puts the two characters on "a clear path toward building a new friendship". Stephanie Burt, in a review of the issue for ComicsXF, similarly highlighted the personal growth of both characters – "Laura gradually becoming a person and not just a weapon, Julian learning how his anger shapes him but need not control him, both of them figuring out how whatever kissy-face tension once brought them together belongs in the past, but the loyalty they developed for each other … maybe that holds right now".

=== Gambit ===
Gambit traveled with Laura during the X-23 solo series. The two became friends and looked out for one another as Gambit helped her to cope with the changes in her life as well as giving her helpful life advice. He affectionately referred to her as "Petite" and even managed to get her to calm down from a trigger scent-induced rage. Gambit scolded Logan for not protecting Laura the way he protected Jubilee, to which Logan admitted to his failings as Laura's father. Gambit also went on to remark that Laura, while damaged, was far from being broken, contrary to everyone's perceptions of her. If Laura was truly broken she would not be trying to change. Logan later on thanked Gambit for succeeding with Laura where he failed. When Laura left to join to the Avengers Academy, she and Gambit shared a goodbye hug and he told her wherever she went she was not alone.

=== Jubilee ===
During the Touching Darkness arc of the X-23 series, Gambit had Wolverine come by to help Laura. Logan had brought Jubilee with him and Laura attacked her on sight due to her being a vampire. Though after getting some space between the two girls things managed to calm down. Laura had some jealousy towards Jubilee from the X-23 one shot as Logan treated her more like a daughter than he did her. Laura tried to bait Jubilee into killing her by slicing her neck open and counting on her bloodlust, though Jubilee managed to stop herself after witnessing one of Laura's memories. After talking things out, the two realized how much alike they were and became friends.

=== Daken ===
Logan/Wolverine's son and the closest thing Laura has to a brother. Daken is to Laura what Sabretooth is to Wolverine, her opposite. Even though Laura admits that she and Daken are related by blood, the two do not initially see each other as family. Laura had fought with Daken when the Dark Avengers under Norman Osborn invaded Utopia. They did not truly meet until Laura and Gambit came to Madripoor looking to track down Malcolm Colcord. At first Daken does not believe that she is a clone of his father, until Laura reveals her claws. Daken berates her for coming to Madripoor and remarks that they are nothing alike. The two square off until Daken decides to offer his assistance, which Laura rejects. When Daken confronts Colcord about his plans to restart Weapon X, he reveals his subterfuge at leading Laura and Gambit to Colcord, though this turns out be a ruse as well, as he incapacitates Gambit and helps Colcord capture Laura. Daken learns about Laura's past from Colcord and assists in her escape from her cell. He remarks that Laura is a construct, to which Laura retorts that he is just like her: Just like the Facility made Laura into a weapon, so did Romulus do to Daken, to which he responds that he owns his own fate. The two then enter a brief mutual alliance to destroy Colcord's new project. Before they part ways, Daken asks Laura why she does not seek power when she could easily have it. Laura remarks that what she has to prove has nothing to do with power, and then asks Daken why he seeks more power when he already has it. Daken remarks that power is all he has. Laura's encounter with Daken makes her realize that she owns her fate and can do with it what she wants. Daken does not seem to have the same hate towards Laura that he does with Logan, and by the time of later series such as Wolverines, he even begins to demonstrate affection towards her. In Reign of X and later stories, he actively refers to Laura as his sister along with Gabby.

=== Angel ===
Prior to the Secret Wars storyline, Laura began a relationship with the time-displaced teenaged Warren Worthington III, which persisted after she took on the Wolverine codename. However, Warren clashed with her several times about her increasing recklessness. Following a brutal beating she received from Blob, he decided to end the relationship to make a point about the unnecessary risks she was taking. The two, however, reconciled after having come to understand each other's feelings.

=== Psylocke (Betsy Braddock) ===
Laura and Psylocke became quite friendly with each other on their first meeting in The Uncanny X-Men #456, shortly after Psylocke came back to life. Both girls seemed to share an enjoyment in fighting. In one instance, Laura was knocked out while Psylocke continued, upon awakening Laura saw all the enemies had disappeared and when she asked Psylocke what happened, Betsy joked that she ate them, to which Laura replied it was cool. Another shared moment was when Betsy and Laura discussed her coming back to life, which Laura did not see as unique since she herself had died repeatedly when she was experimented on to test her healing factor, but she always "got better". When Psylocke asked how that made her feel, Laura smiled and said she killed them, and they did not get better. Betsy then smiled and wrapped her arm around Laura's shoulder, saying she had some very definite possibilities. There have also been images of Laura imitating Betsy, including braiding her hair and mimicking her poses.

=== Gabby Kinney ===
In the first arc of All-New Wolverine Laura learned that Alchemax genetics had created ten clones of her. All but four of the clones died in captivity, either during training or as a result of tests of a nanotech weapon that was slowly breaking down their bodies. Two others died during the escape; one who committed suicide after Laura foiled her attempt to assassinate Robert Chandler's son, and a second killed by Chandler's lead enforcer. The last two Sisters — Gabby and Bellona — survived. Laura took Gabby in and adopted her as her sister, taking it upon herself to give her the family Laura herself never had with Logan, in hopes of helping her find the right path. Much like Laura, Gabby possesses a regenerative healing factor and bone claws, however she only has a single claw in each hand. Additionally, as a result of the nanites in her blood Gabby does not feel pain. She eventually adopted a super-hero code name Honey Badger that was given by her brother Daken. She eventually gave the name up to become Scout.

=== Synch ===
During the Krakoan Age, Laura along with Synch and Darwin spent centuries in The Vault where Laura and Synch eventually developed a romantic relationship. Laura presumably dies after sacrificing herself to give Synch enough time to escape The Vault and reach Xavier. Laura was then revived by The Five without her memories of her time spent in The Vault with Synch. It is later revealed that the original Laura was kept alive by the Children of the Vault when Forge goes to rescue Darwin. Synch and Laura are reunited and move into the X-Men's Treehouse in New York City together. They join the X-Men roster with Laura now going by the codename Talon while Laura's younger duplicate, keeping the Wolverine codename, shifts to X-Force. When the High Evolutionary disintegrates Talon's body, Synch is initially able to support and communicate with a psychic imprint of Talon's mind. However, this occurs after the fall of Krakoa, so there is no way to physically resurrect this version of Laura. Laura convinces Synch to relinquish the strain on his powers and let her imprint go so that he can fight Nimrod. Alex Schlesinger, for Screen Rant in 2022, called their reunion "a truly heartwarming one, with the intense and ancient love between Everett and Laura on full display, but because this is happening in an X-Men comic fans of the couple shouldn't get too hopeful, as the future of this tragic romance is still yet to be revealed". Following the death of Talon's body in X-Men #30 (January 2024), Robert Wood of Screen Rant commented that "Synch and Laura's relationship has been filled with heartache and tragedy, and this final twist of the knife confirms things will get worse before they get better – if they ever do". Jonathan Jones of AIPT highlighted the "ominous" use of The Lovers tarot card in the issue as Laura only remains alive as an imprint within Synch's mind – "The Lovers is a card of choice, sacrifices made for or at the cost of relationships; a test that impacts the partners' ability to remain in sync". Jones, in his review of X-Men #31 for AIPT, felt the "emotional beats" of Laura and Synch's final conversation was a bit empty and that the creative team's focus was on addressing the problem of Talon existence as a character. Jones opined that the arc of their relationship "has ended for the time being, and in the end, it served no one, developed no one, and has not left a lasting impact on the story moving forward. On top of that, the majority of their romance before and after the Vault took place off-panel, making it even harder for readers to find a reason to care"; however, Jones was more positive about artist Phil Noto's portrayal of the characters in the issue as "even if readers don’t especially care about Talon and Synch's relationship, the emotional subtleties in their faces are worth a look through. Everett's heartbreak hits even harder as he rises stone-faced against Nimrod while syncing Storm's powers".

== Reception and legacy ==
=== Critical reception ===
Jamie Lovett of ComicBook.com stated, "X-23 is one a great handful of crossover characters who began in animation and were so well-liked by fans that they eventually made their way into comics. [...] Through the mentorship of Logan himself and the friendship of characters like Gambit, Jubilee, Angel, and her Laura's own clone, Gabby, Laura has become a fully fleshed out character in control of her own destiny. When Logan died, X-23 mourned. When she was done mourning, she did what now seems like what she was alway destined to do. She became Wolverine, and she fills that role as well as her predecessor, if not better at times." David Harth of CBR.com wrote, "Known for years as X-23, she proved herself on the hero scene before taking over as Wolverine after Logan's death. She proved to be amazing at it and has since become Wolverine again, working with the X-Men. Fans have watched Wolverine grow for years, evolving from a lab created killing machine to a well-rounded human being. She's gained a legion of fans since then and stepped onto the biggest mutant stage and impressed." Maddy Myers of The Mary Sue said, "The reason why X-23's story is compelling to me is not because she's a grim-dark teen killing machine, although that did speak to me when I was a depressed teenage girl. These days, her story resonates with me because it ends in self-acceptance and self-actualization. She gets to work with X-Men of various ages, decide which parental and authority figures are worth her trust, make new friends her own age, build a new family of her own with Logan and her "sister" clones, and – the cherry on top – she becomes the Wolverine! It's a triumphant story that has been going on for about a decade, and it would be amazing to bring it to more audiences who aren't as familiar with." Andy L. Kubai of Screen Rant asserted, "One of the most interesting characters to arrive since the original James Howlett is Laura Kinney, a.k.a. X-23. A female clone of Logan, she's a Wolverine through and through, who first came to light via the short-lived animated series, X-Men: Evolution (2000). Creators Christopher Yost and Craig Kyle sought to capture younger viewers with a teenaged "Wolverine", and they succeeded. Laura snowballed in popularity, transitioning into the comic book realm in 2004 and landing several limited series and team books (like X-Force and New X-Men), as well as a current ongoing series."

=== Accolades ===
- In 2015, Entertainment Weekly ranked Laura Kinney 70th in their "Let's rank every X-Man ever" list.
- In 2017, ComicBook.com ranked Laura Kinney 2nd in their "Every Wolverine In The Marvel Universe Ranked" list.
- In 2018, CBR.com ranked Laura Kinney 3rd in their "20 Deadliest X-Men Clones" list, 7th in their "X-Force: 20 Powerful Members Ranked From Weakest To Strongest" list, and 6th in their "15 Most Lethal Weapon X Members" list.
- In 2018, CBR.com ranked X-23 15th in their "8 X-Men Kids Cooler Than Their Parents (And 7 Who Are Way Worse)" list.
- In 2018, CBR.com ranked X-23 7th in their "X-Force: 20 Powerful Members" list.
- In 2019, CNET ranked Laura Kinney 4th in their "Female Marvel superheroes who deserve their own shows" list.
- In 2020, Scary Mommy included Laura Kinney in their "Looking For A Role Model? These 195+ Marvel Female Characters Are Truly Heroic" list.
- In 2021, Screen Rant ranked Laura Kinney 7th in their "10 Most Powerful Members Of X-Force" list.
- In 2022, Sportskeeda ranked Laura Kinney 1st in their "5 best alternate versions of Wolverine" list.
- In 2022, Screen Rant ranked Laura Kinney 5th in their "Top 10 X-Men, Ranked by Fighting Skills" list and included her in their "10 Most Powerful Versions Of Wolverine" list.
- In 2022, CBR.com ranked Laura Kinney 2nd in their "10 Best Marvel Legacy Heroes" list, 2nd in their "Wolverine's Children, Ranked By Likeability" list, and 10th in their "10 Most Powerful Female X-Men" list.

== Literary reception ==
=== X-23 (2005) ===
In 2005, Marvel Comics announced that X-23 #1 sold out.

=== All-New Wolverine (2015) ===
According to Diamond Comic Distributors, All-New Wolverine #1 was the 10th best selling comic book in November 2015.

Matt Little of CBR.com called All-New Wolverine #1 a "fresh take on the legacy of 'Wolverine' that fans will enjoy", asserting, "All-New Wolverine #1 is a good Wolverine comic; it's full of explosions and slashing and punching, the kind of stuff you want when you say to yourself, "Hey, I want to read a Wolverine comic." Tom Taylor, who's made a name for himself with mad violent stories like DC's "Injustice: Gods Among Us", knows how to ratchet up tension and deliver a high caliber action sequence, which is what you get in the first issue. It's a set piece that throws readers right into the middle of the action and catches them up as they go. David Lopez delivers more of his open, expressive art here, filling the issue with awesome choreography and rad character acting. [...] All-New Wolverine is a worthy successor to the franchise. It blends the familiar and the fresh with style and keeps fans engaged the entire issue. Congratulations, Laura; you're earning the codename "Wolverine". Jesse Schedeen of IGN gave All-New Wolverine #1 a grade of 8.5, saying, "As much as this series is new in the sense that a completely different character is calling herself Wolverine, the book also reads like a return to basics. This issue is a solid start to a promising new series. [...] The Wolverine franchise has finally found its bearing, and all it took was a completely new character underneath that distinctive mask. This first issue is lean and fast-paced, tossing readers right into the heat of battle and proving the former X-23 worthy of inheriting the mantle of Wolverine." Chase Magnett of ComicBook.com included the All-New Wolverine comic book series in their "10 Best X-23 Comics" list.

=== X-23 (2018) ===
According to Diamond Comic Distributors, X-23 #1 was the 9th best selling comic book in July 2018.

Joshua Davison of Bleeding Cool stated, "The comic has some good emotional beats to it as well, and, on the whole, it is an excellent continuation of the All-New Wolverine title. [...] X-23 #1 was a promising and thoroughly entertaining new start to for Laura and Gabby Kinney. Their dialogue is wonderful, and this first arc seems like it will be an interesting dive into the characters and their ethos. This one earns a recommendation. Give it a read." Jesse Schedeen of IGN gave X-23 #1 a grade of 8.2 out of 10, writing, "Of the many comics revealed as part of Marvel's Fresh Start relaunch, X-23 seemed the least appealing at first glance. Not because of the character herself or the creative team, but the title and what it implies about the character's future. These past few years have been a boon to Laura Kinney, allowing her to rise above her tragic origins and embrace the legacy of her "father". [...] How well this new series can thrive with the return of Wolverine remains to be seen, but for now X-23 is off to a promising start. The series is hardly the departure from All-new Wolverine it seemed initially, and it thrives on the same keen visual style and strong dynamic between Laura and Gabby." Chase Magnett of ComicBook.com included the X-23 comic book series in their "10 Best X-23 Comics" list.

== Other versions ==
=== Age of Apocalypse ===
An alternate universe version of Laura Kinney named Kirika appears in X-Men: Age of Apocalypse. This version is the biological daughter of Weapon X (Wolverine) and Mariko Yashida who possesses three claws like her father. Having been captured by Mister Sinister and held prisoner in one of his labs, Kirika is later found by Magneto, who grafts adamantium to her claws at her request, before she is killed by Wolverine.

=== Infinity Wars ===
Weapon Hex, an amalgamation of X-23 and the Scarlet Witch, appears in "Infinity Wars". This version was created by the Evolutionaries, an occult and scientific group that had been using and killing mutants in an attempt to find one to serve as a vessel for the demon Mephicton (a fusion of Mephisto and Chthon). Following a string of failures, the group's leaders Sarah Kinney and Herbert Wyndham conceived a flawed child to act as the vessel. However, the former raised Laura with empathy and humanity in mind while the latter sought to weaponize her. After turning 17, Sarah's death, and learning she had a younger sister named Gavrill (a fusion of Quicksilver and Honey Badger), Laura chose to escape with her. She would eventually succeed, killing Herbert in the process.

=== Marvel Team-Up: League of Losers ===
An alternate universe version of Laura Kinney appears in Marvel Team-Up: League of Losers. This version is a member of the eponymous group. After a time-traveling villain called Chronok travels to the present and kills Earth's major heroes, Laura joins the "League of Losers" in their efforts to stop Chronok from stealing Reed Richards' time machine. Along the way, she enters a relationship with teammate Gravity.

=== Old Woman Laura ===
An elderly possible future version of Laura appears in the All-New Wolverine storyline Old Woman Laura. As of this time, she has passed the mantle of Wolverine to Gabby and learned she will die of a genetic defect.

=== Venomverse ===
An alternate universe version of X-23 who bonded to the Venom symbiote while escaping Weapon X appears in the Venomverse series Edge of Venomverse.

=== X-Men: The End ===
An adult possible future version of Laura appears in X-Men: The End. As of this time, she has joined the X-Men and the X-Treme Sanctions Executive (XSE), became a cyborg, and displays romantic attraction towards Fantomex.

=== Age of Revelation ===
The Age of Revelation event involves a dark future and features a new mutant utopia led by Apocalypse's heir Doug Ramsey, under his new name of Revelation, whom Laura works for. She operates as Sabretooth to honor the memory of Sabretooth's son Zane Creed. She and Zane have a son named Alex. Laura enlists Akihiro and Gabby to smuggle Alex out of the Revelation Territories.

== In other media ==
=== Television ===
- Laura Kinney / X-23 appears in Wolverine and the X-Men, voiced by Tara Strong. Introduced in the episode "Stolen Lives", this version is mute and displays a desire to fight Wolverine. In a possible future depicted in the three-part series finale "Foresight", Wolverine finds four clones frozen in a Weapon X facility and awakens them to help him and Professor X defeat a group of Sentinels.
- Laura Kinney / X-23 makes a non-speaking cameo appearance in The Super Hero Squad Show episode "Too Many Wolverines!" as a creation of Egghead's.

=== Film ===
Dafne Keen as a 19-years-old X-23 in Deadpool & Wolverine (2024)

- Laura Kinney / X-23 makes a cameo appearance in Hulk vs. Wolverine as an infant within a Weapon X research facility.
- Laura / X-23 appears in Logan, portrayed by Dafne Keen. In February 2017, producer Simon Kinberg stated that the post-credits scene of X-Men: Apocalypse, in which the Essex Corporation acquires James "Logan" Howlett / Wolverine's blood, correlates with how the Alkali-Transigen corporation eventually acquires DNA and begins creating clones for use as weapons in Logan. This version is an 11-year-old girl created by Transigen from Logan's DNA who inherited her genetic donor's bone claws and advanced regenerative capabilities. After Transigen creates X-24, an adult clone of Wolverine loyal to them, they attempt to terminate Laura and several mutant children until Transigen nurse Gabriela Lopez helped her escape. With Logan's help, she and the children eventually escape across the border to Canada, though Logan is killed in battle against X-24 before Laura kills the latter in turn.
  - Logan director James Mangold stated that he would like to see Laura appear in a future Logan follow-up, tentatively titled Laura, and that he would like to be involved in one way or another, should that happen. Kinberg also stated that 20th Century Fox's plans for future movies did include the character. On October 24, 2017, Mangold confirmed in an interview with The Hollywood Reporter that a script for a Laura spin-off film was in the works, stating, "We're just working on a script." He had also cited the success of Warner Bros. and DC Films' Wonder Woman as inspiration. It was subsequently announced that Laura Kinney creator Craig Kyle would be involved alongside Mangold. However, in March 2019, after Disney's purchase of Fox, an executive from the latter Emma Watts described The New Mutants as the final film in the X-Men series, which has left the future of the Laura film in doubt.
  - Laura appears in The New Mutants via archive footage from Logan.
  - Laura appears in Deadpool & Wolverine, portrayed again by Keen. Having been sent to the Void by the Time Variance Authority (TVA) following the events of Logan, she joins a resistance movement called "The Others" to fight against the Void's ruler Cassandra Nova. After joining forces with Deadpool and an alternate universe variant of Logan to stop Nova from destroying the multiverse, Laura joins Logan in leaving the Void and meeting Deadpool's friends.

=== Video games ===
- Laura Kinney / X-23 appears as a boss in the Game Boy Advance version of X-Men: The Official Game. This version has no memory of her past and traveled to a facility at Alkali Lake in an attempt to regain her memories. When the X-Men arrive, she believes they are trying to kidnap her and fights them until she is defeated, after which the two parties part ways on good terms.
- Laura Kinney / X-23 appears as a playable character in Marvel vs. Capcom 3: Fate of Two Worlds and Ultimate Marvel vs. Capcom 3, voiced again by Tara Strong. Additionally, her outfit from X-Men: Evolution appears as an alternate DLC costume.
- Laura Kinney / Wolverine appears as an unlockable character in Marvel: Avengers Alliance.
- Laura Kinney appears in Marvel: War of Heroes.
- Laura Kinney makes a minor appearance in Marvel Pinball via Wolverine's table.
- Laura Kinney appears in Marvel Heroes, voiced again by Tara Strong.
- The All-New Wolverine incarnation of Laura Kinney / Wolverine appears as a playable character in Marvel Contest of Champions.
- Laura Kinney / Wolverine appears as a playable character in Marvel Future Fight.
- Laura Kinney / Wolverine appears as a playable character in Marvel Puzzle Quest. Additionally, Weapon Hex and Honey Badger were added in a later update.
- Laura Kinney / X-23 appears as a playable character in Marvel Strike Force.
- Laura Kinney / X-23 appears as a purchasable outfit in Fortnite: Battle Royale.
- Laura Kinney / X-23 appears in Marvel Snap.

== Collected editions ==
Title	Material collected	Pages	Publication Date	ISBN
NYX
NYX: Wannabe	NYX #1–7	208	July 2011	Paperback: 978-0785157403
NYX: The Complete Collection	NYX #1–7 and NYX: No Way Home #1–6	392	July 2016	Paperback: 978-0785195986
NYX X-23: Innocence Lost	NYX #1-7 and X-23 (vol. 1) #1–6	352	November 2005	Paperback: 978-0785118251
Innocence Lost (Volume 1)
X-23: Innocence Lost	X-23 (vol. 1) #1–6	144	April 2006	Paperback: 978-0785115021
Target X (Volume 2)
X-23: Target X	X-23: Target X #1–6	160	August 2007	Paperback: 978-0785119715
Volume 3
X-23, Vol. 1: The Killing Dream	X-23 (vol. 2) #1–6 and material from All-New Wolverine Saga	152	November 2011	Paperback: 978-0785147084
Daken/X-23: Collision	X-23 (vol. 2) #7–9, Daken: Dark Wolverine #5-9 and material from Wolverine: Road To Hell.	200	February 2012	Paperback: 978-0785147084
X-23, Vol. 2: Chaos Theory	X-23 (vol. 2) #10–16	152	July 25, 2012	Paperback: 978-0785147985
X-23, Vol. 3: Don't Look Back	X-23 (vol. 2) #17–21	112	December 2012	Paperback: 978-0785152828
X-23: The Complete Collection Vol. 1	X-23 (vol. 1) #1-6, X-23: Target X #1–6, Captain Universe/X-23 #1, X-23 (2010) one-shot, X-23 (vol. 2) #1-3, and material from X-Men: To Serve and Protect #2	456	August 2016	Paperback: 978-1302901165
X-23: The Complete Collection Vol. 2	X-23 (vol. 2) #4-21, Daken: Dark Wolverine #8–9; material from Wolverine: The Road To Hell #1 and All-New Wolverine Saga	472	December 2016	Paperback: 978-1302901172
All-New, All-Different
All-New Wolverine, Vol. 1: The Four Sisters	All-New Wolverine (vol. 1) #1–6	144	May 24, 2016	Paperback: 978-0785196525
All-New Wolverine, Vol. 2: Civil War II	All-New Wolverine (vol. 1) #7–12	144	November 8, 2016	Paperback: 978-0785196532
All-New Wolverine, Vol. 3: Enemy of the State II	All-New Wolverine (vol. 1) #13–18	136	May 3, 2017	Paperback: 978-1302902902
All-New Wolverine, Vol. 4: Immune	All-New Wolverine (vol. 1) #19–24	136	November 29, 2017	Paperback: 978-1302909352
All-New Wolverine, Vol. 5: Orphans of X	All-New Wolverine (vol. 1) #25–30	112	February 27, 2018	Paperback: 978-1302905613
All-New Wolverine, Vol. 6: Old Woman Laura	All-New Wolverine (vol. 1) #31–35	136	July 24, 2018	Paperback: 978-1302911102
All-New Wolverine by Tom Taylor Omnibus	All-New Wolverine (vol. 1) #1-35, All-New Wolverine Annual #1, Generations: Wolverine & All-New Wolverine #1	862	May 11, 2021	978-1302926441
Volume 4
X-23, Vol. 1: Family Album	X-23 (vol. 3) #1–6	136	January 22, 2019	Paperback: 978-1302913083
X-23, Vol. 2: X-Assassin	X-23 (vol. 3) #7–12	136	August 13, 2019	Paperback: 978-1302916862
Deadly Regenesis
X-23: Deadly Regenesis	X-23: Deadly Regenesis #1–5	128	October 3, 2023	Paperback: 978-1302947200

X-23 Omnibus

Title	Vol.	Years covered	Material collected	Page count	Publication date	ISBN
X-23 Omnibus	1	2005-2012	X-23 (2005) #1–6; X-23: Target X #1–6; X-23 (2010A) #1; X-23 (2010B) #1–21; Captain Universe/X-23 #1; Daken: Dark Wolverine #8–9; material from X-Men: To Serve and Protect #2, Wolverine: The Road to Hell #1, All-New Wolverine Saga	928	June 27, 2023	978-1302951603
