= All-New Wolverine =

Comic book series

- Laura Kinney as Wolverine on a variant cover of All-New Wolverine #1

Publication information
- Publisher: Marvel Comics
- Schedule: Monthly
- Format: Ongoing series
- Genre: Superhero
- Publication date: November 2015 – May 2018

Creative team
- Written by: Tom Taylor
- Artist: David López

Collected editions
- The Four Sisters: ISBN 978-07851-9652-5
- Civil War II: ISBN 978-07851-9653-2
- Enemy of the State II: ISBN 978-13029-0290-2
- Immune: ISBN 978-13029-0935-2
- Orphans of X: ISBN 978-13029-0561-3
- Old Woman Laura: ISBN 978-13029-1110-2

All-New Wolverine is a comic book series published by Marvel Comics that ran between 2015 and 2018 as part of the All-New, All-Different Marvel relaunch. The series was the first to star Logan's clone Laura Kinney (formerly X-23) in the role as Wolverine. The plot introduces Laura's clone sisters, the youngest of which, Gabby, ends up becoming her companion during their adventures.

== Publication history ==
The character Laura Kinney becomes the new Wolverine in the series, succeeding her father Logan after his death, with a new costume resembling the original Wolverine's. The series was written by Tom Taylor with art by David López. The Spider-Gwen storyline Long Distance is a crossover with All-New Wolverine, serving as a loose adaptation of the Ultimate Spider-Man storyline in which Peter Parker and Logan are body-swapped, seeing Spider-Gwen Stacy and Laura be bodyswapped.

The series began being reprinted in the UK in Panini's Wolverine and Deadpool title beginning in August 2016.

== Plot ==
Laura tries to stop an assassination attempt in Paris and discovers the killer is a clone of her that is unable to feel pain. Alchemax contact her and explain that a genetics laboratory has been destroyed by fire and that four clones are on the run. Robert Chandler Director of Genetics explains that the sisters have had advanced security training, but have not developed claws or a healing factor or a conscience like Laura, and they are out for revenge. She agrees to find them but only to protect the innocent. Returning to her apartment in the Bronx Laura finds the younger clone Gabby has come to ask for her help. Gabby has set a small fire in the bedroom and uses the distraction to leave. With some difficulty Laura is able to track Gabby and finds the others hiding out in the sewers. The white haired clone Bellonna shoots Laura before she has a chance to talk. When she awakens Laura realizes that somehow the Alchemax soldiers have also tracked them down. The sisters are out for revenge but Laura insists on no killing, and subdues all the soldiers non-lethally. Out of nowhere the sisters are all shot, and Taskmaster appears. Furious she battles Taskmaster and although he matches her moves she is able to severely maim him. She is surprised to find the sisters are not dead, thanks to the body armor they were wearing. Bellona wants to kill Taskmaster so he cannot follow them but Laura argues against killing, but Zelda shoots him in the kneecaps instead. They escape but again the Alchemax soldiers attack in an explosive car chase, and Laura realizes she has been implanted with a tracker and cuts it out. Laura battles the soldiers giving the sisters time to escape. Laura eventually finds the sisters again, but Zelda is dying because something Alchemax has done is slowly killing them. In need of help but unable to contact her friends because Alchemax is watching Laura turns to Doctor Strange for help. Doctor Strange tries to help them but cannot do anything about the nanotechnology causing the problem. Bellona accidentally unleashes a mystical monster they must fight. Zelda's condition worsens so Strange transports them to Pym Laboratories.

== Reception ==
The series holds an average rating of 7.9 by 234 professional critics on review aggregation website Comic Book Roundup.

== Prints ==
=== Issues ===
Issue	Title	Publication Date	Comic Book Roundup Rating	Estimated Sales to North American Retailers (First Month)
#1	Four Sisters: Part One	November 11, 2015	8.0 by 27 professional critics.	119,786, ranked 10th in North America
#2	Four Sisters: Part Two	November 25, 2015	7.4 by 10 professional critics.	55,634, ranked 34th in North America
#3	Four Sisters: Part Three	December 30, 2015	8.1 by seven professional critics.	50,990, ranked 42nd in North America
#4	Four Sisters: Part Four	January 13, 2016		49,978, ranked 27th in North America
#5	Four Sisters: Part Five	February 10, 2016		43,149, ranked 35th in North America
#6	Four Sisters: Part Six	March 9, 2016		44,668, ranked 36th in North America
#7	Father Lost	April 27, 2016		38,168, ranked 49th in North America
#8	The Box: Part One	May 18, 2016		38,242, ranked 44th in North America
#9	The Box: Part Two	June 1, 2016		43,545, ranked 56th in North America
#10	Destiny: Part One	July 20, 2016		38,579, ranked 66th in North America
#11	Destiny: Part Two	August 17, 2016		40,312, ranked 72nd in North America
#12	Destiny: Part Three	September 21, 2016		35,481, ranked 76th in North America
#13	Enemy of the State II: Part One	October 5, 2016		38,297, ranked 77th in North America
#14	Enemy of the State II: Part Two	November 16, 2016		35,437, ranked 81st in North America
#15	Enemy of the State II: Part Three	December 7, 2016		31,796, ranked 87th in North America
#16	Enemy of the State II: Part Four	January 11, 2017		35,128, ranked 71st in North America
#17	Enemy of the State II: Part Five	February 8, 2017		29,255, ranked 80th in North America
#18	Enemy of the State II: Part Six	March 8, 2017		46,731, ranked 33rd in North America
#19	Immune: Part One	April 5, 2017		57,526, ranked 21st in North America
#20	Immune: Part Two	May 10, 2017		36,573, ranked 55th in North America
#21	Immune: Part Three	June 14, 2017		38,500, ranked 50th in North America
#22	Hive: Part One	July 5, 2017		34,610, ranked 56th in North America
#23	Hive: Part Two	August 9, 2017		27,867, ranked 79th in North America
#24	Hive: Part Three	September 13, 2017		33,140, ranked 68th in North America
#25	Orphans of X: Part One	October 11, 2017		62,286, ranked 23rd in North America
#26	Orphans of X: Part Two	October 25, 2017		28,499, ranked 88th in North America
#27	Orphans of X: Part Three	November 22, 2017		26,907, ranked 82nd in North America
#28	Orphans of X: Part Four	December 13, 2017		29,512, ranked 52nd in North America
#29	Orphans of X: Part Five	January 17, 2018		25,330, ranked 88th in North America
#30	Orphans of X: Part Six	January 31, 2018		24,933, ranked 92nd in North America
#31	Honey Badger & Deadpool	February 28, 2018		30,055, ranked 62nd in North America
#32	The Orphans	March 14, 2018		27,586, ranked 72nd in North America
#33	Old Woman Laura: Part 1	April 4, 2018		31,709, ranked 57th in North America
#34	Old Woman Laura: Part 2	April 25, 2018		25,088, ranked 88th in North America
#35	Old Woman Laura: Part 3	May 16, 2018		29,677, ranked 64th in North America

=== Annuals ===
Title	Pages	Cover date	Release date	Comic Book Roundup rating	Estimated sales (first month)	Rated
"All-New Wolverine Annual #1"	40	October 2016	Physical: August 31, 2016; Online: March 6, 2017	7.9 by 9 professional critics.	38,106, ranked 78th in NA	12+

=== Collected editions ===
Title	Material collected	Publication date	ISBN
All-New Wolverine Vol. 1: The Four Sisters	All-New Wolverine #1-6	May 11, 2016	978-0785196525
All-New Wolverine Vol. 2: Civil War II	All-New Wolverine #7-12	October 19, 2016	978-0785196532
All-New Wolverine Vol. 3: Enemy of the State II	All-New Wolverine #13-18	May 3, 2017	978-1302902902
All-New Wolverine Vol. 4: Immune	All-New Wolverine #19-24	November 29, 2017	978-1302909352
All-New Wolverine Vol. 5: Orphans of X	All-New Wolverine #25-30	February 21, 2018	978-1302905613
All-New Wolverine Vol. 6: Old Woman Laura	All-New Wolverine #31-35	July 11, 2018	978-1302911102
All-New Wolverine by Tom Taylor Omnibus	All-New Wolverine #1-35, All-New Wolverine Annual #1, Generations: Wolverine & All-New Wolverine #1	May 11, 2021	978-1302926441
