= Christopher Yost =

American comics and screenwriter (born 1973)

- Born: Christopher Lee Yost; February 21, 1973 (age 53); St. Louis, Missouri, U.S.
- Education: University of Michigan; University of Southern California
- Occupation: Screenwriter
- Years active: 2002–present
- Website: www.instagram.com/versus_yost

Christopher Lee Yost (/joʊst/; born February 21, 1973) is an American film, television, animation, and comic book writer best known for his work for Marvel Studios' Marvel Cinematic Universe with Thor: The Dark World (2013) and Thor: Ragnarok (2017) and on The Mandalorian for Lucasfilm and Disney+.

== Career ==
Yost graduated from the University of Michigan in 1995 with a film and video degree and got into advertising in the Detroit area, producing TV commercials. He went on to earn an MFA in film from The Peter Stark Producing Program at the University of Southern California and later interned, in 2002, in Marvel Comics' west coast office. His spec film scripts got attention from Marvel executives who hired Yost to write episodes of the TV series X-Men: Evolution.

Yost has also written for animated shows such as Teenage Mutant Ninja Turtles, The Batman and was the story editor and head writer on the Fantastic Four animated series that aired on Cartoon Network in 2006 as well as Iron Man: Armored Adventures. He was the head writer of Marvel Animation's The Avengers: Earth's Mightiest Heroes, which aired on Disney XD from 2010 to 2012, and has worked on Lucasfilm's Star Wars Rebels on Disney XD.

Yost worked in the Marvel Feature Film Writers Program from 2010 to 2012 before embarking on his feature film screenwriting career. He was one of the writers of Marvel's feature film Thor: The Dark World (2013), and then wrote Mattel's film Max Steel, before returning to Marvel to work on Thor: Ragnarok.

On June 6, 2017, it was announced that Yost would write an American live-action adaptation of Cowboy Bebop for television with Tomorrow Studios, a partnership between Marty Adelstein and Sunrise Inc., which also produced the original anime. Additionally, he worked on The Mandalorian for Lucasfilm and Disney+. In August 2024, Yost and Alan Wan served as showrunners and executive producers on Tales of the Teenage Mutant Ninja Turtles for Paramount+.

In August 2024, it was announced that Universal International Studios, in collaboration with Seth MacFarlane's Fuzzy Door Productions, acquired the rights to adapt Dungeon Crawler Carl into a television series. Christopher Yost is set to write the series adaptation. Dinniman expressed excitement about the adaptation, while Erica Huggins, President of Fuzzy Door, described the project as aligning with the company's vision for genre-bending storytelling.

== Filmography ==
=== Film ===
- Next Avengers: Heroes of Tomorrow (2008)
- Hulk Vs. (2009)
- Thor: The Dark World (2013)
- Max Steel (2016)
- Thor: Ragnarok (2017)
- Secret Headquarters (2022)
- The Tiger's Apprentice (2024)
- Avatar Aang: The Last Airbender (2026)

=== Television ===
Year	Title	Credit(s)
2003	X-Men: Evolution	Writer (4 episodes)
2004–2005	The Batman	Writer (4 episodes)
2005–2008	Teenage Mutant Ninja Turtles	Writer (14 episodes)
2006	Legend of the Dragon	Writer (episode: "Shell Game")
2006	Alien Racers	Writer (episode: "Skrash and Burn")
2006–2007	Fantastic Four: World's Greatest Heroes	Writer, story editor (4 episodes)
2008–2009	Wolverine and the X-Men	Writer (10 episodes)
2009	Iron Man: Armored Adventures	Writer, story editor (4 episodes)
2010–2012	The Avengers: Earth's Mightiest Heroes	Writer, story editor (15 episodes)
2014	Teenage Mutant Ninja Turtles	Writer (episode: "The Wrath of Tiger Claw")
2016–2018	Star Wars Rebels	Writer (5 episodes)
2019	The Mandalorian	Executive Consultant, writer
2021	Cowboy Bebop	Executive Producer, writer
2023	Star Wars: The Bad Batch	Writer (episode: "Entombed")
2024–2025	Tales of the Teenage Mutant Ninja Turtles	Writer (3 episodes), showrunner
2026	Star Wars: Maul - Shadow Lord	Writer (2 episodes)

== Bibliography ==
=== Comics ===
- Marvel Comics
  - Avengers
    - Avengers: Earth's Mightiest Heroes #1–4 (art by Scott Wegener, 2010–2011)
    - Spider-Island: Avengers #1 (art by Mike McKone, 2011)
    - Avengers Prelude #1–4 (co-written by Eric Pearson, 2012)
    - Marvel Universe Avengers: Earth's Mightiest Heroes #1–7 (2012)
    - AvsX #3 (writer of Black Widow vs. Magik story, 2012)
    - A+X #7 (writer of Thor/Iceman story, 2013)
  - Spider-Man
    - Spider-Man Unlimited Vol. 3 #9 (first story only, with pencils by Drew Johnson, 2005)
    - The Many Loves of The Amazing Spider-Man #1 (Black Cat story only with art by Michael Ryan, 2010)
    - Fear Itself: Spider-Man #1–3 (art by Mike McKone, 2011)
    - Scarlet Spider #1–25 (art by Ryan Stegman, Khoi Pham, 2012–2013)
    - Avenging Spider-Man #15.1–22 (art by Paco Medina, Marco Checchetto, 2013)
    - Superior Spider-Man Team-Up #1–2, 5–8 (2013–2014)
  - X-23
    - X-23: Innocence Lost #1–6 (with co-writer Craig Kyle and art by Billy Tan, 2005)
    - X-23: Target X (with co-writer Craig Kyle and art by Mike Choi, 2007)
  - X-Force
    - X-Force #1–28 (with co-writer Craig Kyle, Marvel Comics, 2008–2010)
    - X-Force/Cable: Messiah War #1 (with co-writer Craig Kyle and art by Mike Choi, 2009)
    - X-Force: Sex and Violence #1–3 (with co-writer Craig Kyle and art by Gabriele Dell'Otto, 2010)
  - X-Men
    - X-Men Unlimited Vol. 2 #11 (first story only, with pencils by Billy Dallas Patton, 2005)
    - New X-Men #20–46 (with co-writer Craig Kyle, 2006–2008)
    - X-Men: Emperor Vulcan #1–5 (with pencils by Paco Diaz and Vincente Cifuentes, 2008)
    - X-Men Origins: Colossus #1 (with pencils by Trevor Hairsine, 2008)
    - X-Men: Divided We Stand #1 (Gentle and Hellion stories only, 2008)
    - X-Men: Worlds Apart #1–4 (art by Diogene Neves, Marvel Comics, 2008–2009)
    - X-Men: Kingbreaker #1–4 (with Dustin Weaver, Marvel Comics, 2008–2009)
    - Dark X-Men: The Confession #1 (with co-writer Craig Kyle and art by Yanick Paquette, 2009)
    - Psylocke #1–4 (art by Harvey Tolibao, 2009–2010)
    - Nation X #1, 3 (#1 Iceman story only; #3 Box & Diamond Lil story only, 2010)
    - X-Men: Second Coming #1–2 (#1 with co-writer Craig Kyle and art by David Finch; #2 with co-writers Matt Fraction, Mike Carey and Zeb Wells and art by Adi Granov, 2010)
    - X-Men: Second Coming – Revelations: Hellbound #1–3 (with Harvey Tolibao, 2010)
    - X-Men: To Serve and Protect #1–4 (X-Vigilante's story only 2010–2011)
    - X-Men Giant Size #1 (First to Last Part 1, art by Paco Medina and Dalibor Talajic, 2011)
    - X-Men #12–15 (First to Last, art by Paco Medina and Dalibor Talajic, 2011)
    - Amazing X-Men #8–12, 14–18 (with co-writer Craig Kyle and art by Ed McGuinness, Carlo Barberi, 2014–2015)
  - Nick Fury
    - Fury's Big Week #1–3 (2012)
  - Other Marvel
    - Wolverine: Killing Made Simple (first story only, with pencils by Koi Turnbull, 2008)
    - Secret Invasion: Runaways/Young Avengers #1–3 (art by Takeshi Miyazawa, 2008)
    - Runaways Vol. 3 #10 (with co-writer James Asmus and art by Sara Pichelli & Emma Rios, Marvel Comics, 2009)
    - Marvel Assistant-Sized Spectacular #2 (writer of the Elsa Bloodstone story, Marvel Comics, 2009)
    - Ender's Game: Battle School #1–5 (art by Pasqual Ferry, 2009)
    - Ender's Game: Command School #1–5 (art by Pasqual Ferry, 2009–2010)
    - Breaking Into Comics the Marvel Way! #1 (X-Men story only with art by Paul Davidson, 2010)
    - Battle Scars #1–6 (art by Scot Eaton, 2011)
    - Point One #1 (art by Ryan Stegman, 2011)
    - New Warriors Vol. 5 #1–12 (with art by Marcus To, 2014)
    - M.O.D.O.K. Assassin #1–5 (art by Amilcar Pinna, 2015)
    - Deadpool: Black, White and Blood #4 (first story only, art by Martin Coccolo, 2021)
    - Kidpool and Spider-Boy (art by Nathan Stockman, Jed Dougherty and Chris Campana, 2024)
- DC Comics
  - Batman: Battle for the Cowl – The Underground #1 (with art by Pablo Raimondi, 2009)
  - Red Robin #1–12 (with art by Ramon Bachs, 2009–2010)
  - Titans #16 (with art by Angel Unzueta, 2009)
  - Batman: Streets of Gotham #5–6 (main feature, with art by Dustin Nguyen, 2009)
- Image Comics
  - Killer of Demons #1–3 (Art by Scott Wegener 2009)
- Vault Comics
  - Unnatural Order #1–4 (Art by Val Rodrigues 2023)
