= Muir Island Saga =

Marvel Comics storyline

- Cover of The Uncanny X-Men 280 (Sept, 1991), art by Jim Lee
- Publisher: Marvel Comics
- Publication date: July – September 1991
- Genre: Superhero; Crossover
Title(s)
The Uncanny X-Men #278-280
X-Factor #69-70
- Main character(s): X-Men; X-Factor

Creative team
- Writer(s): Chris Claremont; Fabian Nicieza; Peter David
- Penciller(s): Paul Smith; Andy Kubert; Whilce Portacio; Kirk Jarvinen; Steven Butler
- Inker(s): Hilary Barta; Scott Williams; Phil Lasorda; Joe Rubinstein
- Letterer(s): Tom Orzechowski; Michael Heisler
- Colorist(s): Joe Rosas; Glynis Oliver; Dana Moreshead; Steve Buccellato
- Editor(s): Tom DeFalco; Bob Harras

The "Muir Island Saga" is a five-part Marvel Comics crossover event involving the X-Men and X-Factor, published in 1991. It was written by Chris Claremont and Fabian Nicieza.

== Plot ==
After warnings from Forge and Banshee, the X-Men and Professor X investigate Muir Island, whose inhabitants have been taken over by the Shadow King. They are captured by the inhabitants. Professor X returns to his mansion, now in ruins after the Inferno storyline, to use Cerebro, only to find Stevie Hunter on the run from Colossus, also controlled by the Shadow King. Professor X battles Colossus and frees him from the Shadow King's control, but he is forced to strip away the Peter Nicholas persona he had been using since passing through the Siege Perilous. Xavier decides to call in his original students, now forming the team X-Factor.

On Muir Island, Wolverine separates himself from his party and is attacked and freed from control by Forge. Rogue appears, ready to attack, but she too is taken out by Forge. The three regroup, but are quickly attacked by Banshee, who is also quickly taken down and freed. Banshee explains that Shadow King has been using Polaris as a nexus between the physical world and the astral plane since the time Zaladane stripped Polaris of her magnetism powers. Using her new powers to absorb negative energy for superhuman strength, Shadow King plans on becoming all-powerful. They fear that to break that connection and defeat him, they may have to kill Polaris.

With X-Factor gathered, Professor X plans a strike on Muir Island using resources provided by Valerie Cooper. X-Factor lands on the island and quickly neutralizes its defenses. Back at the base, Professor X is attacked directly by the Shadow King, using his host body Jacob Reisz, who thinks he has control of all those present, including Cooper. She reveals herself to be a disguised Mystique and kills Reisz. Shadow King quickly shifts to a new host, Legion. As X-Factor and the freed X-Men reach Polaris, Legion sets off an explosion that destroys much of the island.

Professor X lands on the island himself, but finds Legion holding all of his students captive. Legion is attacked unexpectedly by Storm, freeing the X-Men. He retreats and unleashes the X-Men and Muir Island inhabitants to take down his enemies. Professor X decides they must attack the Shadow King on both the physical and astral planes to defeat him, so he sends half the team to break the nexus formed with Polaris and the other half to protect his body while he is on the Astral Plane. He begins his battle with the Shadow King, but now the villain has become too powerful to attack. Jean Grey, finding the damage inflicted to Xavier on the Astral Plane affecting his actual body, brings herself and the accompanying X-Men onto the Plane to assist. In the physical world, Forge defeats the still-controlled Psylocke and uses her psychic knife on Polaris to disrupt and sever the nexus. His power source destroyed, the Shadow King is ripped apart.

In the aftermath, Professor X fails to repair the mental damage to Legion's mind, leaving Legion brain-dead, but is comforted by X-Factor's decision to rejoin the X-Men. Val Cooper, returned from Shadow King's control, recruits Polaris, Guido Carosella and Jamie Madrox into a new government-sponsored team to replace Freedom Force.

== Impact ==
The series had several lasting results for the X-Men family of characters.

- The original X-Factor rejoined the X-Men, causing the team to be split into two separate units.
- Valerie Cooper organized a new X-Factor as a government-sponsored team to replace the recently disbanded Freedom Force.
- Muir Island was greatly damaged, causing many of its longtime inhabitants to vacate.
- Polaris lost her super-strength but regained her magnetic powers.
- Professor X once again lost use of his legs.
- Legion was left in a catatonic state, in which he would remain until the lead-up to "Legion Quest".
- The individual X-Men would abandon the team-uniform costumes for individual costumes once again.
- Colossus was stripped of his Peter Nicholas persona and rejoined the X-Men.

== Publication ==
1. Uncanny X-Men #278
2. Uncanny X-Men #279
3. X-Factor #69
4. Uncanny X-Men #280
5. X-Factor #70

== Collected editions ==
The storyline has been completely or partially reprinted in the following volumes:

- Essential X-Men, Volume 11 (ISBN 0-7851-6684-X)
- Essential X-Factor, Volume 5 (X-Factor #69, #70, Uncanny X-Men #280) (ISBN 0-7851-6353-0)
- X-Men: Legion – Shadow King Rising (Uncanny X-Men #253-255, #278-280; X-Factor #69, #70; The New Mutants #26-28, #44) (ISBN 130290955X)
- X-Men Epic Collection, Volume 19: Mutant Genesis (X-Factor #65-70, Uncanny X-Men #278-280, X-Men #1-3, The New Mutants Annual #7, X-Factor Annual #6, X-Men Annual #15) (ISBN 9781302903916)
