= The Fall of the Mutants =

Comic book crossover event

"Fall of the Mutants"
- Cover to the Fall of the Mutants trade paperback, featuring the art by Alan Davis that advertised the crossover event within various Marvel titles.
- Publisher: Marvel Comics
- Publication date: January – March 1988
- Genre: Superhero; Crossover
Title(s)
The New Mutants #59-61
The Uncanny X-Men #225-227
X-Factor #24-26
Captain America #339
Daredevil #252
Fantastic Four #312
The Incredible Hulk #340
Power Pack #35
What If? #50
Marvel Age #58
- Main character(s): X-Men; X-Factor; New Mutants; Freedom Force; Adversary; Apocalypse; The Right

Creative team
- Writer(s): Chris Claremont; Louise Simonson
- Penciller(s): Marc Silvestri; Walter Simonson; Bret Blevins
- Inker(s): Dan Green; Bob Wiacek; Terry Austin
- Letterer(s): Tom Orzechowski; Joe Rosen
- Colorist(s): Glynis Oliver; Petra Scotese; Bill Wray
- Fall of the Mutants: ISBN 0-7851-0825-4

"The Fall of the Mutants" was a comic book crossover storyline by Marvel Comics spanning January to March 1988. It spanned three issues each of The Uncanny X-Men #225-227, X-Factor #24-26, and New Mutants #59-61; unlike most crossovers however, the various titles' storylines did not intertwine, but were instead linked thematically as each team underwent major ordeals and drastic changes in their status quo.

The 1990 computer game X-Men II: The Fall of the Mutants was based on this storyline.

== Promotion ==
The faux-advertisement for the Mutant Registration Act. The "mutie" is Franklin Richards. Art by Jon Bogdanove.

Marvel Comics used a novel approach in advertising the crossover event. A major element within the stories at the time was the public's growing concern over the "mutant menace" and Robert Kelly's proposed Mutant Registration Act, which foreshadowed the dystopian future shown in "Days of Future Past". Marvel distributed postcard-size mock advertisements supporting the act in comic book stores as well as their various titles cover dated "November 1987". Asking "Do You Know What Your Children Are?", the card further suggested that anyone who knew themselves to be a mutant should fill out the form on the back and mail it in to register themselves with the government.

== Plot summary ==
The Fall of the Mutants consists of three separate non-intersecting storylines: one involving the X-Men, one involving X-Factor, and the other concerning the New Mutants.

=== Uncanny X-Men ===
The X-Men head to Dallas, Texas in search of their missing and de-powered leader Storm, herself seeking the mutant inventor Forge to restore her powers. Upon arrival, they encounter Freedom Force, a government-sanctioned strike team of reformed villains led by Mystique, who are under orders to arrest the X-Men for refusing to comply with the Mutant Registration Act, and a fight ensues. Freedom Force's mutant precognitive Destiny then has a vision: everyone inside a particular Dallas skyscraper at dawn will be dead. Once it begins snowing — in Texas, in the middle of summer — and as cavemen, dinosaurs, and other strange peoples and creatures begin appearing, the two teams realize that something of immense significance is occurring. Calling a temporary truce, they turn to restore order to the chaos engulfing the city. Many of the events are broadcast on television by Neal Conan and Manoli Wetherell, who accompany the X-Men and Freedom Force.

Meanwhile, Storm and Forge find themselves in a pristine, natural world all to themselves. In this new Earth, time proceeds at an accelerated rate, and while only a few moments pass in the main reality, a year does for them. Storm, still hating the man she once loved (as Forge invented the Neutralizer gun that removed her mutant powers), spends most of the year in solitude until she is finally ready to make her peace with him. Forge develops technology — with circuitry sourced from dismantling his bionic arm and leg — enabling him to build a device that restores Storm's weather manipulation powers, and Storm takes to the skies again. Forge uses his shamanic magic in conjunction with her lightning bolts to open a portal back to Dallas.

Time and space meanwhile run amok in the city, as the X-Men and Freedom Force find themselves amidst a scene from the Vietnam War. It is revealed that during his tour of duty, Forge had used his shamanic powers to summon a demon to avenge his fallen comrades. However, in his naiveté, he did not realize that the spell required the souls of his nine comrades and unleashed a horde of demons he had no way to control, including the Adversary, the creature responsible for the chaos they now found themselves in.

As Storm and Forge join the battle, it quickly becomes apparent that the Adversary cannot be defeated, and the only way to be rid of him is for Forge to cast the same spell and seal him away forever. Millions watch the television broadcast (including a horrified Kitty Pryde) as Forge casts the spell, using the souls of the nine X-Men (Storm, Wolverine, Colossus, Longshot, Rogue, Dazzler, Psylocke, Havok, and Madelyne Pryor) to fuel it. As foreseen by Destiny, the X-Men die. However, the goddess Roma, who had also become embroiled in the day's events, takes pity on the X-Men for their noble sacrifice and returns them all to life, additionally commenting to them that as foul and evil as the Adversary is, he should not and cannot be locked away forever, since from the chaos he creates positive change and growth occurs. However, he was bound for an age, which Roma decreed was sufficient punishment for his crime. She additionally made the X-Men invisible to all forms of surveillance save plain sight, thus allowing them to continue with their operations while the world assumes they are dead. Shes does this in the belief that if the world thinks the X-Men are dead they will have the freedom to fight their enemies without the people they cared for being hurt as collateral damage. Before they head to Australia to establish a new base, she gives them the Siege Perilous, telling them they could use it to 'reset' time should they be discovered.

=== X-Factor ===
After completing a mission to rescue their acquaintances, X-Factor (Cyclops, Marvel Girl, Beast, Iceman, and Caliban) is transported to the ship of the villain Apocalypse. Offered a place by his side in his evolutionary war against humans, they refuse, and a battle ensues between X-Factor and his Four Horsemen. The horseman Death then reveals himself to be their former teammate Angel, thought dead and now remade in Apocalypse's image with razor-sharp wings. He quickly defeats the team and they are restrained save for Caliban, who surrenders himself to Apocalypse in return for powers like Death. Apocalypse then unleashes his Horsemen on New York City and tries to force the heroes to watch. They are able to break free of their restraints, and attempt to stop the Horseman from plunging the city further into chaos. In the process, they accidentally damage Apocalypse's airship enough to make it lose control, damaging several skyscrapers as it loses altitude. As the team battles the Horsemen, Iceman comes up with an idea to stop Death, and creates a statue of himself out of ice. Death attacks and breaks the statue and, thinking it is actually Iceman, is overcome with guilt and switches sides, after which Apocalypse causally decides to make a tactical withdrawal and leaves the falling airship: X-Factor, with some help from Power Pack, who had also been working to limit the unleashed chaos, are able bring the vessel down safely, despite it crushing the X-Factor headquarters in the process.

=== The New Mutants ===
The New Mutants (Cannonball, Cypher, Magik, Mirage, Sunspot, Warlock, and Wolfsbane) head off to visit their friend Bird-Brain on his remote island. There, they quickly discover that Bird-Brain's creator, the Ani-Mator, is creating more semi-sentient creatures (the Ani-Mates), which he mistreats and experiments on. As the team attempts to free them, the anti-mutant organization known as The Right tracks them down and attacks. During the three-pronged battle, Cypher is shot and killed, taking a bullet meant for Wolfsbane. Eventually, Bird-Brain defeats the Ani-Mator and becomes king of the Ani-Mates, and Magik teleports the Right's soldiers, along with the Ani-Mator himself, to Limbo. They then return home, where Magneto (headmaster of the Xavier School in Professor X's absence) blames humanity for Cypher's death. Disgusted, the team quits Magneto's tutelage, while deciding to stay dedicated to Professor X's dream of peace.

== Tie-ins ==
While not officially part of the crossover, a number of other Marvel comic books were billed as "Fall of the Mutants" Tie-Ins:

- Captain America #339

As a reward for defeating Marvel Girl, Apocalypse teleports his Horseman Famine to the American midwest to destroy its crops and cattle with her life-draining powers. Steve Rogers (who had at the time given up the uniform of Captain America and was simply operating as "The Captain"), along with allies Nomad, Falcon and D-Man, fight and bring an end to her attack on "America's bread basket".

- Daredevil #252

Apocalypse's attack on New York City brings chaos and looting to its streets, with many citizens thinking a nuclear attack has occurred. Daredevil and the Black Widow do their part to restore order.

- Power Pack #35

The Power Pack become involved in the chaos of Apocalypse's attack on the city and come into conflict with the Horseman Pestilence. Pestilence dies when part of the Empire State Building falls on her, but not before she infects Katie Power. This sickness spreads to her siblings, but the Pack overcome the affliction by initiating their healing talents together.

- Fantastic Four #312

After the ticker-tape parade honoring X-Factor for saving the city from Apocalypse and his Horsemen, the team help the Fantastic Four defeat Doctor Doom.

- The Incredible Hulk (vol. 2) #340

After the X-Men arrive in Dallas, the Hulk attacks Wolverine. The issue does not have the "Fall of the Mutants Tie-In" logo on the cover despite being advertised as such.

== Collected editions ==
The storyline has been collected into a trade paperback:

- Fall of the Mutants (272 pages, February 2002, ISBN 0-7851-0825-4)

It has also been collected into an oversized hardcover:

- X-Men: Fall of the Mutants (824 pages, May 2011, ISBN 0-7851-5312-8)

Collects New Mutants (1983-1991 vol. 1) #55-61, Uncanny X-Men #220-227, X-Factor (1986-1998 vol. 1) #18-26, Captain America (1968-1996 vol. 1) #339, Daredevil (1964-1998 vol. 1) #252, Fantastic Four (1961-1996 vol. 1) #312, Incredible Hulk (1962-1999 vol. 1) #336-337 and 340 and Power Pack (1984-1991 vol. 1) #35

The oversized hardcover has been split into two trade paperbacks:

- X-Men: Fall of the Mutants Vol. 1 (New Mutants #55-61; Uncanny X-Men #220-227; Incredible Hulk #340)
- X-Men: Fall of the Mutants Vol. 2 (X-Factor #18-26, Incredible Hulk #336-337, Power Pack #35, Daredevil #252, Captain America #339, Fantastic Four #312)

It has also been collected as an omnibus:

- X-Men: Fall of the Mutants (817 pages, May 2022, ISBN 978-1302934125)

Collects the same contents as the 2011 oversized hardcover

== In other media ==
- The 2016 film X-Men: Apocalypse is based on the storyline as presented in X-Factor, including the creation of Archangel, Apocalypse's introduction and recruitment of other mutants. However, it is Magneto who is the central horseman, with his story-arc mirroring Warren's.
- The video game: X-Men II: The Fall of the Mutants was inspired by this crossover.
