= Crimson Commando =

- The first appearance of Crimson Commando (Frank Bohannan; lower middle) as seen in The Uncanny X-Men #215 (March 1987). Art by Alan Davis and Dan Green.

Publication information
- Publisher: Marvel Comics
- First appearance: (Bohannan): The Uncanny X-Men #215 (March 1987) (second version): X-Men #106 (Nov. 2000) (third version): X-Men #215 (March 1987)
- Created by: (Bohannan): Chris Claremont; Alan Davis (second version): Chris Claremont; Leinil Francis Yu (third version): Seth Peck; Jefte Palo; Guillermo Mogorron

In-story information
- Alter ego: Frank Bohannan
- Species: Human mutant
- Team affiliations: (Bohannan): Freedom Force; Office of National Emergency (second version): Brotherhood of Mutants (third version): Freedom Force
- Notable aliases: (Bohannan): Commando
- Abilities: (Bohannan): Non-superhuman physical perfection (peak state possible for baseline humans)

Crimson Commando is the name used by three fictional characters, which are either a mutant or a cyborg appearing in American comic books published by Marvel Comics.

== Publication history ==
Frank Bohannan first appeared in The Uncanny X-Men #215 (March 1987), and was created by Chris Claremont and Alan Davis.

The second version only appeared briefly in X-Men vol. 2 #106 (November 2000), and was created by Chris Claremont and Leinil Francis Yu.

The third version appears in X-Men (vol. 3) #40 (March 2013), and was created by Seth Peck, Jefte Palo, and Guillermo Mogorron.

== Fictional character biography ==
=== Frank Bohannan ===
Frank Bohannan was born somewhere in Massachusetts. Bohannan, Stonewall, and Super Sabre, all veterans of World War II, intend to continue their government service after the war by combating communism during the Cold War, but are rejected. Angered by what they perceive as a decline in morals in the United States, the group become vigilantes. They capture criminals, then release and hunt them in the wilderness of upstate New York.

Mistaking Storm (the leader of the X-Men) for a criminal, the team capture and then hunt her. When Storm and Wolverine defeat the three, Stonewall and Crimson Commando agree to turn themselves in. Stonewall and Crimson Commando agree to join Freedom Force, a government-sponsored team of superhumans, in exchange for a commutation of their sentences.

Crimson Commando is gravely wounded during a bungled mission in the Middle East. Freedom Force is sent to Kuwait City to rescue or kill physicist Reinhold Kurtzmann, but encounter the Arabic super-team Desert Sword. Teammate Super Sabre is killed, while Crimson Commando's right hand is severed by Desert Sword member Aminedi.

Cyborg X, a cyborg soldier created by Care Labs, is implied to be Crimson Commando. A testing accident causes him to malfunction, bringing him into a confrontation with Spider-Man and Ghost Rider. Cyborg X later assists Spider-Man in battling the Sinister Six, but is apparently killed in an explosion.

Crimson Commando appears in the reality-altered House of M storyline serving as one of Magneto's royal guards. After this and M-Day, he loses his mutant powers. Without his powers, Crimson Commando begins to die. He kidnaps Hope Summers in an attempt to have her save him, but is killed by Wolverine.

Bohannan was resurrected by the Five at some point during the Krakoan Age, which restored his lost limbs. He did not stay on Krakoa for long and later became the director of the Office of National Emergency. Bohannan opposes the X-Men, but believes that his actions are benefiting the United States.

=== Second version ===
An unnamed, female, African-American version of Crimson Commando appears briefly as a member of Mystique's new Brotherhood of Mutants.

=== Third version ===
A human/cyborg version of Crimson Commando is a member of the Freedom Force. His power armor is equipped with two automatic machine guns as hands and a machine/rail gun mounted on its left shoulder.

== Powers and abilities ==
Frank Bohannan is a mutant who possesses the peak of physical perfection a baseline human can achieve without becoming a superhuman, and thus apparently ages at a much slower rate than normal human beings. In addition, he is resistant to telepathic detection. Bohannan previously had cybernetic enhancements, which were lost following his resurrection.

== In other media ==
The Frank Bohannan incarnation of Crimson Commando appears in X-Men II: The Fall of the Mutants.
