= Adversary (comics) =

The Adversary

Publication information
- Publisher: Marvel Comics
- First appearance: Uncanny X-Men #188 (December 1984)
- Created by: Chris Claremont; John Romita Jr.

In-story information
- Species: Demon
- Notable aliases: The Great Trickster, Nazé
- Abilities: Superhuman strength, speed, stamina, and durability; Magic; Necromancy; Dimensional travel

The Adversary is a demonic supervillain appearing in American comic books published by Marvel Comics. The Adversary first appeared in Uncanny X-Men #188 (December 1984), and was created by Chris Claremont and John Romita Jr. The Adversary is a demon from another plane accidentally brought to Earth by Forge, and acts as an enemy to Forge and the X-Men. The demon is a key figure in the Fall of the Mutants storyline.

The Adversary appears in X-Men '97, voiced by Alison Sealy-Smith.

== Publication history ==
The Adversary first appeared in Uncanny X-Men #188 (December 1984), and was created by Chris Claremont and John Romita Jr.

== Fictional character biography ==
The Adversary is a demon who was initially summoned by the X-Men member Forge several decades ago and has since come back to antagonize the X-Men and threaten the world. During the Vietnam War, Forge saw his company killed by the North Vietnamese. Forge summoned the Adversary to destroy the attackers, but regained his senses and banished the demon. Nevertheless, the Adversary gained a foothold on Earth due to Forge's actions.

Years later, a Dire Wraith kills Forge's mentor Nazé and assumes his form and memories. The Nazé impostor summons the Adversary, only to be killed by him. The Adversary escapes the dimension to which he was bound, capturing Forge and his ally Storm and imprisoning them in Roma's stronghold.

The Adversary travels to Dallas, Texas and battles the combined forces of the X-Men and Freedom Force. The X-Men learn that the Adversary can only be banished by a spell that requires nine individuals to sacrifice themselves and agree to act as the sacrifices. The X-Men die, but are secretly resurrected by Roma.

The Adversary later returns to Earth, having been physically born, but is again banished by Forge.

In Fear Itself, Adversary attends the Devil's Advocacy to discuss the Serpent's actions on Earth.

The Adversary later possesses Forge, but is thwarted and trapped in a prison in Doctor Nemesis' subconsciousness.

== Powers and abilities ==
The Adversary is a powerful demon of the highest order and possesses vast supernatural powers. He is virtually invulnerable to anything but the most powerful magic and iron. He has superhuman strength and endurance.

He can enter and leave different planes of existence and dimensions at will and has reality-warping powers. He can also summon demons and other supernatural creatures to do his bidding.

== In other media ==
The Adversary appears in the X-Men '97 two-part episode "Lifedeath", voiced by Alison Sealy-Smith. This version is an owl-like demon who feeds on negative emotions.
