= Lila Cheney =

Marvel Comics superhero

Publication information
- Publisher: Marvel Comics
- First appearance: The New Mutants Annual #1 (November 1984)
- Created by: Chris Claremont (writer); Bob McLeod (artist)

In-story information
- Species: Human mutant
- Team affiliations: Dazzler and the Resurrections; S.W.O.R.D; X-Terminators; Ally to X-Men, New Mutants, X-Force
- Abilities: Tachyon field allows interstellar teleportation; Field extension to other people and objects; Teleportation to place where own voice has been

Lila Cheney is a fictional interstellar British rock star and mutant who makes appearances as a guest character in X-Men titles. Created by Chris Claremont and Bob McLeod, she made her debut in The New Mutants Annual #1 (November 1984).

Cheney possesses the power of teleportation, but only at interstellar distances. During one of her tryouts, she discovers an abandoned Dyson sphere, which she uses as a home base for her teleports. She is well known for her romantic connection to X-Man Cannonball, as well as her friendship with Strong Guy.

== Publication history ==
Lila Cheney was created by Chris Claremont and Bob McLeod, and introduced in The New Mutants Annual #1 (November 1984).

In the 1980s and 1990s, Lila made frequent appearances in The New Mutants, X-Factor, X-Force, and X-Men titles, with an alternate version of the character appearing in Gambit and the X-Ternals.

She appeared in 8 issues of X-Treme X-Men, and in X-Men: Legacy (vol. 2) as an ally of Legion. She additionally appeared in Captain Marvel (vol. 8), Ms. Marvel: Mutant Menace, the 2025 Dazzler limited series, and the Concert of Champions one-shot.

== Fictional character biography ==
=== Early life ===
Born in England, Lila used her mutant ability of teleportation to adventure across the universe at a young age. During an adventure, she arrives on the alien planet Aladna, where she becomes engaged to Prince Yan. At some point in Lila's life, she was, allegedly, sold by "Earth" to aliens as a slave, before escaping to tour the galaxy as a rockstar and thief, during which she found an abandoned Dyson sphere, which she would make her base.

=== Stealing Earth and meeting Cannonball ===
Lila made a deal to, in turn, sell Earth to an alien race called the Vrakanin. Just before she could execute her plan, she met the New Mutants at her New York concert. Cannonball (Sam Guthrie) saves Lila from a falling speaker, and Lila is instantly attracted to him. When the Vrakanin double-cross her and are defeated, she gives up her thieving career and enters into a romantic relationship with Cannonball.

=== Dazzler and Strong Guy ===
She later moved to Malibu, and hired Dazzler (Alison Blair) as a backup singer and Guido Carosella (Strong Guy) as a bodyguard. When Cannonball and Magik approached Lila for help, she used her connections to help rescue Sunspot and Magma. She also aided Magneto in battling the Beyonder.

Sam and Lila's relationship faced some trouble, but after Sam saved her from her crashed plane, they got back together and Lila met Sam's mother.

=== Adventures in space and apparent death ===
Lila is captured by an alien slaver known as Spyder during one of her concerts. The New Mutants attempt to rescue her, but Lila appears to sacrifice herself when she teleported large monsters released by Spyder into a nearby sun.

Lila survived and was recruited by Deathbird to help her recruit the X-Men in saving Charles Xavier.

Returning to Malibu she would find an amnesiac Dazzler being cared for by Guido. The appearance of Longshot and Spiral dragged Lila into the Mojoverse rebellion, in which she was later captured and pitted against Longshot before being freed. Later, she gives Boom-Boom her blessing to date her former lover Cannonball.

She assists X-Force with missions before running into trouble with aliens known as the K'Lanti. When she corrects her mistake, the race gives her an active explosive, which Strong Guy jumps on to save her. He survives, but the kinetic energy gives him a heart attack and puts him in a coma, to Lila's dismay. After he recovers, he joins Lila in her touring once again.

=== Relationship issues ===
Cannonball and Lila briefly rekindle their relationship, during which he saves her from an anti-mutant attack at her concert. Shortly after they stop dating again.

She retained her powers after M-Day. She joined Legion in spreading positive mutant campaigns in the UK.

Eventually, she returned to Aladna to fulfill her marriage pledge, although Prince Yan ultimately chooses another woman as his wife.

=== Krakoa and Fall of X ===
Cheney later becomes a citizen of the mutant nation of Krakoa, and a member of S.W.O.R.D. as a teleporter. She also assisted Cable as a member of the X-Terminators. She was believed dead after the fall of Krakoa, but was revealed to have been blackmailed by Mojo, who held her fans hostage. She recruited Kamala Khan to help her save them.

Lila next appeared as a main act in Concert of Champions, alongside other musicians such as Dazzler and Luna Snow. She helped defeat the threat of Deep Void by teleporting their supporters to her Dyson sphere.

As a musician, she has a loyal fanbase known as the Li-natics, and has often performed with fellow mutant singer Dazzler. She performed at the wedding of Jean Grey and Scott Summers, as well as on Krakoa.

== Powers and abilities ==
Lila Cheney is a powerful teleporter, capable of transporting herself and others across vast distances of space in short periods of time. She is also able to teleport objects, making her an adept thief. However, she is unable to travel short distances due to the speed of her teleportation, instead using a Dyson sphere as a midpoint to travel shorter distances. She has also been shown to teleport to places where her voice is being played. She is a capable fighter, and has been shown using alien weaponry.

She is also a musician, with a vast intergalactic following. She performs electric guitar as well as vocals.

== Other versions ==
In the Age of Apocalypse, Lila is in a relationship with Gambit, and joined the X-Ternals in their mission for the M'Kraan Crystal.

Alternative versions appear in X-Men: The End, House of M, X-Men '92, Spider-Gwen's reality, and in the X-Babies.

== In other media ==
- Posters of Lila Cheney appears in Marvel's Guardians of the Galaxy and Marvel's Wolverine, as well as on a jukebox in the latter.
- Lila Cheney has been referenced by name in X2, M.O.D.O.K, Spider-Man: Miles Morales, and Marvel Rivals.
- Lila Cheney received a Heroclix figure in the Mutations & Monsters line.
- Lila Cheney appeared in a fan-made music video titled "I Will Steal Your Heart".

== Reception ==
Screen Rant ranked Lila Cheney 4th in "Gambit's 10 Greatest Love Interests That Marvel Fans Still Swoon Over", 13th in "The 15 Most Powerful Teleporting Superheroes", and 5th in "10 X-Men Couples Who Were Always Going to End in Disaster" alongside Cannonball. She was also included in their list of best singers in the Marvel Universe. CBR included her as a hero that Captain Marvel trusts.
