= Age of Apocalypse =

1995–96 Marvel comic book crossover

- Publisher: Marvel Comics
- Publication date: 1995–1996
- Genre: Superhero; Crossover
Title(s)
- Age of Apocalypse: The Chosen
- Amazing X-Men #1–4
- Astonishing X-Men #1–4
- Factor X #1–4
- Gambit & The X-Ternals #1–4
- Generation Next #1–4
- Weapon X #1–4
- X-Calibre #1–4
- X-Man #1–4 -1 53–54, Annual '96
- X-Men: Alpha
- X-Men Omega
- X-Men: Chronicles #1–2
- X-Universe #1–2
- Main character(s): Alternate universe X-Men and associates

Creative team
- Writers: Scott Lobdell; Mark Waid; Fabian Nicieza; John Francis Moore; Larry Hama; Warren Ellis; Jeph Loeb; Howard Mackie; Terry Kavanagh
- Pencillers: Roger Cruz; Steve Epting; Joe Madureira; Andy Kubert; Tony Daniel; Salvador Larroca; Chris Bachalo; Adam Kubert; Ken Lashley; Steve Skroce; Terry Dodson; Ian Churchill; Carlos Pacheco; Joe Bennett; (plus assorted artists who did pin-ups)

"Age of Apocalypse" is a 1995 comic book crossover storyline mostly published in the X-Men franchise of books by Marvel Comics. The Age of Apocalypse was retconned as having occurred in the alternate universe of Earth-295.

During the entirety of the Age of Apocalypse event the regularly published X-Men comics were replaced by new X-Men related mini series, focusing on various teams and individuals in the Age of Apocalypse world including X-Calibre, Gambit and the X-Ternals, Generation Next, Astonishing X-Men, Amazing X-Men, Weapon X, Factor X, X-Man and X-Universe. The event was bookended by two one shots, X-Men Alpha and X-Men Omega.

The storyline starts with Legion (David Haller), a psychotic mutant who traveled back in time to kill Magneto before he can commit various crimes against humanity. Legion accidentally kills Charles Xavier, his father, leading to a major change in the timeline. The death of Professor Xavier leads Apocalypse to attack 10 years sooner than he did in the original timeline, taking control of Earth and altering everything that happened from that point forward. Apocalypse is opposed by several factions of mutant resistance, including a group led by Magneto. The group manages to send the mutant Bishop back in time to prevent the murder of Professor Xavier, undoing the entire timeline.

In 2005, Marvel published an Age of Apocalypse one-shot and miniseries to celebrate the 10th anniversary of the fan favorite event. The book looks at what happened after the end of the original story. The "Dark Angel Saga" in 2011 revisited the alternate reality once more, leading to an Age of Apocalypse ongoing series launched in 2012 that ran for 14 issues. The world was also featured as part of Marvel's 2015 Secret Wars. In May 2025, it was announced that another event titled X-Men of Apocalypse would launch in November written by Jeph Loeb.

== Storyline ==
Legion (David Haller), a psychotic mutant on Earth and son of Charles Xavier, travels back in time with the intention of killing Magneto (Erik Lehnsherr). However, Legion travels to a time when Magneto and Xavier are still friends while in Israel. As Xavier dies trying to protect Magneto, Legion vanishes, and a new timeline is created. The only person aware of how history has changed is Lucas Bishop, a time traveling mutant who followed Legion.

Because of Xavier's sacrifice, Magneto comes to believe in his late friend's dream of a peaceful coexistence between humans and mutants. Apocalypse (En Sabah Nur), an immortal mutant villain, was monitoring the fight. He chooses this moment as the perfect time to begin his world conquest, which did not happen in the mainstream Marvel universe for another ten years.

Magneto assembles the X-Men just as Apocalypse begins his war. Despite the X-Men's resistance, Apocalypse conquers all of North America and eventually mutants are considered the ruling class. Apocalypse initiates a genocidal campaign called "cullings," killing millions of humans. Meanwhile, the changes in the timeline result in a destructive crystallization wave created by the M'Kraan Crystal.

=== X-Men: Alpha ===
X-Men: Alpha was published in January 1995 and launched the "Age of Apocalypse" crossover story. It briefly shows readers how many popular X-Men characters have changed in this new world. Bishop is reunited with Magneto while retaining fragmented memories of the true timeline. Magneto assigns his X-Men and their allies various missions. Some are to gather the forces needed to change history while others will continue resisting Apocalypse. The story continues in eight interlocking miniseries, each focusing on a different team of X-Men or other mutant forces. Each miniseries temporarily replaced one of the monthly X-Men titles being published at the time.

=== X-Calibre ===
X-Calibre is a team built around Nightcrawler (Kurt Wagner), who is sent by Magneto to locate Destiny (Irene Adler), a mutant capable of seeing into the future, so that she can verify Bishop's story. Nightcrawler must travel to Avalon, a secret refuge where mutants and humans live together in peace. Along his journey, he encounters John Proudstar (Thunderbird), the monk Cain, the pirate Callisto, and his mother Mystique (Raven Darkholme). The chief antagonists for Nightcrawler's journey consist of the Pale Riders, a trio of Apocalypse's servants made up of Moonstar (Danielle Moonstar), Damask (Emma Steed), Dead Man Wade (Wade Wilson) and the Shadow King (Amahl Farouk). Nightcrawler's team consists of Mystique, Switchback, and later Damask, who joins Nightcrawler after realizing the beauty Avalon has to offer. The X-Calibre series gets its name from an in-joke between Nightcrawler and his mother, Mystique, because of the caliber of bullets she uses, simply stamped with an X. This title replaced Excalibur.

=== Gambit and the X-Ternals ===
Gambit (Remy LeBeau)'s X-Ternals consist of Sunspot (Roberto de Costa), Jubilee (Jubilation Lee), Strong Guy (Guido Carosella) and Lila Cheney. They are sent deep into space using Lila's teleportation to retrieve a shard of the M'Kraan Crystal, essential to the verification of Bishop's alternate reality. The X-Ternals are pursued by Rictor, a henchman of Apocalypse desperate to earn his master's praise by killing Gambit. Upon reaching Shi'ar space, the X-ternals fight the Imperial Guard to retrieve the crystal shard. Upon their return to Earth, Strong Guy betrays the team, not only stealing the Crystal, but also kidnapping Magneto's son Charles. This title replaced X-Force.

=== Generation Next ===
Generation Next consists of a young group of mutant students trained by the husband and wife team of Colossus (Piotr "Peter" Rasputin) and Shadowcat (Katherine Pryde-Rasputin). They consist of Chamber (Jonothan Starsmore), Husk (Paige Guthrie), Mondo, Vincente Cimetta, and Skin (Angelo Espinoza). They are sent by Magneto into the Seattle Core to rescue Colossus' sister, Illyana Rasputin, who is the last surviving transdimensional teleporter. Illyana Rasputin is a slave of the Sugar Man, one of Apocalypse's prefects and ruler of the Seattle Core. Mondo finds Illyana Rasputin and hides her inside of his body, intending to smuggle her out at shift change. When Mondo is found out, the ensuing fight finds the Sugar Man killing Mondo with a blast from his tongue, exposing the rest of Generation Next. While fighting a near hopeless battle, Generation Next is left for dead by Colossus, who sacrifices them to save his sister. This title replaced Generation X.

=== Astonishing X-Men ===
The Astonishing X-Men are led by Rogue (Anna Marie Lehnsherr, Magneto's wife) and consist of Sabretooth (Victor Creed), Blink (Clarice Ferguson), Wild Child (Kyle Gibney), Morph (Kevin Sidney) and Sunfire (Shiro Yoshida). They are sent by Magneto to stop the cullings, which are being undertaken by Holocaust, Apocalypse's son and one of his horsemen. While helping with the evacuation and protection of humans, Sabretooth asks Blink to teleport him to Holocaust's location, which she reluctantly does. Sabretooth and Holocaust fight a vicious duel but Sabretooth is defeated and seemingly killed, horrifying Blink. The team then fights Holocaust and his Infinites, destroying his factory. However, Holocaust manages to escape and the team returns to Xavier's mansion, where Rogue learns that both her son and her husband have been captured. Sabretooth is revealed by Iceman to have survived the battle, to Blink's delight. This title replaced The Uncanny X-Men.

=== Amazing X-Men ===
The Amazing X-Men consist of team leader Quicksilver (Pietro Lehnsherr) and Storm (Ororo Munroe), Dazzler (Alison Blaire), Banshee (Sean Cassidy), Iceman (Robert "Bobby" Drake), and Exodus (Paris Bennet). The team is sent to Maine to aid in the evacuation of humanity to Europe. During this mission, the team fights Apocalypse's Brotherhood of Chaos, as well as the Horseman Abyss, who is defeated by Quicksilver. During their absence from the Xavier Mansion, Magneto and Bishop are attacked by Apocalypse himself, who captures them both. Fulfilling their mission, Quicksilver splits up his team to help the other X-Men: sending Iceman to rendezvous with Rogue's team (the Astonishing X-Men) and Dazzler and Exodus to find Magneto's son, Charles. Finally, Quicksilver, Storm, and Banshee go to rescue Bishop, who is in the hands of the Madri, Apocalypse's priests. This title replaced X-Men.

=== Weapon X ===
Weapon X (Logan) and his lover Jean Grey are depicted in this series carrying out missions for the Human High Council. Jean and Weapon X drift apart, as the Human High Council intends to launch a nuclear strike on the U.S. as Jean is appalled by the loss of life it would cause. After Weapon X concludes a battle with Donald Pierce, Jean leaves to help evacuate the U.S., bidding a tearful farewell to Logan. Weapon X is then sent to recruit Gateway, whose teleportation ability is necessary to bring the fleet to America. As the fleet leaves, Weapon X decides to join them, if only to find Jean somewhere in America before the bombs are dropped. This title temporarily replaced Wolverine.

=== Factor X ===
Factor X consists of the Elite Mutant Force (EMF), who serve Apocalypse. They are split into five sibling groups: Cyclops and Havok (Scott Summers and Alex Summers), Emplate and the Twins (Marius, Nicole, and Claudette St. Croix), Cannonball and Amazon (Sam and Elizabeth Guthrie), the Bedlam Brothers (Jesse and Terrence Aaronson), and Aurora and Northstar (Jean-Marie and Jean-Paul Beaubier). The EMF is tasked with maintaining control of Apocalypse's breeding pens, where people are imprisoned, tortured, and experimented on by Beast, also a member of the EMF. Havok, jealous of his brother's leadership role, discovers that Cyclops is a traitor who has been helping people escape the pens; and in one such escape attempt, both Aurora and Northstar are injured. Havok then exposes Cyclops and attempts to kill him, but Cyclops escapes with the aid of Jean Grey, who has arrived to evacuate as many people as she can before the Human High Council's nuclear strike. The Bedlam Brothers also choose to side with Cyclops, and they successfully defeat both Amazon and Cannonball. Cyclops and Jean defeat Havok, and as they lead the freed prisoners out of the pens, Havok is determined to kill his brother. This title replaced X-Factor.

=== X-Man ===
The protagonist of X-Man is Nate Grey, a mutant born of Cyclops' and Jean Grey's DNA, and the most powerful telekinetic in the world. He lives under the guidance of his father figure Forge, who leads a group of outcasts consisting of Mastermind, Toad, Brute, and Sauron, who attack trains and factories of Apocalypse while masquerading as a theatre troupe. This title replaced Cable.

=== X-Men: Omega ===
X-Men: Omega was published in June 1995 and concluded the "Age of Apocalypse" crossover story.

== Characters and affiliations ==
=== Mutant heroes ===
The only then-existing major mutant character missing in the original Age of Apocalypse is Psylocke. When the "Age of Apocalypse" storyline was revisited a decade later, she appeared in X-Men: Age of Apocalypse #4 in Asian form. Her origin remains unknown. There has been no explanation of what she was doing during the original Age of Apocalypse, other than the fact that she had some kind of past connection with Weapon X.

Team	Leader	Members	Notes
Generation Next	Colossus (deceased), Shadowcat (deceased)	Chamber (deceased), Xorn (AoA version of Husk, deceased), Know-It-All (AoA version of M) (status unknown), Mondo (deceased), Skin (deceased), Vincente Cimetta (deceased)	
The Outcasts	Forge (deceased)	Brute (The Age of Apocalypse version of Sunder, deceased), Mastermind (deceased), Soaron (The AoA version of Sauron, deceased), Sonique (The AoA version of Siryn), Toad (deceased), X-Man (Nate Grey, MIA)	X-Man is the "son" of Jean Grey and Scott Summers, created from their DNA by Mister Sinister, and as such is a "spiritual twin" of Cable.
X-Calibre	Nightcrawler	Damask (The AoA version of the Black Queen of London's Hellfire Club) (MIA), Mystique (deceased), Switchback (MIA)	Following the fall of Apocalypse the team disbanded. The current whereabouts of Damask and Switchback are unknown.
X-Men	Magneto (deceased), Jean Grey	Current Members: Nightcrawler, Sabretooth; Former members: Rogue (deceased), Silver Samurai (deceased), Sunfire (deceased), Wild Child (deceased), MODOK (Charles Xavier's clone connected to Cerebro) (destroyed), Banshee (deceased), Beak, Blink, Colossus (deceased), Dazzler (status unknown), Exodus (MIA), Gambit (deceased), Kirika (a.k.a. X-23, deceased), Iceman (defected/deceased), Jubilee (status unknown), Morph (MIA), Quicksilver (deceased), Scarlet Witch (deceased), Shadowcat (deceased), Storm (defected), Weapon X (Wolverine in normal continuity) (defected), Wolfsbane (status unknown), Xorn (The AoA version of Husk, deceased); Allies: Bishop (deceased), Charles Lehnsherr (infant son of Magneto and Rogue) (deceased), Nanny (Charles' robotic babysitter – destroyed), Illyana Rasputin (status unknown)	Led out of Wundagore Mountain until the complex was destroyed by Nemesis. Later moved to the ruined Xavier mansion, which never became a school in this universe. After the fall of Apocalypse, Magneto moved his X-Men to Washington, D.C., where they took up residence in the newly constructed Xavier Institute. More recently they are now based in Atlantis.
X-Ternals	Gambit (deceased)	Lila Cheney (status unknown), Jubilee (status unknown), Strong Guy (deceased), Sunspot (considered deceased by his teammates)	Following the fall of Apocalypse the team disbanded. The current whereabouts of Lila Cheney and Jubilee are unknown.
New Mutants		Beak (status unknown), Kirika (deceased), Xorn (deceased), Silver Samurai (deceased), Wolfsbane (status unknown), Psylocke (status unknown)	Mutants that joined Magneto's cause after the fall of Apocalypse.

=== Other anti-Apocalypse forces ===
Besides the X-Men and its many offshoots, the Human High Council remains as the only other power opposing Apocalypse. Unlike the X-Men, however, the Human High Council considers the extermination of mutants as a viable option. Bolivar and Moira Trask, as well as Brian Braddock, are the major proponents for a mutant holocaust. Secretly, the Human High Council supports the Human Underground Resistance.

X-Universe also reveals the fate of several non-mutants individuals. Peter Parker was executed because he was a potential contact for Gwen Stacy. T'Challa and Namor perished when Apocalypse attacked Wakanda and Atlantis. Frank Castle went missing following a mutant raid on a Buddhist temple where he had sought peace after the death of his family. Reed Richards and Johnny Storm sacrificed themselves in the evacuation of Manhattan.

Team	Members	Notes
Human High Council	Brian Braddock (Captain Britain) (deceased), Emma Frost, Moira Trask (deceased), Thunderbolt Ross (status unknown), Bolivar Trask, Mariko Yashida (status unknown)	
Human High Council agents	Clint Barton (Hawkeye), Donald Blake (Thor, deceased), Carol Danvers (Ms. Marvel, deceased), Gateway, Ben Grimm (Thing, deceased), Gwen Stacy, Tony Stark (Iron Man), Susan Storm (Invisible Woman) (deceased), Victor von Doom (Doctor Doom) (deceased)	
Sentinels		Programmed to protect humans above anything else, for which they are capable of not attacking mutants if it aids in the accomplishment of their Prime Directive.
The Underground	Valerie Cooper	An underground resistance group that aids refugees escape from North America to Europe.
	Henry Peter Gyrich	A human supremacist suicide bomber that threatens the nightclub Heaven.
	Robert Kelly	An activist of mutant-human peaceful coexistence, for which Apocalypse imprisoned him. Rescued by Magneto, Nightcrawler, and Rogue. Later brokered a non-aggression treaty between the Human High Council and Apocalypse.
	Joseph Robertson (deceased)	Maintains the clandestine newspaper, the Daily Bugle, with the purpose of informing humans of the news kept in secret by Apocalypse's regime.
Deceased Mentions	Frank Castle	Killed in action.
Deceased Mentions	Peter Parker	Deceased human boyfriend of Gwen Stacy who never became Spider-Man.
Deceased Mentions	Reed Richards	Died in the evacuation of Manhattan Island.
Deceased Mentions	Johnny Storm	Died in the evacuation of Manhattan Island.
Deceased Mentions	T'Challa	Died after Wakanda was attacked by Apocalypse's Horsemen.
Deceased Mentions	Namor	Died after Atlantis was attacked by Apocalypse's Horsemen.

=== Apocalypse's agents ===
Team	Members	Notes
The Brotherhood of Chaos (Brotherhood of Mutants)	Arclight (deceased), Box (Madison Jeffries) (deceased), Copycat (deceased), Spyne (deceased), Yeti (deceased)	Arclight, Spyne and Yeti were mentioned to have been killed by Iceman, their deaths however were not shown on panel.
Inhuman Strike Force	Black Bolt (deceased), Crystal (deceased), Gorgon (deceased), Karnak (deceased), Lockjaw (deceased), Medusa (deceased), Rhino (deceased), Triton (deceased)	Death's personal army. They are the genetically altered clones of the Inhuman royal family with the exception of Rhino.
Bounty Hunters	Domino (deceased), Caliban (deceased), Grizzly (deceased)	Hunters in the service of Apocalypse. Their prime objective was to find and bring dead or alive the mutant known as Nate Grey.
Elite Mutant Force	Amazon (Lizzie Guthrie) (deceased), Aurora (deceased), Beast (MIA), the Bedlam brothers Jesse (MIA) and Terrence Aaronson (King Bedlam in normal continuity) (MIA), Cannonball (deceased), Cyclops, Emplate (deceased), Havok (deceased), the Monets (status unknown), Northstar (deceased)	Mister Sinister's EMF is composed of mutant siblings belonging to powerful bloodlines, except for Beast, who serves as Sinister's leading scientist.
Enslavers of Seattle Core	Quietus (deceased), Sugar Man, Rastus (deceased)	The core was a slave camp that generated electricity across North America.
Horsemen of Apocalypse	Abyss (deceased), Holocaust/Nemesis (deceased), Mister Sinister (deceased), Prelate Rasputin (brother of Colossus) (deceased): Former members: Bastion (deceased), Candra (deceased), Death (deceased), Gideon (deceased), War (deceased)	Sabretooth served as the Horsemen's leading Hound
The Infinites	Created by Sinister and Beast from the genetic material of captured mutants and humans either deemed unworthy of living or executed for opposing Apocalypse. In the end to ensure his survival, Apocalypse made possible for the Infinites to gain the ability to self-replicate themselves.	Infinites were led by officers holding ranks such as Prelate or Mudir and were employed to carry out Cullings, massacres of human communities throughout North America.
Mecha-Mutates	Groomed specifically for assaults on the human rebels' mutant-nullification grids, they are actually regular human traitors who traded their humanity for the privilege of serving the Dark Lord Apocalypse.	Hatchet-9, several unnamed members
Fedayeen	Mudir Rictor (deceased) leader of the Kurbaj Squadron	The Fedayeen are the police of the Age of Apocalypse. Unlike the Infinites, they are not generally further mutated.
The Madri	Duplicates of Jamie Madrox (deceased)	Experimented on by both Beast and Sinister, his powers have mutated out of his control. Now, the Madri, form the wicked clergy of Apocalypse, worshipping him as a god and serving as his inquisitors.
Marauders	Arcade (deceased), Dirigible (Kingpin, deceased), Owl (deceased), Red (deceased)	Human terrorists that have betrayed mankind.
The Pale Riders	Damask (defected), Dead Man Wade (deceased), Danielle Moonstar (deceased)	A trio of assassins serving Apocalypse.
Altered Humans (Age of Apocalypse versions of the Reavers)	Clegg (AoA version of Roughouse, destroyed), Dead-Eye (destroyed), Mangle (destroyed), Donald Pierce (destroyed), Slocum (AoA version of Bloodscream, destroyed), Vultura (AoA version of Dragoness, destroyed)	Humans enhanced by Apocalypse's techno-organic virus.
Stryfe Force		Mikhail Rasputin's personal army. Formed by the best of his Upscale Program which is a program to augment the normal humans with cybernetics implants. They are activated by a silent signal.
Hellions	Catseye, Jetstream, Roulette, Tarot, Beef, Bevatron	A team of young mutants who were trained to become Apocalypse's agents.
Hounds	Sabretooth (defected), Wild Child (defected), Caliban (deceased), Wolverine (not the same as Wolverine/Logan in normal continuity, deceased)	Mutants used to hunt down and imprison mutants and humans in concentration camps or simply to kill their targets. Sabretooth was used as the leading Hound to the Horsemen until his defection. Wild Child was too ferocious that he was kept a prisoner until Sabretooth rescued him. Caliban was used as the prime hound to the Bounty Hunters and Wolverine was a mutant altered by the Beast who served Holocaust as his leading hunter after the defection of Sabretooth.
	Absorbing Man and Diablo	Two wardens in Apocalypse's prisoner camps in Mexico.
	Bruce Banner / The Thing	A scientist of the Human High Council, secretly "bought" by Mikhail Rasputin, who supplies him with mutants for experiments in which Banner seeks to mutate himself.
	Magma (deceased)	An assassin sent by Apocalypse to eliminate the Human High Council.
	Keeper Murdock	Mikhail Rasputin's personal warden. Responsible for watching over Empath, Mikhail's prisoner.
	Rex (MIA)	Apocalypse's majordomo. He appears to be currently at large and wanted by the X-Men for the part he played in the empire of Apocalypse.
	Shadow King (MIA)	Apocalypse's leading telepath.
	Strong Guy (deceased)	Implanted with a bomb and forced to serve Apocalypse. Betrays the X-Ternals.
	Sebastian Shaw	He appears to be currently at large and wanted by the X-Men for the part he played in the empire of Apocalypse.
	Balrog-Class Meta-Cyborg	Created by Sinister in his genetic processing tanks. They appear to be giant land-based cybernetic squids or octopuses.

=== Neutrals ===
Group	Members	Notes
Avalon	Cain (Juggernaut) (deceased), Destiny (status unknown), Douglas Ramsey (deceased), Wendy (deceased)	A haven for humans and mutants, housed in a secret area of the hidden prehistoric land known as Savage Land.
The Brood	Misty Knight (deceased), Christopher Summers (deceased), Colleen Wing (deceased)	Humans transformed into Brood following the escape of Christopher Summers (who had been infected by a Brood Queen).
Heaven	Angel (deceased), Karma (deceased), Scarlett MacKenzie (presumed deceased)	A nightclub run by Angel and its employees.
	Artemis (deceased), Avalanche, Blob (deceased), Newt (deceased), Phantazia (status unknown), Polaris (status unknown), Pyro (deceased)	Prisoners in Mister Sinister's breeding pens.
Scavengers	Cobra (deceased), Mister Hyde (deceased)	Cannibalistic mutates who plague graveyards and attack anyone, regardless of their allegiance.
Morlocks	Feral, Leech, Marrow, Skids, Danna Moonstar, Thornn	Survivors of Mister Sinister's experiments.
	Bullseye	One of the many human prisoners aboard Mikhail Rasputin's ships.
	Callisto (deceased)	Leader of a band of pirates.
	Peter Corbeau	A scientist and astronomer captured by Apocalypse and forced to serve as his librarian.
	Newell (Stingray)	Captain of the submarine Excalibur that transports refugees to Avalon.
	John Proudstar (Thunderbird) (deceased)	Leader of Ghost Dance, an anti-Apocalypse cult and the first stage in the Infernal Gallop to Avalon.
	Rossovich (Omega Red) (deceased)	An information broker.
	Calvin Rankin (Mimic) (deceased)	A victim of Sugar Man's plague experiment.
	Tiger Shark	A secret creation of Dark Beast that is kept in his laboratory.

=== Timeline escapees ===
Some characters escaped the Age of Apocalypse into the Earth-616 continuity. These include Dark Beast, Nate Grey (the Age of Apocalypse version of Cable), Blink, Holocaust and Sugar Man.

- Nate Grey allied himself with the X-Men a few times and once with Spider-Man. He later "died" by disseminating into every life form on the Earth, but has since returned to the living.
- Blink escaped into the multiverse and ended up leading the reality-hopping team of heroes known as the Exiles. Her counterpart on Earth-616 was thought to have died during the "Phalanx Covenant" storyline, but brought back from the dead by Selene during the "Necrosha" event.
- Sabretooth survived through the same means as Blink and joined a team of reality-hopping super beings known as Weapon X. During one mission, he opted to stay behind on to raise David Richards. Eventually, he was brought back into action and joined the Exiles. He returned to the Age of Apocalypse. During the X-Men of Apocalypse storyline that took place in Earth 616, Sabretooth's companion Wildchild was critically injured. After also finding out that Sabretooth from this timeline was dead, AoA Sabretooth decided to make a new life for himself there while also seeking out help treating Wildchild's condition.

=== Former timeline escapees ===
- Holocaust remained at large in the main Marvel Universe until he joined the Exiles and was killed by another universe's evil version of Hyperion.
- Sabretooth survived through the same means as Blink and joined a team of reality-hopping super beings known as Weapon X. During one mission, he opted to stay behind on to raise David Richards. Eventually, he was brought back into action and joined the Exiles. He has since returned to the Age of Apocalypse.
- Hatchet-9, the only surviving Mecha-Mutate officer of Assault-Regiment Delta, a regiment of traitor humans who traded limbs and more for the power and privilege of serving the High Lord Apocalypse.
- Rastus, a heavily two-headed mutated creation of Sugar Man and one of many wardens of Seattles' Core, was also revealed to have escaped to Earth-616. He joined Sugar Man and lived in the catacombs underneath the island nation of Genosha until he was accidentally discovered by the Dark Beast. He was eventually killed by Callisto.
- Wild Child left this timeline when a time-traveler, Quentin Quire, saved him from the Friends of Humanity and then used Wild Child to replace the latter's counterpart, who had recently died. Wild Child was later returned to the Age of Apocalypse and subsequently killed in battle.
- Blob left the Age of Apocalypse. He later joined Daken's Brotherhood with the apparent goal of exacting revenge on X-Force. He was killed by the AoA Nightcrawler, who teleported a shark inside his body.
- Iceman defected and was tracked down by Wolverine, Deadpool, and the AoA Nightcrawler. During the fight, Nightcrawler teleported to a factory and fought Iceman, defeating him without either man using their powers. Once Iceman was defeated, Nightcrawler threw his body into an incinerator.
- Beast was sent twenty years into Earth-616's past. This allowed for several retcons which were used to explain that he (now known as Dark Beast) was responsible for the creation of the Morlocks and also why Mister Sinister initiated the "Mutant Massacre", as he recognized his stolen handiwork and ordered it exterminated as a debasement of his art. He later came under the employment of Norman Osborn's Dark X-Men, with the responsibility of keeping his counterpart and Charles Xavier captive while Osborn carried out his plan. He was thought to be deceased, after apparently dying in a bomb explosion after progressively suffering from fatal health problems due to experimenting on himself. During the 2017 "Secret Empire" storyline, Dark Beast turns up alive and healthy, but is killed by Magik.
- Sugar Man was killed by a mysterious assailant who was hunting down the former Age of Apocalypse residents.

== Prequels ==
Before the tenth anniversary, the Age of Apocalypse was considered a dead reality that no longer existed—a fact that was frequently mentioned by timeline escapees, such as Sugar Man and Blink. However, there were quite a few prequels written that took place before its destruction.

By the Light told the story of Blink transporting the X-Men to the moon where they faced Apocalypse's new horseman of Death, Maximus the Mad. Sinister Bloodlines followed the return of a Brood-infected Christopher Summers (Corsair) to Earth and his reunion, after escaping the experimentations of Sinister and Dark Beast, with Scott and Alex.

Blink was a four issue miniseries intended to reintroduce the Age of Apocalypse version of Blink as a teaser to the Exiles ongoing series. This story takes place prior to the "Age of Apocalypse" main events, but is largely set in the Negative Zone. Blink becomes lost in the Negative Zone after attempting to incite Blastaar towards war with Apocalypse and instead joins a rebellion against Blastaar alongside her lover, who turns out to be a de-evolved version of Annihilus. The last four pages of the final issue show Blink during the destruction of the Age of Apocalypse and becoming unhinged from time.

X-Man, during its run, occasionally re-visited the Age of Apocalypse, both through time travel and flashbacks. X-Man #-1 shows Mister Sinister releasing Nate from his growth vat as a child to check on his progress. In the 1996 X-Man Annual, Sugar Man uses a variation on a time machine powered by Nate's psionic force to return to the early years of Apocalypse's rule where he hopes to take control himself. Nate follows and meets up with Forge, Magneto, Morph, and Mastermind, and is surprised to discover that Forge knew that he would be there because an older Nate Grey had time traveled and told Forge about his memories of this event. On the orders of this older Nate Grey, Forge forces the younger Nate to re-power the machine and return himself and Sugar Man to Earth-616. This leads to a rift between Forge and Magneto, who believed they should have allowed Nate to stay so that he could help them fight Apocalypse. Later, in X-Man #53 and #54, Nate, Jean Grey, and Cyclops run across a temporal rift that brings an infinite processing plant to Earth-616.

== Age of Apocalypse 10th Anniversary ==
In 2005, Marvel published an Age of Apocalypse one-shot and miniseries to celebrate the 10th anniversary of the fan favorite event.

The one-shot features stories set before the events depicted in the original "Age of Apocalypse" event, similar in focus to the Tales from the Age of Apocalypse issues. The one-shot contains the story of how Colossus and Shadowcat left the X-Men to train Generation Next; how Sabretooth met Wild Child; the first appearance of the Silver Samurai; and how the world survived the Human High Council's nuclear attack.

The limited series, which takes place after the nuclear attack in X-Men: Omega, introduced several characters who were not in the original storyline. Long time characters Cloak and Dagger, Psylocke, and the Morlocks (including Feral, Leech, Marrow, Skids, and Thornn), who were survivors of Mister Sinister's experiments, are introduced. Newer characters Beak, Icarus, and X-23 are seen along with an alternate version of Xorn. Jean Grey is also revealed to have saved everyone from the nuclear attack by tapping into the Phoenix Force-level powers, and is resurrected by Sinister.

== Dark Angel Saga ==
In 2011, the Age of Apocalypse was featured in a storyline in the ongoing series Uncanny X-Force 11–18 by Rick Remender.

Seeking a Celestial 'Life Seed' to save Angel (Warren Worthington) from becoming the new Apocalypse, The Uncanny X-Force, under the guidance of Dark Beast, journey to the Age of Apocalypse. The world, which during the previous appearance had seemed to be on the road to recovery, has once again fallen on hard times, similar to when Apocalypse was ruling, with Sentinels now roaming the streets. Nightcrawler's team, realizing that the sentinels are descending on their position, evacuates along with X-Force, taking them to the X-Men's new base in Atlantis.

The Black Legion, a group of psychotic and merciless killers under the service of the Heir of Apocalypse, consisting of Blob, Manphibian, Demon-Ock (a demonic creature with mechanical tentacles), Beta-Red (a female counterpart of Omega Red), Grimm Chamber (a Thing/Chamber hybrid), Iron Ghost (a Ghost Rider/Iron Man hybrid), Orange Hulk (a solar-powered Hulk), White Cloak (a Cloak/Dagger hybrid), Zombie Sentry (an undead version of Sentry) and Venomcap (Captain America bonded with a symbiote), confronts the group. During the fight, X-Force and the Earth-295 X-Men run into Weapon X (Logan/Wolverine Earth-295), the Heir of Apocalypse.

== Age of Apocalypse ongoing series ==
Age of Apocalypse
- Cover of Age of Apocalypse #1 (May, 2012). Art by Humberto Ramos.

Publication information
- Publisher: Marvel Comics
- Schedule: Monthly
- Format: Ongoing series
- Genre: Superhero
- Publication date: May 2012 – June 2013
- No. of issues: 14
- Main character: X-Terminated

Creative team
- Created by: David Lapham
- Written by: David Lapham

=== Publishing history ===
In the Marvel Point One one-shot, a new team of anti-mutant humans calling themselves the X-Terminated, pledged to combat the rule of the ascended Weapon X and his minions.

=== Plot summary ===
Jean Grey and Sabretooth return to Earth 616. Weapon X and his Black Legion attack the last human city where Weapon X slays both Magneto and Rogue, leaving Jean Grey and Sabretooth the last two X-Men alive. Jean telepathically nudges clones of the Scarlet Witch to recreate the Decimation and remove all mutants' powers across the globe. However, this was only successful within a radius of 12 feet, so Jean Grey and Sabretooth are both left de-powered. The human coalition distracts Weapon X with a bomb long enough for the group to escape as the city explodes behind them. Harper Simons joins with the human team, the X-Terminated. Others who work with the X-Terminated are Doctor Moreau and Bolivar Trask.

Jean Grey absorbs the power of the Death Seed; thanks to her history with the Phoenix Force, though, Jean was strong enough to reject the power of the Death Seed and displaced it. After everything died down, Weapon Omega emerged from the rubble as Logan once again, his mind now clear of the corrupting force of the Death Seed. Unknown to him or Jean, however, the energies of the seed had in fact been contained by Bolivar Trask in a giant machine under the Nevada Desert.

==== "X-Termination" ====
In March 2013, the X-Treme X-Men, Age of Apocalypse, and Astonishing X-Men titles were part of the "X-Termination" crossover event, which focused on the AoA Nightcrawler's trip home. Age of Apocalypse #14, the final issue of the series, will be Part 3 of the event.

== Age of Apocalypse 30th Anniversary ==
To mark the 30th anniversary of the legendary Age of Apocalypse, Marvel Comics launched a six-part event series that directly connects the dystopian freedom fighters of the alternative Earth-295 timeline with the mainstream Uncanny X-Men.

== What If ==
In the alternate reality depicted in What If... The Age of Apocalypse Had Not Ended? Magneto, giving up on Bishop's mission in the final moments, rescued his family from the nuclear explosions alongside some of his allies. Magneto, Rogue, Sunfire, Quicksilver, and Weapon X found themselves working with the last remaining human heroes (including Tony Stark, Invisible Woman and Gwen Stacy, the latter of which formed a romance with Quicksilver) to deal with a new threat: the coming of Galactus.

As there was no Fantastic Four, it fell to the survivors to work against Galactus and his herald, the Silver Surfer. As the heroes sprung into action, Night-Thrasher ended up using advanced technology to empower himself with amazing psychic powers. Together, they were able to do the impossible and claim victory. After Weapon X used his adamantium claws to kill the Silver Surfer, the collective psychic potential of humanity was focused against Galactus, eventually killing him.

== Secret Wars (2015) ==
The Age of Apocalypse is featured as one of the many domains of Battleworld in Secret Wars. It has its differences from the only original storyline, with two of the main ones being the inclusion of Cypher as a prominent character and Magneto marrying Marvel Girl aka Emma Frost instead of Rogue. The Age of Apocalypse's location on Battleworld is known as the Domain of Apocalypse, the most ruthless domain of all.

== Collected editions ==
Title	Material Collected	Publication Date	ISBN
X-Men: Legionquest	Uncanny X-Men #319–321; X-Men Vol. 2 #38–41	March 1996	0785101799
X-Men: Dawn of the Age of Apocalypse	Cable #20; X-Men: Alpha; Age of Apocalypse: The Chosen	March 1996	0785101802
Astonishing X-Men	Astonishing X-Men #1–4	August 1995	0785101276
Factor X	Factor X #1–4	August 1995	0785101284
Generation Next	Generation Next #1–4	August 1995	0785101306
X-Calibre	X-Calibre #1–4	August 1995	0785101322
X-Man	X-Man #1–4	August 1995	0785101330
Amazing X-Men	Amazing X-Men #1–4	September 1995	0785101268
Gambit and the X-Ternals	Gambit and the X-Ternals #1–4	September 1995	0785101292
Weapon X	Weapon X #1–4	September 1995	0785101314
X-Men: Twilight of the Age of Apocalypse	X-Universe #1–2; X-Men: Omega	March 1996	0785101810
X-Men: Age of Apocalypse Prelude	X-Factor #108–109; Uncanny X-Men #319–321; X-Men Vol. 2 #38–41; Cable #20; X-Men: Age of Apocalypse Ashcan Edition	June 2011	0785155082
X-Men: The Complete Age of Apocalypse Epic Book 1	X-Men Chronicles #1–2, Tales from The Age of Apocalypse: By the Light, X-Man #-1, X-Man Annual '96, Tales from The Age of Apocalypse: Sinister Bloodlines, Blink #1–4	May 2006	0785117148
X-Men: The Complete Age of Apocalypse Epic Book 2	X-Men: Alpha, Age of Apocalypse: The Chosen, Generation Next #1, Astonishing X-Men Vol. 1 #1, X-Calibre #1, Gambit and the X-Ternals #1–2, Weapon X Vol. 1 #1–2, Amazing X-Men #1–2, Factor X #1–2, and X-Man #1	August 2006	0785118748
X-Men: The Complete Age of Apocalypse Epic Book 3	X-Calibre #2–3, Astonishing X-Men Vol. 1 #2–4, Generation Next #2–3, X-Man #2–3, Factor X #3, Amazing X-Men #3, Weapon X Vol. 1 #3, Gambit & the X-Ternals #3 and X-Universe #1	April 2006	0785120513
X-Men: The Complete Age of Apocalypse Epic Book 4	Generation Next #4, X-Calibre #4, X-Man #4 and #53–54, Factor X #4, Gambit And The X-Ternals #4, Amazing X-Men #4, Weapon X Vol. 1 #4, X-Universe #2, X-Men: Omega, Blink #4, X-Men: Prime (Only the last 3 Pgs. of Blink #4.)	November 2006	0785120521
X-Men: The Age of Apocalypse Omnibus	Uncanny X-Men #320–321, X-Men Vol. 2 #40–41, Cable #20, X-Men Alpha, Amazing X-Men #1–4, Astonishing X-Men Vol. 1 #1–4, Factor X #1–4, Gambit And The X-Ternals #1–4, Generation Next #1–4, Weapon X Vol. 1 #1–4, X-Calibre #1–4, X-Man #1–4, X-Men Omega, Age of Apocalypse: The Chosen and X-Men Ashcan #2	March 2012	0785159827
X-Men: The Age of Apocalypse Companion Omnibus	X-Men Chronicles #1-2, Tales from The Age of Apocalypse #1-2, X-Man #-1, #53-54, Blink #1-4, X-Universe #1-2, Exiles (2001) #60-61, Age of Apocalypse One-Shot, Age of Apocalypse (2005) #1-6, What If? X-Men Age of Apocalypse, material from Hulk: Broken Worlds #2, X-Man Annual '96, X-Men Prime, X-Men: Endangered Species, Exiles: Days of Then and Now	March 2014	0785185143
X-Men: The New Age of Apocalypse	X-Men: Age of Apocalypse #1–6	July 2005	0785115838
Exiles Vol. 10: Age of Apocalypse	Exiles #59–61, AoA Handbook	August 2005	0785116745
Uncanny X-Force Vol. 3 The Dark Angel Saga Book 1	Uncanny X-Force #8–13	June 2012	078514661X
Uncanny X-Force Vol. 4 The Dark Angel Saga Book 2	Uncanny X-Force #14–18	August 29, 2012	078515888X
Age of Apocalypse Vol. 1: The X-Terminated	Age of Apocalypse #1–6, Uncanny X-Force #19.1	October 2012	0785163026
Age of Apocalypse Vol. 2: Weapon Omega	Age of Apocalypse #7–12	May 2013	0785163042
X-Men: X-Termination	Age of Apocalypse #13–14, X-Treme X-Men Vol. 2 #12–13, X-Termination #1–2, Astonishing X-Men Vol. 3 #60–61	August 2013	0785184430
Age of Apocalypse: Warzones!	Age of Apocalypse Secret Wars #1–5	November 2015	0785198628
X-Men - Age of Apocalypse: Dawn	X-Men Chronicles #1-2, Tales From the Age of Apocalypse #1-2, X-Man #-1, Blink #1-4; material from X-Men: Age of Apocalypse one-shot, X-Man Annual '96	January 1, 2016	0785193502
X-Men - Age of Apocalypse Vol. 1: Alpha	Uncanny X-Men (1963) #320-321, X-Men (1991) #40-41, Cable (1993) #20, X-Men Alpha, Generation Next #1, Astonishing X-Men (1995) #1, Gambit and the X-Ternals #1, Weapon X (1995) #1, Factor X #1, X-Man #1, X-Calibre #1, Amazing X-Men (1995) #1	January 1, 2015	0785193642
X-Men - Age of Apocalypse Vol. 2: Reign	Astonishing X-Men (1995) #2-3, Amazing X-Men (1995) #2-3, Gambit and the X-Ternals #2, Generation Next #2, Weapon X (1995) #2, X-Calibre #2-3, Factor X #2-3, X-Man #2-3, X-Universe #1, material from X-Men: Year of the Mutants Collectors Preview	January 1, 2015	0785193650
X-Men - Age of Apocalypse Vol. 3: Omega	Weapon X (1995) #3-4, Generation Next #3-4, Gambit and the X-Ternals #3-4, Astonishing X-Men (1995) #4, X-Man #4, X-Calibre #4, Factor X #4, Amazing X-Men (1995) #4, X-Universe #2, X-Men Omega, Age of Apocalypse: The Chosen	January 12, 2016	0785193790

== In other media ==
=== Television ===
- In X-Men: The Animated Series, there is an episode, "One Man's Worth" (1995), which directly inspired the Age of Apocalypse comics event.
- Wolverine and the X-Men was originally supposed to be the Age of Apocalypse as an alternate future timeline before the series was cancelled.

=== Film ===
In Deadpool & Wolverine, Deadpool travels to an Age of Apocalypse timeline to recruit its version of Wolverine, but is brutally attacked by the latter.

=== Video Games ===
- The 2001 Game Boy Advance video game X-Men: Reign of Apocalypse is based loosely on the Age of Apocalypse storyline. In this version, the X-Men (consisting of Cyclops, Storm, Rogue, and Wolverine) accidentally travels to an alternate universe where Apocalypse has taken over the world and most of the X-Men have turned into his henchmen. It is later revealed that Apocalypse plans to travel to the regular timeline and take it over as well. In the end, the X-Men defeats Apocalypse and returns to their timeline.
- X-Men Legends II: Rise of Apocalypse is heavily influenced by the Age of Apocalypse storyline, including several characters and concepts from the storyline.
- Marvel: Avengers Alliance featured a special operations titled Apocalypse based on the Age of Apocalypse storyline.
- Marvel Future Fight features a level based on the Age of Apocalypse event, as well as alternate costumes for Magneto, Wolverine, Apocalypse, Beast, Rogue and Cyclops based on their Age of Apocalypse incarnations.
- Marvel Ultimate Alliance 3: The Black Order features an alternate costume for Colossus based on his Age of Apocalypse incarnation.
