= Valerie Cooper =

Marvel Comics character

Valerie "Val" Cooper

Publication information
- Publisher: Marvel Comics
- First appearance: The Uncanny X-Men No. 176 (Dec. 1983)
- Created by: Chris Claremont (writer); John Romita Jr. (artist)

In-story information
- Species: Human
- Team affiliations: Office of National Emergency; Project Wideawake; Commission on Superhuman Activities; Freedom Force; X-Factor; NSA; Secret Empire

Valerie "Val" Cooper is a fictional character appearing in American comic books published by Marvel Comics. The character works for the Office of National Emergency as the liaison for mutant affairs, and has operated teams including X-Factor and Freedom Force.

== Publication history ==
Valerie Cooper was created by Chris Claremont and John Romita Jr., and first appeared in The Uncanny X-Men No. 176 (Dec. 1983).

The character received an entry in The Official Handbook of the Marvel Universe Update '89 No. 2.

Cooper appeared sporadically as a secondary character, often an antagonist, in various Marvel series through the 1980s, primarily Uncanny X-Men written by Claremont and Captain America written by Mark Gruenwald. Writer Peter David and artist Larry Stroman took over X-Factor in 1991 to which Cooper is added as a major character and she was featured in the series' majority until its cancellation in 1998.

Cooper reached additional prominence in the mid-2000s, appearing in dozens of issues in 2006 at the height of Marvel's "Decimation" and "Civil War" events. Peter David returned to write a relaunched X-Factor in 2006 and eventually featured her character in the series during 2007-2009. She made few appearances in the 2010s.

== Fictional character biography ==
Dr. Valerie Cooper is a special National Security Advisor on national security issues, which include superhuman affairs. Originally, she takes a hard-line concern on the problem of the threat that superhumans and mutants posed to the United States. She once claimed to have been inspired to government service by the interesting cases her brother, an FBI agent, encountered in his work.

=== Freedom Force ===
Cooper oversees Mystique's former Brotherhood of Mutants, whose members now operate as government agents as part of Freedom Force. Around this time, Cooper is also involved in a project to create government-sponsored superheroes, which results in Julia Carpenter gaining superpowers and becoming the second Spider-Woman. Cooper assigns Carpenter to join Freedom Force.

Cooper and the Commission on Superhuman Activities are directly involved in the events of the government demanding the Captain America identity under the argument of being their property; Steve Rogers gives up the Captain America identity, and Cooper supervises the recruitment of John Walker and Battlestar as the new Captain America and Bucky respectively. Cooper's next duty is to hire Forge to create a machine to detect mutant powers.

The Freedom Force project is shut down when several members are killed or go missing after being abandoned in Kuwait. During the Muir Island Saga, Cooper's mind falls under the Shadow King's control. The Shadow King orders Cooper to shoot Mystique, but she refuses and shoots herself instead. Cooper is critically injured, but survives. Mystique goes undercover disguised as Cooper in an attempt to foil the Shadow King.

=== X-Factor ===
After witnessing first-hand the deeds of mutants throughout the years, Cooper gives the concept of a government sponsored team another shot. She is able to convince several X-Men members and their associates to form a new X-Factor team. This new team, consisting of Havok, Polaris, Wolfsbane, Multiple Man, Quicksilver and Strong Guy replaces Freedom Force, with Cooper acting as government liaison to the team. Soon afterward, Cooper is once again mentally controlled, this time by the Acolytes. She is freed from the Acolytes' control, but her relationship with X-Factor is damaged when it is revealed that she knew of Project Wideawake, a Sentinel project developed by the United States government. Cooper hands leadership of X-Factor directly to Forge.

=== Commission on Superhuman Activities ===
Cooper returns to the Commission on Superhuman Activities. In this position, she assists the X-Men on several occasions. She later takes Charles Xavier to a government facility following the Onslaught incident. Cooper is instrumental in helping the old Thunderbolts defeat Henry Peter Gyrich and negotiates for the team to receive a presidential pardon.

=== O*N*E ===
Cooper helps establish the Office of National Emergency (O*N*E), an official government branch dedicated to preparation and defense against superhuman threats; not much later, she becomes its deputy director. The O*N*E, with its first line of defense being the Sentinel Squad O*N*E, becomes responsible for the mutant refugee camp established at the X-Mansion after most of the world's mutants lose their powers during the Decimation event. Many mutants join the camp willingly, while some are secretly coerced into it.

== Other versions ==
=== Age of Apocalypse ===
An alternate universe version of Valerie Cooper appears in the Age of Apocalypse tie-in series Factor-X. This version is a member of an underground resistance group that aids refugees in escaping from North America to Europe.

=== GeNext ===
A possible future version of Valerie Cooper appears in GeNext. By this time, she has become the United Nations' liaison to the Xavier School.

=== Ultimate Marvel ===
An alternate universe version of Valerie Cooper from Earth-1610 makes a minor appearance in Ultimate Fallout #4. This version is a government official involved in discovering the mutant gene's origins.

== In other media ==
Valerie Cooper appears in X-Men '97, voiced by Catherine Disher.
