= Forge (character) =

Marvel Comics fictional character

- Forge as depicted in X-Factor #106 (September 1994). Art by Steve Lightle.

Publication information
- Publisher: Marvel Comics
- First appearance: The Uncanny X-Men #184 (Aug. 1984)
- Created by: Chris Claremont (writer); John Romita Jr. (artist)

In-story information
- Species: Human Mutant
- Team affiliations: United States Army; X-Men; X-Factor; X-Corporation; X-Force
- Notable aliases: Maker, Genesis
- Abilities: Superhuman intuitive talent at inventing; Genius-level intelligence; Various mystical abilities; Skilled marksmanship

Forge is a superhero appearing in American comic books published by Marvel Comics, most commonly in association with the X-Men. A mutant with an unsurpassed brilliance in technology, he has had a lengthy career as a government weapons contractor. Created by writer Chris Claremont and artist John Romita Jr., Forge first appeared in The Uncanny X-Men #184 (August 1984).

Forge shared a romantic relationship with Storm and a brief affair with Mystique, which led him to associate with the X-Men and thus enhancing the technology at the X-Mansion. He was also a member of X-Factor.

== Publication history ==
Forge was created by writer Chris Claremont and artist John Romita Jr., and first appeared in The Uncanny X-Men #184 (August 1984).

Claremont's outline for the character's debut identifies Forge as Daniel Lone Eagle, although that name has not been used for the character in Marvel canon.

Forge appeared in Uncanny X-Men as a recurring character to the team, as well as five issues of Rom, and issues of other X-Men related titles. After the events of The Fall of the Mutants, Forge remained behind in Dallas, appearing in two issues of New Mutants. Forge assisted the Muir Island X-Men, before leaving to find the missing X-Men. He participated in the Days of Future Present, X-Tinction Agenda, and the Muir Island Saga storylines. Forge joins the team, before being reduced to a support role to the X-Men teams, and finally leaving the mansion. Forge joined X-Factor in issue 93, and left the team in issue 136, last appearing in the series in issue 145. He appeared sparingly in X-Men comics as technical support, and a recurring role in the Mystique solo series and New X-Men.

As part of Marvel NOW!, Forge returns as a member of Cable's X-Force. After the conclusion of the series, Forge played a supporting role in Storm (Vol. 3) as well as a team member in Extraordinary X-Men.

Forge appeared in many issues during the Krakoan Age, going on to join the island's X-Men, before leaving the team in the 2023 Hellfire Gala. During the From the Ashes relaunch, Forge began the new X-Force team.

== Fictional character biography ==
=== Early years ===
Forge is a mutant with an innate superhuman talent for invention and is an intuitive genius. He is a Native American of the Cheyenne nation. Despite being trained as a medicine man, he primarily relies upon technology rather than mysticism to accomplish his tasks. This causes conflict with his teacher, Naze, and ultimately leads him to leave and join the military.

While in the army, Forge served in the Vietnam War. After rising in the ranks to become a sergeant, he was asked to join S.H.I.E.L.D. Forge declines, seeing his need is in Vietnam. During his second tour of duty in the war, his comrades are killed by enemy troops. In anger, he uses their spirits to summon a band of demons to destroy the opposition. Forge, concerned about his former comrades, decides to order a B-52 bombing on his position to close the portal from the world of the unliving. The bombs destroy the spirits, but he is injured as well, losing his right leg and right hand. This action allows the demon called the Adversary to come to Earth. After this, Forge is hesitant to employ his mystical abilities.

Years later, Forge creates cybernetic replacements for his lost limbs. When Tony Stark stops making advanced weaponry for the US government, Forge is hired as an employee of the Defense Department. One of his earliest commissions is to design a weapon to detect the Dire Wraiths. Subsequently, Forge constructs a device capable of neutralizing mutant powers. Henry Peter Gyrich, an agent of the National Security Council, takes the device, following orders from the President. Forge protests because the device is untested and extremely dangerous to use. The device is used against Rogue, who was wanted for allegedly killing a S.H.I.E.L.D. agent. However, the device instead removes the powers of her teammate, Storm.

=== Romance ===
Forge rescues Storm after she falls into a river. Forge brings her back to his home in Dallas, Texas. During her recovery, romantic feelings develop between them. When she finds out he is the person who developed the device which removed her abilities, Storm leaves. With the help of Rom the Space Knight, Forge creates a large-scale version of the Neutralizer and uses it to send the Dire Wraiths to Limbo.

After saving the world, Forge destroys all remaining Neutralizers and focuses on ridding the Earth of the Adversary. The Adversary, in the shape of Naze, convinces Storm that Forge was driven insane by her leaving and is planning to open a gate to hell. Storm tries to kill Forge, but the moment she stabs him she sees that she was tricked. During the events of the Fall of the Mutants crossover, the Adversary banishes Storm and Forge to another dimension devoid of human life. Storm and Forge spend an unknown amount of time there, rekindling their romance. Forge restores Storm's abilities and uses them to power a gate back home.

=== X-Men ===
Forge and Storm arrive on Earth and join the X-Men in their battle with the Adversary. Forge is required to sacrifice nine willing lives to banish the Adversary forever; eight X-Men and Madelyne Pryor volunteer and die in the casting of Forge's spell. The goddess Roma intervenes and secretly restores the X-Men to life. Magik, younger sister of X-Man Colossus, sees Forge as responsible for the death of her brother and attacks Forge, who fights back using his knowledge of Native American sorcery. Feeling guilty over his involvement, Forge allows Magik to stab him with her Soulsword in the hopes it will kill him. Instead, its effects cause both mutants to come to terms with their shortcomings.

==== Destiny ====
Forge, still unaware of the X-Men's resurrection, fights alongside Mystique's Freedom Force and an interim team of X-Men against the group of villains, the Reavers, at Muir Island. Forge creates a rifle that deactivates the cyborg enemy Skullbuster and forces the rest of the Reavers to retreat. During the battle, Destiny is killed, but not before she foresees that Forge and Mystique will one day love one another, a fact that both parties find implausible. Mystique blames him for Destiny's death.

Banshee approaches Forge, acting on a lead given by Polaris that the team is still alive. Forge is convinced by visions that those X-Men are still alive. The two of them plan to travel the world looking for their missing friends, starting with Storm in Cairo, Egypt, but their plane is ambushed by the Fenris Twins. Later, Forge and Banshee go to the ruins of the Xavier Mansion (destroyed during the events of Inferno) and rescue Jean Grey from a gang of Masque's Morlocks. They finally learn that the X-Men are indeed alive, but they have faked their deaths. Forge and Banshee eventually find the X-Men and become full-time members.

==== End of romance ====
After the events of the Muir Island Saga, Forge becomes a member of the X-Mansion's "support team". He redesigns the Danger Room and the Blackbird jet.

With the arrival of Bishop and Storm's constant involvement with the team, Forge and Storm's relationship becomes rocky. Forge leaves the X-Men after coming to believe Storm would have rejected his proposal of marriage. The pair continue to have an on-again, off-again relationship, until it ends completely. Forge returns home to Dallas to resume work as a government contractor and to help with the mental care of Mystique, who is becoming schizophrenic. During her stay, Forge and Mystique grow closer and have an affair.

=== X-Factor ===
Forge replaces Valerie Cooper as the new government liaison for the mutant superhero team X-Factor. Forge goes on his second cosmic adventure while with X-Factor, venturing to the far side of the sun with dozens of other superheroes in the incident known as the Infinity Crusade. Forge is personally affected as one of his team, Wolfsbane, is kidnapped by the villain the Goddess. Forge ends up orbiting a duplicate Earth in an escape pod, along with the vigilante Nomad.

When the team begins to experience personal problems, Forge takes a more active involvement, gradually become the leader of the remaining members. In this role, he sees the mutant criminals Mystique and Sabretooth forced to become unwilling members of his team. Forge also comes to terms with his heritage when the Adversary returns. With Naze's assistance, Forge defeats the Adversary by combining technology created using his mutant powers with his mystical abilities. After X-Factor is tricked into hunting and battling former team member Multiple Man, Forge severs the team's involvement with the government and leads them underground. Forge and Mystique become more attracted to one another while working together as members of the team, with Forge ultimately falling in love with Mystique. During their time underground, another former X-Factor member, Strong Guy, awakens from a coma that he suffered due to his powers placing stress on his heart. Forge creates a device that saves Strong Guy's life. Forge and other team members are severely injured after Sabretooth betrays and attacks the team. Mystique escapes her forced membership while Forge is recuperating. After recovering from his injuries, Forge refuses to become a member of a new X-Factor line-up led by former team leader Havok, as he feels that Havok is no longer trustworthy. This new version of X-Factor disbands shortly thereafter. For a time, Forge is not active on any mutant groups, though he briefly works as support staff at the X-Men's mansion.

=== Xavier's Underground ===
Forge takes part in Xavier's Underground movement. He works with a former X-Factor member, Multiple Man, in Genosha. Afterwards, Forge returns to the X-Men and briefly becomes a mentor to Danielle Moonstar.

Later, Charles Xavier asks him for help in locating Mystique whom he needs for a clandestine mission. Forge also helps Cannonball and Siryn find Cable with the aid of Deadpool. Forge builds a pair of gauntlets for New X-Men team member Surge; afterward, he returns to his lab to build a Nimrod unit with the primary objective of protecting mutants and secondary objective of protecting humans. He then encounters a time-traveling Nimrod suffering from severe damage which demands that Forge fix him. This version of Nimrod comes from an alternate future, and had compelled an alternate version of Forge (married to Storm, with two children) to build a device to allow it to travel to the past. The alternate Forge had seemingly complied, but actually built a device to send Nimrod not only back in time, but also to another timeline, and to disable him upon arrival. Nimrod threatens to harm this reality's Storm, and Forge offers to transfer Nimrod into his own version of the Sentinel, to which Nimrod agrees. The transfer is interrupted by the arrival of Surge and the rest of the New X-Men, who had received Forge's distress call through Surge's own gauntlets; in the ensuing battle, Forge helps them defeat Nimrod.

=== Messiah Complex ===
After Forge sends Jamie Madrox and Layla to the future, he goes on a mission at Cyclops' behest to rendezvous with the other X-Men, who are on their way to confront Sinister's forces. He is shot by a seemingly treacherous Bishop. He is seen later in the recovery room along with other injured X-Men.

=== Divided We Stand ===
Forge suffers an array of injuries, including serious head trauma, from Bishop's attack during his mad quest to murder the first mutant child following M-Day. Bishop steals several time travel devices that Forge is reverse engineering. Throughout his recovery, Forge is obsessed with recreating his notes and research on these devices. Fixated to an unhealthy degree on this project, Forge shuts himself away in his home at Eagle Plaza to devote all his time to this work. However, before he begins, he enhances his home's defense systems to ensure that he never falls victim to such an attack again.

=== Ghost Box ===
Forge returns in Astonishing X-Men #29, when the X-Men fly to his complex on Mount Wundagore to confront him about his apparent role in an inter-dimensional invasion of Earth. After following a trail of mysteriously genetically created mutants and death, the X-Men track down Forge, who reveals his madness. He wants to save the world from the Annexation, an invasion from a parallel world on the other side of the Ghost Box, the trans-dimensional teleporter. He plans to send the X-Men to the parallel universe that is home to the Ghost Boxes to destroy them before the Annexation begins. The X-Men try to talk Forge down, but he rebukes them and forcibly opens the Ghost Box, risking all life on Earth. Thanks to the assistance of Abigail Brand and Beast, a laser is shot into the opening of the Ghost Box. Before everything is destroyed, Ororo offers Forge a chance to come back with them. A bitter Forge rejects her offer, and stays in his complex as it is destroyed.

=== Cable and X-Force ===
As part of Marvel NOW!, Forge is shown to still be alive following the destruction of his complex. He has apparently restored his original right hand (but still uses a prosthetic for his right leg). Forge is approached by Cable (after he used his telepathic abilities to help cure Forge of insanity) to be in a new X-Force team created by Cable.

=== All-New, All-Different Marvel ===
As part of the All-New, All-Different Marvel, Forge appears as a member of Storm's X-Men as their primary technician even though his relationship with Storm is awkward and strained. Forge programmed Cerebra into the body of a Sentinel with the capability to showcase human emotion and the ability to teleport along with mutant detection so she could be a bridge between Earth and Limbo.

=== Dawn of X ===
Professor X tasks Forge with modifying Cerebro so it can store backups for mutant minds. Forge would later assist the Marauders with recovering his mutant power Neutralizers after they were co-opted by the Russians.

In Destiny of X, Forge is selected to be part of the new X-Men team during the second Hellfire Gala.

== Powers and abilities ==
Forge is a mutant with a superhuman intuitive talent for inventing mechanical devices, backed up by the ability to visually perceive mechanical energy in action. This power allows him to instinctively recognize the potential and functional uses of any machine or technological device in his visual range, a skill that combined with his natural intelligence gives him the ability to conceive, design and build highly advanced mechanical devices; and operate, modify and disassemble existing technology or create countermeasures for it. Forge's superhuman talent for invention does not mean that he is of a superhuman intellect; even a genius at invention must for the most part consciously work out the theoretical principles behind the invention and then the design of the invention itself through a series of logical steps. In Forge's case, however, many of these logical steps are worked out by his subconscious mind. Forge himself is sometimes not fully aware of how he created a device and must disassemble it to determine how it works.

Forge wore synthetic stretch fabric backed by micro-thin bulletproof Kevlar and thermal insulation while a member of the X-Men. He sometimes employs devices of his own invention. Most notable among these was his Neutralizer gun that could suppress superhuman mutant abilities. The only known examples of this device have been destroyed. Forge has also invented a handheld scanning device that can detect the presence of superhuman beings or aliens.

Forge has knowledge of many scientific and technological fields. He also possesses various mystical abilities such as spell casting through mystical training, though he rarely uses them. He possesses extensive knowledge of Native American magic.

His bionic-robotic right hand (which he has since restored to its original organic state) and right leg often contain concealed weapons and devices that he can use in combat. In addition, they can be outfitted with computer interfaces and plasma blasters. His skill as a hand-to-hand combatant and as a marksman from his military training were so impressive that Nick Fury offered him a job with S.H.I.E.L.D.

== Reception ==
- In 2014, Entertainment Weekly ranked Forge 38th in their "Let's rank every X-Man ever" list.
- In 2018, CBR.com ranked Forge 30th in their "Age Of Apocalypse: The 30 Strongest Characters In Marvel's Coolest Alternate World" list.
- In 2018, CBR.com ranked Forge 19th in their "20 Most Powerful Mutants From The '80s" list.

== Other versions ==
Many alternate versions of Forge have appeared throughout the character's publication history.

- In Age of Apocalypse, Forge is the leader of the Outcasts, a rebellion against Apocalypse, whose body has been ravaged by years of combat and left entirely cybernetic except for the right half of his face. Forge becomes a mentor and father figure to Nate Grey before being killed by Mister Sinister.
- In Exiles, the Forge of Earth-2814 is a member of the Exiles who is Caucasian and sports a fully mechanical right arm.
- In Marvel Zombies, Forge is a member of Magneto's Acolytes whose daughter was killed by Malcolm Cortez.
- In Old Man Logan, Forge is one of the few surviving members of the X-Men, having been absent when Mysterio tricked Wolverine into killing his fellow X-Men.
- In X-Men: Ronin, Forge is a Japanese police officer and the creator of the Sentinel Force.
- In the Ultimate Marvel universe, Forge is an Indian American member of the Brotherhood of Mutants.

== In other media ==
=== Television ===
- Forge appears in X-Men: The Animated Series, voiced by Marc Strange. This version is the leader of X-Factor. Additionally, an alternate timeline version that serves as the leader of a mutant resistance also appears in the series.
  - Forge appears in X-Men '97, voiced by Gil Birmingham.
- Forge appears in X-Men: Evolution, voiced by Sam Vincent. This version possesses the additional ability to transform one of his hands into a multi-tooled robotic device and was trapped in a pocket dimension for three decades due to one of his inventions backfiring until he is rescued by Nightcrawler in the present.
- Forge appears in Wolverine and the X-Men, voiced by Roger Craig Smith. This version is an inexperienced member of the X-Men who serves as their engineer and mission analyst.

=== Video games ===
- Forge appears as a non-playable character (NPC) in X-Men II: The Fall of the Mutants.
- Forge appears in Storm's ending in X-Men: Children of the Atom.
- Forge appears in Storm's ending in X-Men vs. Street Fighter.
- Forge appears as a playable character in X-Men: Mutant Academy 2, voiced by Marc Strange.
- Forge appears as a playable character in X-Men: Next Dimension, voiced by Carlos Ferro.
- Forge appears as a NPC in X-Men Legends, voiced by Lou Diamond Phillips.
- Forge appears as a NPC in X-Men Legends II: Rise of Apocalypse, voiced again by Lou Diamond Phillips.
- Forge appears as a NPC in X-Men: Destiny, voiced by Phil LaMarr.
- Forge makes a cameo appearance in Strider Hiryu's ending in Ultimate Marvel vs. Capcom 3.
- Forge appears in Marvel Heroes, voiced by Carlos Alazraqui.
- Forge appears in Marvel Snap.
- Forge appears in Marvel Cosmic Invasion, voiced by Kerry Shale.
