= Strong Guy =

Marvel Comics fictional character

- Strong Guy and Polaris as depicted in X-Men Series 1 (1992) Impel Marketing trading cards. Art by Jim Lee.

Publication information
- Publisher: Marvel Comics
- First appearance: The New Mutants #29 (July 1985)
- Created by: Chris Claremont; Bill Sienkiewicz

In-story information
- Alter ego: Guido Carosella
- Species: Human mutant
- Team affiliations: New Mutants; X-Factor Investigations; Singularity Investigations; X-Factor; The Arena
- Abilities: Ability to rechannel kinetic energy into physical strength

Strong Guy (Guido Carosella) is a fictional superhero appearing in American comic books published by Marvel Comics. He was created by Chris Claremont and Bill Sienkiewicz and first appeared in The New Mutants #29 (July 1985).

== Publication history ==
Strong Guy first appeared in The New Mutants #29 (July 1985) as Lila Cheney's bodyguard, known only as Guido. He joined X-Factor in X-Factor #71, and was first called Strong Guy in X-Factor #72. Guido's struggles with picking a codename are used for comic effect in the story, and X-Factor writer Peter David admitted that in real life he had difficulty coming up with a decent codename for the character.

== Fictional character biography ==
=== Early life ===
Born in Rhinebeck, New York to working-class Italian parents, Guido Carosella gained a fortune in a settlement when his parents were killed by falling space debris. Skinny and shy, Guido's mutant powers were triggered in childhood when an incident with schoolyard bullies and being hit by a bus ended in his body becoming disproportionately large and muscular, separating him further from his peers. He had the love and support of his aunt and uncle, who took him in after his parents' deaths. Guido coped with his emotional and physical pain caused by his mutation by developing an outgoing "public face", rarely letting even those close to him see him in discomfort.

During the incident with the bus, another boy, Charlie Ronalds, was hurt by Guido's flailing. Due to luck, Charlie survived with only a slight limp. He would later become the villain Charon.

=== Lila Cheney and Muir Island ===
After losing much of his fortune, Guido begins to take on jobs that allow him to maintain his luxurious lifestyle. This leads to him becoming a long-time roadie and bouncer for the mutant musician Lila Cheney. He later finds Dazzler near Lila Cheney's Malibu house, and helps rescue her from drowning. Guido is among the mutants living on Muir Island who are mentally controlled by the telepath Shadow King. After the Shadow King is defeated, several of the Muir Island mutants, with the help of Valerie Cooper, are recruited to form a new X-Factor, a team of government operatives.

=== X-Factor ===
Guido's teammates are Havok, Polaris, Wolfsbane, and Quicksilver. Required to come up with a codename, Guido announces himself as "Strong Guy" at an X-Factor press conference after hearing a reporter say, "He must be the strong guy! Every super-group has a strong guy!".

Mister Sinister manipulates Strong Guy into destroying the Washington Monument while fighting Slab. With X-Factor, he aids the American-supported Trans-Sabal government in a war against rebels, and fights the Hulk, then battles the Mutant Liberation Front. He also fights the Brotherhood of Mutants.

Strong Guy and X-Force become involved in a confrontation between Lila Cheney and the alien K'Lanti, who plant bombs throughout Madripoor. While disarming the last bomb, Strong Guy absorbs its energy and suffers a severe heart attack. He spends time in suspended animation until Jamie Madrox returns and frees him. However, Strong Guy remains in poor health until Forge creates a device to heal him. Strong Guy chooses to accompany Lila Cheney and her band instead of rejoining X-Factor.

=== X-Factor Investigations ===
In Peter David's run on X-Factor, in the aftermath of Marvel's "Decimation" storyline, Strong Guy moves to New York City to become an enforcer for Jamie Madrox's detective agency, X-Factor Investigations. In the process, he rejoins many of his former teammates from the previous incarnation of X-Factor.

Some time later, Valerie Cooper contacts Strong Guy and offers him a job as sheriff of Mutant Town. Guido informs Jamie Madrox that he will be taking the job, but changes his mind when Mutant Town is destroyed by the villain Arcade.

Strong Guy is hired to protect J. Jonah Jameson from super-powered assassins. He is shot through the heart and overexerts himself stopping a Mandroid from falling onto a crowd. Strong Guy is rushed to the hospital, but the doctors are unable to save him due to the damage to his heart. A few minutes later, he miraculously revives, showing no injuries. It is revealed that Layla Miller resurrected Strong Guy, who no longer has a soul. As a result, he begins acting more aggressive, and after a failed date with M, quits the group, only to return during the Hell on Earth War where he works for Mephisto against the other Hell Lords. By the end of the event, he murders Wolfsbane's son Tier to become the Supreme Hell Lord. Red Hulk eventually convinces Strong Guy to abandon the position, but he remains in Hell to regain his soul.

=== Return to Earth ===
Strong Guy returns in Death of X, along with other mutants, helping the X-Men.

In Secret Empire, Strong Guy is seen among the inhabitants of the mutant nation of New Tian following Hydra's takeover of the United States.

=== New Mutants: Dead Souls ===
At some point, Strong Guy joins Magik's team of New Mutants, and is revealed to have regained his soul with Magik's help. He also reconciles with Wolfsbane after he apologizes for killing her son. While fighting with Tran Coy Manh, Strong Guy is able to take a hold of him and Magik is forced to banish both of them to Limbo, where time passes differently. Magik is able to summon him back when she is attacked by her teammates, who are infected with the Transmode virus and are controlled by an insane Karma. However, despite only a few days passing in the real world, it has been years from Strong Guy's perspective. During the fight, he suffers from a heart attack, though Danielle Moonstar saves him by infecting him with the virus.

=== Death and return ===
A still techno-organic Strong Guy is held captive by the Office of National Emergency (O*N*E), who place him inside a Sentinel. He is rescued by Cyclops and Wolverine. After O*N*E kills several duplicates of Multiple Man, Strong Guy sacrifices himself to save the others by absorbing massive amounts of energy. Strong Guy is later seen on Krakoa, having been revived by the Krakoan council like many other previously dead mutants.

== Powers and abilities ==
Strong Guy possesses superhuman strength, stamina, and durability. He can augment his strength by absorbing kinetic energy, but cannot store the energy he absorbs for very long and must physically expel it within 90 seconds to prevent it from permanently distorting his body. Strong Guy's powers put strain on his heart, which he received a surgical implant to alleviate. When Strong Guy's powers first manifested, he was unable to expel his energy in time, warping his body and causing him to appear top-heavy. Strong Guy's maximum strength level is such that he has sufficient power to move the Blob, and briefly stand toe to toe with the Hulk, although the latter's rage-enhanced strength was so powerful that the energy of channeling merely one blow put Strong Guy in danger of a heart attack afterwards. Strong Guy is formidable at hand-to-hand combat in the style of street fighting. In addition, he is a skilled actor and comedian.

== Reception ==
- In 2014, Entertainment Weekly ranked Strong Guy 94th in their "Let's rank every X-Man ever" list.
- In 2018, Comic Book Resources (CBR) ranked Strong Guy 8th in their "Age Of Apocalypse: The 30 Strongest Characters In Marvel's Coolest Alternate World" list.

== Other versions ==
An alternate universe version of Strong Guy from Earth-295 appears in Age of Apocalypse.

== In other media ==
=== Television ===
- Strong Guy makes non-speaking appearances in X-Men: The Animated Series as a member of X-Factor.
- Strong Guy appears in X-Men '97, voiced by Adrian Hough.

=== Video games ===
Strong Guy appears as a playable card in Marvel Snap.

=== Merchandise ===
- In 1993, Toy Biz released an action figure of Strong Guy sporting his X-Factor uniform as part of their X-Men series.
- Marvel and Planet Studios released a 1.25 inch/3.175 cm Full Figure pin of Strong Guy, 1994.
- Bowen Designs produced a Strong Guy Mini-Bust, sculpted by Jeremy Pelletier, July 2012. It was released in Phase 5, Bust #288.
- Hasbro released a 6" scale action figure of Strong Guy as the Build-A-Figure for a wave of Deadpool and X-Men characters in their Marvel Legends line in 2020.
