= Mystique (character) =

Marvel Comics fictional character

- Textless variant cover of X-Men (March 2020) #4. Art by Shannon Maer.

Publication information
- Publisher: Marvel Comics
- First appearance: Cameo appearance: Ms. Marvel #16 (May 1978); Full appearance: Ms. Marvel #18 (July 1978)
- Created by: Chris Claremont; Dave Cockrum

In-story information
- Species: Human mutant
- Team affiliations: Brotherhood of Mutants; X-Men; Astonishing Avengers; Chevaliers training squad; Dark X-Men; DARPA; Freedom Force; Marauders; Mossad; The Hand; X-Corps; X-Factor; Lethal Legion; Hellfire Club; Weapon X-Force; Wolverines; S.H.I.E.L.D.; Mutant Task Force; Magneto's X-Men; Quiet Council of Krakoa
- Notable aliases: Raven Darkhölme; Sherlock Holmes; Leni Zauber; Mallory Brickman; Surge; Foxx; Amichai Benvenisti
- Abilities: Shapeshifting; Enhanced strength, speed, agility, reflexes, flexibility, stamina and durability; Accelerated healing; Slowed aging; Skilled martial artist and hand-to-hand combatant; Expert marksman

Mystique is a character appearing in American comic books published by Marvel Comics. Created by writer Chris Claremont and artist David Cockrum, the character first appeared in Ms. Marvel #16 (April 1978). A mutant born with superhuman abilities, Mystique is a shapeshifter who can mimic the appearance and voice of any person. Her natural appearance includes blue skin, red hair, and yellow eyes.

Typically portrayed as a foe of the X-Men, Mystique has been both a supervillain and an antiheroine who is often depicted as a high ranking member of the Brotherhood of Mutants, having both served and led the organization in its fight against humanity by assassinating several important people involved in mutant affairs. Stated to be over 100 years old, she commonly lives under the assumed name Raven Darkhölme. Mystique is the wife of Destiny, the biological mother of the villain Graydon Creed, the adoptive mother of the X-Men heroine Rogue, and the biological father of the X-Men hero Nightcrawler, whom she conceived with her wife Destiny while in one of her male forms.

In live-action, Mystique has been portrayed by Rebecca Romijn and Jennifer Lawrence in 20th Century Fox's X-Men film series (2000–2019). Romijn will reprise the role in the Marvel Cinematic Universe film Avengers: Doomsday (2026).

== Publication history ==
=== 1970s and 1980s ===
Mystique was created by David Cockrum. Chris Claremont saw Cockrum's design, dubbed the character "Mystique", and, with Cockrum's permission, set her in Ms. Marvel #16 (May 1978). The character's true appearance was revealed in Ms. Marvel #18 (June 1978). Claremont named the character in reference to Betty Friedan's book The Feminine Mystique (1963).

Mystique became the villain who appears in the Uncanny X-Men title most frequently during the period of Claremont's authorship. She first becomes an antagonist of the X-Men in the "Days of Future Past" storyline in Uncanny X-Men #141-142 (January-February 1981). Destiny, Mystique's partner who can see the future, is also introduced in this story. In the story, Mystique forms a new Brotherhood of Mutants and tries to assassinate Senator Robert Kelly. The character made her first cover appearance in The Avengers Annual #10 (October 1981), which established that she is the adoptive mother of Rogue, who she also recruited to the Brotherhood of Mutants. In the story, Mystique instigates Rogue to steal the powers of Carol Danvers. Mystique then appears along with the Brotherhood in Dazzler #22–23 (Dec. 1982-Jan. 1983). Mystique reappears in The Uncanny X-Men #177–178 (Jan.–Feb. 1984), in which she eventually accepts Rogue's defection from the Brotherhood to the X-Men. In Uncanny X-Men #199 (November 1985), Mystique revamps the Brotherhood into Freedom Force, a now-government affiliated group that attempts to counteract mutant terrorism. The group is disbanded in Uncanny X-Men #254-255 (December 1989-January 1990), and Destiny appears to be killed.

=== 1990s and after ===
Wolverine #51 (February 1992) establishes that Mystique has an intimate relationship with Wolverine. Sabretooth #1 (August 1993) demonstrates that Mystique also has a long-standing relationship with Wolverine's archenemy, Sabretooth. X-Men Unlimited #4 (1994) reveals that Mystique is a parent of Nightcrawler (initially presumed to be his mother). In X-Factor #112-114 (1995), Mystique joins the group X-Factor. She establishes a relationship with Forge in X-Factor #136 (August 1997). In X-Men (vol. 2) #93 (October 1999), she adopts a new identity as a successful fashion model, becoming wealthy. She goes mad and re-forms the Brotherhood in X-Men vol. 2 #105 (October 2000) and Uncanny X-Men #388 (January 2001).

In X-Treme X-Men #1 (July 2001), written by Claremont, it is suggested that Mystique was the historical model for Sherlock Holmes. In Uncanny X-Men #403-406 (April-July 2002), Mystique poses as a reformed mutant criminal named Surge and joins the X-Corps, betraying and seriously wounding Banshee. A story published in Uncanny X-Men #428-434 (2003-2004) establishes that Mystique had an intimate relationship with Azazel, the father of ancient race of mutants. Mystique appeared in her own miniseries from 2003 to 2005.

In X-Men vol. 2 #171 (August 2005), Mystique infiltrates the X-Men, under the guise of a young mutant named Foxx. Mystique appeared as the antagonist of Wolverine, her former lover, throughout the "Get Mystique" storyline written by Jason Aaron in Wolverine vol. 3, issues #62-65 (February-May 2008). In Wolverine vol. 4 #9 (July 2011), Wolverine kills her and she is resurrected by the Hand. In the Reign of X series (2020-2022), Mystique causes problems for the Krakoa mutant nation because of her desire to resurrect Destiny, despite a prohibition on restoring people to life who can see the future.

=== Parentage of Nightcrawler and queer identity ===
In an interview conducted in July 2006, Claremont said that he intended Mystique and Destiny to be Nightcrawler's biological parents, with Mystique having morphed into a male body for the act of conception. However, Marvel did not agree, because at that time the Comics Code Authority prohibited the explicit portrayal of gay or bisexual characters. This storyline would then be made canon in November 2023.

== Fictional character biography ==
Mystique's origins remain unknown: her shapeshifting powers mean that her true age remains enigmatic. At the turn of the century, she lived in a male guise as Sherlock Holmes, a "consulting detective" who established a romantic relationship with her reality's version of Irene Adler. Later, in mid-20th century, she became the lover of Sabretooth. The result of this brief affair was the birth of Graydon Creed, who was not a mutant himself. Disappointed, Mystique abandoned him. Graydon grew to hate his parents, and eventually extends his hatred to all mutants, becoming leader of the mutant-hating organization Friends of Humanity. At the height of his political ascension, Graydon is assassinated by an unknown shooter; the shooter is later revealed to be a time traveling version of Mystique as part of a convoluted time paradox.

Mystique is later married to Baron Christian Wagner (older sources give his name as Count Eric Wagner), an affluent German nobleman. He proves to be a loving husband, but also infertile. Mystique resorts to using her shapeshifting for numerous affairs and arranges for Irene Adler, her true lover, to be hired on as a maid. Mystique then sleeps with fellow mutant Azazel, pretending to be seduced. Azazel states that he is ruler of "an island nation off the coast of Bermuda: La Isla des Demonas", The Island of Demons. He is later revealed to be immortal and the father of an ancient race of mutants known as the Neyaphem, active since 2000 BC.

Mystique appears to become pregnant, but her husband becomes suspicious and suggests a blood test to verify whether the child is his; Mystique kills him. It is revealed that she was using her mutant abilities to simulate a pregnancy in sympathy with Destiny, who was actually the one pregnant. Mystique had in fact, as a deeper function of her powers, replicated the genetics of Azazel and Christian, among other men, to essentially create her own sperm. She assumed a male form and impregnated Destiny.

Destiny gives birth to a baby boy with black hair, yellow eyes, blue skin, and a pointed tail. The locals consider Mystique and the child to be demons and attempt to kill them. Mystique escapes but hides her son briefly, intending to help Destiny escape then return for him; by the time Mystique returned for their son, he is missing. Unbeknownst to her, Azazel finds the boy and gives him to the Roma sorceress Margali Szardos, who names him "Kurt Wagner".

Mystique learned that conceiving Kurt was in part a manipulation by Destiny to produce a child Azazel would assume was his own. Destiny foresaw that Kurt would sabotage Azazel's attempt for world domination. The pain of loss prompted them to seek out Charles Xavier to erase their memories of Kurt. She develops false memories about the incident. Those beliefs apparently also drove her continued coldness towards Kurt despite being reunited for a significant amount of time, fully aware he was her lost son. Destiny is unaware she gave birth to Kurt; and even Xavier deletes his memory of this encounter. Mystique revealed the true events to Nightcrawler after her true memories reasserted themselves some time after resisting a psychic push by Xavier and falling off a cliff at the third Hellfire Gala. The experience left her mentally unstable, until she was aided by Nightcrawler's 'Hopesword', which undid Xavier's modifications.

Mystique becomes the adoptive mother of the fourteen-year-old girl Rogue. Rogue had run away from her home in rural Caldecott County, Mississippi. The girl was living alone in a wooded area when Mystique found her. Destiny foresees that Rogue will be important to them and Mystique takes her in. She and Destiny raise the girl.

Around this time, Mystique adopts "Raven Darkhölme" as her legal name and joins the Defense Advanced Research Projects Agency (DARPA) in the Department of Defense, rising to the position of Deputy Director. This gives her access to military secrets and advanced weaponry, both of which she uses for her own criminal and subversive purposes. In this position, she attempts the theft of the Centurion weaponry from S.H.I.E.L.D. As Destiny had predicted that Ms. Marvel was a danger to Rogue, she spied on Carol Danvers and Ms. Marvel for some time prior to beating her lover Michael Barnett to death, and sought to kill Ms. Marvel.

To help her in her criminal activities, Mystique forms her own incarnation of the Brotherhood of Evil Mutants, consisting of herself, Avalanche, Blob, Destiny, and Pyro. The Brotherhood attempts to assassinate Senator Robert Kelly, an anti-mutant politician. The X-Men thwart the assassination attempt, and all of the Brotherhood except Mystique herself are incarcerated.

Rogue is trained by Mystique and eventually joins the Brotherhood of Evil Mutants. Her mutant power is the ability to absorb the memories, personality, and skills or powers of whomever she touches. To free the other members of the Brotherhood, Mystique concocts a plan involving Rogue absorbing the powers of Carol Danvers. Rogue absorbs Danvers' powers permanently. Mystique is defeated and turned over to the authorities by a powerless Danvers. The Brotherhood of Evil Mutants eventually escape, and battle against Dazzler. Mastermind unbalances Rogue's psyche with the one she absorbed from Ms. Marvel, which prompts her to defect to the X-Men. Mystique assumes that Professor X, the X-Men's mentor, brainwashed her. The Brotherhood of Evil Mutants launches an attempt to kill Professor X. Rogue stops Mystique, and explains that she joined the X-Men because Professor X, as the world's most powerful telepath, is her best hope of healing for her fragmented psyche; Mystique reluctantly relinquishes her guardianship of Rogue.

=== Freedom Force ===
Anti-mutant sentiment rises and the federal government launches its own covert anti-mutant program, Project Wideawake. Believing that the times have become too dangerous for the Brotherhood of Evil Mutants to continue, Mystique goes to Valerie Cooper, special assistant to the head of the National Security Council, and offers the Brotherhood's services to the government. In return for entering government service, Mystique and her team receive a presidential pardon for all criminal charges, to be revoked if any member of Freedom Force is found committing a crime. Cooper agrees to convey the offer to the President on the condition that the Brotherhood arrests their founder, Magneto. The Brotherhood, reconfigured as Freedom Force, are defeated by Magneto and the X-Men. When Magneto learns that Freedom Force are official federal agents, he voluntarily surrenders to them.

Mystique leads Freedom Force against the Reavers on Muir Island. On this particularly disastrous mission, Freedom Force members Stonewall and Destiny are killed. The death of her lover leaves Mystique psychologically scarred, and she deserts her former allies.

=== X-Factor ===
Mystique resurfaces several months later, in a failed attempt to kill Legion for his role in the murder of Destiny. Mystique has an implant put in her skull by Forge for the government to be able to keep track of her and is forcibly reassigned to the government-sponsored team X-Factor after being arrested for trying to blow up a dam. In truth, Mystique had been trying to save the dam, which the government wanted to destroy in a false flag attack blamed on mutants. Her membership leads to tension with her teammates when Sabretooth is added to the team months later as a sleeper agent, for the main purpose of killing Mystique before she can uncover the truth about the conspiracy. She slowly develops a romantic relationship with Forge (though he later thought that she was just using him).

Part of the conspiracy involves Mystique's son Graydon Creed running for President, under an anti-mutant platform. Following Graydon's death, Sabretooth acts on his orders to kill the members of X-Factor as "Operation: Zero Tolerance" is activated. Mystique distracts Sabretooth long enough to keep him from finishing off the team. She again chooses to abandon her teammates, though unlike before, she makes sure that they receive medical treatment for their injuries first.

Mystique goes into hiding and assumes the identity of Mallory Brickman, wife of an influential senator. Through her husband, she sets the FBI to take down Sabretooth. She also prevents Rogue from giving up her mutant powers and continues her investigation of the U.S. government over her son's death, leading to her aiding Toad and his most recent incarnation of the Brotherhood of Mutants on a mission to raid a government base. The mission fails thanks to Machine Man, who fights the Brotherhood and forces the team to flee. Mystique goes to Europe and takes the form of a blond-haired woman. A famous photographer, unaware of her true identity, scouts her to be a fashion model.

Eager to finally have a normal life, Mystique accepts his offer and quickly becomes rich and successful, enabling her to move into an expensive penthouse apartment in New York. There, Skrulls staying in a nearby building frame Mystique for the murder of a Japanese diplomat. With help from Shadowcat and Rogue, Mystique is cleared and leaves town. Before she leaves, Shadowcat finds one of Destiny's diaries, left there by Destiny herself before her death.

=== Breakdown ===
While gaining critical intelligence on the identity of those who were involved in her son's death and the attempt to kill her using Sabretooth, Mystique suddenly loses her powers while pretending to be a man in a busy office workplace.

Mystique is arrested. The U.S. government acts on their intelligence regarding Mystique, and destroys all of the alternate identities that she established over the years and confiscate the money she and Destiny had hidden away. The loss of her powers and her freedom causes her to lash out at everyone around her. Rogue has no sympathy for Mystique's plight. The relationship sours when Rogue refuses to tell Mystique that the X-Men are going to fight the High Evolutionary, who was responsible for depowering all mutants, to restore everyone's powers. The X-Men defeat the High Evolutionary and restore everyone's powers, allowing Mystique to escape jail.

Mystique is sent back in time by the original X-Factor's sentient ship. Raven finds that she is destined to be part of a time paradox, where she finds herself with a time delay weapon, which she is about to program to kill Graydon. After some deliberation, she decides to activate the weapon to kill Graydon. Mystique's sanity is further damaged by the revelation that Destiny was one of the founding members of the anti-mutant conspiracy Mystique had dedicated countless years to fighting, and had willfully withheld medical treatment to mutant children that would have resulted in them not growing up deformed due to their mutations.

This leads to Raven again going mad. She reforms the Brotherhood of Evil Mutants for another assassination attempt on Senator Kelly, and kidnaps Moira MacTaggert to impersonate her and gain access to research on the Legacy Virus. Mystique reverse engineers the Virus, creating a biological weapon targeting the human genome as well as an antidote.

The assassination attempt on Kelly ends in failure when Pyro betrays his teammates. Mystique blows up MacTaggert's research facility, fatally injuring MacTaggert. Mystique then shoots MacTaggert's foster daughter Wolfsbane with a prototype of Forge's neutralizer gun, removing her powers. The X-Men confront Mystique and she is seriously wounded. She tells the X-Men that Destiny had predicted a dark future for mutant-kind, and that the future Destiny foretold kept on unfolding despite all that Mystique had done to prevent it. She believes that the only way to save them is to eradicate all humans.

Mystique is sent to prison but quickly escapes. She allies with Martinique Jason in an attempt to wrest control of the X-Corps from its founder, Banshee. Outfitted with a device that gives her the ability to generate an electrical charge, Mystique poses as a reformed mutant criminal named Surge and joins the X-Corps. While Jason mind-controls the other members of the organization, Mystique brings Banshee's organization down and slits his throat, leaving him in critical condition.

=== Double agent ===
Professor X is forced to make Mystique his secret agent, as his previous one, Prudence Leighton, has died and Mystique is the only one suitable to complete the missions. Xavier poses as Magneto to rescue Mystique from the Department of Homeland Security and from execution at the hands of Johny Kitano, Special Magistrate for Homo Superior crimes against humanity, and a mutant himself. At this time, Mystique claims that there is an imposter out to frame her, taking control over the Brotherhood and sending them on their recent missions. As long as Mystique completes the missions without killing anybody, Xavier, working with Forge, keeps her safe from the authorities, who are out to execute her.

One of Xavier's enemies, the Quiet Man, who is actually Prudence Leighton inhabiting the body of her assassin, contacts Mystique through her brother Francis Leighton (Shepard) and offers to give her an interference transmitter which would keep her safe from the authorities if she kills Xavier. Creating a plan that would free her from both men, Mystique pretends to try killing Xavier while secretly working with the mutant thief Fantomex, after alerting Forge to stop her at the last moment. Her plan is to have the Quiet Man see this and believe that she really has attempted to kill Xavier and is still working for him. The other X-Men believe that Mystique has tried killing Xavier and seek her out.

Rogue tracks her down. Distraught with rage, she attacks her foster mother. Mystique escapes by blowing up the house and going through the window, changing her form to shield her fall.

Mystique goes to the Quiet Man, who is planning on having her killed. After a battle, Mystique kills the Quiet Man, saves her former field-handler Shortpack, and discovers the Quiet Man's interference transmitter was a fake. She tries to steal Forge's interference transmitter but is caught. After some angry words, he smashes it and tells her he never wants to see her again. The two share a sad goodbye kiss and Mystique leaves. After Mystique is gone, Forge realizes that she had already switched his transmitter for the fake one.

=== Joining the X-Men ===
Mystique later infiltrates the X-Men, posing as a young girl named Foxx and joining Gambit's training squad, the Chevaliers. She attempts to seduce Rogue's boyfriend Gambit to break them up so she can set her daughter up with a young mutant named Augustus, but Gambit resists. Mystique ultimately reveals herself to him, telling him that she is trying to relieve the tension between him and Rogue (because of the two being unable to touch due to her ability to absorb someone's essence upon skin-to-skin contact). Mystique transforms into Rogue and tells Gambit that he would not be cheating on Rogue if he had sex with her in Rogue's form.

When the telepath Emma Frost discovers who Foxx really is, the X-Men confront Mystique. Mystique tells them that she had been lonely and wants to join the X-Men. Mystique uses Rogue's doubts about what happened between her and Gambit to sow further discord in Rogue's relationship with Gambit, but he still refuses. The X-Men vote and decide to have Mystique join them on a probationary status (though Rogue is one of the ones who vote against her joining). Nightcrawler asks her to leave for a while regardless of the vote, saying that he needs more time adjusting to the idea of her being a member. Mystique agrees and leaves. After M-Day, she joins the X-Men and brings Augustus (Pulse) along with her. Both have been crucial in the downfall of Apocalypse.

=== Marauders ===
After the Hecatomb battle on Providence, Rogue's team returns to Rogue's childhood home in Caldecott County, Mississippi, which Mystique owns, for some downtime. Mystique alerts the X-Men, who come to treat Rogue's illness, that there are intruders in the area. Only after Lady Mastermind drops her illusions do the X-Men realize that it is an all-out attack, and that both Lady Mastermind and Omega Sentinel (the latter being possessed by Malice) have defected sides. During the Marauders' initial ambush, Mystique prevents Scalphunter from shooting Rogue. She then reveals herself as a traitor as well, shoots her adopted daughter, and orders the remaining Marauders to kill the X-Men.

Mystique remains with the Marauders during the hunt for the first new mutant baby, but is revealed to have murdered Mister Sinister in a plot involving the baby and Rogue's killing touch. She also appears to be working with Gambit, who, like her, has ulterior motives to want to betray Sinister. When Sinister approaches Mystique as she is with the comatose Rogue, Mystique shoves Sinister onto Rogue, killing him through fatal skin-to-skin contact. Then, in keeping with the words of the Destiny Diaries, she touches the baby's face to Rogue's. The baby's touch purges her of the Strain 88 virus and all the residual psyches she had absorbed over her life, including Hecatomb. Rogue is sickened by Mystique's manipulations, and leaves.

Wolverine tracks Mystique to the Middle East and then into Afghanistan. It is hinted at that Mystique's recent betrayal is not the only reason Logan is out to kill her, as they have a common history of friendship, love, and ultimately, betrayal. After a heated fight, Wolverine wounds Mystique, but denies her the Coup de grâce.

=== Manifest Destiny ===
Mystique shows up again, posing as Bobby Drake's ex-girlfriend Opal Tanaka. She sets off a bomb inside of Bobby's Blackbird before shooting him and kicking him out of the plane. Later, she follows Iceman to the hospital and injects him with a fatal dose of a toxin created by Mister Sinister. Hospital staff try to get to Iceman, but they are held back by Mystique while Iceman expels the toxin from his system. Afterward, Mystique attacks Iceman in a truck and sets the truck ablaze with Iceman in it. Iceman steps out of the fire unharmed and disarms and immobilizes Mystique, but she escapes after turning her body into her child form. Mystique impersonates Iceman and stands on top of the Golden Gate bridge threatening to blow it up. Iceman arrives and discovers the reason for Mystique doing this is Wolverine telling her that she will die alone. After a heated conversation, Iceman freezes the bomb. Mystique jumps off the bridge into the water. Iceman tells Cyclops and Hank McCoy that he knows that she is not dead and thanks her for what she did for him.

=== Dark X-Men ===
Mystique joins Norman Osborn's Dark X-Men, posing as Professor Charles Xavier for P.R. purposes. Osborn has her injected with nanites and kept on a short leash; should she try anything, Osborn would turn her into a human bomb. After Emma Frost, Namor, and Cloak and Dagger defect from the team, Mystique leads the remaining members under the public guise of Jean Grey, as no one could prove Jean had actually died, but mainly to hurt those who had caused her great harm.

Wolverine, having returned from hell and retrieved his possessed body from a demonic force, targets Mystique after finding out she was responsible for sending his soul there at the behest of The Red Right Hand. Mystique is shot by a hit-man named Lord Deathstrike, who is the brother of Lady Deathstrike. Badly wounded, Mystique patches herself and escapes on a motorcycle. Wolverine and Lord Deathstrike are in hot pursuit of Mystique throughout the San Francisco streets simultaneously. Mystique ultimately confronts Wolverine, who stabs her with his claws, killing her.

=== Revival ===
Mystique is seen alive again posing as Sabretooth at Los Angeles International Airport. In the form of Sabretooth, she agrees to assist the Hellfire Club in their destruction of the Jean Grey School. Mystique, as Sabretooth, is a faculty member of the Hellfire Academy. When the Hand revived Mystique, her powers were enhanced and she is now capable of changing her scent to match the forms she takes.

Receiving word that the original X-Men are in the present day, Mystique seeks out young Scott Summers to manipulate him into thinking she has his and mutantkind's best interests at heart. Mystique intends to buy Madripoor from Hydra and control the crime in the area. Before this transaction is completed, the X-Men raid the place. Lady Mastermind and Mystique are captured, but Mystique escapes in a S.H.I.E.L.D. helicopter. Mystique drugs and replaces Dazzler, who is now S.H.I.E.L.D.'s mutant liaison, allowing her to set up operations in Madripoor.

=== Uncanny Avengers ===
Mystique appears as a member of Magneto's unnamed supervillain group during the fight against Red Skull. When the heroes and villains present undergo a moral inversion due to a flawed spell cast by the Scarlet Witch and Doctor Doom, Mystique joins the other inverted villains in the 'Astonishing Avengers' as they go up against the inverted X-Men and Avengers, also working to prevent the inverted Nightcrawler from killing those who were involved in the riot that nearly killed him before his first meeting with Professor X. During the final fight, Mystique briefly poses as Professor X to try to get through to the 'reborn' Apocalypse (actually the now-adult clone of Apocalypse known as Evan Sabahnur that the X-Men had been trying to raise away from his template's influence), but is converted back to her usual villainous attitude at the conclusion of the storyline.

=== Krakoan Era ===
Mystique is sent in with a team of X-Men to stop the launch by the anti-mutant organization Orchis to activate Mother Mold, an incredibly powerful Master Mold made to make other Master Molds that will lead to the Nimrod generation. While they succeed, the whole team is killed in the raid, to then be resurrected on Krakoa.

Mystique is sent on a last-ditch mission to detonate a singularity bomb inside the Orchis base before Orchis leader Alia Gregor completes her own Nimrod prototype, in exchange for moving the resurrection of Destiny to the front. The mission ends in failure, with only the Nimrod containing Alia's husband's mind being destroyed. A back-up Nimrod is nevertheless still functioning. This leads to Magneto and Professor X forbidding Destiny's resurrection—it is heavily implied they had no intention of ever doing this due to her being a threat to Moira McTaggert—and Mystique remembering a promise Destiny made to burn down Krakoa if such an event occurred. Mystique and a resurrected Destiny go on to join the Quiet Council of Krakoa, Krakoa's ruling body.

== Powers and abilities ==
Mystique is a mutant shapeshifter with the ability to molecularly shift the formation of her biological cells at will to change her appearance and thereby assume the form of other humans and animals. She can also alter her voice to duplicate exactly that of another person. It was recently expanded upon that Mystique achieves shapeshifting by an ability to "rewrite every disgusting trace of sapiens code if she has to" and does not merely shift skin. Mystique has an instinctive command over cells, hormones and ribosomes, which qualifies her as a gene-shaper.

Originally, it was clearly stated that Mystique's powers were limited to appearances only; she could not assume the powers of the people she morphed into or alter her body to adapt to different situations. Additionally, she could not change her overall body mass when taking on the appearance of a person larger or smaller, but due to subsequent enhancements she has stated that her body mass is not fixed and can change when she does. It is unclear if some of the unknowns about her abilities were because she is secretive, or because memory tampering affected her understanding of some of them; especially because she admittedly does not claim to know the science behind them all.

Her body is not limited to purely organic appearances: She also has the ability to create the appearance of clothes and other materials out of her own body, including items such as glasses, zippers, identity cards, handbags and even test tubes. Mystique is shown in at least one instance transforming a metallic part of her costume into a functioning blaster pistol.

Mystique's ability to alter her own genes means that her cells are constantly being recreated, thus preventing cellular degeneration. As such, she does not visibly age and is still in her physical prime despite having lived for at least a century or possibly longer.

Mystique received her first power enhancement in the X-Men Forever miniseries, in which she was exposed to dangerous levels of radiation to save the life of Toad. The process boosted her powers so that she can now morph her body into taking certain desired physical traits depending on her situation at the time. Examples of these new abilities include night vision, wings on her back, talons in her fingers or toes, and natural body armor. She can compress into nearly two-dimensions (like a sheet of paper) to glide on air currents in a fashion similar to that of Mister Fantastic. She has moved her vital organs out of place to survive gunshots to her torso and head, and can make herself virtually invisible via camouflage. She has even, with strain, given herself two heads and four arms to facilitate a gun fight on two fronts, as well as shapeshifted into herself as a small child. She is also now able to hold a shape when knocked unconscious and can conceal items in shapeshifted pouches under her skin.

Following her death and resurrection by the Hand, her powers have been further enhanced. She can now alter and conceal her scent from those with enhanced senses, and is capable of changing her shape to a greater degree, including altering her limbs to form tentacles and bladed weapons, and compressing herself into a dog.

Damage to her biological tissue is known to heal at a relatively fast rate and she can form a resistance to poisons upon contacting them. Her enhancements have allowed her to rapidly regrow severed limbs, and rapidly recover from near fatal injury. Her powers grant her immunity to diseases, enhanced agility and considerable higher physical strength and resilience.

Without her super powers, Mystique is an experienced strategist in terrorist and commando operations, as well as a trained martial artist. She is adept at finding, stealing, understanding advanced weaponry, and is an expert in information technology. She is self-taught in several scientific disciplines. She is a skilled actress and a polyglot, who speaks more than fourteen languages. Others are unable to read her thoughts because of her constantly changing grey matter and the use of devices to prevent telepathic intrusion. After impersonating other humans for more than a century, she can identify impostors from observing their body language and changes in behavior.

Through the creation of multiple identities, Mystique has amassed considerable personal resources; one of her aliases is the billionaire "B. Byron Biggs", who owns a number of safehouses around the world with advanced security systems. She also controls a variety of weaponry and gadgets, including the Changeling, a stealth ship capable of cloaking and high-speed flying. The ship has weapons and surveillance systems, with an on-board analysis computer and power-suppressing containment cells.

== Reception ==
=== Critical reception ===
Shoshana Kessock of Tor.com called Mystique "one of the most impactful mutant villains in the comics," writing, "With several independent movies suggested for the ongoing X-Men franchise, we'll just have to wait and see if our favorite blue shapeshifter appears beside Gambit and Magneto as a possibility. Fox would really be losing out if they overlooked their opportunity for a kick-ass, sexy, heartfelt and powerful action movie with Mystique." Peter Eckhardt of CBR.com stated, "The shape-shifting Mystique is one of the X-Men's most compelling characters. Mystique is primarily motivated by self-interest and is capable enough to get what she wants, be it through espionage, combat, or manipulation. One of the most dynamic figures in the Marvel Universe, Mystique has remained a central player since her introduction." Richard Chachiwski of Screen Rant wrote, "One of the most recognizable villains in all of X-Men comics, Mystique is a blue-skinned, red-haired mutant shapeshifter able to take any physical form she wishes. A frequent adversary to the X-Men, she has also been portrayed as an unlikely anti-heroine in later years. The founding member of her own Brotherhood of Mutants, Mystique is characterized not only by her memorable physical appearance, but also by the various personal relationships she maintains with several X-Men team members." IGN asserted, "Not every great villain has to be a world-conquering, war-mongering, super-powered bad ass. Some of them are simply great at manipulating events to their liking, bending the world to their desire and getting away with it. Mystique is one of those villains, and is absolutely one of the greatest female villains ever created. [...] In essence, over the years X-fans have been treated to a kick ass femme fatale who has found herself at several key turning points in the history of the mutant race. Princess Weekes of The Mary Sue said, "One of my biggest issues with the X-Men film franchise is how they have underserved their actresses/female characters. Despite Mystique being known for her pragmatism, spy-craft, intelligence, queerness, and complex family history, all of that, in adaptation, gets chiseled down to spy-craft and that's it. The character has a lot more to offer audiences, and considering we, as comic fans, have been denied the entire majesty of Mystique, and how amazing Romijn was in delivering the very basic bones and elevating it to a masterclass, with writers who care, she could be the amazing antagonist we deserve." Evan Valentine of ComicBook.com stated, "Marvel's Mystique is about to play a major role in Marvel's comics with the upcoming comic book event, Inferno, acting as one of the biggest story arcs of Jonathan Hickman's X-Men run. While no one knows when the Marvel Cinematic Universe will introduce the blue-skinned villain to its roster, she was definitely a fan-favorite mutant within Fox's X-Men titles."

Sara Century of Collider expressed interest in seeing Mystique in the X-Men '97 series.

==== Sexuality ====
Benjamin Riley of Special Broadcasting Service referred to Mystique as one of the "queer superheroes who changed the face of comics," writing, "You could argue that shapeshifting, femme-fatale Mystique's bisexuality makes her another negative example of the 'bisexual villain' trope in popular culture, but given she's one of comics' most interesting superhero characters I think she pulls it off. Brutally intelligent and morally opaque, Raven Darkholme has a prominent X-Men villain, and occasional ally, for decades. Her co-creator Chris Claremont has said Mystique was always meant to have been in a romantic, same-sex relationship with her long-time partner Destiny, but Marvel Comics' then-edict on same-sex romance meant this had to be revealed in hindsight, years after Destiny's character had been killed off." Matthew Kang of MovieWeb described Mystique an "allegory for the LGBTQ+ experience," saying, "Some mutants choose to hide that they are a mutant. Others publicly embrace that aspect of themselves. While the Marvel universe is not the most welcoming towards mutants, Raven Darkholme (Mystique) chooses to accept herself and declares that she is "mutant and proud." In the real world, allies and members of the LGBTQ+ community wave the rainbow flag. June is Pride Month, a time when people celebrate the freedom to be themselves." Samantha Puc of Newsarama called Mystique and Destiny's relationship one of the "most iconic LGBTQIA+ comics romances," writing, "Though it remains to be seen whether it's a good thing or a bad thing, longtime villains-turned-Krakoan politicians Mystique and Destiny are mutantkind's current power couple, following Destiny's resurrection and their upending of the Quiet Council's status quo in the recent Inferno limited series. And they've certainly earned their place as mutant matriarchs." Sara Century of Syfy said, "Mystique has been a hypersexualized seducer of men in many of her comic book appearances since Destiny's death, and while that isn't inherently a bad thing, it has a tendency to distract writers and readers away from other interesting aspects of her character. Her stories have distanced her from the discussion of her queerness and her potential status as a non-binary character so much as to render it non-existent. Mystique has seldom been given the deeper focus she deserves, even after years of stories in which she appeared as a prominent character. Her relationship with Destiny is still referred to in the context of close friendship in most stories." Mark Young of BuzzFeed wrote, "The shapeshifting mutant not only has a strong history of being with any and all people, she also defies gender on a daily basis. Her onscreen portrayals have been very straight and as a sort of lackey/underling figure, but her comic history shows the queer woman has very much been her own amazing figure." Beat Staff of ComicsBeat stated, "Mystique and Destiny have been written as lovers from the beginning. From their first appearances, the love and loyalty they felt for each other was so palpable that it has to date inspired fanfiction and critical commentary that takes their status as one of comics' most epic love stories as text. Wherever their story might go, Mystique and Destiny have always had the kind of love that transcends the thoughts, desires, and expectations of the outside world." Jude Dry of IndieWire asserted, "While she's only been depicted in her many movie appearances as being interested in men such as Charles Xavier or Magneto, Mystique has been canonically bisexual since 1981. The character has been romantically connected to her companion Destiny ever since their first appearance in X-Men together. The characters are shown dancing together, and the ancient power known as the Shadow King refers to Destiny as Mystique's "leman", an archaic term for "lover". The antiquated word was likely a ruse to slip past the comic [censors] of the time. Mystique is one of the most famous and beloved X-Men, and making her bisexual would certainly be a boon for the MCU."

=== Accolades ===
- In 2009, IGN ranked Mystique 18th in their "Greatest Comic Book Villain of All Time" list and included her in their "Marvel's Femme Fatales" list.
- In 2014, BuzzFeed ranked Mystique 20th in their "95 X-Men Members Ranked From Worst To Best" list.
- In 2015, Entertainment Weekly ranked Mystique 14th in their "Let's rank every X-Man ever" list.
- In 2019, Screen Rant ranked Mystique 9th in their "10 Strongest Female Marvel Villains" list.
- In 2019, CBR.com ranked Mystique 9th in their "X-Men: The 10 Most Powerful Female Villains" list.
- In 2020, Scary Mommy included Mystique in their "195+ Marvel Female Characters Are Truly Heroic" list.
- In 2021, BuzzFeed ranked Mystique 9th in their "11 Of The Most Important Marvel And DC LGBTQ+ Superheroes" list.
- In 2022, Screen Rant ranked Mystique 3rd in their "10 Best X-Men Characters Created By Chris Claremont" list.
- In 2022, CBR.com ranked Mystique 3rd in their "Marvel's 10 Best Infiltrators" list, 4th in their "10 Most Heroic Marvel Villains" list, and ranked Mystique and Destiny's 5th in their "Marvel's 10 Best Married Couples" list.
- In 2022, The A.V. Club ranked Mystique 11th in their "28 best Marvel villain" list and 62nd in their "100 best Marvel characters" list.
- In 2022, Newsarama ranked Mystique 10th in their "Best X-Men villains" list.

== Literary reception ==
=== Volumes ===
==== Mystique - 2003 ====
According to Diamond Comic Distributors, Mystique #1 was the 25th best selling comic book in April 2003.

==== X-Men: Black - Mystique - 2018 ====
According to Diamond Comic Distributors, X-Men: Black - Mystique #1 was the 42nd best selling comic book in October 2018. X-Men: Black - Mystique #1 was the 400th best selling comic book in 2018.

Mike Fugere of CBR.com described X-Men: Black - Mystique #1 as a "great villain spotlight", writing, "Other than that one quibble, from a narrative standpoint the issue is fun and gives a strong voice to Raven. Her inner monologue reads like a character screed written for new readers, telling you everything you need to know about Mystique while still keeping everyone at arm's length, which plays to the character's strengths brilliantly. If Mystique were to get her own miniseries, or even an ongoing series, we would love to see McGuire take the reins. She has a wonderful understanding of the character, and conveys this fact in a single issue. The artwork is solid as well. Marco Failla (Ms. Marvel) is a talent to watch. His panel layout and story beat transitions are smooth and easy to follow (which makes those pesky character tags even more frustrating), and his line work is crisp and reminds us of the works of Oscar Bazaldua. And while the coloring in this issue isn't exactly next level, Jesus Aburtov brings enough to the table to keep things aesthetically pleasing. Next to the Mojo issue, this is the best offering from X-Men: Black so far. It's fast-paced and leaves you wanting more of Mystique, and reminds us that Raven is more than just Jennifer Lawrence in blue makeup. Mystique is a powerhouse of a character, one who, when in the right hands, can drive noir and espionage narratives with ease. Just like the previous entries in X-Men: Black this is one to add to your stack if you have even the slightest interest in the character." Peyton Hinckle of ComicsVerse gave X-Men: Black - Mystique #1 a score of 91%, saying, "In X-Men: Black - Mystique #1, McGuire finally gives Mystique some definitive titles that go beyond "villain" or "X-Man". We see her not just as a thief but as someone who truly feels as though stealing and committing crimes is a form of art. Her ease and calm demeanor show us a master at work. Her willingness to release the young captured mutant shows what may be the beginning of morals. Of course, the senseless slaughter of an entire office building full of people shows us the exact opposite. Mystique doesn't learn some grand lesson or show true emotion, like in Magneto and Mojo's X-MEN BLACK issues. But, someone who's been around for as long as Mystique has doesn't need those things. She just needs the things that make her who she is. [...] X-Men: Black - Mystique #1 is the kind of issue that is undoubtedly a good read but definitely could have said more. A few hints about Mystique's future could have gone a long way and would've given readers something to look forward to. Still, I thoroughly enjoyed learning more about Mystique's personal motives and identity. If you're not a fan of Mystique, this issue probably isn't for you, since it's absolutely focused on her character. If you are a fan, or perhaps used to be a fan, this one is definitely worth a buy."

== Other versions ==
=== Age of Apocalypse ===
An alternate universe version of Mystique appears in "Age of Apocalypse" timeline. This version is a guardian of the refuge Avalon who charges a heavy tariff to ferry refugees to Avalon, taking all of their valuables. Overcome with guilt, Mystique eventually works with her son Nightcrawler to oppose Apocalypse.

=== Battle of the Atom ===
A possible future version of Mystique appears in All-New X-Men #27. This version is the mother of Raze, who was conceived with Wolverine and possesses the combined abilities of his parents. Raze later kills Mystique and takes her appearance, becoming the ruler of Madripoor.

=== Earth-14412 ===
An alternate universe version of Mystique from Earth-14412 appears in Avengers (vol. 8). This version wields the Phoenix Force and operates as the Dark Phoenix. She is a member of the Multiversal Masters of Evil and is in charge of the Berserkers consisting of Hound (a version of Wolverine from an alternate reality) and an unidentified version of Thor. Dark Phoenix in the form of a phoenix attacks Echo and Firehair to claim the ancient Multiverse energies for herself, only to be killed by them.

=== House of M ===
An alternate universe version of Mystique appears in "House of M". This version is an agent of S.H.I.E.L.D. and a member of its elite unit, the Red Guard. Mystique is also romantically involved with Wolverine, the Red Guard's leader.

=== Infinity Wars ===
Deathstrique, a composite character based on Mystique and Lady Deathstrike, appears in the Infinity Wars storyline.

=== Ultimate Marvel ===
An alternate universe version of Mystique appears in the Ultimate Marvel imprint. This version is the former lover of Charles Xavier. During their stay in the Savage Land with Magneto, the young Emma Frost comes under the tutelage of Xavier, and shortly thereafter he dumps Mystique for Frost. Ever since then, Mystique has held great resentment toward Xavier, which in turn makes her loyal to Magneto.

=== Ultimate Universe ===
An alternate universe version of Mystique from Earth-6160 appears in the "Ultimate Universe" imprint. This version is a member of a resistance against the Rasputin family called the Opposition.

=== X-Men: The End ===
In the trilogy book series X-Men: The End, Mystique is posing as Dark Beast and pretending to work with Mister Sinister. When Sinister murders Rogue she kills him. Gambit later asks her to look after his and Rogue's children when he goes off into space.

== In other media ==
=== Television ===
- Mystique appears in X-Men: The Animated Series, voiced by Randall Carpenter in the first and second seasons and by Jennifer Dale for the rest of the series. This version serves as an enforcer and henchwoman for Apocalypse, Mister Sinister, and Magneto, as well as leading the Brotherhood of Evil Mutants.
  - Mystique appears in X-Men '97, voiced again by Randall Carpenter.
- Mystique appears in X-Men: Evolution, primarily voiced by Colleen Wheeler. This version initially serves Magneto as his second in command, supervises the Brotherhood of Bayville, and works undercover as Principal Raven Darkholme of Bayville High School during the first season until Magneto betrays her. For the second through fourth seasons, she goes rogue and assumes the alias of Risty Wilde (voiced by Nicole Oliver) before she is converted into Apocalypse's Horseman of Pestilence in the two-part series finale "Ascension".
- Mystique appears in Wolverine and the X-Men, voiced by Tamara Bernier. This version is a resident of Genosha and member of Magneto's Acolytes who displays previous romantic history with Wolverine.
- Mystique appears in The Super Hero Squad Show episode "Deadly is the Black Widow's Bite!", voiced by Lena Headey. This version is a member of Doctor Doom's Lethal Legion.
- Mystique appears in Marvel Disk Wars: The Avengers, voiced by Masumi Asano.

=== Film ===
Two incarnations of Mystique appear in Twentieth Century Fox's X-Men film series, portrayed by Rebecca Romijn and Jennifer Lawrence as adults and Morgan Lily as a child. The first incarnation appears in X-Men (2000), X2, and X-Men: The Last Stand portrayed by Romijn as a member of Magneto's Brotherhood of Mutants until she is subjected to a mutant cure and ousted from the group, for which she later sells him out. The second incarnation appears in X-Men: First Class, X-Men: Days of Future Past, X-Men: Apocalypse, and Dark Phoenix, portrayed by Lawrence as the childhood friend of Charles Xavier, founding member of the X-Men, and associate of Magneto before she is eventually and inadvertently killed by Jean Grey while trying to save her from the Phoenix Force.

Romijn will reprise the role in the Marvel Cinematic Universe film Avengers: Doomsday (2026).

=== Video games ===
- Mystique appears as a boss in X-Men (1992).
- Mystique appears as a playable character in X-Men: Mutant Academy. This version is a member of Magneto's Brotherhood of Mutants.
- Mystique appears as a playable character in X-Men: Mutant Academy 2. This version is a member of Magneto's Brotherhood of Mutants.
- Mystique appears as a playable character in X-Men: Next Dimension, voiced by Julianne Grossman. This version is a member of Magneto's Brotherhood of Mutants.
- Mystique appears as a boss in X-Men Legends, voiced by Grey DeLisle. This version is a member of Magneto's Brotherhood of Mutants.
- Mystique appears as a non-player character (NPC) in X-Men Legends II: Rise of Apocalypse, voiced again by Grey DeLisle. This version is a member of Magneto's Brotherhood of Mutants.
- Mystique appears in X-Men Origins: Wolverine, voiced by Anna Graves. This version is a former CIA liaison for Team X and is in a relationship with John Wraith.
- Mystique appears in the Nintendo DS version of Marvel Super Hero Squad.
- Mystique appears in Marvel Super Hero Squad Online.
- Mystique appears in X-Men: Destiny, voiced by Sumalee Montano. This version is a member of Magneto's Brotherhood of Mutants.
- Mystique appears in LittleBigPlanet via the "Marvel Costume Kit 1" DLC.
- Mystique appears in Marvel: Avengers Alliance as a member of Magneto's Brotherhood of Mutants.
- Mystique appears as a playable character in Lego Marvel Super Heroes, voiced by Laura Bailey. This version is a member of Magneto's Brotherhood of Mutants.
- Mystique appears as a playable character in Marvel Strike Force. This version is a member of Magneto's Brotherhood of Mutants and the Marauders.
- Mystique appears as an NPC in Marvel Ultimate Alliance 3: The Black Order, voiced again by Sumalee Montano. This version is a member of Magneto's Brotherhood of Mutants.
- Mystique appears as a playable character in Fortnite Battle Royale.
- Mystique appears in Marvel Snap.
- Mystique appears in Marvel's Wolverine, voiced and motion-captured by Nicole Pacent. This version is a member of Team X and was married to Tyger Tiger until the latter left her due to Mystique's complicity in Nathaniel Essex's schemes.

== Bibliography ==
- Brownfield, Troy (2025). X-Men For Dummies. Marvel. ISBN 978-1-394-36274-5.
- Deman, J. Andrew (2023). The Claremont Run: Subverting Gender in the X-Men. University of Texas Press. ISBN 978-1-4773-3075-3.
- Sanderson, Peter (2006). X-Men: The Ultimate Guide. DK. ISBN 9780756620059.
- Wiacek, Stephen "Win" (2026). X-Men: The Ultimate Guide. DK. ISBN 979-8-2173-0613-8.
