= Freedom Force (comics) =

Group of fictional characters

Freedom Force is the name of two fictional teams appearing in American comic books published by Marvel Comics.

== Publication history ==
The original version first appeared in Uncanny X-Men #199 (November 1985) and was created by Chris Claremont and John Romita Jr. Freedom Force was a supervillain team, though they occasionally acted in a heroic capacity as well. It was a government-sponsored team composed mainly of Mystique's version of the Brotherhood of Mutants. They mostly interacted with the X-Men, X-Factor, and New Mutants, but also repeatedly met the Avengers.

The second team first appeared in Avengers: The Initiative #12 (June 2007) and were created by Dan Slott, Christos Gage, and Steve Uy. It was set up as Montana's Fifty State Initiative superteam.

== Fictional team biography ==
=== Mystique's Freedom Force ===
Freedom Force

Publication information
- Publisher: Marvel Comics
- First appearance: Uncanny X-Men #199 (November 1985)
- Created by: Chris Claremont (writer); John Romita, Jr. (artist)

In-story information
- Base(s): Various
- Member(s): Avalanche; Blob; Valerie Cooper (government liaison); Crimson Commando; Destiny; Mystique (leader); Pyro; Spider-Woman; Spiral; Stonewall; Super Sabre

When mutant and human relationships worsen, Mystique decides that it has become too dangerous for the Brotherhood of Evil Mutants to continue their current path. She offers the group's services to Valerie Cooper, a United States National Security Advisor, in exchange for full pardons. Cooper sees a great opportunity in Mystique's offer, but wants the team to prove their loyalty first by arresting the original group's founder Magneto. The team accepts, and is renamed "Freedom Force" with Spiral added to the team. The group attacks Magneto at a remembrance ceremony for the Holocaust. Though they meet a decisive defeat at the hands of the X-Men, Magneto surrenders to Freedom Force.

On their next mission, Spider-Woman is added to the team's line-up. When the Avengers are framed by their embittered former member Quicksilver, the U.S. government sends Freedom Force to arrest the Avengers, which they do successfully. Disillusioned and disgusted by her team's actions, as well as her own in helping them, Spider-Woman infiltrates the prison where the Avengers are being held, and helps free them. She then leaves Freedom Force permanently. Another three members are added: Crimson Commando, Stonewall, and Super Sabre, all World War II veterans who decided to take justice in their own hands and kill criminals. When they targeted Storm, they were defeated and turned themselves in. It was thought that the former heroes could be redeemed and they were offered a position on Freedom Force.

Over the next few months, they are given many unpopular tasks, such as enforcing the Mutant Registration Act, arresting the outlaw X-Men, and saving the people of Dallas from an attack by an evil god. Freedom Force clashes with X-Factor and the New Mutants when they learn that Freedom Force is helping the U.S. government forcibly recruit young mutants and potential mutants for training and eventual government service. Freedom Force also assists in apprehending the mutant terrorists Resistants.

Freedom Force also participates in other missions of a more general nature, including the rescue of Senator Robert Kelly from a South American drug syndicate that had kidnapped during a diplomatic visit, as well as helping to contain a jailbreak at the Vault in the story Avengers: Deathtrap, the Vault.

Forge asks Freedom Force to protect Muir Island against the Reavers, during which Stonewall and Destiny are killed. The team disbands soon afterward and is replaced by the government team X-Factor, also under Valerie Cooper's supervision.

=== Initiative Freedom Force ===
Freedom Force

Publication information
- Publisher: Marvel Comics
- First appearance: Avengers: The Initiative #12 (June 2007)
- Created by: Dan Slott; Christos N. Gage; Steve Uy

In-story information
- Base(s): Montana
- Member(s): Challenger (leader); Cloud 9 Equinox; Spinner; Think Tank

After the superhuman "Civil War", registered superheroes were teamed up and assigned to a state, with Freedom Force being Montana's registered team in the Fifty State Initiative. This Freedom Force team consists of Cloud 9, Think Tank, Equinox and Spinner, and is led by Challenger.

During the Secret Invasion storyline, Equinox is revealed to be a Skrull infiltrator and is killed by Cloud 9. Spinner dies soon after while trying to destroy a Skrull weapon system.

During the Dark Reign storyline, Norman Osborn orders Freedom Force to attack the Heavy Hitters after they secede from the Initiative. He feels he can trust the team to follow orders due both to Equinox's criminal past and to Challenger coming from a time when authority is to be respected and obeyed without question. They help the other Initiative teams to defeat and capture the Heavy Hitters' leader, Prodigy.

During the Fear Itself storyline, the Freedom Force members appear at a meeting held by Prodigy regarding magical hammers that have crashed into the Earth. Among them is also Spinner, who is inexplicably shown alive.

== Members ==
=== Mystique's Freedom Force members ===
- Mystique - Leader.
- Avalanche
- Blob
- Valerie Cooper - Freedom Force's government liaison.
- Crimson Commando
- Destiny
- Pyro
- Spider-Woman
- Spiral
- Stonewall
- Super Sabre

=== Initiative Freedom Force members ===
- Challenger - Leader.
- Cloud 9 - A superhero who can manipulate a cloud-like gas form.
- Equinox - A Skrull infiltrator who possesses Equinox's powers. Killed by Cloud 9.
- Spinner - A superheroine whose powers rotate every 24 hours. Some of her known powers have included invulnerability, super-strength, super-speed, and flight.
- Think Tank - A superhero with telekinesis. His brain is housed in a liquid-filled globe that replaces his head.

== Freedom Force trademark ==
Marvel Comics abandoned the Freedom Force trademark in the 1990s. It was eventually re-registered by computer game developer Irrational Games, which used it as the name of an unrelated team.

== Other versions ==
An undead version of Freedom Force appears in the Marvel Zombies universe, consisting of Mystique, Pyro, and Avalanche.
