= Longshot (Marvel Comics) =

Marvel Comics superhero

- Cover of Exiles #74 by Paul Pelletier

Publication information
- Publisher: Marvel Comics
- First appearance: Longshot #1 (September 1985)
- Created by: Ann Nocenti (writer); Art Adams (artist)

In-story information
- Alter ego: No dual identity
- Species: Artificial Mojoverse lifeform
- Team affiliations: X-Factor Investigations; New Excalibur; Exiles; X-Men; Wildways Rebellion
- Abilities: Limited probability manipulation; Psychometry; Expert hand-to-hand combatant; Proficient in the use of bladed weaponry; Proficient in the use of firearms

Longshot is a superhero appearing in American comic books published by Marvel Comics, most commonly in association with the X-Men. Created by writer Ann Nocenti and artist Art Adams, he first appeared in Longshot #1 (September 1985), the first issue of a six-issue miniseries that represents the first major work of both Nocenti and Adams. The Longshot series established Longshot as an amnesiac fugitive from another dimension who discovers that he has a "good luck" power that protects him from harm when his motives are pure. He also discovers that he was a slave who led a rebellion on his dystopian world against his former master and enemy, Mojo.

The character subsequently becomes a recurring fixture in the various X-Men related books, which see him as a member of the X-Men from 1986 to 1989, a member of Tony Bedard and Chris Claremont's Exiles teams, and a member of the third incarnation of X-Factor from 2008–2013, as well as in his own solo adventures. Later stories establish he is a paradoxical genetically engineered clone of his future son, Shatterstar. Versions of the character have also appeared in the Ultimate Marvel line of books, and television and video games.

== Publication history ==
=== 1980s ===
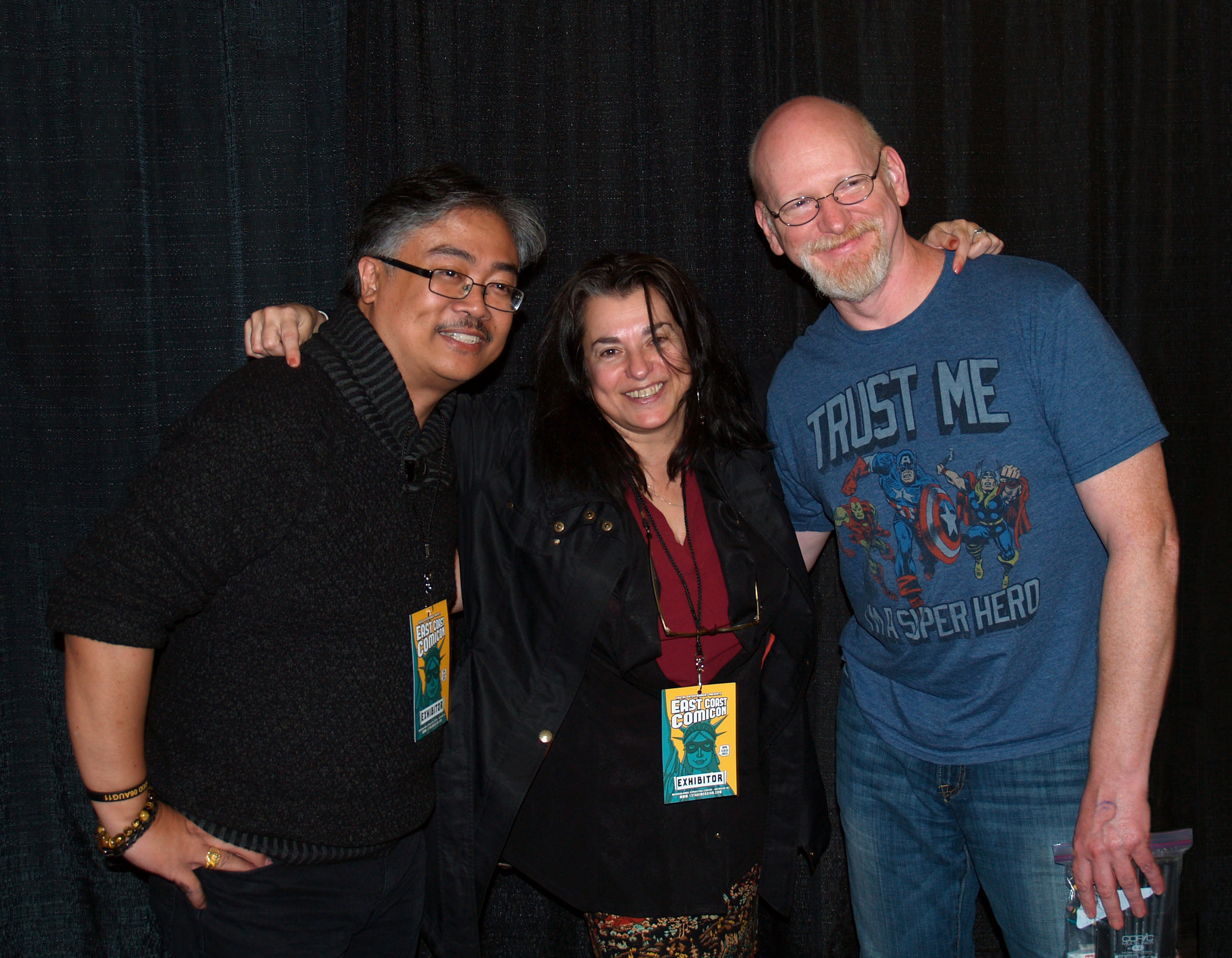
Whilce Portacio, Ann Nocenti and Arthur Adams at the 2015 East Coast Comicon, during the 30th anniversary year of their collaboration on Longshot. This was the first time they had appeared in public together since publication of that miniseries.

Left: Initial design for Longshot commissioned by editor Carl Potts. At right, artist Art Adams' concept designs for the character. Note the hand and spine studies, as per writer Ann Nocenti's instructions (from the X-Men: Longshot hardcover collection).

Ann Nocenti wrote the story for the Longshot limited series (1985-1986). After most of Marvel's artists declined to take on the project, it was offered to aspiring artist Arthur Adams, whose samples had been given to editor Carl Potts and Nocenti, his assistant editor, by editor Al Milgrom.

Explaining the concept of the character, which Nocenti borrowed from existentialist writers, she states, "Longshot is the idea of stripping someone of everything that they are. I never read comics, so the idea of a hero to me was different. I couldn't think of it in terms of a 'super hero' hero. I thought of it more as a conceptual hero. Not having a comic book background, I tend to come up with the metaphysics before I come up with the characters. I knew that I wanted to deal with the metaphysics of luck. It was a concept that interested me...what luck is, what probability is, how you could shift probabilities towards yourself. What are the repercussions of that? So, I did a character centered around that idea." Nocenti describes Longshot's state at the beginning of the miniseries by referring to him as "a clean slate. He has no memories, no past, no name, no nothing...In a sense, what I was trying to do was strip someone down to where he had none of the crutches that we normally have. Memory, in a way, is a crutch, or your name, or what you believe you are. So, Longshot's odyssey begins with some very basic questions: Who is he? Why is he here? Ultimately, he goes on a quest for his past and finds it in search of him."

A design for the character of Longshot was put forward by Carl Potts, who outfitted the character in a jumpsuit that Adams thought to be reminiscent of the Starfleet uniforms from Star Trek: The Motion Picture. Nocenti suggested that Longshot look distinct from other superheroes. She prescribed that he be an alien, have only four fingers on each hand, and has an unusual spine, though this last trait was not mentioned in the comics. Adams created his own design, and wanting to distinguish the character visually, based his mullet haircut on that of musician Limahl, as no other major Marvel character had such a haircut. Adams, who disliked the practice of having characters produce weapons and other devices from their boots or secret pockets that had never before been established, decided to include some pouches on the character's belt, a practice that influenced the artwork of the founders of Image Comics. Nocenti came up with the idea of having Longshot's left eye glow when he uses his power for noble causes: "I was living in a loft on 26th and Sixth and we had a one-eyed cat. I'd go out at night and I'd see this one eye [glowing in the dark]."

Longshot debuted in a six-issue, eponymous 1985–1986 mini-series. The series established the "Mojoverse", an alien dimension whose residents are addicted to televised gladiator-like entertainment and ruled by the tyrannical network head Mojo. Longshot possesses probability-altering or "luck" powers, and is an action star who escapes enslavement by Mojo. With no memory of who he is, he embarks on a series of adventures with the people he encounters, among them Ricochet Rita, who Adams modeled after Nocenti. A Longshot ongoing series with Nocenti and Adams as the creative team was announced in 1988. According to Nocenti, "every issue is going to throw him into a completely different universe. So one issue, he's going to enter the world of the dead, and one issue he's going to go into a future world where he meets ageing heroes..." However, the series never materialized. Mephisto was to be the central villain; shortly after the series was cancelled, Nocenti began using Mephisto as a major villain in Daredevil.

After the miniseries, Longshot joined the X-Men in Uncanny X-Men Annual #10 in 1986, and remained with them until Uncanny X-Men #248 (September 1989).

=== 1990s and after ===
Longshot appears in a story arc beginning in X-Men #10 (July 1992) by Jim Lee. He subsequently made occasional appearances in various Marvel books, such as Exiles, the 1997 one-shot Fools, and X-Factor (vol. 3), a book whose cast he joined in issue #35 (November 2008). He remained a part of that cast until that book's cancellation in 2013.

In November 2013, Marvel premiered Longshot Saves the Marvel Universe, a four-issue miniseries written by Christopher Hastings and illustrated by Jacopo Camagni.

== Fictional character biography ==
=== Origins ===
Longshot is an artificially created humanoid life-form, with the ability to defy probability. He is from an alternate dimension known as "Mojoworld" or the "Mojoverse". He is one of many slaves created by genetic engineers in the employ of Mojoworld's masters, the grossly obese, virtually immobile Spineless Ones, who are ruled by the media-obsessed delusional maniac Mojo. The head geneticist, Arize, gave Longshot and his other creations (such as the ram-headed Quark) free will and a conscience, hoping that one day they would rise up against their masters. Longshot and many of his fellow slaves rebel against the slave-masters. They undergo a mystical ritual that gives them the power to create good luck for themselves. Despite this power, their masters win the war due to their superior weaponry and the limits of the slaves' luck. Longshot is rendered amnesiac by the Spineless Ones, but he manages to flee from Mojoworld to Earth. A number of Mojo's servants, led by the hound-like Gog and Magog, pursue him, but are stuck between Longshot's world and Earth. Unable to remember his real name, Longshot becomes an adventurer, taking his name after several humans call him Longshot due to his incredible good luck. While recovering, Longshot befriends the human stunt-woman named Ricochet Rita and works as a movie stuntman himself. He also adopts the docile Magog, who he renames "Pup". Finally, Mojo and his assistant Spiral follow Longshot to Earth. Longshot battles Spiral and defeats Mojo with the aid of Ricochet Rita, Quark, and Doctor Strange, who then send Mojo and his minions back to the Mojoverse. Longshot, Quark, and Rita return to the Mojoverse to free the other slaves.

=== Member of the X-Men ===
After an unsuccessful rebellion, a once-again amnesiac Longshot is sent back to Earth by Mojo, where he joins the X-Men. With the X-Men, he battles the Juggernaut and the Marauders. Longshot dies with the rest of the X-Men while defeating the Adversary, but is resurrected by Roma soon afterward. Longshot and the X-Men fight the Reavers in Australia for the first time. He battles the Brood. With the X-Men, he rescues his captured teammates from the island nation of Genosha, which uses mutants as a slave caste. He soon becomes Dazzler's lover. However, he suffers a severe identity crisis, and eventually leaves the X-Men.

Before long, Longshot is reunited with Dazzler, and is teleported with her to Mojoworld. For a short time, they live in Mojoworld, until they are captured by Mojo. They, with the X-Men and Mojo's temporary successor, "Mojo II: The Sequel", lead a revolt against Mojo. Longshot and Dazzler also learn that Dazzler is pregnant with their child, who was hinted to be Shatterstar, the member of X-Force. The pair also care for the X-Babies, a group of Mojo-manufactured child clones of the X-Men. One of the many X-Babies created is a young version of Longshot. Dazzler's pregnancy was initially suggested to have resulted in a miscarriage. The outcome of Dazzler's pregnancy was resolved many years later in the storyline "The End of X-Factor". Dazzler returned to Earth separately from Longshot suffering from memory loss, believing that Longshot, the X-Babies, and everyone in the rebellion had been killed by Mojo and his followers.

=== Longshot: Fools ===
After being "killed" by the Thingy and denied entrance into Heaven, Longshot realizes he has lost his innocence, the main source of his luck power. Ejected from Heaven and the Mojoverse, Longshot is stranded between Baum and Barrie, Kansas, pursued by the vengeful Thingy. When a child who has befriended the broken hero is damaged by the monster, Longshot, helped by a group of mental patients, rediscovers his faith in himself and his own purity despite the suffering of his wife to restore her to health. In the end, the unlikely group sets out for the big city, searching for adventure, secure in their luck and their innocence.

=== Exiles ===
Again suffering from memory loss, Longshot is recruited for the Exiles by Heather Hudson to help against Proteus. Mojo claims that he and all the other inhabitants of Mojoworld are "unique" in that there is no parallel counterpart to his realm. This would extend to Longshot, though his status as a unique entity does not affect his membership in the Exiles. Morph reveals that Longshot's abilities cancel Proteus' reality warping powers, making him a perfect candidate for the team. He is brought aboard to replace the dead Mimic. Longshot saves Blink from Proteus in 2099, and saves Blink, Morph, Sabretooth, Star Brand, Lenore Fenzl, and Nightmask from Proteus in the New Universe Approximation. When the Exiles visit the future, Longshot tries to stop Maestro's rampage and stop Proteus from taking over Maestro's body. The Exiles finally corner Proteus at the Heroes Reborn world, and trap Proteus in Morph's body. With the hunt for Proteus at an end, Longshot remains an Exile to continue fixing damaged realities. During their last mission, Longshot is seemingly brainwashed into attacking Blink by Madame Hydra and the Hand. Afterwards, Longshot leaves the Exiles during a mission on Earth-616 where he is re-introduced to Dazzler, whom he has no memory of their time together in Mojoworld.

=== X-Factor ===
After failing to rekindle his relationship with Dazzler due to the loss of his memories, Longshot shows up in Detroit after reading an article about his supposed appearance there during the events of "Secret Invasion", thanks to a Skrull impostor. After a small fight with Strong Guy, he helps X-Factor find out what happened to Darwin and his father, leading them to the Karma Project. During that time, he is seen commenting that women are too friendly towards him, and reveals that his memory losses are so severe that he no longer understands his powers.

In X-Factor #47, it is once more hinted that Longshot and Shatterstar are related. It is not until a one-shot issue during the final X-Factor story arc, "The End of X-Factor", that their connection is explained. After Rictor and Shatterstar are transported into Mojoworld's past, they and the audience learn that Shatterstar is the only Mojoworld rebel who was not created by Arize the Creator, as he in fact mysteriously appeared from the sky one day. Arize used Shatterstar's genetic material to create Longshot, making Shatterstar the father of Longshot genetically. Mojo later attacks Arize's sanctuary, so Shatterstar time-teleports himself and Rictor to a time in Mojoworld's history when Dazzler and Longshot are married and fighting a war against Mojo. Dazzler, pregnant with Longshot's child, goes into labor, and gives birth to a young Shatterstar, who Shatterstar explains to Rictor he will deliver to the future of Mojoworld to be raised by the people that raised him, but not before he erases Dazzler and Longshot's memories of their having a child.

== Powers and abilities ==
Longshot was created through genetic engineering by Arize. Longshot has hollow bones and each of his hands has three fingers with an opposable thumb. His skin is like leather, and he has two hearts. He is acrobatic at a superhuman level (including his speed, agility, dexterity, flexibility, reflexes/reactions, coordination, and balance), being able to evade blows by Spider-Man. He also has advanced healing abilities. In Longshot #3, these abilities automatically healed him following several hits with high-powered laser beams and falling out of the sky and impacting a barn when his jetpack malfunctioned.

Ann Nocenti, who co-created Longshot, says of his primary superhuman trait, "Longshot has access to probabilities and luck. He's lucky, he's miraculous in a way...he was born with this talent to have access to being lucky, and the problem is that he finds out that there's a flip side to luck. There are repercussions. If you pull probabilities towards yourself, you're probably taking them away from other people, so it's actually something that he shouldn't even be doing." His genetic engineering was augmented using magic to give him superhuman abilities including the ability to alter probability fields using psionic means to bolster his activities with "good luck", meaning extremely unlikely events happen in his favor. This power operates even without Longshot consciously willing it, and is tied into the positive aspects of his personality: should he attempt to use his powers for a selfish or evil act, or should lose hope, his powers will fail to function or even backfire, giving him bad luck. Echoing Nocenti's words on the adverse side effects of his powers, Longshot's luck is fickle by nature, and can backfire when he overuses it, causing an equal and opposite effect of "bad luck" which can affect himself or others.

Longshot is able to read "psychic imprints" when people leave them on objects they handle, allowing him to read the thoughts that individual experienced while in contact with the object, which is a phenomenon called psychometry. He is also able to read a person's future in this manner. Longshot is also able to telepathically "read" recent memories of people through physical contact with them. Nocenti elaborates on the psychometry thus: "If you picked up a hammer and used it to bang nails every day and Longshot went to read it, he may not read much of it, but if it was used to kill somebody, that would leave a bigger psychic imprint, even if somebody held an object and cried over it, he would feel that too. If someone's emotional or intense enough around an object, they'll imprint it stronger, so he can read that."

A recurring aspect of stories he appeared in was the strong, spontaneous attraction that women exhibited to him, a trait with which he was genetically engineered.

=== Equipment ===
Longshot carries several small, cleaver-like blades that he stores in a bandolier, which he can throw with superhuman accuracy or just using his luck powers in some cases. He is highly skilled in using other types of weaponry that are bladed. During his X-Men years, Longshot also carried a folding grappling hook and rope either carried looped around one shoulder or stored in his shoulder bag, and a set of throwing spikes which produced net-like wires between them to restrain a target.

Longshot is proficient in the use of jetpacks for flight, the use of handheld directed-energy weapons, and hang gliders.

== Reception ==
In 2014, Darren Franich of Entertainment Weekly ranked Longshot 31st in his "Let's rank every X-Man ever" list. Franich praised the concept of Longshot, comparing the Mojoverse to Running Man and Mad Max; however, he believed that Longshot became less interesting as a character after joining the X-Men.

== Other versions ==
Several alternate universe versions of Longshot have appeared throughout the character's publication history.

- In the 1992 storyline "Shattershot", an older version of Longshot observes the former slaves and the Spineless Ones finally making peace, though his identity is not revealed until the story's end.
- In the Ultimate Marvel universe, Longshot is a mutant named Arthur Centino and a resident of Genosha. His surname, Centino, is an anagram of Ann Nocenti's surname. During the Ultimatum storyline, it is revealed that Longshot was killed under orders from Magneto.
- In a possible future depicted in "Age of Revelation", Longshot refuses to star in Mojo's new show unless he receives a pay increase, with Mojo eventually agreeing to his terms and giving him the increase.

== In other media ==
=== Television ===
Longshot appears in X-Men: The Animated Series, voiced by Rod Wilson.

=== Video games ===
- Longshot appears as a playable character in Marvel: Contest of Champions.
- Longshot appears as a playable character in Marvel Strike Force.

== Collected editions ==
Title	Material collected	Published date	ISBN
X-Men: Longshot	Longshot #1-6	November 2008	978-0785130918
Longshot Saves the Marvel Universe	Longshot Saves The Marvel Universe #1-4	June 2014	978-0785190127
