= Nocturne (Talia Wagner) =

Fictional character appearing in Marvel Comics

- Nocturne, as seen in New Excalibur. Art by Michael Ryan.

Publication information
- Publisher: Marvel Comics
- First appearance: (background and basic look) X-Men: Millennial Visions (August 2000) (in-comic) Blink #4 (June 2001)
- Created by: Jim Calafiore

In-story information
- Alter ego: Talia Josephine "T.J." Wagner
- Species: Human Mutant
- Team affiliations: Exiles; New Excalibur; Brotherhood of Mutants; X-Men
- Abilities: Body possession; Ability to project "Hex Bolts"; Prehensile tail; Superhuman agility; Latent telepathy

Nocturne (Talia Josephine "T.J." Wagner) is a fictional character appearing in American comic books published by Marvel Comics. The character is depicted as a member of the reality-hopping Exiles and formerly associated with New Excalibur. Talia is the daughter of Nightcrawler and Scarlet Witch and originates from an alternate universe. She possesses Nightcrawler's demonic appearance and increased agility, as well as several unique abilities, including telepathy and possession.

== Fictional character biography ==
Nocturne is from an alternative reality outside the main Marvel Universe (Earth-616). She is the daughter of that reality's Nightcrawler and the Scarlet Witch. She is based on Jim Calafiore's "Professor W's X-Men" entry of the X-Men Millennial Visions 2000 one-shot.

=== Life in the X-Men ===
T.J. grew up around the X-Men and under her father's care, while her mother remains a member of the Avengers. Wolverine attacks Charles Xavier while under the control of the Shadow King. The Shadow King is expelled from Wolverine's mind, but Xavier is fatally wounded in the attack and Logan is left crippled. Jean Grey dies shortly after the attack, and Cyclops blames Wolverine for both deaths and abandons the team. As a result, Wolverine and Nightcrawler take over as leaders of the X-Men and the Xavier Institute. Nocturne becomes an active member of the X-Men when she is seventeen years old, and has faced several of the team's most dangerous foes, including Apocalypse and a vengeance-seeking Cyclops. Nocturne saves Wolverine's life during Cyclops's attack by possessing her unconscious teammate Armageddon and using his telekinetic powers to move Wolverine's paralyzed arms and impale Cyclops.

=== Exiles ===
At twenty years old, Nocturne is taken by the Timebroker and told that she has become "unhinged from time." The Timebroker tells Nocturne that if she does not work to right the wrongs that have occurred in a multitude of alternate universes, her own timeline would remain altered and Nightcrawler would be murdered by his mother, Mystique. Nocturne becomes a member of the reality-hopping Exiles.

Over the course of the Exiles' first adventures, Nocturne develops a romantic relationship with teammate John Proudstar/Thunderbird, who is the former horseman, War, for his reality's Apocalypse. By the time the team is trapped for a month on a Skrull-dominated alternate Earth, Nocturne is pregnant with Thunderbird's child. However, John is wounded during his efforts to repel Galactus during that mission, and is left behind when the team moves to the next reality. Nocturne later suffers a miscarriage; it is unclear whether the miscarriage is natural or if she terminated the pregnancy herself.

Textless cover of Exiles #1 (August 2001). Art by Mike McKone.

Nocturne and the Exiles travel to the main universe (Earth-616), where they meet the X-Men after Havok's cancelled wedding. The Exiles team up with the X-Men against an evil Havok from the Mutant X universe, who shares a body with the good Havok. After Havok is subdued, the Timebroker arrives to personally eliminate the Mutant X Havok. During this mission, Nocturne meets the main universe Nightcrawler, whom she accidentally calls "Dad" at first. The two develop a close bond.

After a few more missions, the Exiles are given a new teammate, Namora, and a new mission from the Tallus: "Leave your possessions and earn your wings". Mister Fantastic eventually deciphers the mission's meaning: Beak of the X-Men joins the Exiles and Nocturne stays behind in the main Marvel Universe.

=== Brotherhood/Return from Mojoworld ===
Nocturne infiltrates Exodus' new Brotherhood, but is sucked into Xorn's head along with several other members of the Brotherhood. She ends up in Mojoworld with Juggernaut and is enslaved by Mojo. To escape, Nocturne takes control of Mojo's servant Spiral and opens a portal to the X-Men's Danger Room. However, Spiral regains control of her body and leaves a portal open to allow Mojo to cross over as well. Mojo turns the X-Men into X-Babies and sends his "Exile Legal Eagles" after them, but they manage to overpower his forces. The group is re-aged, and Nocturne remains with the X-Men for the time being.

=== House of M ===
During the House of M storyline, Nocturne is sought by Callisto's Marauders for having royal Magnus blood, but is protected by Psylocke and Marvel Girl. Marvel Girl allows Nocturne to possess her to keep her out of the Marauders' reach. Psylocke pursues, eventually culminating in a telekinetic blade battle, which Psylocke wins. This allows Marvel Girl's own consciousness to resurface. The three of them fight off the Marauders together and later help Captain Britain and Meggan prevent reality from being destroyed.

=== New Excalibur ===
Nocturne next appears in New Excalibur, alongside Juggernaut, Sage, Dazzler, Captain Britain, and Pete Wisdom. During her time with New Excalibur, Nocturne developed the ability to possess people without knocking them unconscious.

She also suffered a stroke while on the team. She suffered aftereffects, such as hemiparesis, partial memory loss, and aphasia, but recovers over time. Nocturne later reunites with the Exiles, including her lover Thunderbird who is no longer comatose. Nocturne takes charge of the current team of Exiles while Blink is off to recruit another group of superheroes.

== Powers and abilities ==
Nocturne inherited abilities from both her parents, namely Nightcrawler's night vision, camouflage, and agility. She does not possess any of Scarlet Witch's abilities, instead having the ability to generate otherdimensional energy blasts, possess the bodies of others, and read their minds.

== Reception ==
- In 2014, Entertainment Weekly ranked Nocturne 46th in their "Let's rank every X-Man ever" list.
- In 2018, Comic Book Resources (CBR) ranked Nocturne 9th in their "8 X-Men Kids Cooler Than Their Parents (And 7 Who Are Way Worse)" list.

== Other versions ==
- An alternate universe variant of Nocturne appears in X-Men: The End.
- Prior to Nocturne's introduction, a similar character named Blue appeared in Days of Future Present as part of a future incarnation of the New Mutants.

== Collected editions ==
- Exiles
  - Exiles Volume 1: Down the Rabbit Hole (TPB, May 2002, ISBN 0-7851-0833-5)
  - Exiles Volume 2: A World Apart (TPB, October 2002, ISBN 0-7851-1021-6)
  - Exiles Volume 3: Out of Time (TPB, February 2003, ISBN 0-7851-1085-2)
  - Exiles Volume 4: Legacy (TPB, August 2003, ISBN 0-7851-1109-3)
  - Exiles Volume 5: Unnatural Instinct (TPB, November 2003, ISBN 0-7851-1110-7)
  - Exiles Volume 6: Fantastic Voyage (TPB, March 2004, ISBN 0-7851-1197-2)
  - Exiles Volume 7: A Blink in Time (TPB, June 2004, ISBN 0-7851-1235-9)
  - Exiles Volume 8: Earn Your Wings (TPB, November 2004, ISBN 0-7851-1459-9)
- X-Men
  - House of M: Uncanny X-Men (TPB, collects Uncanny X-Men #462–465, February 2006, ISBN 0-7851-1663-X)
  - X-Men: The End Book One: Dreamers and Demons (TPB, March 2005, ISBN 0-7851-1690-7)
  - X-Men: The End Book Two: Heroes and Martyrs (TPB, November 2005, ISBN 0-7851-1691-5)
  - X-Men: The End Book Three: Men and X-Men (TPB, September 2006, ISBN 0-7851-1692-3)
- New Excalibur #1–24 (November 2005 – 2007):
  - New Excalibur Volume 1: Defenders of the Realm (TPB, collects #1–7, August 2006, ISBN 0-7851-1835-7)
  - New Excalibur Volume 2: Last Day of Camelot (TPB, collects #8–15, March 2007, ISBN 0-7851-2221-4)
  - New Excalibur Volume 3: Battle of the Britains (TPB, collects #16–24, December 2007, ISBN 0-7851-2455-1)
