= Mutant X (comics) =

Marvel comic book by Howard Mackie

The Six (Mutant X)
- The Six, clockwise from back: Fallen, Brute, Marvel Woman, Havok, Bloodstorm, and Ice-Man

Publication information
- Publisher: Marvel Comics
- No. of issues: 32, 3 Annuals
- Main character(s): Havok; Scotty Summers; Marvel Woman/Goblyn Queen; Elektra; Bloodstorm

Creative team
- Created by: Howard Mackie; Tom Raney; Andrew Pepoy

Mutant X is a comic book published by Marvel Comics between 1998 and 2001, featuring Havok, a mutant and former member of the X-Men who is transported into a parallel dimension. It was written by Howard Mackie and inked by Andrew Pepoy, with a series of different pencilers.

The "Mutant X" universe (Earth-1298) is a reimagination of the Earth-616 universe. In this continuum, Scott Summers was captured along with his parents by the Shi'ar and only Alex (Havok) escaped, allowing him to be the eventual leader of the X-Men. Originally, the highlighted difference between the Mutant X universe and Earth-616 was that mutants have come to be accepted by the overwhelming majority of humanity, and anti-mutant sentiments are regarded as outdated. Eventually, the hatred against mutants reignites even stronger than in Earth-616 due to the actions of the Goblin Queen.

== Publication history ==
Mutant X was originally intended to be a 12-issue limited series, but due to unexpectedly high sales it was extended to an ongoing series. The series lasted for 32 issues and three annuals before it ended.

== Plot ==
After Greystone, a member of Havok's X-Factor team, develops temporal insanity, he attempts to build a time machine to return to his timeline and be reunited with his mother who, in all probability, does not exist anymore. Havok attempts to stop him, but the machine explodes, supposedly killing both men. At the instant of Havok's death, a Havok from an alternate reality also dies after being shot in the chest by a Sentinel. Havok's spirit finds its way into his counterpart's body and he wakes up in the Mutant X Universe. Here, he is the leader of a mutant team of heroes dubbed The Six (who are altered versions of his friends from Earth-616), the husband of Madelyne Pryor, and the father of Scotty Summers.

At first he tries to convince the others of the Six to help him return to his universe. They all still believe him to be the Havok of their universe and insist that he is lying about coming from another dimension as a way of getting back at Madelyne for some unspecified injury. Havok ultimately gives up and decides to take on his counterpart's place in this universe. Scotty, who has precognitive powers, realizes that Havok is telling the truth, and addresses him as "Alex" instead of "Dad". The two quickly form a bond.

A demon-possessed Madelyne sets plans to take over the world. She takes control of all members of the Six except Havok. Scotty is warned of her doings by his precognitive power, and Havok takes him and his nanny, Elektra, into hiding. For months Madelyne wages war against the rest of the world while trying to open a gateway to allow a full demonic invasion. Scotty finally stops her by exorcising the Goblin Entity from her mind.

The destruction caused by Madelyne serves as a spark to ignite the seething anti-mutant sentiment in the United States, and new president Graydon Creed tasks terrorist leader Nick Fury with rounding up mutants into prison camps; though the public explanation is that this is for their protection, mutants taken into the camps are immediately killed. Havok has Elektra take Scotty into hiding, while the remaining members of the Six, supplemented by new members Gambit and Captain America, set about rescuing mutants from Nick Fury's troops.

At the end of the series, the Goblin Entity, Dracula, and the Beyonder converge their efforts to destroy Earth. Almost all of the heroes die in the epic battle. Havok, discovering that he is the home for the Nexus of Realities, a force of nature that binds all realities (Omniverse), uses it to wield an omniversal level of power to stop the Goblin Entity, which had merged with the Beyonder. He then fights with the possessed Madelyne and harnesses the power of the Nexus of All Realities and with a thought eliminates the Goblin Entity throughout the Omniverse. He then teleports Madelyne to her alternate universe with her son, Scotty. Fearing that somebody would attempt to use the power of the Nexus of All Realities to reshape, destroy, or alter the Omniverse; he then becomes one with the Nexus of All Realities to prevent anyone from getting this power, except himself.

== Revisitation ==
The Mutant X Havok did not die during the fight with the Sentinels. He was instead thrown into unconsciousness while the Earth-616 Havok took over his body. The evil Havok went with the original Havok back to Earth-616 during the final battle with the Goblin Queen. He lay dormant when Charles Xavier freed Alex's consciousness, biding his time, and re-emerged after Wolf Cub wounded Havok. The Exiles (Mimic, Magik, Heather Hudson, Nocturne, Morph and Sunfire) were sent by the Timebroker to fight off the evil Alex until the Earth-616 version came back. The Timebroker then personally eliminated the evil Alex's consciousness.

== Characters ==
- Alex Summers/Havok: Transplanted from Earth-616 to the Mutant X universe, Alex finds himself thrust into the role of his other-dimensional counterpart. His sole confident in the Mutant X universe is his counterpart's son, Scotty, and he dedicates himself to protecting him.
- Scotty Summers: The son of Havok and Marvel Woman. He has immensely powerful sensory and precognitive abilities, and is the only person to realize that Alex is not lying when he says he is from an alternate universe. Despite knowing this, he instinctively trusts Alex and even comes to regard him as a surrogate father. His powers are such that he singlehandedly puts an end to the Goblin Queen's conquest of Earth.
- Elektra: A highly trained ninja, Elektra Stavros serves as a nanny for Scotty.
- Dracula: Dracula's coffin is held in a special cell in the Vault until it is broken out by the Marauders. He proceeds to go on a killing rampage before being killed by Storm.
- Magneto: Magneto became friends with Professor X and they formed the X-Men. Following Professor X becoming possessed by the Shadow King, Magneto became the leader of the X-Men.
- Nick Fury: Leader of S.H.I.E.L.D. (Saviors of Humanity by Intervention in the Evolution of Life-form Deviants), an outlaw terrorist group dedicated to exterminating all superpowered humans. S.H.I.E.L.D. is reinstated by President Graydon Creed to hunt down mutants.

=== The Six ===
At the beginning of the series, Havok is the leader of The Six, a superhero group which is roughly equivalent to the Earth-616 original X-Men. The roster includes:

Character	Real Name	Joined in	Notes
Bloodstorm	Ororo Munroe	Founding member	In a branch from Uncanny X-Men #159, Storm was not saved from the bite of Dracula and was transformed into a vampire. Aside from her control over the weather, she has standard vampire powers such as the ability to transform into mist and control vermin. As she still retains her oath not to kill (in the Earth-616 continuity she broke that oath in Uncanny X-Men #170), Bloodstorm employs Forge and Kitty Pryde as food sources, draining from them enough to sustain herself but not to kill them.
Brute	Henry "Hank" McCoy	Founding member	As a result of experimenting on himself, Hank McCoy was transformed into an amphibious creature with the intellect of a small child. He also made a faulty deal with demons, which resulted in his legs being replaced with goat hooves.
The Fallen	Warren Worthington III	Founding member	Apocalypse transformed Warren into one of his four horseman, Death, giving him bat wings, pale skin, and the ability to breathe fire. Since betraying Apocalypse, he has insisted on being called The Fallen. To his chagrin, however, his friends all still call him Warren.
Havok	Alex Summers	Founding member	Since his older brother Cyclops disappeared from Earth when they were children, Havok essentially took on the Earth-616 Cyclops's roles as leader of his universe's premiere mutant team and husband of Madelyne Pryor. He trades places with the Earth-616 Havok in Mutant X #1, and so is absent from most of the series.
Ice-Man	Bob Drake	Founding member	Left without a device to suppress his powers after the tampering of Loki, Bob Drake was left trapped in his ice form without the ability to touch another living thing. Despite this, he remains incurably optimistic, with a relentless sense of humor. He sees himself as partially responsible for the Brute's mental regression and tries his best to look out for his friend.
Marvel Woman/Goblin Queen	Madelyne Pryor-Summers	Founding member	The clone of the deceased Jean Grey, Madelyne married Havok and had a son with him, Scotty. Madelyne made a deal with the demons of Inferno to unlock her telekinetic potential so as to save her son. She became corrupted as a result, and later tries to take over the world for demonkind.
Captain America		Mutant X #15	Captain America joins the team after S.H.I.E.L.D. launches a search-and-destroy policy on mutants. Though his motives are ostensibly altruistic, the team later discovers that he is secretly a mutant.
Gambit	Remy LeBeau	Mutant X #16	Gambit was critically wounded on a mission with Bloodstorm where he begged her to turn him into a vampire, and Bloodstorm reluctantly agreed. Gambit has the ability to charge objects with explosive kinetic energy and also has standard vampiric powers. He adopted a mysterious girl named Raven.

== Collected editions ==
Title	Material collected	Publication date	ISBN
Mutant X: The Complete Collection Vol. 1	Mutant X #1-17, Annual 1999	November 13, 2018	ISBN 1302920626
Mutant X: The Complete Collection Vol. 2	Mutant X #18-32, Annual 2000-2001	November 5, 2019	ISBN 978-1302920623
