= Exiles (Marvel Comics) =

Group of fictional characters

- Cover art to Exiles (vol. 2) #1. Art by Dave Bullock.

Publication information
- Publisher: Marvel Comics
- First appearance: Exiles #1 (August 2001)
- Created by: Judd Winick (writer); Mike McKone (artist)

In-story information
- Base(s): Panoptichron, the "crystal palace" outside space and time
- Member(s): Blink; Wolvie; Iron Lad; Valkyrie

Roster

The Exiles are a group of fictional characters appearing in American comic books published by Marvel Comics commonly associated with The X-Men. They feature in three series, Exiles, New Exiles, and Exiles vol. 2. The Exiles consists of characters from different universes, or realities, which have been removed from time and space in order to correct problems (often called "hiccups") in various alternate worlds and divergent timelines in the Marvel Multiverse.

Created by writer Judd Winick and artist Mike McKone, Exiles features a revolving team roster with new characters introduced and others replaced when they are killed or returned to their home reality. The series is notable for the number of characters who stay dead, in contrast to the frequent resurrections that occur in the main Marvel and DC continuities. It has featured familiar characters or settings from previous Marvel storylines, such as the "Age of Apocalypse" and "House of M".

The first volume of Exiles ran for 100 issues, ending after a crossover with the members of New Excalibur in X-Men: Die by the Sword and the one-shot Exiles: Days of Then and Now. In March 2008 New Exiles began with Chris Claremont and artist Tom Grummett at the helm. Writer Jeff Parker and artist Salvador Espin relaunched the series with a new #1 in April 2009, but the book was canceled after only six issues.

== Publication history ==
Exiles was created by Mike Marts, Mike Raicht, Judd Winick, and artists Mike McKone and Jim Calafiore. Exiles was created after a period of development aimed at creating a new What If? book for Marvel.

Raicht and Winick would develop the initial formula of Exiles' reality-hopping adventures. Chuck Austen came aboard as interim writer after Winick's move to DC Comics. Tony Bedard took over, writing roughly half the series, from #46-89. Chris Claremont came onboard as of issue #90 and ended the series with the crossover X-Men Die by the Sword, before restarting the series as New Exiles. New Exiles ran for 18 issues before being canceled. A few months later the series was restarted again with a second volume of Exiles, written by Jeff Parker. This relaunch only lasted 6 issues before being canceled as well. A third series was launched as part of Marvel Legacy, written by Saladin Ahmed joined by the art team of Javier Rodriguez, Alvaro Lopez, and Jordie Bellaire and Joe Caramagna.

A number of artists have penciled the series including Mike McKone, Jim Calafiore, Kev Walker, Clayton Henry, Mizuki Sakakibara, Casey Jones, Steve Scott, Paul Pelletier, and Tom Mandrake. Tom Grummett, Roberto Castro, Paco Diaz, and Tim Seeley worked on New Exiles.

== Fictional team biography ==
The Exiles team originally consisted of Blink (Clarice Ferguson, from the Age of Apocalypse), Mimic (Calvin Rankin), Magnus Lensherr (son of Magneto and Rogue), Thunderbird (John Proudstar), Nocturne (Talia Josephine "T.J." Wagner, daughter of Nightcrawler and Scarlet Witch), and Morph. The team has since gone through a multitude of line-ups, with Morph and Blink remaining the only original Exiles.

Exiles vol. 1 #1. Art by Mike McKone. This cover features the original roster.

=== First Series ===
==== Tallus ====
Initially, the Exiles are employed by the Timebroker to fix broken realities. The Tallus is a communications device, which is worn by the leader of the group in order to communicate with the Timebroker. Through it, he would assign missions to the team and inform them of any changes, etc. Blink wears the Tallus in the beginning, but it is later transferred to Sabretooth when Blink rebels against the Timebroker. Mimic also wears the Tallus for a time in Blink's absence. It is now used as a means of communication between its wearer and whoever is operating the Crystal Palace on various missions. It has a slightly different appearance for each wearer. For the first time ever, Sabretooth has used the Tallus to transport himself back to the Crystal Palace, without anyone on the other side recalling him.

==== Exiles ====
When Magnus dies, he is replaced by Sunfire (Mariko Yashida). Sasquatch (Heather Hudson) arrives when Thunderbird becomes comatose during a battle with the world-eating Galactus.

The Exiles then discover there is a second team conscripted by the Timebroker, Weapon X, whose missions typically involve killing or maiming innocents and heroes. The two teams join forces to rescue a group of children from a Sentinel prison camp. However, the teams are told the second stage of the mission is to kill one of the children – David Richards (son of Rachel Summers and Franklin Richards) – who will apparently grow up to become a powerful supervillain. Weapon X is willing to kill him, but the Exiles are not and the two teams fight until the Timebroker intervenes. Sabretooth (of the Weapon X team) agrees to stay behind and raise David Richards himself.

The Timebroker sends Blink home after a visit to a world plagued by a variant of the Legacy Virus, since the team had repaired her personal broken chain in time and Magik (Illyana Rasputin) takes her place. Mimic then replaces Blink as leader, gaining the Tallus.

The Exiles arrive in the main Marvel Universe (Earth-616) where they meet the X-Men after Havok's canceled wedding. The Exiles team up with the X-Men against an evil Havok from the Mutant X universe, who shares a body with the good Havok. After Havok is subdued, the Timebroker arrives to personally eliminate the Mutant X Havok's consciousness.

After Sunfire is killed by a Brood-infected Mimic, she is replaced by the Exiles' former teammate Blink. During the next mission, the Exiles and Weapon X are forced to battle each other until only six remain alive. Magik is killed by King Hyperion when she attempts to switch sides and betray the Exiles. King Hyperion is eventually defeated by Blink, who teleports his own heat vision into his back, paralyzing him. Gambit (of Weapon X) is allowed to deliver the killing blow against King Hyperion with a kinetically charged sword of the slain Magik which causes an explosion that kills them both, leaving five Exiles alive and their mission complete.

The Exiles visit the main Marvel Universe for a second time where they are joined by Namora, who replaces Magik, and are instructed to "leave their possessions and earn their wings". Reed Richards deduces this means they are to leave Nocturne behind (whose power involves possession) and have Beak join the Exiles, which is confirmed by the Timebroker.

==== Timebrokers ====
The team is told by The Celestials to "beware the Timebreaker [sic], he is not what he seems". After this, the Timebroker's behavior becomes increasingly strange. Heather Hudson is removed from the team without explanation and replaced with former Weapon X member Sabretooth. The Tallus orders the Exiles to kill Mimic and despite their refusal, they are allowed to move onto a new mission (normally, a mission must be completed for the Exiles to move on). Next, the Timebroker replaces Beak with Holocaust, which they are informed is a punishment for disobeying previous orders.

Eventually, the Exiles break free of the Timebroker and stage a raid on Panoptichron (also known as the "Crystal Palace"), home of the Timebroker and a location from which many parallel universes can be monitored. Here they discover that the Timebroker is an alien race of bug-like beings that found the Panoptichron and accidentally broke a series of timelines. Lacking the power to repair the timelines, they concocted this scheme of recruiting heroes from various worlds to do their work for them. Not only that, all previously "returned" heroes are actually in Panoptichron, frozen in blocks, along with the killed heroes. As a final twist, the evil King Hyperion has fully regenerated from being blown up by Gambit, broken free of his stasis and has taken over Panoptichron. The Exiles are nearly defeated with both Namora and Holocaust dying in the battle. Beak returns from stasis and saves the day by calling on two good versions of Hyperion for help. King Hyperion is subdued and exiled to his home reality, which is completely devoid of life. Only Blink, Mimic, Morph, Sabretooth, Beak, and Heather Hudson remain to pick up the pieces.

==== World Tour ====
The Exiles then return to Earth-616 to take Beak home. However, Earth-616 has been overtaken by the House of M reality. During their stay, the Exiles run afoul of the body-hopping serial killer Proteus, who steals data from the Panoptichron and escapes from Earth-616, leaving Beak depowered back home. The Exiles chase Proteus through several realities, including an alternate version of the New Universe, an alternate version of 2099, Squadron Supreme, Future Imperfect, and Heroes Reborn, before finally bringing Proteus down by trapping him in Morph's body, which does not decay like Proteus' other host bodies. During the "World Tour" of hunting down Proteus, Mimic is possessed by Proteus and dies, forcing the Exiles to pick up new members Longshot, Spider-Man 2099, and Power Princess to restore their diminished numbers.

==== Post-World Tour ====
The Exiles begin cleaning out the stasis gallery of former Exiles and Weapon X members and send them back home. Iron Man, Daredevil, and Angel are sent back to their respective realities alive, while every other Earth with a missing superhuman holds a funeral. Blink, at the suggestion of Power Princess, takes Mimic home to be buried with his X-Men instead of burying him in Panoptichron. Spider-Man, Sabretooth, and Heather Hudson all decide to visit their home realities. However, the Timebreakers ditch the Exiles when the Timebreakers believe that they are not saving realities as they should be. However, after using several squads of Wolverines to complete the next mission and failing, Logan (from Days of Future Past) and young James Howlett convince the Timebreakers that the Exiles are needed. The Exiles finally resume their reality-saving missions for the first time since they discovered Panoptichron when they save a reality where the Silver Surfer has already destroyed the Earth and is trying to destroy Galactus, who is the restorer of worlds in this reality.

Then, Heather discovers an Earth inhabited by a disturbingly close approximation of the original Exiles team, complete with their own Timebroker. After the "classic Exiles" fight "the all-new Exiles" (as Morph put it), it is later revealed that the whole thing was a scheme orchestrated by the Grandmaster, who seeks revenge on the Exiles for freeing Professor X on their first mission and ruining a bet. The Exiles, past and present, join forces with the Wrecking Crew of that Earth to defeat the Grandmaster. The current team then leaves the Earth in the hands of the approximation Exiles.

The Exiles then take three weeks to save a chain of cracked realities, injuring Blink, Morph, and Spider-Man. They also discover that Proteus is possibly immune to metal while in Morph’s body. Meanwhile, former Exile Thunderbird, is in the stasis gallery, dreaming of what might have been had he not become comatose.

==== Enter Psylocke ====
Power Princess leaves the team to return to the Squadron Supreme and Psylocke is brought on board to replace her. Blink, Longshot, and Spider-Man are brainwashed by Hydra, leaving only Sabretooth to pick up Morph and Psylocke. They are sent to kill Reed Richards. Slaymaster's arrival makes them fail as Betsy faints before killing Reed. The world is erased, with the Exiles still there, but it is magically restored by Reed Richards, and Valeria Richards' amulet restores the world's population because they were being stored in the amulet. The Exiles are still there so they can help Psylocke recover from wounds inflicted by Wolverine, and to help rebuild the planet. Meanwhile, Slaymaster kills Psylocke on another world.

After the Exiles return to Panoptichron, they find it empty, with no equipment, Timebreakers, or Heather. Blink and Morph eventually visit Heather, who thought the Exiles were dead and left Panoptichron. Heather is now pregnant and out of commission, so Psylocke stays behind to learn more about the Panoptichron while the other Exiles resume their missions. There she experiences visions which warn her of something bad to come, and an alternate version of Kitty Pryde appears from nowhere with no warning. The Exiles go to a seemingly perfect world led by Victor Von Doom but when Blink is caught by Reed Richards she begins to discover what hides behind this facade. She then recruits Longshot and Morph, who also sense something amiss with this world. They flee with that world's Reed to begin a resistance. Meanwhile, Spider-Man 2099 meets Gwen Stacy and Sabretooth has a one-night stand with this world's Invisible Woman. In reality, she was assigned to get close to him so Doom could copy the Tallus, which he does. He then sends a team of soldiers to Panoptichron. They take out Psylocke and assume Kitty Pryde is a freaked out child, though she appears to be faking that. The soldiers are attacked by Thunderbird, who is no longer comatose. Kitty Pryde (who goes by Cat), uses her phasing powers to create a diversion long enough to allow Thunderbird to free Psylocke. Together, they defeat the soldiers and send them home, just in time for them to see Doom's defeat, whose Earth is destroyed by Reed Richards as there is no way to turn the humans back to their normal emotional state.

As a result the Exiles are scattered to various dimensions, much like Union Jack had done previously. Psylocke, Thunderbird, and Cat are able to work on the equipment and retrieve Blink, Morph, and Sabretooth, and new members Mystiq and Rogue are brought along. Spider-Man 2099 finds a girlfriend and stays on the world on which he landed. Longshot, once again, got lucky and landed in the Crystal Palace after the transport went wrong.

==== Die by the Sword ====
Psylocke and Thunderbird travel to Earth-616 to visit Captain Britain and Nocturne during New Excalibur's victory party. During the party, Captain Britain is wounded by a strike force led by an armored lady called Rouge. While Betsy tries to care for her brother everybody else tries to fight, even Dazzler and Pete Wisdom, who were about to have sex, but, realizing they cannot win they teleport to the Panoptichron. There, Dazzler discovers that Longshot, while alive, does not remember her and is about to kill herself to ease her pain when Mystiq comes to talk her out of it. TJ happily reunites with her former teammates while Sage is deemed the best option to care for Brian. Meanwhile, Cat, using the scanner, realizes that Roma and Saturnyne are in trouble. The Corps then suffers a lot of losses, despite Saturnyne's intervention. While Cat checks on Brian, Blink, Morph, Sabretooth, Thunderbird, and Dazzler join the battlefield. Dazzler battles Rouge-Mort, who has badly wounded Roma, and Longshot gets concerned about her, making both himself and Sage wonder why/how, while Morph battles Mad Jim Jaspers by morphing into Fury but his plan is quickly foiled. Sage, Psylocke, and Wisdom recruit Albion to their cause, who proves to be a match for Jaspers until Jaspers turns into Fury. Merlyn then comes to his daughter to finish the job, only to be beaten by Psylocke. Cap then makes his move on Fury and with the help of Blink and Albion vanquishes him for now, leading to Merlyn's defeat. However, this victory comes with a price as Roma dies, though not before transferring her knowledge into Sage's mind. Saturnyne promises to free Albion from jail to lead the Corps while Sage and TJ switch teams with Longshot who now remembers the highlights of his past.

The events of Die by the Sword take place between Exiles #99-#100.

==== Exiles #100 ====
In Exiles #100 Blink, Nocturne, and Thunderbird decide to leave the team because they are physically and emotionally exhausted and need a break. They leave for Heather Hudson's reality so that Heather can keep track of Nocturne's progress as she continues to recover from her stroke. Sage struggles with her new knowledge gained from Roma and accidentally fights the other Exiles. Cat and Rogue explore the palace and almost die in a bungee-jumping accident, prompting Rogue to reveal flying powers.

In the one-shot Exiles: Days of Then and Now, Blink discovers an Earth they were supposed to save, but did not because they were chasing Proteus during the World Tour. Iron Man, Nighthawk, Wild Child, and Luke Cage from that reality died because they did not receive help from the Exiles. So, Blink decides to help an alternate Quentin Quire by acting as the Timebroker through Gambit's old Tallus, which is given to him by the Nighthawk from the reality where the Exiles had battled Weapon X after Quentin is able to transport himself there on his own. Then, he meets Mary Jane and Luke Cage, from the Vi-Locks reality, and an alternate Spitfire. Finally, he ends up in the Age of Apocalypse where he saves Wild Child. Blink then sends all five heroes (Luke Cage, Quentin, Nighthawk, Spitfire, and Wild Child) to replace Iron Man, Nighthawk, Wild Child, and Luke Cage from Quentin's reality.

=== New Exiles ===
All time members, from X-Men Messiah Complex: Mutant Files

The team went to Earth-6706 to recruit Gambit and found themselves in a three-way war between Namor, Storm, and the Black Panther. The team was separated with Rogue, Gambit and Namor, Mystiq in disguise with the Panther's team, and Sabretooth and Psylocke with Ororo. They eventually reunited for a final fight against the Panther and would have died if not for Psylocke and the powers of Gambit's mother, Susan Storm. Their mission was eventually revealed to them and they left the Earth despite the fact that the Panther had taken control of it. Meanwhile, Morph, Sage, and Cat are sucked into a world were Kitty shifts to another form. Sage regains her telepathic powers, as they defend a man who has fallen in love with a dragon.

After some fighting, the parents eventually surrender against true love and the dragon becomes human, while the Exiles are brought back to the Panoptichron, where Cat reveals that Gambit was listed as a member even before he was recruited. In the meantime, Hydra recruits a Wolverine-like man to her cause. Afterwards, Sage, Psylocke, Morph, Mystiq, Rogue, and Gambit help a team of X-Men on another Earth fight off the French during a French and British war. Psylocke receives some training from that world's Ogun. Cat discovers realities upon realities coming to their end and finds she can do nothing to stop it. However, she and Sabretooth face off against Empress Hydra after she locks them alone in a particular reality. Cat kills Wolverine by removing his claws and slashing him with them. The Exiles then enjoy a quick break in the Panoptichron, where Morph gives Rogue a new costume and Psylocke deals with her fear of Slaymaster.

The Exiles then visit a reality where Valeria Richards has traveled and has called them for help to save the world from the Fearsome Quintet of Gold Goblin, Magneta, the Blood Skull, Black Baron Dormammu, and Doom. They defeat the quintet, but their leader, the Maker, is about to defeat them when Proteus' persona re-emerges. However, Morph's persona merges with that of Proteus in the nick of time, stopping Proteus from killing the Exiles and saving the day. Valeria offers to assist them in fighting her mom, but Morph tells her that she would regret it and they suggest she go home. They then go to a reality where the main heroes are the human Daughters and Saurian Sons of the Dragon. There, they fight Lilandra, who has allied herself with Empress Hydra and they try to save Lilandra's sister Neramani from her. During the fight, Cat merges with Mystiq and kills Empress Hydra, thanks to an unplanned diversion by Gambit, who called her "mom". Meanwhile, Sage and Diana Fox are forced to unite to face off against Merlyn in Sage's mind. Diana eventually lets Sage take her over and Sage merges with the Crystal Palace, stopping the multiverse from destabilizing. Cat dies after the battle with Madame Hydra. The other Exiles save Neramani's world, with Rogue remaining behind since she has fallen in love with one of the Saurians.

Valeria Richards arrives at the Crystal Palace and joins the team, having been able to discern its location. Some time later, the New Exiles return to Gambit's world, where he discovers his father has died and he takes over as king, leaving the Exiles. Sabretooth and Psylocke begin a relationship. They, Sage, Morph, Valeria Richards, and Mystiq are the New Exiles.

=== Second Series ===
The series was once again relaunched in April 2009, written by Jeff Parker and drawn by Salvador Espin, but canceled in September 2009. Alternate versions of The Witch, Beast, Forge, Polaris, and The Panther are picked up right before their intended deaths and put together as a team with the returning Blink, though she pretends to be new to all of this just as much as the others. Morph acts as the Timebroker and this version of the Black Panther is T'Challa's son, T'Chaka. On their first mission, they are teleported away without finishing their mission, to Blink's shock.

The team then goes to an Earth where Cerebro has killed all humans in North America. Working with the renegade Vision, Ultron, and Machine Man, the Exiles manage to disable Cerebro and give all the humans life model decoy bodies. After that mission, Morph tells the Exiles that they still have time to break up the X-Men/Brotherhood alliance from their first mission. They head back to that Earth and replace the native Scarlet Witch for their own. She reveals to Jean that Scott and Emma are having an affair, turning the telepaths against each other and dissolving the alliance. Emma Frost eventually kills the Witch from the Exiles' team, leaving the native Scarlet Witch to secretly join the Exiles.

The team then takes a vacation on a peaceful Earth. During this time, Polaris reveals she can tell Blink is lying, so Forge builds a device to send everyone to where the Tallus was transmitting from. Forge plants the device on the Tallus during the next teleport and Panther knocks Blink out. The Exiles then discover and head inside the Crystal Palace.

There, they see multiple teams of Exiles being trained by various "Timebrokers". Blink finds them and decides to explain everything. She says she was going to wait until the team got the hang of saving broken realities, then fake her own death, at which point a new member was to replace her. The team is teleported to the main room, where they find Heather (no longer pregnant), Nocturne (recovered from her stroke), and Morph waiting.

The three of them reveal to the latest Exiles team that the last Exiles team, Sage, Sabretooth, Mystiq, Valeria, Rogue, and Gambit eventually became immersed within the Crystal Palace. Only Morph was spared, since he had Proteus possessing him, and the Crystal Palace absorbed Proteus in Morph's place. Heather reveals that she came up with the idea of snatching the new recruits at the moment of death, as it seemed to be "the least disruptive way to go".

Polaris, Forge, Beast, and Panther all look at how their homeworlds turned out after they died. They all decide to continue working as a team and are each given their own Tallus. Nocturne goes with them in Blink's place for the next mission while Blink begins to train a new team.

==== After the series' end ====
- Psylocke was returned to Earth-616 via the Red Queen's magic and was briefly brainwashed into fighting alongside her sisterhood against the X-Men before being freed by Dazzler. Psylocke has also been shown to lose her immunity to magic spells, telepathic attacks, and reality alterations, as she was later possessed by Earth-616 Proteus.
- Sabretooth was liberated from Panoptichron's stasis gallery and returned to the Age of Apocalypse. He later met up with Psylocke when she visited his reality and he and his X-Men helped her and X-Force steal a celestial artifact. After the two teams parted ways, most of his reality's X-Men were killed. Only he and Jean Grey were spared, but depowered. They escaped into the hands of William Stryker's "X-Terminated," who arrested and imprisoned Sabretooth almost immediately. Sabretooth later sacrificed himself to save the rest of his team during the "X-Termination" event.
- Sage was also liberated from Panoptichron's stasis gallery and served as S.W.O.R.D.'s ambassador on another world. She met up with her former New Excalibur teammate Dazzler, who was visiting that reality to rescue a teammate. Sage left her job with S.W.O.R.D. behind to join Dazzler's team, who were hopping around realities throughout the multiverse and performing missions to save realities, much like the Exiles.
- Spider-Man 2099 and Mary Jane are still together when the attacks of Morlun during the "Spider-Verse" storyline are felt. Miguel learned about Morlun during his tenure with the Exiles, and senses Morlun is out there killing spiders. He gathers some of the Exiles' old equipment and prepares to flee to Earth-616, where Morlun was once killed. However, just as Miguel and Mary Jane are about to make the jump, Morlun arrives and kills that Miguel in front of the Miguel from the original timeline stranded in the present. Morlun disappears and the portal closes, leaving the Exiles' Miguel dead and the 616 Miguel desperate to find Peter Parker.

=== Third Series ===
The man once known as Nick Fury recruits champions from alternate universes when a mysterious threat casts its shadow on the multiverse. Blink would be joined by a Kamala Khan from a post-apocalyptic reality, Iron Lad, Wolvie and Valkyrie in her journey to save the multiverse. The team is later joined by Peggy Carter as the Captain America of her universe, and Rikki Barnes.

== Weapon X ==
First seen in Exiles #5, they are a team that complete missions more ruthlessly than those of the Exiles. This team had various members and its roster changed more than the Exiles. Weapon X was originally composed of Sabretooth, Kane, Mesmero, Wolverine, Maverick, and Deadpool.

Weapon X was finally disbanded when the Exiles arrived and both Blink and Gambit received the mission: Weapon X and the Exiles were meant to fight to the death until only six remained. Magik, and Hulk were killed by Hyperion, while Firestar killed the Spider, immolating herself in the process. Ms. Marvel was killed in battle with Morph and finally, Hyperion was killed thanks to Gambit's sacrifice. Instead of six survivors, there were only five: Blink, Mimic, Morph, Sasquatch and Nocturne.

The Exiles wouldn't meet any member of Weapon X until their visit to the Panoptichron, in which they saw all former members of Exiles and Weapon X placed in stasis in one of the galleries of the Crystal Palace. After the Exiles contained the threat of Proteus they went about returning the bodies of the deceased to their native homeworlds, including all former Weapon X members, for proper burials.

== Other versions ==
- In Uncanny X-Men #461, Mojo summons a team of lawyers modeled after the Exiles team to capture his recently created X-Babies. The team consisted of versions of Blink, Morph, Mimic, Sunfire, Sasquatch, and Nocturne.
- Red Skull led a team of WW2 era former Axis Power super-villains, dubbed "The Exiles", from "Exile Island", to conquer and establish a "4th Reich" in Doctor Doom's Latveria. The team includes, a fez wearing "Baldini"- who is master of his whip-like scarf; "Hauptmann- who welds an Iron Hand; "Krushki"- "the most skilled and powerful of all Wrestlers"; and "Cadavus"-"Monarch of the Murder Chair", a wheel Chair, weaponized with powerful firearms.

== In other media ==
- In the animated What If...?, the Watchers describe as "Exiles" another group of Multiverse-traveling heroes, better known as the Guardians of the Multiverse.
