= Blink (character) =

Superhero from Marvel Comics

- Blink as she appears in "Age of Apocalypse" (1995).

Publication information
- Publisher: Marvel Comics
- First appearance: The Uncanny X-Men #317 (Oct. 1994)
- Created by: Scott Lobdell; Joe Madureira

In-story information
- Alter ego: Clarice Ferguson
- Species: Human mutant
- Place of origin: Earth-295
- Team affiliations: X-Men (AoA); Exiles
- Abilities: Trans-spatial displacement bills; Teleportation warp portals; Bio-molecular spatial displacement; Displacement field gars; Skilled hand-to-hand combatant; Skilled marksman

Blink (Clarice Ferguson) is a superheroine appearing in American comic books published by Marvel Comics. Created by writer Scott Lobdell and artist Joe Madureira, Blink is the pink-skinned mutant leader of the Exiles, a group tasked with correcting problems in various alternate worlds and divergent timelines in the Marvel Multiverse. "Redefined" from an Earth-616 variant of the character previously created by Lobdell and Madureira for the crossover event "The Phalanx Covenant" as a member of Generation X killed by the Phalanx, who first appeared in The Uncanny X-Men #317 (October 1994), the "Pink Blink" of Earth-295 is considered a breakout character, serving as the protagonist of the ongoing series Exiles and limited series Blink.

A Chinese version of Blink named Clarice Fong is introduced in the X-Men feature film X-Men: Days of Future Past (2014), portrayed by Fan Bingbing, with Jamie Chung subsequently portraying a younger version of Fong in the television series The Gifted (2017–2019).

== Publication history ==
Created by writer Scott Lobdell and artist Joe Madureira, Blink first appeared in The Uncanny X-Men #317 (Oct. 1994).

An unstable mutant with the ability to teleport, Blink was one of the mutants captured by the Phalanx during the 1994 X-Universe crossover event Phalanx Covenant. In print, the character died within a month of her first appearance. The primary-universe version of Blink returned to publication in 2009.

Lobdell and Madureira redefined Blink as a more confident and assertive character in the parallel universe storyline "Age of Apocalypse" (1995). As a result of her redefinition and increased exposure during that event, Blink became a fan favorite, as exemplified in her return in the regular title Exiles in 2001. The character was featured in the four-issue Blink limited series in 2000.

== Fictional character biography ==
Blink is introduced in the "Phalanx Covenant" storyline as an inexperienced teleporting mutant who is killed by the titular race. The more widely published version of Blink is a variant from the "Age of Apocalypse" alternate reality of Earth-295. This version of Blink but exhibits a more refined power set, having mastered several methods of utilizing her powers. In addition to opening portals, she can also focus her ability into short, transparent, crystal-like javelins, which teleport whatever persons or objects they touch. She can charge her javelins so they can cut through objects by teleporting the matter elsewhere as they strike or they can be charged to stun opponents unconscious by putting them "out of phase". She usually keeps a supply of these in a quiver around her back, but can make them, one at a time, at will. Her teleportation is always accompanied by a "blink!" sound, from which she takes her codename. She has proven many times to be a skilled hand-to-hand fighter.

=== Early years ===
In the Age of Apocalypse storyline, Charles Xavier is killed years before he would have formed the X-Men. This creates an alternate timeline in which the ancient mutant Apocalypse gains control of North America and implements a genocidal campaign against humans.

Clarice Ferguson was born in Cartusia, Bahamas. Her purple skin complexion revealed her to be a mutant at birth. Her parents accepted this fact, but feared their daughter would not be accepted by the local population. When Clarice was four, the Fergusons moved to Miami, Florida, in the United States. They hoped Miami would be home to a mutant population where an older Clarice would be able to socialize.

Clarice was a child when Apocalypse took over Miami. Blink was discovered by Apocalypse's Horseman, Mister Sinister, and his right-hand Dark Beast, who experimented on her, refining her powers. Sabretooth and Weapon X, members of a resistance against Apocalypse, raid Beast's laboratories and rescue Blink, who is unofficially adopted by Sabretooth. The Age of Apocalypse timeline is erased from existence when a time-traveling Bishop sets off a course of events that prevents the death of Professor X.

=== Exiles ===
Blink survives the destruction of her timeline and is transported to a strange plateau, where she meets a group of other mutants from various realities who had been unstuck in time. A cosmic monitor called the Timebroker explains that each of them had become "unhinged" from reality and tasks them with visiting various parallel worlds and correcting their wrongs. If they fail in the mission, Blink will cease to exist.

Blink becomes the leader of the Exiles, with her teammates reasoning that her reality is more removed from the realities that they were familiar with and that she would be better equipped emotionally to make whatever judgement calls might be needed if they were forced to fight counterparts of their former allies.

The Timebroker later introduces Sabretooth onto the team, aiming to disrupt the group's dynamic. This causes Blink to doubt her leadership abilities and defer to Sabretooth's advice. The Timebroker instructs Blink to kill Mimic, who she had been in love with, but she refuses. The Tallus shifts from her arm to Sabretooth's, making him the de facto leader.

When Proteus escapes to another reality, the Exiles seek to track him down, feeling responsible for his release—Proteus had discovered the existence of alternate realities via the Tallus. Proteus possesses Mimic, and Blink is unable to save him before he dies from the effects of Proteus' possession.

Swearing revenge, the Exiles track Proteus down to the Future Imperfect reality, but are unable to stop him from possessing Morph. Morph's unique physiology prevents Proteus' possession from killing him, and he convinces Proteus to share his body. With the hunt for Proteus at an end, Blink remains with the Exiles. She returns Mimic's corpse to his home reality for burial and spends time with his version of the X-Men, but declines their offer to join.

Blink temporarily leaves the Exiles, but is called back into action when the New Exiles (minus Morph and Psylocke) are trapped in the Crystal Palace. Morph, now operating as the Timebroker, summons Blink and Nocturne to form a new team of Exiles: Beast, Forge, Polaris, Panther, and the Witch.

== Characteristics ==
=== Ancestry ===
In the Apocalypse Vs Dracula mini series written by Frank Tieri, it is revealed that in 1897 London, Apocalypse's genetic descendants called the Clan Akkaba had a member called Frederick Slade. Slade was characterized with pink hair and eyes that were tinted green, and he had the ability to teleport himself, others, and selected objects with a 'blink' effect. In the hope that the Clan Akkaba would still continue, Apocalypse's servant Ozymandias made sure that Frederick would sire a child with a woman known as Miss Ferguson. Given the similarity in powers and allusions made within the mini series, it is assumed that Clarice Ferguson/Blink is a descendant of the 19th century Frederick Slade and Miss Ferguson and therefore a descendant of Apocalypse.

Slade showed up still alive but elderly in an issue of New Excalibur and leading a new Clan Akkaba along with Ozymandias.

=== Appearance ===
Blink possesses lilac skin, dark magenta hair, pointed ears, and pupil-less green eyes. In her original depiction in Age of Apocalypse, Blink had white eyes, with her appearance being changed in Exiles. She also has pink marks across her face: these are not decorations or tattoos, and were present from birth.

=== Powers and abilities ===
Blink can teleport herself and large masses, including sizable groups of people. She can also use her powers in a destructive manner by teleporting only parts of objects. She can open portals that displace projectiles and even enemies that threaten her. Blink's portals are typically pink and accompanied by a "Blink" sound. She has proven to be a very skilled hand-to-hand fighter, having honed her skills by training with Sabretooth.

== Reception ==
=== Accolades ===
- In 2014, BuzzFeed ranked Blink 46th in their "95 X-Men Members Ranked From Worst To Best" list.
- In 2014, Entertainment Weekly ranked Blink 10th in their "Let's rank every X-Man ever" list.
- In 2017, Screen Rant ranked Blink 11th in their "15 Most Powerful Teleporting Superheroes" list.
- In 2020, Scary Mommy included Blink in their "Looking For A Role Model? These 195+ Marvel Female Characters Are Truly Heroic" list.
- In 2020, CBR.com ranked Blink 9th in their "10 Most Powerful Teleporters In The Marvel Universe" list.

== Other versions ==
=== Earth-616 ===
Blink (Earth-616)
- Blink as she appears in New Mutants vol. 3 #34. Art by Jorge Molina.

Publication information
- Publisher: Marvel Comics
- First appearance: The Uncanny X-Men #317 (October 1994)
- Created by: Scott Lobdell (writer); Joe Madureira (artist)

In-story information
- Alter ego: Clarice Ferguson
- Species: Human mutant
- Team affiliations: New Mutants; X-Men; Inner Circle; Generation X
- Partnerships: Selene
- Abilities: Trans-spatial displacement bills; Teleportation warp portals

In the primary Earth-616 continuity of the Marvel Universe, Blink is introduced in the "Phalanx Covenant" storyline, in which the alien Phalanx capture her and several other young mutants to assimilate their powers. This version of Blink is unable to properly control her powers, causing anything caught in her teleportation field to be shredded. Blink uses her abilities to "cut up" Harvest, a Phalanx entity guarding her and her peers, but is caught in her own teleportation field and dies in the process.

Prior to the events of "Necrosha", Selene gathers a new Inner Circle consisting of mutants with death-related powers - Eli Bard, Wither, Mortis, and Senyaka. Selene travels to the site where Blink had died and manages to summon her. It is revealed that Blink had actually been stranded in Erebus after her fight with Harvest, where she remained in a state near death. After healing her, Selene manipulates Blink by stating she has been looking for her for a while and could hear her crying out for help. Selene furthers her manipulations by telling Blink that Emma Frost could hear her as well, but left her behind, claiming she was too dangerous to save. Selene convinces Blink to join her cause, claiming to be able to put an end to her cycle of pain and betrayal. After Selene is defeated, Blink flees with Mortis.

Sometime after the events of "Necrosha", Emma Frost, Blindfold, Pixie, Husk, Warpath, and Doctor Strange track Blink down in Eastern Europe, where she is attempting to resurrect Selene. After a brief battle, Blindfold predicts Blink is going to commit suicide, but she is stopped by Frost, who makes her realize that Selene lied to her. Strange steps in and casts a spell which purges Blink of Selene's influence. Overcome with remorse, Blink teleports away.

Following the "Schism" event, Cypher begins looking for Blink and discovers a series of natural disasters connected to a band. Working with the New Mutants, Cypher discovers that the band is being controlled by part of a sentient extraterrestrial ship, creating violent chaos energy as a call for help. After dispatching the ship, Blink is offered the chance of going back to Utopia or Westchester; Blink chooses the latter and joins Wolverine at the Jean Grey School for Higher Learning.

=== Ultimate Marvel ===
The Ultimate Marvel version of Blink is first seen during the selection process for Emma Frost's Academy of Tomorrow, from which she is rejected. Later, Blink is mentioned as having participated and been killed in a mutant-hunting game show run by Mojo Adams.

=== Ultimate Universe ===
Am alternate universe version of Blink from Earth-6160 makes a minor appearance in Ultimate Spider-Man: Incursion.

=== What If? ===
Blink as the In-Betweener.

An alternate version of Blink appears in What If? vol. 2 #75. In this story, Blink survives, but the other young mutants die in her place. Blink ends up in the realm of the In-Betweener, and seems to kill him in battle. Blink uses her newfound reality-warping powers to "improve" the world, and among other things causes human/mutant conflict to end. When she attempts to save the members of Generation X from their deaths, the resulting paradox (if Generation X survived, then Blink could never gain her new powers in the first place) causes reality to begin disintegrating. Ultimately, Blink undoes all the changes she had made, and the In-Betweener reveals that he had not died. He takes Blink on as his apprentice, training her in the use of her new powers as a new In-Betweener.

== In other media ==
=== Television ===
- An alternate timeline incarnation of Blink makes a non-speaking cameo appearance in the X-Men: The Animated Series two-part episode "One Man's Worth" as a member of a mutant resistance movement.
- Blink makes non-speaking appearances in Wolverine and the X-Men as a resident of Genosha and member of Magneto's Acolytes.
- Clarice Fong / Blink appears in The Gifted, portrayed by Jamie Chung. This version is a mutant fugitive who joins the Mutant Underground and later becomes the girlfriend of John Proudstar.

=== Film ===
Clarice Fong / Blink appears in X-Men: Days of Future Past, portrayed by Fan Bingbing. This version is a member of a future incarnation of the X-Men from the year 2023 and is part of a resistance against the Sentinels.

=== Video games ===
Blink appears in X-Men Legends II: Rise of Apocalypse, voiced by Tara Strong.
