= Spiral (character) =

Rita Wayword Spiral
- Spiral as depicted in Exiles #18 (December 2002). Art by Mike McKone.

Publication information
- Publisher: Marvel Comics
- First appearance: Longshot #1 (September 1985)
- Created by: Ann Nocenti (writer); Arthur Adams (artist)

In-story information
- Alter ego: Rita Wayword
- Species: Human mutate
- Team affiliations: Sisterhood of Mutants; Freedom Force; X-Force
- Partnerships: Mojo
- Notable aliases: "Ricochet" Rita; The Apocalypse
- Abilities: Multiple arms; Spell casting; Superhuman strength, agility, reflexes, stamina and durability; Skilled in cybernetics and genetic manipulation; Skilled hand-to-hand combatant; Skilled acrobat

Spiral (Rita Wayword) is a supervillain appearing in American comic books published by Marvel Comics, usually those featuring the X-Men family of characters. Created by writer Ann Nocenti and artist Art Adams, the character first appeared in Longshot #1 (September 1985). Spiral was a human stunt-woman, before being enslaved and transformed into a six-armed sorcerer by Mojo.

Spiral was established as a lieutenant for Longshot's archenemy, Mojo. Prior to Longshot joining the X-Men, Spiral also became a recurring adversary of the various X-Men subgroups, as well as serving as the archenemy-turned-ally of X-Men member Psylocke. She later joined a team of X-Force led by X-Men member Storm.

== Publication history ==
Spiral first appeared in issue #1 of the 1985 Longshot miniseries by Ann Nocenti and Art Adams (though her alter ego Ricochet Rita did not debut until the second issue of the series), and subsequently appeared two months later as a member of Mystique's Freedom Force team in Uncanny X-Men #199. Spiral began as one of 20 minor characters that Adams designed on a character sheet as the pursuers of the character Longshot. Her six arms were inspired by deities in Hindu mythology. Although Adams gave little thought to Spiral, as he had developed ideas for the other characters he had drawn on the sheet, Nocenti decided to make her a major character, and gave her the name Spiral. The character sheet is reproduced in the back of the X-Men: Longshot hardcover collection.

In the final issue of the limited series, Spiral is hinted to be a former lover of Longshot. Chris Claremont portrayed her as having a pathological hatred for Longshot, and implied that the two were former lovers during a hallucinatory dream sequence in Uncanny X-Men #248.

As conceived, Spiral and Ricochet Rita were two separate entities. When the character was co-opted by Claremont for use in the pages of Uncanny X-Men, this was continued with Rita appearing in the pages of Excalibur: Mojo Mayhem and Uncanny X-Men Annual #12 as a prisoner of Mojo.

In X-Factor Annual #7, writer Fabian Nicieza established that Rita and Spiral were the same person, and that her hatred for Longshot was driven by her desire for revenge from being taken prisoner, driven insane, and physically modified by Mojo and his chief scientist Arize. It also stated that after turning her into Spiral (an event that will take place at some point in the future), Mojo sent her back to the past to serve his past self and set forth the chain of events that will lead to Rita becoming Spiral.

== Fictional character biography ==
=== Origins ===
Rita Wayford is a professional human stunt performer who is captured by Mojo after following Longshot into the Mojoverse. After her spirit is broken by several years of imprisonment, Rita is subjected to extensive physical surgeries and modification procedures to serve Mojo, becoming a tall and muscular white-haired woman with six arms (two of which are robotic). Rita is also trained in dark magic and body modification, allowing her to alter and mutilate others as Mojo had mutilated her. Pleased with his new servant, Mojo completes Spiral's transformation by sending her back in time to set into motion the events that led to her former self following Longshot and eventually becoming Spiral.

=== Freedom Force ===
In the past, Spiral is stranded on Earth after failing to kill Longshot and Rita. At some unknown point, Spiral encounters Valerie Cooper and joins Freedom Force, a revamped version of the second Brotherhood of Mutants. She also runs the "Body Shoppe", which sells alien cybernetic parts to amputees and others who seek the power of cybernetic limbs. Most notably, Spiral transformed Lady Deathstrike into a cyborg and installed cybernetic eyes in Betsy Braddock's original body, which doubled as cameras for Mojo to spy on the X-Men.

Spiral battles Psylocke (X-Men vol. 2 #32) Cover by Andy Kubert.

Along with Mojo, Spiral played a role in Betsy Braddock's physical appearance changing from that of a purple-haired Anglo-Saxon to an East Asian. Originally, it was believed that the two literally transformed Braddock's original European body to an Asian one, but it was revealed that Spiral had swapped her consciousness with that of Kwannon, a Japanese assassin. She also merged the two women's minds and genetic structures, giving each of them personality traits and physical characteristics of the other, as well as halving Psylocke's telepathy between them.

Spiral is approached by the Dragons of the Crimson Dawn, a group of monks with ties to the Crimson Dawn, that travelled to the magical dimension of the Wildways, the home of Spiral when not serving Mojo. The monks threaten Spiral so she will teleport them to Earth, which she reluctantly does and receives the mark of the Crimson Dawn. The Dragons take Brian Braddock prisoner, intending to channel his powers to breach the dimensional wall to the Crimson Dawn and enslave Earth, but are thwarted by Excalibur, but Brian loses his powers. The Dragons leave, vowing that one day they will succeed and rule Earth. Spiral returns to Mojo, who purges the Crimson Dawn from her.

=== 2000s ===
Just prior to the "House of M" storyline, Spiral and Mojo attack the X-Men, transforming them into their X-Babies form, but are defeated.

In the miniseries X-Force: Shatterstar, Spiral is revealed to have conquered an alternate timeline and referred to herself as "The Apocalypse", killing most heroes, with only Cable and some of his X-Force/New Mutants allies left. It is implied that, with the aid of Shatterstar, Spiral was defeated and returned to Mojo's services. She later attacks the X-Men together with Mojo, but is defeated once again.

Spiral and Mojo are among the nine criminal geniuses whom Beast seeks out to reverse the effects of the 2005 storyline "Decimation". However, Spiral explains that she cannot help, due to the Decimation not being the cause of science.

==== Sisterhood of Mutants ====
While repairing Lady Deathstrike after the events of "Messiah Complex", Spiral joins the Red Queen's Sisterhood of Mutants. The Sisterhood kidnap Psylocke and steal Kwannon's corpse from her grave in Tokyo. The Red Queen and Spiral transfer the soul of the kidnapped Psylocke back into her original body. Later, the Sisterhood take on the X-Men. Spiral seriously injures Nightcrawler and Colossus before the Sisterhood retreat.

Back at base, the Sisterhood split up, leaving the Mastermind sisters and Psylocke behind while Spiral and the rest of the Sisterhood go to Jean Grey's burial site. When Pryor is defeated by the X-Men, Spiral teleports away with the remainder of the team.

=== 2010s ===
==== X-Force ====
Spiral in her X-Force uniform on the variant cover of Uncanny X-Force Vol. 2 #2. Art by Ed McGuinness.

At some point, Spiral is exiled back to Earth by Mojo and stripped of her teleportation ability. Spiral resides in Los Angeles, where she takes in a homeless mutant girl, Ginny Guzman, and uses her to create a recreational drug. Spiral later joins Storm's incarnation of X-Force, helping defeat Cassandra Nova and Stryfe.

Spiral returns to Mojo's service, trapping Gambit and Rogue into Mojo's shows.

== Powers and abilities ==
Spiral has powerful mystical abilities. When Spiral was first introduced, she was a powerful sorceress and during her first two encounters with the X-Men, singlehandedly defeated the team. She can cast spells to stun, depower, or immobilize her superhuman opponents, as she did to depower and imprison the Avengers and West Coast Avengers once they were lying still long enough for the spells to catch them. On a mission to capture Magneto as part of Mystique's Freedom Force, Spiral was able to cast spells to negate Magneto's powers and turn them back on himself, while subsequently casting a spell to bind him. Spiral has been able to psionically detect a speeding Super Sabre approaching Mystique's base of operations and react fast enough to teleport outside the compound and afterwards trip the speedster. In New Avengers #53, she was revealed by the Eye of Agamotto as one of several magic-users with the potential to be the next Sorcerer Supreme after Doctor Strange. Spiral's spellcasting powers can be triggered through small gestures of her many hands. With the gestures, she can teleport herself and numerous people across great distances. More powerful spells require more complicated dance moves. Spiral can open gateways between dimensions and travel through time, although it has been implied that she sometimes requires Mojo's help to successfully teleport from one dimension to another. At other times, she has independently traversed dimensions and centuries of time, and set herself slightly out of phase with the timestream so as to avoid blows. Spiral often incorporates knives and swords into more complicated spells. Spiral can also disguise herself through her magic.

Spiral's mind is apparently immune to possession. When Rogue attempted to steal Spiral's mind and powers, Spiral stole Rogue's instead, laughing that she had danced in many people's souls. Nocturne was fooled by Spiral into thinking Spiral had been possessed while Spiral remained in control.

According to Mystique, Spiral is aware whenever a person speaks her name by the usage of "quasi-sentient sensors", which filters out mundane uses of the word "spiral". Due to her cybernetic enhancements, she has some limited level of superhuman physical attributes.

Spiral is a skilled hand-to-hand combatant, acrobat, and sword fighter. Her six arms are fully coordinated, giving her dexterity and athletic ability. She has displayed durability, enduring punches from Wonder Man and surviving falls from heights. Spiral is also skilled in cybernetics and genetic manipulation, which she has used to turn humans into powerful cyborgs, including Lady Deathstrike and the Reavers.

== Reception ==
=== Accolades ===
- In 2019, Comic Book Resources (CBR) ranked Spiral 17th in their "21 Most Powerful Sorcerer Supreme Candidates" list.
- In 2020, Scary Mommy included Spiral in their "Looking For A Role Model? These 195+ Marvel Female Characters Are Truly Heroic" list.

== Other versions ==
=== Age of Revelation ===
An alternate universe version of Spiral appears in "Age of Revelation". This version is Longshot's agent.

=== Old Man Logan ===
An alternate universe version of Spiral appears in Old Man Logan #1.

=== Ultimate Marvel ===
The Ultimate Marvel incarnation of Spiral as depicted in Ultimate X-Men #55 (March 2005). Art by Stuart Immonen.

An alternate universe version of Spiral appears in the Ultimate Marvel universe. This version is a citizen of Genosha and the on-and-off girlfriend of Longshot. Additionally, she is a mutant who possesses six arms and wields a variety of weapons. Spiral was previously in love with Longshot, but betrayed him when having an affair with a human mutant-sponsor named Lord Scheele. When Longshot learned of the affair, he killed Scheele in a fit of rage and Spiral knocked him out. She confronted the Ultimate X-Men about it when they came to Genosha to investigate. With the aid of Jean Grey's telepathic powers, Longshot's guilt was proven. The X-Men later allow Spiral to emigrate to the United States and join her sister, who is also a mutant.

== In other media ==
=== Television ===
- Spiral appears in X-Men: The Animated Series, voiced by Cynthia Belliveau.
  - Spiral appears in the X-Men '97 episode "Motendo", voiced by Abby Trott.
- Spiral appears in the Wolverine and the X-Men episode "X-Calibre", voiced by Grey DeLisle. This version is the leader of the Reavers.

=== Video games ===
- Spiral appears as a playable character in X-Men: Children of the Atom, voiced by Catherine Disher.
- Spiral appears as a playable character in Marvel vs. Capcom 2: New Age of Heroes, voiced again by Catherine Disher.
- Spiral appears in X-Men: Mojo World.
- Spiral appears in Viewtiful Joe's ending in Marvel vs. Capcom 3: Fate of Two Worlds as a producer for a police procedural that he is starring in.
- Spiral appears as an unlockable character in Marvel Avengers Alliance.
- Spiral appears in Marvel's Deadpool VR, voiced by Julia Jones.

=== Miscellaneous ===
- Iron Studios released a statue of Spiral in 2022.
- Hasbro released a Marvel Legends Retro figure of Spiral in 2023.
- Funko released a Target exclusive Pop! 8-bit figure in 2024.
