= X-Babies =

Fictional comic book group

Publication information
- Publisher: Marvel Comics
- First appearance: Uncanny X-Men Annual #12 (June 1988)
- Created by: Chris Claremont

In-story information
- Member(s): Colossusus; Creepy Crawler; Cyke; Jean Grey; Psychild; Shadowkitty; Shower; Sugah; Wolvie

The X-Babies are a group of fictional characters appearing in American comic books published by Marvel Comics. They are depicted as being Mojo-manufactured child clones of the X-Men. They first appeared in Uncanny X-Men Annual #12 and were created by Chris Claremont and Arthur Adams.

In line with Mojo being a parody of network executives, the X-Babies parody the modern trend of creating younger and junior versions of cartoon characters, which began in the 1980s with Muppet Babies.

== Fictional character biography ==
In Uncanny X-Men Annual #10 (also by Claremont and Adams), Mojo de-aged the X-Men (Nightcrawler, Shadowcat, Wolverine, Rogue, Magneto, Psylocke, Colossus, Storm and Longshot) into children; this is what most likely inspired the creation of the X-Babies.

In Uncanny X-Men Annual #12, the X-Men are assumed to be dead (having died in Dallas only to be resurrected by the goddess Roma). Missing his greatest rating generators, Mojo had his people try to recreate his own version of the X-Men. After many unsuccessful attempts, the X-Babies were created. They soon rebel against Mojo. Mojo was about to kill them when he was told that their ratings were the highest ever recorded.

There have been several incarnations of the X-Babies over the years, usually resembling the current team of X-Men. There has also been a similar team instead based on the Avengers, called the Mitey 'Vengers, who appeared in the X-Babies Reborn one-shot. There have also been several X-Babies villain teams including the "Brotherhood of Bullies" based on the Brotherhood of Mutants (X-Babies Murderama, 1998).

In Excalibur: Mojo Mayhem (1989), Kitty Pryde, interrupted on a train trip, helps a team of X-Babies flee from a Mojo enforcer who is intent on getting them back by tricking them into signing contracts. In this incarnation, the children's childlike faults and crushes on each other are cruelly exploited by their adversary. Kitty, with backup, ends up saving the day.

Several incarnations of the X-Babies are friendly with Ricochet Rita, the good past-self of the villain Spiral. Due to Spiral's time travel abilities, Rita, the babies, and Spiral can all exist at the same period simultaneously.

In Exiles #8, it is shown that the reality-hopping Exiles encountered a version of the X-Babies. It is not stated whether these X-Babies are the creation of Mojo or the X-Men of the reality in question. In fact, no further details are given except for the narrative commentary "The less said about this, the better". The X-Baby Wolvie would then become a permanent member.

In the X-Babies four issue limited series (2009), the X-Babies discover their position as Mojo's number one rating grabber had been usurped by the newer, cuter, but more shallow in personality 'Adorable X-Babies'. This version of the X-Babies were created by Mojo's rival Mr. Veech and have a much more expansive roster, including members of the New Mutants, X-Force, X-Factor, Generation X, Excalibur, the Xavier Institute student body, X-Statix, and the Chicago Morlocks.

In 2012, a spoof comic called A-Babies Vs. X-Babies was released as a tie-in to the Avengers vs. X-Men event.

== Members ==
=== Current members ===
- Colossusus - A baby clone of Colossus. He is also known as Baby Colossus.
- Creepy Crawler - A baby clone of Nightcrawler.
- Cyke - A baby clone of Cyclops. He is also known as Tyke and Baby Colossus.
- Jean Grey - A baby clone of Jean Grey. She is also known as Baby Phoenix.
- Shadowkitty - A baby clone of Shadowcat.
- Psychild - A baby clone of Psylocke.
- Shower - A baby clone of Storm.
- Sugah - A baby clone of Rogue.
- Wolvie - A baby clone of Wolverine. He is also known as Bub, Little Logan, and Baby Wolverine.

=== Former members ===
- Beast
- Boyo - A baby clone of Banshee.
- Cannonball
- Charlie X - A baby clone of Professor X.
- Iceboy - A baby clone of Iceman.
- Karma
- Kid Britain - A baby clone of Captain Britain.
- Lil' Archangel - A baby clone of Archangel.
- Lil' Bishop - A baby clone of Bishop.
- Lil' Dazzler - A baby clone of Dazzler.
- Lil' Gambit - A baby clone of Gambit.
- Lil' Havok - A baby clone of Havok.
- Lil' Longshot - A baby clone of Longshot.
- Locksteed - A Lockheed-type creature that was freed from Funhouse's clutches by Cyke.
- Magma
- Meggan
- Mirage
- Phoenix
- Sunfire
- Sunspot
- Thunderbird
- Warlock - A baby clone of Warlock.
- Widget
- Wolfsbane

== Bibliography ==
- Uncanny X-Men Annual #10 (1986) - Note: This is the X-Men team reduced to children.
- Uncanny X-Men Annual #12 (1988)
- Excalibur: Mojo Mayhem (1989)
- Uncanny X-Men Annual #17 (1993)
- X-Men #46-47 (1995)
- Wolverine Special Vol. 1 #102.5 (1996)
- X-Babies: Murderama (1998)
- X-Babies: Reborn (2000)
- Uncanny X-Men #393 (2001)
- X-Men Unlimited #32 (2001)
- X-Men Unlimited #37 (2002)
- Exiles #8 (2002)
- X-Men Unlimited #50 (2003)
- Uncanny X-Men #461 (2005) - Note: This is the X-Men team reduced to children.
- X-Babies #1 - #4 (2009)
- A-Babies Vs. X-Babies #1 (2012)
- Spider-Man and the X-Men #3 (2015)

== See also ==
- Super Jrs.
- Tiny Titans
