= Timebroker =

The Timebroker

Publication information
- Publisher: Marvel Comics
- First appearance: Exiles #1 (August 2001)
- Created by: Judd Winick; Mike McKone

The Timebroker is a character appearing in American comic books published by Marvel Comics. The character was created by Judd Winick for the comic book Exiles; a psychic construct created by the Timebreakers, an insectoid species who accidentally damaged a large number of alternate universes.

== Fictional character biography ==
The Timebroker first appears in Exiles #1, when he invites the Age of Apocalypse version of Blink to join a group of dimension-lost superheroes whom he named "The Exiles", whose mission would be to repair damaged realities. A team member whose home reality is repaired is immediately sent home, and replaced with someone new.

To repair each damaged reality, the Exiles must complete a mission given to them by the Timebroker through a communications device called the Tallus, worn by the leader of the group. These missions are usually humanitarian or heroic in nature, but sometimes involve assassination.

The Timebroker creates a separate team of lost heroes, called Weapon X, whose job is mainly wetwork. When they grow out of control, the Timebroker orders the Exiles and Weapon X to battle each other until only six remain.

In Exiles #53, the Exiles receive a warning: "Beware the Timebreaker. He is not what he seems." Almost immediately after, the Timebroker acts irrationally, giving orders to murder the Age of Apocalypse X-Men as well as the Exiles' Mimic. The Exiles later learn that the Timebroker is an illusory entity created by the Timebreakers to trick the Exiles and Weapon X into fixing the realities that they had damaged.
