= Changeling (Marvel Comics character) =

Marvel Comics fictional character

Publication information
- Publisher: Marvel Comics
- First appearance: The X-Men #35 (August 1967)
- Created by: Roy Thomas; Werner Roth

In-story information
- Species: Human mutant
- Team affiliations: X-Men; Factor Three; X-Humed
- Notable aliases: Charles Xavier; Morph
- Abilities: Shapeshifting; Psionic powers; Levitation; Skilled actor; Highly trained and efficient organizer; Good prankster; Expert computer engineer

Changeling (Kevin Sidney) is a fictional character appearing in American comic books published by Marvel Comics. Created by writer Roy Thomas and artist Werner Roth, the character first appeared in The X-Men #35 (Aug. 1967).

Changeling is a mutant shapeshifter and was a short-lived adversary for the X-Men who impersonated Professor X and died shortly after, making him the first member of the X-Men to die in action.

A character loosely inspired by Changeling named Morph was featured in the animated series X-Men: The Animated Series and X-Men '97, who was then adapted to the 2001 series Exiles as an alternate-universe version of Changeling. The original Changeling was resurrected in the 2025 series Astonishing X-Men, now resembling Morph's appearance in X-Men '97.

== Publication history ==
Changeling was introduced in The X-Men #37–42, part of the Factor Three storyline. Although dying at the end of this run, he was thought to have been seen as a ghost in Excalibur: The Possession (1991) and returned as a zombie in The Sensational She-Hulk #34–35 (1991–1992).

The character was later the basis for an easygoing comic-relief character in X-Men: The Animated Series named Morph. According to showrunner Eric Lewald's behind-the-scenes book, Previously on X-Men: The Making of an Animated Series, the creators (including writer Mark Edward Edens) had intended for Thunderbird to be the series' early sacrifice, but they became uncomfortable with the idea of killing off a Native American character. After the creators searched the comics for a substitute, they found Changeling, who was repurposed for the series. Changeling's codename was changed to Morph because DC Comics owned the trademark to "Changeling" when the series debuted.

Morph's first comic book appearance was 1992's X-Men Adventures #1, which adapted the "Night of the Sentinels" TV pilot. Then in 1995, inspired by the character in the animated series, a new Morph was featured in the "Age of Apocalypse" crossover event, debuting in the one-shot comic X-Men Alpha. The character underwent a drastic change in appearance for this event, appearing white-skinned and hairless. Then in 2001, Marvel introduced an alternate-reality version of this Morph, from Earth-1081. He first appeared in Exiles #1.

The original Changeling was resurrected in the series Astonishing X-Men (2025), where he assumes the name and blank white appearance of Morph.

== Fictional character biography ==
Kevin Sidney, known as Changeling, originally works for the villainous organization Factor Three. He acts as the Mutant Master's second-in-command in an effort to trigger World War III. After capturing the X-Men, the Mutant Master is exposed as an extraterrestrial and goes out of control. The members of Factor Three work with the X-Men to defeat the Mutant Master.

Following that group's defeat, Changeling seeks to reform. He divulges to Professor X that he has an unspecified terminal illness with only a few months left to live and wishes to atone for his misdeeds. Professor X recruits Changeling to act as a stand-in, unbeknownst to the X-Men, while he isolates himself to prepare a defense against the alien Z'Nox's invasion. Changeling, masquerading as Professor X, leads the X-Men's efforts to defeat Grotesk, who kills him in battle. The X-Men mourn the loss of Professor X until they learn that he was an impostor.

Changeling is one of several mutants who are resurrected by Black Talon to form the team X-Humed. He attacks She-Hulk, but breaks from Black Talon's control long enough to allow She-Hulk to win and lay the zombies back to rest.

In the series Astonishing X-Men, Changeling is revealed to have been resurrected on Krakoa and is reimagined as possessing the appearance and name of his alternate universe counterpart Morph. He acts as both a superhero and supervillain, being unaware of his dual identity.

== Powers and abilities ==
Changeling is a mutant metamorph with the ability to alter his physical appearance and voice at will to resemble that of any person he chooses. His power can also transform the appearance of his costume as well, which was made of unstable molecules. Morph's mutation to shape-shift has also made it so that his body is a Play-Doh-like substance and he can reattach limbs after they have been severed. He has limited telepathic abilities, which were enhanced by Professor X.

Upon choosing to work together and share his body with the energy mutant Proteus, the Exiles version of Morph had his powers amplified, at least enough to defeat a self-proclaimed god. It is not specified whether Morph had access to Proteus' reality-warping abilities.

Kevin Sidney is a skilled actor, and a highly trained and efficient organizer of subversive activities. He carried various advanced weaponry of alien Siri design belonging to Factor Three, including a ray gun carried in a holster at his side. Though Morph is a prankster who downplays his intelligence, he is deceptively smart. He has a Master's degree in computer engineering, which he earned at Xavier's Institute.

== Other versions ==
=== Age of Apocalypse ===
In the Age of Apocalypse reality, Morph appears as a member of the X-Men.

=== Earth-1081 ===
The Exiles incarnation of Morph as depicted in Exiles #2 (September 2001). Art by Mike McKone.

Morph is a hero from Earth-1081 who is a member of the New Mutants, X-Men, and Avengers. He was born with his mutant powers activated, causing him to resemble a humanoid white blob. Morph initially assumes a human appearance, only comfortable to be himself around his parents. Following his mother's death from lung cancer, Morph is enrolled in the Xavier Institute. Promoted to the X-Men, Morph's sense of humor initially grates upon the much more serious team but eventually his humor and humility win them over. He is instrumental in many of the team's victories and is chosen to be part of a pilot program with the Avengers, along with Beast, as a public representative of mutants. Morph returns to his birth appearance as a pale, bald humanoid.

While battling a threat known only as Stonehenge, Morph becomes unhinged from time. The mysterious Timebroker appears to him, explaining that his unhinging is the result of a chain of events that caused his reality to change. In this new reality, Morph is unable to maintain his body and is rendered comatose. Hoping to save his own future, Morph joins the Exiles, a group of universe-hopping heroes trying to save realities from ripples and alteration. Morph is later possessed by Proteus, but manages to convince Proteus to work together with him and share his body. When the Exiles are trapped in the Crystal Palace, Proteus is absorbed in Morph's place, freeing Morph from him. Morph is later killed by Maniac Xavier, an alternate universe version of Charles Xavier.

== In other media ==
=== Television ===
- Morph appears in X-Men: The Animated Series, voiced by Ron Rubin. This version is a member of the X-Men and close friend of Wolverine.
  - Morph appears in X-Men '97, voiced by J. P. Karliak. As of this series, they have taken on a featureless default form, having rejoined the X-Men once more. The series also depicts Morph as non-binary.

=== Video games ===
- The Exiles incarnation of Morph appears in Marvel Heroes, voiced by Tom Kenny.
- Morph appears in Marvel Snap.
