= Jim Calafiore =

American comic book penciller and inker

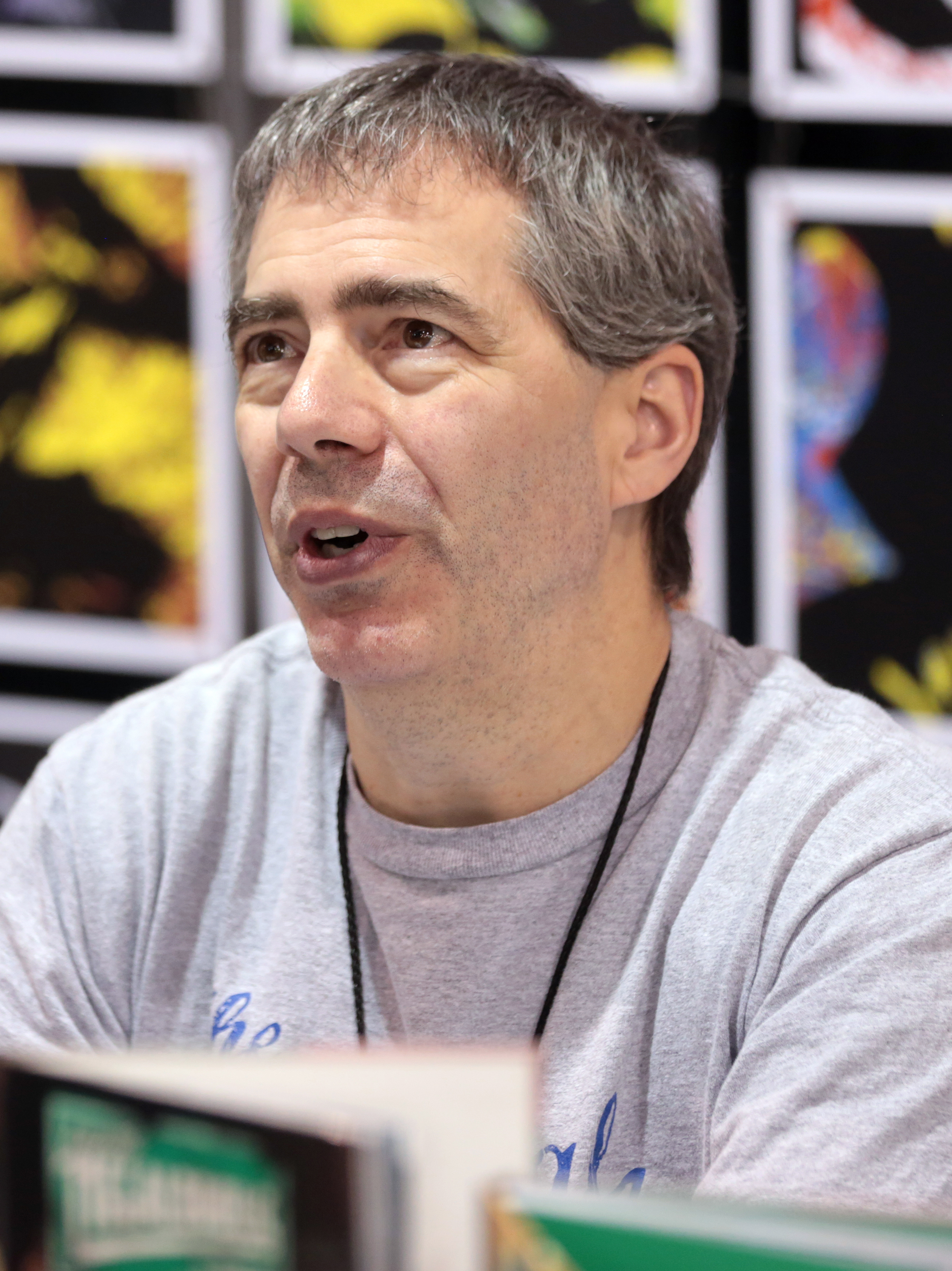
- Calafiore at the 2018 Phoenix Comic Fest in Phoenix, Arizona
- Area: Penciller
- Notable works: Aquaman, Exiles

Jim Calafiore is an American comic book penciller and inker, known for his work on Marvel Comics Exiles, and DC Comics' Aquaman. His other work includes Faction Paradox, and writing Marvel's Exiles and Millennium Visions.

Calafiore created the character Nocturne, who is the daughter of Nightcrawler and the Scarlet Witch from an alternate reality.

== Partial bibliography ==
=== As penciler ===
- Excalibur #119
- Deadpool Vol. 3 #37, 42–45, 61, 64
- Exiles #5, 6, 11, 16, 17, 21, 22, 31, 32, 34, 38–45, 49, 52, 53, 55–57, 60, 61, 66–68, 75–78, 81, 82, 84, 89
- Iron Man v1 #325 (50/50)
- New Excalibur #13-15
- X-Men Unlimited #13, 19
- Batgirl V2 #1-6
- Gotham Underground #1-9
- Camelot Eternal #1- (Caliber Press)
- Secret Six vol 3 #15, 17-22, 24-28, 30-36

=== As writer ===
- Exiles #41, 42
