= Thunderbird (John Proudstar) =

Marvel Comics fictional character

- Thunderbird as depicted in Classic X-Men #3 (November 1986). Art by Art Adams.

Publication information
- Publisher: Marvel Comics
- First appearance: Giant-Size X-Men #1 (May 1975)
- Created by: Len Wein (writer); Dave Cockrum (artist)

In-story information
- Alter ego: John Proudstar
- Species: Human mutant
- Team affiliations: X-Men; United States Marine Corps
- Abilities: Superhuman physical abilities and senses

Thunderbird (John Proudstar) is a character appearing in American comic books published by Marvel Comics. Created by writer Len Wein and artist Dave Cockrum, the character first appears in Giant-Size X-Men #1 (May 1975). Thunderbird was a short-lived member of the Second Genesis group of X-Men gathered in the issue, as he died on their second mission, where they tried to chase down Count Nefaria. His death is also depicted in X-Men: Grand Design – Second Genesis #1, where his death is witnessed by Banshee, and felt deeply by the X-Men and Charles Xavier.

An Apache Native American and Human Mutant, John Proudstar possesses superhuman athletic ability. Since his death, Thunderbird was temporarily brought back to life during the Necrosha and Chaos War storylines, before being permanently resurrected after the establishment of Krakoa. His brother James Proudstar, known first as Thunderbird, and then as Warpath, is also a mutant and X-Men with similar capabilities.

In addition to his mainstream incarnations, Thunderbird has been depicted in other fictional universes. The most notable alternative version of the character is a member of the original Exiles team. In other media, Thunderbird is one of the main characters in the live-action television series The Gifted, portrayed by Blair Redford.

== Publication history ==
Writer Len Wein and artist Dave Cockrum created Thunderbird for the new X-Men, specifically to be a member of the team who would fail the entrance exam. Having already decided that the previously introduced characters Sunfire and Banshee would fail the exam, Wein and Cockrum felt it would be unrealistic for only older characters to "flunk out", and set about creating a new character to fit this role. After developing Thunderbird, however, they decided that they liked the character — his costume in particular — too much to write him off after only one issue, and decided to keep him on.

The character debuted in Giant-Size X-Men #1 (May 1975). While working on the first issues of the regular series, the creative team realized that having Thunderbird as a regular character was problematic. According to Cockrum, "...we created him as an obnoxious loudmouth, and we already had an obnoxious loudmouth in Wolverine. So one of us decided to kill him off after all, just for shock value." Chris Claremont, who scripted the story, confirms that it was Wein who decided to kill the character, and added, "He figured there are two ways to do this. One, you spend years, if not decades, building up a relationship between the audience and a character, building the emotional bonds between them so when something happens to that character the audience is devastated. Or you do it right off the bat, when no one is expecting it." The story culminating in Thunderbird's death appeared in X-Men #94-95.

In 2000, for the 25th anniversary of the introduction of Thunderbird, writer Scott Lobdell and artist Aaron Lopresti did a two-issue series about the character, with a cover by Art Adams. Marvel Comics never published the series. At the same period, after nine years of absence, Chris Claremont returned to the X-Men to take over the titles. According to Brian Cronin from Comic Book Resources, there were likely two events that led to the cancellation of this mini-series. Firstly, Claremont introduced a new X-Man character Neal Shaara with the codename Thunderbird. Secondly, Claremont had his own project for the 25th anniversary: X-Men: Black Sun, which had a spotlight comic on the various members of the All-New, All-Different X-Men, including one on Thunderbird with his partner Wolverine. In 2010, the character appeared in the front of a teaser featuring X-Men characters believed to be dead titled "All New, All Different". Thunderbird was one of the feature characters in the 2011 two-issue limited series Chaos War: X-Men.

John Proudstar was resurrected in the main comics continuity in X-Men: The Trial of Magneto #5 (2021), over 45 years after his death. He starred in a solo one-shot Giant-Size X-Men: Thunderbird #1 (2022), where he received a new costume.

Proudstar later appeared in the Weapon X-Men (2025) series, returning to his original costume minus the feathers. He maintained his role as a member of the team throughout the series.

== Fictional character biography ==
John Proudstar was born into an Apache tribe on a reservation in Camp Verde, Arizona. As a teenager, he discovered he possessed the mutant abilities of superhuman senses, strength, speed, stamina, and sturdiness.

While he was a teenager, John's mother Maria fell sick as Edwin Martynec lied to her that she had cancer. He also targeted John's brother James only for John and his reporter friend to thwart him.

Proudstar was drafted into the United States Marine Corps during the Vietnam War and earned the rank of corporal. He returned to his tribe after the war, but he was unhappy and listless.

He was then recruited by Professor Charles Xavier to join his third group of X-Men. Eager to prove his prowess, Proudstar agreed and assumed the superhero codename Thunderbird. He assisted the other X-Men in rescuing the original X-Men from Krakoa the mutant island. (Note: Len Wein (w), Dave Cockrum (p), Dave Cockrum (i), Peter Iro (i), "Deadly Genesis!", Giant-Size X-Men #1 (May, 1975). Marvel Comics.)

During the weeks of training that followed, the ill-tempered and individualistic Thunderbird often found himself going head to head with the X-Men's leader Cyclops. The new team's second mission took them to Valhalla Base, Colorado, to combat Count Nefaria and the Ani-Men. (Note: Chris Claremont (w), Dave Cockrum (p), Bob McLeod (i), "The Doomsmith Scenario!", Uncanny X-Men#94 (August, 1975). Marvel Comics.) When Nefaria attempted to make his escape in a jet plane, Proudstar leapt on board. Disregarding Professor X's orders to jump to safety, Thunderbird hammered at it with his bare fists. The plane exploded, killing Proudstar. (Note: Chris Claremont (w), Len Wein (w), Dave Cockrum (p), Sam Grainger (i), "Warhunt!", Uncanny X-Men #95 (October, 1975). Marvel Comics.) Nefaria is later revealed to have survived the crash. (Note: Jim Shooter (w), John Byrne (w, p), Pablo Marcos (i), "To Fall by Treachery!", Avengers #164 (October, 1977). Marvel Comics.)

James Proudstar has similar powers, although to a much greater degree. He is also an X-Man who first used the codename Thunderbird and then switched to Warpath when he joined X-Force team.

When Warpath goes to visit Thunderbird's grave during the Necrosha storyline, he encounters the Demon Bear. After defeating the creature, with the aid of Ghost Rider, he learns that former Purifier Eli Bard has dug up Thunderbird and everyone else buried there. (Note: Craig Kyle (w), Chris Yost (w), Mike Choi (p, i), "Old Ghosts" (Part 4), X-Force vol.3 #10 (February, 2009). Marvel Comics.) It is revealed that Bard used a version of the Technarch virus to resurrect Thunderbird and the others as his servants. (Note: Craig Kyle (w), Chris Yost (w), Clayton Crain (p, i), Alina Urusov (p, i), "Who the Hell is Eli Bard?", X-Force vol.3 #11 (March, 2009). Marvel Comics.) Thunderbird is later seen with Selene's Inner Circle and Caliban being led to the ruins of Genosha, which she dubs Necrosha. (Note: Craig Kyle (w), Chris Yost (w), Clayton Crain (p, i), "Necrosha" (Part 1), Necrosha #1 (December, 2009). Marvel Comics.) Thunderbird fights Warpath, who snaps his neck and then kills Selene. Thunderbird's spirit is seen departing, telling his brother that he "can let go now". (Note: Craig Kyle (w), Chris Yost (w), Clayton Crain (p, i), "Necrosha: Conclusion", X-Force vol. 3 #25. Marvel Comics.)

During the "Chaos War" storyline, Thunderbird is among the fallen X-Men members (along with Banshee, Moira MacTaggert, Esme and Sophie of the Stepford Cuckoos, and three clones of Multiple Man) who escape from the underworld. He remembers the last time he was revived briefly during the events of Necrosha, albeit faintly. Thunderbird leads the revived X-Men members to looking for a diary written by Destiny that might hold the key to defeating Amatsu-Mikaboshi while evading Carrion Crow, Eater of the Dead. (Note: Louise Simonson (w), Chris Claremont (w), Doug Braithwaite (p, i), "Dead X-Men" (Part 1), Chaos War: X-Men #1 (February, 2011). Marvel Comics.) Thunderbird called upon the mythical Thunderbird to get him and his group away from Carrion Crow. He and the group discover that MacTaggert has been possessed by Destiny's ghost. Following the defeat of Amatsu-Mikaboshi, Thunderbird is returned to the afterlife. Thunderbird contemplates that his life finally means something and hopes that next time he is resurrected, it will be with Sophie. (Note: Louise Simonson (w), Chris Claremont (w), Doug Braithwaite (p, i), "Dead X-Men" (Part 2), Chaos War: X-Men #2 (March, 2011))

When the X-Men made Krakoa a mutant paradise, the resurrection protocols brought back many dead mutants, including Thunderbird. His resurrection is shown in the Trial of Magneto arc (during Reign of X).

Following his resurrection, John Proudstar pays a visit to the Apache reservation. Upon arrival, he learns that some of the reservation's residents were arrested after refusing to give up the mutants who lived there. As Thunderbird, John goes to the police station to demand the release of the people from Camp Gozhoo. When the sheriff declines, Thunderbird attacks and drives away the punks awaiting to be detained. Edwin Martynec arrives with Heritage Initiative operatives, planning to harvest the X-Genes from the Native Americans that he freed. Thunderbird subdues Martynec as his grandmother Lozen arrives. Thunderbird spares Martynec and throws him towards the Orchis operatives. When Martynec taunts Thunderbird, Lozen kicks him in the head as Thunderbird leaves. Back on the Apache reservation, Lozen agrees to keep the secret on how Thunderbird was revived. They are both visited by Warpath via a Krakoan gate, with Warpath meeting Lozen.

== Powers and abilities ==
Thunderbird is a mutant who possesses superhuman strength (sufficient to rip apart a fighter jet with his bare hands), speed (he is fast enough to outrun a bison, possibly much faster), and stamina due to his dense musculature. His senses are also enhanced, enabling him to be a highly adept tracker.

Thunderbird has military training in hand-to-hand combat.

== Analysis ==
In Native Americans in Comic Books - A Critical Study, Michael A. Sheyahshe compared John Proudstar to Tupac Shakur, noting that "Thunderbird becomes even more popular, posthumously, than he ever was while living."

In September 2001, Bill Rosemann, the marketing communications manager of Marvel Comics, announced that "The death of Thunderbird!", Uncanny X-Men #95 had been classed number 32 in the 100 best Marvel Comics.

== Reception ==
In 2014, Entertainment Weekly ranked Thunderbird and Warpath 62nd in their "Let's rank every X-Man ever" list.

== Other versions ==
=== Age of Apocalypse ===
In the Age of Apocalypse universe, John Proudstar is at the head of the religious group Ghost Dance whose members perform nightly dances asking the ancient spirits to bring an end to Apocalypse's reign. When Nightcrawler is tasked with retrieving the mutant Destiny, he forces Proudstar to provide him passage. (Note: Warren Ellis (w), Ken Lashley (p), Phil Moy (i), Bud LaRosa (i), Tom Wegrzyn (i), "The Infernal Gallop", X-Calibre #1 (March, 1995)) Betrayed by Danielle Moonstar, the Madri learn of Proudstar and the Infernal Gallop's location at Ghost Dance, killing all its members. (Note: Warren Ellis (w), Roger Cruz (p), Renato Arlem (p), Charles Mota (p), Eddie Wagner (p), Phil Moy (i), Tom Wegrzyn (i), Harry Candelario (i), "Burn", X-Calibre #2 (April, 1995). Marvel Comics.)

=== Earth X ===
An alternate universe version of John Proudstar / Thunderbird from Earth-9997 appears in "Earth X". (Note: Jim Krueger (s), Alex Ross (s), John Paul Leon (p), Bill Reinhold (i), Earth X #6 (September, 1999). Marvel Comics.) (Note: Jim Krueger (s), Alex Ross (s), John Paul Leon (p, i), Bill Reinhold (i), Earth X #7 (October, 1999). Marvel Comics.)

=== Exiles ===
An alternate universe version of John Proudstar / Thunderbird appears in Exiles. This version is a member of the eponymous team who is in a relationship with Nocturne and was transformed by Apocalypse into the Horseman of War, gaining enhanced strength and retractable armored plates. (Note: Exiles #1-10. Marvel Comics.)

=== House of M ===
An alternate universe version of John Proudstar from Earth-58163 appears in House of M. This version is a detective for the New York Police Department and the leader of the strike force known as the "Brotherhood." (Note: Christos N. Gage (w), Mike Perkins (p, i), Drew Hennessy (i), House of M: Avengers #2 (February, 2008). Marvel Comics.)

=== Ultimate Marvel ===
An alternate universe version of John Proudstar from Earth-1610, amalgamated with Shaman, appears in the Ultimate Marvel imprint.

=== What If? ===
Alternate versions of Thunderbird appear in What If?, a series whose stories explore how the Marvel Universe might have unfolded if key moments in its history had not occurred as they did in mainstream continuity.

- In "What If the X-Men Died on their First Mission?" (Earth-105709), Thunderbird is among the X-Men who die when Krakoa is hurled into space. (Note: Roy Thomas (w), Rich Buckler (p), Sam De La Rosa (i), "What If... The New X-Men Had Died On Their Very First Mission?", What If? vol. 2 #9 (January, 1990). MArvel Comics.)
- In "What If Professor X Became the Juggernaut?" (Earth-905), Thunderbird is part of Juggernaut's X-Men. (Note: Kurt Busiek (w), Vince Mielcarek (p), Ian Akin (i), Brian Garvey (i), "What If Professor X Had Become the Juggernaut?", What If? vol. 2 #13 (May, 1990). Marvel Comics.)
- In "What If an All-New All-Different X-Men Never Existed?" (Earth-913), Thunderbird was never recruited by Professor X and was allied with Erik the Red. He was quickly frozen by Iceman. (Note: Kurt Busiek (w), Rodney Ramos (p), Doug Hazlewood (i), "What If... The All-New All-Different X-Men Had Never Existed?", What If? vol. 2 #23 (March, 1991). Marvel Comics.)

== In other media ==
=== Television ===
- Thunderbird appears in the Spider-Man and His Amazing Friends episode "The X-Men Adventure", voiced by John Stephenson. This version is a member of the X-Men who possesses the ability to shapeshift into a variety of North American animals instead of his comic book abilities.
- Thunderbird makes non-speaking appearances in X-Men: The Animated Series. In the opening sequence, he appears as a member of Magneto's Brotherhood of Evil Mutants, a decision made by series producers Larry F. Houston and Will Meugniot, who sought to find equilibrium between the X-Men and their adversaries. In the episode "Slave Island", Thunderbird makes a cameo appearance as a resident of Genosha. In the book Previously on X-Men: The Making of an Animated Series, series showrunner Eric Lewald explained that Thunderbird was originally intended to die in the opening episodes, but was replaced with Kevin Sidney / Morph, who seemingly dies in the pilot episode "Night of the Sentinels" and resurfaces alive in later episodes.
- Thunderbird appears in The Gifted, portrayed by Blair Redford. This version is the leader of the Mutant Underground who was previously in a relationship with Dreamer and eventually goes on to enter a relationship with Blink.

=== Merchandise ===
- Thunderbird received a bust from Dynamic Forces in 2003.
- Thunderbird received Heroclix figures in their Uncanny X-Men line and Armor Wars line.
- Thunderbird received a figure from Marvel Legends as a part of a two-pack with Storm in their Giant Size costumes.

== Notes and references ==
=== Comic books ===
w: writer, p: penciler, i: inker
