= Mojo (comics) =

Fictional character in Marvel Comics

- Textless cover of The Uncanny X-Men #461 (Aug. 2005). Art by Frank Cho.

Publication information
- Publisher: Marvel Comics
- First appearance: Longshot #3 (Nov. 1985)
- Created by: Ann Nocenti; Art Adams

In-story information
- Species: Spineless One
- Team affiliations: Wildways; Baby Badies; Spineless Ones; X-Babies; Mighty 'Vengers (revolted); Exile Legal Eagles
- Partnerships: Spiral; Major Domo
- Abilities: Superhuman physical attributes Mystical powers

Mojo is a supervillain appearing in American comic books published by Marvel Comics, usually those featuring the X-Men family of characters. Created by writer Ann Nocenti and artist Arthur Adams, Mojo first appeared in Longshot #3 (Nov. 1985), as the titular hero's archenemy, and subsequently a villain to the X-Men and their various sub-groups as well.

Mojo is one of the "Spineless Ones", an alien race that is immobile without advanced technology. He is a slaver who rules the Mojoverse, a dimension where all beings are addicted to his gladiator-like television programs. The character is an absurdist parody of network executives, and was inspired by Nocenti's reading of media critics Marshall McLuhan, Noam Chomsky, and Walter Lippmann.

== Publication history ==
At the time she wrote the Longshot miniseries, writer Ann Nocenti was pursuing her Master's degree at the School of International and Public Affairs, Columbia University, working at the magazine Lies of Our Times, and reading the work of writers like Marshall McLuhan, Noam Chomsky, Edward S. Herman and Walter Lippmann. Mojo, a slaver and dictator who rules his dimension through the television programs he produces, was created as a direct result of these influences (a character named Manufactured Consent, after the Chomsky book of a similar name, who appeared in Nocenti's 1990 The New Mutants Summer Special, was also born of these works). Artist Art Adams designed the character per Nocenti's instructions that he be disgusting and unpleasant, and also tried to make him look frightening. The wires that hold Mojo's eyelids open, thus preventing him from blinking, were inspired by an interview with actor Malcolm McDowell on Late Night with David Letterman, in which McDowell revealed that the similar apparatus he had to wear for the Ludovico technique scene in A Clockwork Orange had scarred his corneas. The rest of the equipment attached to Mojo's head controls his mechanized chair.

Mojo first appeared in Longshot #3 (Nov. 1985), and was the main villain of the miniseries, appearing in the subsequent three issues.

The character subsequently appeared in The New Mutants Annual #2 (1986). That same year, in Uncanny X-Men Annual #10, Mojo appeared as the villain in the story, which saw Longshot join the X-Men. In 1988, Mojo appeared in a backup story in The Uncanny X-Men Annual #12. He was the main villain of the one-shot special Excalibur: Mojo Mayhem (Dec. 1989). Subsequent appearances include Marvel Comics Presents #89 (1991), The Uncanny X-Men Annual #15 (1991), Wolverine vol. 2 #52 (March 1992), X-Men #6 (March 1992), Wolverine vol. 2 #53 (April 1992), X-Men #7 (April 1992), #10-11 (July–Aug. 1992), The Uncanny X-Men Annual 16 (1992), Marvel Comics Presents #119 (1993), What If? vol. 2 #59 (March 1994), X-Men Adventures: Season Two #11 (Dec. 1994), Marvel: Portraits of the Universe #1 (March 1995), X-Men: Mutations #1 (1996), Youngblood/X-Force #1 (July 1996), X-Force/Youngblood #1 (Aug. 1996), X-Force #60-61 (Nov.–Dec. 1996), The Adventures of the X-Men #9-10 (1996-Jan. 1997), X-Babies: Murderama #1 (Jan. 1998), X-Force #76 (April 1998), X-Babies Reborn #1 (Jan. 2000), X-Men Unlimited #32 (Sept. 2001), Exiles #18-19 (Dec. 2002-Jan. 2003), The Uncanny X-Men #460-461 (Aug. 2005), and Exiles #73-74 (Feb. 2006).

Mojo was featured in an entry in The Official Handbook of the Marvel Universe Deluxe Edition #8, and in the All-New Official Handbook of the Marvel Universe A-Z #7 (2006).

Mojo appears in Ms. Marvel: Mutant Menace #2 (2024). Mojo is a major antagonist in the ongoing series NYX (vol. 2). Kofi Outlaw of ComicBook.com commented that "Mojo has been a consistent villain in his design – fate, yellow, slug-like" but "NYX has given Mojo a more active-looking design, with his cybernetics, armor, leather wristbands and a long, spiked, cybernetic tail".

== Fictional character biography ==
Most of the denizens of what would come to be called the Mojoverse were slowly driven insane by waves of energy from another dimension. They are unable to stand upright until the scientist Arize develops exoskeletons to assist them. Some members of the race refuse to use the exoskeletons and call themselves the Spineless Ones. The Spineless Ones utilize motorized platforms to transport their bodies and take over their dimension. Arize is forced to create humanoid slaves to serve the Spineless Ones, but implants them with the capability to turn against their masters. Arize is later banished by the Spineless Ones after refusing to create weapons for them.

Mojo, one of the Spineless Ones, assumes control of his dimension, calling it the Mojoverse. His followers, including Warwolves (dog-like metallic beings with the ability to kill people and take over the remains of their bodies as skins), become known as Wildways. Mojo is served by Major Domo, an android who oversees his financial records and relays commands to his servants. Major Domo is himself assisted by Minor Domo, a hysterical young girl prone to imagining worst-case scenarios.

One of Mojo's slaves, Longshot, attempts to lead a rebellion against him, but is captured and has his memories removed. Longshot escapes to Earth before returning to the Mojoverse alongside his friends Quark and Ricochet Rita to free Mojo's slaves. However, they are unsuccessful. Longshot is brainwashed again, while Rita is captured by Mojo, transformed into a six-armed warrior named Spiral, and sent back in time to attack Longshot and facilitate the events that led to her creation.

Mojo manipulates X-Men member Rachel Summers into working for him, but she escapes soon afterward. After the X-Men are killed by the Adversary, Mojo attempts to create versions of them who he can control. Mojo creates several versions of the X-Men, but he considers all of them failures and orders them to be killed. The X-Babies, child versions of the X-Men, emerge the sole survivors. They rebel against Mojo and escape, taking Rita with them.

Mojo is later demoted by the producers on Mojo World due to low ratings and moved to "Educational Broadcasting". He creates an agency named the Yellow Eye to spy on every single mutant alive. When Cable sends Domino to spy on this agency, she is captured and brainwashed by Mojo. His organization is eventually brought down by the X-Force.

In the 2016 Howard the Duck run, Mojo is revealed to have used footage of Howard's adventure to create a reality show for the Mojoverse. To fill in the gaps on Howard's life, Mojo films footage of a small alien in a duck costume interacting with Lea Thompson performing as Beverly Switzler (referencing the 1986 film adaptation of the character).

== Powers and abilities ==
Mojo's multi-legged flying platform is armed with various particle beam weapons. It also has a large artificial appendage that can be used as an arm or a slicing weapon and two smaller arms. He is strong enough to hold a human off of the ground with one arm easily. He has several powers derived from magic, like the projection of magical energy blasts, controlling the minds of others, and inter-dimensional teleportation. These magical powers are strengthened by the 'worship of his followers' and hence directly linked to the popularity of his TV programs. He cannot be harmed by the touch of Rogue, no matter how long she is in contact with him.

He is also a master manipulator and schemer, shown in his organization of his slaughter entertainment games. He can also call upon vast manpower to assist him in his endeavors and has access to vast technological resources.

Mojo is also a force of death and corruption, able to generate an anti-life field that makes his touch able to wither plants and age humans outside of his home dimension. According to Doctor Strange, his prolonged presence on Earth could cause storms and other natural disasters.

== Reception ==
Both Chris Miller of Screen Rant and Alex Schlesinger of AIPT highlighted Mojo's villain role in NYX (vol. 2). Miller commented that Mojo is "one of the X-Men's most terrifying villains, the master of multidimensional television called Mojo, has spent decades trying to forcefully conscript the X-Men into his trashy interdimensional shows, movies, and games". Miller noted that in NYX, Mojo is seen with a "new puppeteering power" which grants "him a terrifying degree of leverage over Earth". Schlesinger stated that he wished "Mojo was the main villain of the whole series" and he wanted "more TikTok Mojo". Schlesinger commented that Mojo "is horrifying in this comic. Mojo has often been seen as a silly, deranged… blob, that was always more ridiculous than he was terrifying. In NYX though, Mojo has been updated to our modern social media age, and Mortarino's depiction of Mojo is monstrous and scary, including his new 'Mr. Friend' disguise".

Sara Century of Collider expressed interest in seeing Mojo in the X-Men '97 series.

== Other characters named Mojo ==
=== Maggia member ===
Mojo was a member of the Maggia.

=== Mojo II ===
Mojo II is a clone of Mojo. After Mojo was ousted, Mojo II took over his business.

=== Mojo (robot) ===
While Mojo took a leave, Major Domo created a Mojo robot to help run Mojo's studio. It was destroyed by Rocket Raccoon and Groot.

== Other versions ==
Mojo Adams from Ultimate X-Men #54. Art by Stuart Immonen

=== Ultimate Marvel ===
In the series Ultimate X-Men, Mojo is Mojo Adams, a human television producer based in Genosha. He traps young mutant fugitive Longshot on an island where humans hunt him as part of a popular reality show, "Hunt for Justice". Mojo hires Deadpool and his Marauders to capture the X-Men and bring them back to Krakoa, where they are to be executed on live television by the Reavers. Mojo is foiled by the combined efforts of the X-Men and Spider-Man, who was also captured during his visit to the X-Mansion.

=== Age of Revelation ===
In an alternate universe depicted in the "Age of Revelation" storyline, Longshot leaves Mojo's service and refuses to return unless his pay is raised. Major Domo later tells Mojo that Galactus' agent turned down a deal. Mojo caves and accepts Longshot's terms.

== In other media ==
=== Television ===
Mojo as he appears in X-Men: The Animated Series

- Mojo appears in X-Men: The Animated Series, voiced by Peter Wildman. This version possesses a mechanical tail tipped with a laser cannon.
  - Mojo appears in the X-Men '97 episode "Motendo", voiced by David Errigo Jr.
- Mojo appears in Wolverine and the X-Men, voiced by Charlie Adler.
- Mojo appears in the Avengers Assemble episode "Mojo World", voiced by Ralph Garman. This version possesses a holographic human disguise based on his Ultimate Marvel counterpart.

=== Video games ===
- Mojo appears as a boss in X-Men.
- Mojo makes a cameo appearance in Spiral's ending in X-Men: Children of the Atom.
- Mojo appears as the final boss of X-Men: Mojo World.
- Mojo makes a cameo appearance in Viewtiful Joe's ending for Marvel vs. Capcom 3: Fate of Two Worlds as a producer for a police procedural that Joe is starring in.
- Mojo appears as a playable character in Marvel Contest of Champions.
- Mojo appears in Marvel Snap.
- Mojo appears in Marvel's Deadpool VR, voiced by John Leguizamo.

=== Merchandise ===
- In 1994, Toy Biz produced a Mojo action figure for their wave of X-Men: X-Force toys. A smaller die-cast metal version of the mold was also available under the banner "Steel Mutants" packaged with a Longshot figure.
- In 2002, a Unique HeroClix figure of Mojo was released in the "Clobberin' Time" set.
- In 2006, a "Build-A-Figure" Mojo toy was produced by Toy Biz for Wave 14 of their Marvel Legends toyline.
- In 2014, Bowen Designs produced a 17.5" tall statue of Mojo, which was designed and sculpted by the Kucharek Brothers.
