= Mimic (Marvel Comics) =

Marvel Comics fictional character

- Mimic

Publication information
- Publisher: Marvel Comics
- First appearance: The X-Men #19 (April 1966)
- Created by: Stan Lee (writer); Werner Roth (artist)

In-story information
- Alter ego: Calvin Montgomery Rankin
- Species: Human mutant (latent)
- Team affiliations: Brotherhood of Mutants; Dark X-Men; Jean Grey School; X-Men
- Abilities: Power mimicry Permanently possesses the original powers of the original five X-Men: Angel's flight Beast's animalistic physical traits Cyclops's optic force blasts Professor X and Jean Grey's psychic powers Iceman's ice control and manipulation

Mimic (Calvin Montgomery Rankin) is a fictional character appearing in American comic books published by Marvel Comics. He was briefly a member of the X-Men in the 1960s, and was the first character to be added to the team after the original line-up and the first X-Man who was not a mutant. A 2019 story revised the character and identified him as a mutant.

An alternate reality version of Mimic became a popular member of the Exiles, the reality-hopping team.

== Publication history ==
Created by writer Stan Lee and artist Werner Roth, he first appeared in The X-Men #19 (April 1966) as a villain.

== Fictional character biography ==
=== Origins ===
Calvin Rankin was born in Passaic, New Jersey. After an accidental mixup of chemicals from his father Ronald Rankin's experiments, his latent mutation activated and he gained the ability to temporarily copy the skills, physical traits, knowledge, and superpowers of any person within close range (approximately ten feet), which led people to fear him. When Ronald found out about this, he retreated with Calvin into a mine where his father worked on a machine which, as he claimed, would make the abilities his son absorbed permanent. However, these experiments with the device caused several power outages in the vicinity; to hold off the mob which was tracking these disturbances, Ronald blasted the mine entrance, but was accidentally caught and killed in the explosion, and the device sealed deep inside the mine.

=== With the X-Men ===
Calvin Rankin first encounters the X-Men when he gets into a fight with X-Men members Beast and Iceman in their civilian identities and duplicates their powers to defeat them. He later encounters Marvel Girl and learns her secret identity after copying her telekinesis. Rankin decides to seek out the X-Men in a plot to get to the machine and permanently copy their powers. Taking the costumed identity "Mimic", he takes Marvel Girl hostage and drives to the mine, knowing the rest of the X-Men will follow. As the others came near, he regained their abilities, and he uses Cyclops's optic blasts to break through the rubble to the machine. The other X-Men free Marvel Girl and battle Mimic. Initially, he gains the upper hand and activates the machine after using Professor X's power to understand how the machine works, but his powers are removed by Ronald's device, as Professor Xavier had expected. Xavier wipes Mimic's memory and lets him go.

Mimic regains his powers while attending the same college as Jean Grey. In another attempt to gain the X-Men's abilities, Mimic sets his sights on joining their ranks, becoming deputy leader in the process when he blackmails his way into joining the X-Men. As a member of the X-Men, he aids them against Banshee and Ogre of Factor Three, but soon begins to antagonize the other X-Men with his arrogant behavior and is expelled after a fight with Cyclops. Shortly afterwards, Mimic saves his ex-teammates from the Super-Adaptoid, defeating the android by tricking it into trying to copy his powers. This battle robs him of his abilities, and he is left powerless but a better person.

=== After the X-Men ===
Eventually, Mimic regains his powers, but they are enhanced to absorb people's life forces, killing them. As Beast tried to work out a solution, Calvin seemingly perished in a self-sacrificial fight against the Hulk after absorbing Hulk's gamma radiation. For a long time, the X-Men believed him to be dead. In actuality, Mimic was in a coma which lasted for years. Mimic woke up when Wolverine came near him, because his power copied Wolverine's healing ability. Mimic also ended up copying Wolverine's other powers, including his claws, but after a confrontation with Wolverine, the Hulk (in his "Joe Fixit" persona) and an artificial intelligence remnant of his father, he began learning self-control by a meditation technique Wolverine taught him.

Mimic's powers soon began to drain the life energy of those around him again. He fled to a remote Siberian village, where he soon encountered X-Force investigating a distress call. X-Force arrived to find a number of dead scientists and the enraged Mimic who illogically blamed X-Force for their deaths. During the fight, Mimic copied Sunspot's powers, and their identical charge caused a large explosion, after which Mimic disappeared.

Mimic was later recruited by the entity Onslaught and his powers stabilized. Along with the Blob, he confronted X-Force member Warpath. But with the assistance of Risque, Warpath was able to subdue them. Soon after, Onslaught himself was defeated and Operation: Zero Tolerance imprisoned Mimic. Later, Excalibur tracked his telepathic signature and freed him, thinking that he was Professor Xavier. He was injured in this encounter and came to Muir Island to recover.

=== Excalibur ===
Mimic became friends with Excalibur. He helps confront the threat of the misguided Feron confronting the team with the Crazy Gang and the Technet. Mimic attends Captain Britain's wedding.

Mimic later joined Mystique's Brotherhood of Mutants and assisted in freeing the real Xavier. That group eventually disbanded, and Mimic was not among later groupings.

=== Dark X-Men ===
During the Dark Reign storyline, Mimic joins Norman Osborn's Dark X-Men featured in Matt Fraction's The Uncanny X-Men stint where it was revealed that his unstable behavior was caused by his previously undiagnosed bipolar disorder which is now being treated with medication.

After Emma Frost and Namor defect to the X-Men taking Cloak and Dagger along with, Rankin continues as a member of Osborn's X-Men alongside former Brotherhood member Mystique, Weapon Omega and Dark Beast as they try to capture Nate Grey during Osborn's reign. Osborn forces Mimic to mimic the powers of Weapon Omega and forces the two to siphon Grey, succeeding in neutralizing Nate's powers at least temporarily.

=== Wolverine's X-Men ===
After Osborn was taken down by the Avengers following the Siege of Asgard, Mimic and Weapon Omega left H.A.M.M.E.R. where Weapon Omega's powers started acting up. Mimic went to Beast, the only person who had always aided him when he needed, for help. Mimic took Weapon Omega to the Xavier Institute where Beast found out that Weapon Omega was about to explode. The X-Men tried various ways to prevent the explosion. But in the end, the only way left outside of death was an induced artificial coma. Weapon Omega asked his only friend to do it and Mimic complied. Borrowing Rachel Summers' powers, Mimic put Weapon Omega to sleep promising to stay by the man's side until waking up. After the ordeal, he asked Rogue if he could stay at the school to which Rogue agrees noting that he is going to be a wonderful teacher.

Following the Avengers vs. X-Men storyline, Mimic and Rogue were the only ones to respond to a prison riot at an unnamed prison. Although they were overpowered by the villains Griffin, Icemaster, Lightmaster, Quicksand, Ruby Thursday, Schizoid Man, Silk Fever and Supercharger, Rogue and Mimic were able to stop the riot by copying the powers of Armadillo, Equinox and Man-Bull.

=== Extermination ===
When the mutant-hunting Ahab comes from the future to try and kill the time-displaced original five X-Men, a younger version of Cable abducts the displaced team to send them home after killing his future self. He also captures Mimic so that he can amputate Mimic's wings and transplant them to the younger Warren in place of his 'new' cosmically enhanced wings so as to preserve the timeline, but Mimic makes it clear that he knew what he was signing up for and agreed to the procedure. When Ahab tries to attack Cable's base, Mimic poses as the young Cyclops, distracting Ahab long enough for the young X-Men to return to their home time after finding a way to stop Ahab.

== Powers and abilities ==
Mimic has the mutant ability to copy the knowledge, skills, and powers (if any) of every individual within a certain range of him; different sources list this as anywhere from several feet to a mile radius. In his first appearances, he needed to get within about five feet to initially copy someone's powers, but once he copied them he would retain the abilities so long as he was within several miles of them, even if he left that radius and then returned later. This was established shortly after he joined the X-Men, when Professor X had him fly in increasing circles using Angel's wings and he flew beyond his copy range and the wings started to vanish, but they returned immediately when he turned back, but this has been retconned and changed several times. This applies to both superpowered and "normal" abilities, as shown when he duplicated Kitty Pryde's ninja training. He has shown the capacity to manifest numerous powers at the same time, and since he also absorbs knowledge, he can immediately use copied powers with the same skill level as the original owner. However, he occasionally shows difficulty in juggling multiple powers, and his body can be overloaded by absorbing too many at once. Usually, Mimic loses his duplicated abilities once out of range of the owner, but due to the length of time spent with them, his body permanently retains the powers of the original five X-Men: Angel, Beast, Cyclops, Iceman, and Marvel Girl. Thus, he has the powers of flight (granted by angelic wings) of Angel, the increased strength and agility of Beast (complete with enlarged hands and feet), the optic blasts of Cyclops, the temperature manipulation of Iceman, and the telekinesis of Jean Grey. He partly retains Professor X's telepathic powers, which once caused his telepathic signature to be mistaken for that of Charles Xavier.

== Reception ==
In 2014, Darren Franich of Entertainment Weekly ranked Mimic 78th in his "Let's rank every X-Man ever" list.

== Other versions ==
=== Age of Apocalypse ===
An alternate universe version of Calvin Rankin from Earth-295 appears in "Age of Apocalypse". This version is a prisoner and test subject of Sugar Man, who later kills him.

=== Civil War: House of M ===
An alternate universe version of Mimic from Earth-58163 appears in House of M. This version is a government agent.

=== Exiles ===
Mimic
- The cover to Exiles #45 depicting Mimic. Art by Mizuki Sakakibara.

Publication information
- Publisher: Marvel Comics
- First appearance: Exiles #1 (2001)
- Created by: Judd Winick; Mike McKone

In-story information
- Alter ego: Calvin Montgomery Rankin
- Species: Human Mutant
- Abilities: Permanent power mimicry limited to five people at half strength

Mimic's Earth-12 counterpart is a founding member of the multiverse-traveling Exiles superhero team. This version is only able to copy a maximum of five mutant powers at a time. The copied abilities are about half as powerful as those of the original owners, and he is not able to copy knowledge or skills. For most of his appearances, he retains the powers of Wolverine, Colossus, Cyclops, and Beast.

Mimic initially appears as a member of the Brotherhood of Mutants. After being defeated and imprisoned by the X-Men, Mimic is abandoned by the Brotherhood. He is freed by Professor X, who invites him to join the X-Men. Mimic eventually becomes leader of the X-Men and helps make his world one where mutants, along with other heroes, are respected and treated with a level of fame and celebrity.

Although Mimic is accustomed to leading, he defers leadership of the Exiles to Blink on the grounds that she is from a reality that is more removed from the 'mainstream' universe than the other Exiles, and will therefore be able to make the judgement calls that their missions require without being potentially compromised by her connection to the counterparts of their opponents. The Exiles' missions grow increasingly dangerous, and Mimic is forced to kill more than once to safeguard entire realities. Many of those he kills are alternate versions of heroes he knows as allies in his home reality and their deaths weigh heavily on his mind. Mimic's subsequent hesitation to kill, further compounded by an illusion in which Blink claims to no longer love him, allows the villain Proteus to possess him. Proteus' powers wither Mimic's body, eventually leaving him as a burnt husk.

=== The Big M ===
An alternate universe version of Mimic from Earth-5423 appears in Exiles. This version, also known as The Big M, is a notorious criminal and leader of the Brotherhood of Mutants. He killed his universe's X-Men and committed numerous other crimes — including mass murder — until he was captured by the Avengers and sent to a high-security prison. After encountering the Exiles version of Mimic, Mimic realizes that the only difference between the lives they led is that while one of them accepted Xavier's offer of training and help, the other rejected it and sought a more destructive path. He reforms and reinvents his Brotherhood as the second iteration of the X-Men.

=== Ultimate Marvel ===
An alternate universe version of Mimic from Earth-1610 appears in Ultimate Avengers vs New Ultimates. This version is a soldier who volunteered to be transformed into a prototype weapon known as Super Soldier. Super Soldier dies after he comes into contact with Scott Lang and his powers go haywire.

=== Marvel Noir ===
An alternate universe version of Calvin Rankin from Earth-90214 appears in Weapon X Noir. This version is a human spy.

== In other media ==
- Mimic makes a non-speaking cameo appearance in the X-Men: The Animated Series episode "One Man's Worth" as a member of a mutant resistance.
- Mimic makes a non-speaking cameo appearance in the X-Men '97 episode "Bright Eyes".
- Mimic appears in issue #6 of the X-Men: Evolution tie-in comic. This version's body does not change in appearance when he copies powers.
