= Mike McKone =

British comic book artist

- McKone at GalaxyCon Des Moines in 2026
- Born: Michael McKone
- Area: Penciller
- Notable works: Exiles; Fantastic Four; Teen Titans, vol. 3

Michael McKone is a British comic book artist.

== Career ==
McKone's first published works for the major companies included Justice League of America and Justice League International for DC Comics and The Punisher War Zone for Marvel Comics. However, it was his work on Marvel's Exiles which brought him instant attention, and led him to work on two of DC's Teen Titans and Marvel's Fantastic Four.

McKone is currently providing covers for Marvel, DC and Dynamite comics.

== Awards and recognition ==
In July 2010, McKone was named Inkwell Awards Special Ambassador.

== Bibliography ==
=== DC ===
- 52 #52 (among other artists) (2007)
- Adventures of Superman #579 (2000)
- Detective Comics #622-624 (along with Flint Henry) (1990)
- Green Lantern, vol. 3, 80-Page Giant #2 (among other artists) (1999)
- Green Lantern, vol. 4, #26-28 (2008)
- JLA: Secret Society Of Super-Heroes, miniseries, #1-2 (2000)
- JSA All Stars, miniseries, #4 (2003)
- Justice League International (then Justice League of America, vol. 2) #25, 28, 41–42, Annual #4 (1989–90)
- Justice League of America, vol. 4, Wedding Special (2007)
- Justice League Quarterly #3, 5 (1990)
- Justice League United #0-4 (2014)
- L.E.G.I.O.N. #Ann 2-3 (1992)
- Legion Worlds, miniseries, #6 (2001)
- Mister Miracle, vol. 2, #6 (1989)
- Parallax: Emerald Night (1996)
- Superman, vol. 2, #151-153 (1999–2000)
- Superman vs. Darkseid: Apokolips Now! (2003)
- Tangent Comics: Metal Men (1997)
- Teen Titans, vol. 3, #1-6, 9–12, 16–19, 21–23, 50 (2003–07)
- Vext, miniseries, #1-6 (1999)

=== Image ===
- Spartan: Warrior Spirit, miniseries, #1-4 (1995)

=== Marvel ===
- Amazing Spider-Man #562-563, 581–582, 592–594, 606, Annual #35 (full art); #607 (along with Adriana Melo), #660 (along with Stefano Caselli) (2008–11)
- Astonishing X-Men #44-45, 47 (2012)
- Avengers Academy #1-4, 6, 8-9 (2010–11)
- Exiles #1-4, 7–10, 12–15, 18-19 (2001–03)
- Fantastic Four #527-543 (2005–07)
- Fantastic Four: Big Town, miniseries, #1-4 (2001)
- Fear Itself: Spider-Man, miniseries, #1-3 (2011)
- Heroes Reborn: Doom #1
- New Avengers #63-64 (2010)
- The Punisher: War Zone #11-14 (1993)
- Thor, Vol. 2, #14 (1999)
- Uncanny X-Force #25 (2012)
- X-Men: Prime (among other artists) (1995)
- X-Men Unlimited #3 (1993)
- Avengers: Endless Wartime (2013)
