= Exiles (comic book) =

Comic book series

- Cover to Exiles #45 depicting Mimic.

Publication information
- Publisher: Marvel Comics
- Format: Ongoing series
- Genre: Superhero
- Main character: Exiles

Exiles is the name of multiple comic book titles featuring the team Exiles and published by Marvel Comics, beginning with the original Exiles comic book series which debuted in 2001.

== Publication history ==
=== Exiles volume 1 ===
Exiles was created by Mike Marts, Mike Raicht, Judd Winick, and artists Mike McKone and Jim Calafiore. Exiles was created after a period of development aimed at creating a new What If? book for Marvel. In an interview Raicht speaks of the Exiles' early origins: "We were eventually going to visit some alternate realities and flesh out some stories. We were attempting to give the readers a What If? X-Men book. Eventually that idea shifted into a Quantum Leap type thing where Blink, Morph, and maybe Sabretooth from the Age of Apocalypse would join some other heroes, most likely from the Millennial Visions books, to form a reality-hopping super team that righted wrongs."

Raicht and Winick developed the initial formula of Exiles' reality-hopping adventures. Chuck Austen came aboard as interim writer after Winick's move to DC Comics. Tony Bedard took over, writing roughly half the series, from #46-89. Chris Claremont came onboard as of issue #90 and ended the series with the crossover X-Men: Die by the Sword.

A number of artists have penciled the series including Mike McKone, Jim Calafiore, Kev Walker, Clayton Henry, Mizuki Sakakibara, Casey Jones, Steve Scott, Paul Pelletier, and Tom Mandrake.

Cyriaque Lamar of io9 described the storyline involving King Hyperion's dead planet to be one of "The 10 Most Depressing Alternate Realities From Marvel Comics".

=== New Exiles ===
Chris Claremont restarted the series in March 2008 as New Exiles, after the crossover X-Men: Die by the Sword. New Exiles #1 sold out prompting Marvel to release New Exiles #0 which collected Exiles #100 and Exiles: Days of Then and Now. New Exiles ran for 18 issues before being canceled.

Tom Grummett, Roberto Castro, Paco Diaz, and Tim Seeley worked on as artists on New Exiles.

=== Exiles volume 2 ===
A few months after New Exiles was cancelled, the series was restarted again with a second volume of Exiles. Writer Jeff Parker and artist Salvador Espin relaunched the series with a new #1 in April 2009, but the book was canceled after only six issues.

=== Exiles volume 3 ===
A third series was launched as part of Marvel Legacy, written by Saladin Ahmed joined by the art team of Javier Rodriguez, Alvaro Lopez, and Jordie Bellaire and Joe Caramagna. The man once known as Nick Fury recruits champions from alternate universes when a mysterious threat casts its shadow on the multiverse. A different Blink will be joined by a Kamala Khan from a post-apocalyptic reality, Iron Lad, Wolvie and Valkyrie in her journey to save the multiverse. The team is later joined by Peggy Carter as the Captain America of her universe, and a reincarnated Rikki Barnes.

== Collected editions ==
The series have been collected into trade paperbacks:

=== Exiles ===
- Volume 1: Down the Rabbit Hole (ISBN 0-7851-0833-5, collects Exiles #1–4)
- Volume 2: A World Apart (ISBN 0-7851-1021-6, collects Exiles #5–11)
- Volume 3: Out of Time (ISBN 0-7851-1085-2, collects Exiles #12–19)
- Volume 4: Legacy (ISBN 0-7851-1109-3, collects Exiles #20–25)
- Volume 5: Unnatural Instincts (ISBN 0-7851-1110-7, collects Exiles #26–30 and Exiles story from X-Men Unlimited #41)
- Volume 6: Fantastic Voyage (ISBN 0-7851-1197-2, collects Exiles #31–37)
- Volume 7: A Blink in Time (ISBN 0-7851-1235-9, collects Exiles #38–45)
- Volume 8: Earn Your Wings (ISBN 0-7851-1459-9, collects Exiles #46–51)
- Volume 9: Bump in the Night (ISBN 0-7851-1673-7, collects Exiles #52–58)
- Volume 10: Age of Apocalypse (ISBN 0-7851-1674-5, collects Exiles #59–61 and Age of Apocalypse Handbook 2005)
- Volume 11: Timebreakers (ISBN 0-7851-1730-X, collects Exiles #62–68)
- Volume 12: World Tour Book 1 (ISBN 0-7851-1854-3, collects Exiles #69–74)
- Volume 13: World Tour Book 2 (ISBN 0-7851-1855-1, collects Exiles #75–83)
- Volume 14: The New Exiles (ISBN 0-7851-2236-2, collects Exiles #84–89 and Annual #1)
- Volume 15: Enemy of the Stars (ISBN 0-7851-2390-3, collects Exiles #90–94)
- Volume 16: Starting Over (February 2008, ISBN 0-7851-2391-1, collects Exiles #95–100 and Exiles: Days of Then and Now)
- X-Men: Die by the Sword (March 2008, ISBN 0-7851-2791-7, collects X-Men: Die by the Sword 1-5)

=== Exiles Ultimate Collection ===
- Book 1 (April 2009, ISBN 0-7851-3887-0, collects Exiles #1–19)
- Book 2 (August 2009, ISBN 0-7851-3888-9, collects Exiles #20–37 and Exiles story from X-Men Unlimited #41)
- Book 3 (December 2009, ISBN 0-7851-3889-7, collects Exiles #38–58)
- Book 4 (April 2010, ISBN 978-0-7851-3890-7, collects Exiles #59–74 and the Age of Apocalypse Handbook 2005)
- Book 5 (September 2010, ISBN 978-0-7851-3891-4, collects Exiles #75–89 and the Exiles Annual #1)
- Book 6 (December 2010, ISBN 978-0-7851-3892-1, collects Exiles #90–100, Exiles: Days of Then and Now, and X-Men: Die By the Sword #1-5)

=== New Exiles ===
- Volume 1: New Life, New Gambit (ISBN 0-7851-2619-8, collects New Exiles #1–6)
- Volume 2: Soul Awakening (ISBN 0-7851-3416-6, collects New Exiles #7–12)
- Volume 3: The Enemy Within (ISBN 0-7851-3875-7, collects New Exiles #13–15 and Annual #1)
- Volume 4: Away We Go (ISBN 0-7851-3961-3, collects New Exiles #16–18 and X-Men: Sword of the Braddocks)

=== Exiles (2009) ===
- Exiles: Point Of No Return (ISBN 0-7851-4044-1, collects Exiles (2009) #1–6)
