= Abigail Brand =

Fictional character in Marvel Comics

- Agent Brand with Beast (left), Sydren (right), and Lockheed (above) in the background. Art by John Cassaday.

Publication information
- Publisher: Marvel Comics
- First appearance: Cameo: Astonishing X-Men vol. 3 #3 (September 2004); Full appearance: Astonishing X-Men vol. 3 #6 (December 2004)
- Created by: Joss Whedon; John Cassaday

In-story information
- Alter ego: Abigail Thanriaguiaxus
- Species: Human mutant / Alien hybrid
- Team affiliations: Alpha Flight; S.W.O.R.D. X-Men
- Partnerships: Beast
- Notable aliases: Commander Brand; Agent Brand
- Abilities: Pyrokinesis; Trained armed and unarmed combatant; Multilingualism

Abigail Brand (Abigail Thanriaguiaxus) is a character appearing in American comic books published by Marvel Comics. Created by writer Joss Whedon and artist John Cassaday, the character first appeared in Astonishing X-Men vol. 3 #3 (September 2004). Abigail Brand belongs to the subspecies of humans called mutants, who are born with superhuman abilities. She is the Commander of counterterrorism and intelligence agency S.W.O.R.D.

== Publication history ==
Abigail Brand debuted in Astonishing X-Men vol. 3 #3 (September 2004), created by writer Joss Whedon and artist John Cassaday. She appeared in the 2020 Empyre: Avengers Aftermath series. She appeared in the 2022 X-Men Red series, by writer Al Ewing and artist Stefano Caselli.

== Fictional character biography ==
=== Origin ===
Abigail Brand is the commanding officer of S.W.O.R.D., an offshoot of S.H.I.E.L.D. that defends Earth from extraterrestrial threats. Almost no details about her personal life have been revealed, but she is known to be 28 years old as of the Skrulls' "Secret Invasion".

=== Ord and Breakworld ===
When the alien Ord comes to Earth due to being convinced that a mutant was destined to destroy his planet, Brand intervenes to avert interplanetary war. Brand acquiesces to Ord's plan to avert Earth's destruction by allowing Ord to create a 'cure' for the mutant 'condition'. It is later revealed that the mutant prophesied to destroy Breakworld was Colossus.

After her involvement in this plan is made known to the X-Men and S.H.I.E.L.D. director Nick Fury, Brand faces a board of inquiry to answer charges against her conduct. She defends her actions on the grounds that averting interplanetary warfare was a responsibility so great as to justify courses of action that would otherwise be considered immoral or illegal. This defense seems to have convinced the board, as Brand remains in command of S.W.O.R.D.

In a final attempt to draw Breakworld's forces away from Earth, Brand has the X-Men (including Colossus), Ord, and Danger teleport aboard a starship of S.W.O.R.D. and travel to Breakworld itself. Despite their past differences and Brand's continuing high-handed attitude, she attempts to work with the X-Men to find a solution to the crisis. After arriving on Breakworld, Brand and Beast are separated from the other X-Men and forced to take shelter in a small cave to avoid a device that was altering weather to subfreezing temperatures. To Beast's astonishment, Brand demonstrates the ability to generate heat, allowing her to keep them both alive.

After meeting back up with the rest of the X-Men, Brand participates in an assault on Breakworld's doomsday device to stop it from destroying Earth. During the battle, Brand saves Beast from being hit by a laser and is severely wounded. While recovering, Brand admits to Beast that she is in love with him. It is also revealed that Brand is not her surname, but a sobriquet referencing her powers. Additionally, her father was an alien with a green, furry appearance similar to that of Beast.

=== Secret Invasion ===
Brand is present at the Peak, the headquarters of S.W.O.R.D., when it is destroyed by a Skrull posing as Dum Dum Dugan. Due to an emergency suit, she and a few other S.W.O.R.D. agents survive in space long enough to witness the arrival of the Skrull armada in Earth space. After boarding a Skrull ship, Brand witnesses the destruction the Skrulls are causing around Earth, which makes her shed a tear. Brand outsmarts the guards and kills every Skrull on board before freeing a captive Mister Fantastic, who returns her to Earth.

=== Aftermath ===
Beta Ray Bill visits Agent Brand aboard the rebuilt Peak seeking information on the whereabouts of Galactus. Brand confirms that S.W.O.R.D., as well as similar agencies of other species, share sightings of Galactus among themselves. Brand gives Bill the information but stressed that the world eater must never find out who gave him the information lest Galactus seek revenge on Earth. She also approaches Spider-Woman to recruit into S.W.O.R.D., which she accepts.

=== S.W.O.R.D. ===
Brand, along with Beast and Lockheed, starred in a 2009 five-issue S.W.O.R.D. series written by Kieron Gillen and drawn by Steven Sanders.

In the volume, Henry Peter Gyrich takes Brand and Lockheed, among other aliens, into custody as part of an effort to remove aliens from Earth. When the alien Drenx attack S.W.O.R.D., Brand, Beast, Lockheed, and Death's Head manage to defeat them, reversing Gyrich's actions and getting Gyrich dismissed from the organization.

Brand is seen helping Magneto to hide in the aftermath of the Avengers vs. X-Men event. She is also revealed to be a mutant as well having inherited her human mother's X-gene. Brand is later murdered by one of Legion's multiple personalities while saving fellow S.W.O.R.D. teammate Sydren. Brand is restored to life when Legion alters reality.

Brand develops a friendly relationship with Broo, an intelligent, friendly Brood who attends the Jean Grey School for Higher Learning. She attends as his 'parent' for graduation ceremonies.

=== All-New, All-Different Marvel ===
Beginning in January 2016, Brand is a supporting character in the ninth volume of Captain Marvel, written by Agent Carter showrunners Tara Butters and Michele Fazekas with artwork by Kris Anka, as part of the All-New, All-Different Marvel initiative. The series, set eight months after Secret Wars, features Brand as the Lieutenant Commander of the Alpha Flight Space Station. She works directly under Carol Danvers (Captain Marvel), who she is openly hostile towards.

In the aftermath of "Empyre", Brand attends the wedding reception of Hulkling and Wiccan. She also states that the Alpha Flight Space Program cannot function as a team if they are "caught in the loop." As Hulkling tries to break up the discussion, Brand announces her resignation from Alpha Flight. In a flashforward, Brand is seen leading her own team.

== Characteristics ==
=== Powers and abilities ===
==== Pyrokinesis ====
Brand possesses the power of pyrokinesis. She has exhibited the ability to coat at least her hands in flame that is potent enough to burn through most metals. This flame has been shown colored both blue and red, though it is unknown whether the colors have any specific significance. Although it was originally believed that this ability stems from her half-alien heritage, Brand revealed that her power is the result of her half-human heritage and is mutant in nature.

==== Multilingualism ====
Due to her tongue being able to make shapes that humans cannot, Abigail Brand is multilingual and is able to speak in several alien languages that others are unable to. For example, she was able to fluently communicate with Lockheed in his native tongue, which surprised her crew.

=== Physical appearance ===
Abigail Brand's green hair is a trait that has long been associated with S.H.I.E.L.D.'s enemy Hydra. Wolverine disparagingly refers to her as "Hydra-hair" at their first meeting. She reveals that this is her natural color, the unusual color inherited from her father's race. Abigail Brand has a tattoo on each bicep, respectively reading "Grace" and "Anna." The significance of these tattoos has yet to be revealed.

== Reception ==
=== Critical response ===
Deirdre Kaye of Scary Mommy called Abigail Brand a "role model" and a "truly heroic" female character. Francesco Cacciatore of Screen Rant called Abigail Brand Marvel's "Best Villain in Decades," while Stacie Rook included her in their "10 Female Marvel Heroes That Should Come To The MCU" list, and Alex Capriati included her in their "MCU: 10 Most Desired Fan Favorite Debuts Expected In The Multiverse Saga" list. Sarah Brown of Collider included Abigail Brand in their "30 Marvel Superheroes That Need to Join the MCU" list. Thayer Preece Parker of Comic Book Resources ranked Abigail Brand 8th in their "10 Greatest Marvel Villains Of 2022" list.

== Other versions ==
=== Ultimate Marvel ===
An alternate universe version of Abigail Brand from Earth-1610 appears in the Ultimate Marvel imprint. This version is a member of Nick Fury's Howling Commandos and a former member of Hydra.

=== Ultimate Universe ===
An alternate universe version of Abigail Brand from Earth-6160 appears in Ultimate Wolverine. This version is a member of the Opposition that opposes the Eurasian Republic. Brand takes part in a mission to free mutant prisoners from a facility in the Black Sea, only to be killed by the Angel Specimen.

== In other media ==
=== Television ===
- Abigail Brand appears in Iron Man: Armored Adventures, voiced by Cathy Weseluck. This version is an agent of S.H.I.E.L.D.
- Abigail Brand appears in The Avengers: Earth's Mightiest Heroes, voiced by Mary Elizabeth McGlynn. This version is an agent of S.W.O.R.D.

=== Video games ===
- Abigail Brand appears as a non-playable character in Marvel Avengers: Battle for Earth, voiced by Laura Bailey.
- Abigail Brand appears as a non-playable character in Marvel: Avengers Alliance Tactics.
- Abigail Brand appears in Marvel Heroes, voiced again by Mary Elizabeth McGlynn.
- Abigail Brand appears in Marvel Puzzle Quest.

=== Miscellaneous ===
- Abigail Brand appears in the motion comic Spider-Woman: Agent of S.W.O.R.D., voiced by Stephanie K. Thomas.
- Abigail Brand appears in the motion comic Astonishing X-Men, voiced by Rebecca Shoichet.
