= Astonishing X-Men =

Comic book series

- John Cassaday's cover to Astonishing X-Men #1

Publication information
- Publisher: Marvel Comics
- Format: (vol. 1–2); Limited series (vol. 3–4); Ongoing series
- Genre: Superhero
- Publication date: List: (vol. 1) March – June 1995 (vol. 2) September – November 1999 (vol. 3) July 2004 – December 2013 (vol. 4) September 2017 – November 2018 Infinity Comics December 2024 - October 2025
- No. of issues: List: (vol. 1): 4 (vol. 2): 3 (vol. 3): 68 (1 Annual & 1 Giant-Size) (vol. 4): 18 (including 1 Annual) Infinity:42
- Main character(s): Havok; Beast; Warpath; Dazzler; Colossus; Banshee

Creative team
- Written by: List: (vol. 1) Scott Lobdell (vol. 2) Howard Mackie (vol. 3) Joss Whedon Warren Ellis Daniel Way Christos Gage James Asmus Greg Pak Marjorie Liu (vol. 4) Charles Soule Matthew Rosenberg Infinity Alex Paknadel
- Penciller: List: (vol. 1) Joe Madureira (vol. 2) Brandon Peterson (vol. 3) John Cassaday Simone Bianchi Phil Jimenez Jason Pearson Juan Bobillo Sara Pichelli Nick Bradshaw Mike McKone Mike Perkins Gabriel Hernandez Walta Amilcar Pinna (vol. 4) Mike Deodato Infinity Phillip Sevy
- Inker: List: (vol. 1) Tim Townsend (vol. 2) Tim Townsend Dan Panosian (vol. 3) Andy Lanning Karl Story Marcelo Sosa
- Colorist: List: (vol. 1-2) Steve Buccellato (vol. 3) Laura Martin Simone Peruzzi Frank D'Armata Sonia Oback Chris Sotomayor Rachelle Rosenberg Jay Ramos Cris Peter (vol. 4) Frank Martin

Astonishing X-Men is the name of four X-Men comic book series from Marvel Comics, the first two of which were limited series. The third volume, an ongoing series, began in 2004, with its first run written by Joss Whedon and art by John Cassaday. It was then written by Warren Ellis with art by Simone Bianchi and Phil Jimenez. Daniel Way and Christos Gage then took over the title writing alternating stories. They were followed by James Asmus who wrote one issue, then Greg Pak, who took over for four issues in November 2011. Marjorie Liu wrote the final 21 issues of the series until its end at issue #68 in 2013.

The title's fourth volume and second ongoing series launched in 2017 during the "ResurrXion" storyline. The first run was written by Charles Soule and illustrated by a rotating cast of artists. Matthew Rosenberg and artist Greg Land would then take over the series before its end in 2018.

== Volume 1 (1995 limited series) ==
The original Astonishing X-Men was a four-issue limited series that replaced Uncanny X-Men during the 1995 alternate universe storyline "Age of Apocalypse", in which all X-titles were given new names and issue numbers. In the storyline, Professor X was murdered 20 years in the past by his own son, Legion. Magneto, witnessing his friend's death, committed himself to Xavier's dream and created his own team of X-Men. However, he was unable to prevent the rise of the despotic Apocalypse and hence the series primarily dealt with the X-Men's battle against him.

Astonishing X-Men, written by Scott Lobdell and illustrated by Joe Madureira, featured a team of X-Men led by Rogue and consisted of Sunfire, Blink, Morph, Sabretooth and Wildchild.

=== Roster ===
Issues	Years	Roster
1–4	1995	Rogue, Sunfire, Blink, Morph, Sabretooth, Wildchild

=== Collected editions ===
Title	Material Collected	Pages	Publication Date	ISBN
Astonishing X-Men (X-Men: The Age of Apocalypse Gold Deluxe Edition)	Astonishing X-Men (vol. 1) #1–4	96	August 1, 1995	0785101276
X-Men: The Complete Age of Apocalypse Epic Book 2	Astonishing X-Men (vol. 1) #1, X-Men: Alpha, Age of Apocalypse: The Chosen, Generation Next #1, X-Calibre #1, Gambit and the X-Ternals #1–2, Weapon X (vol. 1) #1–2, Amazing X-Men #1–2, Factor X #1–2, and X-Man #1	376	August 9, 2006	0785122648
X-Men: The Complete Age Of Apocalypse Epic Book 3	Astonishing X-Men (vol. 1) #2–4, X-Calibre #2–3, Generation Next #2–3, X-Man #2–3, Factor X #3, Amazing X-Men #3, Weapon X (vol. 1) #3, Gambit & the X-Ternals #3 and X-Universe #1	360	April 19, 2006	0785120513
X-Men: The Age Of Apocalypse Omnibus	Uncanny X-Men #320–321, X-Men (vol. 2) #40–41, Cable #20, X-Men Alpha, Amazing X-Men #1–4, Astonishing X-Men (vol. 1) #1–4, Factor X #1–4, Gambit And The X-Ternals #1–4, Generation Next #1–4, Weapon X Vol. 1 #1–4, X-Calibre #1–4, X-Man #1–4, X-Men Omega, Age of Apocalypse: The Chosen and X-Men Ashcan #2	1072	March 7, 2012	0785159827

== Volume 2 (1999 limited series) ==
The second limited series to bear the title Astonishing X-Men was published in 1999. Its three issues were written by Howard Mackie and illustrated by Brandon Peterson. The story occurs after the storyline The Shattering. Most of the regular X-Men left the team over a conflict with Professor X. An interim team consists of Cyclops, Phoenix, Wolverine, Archangel, Cable, and Nate Grey.

This team protected the Mannites (a group of super powered, genetically engineered children) from Death, a horseman of Apocalypse. Wolverine was apparently murdered by Death in the final pages of the series, but it was later revealed that "Death" was actually a mind controlled Wolverine, and that the "Wolverine" who was killed was an imposter, a shapeshifting Skrull.

=== Roster ===
Issues	Years	Roster
1–3	1999	Cyclops, Phoenix, Wolverine, Archangel, Cable, Nate Grey

=== Collected editions ===
Title	Material Collected	Pages	Publication Date	ISBN
Astonishing X-Men: Deathwish	X-Men #92, 95; Astonishing X-Men (vol. 2) #1–3; Uncanny X-Men #375	160	October 2, 2000	0785107541
X-Men: The Shattering	Uncanny X-Men #372–375; X-Men #92–95; Astonishing X-Men (vol. 2) #1–3	288	July 22, 2009	0785137335

== Volume 3 (2004–2013) ==
In 2004, Marvel used the title Astonishing X-Men for an ongoing X-Men series initially written by Joss Whedon and illustrated by John Cassaday. The series is noted for its independence from crossovers and large-scale events in the Marvel Universe such as House of M, Decimation, Civil War, Messiah Complex, Avengers Vs. X-Men, and Battle of the Atom. This was previously due to the long delays between issues and Whedon's own stated desire to remain away from big crossovers, which he personally disliked, and what he saw as hectic and unfollowable X-Men continuity. This policy persisted almost to the end of the series, with the sole exception being the "X-Termination" event in 2013.

=== Joss Whedon run (2004–2008) ===
Whedon/Cassaday's Astonishing X-Men is a continuation of Grant Morrison's New X-Men title and features a similar line-up of characters, including Cyclops and Emma Frost (as co-team leaders), Beast, Kitty Pryde/Shadowcat, Colossus, and Wolverine. This team became the usual focus for a majority of issues during Whedon's run. The run introduced a number of original characters into the Marvel Universe including Kavita Rao, Abigail Brand, S.W.O.R.D., Armor, Ord, and Blindfold. Whedon's run on the series was a critical and commercial success. The roster of the book was also the focus of various limited series at the time, such as X-Men: Phoenix—Endsong, X-Men: Phoenix—Warsong and World War Hulk: X-Men.

==== "Gifted" (issues #1–6) ====
The first story arc focused on the introduction of several key characters and their involvement on the team. Whedon introduced a "mutant cure" designed by Indian Benetech scientist Kavita Rao, who was secretly sponsored by warrior alien Ord. The prospect of "real" humanity arouses the interest of a heavily mutated Beast, who visits Rao only to discover that the drug is the product of illegal experimentation on an unknown victim(s). The X-Men raid Benetech and reunite with Colossus. With Colossus's help, the team takes down Ord, but not before it is revealed that a mutant (most likely an X-Man) would destroy Ord's home planet, Breakworld, within the next three years.

With this 2005 arc, Whedon brought back Colossus four years after his comic book death in 2001.

==== "Dangerous" (issues #7–12) ====
This arc features a Sentinel attack with a mystery mastermind. The culprit is the Danger Room itself, which has become sentient and fights the X-Men in a humanoid form called Danger. The Sentinel that destroyed Genosha becomes aware of its actions and ceases its attack on the X-Men. It is revealed that Professor X imprisoned Danger and made it an unwilling servant, leaving the X-Men disgusted. It is also revealed that Emma Frost is aligned with the Hellfire Club.

==== "Torn" (issues #13–18) ====
The X-Men are manipulated by a new Hellfire Club, consisting of Cassandra Nova, Emma Frost, Perfection, Negasonic Teenage Warhead, and Sebastian Shaw. It is revealed that when Nova's mind was imprisoned by Emma into a biological "slug", Nova placed a subtle suggestion into Emma's mind to cause Emma to believe she had to help Nova destroy the X-Men and free Nova, and that Cyclops' inability to control his optic blasts is result of a childhood trauma. Nova initially defeats the X-Men by manipulating their greatest fears. In the end, Nova's plot is revealed to Emma by Cyclops, but it is unknown whether Emma returned the consciousness of Nova to the slug or if it went elsewhere. Moments later, Ord and Danger burst into the room, and they are all forcibly teleported away by S.W.O.R.D. to a spaceship headed for the Breakworld.

The final panel of issue 15, in which Shadowcat crouches in a sewer clenching her fists, was an homage to the final panel of Uncanny X-Men #132, in which Wolverine did the same.

==== "Unstoppable" (issues #19–24 and Giant-Size Astonishing X-Men #1) ====
The final arc takes place on the alien Breakworld. The X-Men square off against the Breakworld leaders, who intend to destroy Earth by firing a giant bullet at it. The Danger subplot is also resolved, and it is revealed that Danger is hard-coded not to kill. Shadowcat phases inside the Breakworld bullet, and when it reaches Earth, makes it intangible, so that the bullet passes through Earth. However, she is unable to remove herself from the bullet and vanishes with it into space.

=== Warren Ellis run (2008–2011) ===
Marvel announced at San Diego Comicon 2007 that following completion of the Whedon/Cassaday run on Astonishing X-Men, the series would continue with the new creative team of Warren Ellis and Simone Bianchi. Ellis later confirmed this story on his website, saying the series would be retitled Astonishing X-Men: Second Stage. He also mentioned that, like Whedon, he would be given complete creative freedom without having to pay mind to the franchise's sprawling continuity.

This run was expected to debut in early 2008, but was pushed back to July 2008, with the "Second Stage" subtitle dropped. A sketchbook was released before the first issue and showed costume redesigns by Bianchi. The characters showcased were Dazzler, Beast, Nightcrawler, Archangel, Cyclops, Emma Frost, Colossus, Storm, and Wolverine. While some of the characters did not appear in the book, Ellis had mentioned earlier that a majority of Bianchi's drawings were made public to promote the title, and that upon his run's announcement the final cast had not been set.

Ellis and Bianchi's first issue, Astonishing X-Men #25, featured the team relocated to San Francisco, with a base in the Marin headlands. The story takes place in the aftermath of the House of M story arc, which put mutants on the verge of extinction. The initial "Ghost Box" arc was printed under the Manifest Destiny label, but did not feature any crossovers with other titles. The only addition to the team was Storm, with Colossus and Kitty Pryde having left the team.

==== "Ghost Box" (issues #25–30) ====
Now based in San Francisco, Ellis established the X-Men as protectors of the city. The new team consisted of Cyclops, Emma Frost, Beast, Wolverine and Armor, and later, Storm arrived. The X-Men uncovered a plot of mutant synthesis from an unusual murder. The killer (designated 'X') was located, fixing and restarting the eponymous "ghost box" in a spaceship. X was defeated but killed himself rather than surrender information about his intentions and "the Annex."

The team returned to San Francisco with Suspect X's "mysterious box" (actually a "Ghost Box") in tow and gave it to Hank along with a syringe filled with Suspect X's blood. After analyzing the box and blood and reviewing Suspect X's file, Hank told Scott that there appears to be talk about a secret war between Suspect X's people and the murdered mutant from the beginning of the story arc. There is also talk about a mysterious place called Tian, China, which piques the interest of Wolverine. After analyzing Suspect X's blood, Hank finds that Suspect X is a normal mutant but with his X-gene on a different chromosome. Just like the murder victim, Hank believes that Suspect X is a manufactured mutant. Hank wants to bring in Abigail Brand from S.W.O.R.D. to help investigate this matter, but Scott disagrees. In the end, against Scott's wishes, Brand is brought in and tells the X-Men that the Ghost Box is a dimensional portal between different realities. Hank concludes that Suspect X is not a manufactured mutant after all; in Suspect X's reality the x-gene is normally located on a different chromosome. Brand wants this case to fall under S.W.O.R.D.'s jurisdiction, but Scott objects. Brand gives Scott and the X-Men time to investigate before she brings in S.W.O.R.D.. The X-Men locate Tian, an uncharted area of China that no surveillance or satellite system can access, not even the Chinese government. The X-Men sneak into Tian and discover the headquarters of a secret group of mutants informally referred to by Hank as the "Chinese X-Men." Sadly, they seem to have died because of M-Day's associated effects.

As Storm and Emma investigate the grounded temple, Emma notices they are not alone and that she will have to switch to her diamond form, leaving her without her telepathy. She relays this to Cyclops, who is with Beast, Armor and Wolverine. As Armor and Wolverine search the temple for anyone else, Scott and Beast discuss Forge, M-Day and its effects on the multiverse. Armor and Wolverine come across a man who can fire lasers from his fingers, Storm and Emma lose their powers in the presence of the mutant hiding from them, and Cyclops and Beast take on a mutant with a strange chameleon mutation. After the X-Men take down their foes, they reveal to the X-Men they have a mutual friend, Forge. Emma continues to interrogate the X-Men's captives, and the team discovers that Forge created the manufactured mutants (including the victim in the beginning of the arc), for a counter-strike against the Annexation using a Ghost Box that he acquired.

The team head towards Forge's location and are apprehensive about the upcoming meeting. After some discussion with Forge, Cyclops and Storm try to reason with him but he is strongly determined to see his plan through. Forge's insistence seems to stem from years of being ignored and neglected and he desires to leave behind a legacy and save the world. Beast has Brand send an immensely powerful laser beam into the Ghost Box's portal. Storm urges Forge to escape, but he would rather face death than humiliation, and the team escapes as the beam destroys both the Ghost Box and the world from which the invaders came.

==== "Ghost Boxes" (Astonishing X-Men: Ghost Boxes #1–2) ====
During a four-month hiatus in the middle of Ghost Box's publication schedule, Ellis published Astonishing X-Men: Ghost Boxes. The two-issue spin-off series featured four short stories, with each revolving around Ghost Boxes. The first story, "Agent X-13's Report on the Emergency Annexation of Earth-616," is the only one of the four that does not take place in a parallel universe. Rather, it is an "alternate ending" to the Ghost Box arc where the Annexation of Earth-616 is successful.

The second story, "Being an Journal By Miss Emma Frost of New Portsmouth Bay in the State of New Albion," takes place on Earth-889, a steampunk parallel universe. In this story the X-Men, here known as X-Society, investigate parallel events similar to what happened on Earth-616 and inadvertently cause the Hindenburg disaster. The Emma Frost of this reality would later return in the "Exalted" storyline and be featured on the team in the X-Treme X-Men title.

The third story, "The Last Testament of Scott Summers," deals with a parallel Earth where the Annexation is successful and the X-Men are eliminated, save for Cyclops.

The final story, "4," focuses on a parallel Armor, Beast, and Wolverine five years after a catastrophic attack wiped out nearly all of the mutants and humanity. With barely any resources left, the three spend a year marching towards Kalispell, clinging onto the hope of a sanctuary where the resistance can make a final stand.

==== "Exogenetic" (issues #31–35) ====
Agent Brand's investigation of an orbiting laboratory in space ends with it self-destructing, damaging her escape ship. As the craft falls toward Earth, she radios the X-Men for help, and they save her before the craft can crash into San Francisco. In the crowd, Emma notices deceased former student Wallflower and follows after her. Wallflower immediately transforms into a bio-sentinel and the team destroy it. Brand reveals that an individual called Kaga hacked into the X-Men's files, using Beast's work on deriving a live x-gene from dead mutants to recreate some of the X-Men's greatest foes, such as the Brood, and bio-sentinels masquerading in cloned bodies of their former allies.

Brand's explanation is interrupted when a Brood-Krakoa hybrid attacks, attempting to destroy any physical evidence of the bio-sentinel. The X-Men destroy it and locate the hidden ship that dropped the hybrid, boarding it. They find another dead mutant, Paradigm, whom Kaga used to hack into the X-Men's files. Away from the team, Cyclops destroys the remnants of Paradigm, killing him, while the X-Men fight off and destroy a Brood-Sauron hybrid. The X-Men fly the ship into Kaga's base, finding an army of genetically engineered monstrosities meant to attack them. They destroy all the experimental creatures and confront Kaga.

Kaga is revealed to be a deformed elderly man with numerous genetic abnormalities and disorders, a mutant born from a mother who survived the atomic bombing of Hiroshima. He reveals that he hates the X-Men for their perfect bodies and incredible superhuman abilities despite being labeled "mutants," whereas he is deformed, trapped in a deteriorating body. In retaliation, Cyclops decides that he will not kill Kaga but will ensure that "Mutantes Sans Frontières" gives Kaga the care and medical attention he needs for the rest of his natural life.

==== "Xenogenesis" (Astonishing X-Men: Xenogenesis #1–5) ====
A miniseries that takes the X-Men to Africa to deal with a mysterious mutagen that is causing mutations amongst newborn children.

Storm leaves her home in Wakanda to visit the X-Men. They reunite and go to Africa to investigate a series of mutant births, which excites the hope of mutants replenishing their species. They find that the area set up for Mutantes Sans Frontieres has been overtaken by soldiers. The X-Men defeat the troops, and Emma Frost kisses the staff in order to let them download the native language for 48 hours so they may be able to communicate with the locals.

Beast witnesses the mutations and studies the babies, discovering they are not mutants but are simply affected by a type of radiation in the area. Before they can investigate, a cyborg arrives, claiming to be in charge of the area, and his armed troops take everyone hostage. Cyclops distracts the cyborg while Emma controls all of his troops, and they discover that they must work together in order to find out the cause of the radiation.

In the woods, they find a man running for his life. Wolverine, Beast, and two of the cyborg's best men track him into the jungle. A ghost box opens, and armed troops known as Furies emerge to kill the running man. Wolverine and Beast take them down, but the Ghost Box unleashes larger Furies that can morph their arms into weapons, and regenerate. Beast is shot, the cyborg's men are eviscerated, and Wolverine is almost killed when Cyclops and the others rescue them.

Emma scans the running man and discovers he is a multiverse teleporter. He escaped from his world, which was overrun by the Furies, who had killed every super-powered individual. The Furies were sent after him via the Ghost Box. Emma tells Cyclops that during their fight, they must keep one Fury alive or else everyone will die.

A single Fury is left for Emma, who nearly kills her. She takes control of its mind and performs a "psychic surgery", which alters its programming. Emma changes its orders to say it completed the mission and returned because it had no other commands. Without any reason to pursue further, the outside forces would leave Earth alone.

Emma also reveals to Cyclops that the man they have helped emits a burst of radiation when he teleports between universes, which is the cause of the babies' mutations. The cyborg kills the teleporter, saying he cannot have a volatile human dirty bomb walking around able to hurt everyone in the area. He says he doesn't like doing these kinds of things, but he has to, since it is his job.

=== Daniel Way and Christos Gage runs (2011) ===
During New York Comic Con, Marvel editors announced that following Warren Ellis' run, Daniel Way would take over writing duties for the series with Jason Pearson illustrating. Shortly after, it was announced that Christos Gage would also be writing for Astonishing X-Men, with Juan Bobillo as illustrator. Gage's arc would alternate with Way's over the course of seven issues. Way later revealed that this format was done due to illustrator Jason Pearson not being available on a monthly basis, and called the decision to alternate stories "brilliant." Though Pearson was the original artist for "Monstrous", he would only end up working on one-and-half issues, with artists Sara Pichelli and Nick Bradshaw doing the illustration for the rest of the arc.

Daniel Way's "Monstrous" arc would take a team of Cyclops, Emma Frost, Wolverine and Armor to Japan and Monster Island. Christos Gage's "Meanwhile" arc would feature an outer space rescue mission with Storm, Kitty Pryde, Colossus, Lockheed, Abigail Brand and Beast (who was with the Avengers during that time).

==== "Monstrous" and "Meanwhile" (issues #36–42) ====
During "Monstrous", Armor learns that her mother and brother have died in an accident in Japan. Cyclops, Emma Frost and Wolverine accompany her to Tokyo to attend their wakes. Meanwhile, Mentallo is dispatched by Roxxon Corporation to Monster Island, on which the corporation intends to drill for oil. However, Mentallo psychically enslaves the monsters on the island in order to extort cash from Roxxon, and sets one of the monsters to attack Tokyo. The monster is defeated by the team, including Armor, who had left the wake earlier to rejoin them.

Cyclops, Emma, Wolverine, and Armor then make their way to Monster Island. Wolverine and Emma are captured by Mentallo, who intends to bury them alive when the volcano erupts, but they are freed by Cyclops. The X-Men pursue Mentallo, and though he manages to escape, he is crushed alive when one of the giant monsters dropped a cargo container directly on top of him, which contained the entire billion dollars in cash.

Armor reunites with her father, who admits that he was upset when she left the wake, but after seeing her nobly set aside her grief to show great strength and protect the city, he tells her that he has never been prouder of her than that day. The two then say their goodbyes.

Abigail Brand leads a rescue mission to the Pandora's Box space station, where some of the universe's most dangerous experiments are conducted. Only one person has been retrieved from the station, but he leaves Brand for dead. As a result, Beast recruits Storm, Colossus, Kitty Pryde and Lockheed to rescue her. The team find Brand and members of S.W.O.R.D. still alive, but they have been infected by the Brood. The station's scientists had been trying to extract the larvae without killing the hosts.

The X-Men get back to the ship and have an opportunity to destroy the space station and eliminate the Brood for good. Brand argues against this, stating that in the galaxy's larger ecosystem, the Brood are necessary to take out the larger, more dangerous species. They decide to take out the Brood Queens (multiple being allowed to exist to allow species survival), to sever the mental connection between the species and allow the rest of the Brood to return home without any consequence.

While the X-Men attack the Brood, the team becomes infected and gradually mutate into the Brood themselves, the only exception being Kitty Pryde, still in her intangible state. The team find another unnamed Brood teenager, who became an outcast due to his compassion for mammals. Eventually, the X-Men are able to regain their human memories mid-battle and eliminate the Brood Queens. The Brood are given the option to go home, which they accept. The Brood teenager accompanies the X-Men to S.W.O.R.D.'s headquarters and observes the new Brood larvae extracted from the infected X-Men. He remarks that with no ties to the hive mind or the Brood Queen, the future Brood under the S.W.O.R.D.’s care have a bright future. Storm says that it is now up to him to look after the new Broodlings, and that if he were ever to come to Earth, he would have a place on the X-Men.

=== James Asmus one-off (2011) ===
A one-off story, issue #43 "Whispering Machines," was written by James Asmus, his only credit in the series. The issue served as a bridge between "Monstrous"/"Meanwhile" and the next story arc. It would feature the series' smallest team yet of Danger and Emma Frost, with an appearance from Beast (who was still with the Avengers). Asmus would describe "Whispering Machines" as a "buddy cop-type story," with "mismatched and yet perfectly paired partners for a specific mission."

==== "Whispering Machines" (Issue #43) ====
In "Whispering Machines", Danger returns to recruit Emma Frost to jailbreak Machinesmith out of the Avengers headquarters. However, Machinesmith had been manipulating her into trying to break him loose while trying to take over her body. Danger regains control and returns him to Beast and the Avengers, and Frost comforts her in saying that she is still young and still learning to trust others, but that is one thing that makes her human.

=== Greg Pak run (2011–2012) ===
Marvel would announce that Greg Pak and Mike McKone would be the next creative team to take over Astonishing X-Men. A teaser image was released of Cyclops and Storm kissing, fueling speculation that the run would feature a romantic arc between the two. On a Q&A on Marvel's website, Pak revealed that his story would take place in the aftermath of the Schism event, and that he would be writing a more emotional arc. Pak's story would later be continued and spun-off into the X-Treme X-Men title.

==== "Exalted" (issues #44–47) ====
In the "Exalted", the focus lies mostly on Scott Summers as a lead character. Through the use of a Ghost Box, a device which allows characters to enter into a parallel universe, an alternate reality in the X-Men continuity is explored. In the timeline featured here, the X-Men have waged war on Magneto to free the subjugated human race. In his dying breath, Magneto cracks the planet causing certain doom. Xavier, recast as Savior in this timeline, and other Marvel super-geniuses create a device to save their planet by harnessing the powers of mutants.

Savior scours the multiverse with a Ghost Box collecting various incarnations of X-Men, favoring Cyclops, and using them until they burn out. That is until his Storm finds "our" Cyclops. Scott wakes to find himself imprisoned in the device along with alternate versions of mutant teammates James Howlett, Emmeline Frost, Shadow(cat), and a young Kurt Wagner (Nightcrawler). They escape, learn the truth about Savior and his plans, and make the hard humanity-at-stake decisions of heroes.

Along the way it becomes apparent that a single Cyclops can provide immense power for the device, and that many of them have chosen to self-sacrifice to preserve Savior's world. When Scott refuses and destroys the device telling Savior to "Find another way!", Savior reveals that he indeed has a permanent solution that requires the sacrifice of an entire universe, and claiming that this Scott's aberrant behavior proves he is from a flawed universe that he will not feel guilty about consuming with the help of a modified Ghost Box.

This combined with Savior's willingness to sacrifice some of the humans from his own reality is enough for Storm to side with the former captives. Together (and with Scott's Storm and Emma brought in by young Kurt) this makeshift team of X-Men defeat Savior. As his Emma and Storm depart through a failing Ghost Box portal, Scott tells them that his decisions doomed that Earth and he should stay to help fix it. Howlett pushes him through saying he had been worried momentarily about Scott's non-self-sacrifice, but now was reassured, and that Scott wouldn't be the last person they save today.

The alternate universe Howlett, Kurt and others would later return in a new X-Treme X-Men series, also written by Pak.

=== Marjorie Liu run (2012–2013) ===
Writer Marjorie Liu and artist Mike Perkins took over the Astonishing X-Men creative team as of issue 48 in March 2012, writing until the series' cancellation in issue 68. Her time on the series marked a more grounded take on the team, focusing more on the relationships of each characters with human reactions and interaction. By the end of her run, Liu's written credits would amount to 21 regular issues and one annual issue, second only to Whedon for most entries written for the title.

Liu's run completely rebooted the series' setting and lineup, which had until this point featured Cyclops and Emma Frost leading the X-Men. Under Liu, the series shifted focus to Wolverine's side as the team returned to New York during the "Regenesis" storyline and following the "Avengers vs. X-Men" storyline. The primary X-Men lineup for the rest of the series consisted of Wolverine, Gambit, Warbird, Northstar, Cecilia Reyes, Iceman, and Karma.

==== "Northstar" (Issues #48–51) ====
In the issues illustrated by Mike Perkins, the story primarily focuses on Northstar and Karma. Northstar's arc revolved around his issues with his non-mutant boyfriend Kyle, as both are unsure they can come to a mutual understanding on Northstar's duties as an X-Man and whether Kyle can provide enough emotional support. Northstar proposes marriage to Kyle, but he is at first rebuffed.

The X-Men are soon attacked by the Marauders, though it is revealed that they were under mind-control and were not acting on their own volition. After the attack, Karma soon falls under the control from the same culprit, an unknown business woman. Karma later takes control of the other X-Men, as well as Kyle, who tries to kill himself in front of Northstar. They are each able to break free, but Karma then goes missing. As the team tends to their wounds, Kyle then accepts Northstar's marriage proposal.

==== "Weaponized" (Issues #52–56 & Astonishing X-Men Annual #1) ====
During the wedding reception, Wolverine wanders off and finds Karma, only to get attacked by an unseen force. It is then revealed who had been controlling Karma and the Marauders from the beginning - Susan Hatchi, a successful weapons developer who wished to test out new nanotechnology to physically control her victims. Born Da'o Coy Manh, she is Karma's illegitimate half-sister whose mother was killed by their father.

In a later confrontation with the X-Men, Hatchi uses her nanotechnology to seize control of the team and orders them to take over Madripoor or she will use her technology on New York and kill the population. She wants to not only demonstrate the effectiveness of her weapon but to draw out their father from hiding by publicly using Karma as bait. While she is able to locate her father in Madripoor, the X-Men are able to counteract the technology and defeat her. While the two sisters reach reconciliation, their father takes advantage of their engagement and shoots Hatchi. He is arrested by the police for her murder. After Hatchi's death, Karma inherits her company as the only eligible relative of age and effectively becomes a billionaire.

==== "Unmasked" and "X-Termination" (Issues #57–68) ====
Gabriel Hernandez Walta would take over the art duties from Mike Perkins for the remainder of the run, though Amilcar Pinna would draw the two penultimate issues. The final 12 issues would contain shorter arcs, along with the series' only crossover with other X-Men titles.

The initial two issues (issues #57 to #58) focus on Warbird, who travels to Egypt after seeing an artifact in a magazine that turns out to be made by a race the Shi'ar obliterated a thousand years ago.

For the next three issues (issues #59 to #61), the series tied into the "X-Termination" storyline, with the X-Treme X-Men and Age of Apocalypse ongoing titles. Though not officially part of the crossover, issue #59 served as a prelude to the storyline. Issue #60 served as Part 2 of the crossover while issue #61 was Part 5. The storyline focused on the Age of Apocalypse Nightcrawler's attempt to return home, which resulted in the release of three evil beings that destroy anyone they touch. Several casualties resulted, including the AoA's Nightcrawler, Sabretooth, Horror Show, and Fiend, as well as the X-Treme X-Men's Xavier, Kid Nightcrawler, and Hercules. Following the event, Astonishing X-Men would be the sole title of the three to continue publication.

The next arc in the series (issues #62 to #65) featured Iceman, who was corrupted by the Apocalypse seed during X-Termination and sent the world into an ice age.

The next two issues (issues #66 to #67) deal with an alien being that possesses the minds of many New Yorkers. Gambit and Wolverine track the alien down to Indiana, where they enlist the aid of a local human girl who helps discover its origins and intentions.

Astonishing X-Men ended with issue #68 in October 2013, wrapping up many loose ends of the run: Iceman coming to terms with the damage he has dealt, Northstar and Kyle ensuring their future together, and Warbird accepting her role on the X-Men and her home on Earth. Its status as a team book featuring Wolverine and his X-Men team was replaced by a new series by Jason Aaron titled Amazing X-Men in November 2013.

=== Roster ===
Issues	Years	Roster
1–3	2004	Cyclops, Emma Frost, Wolverine, Beast, Kitty Pryde
4–19	2004–2006	Cyclops, Emma Frost, Wolverine, Beast, Kitty Pryde, Colossus
20–24 (& Giant-Size #1)	2007–2008	Cyclops, Emma Frost, Wolverine, Beast, Kitty Pryde, Colossus, Armor, Lockheed, Abigail Brand, Danger
25–35 (& Xenogenesis #1-5)	2008–2011	Cyclops, Emma Frost, Wolverine, Beast, Storm, Armor
36, 37, 39, 41	2011	Cyclops, Emma Frost, Wolverine, Armor
38, 40, 42	2011	Storm, Kitty Pryde, Colossus, Beast, Lockheed, Abigail Brand
43	2011	Emma Frost, Danger
44–47	2011–2012	Cyclops, Emmeline Frost, James Howlett, Shadow, Kurt Waggoner
48–59 (& Annual #1)	2012–2013	Wolverine, Gambit, Iceman, Warbird, Cecilia Reyes, Karma, Northstar
60–61	2013	"X-Termination" event
62–65	2013	Wolverine, Gambit, Iceman, Warbird, Karma, Kitty Pryde
66–68	2013	Wolverine, Gambit, Iceman, Warbird, Cecilia Reyes, Karma, Northstar, Kitty Pryde, Storm, Jubilee

=== Reception ===
Whedon's run was a critical success. "Gifted" was given the accolade of Wizard's book of the year, while IGN called the arc "best X-Men run in a decade" and lauded Whedon for flawless character dynamics. Whedon said that while he knew "many people have done cure scenarios before me," he was not familiar with any of those earlier stories at the time he started working on the arc. The "mutant cure" plot of "Gifted" eventually became the basis of the X-Men: The Last Stand.

The third volume of the Astonishing X-Men comic book series has generally been well received with comic sales normally being very high. Whedon's run was nominated for several Eisner Awards. In 2006, the series won the Best Continuing Series and in 2005 and 2006, John Cassaday won Best Artist/Penciller/Inker or Penciller/Inker Team (tied with Frank Quitely for 2005).

However, Joss Whedon's run on Astonishing X-Men was subjected to criticism regarding the delays between the issues. Whedon's initial contract with Marvel Comics was for twelve issues for one year but the final issues were four months late. After a break of several months, the title resumed in February 2006 with the new story arc "Torn." With issue 13, the comic temporarily went from monthly to bimonthly to allow more time for Whedon and Cassaday to finish each issue and avoid further late releases. The book resumed a monthly schedule in September 2006 with issues 16 and 17, but was delayed once again for issue 18. Delays persisted for a variety of reasons, including Cassaday's last-minute assignment to pencil the fifth issue of Fallen Son: The Death of Captain America.

In Wizard #173, Whedon admitted to making mistakes in the second story arc, saying he was so fascinated with the idea of the "new intelligence" that he neglected the action and thus prevented the story from flowing well.

Marjorie Liu's run on Astonishing X-Men received media attention for featuring Marvel Comics' first gay wedding between Northstar and longterm partner Kyle in issue #51. According to Marvel Comics editor-in-chief Axel Alonso, the issue was created as a response to real world's legalization of same-sex marriage in New York. Liu was nominated for a GLAAD Media Award in 2013.

=== Collected editions ===
#	Title	Material Collected	Pages	Publication Date	ISBN
1	Gifted	Astonishing X-Men (vol. 3) #1–6	152	May 10, 2006	0785115315
2	Dangerous	Astonishing X-Men (vol. 3) #7–12	152	June 27, 2007	078511677X
3	Torn	Astonishing X-Men (vol. 3) #13–18	152	February 14, 2007	0785117598
4	Unstoppable	Astonishing X-Men (vol. 3) #19–24 & Giant-Size #1	200	July 2, 2008	0785122540
5	Ghost Box	Astonishing X-Men (vol. 3) #25–30 & Ghost Boxes #1–2	184	December 9, 2009	0-7851-2788-7
6	Exogenetic	Astonishing X-Men (vol. 3) #31–35	120	November 10, 2010	0-7851-3149-3
7	Monstrous	Astonishing X-Men (vol. 3) #36–37, 39, & 41	112	December 14, 2011	0-7851-5114-1
8	Children of the Brood	Astonishing X-Men (vol. 3) #38, 40, 42–43, Uncanny X-Men #162	112	February 22, 2012	0-7851-5787-5
9	Exalted	Astonishing X-Men (vol. 3) #44–47 & material from Ghost Boxes #1	112	May 9, 2012	0-7851-6177-5
10	Northstar	Astonishing X-Men (vol. 3) #48–51, material from Nation X #2 & reprinting Alpha Flight #106	136	September 5, 2012	0-7851-6179-1
11	Weaponized	Astonishing X-Men (vol. 3) #52–56, Annual #1	128	April 9, 2013	0-7851-6415-4
12	Unmasked	Astonishing X-Men (vol. 3) #57–59, 62–68	216	December 31, 2013	0-7851-6180-5
Astonishing X-Men: Xenogenesis		Astonishing X-Men: Xenogenesis #1–5	160	October 5, 2011	0-7851-4491-9
X-Men: X-Termination		Age of Apocalypse #13–14, X-Treme X-Men (vol. 2) #12–13, X-Termination #1–2, Astonishing X-Men (vol. 3) #60–61	184	August 20, 2013	0-7851-8443-0
Astonishing X-Men By Joss Whedon & John Cassaday, Ultimate Collection Book 1		Astonishing X-Men (vol. 3) #1–12	320	February 1, 2012	0-7851-6194-5
Astonishing X-Men By Joss Whedon & John Cassaday, Ultimate Collection Book 2		Astonishing X-Men (vol. 3) #13–24 & Giant-Size #1	344	March 7, 2012	0-7851-6195-3
Astonishing X-Men By Joss Whedon & John Cassaday Omnibus		Astonishing X-Men (vol. 3) #1–24 & Giant-Size #1	672	October 7, 2009	0-7851-3801-3
Astonishing X-Men Companion		X-Men Unlimited (2004) #2-14, Giant-Size X-Men (2005) #3-4, Mythos: X-Men (2006) #1, material from Free Comic Book Day 2006 (X-Men/Runaways).	366	April 29, 2020	9781302922856

=== What If ===
The 2009 series of What If? includes a special one-shot comic exploring two alternatives to events which have occurred in the Astonishing X-Men series. The first examines what would have happened if Ord had resurrected Jean Grey—who was thought a logical candidate for the character rumored to be returning from the dead—instead of Colossus. The second considers the ensuing consequences if the android Ultron had learned of the existence of the sentient Danger during his then-battle with the Runaways, leading him to become determined to make her his bride.

=== Motion comics ===
Marvel later produced motion comics based on Astonishing X-Men, releasing them on Hulu, iTunes, the PlayStation Store, and other video services. These animated episodes were then released on DVD through Shout! Factory. Marvel Knights Animation would continued animating Whedon and Cassaday's run, starting with the second storyline of the series X-Men: Dangerous.

The titles in the series include:

1. Astonishing X-Men: Gifted (2009)
2. Astonishing X-Men: Dangerous (April 2012)
3. Astonishing X-Men: Torn (August 2012)
4. Astonishing X-Men: Unstoppable (November 2012)

=== Prose novel ===
Marvel released a prose adaption of Astonishing X-Men: Gifted in September 2012, written and adapted by comics writer Peter David.

== Volume 4 (2017–2018) ==
As part of the ResurrXion event, Marvel teased the arrival of a new X-Men team, revealing two members at a time over the course of several days. Eventually, Marvel revealed that the team would be part of the new ongoing Astonishing X-Men series, written by Charles Soule and illustrated by a rotating art team. The series starts when a band of X-Men members find themselves reunited in London in order to face the threat of the Shadow King. The team includes Psylocke, Bishop, Angel, Gambit, Fantomex, Old Man Logan, Rogue, and Mystique (initially disguised as Beast)

=== Charles Soule run (2017–2018) ===
==== "Life of X" (issues #1–6) ====
The first story arc features the return of the Shadow King and his series of psychic attacks against various mutants. While in London, Psylocke was targeted by the Shadow King, but she was able to send psychic butterflies to seek help before being possessed by the entity. The Shadow King focused the totality of Psylocke's psychic power emerging as a psychic butterfly and attacking the minds of the people in London. Returning her distress call were Rogue and Old Man Logan, aboard the Blackbird above the North Atlantic; Bishop, doing research in the British Museum, Angel, flying over the Scotland; Gambit and Fantomex, in the middle of a heist in Paris; and Beast, arriving in late after the attack. Betsy told the team that her attacker was the Shadow King and he's attacking psychics in an effort to return from the astral plane. Betsy sent Rogue, Gambit, Fantomex, Beast and Old Man Logan into the astral plane while Bishop and Angel stayed guard to protect Psylocke and the others.

While in the astral plane, it is revealed that the Shadow King had lured the X-Men as a psychic game with the late Charles Xavier, whose mind he had kidnapped when he died. The Shadow King intends to use The X-Men as vessels to escape into the real world. Beast also reveals himself to be Mystique, who also wants to stop the Shadow King. Initially, the Shadow King is able to escape using the bodies of Old Man Logan and Gambit, who attack and also spread his psychic hold onto the citizens of London. Angel is forced to turn into Archangel to deal with his possessed teammates. As they fight, the British military are brought on board, and consider attacking both the X-Men and as well as the possessed citizens by dropping a bomb into the area.

Eventually, Xavier is able to defeat the Shadow King with Rogue, Fantomex, and Mystique, and returns the three to the real world in time to stop the British military from attacking its own citizens. Right before the X-Men begin their counter-attack, Fantomex takes off his mask and reveals himself to be Xavier, who now calls himself X.

==== "A Man Called X" (issues #7–12) ====
As the X-Men process Xavier's return as X, the bomb is dropped onto London, only to be stopped by Archangel. X then cleanses the minds of the possessed citizens of the Shadow King's hold. He explains to the team that Fantomex willingly sacrificed himself to the astral plane to allow X to return to the world of the living. However, in his escape from the astral plane, X also realizes that he also unintentionally freed Proteus.

Proteus takes control of a village in the Scottish Highlands, who intends to bring the astral plane to reality. He then warps all of the villagers with his powers and turns the village into a garden that fires reality seeds all over the world. X mentions the network of psychics the Shadow King was using and that Betsy who is in control should tap into it. She agrees and does so, yet unbeknownst to her, X was possessed by the Shadow King, who violently erupts from X's head.

Following X's apparent death after the Shadow King exploded from his skull, the psychic villain routinely defeats the X-Men until X literally pulls himself back together. He and Psylocke re-try harnessing the power of all of Earth's psychics to destroy the Shadow King. As Psylocke says she feels no psychic trace of him anywhere, X wipes the mind of the X-Men and restores Archangel back to Angel. Only Psylocke's memory is left intact, with X telling her she will be the one to “keep him honest” and watch over him in case the Shadow King returns. X then states that he has no desire to return to the school, as it was Charles Xavier's dream, and that as X he has a new dream.

=== Matthew Rosenberg run (2018) ===
Matthew Rosenberg and artist Greg Land would take over the series for the next five issues. Rather than rebooting the series again with a new #1 issue, Rosenberg requested that the issue count continued where Soule's run left off. Rosenberg's run would center around Havok, Beast, Warpath, Dazzler, Colossus and Banshee, who deal with the return of the Reavers.

Rosenberg would also write an annual issue, a one-off which focused on the surviving members of the original X-Men: Jean Grey, Beast, Archangel, Iceman, and X.

==== "Until Our Hearts Stop" (issues #13–17) ====
Havok and Beast are attacked by the Reavers as the former tries to recruit the latter into forming a new team of the X-Men. They are rescued by Banshee, who had been under Beast's care at Harvard, and Warpath, who had been dispatched to keep an eye on Havok. They then recruit Colossus and Dazzler, only to get attacked by a group they believe to be the Reavers. However, after defeating them in battle, realize that they were fighting government agents.

Havok and Warpath separate from the rest of the group, who are kidnapped by the Office of National Emergency (O.N.E.) While under capture, the X-Men realize that dangerous experiments are being conducted on mutants. Havok joins forces with the Reavers and manage to infiltrate O.N.E.'s base, but they are attacked by Sentinels. The Reavers then reveal that they can now integrate and absorb technology. After integrating with the Sentinels, the Reavers then turn on The X-Men but are defeated. Havok eventually surrenders himself to O.N.E. for the damage he has done, but forges a deal saying that he will take sole responsibility to clear his other teammates of federal charges, in return for not revealing to the world all of the experiments happening at O.N.E.'s headquarters. His teammates vow to free him.

==== Astonishing X-Men Annual #1 ====
In Astonishing X-Men Annual #1, a revived Jean Grey reunites with the surviving members of the original X-Men - Beast, Archangel, and Iceman - at the restaurant where Professor Xavier first took them to celebrate their first mission. Jean reflects on the sacrifices each have made and wonders if it was worth getting revived in the first place. They are soon joined by X, who surprises the members with his appearance and new form. X takes the four to a town whose residents are under the control of Lucifer. Lucifer is eventually killed by Archangel, which consequently kills the entire townspeople.

Jean, Beast, Archangel and Iceman are horrified by the mission's outcome, but X explains that this is why they became X-Men in the first place: to save the world or watch its inhabitants perish. He only wishes the X-Men can find mere bits of happiness in their lives, and then wipes their memories of the incident. The next day, the four have their reunion again, but it is a more joyous occasion than the day before.

=== Roster ===
Issues	Years	Roster
1–6	2017	Psylocke, Bishop, Angel, Gambit, Fantomex, Old Man Logan, Rogue, Mystique
7–12	2018	Psylocke, Bishop, Archangel, Gambit, Old Man Logan, Rogue, Mystique, X
13–17	2018	Havok, Beast, Warpath, Dazzler, Colossus, Banshee
Annual #1	2018	Jean Grey, Beast, Archangel, Iceman, X

=== Collected editions ===
#	Title	Material Collected	Pages	Publication Date	ISBN
1	Life of X	Astonishing X-Men (vol. 4) #1–6	144	March 6, 2018	978-1302908508
2	A Man Called X	Astonishing X-Men (vol. 4) #7–12	136	August 14, 2018	978-1302908515
3	Until Our Hearts Stop	Astonishing X-Men (vol. 4) #13–17 & Annual #1	160	January 22, 2019	978-1302912963

== Infinity Comics ==
Marvel Unlimited released Astonishing X-Men Infinity Comics, a 42-issue series that ran from December 2024 to September 2025. The series was created by writer Alex Paknadel and artist Phillip Sevy, and featured the characters Banshee, Husk, and Skin.

== In other media ==
=== Film ===
- The "Gifted" story arc from Whedon and Cassady's run was partially adapted in the 20th Century Fox film X-Men: The Last Stand (2006), part of the X-Men film series. In the film, Warren Worthington II discovers that his son Warren Worthington III is a mutant. Worthington has his company produce a "cure" derived from the mutant Jimmy, who can nullify superpowers, to suppress the X-gene. Certain mutants such as Rogue are tempted to take it due to the destructive nature of their abilities, while others like Magneto organize to revolt against its development, fearing for its potential to be weaponized against all mutants. During a raid on a mobile prison by the Brotherhood of Mutants to free and recruit Juggernaut, Mystique is hit by a dart with the cure intended for Magneto and loses her powers, leading Magneto to abandon her. Magneto and the Brotherhood later intend to attack Alcatraz to track and kill Jimmy. The X-Men engage with the Brotherhood in a final battle, during which Wolverine distracts Magneto as Beast injects him with the cure, suppressing his magnetism abilities. In the aftermath, peaceful mutant and human co-existence is achieved, with Beast being appointed as a community ambassador to the United Nations. Rogue, having taken the cure, is able to become more intimate in her relationship with Iceman.
- Wolverine's appearance in the Marvel Cinematic Universe (MCU) film Deadpool & Wolverine (2024) is modeled after his yellow and blue suit featured in the Whedon / Cassady run on Astonishing X-Men, albeit with sleeves covering the character's biceps.

=== Animation ===
- The team lineup and character designs of the X-Men roster in the animated series Wolverine and the X-Men draw inspiration from the Astonishing X-Men comics.
- Astonishing X-Men is a Marvel animated comic adaptation that ran for four seasons from 2009 to 2013, each consisting of seven episodes. The series is structured in short "chapters" of roughly 10–12 minutes. On DVD, episodes are grouped into story arcs with titles such as Gifted, Dangerous, and Torn.
- The "Dangerous" storyline is adapted in the X-Men '97 episode "Danger.exe".

=== Miscellaneous ===
GraphicAudio released an audio adaptation scripted by Peter David in 2014.
