= Ord (comics) =

- Ord as depicted in Astonishing X-Men (vol. 3) #2 (June 2004). Art by John Cassaday.

Publication information
- Publisher: Marvel Comics
- First appearance: Astonishing X-Men (vol. 3) #1 (May 2004)
- Created by: Joss Whedon; John Cassaday

In-story information
- Alter ego: Ord
- Notable aliases: Ord of the Breakworld
- Abilities: Superhuman strength, speed, and endurance Enhanced durability Enhanced hearing Flight; Master martial artist Highly skilled in use of bladed weapons

Ord is a supervillain appearing in American comic books published by Marvel Comics. The character has been depicted specifically as an enemy of the X-Men. He first appeared in Astonishing X-Men #1 in May 2004. He was created by writer Joss Whedon and artist John Cassaday.

== Fictional character biography ==
=== Ord's mission ===
Ord is an alien originating from the planet Breakworld who is sent to Earth by Kruun, the ruler of Breakworld, to stop a mutant from Earth from destroying their planet. To this end, Ord obtains the body of Colossus and resurrects him using Breakworld technology. Ord experiments on Colossus with the assistance of human scientist Kavita Rao, developing a cure to remove the powers of mutants in the hope that saving Breakworld. Ord is allowed to operate by Abigail Brand, the head of S.W.O.R.D., who is attempting to avert a potential war between Earth and Breakworld.

=== Encounters with the X-Men ===
During their first encounter, Ord nearly defeats the X-Men, but is caught off guard by Lockheed, who disfigures his face with a fire blast. Ord is nearly killed by Colossus, but is prevented from doing so by Abigail Brand and Nick Fury and taken into the custody of S.W.O.R.D.

Ord escapes from the Peak, a space station in orbit around Earth, with the assistance of Danger. The two are recaptured by S.W.O.R.D, along with the X-Men, and taken aboard a starship headed for Breakworld. Ord contacts his homeworld to alert them that Colossus is also aboard, an event deliberately engineered by Brand to draw Breakworld's forces away from Earth. When the Breakworlders capture the S.W.O.R.D. starship, Ord is taken prisoner and charged with the failure of his mission, a crime punishable by death.

Aghanne, a Breakworlder prophet, attempts to use Colossus to rip off the energy core of Breakworld and destroy the planet, believing that living under the tyrannical rule of Kruun is a fate worse than death. Ord sacrifices himself to help Colossus save Breakworld and is burnt up in the core.

== Powers and abilities ==
Ord possesses strength much greater than that of a human and is also capable of flight. It is unclear whether these attributes are shared by all members of his race, or if they are the product of alien technology.
