= Danger Room =

Training facility in X-Men comics

- Marvel Comics location
- First appearance: The X-Men #1 (November 1963)
- Created by: Stan Lee, Jack Kirby

In-universe information
- Type: Training room
- Location: X-Mansion
- Character: X-Men
- Publisher: Marvel Comics

The Danger Room is a fictional training facility appearing in American comic books published by Marvel Comics. It first appeared in The X-Men #1 (September 1963), and was created by Stan Lee and Jack Kirby. The facility is depicted as built for the X-Men as part of the various incarnations of the X-Mansion. Its primary purpose is to train the X-Men, initially using traps, projectile firing devices, flamethrowers, and mechanical dangers such as presses and collapsing walls. These are replaced by holographics when the Danger Room is rebuilt using Shi'ar technology. It gained sentience in Astonishing X-Men as Danger.

== Publication history ==
An obstacle course in which the X-Men train appears in The X-Men #1 (September 1963), but the Danger Room is never mentioned by name. The name "Danger Room" is first used in The X-Men #2 (November 1963). According to X-Men writer/editor/co-creator Stan Lee, "the Danger Room was Jack Kirby's idea. I thought it was great because we could always open with an action sequence if we needed to."

== Early designs ==
Panel from The X-Men #1 (September 1963) showing Beast training. Art by Jack Kirby.

In early stories, the Danger Room is filled with traps, projectile firing devices, flamethrowers, and mechanical dangers such as presses, collapsing walls and the like intended to challenge the trainee. An observer remains in the overhanging control booth, managing the room's mechanisms to oversee the exercise while ensuring the subject's safety. The Danger Room is later upgraded with machines and robots for the X-Men to fight against. After befriending the Shi'ar, the X-Men rebuilt the Danger Room with Shi'ar hard-light holographic technology.

== Sentience ==
Danger
- Danger

Publication information
- Publisher: Marvel Comics
- First appearance: Astonishing X-Men vol. 3 #8 (February 2005)
- Created by: Joss Whedon; John Cassaday

In-story information
- Alter ego: Inapplicable
- Team affiliations: X-Men; X-Club; X-Factor
- Partnerships: Ord; Rogue; Gambit
- Abilities: Enhanced strength and durability Flight; Energy blasts Detailed knowledge of the X-Men; Technoformic control over herself and other machines Ability to create realistic holographic projections Energy projection and manipulation

In Joss Whedon's Astonishing X-Men, the Danger Room developed self-awareness. The first thing it does is convince Wing, who has recently lost his powers to Ord's cure, to kill himself. Next, the Danger Room takes control of a Sentinel and knocks out every psychic in the X-Mansion. During the Sentinel's attack, Cyclops orders Shadowcat and the students to hide in the Danger Room, where they find Wing's corpse. After being freed from its prison, the Danger Room takes a humanoid form called Danger and attacks the X-Men. Danger travels to Genosha to kill Professor X who knew of the Danger Room's sentience and chose to keep it secret. With the Danger Room gone, Prodigy builds a similar facility called the Danger Cave.

=== Revenge ===
When the S.W.O.R.D. headquarters is destroyed, Danger escapes to Australia, posing as an anthropologist at Melbourne University. She approaches Rogue in her disguise, but is targeted by a low-flying Shi'ar salvage spacecraft. After being damaged by the crew, she warps the entire area with her holographic projections of past moments within Rogue's life as well as other famous moments from the X-Men's history. Xavier confronts Danger and she reveals she intended to make Rogue absorb all Xavier's powers and memories permanently, leaving the Professor crippled and useless. Xavier reveals that when she first gained sentience, Xavier consulted her creators who assured him it was not possible she could have gained self-awareness and that Xavier had no way of knowing what she was or would become. Xavier tried to free Danger, but did not know how to do so without crippling her. After Xavier repairs her, Danger sides with Xavier, Rogue, and Gambit and takes out the Shi'ar salvage crew.

=== Utopia ===
Danger is offered the position of warden of Utopia by Emma Frost, which she accepts because it also allows her to study the best and the worst of what humanity has to offer.

=== All-New X-Factor ===
Danger reappears in the All-New X-Factor series. She appears as a prisoner of a member of the Thieves Guild, which Gambit is running; when Gambit discovers this, he orders her to be freed. After restoring her memory, which was lost due to the imprisonment, Gambit invites Danger to join the new X-Factor team.

=== Krakoa ===
When Krakoa becomes a sovereign nation for mutants, Madison Jeffries attempts to bring Danger with him. However, the island rejects the home he had build for her. Jeffries is put into the Pit of Exile for breaking Krakoa's laws, while Danger is forced to leave Krakoa.

== Powers and abilities ==
As she gained self-awareness and adopted a more humanoid appearance, Danger has shown enhanced strength and durability, the abilities to create hard-light holographic projections that can affect entire areas, emit modulated energy waves for blasts, binding and protection, flight capability, mechanical regeneration and shapeshifting; with which to alternate her physical form as well as rebuild herself after her body is destroyed, control and assimilate machinery and cybernetic components into herself via thought. She is able to bring other machines into self-awareness and upload her consciousness into foreign digitized or mechanical systems to build, operate or otherwise commandeer new bodies.

== Reception ==
The Danger Room is well known and viewed as an iconic part of the X-Men mythos.

== In other media ==
=== Television ===
- The Danger Room appears in Spider-Man and His Amazing Friends.
- The Danger Room appears in X-Men: Pryde of the X-Men.
- The Danger Room appears in X-Men: The Animated Series, voiced by Catherine Disher.
  - The Danger Room appears in X-Men '97, with its AI voiced by Jennifer Hale, and Danger voiced by Rachel Kimsey.
- The Danger Room appears in the Spider-Man: The Animated Series episode "The Mutant Agenda".
- The Danger Room appears in X-Men: Evolution.
- The Danger Room appears in Wolverine and the X-Men, voiced by Danielle Judovits.

=== Film ===
Concept art of the Danger Room as featured in X2 (2003)

The Danger Room appears in the X-Men film series.

- The Danger Room was meant to appear in X-Men (2000) and was alluded to in X2 (2003), but was deleted in the former film and scrapped in the latter film due to budget concerns.
- The Danger Room appears in X-Men: The Last Stand (2006).
- The Danger Room appears in X-Men: Apocalypse (2016).

=== Video games ===
- The Danger Room appears as a stage in X-Men (1993).
- The Danger Room appears in X-Men: Mutant Apocalypse.
- The Danger Room appears as Cyclops's home stage in X-Men: Children of the Atom.
- The Danger Room appears Paradox Entertainment's X-Men fighting game trilogy. It was originally as Cyclops's home stage in X-Men: Mutant Academy, before being designated as a home stage for Beast and Professor X in X-Men: Mutant Academy 2. The Danger Room also appears as a stage in X-Men: Next Dimension.
- The Danger Room appears in X-Men Legends and X-Men Legends II: Rise of Apocalypse, voiced by Zachary Quarles.
- The Danger Room appears in Marvel vs. Capcom 3: Fate of Two Worlds and its remake Ultimate Marvel vs. Capcom 3.
- The Danger Room appears in Marvel Heroes while Danger appears as a non-playable character.
- The Danger Room appears as a playable game mode in Marvel: Future Fight.
- The Danger Room appears as a playable game mode in Marvel Strike Force.
- The Danger Room appears in Marvel Ultimate Alliance 3: The Black Order, voiced by Laura Bailey.
- Danger appears as a playable character in Marvel Tokon: Fighting Souls, voiced by Judy Alice Lee in English and Eri Yasui in Japanese.

=== Miscellaneous ===
- The Danger Room is featured as a wizard mode in Stern's X-Men Pinball machines.
- The Danger Room appears as part of a replica of the Xavier Institute created by Airbnb.
- The Danger Room appears as part of the Lego Xavier Institute, released in 2024.
