= Colossus (character) =

Marvel Comics character

- Textless variant cover of Avengers vs. X-Men: Consequences #3 (October 2012). Art by Adi Granov.

Publication information
- Publisher: Marvel Comics
- First appearance: Giant-Size X-Men #1 (May 1975)
- Created by: Len Wein; Dave Cockrum

In-story information
- Alter ego: Piotr Nikolayevich "Peter" Rasputin
- Species: Human mutant
- Place of origin: Ust-Ordynsky Collective near Lake Baikal, Russia
- Team affiliations: X-Men; Defenders; Excalibur; Acolytes; Phoenix Five; X-Force; Quiet Council of Krakoa
- Notable aliases: Rasputin; The Proletarian; Peter Nicholas; Juggernaut
- Abilities: Metal mimicry; Superhuman strength, stamina, and durability

Colossus (Piotr Nikolayevich "Peter" Rasputin; Russian: Пётр Николаевич Распутин) is a character appearing in American comic books published by Marvel Comics. Created by writer Len Wein and artist Dave Cockrum, he first appeared in Giant-Size X-Men #1 (May 1975).

A Russian mutant, he is a member of the X-Men. Colossus is able to transform himself into a metallic form, making him the physically strongest of the team. He is portrayed as quiet, honest, and virtuous. He has had a fairly consistent presence in X-Men-related comic books since his debut. A talented artist, he only reluctantly agrees to use his powers in combat, feeling it is his responsibility to use his abilities for the betterment of human- and mutant-kind.

In film, Donald MacKinnon made a cameo appearance as Colossus in X-Men (2000) before Daniel Cudmore took over for X2 (2003), X-Men: The Last Stand (2006), and X-Men: Days of Future Past (2014), while Stefan Kapičić voiced a separate iteration of Colossus in Deadpool (2016), Deadpool 2 (2018), and the Marvel Cinematic Universe film Deadpool & Wolverine (2024).

== Concept and creation ==
Editor Roy Thomas, in charge of reviving the X-Men for Giant-Size X-Men #1 (May 1975), told the creative team to go home and create some characters for the new team. Dave Cockrum recalled:

I just went home and Colossus was one of the first ones that came to mind. We needed a strong guy for the team, so I drew up a strong guy. The character's armor just kind of fell into place. He was accepted pretty much as-is, except that I had given him bare legs because it seemed only logical that if we're going to show him armored up, the legs should be bare like the arms. But Len Wein didn't like male characters with bare legs. So we decided that his costume would be blue when he wasn't armored up, and that we'd see his legs when he was armored up, due to the unstable molecules of his costume.

Cockrum detailed more of the character's conception, "Colossus was loosely based on a character I had come up with in college, named 'Mr. Steel'"... As for why the character was chosen to be Russian... "Well, it seemed like a good idea at the time. Everybody was into détente and it was supposed to be an international group and the way I drew it, he looked like a Russian, so why the hell not? That was really all there was to it."... "Len Wein chose Peter's name. I imagine he used Rasputin because...it's a recognizable Russian name."

== Publication history ==
A mainstay of the X-Men comic book series until the 1990s, Colossus went on to appear regularly in the first series of Excalibur. While a member of the team, he had his own self-titled one-shot that depicted him and his teammate Meggan battling Arcade at his new Murderworld facility.

After returning to the X-Men alongside Excalibur teammates Shadowcat and Nightcrawler, Colossus stayed with the title until his death. He was later resurrected and was a regular in the third series of Astonishing X-Men written by Joss Whedon. He is the feature of a limited series, Colossus: Bloodlines, in which he journeys back to Russia. Colossus has since returned as a regular in the X-Men series, appearing in various titles such as X-Men: Manifest Destiny, X-Men: Secret Invasion, X-Men, and Astonishing X-Men.

Colossus appears in Cable and X-Force, a new series by writer Dennis Hopeless and artist Salvador Larroca which debuted in Dec. 2012. He appears in Extraordinary X-Men, written by Jeff Lemire and drawn by Humberto Ramos. He is part of a team which is led by Storm, and includes his little sister Magik, Iceman, a teenaged version of Jean Grey, Nightcrawler, a re-purposed Sentinel named Cerebra, and Old Man Logan.

In 2025, Colossus will be getting a solo X-Men project.

== Fictional character biography ==
=== Background ===
Colossus' first appearance from Giant-Size X-Men #1 (May 1975); art by Dave Cockrum

Piotr "Peter" Rasputin was born on a Soviet collective farm called the Ust-Ordynsky Collective near Lake Baikal in Siberia. He lived there with his mother Alexandra, father Nikolai, and sister Illyana. His older brother Mikhail had been a Soviet cosmonaut and had apparently died in a rocket accident. The 2006 comic mini-series Colossus: Bloodline established that the family was descended from Grigori Rasputin and a Romani woman named Elena.

Peter's superhuman powers manifested during his adolescence while saving his sister from a runaway tractor. He was then contacted by Professor Charles Xavier, founder of the X-Men.

=== X-Men ===
Peter Rasputin was part of the second generation of X-Men, formed by Charles Xavier to save the original X-Men from the living island Krakoa. He agreed to leave the farm community where he was born to go to the United States with Xavier. Xavier gave him the name Colossus. After the battle was won, Colossus remained in the U.S. with the new X-Men.

Colossus in his non-metallic form. From Astonishing X-Men vol. 3 #19 (Feb. 2007); art by John Cassaday

Colossus is typically portrayed as peaceful, selfless, reluctant to hurt or kill, and often putting himself in danger to protect others. In some of his earliest missions, he battled the Shi'ar Imperial Guard, and visited the Savage Land, where he met Nereel.

Peter's family always remained in his thoughts and he frequently wrote letters home. Shortly after joining the X-Men, a woman known as Miss Locke kidnapped many of the team's loved ones to force the X-Men to help her free her employer, Arcade, from captivity by one of Doctor Doom's robots. Among her captives was Colossus' younger sister Illyana, whom Locke had kidnapped from the Siberian collective farm and transported to the United States. Arcade brainwashed Colossus into becoming "The Proletarian", who then battled the other X-Men until they countered the brainwashing. The X-Men freed Illyana from captivity, and she went to live with her brother Peter at Xavier's mansion. She was later held captive in a dimension known as Limbo, where she spent years while only mere moments elapsed on Earth, and became the adolescent sorceress Magik. As a result, an alternate-timeline version of Colossus dies in Limbo.

When the X-Men fought the evil mutant Proteus, Colossus attempted to kill Proteus, an act he found morally questionable even though he did it to save Moira MacTaggert's life. During his early career with the X-Men, Peter began a relationship with fellow X-Man Kitty Pryde. (Note: Colossus and Kitty Pryde met in The Uncanny X-Men #129.) Although they were only a couple for a short while, the relationship provided the foundation of a deep and lasting friendship.

Colossus was later almost killed in a battle with Mystique's Brotherhood of Mutants, but was saved by Rogue and the Morlock Healer.

During the "Secret Wars", he became infatuated with the alien healer Zsaji, and realized his feelings for his teammate were not wholly genuine, ending his relationship with Kitty Pryde. Emotionally distraught, he afterwards engaged in a bar fight with Juggernaut.

During the "Mutant Massacre", Colossus became heavily involved in the X-Men's efforts to save the Morlocks from the Marauders. When Kitty was severely injured by Harpoon, Peter gave in to his rage and snapped Riptide's neck. He eventually passed out from previous wounds inflicted by Riptide. Magneto, with the aid of Shadowcat, used his powers to heal Peter's armored form, but the process left him paralyzed. He was sent to Muir Island to recuperate, along with Nightcrawler, Shadowcat, and the surviving Morlocks.

Over time, Colossus' wounds healed, but he was trapped in his armored form and could maintain his human form only with the utmost concentration. When he saw the X-Men in Dallas during the Fall of the Mutants, he had his sister teleport him to the battle, as Destiny had not seen him in her vision of the X-Men's demise. When the team decided to sacrifice themselves to stop the Adversary, Colossus gave his life alongside them to save the world. Like the rest of the X-Men, he was revived by Roma and decided to let the world believe him dead while he and the X-Men worked out of an Australian base.

Following the "Inferno" event, Illyana was returned to her original Earth age. Colossus decided it would be better for Illyana if she went back to live with their parents in Russia.

In time, Colossus was reunited with Nereel in the Savage Land and met her son.

After the X-Men began falling apart with Rogue vanishing, Wolverine taking off, Longshot quitting, and Storm apparently killed, Psylocke telepathically prodded the remaining three to disband and travel through the Siege Perilous to gain new lives. Peter emerged in New York with no memory of his past life, inventing a new persona for himself as 'Peter Nicholas', where he quickly became a successful artist. He battled the Genoshan Magistrates. He began having visions of a beautiful model, who turned out to be Callisto transformed by Masque. The two were kidnapped by the Morlocks, though Peter had no memory of his time with the X-Men. He resumed his armored form and defeated Masque. He was saved by Forge, Banshee, and Jean Grey, who decided it better that he live his new life rather than be dragged back into theirs.

Peter was psychically dominated by the Shadow King and sent to hunt down Stevie Hunter and Charles Xavier. Xavier had no choice but to destroy the Peter Nicholas persona to break the Shadow King's hold. Colossus joined in the battle of Muir Island, and rejoined the X-Men as a member of Storm's Gold Strike Force. Peter is shown to be traveling to the Savage Land, where he locates Nereel. He is astonished to learn that the child she bore was not his, but that of another lover. Disheartened, he departs the Savage Land.

The X-Men later found themselves in another dimension, where they discovered that Colossus' brother Mikhail was alive and acting as a messiah to the population of that world. Mikhail returned to Earth with the X-Men, but was distraught with having been responsible for the deaths of the original crew from his first trek into the other dimension.

Mikhail established himself as leader of the Morlocks and planned to use them as a part of his mass suicide which he thought would grant him retribution or at least reprieve from his guilt. This would prove to be a great source of grief for Peter in an upcoming string of family deaths that would lead to him temporarily disbanding from the X-Men.

However, unbeknownst to the X-Men, Mikhail survived. In a seemingly last second change of mind, Mikhail transported himself and the Morlocks to another world. Later, upon learning this, Peter was disappointed by his brother's departure and blamed himself.

Back in Siberia, Peter's parents were slain and Illyana kidnapped by the Russian government, who hoped to genetically evolve Illyana to the point where she would have the use of her powers again, to defeat the mutant known as the Soul Skinner. Colossus, with the help of the X-Men, saved Illyana and brought her back to the Mansion.

Later, Illyana became an early victim of the Legacy Virus and died from it. The loss of his immediate family, as well as brain damage that forced him to remain in armored form, caused Colossus to rethink his position with the X-Men and join Magneto and his Acolytes, who had offered him an alternative to the X-Men's pacifist philosophy of peaceful mutant/human coexistence. Colossus recovered from the brain damage soon after, but decided to remain with the Acolytes of his own volition, hoping he could temper their extremist methods with what he had learned from Professor Xavier.

=== Excalibur ===
His stay with Magneto was not long once he realized that Avalon was not the place for him, either, particularly after Magneto was left brain-dead and the space station was destroyed by Holocaust. He left in search of the only person he felt truly cared for him, his former love and teammate Shadowcat, now a member of Excalibur. Colossus traveled to England, where he found Kitty in the arms of her new love, Pete Wisdom. Colossus, exhausted, mentally ill, and enraged, attacked Wisdom and, although the battle was short, Piotr nearly killed him. Colossus was subdued by Captain Britain and Meggan, later cured of his illness by Moira MacTaggert.

Colossus accepted Shadowcat's new life and chose to become a member of Excalibur. Although Colossus and the rest of the team eventually accepted Kitty Pryde's relationship with Wisdom, her pet dragon, Lockheed, did not and frequently attempted to reunite her with Peter Rasputin, whom he favored. One notable instance occurred at the wedding of Meggan and Captain Britain, when Lockheed seized the garter and dropped it into Colossus's hand, obliging him to place it on Kitty's leg after she had caught the bridal bouquet.. With Excalibur, he participated in many adventures, including helping to save London from an ancient demon. Excalibur eventually disbanded, after which Colossus returned to the X-Men alongside Nightcrawler and Shadowcat. Upon their return, the trio confronted a group of impostors led by Cerebro, which was masquerading as Professor X. During this time, he repaired his friendships with Wolverine and Storm, that were broken when he had joined the Acolytes. He formed a deep friendship with Marrow. Peter again found his long thought-dead brother Mikhail, but unfortunately lost him again when Apocalypse collected The Twelve in his quest for power.

=== Death ===
Using thoughts and notes from the recently murdered Moira MacTaggert, the X-Men's resident scientist, Beast, claimed to have found the cure for the Legacy Virus. Unfortunately, it could only be made airborne with the death of its first user. Rather than wait for a safer version and allow others to die as Illyana had, Colossus injected himself with the cure. By using his powers and sacrificing himself, Colossus enabled the release of an airborne cure, effectively eradicating the disease. His body was cremated and Shadowcat took his ashes back to Russia to be scattered on his native soil.

=== Return ===
Nearly two years later, it was brought to the attention of the X-Men that a medical company, entitled Benetech, had developed a mutant cure. After gaining a sample of the cure, Beast discovered a string of DNA hidden deep within the recesses of the formula. After matching the DNA, Beast and the other X-Men set out to investigate the truth behind Benetech.

During their infiltration, they discovered that Ord was responsible for the means with which the company was able to develop the cure. While the team was separated, Kitty descended into a hidden complex beneath the Benetech building and was able to unlock the true secret behind the cure: shortly after Peter's self-sacrificing death, Ord had captured his body and left a duplicate that the X-Men had cremated.

After reviving him, Ord had used the Legacy Virus cure in Peter's bloodstream to develop his mutant cure. After unknowingly releasing Peter from his cell, Kitty rejoined him with the X-Men. Together they subdued Ord as he tried to escape Earth. Since reuniting with his friends, Peter has returned to fight with the X-Men, and he and Kitty were able to resume their romantic relationship.

=== Colossus: Bloodline ===
During the Colossus: Bloodline limited series, Colossus made a trip to Russia in response to a call for help from his cousin, journalist Larisa Mishchenko. Her research had established that their family descended from Grigori Rasputin, and that their relatives were being systematically murdered. Rasputin is established as having been a powerful mutant, whose power and life essence had been passed down to his descendants. As his descendants are murdered, his great power is invested in greater measure in the remaining descendants. When there is only one descendant left, Rasputin will be reborn within that individual. Mister Sinister, an old ally of Rasputin, is revealed as the man behind the murders.

Larisa is murdered by Sinister, but Colossus and his brother Mikhail foil Sinister's plot, and Mikhail banishes himself to a dimension where he can never die, but from which he can never return. If Sinister were to murder Colossus, Rasputin would be reborn in Mikhail, but locked in a dimension on his own. However, all those involved remained unaware of Colossus' son, Peter, in the Savage Land, whose presence could severely alter the situation. Colossus returned to the X-Men, a man without family. It is rumoured that the boy Michael Termani escaped the extermination and made his way to the United States of America in search of Colossus, whom he may be related to.

=== Breakworld and beyond ===
During an attack on the institute, Colossus engages Sebastian Shaw, although "Shaw" turned out to be an illusory attack by Cassandra Nova. It was revealed that Colossus is the mutant destined to destroy Breakworld according to Breakworld's precogs. However, on a mission to Breakworld, the X-Men discover that this was not an actual prophecy but an elaborate scheme created by Aghanne, the insane leader of a Breakworld reform cult, intended to bring about that world's destruction. Colossus is chosen for the prophecy as his unique organic steel form would allow him to destroy the planet's power source, initiating a chain reaction that would destroy the entire world. Realizing this, Colossus refuses to kill the planet although he does threaten to seize power and rule it if Breakworld destroys the Earth as planned.

During the "World War Hulk" storyline, Colossus is one of the X-Men members who try to defend Professor X against the Hulk, who has come looking for Charles as he is one of the members of the secret Illuminati that exiled him from Earth. During their battle, the Hulk reflects on Colossus' bravery, mentioning that Colossus might have made a "decent opponent" to the Hulk's previous incarnations. Locked in a test of strength, Hulk demonstrates his superior power by bending Colossus's arms backwards at the forearms, breaking them. Beast later uses a laser in the lab to heat his arms up near their melting point, while Strong Guy bends them back into place; his arms needed to be re-set in their metal form before he transformed back to his human form to avoid serious injury to them.

Colossus returns to Russia with Wolverine and Nightcrawler along for the ride. The trio are captured by the Russian government, who wish to find out why all their mutant agents succumbed to M-Day, and Colossus did not. This led to a battle against the Russians and Omega Red, who was being examined by their captors. After defeating Omega Red, the heroes receive a call from Cyclops informing them of their new home in San Francisco. They soon arrive back in the States, where they aid in rebuilding the X-Men.

Colossus was briefly a member of the Fifty State Initiative team called The Last Defenders alongside Nighthawk, She-Hulk, and Blazing Skull.

Joining the rest of the X-Men, Colossus relocates to San Francisco. Still mourning Kitty, the other X-Men try to cheer him up using various different methods from picking fights with him to throwing a party. In the end he tells them to leave him be, he just needs time. Later while walking through Golden Gate Park, he come across a little girl who needs help rescuing her cat from a tree to which he replies that nothing would make him happier.

=== X-Infernus ===
Colossus feels the X-Men are not doing enough to rescue Illyana from Limbo, and is upset. With the aid of Pixie, the team is able to enter Limbo, where they encounter hostile demons. After defeating the demons, the X-Men locate Illyana, who has been defeated by Witchfire. The X-Men and Magik defeat Witchfire by trapping her in the dimension that houses the Elder Gods. Illyana leaves Limbo with the X-Men when Cyclops and Colossus offer her a home.

=== Utopia ===
When the Dark Avengers head into San Francisco to battle any X-Men they can find, Colossus battles Venom. They later face off again when the combined Dark Avengers and Dark X-Men attack Utopia, with Colossus and the X-Men emerging victorious.

It's also during this time that Colossus has depression due to the loss of Kitty prior to the Messiah Complex. During this period, Magik arrives at Utopia to ask for help from the X-Men and her former teammates as there's a battle coming in Limbo. The reunion helps alleviate some of Colossus's depression, but after Magneto comes to Utopia, Magneto brings the bullet carrying Kitty back to Earth to save her in a show of good faith and Kitty and Colossus are reunited, but are initially unable to touch as Kitty spent so long phased to stop the bullet hitting something that she has 'forgotten' how to resume a tangible state on her own. Due to Warlord Krunn's mutant cure, Colossus was temporarily depowered and beaten in battle by him, but other Breakworld residents were able to restore Kitty to her fully tangible state.

=== Fear Itself ===
Colossus as the newly appointed Juggernaut on the cover of The Uncanny X-Men #543 (September 2011). Art by Greg Land.

After the Juggernaut became Kuurth: Breaker of Stone during the "Fear Itself" storyline, one of the Heralds of a long-dormant god of fear known as the Serpent, Colossus made a bargain with Cyttorak, the other-dimensional being who originally empowered the Juggernaut, to gain the power to stand against Kuurth. Colossus became the new avatar of the Juggernaut and was able to push Cain Marko back until Cain was summoned by The Serpent. This decision caused Kitty to break up with Colossus, as she cannot cope with his increasingly displayed willingness to sacrifice himself when she wants someone who will be willing to live for her.

Due to this, Colossus decides to stay on Utopia with Cyclops' team of X-Men instead of returning to Westchester due to his fear of his new Juggernaut powers being unsafe around children. After another stressful battle, Colossus realized that his powers were far more dangerous than he realized, and he requested to be locked up alongside his sister, only to be freed when needed on missions.

=== Avengers vs. X-Men ===
At the onset of the "Avengers vs. X-Men" storyline, Colossus is featured in fights against several characters, including Spider-Man, Red Hulk, and Thing. He is one of the few X-Men teleported by Magik to the dark side of the moon to confront the Avengers over Hope Summers. When the disruptor devised by Iron Man blasts and divides the Phoenix Force, part of it bonds to Colossus, who becomes one of the Phoenix Five along with Cyclops, Emma Frost, Magik and Namor. He attempts to release his Juggernaut powers, but Cyttorak refuses, citing his affiliation with the Phoenix due to his newfound destructive powers. While empowered with his fragment of the Phoenix Force, Colossus attempts to regain Kitty's affections, but she rejects him—wary of his power-mongering and that the Phoenix has changed him for the worse—he reacts angrily. Colossus is eventually defeated when Spider-Man manages to provoke him and Magik into attacking each other, causing them to incapacitate each other. Their Phoenix powers dissipate and are absorbed by Emma Frost and Cyclops (Namor having already been defeated). Following the defeat of Cyclops as the last of the Phoenix Five, Colossus and the other former members of the Phoenix Five did not surrender themselves to the authorities. Magik later purges the Juggernaut powers from Colossus with her Soulsword. Knowing that Magik could have repelled his servitude to Cyttorak at any time and that she made him keep the Juggernaut powers to teach him a lesson, Colossus evinces hatred toward the sister he once loved, going so far as to say he wants her killed.

=== X-Force ===
Colossus's powers have gone out of control, apparently as a result of losing the Phoenix Force, causing parts of him to shift between flesh and organic steel rather than all flesh or all organic steel. He now appears as a member of Cable's new X-Force team after Cable provides him with a device that stabilizes his condition.

=== Amazing X-Men ===
Colossus rejoined Wolverine's team of X-Men after his sister convinced him to, after quitting Cable's X-Force team following the results of the Cable and X-Force/Uncanny X-Force: Vendettas storyline. He has since regained control of his organic steel powers and has stopped wearing Cable's harness which helped him to stabilize his flesh and steel forms.

During this time, Cyttorak caused the Crimson Gem to reappear in the ancient temple and triggered a call for suitable candidates to become a new Juggernaut, which led to Colossus and Cain Marko joining a team of X-Men to stop the Gem from being claimed by forces such as Man-Killer and the former Living Monolith. However, when Adbol acquired the Gem for himself, Colossus invoked Cyttorak to confront him about the failure of all of his past Juggernauts, suggesting that Cyttorak withdraw his power from Adbol and empower a new avatar to a greater extent than any before. Unfortunately, Cyttorak chose to empower Marko rather than Colossus, with Marko resolving to destroy the X-Men present and then move on to kill Cyclops for the death of Professor X. With Marko now even immune to psychic attacks, he appeared truly unstoppable, but Colossus was able to defeat him by outmaneuvering the super-empowered Marko until he could strike the sea side cliff edge where they had been fighting, causing Cain to fall into the ocean below, taking him out of the fight at least for the moment.

=== Extraordinary X-Men ===
Colossus later joins Storm's new team of X-Men who are living in an isolated part of Limbo after magically transporting the mansion there, renaming it X-Haven. Their mission is to provide a refuge and protect mutants from the effects of the M-Pox that has infected the mutants and rendered almost all of the mutant species sterile due to the Terrigen in the atmosphere. During the Apocalypse Wars, Colossus, Ernst, Anole, Glob Herman, and No-Girl are separated from Storm's team. When they re-encounter the missing students, they discover them to now be adults protecting an ark of 600 artificially created mutant embryos from the Four Horsemen of Apocalypse, one of whom is a celestially altered Colossus.

=== Inhumans vs X-Men and X-Men Gold ===
After Beast discovers that there is no cure for the M-Pox and no way to alter the Terrigen Mist cloud, the X-Men are left with the choice to either stay on earth and fight for their right to live and risk becoming extinct in a matter of weeks or leave earth and start fresh somewhere else. The X-Men decide to go to war against the Inhumans to decide the fate of the Terrigen. With the war underway Colossus is stationed at X-Haven to protect it from a potential Inhuman counter-attack. When the Inhuman Royal Family arrives to do just that, Colossus is left to face them on his own. He later joins the rest of the X-Men in Iceland in the final battle against the Inhumans, where Medusa finally understands what the X-Men are fighting for and voluntarily destroys the Terrigen.

After the Terrigen is destroyed, the X-Men send the refugees back home from X-Haven now that earth is habitable for mutants again. Still, the X-Men find themselves wondering how to move forward with the events of the war still fresh in their minds. Storm asks Kitty Pryde to return to the X-Men and take her place as leader, and in doing so Kitty moves the mansion from Limbo to Central Park and creates a new field team and recruits Colossus. Colossus and Kitty share many awkward moments given their history, trying to move forward as friends but still feeling a chemistry.

== Powers and abilities ==
Colossus is a mutant with the ability to transform his entire body into a form of "organic steel", with properties similar to osmium but of still unknown composition. Colossus must transform his entire body into this armored state; he cannot transform only a portion of his body. When he transforms, he gains approximately 1 ft (30 cm) in height; official figures state his height at about 7 ft 7 in (230 cm) in transformed state versus 6 ft 7 in (200 cm) in normal human form. His weight is more than doubled. In his armored form, Colossus possesses superhuman strength, as well as superhuman stamina and durability. His physical strength is currently greater than when he first joined the X-Men, due to the realignment of his cells by Magneto following an injury during the Mutant Massacre. While in his armored form, Colossus requires no food, water or even oxygen to sustain himself and is extremely resistant to injury. He is capable of withstanding great impacts, large caliber bullets, falling from tremendous heights, electricity, and certain magical attacks. While he has great resistance to temperature extremes of hot and cold, extreme heat followed by rapid super-cooling has been shown to cause damage. As he is vulnerable to the anti-metal Antarctic Vibranium in his metal form, his body instinctively shifts to human form when faced with an Antarctic Vibranium weapon.

Colossus is a capable hand-to-hand combatant, having been trained in Judo by Cyclops. He has had training in acrobatics and sword fighting from Nightcrawler. In his human form, he is still very strong and in fit physical condition, though not superhumanly so. He has completed college-level courses at Xavier's school.

As the avatar of Cyttorak, Colossus gained additional superhuman strength and resistance to injury, as well as other mystical powers. Among these was the power to ignore impediments to his movement, hence the "unstoppable" moniker. These powers were later taken away from Colossus and returned to Cain Marko.

== Reception ==
- In 2006, IGN placed Colossus in the 10th spot of their list of "The Top 25 X-Men".
- In 2008, Wizard ranked Colossus at 184 on the "Top 200 Comic Book Characters of All Time".
- In 2013, ComicsAlliance ranked Colossus as No. 22 on their list of the "50 Sexiest Male Characters in Comics".
- In 2014, Entertainment Weekly ranked Colossus 11th in their "Let's rank every X-Man ever" list.
- In 2018, CBR.com ranked Colossus 7th in their "Age Of Apocalypse: The 30 Strongest Characters In Marvel's Coolest Alternate World" list.
- In 2018, CBR.com ranked Colossus 13th in their "X-Force: 20 Powerful Members" list.

== Other versions ==
Various alternate versions of Colossus have appeared throughout the character's publication history, particularly in stories set in alternate universes.

=== Age of Apocalypse ===
In Age of Apocalypse, Colossus is part of an X-Men team that was formed by Magneto following the death of Charles Xavier. After years of fighting for Magneto's cause, Colossus eventually decides to retire from the X-Men.

=== Age of Revelation ===
In a possible future depicted in "Age of Revelation", Colossus forms a close bond with Bronze, who possesses similar powers to him.

=== Ultimate Marvel ===
In the Ultimate Marvel universe, Colossus is depicted as gay and is a former arms dealer who joined the X-Men after his associates were killed.

=== Ultimate Universe ===
In the Ultimate Universe imprint, Colossus is one of the leaders of the Eurasian Republic, a power bloc with Russia as its center of political power.

== In other media ==
=== Television ===
- Colossus appears in Spider-Man and His Amazing Friends, voiced by John Stephenson. This version is a member of the X-Men.
- Colossus appears in X-Men: Pryde of the X-Men, voiced by Dan Gilvezan.
- Colossus appears in X-Men: The Animated Series, voiced by Robert Cait. This version was initially driven out of his unspecified home country due to property damage.
  - Colossus appears in X-Men '97, voiced again by Robert Cait. Following Magik's death, Colossus joins the Acolytes before defecting to the X-Men.
- Colossus appears in X-Men: Evolution, voiced by Michael Adamthwaite. This version joined Magneto's Acolytes after the latter threatened to hurt his family. Following Magneto's disappearance, Colossus returns to Russia, but later helps the X-Men fight Apocalypse. In a vision of the future that Professor X has in the series finale, Colossus has officially joined the X-Men.
- Colossus appears in the Wolverine and the X-Men three-part episode "Hindsight", voiced by Nolan North. This version was a member of the X-Men until they disbanded following Jean Grey's disappearance. A year later, when Professor X tasks Wolverine with reuniting the X-Men, Colossus declines. Prior to the series' cancellation, Colossus was set to reappear in the second season alongside his sister Illyana.
- Colossus makes cameo appearances in The Super Hero Squad Show, voiced by Tom Kenny.
- Colossus makes a non-speaking cameo appearance in the Marvel Anime: X-Men episode "Destiny - Bond" as a member of the X-Men.
- Colossus appears in Marvel Disk Wars: The Avengers, voiced by Takahiro Fujimoto in the Japanese version and by Neil Kaplan in the English dub. This version is a member of the X-Men.

=== Film ===
Colossus as he appears in Deadpool (2016).

- Colossus makes a cameo appearance in X-Men (2000), portrayed by Donald Mackinnon. This version is a student of the Xavier Institute.
- Colossus appears in X2, portrayed by Daniel Cudmore. He has a more prominent role in this film as he helps the younger students at the Xavier Institute escape from William Stryker's men, and is briefly seen using his powers.
- Colossus appears X-Men: The Last Stand, portrayed again by Daniel Cudmore. As of this film, he has joined the X-Men.
- Colossus appears in X-Men: Days of Future Past, portrayed again by Daniel Cudmore. He assists his fellow X-Men in averting a post-apocalyptic, Sentinel-dominated future, being killed by a Sentinel in the process. After Kitty Pryde helps Logan change the timeline, Colossus has become a teacher at the Xavier Institute alongside Pryde. Additionally, a viral marketing website promoting the film reveals Colossus to be one of several mutant babies born prematurely after the Chernobyl disaster.
- Colossus appears in Deadpool via CGI based on motion-capture stunts by Andre Tricoteux and T.J. Storm, initial face shapes by Glenn Ennis, final facial performance by motion-capture supervisor Greg LaSalle, and voiced by Stefan Kapičić. Deadpool director Tim Miller originally offered Cudmore the role, but he declined.
- Colossus appears in Deadpool 2, voiced again by Kapičić, who also provides facial performance capture, and physically portrayed again by Andre Tricoteux.
- Colossus appears in Deadpool & Wolverine, voiced again by Kapičić.

=== Video games ===
- Colossus appears in The Uncanny X-Men.
- Colossus appears as a playable character in X-Men: Madness in Murderworld.
- Colossus appears in X-Men II: The Fall of the Mutants.
- Colossus appears as a playable character in X-Men (1992).
- Colossus appears as a playable character in X-Men: Children of the Atom.
- Colossus appears as an assist character in Marvel vs. Capcom: Clash of Super Heroes.
- Colossus appears as a playable character in Marvel vs. Capcom 2: New Age of Heroes.
- Colossus appear as a non-player character (NPC) in X-Men: Reign of Apocalypse.
- Colossus appears as an NPC in X2: Wolverine's Revenge, voiced by Christopher Corey Smith. This version works at a prison called the Void.
- Colossus appears as a playable character in X-Men Legends, voiced by Earl Boen.
- Colossus appears in X-Men Legends II: Rise of Apocalypse, voiced by Jim Ward.
- Colossus appears as a playable character in the Game Boy Advance version of X-Men: The Official Game, voiced by Brad Abrell.
- Colossus appears as a playable character in the Wii, Xbox 360, Xbox One, PS3, PlayStation 4, and remastered PC versions of Marvel: Ultimate Alliance, voiced by Crispin Freeman. Additionally, he appears as a playable character in the PS2, PSP, Xbox, and original PC version via a mod, and the possessed "Dark Colossus" appears as a boss across all versions of the game.
- Colossus appears in Marvel: Ultimate Alliance 2, voiced by Nolan North. He appears a boss in the Pro-Registration campaign and an NPC in the Anti-Registration campaign.
- Colossus appears in X-Men: Destiny, voiced by André Sogliuzzo.
- Colossus appears as a playable character in Marvel Super Hero Squad Online.
- Colossus appears as a playable character in Marvel Avengers Alliance.
- Colossus appears as a playable character in Marvel Heroes, voiced by Chris Cox.
- Colossus appears as an unlockable playable character in Lego Marvel Super Heroes, voiced by John DiMaggio.
- Two incarnations of Colossus appear as playable characters in Marvel Contest of Champions.
- Colossus appears as a playable character in Marvel Future Fight.
- Colossus appears as a playable character in Marvel Ultimate Alliance 3: The Black Order, voiced again by Chris Cox.

=== Miscellaneous ===
- Colossus appears in the Astonishing X-Men motion comics, initially voiced by Dan Green and later by Trevor Devall.
- Colossus appears in Planet X.

== Collected editions ==
Title	Material collected	Published date	ISBN
X-Men: Colossus: God's Country	X-Men Origins: Colossus, material from Classic X-Men #5, 21, 29, Marvel Comics Presents #10-17, X-Men Unlimited (vol. 1) #29, X-Men Unlimited (vol. 2) #14	February 2016	978-0785195252
X-Men: Colossus: Bloodline	X-Men: Colossus: Bloodline #1-5	April 2006	978-0785119005
Excalibur Epic Collection: The Battle For Britain	Colossus #1 and Excalibur #104-115, -1, Kitty Pryde: Agent of S.H.I.E.L.D. #1-3, New Mutants: Truth or Death #1-3	March 2022	978-1302934460

== See also ==
- List of Russian superheroes
