= Lockheed (character) =

Fictional character in the Marvel Comics universe

- Lockheed, from the cover of X-Men: Kitty Pryde - Shadow & Flame #4 (November 2005). Art by Paul Smith.

Publication information
- Publisher: Marvel Comics
- First appearance: The Uncanny X-Men #166 (Feb. 1983)
- Created by: Chris Claremont (writer); Paul Smith (artist)

In-story information
- Species: Flock
- Team affiliations: Marauders; S.W.O.R.D. Pet Avengers; X-Men; Xavier Institute; Excalibur; The Flock; Jean Grey School
- Abilities: Fire projection Flight; Empathy

Lockheed is a fictional character appearing in American comic books published by Marvel Comics. The character appears most commonly in association with the X-Men. He is a dragon-like alien and the longtime companion of Kitty Pryde, a member of the X-Men and Excalibur.

Lockheed makes sporadic minor appearances in X-Men related animated television series and made his live-action debut in the 2020 film The New Mutants.

== Publication history ==
Lockheed was created by writer Chris Claremont and artist Paul Smith and first appeared in Uncanny X-Men #166 (February 1983).

== Fictional character biography ==
In The Uncanny X-Men #153, "Kitty's Fairy Tale", Kitty Pryde tells a bedtime story to Illyana Rasputin that places the X-Men in the roles of fairy tale characters. One such character was a black dragon named Lockheed, based on the X-Men's Lockheed SR-71 Blackbird aircraft.

Not long afterward, the X-Men are captured by the alien race, the Brood, and taken to a Brood-colonized planet. Kitty meets a purple dragon-like alien who resembles the creature from her fairy tale, which she also names Lockheed.

Lockheed saves Kitty from the Brood, and then secretly departs along with her. She, as well as Professor X and her teammates, are unaware of his presence in the X-Mansion until he saves Kitty from a nest of Sidri hatchlings. The X-Men accept his presence, and Lockheed has since become Kitty's longtime companion.

To a lesser degree, Lockheed also bonds with Illyana Rasputin, who, after being abducted into the dimension of Limbo (also known as Otherplace) by the sorcerer Belasco, had aged into a teenager, manifested her own mutant powers, and been installed as Kitty's roommate. Lockheed occasionally accompanies Illyana after she joins the X-Men's "junior team", the New Mutants, including an adventure where the two encounter Brood-controlled clones of the X-Men.

=== Secret Wars ===
During the Secret Wars storyline, Lockheed and the X Men are transported to a planet nicknamed "Battleworld". There, Lockheed meets a green, female alien dragon, supposedly created by the Beyonder's lingering power. This dragon accompanies Lockheed and his allies to Earth, but grows to a gigantic size upon arrival and rampages across Tokyo. She seemingly vanishes from existence when Lockheed rejects her, though she eventually resurfaces. In the companion series Spider-Man and the Secret Wars, it is shown that Lockheed spent some time protecting Denver, Colorado after it was taken to Battleworld.

=== Excalibur ===
In addition to serving with the X-Men alongside Kitty, he joins her when she co-founds the British superhero team Excalibur. There he would form a friendship with Widget.

Lockheed participates in the so-called Cross-Time Caper, which involves him and his teammates leaping through dimensions on a train. The train itself is from an alternate universe, and it is discovered that its power source is an alternate version of Lockheed. The two Lockheeds become good friends, although the other Lockheed desires to stay on the train. Lockheed travels with the team and their ally, Alistaire Stuart on several adventures throughout multiple realities. The team also encounters a humanoid version of Lockheed. He and a female Nightcrawler analogue together adopt the identity of Captain Britain, protecting the citizens of a magic-heavy planet. Near the end of the Caper, Lockheed and the team believe Kitty to be lost in the dimensions; in reality she had been transported home earlier than the rest of the group. The intervention of Saturnyne allows the team to return home.

Eventually, Lockheed's decision to leave with Kitty and the X-Men comes back to haunt him. By leaving so unexpectedly, he had abandoned his fiancée, whom he had been due to wed the following day. While healing from injuries gained from fighting Doctor Doom, his astral form is apprehended by the Flock and made to stand trial for treason. After managing to explain his motives and saving his fellows from a piloting accident, he is officially exiled from his race, but on amicable terms.

Lockheed's affections for Kitty earn him the ire of the Bamfs, characters from the fairy tale Kitty once told Illyana who resemble Nightcrawler and originate from an alternate universe where the story's events were real. At one point, jealous of Lockheed's relationship with Kitty, the Bamfs invade the tunnels under Muir Island and hold him prisoner for some time. Lockheed's penchant for hiding after Kitty moves does not help his situation, as Kitty simply believes he is being difficult.

Lockheed develops a severe distaste for the secret agent Pete Wisdom, Kitty's love interest. Lockheed demonstrates that he has the ability to speak, but only talks to Wisdom, telling him that he "hates him". Wisdom tells Kitty about this, but she believes he is only joking, and he suffers the frequent theft of his clothing and cigarettes. Lockheed does save Wisdom's life at one point, but states that he still does not like him. It appears that one reason Lockheed dislikes Wisdom so much is that he much prefers Kitty's previous boyfriend, Colossus. This is demonstrated at the wedding of Captain Britain and Meggan, when Lockheed attempts to help them reconnect by snatching the bride's garter and dropping it into Piotr's hands just after Kitty had won Meggan's bouquet.

Later, after Kitty left Excalibur and the X-Men entirely, it is believed that Lockheed had died. In reality, Lockheed had been found, wounded and confused, by a pair of girls who practiced witchcraft. He bonds with them until he discovers that the girls use their abilities to terrorize the local populace. The duo were soon humiliated in battle by their rival, another young girl with powers. This new friend heals Lockheed and directs him back to Kitty.

=== Back on the X-Men ===
Kitty eventually rejoins the X-Men and Lockheed happily follows. When the X-Men battle the alien Ord, Lockheed saves the day with his fire breath.

Lockheed becomes part of a training exercise for the younger students at Xavier's institute. He serves as the "flag" in a game of Capture the Flag, hiding in the middle of the hedge maze. This created problems because many of the students found it hard to believe that he exists; the mutant Wither ends up endangering Lockheed with his organic-destruction powers.

=== Agent of S.W.O.R.D. ===
It is revealed that Lockheed is a mole within the Institute for S.W.O.R.D. Abigail Brand, S.W.O.R.D.'s director, tells Kitty to stop coddling Lockheed like a "starlet's chihuahua", that he was an informant in exchange for S.W.O.R.D.'s help with pressing issues on his homeworld, and that he could speak more languages than the X-Men's resident genius, the Beast. The shocked team looked on as Lockheed flies away from Kitty. The X-Men then join forces with S.W.O.R.D. in an attempt to end the confrontation with the alien race of Breakworld, who are attempting to destroy Earth with a giant missile. Kitty is assigned with the team appointed to stop the missile, while Lockheed is forced to remain behind. The two share a final lingering look before Kitty leaves. It is revealed that the missile is actually a giant bullet, and Kitty becomes trapped inside it. While grieving over Kitty, Lockheed drinks heavily to help with the pain. Eventually, Brand reveals that Kitty is still alive within the bullet, but they cannot get her out yet. Lockheed then approaches a villain named Unit for help, but after learning that he would have to free Unit from prison, he changes his mind and leaves.

Kitty and Lockheed reunite in Astonishing X-Men (vol. 3) #38. He has since joined her at the Jean Grey School for Higher Learning, teaching a class entitled "Knowing Your Alien Races, And How To Kill Them".

=== Lockjaw and the Pet Avengers ===
In the mini-series Lockjaw and the Pet Avengers, Lockheed teams up with Lockjaw, Redwing, Zabu, Niels (Speedball's cat, who possesses similar powers to him), a frog Thor, and Ms. Lion (May Parker's dog) on a quest for the Infinity Gems. He expresses great grief over the loss of Kitty and his estrangement from his homeworld. In another instance, he expresses feelings of guilt over acting as a mole for S.W.O.R.D, stating that he had already "betrayed too many friends and allies in the past". Lockheed is given the Time Gem during this adventure.

=== X-Men Gold ===
Lockheed attends Kitty's wedding rehearsal dinner, bringing along his dragon family.

== Powers and abilities ==
Lockheed looks like a small European dragon about the size of a cat. He has purple skin, sharp claws and teeth, two small, curved horns protruding from the back of his head, and wings that enable him to fly. He can breathe extremely intense fire and is a surprisingly formidable combatant for his size, having once destroyed a nest of Sidri hatchlings and at another time bested a fully armored medieval knight-in-training. The Brood that he confronted upon his first appearance were terrified and immediately fled upon seeing him. His brain is immune to telepathic probing by telepaths such as Professor X. He is empathic, able to understand human speech, and although he rarely does so is able to speak English as well.

== Reception ==
- In 2014, Entertainment Weekly ranked Lockheed 68th in their "Let's rank every X-Man ever" list.
- In 2021, CBR.com ranked Lockheed 3rd in their "10 Smartest Marvel Sidekicks" list.
- In 2022, Newsarama ranked Lockheed 9th in their "Best superhero sidekicks of all time" list.

== Character evolution ==
Lockheed's appearance and character, as depicted by the various artists who illustrated him and writer Chris Claremont, evolved from the time of his first appearance to his later appearances in Excalibur. When he first appeared as drawn by Paul Smith, he was largely quadrupedal, with red eyes, a triangular head, and dog-like intelligence. In Excalibur, as drawn by Alan Davis, he possesses a more anthropomorphic design with an oblong head, black eyes, and a longer jaw.

Lockheed is capable of speech, but initially did not display the ability to do so. Additionally, only Kitty Pryde and some others can understand him.

== Other versions ==
=== Earth-1289 ===
An alternate universe version of Lockheed from Earth-1289 appears in Excalibur.

=== Mutant X ===
An alternate universe version of Lockheed from Earth-1298 appears in Mutant X. This version is a member of the Starjammers.

=== Secret Wars ===
Lock, a Chinese dragon-inspired version of Lockheed from Earth-13116, appears in Secret Wars.

=== X-Babies ===
Locksteed, a character based on Lockheed from Earth-71912, appears in X-Babies.

== In other media ==
=== Television ===
- Lockheed appears in X-Men: Pryde of the X-Men, voiced by Frank Welker. This version is initially an inhabitant of Asteroid M before escaping with the X-Men.
- Lockheed appears in The Super Hero Squad Show episode "Mysterious Mayhem at Mutant High!".
- Lockheed is teased in X-Men: Evolution as a stuffed toy in Kitty Pride's room.

=== Film ===
Lockheed appears in The New Mutants. This version is a companion to Illyana Rasputin / Magik who resides in Limbo until he is summoned to aid her. Illyana also has a puppet of Lockheed in her possession.

=== Video games ===
- Lockheed appears as an assist character in Marvel: Avengers Alliance.
- Lockheed appears as an unlockable assist character in Marvel Puzzle Quest.
- Lockheed appears as an unlockable upgrade for Shadowcat in Uncanny X-Men: The Days of Future Past.
- Lockheed appears as a non-playable character in Marvel Heroes.
- Lockheed appears in Marvel Strike Force.
- Lockheed appears as a background map object on the Krakoa Map of Marvel Rivals.

=== Novels ===
Lockheed appears in the novelization for X-Men: The Last Stand.

=== Tabletop Games ===
Lockheed appears alongside Kity Pryde/Shadowcat in Marvel Crisis Protocol.
