= Technet (comics) =

Fictional comic book group

The Technet
- The original Technet.

Publication information
- Publisher: Marvel Comics
- First appearance: Captain Britain #4 (April 1985)
- Created by: Alan Davis

In-story information
- Type of business: Bounty hunters
- Owner(s): Gatecrasher
- Employee(s): Bodybag; China Doll; Elmo; Ferro; Ferro2; Joyboy; Numbers; Ringtoss; Scatterbrain; Thug; Waxworks; Yap

The Technet are a fictional group of interdimensional travelling bounty hunters appearing in British and American comic books published by Marvel Comics. The characters appeared mostly in the pages of Captain Britain and Excalibur.

The Technet is a team of bounty hunters, founded and originally led by a villain called Gatecrasher, from various other dimensional worlds. For a price they will hunt down and capture fugitive sentient beings, rescue prisoners from captivity, or track down and retrieve lost objects of value. The Technet range through time, space, and various dimensions in their operations.

== Members ==
The members of the Technet have included:

- Gatecrasher, the leader of the Technet, is a large, blue-skinned humanoid. She possesses telepathy, skills in biogenic nucleotronic splicing, and superhuman strength.
- Bodybag is an enormous reptilian biped, who sprays victims with a green narcotic ooze before swallowing them, paralyzed and unconscious, into one of his three back-sacs, where they are kept paralyzed. If the cocoon is broken open, the victim will soon recover.
- China Doll has a humanoid body above the waist and a serpentine one beneath. She can shrink other beings to trinket-size with her touch.
- Elmo is a pink-skinned alien with tentacles who can "dampen" the energy level of other beings.
- Ferro is a four-armed, furry biped and a master swordsman who wields swords with all four of his arms. He is killed by Warwolves, apparently after his warranty expired.
- Ferro^{2} is the identical brother of Ferro, and replaces him in the team following his death.
- Hard-Boiled Henry is an artificial being resembling a small humanoid bird who was created by Gatecrasher as a weapon. He is able to self-destruct with the force of a bomb.
- Joyboy resembles a grotesquely large-headed and fat humanoid baby, floating around in a levitating, cybernetic egg-cradle. Joyboy can telepathically detect a person's greatest desire and use psionic powers to fulfill a distorted version of the wish. For instance, he helped Shadowcat regain her tangibility, but made her obese in the process. If Joyboy loses consciousness, his transformations are immediately undone.
- Numbers is a large, bug-eyed, reptilian biped; an accountant and negotiator for the team. Though physically formidable and imposing, Numbers displays no combat skills as a member of the Technet and is generally averse to fighting. Numbers later joined the Special Executive, where he demonstrated the ability to fire energy beams from either side of his head.
- Pandora is a large fungus that can quickly cover and consume organic material. Pandora is usually contained within a small sphere and is released only as a last resort.
- Ringtoss can emit rings composed of an unknown form of energy from her head to entrap an opponent. The rings cease to exist when Ringtoss loses consciousness. Ringtoss is particularly close to Waxworks.
- Scatterbrain, also known as Fascination, is a yellow-skinned, green-haired female humanoid alien who is apparently incapable of speech and feeds on the excess emotional energy of sentient beings. Scatterbrain can render a victim temporarily helpless by firing all of the victim's neural synapses at once.
- Thug is a short, squat and green biped with unusual strength for his size. He can draw future and past versions of himself to the present to help him in battle, but his limited intelligence also means he often quarrels with his other selves. He is the brother of Legion, a member of Special Executive.
- Waxworks is a jellyfish-like alien of the same species as Elmo. It can "soften" its opponents—to the point where their bodies stretch and distort out of control—with a touch.
- Yap is Gatecrasher's constant companion. He can teleport himself and his companions across vast distances. Yap also possesses telepathy, which allows him to track down specific individuals by detecting their psychic auras. Yap has an intense emotional dependency on Gatecrasher and refers to her as "mother," usually to Gatecrasher's annoyance.

== History ==
In the Technet's first recorded exploit, they were hired by Opul Lun Sat-Yr-9, the other dimensional counterpart of Opal Luna Saturnyne on an alternate Earth (Earth-794), to capture Kaptain Briton, an evil otherdimensional counterpart of Captain Britain. Kaptain Briton flees to Captain Britain's Earth and poses as him, switching his costume with that of Captain Britain. The members of Technet mistakenly take Captain Britain prisoner and bring him to Sat-Yr-9's Earth. There Captain Britain convinced the Technet that he was not the man they had been hired to capture, and the Technet join Captain Britain in battling Sat-Yr-9's troops.

Later, the Technet traveled on business to the Wereworlds, whose natives become werewolves under a full moon, having been exiled from their home by Sat-Yr-9. Elmo, a member of the Technet, is fatally wounded by the werewolves. Subsequently, Gatecrasher either seriously injured or killed a member of the 'Berserker Pirates' who attempted to interest her in becoming his lover. The pirate's family forces the Technet to turn over all their accumulated wealth as reparations. Angered by this reversal in their fortunes, all of the members of the Technet except for Yap and Fascination leave the team.

Gatecrasher travels to a celebration held by the despot of Kandahar. A person she believed to be the despot himself hires her to procure a perfect mathematical model of the universe that was held and revered by the Incas of 14th-century Peru. Gatecrasher, Yap, and Fascination journey through time to obtain the model, but Gatecrasher and Yap are tricked by the person they believed to be a native high priest into consuming fruit filled with the eggs of deadly parasites. Gatecrasher and Yap are forced to remain under a cooling waterfall to prevent the eggs from hatching and consuming their bodies. In actuality, an alien had impersonated both the despot of Kandahar and the high priest, and hoped to force Fascination into his employ. This alien had already succeeded in hiring the members of the Technet who had just left the group. His team was the Special Executive, a future version of the Technet.

Fascination brought Captain Britain and his companion Meggan to Peru to rescue Gatecrasher. Captain Britain gathers together the plants necessary to create an antidote to kill the parasites, which is given to Gatecrasher and Yap. They, Fascination, Captain Britain, and Meggan returned to their own time period.

Gatecrasher recruited new members Numbers and Waxworks into the Technet, and all of the former members except Elmo rejoined. At some point during this period, Fascination changed her name to Scatterbrain.

Opal Luna Saturnyne hires the Technet to capture Rachel Summers, whom Saturnyne claims is a threat to the universe. At this time, Rachel is on the run from Mojo, who had enslaved her to star in his movies. Mojo sends his servants, the Warwolves, after Rachel. The Warwolves and the Technet battle over Rachel and during the fight, Ferro is killed. Rachel is saved by Captain Britain, Meggan, Nightcrawler, and Shadowcat. Together they battle off the Technet, with Gatecrasher retreating. This battle against the Technet led directly to the formation of the team Excalibur by Summers and her allies. It was later revealed that Saturnyne had hired the Technet under orders of Roma, who needed to form the superhero team to save the multiverse.

The Technet are allowed to stay in Brighton, England, where they use their technology to provide the city with sunny weather. Meanwhile, they plot to capture Rachel Summers and regain their honor. During this time, they were hired by Sat-Yr-9, who had taken the identity of Courtney Ross. The Technet are hired to free Jamie Braddock. They succeed in their task, but Jamie was taken by Ross and the Technet's memories of their mission were wiped. Gatecrasher then constructed Hardboiled Henry, a living bomb, to ambush Excalibur. The Technet nearly defeat Excalibur, but agents of Saturnyne interfere. The Technet receives a holographic message from Saturnyne, telling them that they were permanently exiled to Earth-616 and that the bounty on Phoenix was cancelled. Furious, the Technet turn on Gatecrasher, but Gatecrasher and Yap teleport away. The Technet begs Excalibur for asylum and Nightcrawler told his teammates to accept. The former Technet repair the damage done by Hardboiled Henry to Excalibur's home. During these repairs, Numbers meets an alternate universe version of Lockheed who had been living in Excalibur's basement and falls in love with her. The British government comes to Excalibur's home for help against an invisible, murderous creature, but only Nightcrawler is home. Nightcrawler trains the aliens to become the N-Men and they manage to destroy the creature, but Joyboy disappears during this mission. Shortly afterwards the Special Executive appeared on Earth and told the N-Men that Earth will be destroyed in the next few hours. They offer the N-Men a job. The N-Men agree and teleport away, together with Numbers, the dragon, and their newly born children.

Excalibur manages to prevent Earth's destruction and found Joyboy with the Crazy Gang. Joyboy had formed a psychic bond with the Crazy Gang's Red Queen, using his powers to distort her nightmares and form a beautiful land. During this time, Gatecrasher began to go insane, seeing images of Hardboiled Henry, who accused her of making his death meaningless.

Later, Technet, the Crazy Gang and Feron, a misguided ally of Excalibur, all meet in chaos during the pre-wedding preparations for Brian and Meggan's wedding. It is resolved peacefully and everyone is allowed to attend the wedding itself.

The Technet later reappeared in the pages of Fantastic Four #6. In this appearance, Gatecrasher was the leader once more and Joyboy and Hardboiled Henry had returned as well. Roma had hired the Technet to capture Franklin Richards to investigate his incredible powers. The Fantastic Four and Roma came to an understanding and the Technet disappeared.

The Technet helped Rocket Raccoon with a heist during a period when he was separated from the Guardians of the Galaxy.

Technet next attempted to capture Xandra Neramani's egg, but were thwarted by Rogue and Gambit. They are next hired by Kang the Conqueror to distract the Avengers while Black Cat steals from the Grandmaster.

=== Special Executive ===
At some point in the future, the amalgamated group would come to be known as the Special Executive and travel back to the past where they would again encounter and oppose Captain Britain and Meggan earlier in the continuity.

Though the Special Executive is a future version of the Technet, it appeared first in comics. Due to time-travel, the Special Executive has interacted with its previous incarnation at several points.

== In other media ==
The Technet make a cameo appearance in the X-Men: The Animated Series episode "Proteus".
