= Warwolves =

Fictional comic book group

- A Warwolf from Excalibur (vol. 1) #2. Art by Alan Davis.

Publication information
- Publisher: Marvel Comics
- First appearance: Excalibur Special Edition (April 1988)
- Created by: Chris Claremont; Alan Davis

Characteristics
- Notable members: Bowzer; Ducks; Jacko; Popsie; Scarper; Amazing Baby

The Warwolves are fictional characters appearing in American comic books published by Marvel Comics.

== Fictional character biography ==
The Warwolves are a group of humanoid canines who work as extra-dimensional agents of Mojo. The Warwolves (Bowzer, Ducks, Jacko, Popsie, and Scarper) first appear on Earth when Phoenix escapes from captivity by Mojo, and Mojo sends the Warwolves to London to recapture her. The Warwolves, Nightcrawler, and Technet battle over Rachel Summers. When Captain Britain, Meggan, Nightcrawler, and Shadowcat help Rachel defeat the Warwolves, they come together as the team Excalibur. The Warwolves clash with Excalibur many times, operating out of a den near the tunnel Hob's End. Rachel kills Bowzer in one encounter and in another, an unnamed Warwolf is killed.

Later, the remaining Warwolves on Earth abduct Shadowcat. In an attempt to defeat the Warwolves once and for all, Shadowcat (who had allowed herself to be captured by posing as Phoenix) uses her phasing power to fuse with and control Ducks; she eventually escapes from Ducks with the aid of her team. The Warwolves are defeated and interred in the London Zoo, where they become a popular attraction despite their dangerous nature.

The two allegedly "dead" Warwolves return and team with the four captives, and kill people who resemble the X-Men to impersonate the X-Men and ambush Excalibur. They capture Rachel Summers, but are forced through an interdimensional portal by Excalibur, who rescues Rachel.

Roma, believing Franklin Richards to be a threat to the multiverse, dispatches the Warwolves, Gatecrasher, and Technet to kidnap him. Roma teleports the Fantastic Four to Otherworld when they oppose her plan. The Warwolves escape the zoo to get revenge on Excalibur, but are defeated and go into hiding.

Years later, the Warwolves appear in the employ of the interdimensional slave trader Tullamore Voge. When Nightcrawler and Bloody Bess invade Voge's child slave market to rescue the X-Men students Ziggy Karst and Scorpion Boy, Voge sends the Warwolves after them. They nearly kill Bess, but are defeated by Nightcrawler.

In Excalibur (vol. 4), Cullen Bloodstone buys the Warwolves from the zoo and enlists the members of Excalibur to help kill them. The group successfully kills the Warwolves, but Captain Britain discovers that one of the Warwolves had a young pup. The pup is given to Rachel Summers, who names it Amazing Baby.

== Powers and abilities ==
The Warwolves are humanoid canines who possess powerful claws and enhanced agility and senses. Additionally, they are resistant to psychic attacks and can drain life energy via their tongues. This destroys the victim's skeleton and internal organs, leaving behind an intact skin which the Warwolf can then wear to impersonate them.

== In other media ==
Amazing Baby appears in a skin for Rocket Raccoon in Marvel Rivals.
