= Cerise (comics) =

- Cerise as depicted in Excalibur #57 (November 1992). Art by Joe Madureira

Publication information
- Publisher: Marvel Comics
- First appearance: (Cameo): Excalibur #46 (January 1992) (Full) Excalibur #47 (February 1992)
- Created by: Alan Davis

In-story information
- Alter ego: Cerise
- Species: Shi'ar mutant
- Team affiliations: Excalibur; Graces
- Abilities: Superhuman strength and stamina; Red spectrum light force manipulation: Solid energy constructs creation; Concussive blasts; Flight

Cerise is a fictional superhero appearing in American comic books published by Marvel Comics, in particular those featuring Excalibur and other books of the X-Men franchise. Created by Alan Davis, the character first appeared in Excalibur #47 (March 1992).

== Publication history ==
Cerise first appeared in Excalibur #47 (March 1992), created by Alan Davis. Visually the character was a reuse of a design to be used in a proposed series called Warpforce, pitched to DC Comics by Davis and Paul Neary. When DC rejected the series, Davis decided to refine the design and include it in Excalibur.

== Fictional character biography ==
Cerise is an extraterrestrial from the planet Shaskofrugnon in the Shi'ar empire. As she has revealed in her first appearance, she is the gene stock of Subruki, Zarstock, and Kuli Ka. She was accidentally transported to Earth after deserting the empire's army, the Ghrand Jhar, refusing to fire upon innocents and as a result causing the death of her crew. She became a member of Excalibur upon encountering them, and later became romantically involved with Nightcrawler.

During the "Warpies Saga", wherein superhuman children were being manipulated, Cerise is baffled with the concept of "children". Shadowcat tries to explain to her how infants are born and grow up to become adults. Cerise reveals that she "emerged from the source" as she is.

Cerise is taken into custody by the Starjammers for her crimes against the Shi'ar empire. She is sent to the pan-dimensional prison Krag, where she is revealed to have destroyed the Shi'ar recruitment vehicle (Ghrand Jhar) to prevent it from carrying out further acts of genocide. Cerise is forced to kill Fang, a member of the Imperial Guard, in personal combat. Shi'ar empress Lilandra Neramani pardons Cerise for her crimes, given their circumstances. Cerise is allowed to serve out her prison sentence as a personal aide, investigating brutality and violence among Shi'ar officials.

Cerise appeared in the 2006 storyline "Annihilation" as a member of the Graces, a group of female warriors led by Gamora.

Cerise appeared in the 2018 series Mr. & Mrs. X, protecting the egg containing Xandra Neramani and enlisting the help of Gambit and Rogue.

== Powers and abilities ==
Cerise is a member of the alien Shi'ar race, making her physical abilities somewhat more powerful than an Earth human.

She also has the ability to generate and psionically manipulate energy fields of coherent red spectrum light force. She can project the light as simple brightness, or as concussive blasts, or use it to form solid energy constructs.

Cerise wears gloves that contain broad-band sensor arrays which allow her to search for specific life-forms, energy, and temporal/dimensional abnormalities in a surrounding area. She also wore a "transit suit" permitting travel through hyperspace. Her equipment was designed by Shi'ar scientists and craftsmen.

Cerise is a skilled warrior, having received combat training in the Shi'ar military, and is a trained starship navigator.

== Reception ==
=== Accolades ===
- CBR.com ranked Cerise 7th in their 2019 "10 Most Powerful Members Of Excalibur" and 9th in their 2024 "Nightcrawler's Greatest Relationships In Marvel Comics".
- In 2020, Scary Mommy included Cerise in their "Looking For A Role Model? These 195+ Marvel Female Characters Are Truly Heroic" list.

== Other versions ==
In the future timeline seen in X-Men: The End, Cerise is an elite member of the Imperial Guard is sent by Lilandra to rescue Jean Grey. While she completes her mission in rescuing Jean, her cover was blown by Mister Sinister and she is killed by his agent, Shaitan.
