= Special Executive =

Fictional comic book group

The Special Executive
- Selected Special Executive members - [l-r] Cobweb, Wardog, Fascination, Zeitgeist; [front] Legion. Art by Alan Davis.

Publication information
- Publisher: Marvel Comics
- First appearance: Doctor Who Monthly #51 (April 1981)
- Created by: Alan Moore (writer); David Lloyd (artist)

In-story information
- Type of business: Mercenaries

The Special Executive is a fictional group of time-traveling mercenaries appearing in American comic books published by Marvel Comics. The characters were depicted in comic strips published by Marvel UK. The initial incarnation was created by Alan Moore and David Lloyd for Doctor Who Monthly; Alan Davis later expanded the line-up when they appeared in Captain Britain.

== Publication history ==
Alan Moore has said that members of the Special Executive, including Wardog, originate from a massive, unpublished, unfinished space opera script that he began in 1977. Moore shelved the project after Steve Moore offered guidance in selling shorter stories in the British comics industry. In 1981, the Special Executive debuted in Doctor Who Monthly. Moore would later bring them into the Marvel Universe during his work on Captain Britain for Marvel UK.

The group first appeared in a short strip called "The 4-D War" in Doctor Who Monthly #51 (April 1981), published by the UK arm of Marvel Comics. The story was a follow-up to a strip called "Star Death" that Moore and Lloyd had produced for Doctor Who Monthly #47. They were created by Alan Moore and David Lloyd, and the initial line-up consisted of Wardog and Viridian the Brainfeeler - who was almost immediately killed. Moore planned a sequel strip, "Black Sun Rising", with Steve Dillon. However, Dillon's schedule meant that he was only able to contribute character designs for new additions Cobweb, Zeitgeist and Millennium, and when the story appeared in Doctor Who Monthly #57 the art was again by Lloyd. Millennium was again killed off very soon after being introduced. Moore would refuse to allow the characters to be used in future Doctor Who strips due to what he perceived to be poor treatment of his good friend Steve Moore (no relation).

In 1983, Moore incorporated them into the Captain Britain strip running in Marvel UK's The Daredevils, with artist Alan Davis. Moore and Davis devised additional members, including Legion, Fascination, Oxo and Lady Burning Fish, and the characters played a supporting role in the "Jaspers' Warp" storyline. The trilogy of Doctor Who Monthly strips were also reprinted in The Daredevils. In keeping with those stories, several of the characters were killed during the story. Following the conclusion of the storyline, Moore would leave Marvel UK on unhappy terms, and as a result he blocked any future use of the Special Executive. The team was subsequently reorganised into the similar Technet, which featured a mixture of the characters created by Davis (with some renamed and given different abilities) and new co-creations with Jamie Delano. Due to both being time-travelling bounty hunters the overlap in membership was used as a plot point, with their exploits being out-of-sequence for both the reader and the main protagonists of the Captain Britain and Excalibur stories.

== Group history ==
Centuries before the Technet was founded, there was the Special Executive, another group of time-traveling bounty hunters. Due to time travel though the Special Executive returned in time and tried to disband the Technet. The Special Executive at this time was led by an unnamed humanoid and members included Cobweb, Zeitgeist, Legion and several unnamed members. Despite the warnings of Cobweb that his plans would fail, the leader hoped to kill the Technet's leader Gatecrasher and recruit the powerful Fascination 300 years before she would join the Special Executive. The plan failed, and the Special Executive retreated.

At least a century later, the Special Executive's leader had died, and several members had been replaced. The new leader was named Wardog and they now worked for the Gallifreyans against the Order of the Black Sun. A member called Viridian the Brainfeeler was killed by the Order and Wardog lost his arm. Ten years later another member - Millennium - was mind-controlled by the Order against her team and Wardog was forced to kill her. Later, the Special Executive had recruited several members to its line-up, including Lady Burning Fish and Oxo, and went to Earth-616 in the late 20th century to recruit the Technet, now known as the N-Men. Cobweb told the N-Men that Earth was about to be destroyed and Wardog offered the N-men a place on the team. The N-men accepted and left with the team.

The Special Executive was hired to capture Captain Britain so that he could testify on Saturnyne's behalf in a cosmic trial. Saturnyne was accused of causing the chaos on the alternate world Earth-239, which was caused by a version of Mad Jim Jaspers. The world was destroyed, including all evidence of Saturnyne's innocence. Captain Britain was enraged by the trial and found it a farce; he fought the Captain Britain Corps and the Special Executive, feeling responsible for him, helped the hero out. Together they freed Saturnyne and returned to Earth-616, home of Captain Britain. The team stayed with Captain Britain in Braddock Manor, but Zeitgeist disagreed with Wardog on this course of action; Wardog felt obligated to help Captain Britain, whose world was menaced by another Mad Jim Jaspers. However Zeitgeist felt that they were mercenaries and had no obligation to anybody. Shortly after, the Fury attacked the manor, as the Wardog led his group to attack the creature. Oxo and a future incarnation of Legion died in the battle, and Wardog himself was badly injured. In the end, it was Zeitgeist who blinded the Fury long enough for the group to retaliate against it, but the Fury escaped. With his team in ruins, Wardog apologised to Captain Britain and the Special Executive left Earth.

== Members ==
Alan Moore wrote the Special Executive group similar to a superhero team. In a 1982 interview, Moore cited John Byrne's 1970s work on Uncanny X-Men as an inspiration. During a discussion with X-Men author Chris Claremont about the role of an artist in comics writing, Moore partly attributed the scope of the team to artist Alan Davis. Before Moore began writing for Captain Britain, Davis had already done scripts and continued to have plotting input. Moore said they expanded the team to improve the artwork.

[Alan Davis] liked the idea of bringing in the Special Executive and adding about six more members to them, and he liked the idea of having lots of characters around because it gave him new characters to design, new characters to draw.

— Alan Moore

- Wardog: the second leader of the Special Executive. A humanoid with a doglike appearance, Wardog is dashing, honourable, a brilliant strategist and a capable fighter. He has a cybernetic arm which has been torn off at least twice.
- Viridian the Brainfeeler: the team's telepath, killed by the Order of the Black Sun.
- Millennium: had control over time and could age others quickly. However, she was mind-controlled by the Order of the Black Sun and killed by Wardog.
- Cobweb: the team's precognitive, who is used to a non-linear perception of time. She doesn't always warn her teammates of dangers - on some occasions this is because she feels that her visions of the future can't be changed but at other times it's due to perceived personal slights - some of which are, paradoxically, only caused by her not warning the team in the first place.
- Zeitgeist: exists outside of time and space, making him intangible and undetectable to most opponents. When he passes through living beings while intangible, he can cause them great pain. He can also reform his body when damaged. He is a strict professional who doesn't believe in unpaid heroics.
- Fascination: she has the ability to fly, has superhuman strength and can cause distortions in her opponent's mind, effectively stunning them. Fascination can also teleport and track people over large distances. Despite her considerable power, she is not very intelligent, is unable to speak, and functions mostly on instinct. She feeds on emotions of the people around her - the stronger the emotion, the more nutritious it is for her. Another of Fascination's race named Scatterbrain was a member of the Technet.
- Legion:, brother of the Technet's Thug. While his brother only has superhuman strength and durability, Legion also had the ability to create copies of himself, summoned from his own future. Legion was doomed to die when the Fury killed one of his future incarnations in battle.
- Oxo: an insect-like creature was killed by The Fury.
- Lady Burning Fish: a small, amorphous being on a floating platform. She talked in the form of poems and could generate energy blasts.

=== Unconfirmed members ===
- A creature who looks exactly like the Technet's accountant Numbers is with the first Special Executive, but he is never named.
- Another creature seen with the Special Executive looks exactly like Technet member Ringtoss, but is also unnamed.

== In other media ==
- Doctor Who writer and Alan Moore scholar Lance Parkin wrote an unofficial text story called "Executive Action" (published in charity anthology Walking in Eternity) that explored the Special Executive's relationship with the Time Lords of Gallifrey.
