= Bamf =

Comic book onomatopoeia and race

- Nightcrawler surprises Spider-Man by teleporting in front of him.

Bamf /bæmf/, originally Bampf, is an onomatopoeic term originating in comic books published by Marvel Comics, in particular those featuring the superhero Nightcrawler of the X-Men. The term is derived from the sound Nightcrawler makes when teleporting.

== Sound ==
The "Bamf" sound is caused by air rushing into the space where Nightcrawler's body once was after he had teleported. It has been borrowed as a teleport sound by fans and a generic term for teleporting in general. The sound has become a standard in pop culture.

== Race ==
Bamf
- Nightcrawler cast as a "Bamf" in Kitty Pryde's bedtime story. Art by Dave Cockrum.

Publication information
- First appearance: Uncanny X-Men #153 (January 1982)
- Created by: Chris Claremont; Dave Cockrum

Characteristics
- Inherent abilities: Teleportation

Bamfs are also a race of creatures described as small imp-like versions of Nightcrawler, which accompany him wherever he goes. They first appeared in the first Nightcrawler miniseries in 1985, and became a regular fixture of X-Men comics in the early 2010s.

=== Earth-5311 ===
In Uncanny X-Men #153, Kitty Pryde tells a fairy tale to six-year-old Illyana Rasputin, which includes a race of creatures called "Bamfs", described as small imp-like versions of Nightcrawler. A Bamf enters the story after catching sight of Pirate Kitty, with whom he falls in love. He subsequently joins Kitty's team and aids in taking down Princess Jean (the counterpart of Jean Grey).

=== Earth-616 ===
In the 1985 miniseries Nightcrawler, Nightcrawler is sent to another universe identical to Kitty's fairy tale, where he encounters the Bamfs. Nightcrawler discovers that female Bamfs differ from the males in that they are taller, resembling female versions of himself. The male Bamfs are lecherous, flirtatious, and skirt-chasing, making them rather tiring company in the presence of females.

During the establishment of the Jean Grey School for Higher Learning, Bamfs infest the school after Beast accidentally opens a portal to their home reality. The Bamfs are later revealed to be demons and the children of a giant maggot and a changeling taking the form of a lamprey. The Bamfs were abandoned in the brimstone plains of Hell before being rescued by Azazel, who used his blood to transform them into imp-like forms resembling him.

== Powers and abilities ==
The Bamfs possess similar abilities to Nightcrawler, including the ability to teleport. They can enhance Nightcrawler's teleportation, enabling him to travel longer distances.

== Known Bamfs ==
- Chuckles – A Bamf who Wolverine named after Professor X.
- Pickles – A Bamf who lived in Beast's van.
