= Excalibur (comics) =

Marvel Comics superhero group

- Cover to Excalibur #1 (Oct. 1988), featuring the original members of Excalibur. Art by Alan Davis and Paul Neary.

Publication information
- Publisher: Marvel Comics
- First appearance: Excalibur Special Edition #1 (December 1, 1987, on sale)
- Created by: Chris Claremont (writer); Alan Davis (artist)

In-story information
- Base(s): The Lake House (Empress Matilda Docks, Rotherhithe); Lighthouse; Braddock Manor; Muir Isle

Excalibur is a superhero group appearing in American comic books published by Marvel Comics. They are depicted as an offshoot of the X-Men, usually based in the United Kingdom. Conceived by writer Chris Claremont and artist/co-writer Alan Davis, they first appeared in Excalibur Special Edition #1 (1987), also known as Excalibur: The Sword is Drawn. Stories involving this team have featured elements of both the X-Men and Captain Britain franchises, frequently involving cross-dimensional travel.

The initial Excalibur roster, which was featured in the first eponymous series from 1988 to 1998, consisted of original Captain Britain Brian Braddock and his lover Meggan, along with three former members of the X-Men: Shadowcat, Nightcrawler, and the second Phoenix, Rachel Summers. A new iteration of the team was featured in the 2005 series New Excalibur until the title was replaced in 2008 by Captain Britain and MI13. Another Claremont-written series entitled Excalibur, though with no connection to the original team, chronicled the efforts of X-Men founder Professor Charles Xavier and his former nemesis Magneto to rebuild the mutant homeland of Genosha.

The current iteration of the team is led by Betsy Braddock, who took up the Captain Britain mantle during the Dawn of X.

== Excalibur (vol. 1): 1988–1998 ==
Excalibur's original creative team, writer Chris Claremont and artist/co-writer Alan Davis, incorporated elements of two Marvel properties: the X-Men and Captain Britain.

The X-Men are a group of mutants—evolved human beings born with extraordinary powers—who use their abilities to defend a society that both hates and fears them. Claremont had authored their series since 1976, guiding them to tremendous success. He borrowed four characters from the X-Men, who formed the team under the mistaken impression that their fellow X-Men were dead:

- Nightcrawler (Kurt Wagner) – a German mutant who possesses the ability to teleport, becomes nearly invisible in shadows, and has a demon-like appearance.
- Phoenix (Rachel Summers) – a telekinetic and telepathic young woman from a dystopian future. She plays host to the Phoenix Force, a powerful cosmic entity which once posed as her mother, Jean Grey.
- Shadowcat (Kitty Pryde) – A teenage computer expert with the ability to "phase" through solid objects.
- Lockheed – A small dragon-like alien and Kitty's pet.

A Marvel UK property, co-created by Claremont in 1976, Captain Britain is a protector of Great Britain, endowed with superhuman powers by the legendary wizard, Merlyn. Alan Davis and Alan Moore, during their joint early-1980s stint, established that the Marvel Universe's Captain Britain was one of many from various dimensions and that one of his main roles is guarding the lighthouse that is placed at the convergence of realities.

Excalibur, which also featured shapeshifter Meggan, first gathered together in Excalibur Special Edition #1 (1988) and were soon featured in a monthly Excalibur series. With the help of a manic, dimension-hopping robot named Widget, they embarked on a series of adventures through parallel worlds.

Claremont left with Excalibur #34 (1991). Beginning with Excalibur #42, Davis returned to the series, this time as both writer and penciller, and resolved many plotlines that Claremont had left unconcluded. He also added several new members, including the mystic Feron, the warrior Kylun, and the alien Cerise; and also introduced the size-shifter Micromax. (In an interview in Wizard #6, Davis said that he was adding four new team members to the team. Presumably, if Davis' run had not ended prematurely, Micromax would have become a full member of the team during Davis' tenure, rather than the start of Lobdell's.)

In a jarring transition, Captain Britain was lost off-panel, Meggan was suddenly catatonic from losing him, and the newer members were summarily dispatched. Marvel stationed the team on Muir Island, off the coast of Scotland, and tied the series closer to the X-Men mythos, casting off most Captain Britain-related elements, in addition to the characters that did not have close ties to the X-Universe, like Kylun and Feron. Phoenix was written out and, when Captain Britain returned, he began using the alias "Britannic". Lobdell also introduced Douglock, an amalgam of two previously deceased members of the New Mutants: the techno-organic alien Warlock and the linguistic savant Cypher. Nightcrawler's former lover, the mystic Amanda Sefton, also joined the team, using the codename Daytripper.

Revisions made under Warren Ellis included reverting Britannic back to Captain Britain and adding Pete Wisdom, a cynical British spy who could manifest solar energy in the form of "hot knives" that could be shot out from his fingers. Ellis also developed a romantic relationship between Wisdom and Shadowcat. At the insistence of Marvel editors, Ellis also added Wolfsbane, a Scottish werewolf-like young woman from the New Mutants and X-Factor, and Colossus, the Russian X-Man who can turn his flesh into organic steel; the latter's inclusion introduced a love triangle angle between him, Wisdom and Kitty, who had turned to Wisdom in the wake of Colossus' estrangement after he had joined Magneto's Acolytes.

Sales fell and Marvel canceled the series, partially so Nightcrawler, Shadowcat, and Colossus could return to the X-Men. The series ended with issue #125 (1998), featuring the wedding of Meggan and a de-powered Captain Britain.

== Excalibur (vol. 2): 2001 ==
In 2001, a four-issue limited series titled Excalibur, featuring Captain Britain, Meggan, Psylocke, the Black Knight, Sir Benedict, Captain U.K., and Crusader X, detailed Captain Britain's rise to become king of the extra-dimensional realm of Otherworld.

The solicited cover to issue #1 featured a new costume for Captain Britain that was different from the one that he actually received in the comic, but the cover was unused.

== Excalibur (vol. 3): 2004 ==
In 2004, Marvel Comics launched a new ongoing series titled Excalibur, this time dealing with the efforts of Professor Xavier and Magneto to rebuild the devastated mutant nation of Genosha (which was destroyed at the beginning of Grant Morrison's New X-Men).

Other cast members included Callisto, another mutant leader and former member of the Morlocks, and newcomers such as Wicked, Freakshow, Shola Inkosi, and Karima Shapandar. Archangel and Husk also appeared in the series. The grouping never laid claim to the name Excalibur, despite the title of the series. The series' last issue was #14, released in May, 2005. Events of the "House of M" storyline concluded Xavier's and Magneto's partnership. Afterward, the mutant members of the group showed up in the "Son of M" series, where it was revealed they had all lost their powers due to the "Decimation". However, they used Quicksilver's stolen Terrigen Mist to bring their powers back, which caused them to go out of control, but the effect wore off later, leaving them human. Ironically, issues of Uncanny X-Men during the time of this Excalibur had much in common with the original Excalibur: lighthearted stories by Chris Claremont, colorful art by Alan Davis and Mark Farmer, characters including Nightcrawler and Rachel Summers, and even a cameo appearance by Captain Britain.

Genoshan Excalibur
Character	Real name	Active in
Magneto	Max "Magnus" Eisenhardt	Excalibur, vol. 3 #2 (2004)
Professor X	Charles Francis Xavier	Excalibur, vol. 3 #2 (2004)
Callisto		Excalibur, vol. 3 #2 (2004)
Freakshow		Excalibur, vol. 3 #2 (2004)
Wicked		Excalibur, vol. 3 #2 (2004)
Karima Shapandar		Excalibur, vol. 3 #4 (2004)
Shola Inkose		Excalibur, vol. 3 #4 (2004)
Book		Excalibur, vol. 3 #8 (2004)
Broadband		Excalibur, vol. 3 #8 (2004)
Hub		Excalibur, vol. 3 #9 (2004)
Dark Beast	Henry Philip McCoy (Earth-295)	Excalibur, vol. 3 #10 (2004)

== New Excalibur (2005–2007) ==
The letters page of the final issue of Excalibur (vol. 3) announced a relaunch of the title as New Excalibur in November, 2005. This incarnation of the book was written by Claremont. New Excalibur has more in common with the original series than the Genosha-based book had, for it features Captain Britain and Peter Wisdom as main characters and takes place in London. Other characters include the reformed villain-turned-X-Man the Juggernaut, the former X-Women Sage and Dazzler, and Nocturne, formerly of the Exiles.

As with many of Marvel's late 2005 books, it spun out of the after-effects of "House of M". Four issues of Uncanny X-Men laid the foundation for New Excalibur. Captain Britain brought the team together in New Excalibur #5, preceding an attack from Lionheart, Albion, and the Warwolves. Later, the team faced an attack by Black Air and Black Tom Cassidy, who was depowered due to "M-Day." Black Air retreated after the Dazzler, Wisdom, Nocturne, and Captain Britain trounced them. Black Tom surrendered after the Juggernaut talked him down and made him feel guilty about killing the Juggernaut's friend, Sammy Paré / Squidboy. Sage confronted the Dark Charles Xavier from Shadow-X in an astral fight, where Sage shot his astral form and won.

Psylocke joins New Excalibur and assisted them during an attack by the Shadow King, who was responsible for the creation of Shadow-X. Psylocke plunged a psi-blade into Dark Xavier, saved New Excalibur, and vanished in a flash of light. Captain Britain believes her to be dead, unaware that she has joined the Exiles. Since the incident with Psylocke, New Excalibur has met up with a repowered Chamber, visited and saved Camelot (while the Black Knight temporarily traveled with them), and have attempted to help the Juggernaut with some troubles stemming from his powers that he received from the Crimson Gem of Cyttorak. Nocturne had a stroke and the team is trying to help her recover.

Later on, Albion tells his story to Lionheart. He is a Brian Braddock from another world, where their first World War never ended and he chose the sword over the amulet. He brought his world peace, but people kept starving and dying. When he met an alternate Captain Britain, he moved onto the latter's world and from there began a killing spree on the Captain Britain Corps. He then meets Shadow-X and Michelle Scicluna, a Black Air agent, and they prepare to take on New Excalibur. Rivalry sets them apart, though, and Sage infiltrates them as Diana Fox. Albion manages to take down all of England's energy-using objects and conquers it, with Sage developing a new persona subordinate to him. They kill both Dark Cyclops and Dark Beast, forcing New Excalibur and Shadow-X to ally to make what might be their last stand. Dark Marvel Girl, Juggernaut, and Dark Angel create a diversion, at the cost of the latter's life, to allow the Dazzler, the Dark Iceman, and Pete Wisdom to combine their powers and blind all of the Captains while Nocturne, who has left the hospital while possessing a Captain's body, evacuates the civilians. Captain Britain arrives to face Albion and tries to bring Sage back to normal and the two Brian Braddocks prepare to face off. Captain Britain then defeats Albion, as Dark Marvel Girl finds the device that Albion had used and is able to reactivate all of the technology in Great Britain.

New Excalibur #24 was the final issue of this title, with the storylines carrying over into the crossover miniseries X-Men: Die by the Sword.

=== X-Men: Die by the Sword ===
Psylocke and Thunderbird travel to Earth-616 to visit Captain Britain and Nocturne during New Excalibur's victory party. During the party, however, Captain Britain is wounded by a strike force led by an armored lady called Rouge-Mort. While Psylocke tries to care for her brother, everybody else tries to fight. Realizing that they cannot win, they teleport to the Panoptichron. There, the Dazzler discovers that Longshot, while alive, does not remember her and is about to kill herself to ease her pain when Mystique comes to talk her out of it. Nocturne happily reunites with her former teammates, while Sage is deemed the best option to care for Captain Britain. Meanwhile, Cat, using the scanner, realizes that Roma and Saturnyne are in trouble. The Corps then suffers a lot of losses, despite Saturnyne's intervening. While Cat checks on Brian, Blink, Morph, Sabretooth, Thunderbird, and Dazzler join the battlefield. The Dazzler battles Rouge-Mort, who has badly wounded Roma, while Morph battles James Jaspers by transforming into Fury, but his plan is quickly foiled. Sage, Psylocke, and Wisdom recruit Albion to their cause, who proves to be a match for James Jaspers until Jaspers turns into the Fury. Merlyn then comes to his daughter to finish the job, only to be beaten by Psylocke. Captain Britain then makes his move on the Fury and, with the help of Blink and Albion, vanquishes him for now, leading to Merlyn's defeat. However, this victory comes with a price as Roma dies, though not before transferring her knowledge into Sage's mind. Saturnyne then promises to free Albion from jail to lead the Corps, while Sage and Nocturne switch teams with Longshot, who now remembers the highlights of his past. New Excalibur, now with only four members, disbands after the final battle with Merlyn.

== Excalibur (vol. 4): 2019 ==
Excalibur was relaunched as a part of Dawn of X in October 2019. The initial roster included Betsy Braddock as the new Captain Britain, Gambit, Rogue, Jubilee, Rictor and Apocalypse.

Betsy Braddock, returned to her original body, has spent time reconnecting with her brother Captain Britain and his wife Meggan. Although she is excited to move to Krakoa, Betsy is hesitant to use the Psylocke codename and actively avoids Kwannon, whose body she had taken over for many years. Egg informs her that he and the rest of The Five have resurrected her brother Jamie although she is reluctant to let him back into her life. Apocalypse informs her that a new Krakoan gateway has appeared but it is being blocked from the other side. As the gate leads to Avalon, one of the kingdoms of Otherworld, he requests that she speak with Captain Britain and use his amulet to travel there and investigate. Betsy and Britain travel to Camelot and are confronted by Morgan le Fay, who is trying to work out why the gate has appeared as it is siphoning her magic. Believing it to be the fault of Earth's mages, she attacks Betsy, taking control of Captain Britain to do so though Betsy escapes using the amulet. On Krakoa, Apocalypse summons Rogue, Gambit and Jubilee, informing them of the situation and uses Rogue's powers to weaken the gate enough for it to be destroyed. However, the resulting magical explosion encases her in a flower coffin. Betsy takes Rogue, Gambit and Jubilee to the older Excalibur lighthouse but finds that Morgan has burned it down. Rogue's flowers make her an extension of Krakoa and a new lighthouse made of plants is constructed, with Rogue as its light. Mages from Clan Akkaba, those misguidedly loyal to Apocalypse, attack the lighthouse but Excalibur fight them off. Despite the protests of the others, Apocalypse arrives and promises to protect Rogue while the others head to Camelot to rescue Captain Britain however, Morgan's forces are too powerful and they have to retreat, leading Betsy to take up the mantle of Captain Britain until she can free her brother. Apocalypse finds Rictor, who has lost control of his powers, and convinces him to come to Krakoa.

Apocalypse sends Gambit and Rictor underground to steal magic-infused crystals while, unbeknownst to Apocalypse, Prestige (at Gambit's request) telepathically infiltrates Rogue's mind and helps to free her. Apocalypse is enraged when he finds out Rogue has been awoken prematurely as this interferes with his plans. As revenge, Rogue kills Apocalypse, who is later resurrected on Krakoa by the Five and arrives in Camelot to convince Morgan le Fay to allow them to settle their grievances with a duel between Captain Britain and her brother. When Betsy defeats Brian, Apocalypse reveals that he has crowned Jamie as King and Morgan is taken away to be experimented on by Apocalypse. Brian, freed from Morgan's control finds that he is no longer fit to be Captain Britain and officially bequeaths the title to Betsy. Apocalypse and Exodus request that Excalibur obtain warwolf heads as they have magical qualities, leading the team into conflict with Cullen Bloodstone, who is also hunting them. Apocalypse tasks Excalibur with planting a gateway in the Starlight Citadel, which brings them into conflict with Lady Saturnyne, who refuses to accept Betsy as the new Captain Britain. Gamits steals a gem from the Citadel which houses the life force of Candra but does not tell Rogue. Candra warns Gambit that Apocalypse is planning something and begs him not to give her gem to him, though Gambit refuses and throws it into the gateway. Apocalypse gathers the Externals tells them that they are obsolete, as all mutants now have the ability to be resurrected, and teams up with Rictor, Selene, Gideon and Absalom to kill the other Externals so that their life forces can be used as fuel to power the gate via a magical ritual.

During the X of Swords event, Apocalypse reveals that his motives for powering the External Gate was so that he could reach Arakko, an island that was once part of Krakoa, where his wife Genesis and their children, his original Four Horsemen have been trapped thousands of years fighting demons. He takes Summoner, Banshee, and Unus the Untouchable with him through the gate to Otherworld but they are betrayed when Summoner reveals himself as the son of War and the Horsemen attack, gravely injuring Apocalypse and Banshee while capturing Unus. A rescue mission similarly goes awry but the fighting is stopped by Saturnyne, who declares that a tournament be held between the champions of Krakoa and Arakko in order to avoid all-out war which could potentially destabilize Otherworld, of which she is regent. As the champions search for their prophesied weapons, the Braddock siblings visit the Citadel to retrieve the Starlight Sword. During their search, Saturnyne expresses her hatred for Betsy, locks her in prison and states that she is unworthy to be Captain Britain because she did not have to choose between the amulet and the sword as is tradition because she was simply given it by Brian back in Avalon. Jamie frees Betsy and they go to Saturnyne's chambers, where Brian seduces her, distracting her long enough for Betsy to claim the Starlight Sword. As revenge, Saturnyne declares that the first fight during the tournament is between Betsy and Isca the Unbeaten, an Arakki mutant with the power to never lose. When Betsy attempts to parry one of Isca's attacks, the Starlight Sword shatters immediately and so does Betsy, who is presumed dead. Saturnyne takes the pieces to her chambers and uses them to revive the Captain Britain Corps but is distraught when they are all made in Betsy's image rather than Brian's. Following the conclusion of the tournament, Apocalypse returns to Arakko with his family.

Following the departure of Apocalypse and the death of Betsy, the rest of Excalibur are lost and unsure of what to do next. Rogue and Gambit submit a request to X-Factor to have Betsy resurrected but Northstar and Prestige state that there is no way to know whether Betsy died during the fight with Isca or not and therefore won't risk reviving her, much to the team's frustration. They head to Avalon, where Brian has taken on the mantle of Captain Avalon and works as the protector of Jamie's throne. Meggan volunteers to accompany them into Otherworld to see if Betsy is still alive while Jamie secretly makes a deal with Mister Sinister to create a clone of Betsy. In an alternate timeline, Betsy awakens and finds that has taken the place of Queen Elizabeth III, with Angel as her secret lover. She explains to him that she needs to return to her original universe and Angel states that his ex-wife, Kwannon, can help smuggle her to Otherworld. During the mission, Betsy tries to talk to Kwannon about their history in her timeline but Kwannon becomes angry and forces her through the portal. Excalibur team up with Pete Wisdom to defend the Lighthouse from Clan Akkaba, who have turned the British people against Betsy, a mutant Captain Britain who abandoned them for Krakoa. Betsy returns but isolates herself, refusing to talk to anyone, leading Rogue to suspect that she is not their original Betsy. Emma Frost arrives and declares that the Krakoan Council attempted to arrange an audience with Saturnyne but, as they did not have a Captain Britain to represent them, their request was refused but, now that Betsy is back, she must do her job. Rogue and Rictor go to Apocalypse's old lab to look for answers, where it is reveal that Apocalypse had left all of his magical research to Rictor. They are attacked by Betsy but saved by Kwannon, who declares that is not the real Betsy Braddock.

Other members of the Captain Britain Corps attempt to search for Betsy until one of them, Elspeth Braddock, finally locates her consciousness and traps it in a lamp. She, along with Queen Elizabeth III who has been returned to her body, and the rest of the Corps, go to the Citadel to get Saturnyne to revive Betsy but she outright refuses. Excalibur use Jamie's clone of Betsy and one of Apocalypse's rituals to try to bring Betsy back to life but the spell doesn't work. Kwannon releases Betsy's consciousness and uses the connection between them to track it down in Otherworld. Betsy and Kwannon have a psychic battle where they reconcile their past and Kwannon temporarily acts as the host for Betsy's consciousness until she returns it to the clone body, reviving her. Rogue then reveals that she knows who the fake Betsy was: Malice, who is now loose in Krakoa.

During the Hellfire Gala, Betsy attends a meeting with Professor X, Emma Frost and the UK ambassador, who is secretly a member of Clan Akkaba. He expresses his dislike for a mutant Captain Britain and announces that the UK will no longer be an ally of Krakoa. Rictor is sent into a spiral when Shatterstar appears and tries to reconnect, causing him to cleave the piece of land where the Lighthouse stands into a new island off the coast of the UK. Clan Akkaba murders Pete Wisdom in order to fully revive Morgan le Fay.

== Excalibur members ==
Character	Real name	Joined in
Captain Britain	Brian Braddock	Excalibur: The Sword is Drawn (1987)
Meggan	Meggan Braddock	Excalibur: The Sword is Drawn (1987)
Phoenix	Rachel Summers	Excalibur: The Sword is Drawn (1987)
Nightcrawler	Kurt Wagner	Excalibur: The Sword is Drawn (1987)
Shadowcat	Katherine Pryde	Excalibur: The Sword is Drawn (1987)
Lockheed		Excalibur: The Sword is Drawn (1987)
Recruits
Widget	Kate Rasputina	Excalibur, Vol. 1 #1 (1988)
Kylun	Colin McKay	Excalibur, Vol. 1 #46 (1992)
Cerise		Excalibur, Vol. 1 #47 (1992)
Feron		Excalibur, Vol. 1 #49 (1992)
Micromax	Scott Wright	Excalibur, Vol. 1 #68 (1993)
Dr. MacTaggert	Moira Kinross MacTaggert	Excalibur, Vol. 1 #71 (1993)
Daytripper	Amanda Sefton/Jimaine Szardos	Excalibur, Vol. 1 #75 (1994)
Douglock	Warlock	Excalibur, Vol. 1 #78 (1994)
Wolfsbane	Rahne Sinclair	Excalibur, Vol. 1 #90 (1995)
Wisdom	Peter Paul Wisdom	Excalibur, Vol. 1 #91 (1995)
Colossus	Piotr "Peter" Rasputin	Excalibur, Vol. 1 #92 (1995)
Excalibur: Sword of Power
Captain Britain	Brian Braddock	Excalibur, vol. 2 #1 (2001)
Meggan	Meggan Braddock	Excalibur, vol. 2 #1 (2001)
Psylocke	Elizabeth "Betsy" Braddock	Excalibur, vol. 2 #1 (2001)
Black Knight	Dane Whitman	Excalibur, vol. 2 #1 (2001)
Captain UK	Linda McQuillan	Excalibur, vol. 2 #1 (2001)
Crusader X	Bran Braddock	Excalibur, vol. 2 #1 (2001)
Sir Benedict		Excalibur, vol. 2 #1 (2001)
New Excalibur
Captain Britain	Brian Braddock	New Excalibur #5 (2006)
Dazzler	Alison Blaire	New Excalibur #5 (2006)
Sage	Teresia Karisik	New Excalibur #5 (2006)
Wisdom	Peter Paul Wisdom	New Excalibur #3 (2006)
Nocturne	Talia Josephine "T.J." Wagner	New Excalibur #3 (2006)
Juggernaut	Cain Marko	New Excalibur #4 (2006)
Lionheart	Kelsey Kirkland Leigh	New Excalibur #4 (2006)
Longshot		X-Men: Die by the Sword #5 (2007).
Excalibur (2019)
Captain Britain	Elizabeth "Betsy" Braddock	Excalibur, vol. 4 (2019)
Gambit	Remy Etienne LeBeau	Excalibur, vol. 4 (2019)
Rogue	Anna Marie LeBeau	Excalibur, vol. 4 (2019)
Jubilee	Jubilation Lee	Excalibur, vol. 4 (2019)
Rictor	Julio Esteban Richter	Excalibur, vol. 4 (2019)
Apocalypse	En Sabah Nur	Excalibur, vol. 4 (2019)
Monarch	Jamie Braddock	Excalibur, vol. 4 #24 (2021)
Captain Avalon	Brian Braddock	Excalibur, vol. 4 #25 (2021)
Meggan / Gloriana	Meggan Braddock	Excalibur, vol. 4 #25 (2021)
Shatterstar	Gaveedra-Seven	Excalibur, vol. 4 #25 (2021)
Bei the Blood Moon	Bei	Excalibur, vol. 4 #25 (2021)
Allies
Roma		Excalibur Special Edition, Vol. 1 #1 (1988)
Detective Dai Thomas		Excalibur, Vol. 1 #1 (1988)
Alysande Stuart		Excalibur, Vol. 1 #6 (1989)
Alistaire Stuart		Excalibur, Vol. 1 #6 (1989)
Banshee	Sean Cassidy	Uncanny X-Men, Vol. 1 #254 (1989)
Ahab	Roderick "Rory" Campbell	Excalibur, Vol. 1 #72 (1993)
Mimic	Calvin Rankin	Excalibur, Vol. 1 #123 (1998)
Strider		Excalibur, Vol. 2 #2 (2001)
Shogo	Shogo Lee	Excalibur, Vol. 4 #2 (2020)

== Other versions ==
=== Lightning Force (Earth-597) ===
From an alternate Earth where the Nazis have won World War II, and led by Hauptmann Englande, the Lightning Force team consists of Meggan, Shadowcat, and Nightcrawler. The team first appeared in Excalibur #9.

=== European Defense Initiative (Ultimate Marvel) ===
In the Ultimate Marvel universe, the European Union Super Soldier Program owns a team of superheroes named the EDI (European Defense Initiative) which is also codenamed Excalibur. It is the European equivalent to America's Ultimates. They first appear in The Ultimates 2 and are involved in the origins of Thor. They aid the Ultimates in defeating the Liberators in New York. Captains France, Captain Italy, Captain Spain and the new Captain Britain reside there. The now-villainous Reed Richards-led Children of Tomorrow killed Captains Italy and France, with Spain and Britain remaining. Britain then joined the Ultimates.

=== Calibur (Earth-924) ===
Led by Cap'n Saxonia, the team consists of the Hulk, Spider-Girl, Doctor Strange, and Iron Fist. The team first appeared in Excalibur #49.

=== Excalibur (Earth-148) ===
Led by Yeoman UK (Brion Burdack), the Excalibur of Ee'rath featured versions of Thor, the Black Knight, and Spider-Man. The team first appeared in Excalibur #1.

=== Excalibur (Earth-99476) ===
The Griswald family accidentally fall through a portal and end up in Earth-99476, where the dinosaurs never died out. The Britainicus Rex and his Excalibur-equivalent team of that world are able to help them return to Earth-616. They also have a short battle with a dinosaur version of the Fantastic Five, with Saur Fantastic, the Invisiguanadon, the Dinotorch, a green hairy Thing, and Arachnosaur.
