= Excalibur (comic book) =

Comic book series

- Excalibur Vol. 1 #-1 (May 1997). Art by Dave Cockrum and Casey Jones.
- Created by: Chris Claremont; Alan Davis

Publication information
- Publisher: Marvel Comics
- Schedule: Monthly
- Title(s): Excalibur Special Edition (1987); Excalibur (vol. 1) #1–125 (1988–1998); Excalibur: Mojo Mayhem (1989); Excalibur: Weird War IIII (1990); Excalibur - The Possession (1991); Excalibur: XX Crossing (1992); Excalibur (vol. 2) #1–4 (2001); Excalibur (vol. 3) #1–14 (2005–2006); New Excalibur #1–24 (2006–2007); Excalibur (vol. 4) #1–26 (2019–2022)
- Formats: Varied
- Genre: Superhero
- Publication date: 1987–2022
- Main character(s): Excalibur

Excalibur is the name of several superhero comic books published by Marvel Comics since 1988, generally featuring the team of the same name.

The first volumes ran for 125 issues, complemented by several one-shot special editions, between 1987 and 1998. The second was a four-issue limited series published in 2001, and the third an ongoing series printed from 2004 and 2005 before being relaunched as New Excalibur. While featuring some of the same characters and concepts, the second and third series did not centre on an Excalibur team. The 2019 series, complete with the return of the eponymous team, was revived as part of the Dawn of X X-Men relaunch.

== Creation ==
The genesis of Excalibur came from Captain Britain, an initially unsuccessful attempt by Marvel to break into the British market which was co-created by American staff, including Chris Claremont. Since creating Captain Britain, Claremont's career had gone from strength to strength; Uncanny X-Men had become one of the industry's best-selling titles, and as a result he had set up spin-off New Mutants, which was itself followed by the successful X-Factor. Meanwhile the short-lived Captain Britain had been revived by British creative teams, receiving critical acclaim - albeit while struggling for sales. When Claremont read the reinvigorated Captain Britain stories he was impressed with the development of the characters and immediately planned a sequel to the Alan Moore-penned "Jaspers' Warp" arc, featuring Mad Jim Jaspers, the Fury and the rest of the Captain Britain cast that would be a major X-Men plot arc. Betsy Braddock, the title character's sister, was featured in New Mutants Annual #2 in 1986, soon joining the X-Men as Psylocke, while Jaspers made what was planned to be a teaser appearance in Uncanny X-Men #200, with the plot line of Charles Xavier's exile to the Shi'ar Empire intended to serve as a catalyst. However Claremont was then made aware of an ownership debate between Moore and Marvel, and with the publisher wary of litigation from Moore the storyline was retooled. The Jaspers cameo - during which the character had not demonstrated his powers - was not followed up on, while the role intended for the Fury was instead filled by new character Nimrod. Some of the planned storylines would later be used for the X-Men arc "Fall of the Mutants".

Meanwhile while plot-lines in Uncanny X-Men had seen the popular characters Nightcrawler, Shadowcat and Colossus - as well as the Rachel Summers incarnation of Phoenix - sidelined. The new roster featuring Havok, Longshot and Dazzler proved popular and were central to Claremont's plans for the series, so Marvel wanted both a 'home' for the characters and the sales potential of a fourth X-Men book. At the time, Marvel were heavily courting Alan Davis, who had been artist for Captain Britain from 1981 and was an avowed fan of the character. After winning considerable acclaim in Britain, he was head-hunted by DC Comics, again receiving praise for his work on Batman and the Outsiders before falling out with the company. As a result, Marvel gave Davis what was for the time a very generous contract, both in terms of remuneration and creative freedom. Claremont was assigned to write the series, but allowed Davis - more used to working via the full script process rather than the 'Marvel method' considerable leeway and input. Claremont had previously wanted Davis to draw Uncanny X-Men; according to the writer the post was never available at the same time as Davis was, but the artist would later indicate he was uninterested. Ann Nocenti was given the post of editor, and the trio decided the book would be a "cosmic comedy", both to play to Davis' strengths and to offset the dark tone of the other mutant books. Claremont chose to return Colossus to Uncanny X-Men rather than use him for Excalibur, due to Captain Britain already fulfilling the team's need for a strongman type. Davis' regular collaborator Paul Neary also joined as inker.

== Publication history ==
=== Volume 1 (1987–1998) ===
Excalibur
- The cover to Excalibur (Vol.1) #1, art by Alan Davis

Publication information
- Publisher: Marvel Comics
- Schedule: Monthly
- Format: Ongoing series
- Genre: Superhero
- Publication date: October 1988 – October 1998
- No. of issues: 125 + 5 Special editions
- Main character: Excalibur

Creative team
- Written by: Chris Claremont; Scott Lobdell; Alan Davis; Warren Ellis; Ben Raab et al.
- Penciller(s): Alan Davis; Carlos Pacheco; Salvador Larroca et al.
- Inker(s): Paul Neary; Mark Farmer et al.

==== Chris Claremont and Alan Davis ====
The series was launched with the lavish Excalibur Special Edition, a 1987 48-page advertisement-free 'bookshelf' comic promoted with posters and promotional carrier bags for comic stories. It was followed by an ongoing series. Despite being priced higher than most of Marvel's regular titles due to using a more expensive paper stock, Excalibur was a strong sales success - #1 was Diamond Comic Distributors' best-selling title for April 1988, with #2 second-best behind the first issue of the newly-launched Wolverine in May and #3 third behind Wolverine and Uncanny X-Men in June. With the creators given a large amount of freedom by Marvel, the series soon received plaudits for its humorous tone and wit compared to the darker turn taken by both the other X-Men related titles and the wider industry at the time. The success also led to Marvel printing a trade paperback compiling the material Davis had produced for Captain Britain, which was coloured by several artists. Davis and writer Jamie Delano were required to sell their rights to the material to do so; as Alan Moore refused to do likewise, his work on the title was not included in the collection.

While Claremont and Davis intended Excalibur not to cross over with the other X-Men titles, the series was broadly part of the 1989 "Inferno" event, with issues #6-7. However, Excalibur themselves were only peripherally involved in the events of the story, not encountering any of the major characters. Due to Davis falling behind schedule, issue #8 saw Ron Lim guest as artist, while #11 featured Marshall Rogers. A second special edition - Excalibur - Mojo Mayhem - was also published, featuring art from Art Adams. Excalibur #12 began the "Cross-Time Caper", a planned 9-issue arc sending the characters to a wide variety of alternative Earths. The following issue saw the debut of a new costume for Captain Britain; it had been designed for the character's primarily black-and-white British appearances, but Davis found the American colourists were frequently making mistakes and so simplified it. However, in 1990 and partway through the storyline Davis fell ill. After a fill-in issue written by Michael Higgins and drawn by Lim, Chris Wozniak provided art until Davis was fit to return on Excalibur #23. However, his return would only last for two issues - after completing the delayed "Cross-Time Caper" arc he left the title, later stating that he was unhappy with the effect compromises he was having to make to get back on schedule were having on the quality of his work.

==== Claremont and others ====
Soon after Davis' departure, Claremont's attention was split by the need to focus on the planned relaunch of X-Men. Other writers including Higgins, Terry Austin, Dana Moreshead and Scott Lobdell contributed issues, particularly when the title went bi-weekly over the summer of 1990. The book was also without a regular artist, instead featuring guest artists such as Barry Windsor-Smith, Colleen Doran, and David Ross. By this point sales had fallen; while still healthy they would never reach the heights of the early issues. Following the three-part "Girls' School from Heck" storyline (with art by Ron Wagner) in #32-34, Claremont left the title. A third special edition, Weird War III, was released in 1991.

==== Alan Davis returns ====
Claremont's replacement was meant to be a returning Alan Davis, tempted back as writer-artist from #35 onwards. However, other commitments delayed his return and Lobdell contributed a short run to bridge the gap, including a three-part arc featuring the Avengers West Coast; the events of his stories were guided by Davis. As Neary had decided to continue his more lucrative pencilling career, Davis linked up with Mark Farmer as inker - the pair had briefly worked together before, notably on the final issue of Captain Britain, and would go on to have a long partnership. They appeared as the new team on Excalibur #42; while contemporary Marvel policy did not generally tout creative teams on covers, the issue bore a strapline trumpeting the return of "You Know Who". Davis' double role also meant he could plot issues for other artists to draw when he fell behind schedule. His return allowed the conclusion of numerous unresolved plot-lines and saw the first major expansion to the comic's regular cast with the additions of Cerise, Kylun, Micromax and Feron. Having concluded his storylines, Davis left again after Excalibur #67 to focus on launching the ClanDestine. Comic Book Resources suggested the title never recovered from Davis' departure.

==== Scott Lobdell ====
Davis' return had not brought the expected sales increase; subsequently, after a brief tenure under Brian Ashford, the title would take a different direction under Scott Lobdell, who strengthened the title's narrative and tonal connection to the other X-Men titles under the direction of Bob Harras. The recent additions to the cast were abruptly written out, as was Captain Britain - who became lost in the time-steam off-panel before Excalibur #68, leading to Meggan also falling out of focus. The cosmic elements of the book were dropped and the team were relocated to Muir Island, with Moira MacTaggert added to the regular cast. While Captain Britain would return to the series it was at the expense of Phoenix, and he was radically altered to the aloof Britannic, and he and Meggan would take a minor role in the series, which increasingly focused on Nightcrawler, Shadowcat and MacTaggert, as well as the newly added extant X-Men supporting character Amanda Sefton. The new strategy for the title also saw it involved in the crossovers "Fatal Attractions" and "Phalanx Covenant"; the latter saw Douglock added to the regular cast. However, sales only rose slightly.

==== Warren Ellis ====
In late 1994 Warren Ellis - recently of Hellstorm - took over as writer from Excalibur #82. After three issues working from a plot by Lobdell he made his debut as sole writer with Excalibur #85. The following issue saw the introduction of Pete Wisdom to the series. Wisdom had originally been planned as a character in Ellis' projected Trident Comics series Electric Angel, but only got as far as the ashcan stage. To avoid any possible legal worries over this, Ellis simply didn't tell Marvel about the character's origins. After #86 the series was replaced for four months by the limited series X-Calibre as part of the "Age of Apocalypse" X-Men event. Marvel also directed Ellis to add Wolfsbane and Colossus to the title. Initially several artists worked on the title, including Ken Lashley and Casey Jones, before Carlos Pacheco took over from #95. Ellis would also pen the three-issue spin-off limited series Pryde and Wisdom. Excalibur #100 saw Brian Braddock return to the role of Captain Britain; however, Ellis would leave the title a few issues later to work on WildStorm's Stormwatch and Dv8. His work on the series has received a generally positive reception.

==== Ben Raab and Salvador Larocca ====
From Excalibur #106 Ben Raab became writer, with Salvador Larroca as artist. Raab swiftly wrote out Captain Britain to facilitate a storyline featuring Colossus romancing Meggan, a plot point that would also feature in a Colossus one-shot. Raab would de-emphasise and eventually write out Wisdom too, once again choosing to focus on the X-Men originated characters. However, sales were poor and the title was finally cancelled after 125 issues in 1998. Critical reception of Raab's material has not been positive, with some feeling it had become a generic X-Men title that was going through the motions. Following the cancellation the characters of Nightcrawler, Shadowcat and Colossus returned to the main X-Men titles.

=== Volume 2 (2001) ===
Excalibur

Publication information
- Publisher: Marvel Comics
- Schedule: Monthly
- Format: Limited series
- Genre: Superhero
- Publication date: February 2001 – May 2001
- No. of issues: 4
- Main character(s): Captain Britain; Meggan; Psylocke; Black Knight

Creative team
- Written by: Ben Raab
- Penciller: Pablo Raimondi
- Inker: Walden Wong

The series returned as a four-issue limited series in 2001, again featuring Raab as writer with art from Pablo Raimondi. It was originally solicited as Excalibur - Sword of Power in 2000, but the final issues made no mention of the subtitle. The series did not feature an Excalibur team or all of the original cast, instead focusing on Captain Britain, Meggan, Psylocke and the Black Knight battling to save Otherworld.

=== Volume 3 (2004–2005) ===
Excalibur

Publication information
- Publisher: Marvel Comics
- Schedule: Monthly
- Format: Ongoing series
- Genre: Superhero
- Publication date: July 2004 – July 2005
- No. of issues: 14
- Main character(s): Professor X Magneto; Callisto

Creative team
- Written by: Chris Claremont
- Penciller: Aaron Lopresti
- Inker: Greg Adams

In 2004, Marvel launched a new ongoing series titled Excalibur as part of the X-Men Reload cross-line relaunch. Aside from the name and the writer (Claremont), it had no connection to Marvel's previous Excalibur titles, instead focusing on rebuilding efforts in Genosha and the relationship between Professor X and Magneto. The series' last issue was #14, released in May, 2005. The letters page of the final issue announced a relaunch of the title as New Excalibur in November, 2005.

=== New Excalibur (2006–2007) ===
New Excalibur

Publication information
- Publisher: Marvel Comics
- Schedule: Monthly
- Format: Ongoing series
- Genre: Superhero
- Publication date: January 2006 – December 2007
- No. of issues: 24
- Main character: Excalibur

Creative team
- Written by: Chris Claremont; Frank Tieri
- Penciller: Michael Ryan
- Inker: Rick Ketcham

The replacement title featured the return of an Excalibur team, consisting of Captain Britain, Pete Wisdom, Dazzler, Juggernaut, Nocturne and Sage. It was followed by X-Men: Die by the Sword.

=== Volume 4 (2019–2022) ===
Excalibur

Publication information
- Publisher: Marvel Comics
- Schedule: Monthly
- Genre: Superhero
- Publication date: December 2019 – February 2022
- No. of issues: 26
- Main character: Excalibur

Creative team
- Written by: Tini Howard
- Artist(s): Marcus To; Wilton Santos; R.B. Silva; Phil Noto; Mahmud Asrar; Stefano Caselli
- Colorist(s): Erick Arciniega; Nolan Woodward; Phil Noto; Sunny Gho; Rachelle Rosenberg
- Editor: Jordan D. White

Excalibur was relaunched as a part of Dawn of X in October 2019. The initial roster consisted of Betsy Braddock as the new Captain Britain, Gambit, Rogue, Jubilee, Rictor, and Apocalypse. After the final issue, the story continues in the Knights of X series, also written by Tini Howard.

== Collected editions ==
Title	Material collected	Publication date	ISBN
Excalibur Classic, Vol. 1 - The Sword is Drawn	Excalibur #1-5; Excalibur Special Edition	November 2005	978-0785118886
Excalibur Classic, Vol. 2 - Two-Edged Sword	Excalibur #6-11; Excalibur: Mojo Mayhem	August 2006	978-0785122012
Excalibur Classic, Vol. 3 - Cross Time Caper, Book 1	Excalibur #12-20	February 2007	978-0785122029
Excalibur Classic, Vol. 4 - Cross-Time Caper, Book 2	Excalibur #21-28	November 2007	978-0785122036
Excalibur Classic, Vol. 5	Excalibur #29-34; Excalibur: Weird War III	May 2008	978-0785131229
Excalibur Visionaries: Alan Davis, Vol. 1	Excalibur #42-50	June 2009	978-0785137405
Excalibur Visionaries: Alan Davis, Vol. 2	Excalibur #51-58; Excalibur: XX Crossing	February 2010	978-0785144557
Excalibur Visionaries: Alan Davis, Vol. 3	Excalibur #59-67	July 2011	978-0785155430
X-Men: Fatal Attractions	Excalibur, vol. 1 #71; X-Factor, vol. 1 #92; Uncanny X-Men #304; X-Men, vol. 2 #25; Wolverine, vol. 2 #75; and X-Force, vol. 1 #25	August 2000	0-7851-0748-7
X-Men: The Phalanx Covenant	Excalibur, vol. 1 #78-82; Uncanny X-Men #306, 311-314, 316–317; X-Men, vol. 2 #36–37; X-Factor, vol. 1 #106; X-Force, vol. 1 #38; Wolverine, vol. 2 #85; Cable, vol. 1 #16	February 2014	0-7851-8549-6
Origin of Generation X: Tales of the Phalanx Covenant	Excalibur, vol. 1 #82; Uncanny X-Men #316–317; X-Men, vol. 2 #36–37; X-Factor, vol. 1 #106; X-Force, vol. 1 #38; Wolverine, vol. 2 #85; Cable, vol. 1 #16; and Generation X #1	June 2001	0-7851-0216-7
Excalibur Visionaries: Warren Ellis, Vol. 1	Excalibur #83-90	May 2010	978-0785144564
Excalibur Visionaries: Warren Ellis, Vol. 2	Excalibur #91-95; X-Man #12; Starjammers vol.1, #1-4	August 2010	978-0785149293
Excalibur Visionaries: Warren Ellis, Vol. 3	Excalibur #96-103; Pryde and Wisdom #1-3	December 2010	978-0785149521
Excalibur: Forging the Sword	Excalibur vol. 3, #1-4	November 2004	978-0785115274
Excalibur: Saturday Night Fever	Excalibur vol. 3, #5-10	June 2005	978-0785114765
House of M: Excalibur - Prelude	Excalibur vol. 3, #11-14	August 2005	978-0785118121
New Excalibur: Defenders of the Realm	New Excalibur #1-7	August 2006	978-0785118350
New Excalibur: Last Days of Camelot	New Excalibur #8-15	March 2007	978-0785122210
New Excalibur: Battle for Eternity	New Excalibur #16-24	December 2007	978-0785124559
X-Men: Die by the Sword	X-Men: Die by the Sword #1-5	March 2008	978-0785127918
Excalibur by Tini Howard – Volume 1	Excalibur vol. 4, #1–6	April 22, 2020	ISBN 978-1302919917
Excalibur by Tini Howard – Volume 2	Excalibur vol. 4, #7–12	December 1, 2020	ISBN 978-1302921460
Excalibur by Tini Howard – Volume 3	Excalibur vol. 4, #16-21	September 15, 2021	ISBN 978-1302924843
Excalibur by Tini Howard – Volume 4	Excalibur vol. 4, #22-26	March 1, 2022	ISBN 978-1302927905

=== Epic Collections ===
Volume	Title	Material collected	Publication date	ISBN
1	Excalibur Epic Collection: The Sword is Drawn	Excalibur vol.1 #1–11; Excalibur Special Edition; Captain Britain (1976) #1–2; Excalibur: Mojo Mayhem; material from Mighty World of Marvel (vol. 2) #7, 14–15; Marvel Comics Presents (1988) #31–38	March 2017	978-1302904340
2	Excalibur Epic Collection: The Cross-Time Caper	Excalibur vol.1 #12–30	June 2018	978-1302910129
3	Excalibur Epic Collection: Girls' School From Heck	Excalibur vol.1 #31–41; Excalibur: Weird War III; Excalibur: The Possession; Excalibur: Air Apparent; Sensational She-Hulk #26; material from Marvel Comics Presents (1988) #75	February 2019	978-1302916527
4	Excalibur Epic Collection: Curiouser and Curiouser	Excalibur vol.1 #42–58; Excalibur: XX Crossing; material from Marvel Comics Presents (1988) #110	February 2020	978-1302922764
5	Excalibur Epic Collection: Days of Futures Yet to Come	Excalibur vol.1 #59-75, Annual #1	December 2024	978-1302959944
6	Excalibur Epic Collection: The Douglock Chronicles	Excalibur vol. 1 #76-87, Annual #2, X-Factor vol. 1 #106, X-Force vol. 1 #38, material from Marvel Comics Presents #174	October 2026	978-1302969479
8	Excalibur Epic Collection: The Battle for Britain	Excalibur vol. 1 #104-115, -1; Colossus (1997) #1; Kitty Pryde: Agent of S.H.I.E.L.D. #1-3; New Mutants: Truth or Death #1-3	March 2022	978-1302934460
9	Excalibur Epic Collection: You Are Cordially Invited	Excalibur vol. 1 #116-125; X-Men Unlimited #19; X-Men: True Friends #1-3; Excalibur vol. 2 #1-4	October 2023	978-1302953331

=== Omnibuses ===
Volume	Title	Material collected	Publication date	ISBN
1	Excalibur Omnibus Vol. 1	Excalibur vol.1 #1–34; Excalibur Special Edition; Excalibur: Mojo Mayhem; Quasar #11, Thor #427-429, material from Marvel Comics Presents (1988) #31–38	December 2020	978-1302904340
2	Excalibur Omnibus Vol. 2	Excalibur vol.1 #33-67; Excalibur: Weird War III, Excalibur: The Possession, Excalibur: Air Apparent, Excalibur: XX Crossing, Sensational She-Hulk #26; material from Marvel Comics Presents #75 and #110	February 2022	978-1302910129
3	Excalibur Omnibus Vol. 3	Excalibur vol.1 #68-103, Annual #1-2; Pryde & Wisdom #1-3; X-Factor #106; X-Force #38; X-Man #12; X-Men Unlimited #4, material from Marvel Comics Presents #174 and Marvel Holiday Special 1996	November 2023	
4	Excalibur Omnibus Vol. 4	Excalibur vol.1 #104-125; Colossus #1; New Mutants: Truth or Death #1-3; Kitty Pryde, Agent of S.H.I.E.L.D. #1-3; X-Men Unlimited #19; X-Men: True Friends #1-3; and Excalibur vol.2 #1-4	February 2026	978-1302965426
House of M Companion		Excalibur vol. 3 #8-14; New Avengers #16-20; House of M: Avengers #1-5; Civil War: House of M #1-5; House of M: Masters of Evil #1-4; What If? Spider-Man: House of M; House of M (2015) #1-4; material from What If?	December 2023	
