= Nightcrawler (character) =

Marvel Comics superhero

- Nightcrawler taken from the variant cover of Uncanny X-Men #9 (January 2025). Art by Mike Mayhew.

Publication information
- Publisher: Marvel Comics
- First appearance: Giant-Size X-Men #1 (May 1975)
- Created by: Dave Cockrum

In-story information
- Alter ego: Kurt Wagner
- Species: Human mutant
- Place of origin: Witzeldorf, Bavaria, Germany
- Team affiliations: X-Men; Excalibur; Quiet Council of Krakoa
- Abilities: Teleportation; Enhanced agility, flexibility, and night vision; Prehensile tail; Ability to cling to surfaces; Camouflage in shadows; Superb acrobat, fencer, and hand-to-hand combatant

Nightcrawler is a superhero appearing in American comic books published by Marvel Comics, commonly in association with the X-Men. Created by artist Dave Cockrum, he debuted in the comic book Giant-Size X-Men #1 (May 1975). By the time of his creation, there was already another Marvel character with the same name, but with a hyphen (Night-Crawler), which was later changed to Dark-Crawler to avoid confusion.

Nightcrawler, the superhero identity of Kurt Wagner, is a member of a fictional subspecies of humanity known as mutants, who possess an X-gene that can cause possible physical mutations and in many cases grants some form of superhuman ability. Nightcrawler possesses superhuman agility, the ability to teleport, and adhesive hands and feet. His physical mutations include indigo-colored velvety fur which allows him to become nearly invisible in shadows, two-toed feet and three-fingered hands, yellow eyes, pointed ears, and a prehensile tail. In Nightcrawler's earlier comic book appearances, he is depicted as being a happy-go-lucky practical joker and teaser, and a fan of swashbuckling fiction. Nightcrawler is a Catholic, and while this is not emphasized as much in his earlier comic book appearances, in later depictions he is more vocal about his faith. He was originally stated to be from the village of Witzeldorf in Bavaria.

In 1994, it was revealed that Nightcrawler was the son of mutant supervillain Mystique / Raven Darkhölme, and for many years after a 2003 storyline, it was believed that he was born out of her short affair with Azazel. 2023's X-Men Blue: Origins revealed that his parents were actually Mystique and her wife Destiny / Irene Adler.

Since his inception, Nightcrawler has had a regular presence in Marvel comic books. He has been featured in many video games and the animated television series X-Men (1992–1997), X-Men: Evolution (2000–2003), and Wolverine and the X-Men (2009). He was portrayed by Alan Cumming and Kodi Smit-McPhee in 20th Century Fox's X-Men film series (2003–2019), with Cumming set to reprise the role in the Marvel Cinematic Universe film Avengers: Doomsday (2026).

== Publication history ==
=== Creation ===
Dave Cockrum originally created Nightcrawler while he was in the United States Navy, stationed at Guam. He recounted: "I sat up one night in the middle of a typhoon because it was too noisy to sleep, so I stayed up and thought up this character. Originally, Nightcrawler was a demon from Hell who had flubbed a mission, and rather than go back and face punishment, he decided to stay up here in the human world. He was supposed to be the sidekick of another superhero character that I had created named The Intruder." At this point Nightcrawler wore trunks instead of a full costume, but otherwise looked identical to his final version.

Cockrum submitted the character to be part of a group of characters called The Outsiders (not to be confused with the later team The Outsiders), set in the universe of DC Comics' Legion of Super-Heroes series. However, DC rejected the character, resulting in Cockrum importing him to Marvel after he began working on The X-Men in 1975. Because editor Roy Thomas wanted the new X-Men to be a multinational group, it was decided to make Nightcrawler German.

=== 1970s-2000 ===
Nightcrawler's first solo story was published in Bizarre Adventures #27, cover dated July 1981; it was penciled by Cockrum and written by Jo Duffy. Although an X-Men character for years, Nightcrawler did not get his own comic book title (written and drawn by Cockrum) until November 1985. In the four-issue limited series Nightcrawler, along with Lockheed, Nightcrawler accidentally travels to several alternate dimensions, meeting strange beings such as the Boggies and Bamfs. The series was a lighthearted adventure saga with strong comedy elements, contrasting with The X-Men, where Nightcrawler was experiencing heavy angst and soul-searching at the time. It was largely a standalone work, with a cast dominated by new characters who were never used in later publications, and has the distinction of being the first Marvel comic printed on Baxter paper instead of newsprint.

In 1987, Nightcrawler became a founding member of Excalibur and a regular character in their ongoing series, while frequently returning to the X-Men.

=== 2000s-2010s ===
A second four-issue limited series was published in November 2002. Written by Chris Kipiniak and penciled by Matthew Dow Smith, it focuses upon Nightcrawler's decision to become a priest and his attempts to fight a group of slave traders.

In September 2004, the first Nightcrawler ongoing title was published by Marvel, written by Roberto Aguirre-Sacasa with covers and pencils by Darick Robertson. The series was canceled with issue twelve.

In 2014, a new Nightcrawler ongoing title commenced, written by Chris Claremont with art by Todd Nauck, picking up after the character's resurrection following his death in the 2010 "Second Coming" storyline. Claremont, who had written many of Nightcrawler's earlier adventures, described him as one of the least angst-ridden members of the X-Men and called him the team's "emotional/spiritual center," a friend the others turned to for both companionship and solutions to problems. He said the series would examine how Nightcrawler's death and resurrection had affected his Catholic faith, and structured its opening arc to reintroduce the character to readers who might be unfamiliar with him before broadening the story's scope. This was also canceled with issue twelve.

=== 2020s ===
Nightcrawler starred in an ongoing book titled Way of X, written by Si Spurrier and illustrated by Bob Quinn. It was announced in January 2021 for an April 2021 debut as part of the X-Men line's Reign of X, following the conclusion of X of Swords crossover. It is billed as a smart, psychedelic tale about faith, science, culture, love and law. In interviews promoting the series, Spurrier described its plot as following Nightcrawler's discovery that despair and violence were spreading through Krakoa's mutant population due to a hidden manipulator with ties to Professor X, leaving Nightcrawler and a team that included Dr. Nemesis, Pixie, and Blink to decide how to respond. He also connected the project to his earlier run on X-Men Legacy, in which he had explored mental illness through the X-Men's longstanding use as a metaphor for prejudice, an approach he said was among the most valuable work of his career. He structured the series around the Three Laws of Krakoa, with each issue addressing one of the laws as Nightcrawler searched for an idea capable of uniting Krakoa's population. Spurrier said the story was informed by Nightcrawler's Catholic faith, using the Krakoan practice of resurrection, including the lethal ritual known as Crucible, to raise questions about how that faith could be reconciled with sin, the nature of the soul, and what happens after death. He added that he intentionally avoided settling such metaphysical questions, since doing so risked contradicting the real-world religious beliefs of readers, and that the philosophy introduced in the series was meant to coexist with mutants' existing faiths rather than replace them. The series featured the return of Legion and the threat of Onslaught to the mutant nation.A one-shot titled X-Men: The Onslaught Revelation served as the finale of the first chapter of the series.

A companion series, Legion of X, launched in May 2022, written by Spurrier with art by Jan Bazaldua. The series followed Nightcrawler as he led a team of mutants, based out of the mindscape of Legion, who worked to mediate disputes and prevent mutants on Krakoa from self-destructing. Nightcrawler objected to the team being compared to a police force, a tension Spurrier said the series intended to explore by questioning how the team's methods differed from traditional law enforcement.

In April 2023, it was announced that Nightcrawler would star in a five-issue miniseries entitled Uncanny Spider-Man, written by Spurrier and illustrated by Lee Garbett as a part of the Fall of X, in which he would become the latest Spider-Man (Spinnenmann). Spurrier, who had previously written Nightcrawler in Way of X and Legion of X, said the new series gave him the chance to write "pure, joyous, street-level heroing" for the character after several years of stories centered on mutant politics and religion. He also said the book was designed to be approachable for readers unfamiliar with those earlier series, rather than requiring prior knowledge of Krakoa-era continuity.

In July 2023, Marvel announced a companion one-shot, X-Men Blue: Origins, written by Spurrier with art by Wilton Santos and a cover by Francis Manapul, billed as providing a definitive account of Nightcrawler's birth and his relationship with Mystique. Spurrier described the project as a chance to revisit the character's established origin from a different perspective, questioning which parts of his history could be considered reliable. The one-shot was released in November 2023.

During the X-Men: From the Ashes relaunch, Nightcrawler joined the Louisiana based X-Men appearing in Uncanny X-Men (Vol. 6) beginning in 2024.

== Characterization ==
=== Fictional character biography ===
Mystique, posing as an ordinary human, married a German baron named Eric Wagner before giving birth to Kurt in Bavaria. When the local population saw the newborn's demonic appearance, they pursued Mystique and the infant with a mob. She threw Kurt down a waterfall to escape, and Azazel, a mutant who resembled a demon and whose relationship to Mystique was later revealed as Kurt's biological father under the comic's pre-2023 continuity, retrieved the baby. Margali Szardos, a sorceress working as a circus fortuneteller, found Kurt less than an hour after his birth in a roadside shelter in the Bavarian Alps, his father Eric Wagner dead of a heart attack on the road outside. Margali brought him to the Bavarian circus where she worked, and while he was never legally adopted, the circus members collectively raised him without prejudice toward his appearance. His two closest childhood companions were Margali's children Stefan and Jimaine. By adolescence he had become the circus's star acrobat and aerial artist, his teleportation having not yet manifested; audiences assumed his appearance was a costume rather than a mutation. He left after a Texas millionaire named Amos Jardine purchased the circus and demanded he be placed in a freak show rather than a performance act. Making his way to Winzeldorf to find Stefan, he discovered that Stefan had killed several children; in the course of fighting to stop him, Kurt unintentionally broke his neck. Villagers discovered him with Stefan's body and, believing him responsible for the killings, were about to kill him when Professor Charles Xavier arrived and paralyzed them telepathically before recruiting Kurt into the X-Men.

It was later retconned that Nightcrawler's parents are Mystique and Destiny, rather than Mystique and Azazel as had been suggested in 2003. Mystique used her shapeshifting ability to conceive a child with Destiny, and the two kept this secret because they believed only their son could stop Azazel; Mystique feigned a pregnancy and allowed Azazel to believe the child was his. When a mob pursued her after the villagers saw the newborn's demonic appearance, Mystique left Kurt in the woods while she went to help Destiny, only to return and find him gone. Azazel had retrieved the infant and placed him with Margali Szardos.

Excalibur formed in the aftermath of the X-Men's apparent deaths at the hands of the Adversary, with the team based at Captain Britain's lighthouse on the coast of the United Kingdom. The base sat at the nexus of several alternate realities, a detail that defined much of the team's activity, as many of their missions took them across parallel worlds rather than staying within the main Marvel continuity. Among these encounters was a confrontation with the Lightning Force, a Nazi counterpart team from the alternate reality designated Earth-597. Nightcrawler developed feelings for Meggan, the lover of Captain Britain, and this attraction eventually escalated into a physical confrontation between the two men. After Captain Britain and Meggan married, the original Excalibur lineup disbanded and Nightcrawler returned to the X-Men.

Nightcrawler on the cover of X-Men vol. 2 #80, drawn by Carlos Pacheco

After Excalibur disbanded, Kurt returned to the X-Men. He subsequently encountered two half-brothers, Nils Styger and Kiwi Black, and the three together defeated Azazel. He was killed during a confrontation with Bastion while rescuing the mutant messiah Hope Summers, but later returned to life and rejoined the X-Men, taking a teaching position at the Jean Grey School for Higher Learning. After his resurrection he rekindled his romance with Amanda Sefton, but later lost her in the course of protecting the world from a returning Azazel. He remained with the X-Men under Kitty Pryde's leadership and eventually developed feelings for his longtime teammate Rachel Summers, with the two becoming a couple.

Nightcrawler was integral to the creation of Krakoan society, contributing a spiritual dimension to the mutant nation, and assisted in rescuing Legion from the anti-mutant organization Orchis. His physical appearance changed during this period as he began growing horns, due to the influence of his adoptive mother Margali Szardos, who had come under Orchis's control and was working to extract a weapon called the Hopesword from Nightcrawler's will. Under Orchis's control, he publicly assassinated three anti-Krakoan heads of state. Mother Righteous subsequently helped free him from both Orchis's control and Margali's influence, after which he was resurrected without their corruption. Recognizing the damage the murders had done to Krakoa's standing, Nightcrawler enters a self-imposed exile. Following the broader Krakoan massacre, he assumes the identity of the Uncanny Spider-Man, taking the Hopesword with him.

=== Powers and abilities ===
Nightcrawler teleports by displacing himself into an alternate dimension, traveling through it, and reappearing at a consciously chosen destination. The process occurs rapidly enough that he is unaware of passing through the other dimension, guided by an unconscious directional sense. The ability is biochemical and biophysical rather than psionic in nature. Each teleportation releases a small portion of the other dimension's atmosphere, producing the characteristic smell of brimstone and a "Bamf!" sound as air rushes in to fill the space he vacated.

Under optimal conditions, Nightcrawler can teleport approximately two miles east-to-west and up to three miles north-to-south, the difference reflecting the relative ease of traveling along Earth's magnetic lines of force rather than against them. Vertical teleportation upward is described as both difficult and dangerous. A limited unconscious extrasensory ability prevents him from materializing inside solid objects in his immediate vicinity, but because this ability is limited he will only teleport to locations he can see or has previously seen; materializing substantially inside a solid object would likely be fatal. His powers automatically displace liquids and gases upon arrival, and his momentum is preserved through the process, meaning he arrives carrying whatever velocity he had when he departed. When transporting passengers, even over moderate distances, both Nightcrawler and anyone he carries feel weakened and exhausted; over greater distances the strain could prove fatal. Through practice he increased both the mass he could carry and the distance over which he could carry it.

Nightcrawler is a skilled athlete and Olympic-class acrobat capable of a standing high jump of approximately eight feet. He is also a skilled hand-to-hand combatant, and a master fencer able to fence with his tail as well as his hands.

=== Appearance ===
Each of Nightcrawler's hands has three fingers including an opposable thumb, and each foot has two toes, longer than a normal human's. His prehensile tail measures approximately three and a half feet and is strong enough to support his full body weight. His body is covered in fine indigo-colored fur that causes him to blend into deep shadow. He has pointed ears, pronounced fang-like canine teeth, and a spine more flexible than a normal human's, allowing him to maintain a semi-crouching posture for extended periods without physical damage and to perform contortionist-level feats.

=== Personality and motivations ===
Among his more ironic character traits, Kurt Wagner is an extremely religious man. A devout Catholic, his demonic appearance makes it very difficult to be welcomed at Mass. Despite this, as mutants in the Marvel Universe become more accepted, he even managed to almost become a Catholic priest, but his studies were interrupted by a villainous group known as the Neo.

In contrast, Nightcrawler also has a knack for the spontaneous and exciting. He sees himself as a swashbuckler, usually comparing himself to Errol Flynn. He is, despite his looks, always charming and gallant, and several storylines contain Kurt's love life as a conflict to his religious nature. His days in the circus make him a gifted performer and showman. Kurt is also a jokester. He has a great sense of humor for someone in his situation and is known to play pranks on people.

Originally, Nightcrawler used a holographic device called an image-inducer to pose as a human. After an incident where he lost a bet with Wolverine and was forced to walk through town without it, he was emboldened and has since largely forsaken the use of the device, using it only when necessary.

During the 2023–2024 Uncanny Spider-Man storyline, in which Nightcrawler adopted a spider-themed costume and mask to operate in secret, writer Si Spurrier described the character's renewed enthusiasm for street-level heroics as a kind of self-imposed "self-spun therapy," allowing him to displace the guilt and grief he carried from the Fall of X without directly confronting it. Spurrier also used the series to question how much of Kurt's identity was tied to being a mutant, framing his arc as a struggle to reconcile personal responsibility with group identity rather than letting either one define him entirely.

== Supporting characters ==
=== Family ===
X-Men writer Chris Claremont had intended to reveal that Nightcrawler was the son of Nightmare early in his run. Roger Stern recounted, "It happened when I was the writer of Dr. Strange, back when writers were still occasionally listened to. Chris had come up with the latest of several crazy ideas and declared that Nightcrawler's father was Nightmare. And I replied with something like, 'No, he's not. I'm not going to let you appropriate one of my character's major villains.' As I recall, Len Wein crossed the room and shook my hand. And not too long after, I [became] the X-Men editor and was able to make sure that didn't happen for long enough that Chris eventually changed his mind." Claremont's new plan was for the mutant terrorist Mystique and her lover Destiny to have been Nightcrawler's biological parents. Mystique, being a shapeshifter, would have taken the form of a man and impregnated Destiny. However, Marvel felt the idea to be too controversial and an alternative origin was developed.

After hinting for many years that Mystique was indeed Nightcrawler's biological mother, it was confirmed by writer Scott Lobdell in X-Men Unlimited #4. In 2003, it was revealed that although Mystique was married to a wealthy German, Herr Wagner, Nightcrawler's father was Azazel, a member of a race of demonic-looking mutants known as the Neyaphem which date back to Biblical times that were banished to another dimension by a race of angelic mutants. The storyline was furthered by the revelation that fellow X-Man Archangel's healing blood did not heal Nightcrawler, and in fact caused him great pain.

However this was actually a ruse perpetuated by Destiny to deceive Azazel's plans and he was never actually Nightcrawler's father. Instead, Mystique impregnated Destiny but changed her body to mimic the pregnancy's progression to fool the Bavarian nobleman, Baron Christian Wagner. Destiny, pretending to be Mystique's maid, eventually gave birth to Nightcrawler before Mystique fled with him to the nearby woods to escape attacking villagers. Charles Xavier later erased the details of Nightcrawler's birth from both Destiny and Mystique's minds at Destiny's request.

Nightcrawler's siblings include his adoptive sister Rogue and half-brother Graydon Creed by Mystique. They previously included Abyss and Kiwi Black from Azazel; however, it was revealed that Azazel never actually fathered a child with Mystique. He is also a distant cousin to Blindfold and Trevor Chase, the grandchildren of Destiny.

It is also revealed that in a parallel universe, an alternate Nightcrawler fathered a daughter with an alternate Scarlet Witch; this girl, named Nocturne, is a dimensionally-stranded mutant bearing traits similar to Nightcrawler himself. Nocturne has since referred to Nightcrawler as her father. The demeanor of Nightcrawler is very similar to that of the Nightcrawler from Nocturne's reality, so the two developed a close bond that resembles a father-daughter relationship.

=== Allies ===
One of Nightcrawler's closest friendships within the X-Men is with Wolverine, who nicknamed him "elf" and, unlike most of the team, came to see him as someone who related to him as more than an animal. The two became regular sparring partners after the X-Men's founding, and their bond deepened after Wolverine encouraged Nightcrawler to walk through a town without his image inducer disguising his demonic appearance, then defended him when a crowd reacted with hostility. During a 2019 mission to destroy an orbital Sentinel-manufacturing station, Nightcrawler teleported himself and Wolverine outside the station in its final moments; he was killed instantly, while Wolverine used his remaining strength to send the station into the sun before also dying. Both were later resurrected together on Krakoa. Following the destruction of Krakoa, Wolverine withdrew into isolation, prompting Nightcrawler to again try to draw him back to the X-Men.

=== Romantic interests ===
Nightcrawler's longest-running romantic relationship has been with his foster sister, the sorceress Amanda Sefton, whom he began dating after she followed him to the United States; the two maintained an on-and-off relationship for decades, including during their time together in Excalibur, before drifting apart as Sefton took on responsibilities ruling the dimension of Limbo. During the same period with Excalibur, he had a relationship with Cerise, a deserter from the Shi'ar military, which ended when the Shi'ar Empire recaptured her, and developed a mutual but unconsummated attraction to his teammate Meggan while she was involved with, and later married to, Captain Britain. He has maintained a long platonic friendship with Storm marked by occasional flirtation and physical affection, including an instance in which she revived him after his death.

After Excalibur disbanded, Nightcrawler had a brief relationship with Christine Palmer, whom he met while investigating a series of deaths at a New York hospital, and later dated his X-Men teammate Rachel Summers, now known as Askani, with whom he considered proposing marriage before the relationship ended. He also became involved with Bloody Bess, a telepathic member of the mercenary group the Crimson Pirates, after the two worked together against the Shadow King. During the Fall of X storyline, in which he operated under the alias Uncanny Spider-Man, Nightcrawler began a relationship with the mercenary Silver Sable after rescuing her from the Rhino.

=== Alternate versions ===
In the Age of Apocalypse miniseries, Nightcrawler is similar to his Earth-616 counterpart, but much darker and more violent, and he carries two sabers at all times, denoting his skills as a swordsman. Nightcrawler is close to his mother, Mystique, and uses her surname of Darkholme.

After the events of the Dark Angel Saga, AoA Nightcrawler chooses to remain in the 616 reality and join X-Force. Searching for Sugar Man, Dark Beast, Iceman, and Blob, Kurt promises to "kill the bastards who ruined our lives". He is openly hostile concerning being mistaken with his alternative self.

In March 2013, X-Treme X-Men, Age of Apocalypse, and Astonishing X-Men crossed over in the "X-Termination" storyline, which focuses on the AoA Nightcrawler's attempt to get to his home universe. The AoA reality is seemingly destroyed with Nightcrawler in it.

Nightcrawler was also reimagined as part of Peach Momoko's Demon Days, an anthology series recasting Marvel characters within a Japanese folklore-inspired setting, with an issue centered on the character announced in 2021.

== Reception ==
Nightcrawler has received positive reception as a comic book character and as a member of the X-Men. Nightcrawler was ranked as the 133rd-greatest comic book character of all time by Wizard magazine. IGN also ranked Nightcrawler as the 80th-greatest comic book hero of all time describing Nightcrawler as a mutant with the appearance of a demon and the heart of a preacher; IGN also states that as the X-Men enter one of their most uncertain periods, his legacy still looms large. In 2006, IGN has also rated Nightcrawler at #7 on their list of top 25 X-Men from the past 40 years, stating that religion is one of the few commonalities that could bring mutants and humans together, and it is through his faith that Nightcrawler has stayed true to the X-Men for so long. In 2008, Marvel rated their top ten X-Men of all time. Nightcrawler ranked #4 on their list stating that far from a character consumed by doom and gloom, Nightcrawler's chivalry, a flair for the dramatic and sense of humor have made him one of the most likable X-Men ever, a character you genuinely look forward to seeing leap into action. In 2013, ComicsAlliance ranked Nightcrawler as #19 on their list of the "50 Sexiest Male Characters in Comics".

In 2014, Entertainment Weekly ranked Nightcrawler 5th in their "Let's rank every X-Man ever" list.

In 2018, Comic Book Resources ranked Nightcrawler 28th in their "Age Of Apocalypse: The 30 Strongest Characters In Marvel's Coolest Alternate World" list.

== In other media ==
=== Television ===
- Nightcrawler appears in the Spider-Man and His Amazing Friends episode "The X-Men Adventure", voiced by G. Stanley Jones.
- Nightcrawler appears in X-Men: Pryde of the X-Men, voiced by Neil Ross.
- Nightcrawler appears in X-Men: The Animated Series, voiced by Adrian Hough. This version is a monk at a Swiss abbey.
  - Nightcrawler appears in X-Men '97, voiced again by Adrian Hough. He joins the X-Men as a full member during the first season. In the second season, he sacrifices his life to the Celestial Eson in exchange for Rogue's life.
- A teenage Nightcrawler appears in X-Men: Evolution, voiced by Brad Swaile. This version is a student at the Xavier Institute who is insecure about his appearance and goes on to develop a relationship with Amanda Sefton.
- Nightcrawler appears in Wolverine and the X-Men, voiced by Liam O'Brien. This version is initially a member of the X-Men before they disband after Professor X and Jean Grey disappear under mysterious circumstances a year prior. In the present, Nightcrawler becomes a protector to mutant refugees traveling to Genosha, enters a romantic relationship with the Scarlet Witch, and eventually rejoins the X-Men.
- Nightcrawler makes a cameo appearance in the Black Panther episode "Black Panther vs. Juggernaut and Black Knight", voiced by Nolan North.

=== Film ===
Alan Cumming as Nightcrawler in X2

- Nightcrawler appears in an early script for X-Men (2000), written by Michael Chabon, before the script was scrapped.
- Nightcrawler appears in X2, portrayed by Alan Cumming. This version's body is covered in tattoos that represent his sins. He is brainwashed by Colonel William Stryker into mounting a failed assassination attempt on the President of the United States before Storm and Jean Grey locate and free him of his brainwashing. Nightcrawler later assists the X-Men in infiltrating Stryker's base.
- According to director Bryan Singer, Nightcrawler was intended to appear in X-Men: Days of Future Past, but was ultimately cut, as he felt "that we were forcing too many mutants into the story."
- A young Nightcrawler appears in X-Men: Apocalypse, portrayed by Kodi Smit-McPhee. Initially forced to compete in mutant cage fights against Angel, he is rescued by Mystique, assists the X-Men in defeating Apocalypse, and is recruited into their ranks.
- Nightcrawler makes a cameo appearance in Deadpool 2, portrayed again by Kodi Smit-McPhee.
- Nightcrawler appears in Dark Phoenix, portrayed again by Kodi Smit-McPhee.
- Nightcrawler is set to appear in Avengers: Doomsday, portrayed again by Alan Cumming.

=== Video games ===
- Nightcrawler appears in The Uncanny X-Men.
- Nightcrawler appears in X-Men: Madness in Murderworld.
- Nightcrawler appears in X-Men (1992).
- Nightcrawler appears in X-Men (1993).
- Nightcrawler appears in X-Men 2: Clone Wars.
- Nightcrawler appears in X-Men: Mutant Academy 2.
- Nightcrawler appears in X-Men: Next Dimension.
- Nightcrawler appears as a playable character in X-Men: The Official Game, voiced by Alan Cumming. After helping the X-Men defeat Master Mold, he takes a sabbatical to return to Germany, feeling that he is fundamentally a man of peace.
- Nightcrawler appears as a playable character in X-Men Legends, voiced by Dee Bradley Baker.
- Nightcrawler appears as a playable character in X-Men Legends II: Rise of Apocalypse, voiced again by Dee Bradley Baker.
- Nightcrawler appears as a non-player character (NPC), later a downloadable playable character for the Xbox 360, in Marvel: Ultimate Alliance, voiced again by Dee Bradley Baker.
- Nightcrawler appears as an assist character in the PlayStation 2, Nintendo DS, and PSP versions of Spider-Man: Web of Shadows, voiced by Yuri Lowenthal.
- Nightcrawler appears as a playable character in Marvel Super Hero Squad, voiced again by Liam O'Brien.
- Nightcrawler makes cameo appearances in Trish and Magneto's endings in Marvel vs. Capcom 3: Fate of Two Worlds.
- Nightcrawler appears in X-Men: Destiny, voiced again by Yuri Lowenthal.
- Nightcrawler appears as a support card in Ultimate Marvel vs. Capcom 3's "Heroes and Heralds" mode.
- Nightcrawler appears as a playable character in Marvel Super Hero Squad Online.
- Nightcrawler appears as a playable character in Marvel Avengers Alliance.
- Nightcrawler appears as a playable character in Marvel Heroes, voiced again by Liam O'Brien.
- Nightcrawler appears as a playable character in Marvel Contest of Champions.
- Nightcrawler appears as a playable character in Marvel Puzzle Quest.
- Nightcrawler appears as a playable character in Marvel Ultimate Alliance 3: The Black Order, voiced again by Liam O'Brien.
- Nightcrawler appears as a playable character in Marvel Rivals, voiced by Matthew Mercer.

=== Miscellaneous ===
- Nightcrawler appears in Planet X. This version's powers are theorized by Geordi La Forge to utilize the same subspace as the Enterprise's warp drive. Additionally, Nightcrawler is capable of teleporting onto enemy ships and bypassing their shields, which the Enterprise's transporters cannot do.
- The X-Men film incarnation of Nightcrawler appears in the X-2: X-Men United prequel comic, which reveals him to have been a circus performer and lover of fellow performer Amanda Sefton.
- Nightcrawler is referenced in the Weezer song "In the Garage".
- Nightcrawler appears in the Wolverine: Weapon X motion comic, voiced by Trevor Devall.
